= List of Pretty Little Liars episodes =

Pretty Little Liars is a television series which premiered on ABC Family on June 8, 2010. Developed by I. Marlene King, the series is based on the Pretty Little Liars book series by Sara Shepard. The series follows the lives of four high school girls, Aria Montgomery, Hanna Marin, Emily Fields, and Spencer Hastings, whose clique falls apart after the disappearance of their leader, Alison DiLaurentis. One year later, the estranged friends are reunited as they begin receiving messages from a mysterious figure named "A" who threatens to expose their deepest secrets, including ones they thought only Alison knew.

After an initial order of 10 episodes, ABC Family ordered an additional 12 episodes for season one on June 28, 2010. The first season's "summer finale" aired on August 10, 2010, with the remaining 12 episodes began airing on January 3, 2011. On January 11, 2011, ABC Family picked up Pretty Little Liars for a second season of 24 episodes. It began airing on Tuesday, June 14, 2011. It was announced in June that a special Halloween-themed episode would air as part of ABC Family's 13 Nights of Halloween line-up. This increased the episode count from 24 to 25. On November 29, 2011, ABC Family renewed the series for a third season, consisting of 24 episodes. On October 4, 2012, ABC Family renewed the series for a fourth season, consisting of 24 episodes. On March 26, 2013, ABC Family renewed the series for a fifth season. On January 7, 2014, showrunner I. Marlene King wrote on Twitter that season 5 will have 25 episodes, including a holiday-themed episode. On June 10, 2014, it was announced that the show was renewed for an additional 2 seasons. It was announced by I. Marlene King that the sixth and the seventh season will consist of 20 episodes each. It was announced on August 29, 2016, that the show would be ending after the seventh season, and that the second half of the season would begin airing April 18, 2017.

During the course of the series, 160 episodes of Pretty Little Liars aired over seven seasons, between June 8, 2010, and June 27, 2017.

== Series overview ==
Season	Episodes	Originally released		Viewers (in millions)	Adults (18-49)
Season	Episodes	First released	Last released	Viewers (in millions)	Adults (18-49)
1	22	June 8, 2010	March 21, 2011	2.87	1.0
2	25	June 14, 2011	March 19, 2012	2.68	1.0
3	24	June 5, 2012	March 19, 2013	2.59	1.1
4	24	June 11, 2013	March 18, 2014	2.53	1.1
5	25	June 10, 2014	March 24, 2015	2.01	0.9
6	20	June 2, 2015	March 15, 2016	1.72	0.8
7	20	June 21, 2016	June 27, 2017	1.10	0.6

== Episodes ==
=== Season 1 (2010–11) ===
No. overall	No. in season	Title	Directed by	Written by	Original release date	U.S. viewers (millions)
1	1	"Pilot"	Lesli Linka Glatter	I. Marlene King	June 8, 2010	2.47
2	2	"The Jenna Thing"	Liz Friedlander	I. Marlene King	June 15, 2010	2.48
3	3	"To Kill a Mocking Girl"	Elodie Keene	Oliver Goldstick	June 22, 2010	2.74
4	4	"Can You Hear Me Now?"	Norman Buckley	Joseph Dougherty	June 29, 2010	2.09
5	5	"Reality Bites Me"	Wendey Stanzler	Bryan M. Holdman	July 6, 2010	2.62
6	6	"There's No Place Like Homecoming"	Norman Buckley	Maya Goldsmith	July 13, 2010	2.69
7	7	"The Homecoming Hangover"	Chris Grismer	Tamar Laddy	July 20, 2010	2.55
8	8	"Please, Do Talk About Me When I'm Gone"	Arlene Sanford	Joseph Dougherty	July 27, 2010	2.52
9	9	"The Perfect Storm"	Jamie Babbit	Oliver Goldstick	August 3, 2010	2.55
10	10	"Keep Your Friends Close"	Ron Lagomarsino	I. Marlene King	August 10, 2010	3.07
11	11	"Moments Later"	Norman Buckley	Joseph Dougherty	January 3, 2011	4.20
12	12	"Salt Meets Wound"	Norman Buckley	Oliver Goldstick	January 10, 2011	3.21
13	13	"Know Your Frenemies"	Ron Lagomarsino	I. Marlene King	January 17, 2011	2.99
14	14	"Careful What U Wish 4"	Norman Buckley	Tamar Laddy	January 24, 2011	3.17
15	15	"If at First You Don't Succeed, Lie, Lie Again"	Ron Lagomarsino	Maya Goldsmith	January 31, 2011	3.19
16	16	"Je Suis Une Amie"	Chris Grismer	Bryan M. Holdman	February 7, 2011	3.14
17	17	"The New Normal"	Michael Grossman	Joseph Dougherty	February 14, 2011	2.35
18	18	"The Badass Seed"	Paul Lazarus	Oliver Goldstick & Francesca Rollins	February 21, 2011	2.90
19	19	"A Person of Interest"	Ron Lagomarsino	I. Marlene King & Jonell Lennon	February 28, 2011	2.69
20	20	"Someone to Watch Over Me"	Arlene Sanford	Joseph Dougherty	March 7, 2011	2.95
21	21	"Monsters in the End"	Chris Grismer	Oliver Goldstick	March 14, 2011	2.94
22	22	"For Whom the Bell Tolls"	Lesli Linka Glatter	I. Marlene King	March 21, 2011	3.64

=== Season 2 (2011–12) ===
No. overall	No. in season	Title	Directed by	Written by	Original release date	U.S. viewers (millions)
23	1	"It's Alive"	Ron Lagomarsino	I. Marlene King	June 14, 2011	3.68
24	2	"The Goodbye Look"	Norman Buckley	Joseph Dougherty	June 21, 2011	2.66
25	3	"My Name Is Trouble"	Elodie Keene	Oliver Goldstick	June 28, 2011	2.78
26	4	"Blind Dates"	Dean White	Charlie Craig	July 5, 2011	2.42
27	5	"The Devil You Know"	Michael Grossman	Maya Goldsmith	July 12, 2011	2.42
28	6	"Never Letting Go"	J. Miller Tobin	Bryan M. Holdman	July 19, 2011	2.53
29	7	"Surface Tension"	Norman Buckley	Joseph Dougherty	July 26, 2011	2.36
30	8	"Save the Date"	Chris Grismer	Matt Witten	August 2, 2011	2.41
31	9	"Picture This"	Patrick Norris	Jonell Lennon	August 9, 2011	2.54
32	10	"Touched by an A-ngel"	Chad Lowe	Charlie Craig & Maya Goldsmith	August 16, 2011	2.30
33	11	"I Must Confess"	Norman Buckley	Oliver Goldstick	August 23, 2011	2.63
34	12	"Over My Dead Body"	Ron Lagomarsino	I. Marlene King	August 30, 2011	2.98
35	13	"The First Secret"	Dana W. Gonzales	I. Marlene King	October 19, 2011	2.47
36	14	"Through Many Dangers, Toils and Snares"	Norman Buckley	Joseph Dougherty	January 2, 2012	3.34
37	15	"A Hot Piece of 'A'"	Michael Grossman	Oliver Goldstick	January 9, 2012	2.95
38	16	"Let the Water Hold Me Down"	Chris Grismer	Bryan M. Holdman	January 16, 2012	2.78
39	17	"The Blond Leading the Blind"	Arlene Sanford	Charlie Craig	January 23, 2012	3.17
40	18	"A Kiss Before Lying"	Wendey Stanzler	Maya Goldsmith	January 30, 2012	2.55
41	19	"The Naked Truth"	Elodie Keene	Oliver Goldstick & Francesca Rollins	February 6, 2012	2.25
42	20	"CTRL:A"	Ron Lagomarsino	Joseph Dougherty & Lijah J. Barasz	February 13, 2012	2.11
43	21	"Breaking the Code"	Roger Kumble	Jonell Lennon	February 20, 2012	2.54
44	22	"Father Knows Best"	Chad Lowe	Charlie Craig & Bryan M. Holdman	February 27, 2012	2.49
45	23	"Eye of the Beholder"	Melanie Mayron	Joseph Dougherty	March 5, 2012	2.58
46	24	"If These Dolls Could Talk"	Ron Lagomarsino	Oliver Goldstick & Maya Goldsmith	March 12, 2012	2.47
47	25	"UnmAsked"	Lesli Linka Glatter	I. Marlene King	March 19, 2012	3.69

=== Season 3 (2012–13) ===
No. overall	No. in season	Title	Directed by	Written by	Original release date	U.S. viewers (millions)
48	1	"It Happened 'That Night'"	Ron Lagomarsino	I. Marlene King	June 5, 2012	2.93
49	2	"Blood Is the New Black"	Norman Buckley	Oliver Goldstick	June 12, 2012	2.66
50	3	"Kingdom of the Blind"	Chad Lowe	Joseph Dougherty	June 19, 2012	2.44
51	4	"Birds of a Feather"	Roger Kumble	Story by : Michael J. Cinquemani; Teleplay by : Jonell Lennon	June 26, 2012	2.36
52	5	"That Girl Is Poison"	Chad Lowe	Bryan M. Holdman	July 10, 2012	2.38
53	6	"The Remains of the 'A'"	Norman Buckley	Maya Goldsmith	July 17, 2012	2.27
54	7	"Crazy"	Patrick Norris	Andy Reaser	July 24, 2012	2.43
55	8	"Stolen Kisses"	Zetna Fuentes	Joseph Dougherty	July 31, 2012	2.22
56	9	"The Kahn Game"	Wendey Stanzler	Lijah J. Barasz	August 7, 2012	2.45
57	10	"What Lies Beneath"	Patrick Norris	Jonell Lennon	August 14, 2012	2.27
58	11	"Single Fright Female"	Joanna Kerns	Oliver Goldstick & Maya Goldsmith	August 21, 2012	2.39
59	12	"The Lady Killer"	Ron Lagomarsino	I. Marlene King	August 28, 2012	2.98
60	13	"This Is a Dark Ride"	Tim Hunter	Joseph Dougherty	October 23, 2012	2.85
61	14	"She's Better Now"	Wendey Stanzler	Oliver Goldstick	January 8, 2013	3.21
62	15	"Mona-Mania"	Norman Buckley	Bryan M. Holdman	January 15, 2013	2.48
63	16	"Misery Loves Company"	I. Marlene King	I. Marlene King & Jonell Lennon	January 22, 2013	2.68
64	17	"Out of the Frying Pan, Into the Inferno"	Michael Grossman	Maya Goldsmith	January 29, 2013	2.86
65	18	"Dead to Me"	Arlene Sanford	Joseph Dougherty & Lijah J. Barasz	February 5, 2013	2.75
66	19	"What Becomes of the Broken-Hearted"	Ron Lagomarsino	Oliver Goldstick & Francesca Rollins	February 12, 2013	2.41
67	20	"Hot Water"	Chad Lowe	Andy Reaser	February 19, 2013	2.61
68	21	"Out of Sight, Out of Mind"	Melanie Mayron	Jonell Lennon	February 26, 2013	2.71
69	22	"Will the Circle Be Unbroken?"	Ron Lagomarsino	Joseph Dougherty	March 5, 2013	2.56
70	23	"I'm Your Puppet"	Oliver Goldstick	Oliver Goldstick & Maya Goldsmith	March 12, 2013	2.41
71	24	"A DAngerous GAme"	Patrick Norris	I. Marlene King	March 19, 2013	2.87

=== Season 4 (2013–14) ===
No. overall	No. in season	Title	Directed by	Written by	Original release date	U.S. viewers (millions)
72	1	"'A' Is for A-l-i-v-e"	I. Marlene King	I. Marlene King	June 11, 2013	2.97
73	2	"Turn of the Shoe"	Joanna Kerns	Oliver Goldstick	June 18, 2013	2.92
74	3	"Cat's Cradle"	Norman Buckley	Joseph Dougherty	June 25, 2013	2.25
75	4	"Face Time"	Norman Buckley	Joseph Dougherty	July 2, 2013	2.16
76	5	"Gamma Zeta Die!"	Mick Garris	Maya Goldsmith	July 9, 2013	2.30
77	6	"Under the Gun"	Wendey Stanzler	Lijah J. Barasz	July 16, 2013	2.35
78	7	"Crash and Burn, Girl!"	Ron Lagomarsino	Bryan M. Holdman	July 23, 2013	2.86
79	8	"The Guilty Girl's Handbook"	Janice Cooke	Jan Oxenberg	July 30, 2013	2.31
80	9	"Into the Deep"	Chad Lowe	Jonell Lennon	August 6, 2013	2.65
81	10	"The Mirror Has Three Faces"	Zetna Fuentes	Maya Goldsmith	August 13, 2013	2.39
82	11	"Bring Down the Hoe"	Melanie Mayron	Oliver Goldstick & Francesca Rollins	August 20, 2013	2.26
83	12	"Now You See Me, Now You Don't"	Norman Buckley	I. Marlene King & Bryan M. Holdman	August 27, 2013	3.33
84	13	"Grave New World"	Ron Lagomarsino	Joseph Dougherty & Oliver Goldstick & I. Marlene King	October 22, 2013	3.18
85	14	"Who's in the Box?"	Chad Lowe	Joseph Dougherty	January 7, 2014	3.17
86	15	"Love ShAck, Baby"	Norman Buckley	Lijah J. Barasz	January 14, 2014	2.39
87	16	"Close Encounters"	Arthur Anderson	Jonell Lennon	January 21, 2014	2.63
88	17	"Bite Your Tongue"	Arlene Sanford	Oliver Goldstick & Maya Goldsmith	January 28, 2014	2.49
89	18	"Hot for Teacher"	Tripp Reed	Bryan M. Holdman	February 4, 2014	2.16
90	19	"Shadow Play"	Joseph Dougherty	Joseph Dougherty	February 11, 2014	2.16
91	20	"Free Fall"	Melanie Mayron	Maya Goldsmith	February 18, 2014	2.56
92	21	"She's Come Undone"	Chad Lowe	Jonell Lennon	February 25, 2014	2.17
93	22	"Cover for Me"	Michael Grossman	Bryan M. Holdman	March 4, 2014	2.06
94	23	"Unbridled"	Oliver Goldstick	Oliver Goldstick & Maya Goldsmith	March 11, 2014	1.95
95	24	"'A' Is for Answers"	I. Marlene King	I. Marlene King	March 18, 2014	3.12

=== Season 5 (2014–15) ===
No. overall	No. in season	Title	Directed by	Written by	Original release date	U.S. viewers (millions)
96	1	"EscApe from New York"	Norman Buckley	I. Marlene King	June 10, 2014	2.72
97	2	"Whirly Girlie"	Joanna Kerns	Oliver Goldstick	June 17, 2014	2.16
98	3	"Surfing the Aftershocks"	Chad Lowe	Joseph Dougherty	June 24, 2014	2.28
99	4	"Thrown from the Ride"	Janice Cooke	Maya Goldsmith	July 1, 2014	2.13
100	5	"Miss Me x 100"	Norman Buckley	I. Marlene King	July 8, 2014	2.25
101	6	"Run, Ali, Run"	Norman Buckley	Jonell Lennon	July 15, 2014	2.13
102	7	"The Silence of E. Lamb"	Joshua Butler	Bryan M. Holdman	July 22, 2014	2.06
103	8	"Scream for Me"	Bethany Rooney	Oliver Goldstick & Maya Goldsmith	July 29, 2014	1.80
104	9	"March of Crimes"	Chad Lowe	Oliver Goldstick & Maya Goldsmith	August 5, 2014	2.05
105	10	"A Dark Ali"	Arlene Sanford	Lijah J. Barasz	August 12, 2014	2.05
106	11	"No One Here Can Love or Understand Me"	Larry Reibman	Joseph Dougherty	August 19, 2014	1.80
107	12	"Taking This One to the Grave"	Ron Lagomarsino	I. Marlene King	August 26, 2014	2.29
108	13	"How the 'A' Stole Christmas"	I. Marlene King	I. Marlene King & Kyle Bown	December 9, 2014	2.09
109	14	"Through a Glass, Darkly"	Chad Lowe	Joseph Dougherty & Lijah J. Barasz	January 6, 2015	2.01
110	15	"Fresh Meat"	Zetna Fuentes	Oliver Goldstick & Maya Goldsmith	January 13, 2015	2.02
111	16	"Over a Barrel"	Michael Grossman	Bryan M. Holdman	January 20, 2015	1.72
112	17	"The Bin of Sin"	Tripp Reed	Jonell Lennon	January 27, 2015	2.00
113	18	"Oh, What Hard Luck Stories They All Hand Me"	Joseph Dougherty	Joseph Dougherty	February 3, 2015	1.80
114	19	"Out, Damned Spot"	Nzingha Stewart	Lijah J. Barasz	February 10, 2015	1.77
115	20	"Pretty Isn't the Point"	Melanie Mayron	Oliver Goldstick & Francesca Rollins	February 17, 2015	2.05
116	21	"Bloody Hell"	Arlene Sanford	Maya Goldsmith	February 24, 2015	1.58
117	22	"To Plea or Not to Plea"	Arthur Anderson	Jonell Lennon	March 3, 2015	1.49
118	23	"The Melody Lingers On"	Roger Kumble	Joseph Dougherty	March 10, 2015	1.74
119	24	"I'm a Good Girl, I Am"	Oliver Goldstick	Oliver Goldstick & Maya Goldsmith	March 17, 2015	1.70
120	25	"Welcome to the Dollhouse"	Ron Lagomarsino	I. Marlene King	March 24, 2015	2.65

=== Season 6 (2015–16) ===
No. overall	No. in season	Title	Directed by	Written by	Original release date	U.S. viewers (millions)
121	1	"Game On, Charles"	Chad Lowe	Story by : I. Marlene King; Teleplay by : I. Marlene King & Lijah J. Barasz	June 2, 2015	2.38
122	2	"Songs of Innocence"	Norman Buckley	Joseph Dougherty	June 9, 2015	2.13
123	3	"Songs of Experience"	Norman Buckley	Joseph Dougherty	June 16, 2015	1.74
124	4	"Don't Look Now"	Arlene Sanford	Jonell Lennon	June 23, 2015	1.84
125	5	"She's No Angel"	Michael Grossman	Oliver Goldstick & Maya Goldsmith	June 30, 2015	1.80
126	6	"No Stone Unturned"	Chad Lowe	Oliver Goldstick & Maya Goldsmith	July 14, 2015	1.70
127	7	"O Brother, Where Art Thou"	Bethany Rooney	Lijah J. Barasz	July 21, 2015	1.77
128	8	"FrAmed"	Larry Reibman	Bryan M. Holdman	July 28, 2015	1.58
129	9	"Last Dance"	Janice Cooke	Oliver Goldstick & Francesca Rollins	August 4, 2015	2.03
130	10	"Game Over, Charles"	I. Marlene King	I. Marlene King	August 11, 2015	3.09
131	11	"Of Late I Think of Rosewood"	Ron Lagomarsino	Joseph Dougherty	January 12, 2016	2.25
132	12	"Charlotte's Web"	Joanna Kerns	Jonell Lennon & Lijah J. Barasz	January 19, 2016	1.66
133	13	"The Gloves Are On"	Kimberly McCullough	Oliver Goldstick & Maya Goldsmith	January 26, 2016	1.65
134	14	"New Guys, New Lies"	Zetna Fuentes	Kyle Bown & Kateland Brown	February 2, 2016	1.39
135	15	"Do Not Disturb"	Melanie Mayron	Bryan M. Holdman	February 9, 2016	1.22
136	16	"Where Somebody Waits for Me"	Joseph Dougherty	Joseph Dougherty	February 16, 2016	1.36
137	17	"We've All Got Baggage"	Paula Hunziker	Oliver Goldstick	February 23, 2016	1.27
138	18	"Burn This"	Arthur Anderson	Maya Goldsmith	March 1, 2016	1.15
139	19	"Did You Miss Me?"	Roger Kumble	Joseph Dougherty	March 8, 2016	1.26
140	20	"Hush, Hush, Sweet Liars"	Ron Lagomarsino	I. Marlene King	March 15, 2016	1.19

=== Season 7 (2016–17) ===
No. overall	No. in season	Title	Directed by	Written by	Original release date	Prod. code	U.S. viewers (millions)
141	1	"Tick-Tock, Bitches"	Ron Lagomarsino	I. Marlene King	June 21, 2016	2M7201	1.43
142	2	"Bedlam"	Tawnia McKiernan	Joseph Dougherty	June 28, 2016	2M7202	1.24
143	3	"The Talented Mr. Rollins"	Zetna Fuentes	Jonell Lennon	July 5, 2016	2M7203	1.12
144	4	"Hit and Run, Run, Run"	Michael Goi	Maya Goldsmith	July 12, 2016	2M7204	1.26
145	5	"Along Comes Mary"	Norman Buckley	Bryan M. Holdman	July 19, 2016	2M7205	1.17
146	6	"Wanted: Dead or Alive"	Bethany Rooney	Lijah J. Barasz	August 2, 2016	2M7206	1.10
147	7	"Original G'A'ngsters"	Melanie Mayron	Kateland Brown	August 9, 2016	2M7207	1.16
148	8	"Exes and OMGs"	Kimberly McCullough	Charlie Craig	August 16, 2016	2M7208	1.11
149	9	"The Wrath of Kahn"	Chad Lowe	Jonell Lennon	August 23, 2016	2M7209	1.09
150	10	"The DArkest Knight"	Arlene Sanford	I. Marlene King & Maya Goldsmith	August 30, 2016	2M7210	1.33
151	11	"Playtime"	Chad Lowe	Allyson N. Nelson & Joseph Dougherty	April 18, 2017	2M7211	1.33
152	12	"These Boots Were Made for Stalking"	Ron Lagomarsino	Oliver Goldstick	April 25, 2017	2M7212	0.92
153	13	"Hold Your Piece"	Marta Cunningham	Bryan M. Holdman	May 2, 2017	2M7213	0.86
154	14	"Power Play"	Roger Kumble	Lijah J. Barasz	May 9, 2017	2M7214	0.91
155	15	"In the Eye Abides the Heart"	Troian Bellisario	Joseph Dougherty	May 23, 2017	2M7215	0.85
156	16	"The Glove That Rocks the Cradle"	Paula Hunziker	Maya Goldsmith	May 30, 2017	2M7216	0.90
157	17	"Driving Miss Crazy"	Oliver Goldstick	Francesca Rollins & Oliver Goldstick	June 6, 2017	2M7217	0.97
158	18	"Choose or Lose"	Norman Buckley	Charlie Craig	June 13, 2017	2M7218	0.96
159	19	"Farewell, My Lovely"	Joseph Dougherty	Joseph Dougherty	June 20, 2017	2M7219	0.83
160	20	"Till Death Do Us Part"	I. Marlene King	Story by : I. Marlene King & Kyle Bown; Teleplay by : I. Marlene King & Maya Goldsmith	June 27, 2017	2M7220	1.41

== Specials ==
No. of special	Season aired in	Title	Featuring	Aired between/after	Original air date	U.S. viewers (million)
1	4	"A Liars Guide to Rosewood"	Janel Parrish as Mona Vanderwaal	"A Dangerous Game" "'A' Is for A-l-i-v-e"	June 4, 2013	1.13
2	5	"We Love You to DeAth"	I. Marlene King & The cast and crew of Pretty Little Liars	"Taking This One To the Grave" "How the 'A' Stole Christmas"	October 21, 2014	1.30
3	6	"5 Years Forward"	I. Marlene King & The cast and crew of Pretty Little Liars	"Game Over, Charles" "Of Late I Think of Rosewood"	November 24, 2015	0.77
4	7	"A-List Wrap Party"	The cast of Pretty Little Liars	"Till Death Do Us Part"	June 27, 2017	0.62

== Webisodes ==
=== Pretty Dirty Secrets ===
No. in series	No. in season	Title	Directed by	Written by	Original air date
1	1	"A ReservAtion"	Arthur Anderson	Kyle Bown & Kim Turrisi	August 28, 2012
2	2	"A Reunion"	Arthur Anderson	Kyle Bown & Kim Turrisi	September 4, 2012
3	3	"A VoicemAil"	Arthur Anderson	Kyle Bown & Kim Turrisi	September 11, 2012
4	4	"I'm A Free MAn"	Arthur Anderson	Kyle Bown & Kim Turrisi	September 18, 2012
5	5	"TrAde Off"	Arthur Anderson	Kyle Bown & Kim Turrisi	September 25, 2012
6	6	"AssociAtion"	Arthur Anderson	Kyle Bown & Kim Turrisi	October 2, 2012
7	7	"CAll Security"	Arthur Anderson	Kyle Bown & Kim Turrisi	October 9, 2012
8	8	"The 'A' TrAin"	Arthur Anderson	Kyle Bown & Kim Turrisi	October 16, 2012

== Ratings ==
=== Seasons 1–4 ===
Pretty Little Liars : U.S. viewers per episode (millions)

Season	Episode number																								
Season	1	2	3	4	5	6	7	8	9	10	11	12	13	14	15	16	17	18	19	20	21	22	23	24	25
1	2.47	2.48	2.74	2.09	2.62	2.69	2.55	2.52	2.55	3.07	4.20	3.21	2.99	3.17	3.19	3.14	2.35	2.90	2.69	2.95	2.94	3.64	–		
2	3.68	2.66	2.78	2.42	2.42	2.53	2.36	2.41	2.54	2.30	2.63	2.98	2.47	3.34	2.95	2.78	3.17	2.55	2.25	2.11	2.54	2.49	2.58	2.47	3.69
3	2.93	2.66	2.44	2.36	2.38	2.27	2.43	2.22	2.45	2.27	2.39	2.98	2.85	3.21	2.48	2.68	2.86	2.75	2.41	2.61	2.71	2.56	2.41	2.87	–
4	2.97	2.92	2.25	2.16	2.30	2.35	2.86	2.31	2.65	2.39	2.26	3.33	3.18	3.17	2.39	2.63	2.49	2.16	2.16	2.56	2.17	2.06	1.95	3.12	–

Audience measurement performed by Nielsen Media Research

=== Seasons 5–7 ===
Pretty Little Liars : U.S. viewers per episode (millions)

Season	Episode number																								
Season	1	2	3	4	5	6	7	8	9	10	11	12	13	14	15	16	17	18	19	20	21	22	23	24	25
5	2.72	2.16	2.28	2.13	2.25	2.13	2.06	1.80	2.05	2.05	1.80	2.29	2.09	2.01	2.02	1.72	2.00	1.80	1.77	2.05	1.58	1.49	1.74	1.70	2.65
6	2.38	2.13	1.74	1.84	1.80	1.70	1.77	1.58	2.03	3.09	2.25	1.66	1.65	1.39	1.22	1.36	1.27	1.15	1.26	1.19	–				
7	1.43	1.24	1.12	1.26	1.17	1.10	1.16	1.11	1.09	1.33	1.33	0.92	0.86	0.91	0.85	0.90	0.97	0.96	0.83	1.41	–				

Audience measurement performed by Nielsen Media Research
