= Exes and OMGs =

- Pretty Little Liars episode
- Episode no.: Season 7 Episode 8
- Directed by: Kimberly McCullough
- Written by: Charlie Craig
- Cinematography by: Larry Reibman
- Editing by: Jill D'Agnenica
- Original air date: August 16, 2016
- Running time: 42 minutes

Guest appearances
- Brant Daugherty as Noel Kahn; Lindsey Shaw as Paige McCullers; Lulu Brud as Sabrina; Meg Foster as Carla Grunwald; John O'Brien as Arthur Hackett; Keith Szarabajka as Dr. E. Cochran; Sprague Grayden as Dr. Cochran; Dalton Cyr as Luke

Episode chronology
← Previous "Original G'A'ngsters"	Next → "The Wrath of Kahn"
- Pretty Little Liars season 7

"Exes and OMGs" is the eighth episode of the seventh season of the mystery drama television series Pretty Little Liars, which aired on August 16, 2016, on the cable network Freeform. The hundred and forty-eighth episode, it was directed by Kimberly McCullough and written by Charlie Craig. "Exes and OMGs" received a Nielsen rating of 0.6 and was viewed by 1.11 million viewers, down from the previous episode. It received positive reviews from critics.

The series revolves around a group of five women—collectively known as Liars—, who receive anonymous messages in the form of threats from an unknown person named A.D., while they struggle to survive a life with danger. In this episode, the Liars go in search for answers about Mary Drake's second child, while Hanna decides to address the problem face-to-face.

== Plot ==
At night, the Liars and Caleb (Tyler Blackburn) are at Rosewood's main street, talking about the possibility of Noel Kahn being A.D., and Alison (Sasha Pieterse) reveals that Noel pushed a girl off the stairs in a party the Liars attended years ago. Hanna (Ashley Benson) insists that Noel is A.D., but the girls are indecisive, making Hanna angry. Caleb starts talking with Hanna about A.D., but a car interrupts them and ends up running over Caleb. Hanna sees Noel (Brant Daugherty) driving the car and screams. However, she wakes up and finds it was just a dream. A worried Hanna then goes to Caleb's and finds him hard at work trying to discover what is behind Mary Drake's files. Before Hanna leaves, he gives her a bug-free new phone.

Aria (Lucy Hale) struggles with the possibility of Nicole being alive, and her relationship with Ezra (Ian Harding) becomes strained when she reveals that she deleted Nicole's call from his phone. Alison decides to return to work as a teacher at Rosewood High, but her students end up playing a trick on her. Emily (Shay Mitchell) receives a job-offer from principal Hackett (John O'Brien) to work as a swim coach at the school, and finds out that Paige (Lindsey Shaw) has returned to Rosewood and is also a candidate for the job. Spencer and Aria get together to find Dr. Cochran, with whom Noel was talking to the day before, and discover that he was responsible for the birth of both Mary Drake's children when she was hospitalized in Radley.

Emily tries to convince Ezra that Aria deleted Nicole's call with only the best intentions. Hanna receives a strange visit from Mrs. Grunwald (Meg Foster), who says Hanna is in danger and increases Hanna's fear in relation to Noel. Paige reveals to Emily that she almost joined the Olympics, but a car accident ended up destroying that possibility. Aria buys a ticket for Ezra to get him closer to the latest news on Nicole, delaying their wedding. Hanna goes rogue and decides to work alone in an unknown plan to take down A.D. once and for all.

== Production ==
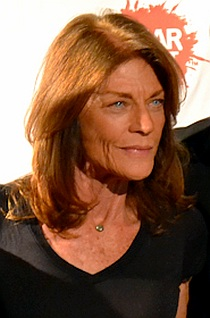
Meg Foster plays Carla Grunwald for the first and only time during the seventh season.

The episode was directed by Kimberly McCullough, her second credit as a director on the series, the first one being the thirteenth episode of the sixth season. The writing for the episode was handled by Charlie Craig, who served as writer on the second season, and returned as executive producer, co-showrunner and writer for the seventh season. This installment features the guest appearances of Brant Daugherty as Noel Kahn, Lindsey Shaw as Paige McCullers, Lulu Brud as Sabrina, Meg Foster as Carla Grunwald, John O'Brien as Arthur Hackett, Keith Szarabajka as Dr. E. Cochran, Sprague Grayden as Dr. Cochran, and Dalton Cyr as Luke.

== Reception ==
=== Broadcasting and ratings ===
"Exes and OMGs" was first aired in the U.S. on August 16, 2016 for a viewership of 1.11 million Americans, and garnered a 0.6 rating in the 18–49 demographic, according to Nielsen Media Research. Values from this episode had a decrease from the previous episode, "Original G'A'ngsters." This episode is rated TV-14. After Live +3 DVR ratings, the episode tied for the seventh spot in Adults 18-49, finishing with a 1.1 rating among adults aged 18–49, and aired to a total viewership of 1.97 million, placing in the fifteenth spot in viewership.

=== Reviews ===
Paul Dailly of the TVFanatic gave the episode 3.6 out of 5 stars, calling it as "crazy," and wrote: "The stage is set for a solid conclusion to this half of the season, but who won't make it out alive?" Writing for the website SpoilerTV, Gavin Hetherington called the episode as "average", stating: "I think I would have liked it more if they didn't beat around the bush and try too hard to avoid certain things. It slows down the plot, and to me, this episode didn't move to the pace I wanted it too. At least give us something more." In contrast, Jessica Goldstein of Vulture wrote a mixed review for the episode, saying: "It's possible that I've said this before, but I think we have really, truly crossed over to a realm where Pretty Little Liars has no plot at all. Not like 'the plot doesn't make any sense,' a conundrum faced many a time in Rosewood. We are operating in a universe with a total absence of plot."
