= The Wrath of Kahn =

- Pretty Little Liars episode
- Episode no.: Season 7 Episode 9
- Directed by: Chad Lowe
- Written by: Jonell Lennon
- Cinematography by: Larry Reibman
- Editing by: Melissa Gearhart
- Original air date: August 23, 2016
- Running time: 42 minutes

Guest appearances
- Brant Daugherty as Noel Kahn; Drew Van Acker as Jason DiLaurentis; Lulu Brud as Sabrina; Lindsey Shaw as Paige McCullers; Nicholas Gonzalez as Marco Furey

Episode chronology
← Previous "Exes and OMGs"	Next → "The Darkest Knight"
- Pretty Little Liars (season 7)

"The Wrath of Kahn" is the ninth episode of the seventh season of the mystery drama television series Pretty Little Liars, which aired on August 23, 2016, on the cable network Freeform. The hundred and forty-ninth episode, it was written by Jonell Lennon and directed by Chad Lowe. "The Wrath of Kahn" received a Nielsen rating of 0.5 and was viewed by 1.09 million viewers, down from the previous episode. It received positive reviews from critics.

The series revolves around a group of five women—collectively known as Liars—, who receive anonymous messages in the form of threats from an unknown person named A.D., while they struggle to survive a life with danger. In this episode, Hanna begins her plan to kidnap the dangerous Noel Kahn, while the other Liars investigate secrets of the past and present of the suspicious Mary Drake.

== Plot ==
Hanna (Ashley Benson) rages and ends up trying to make a deal with Noel (Brant Daugherty), and, indirectly, drug him in order to lock him up; however, her initial goal fails and she uses a plan B. Aria (Lucy Hale) joins Jason (Drew Van Acker) in a deep research inside Mary Drake's past, and she ends up recalling the past, when she had an affair with Jason years ago. Spencer (Troian Bellisario) finds herself desperate when she finds a flash drive in the Kahn's old cabin, containing videos of the girls when they were stuck in the A's Dollhouse. In the same flash drive, Spencer and the girls find out that Noel was helping Charlotte to torture them years ago. Emily (Shay Mitchell) confesses to Paige (Lindsey Shaw) that she is suffering again, and her relationship with Sabrina (Lulu Brud) plummets. Marco (Nicholas Gonzalez) tries his best to approach Spencer, and the two end up approaching when someone breaks into Spencer's house and she calls him to help her. Jason and Aria find out that someone manipulated the adoption files of Mary's second son, but, nonetheless, they discover that Noel's father, Steven, was responsible for the adoption, leading Aria to believe that Noel is Mary's second son. Aria receives a message from Ezra, who reveals that Nicole is still missing, and Aria is happy with the news, since Nicole could ruin her engagement with him.

The episode ends with Hanna hitting Noel in the head with a stick, after having tried to trick him.

== Production ==
The episode was directed by Chad Lowe, serving as Lowe's first directing credits on the season and the fourteenth credit on the series. Jonell Lennon served as the writer of the episode, making her first appearance as a writer on the seventh season. The title of the episode was revealed by Lennon on June 15, 2016. The table-read for the episode occurred on June 2, 2016 and filming commenced on June 15 and wrapped on June 23, 2016.

== Reception ==
=== Broadcast and ratings ===
The episode first aired in the United States on August 23, 2016, to a viewership of 1.09 million Americans, and garnered a 0.5 rating in the 18–49 demographic, according to Nielsen Media Research. Values from this episode had a decrease from the previous episode, "Exes and OMGs." This episode is rated TV-14. After Live +3 DVR ratings, the episode tied for the twenty-fifth spot in Adults 18-49, finishing with a 0.9 rating among adults aged 18–49, and aired to a total viewership of 1.80 million, placing in the twenty-second spot in viewership.

=== Reviews ===
Paul Dailly of the TVFanatic gave the episode four out of 5 stars, saying he really enjoyed the episode. Jessica Goldstein of Vulture gave the episode 3 out of 5 stars. Gavin Hetherington of SpoilerTV said he "enjoyed the episode" and that "every character had some good moment".
