= The DArkest Knight (Pretty Little Liars) =

- Pretty Little Liars episode
- From left to right: Ashley Benson (Hanna), Shay Mitchell (Emily), Lucy Hale (Aria), Sasha Pieterse (Alison) and Troian Bellisario (Spencer).
- Episode no.: Season 7 Episode 10
- Directed by: Arlene Sanford
- Written by: I. Marlene King & Maya Goldsmith
- Cinematography by: Larry Reibman
- Editing by: Robert Lattanzio
- Original air date: August 30, 2016
- Running time: 41 minutes

Guest appearances
- Keegan Allen as Toby Cavanaugh; Brant Daugherty as Noel Kahn; Lindsey Shaw as Paige McCullers; Nicholas Gonzalez as Det. Marco Furey; Rebecca Breeds as Nicole Gordon; Kara Royster as Yvone Phillips; Chloe Bridges as Sydney Driscoll; Tammin Sursok as Jenna Marshall

Episode chronology
← Previous "The Wrath of Kahn"	Next → "Playtime"
- Pretty Little Liars season 7

"The DArkest Knight" is tenth episode of the seventh season of the American mystery drama television series Pretty Little Liars. The installment was directed by Arlene Sanford and written by showrunner I. Marlene King and executive producer Maya Goldsmith. It premiered on August 30, 2016, on the cable network Freeform.

== Plot ==
Spencer calls 911 to report Hanna's abduction. At the same time, Hanna uses a knife to get some of Noel's blood to send to a DNA lab. Aria, Alison, Emily, Mona, Caleb and Spencer team up with the Rosewood P.D. to find Hanna. Detective Furey leads the investigation and promises to Spencer to find both Hanna and Noel, as Spencer kisses him on the cheek. Mona and Caleb investigate Jenna, and discover she doesn't know where either Hanna nor Noel are. Mona receives a call from Hanna and secretly leaves to assist her friend. Mona convinces Hanna to return home. Afterwards, Hanna and Caleb argue about her actions and the two end up having sex. Alison reveals to Emily that she's pregnant with Archer's baby, and they kiss. Mona threatens Jenna, stating she should get out of Rosewood. Aria looks forward to Ezra, but a newscast reveals that Nicole was found alive and, through the television, Aria sees Ezra and Nicole kissing.

The next morning, Spencer visits Toby to say goodbye, and the two end up kissing. Paige accuses Emily of being Alison's "puppet," though she did not know about the hookup or the pregnancy. Hanna is shocked when she discovers that Noel is not Mary Drake's second child, and reveals to her friends what she really had been up to. The Liars manage to distract the guards and drive to where Hanna kept Noel hostage only to find that he escaped. They find a text with an address and a 10 p.m. meeting time, stating they would swap the USB for the camera with which Hanna filmed herself torturing Noel earlier. At the same time, Mona and Caleb stalk Jenna, but end up finding out that Sydney was disguised as Jenna. The Liars arrive at the address of the text, which lead the Liars into an abandoned school for the blind where Jenna, armed with a gun, attempts to murder the Liars with Noel. However, Noel, while attacking Hanna and Emily, trips on his axe and accidentally kills himself via decapitation. Jenna then shoots at the Liars, as they run, but get separated from Spencer, who is shot. Before Jenna could cause more damage, she is taken down by Mary Drake and pulled away by "A.D." unseen.

Mary then reveals that she is Spencer's biological mother. Meanwhile, scenes reveal that, while leaving town, Toby's car crashed into a tree, leaving Yvonne's and his fate unknown. At the end, "A.D." places Jenna in their van and gives her her glasses back. She questions who they are and if they shot Spencer. "A.D." gives Jenna their mask, which she feels. She realizes she is with "A.D.", as "A.D." adjusts their hoodie and prepares to drive.

== Cast ==
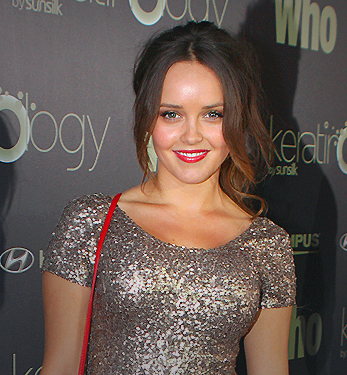
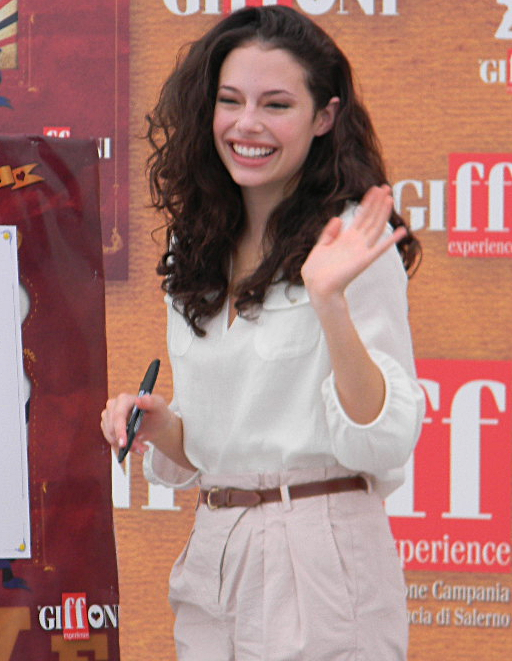
This episode marks Rebecca Breeds' (left) and Chloe Bridges' (right) first appearances in the seventh season.

Following is the list of billed cast.

=== Main cast ===
- Troian Bellisario as Spencer Hastings
- Ashley Benson as Hanna Marin
- Tyler Blackburn as Caleb Rivers, Spencer and Hanna's love interest
- Lucy Hale as Aria Montgomery
- Ian Harding as Ezra Fitz, Aria's fiancée
- Shay Mitchell as Emily Fields
- Andrea Parker as Mary Drake, Alison's aunt
- Janel Parrish as Mona Vanderwaal, the Liars' long-time friend
- Sasha Pieterse as Alison DiLaurentis

=== Recurring cast ===
- Keegan Allen as Toby Cavanaugh, Spencer's ex-boyfriend and Rosewood P.D.'s officer
- Brant Daugherty as Noel Kahn, the Liars' long-time frenemy
- Lindsey Shaw as Paige McCullers, Emily's Ex-girlfriend
- Nicholas Gonzalez as Detective Marco Furey, the Rosewood P.D.'s head detective
- Rebecca Breeds as Nicole Gordon, Ezra's missing ex-girlfriend
- Kara Royster as Yvonne Phillips, Toby's wife
- Chloe Bridges as Sydney Driscoll, Jenna's friend
- Tammin Sursok as Jenna Marshall, one of the Liars' main rivals and a worker of "A.D."

== Production ==
The episode was written by the series' creator and main collaborator I. Marlene King with executive producer Maya Goldsmith. The title of the episode was revealed by King through Twitter on June 18, 2016. The table-read for this episode occurred on June 23, 2016, while the episode was filmed in June 2016 in and around Los Angeles, California, mostly on the backlot of the Warner Bros. studio lot in Burbank.

=== Music ===
The installment features songs "Waving Wild" by Arum Rae, "Paradise" by Clementine & the Galaxy, "In the Light" by the Lumineers, and "In Too Deep" by the Sweeplings. The score is composed by Michael Suby, who works on the series since the premiere.

== Reception ==
=== Ratings ===
The episode first aired in the United States on August 30, 2016, to a viewership of 1.33 million Americans, and garnered a 0.7 rating in the 18–49 demographic, according to Nielsen Media Research. Values from this episode had a notorious increase from the previous episode, "The Wrath of Kahn." This episode is rated TV-14. After Live +3 DVR ratings, the episode tied for the twenty-fifth spot in Adults 18-49, finishing with a 1.1 rating among adults aged 18–49, and aired to a total viewership of 2.10 million, placing in the seventeenth spot in viewership.

=== Reviews ===
Louisa Mellor of Den of Geek commented, "I'm really looking forward to seeing what PLL looks like when it isn't holding anything back. I hope it's ridiculous, and beautiful, and subversive. Just like it's always been." Also on Season 7, she further added: "I complained that the show had lost its flavour, the things that made it different, and become a parody of itself. While I'm not quite retracting that argument, I do feel like season seven has been a marked improvement." G.A. Benitez of Cryptic Rock gave the episode a good review, calling it a "Mid-Season finale to die for." Mark Trammell of TV Equals praised the episode, stating, "While a little too much time was spend on the mid-season finale dealing with all the various ‘ships in play for my tastes, the ending confrontation more than made up for it, and if you’d told me we’d ever see the day that [the series] featured a full-on decapitation, I’d have told you that you were crazier than a roomful of Radley patients, and yet, here it was. You gotta love it."

On the other side, the episode received an unfavorable review from Paul Dailly, from TVFanatic, who labeled it as "one of the weakest finales to date." He added, "[the episode] was far from perfect. At this stage, a lot of the reveals felt cheap. We still have 10 episodes left, and we need answers before it's too late. Waiting until April is going to be a drag."
