= Pretty Little Liars season 7 =

Pretty Little Liars
- Season 7
- Season 7 DVD cover
- Starring: Troian Bellisario; Ashley Benson; Tyler Blackburn; Lucy Hale; Ian Harding; Laura Leighton; Shay Mitchell; Andrea Parker; Janel Parrish; Sasha Pieterse
- No. of episodes: 20

Release
- Original network: Freeform
- Original release: June 21, 2016 – June 27, 2017

Season chronology
- ← Previous; Season 6

The seventh and final season of the American mystery drama television series Pretty Little Liars, based on the books of the same name by Sara Shepard, was renewed on June 10, 2014, for two additional seasons, making the show Freeform's longest running original series.

The season consisted of 20 episodes, in which ten episodes aired in the summer of 2016, with the remaining ten episodes aired from April 2017. The season premiered on June 21, 2016 and ended on June 27, 2017, on Freeform.

Production and filming began in the end of March 2016, which was confirmed by showrunner I. Marlene King. The season premiere was written by I. Marlene King and directed by Ron Lagomarsino. King revealed the title of the premiere on Twitter on March 17, 2016. On August 29, 2016, it was confirmed that this would be the final season of the series.

== Overview ==
A.D. gives the Liars 24 hours to find Charlotte's real killer or Hanna dies. While discussing possible suspects, the girls' suspicion fell on Alison. Aria suspects the red jacket blonde she saw entering the church was Alison. Emily finds the jacket in Alison's things and Caleb gives it to A.D. Meanwhile, Hanna manages to escape. Elliot's true motive is later revealed to Alison; she managed to use his phone to alert the girls to her location when he takes her out in his car one night. She jumps out of the car and he gives chase but Hanna accidentally runs him over and they bury him in the woods.

The Liars find out Jenna is calling Elliot as "Archer" on his burner phone. Mona then traces most of the sent messages from a secret apartment where they find out his real name is "Archer Dunhill". Toby discovers this and gets the cops to release Alison who reveals that she was the red jacket blonde but only tried to comfort Charlotte. Jenna befriends Sara and Noel begins helping them. Emily confronts Jenna and Sara. Jenna reveals that she became Charlotte's friend after feeling sympathy for her in Welby and helped Archer fake his identity to be with Charlotte. Sara reveals that they are all looking for the same thing but is killed soon after. A.D. tricks Hanna into believing Archer is alive and records her digging up his grave.

The Liars find videos in Noel's cabin of him torturing them in the dollhouse. Hanna kidnaps Noel after negotiating with him doesn't work and films an interrogation video. He manages to escape and lures the Liars to an abandoned blind school. They leave the dollhouse videos on a table and someone takes them but Noel and Jenna attempt to murder them. In the confrontation, Noel is accidentally killed, and Spencer is shot by A.D., while Jenna corners Spencer. Jenna prepares to kill Spencer, but is knocked out by Mary. She then reveals that Spencer is her second child. A.D. saves Jenna who asks if they shot Spencer.

One week later, Spencer has recovered and A.D. sends Jenna to confess to the cops that Noel wanted money Charlotte left Jenna for another eye surgery, killed Sara and tried to kill Jenna in the blind school. Peter returns and reveals that Mary is the one who killed Jessica. Hanna and Spencer follow the trail of a private investigator he hired to find Mary and bump into Ted who reveals he has been hiding her as she is his college fling with whom he conceived Charles. Mary reveals to Spencer that Peter and Jessica were planning to kill her, thus she used his pills to kill Jessica. A.D. then uses Emily's stolen eggs to impregnate Alison, as a way to further torture the liars. Meanwhile, A.D. hires Sydney Driscoll as their helper and she fakes being A.D. to recruit Aria into joining the A.D. team. Aria is forced into playing and becomes A.D.'s new helper, destroying Emison's baby nursery and leaving an "A" message in Spencer's house, until the Liars catch her in the act and she defects. Mona, who is becoming addicted to the A-game again, reveals that she tried to scare Charlotte into not resuming the A-game but Charlotte attacked her and she killed her in self-defense. Mary confesses to Rollins and Jessica's murder. A.D. ends the game as they have finally learned that Mona was Charlotte's killer.

One year later, Mary escapes from prison and Mona is released from Welby but rejoins the A-Team and is sent to kidnap Spencer, who comes face-to-face with A.D. – Alex Drake, her twin sister. Mary reveals she sold Alex to a London family to get out of Radley. Alex ran away and met Wren who revealed everything about Spencer to her and introduced her to Charlotte who left her everything. She became A.D. to use the Liars to find Charlotte's killer and killed Wren as he always saw her as Alex while she wanted to become Spencer to have her "perfect life". She explains that Sara was looking for Charlotte's false treasure in the Radley which was actually the secret file and Jenna recruited Noel to look for "Charlotte's sister". Jenna uses her enhanced sense of smell to figure out "Spencer's not Spencer" and alerts Toby who tells the others. Mona reveals to them that Wren was going to kill her but she convinced him she could get Mary out. The Liars, Toby, Mona, and Caleb come face to face with Alex and Spencer as they cannot tell them apart, until Toby makes the distinction by asking what Spencer's favorite poem from a book she gave him. Mona tracked A.D.'s location has a cop arrest her. The Liars then say goodbye to one another as Aria leaves for her honeymoon with Ezra. Mona moves to Paris and the "cop" is revealed to be her boyfriend who has imprisoned Alex and Mary in her basement dollhouse. In the finale moment, a new set of liars are awakened to find their leader, Addison, has just gone missing.

== Cast ==
=== Main ===
- Troian Bellisario as Spencer Hastings and Alex Drake
- Ashley Benson as Hanna Marin
- Tyler Blackburn as Caleb Rivers
- Lucy Hale as Aria Montgomery
- Ian Harding as Ezra Fitz
- Laura Leighton as Ashley Marin^{[a]}
- Shay Mitchell as Emily Fields
- Andrea Parker as Mary Drake and Jessica DiLaurentis
- Janel Parrish as Mona Vanderwaal
- Sasha Pieterse as Alison DiLaurentis

=== Recurring ===
- Nicholas Gonzalez as Detective Marco Furey
- Keegan Allen as Toby Cavanaugh
- Tammin Sursok as Jenna Marshall
- Lindsey Shaw as Paige McCullers
- Brant Daugherty as Noel Kahn
- Holly Marie Combs as Ella Montgomery
- Chad Lowe as Byron Montgomery
- Lulu Brud as Sabrina
- Huw Collins as Dr. Elliott Rollins / Archer Dunhill

=== Guest ===
- Lesley Fera as Veronica Hastings
- Dre Davis as Sara Harvey
- Brendan Robinson as Lucas Gottesman
- Vanessa Ray as CeCe Drake / Charlotte DiLaurentis
- Kara Royster as Yvonne Phillips
- Jim Titus as Detective Barry Maple
- Chloe Bridges as Sydney Driscoll
- Nia Peeples as Pam Fields
- Drew Van Acker as Jason DiLaurentis
- Nolan North as Peter Hastings
- Julian Morris as Wren Kingston
- Roma Maffia as Lieutenant Linda Tanner
- Shane Coffey as Holden Strauss
- Rebecca Breeds as Nicole Gordon
- Ava Allan as Addison Derringer
- Torrey DeVitto as Melissa Hastings^{[b]}
- Edward Kerr as Ted Wilson
- John O'Brien as Principal Arthur Hackett
- Roberto Aguire as Liam Greene
- David Coussins as Jordan Hobart
- Meg Foster as Carla Grunwald
- Mary Page Keller as Dianne Fitzgerald
- Emma Dumont as Katherine Daly
- I. Marlene King as a wedding photographer

Notes

- ^{^[a]} Unlike the other series regulars, Laura Leighton is only credited in the episodes she appears in.
- ^{^[b]} Torrey DeVitto returns as Mellisa Hastings and the disguised version of Melissa was created by Mona Vanderwaal (also portrayed by DeVitto) in the episode "Till Death Do Us Part".

== Episodes ==
| No. overall | No. in season | Title | Directed by | Written by | Original release date | Prod. code | U.S. viewers (millions) |
|---|---|---|---|---|---|---|---|
| 141 | 1 | "Tick-Tock, Bitches" | Ron Lagomarsino | I. Marlene King | June 21, 2016 | 2M7201 | 1.43 |
In media res: Aria, Spencer, and Emily are hastily digging a hole to bury someone they killed. Four days prior, A.D. locks Hanna in a shed with no doors or windows. They periodically torture her with a water hose and a cattle prod. A.D. leverages their control over Hanna’s fate to demand the identity of Charlotte’s real killer. The girls and their allies largely agree that Alison is guilty. The group splits up to make sure no lead goes unexplored in their pursuit of evidence. Aria and Ezra look around Alison’s house for a red jacket that Charlotte’s killer may have worn. The pair is forced to abandon the search when Elliott shows up unexpectedly. They leave undetected, but empty-handed. Aria sets aside her romantic confusion and spends the night at Ezra’s loft. Mary Drake formally introduces herself as the new owner of The Lost Woods. As Charlotte’s birth mother, she has the most compelling motive to be A.D. Spencer and Toby break into Mary’s motel room to learn what they can about her. Mary is apparently well-traveled and well-read. Her Radley file says she was a frequent patient at the sanitarium into her early adulthood. Caleb and Mona begrudgingly work together to track Mary’s every move. They eavesdrop on her phone calls and hear her talking to an unknown British man. Mary knocks on Spencer’s door looking for Peter and Veronica. She seems familiar with the Hastings family, but doesn’t go into detail about their history. Mary only came back to Rosewood because she found out Jessica was dead. Spencer visits Hanna in a dream and encourages her to look for a way out. Hanna escapes through a wall vent and flags down a car driven by Mary Drake. In her hospital bed at Welby, Alison has violent episodes that Elliott manages by restraining and sedating her. When Emily gets the opportunity to ask about Charlotte, Alison cries out for forgiveness. Emily is finally convinced of Alison’s guilt when she finds a red jacket in her bedroom. Caleb wastes no time before handing the jacket over to A.D. His tunnel vision throughout the ordeal makes Spencer feel invisible. Confident that Alison is Charlotte’s killer, Elliott reveals his duplicity to her. In a British accent, he promises to keep Alison at Welby for as long as she lives.
| 142 | 2 | "Bedlam" | Tawnia McKiernan | Joseph Dougherty | June 28, 2016 | 2M7202 | 1.24 |
Hanna refuses to go to the police or see a doctor after making her escape. She doesn’t talk about what happened in the shed with A.D., but her demeanor gives away enough to raise her friends’ concerns. Hanna and Caleb discuss the moment they shared in the motel. They decide it was a mistake that shouldn’t change the status of their relationship. Spencer overhears their conversation, leaving her confused and hurt. Aria breaks up with Liam before finding out that Jillian has reassigned him to the book. Everyone agrees to be cordial for the sake of the project, but Liam’s attitude changes when he catches Aria and Ezra holding hands. Liam turns on Ezra, unable to overlook the way he and Aria originally got together. Hanna tries to restore her relationship by bringing Jordan to the bar where they first met, only to discover that the building no longer exists. Hanna realizes that she is looking for something that’s been gone for a long time. She returns Jordan’s engagement ring and, having unwritten her future, she agrees to go into business with Lucas. Spencer loses her job in D.C. due to her prolonged physical and mental absence. Mary opens up to Spencer about the incident that landed her in Radley. When they were teenagers, Jessica asked Mary to take over for her at a babysitting job. The parents came home to find their child was dead, and everyone believed Jessica when she said Mary was responsible. Alison calls Emily and makes a desperate plea for help before the line disconnects. Elliott has changed Alison’s patient instructions to disallow most visitors. Emily teams up with Mary, using her familial connections to get into Alison’s hospital room. Alison is barely lucid and struggling to connect with her surroundings. She is about to expose Elliott’s true intentions when he interrupts the visit. Elliott pulls Mary aside and starts a heated argument with her. Emily can’t hear the exchange, but the two apparently know each other better than she thought. Mary disapproves of the way Elliott is treating Alison. Elliott warns Mary not to interfere, reminding her of the payout she’s been promised. At night, Alison is drugged and wheeled through the halls of Welby. She sees the fluorescent lights of the operating room just before losing consciousness.
| 143 | 3 | "The Talented Mr. Rollins" | Zetna Fuentes | Jonell Lennon | July 5, 2016 | 2M7203 | 1.12 |
Elliott’s lies are so numerous that the girls don’t seem to know one real thing about him. Emily starts working as a bartender at The Radley. She promises Sabrina that the incident with Ezra’s key was not an accurate representation of her character, and Sabrina agrees to give Emily a second chance. Hanna wears a replica engagement ring to hide her break-up with Jordan. Caleb confesses his recent infidelity to Spencer. Hanna and Caleb both maintain that the moment was just that, but Spencer isn’t convinced. She’s tired of being in love with someone whose attention feels impermanent. Elliott repeatedly overpowers, sedates, and physically restrains Alison. The liars present their concerns to the head doctor at Welby. He checks on Alison but finds no evidence that her care is being mishandled. Elliott’s connection to Mary remains a mystery. Spencer offers to get Toby on the case but changes her mind when she sees the ring on Yvonne’s finger. Desperate to rescue Alison, Emily goes to Toby herself. Toby searches a police database and finds a brief record of Elliott Rollins from 1958. Spencer hears from Jason who, it turns out, had no idea that Alison was hospitalized. Aria takes pictures of everything inside Elliott’s storage bench. Spencer analyzes the photos and takes note of the materials Elliott used to pose as Detective Wilden. She also recognizes a stimulant that can cause hallucinations if overdosed. Aria and Hanna go to Amish country to confirm another of Elliott’s lies. A young girl claims that Elliott and Charlotte were romantically involved. She has a set of dolls that Charlotte gifted her, each with the name and face of one of the liars. Aria pushes for Hanna to open up about her abduction, but Hanna is afraid to recount the experience. She ends up revealing a small piece of what A.D. put her through after seeing a cattle prod at the Amish farm. Elliott realizes his storage bench has been tampered with. He quickly packs up and smuggles Alison out of Welby. Alison covertly shares her location, and the girls drive into the woods with Hanna at the wheel. When Elliott pops a tire, Alison takes the opportunity to run. He chases after her on foot, Hanna hits the brakes too late, and Elliott flies head-first through the windshield of Lucas’s car.
| 144 | 4 | "Hit and Run, Run, Run" | Michael Goi | Maya Goldsmith | July 12, 2016 | 2M7204 | 1.26 |
The odds of proving Elliott’s death was an accident are slim, so the girls decide to bury his body and make it look like he skipped town. Aria uses Elliott’s key card to sneak Alison back into Welby. Alison is afraid to return to her hospital room, but she must be found in Elliott’s restraints for his crimes to be exposed. Aria asks outright if Alison killed Charlotte. While Alison admits to being at the church that night, Charlotte was still alive when she left. Spencer is cleaning the floor of the barn when Caleb shows up unexpectedly. He pours his heart out through the locked door, and Hanna overhears everything. Once Aria swipes out of Welby, Spencer’s job is to put Elliott’s phone and jacket on a train out of state. A man named Marco asks to buy Spencer a drink at The Radley and, whether to strengthen her alibi or forget her relationship woes, she accepts. Emily has just finished packing an overnight bag with some of Elliott’s things when Spencer calls. She’s too drunk to drive, let alone take care of her part of the plan. Emily covers for Spencer and brings her home. As usual, Mona is several steps ahead of the liars. She gets Lucas’s windshield fixed by someone who won’t snitch and makes the girls aware of Elliott’s burner phone. Hanna begins to spiral thinking about the futility of covering up Elliott’s death. She confesses to Mona that, in hindsight, there was enough time to stop the car. The next morning, the girls are approached by Jenna Marshall. She claims to be in town for Toby’s engagement, but Toby is clearly surprised to see his step sister. The two allude to a failed attempt they made to reconcile a few years prior. Hanna encourages Spencer to tell Caleb the truth about Elliott, but when Spencer gets home, Caleb and his belongings are gone. Hanna realizes with horror that she’s lost one of her bracelets. She and Mona find it in Elliott’s car along with the missing burner phone. A call comes in from Jenna asking for “Archer.” Toby tells the girls that the man claiming to be Elliott Rollins is missing, and that finding him is the P.D.’s top priority. At Welby, Mary tells Alison that she’s “in charge” now that Elliott is gone.
| 145 | 5 | "Along Comes Mary" | Norman Buckley | Bryan M. Holdman | July 19, 2016 | 2M7205 | 1.17 |
Alison is released from Welby under the condition that Mary lives with and supervises her. Mary regrets being manipulated by Archer, and while Alison doesn’t trust her estranged aunt, she knows how it feels to need a second chance. The man Spencer met the night of Archer’s death turns out to be the investigation’s lead detective, Marco Furey. The police find Archer’s car at the train station, but the trail doesn’t end there. Someone uses one of Archer’s credit cards to rent a car before heading out west. It is unknown who the driver is or why they are continuing to fabricate Archer’s movements. Prior to his death, Archer drained the money from all of Alison’s bank accounts, including her shares of The Carissimi Group. Mona analyzes Archer’s burner phone and reads through his texts. The night he took Alison out of Welby, Archer messaged his accomplice to inform them that Alison didn’t kill Charlotte. Aria and Emily investigate an apartment that Archer had been renting in secret. They find a wealth of evidence, most notably a copy of Shakespeare’s Twelfth Night belonging to “Archer Dunhill.” Emily poses as Archer and invites his accomplice to the apartment, but Toby interrupts before the meeting can happen. Emily oversleeps and misses an important exam, but still receives an excellent grade. A.D. takes credit for the favor. Despite feeling put off by Emily’s distracted behavior, Sabrina happily agrees to a second date. Spencer finds out from Toby that Caleb disappeared on purpose to sort out his thoughts. Hanna asks what she can do to help, and Spencer urges her to consider where her true feelings lie. Aria answers Ezra’s phone when a call mysteriously comes in from Nicole. Ezra is finally in a good place with his grief, so Aria keeps the call a secret. She also doesn’t mention anything about the situation with Archer. When Ezra proposes, Aria doesn’t know how to respond. A.D. returns Alison’s red jacket with a note exposing her friends for turning her in. The girls suspect that Jenna could be Archer’s accomplice, especially after she extends her stay at The Radley. Jenna and Sara meet and quickly bond over their hatred of the liars. The devilish duo becomes a terrible trio when Noel Kahn enters the picture.
| 146 | 6 | "Wanted: Dead or Alive" | Bethany Rooney | Lijah J. Barasz | August 2, 2016 | 2M7206 | 1.10 |
The cops discover Archer Dunhill’s real identity and existing criminal record. Their latest theory is that he’s pretending to flee the state while continuing to lurk around Rosewood. Spencer pulls Marco aside and preemptively shuts down the idea of exploring a relationship. Aria is afraid Ezra would regret proposing if he knew the trouble she’s gotten into recently. Hanna remembers feeling the same way with Jordan, but she thinks Ezra can handle the truth. In the spirit of honesty, Hanna comes clean about her break-up with Jordan. Aria tells Ezra what happened to Archer, and the two make their engagement official. Caleb admits that his feelings for Hanna aren’t entirely gone. Spencer gives Caleb credit for restarting her heart when she thought it would never beat again. Hanna and Spencer discuss their break-ups, and Spencer encourages Hanna to reach out to Caleb. Mary is surprised and touched to hear that Charlotte used to go by “Drake.” She swears she never saw Charlotte after the day she was born. When Archer’s burner phone rings, Hanna hears the voice of Archer himself on the other end. If he really is alive, the driver that ran him down has a target on her back. Mary hides out in her room at The Lost Woods, as she expects Archer to come after her for flipping. Emily confronts Jenna directly about her involvement with Archer. Jenna says she helped Archer get his fake identity as a favor for her friend, Charlotte. Now, she suspects the liars were involved in Archer’s disappearance. Jenna prevents Sara from delivering a warning to Emily, and Sara’s dead body is later found in the hotel shower. Alison has a hard time being around her friends now that she knows they turned her in to A.D. The patrol officer outside Alison’s house is replaced by an assailant in a latex mask, and Alison narrowly keeps her life in the attack. She realizes with embarrassment how easily she fell for A.D.’s trick to separate her from her support system. The only way to be sure that Archer is dead is to return to the scene of the crime. Hanna and Spencer bring their shovels to the woods and confirm Archer is right where they left him, being eaten by the maggots. 'A' ending: A.D. watches footage of Hanna and Spencer digging up Archer’s grave.
| 147 | 7 | "Original G'A'ngsters" | Melanie Mayron | Kateland Brown | August 9, 2016 | 2M7207 | 1.16 |
The recent attempt on Alison’s life inspires the girls to prioritize their friendship. Emily insists on treating her mother to dinner for her birthday despite the guilt Pam feels for celebrating without Wayne. A bachelorette party invites Emily and Pam to join the festivities, and they have a fantastic night. Ezra floats the idea of eloping to Tuscany. Aria is hesitant to leave her friends behind, but Emily encourages her to follow her heart. Aria and Ezra are headed out the door when the FBI shows up with news that Nicole might be alive. While Toby and Jenna tried to reconcile a few years ago, the progress they made reset when Jenna tried to kiss him. Someone breaks into Toby’s trailer to steal Mary’s Radley file, and Yvonne is hospitalized with moderate physical injuries. Spencer urges Toby to leave Rosewood. He takes the advice, making preparations for a move to Maine with Yvonne. The police rule Sara’s death an accident. Hanna looks for Jenna’s laptop in her hotel room, but finds only a locked box. Caleb gets the key, and Spencer helps photograph the contents: a stack of coded documents. The girls hide when Noel enters the room. He stashes Mary’s Radley file and makes an angry call to someone named Dr. Cochran. Caleb gets to work cracking Jenna’s code, and Hanna tells him about her break-up with Jordan. Jason comes home and promptly tells Mary to get lost. Alison protests his demands and arranges for the three of them to have dinner. Jason recruits Aria to come along and back him up, much to Alison’s annoyance. Aria and Jason briefly discuss a secret encounter from years back. Mary describes seeing Jason once at Aunt Carol’s house but says Jessica kept them from meeting. Alison takes note when Mary mentions a storm cellar on the property. The girls go to Aunt Carol’s to investigate. They find files Jessica had on each of the girls, although Aria’s is missing. A record of Mary’s treatment at Radley says that she gave birth a second time after Charlotte, and that Dr. Cochran was her obstetrician. A.D. sets off Spencer’s car alarm and manages to lock the girls inside the vehicle. A countdown begins, and when it reaches zero, the storm cellar explodes. 'A' ending: A.D. has files on Aria and Noel. They douse Noel’s in alcohol and light a match.
| 148 | 8 | "Exes and OMGs" | Kimberly McCullough | Charlie Craig | August 16, 2016 | 2M7208 | 1.11 |
A.D. stays one step ahead of the liars no matter how actively they investigate each lead. The memory of her captivity bolster’s Hanna’s need to identify the person responsible. Considering Noel’s bad reputation and sketchy behavior, she is confident that he is A.D. A foreboding nightmare and an eerie warning from Mrs. Grunwald make Hanna even more sure of her convictions. Caleb continues to lend his technological services to the cause, although he has yet to crack the lock box code. Principal Hackett recommends Emily for an open position as Rosewood High’s head swim coach. To Emily’s surprise, Paige is interviewing for the same job. The two catch up over dinner at The Grille. Later, Paige looks disappointed to see Emily on a date with Sabrina. Without any savings to fall back on, Alison is forced to return to her teaching job earlier than expected. Her students display a gross lack of empathy for her situation. Alison finds Noel’s student file in the school’s main office, but it contains only a taunting message from A.D. A van from Nicole’s Habitat for Humanity group has been spotted near an infamous rebel camp in Colombia. Ezra is paralyzed with uncertainty while he waits for answers. Aria confesses to deleting Nicole’s call from Ezra’s phone. Hoping to amend her mistake, Aria gets Ezra on a last-minute flight to Colombia. Aria and Spencer track down Dr. Cochran’s daughter in Brookhaven. She’s initially unwilling to help the girls find her estranged father, but changes her mind after her office is ransacked. Dr. Cochran tells Aria and Spencer about his time working as Radley Sanitarium’s on-call obstetrician. According to him, while Charlotte had been given to Jessica and Kenneth, Mary’s second child was placed in the custody of Family Services. Hanna is tired of watching her friends spin in circles when it seems obvious that Noel is guilty. She warns Caleb that she’ll be difficult to reach for a few days, and the two bid each other an uncertain goodbye. Hanna makes a shady deal over the phone and papers over the windows at an unknown location.
| 149 | 9 | "The Wrath of Kahn" | Chad Lowe | Jonell Lennon | August 23, 2016 | 2M7209 | 1.09 |
Hanna’s friends aren’t convinced that she left town on an innocent business trip. They work to get in touch with her and anyone who might know her whereabouts. At the same time, they search for definitive proof of Noel’s guilt that they can take to the police. Archer appears to have fled to France, expanding the case outside of the Rosewood P.D.’s jurisdiction. Marco asks Spencer on a date, but she politely declines. He leaves his number with her in case she changes her mind. Emily is forced to keep much of her life a secret from Sabrina. While interviewing for the head swim coach position, Emily remembers how it feels to have Paige as her confidant. Emily lets Paige know that the danger they faced in high school is back. Aria tells Jason about Mary’s second child. They go to the courthouse together, and after some persuasion, the clerk hands over the adoption records. The only information that can be gleaned from the heavily-redacted text is that Noel’s father was the judge who oversaw the case. Spending time with Jason reminds Aria of their whirlwind romance a couple years prior. Aria resists temptation and refocuses her gaze on Ezra. Four hostages are rescued from the Colombian jungle, but Nicole isn’t one of them. Spencer and Emily investigate Noel’s family cabin. They find a flash drive with footage from the dollhouse in which Noel can be clearly identified. Aria and Emily want to wait for Hanna before bringing the damning evidence to the police, but Spencer goes over their heads and contacts Marco. A raging storm and a power outage allow a hooded figure the perfect opportunity to steal the flash drive. The danger is gone by the time Marco arrives, but Spencer asks him to stay anyway. After touching base with Caleb, the girls realize that Hanna is conducting a solo mission to take down Noel. Hanna sets up a makeshift interrogation room. She finds Sara’s phone in Noel’s trash and uses it as leverage against him. Hanna conducts a decoy negotiation with Noel while sliding him a drink spiked with powerful sedatives. Unfortunately, Noel sees through the ruse. Hanna switches to plan B, which involves taking Noel from behind with a baseball bat.
| 150 | 10 | "The DArkest Knight" | Arlene Sanford | I. Marlene King & Maya Goldsmith | August 30, 2016 | 2M7210 | 1.33 |
Hanna’s gone radio silent, and the girls are afraid she’s been abducted by Noel. Detective Furey makes finding Hanna his top priority. Hanna ties an unconscious Noel to a chair and points a camera at him before taking a knife to his leg. She brings a vial of his blood to a DNA lab. Hanna calls Mona for backup, and Mona quickly finds Noel’s flash drive on his person. It’s all they need to lock him up, but Hanna has a personal vendetta to satisfy. Mona convinces Hanna to come home and helps her invent a cover story to explain where she’s been. Caleb can sense that Hanna is lying. His frustration with her morphs into passionate love, and the two have sex. Alison and Paige each believe the other is manipulating Emily for her affection. When Alison finds out that she’s pregnant, Emily is quick to comfort her. Alison kisses Emily, and Emily reciprocates. Hours after Ezra’s plane lands, Aria still hasn’t heard from him. Her panic turns to incredulity when the news breaks that Nicole has been found alive. Toby gives Marco tips on how to win Spencer over. Spencer visits Toby when Yvonne is away and asks him for one last kiss. The police later find Toby and Yvonne unconscious at the scene of a car crash. Mona and Caleb try to keep tabs on Jenna, but they end up getting fooled by Sydney Driscoll. She poses as a decoy while the real Jenna leaves The Radley undetected. Hanna’s DNA test confirms that Noel is not Mary’s child. Noel escapes his bindings, swipes Hanna’s camera, and flees. The liars are directed to an abandoned school for the blind where they can trade Noel’s flash drive for Hanna’s camera. After the swap, all hell breaks loose. Jenna has a gun, Noel wields an axe, and they both stalk around the building with intent to kill. In a struggle with Hanna and Emily, Noel is decapitated by his own blade. A shot rings out, and Spencer takes a bullet to the chest. Mary emerges from the shadows and incapacitates Jenna before rushing to Spencer’s side. She holds Spencer in her arms and makes a startling claim: “I’m your mother.” 'A' ending: A.D. drags Jenna from the building and puts her in the back of a van. Jenna asks A.D. if they shot Spencer.
| 151 | 11 | "Playtime" | Chad Lowe | Allyson N. Nelson & Joseph Dougherty | April 18, 2017 | 2M7211 | 1.33 |
One week after the events of the last episode, Toby is well but Yvonne is in a coma while Spencer has recovered. Ezra arrives and reveals he hasn't told Nicole about him and Aria getting married. Hanna and Caleb are back together and Mona helps her get back into the fashion business. Emily is appointed coach of the varsity swimming team and Paige is made an athletics supervisor at Rosewood High. The Liars are given an interactive board game by "A.D." which shows the area of notable places of Rosewood and figurines of the Liars. Spencer plays the game and receives a puzzle piece and a letter from Mary. Hanna tries to destroy the game but a video appears showing that "A.D." knows they killed Rollins. "A.D." ending: "A.D." has Jenna in a dark room without her glasses. She's drinking a cup of tea and asks for more information about the game. "A.D." takes the teacup and throws a binder with a lot of papers written in braille on her lap. After reading the top of the first page, Jenna mutters "end game".
| 152 | 12 | "These Boots Were Made for Stalking" | Ron Lagomarsino | Oliver Goldstick | April 25, 2017 | 2M7212 | 0.92 |
The Liars question what to do with the board game. Emily refuses to play and leaves. Aria learns that Ezra might have been engaged to Nicole before she went missing and while they started dating again. Meanwhile, Emily battles with a student named Addison Derringer who despises her. Spencer asks Marco to track down Mary Drake and shows him the letter that her mother had written to her before she was born in Radley. Jenna, having been in hiding, returns and claims that Charlotte left behind money for her eye surgery. She further says Noel wanted it, threatened Jenna, and murdered Sara. Emily confronts Addison but Paige interferes and reveals that Addison sent an email to a friend gloating about how she was going to get rid of Emily.
| 153 | 13 | "Hold Your Piece" | Marta Cunningham | Bryan M. Holdman | May 2, 2017 | 2M7213 | 0.86 |
Hanna is sure Jenna is to blame for a recent professional setback and is forced to bring Caleb up to speed on current events. He tries to help take apart the game but is hurt by a poisonous gas when he tries to remove one of the buildings on the game. Aria and Emily team up to investigate Sydney for more information about Jenna and her connection to "A.D." and discover that she is working for "A.D." after they find her making a deposit for a surgery for Jenna. They realize that "A.D." is paying Jenna off for helping with the blind school and confront Sydney, who claims that "A.D." is simply an anonymous client. Sydney leaves, however, Aria plants a tracking device in her bag. At the hospital, Yvonne finally wakes up from the coma. Toby suggests they get married there and they have their own hospital room ceremony by themselves, right after, Yvonne passes away. Spencer grows closer to Detective Furey, while Aria struggles with her current situation with Ezra, and Hanna's turn at the game is more intense than she bargained for, leading to shocking consequences.
| 154 | 14 | "Power Play" | Roger Kumble | Lijah J. Barasz | May 9, 2017 | 2M7214 | 0.91 |
Ali's turn at the game forces her to make a drastic decision to abort her child but is haunted when "A.D" reminds her of when she was in the psychiatric hospital and was wheeled into an operating room. Alison is traumatized to remember that Emily's donated eggs were implanted inside her uterus, realizing Emily is her child's mother. Spencer has a long overdue conversation with her father about his past sins and recent whereabouts. Emily continues to navigate working at Rosewood High with both Ali and Paige, learning the truth about Ali's pregnancy. Meanwhile, Paige contemplates leaving Rosewood, but decides against it, resulting in her and Emily renewing their relationship. Aria continues to question the fate of her relationship with Ezra after Nicole's arrival and bristles under "A.D.'s" taunts. While searching for Mary, wanting answers from her, Hanna and Spencer run into Pastor Ted, who eventually reveals himself as Charlotte's biological father. He also reveals that Lucas was Charlotte's old childhood friend. Meanwhile, Aria discovers that Sydney is on the A-Team, working with "A.D.". Sydney and "A.D." offer Aria the chance to join the A-Team.
| 155 | 15 | "In the Eye Abides the Heart" | Troian Bellisario | Joseph Dougherty | May 23, 2017 | 2M7215 | 0.85 |
After being blackmailed by "A.D.", Aria supplies info to them about the Liars findings. Detective Furey reveals to Spencer that she used Archer's credit card to buy drinks when they first met and she is now a suspect in Archer's death. After some arguing, Ezra finally agrees to leave Nicole behind for Aria, while Emily encourages Ali to not get an abortion and raise her child. Emily tells Paige that she is going to help Ali raise her baby. That night Paige and Alison discuss Emily, while finally making up after years of hate. Realizing that Emily loves Alison, Paige leaves Rosewood and Emily for good. After learning about Lucas' relation with Charles, Hanna sets out to prove he is innocent, but finds more evidence that he is "A.D", when the Liars find a comic book made by Lucas and Charles, that heavily resembles the "A" game. Hanna tells Mona about the game and tries to convince her to help. Meanwhile, "A.D." sends Aria to retrieve the comic book for them, and in return she is gifted the official "A" uniform. "A.D." ending: "A.D." is busy playing around with Aria's face that they created during their snapchat videos, while "A.D.", masquerading as Aria, holds a secret file of Aria's, while they laugh uncontrollably.
| 156 | 16 | "The Glove That Rocks the Cradle" | Paula Hunziker | Maya Goldsmith | May 30, 2017 | 2M7216 | 0.90 |
Spencer steals a flash drive from Marco's apartment about Lucas' alibi confession to the police the night Archer was killed. "A.D." sends Aria to destroy Alison and Emily's nursery. In Hanna's turn at the game, "A.D." makes her pick up something at the computer repair shop and bring it to Rosewood High School. The Liars have a confrontation with Lucas where he explains to them that he didn’t know Charles and Charlotte were the same person, or that Charlotte was "A". A second comic book exists and depicts turning vengeance into a game. Aria breaks down in remorse after her plot to destroy the nursery. Meanwhile, Caleb and Hanna return to Lucas’s loft with the hard drive Hanna picked up. The audio file contains a Patsy Cline song. Hanna remembers that "A" played a different Patsy song in the Dollhouse. Alison finally admits her feelings to Emily. "A.D." ending: "A.D." has the second comic book. They are shown sketching the ending of the comic book. They draw a gravestone and write "Here lies".
| 157 | 17 | "Driving Miss Crazy" | Oliver Goldstick | Francesca Rollins & Oliver Goldstick | June 6, 2017 | 2M7217 | 0.97 |
With Mona making inroads in the game, Emily reluctantly teams up with her to investigate the doctor who performed Ali's procedure. Ashley returns to Rosewood to check on Hanna and asks Caleb what his intentions are with her daughter, to which he admits that he wants to marry Hanna and the two become engaged. Meanwhile, "A.D." sends Aria to deliver a gift to the Hastings family that contains a voice recording of Peter and Mary discussing Jessica's murder, leaving Spencer more confused than ever about whom to trust. Ezra notices Aria's change in attitude and fears he may have lost her; and "A.D."'s machinations cause Aria to have a terrifying nightmare.
| 158 | 18 | "Choose or Lose" | Norman Buckley | Charlie Craig | June 13, 2017 | 2M7218 | 0.96 |
The Liars have been served with search warrants at their homes. Spencer goes to the police station where she finds out that the case is now being investigated by Detective Tanner. The Liars are sent a phone with a timer that tells them to "Choose or Lose". Caleb and Hanna get married at the courthouse with Ashley as a witness. Caleb and Ezra find the cell tower location from which the game phone has been sending signals from, and later discover that they are being sent from Mona's house. While leaving to find Spencer, Aria discovers Archer's corpse is in her car trunk, just as a police car pulls up to confront her.
| 159 | 19 | "Farewell, My Lovely" | Joseph Dougherty | Joseph Dougherty | June 20, 2017 | 2M7219 | 0.83 |
The Liars are told by Caleb that Mona has the board game and jump to conclusions that Mona is "A.D.". Mary meets with Spencer at Lost Woods Resort and gives her ownership of the building. Mona reveals that Charlotte never recovered and was going to resume the A-game. She confronted Charlotte and threatened to push her out the window but never planned to go through with it. When Hanna, Caleb and Spencer take Mona back to their car, the final two puzzle pieces are waiting. Later, the Liars gather in a room at the Lost Woods and put the two final puzzle pieces in. When the pieces are in place, the game says "Congratulations. Claim the grand prize", a picture of Archer. Augmented reality shows a man walking toward Aunt Carol’s house. The Liars are arrested by Tanner at Aunt Carol's where Archer's body is found. Mary lies and says she killed Archer, also confessing to Jessica's murder, saving the Liars from a murder charge. Mona reveals that after she stopped threatening her, Charlotte attacked Mona and in the struggle she accidentally killed Charlotte in self-defense. "A.D." ending: "A.D." drives off into the sunrise with the Liars' game pieces in a plastic bag.
| 160 | 20 | "Till Death Do Us Part" | I. Marlene King | Story by : I. Marlene King & Kyle Bown; Teleplay by : I. Marlene King & Maya Goldsmith | June 27, 2017 | 2M7220 | 1.41 |
A year later, Aria and Ezra prepare to be married while Alison and Emily have twin daughters, Grace and Lily but Alison soon proposes to Emily who accepts. Before the wedding, Ezra goes missing and Aria becomes frantic that after finding out about her fertility, he had abandoned her. On the other hand, Spencer is kidnapped by Mona working for A.D. and brought to a bunker. There, A.D. is revealed to be Alex Drake, the identical twin sister to Spencer and that she met Wren and in turn met Charlotte who she was close with. After Charlotte's death, she returned to Rosewood but became jealous of her sister's life and impersonated Spencer while vowing revenge. Wren is revealed to have died after Alex killed him because he tried to stop her plan and that he fathered Alison's twins. With the help of Mona, the group find Ezra and Spencer and they manage to escape from an axe-wielding Alex who is arrested alongside Mary, after she tries to convince Toby that she is Spencer. Mona is revealed to have kept Alex and Mary in her personal Dollhouse, while the Liars are gathered one last time before Aria leaves for her honeymoon. Addison's friends are having a sleepover in Rosewood, but finds Addison has gone missing, ending the series.

== Specials ==
| Special no. | Title | Narrator(s) | Aired after | Original air date | U.S. viewers (million) |
|---|---|---|---|---|---|
| 1 | "Pretty Little Liars: A-List Wrap Party" | I. Marlene King & The Cast of Pretty Little Liars | "Till Death Do Us Part" | June 27, 2017 | 0.62 |
Showrunner I. Marlene King and the Liars sit down for an hour long unbarred and uncensored tell-all after series finale to discuss all of the series’ tightly held secrets, behind-the-scenes insights, and top moments.

== Production ==
=== Development ===
The seventh season was ordered with the sixth season on June 10, 2014, right before the fifth-season premiere aired, which made the show as ABC Family's longest running original series, surpassing The Secret Life of the American Teenager, which was ABC Family's previous longest running original series. The season will consist of 20 episodes, in which ten episodes will air in the summer of 2016, with the remaining ten episodes beginning to air in April 2017. Charlie Craig, who served as writer/consulting producer on the second season, will return for the seventh season as executive producer/co-showrunner. I. Marlene King revealed the title of the premiere "Tick-Tock, Bitches" on Twitter. Variety announced that season premiere would air on June 21, 2016, the latest for a season premiere in the show's history. Additionally, series star Troian Bellisario would make her directorial debut this season. Bellisario is set to direct the fifteenth episode of the season. A promo was released on May 12, 2016. Freeform released a promotional poster for the season, on June 7, 2016. After the season premiere, Freeform released another poster which included Ashley Benson. On August 29, 2016, I. Marlene King with the principal cast of the show announced that Pretty Little Liars would end after the seventh season. King also announced that the show would start airing the second half of the season later than usual, in April 2017 and that the series finale would be a two-hour episode event. It was reported on October 26, 2016, that a tell-all special will air after the series finale "Till Death Do Us Part", where the main cast and showrunner I. Marlene King talked about the show and behind-the-scenes exclusive also the writing assistant bc_emperor has confirmed that.

==== Final season speculation ====
The seventh season had been speculated by both fans and the cast and crew of the show to being the final season of Pretty Little Liars ever since the show was renewed for two additional seasons. In an interview with BuzzFeed, Troian Bellisario said “This is the beginning of the end. But the best part about these last two years is that, because it’s the beginning of the end, we can actually start telling the story I think we’ve been waiting to tell for a long time." Regarding the show's ending, Lucy Hale said to E! News that "Seven seasons will definitely end the show." Showrunner I. Marlene King commented on these rumors to TVLine as she said "We have enough story to take us to the end of Season 7, and we’re going to let the fans tell us if they’re ready to say goodbye to this world and these characters." She confirmed to being open for an eighth season and a movie and a new book.

In an interview with Variety regarding the five-year time-jump from the sixth season, King said "I think that this story when we're back will end next year at the end of Season 7". She later took to Twitter where she confirmed that the current storyline that began in the second half of the sixth season would end after the seventh season, but would not necessarily mean that the show would end after the seventh season. Hale said on The Late Late Show with James Corden that the show was ending after the seventh season. Bellisario's fiancé Patrick J. Adams said in June 2016, that the show was ending in 2017, as the couple has decided to get married after the show ends. Freeform gave out a statement not long after saying that "There has been no official decision made for PLL beyond a season 7." It was announced on August 29, 2016, the day before the mid-season finale would air, that Pretty Little Liars will end after the seventh season.

=== Filming ===
Production began on February 1, 2016, when King announced on Twitter that the writers were in full swing brainstorming and mapping the seventh season. Production and filming began in the end of March 2016 and officially wrapped up in October 2016.

=== Casting ===
The seventh season has nine roles receiving star billing, with eight of them returning from the previous season, six of which was part of the original cast from the first season. The season saw the four protagonists of the series continue the roles as they try to take down the new 'A'. Troian Bellisario played Spencer Hastings, who has relationship problems with Caleb, while Ashley Benson played Hanna Marin, who was kidnapped at the end of last season. Lucy Hale continued her role as Aria Montgomery as she is set in a love triangle with Ezra and her boyfriend Liam. Shay Mitchell portrayed Emily Fields who begins to rekindle her relationship with Alison. Sasha Pieterse continued to portray Alison DiLaurentis as Alison struggles with being in a psych-ward. Janel Parrish returned as Mona Vanderwaal who seems to be finally on their side. Tyler Blackburn continues to play Caleb Rivers and Ian Harding also continued his role as Ezra Fitz. Andrea Parker was added as a series regular, playing Jessica DiLaurentis' twin sister Mary Drake.

After the sixth-season finale, it was announced that Andrea Parker would return to the show as Mary Drake, Jessica DiLaurentis' identical twin sister and biological mother to Charlotte DiLaurentis. TVLine later confirmed that Parker was added as a series regular for the upcoming season. Deadline reported on May 10, 2016, that actor Nicholas Gonzalez was cast as Detective Vic Furey, a character who will oversee the Rosewood Police Department. The character was later renamed Det. Marco Furey. Tammin Sursok announced that she will return to the show as Jenna Marshall after last appearing in the fifth-season episode "How the 'A' Stole Christmas". On June 2, 2016, Variety reported that Brant Daugherty would be returning as Noel Kahn; Brant has not appeared on the show since the beginning of the fifth season.

On June 10, 2016, The Hollywood Reporter reported that Lindsey Shaw would be returning as Paige McCullers after leaving in the fifth season mid-season premiere. The actress playing Sydney Driscoll, Chloe Bridges, posted an image on social media, confirming that she would return to the show after last appearing in the Christmas special episode. On July 28, 2016, The Hollywood Reporter reported that Shane Coffey would be returning as Holden Strauss; Shane has not appeared on the show since the beginning of the third season. It was announced on August 8, 2016, that Ava Allan will appear on the show, and will first appear in the second half of the season as Addison. On August 17, 2016, TVLine reported that Edward Kerr would be returning to the show as Pastor Ted Wilson in the second half of the season. Kerr had not been on the show since towards the end of the fifth season.

== Reception ==
=== Live + SD ratings ===
| No. in series | No. in season | Episode | Air date | Time slot (EST) | Rating/Share (18–49) | Viewers (m) | Rank (18–49) |
|---|---|---|---|---|---|---|---|
| 141 | 1 | "Tick-Tock, Bitches" | June 21, 2016 | Tuesdays; 8:00 p.m. | 0.7 | 1.43 | 11 |
| 142 | 2 | "Bedlam" | June 28, 2016 | Tuesdays; 8:00 p.m. | 0.6 | 1.24 | 15 |
| 143 | 3 | "The Talented Mr. Rollins" | July 5, 2016 | Tuesdays; 8:00 p.m. | 0.5 | 1.12 | 12 |
| 144 | 4 | "Hit and Run, Run, Run" | July 12, 2016 | Tuesdays; 8:00 p.m. | 0.6 | 1.26 | 7 |
| 145 | 5 | "Along Comes Mary" | July 19, 2016 | Tuesdays; 8:00 p.m. | 0.6 | 1.17 | 15 |
| 146 | 6 | "Wanted: Dead or Alive" | August 2, 2016 | Tuesdays; 8:00 p.m. | 0.5 | 1.10 | 12 |
| 147 | 7 | "Original G'A'ngsters" | August 9, 2016 | Tuesdays; 8:00 p.m. | 0.6 | 1.16 | 9 |
| 148 | 8 | "Exes and OMGs" | August 16, 2016 | Tuesdays; 8:00 p.m. | 0.6 | 1.11 | 14 |
| 149 | 9 | "The Wrath of Kahn" | August 23, 2016 | Tuesdays; 8:00 p.m. | 0.5 | 1.09 | 16 |
| 150 | 10 | "The DArkest Knight" | August 30, 2016 | Tuesdays; 8:00 p.m. | 0.7 | 1.33 | 11 |
| 151 | 11 | "Playtime" | April 18, 2017 | Tuesdays; 8:00 p.m. | 0.7 | 1.33 | 4 |
| 152 | 12 | "These Boots Were Made for Stalking" | April 25, 2017 | Tuesdays; 8:00 p.m. | 0.5 | 0.92 | 10 |
| 153 | 13 | "Hold Your Piece" | May 2, 2017 | Tuesdays; 8:00 p.m. | 0.4 | 0.86 | 11 |
| 154 | 14 | "Power Play" | May 9, 2017 | Tuesdays; 8:00 p.m. | 0.5 | 0.91 | 9 |
| 155 | 15 | "In the Eye Abides the Heart" | May 23, 2017 | Tuesdays; 8:00 p.m. | 0.4 | 0.85 | 11 |
| 156 | 16 | "The Glove That Rocks the Cradle" | May 30, 2017 | Tuesdays; 8:00 p.m. | 0.4 | 0.90 | 8 |
| 157 | 17 | "Driving Miss Crazy" | June 6, 2017 | Tuesdays; 8:00 p.m. | 0.5 | 0.97 | 2 |
| 158 | 18 | "Choose or Lose" | June 13, 2017 | Tuesdays; 8:00 p.m. | 0.5 | 0.96 | 7 |
| 159 | 19 | "Farewell, My Lovely" | June 20, 2017 | Tuesdays; 8:00 p.m. | 0.4 | 0.83 | 9 |
| 160 | 20 | "Till Death Do Us Part" | June 27, 2017 | Tuesdays; 8:00 p.m. | 0.7 | 1.41 | 2 |
| 721 | | "A-List Wrap Party" | June 27, 2017 | Tuesday; 10:00 p.m. | 0.3 | 0.62 | 14 |

=== Live + 7 Day (DVR) ratings ===
| No. in series | No. in season | Episode | Air date | Time slot (EST) | 18–49 rating increase | Viewers (millions) increase | Total 18–49 | Total viewers (millions) | Ref. |
|---|---|---|---|---|---|---|---|---|---|
| 141 | 1 | "Tick-Tock, Bitches" | June 21, 2016 | Tuesdays; 8:00 p.m. | 0.5 | 1.05 | 1.2 | 2.48 | |
| 142 | 2 | "Bedlam" | June 28, 2016 | Tuesdays; 8:00 p.m. | 0.4 | 0.82 | 1.0 | 2.05 | |
| 143 | 3 | "The Talented Mr. Rollins" | July 5, 2016 | Tuesdays; 8:00 p.m. | 0.4 | 0.74 | 0.9 | 1.85 | |
| 144 | 4 | "Hit and Run, Run, Run" | July 12, 2016 | Tuesdays; 8:00 p.m. | 0.4 | 0.76 | 1.0 | 2.01 | |
| 145 | 5 | "Along Comes Mary" | July 19, 2016 | Tuesdays; 8:00 p.m. | —N/a | —N/a | —N/a | —N/a | —N/a |
| 146 | 6 | "Wanted: Dead or Alive" | August 2, 2016 | Tuesdays; 8:00 p.m. | 0.5 | 0.84 | 1.0 | 1.94 | |
| 147 | 7 | "Original G'A'ngsters" | August 9, 2016 | Tuesdays; 8:00 p.m. | 0.5 | 0.95 | 1.1 | 2.11 | |
| 148 | 8 | "Exes and OMGs" | August 16, 2016 | Tuesdays; 8:00 p.m. | 0.5 | 0.86 | 1.1 | 1.97 | |
| 149 | 9 | "The Wrath of Kahn" | August 23, 2016 | Tuesdays; 8:00 p.m. | 0.5 | 0.71 | 0.9 | 1.80 | |
| 150 | 10 | "The DArkest Knight" | August 30, 2016 | Tuesdays; 8:00 p.m. | 0.4 | 0.77 | 1.1 | 2.10 | |
| 151 | 11 | "Playtime" | April 18, 2017 | Tuesdays; 8:00 p.m. | 0.4 | 0.85 | 1.1 | 2.19 | |
| 152 | 12 | "These Boots Were Made for Stalking" | April 25, 2017 | Tuesdays; 8:00 p.m. | —N/a | —N/a | —N/a | —N/a | —N/a |
| 153 | 13 | "Hold Your Piece" | May 2, 2017 | Tuesdays; 8:00 p.m. | —N/a | —N/a | —N/a | —N/a | —N/a |
| 154 | 14 | "Power Play" | May 9, 2017 | Tuesdays; 8:00 p.m. | 0.4 | 0.85 | 0.9 | 1.77 | |
| 155 | 15 | "In the Eye Abides the Heart" | May 23, 2017 | Tuesdays; 8:00 p.m. | 0.5 | 0.98 | 0.9 | 1.83 | |
| 156 | 16 | "The Glove That Rocks the Cradle" | May 30, 2017 | Tuesdays; 8:00 p.m. | 0.5 | 0.91 | 0.9 | 1.82 | |
| 157 | 17 | "Driving Miss Crazy" | June 6, 2017 | Tuesdays; 8:00 p.m. | 0.5 | 0.93 | 1.0 | 1.90 | |
| 158 | 18 | "Choose or Lose" | June 13, 2017 | Tuesdays; 8:00 p.m. | 0.4 | 0.93 | 0.9 | 1.90 | |
| 159 | 19 | "Farewell, My Lovely" | June 20, 2017 | Tuesdays; 8:00 p.m. | 0.5 | 0.79 | 0.9 | 1.62 | |
| 160 | 20 | "Till Death Do Us Part" | June 27, 2017 | Tuesdays; 8:00 p.m. | —N/a | —N/a | —N/a | —N/a | —N/a |
