= Emily Fields =

Fictional character

- Pretty Little Liars character
- Shay Mitchell as Emily Fields in the television series.
- First appearance: Pretty Little Liars (2006)
- Created by: Sara Shepard
- Portrayed by: Shay Mitchell
- Voiced by: Cassandra Morris (Pretty Little Liars–Wanted); Katie Schorr (The Liars)
- Adapted by: I. Marlene King
- Born: November 19, 1993 (age 32); Rosewood, Pennsylvania

In-universe information
- Full name: Emily Catherine Fields (formerly Fields-DiLaurentis)
- Nicknames: Em; Emmy (by her parents); Americano (by CeCe); Mermaid (by Alison)
- Gender: Female
- Occupation: Rosewood High School Swim Coach (currently); Bartender (formerly)
- Family: Novel: Ryan Fields (father); Kathleen Fields (mother); Jake Fields (brother); Beth Fields (sister); Carolyn Fields (sister); Television: Wayne Fields (father; deceased); Pam Fields (mother)
- Significant others: Novels: Ben Coogan (ex-boyfriend); Maya St.Germain (ex-girlfriend;); Isaac C (ex-boyfriend/father of her child); Courtney DiLaurentis (love interest; deceased); Trista Taylor (Fling); Kelsey Pierce (ex-girlfriend); Alison DiLaurentis (Kissed, ex-crush); Jordan Richards (nd; deceased); Television: Alison DiLaurentis (ex-wife); Paige McCullers (ex-girlfriend); Samara Cook (ex-girlfriend); Lydnon James (kissed; deceased); Talia Sandoval (ex-girlfriend); Sara Harvey (ex-girlfriend; deceased); Sabrina (ex-girlfriend); Maya St. Germain (ex-girlfriend; deceased); Ben Coogan (ex-boyfriend)
- Children: Novel: Violet Baker (daughter); Television: Lily DiLaurentis-Fields (biological daughter, conceived with Wren Kingston but raised with Alison DiLaurentis); Grace DiLaurentis-Fields (biological daughter, conceived with Wren Kingston but raised with Alison DiLaurentis)
- Religion: Novel: Catholicism
- Nationality: American
- Residence: Rosewood, Pennsylvania
- Cousins: Novel: Allen Weaver; Abby Weaver; John Weaver; Matt Weaver; Elizabeth Weaver; Sarah Weaver; Karen Weaver
- Seasons: All seasons; 1–7
- Education: Rosewood High School (graduated); Pepperdine University (dropped out during her last year after her father's death); Hollis College (graduated)

Emily Catherine Fields is a fictional character created in 2006 by author Sara Shepard. She is a character in both Pretty Little Liars' books and television series, and initially appears as a "jock girl" and one of the main protagonists of the story. She is part of the group known as the Liars; and is best friends with the four other members, who are also protagonists. Emily is known for her description and shyness, as well as for being part of a conservative family, the Fields.

Emily's characteristics and stories have the same methodology in both books and television. However, there are some perceptual differences between the two versions, since the television series usually does not follow the books' scripts. For example, Emily's parents on the screen have different names from the books, and in the books, she has siblings, while in the television series, she does not. Another noticeable difference between the two versions is the physical and psychological characteristics. The character is portrayed by Shay Mitchell in the television series.

For her portrayal, Mitchell was nominated twice for a Teen Choice Award, once for a People's Choice Award, and shared a nomination for an MTV Fandom Award with Sasha Pieterse for Ship of the Year.

== Character in print ==
Pretty Little Liars is a series of novels that follows the lives of four teenage girls nicknamed the Pretty Little Liars or simply the Liars, whose clique falls apart after the disappearance of their queen bee leader, Alison DiLaurentis. Three years after her disappearance, the girls begin receiving threatening messages from an anonymous character named "A", who threatens to expose their secrets, including long-hidden ones they thought only Alison knew. Shortly after the messages begin, Alison's body is discovered buried in her yard. The books progress with the four girls trying to figure out who "A" is and facing many dangerous obstacles and twists.

In the first book, Emily is introduced as a loyal, sweet girl who struggles with her sexuality. She is described as having hazel eyes and strawberry-blonde hair that is tinted blue-green due to chlorine. At her school, Emily is recognized by the students for her achievements in swimming. Emily is largely motivated by matters surrounding family, romance, and ambition. Emily is also superstitious, although most of her superstitions are unique only to her; for example, making a wish at "4:56" instead of "11:11".

=== Story lines ===
Emily develops a romantic attraction for her best friend Alison DiLaurentis. She dated a boy named Ben Coogan before realizing her true feelings were for girls. She falls for and secretly dates Maya St. Germain. When "A" outs Emily to the whole school, her parents force her to go to Tree Tops, a "de-gaying" rehabilitation center. Failing that, Emily is shipped off to Iowa to live with relatives; deeply unhappy there, she runs away. Her parents ask her to come home, stating that they will learn to accept Emily for who she is. Emily comes to discover that she's bisexual, when she falls for and eventually sleeps with a boy named Isaac Colbert. Although they break up soon after, Emily learns she's pregnant and secretly gives the baby up for adoption during summer break. As a senior in high school, she accidentally meets Kelsey, a girl whom Spencer framed for drug possession the past summer; Emily ends up falling for her, but the relationship ends when Kelsey attempts suicide.

In Burned, while on a school-hosted cruise for spring break, Emily begins a new relationship with Jordan, a criminal who is on the run and being pursued by the FBI. Jordan is arrested and sent to prison on a tip from "A"/Alison. She is later murdered by someone paid by Alison, who had Jordan killed out of revenge for "stealing" Emily from her. Severely depressed and increasingly desperate, Emily contemplates committing suicide and very nearly attempts it; she is only talked out of it when the Liars remind her that it's what Alison wants: for them to die.

In the last book, Emily and the other Liars are later put on trial after Alison fakes her own death and frames them for it (setting it up to look like the Liars took revenge on Alison for everything she did to them). Emily, unbeknownst to the other Liars, fakes her own suicide to trick Alison. Emily tracks down Alison and Alison's mother, who are in hiding, and after a confrontation with them, is able to expose them as criminals. After Alison's trial, she moves out to California and begins a new relationship with a girl named Laura, finally feeling at peace.

Having fallen in love with Alison in the seventh grade, she frequently fantasizes about Alison still being alive and loving Emily back. Emily admits to being somewhat obsessed with Alison, priding herself on knowing everything about her. For a brief period, when Alison comes back as "Courtney", the two have a romantic relationship; Emily is heartbroken when Alison reveals it was all a lie. Unbeknownst to the other girls, Emily attempted to save Alison from the DiLaurentis' burning Poconos house. She feels tremendous guilt over her actions, especially after Alison returns as "A". However, eventually, Emily begins to hate Alison; Jordan's death at Alison's hands sends Emily into a spiral of rage and deep depression. Following Jordan's death, Emily swears revenge on Alison and remarks that she would not mind killing Alison.

Emily's closest friends are the other Liars, and during the periods when they are not associating with one another, Emily is very lonely. She is quite popular at school but feels as though she's not close with anyone. She is constantly searching for a "best friend" to take Alison's place. Though she is well-liked by the other Liars, they are often annoyed by how sensitive she is and her devotion to Alison, especially Spencer. Emily's insistence that Alison is alive often causes problems for them as a group. Her relationship with her family is strained, predominantly due to her bisexuality and "A"-related events. She ends up severing ties with her family at the end of the series.

== Character on screen ==
=== Casting ===
Shay Mitchell was cast in the role of Emily Fields in a regular capacity in December 2009. Mitchell had initially auditioned for the role of Spencer and then tried for Emily.

=== Background ===
In the television adaption, Emily's personality is almost the same as her book counterpart. She is the jock of the group and swims competitively at school. In the show, she is of Irish/Scottish, Korean and Filipino descent. She has long dark hair and brown eyes and dresses fashionably. In addition, she is a lesbian and is not superstitious. She eventually takes off the friendship bracelet Alison gave to her in an attempt to let go of her feelings for Alison.

=== Season 1 ===
Emily was a former student at Rosewood High School in Rosewood, Pennsylvania, a star and a non-competitive swimmer. A year before the start of the series, Emily had been best friends with Alison DiLaurentis (Sasha Pieterse), a cruel popular girl who went missing one day. At the beginning of the school year, Emily befriends a girl named Maya St. Germain (Bianca Lawson), her new next-door neighbor whose family has moved into the old DiLaurentis house. Emily and Maya instantly bond, and the next day they kiss when Emily walks her home. The appearance of "A" reveals that Emily is questioning her sexuality and may have been in love with Alison. After Maya stays over at Emily's house for a night, Ben (Steven Krueger), Emily's boyfriend, senses that Emily is losing interest in him; he attempts to rape her in the school locker room but is stopped by Toby (Keegan Allen). Grateful and not wanting to deal with her homosexuality, Emily grows closer to Toby, despite the warnings of her friends, who believe him to be "A"/Alison's killer.

Emily goes with Toby to Homecoming, much to the dismay of her friends; Emily later admits to Toby that she wants to come with Maya. Convinced by her friends that Toby is dangerous, the two get into a physical confrontation; as Emily tries to run away, she trips and hits her head, falling unconscious. Toby drops her off at the hospital in Rosewood, which convinces Emily that he is innocent. When a tornado warning traps everyone inside the high school, Emily finds herself haunted by memories of Alison. That day, she is outed by Detective Darren Wilden (Bryce Johnson), who accuses her of destroying Alison's memorial in the park (when, in reality, Emily had been trying to salvage what she could from the wreckage). Emily tearfully confesses to her friends that she was in love with Alison; although surprised, they are instantly accepting of her being a lesbian. "A" later mails Emily's mother (Nia Peeples) a copy of the same picture of Emily and Maya kissing. Although devastated, she doesn't confront Emily about it, instead later showing it to Emily's father (Eric Steinberg) when he returns home from his tour of duty in Afghanistan.

Toby comes to visit Emily to prove that he is innocent, but when he is arrested, he believes that she is responsible for it. Believing that Emily and Toby were involved romantically, Emily's father confronts her about it; after denying that anything is going on, she ends up coming out to her shocked father. Emily's relationship with her parents soon becomes very strained due to the truth about her sexuality, although her parents attempt to accept her by inviting Maya over to dinner. Although Emily's father soon warms to Maya, Emily's mother tells her that she is disgusted by Emily being gay. Believing Maya has corrupted Emily, she can have Maya sent away to "True North", a camp for juvenile delinquents, which causes Emily and her mother's relationship to suffer even more.

When Emily re-joins the school's swim team after a brief injury, she finds herself in a rivalry with Paige McCullers (Lindsey Shaw), an excellent swimmer who had taken Emily's place in her absence. A title from an episode, If at First You Don't Succeed, Lie, Lie Again Highly competitive, Paige lashes out at Emily with homophobic insults, later even physically threatening her. Soon after, however, Paige apologizes to Emily, explaining that she was jealous of how "easy" Emily's life seemed. After Paige's homophobic and demanding father accuses Emily of getting preferential treatment, Emily's mother stands up to him, which helps to repair the relationship between Emily and her mother. Paige apologizes for her father later that evening and comes out to Emily by kissing her. Having grown close despite their rocky start, Emily and Paige begin to secretly date. They break up when Emily expresses dissatisfaction with having to hide their relationship and Paige gets jealous seeing a girl from another school, Samara Cook (Claire Holt), flirting with Emily. Emily's father is sent to Fort Hood in Killeen, Texas, to help with military training, and Emily's mother reveals to Emily that they are moving down to Texas to join him. Emily is dismayed, feeling as though she has only just begun to fit in at Rosewood.

Emily recalls a memory from the day Alison went missing: Alison visited her and gave her a snow globe, which, unbeknownst to Emily at the time, contained a key to a storage locker. Realizing Alison had hidden something away, the girls use the key to discover a series of videos that Ian Thomas had filmed. Believing that Ian is A/Alison's killer, the girls make plans to confront him. Their plans go astray when A kills Ian and takes his body from the crime scene, leaving the police suspicious of Emily and her friends.

=== Season 2 ===
Hoping to convince her mother to stay in Rosewood, Emily considers faking a letter from a college swim scout; deciding it would be wrong, she rips up the letter. However, A makes an unaltered, undamaged copy and sends it to Emily's mother. Emily can stay in Rosewood, but feels guilty, confiding in Samara, her new girlfriend. When Emily's mother moves to Texas, Emily goes to live with Hanna.

Ian (Ryan Merriman) is found dead of an apparent suicide, but Emily realizes that Ian's suicide note is a mash-up of lines from A's messages. Emily then stumbles upon Logan Reed (Tilky Jones), the messenger who had been sent to pick up money for Ian, after the girls blackmailed him in an attempt to reveal him as Alison's killer. When Emily relays this information to Officer Garrett Reynolds (Yani Gellman), who has been assigned to "watch" the girls, he later pays off Reed to keep him quiet, preventing Emily from doing any further investigating. Emily's relationship with Samara begins to suffer when Samara tells her she isn't interested in dating exclusively; they later break up after "A" forces Emily to give Samara's friend her phone number as a sign of flirtation.

A concludes that Emily is the "weak link" in the group and begins to torment her as much as possible. That, combined with the added stress and guilt from the fake college letter, lands Emily in the hospital with a stomach ulcer. While there, it is revealed that "A" secretly dosed Emily with HGH, forever ruining Emily's chances of getting a swimming scholarship. Emily then reunites with Maya, who is now living a few towns over; they both decide to take things slow and see if they are interested in rekindling their relationship.

Dr Sullivan (Annabeth Gish), the girls' therapist, goes missing, and the girls are forced to go on a mission to save her. "A" sends Emily to a barn in the woods; she ends up getting locked inside and passes out due to carbon monoxide poisoning. Emily is then visited by Alison, who explains that she knows the identity of A, but can't reveal it to Emily, shortly before kissing her. Emily is rescued by her friends but remains uncertain if Alison is alive or if it was just a dream. The girls are then arrested soon after, having been caught with a piece of evidence the police suspect to be the murder weapon used on Alison.

Emily and the other girls plot to try and trick "A" by pretending Emily is being frozen out of the group. The plan is only moderately successful; however, the girls can get access to A's phone. Meanwhile, Emily is forced to deal with her new relationship with Maya, who is desperate to avoid getting sent back to True North. Emily later finds out that she can't go back because her soon-to-be killer was there and wants Emily to go with her to San Francisco to save her. When Emily rejects leaving, Maya disappears. Emily believes Maya has run off to San Francisco to stay with some friends, and is distraught. She attempts to find Maya, to no avail. Things are soon complicated by Paige; having recently come out, she hopes to rekindle her and Emily's relationship. Emily's father returns to Rosewood briefly to attend a father-daughter dance. He later tells Emily that he has been assigned on another tour in Afghanistan. After his departure, Emily's mother makes plans to return home to Rosewood.

With the girls charged with the challenge of unmasking "A" at the school's masquerade ball, Emily is on edge. At the ball, she meets Paige; the two talk and come to the mutual agreement that for now, they will be just friends. After Mona (Janel Parrish) is revealed to be "A" and subsequently arrested, Emily and the other girls come home to find the police at Emily's house. Emily's mother explains that Maya has been murdered and her body found at the DiLaurentis house. Upon hearing this, Emily breaks down, comforted by the other girls.

=== Season 3 ===
Now a senior, Emily has spent the last five months away from her friends, helping build houses in Haiti as well as partying and drinking heavily to the point of blackouts. She is still depressed over Maya's death, but is at the same time angry at being treated like she is "made out of glass". When the Liars reunite after their time apart, Emily goes missing during the night and is later found by the other girls standing over Alison's dug-up grave, unable to remember the events leading up to that point. Realizing it is a set-up, the Liars create an alibi for themselves and cover their tracks. Emily's guilt over what happened distances her even more from the Liars, and she finds comfort in Nate St. Germain (Sterling Sulieman), Maya's cousin, who has recently moved to Rosewood to attend Hollis.

In "That Girl is Poison" Emily discovers that her flask had been drugged with a sleeping pill, causing her to black out. In "Stolen Kisses", she learns that on the night she was drunk, she had visited Paige, kissing her before leaving. Paige feels guilty about what happened, believing she took advantage of her, and Emily is shocked and confused about this new revelation. That evening she returns to Paige's house and explains that she realized there was a reason she ended up at Paige's house when she was drunk: she wanted to be with Paige. The two kiss, rekindling their relationship.

Emily becomes depressed after watching old videos of Maya on Maya's website but is cheered up by Paige. In "What Lies Beneath", Emily and Hanna discover that Maya had been hiding in Noel Kahn's (Brant Daugherty) family's cabin, and had never actually left Rosewood. Upset by this, Emily and Nate comfort one another, only to end up kissing. She confesses to Paige about kissing Nate, who explains that Emily is simply confused over her connection to Maya through Nate. Emily then rebuffs Nate's further romantic advances, stating that she just wants to be friends.

When the Liars suspect Paige of being "A" in the mid-season finale, "The Lady Killer", Emily steps in to defend her, putting up a wall between herself and the other girls. Stressed over the Liars' constant insistence of Paige's guilt and Garrett's upcoming trial, Emily joins Nate for the weekend at a secluded cabin in the woods. However, after being warned to "get out" by "A", Emily discovers that Nate was in fact at True North with Maya; Nate admits that his real name is Lyndon James. Angry at Emily for "taking" Maya from him, Lyndon reveals he has kidnapped Paige and plans to murder her in front of Emily. Emily escapes but is caught by Lyndon in a nearby lighthouse while attempting to call 911. During the ensuing struggle, Emily stabs Nate, fatally wounding him. She then reconciles with the other Liars when they realize Paige is innocent.

=== Season 4 ===
Emily starts to struggle to know if Alison is alive or not. She takes some pills from her mother's medicine cabinet gets drowsy and groggy, and causes an injury during a swim meet which puts her out of action. The situation gets worse when someone calls Social Services to her parents in an attempt to get her away from them, which does not happen. In addition, Emily's mother is suspended from work because Emily stole a key from Pam's desk to invade Officer Wilden's office to find evidence about Alison, and the P.D. ends up blaming Pam for that. Shortly after, "A", drives a car through Emily's house, leaving her and her mother no other option but to rent a motel. Later, Jessica DiLaurentis (Andrea Parker) offers Emily Alison's old room to stay in temporarily. Emily stays in the DiLaurentis house for a while until she moves to Spencer's, due to the house's creepiness. Throughout the season, Emily, Hanna, and Spencer start to investigate Ezra to discover if he is or is not "A." In the season finale, Alison appears, and they finally get some answers about the night Ali disappeared.

=== Season 5 ===
With Alison back in Rosewood, Emily gets supportive and protective of her. She befriends newcomer Sydney (Chloe Bridges) and becomes her swimming coach. However, Emily discovers Sydney is a friend of Jenna and breaks all ties with her. Alison apologizes for the way she treated Emily in the past, and they kiss; however, any possibility of romance is squashed when Emily starts to think that Alison is "A." Emily and Paige rekindle their romance, which is rapidly ended when Paige is forced to move to California. Lonely and heartbroken over Paige's departure, Emily starts a relationship with her new co-worker Talia (Miranda Rae Mayo). However, when Emily discovers that Talia is married and their relationship is calming down, she breaks up with her. Emily volunteers in a beauty pageant when Hanna, who wants money for college, loses. Later, the girls discover Alison's innocence and try to clear Alison's name and free Hanna. In the season finale, Emily and the others are arrested as accomplices to Mona's murder; however, on the way to prison, their van is hijacked by "A."

=== Season 6 ===
In the aftermath of the Liars' abduction orchestrated by "A," Emily befriends a former missing girl, Sara Harvey (Dre Davis), who was also Charles/"A's" prisoner. She is trying to help Sara adapt again into society, with the cost of denying her stuff. Nicole (Rebecca Breeds), the supervisor of Habitat for Humanity,. offers Emily the option of moving to another country to help new people, and Emily gets forced to decide on her future. She chooses to stay in Rosewood and move on with Sara, only to be betrayed when Sara is revealed to be "A's" right-hand woman. Later, Emily goes to Pepperdine University but drops out later when her father dies. She starts to work as a bartender in Los Angeles but returns to Rosewood at Alison's request, and also to depose on Charlotte's release from psychological hospital. A new "A", now entitled "A.D.", surfaces, and steals Emily's eggs, which she donated to gain money for college. She starts to investigate Sara, who is free from jail, believing she's the new stalker. Also in this season, Emily befriends Sabrina (Lulu Brud), the new-in-charge at the Brew, which in the following season leads to a brief hook-up.

=== Season 7 ===
In "Tick-Tock, Bitches", Emily goes to Welby State Psychiatric Hospital to see Alison, who is blaming herself for something. Worried, Emily drives to Alison's house and finds the sweater that a blonde girl was using the night Charlotte died. Meanwhile, Hanna is held captive by "A.D.", who asked the Liars, Caleb, and Ezra to find out who is Charlotte's killer. Emily gives the sweater to the group and Caleb flees, giving it to "A.D." in hopes of saving Hanna. After, in "Bedlam", Hanna returns home after being rescued by Mary Drake. Emily explains to Hanna who Drake is, confirming that she was a patient at Radley Sanitarium, and is Jessica DiLaurentis' twin sister. Hanna then concludes that Mary is “Uber A.” They take her to Lucas's apartment, where Hanna retains a strange and rude behavior. Emily calls Spencer to talk outside the apartment, saying that Hanna has the look of fear she had while she was stuck in the Dollhouse. They also argue about Alison's safety at Welby State, with Spencer saying she's safe locked up, and Emily denying it. Back at the Welby State, Emily tries to visit Alison, but a nurse confirms that only family members can see her, and following, Elliott (Huw Collins) repeats that Alison's condition isn't the best and rapidly avoids his conversation with Emily, leaving her unresigned. Following, Emily tells Spencer that Alison sounded frightened, and Emily urges the possibility of using Mary to visit Alison, since Mary's family. However, Spencer declines the idea. Aria, Emily, and Spencer go talk with Elliott to gain the opportunity to visit Alison, and he continues to deny it. While Elliott is talking with someone on the phone, the girls receive a new message from “A.D.” and they realize that the stalker maybe is not so far as they think. At the Radley Hotel, Mary shows up and starts remembering the old Radley Sanitarium. Emily helps her and they deal to visit Alison together. At the psychiatric hospital, Alison wakes up and sees Emily. Alison claims Emily's help, stating that Elliott is a bad person, and Alison sees Mary and starts thinking that she is her mother, Jessica. However, Elliott enters the room, and he kicks out everybody, including the nurse (Gwen Holloway). In the hallway, Elliott asks to talk with Mary; and, inside an office, Mary complains that she has been calling Elliott for two days, without an answer and tells Elliott that he has gone too far. Elliott says that Mary should not appear in the hospital and tells her to leave him to his work. Emily, meanwhile, is watching their shadows through an unfocused window. Later, during "The Talented Mr. Rollins", the Liars come up with a plan to help Alison, and, while in the woods, Hanna accidentally hits Elliott with her car, killing him instantly. Afterward, Emily, Spencer, and Aria bury Elliott's body and cover their tracks towards his death. Emily and Aria go to visit Alison the next day at Welby State and discover that the police know about Elliott stealing the Carissimi Group money and is after him.

Throughout "Along Comes Mary" and "Wanted: Dead or Alive", Emily and Sabrina spend the night together and Emily gets late for a test. However, days later, while preparing a type of drink, Emily receives a message, which alleges that she scored 92% in the exam. Sequentially, a message from "A.D." is received, revealing that he took the exam for Emily. Emily contacts the mysterious person who was helping Elliott through his burner phone, and she and Aria drive to Elliott's secret apartment. Aria and Emily find a mess that had been used to cover up Elliott's traces. The two discover that Archer's surname is Dunhill, and connect directly to the acronym "A.D." They also found a fake head, several pictures of Darren Wilden's physical characteristics, passports, and a notebook with different types of payments. Emily and Aria get scared when someone tries to enter the apartment; however, they open the door when discover that is Toby. He says the police found out about the apartment in a document found in Elliott's car. Toby commands the girls to leave and gets angry when he discovers that they have left fingerprints in some objects. Emily and Sabrina mark a new encounter on Saturday. At the Radley, Emily arrives at Jenna's room to deliver two drinks. Emily peeks into Jenna's laptop but is stopped by Sara, who screams at her. Emily reveals to the two that someone is stalking her and her friends, after which Jenna (Tammin Sursok) tells Emily a story of when Charlotte was still checked in the psychiatric hospital. In the flashback, Charlotte enlists Jenna's help to find her birth mother and make Archer Dunhill the alias of Elliott Rollins to purposefully meet Alison and take advantage of her good intentions for her eventual release. Jenna then reveals she's angry because of Charlotte's death. Emily leaves the room, but before she does, Sara warns Emily, trying to say that someone is dangerous. However, she is interrupted before saying who is in danger, when Jenna calls her. Emily tells Alison about what Jenna revealed to her, and Alison gets angry. After, in the DiLaurentis' house, Alison receives Hanna's call warning her about the danger; after, Alison invites the cop who is securing her house to enter. However, when she goes to her room, the officer—who is actually "A.D" with a mask—attacks her. During the struggle, Alison rips off part of the mask, claiming that she saw Elliott, but A.D. retreats when the police's siren is heard. Emily comforts Alison after the confusion fades. By the end of "Wanted: Dead or Alive", a maid discovers Sara's dead body in her apartment.

In "Original G'A'ngsters", Emily and her mother, Pam (Nia Peeples), are running and exercising through the city forest and Emily decides to take her to celebrate her birthday in the Radley. They celebrate later as her mother enters a group of brides-to-be women. During "Exes and OMGs", she receives a job offer from Principal Hackett (John O'Brien) to work as a swim coach at the school and finds out that Paige (Lindsey Shaw) has returned to Rosewood and is also a candidate for the job. Paige reveals to Emily that she almost joined the Olympics, but a car accident ended up destroying that possibility. Plus, in "The Wrath of Kahn", Emily reveals to Paige about the new "A.D.", and her relationship with Sabrina plummets. Meanwhile, in "The Darkest Knight", Alison reveals to Emily that she's pregnant with Archer's baby, and they kiss. Paige accuses Emily of being Alison's "puppet," though she doesn't know about the hookup or the pregnancy. Later, the Liars go to a school for the blind to find out more about Mary Drake and "A.D.", and Jenna, armed with a gun, attempts to murder the Liars with Noel. However, Noel, while attacking Hanna and Emily, trips on his axe and accidentally kills himself via decapitation. Jenna then shoots at the Liars, as they run, but gets separated from Spencer, who is shot. Before Jenna can cause more damage, she is taken down by Mary Drake and pulled away by "A.D." unseen. Mary then reveals that she is Spencer's biological mother.

In the midseason premiere, Emily and Paige are introduced to Rosewood High's staff as a swimming coach and athletic department supervisor, respectively, which causes Alison to feel jealous of Paige. Alison and Emily discuss Alison's jealousy toward Paige. Ultimately, Alison verbally fights with Paige during a school staff reunion, leaving things awkward. After, in "These Boots Were Made for Stalking", Emily is accused by high school student Addison Derringer (Ava Allan) of being inappropriate, while Addison gathers photos of Emily with Alison. Paige tries to solve the situation, but Emily ends up screaming at Addison; ultimately, Paige calls Addison's father and she's called to the Principal's room. Following, in "Hold Your Piece", Aria and Emily team up to investigate Sydney for more information about Jenna and her connection to "A.D".

==== Pretty Little Liars: The Perfectionists ====
Two-years have passed since the reveal of A.D. Emily and Alison have since gotten married and are still co-parents to their twin daughters. However, they still struggle to move beyond their complicated past. While they love each other and remain married, it has become hard for them to trust one another and figure out who they are without 'A'.

In the fourth episode, Alison received papers from the Rosewood County family and law courts. She ignored the papers along with the influx of missed calls and texts from Emily. When Mona finally confronted Alison, she explained that she saw a picture of Emily and the girls on Instagram that morning. Emily wasn't wearing her wedding ring, which she assumed meant that she had moved on. Mona helped her realize that if she had moved across the country she must have known how this was going to end, to which Alison admitted to convincing herself that Beacon Heights was the fresh start she thought would help her marriage.

A few days later, she texted Emily that she was sorry for having avoided her, but the last step had been really hard for her. She then tearfully signed the divorce papers and removed her wedding ring, setting it on the papers as she cried. She looked solemnly at a picture of her, Emily, and the twins on her mantle.

==== Pretty Little Liars (2022) ====
In the second season episode "Chapter Fifteen: Friday the 13th", Tabby Haworthe and Imogen Adams break into Dr. Sullivan's office and go through the private practice files, finding some on Emily, Spencer Hastings, Hanna Marin and Aria Montgomery.

== Reception ==
=== Critical ===
Drusilla Moorhouse of E! Online writes that the character has "transformed from a confused girl to a badass babe". The Florida Family Association has condemned the character for her sexuality, and General Mills has subsequently pulled their advertising. However, GM denied that they did so over the character's sexual identity. The character debuted on After Ellen's Hot 100 at number seven. The role, for many folks, made a huge impact on the LGBTQ community and opened up many conversations for the time.

=== Awards and nominations ===
Year	Award	Category	Recipient	Outcome
2011	Young Hollywood Awards	Cast to Watch	Shay Mitchell, Troian Bellisario, Lucy Hale, and Ashley Benson	Won
2014	Teen Choice Awards	Choice Summer TV Star: Female	Shay Mitchell	Nominated
2015	MTV Fandom Awards	Ship Of The Year	Shay Mitchell and Sasha Pieterse (for Emily and Alison's relationship)	Nominated
2015	Teen Choice Awards	Choice TV Actress: Drama	Shay Mitchell	Nominated
2016	People's Choice Awards	Favorite Cable TV Actress	Shay Mitchell	Nominated
2016	Teen Choice Awards	Choice Summer TV Actress	Shay Mitchell	Nominated
