= Playtime (Pretty Little Liars) =

- Pretty Little Liars episode
- Episode no.: Season 7 Episode 11
- Directed by: Chad Lowe
- Written by: Allyson N. Nelson & Joseph Dougherty
- Cinematography by: Craig Fikse
- Editing by: Jill D'Agnenica
- Original air date: April 18, 2017
- Running time: 42 minutes

Guest appearances
- Keegan Allen as Toby Cavanaugh; Lesley Fera as Veronica Hastings; Lindsey Shaw as Paige McCullers; Nicholas Gonzalez as Det. Marco Furey; Shane Coffey as Holden Strauss; Emma Dumont as Katherine Daly; Tammin Sursok as Jenna Marshall

Episode chronology
← Previous "The Darkest Knight"	Next → "These Boots Were Made for Stalking"
- Pretty Little Liars (season 7)

"Playtime" is the eleventh episode of Pretty Little Liars' seventh season and the 151st episode overall. It first aired on the Freeform network in the United States on April 18, 2017. The installment was directed by Chad Lowe and written by Allyson Nelson and Joseph Dougherty. Upon its original airing in the United States, the episode was watched by 1.33 million people.

In the aftermath of Spencer's (Troian Bellisario) shooting, things get messy in the Hastings residence when Veronica (Lesley Fera) reveals things about the family's past. Meanwhile, the Liars struggle with their own personal problems, and with "A.D.", who has decided to play the final game.

== Plot ==
Spencer (Troian Bellisario) is rescued by paramedics, and during a quick question session, she gets stunned, not knowing which surname to use, Hastings or Drake. At the hospital, the Liars find out that Toby (Keegan Allen) suffered an accident and is in the same hospital, while they begin to suspect that "A.D." is gone since Noel died. It is revealed through the Liars' conversation that Mary ran away after she revealed that she is Spencer's biological mother.

One week later, Toby reveals to Aria (Lucy Hale) that Yvonne is under induced coma, and Aria says Spencer is home safe and sound after the shooting. Meanwhile, Spencer looks for Mary in the Lost Woods Resort, but is unsuccessful. Aria packs to leave Ezra's (Ian Harding) apartment, but he suddenly appears, not letting her go. Hanna (Ashley Benson) and Caleb (Tyler Blackburn) wake up and decide to track down Jenna (Tammin Sursok), while Caleb promises to never lose Hanna from sight again. Emily (Shay Mitchell) and Paige (Lindsey Shaw) are introduced to Rosewood High's staff as swimming coach and athletic department supervisor, respectively. Paige leaves and Alison (Sasha Pieterse) comes in the room, revealing to Emily that she went to a doctor and she is indeed pregnant with Archer's child. Alison finds herself in a jeopardy when she discovers that Paige is a supervisor. Ezra reveals to Aria that he hasn't talked to Nicole about their wedding, while Mona (Janel Parrish) helps Hanna get back into the fashion business by showing Hanna's work to Katherine Daly (Emma Dumont), Senator Daly's daughter. However, Hanna argues with Mona when Katherine assumes that Mona is Hanna's boss. Alison and Emily discuss Alison's jealousy towards Paige. Ultimately, Alison verbally fights with Paige during a school staff reunion, leaving things awkward. While visiting a possible buffet for Aria and Ezra's marriage, Hanna and Aria run into Holden (Shane Coffey), Aria's long-time friend. Aria discovers that he is now a chef, among other skills, and they end up catching up on their lives.

"A.D." delivers an interactive board game which shows notable places of Rosewood and figurines of the Liars. They decide not to play the stalker's game, but Spencer secretly moves forward with the game. Veronica (Lesley Fera) returns home and reveals to Spencer that Peter slept with Mary Drake years ago thinking she was Jessica, resulting in a baby about to grow up in a sanitarium; then, Veronica turned to Judge Kahn — Noel Kahn's father — and adopted the child. Spencer is completely devastated by her mother's revelation and ends up finding solace in a letter written by Mary years ago that is given by "A.D." to Spencer through the game. Later, the Liars discover that Spencer played the game, and Hanna tries to break the board, but is interrupted when a video of them burying Archer's body is played. Meanwhile, somewhere, Jenna is shown in a completely dark room without her glasses, drinking tea. She reminds "A.D." of their intention to tell her about the game and "A.D." hands her a notepad on her lap with braille. Jenna reads the notes on the game and mutters "end game", as she grins in delight.

== Production ==
"Playtime" was written by Allyson N. Nelson and executive producer Joseph Dougherty and directed by cast member Chad Lowe. Nelson announced her work with Dougherty on June 9, 2016. The title of the episode and its director were announced by Dougherty on June 25, 2016. Table-read for the episode started on June 29, 2016. Filming occurred between July 11 and July 19, 2016, in and around Los Angeles, California, mostly on the backlot of the Warner Bros. studio lot in Burbank. Cast member Lesley Fera makes her debut on the season as Veronica Hastings in this episode in a recurring capacity, after last appearing on "Hush... Hush, Sweet Liars," the season finale of the previous season. On July 28, 2016, The Hollywood Reporter reported that Shane Coffey would be returning as Holden Strauss; Shane has not appeared on the show since the beginning of the third season, and returns in this episode. The premiere served to launch Marlene King's new drama Famous in Love, which aired on the following timeslot.

== Reception ==
=== Ratings ===
Following its original broadcast in the United States, "Playtime" was viewed by 2.00 million people and earned a 0.7 rating/share according to the Nielsen Media Research.

=== Reviews ===
Caroline Preece of Den of Geek gave the episode a mixed review, writing, "As we enter these final ten episodes of the crazy, emotional, often transcendent ride that has been this show, we’re at a crossroads. We can approach the end with suspicion and measured expectations, or we can just relax and go along for the ride." She noted, "We’re starting small, but much chaos is promised." Isabella Biedenharn gave the episode an A−, also commenting, "So here we are, at the start of the final season. I’ll be honest, some days I didn’t think we’d ever get here." "With the end in sight, though, I’m happy to finally have some answers on the horizon," she concluded.

Newcomer TVFanatic reviewer Yana Grebenyuk wrote, "the clock is ticking and everyone, especially us, deserves some answers. It's been more than enough time, so I am really hoping we continue to get more of an explanation for pretty much everything instead of new questions being posed to keep us distracted." SpoilerTV Gavin Hetherington wrote for the episode an uplifting review, stating that "[the show is] going to take the final stretch of episodes in a very interesting direction." He also glorified the series' writer's work on Spencer's story line as Mary Drake's daughter.
