= Original G'A'ngsters =

- Pretty Little Liars episode
- Episode no.: Season 7 Episode 7
- Directed by: Melanie Mayron
- Written by: Kateland Brown
- Editing by: Robert Lattanzio
- Original air date: August 9, 2016
- Running time: 42 minutes

Guest appearances
- Keegan Allen as Toby Cavanaugh; Drew Van Acker as Jason DiLaurentis; Brant Daugherty as Noel Kahn; Kara Royster as Yvonne Phillips; Tammin Sursok as Jenna Marshall; Nia Peeples as Pam Fields; Nikki Crawford as Agent Leigh

Episode chronology
← Previous "Wanted: Dead or Alive"	Next → "Exes and OMGs"
- Pretty Little Liars (season 7)

"Original G'A'ngsters" is the seventh episode of the seventh season of the mystery drama television series Pretty Little Liars, which aired on August 9, 2016, on the cable network Freeform. The hundred and forty-seventh episode of the series, it was directed by Melanie Mayron and written by Kateland Brown. The episode received a Nielsen rating of 0.6 and was viewed by 1.16 million viewers, up from the previous episode. It received positive reviews from critics.

The series focuses on a group of five women, collectively known as Liars, who receive anonymous messages in the form of threats from an unknown person, while they struggle to survive a life with danger. In this episode, the city of Rosewood is shocked by Sara Harvey's death, while the Liars must struggle with their own problems. Jason DiLaurentis comes back to Rosewood, and is fearful on Mary Drake's intentions. A new evidence about Mary and Jessica's past at the Radley Sanitarium is discovered, and it changes everything. Meanwhile, Noel Kahn's behaviour starts to worry the Liars. Ezra and Aria decide to elope in Italy, but right before they are about to leave, the FBI contacts Ezra and tells him Nicole might be alive.

== Plot ==
Spencer (Troian Bellisario) presents the girls with necklaces symbolizing their friendship. Upon receiving the bill, Alison (Sasha Pieterse) reads a message that A.D. wrote inside the bill, revealing that A.D. knows that they killed Elliott. Some police officers appear in the Radley, and the girls think that they are there for them. However, Emily (Shay Mitchell) discovers then that the cops are there because of Sara Harvey's murder, who was killed in Jenna's hotel room. The girls complain about the false cries of Jenna (Tammin Sursok), stating that she was pretending to like Sara. While Sara's dead body is carried on a stretcher, her hand accidentally escapes the sheet and the girls are scared by the state of her hand.

Later, Emily and her mother, Pam (Nia Peeples), are running and exercising through the city forest and Emily decides to take her to celebrate her birthday in the Radley. Spencer talks to Toby (Keegan Allen), questioning why Jenna returned to Rosewood. In a flashback, Jenna and Toby are in a summerhouse on New Year's Eve, and Jenna says she can not see some things in her mind, such as the face of Toby. He then lets Jenna touch his face in order to make her remember how it is, but Jenna ends up wanting to kiss him, but Toby pulls away and leaves. Back in the present, Toby says to Spencer that Jenna left the summer house the next day. Then, through Toby's communication radio, they discover that someone broke into Toby's house. He then leaves running and Spencer is disconcerted.

In the DiLaurentis house, Mary (Andrea Parker) and Alison discovers that Jason (Drew Van Acker) returned to Rosewood, but Jason soon expels Mary out of the residence, stating that Alison's health is under his care. Following, Alison argues with Jason, and asks him to take a chance to meet Mary. Anyway, Jason is still certain that Mary has bad intentions. Ezra (Ian Harding) is abuzz with the preparations of his wedding with Aria (Lucy Hale), and he then decides to elope to Tuscany, but Aria isn't okay. Hanna (Ashley Benson) invades Jenna's room in Radley in order to find clues about A.D. when Caleb (Tyler Blackburn) enters the room and warns that he is working as technology security at the hotel. He says he will help Hanna to find something against Jenna, and she accepts. Aria accepts Ezra's offer to elope, and they plan to travel the next day. Aria then receives a message from Jason, asking her to meet up with him.

At the Brew, Aria reveals to Jason that she's engaged to Ezra and asks him if he had told anyone about what happened to them, and Jason denies. Aria also says she did not tell anyone, and Jason says he will keep secret. Changing the subject, Jason enlists Aria's help to make Alison see who Mary really is. Jason then reveals that Elliott completely diverted the Carissimi Group's money. Back at the Radley, Caleb is disguised as a masseuse in order to find what's inside Jenna's bag, which turns out to be the key to open the mysterious box under Jenna's bed in her room. Caleb delivers the key to Spencer and Hanna, and the two go to Jenna's room to find out what's inside the box. They find several papers; then, someone slowly opens the door and starts to come in, and the girls quickly hide under the bed. The person hides Mary Drake's old Radley Sanitarium file inside the box and is revealed to be Noel Kahn (Brant Daugherty). Yet under the bed, Spencer and Hanna see him calling Dr. Cochrane, saying he is impatient and out of time.

At night, Emily and Pam get together for dinner and to celebrate Pam's birthday. They talk about Wayne, the late father of Emily and Pam's husband. Their dinner is disturbed when a group of women arrive at Radley shouting, singing and having fun. Caleb and Hanna begin working on papers found inside the mysterious box of Jenna, and Caleb ends up seeing that Hanna is not wearing the engagement ring on her left hand and eventually causes tension between the two. During the DiLaurentis' dinner, Mary offers wine to Jason, but he denies, since he doesn't ingest alcoholic beverages. A tense atmosphere is formed in the living room, but Jason reveals that he invited a friend—Aria.

At the hospital, Spencer tells Toby that he should leave Rosewood with Yvonne (Kara Royster) and build a house for her away from the disturbing city. Pam and Emily receive two drinks ordered by the brides-to-be as a peace offer, and Pam decides to join them. Meanwhile, Jason argues with Alison, saying Mary's not a good person, not even a way to replace their mother, Jessica. Then, Mary tells them about the day she saw Jason . In a flashback, Jason appears in Carol Ward's house, and Jessica (Andrea Parker) quickly dispatches him. Through the window, Mary sees him and is crying. Jessica complains about Mary being there, and Mary says she is worried about what really happened to her then deceased child—Charles—, but Jessica expels her. Back in the present, Mary says that, when Jessica decided that a conversation was over, it was over. Mary then talks about a storm cellar of Carol Ward's house, and Alison and Aria grow suspicious.

Aria tells Emily about the cellar and she and the others decided to visit the cellar in order to find answers. Emily asks to visit the shelter the next day, but Aria says she can not because she will elope with Ezra. Emily is happy that Aria will marry Ezra. Hanna tells Caleb about the end of her engagement, and she asks him if they are still friends, and Caleb says that they are.

Toby visits Spencer's loft and he says that he was building the house for her, not for Yvonne. However, he revealed that he could not imagine his life without Yvonne, and then he says that they will move to Maine, where Yvonne has family. They say goodbye, and Spencer cries against the door. Alison, Emily, Spencer and Hanna arrives at Carol Ward's house and they found the hidden cellar. Inside, the four discover that Jessica was investigating their lives and Alison's disappearance. Jessica also kept files of each one of the girls, except Aria. Within a Mary Drake file, Spencer discovers that Jessica was in charge of Mary's mental health and that she had authorized electroshock therapy. In another file, Emily discovers that Mary had a second child while she was hospitalized in the Radley, and that this child would have the same age of them. They then begin to think that this child — cousin of Alison — may be behind A.D. mask, and be wanting revenge for something.

Aria and Ezra are preparing for the trip to Tuscany, when an FBI agent (Nikki Crawford) appears in the apartment, saying that Nicole, Ezra's deceased ex-girlfriend, may be alive. The girls walks away from the cellar when Spencer's car began to emit a deafening sound. They get into the car in order to stop the noise, but they end up getting trapped inside the vehicle. A countdown starts in the car's computer screen, and they think the car will explode. However, a message appears on the computer screen, startling them. The storm cellar then explodes, and someone writes "I see you" on the rear window of the car.

Meanwhile, somewhere, someone is with Aria's and Noel's file that was in the cellar. This person then burns up Noel's file.

== Production ==
The episode was written by Kateland Brown and directed by Melanie Mayron. On May 28, 2016, the actress Nia Peeples revealed the episode's title, writer and director, also announcing that she would be returning to the series with her role of Pam Fields. Cast members Keegan Allen, Brant Daugherty, Kara Royster and Tammin Sursok guest star as the roles of Toby Cavanaugh, Noel Kahn, Yvonne Phillips and Jenna Marshall, respectively. The actor Drew Van Acker returns for the seventh season for his role of Jason DiLaurentis and first appearance in this episode.

== Reception ==
=== Ratings ===
In the U.S., "Original G'A'ngsters" was aired on August 9, 2016 to a viewership of 1.16 million, up from the previous episode. It garnered a 0.6 rating among adults aged 18–49, according to Nielsen Media Research. After Live +3 DVR ratings, the episode had the biggest gain in Adults 18-49, finishing with a 1.1 rating among adults aged 18–49, and aired to a total viewership of 2.11 million, placing in the fifth spot in viewership.

=== Critical response ===
Paul Dailly, from TV Fanatic, gave the episode 4 out of 5 stars and wrote a mixed review, saying, "So many questions and so little answers. You'd think Pretty Little Liars was renewed for another four seasons with the amount of questions that pop up." Also, he added, "'Original G'A'ngsters' was another solid episode of this Freeform drama. It's time to start giving us all of the answers now." For SpoilerTV, Gavin Hetherington wrote for the episode a mixed to positive review, stating, "The seventh episode in Pretty Little Liars' seventh season proved to be a worthy hour for the show, with minor plot progression for some of the characters, much needed reunions and flashbacks galore. A couple of shady moments thrown in and we have a typical episode of our favourite Freeform show." Jessica Goldstein of Vulture gave the episode three out of 5 stars.
