= Wanted: Dead or Alive (Pretty Little Liars) =

- Pretty Little Liars episode
- Episode no.: Season 7 Episode 6
- Directed by: Bethany Rooney
- Written by: Lijah J. Barasz
- Editing by: Melissa Gearhart
- Original air date: August 2, 2016
- Running time: 42 minutes

Guest appearances
- Vanessa Ray as CeCe Drake/Charlotte DiLaurentis; Huw Collins as Elliott Rollins/Archer Dunhill; Dre Davis as Sara Harvey; Nicholas Gonzalez as Det. Marco Furey; Tammin Sursok as Jenna Marshall; Dawn Brodey as the maid

Episode chronology
← Previous "Along Comes Mary"	Next → "Original G'A'ngsters"
- Pretty Little Liars season 7

"Wanted: Dead or Alive" is the sixth episode of the seventh season of the mystery drama television series Pretty Little Liars, which aired on August 2, 2016, on the cable network Freeform. The hundred and forty-sixth episode on the series, it was directed by Bethany Rooney and written by Lijah J. Barasz. The episode received a Nielsen rating of 0.5 and was viewed by 1.10 million viewers. It received mixed reviews from critics.

The series focuses on a group of five women, collectively known as Liars, who receive anonymous messages in the form of threats from an unknown person, while they struggle to survive a life with danger. In this episode, the Rosewood P.D. is getting closer to finding out what really happened to Elliott Rollins, while the Liars work together to discover who was Rollins' partner in crime. Aria (Lucy Hale) and Ezra (Ian Harding) must deal with their awkward relationship. Spencer (Troian Bellisario) and Caleb (Tyler Blackburn) move on, while Hanna (Ashley Benson) finally reveals that she's not engaged anymore. Someone is murdered inside the Radley Hotel for playing in the wrong team.

== Plot ==
The morning after the previous episode, the Liars reunite at the Brew to talk about who could possibly be behind "A.D."'s mask, when Alison (Sasha Pieterse) suddenly appears wearing the jacket they previously gave up to "A.D." in order to make Alison look guilty of Charlotte's murder. Spencer and Alison leave the Brew, and Spencer convinces Alison that they only delivered the jacket to "A.D." because they thought she was responsible for Charlotte's murder, and Spencer decides to join Alison and Mary at the DiLaurentis' house, since Det. Marco Furey is there, wanting to give some answers. Aria (Lucy Hale) sees Ezra (Ian Harding), and they feel uncomfortable after Aria "refused" Ezra's proposal of marriage. Marco Furey (Nicholas Gonzalez) reveals his theory that Archer Dunhill is closer than imaginable, and also says that Alison is in danger. Spencer talks with Furey in order to make things clear regarding the kiss they had in the Radley elevator. Hanna (Ashley Benson) finds Elliott's burner phone ringing, and, when she answers, a British voice delivers a message, scaring Hanna, thinking it is Elliott's. Aria assures Hanna that Elliott could not possibly have survived, and that A.D. is calling her using his voice. Emily speaks with Ezra about Aria, and afterward she sees Sara (Dre Davis) with a present entering the Radley's elevator.

In the Lost Woods Resort, Spencer tries to break into the building, but is surprised when Mary (Andrea Parker) shows up with a crowbar, thinking that she was Elliott trying to kill her. They talk about Elliott/Archer. Aria reveals to Hanna that Ezra proposed marriage, as Hanna throws away her fake engagement ring, revealing to Aria that she and Jordan are no longer engaged. Meanwhile, inside a police car, someone is watching the two. Caleb (Tyler Blackburn) talks with Ezra about his former relationship with Spencer.

Back at the Radley, Emily arrives at Jenna's room in order to deliver two drinks. Emily peeks into Jenna's laptop, but is stopped by Sara, who screams at her. Emily reveals to the two that someone is stalking her and her friends, after which Jenna (Tammin Sursok) tells Emily a story of when Charlotte was still a patient at the psychiatric hospital. In the flash back, Charlotte enlists Jenna's help to find her birth mother and make Archer Dunhill the alias of Elliott Rollins in order to purposely meet Alison and take advantage of her good intentions for her eventual release. Jenna then reveals she's angry because of Charlotte's death. Emily leaves the room, but before she does, Sara warns Emily, trying to say that someone is dangerous. However, she is interrupted before saying who is in danger, when Jenna calls her.

Spencer and Caleb finally have a conversation about their awkward relationship. Spencer tells him that, for a long time, her heart was frozen, but when she started seeing him, her heart could feel love and pain again. Later, they say goodbye to each other. Alison reveals to Mary that Charlotte previously used the alias of CeCe Drake, and Mary gets emotional. Aria tells Ezra everything that happened the night Elliott was killed. Emily tells Alison about what Jenna revealed to her, and Alison gets angry. Spencer and Hanna talk sitting on the swings while drinking beer. Hanna tells Spencer about the dream she had with her while she was being held captive by "A.D." Elliott's burner phone start ringing, and, when Hanna answers, his voice says that Alison is in danger. Meanwhile, in the DiLaurentis' house, Alison receives Hanna's call warning her about the danger; after, Alison invites the cop who is securing her house to enter. However, when she goes to her room, the officer, who is actually "A.D" with a mask, attacks her. During the struggle, Alison rips off part of the mask, claiming that she saw Elliott, but A.D. retreats when the police's siren is heard. After hearing everything from Aria, Ezra proposes to Aria again and, this time, she says yes. Emily comforts Alison after the confusion faded.

Sara gets her bags to flee, but is interrupted by someone. Spencer and Hanna return to the place where they buried Elliott, and, after digging, they discover that he is really dead. A maid (Dawn Brodey) arrives at Sara's room in order to clean the place, when she finds Sara dead inside the bathtub.

The episode ends with "A.D." watching a tape of Spencer and Hanna replacing the soil where Elliott's body was buried.

== Production ==
The episode was directed by Bethany Rooney and written by Lijah J. Barasz. Filming for the episode occurred during May 2016.

== Reception ==
=== Ratings ===
In the U.S., "Wanted: Dead or Alive" was aired on August 2, 2016 to a viewership of 1.10 million Americans, down from the previous episode. It garnered a 0.5 rating among adults aged 18–49, according to Nielsen Media Research. After Live +3 DVR ratings, the episode tied for the eighth spot in Adults 18-49, finishing with a 1.0 rating among adults aged 18–49, and aired to a total viewership of 1.94 million, placing in the twelfth spot in viewership.

=== Critical response ===
Writing for TVEquals, Mark Trammell gave the episode a favorable review, saying: "All in all, a decent enough episode, with lots of shipper bait and a major death that I think most of us saw coming a mile away. Still, at least they’re taking people out for once- that’s three already and the season’s not even half over! I don’t know about you, but I’ll take it."

Paul Dailly, from TV Fanatic, gave the episode 3.8 out of 5 stars, stating that the episode "was an exciting installment of this Freeform drama. The stage is set for what is sure to be an exciting conclusion to the summer run, but we're probably going to lose some more characters along the way."

Writing for SpoilerTV, Gavin Hetherington praised the whole episode, commenting: "One of the better episodes in 7A, with a handful of scenes that really stood out. The death was great, because I really wanted it to happen for like the longest time, and some of the characters had better material than the last episode (looking at you Spencer)." Jessica Goldstein of Vulture gave the episode three out of 5 stars.
