= Lulu Brud =

American actress and interior designer

- Born: High Point, North Carolina, U.S.
- Occupations: Actress, interior designer, producer, writer
- Years active: 2006–present
- Spouse: Justin Zsebe (m. 2013)
- Children: 2

Lulu Brud (born 1985) is an American actress and interior designer, best known for her role as Sabrina in Pretty Little Liars.

== Career ==
Brud is an actress and interior designer.

== Selected television ==
- 90210 new generation (2010)
- Pretty Little Liars (2015–2017)
- Ray Donovan (2018)

== Private life ==
Her best friend since high school is Troian Bellisario.

Brud married in November 2013.
