= Brant Daugherty =

American actor

- Born: Brant David Daugherty; August 20, 1985 (age 41); Mason, Ohio, U.S.
- Occupation: Actor
- Years active: 2008–present
- Spouse: Kimberly Hidalgo (m. 2019)
- Children: 2

Brant David Daugherty (born August 20, 1985) is an American actor, known for his recurring role as Noel Kahn on the teen drama television series Pretty Little Liars. In 2013, he had a recurring role as Brian in the NBC daytime drama Days of Our Lives.

== Early life ==
Daugherty was born and raised in Mason, Ohio, the son of David Daugherty, an art teacher at Mason Middle School, and his wife, Mary Beth (née Hirt) Daugherty, head of rehabilitation services for Shriners Hospitals for Children, Cincinnati. Brant's father died of cancer on February 19, 2009, at age 57.

Daugherty attended William Mason High School, where he played football until his sophomore year and later tried out for the school play. He continued to perform in school plays until his graduation in 2004. He moved to Los Angeles in 2008 after earning a film degree from Columbia College Chicago. He now resides in West Hollywood.

== Career ==
In 2013, he was a regular of the cast of Lifetime Network's Army Wives for season 7, which began airing in April 2013, in the role of Patrick Clarke.

He had a credited role in Jason Friedberg and Aaron Seltzer's motion picture comedy film The Starving Games released in fall 2013.

In 2014, he had a credited role in the Charlie Sheen FX series Anger Management.

Daugherty was a contestant in season 17 of Dancing with the Stars in which he partnered with professional dancer Peta Murgatroyd. They were eliminated in the eighth week of competition, finishing in seventh place.

In 2018, he played Luke Sawyer in the film Fifty Shades Freed.

== Personal life ==
Daugherty started dating actress Kimberly Hidalgo in 2016. They got engaged in February 2018 during a trip to Amsterdam and they married on June 15, 2019. They have two sons together: Wilder, born in March 2021, and Aero, born December 2023. He, his wife, and their children gained Italian citizenship in 2024.

== Filmography ==
=== Film ===
| Year | Title | Role | Notes |
|---|---|---|---|
| 2008 | Suspended | Bill | Short film |
| 2013 | The Starving Games | Dale | |
| 2013 | Something Wicked | Aiden | Short film |
| 2015 | Merry Kissmas | Dustin Casey | |
| 2016 | Oranges | Danny Foster | |
| 2017 | Broken Strings | Agent | Short film |
| 2018 | Fifty Shades Freed | Luke Sawyer | |
| 2018 | Another Tango | Dean Rogers | |
| 2019 | Timeless Love | Thomas Clayborne | Hallmark Movie |
| 2021 | Just For The Summer | Jason | |
| 2022 | A Royal Runaway Romance | Grady Beck | Hallmark Movie |
| 2022 | #Xmas | Max | Hallmark Movie |
| 2023 | Joyeux Noel | Mark | Hallmark Movie |
| 2024 | Trivia at St. Nick's | Max | Hallmark Movie |
| 2026 | By the Roots | James | |

=== Television ===
| Year | Title | Role | Notes |
|---|---|---|---|
| 2010 | Super Sportlets | Ben / Ballistico | Main role; 27 episodes |
| 2010–2016 | Pretty Little Liars | Noel Kahn | Recurring role; 27 episodes |
| 2012–2013 | Days of Our Lives | Brian | Recurring role; 14 episodes |
| 2013 | Army Wives | Lt. Patrick Clarke | Recurring role; 9 episodes |
| 2013 | Dancing with the Stars | Himself | Contestant |
| 2014 | Anger Management | Tiffer | Episode: "Charlie Pledges a Sorority Sister" |
| 2014 | The Michaels | Tom Stanfield | Television film |
| 2015 | Ungodly Acts | Daniel | Television film |
| 2015 | Merry Kissmas | Dustin Casey | Television Film |
| 2016 | Suicide Note | Brady Faris | Television film |
| 2016 | Accidentally Engaged | Chas Hunter | Television film |
| 2017 | Dear White People | Thane Lockwood | Recurring role; 3 episodes |
| 2017 | Freakish | Jake | Recurring role |
| 2018 | Mingle All the Way | Jeff Scanlon | Hallmark Channel Television film |
| 2019 | Lost Star | Peter Ski | Main role |
| 2019 | A Christmas Movie Christmas | Paul | UP TV television film |
| 2020 | Just for the Summer | Jason Humphrey | UP TV television film |
| 2021 | The Baker's Son | Matt | Hallmark TV television film |
| 2022 | The Nature of Romance | Sean Davis | Television film |

=== Web ===
| Year | Title | Role | Notes |
|---|---|---|---|
| 2009 | Private | Thomas Pearson | 10 episodes |
| 2009 | Private: The Casting Call | Himself | Episode 1 |
| 2012 | Pretty Dirty Secrets | Noel Kahn | Episode: "I'm a Free Man" |
| 2016–2017 | Relationship Status | Church | 6 episodes |
