= These Boots Were Made for Stalking =

- Pretty Little Liars episode
- Episode no.: Season 7 Episode 12
- Directed by: Ron Lagomarsino
- Written by: Oliver Goldstick
- Editing by: Craig Fikse
- Original air date: April 25, 2017
- Running time: 42 minutes

Guest appearances
- Lesley Fera as Veronica Hastings; Lindsey Shaw as Paige McCullers; Shane Coffey as Holden Strauss; Nicholas Gonzalez as Det. Marco Furey; Ava Allan as Addison Derringer; Tammin Sursok as Jenna Marshall; Chris Gardner as Gerald Healy; Algerita Wynn as the nurse

Episode chronology
| ← Previous "Playtime" | Next → "Hold Your Piece" |
- Pretty Little Liars (season 7)

"These Boots Were Made for Stalking" is the twelfth episode of the seventh season of the American mystery drama television series Pretty Little Liars, which aired on April 25, 2017, on the cable network Freeform. The 152nd episode overall, it was directed by Ron Lagomarsino and written by Oliver Goldstick. "These Boots Were Made for Stalking" received a Nielsen rating of 0.5 and was viewed by 0.91 million viewers, a decrease from the previous episode, although received favorable response.

The series focuses on a group of five women, collectively known as the Liars, whose receive anonymous messages in form of threats from an unknown person, while they struggle to survive a life with danger. In this episode, each of the Liars struggle with their personal lives, while the Liar's Lament board game starts to give them clues to the endgame.

== Plot ==
After Hanna's (Ashley Benson) unsuccessful attempt to break the Liar's Lament board game, the Liars debate if the board can or can not see them. Alison (Sasha Pieterse) insists that Jenna (Tammin Sursok) may be behind "A.D.'s" mask, to which Hanna disagrees. Aria (Lucy Hale) is suspicious towards Sydney, but Emily (Shay Mitchell) refuses the theory. Instead, she says they should surrender to the police, revealing they killed Archer. Spencer (Troian Bellisario) rebut it, stating they broke laws, even if Archer's death wasn't a first degree murder. Spencer asks Marco (Nicholas Gonzalez) to track down Mary Drake and shows him the letter Mary wrote for her. At the Police Station, Jenna suddenly appears, and tells Marco and Spencer that she was trying to protect herself from Noel the night she was holding a gun at the school for the blind, and now she has been hiding since. Jenna further tells them that Noel wanted money from Jenna, which Charlotte gave her for her eye surgery, and that he is Sara's killer, which Spencer is skeptical of. Mona (Janel Parrish) reveals to Hanna that Katherine fell in love with a dress that was in Hanna's closet, and Hanna ends up denying the possibility of selling it to Katherine. Later, on at Radley, Hanna sees Jenna wearing a white version of the dress and is enraged; Mona confronts Jenna, but the latter does not say where she got it. Hanna joins Caleb (Tyler Blackburn) and follows Jenna to an atelier of an acquaintance of Hanna. Caleb argues with Jenna on the sidewalk while Hanna invades the studio and ends up being jailed up by someone unknown. While there, flashbacks from the time she was abducted pop up in Hanna's mind, driving her insane. Caleb arrives in time to rescue her.

In the girls' personal lives, Aria is afraid that Ezra's reconnection with Nicole might lead to their marriage not happening, and finds solace with friend Holden (Shane Coffey). Emily is accused by high school student Addison Derringer (Ava Allan) of being inappropriate, while Addison gathers photos of Emily with Alison (Sasha Pieterse). Paige (Lindsey Shaw) tries to resolve the situation, but Emily ends up screaming at Addison. Ultimately, Paige calls Addison's father and she's called to the Principal's room. Spencer requires her father's presence at home, and ends up arguing once again with her mother (Lesley Fera) about Mary Drake.

Emily decides to play the game and, following the triumph of the mission delivered to her, she wins a piece of the board puzzle. Spencer understands that through the junction of the pieces, a map that will lead to something or someone will be revealed.

== Production ==
"These Boots Were Made for Stalking" was directed by Ron Lagomarsino and written by Oliver Goldstick. Table-read for this episode started on July 15, 2016, while filming occurred between July 20 and July 27, 2016.

=== Casting ===
All ensemble cast members return for this episode. Lesley Fera, Lindsey Shaw, Nicholas Gonzalez and Tammin Sursok portray in a recurring capacity characters Veronica Hastings, Paige McCullers, Detective Marco Furey and Jenna Marshall, respectively. Shane Coffey portrays Holden Strauss for the second time on Season 7. Ava Allan debuts in the series portraying teenager Addison Derringer in a recurring capacity.

=== Title reference ===
The episode's previous title was revealed by showrunner I. Marlene King on July 15, 2016. It references the book These Boots Are Made For Stalking by author Lisi Harrison, included in the book series The Clique, which contains a similar theme of the Pretty Little Liars book series. The title could also regard the 1966 song "These Boots Are Made for Walkin'" by singer Nancy Sinatra.

Later, it was retitled as "These Boots Were Made for Stalking", replacing the verb "are" for its past form.

== Critical reception ==
Writing for SpoilerTV, Gavin Hetherington gave the episode a mixed review, "I like the game and it's providing the show with its final injection of life, but pretty much everything else around it is not as interesting." He further added saying the Liars' personal lives story line are "too tedious." "All in all, it was a fine episode, but with only 8 episodes to go, we need more than fine," he concluded. Paul Dailly from TVFanatic gave the episode a 4 out of 5 stars rating, said it "was a solid episode that raised the stakes some more as we approach the finish line. I was so on the fence about the Jumanji-like game at first, but I'm interested in finding out who it leads to."

== Broadcast and ratings ==
Following its original airing, "These Boots Were Made for Stalking " was watched by 0.91 million Americans and earned a 0.5 rating/share according to the Nielsen Media Research.
