= Power Play (Pretty Little Liars) =

- Pretty Little Liars episode
- Hanna talking to Pastor Ted about Charlotte.
- Episode no.: Season 7 Episode 14
- Directed by: Roger Kumble
- Written by: Lijah Barasz
- Original air date: May 9, 2017
- Running time: 41 minutes

Guest appearances
- Lindsey Shaw as Paige McCullers; Nolan North as Peter Hastings; Nicholas Gonzalez as Det. Marco Furey; Chloe Bridges as Sydney Driscoll; Ed Kerr as Ted Wilson

Episode chronology
← Previous "Hold Your Piece"	Next → "In the Eye Abides the Heart"
- Pretty Little Liars (season 7)

"Power Play" is the fourteenth episode of the seventh season of the television series Pretty Little Liars, which was originally aired on May 9, 2017, on the cable network Freeform. The installment was directed by Roger Kumble and written by Lijah J. Barasz. It received a Nielsen rating of 0.5 and was viewed by 0.91 million viewers, up from the previous episode.

== Plot ==
Alison’s (Sasha Pieterse) turn at the game forces her to make a drastic decision to abort her child but is haunted when "A.D." reminds her of when she was in the psychiatric hospital and was wheeled into an operating room. Alison is traumatized to remember that Emily's (Shay Mitchell) donated eggs were implanted inside her uterus, realizing Emily is her child's mother. Spencer (Troian Bellisario) has a long overdue conversation with her father (Nolan North) about his past sins and recent whereabouts. Emily continues to navigate working at Rosewood High with both Alison and Paige (Lindsey Shaw), learning the truth about Alison's pregnancy. Meanwhile, Paige contemplates leaving Rosewood, but decides against it, resulting in her and Emily renewing their relationship. Aria (Lucy Hale) continues to question the fate of her relationship with Ezra (Ian Harding) after Nicole's arrival and bristles under "A.D.’s" taunts. While searching for Mary (Andrea Parker), wanting answers from her, Hanna (Ashley Benson) and Spencer run into Pastor Ted (Ed Kerr), who eventually reveals himself as Charlotte's biological father. He also reveals that Lucas was Charlotte's old childhood friend. Meanwhile, Aria discovers that Sydney (Chloe Bridges) is on the A-Team, working for "A.D." and she offers Aria the chance to join the team, and become one of "A.D.'s" minions.

== Production ==
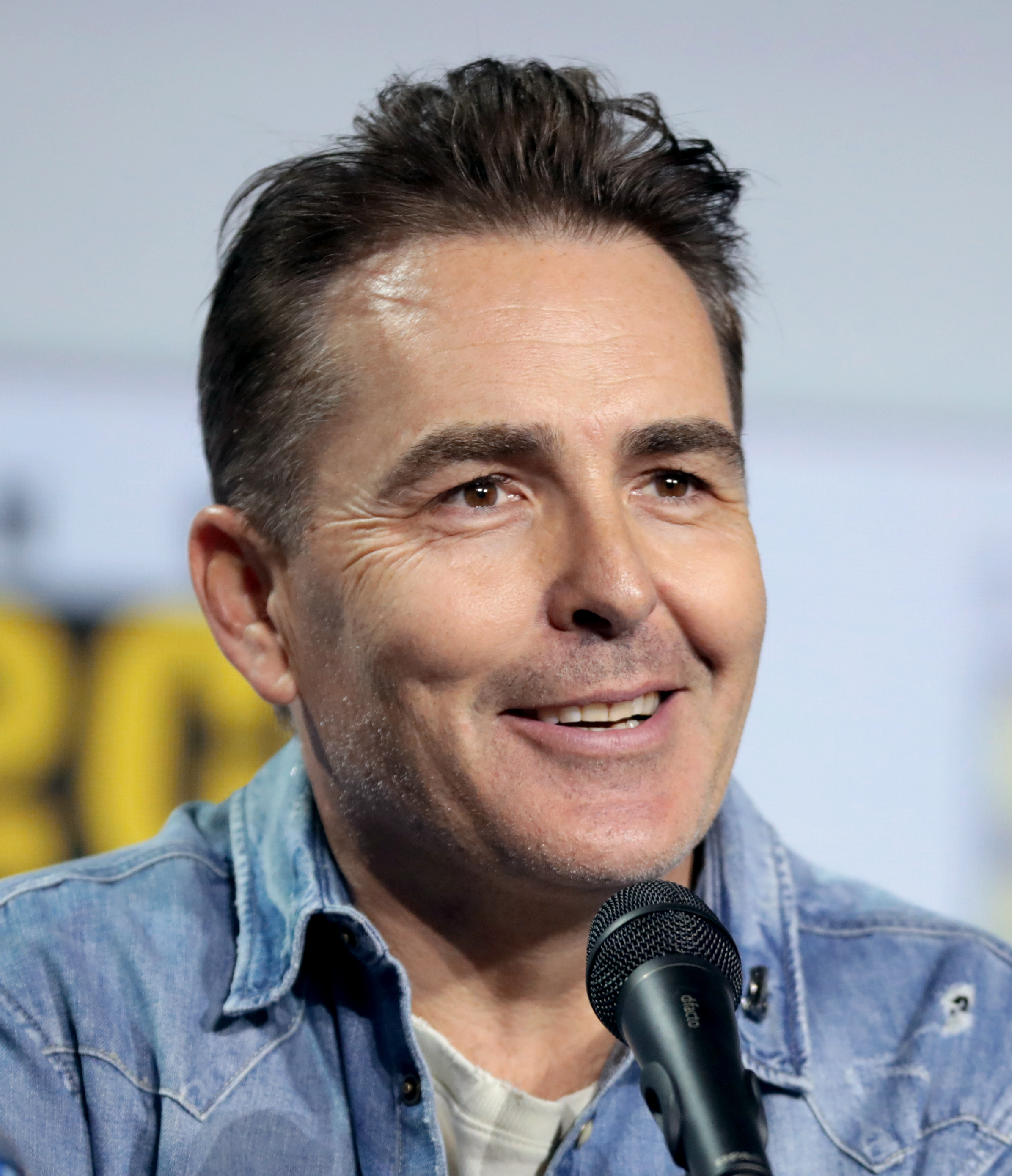
Nolan North plays Peter Hastings for the first time during the seventh season in this episode.

"Power Play" was directed by Roger Kumble and written by Lijah J. Barasz, her last writing on the series. The title was revealed by showrunner I. Marlene King via Twitter on August 3, 2016. Table-read for the episode occurred on August 3, 2016, while filming took place between August 5 and August 15, 2016.

== Reception ==
=== Ratings ===
"Power Play" premiered to an audience of 0.91 million Americans, acquiring a 0.5 rating/share in the 18–49 demographic, according to Nielsen Media Research.

=== Reviews ===
"Power Play" was met with glorification from fans and with mixed opinions from television criticism. Writing for SpoilerTV, Gavin Hetherington acclaimed the episode, saying, "The many developments in this episode alone has catapulted the show into its final stretch - Aria potentially joining A.D., Jessica's killer finally revealed, the baby belonging to Emily, Spencer getting closer to the truth about Mary Drake, potential shade with Lucas - how can these not make you even more excited about the final 6 episodes. I'll say it again, this is the episode I was waiting for. It's made me excited all over again just to see what will happen next, and it's about time. No more beating around the bush, no more hoping for something to happen - it's going to happen! We are getting answers and some fresh drama when I thought the pulse was slowly starting to die." Paul Dailly from TV Fanatic said the episode "was the jolt of life the series needed," commenting that "[the episode] was great. It was a shocking episode that gave us some much-needed reveals." In addition to praising costume and episode references, Rebecca Kurson from the Observer commented: "The show has just two more episodes to add back some fantastic styles with the increasingly knotted plot." Lauren Busser from Tell-Tale TV website gave the episode a 3.5 out of 5 stars rating. Eliza Thompson from Cosmopolitan wrote, "Plot-wise, Pretty Little Liars is one of the crazier shows on TV, but even by PLL standards, Tuesday's episode "Power Play" was bananas. I gasped so many times that I'm offended my neighbors didn't check to see if I was suffocating, and that was before I started yelling "WHAT?!" at the screen. If you were worried that I. Marlene King and company were going to drop the ball and leave some mysteries unsolved, you should be able to rest a little easier, because "Power Play" set the record straight on a number of important topics." Fans of the series received the plot of the episode and its development very well, praising the several revelations depicted in it.
