= Along Comes Mary (Pretty Little Liars) =

- Pretty Little Liars episode
- Episode no.: Season 7 Episode 5
- Directed by: Norman Buckley
- Written by: Bryan M. Holdman
- Editing by: Jill D'Agnenica
- Original air date: July 19, 2016

Guest appearances
- Keegan Allen as Toby Cavanaugh; Brant Daugherty as Noel Kahn; Dre Davis as Sara Harvey; Lulu Brud as Sabrina; Nicholas Gonzalez as Marco Furey; Tammin Sursok as Jenna Marshall; Christine Avila as Paulette

Episode chronology
← Previous "Hit and Run, Run, Run"	Next → "Wanted: Dead or Alive"
- Pretty Little Liars season 7

"Along Comes Mary" is the fifth episode of the seventh season of the American mystery drama television series Pretty Little Liars, which aired on July 16, 2016, on the cable network Freeform. The hundred and forty-fifth episode on the series, it was directed by Norman Buckley and written by Bryan M. Holdman. The episode received a Nielsen rating of 0.6 and was viewed by 1.17 million viewers. It received mixed to positive reviews from critics.

The series focuses on a group of five women, collectively known as Liars, whose receive anonymous messages in form of threats from an unknown person, while they struggle to survive a life with danger. In this episode, the girls come together to find out who is the partner of the deceased Elliott Rollins — or Archer Dunhill. Aria (Lucy Hale) and Ezra's (Ian Harding) relationship takes a new step, and the same happens with Emily (Shay Mitchell) and Sabrina (Lulu Brud). Meanwhile, Spencer (Troian Bellisario) teams up with Hanna (Ashley Benson) to find out where Caleb is, and Jenna (Tammin Sursok) befriends Sara (Dre Davis), putting them on the top of the list of suspects. An old inhabitant returns to Rosewood.

== Plot summary ==
Alison (Sasha Pieterse) comes home and meets Aria (Lucy Hale) waiting in her garden. Aria learns that Mary (Andrea Parker) is Alison's supervisor while she is not on the care of the psychiatric hospital. Inside the house, Mary reveals that Elliott contacted her when she was London, and he reported that Charlotte had been murdered. When confronted by Alison for letting Elliott torture her, Mary says she was vulnerable, but she did not know his real intentions. Emily (Shay Mitchell) wakes up after a night of conversation with Sabrina (Lulu Brud), and ends up realizing that she's delayed for a test. Ezra (Ian Harding) returns after a trip, and reveals to Aria that he visited the parents of the deceased Nicole in New York, and he alleges that they're happy to see Ezra moving on. Emily loses the opportunity to take the exam.

Hanna (Ashley Benson) and Spencer discovers that the police found out Elliott's car. The girls learn that Elliott knew that Alison didn't killed Charlotte, and that he was taking Alison to somewhere else in the night he was run over. Emily, Aria and Alison discuss on a burner apartment that Elliott had; then, Alison discovers that all her money is gone. Aria finds Ezra's cellphone ringing, and she answers a call from Nicole. Across the line, a Jamaican music is playing, insinuating that someone is with Nicole's cell. Aria decides to delete the call from the log. While preparing a type of drink, Emily receives a message, which states that she scored 92% in the exam. Sequentially, a message from "A.D." is received, revealing that he took the exam for Emily. Spencer reveals to Hanna that Caleb is missing, and Hanna gives her some hints of where he could possibly be. They found out that Jenna is still in town.

Emily contacts the mysterious person who was helping Elliott through his burner phone, and she and Aria drives to Elliott's secret apartment. Alison tells Mary that all her money is gone, and Mary is shocked. Spencer visits Toby (Keegan Allen) in the police department in order to find out something about Caleb's disappearance. Toby says Caleb needs some time alone. When Spencer is about to leave the room, she ends up bumping into Det. Marco Furey (Nicholas Gonzalez), who she kissed two nights before. Spencer quickly pretends to not know him, and leaves the room. Jenna (Tammin Sursok) knocks into Alison's door, and the two end up having a discussion about Archer — Elliott's real name.

In the secret apartment, Aria and Emily find a mess that had been used to cover up Elliott's traces. The two discover that Archer's surname is Dunhill, and connect directly to the acronym "A.D." They also found a fake head, several pictures of Darren Wilden's physical characteristics, passports, and a notebook with different types of payments. Jenna befriends Sara Harvey (Dre Davis). Hanna tells Spencer that she used her mother's password in the Radley's database, and that she found out that Jenna extended her stay at the hotel. Emily and Aria get scared when someone tries to enter the apartment; however, they open the door when discover that is Toby. He says the police found out about the apartment in a document found in Elliott's car. Toby commands the girls to leave, and gets angry when he discovers that they have left fingerprints in some objects. Alison visits Det. Furey in the police department, and he ensures that he'll capture Elliott, whatever the cost. Emily and Sabrina mark a new encounter on Saturday. Sara and Jenna talk with Emily, as Sara reveals that she knows about Emily's acceptance in Hollis College.

In a meeting, Hanna freaks out when realizing that somebody knows about what she did, and Aria ends up infuriating Alison when she leaves to see Ezra. Later, Alison discovers through a message from "A.D." that the girls gave her up as Charlotte's killer in order to free Hanna. Meanwhile, Ezra proposes to Aria.

The episode ends with Noel Kahn (Brant Daugherty) meeting with Sara and Jenna.

== Production ==
"Along Comes Mary" was directed by Norman Buckley and written by Bryan M. Holdman. It was read-through on May 11, 2016, and filmed between May 17 and May 25, 2016. Recurring cast members Keegan Allen, Lulu Brud, Nicholas Gonzalez and Tammin Sursok appear reprising their respective roles as Toby Cavanaugh, Sabrina, Marco Furey, and Jenna Marshall. Absent from the series since the fifth season, Brant Daugherty returns as Noel Kahn; his comeback was announced by Variety on June 2, 2016. Also debuting in the seventh season in this episode is Dre Davis as Sara Harvey.

== Reception ==
=== Ratings ===
In the United States, "Along Comes Mary" was aired on July 19, 2016, to viewership of 1.17 million Americans, down from the previous episode. It garnered a 0.6 rating among adults aged 18–49, according to Nielsen Media Research.

=== Critical response ===
Writing for TV Equals, Mark Trammell gave the episode a mixed review, stating: "it [the episode] was mostly about filling in some blanks from the last few episodes, and not everything we found out was necessarily hard facts," and added, "but still, a fair amount of interesting developments, notably the Jenna/Sara alliance." Paul Dailly, from TV Fanatic, gave the episode 4 out of 5 stars, and called it "fresh", saying: "there is still time for it all to fall apart, but it's all good for the moment. It sure seems like the most patient fans of television are finally being rewarded." Writing for SpoilerTV, Gavin Hetherington responded the episode with mixed to negative reviews, calling it as "boring." However, he praised Noel's return and Alison's actions in the episode, saying, "I have to give major props to Alison for really shining in this episode with her scenes with Mary Drake, as well as the little she had with Jenna too." Jessica Goldstein of Vulture gave the episode 2 out of 5 stars.

Caitlin White of Wetpaint had favorable feelings on the episode and in the seventh season overall, alleging, "this wild ride isn’t slowing down anytime soon."
