= Hold Your Piece =

- Pretty Little Liars episode
- Episode no.: Season 7 Episode 13
- Directed by: Marta Cunningham
- Written by: Bryan M. Holdman
- Cinematography by: Craig Fikse
- Editing by: Robert Lattanzio
- Original air date: May 2, 2017
- Running time: 42 minutes

Guest appearances
- Keegan Allen as Toby Cavanaugh; Brendan Robinson as Lucas Gottesman; Nicholas Gonzalez as Det. Marco Furey; Rebecca Breeds as Nicole Gordon; Kara Royster as Yvonne Phillips; Chloe Bridges as Sydney Driscoll

Episode chronology
| ← Previous "These Boots Were Made for Stalking" | Next → "Power Play" |
- Pretty Little Liars (season 7)

"Hold Your Piece" is the 13th episode of the seventh season of Pretty Little Liars, an American mystery drama television series based on the novel series written by Sara Shepard, and is the 153rd episode of the series. The episode, directed by Marta Cunningham and written by Bryan M. Holdman, originally aired on May 2, 2017 on the cable network Freeform. The episode yielded 0.86 million viewers, a decrease from the previous episode, and garnered a 0.4 rating in the 18-49 demographic.

In the episode, it's Hanna's turn to play the Liar's Lament board game, and "A.D." handles her a task which can bring down her entire career. Meanwhile, Aria and Emily investigate on Sydney, and Spencer goes out with Det. Furey in order to fresh up her mind.

== Plot ==
In Hanna's (Ashley Benson) turn to play the Liar's Lament board game, "A.D." hands her the task of wearing a discriminatory Oriental-themed dress during her meeting with Lucas' (Brendan Robinson) bosses. However, Caleb (Tyler Blackburn) tries to invade the board and a poisonous gas is released from the board. With this, Hanna's reunion is interrupted right in the beginning when she is warned about what happened to him. Ultimately, "A.D." calls Hanna a loser and doesn't give her her piece of the puzzle.

Spencer (Troian Bellisario) is invited by Detective Furey (Nicholas Gonzalez) to visit an educational centre he visited as a child. There, they kiss and Furey makes a bandage on Spencer's wound, remnants of the shooting. Aria (Lucy Hale) and Emily (Shay Mitchell) investigate on Sydney's (Chloe Bridges) strange behaviour using Aria's recent skills of hacking, which were taught to her by Caleb. Sydney reveals to the girls that she allegedly no longer plays Jenna's game, and that Jenna has become someone truly dangerous. However, the girls follow her and discover that she was visiting a clinic for the blind to make a donation for a surgery for Jenna. When asked when name she wants it under, she signs as "A.D.", supposedly for "Anonymous Donor". The girls freak out and Aria reaches Sydney's phone messages. She receives a message from a blocked number, questioning if she had done it, and she confirms. Aria and Emily follow her and confront her, demanding answers. Sydney claims "Anonymous Donor" is merely a client at her bank who wishes to remain anonymous, but Aria and Emily aren't convinced and place a tracker in her bag. Toby (Keegan Allen) and Yvonne (Kara Royster) finally ring up after Yvonne wakes up from the coma; however, during a moment of familiar planning, Yvonne drops the flower bouquet she was holding, dying subsequently. Spencer returns from the outing and encounters a grave Toby crying, as she understands that Yvonne's dead. When Aria arrives home, she discovers Nicole (Rebecca Breeds) is back in Rosewood and is living in Ezra's apartment.

== Production ==
The 153rd episode of the show overall, "Hold Your Piece" was directed by Marta Cunningham and written by executive producer Bryan M. Holdman, serving as Holdman's last writing on the series. The title was revealed by Holdman via Twitter on July 28, 2016. Filming commenced on July 28 and wrapped on August 5, 2016. The installment featured the songs "Wanted to Be Loved" by Daniel Ahearn, and "From the Snow-Tipped Hills" by The Silver Lake Chorus. This episode features recurring appearances from Nicholas Gonzalez as Detective Marco Furey, Brendan Robinson as Lucas Gottesman, Keegan Allen as Toby Cavanaugh, Rebecca Breeds as Nicole Gordon, Kara Royster as Yvonne Phillips, and Chloe Bridges as Sydney Driscoll.

== Reception ==
=== Ratings ===
"Hold Your Piece" premiered on Freeform on May 2, 2017 to an audience of 0.86 million viewers and acquired a 0.4 rating in the 18-49 demographic; both values were a decrease from the previous episode.

=== Reviews ===
Gavin Hetherington from SpoilerTV gave the episode a favorable review. "I will probably say this is the best episode so far in 7B, and a lot of that comes down to the promise of progress," he commented, "I will start off by saying that I thought this was a good episode, and that it makes next week's look even better." While writing for TV Fanatic, Paul Dailly gave the episode a rating of 2.5 out of 5 stars, establishing a mixed opinion: "[the episode] was all over the place with a lot of moments that made me want to turn the TV off. Hopefully, the series can pull it together before it comes to an end."
