= Hit and Run, Run, Run =

- Pretty Little Liars episode
- Episode no.: Season 7 Episode 4
- Directed by: Michael Goi
- Written by: Maya Goldsmith
- Editing by: Robert Lattanzio
- Original air date: July 12, 2016

Guest appearances
- Keegan Allen as Toby Cavanaugh; Vanessa Ray as Charlotte DiLaurentis/CeCe Drake; Nicholas Gonzalez as Det. Marco Furey; Tammin Sursok as Jenna Marshall; David Bianchi as The bartender

Episode chronology
← Previous "The Talented Mr. Rollins"	Next → "Along Comes Mary"
- Pretty Little Liars season 7

"Hit and Run, Run, Run" is the fourth episode of the seventh season of the mystery drama television series Pretty Little Liars, which aired on July 12, 2016, on the cable network Freeform. The episode was written by Maya Goldsmith and directed by Michael Goi.

The episode revolves around the aftermath of Elliott Rollins' gruesome murder at the hands of Hanna Marin, who asks her friends to hide the body and evidences of the crime. Meanwhile, the mysterious Jenna Marshall returns to Rosewood in the best way possible.

"Hit and Run, Run, Run" yielded 1.25 million viewers, and garnered a 0.6 demo rating, up from the previous episode.

== Plot summary ==
The episode starts with Spencer (Troian Bellisario), Aria (Lucy Hale) and Emily (Shay Mitchell) burying Elliott's dead body. Both Hanna (Ashley Benson) and Alison (Sasha Pieterse) are still traumatized for what happened. During the following events, Aria and Alison try to find a way into the psychiatric hospital, while Spencer, Hanna and Emily cover up the tracks. At the Welby State, Aria and Alison finds a way into Alison's room, and Alison tells Aria a secret about the night Charlotte died. In a flashback, Alison and Charlotte (Vanessa Ray) argue about Alison and Elliott's relationship, and Alison leaves the Church minutes before someone killed Charlotte. When Hanna and Aria go to the woods in order to end up with the car, they find out that the vehicle is missing. Mona (Janel Parrish) then appears driving the car, and she reveals that she had covered up some tracks for them. Spencer and Caleb's (Tyler Blackburn) relationship is on the rocks; and, when Caleb appears, trying to talk with Spencer, he ends up speaking about past events, inserting bad feelings between Spencer and Hanna. Overwhelmed, Spencer goes drinking at the Radley, and she ends up meeting Marco Furey (Nicholas Gonzalez), a gentleman who pays her a drink; later, they begin making out in the elevator but Spencer realizes she is cheating on Caleb and stops.

The next day, the Liars and Mona are at the Radley, talking about what happened the night before. Surprising everyone, Jenna Marshall (Tammin Sursok) suddenly appears; she is surprised when she learns that the girls are there, and reveals that she is back to Rosewood to celebrate Toby and Yvonne's engagement. When Toby (Keegan Allen) arrives at the police station and sees Jenna, he argued with her about her sudden appearance in Rosewood. Jenna responds that she wants to make things right. When Spencer enters the loft, she discovers that Caleb left the place. Aria and Emily arrive at Welby State, and they see cops surrounding Alison's room. Then, Toby asks them to follow him. In Hanna's apartment, he talks about his discovery on the true Elliott Rollins, telling them that he died years ago, adding that the Elliott the girls know is a fraud. Toby reveals that Elliott is missing and vows to find him.

Meanwhile, Hanna and Mona are looking for Hanna's golden bracelet on Elliott's car. They find the bracelet and subsequently, Elliott's secret phone, ringing. Mona answers the call, and the caller reveals herself as Jenna Marshall, who refers to Elliott as 'Archer'.

== Production ==
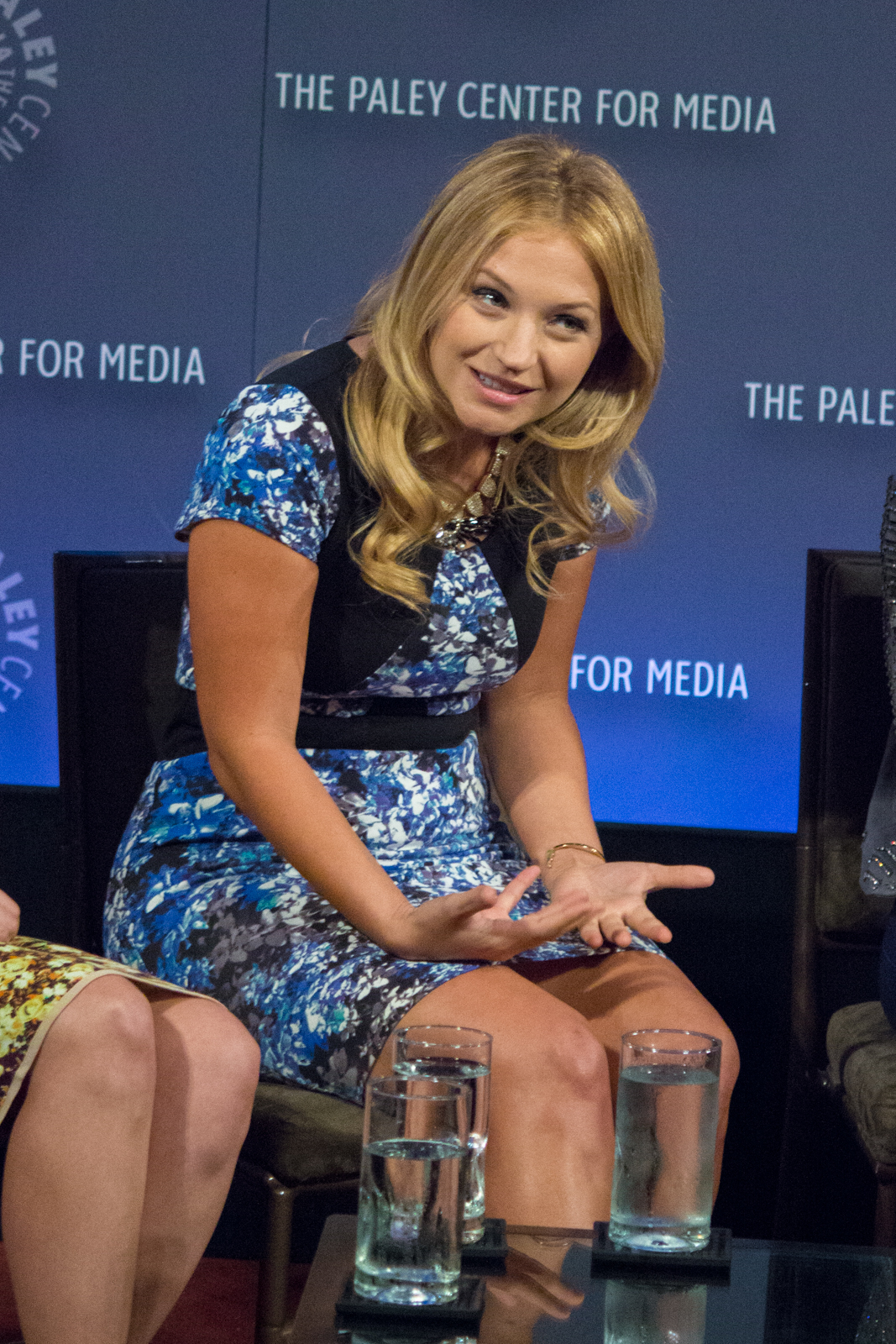
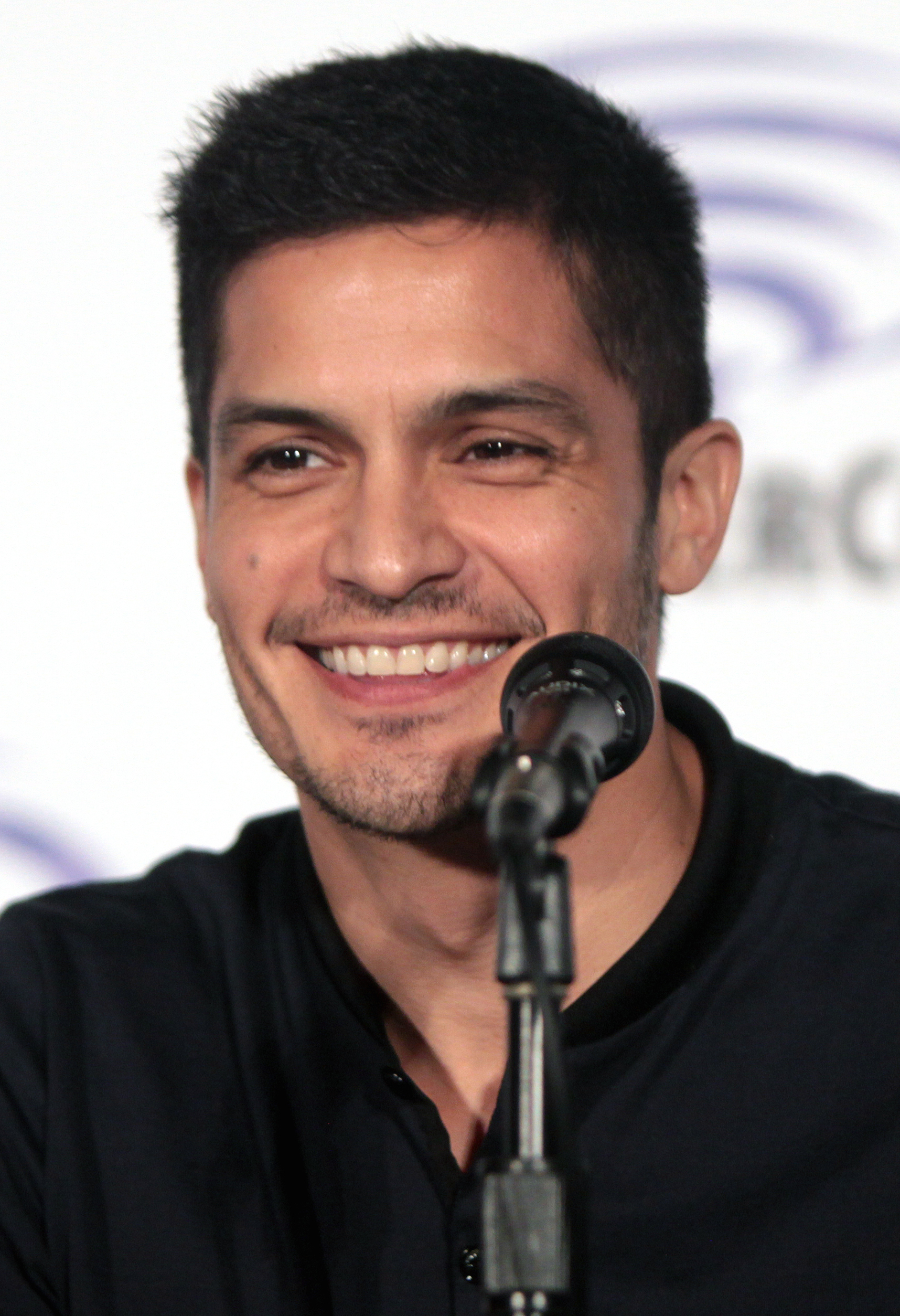
Vanessa Ray (left) and Nicholas Gonzalez (right) make their first appearance in the seventh season during this episode, portraying Charlotte Drake and Marco Furey, respectively.

The episode was written by long-time producer Maya Goldsmith, while being directed by American Horror Story veteran Michael Goi. Tammin Sursok announced her return to the show as Jenna Marshall after last appearing in the fifth-season episode "How the 'A' Stole Christmas". Actors Keegan Allen and Vanessa Ray reprise their roles of Toby Cavanaugh and CeCe Drake/Charlotte DiLaurentis, respectively. Nicholas Gonzalez makes his first appearance on the series as Marco Furey.

== Reception ==
=== Broadcast and ratings ===
In the United States, "Hit and Run, Run, Run" was first aired on July 12, 2016, and it achieved a viewership of 1.25 million Americans, up from the previous episode. The episode garnered a 0.6 rating among adults aged 18–49, according to Nielsen Media Research. After Live +3 DVR ratings, the episode tied for the thirteenth spot in Adults 18-49, finishing with a 1.0 rating among adults aged 18–49, and aired to a total viewership of 2.01 million, placing in the twenty-second spot in viewership.

=== Critical response ===
Mark Trammell, from TV Equals, praised the episode's mysterious and dramatic scenes, and Jenna's return, saying, "Regardless, it was cool seeing Jenna again, and her entrance was suitably epic, and I liked that the show let us know that they haven’t forgotten her and Toby’s checkered past, even if fans might have, by that charged scene between the two later in the episode." Jay Ruymann, from TV Fanatic, gloried Mona Vanderwaal's attitude on the episode, calling her a "professional in covering up murders." "Without Mona, they'd already be in jail," he completed. Ruymann also gave the episode 4.5 out of 5 stars. Meanwhile, Hypable's author Kendra Cleary praised the scene between Spencer, Hanna and Caleb on the episode, commenting, "There was so much love and pain in that room that it made me wish it could somehow work out between all three of them (not in a weird way)."
