= Sydney Driscoll =

- Pretty Little Liars character
- First appearance: "Surfing the Aftershocks"; (Season 5, Episode 3)
- Last appearance: "Power Play"; (Season 7, Episode 14)
- Created by: I. Marlene King; Joseph Dougherty
- Portrayed by: Chloe Bridges

In-universe information
- Alias: "A.D."
- Occupation: "A"; Banker; Member of Mona's Army; Member of Alison's Army
- Residence: Rosewood, Pennsylvania; Fishtown, Philadelphia
- Education: Rosewood High School; Berkeley College
- Status: Alive

Sydney Driscoll is a fictional character in the Freeform television series adaption of the Pretty Little Liars book series, portrayed by Chloe Bridges. Driscoll is introduced as a false protagonist, only to be exposed as a member of Mona's army and a close friend of Jenna Marshall. Sydney returns in the series' seventh season, later revealed to be a helper of "A.D." and a member of the A-Team.

== Casting ==
On April 3, 2014, it was announced that Chloe Bridges was cast as Sydney Driscoll. Showrunner I. Marlene King stated that she had wanted Bridges for the role of Sydney for a few seasons, but waited until she would be able to cast her.

== Development ==
=== Characterization and introduction ===
The character is introduced in the fifth-season episode "Surfing the Aftershocks", as a new swimmer at Rosewood High. She befriends Emily, who begins helping her with her swimming. Driscoll initially appears to be a sweet and soft-spoken student with an identity crisis, although she's later revealed to be working against the Liars.

== Storylines ==
=== Season 5 ===
Emily first notices Sydney in "Surfing the Aftershocks" staring at her by the staircase at Rosewood High and later again at the lockers. Thinking that she is staring because of Alison, Emily confronts her, only for Sydney to disclose that she admires her swimming talent and would love to hear Emily's opinions on her own abilities. At first, Emily is hesitant, but agrees to help her. Emily helps Sydney with her swimming and they later hang out with Paige. Emily later tells Sydney about Alison and Jenna's feud in high school. When the Liars walk into the cafeteria at school, Mona and her army, which includes Sydney, confront Alison. It is later revealed that Jenna and Sydney know each other and they meet with Mona. It is revealed that the three of them are working to take down Alison with someone else.

During "The Silence of E. Lamb", Sydney walks out of a stall in the girls' bathroom as Alison and Emily are talking. She introduces herself to Alison and compliments her scarf. Sydney later discloses to Emily that someone left a rat in Paige's locker after practice. When Emily asks who did it, Sydney tells her no one has fessed up, and the coach wants a team meeting, but Sydney doesn't think it was someone on the Sharks as everyone loves Paige. Emily comments that she hasn't seen Paige yet, and Sydney deduces she skipped school. As Emily walks up to Mona and asks what she knows about Paige's incident, Mona greets Sydney, and Sydney greets her back. At the Brew, Driscoll is standing behind Hanna in the line where she introduces herself and mentions that she's having a hot date with her homework. After asking if Hanna's on her way out, Hanna replies she just had dinner at Emily's. Sydney senses a whiff of alcohol coming from Hanna's breath and asks if she would like to sit for a minute. When Hanna tells her she's just going to head home, Sydney suggests Hanna to wait for her so they can split a Panini. During their meal, Sydney lifts a newspaper that has the Cavanaugh house explosion on the front, and mentions to Hanna that she was just reading about what happened. Hanna says that they were at Emily's house when it happened, and when Driscoll asks if she knew who lived in the house, Hanna tells her that their friend Toby grew up there with his stepsister Jenna. Sydney states that Jenna's name keeps popping up, and that people seem to have a lot of beef with her and asks Hanna if she's ever wanted to make peace with Hanna. Hanna informs her that there was always the possibility that they could have done so and almost slips about the events that took place in New York with Shana. Having grabbed some more coffee, Sydney suggests dropping off Hanna off at home, but Hanna tells her she'll walk home instead. After asking if she's sure, Driscoll picks up her books and tells Hanna that she'll see her at school before walking out.

In "Scream For Me", Sydney is changing in the Rosewood High locker rooms when Emily approaches her. Emily couldn't watch practice because she got hung up in the language lab before thanking Sydney for helping Hanna sober up the night before. She questions Sydney about what Hanna might've said and whether she mentioned New York. Sydney says she didn't and wonders why Emily really came into the locker rooms. Sydney discloses to Emily the team wants her to be the assistant coach, but Emily says she already has a lot going on. Walking into Emily's bedroom, Sydney hands Emily the hooded sweatshirt and says she got ahead of herself. She explains that since they've stopped training together, Driscoll just wanted to have someone in the bleachers cheering for her, since her boyfriend is off in college and her parents aren't into it. Sydney lets it slip that she knows Emily and her friends were in New York, but covers when Emily points out her lie by saying she must've been mixed up from too much time in the pool.

Walking out of a consulting room during "March of Crimes", Jenna and Sydney stop when Emily calls out Sydney. As Emily asks Driscoll what she's doing at the Optometrists office, Marshall explains that Sydney was her ride, before asking if it posed a problem. Emily wonders when Jenna and Sydney became friends, and when Marshall attempts to get Sydney to walk away with her, Spencer instructs Sydney to answer Emily's questions. Stepping in, Jenna says that it sounded more like an accusation, and when Emily asks Driscoll why she never mentioned being friends with Jenna. This leads to a heated argument, and Marshall eventually leaves accompanied by Sydney. Later on the episode, Driscoll reveals to Emily that she met Jenna when she volunteered at a school for the visually impaired and have remained friends ever since the day Alison visited Marshall to threaten her. Driscoll returned to Rosewood per Marshall's request, fearing that Alison would bully her once more. In order to get back at Sydney for her betrayal, Emily decides to accept the coaching position in order to keep an eye on her as much. Emily then proceeds to drive away and leave Driscoll stood up in the middle of the street.

Throughout "How the 'A' Stole Christmas", Jenna is part of the school choir who are singing Christmas songs for the Shady Days Nursing Home, alongside Paige, Emily, Lucas and Sydney. Unbeknownst at the time, Jenna is one of Alison's followers at the Masquerade Ice Ball. Still wearing a mask, Jenna and another one of Alison's followers, later revealed as Driscoll, pose for a photo with Lucas, who is dressed as Santa Claus. Lucas tells the two masked beauties to come in closer, and after the photo is taken, he wishes them a Merry Christmas. After gaining Emily's attention, Marshall and Sydney begin walking through the crowd, with Driscoll looking over her shoulder to make sure Emily would follow her trace. As Emily enters the room which has been draped off with fabric, Jenna sits on the couch, while Sydney reveals herself to Emily and explains that she led Emily to an isolated location because she didn't want Alison to witness them talking. As Driscoll walks towards Jenna, Emily tells Sydney that she really gets around, and questions if Jenna knows Sydney is with Alison now. Jenna then takes off her mask and reveals to Emily they suspect Alison of being accountable for Mona's murder.

=== Season 7 ===
In "The DArkest Knight", Mona and Caleb manage to bug Jenna's cellphone and eavesdrop a voice message she left for Noel after he failed to return any of her calls. Afterwards, Hanna contacts Mona to help her return to Rosewood with a convincing narrative after having abducted Noel. Once Hanna successfully fabricates a story to the police on how she went to Hollybrook to track down the girl Kahn pushed down a flight of stairs at a frat party, Mona purposely bumps into Marshall at The Radley. Jenna is given an ultimatum to conspire with the Liars, after Mona implies that Marshall's partnership with Noel would send both of them to prison. Jenna initially subdues to Mona's coercion, seeing as her and Caleb later await for Marshall by the Radley's bar. Nonetheless, Jenna manages to trick the duo after hiring Sydney to pose as a decoy and serve them coffee in order to buy Marshall sufficient time to track down the Liars at gunpoint at an abandoned school for blind students.

Throughout "Hold Your Piece", Aria and Emily team up to track down Sydney's whereabouts in hopes of finding Jenna. After searching her name online, they discover that Driscoll graduated from Berkeley College, with a double major in Economics and French. Sydney currently resides in a loft at Fishtown, Philadelphia, whilst working as a bank teller at a private department that services extremely wealthy clients. The girls also learn that Sydney checked into a charity gala for the Manhattan Children's Hospital, the same ball where Katherine made an appearance wearing Hanna's dress. Following this enlightenment, Emily googles the event and comes across a picture of Daly posing on a red carpet whilst Driscoll sneakily uses a phone to photograph her dress. The girls deduce that Sydney's loyalty to Marshall places her as the strongest contender serving as Spencer's shooter. They conclude Driscoll most likely made adjustments for Marshall to be clothed in a duplicate of Hanna's dress so Jenna could omit the truth from the authorities. Aria promptly suggests for her and Emily to head over to Sydney's address to gather more insight into the situation. Following a quick lesson from Caleb on spying techniques, Aria instructed Emily to approach Driscoll and clone her phone. During a conversation with Emily at an outdoor diner, Sydney explains that she tried to distance herself from Marshall over the years. Driscoll further adds that she did the coffee delivery unbeknownst that Noel and Jenna were intending to kill the girls. Their interaction is cut short once Sydney informs Emily that she has conference calls all afternoon. However, this information is quickly proven to be false. Through access to Driscoll's phone, the girls discover that Sydney had an appointment at the Vogel Vision Institute and eavesdrop the meeting. Turns out Driscoll was paying for an operation to give Jenna her sight back and she uttered the initials "A.D." as the donor for the cost. After Sydney exits the clinic, Aria and Emily aggressively confront her. Driscoll still claimed to not knowing where Marshall was, so Aria slipped a tracker in her bag to maintain her under their radar.

In "Power Play", Emily reveals that Driscoll played them and left the device on a greyhound to Philadelphia. Aria receives a FaceTime call from a blocked number on her iPad. Once she answers, we see "A.D." in a black hoodie on the other end. The mysterious entity divulges to Aria they own a stolen file from Jessica DiLaurentis' burnt lair at Carol Ward's storm cellar containing information that could send Ezra to jail. Aria immediately disconnects the call, marches over to the board game, and hurls her player piece across the room. Later in the episode, Aria and Alison are following the game's directions for Ali's turn. Abruptly, the game phone starts making a quacking sound in Ali's purse, which confuses the two girls momentarily until Aria spots a nearby store called the Darling Duck. Suddenly, Aria gets another FaceTime request on her phone, so she urges Ali to go inside, assuring her that she'll meet her in a minute. When Aria glances down at her phone, she sees a message from "A.D." that reads: “Meet me now,” with a GPS location. She immediately turns and heads in the opposite direction of the store to her secret rendezvous with "A.D.". Once Aria arrives at the specified location, she makes her way inside a black limo, where she's greeted by "A.D.", revealed to be Sydney. Aria begins to question her about of all of the things she had done to them, namely shooting Spencer, helping Jenna escape, and creating the board game. Sydney admits to doing so and attempts to lure Aria into A-Team. As the two are talking, Aria notices that Sydney is using an earpiece to communicate with the driver and confronts her about it, revealing that Sydney is not "A.D." and is just a member of the team. Sydney reveals that Aria has earned her first piece of "A.D.'s" trust by leaving Ali and agreeing to meet her in the limo. When Aria questions Sydney's motives for being on the A-Team, she explains that working for their enemy means being a part of the "winning team". After being dropped off, Aria reunited with her friends but didn't mention anything about her run-in with Sydney. She received a text message from "A.D." asking if she had made a decision about Sydney's offer.

During "Till Death Do Us Part", Spencer's identical twin sister, Alex Drake is revealed to be the elusive "A.D." Spencer questions her sister about the blind school shooting, asking if it was her and Sydney who were there shooting. Alex reveals that Sydney was not there, meaning she previously lied to Aria, and then describes Sydney as merely a "one-off". Alex reveals she blackmailed Sydney to work for her after finding out that she was stealing from the bank she works at and because she fit the "A" hoodie.

== Reception ==
When Driscoll was revealed to be one of A.D.'s minions, reception was largely positive. De Elizabeth from Teen Vogue was particularly favorable towards the scene when Sydney offers Aria Montgomery a chance to work with the Liars' tormentor. Gavin Hetherington from SpoilerTV labeled her reveal as an accomplice a "sigh of relief".
