= The Talented Mr. Rollins =

- Pretty Little Liars episode
- The Liars chatting in the beginning of the episode.
- Episode no.: Season 7 Episode 3
- Directed by: Zetna Fuentes
- Written by: Jonell Lennon
- Editing by: Melissa Gearhart
- Original air date: July 5, 2016
- Running time: 42 minutes

Guest appearances
- Keegan Allen as Toby Cavanaugh; Huw Collins as Elliott Rollins; Lulu Brud as Sabrina; Kara Royster as Yvonne Phillips; Troy Vincent as Dr. Freedman; David Westberg as Jacob; Macy Peele as Eliza; Amelia Harris as Rachel

Episode chronology
← Previous "Bedlam"	Next → "Hit and Run, Run, Run"
- Pretty Little Liars season 7

"The Talented Mr. Rollins" is the third episode of the seventh season of the mystery drama television series Pretty Little Liars, which premiered on July 5, 2016, on the cable network Freeform. The episode was written by Jonell Lennon and directed by Zetna Fuentes. The episode focuses on the four protagonists trying to find a way to rescue Alison from the psychiatric hospital, and, during the process, they end up making a terrible, huge mistake.

"The Talented Mr. Rollins" was watched by 1.12 million viewers, and garnered a 0.5 demo rating, down from the previous episode.

== Plot ==
Emily (Shay Mitchell) connects the puzzle pieces as she understands Elliott and Mary might be working together. Toby (Keegan Allen) and Yvonne (Kara Royster) get engaged. Spencer (Troian Bellisario) feels like breaking up with Caleb (Tyler Blackburn) because apparently he still loves Hanna (Ashley Benson). Emily reveals her true feelings to Sabrina (Lulu Brud). Aria (Lucy Hale) and Hanna find out about Elliott and Charlotte's love affair. The ladies attempt to rescue Alison (Sasha Pieterse) from the psychiatric hospital to protect her from Uber A's threats, but in the process, Hanna accidentally hits Elliott (Huw Collins) with her car, killing him instantly.

== Production ==
The episode was written by Jonell Lennon and directed by Zetna Fuentes. The episode's title was revealed by Lennon on May 9, 2016, via Twitter. The title is a reference to the 1955 novel The Talented Mr. Ripley by Patricia Highsmith. The table read for this episode occurred on April 25, 2016. Filming started on April 28 and wrapped on May 5, 2016.

== Reception ==
=== Broadcast and ratings ===
In the United States, "The Talented Mr. Rollins" was first aired on July 5, 2016, and it achieved a viewership of 1.12 million Americans. The episode garnered a 0.5 rating among adults aged 18–49, according to Nielsen Media Research. After Live +3 DVR ratings, the episode finished in the fifteenth spot in Adults 18–49, finishing with a 0.9 rating among adults aged 18–49, and aired to a total viewership of 1.85 million, placing in the seventeenth spot in viewership.

=== Critical response ===
While writing for TV Equals, Mark Trammell gave a favorable review for the episode, saying that it was an "all in all, on okay episode, mostly redeemed by that ending." He also assumed that Elliott wasn't Uber A, saying that Sara Harvey could probably be. Jessica Goldstein of Vulture gave the episode 3 out of 5 stars, and also praised the twist on the plot, commenting: "considering all the gross, sexy-bloody imagery we've had of girls so far this season (and, when you think about it, this entire series), it was mighty satisfying/disgusting to watch blood ooze out of Elliot's sad-guppy mouth," and continued, "it was like we were in a time warp back in high school."
