= Nicholas Gonzalez =

American actor

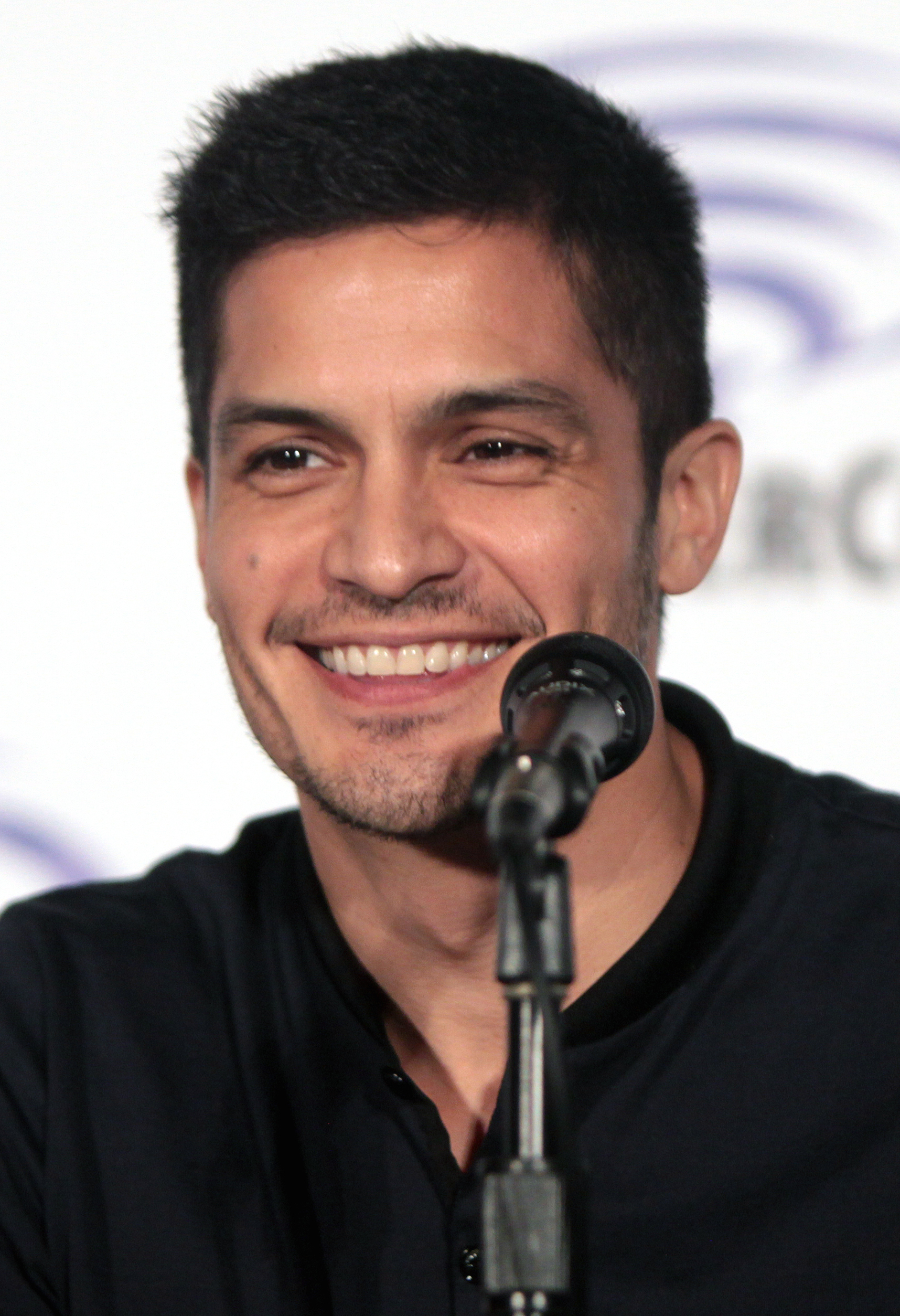
- Gonzalez in 2016
- Born: Nicholas Edward Gonzalez; January 3, 1976 (age 50); San Antonio, Texas, U.S.
- Other name: Nick Gonzalez
- Education: Stanford University
- Occupation: Actor
- Years active: 1998—present
- Spouse: Kelsey Crane (m. 2016)
- Children: 2

Nicholas Edward Gonzalez is an American actor. He is best known for portraying the roles of Alex Santiago on the Showtime television series Resurrection Blvd., Dr. Ben Douglas in Anacondas (2004) and Dr. Neil Melendez on the ABC television series The Good Doctor.

== Early life and education ==
Gonzalez was born in San Antonio, Texas. He is of Mexican descent. He is the son of a dermatologist surgeon, Dr. John Gonzalez, and his mother is Sylvia Mosier. He has an older brother named Dr John Joseph Gonzalez and a younger sister named Madeline Mosier. Gonzalez is conversant in Spanish, having lived in a bilingual household. He attended Central Catholic High School in San Antonio, where he was an accomplished cross-country and track runner, winning the Texas State Championship in the mile and two-mile. After graduating in 1994 and turning down a presidential appointment to West Point, Gonzalez pursued an English degree at Stanford University in California. He spent two terms at Oxford University in England. The following summer, he returned to Europe on a research grant where he studied at Oxford and Trinity College, Dublin to complete his thesis on James Joyce's Ulysses. While at Stanford he had chanced on acting after taking an improvisational theatre elective and began taking part in student theater. He was approached to do a one-man theater piece called Gas by María Irene Fornés. Alma Martinez, an actress and Stanford professor, encouraged him to become a professional actor.

Upon graduating from Stanford in 1998 Gonzalez decided to pursue acting and, with Martinez's help, connected with the theatrical movement in San Francisco. He was once encouraged to use his middle name Edward to conceal his ethnicity and go by "Nicholas Edward" but declined to do so.

== Career ==
In 1998, Gonzalez moved to Los Angeles, where he landed small parts in television series such as ABC's Dharma and Greg and NBC's One World.

Gonzalez then appeared as Fidel Castro's son in the Lifetime television movie My Little Assassin, starring Joe Mantegna and Gabrielle Anwar. His role as Andy, the gay yuppie on MTV's Undressed in which he appeared for six episodes, gained his first widespread attention.

Gonzalez wrapped production of two films in 2000. The first, Scenes of the Crime, premiered at the 2001 Cannes Film Festival, and starred Jeff Bridges, Jon Abrahams, and Noah Wyle. It was directed by Dominique Forma. The second film was an independent project titled Spun, starring Mena Suvari, Mickey Rourke, Brittany Murphy, and John Leguizamo. It played at the 2003 Sundance Film Festival. Gonzalez's also landed the lead in Showtime's original series Resurrection Blvd., which premiered June 26, 2000. Gonzalez played Alex Santiago, a pre-med student who dropped out of school to become a professional boxer. The movie was successful and immediately expanded to become a regular weekly series on the network.

While continuing his work on Resurrection Blvd., Gonzalez appeared in episodes of Walker, Texas Ranger and That '70s Show. He also appeared in the film The Princess and the Barrio Boy (released as She's in Love in Europe) with his Resurrection Blvd. co-star, Marisol Nichols.

Gonzalez continued his career in films with two more titles. The first, Sea of Dreams, was filmed in Veracruz, Mexico, in May, 2003. Nick then went to Fiji for the summer, where he completed production of Anacondas: The Hunt for the Blood Orchid, which opened in theaters August 27, 2004. Gonzalez also appeared in Melrose Place (2009). In 2011, he played Mateo on the ABC show Off The Map.

Gonzalez costarred in the Lifetime series Witches of East End. Gonzalez also appeared in recurring roles as Detective Marco Furey in Freeform's series Pretty Little Liars, antagonist Dominick Flores on How to Get Away with Murder and the boyfriend of Lisa Vidal's character on Being Mary Jane. He also guest-starred on Narcos as an undercover DEA special agent based in Colombia investigating the Cali Cartel, a role which required him to speak Spanish.

Gonzalez also provided the physical Performance (motion capture) of Nick Mendoza in the video game Battlefield: Hardline.

In 2017, Gonzalez was cast as a series regular in the role of surgeon Dr. Neil Melendez in the medical drama The Good Doctor, his most high-profile role to date. His portrayal of the character was partly based on his father and older brother, both of whom are doctors.

== Awards ==
In 2018, Gonzalez was awarded an Impact Award by the National Hispanic Media Coalition for his "Outstanding Performance in a Television Series".

== Personal life ==
Gonzalez finished 2nd at the World Poker Tour Celebrity Invitational in 2009.

Gonzalez married Kelsey Crane on April 16, 2016. The couple have a daughter, and a son.

== Filmography ==
=== Film ===
Year	Title	Role	Notes
2001	Scenes of the Crime	Marty	
2002	Marco Polo: Return to Xanadu	Young Marco (voice)	
2002	Spun	Angel	
2004	Anacondas: The Hunt for the Blood Orchid	Dr. Ben Douglas	
2005	Dirty	Officer Rodriguez	
2006	Behind Enemy Lines II: Axis of Evil	Lt. Robert James	Direct-to-video
2007	Rockaway	Trane	
2009	Down for Life	Officer Gutierrez	
2009	Falling Awake	Eddie	
2011	S.W.A.T.: Firefight	Justin Kellogg	Direct-to-video
2013	Water & Power	Power	
2014	The Purge: Anarchy	Carlos	
2017	Pray for Rain	Nico Reynoso	
2020	Beneath Us	Homero Silva	
2020	Evil Takes Root	Felix Fojas	
2022	Borrego	Deputy Sheriff Jose Gomez	
TBA	Iron Jane †		Post-production

=== Television ===
Year	Title	Role	Notes
1998	Dharma & Greg	Juan	Episode: "Brought to you in Dharmavision"
1999	Undressed	Andy	Recurring role 6 episodes
1999	My Little Assassin	Andre Castro	Television film
2000	The Princess and the Barrio Boy	Sol Torres	Television film
2000	Walker, Texas Ranger	Juan Guerrero	Episode: "Golden Boy"
2000–2002	Resurrection Blvd.	Alex Santiago	Main cast 53 episodes
2002	That '70s Show	Thomas	Episode: "Jackie Says Cheese"
2004	American Family	Young Conrado Gonzalez	Recurring role (season 2); 13 episodes
2004–2005	The O.C.	D.J.	Recurring role (season 2); 6 episodes
2004–2005	Law & Order: Special Victims Unit	Detective Miguel Sandoval	2 episodes
2005	Ghost Whisperer	Teo de la Costa	Episode: "Shadow Boxer"
2006	Ugly Betty	Carlo Medina	Episode: "Fey's Sleigh Ride"
2007	Grey's Anatomy	Clark West	Episode: "Love/Addiction"
2008	Brothers & Sisters	Mario	Episode: "Compromises"
2008	True Blood	Jerry	Episode: "Mine"
2009	CSI: Miami	Alfonso Reyes	Episode: "Presumed Guilty"
2009	Mental	Dr. Arturo Suarez	Main cast 13 episodes
2009–2010	Melrose Place	Detective Rodriguez	Recurring role 8 episodes
2010	The Closer	Marc Torres	Episode: "Last Woman Standing"
2010	After the Fall	Eugene Gibbs	Television film
2011	Off the Map	Mateo	Recurring role 9 episodes
2011	The Glades	Raphael Dominga	Episode: "Family Matters"
2011	Memphis Beat	Dominic	Episode: "Ten Little Memphians"
2011	Two and a Half Men	Baker	Episodes: "Nine Magic Fingers", "A Giant Cat Holding a Churro"; On former episode, he is uncredited. On latter episode, he is credited.
2011	Charlie's Angels	Roman Stone	Episode: "Bon Voyage, Angels"
2011	We Have Your Husband	Raul	Television film
2012	Grimm	Ryan Showalter	Episode: "Tarantella"
2012–2013	Underemployed	Keith Powers	4 episodes
2012	Left to Die	Alex	Television film
2013	A Fairytale Christmas	Hunter Lowell	Hallmark Movie
2013–2014	Sleepy Hollow	Detective Luke Morales	Recurring role (season 1); 6 episodes
2013	Witches of East End	Anthony	Episode: "Pilot"
2013	Christmas Belle	Hunter Lowell	Television film
2014	Resurrection	Deputy Connor Cupit	Episode: "The Returned"
2014	BoJack Horseman	Cartel Man (voice)	Episode: "BoJack Horseman: The BoJack Horseman Story, Chapter One"
2014	Modern Family	Diego	Episode: "Queer Eyes, Full Hearts"
2014–2015	Jane the Virgin	Marco Esquivel	3 episodes
2015–2016	The Flash	Dante Ramon / Rupture, Savitar	3 episodes
2015	Bones	Eric Morales	Episode: "The Senator in the Street Sweeper"
2016	Bordertown	Ernesto Gonzalez / J.C. Gonzalez / Pablo Barracuda (voice)	Main cast 13 episodes
2016	Bosch	Detective Ignacio Ferras	Episode: "Trunk Music"
2016	Lucifer	Detective Daniel Espinoza	Episode: "Pilot"; Original pilot
2016	NCIS	David Silva	Episode: "Rogue"
2016	Frequency	Ted Cardenas	3 episodes
2016	American Dad!	Ricky (voice)	Episode: "Stan-Dan Deliver"
2016–2017	Pretty Little Liars	Detective Marco Furey	Recurring role (season 7); 12 episodes
2017	How to Get Away with Murder	Dominick Flores	Guest (season 3); Recurring role (season 4); 5 episodes
2017	Narcos	Agent Lopez	Recurring role (season3) 2 episodes
2017; 2019	Being Mary Jane	Orlando Lagos	Recurring role (season 4); Guest (season 5); 12 episodes
2017–2020	The Good Doctor	Dr. Neil Melendez	Main cast (seasons 1–3); Special Guest Star (season 4); 58 episodes
2019	Undone	Tomas	2 episodes
2019	Christmas on the Range	Clint McCree	Television film
2021	Playing Cupid	David Martinez	Television film
2021–2024	La Brea	Captain Levi Delgado	Main role
2024	The Irrational	Zed Mathis	1 episode
2026	Criminal Minds	Peter O'Connor	1 episode

=== Video games ===
Year	Title	Role	Notes
2015	Battlefield: Hardline	Nick Mendoza	Motion capture only
