= List of Pretty Little Liars characters =

Some of the female cast of the show from left to right: Sasha Pieterse, Shay Mitchell, Lucy Hale, Troian Bellisario, Ashley Benson and Janel Parrish

Pretty Little Liars is an American teen drama television series created by I. Marlene King for Freeform. It is based on Sara Shepard's novel series of the same name. Some of the characters appeared in the spin-off shows Pretty Dirty Secrets, Ravenswood, Pretty Little Liars: The Perfectionists and Pretty Little Liars (2022). Below is a list consisting of the many characters who have appeared throughout the original series' seven-season run.

== Overview - main series ==
The following table contains an overall look on the main, recurring and guest characters. The guest characters, marked in blue, have appeared in one, two or three episodes per season they are denoted. The recurring characters, marked in red, have appeared in four or more episodes in the season they are denoted. The main characters, marked in green, are those whose portrayer has had received ensemble cast billing in at least one episode in the season they are denoted.

Character	Portrayed by	Appearances						
Character	Portrayed by	1	2	3	4	5	6	7
Main characters
Spencer Hastings	Troian Bellisario	Main	Main	Main	Main	Main	Main	Main
Alex Drake	Troian Bellisario							Recurring
Hanna Marin	Ashley Benson	Main	Main	Main	Main	Main	Main	Main
Ella Montgomery	Holly Marie Combs	Main	Main	Main	Guest	Guest	Recurring	Guest
Aria Montgomery	Lucy Hale	Main	Main	Main	Main	Main	Main	Main
Ezra Fitz	Ian Harding	Main	Main	Main	Main	Main	Main	Main
Maya St. Germain	Bianca Lawson	Main	Main	Recurring				
Ashley Marin	Laura Leighton	Main	Main	Main	Main	Main	Main	Main
Byron Montgomery	Chad Lowe	Main	Main	Main	Guest	Guest	Recurring	Guest
Emily Fields	Shay Mitchell	Main	Main	Main	Main	Main	Main	Main
Pam Fields	Nia Peeples	Main (Note: In the first season, Peeples is initially credited as a series regular in Pilot (1.01); however, from the next episode onward, she is credited as a guest star.)	Recurring	Recurring	Recurring	Guest	Recurring	Guest
Alison DiLaurentis	Sasha Pieterse	Main (Note: In the first season, Pieterse is credited as a guest star in Pilot (1.01); however, from the next episode onward, she is credited as a series regular.)	Main	Main	Main	Main	Main	Main
Caleb Rivers	Tyler Blackburn	Recurring	Recurring	Main	Main	Main	Main	Main
Mona Vanderwaal	Janel Parrish	Recurring	Recurring	Main	Main	Main	Main	Main
Jessica DiLaurentis	Andrea Parker (Note: Jessica was portrayed by Anne Marie DeLuise in Season 1.)	Guest	Guest		Recurring	Guest	Recurring	Guest
Mary Drake	Andrea Parker				Guest		Guest	Main
Recurring characters
"A"	Stand-in	Recurring	Recurring	Recurring	Recurring	Recurring	Recurring	Recurring
Toby Cavanaugh	Keegan Allen (Note: In the series' pilot episode, Cavanaugh was portrayed by James Neate. Subsequent episodes featured Allen in the role.)	Recurring	Recurring	Recurring	Recurring	Recurring	Recurring	Recurring
Mike Montgomery	Cody Allen Christian	Recurring	Recurring		Recurring	Recurring	Guest	
Melissa Hastings	Torrey DeVitto	Recurring	Recurring	Recurring	Guest	Recurring	Guest	Guest
Darren Wilden	Bryce Johnson	Recurring	Recurring	Recurring	Guest		Guest	
Ian Thomas	Ryan Merriman (Note: In the series' pilot episode, Thomas was portrayed by Carlo Marks. Subsequent episodes featured Merriman in the role.)	Recurring	Recurring		Guest			
Wren Kingston	Julian Morris	Recurring	Recurring	Recurring	Guest			Guest
Jenna Marshall	Tammin Sursok	Recurring	Recurring	Recurring	Guest	Guest		Recurring
Sean Ackard	Chuck Hittinger	Recurring						
Peter Hastings	Nolan North	Recurring	Recurring	Guest	Recurring	Recurring	Guest	Guest
Noel Kahn	Brant Daugherty	Recurring	Recurring	Guest	Guest	Guest		Recurring
Veronica Hastings	Lesley Fera	Recurring	Recurring	Recurring	Recurring	Recurring	Recurring	Recurring
Alex Santiago	Diego Boneta	Recurring						
Lucas Gottesman	Brendan Robinson	Recurring	Recurring	Recurring		Recurring	Guest	Recurring
Paige McCullers	Lindsey Shaw	Recurring	Guest	Recurring	Recurring	Recurring		Recurring
Garrett Reynolds	Yani Gellman	Guest	Recurring	Recurring				
Tom Marin	Roark Critchlow	Guest	Recurring		Guest	Guest		
Kate Randall	Natalie Hall (Note: Kate was portrayed by Natalie Floyd in Season 1.)	Guest	Recurring					
Jason DiLaurentis	Drew Van Acker (Note: Jason was portrayed by Parker Bagley in Season 1.)	Guest	Recurring	Recurring	Guest	Recurring	Recurring	Guest
Samara Cook	Claire Holt	Guest	Recurring					
Jackie Molina	Paloma Guzmán	Guest	Recurring			Guest		
Anne Sullivan	Annabeth Gish		Recurring	Guest			Guest	
Holden Strauss	Shane Coffey		Recurring	Guest				Guest
Meredith Sorenson	Amanda Schull	Guest	Guest	Recurring				
Shana Fring	Aeriél Miranda		Guest (Note: Miranda is uncredited in her appearance.)	Recurring	Recurring	Guest		
CeCe Drake	Vanessa Ray			Recurring	Guest	Guest	Guest	Recurring
Ted Wilson	Edward Kerr			Recurring	Guest	Guest		Guest
Lyndon James	Sterling Sulieman			Recurring				
Wesley Fitzgerald	Gregg Sulkin			Recurring				
Malcolm Cutler	Teo Briones (Note: In "Single Fright Female", Cutler was portrayed by Flynn Morrison. Subsequent episodes featured Briones in the role.)			Recurring	Guest			
Maggie Cutler	Larisa Oleynik			Guest	Recurring			
Gabriel Holbrook	Sean Faris				Recurring	Recurring		
Linda Tanner	Roma Maffia				Recurring	Recurring	Recurring	Guest
Travis Hobbs	Luke Kleintank				Recurring	Guest		
Jake	Ryan Guzman				Recurring			
Kenneth DiLaurentis	Jim Abele			Guest		Recurring	Recurring	
Andrew Campbell	Brandon Jones			Guest	Guest	Recurring	Guest	
Cindy	Melanie Moreno					Recurring	Guest	
Mindy	Monica Moreno					Recurring	Guest	
Sydney Driscoll	Chloe Bridges					Recurring		Guest
Cyrus Petrillo	Jake Weary					Recurring		
Talia Sandoval	Miranda Rae Mayo					Recurring		
Jonny Raymond	Will Bradley					Recurring		
Archer Dunhill	Huw Collins						Recurring	Recurring
Sara Harvey	Dre Davis (Note: In the third, fourth and fifth seasons, Harvey was portrayed by doubles and stock photos.)						Recurring	Guest
Liam Greene	Roberto Aguire						Recurring	Guest
Jordan Hobart	David Coussins						Recurring	Guest
Lorenzo Calderon	Travis Winfrey						Recurring	
Sabrina	Lulu Brud						Recurring	Recurring
Clark Wilkins	Titus Makin Jr.						Recurring	
Yvonne Phillips	Kara Royster						Guest	Recurring
Marco Furey	Nicholas Gonzalez							Recurring
Guest characters
Barry Maple	Jim Titus II	Guest	Guest	Guest	Guest	Guest	Guest	Guest
Wayne Fields	Eric Steinberg	Guest	Guest	Guest	Guest			
Arthur Hackett	John O'Brien	Guest (Note: O’Brien is uncredited in her appearance.)		Guest	Guest	Guest		Guest
Mrs. Welch	Jill Holden	Guest	Guest					
Ben Coogan	Steven Krueger	Guest	Guest					
Isabel Marin	Heather Mazur	Guest	Guest					
Mr. Sheldrake	Keith Pillow	Guest						
Coach Fulton	Paula Newsome	Guest		Guest				
Logan Reed	Tilky Jones	Guest	Guest					
Regina Marin	Betty Buckley		Guest	Guest				
Mr. Tamborelli	John Marshall Jones		Guest					
Duncan Albert	Lachlan Buchanan		Guest					
Harold Crane	Travis Richley		Guest	Guest				
Zack	Steve Talley			Guest	Guest	Guest		
Dianne Fitzgerald	Mary Page Keller			Guest				Guest
Miles Corwin	Andrew Elvis Miller			Guest				
Eddie Lamb	Reggie Austin			Guest	Guest	Guest		
May Horowitz	Cathy Ladman			Guest		Guest	Guest	Guest
Jamie Doyle	Bernard Curry			Guest				
Nigel Wright	Wyatt Nash				Guest			
Hector Lime	Jed Rees				Guest			
Robert Vargas	Joseph Zinsman				Guest			
Louis Palmer	Nick Tate				Guest			
Carla Grunwald	Meg Foster				Guest	Guest		Guest
Dean Stavros	Nathaniel Buzolic				Guest		Guest	
Big Rhonda	Ambrit Millhouse					Guest		
James Neilan	Charles Carpenter					Guest		
Rebecca Marcus	Lauren Tom					Guest		
Lesli Stone	Elizabeth McLaughlin					Guest	Guest	
Colin	Oliver Kieran-Jones					Guest		
Douglas Sirk	Christopher Grove					Guest		
Addison Derringer	Chiara Aurelia					Guest		
Addison Derringer	Ava Allan							Guest
Rhys Matthews	Caleb Lane						Guest	
Nicole Gordon	Rebecca Breeds						Guest	Guest

== Main characters ==
The following list features characters that are considered fundamental to the series' storylines, consisting of the central group deemed as "the Liars" and the main antagonist "A."

=== Spencer Hastings ===
Considered the "de facto leader" of the group, Spencer Hastings, portrayed by Troian Bellisario, is intelligent, extremely ambitious, and strives for perfection in everything she does in an attempt to live up to the high expectations of her parents. Spencer's biggest rival is her older sister, Melissa, and the two are constantly fighting over something. Their relationship is often strained by the fact that Spencer has a habit of crushing on Melissa's boyfriends. In the first season, she begins a relationship with fellow student and strained Rosewood student Toby Cavanaugh. Throughout the series, Spencer is revealed to be the biological daughter of Mary Drake, the sister of Charlotte Drake and twin sister of Alex Drake.

=== Aria Montgomery ===
Considered the "alternative" one of the group, Aria Montgomery, portrayed by Lucy Hale, is more outgoing in fashion and what she sees as acceptable behavior. She moves back to Rosewood with her family after living in Iceland for a year. Before Alison's death, she and Alison discovered that Aria's father was having an affair with one of his former students, Meredith, who became his coworker at Hollis College. Alison encourages Aria to tell her mother the truth, but instead, Aria reluctantly agrees to keep her father's secret. On top of that, she finds herself involved with her high school English teacher, Ezra Fitz, after making out with him in a pub bathroom and discovering he was her English teacher on the first day of school.

=== Hanna Marin ===
Pretty and fierce, Hanna Marin, portrayed by Ashley Benson, is the diva and "it girl" of the group, having taken Alison's place as the most popular girl at Rosewood High. Prior to Alison's death, Hanna suffered from bulimia, which Alison frequently teased her over. Since her parents divorced, Hanna permanently lives with her mother. She feels betrayed by her father, who has remarried, and she does not get along well with his new wife and daughter. When Hanna's mother falls upon financial hardship, she steals thousands of dollars from the bank she worked at, which Hanna is forced to keep a secret.

=== Emily Fields ===
The "jock" of the group, Emily Fields, portrayed by Shay Mitchell, is a highly competitive swimmer, considered the star of Rosewood's swimming team. She is shown as a sweet and shy girl. For a short time, Emily lives with Hanna, after her mother moves to Texas to live with Emily's father, who is stationed in Fort Hood. She begins to question her sexuality because of her feelings for Alison, but later accepts the fact that she is a lesbian and starts to date girls. She eventually begins a relationship with Sara Harvey, until she discovers that she is an ally of the antagonist.

=== Alison DiLaurentis ===
The former "queen bee" of her clique, Alison DiLaurentis, portrayed by Sasha Pieterse, used to be the most popular girl in school before her disappearance and alleged death. Although she cared for her friends, she enjoyed using their deepest secrets against them to keep them in line. Charming and manipulative, Alison was skilled at finding ways to blackmail everyone, and many people hated her. She knew everybody's secrets, but since she's been gone her friends are beginning to realize how little they really knew about her. She is revealed to be alive and on the run from "A."

=== Mona Vanderwaal ===
A former "unpopular" girl at Rosewood, Mona Vanderwaal, portrayed by Janel Parrish, longed to be accepted into Alison's group and was continuously mocked by her. After Alison's disappearance, Mona befriended Hanna and they underwent an "extreme makeover" together; as a result, they both became popular students. When "A" appears, Mona becomes jealous of Hanna rekindling her friendships with the other Liars. She dislikes Caleb and makes attempts to break Hanna and Caleb up, though to no avail. She becomes romantically involved with Noel, much to Hanna's disapproval, but is later dumped by him for Jenna. When "A" begins sending Mona threatening notes, she grows closer to the Liars. In the second-season finale, she is in fact revealed to actually be "A" when she and Spencer travel to the Lost Woods Resort to uncover "A"'s lair. She is committed to a mental institution, Radley, after being diagnosed with borderline personality disorder.

=== "A" ===
The main antagonist, "A" is stalking and torturing the Liars in relentless and creative ways and also threatens their friends and family. In the second-season finale, it is revealed that Mona is "A". She is also the one who stalked Alison before her disappearance. However, when she is sent to Radley sanitarium, she is visited by CeCe Drake, who offers her a partnership and takes over the team of "A"s, known as the A-Team. The team consists of Mona, Toby, Spencer, Sara, Lucas, Melissa, Wilden, Jenna, Noel, and Wren. Five years later, Alex Drake takes over and becomes Uber A, known as "A.D.", and forms the A.D. Team, consisting of Jenna, Sydney, Aria, Wren, Mona, and Mary.

== Acquaintances of Aria Montgomery ==
The following characters are all family members and acquaintances of Aria Montgomery, one of the protagonists of the series.

=== Family ===
- Byron Montgomery (Chad Lowe) (seasons 1–7) is Aria's father and a history professor at Hollis College. He asked Aria to keep his affair with a student, Meredith, a secret after Aria witnessed them kissing. Regretting the affair and wanting them to be a family again, Byron moves the family to Iceland for a year as a sabbatical. The relationship between Byron and Ella becomes strained after A sends her a letter revealing Byron's affair. After spending some time apart, Ella and Byron slowly begin to rebuild their relationship. When Mike becomes depressed, Byron reveals that his brother Scott, who committed suicide, also suffered from mental illness; Byron feels guilty for not doing anything to help his brother. Byron finds out that Ezra is involved in a relationship with Aria after they tell him and Ella and is furious about it. In an effort to get Ezra away from Aria, Byron recommends him for a job in New Orleans. He also plots to send Aria to an all girls boarding school in Vermont. When Aria threatens to reveal his affair to his boss, he backs off from her but gets Ezra fired from Hollis. In season 3, Byron and Ella have divorced and Ella has moved out of the house. Byron starts seeing Meredith again. He informs Aria that Meredith got a job at Rosewood High, were Aria attends and Ella teaches. In the Halloween episode, it is revealed by Garrett that Byron may have seen Alison on the night she died. Alison told him,"you know what I'm capable of!"
- Ella Montgomery (Holly Marie Combs) (seasons 1–7) is Aria's mother, as well as a teacher at Rosewood High. Ella believes in treating her children as friends, not as property. She has mentioned that she doesn't want to push into Aria's private life, and she thinks that Aria should be allowed to keep secrets. Ella was unaware of her husband's affair with a student until "A" sent her a letter. After asking Byron to move out, and his refusal, she left the home. Eventually, Aria found out her parents were secretly getting back together, and Ella decides to move back in. When her son, Mike, is depressed, she doesn't feel he needs medication, and remains somewhat in denial about his illness. She finally receives her wake-up call when he attacks her in his bedroom. When Ella found out Aria was dating Ezra, she was angry, but she believed Aria when she said she had broken it off, and tried to win her back her freedom, which Byron didn't think she deserved. Later, she finds out that Aria and Ezra are still together, and decides she is going to try to understand their relationship. Ella is aware of A, and tries to send Aria to a boarding school to get away. Aria is furious, and blackmails her mother into not going through with it. Ella tearfully tells Aria how ashamed she is, and how she doesn't know how to save their relationship. In season 3, she and Byron have divorced and Ella tries to move on with her life not knowing how. Aria creates a profile for her on a dating website under the nickname "Hot Mamma." Ella is furious at Aria but later she likes the idea and starts dating again. She befriends and starts dating the owner of the brew who is much younger than her. In season 4, she leaves Rosewood so she can go live with her boyfriend in Europe but returns at the end of season 4.
- Mike Montgomery (Cody Christian) (seasons 1–2, 4–6) is Aria's younger brother. A lacrosse player, he suffers from a mental illness, which causes him to burst into fits of anger and later leads him to break into people's houses for fun, before he begins to shut down emotionally and withdraw completely from his family. He blames Aria for the trouble between their parents. Mike accidentally discovered that Jenna and Garrett knew each other when he stole a pot made by Jenna from Garrett's house. Mike reveals to Aria that the only reason he punched Ezra was because after Ezra and Aria announced they are a couple, he feared what Byron would have done to hurt Ezra judging by the look on his face and thought, "better I do it, than him." Throughout the rest of the series he appears to have improved after going to a therapist. It does not tell when or if he was still seeing his therapist. He seemed to forgive Aria and their relationship is better. He stopped being rebellious and more focused of his family's problems and helping them out. He is dating Mona Vanderwaal.

=== Friends ===
- Holden Strauss (Shane Coffey) (seasons 2–3, 7) is a childhood friend of Aria's who returns with his family from a year abroad in Portugal in the middle of Season 2. He asks Aria out on a date, and discovers that she only agreed so she could get out of the house unsupervised and try to meet Ezra. Instead of becoming upset, he suggest that they continue the cover, though he remains secretive about what he does during their fake dates. We later find out that his secret is more serious than it seemed at first when he accidentally reveals a very large bruise on his stomach, but he tells Aria not to worry about it. He eventually tells her that he is doing Tae Kwan Do, a Korean martial art, and that his parents forbid him to keep training, that is why he needs a cover. The situation turns out to be more complicated, though, when Ella tells Aria that Holden has a heart condition that could kill him any time. Aria goes to watch one of Holden's fights and she sees how much he loves to fight. In the sixth episode in season 3, he attends the same church party as Hanna and when Emily arrives, he runs into her and sparks a conversation. When he grabs a cupcake his wrist is exposed revealing a stamp from that night and Noel Kahn's party.
- Clark Wilkins (Titus Makin Jr.) (season 6) is a friend of Aria's whom she met in a photography class at Hollis. Clark is later revealed to be an undercover cop, hired to protect Aria.
- Big Rhonda (Ambrit Millhouse) (season 5) is a patient at Radley Sanitarium that Aria befriends whilst volunteering in an art class. Rhonda tells Aria that she knew Bethany Young, and that Bethany was occasionally visited by Jessica DiLaurentis.

=== Relationships ===
- Ezra Fitz (Fitzgerald) (Ian Harding) (seasons 1–7) is a former English teacher at Rosewood High School and later teaches at Hollis College. He became romantically involved with Aria after the two met at a bar and instantly bonded. When he discovered that Aria was his student, he attempted to break things off, but found himself unable to do so. He broke up with Aria for a little while in order to take time to think about their relationship. He quit his teaching position at Rosewood just before Noel threatened to expose Aria and Ezra's relationship. Ezra later explains to Aria that he was engaged to a girl named Jackie when he was in college, but that she broke it off; Jackie later returns to Rosewood after getting a teaching position at Hollis. Although Ezra loves Aria, he seems to still have some lingering feelings for Jackie, and the two remain close. His relationship with Aria is often strained by the fact that they have to hide that they are together. He confesses to Ella that he loves Aria (though she misunderstands and believes he is talking about Spencer) when he comes to comfort Aria after her arrest. In "Through Many Danger, Toils, and Snares" we find out that Aria broke up with Ezra because of Jackie threatening to expose their relationship but they later get back together after Aria explains to Ezra that Jackie was the reason why she broke up with him. Ezra and Aria later tell Byron and Ella that they are a couple which leads him to getting punched by Mike (though it's told he only did it fearing what Byron what would have done instead). Ezra later tells Jackie, who comes into his office trying to convince him it'll never work out for him and Aria due to age difference and the fact she's still a teenager, to get out of his office, saying he will not let her do anything to harm or hurt Aria ever again and that he wants nothing more to do with Jackie herself. Aria continues to attempt to convince her parents to allow her to date Ezra but in the meantime they try to set her up with someone else. When Aria calls Ezra, he tells her not to call him again. The two later rekindle their relationship when Aria leaves him a voice mail telling Ezra that, if he doesn't meet up with her, their relationship is over for good. Ezra turns up at the last minute after a student tells him to 'be bold' and the two kiss in the rain. Aria decides not to tell her friends that the two are back together, hoping that, by keeping it from them, she can also keep it from "A". They later have sex in his apartment after Ezra finds out that he has been fired from Hollis. In season 3, Aria and Ezra celebrate their one-year anniversary. Their relationship seems to be going smoothly until Ezra's younger brother Wesley "Wes" drops by unexpectedly. Bumps are soon formed in their relationship when Aria learns of Ezra getting his high school girlfriend Maggie pregnant and his mother paying her to disappear from his life, even though he wanted to do the right thing. Aria tracks Maggie down and discovers that she kept the baby, who is now a healthy 7-year-old boy named Malcolm, whom Ezra finds out about from a distraught Spencer. This leads him to leave Rosewood and seek out Maggie and his son; Ezra is back in Rosewood but only one day after he's back he gets a phone call from Maggie; Mrs. Fitzgerald sold Maggie's condo. Maggie asked Ezra if she and Malcolm can stay in Rosewood near him for a couple of days. Later when Spencer is part of the A-team, she picks up Malcolm from his karate class but is actually kidnapping him. Aria frantically tries to find him and when she does he tells her that Aria's friend Alison picked him up. Ezra gets a job at Rosewood High as a substitute teacher. After all the incidents with Malcolm, Aria decides that it is best that her and Ezra break up just after kissing him on the school stairs. In season four Ezra starts teaching full-time at Rosewood High again. After Aria has a dream that Ezra got arrested because of her she decided they should see other people, something Ezra had already suggested. Ezra would still do anything for Aria, as whenever she is having trouble he still steps up to help her. Ezra finds out Malcolm isn't really his son. In the season four summer finale, the Liars find a lair that they believe belongs to "A" and we see that Ezra is the owner, leading fans to believe him to be "A". However, he reveals in "Free Fall" that he is writing a book about Alison. He is also Board Shorts but is not the guy Alison met with at Cape May known as "Beach Hottie". He is shot by someone in a black hoodie, whom he claims was Shana, in the season four finale but survives and later rekindles his relationship with Aria and begins helping them out with "A". In season 7 Ezra and Aria become engaged and get married in the show's finale episode. It is revealed that Aria can't have children so she and Ezra make plans to adopt after their honeymoon.
- Liam Greene (Roberto Aguire) (season 6–7) was Aria's boyfriend during and after the time-jump. He works with her and encourages her to send Ezra to finish his book. Aria later breaks up with him due to not having feelings for him anymore after having sex with Ezra.
- Noel Kahn (Brant Daugherty) (seasons 1–5, 7, and Pretty Dirty Secrets) is a popular jock and friends with Sean and Mike. He has feelings for Aria and briefly dates her, ending things when he discovers that Aria is seeing Ezra. Noel attempts to blackmail Ezra with this information, but ends up getting framed by "A" (for apparently stealing mid-term exams). After a suspension, he returns to school and becomes somewhat romantically involved with Mona, but eventually breaks up with her and starts dating Jenna. On the security tape Noel sent Spencer it shows that Jenna was dating Noel. It was revealed in the season four finale that Noel is helping Alison. Noel is revealed to be a member of the A-Team in Season 7 and was the person who poured blood on Spencer in the Dollhouse. He returned to Rosewood to begin working with Jenna, as well as Sara Harvey, to find Charlotte's sister, later revealed as Alex Drake. However, Noel kills Sara when she threatens their operation. He and Jenna trap the Liars and attempt to kill them but he ends up accidentally getting decapitated.
- Jake (Ryan Guzman) (season 4) is a martial arts instructor in Rosewood. Aria begins to take private lessons to help protect herself from "A". During one of the sessions, Aria kisses him and apologizes. But later, they start to hang out more and go on dates. On one of the dates, he learns about Ezra. With time, Aria and Jake's relationship heads to the next level. When Jake meets Ezra for the first time, he tells him to let Aria move on.

=== Other ===
- Malcolm Cutler (Flynn Morrison, later Teo Briones) (season 3–4) is Maggie Cutler's seven-year-old son, with Ezra believed to be the father. It is later revealed that his father is not Ezra, and was conceived after a "mistake" with another man.
- Maggie Cutler (Larisa Oleynik) (seasons 3–4) is Ezra's ex, who was impregnated by Ezra after high school. She was paid a large sum of money to disappear from Ezra's life and to take care of his unborn child, whom he doesn't know about. In the eleventh episode, Aria pays her a visit at her school, where she reveals that she has a son named Malcolm. In the summer finale, she pays Ezra a visit, leaving Aria out. At the end of the season 4 summer finale, she reveals Malcolm is not Ezra's son. She soon leaves Rosewood with Malcolm to Seattle.
- Dianne Fitzgerald (Mary Page Keller) (season 3, 7) is the mother of Ezra and Wesley Fitzgerald. She is a rich and ruthless woman. Due to her controlling attitude, she is estranged from Ezra. On Season 7, Dianne returns to Ezra's wedding with Aria.
- Wesley Fitzgerald (Gregg Sulkin) (season 3) is the brother of Ezra Fitz. Due to his wish to escape the Fitzgerald family, Wesley stays in Ezra's apartment while he is away and helps Aria to find out about Maggie and Malcolm.
- Jackie Molina (Paloma Guzman) (seasons 1–2, 5) is Ezra's ex-fiancée. After getting a teaching job at Hollis, she hints at wanting to reconcile her relationship with Ezra. She discovers that Aria and Ezra are in a relationship, and uses this as leverage when Aria attempts to force her out of Ezra's life by threatening to expose a paper that Jackie plagiarized. Jackie forces Aria to break up with Ezra but the two later get back together and reveal their relationship to her parents when Ezra overhears Jackie threatening Aria. Ezra later tells Jackie to get out of his office when she comes by his office and to stay away from Aria after Jackie makes a comment about his relationship with Aria being "a terrible mistake", and that he wants nothing to do with Jackie again.
- Meredith Sorenson (Amanda Schull) (seasons 1–3) is a former student at Hollis whom Byron had an affair with. She ignores Aria's pleas for her to stay away from Byron and in an effort to get close to Byron again, attempts to befriend Ella, who was unaware of the affair. In the beginning of season 3, "A" forces Aria to reveal a past secret that Aria and Alison trashed Byron's office and framed Meredith for the crime when Aria believes an earring she found proves that Byron and Meredith were still together after Aria found out about the affair. After the incident Byron did end all ties with Meredith because he felt threatened. But when "A" forces Aria to confess it was her, it gives now divorced Byron and Meredith another chance at a relationship. When Aria is forced to confess and apologize to Meredith, she returns the earring "A" gave her, which was taken from Alison's grave, only to find out the earring is not hers. Meredith became a teacher at Rosewood High. She later was burnt in a fire and led to believe that Aria did it (She's Better Now). In the episode "Misery Loves Company!", when Aria is sick, Meredith plays mom by taking care of her, when in reality she drugs Aria's tea to search her house. After Aria becomes suspicious, Meredith lures Aria down to the basement where she falls and becomes unconscious. When Hanna and Emily check on Aria, they too are tricked down into the basement. Byron finds them and Meredith escapes. It is revealed that Byron didn't kill Alison, even though she was blackmailing him about the affair.
- Simone (Alona Tal) (season 1) is Aria's former babysitter. She comes back to Rosewood to visit her parents and also to help Ella Montgomery with her English class, where she is asked to be a speaker as an experienced freelance writer. She befriends Ezra Fitz thanks to the suggestion of Ella, much to Aria's chagrin. Simone develops a crush on Ezra, much to Aria's horror. Simone is oblivious to Aria's feelings, and the two have coffee together. After that, Ezra picks up on Aria's envying Simone, who is a talented writer and also age appropriate for Ezra. He admits to enjoying the time spent with her, but assures her that it's nothing more than that.
- Zack (Steve Talley) (seasons 3–5) is the former owner of The Brew and used to be engaged to Ella Montgomery.

== Acquaintances of Spencer Hastings ==
The following characters are all family members and acquaintances of Spencer Hastings, one of the protagonists of the series.

=== Family ===
- Alex Drake (Troian Bellisario) (season 7) is the twin sister to Spencer Hastings and the half-sister of Charlotte Drake, Melissa Hastings, and Jason DiLaurentis, as well as the daughter of Mary Drake and Peter Hastings. Alex was given up for adoption to a British family by Mary during her birth. Alex grew up in orphanages, not knowing anything of her real family, until the day that Wren Kingston came into her bar and immediately thought she was Spencer. She clarified her real identity and he revealed Spencer and everything to her. Wren introduced Alex to Charlotte and the two of them formed an immediate bond together, spending every moment with each other until Charlotte left to go back to the U.S. to play the game some more. Alex eventually learned of Charlotte's death and decided to avenge her by becoming Uber A. At first, Alex sent the Liars threats, using only Emojis to sign the texts. However, after kidnapping Hanna, Alex begins using the alias "A.D." to sign off her texts. Alex convincingly masquerades as Spencer multiple times to be with Toby and trick the Liars. After the game ends, Alex goes back to London but returns a year later to kidnap Spencer and take her place, along with Mary and Mona's help. Alex explains herself to Spencer and reveals her entire story, also revealing that she has killed Wren to avoid having to break up with him. She also kidnaps Ezra. Spencer and Ezra escape and Alex is detained. However, Mona manages to kidnap both Alex and Mary and locks them away in her own personal dollhouse in France.
- Melissa Hastings (Torrey DeVitto) (seasons 1–7) is Spencer's older sister, who was engaged to Wren at the start of the series, but later returns to Ian. A perfectionist and the favored daughter, she was Spencer's rival for most of their lives. Their competition led to Spencer kissing both Ian and Wren, which culminated in Melissa breaking off her engagement with Wren. After their breakup, Melissa rekindled her relationship with Ian and the two eloped; after which Melissa confided in Spencer that she just wanted the fighting between them to stop. Shortly after marrying Ian, Melissa becomes pregnant, which again causes a rift between her and Spencer, who suspects Melissa is covering for Ian. When Ian goes missing, Melissa refuses to believe Spencer's claims that he is dead, thinking that she is receiving text messages from Ian, who is in hiding. After the discovery of Ian's body, Melissa becomes depressed and apologizes to Spencer for choosing Ian over her. When Melissa finds Ian's phone in Spencer's bag, (although "A" put the phone in there), she believes it was Spencer sending the texts to her phone and vows she will never forgive Spencer for this. Melissa discovers that Jason is their half-brother and says that she can't be around their parents because they lied to her and Spencer. She still loiters around the house and Spencer and her friends begin to suspect that Melissa knows more about "A" and Ali's disappearance than she is letting on. They find a video taken inside Alison's room the night she disappeared, and Melissa is shown throwing open the door and yelling "where is she?!" The Liars also find out that Melissa was sending Ali threatening text messages, and had worked at a law firm that Ali had suspected of assisting "A" in messing with her life. Spencer and Melissa's father's gun goes missing, and Spencer fears Melissa took it. Even though Melissa didn't take the gun, her parents still feared that she killed Alison through jealousy, so her mother hired a private investigator to watch her. Toward the end of the second season, Melissa makes some odd statements that implies she knows some secrets about Alison and/or the N.A.T. club. Melissa lost her baby after Ian died. In the third-season finale it is revealed that Melissa is working with Jenna and Shana. In the fourth-season premiere it is revealed that she was the Queen of Hearts that drugged Aria on the Halloween train and put her in a box, along with Wilden. Spencer mentions to Melissa that Wilden was blackmailing her to do so, but Melissa never confirms this suspicion. In the fifth season, it is revealed that Melissa is Bethany Young's killer. She saw Spencer carrying a shovel and then found Bethany's body. She wouldn't look her in the face and assumed that it was Alison whom she thought Spencer had killed. She pushed Bethany into the ground and buried her, unaware that she was still alive, thereby killing her. After telling this to Spencer, Melissa flies back to England and it is revealed that she and Wren are seeing each other again.
- Peter Hastings (Nolan North) (seasons 1–7) is the biological father to Spencer, Melissa, and Jason DiLaurentis. A lawyer who places a great emphasis on winning, he destroys evidence that he fears will indicate Spencer's involvement in Alison's murder. Initially he disapproves of Spencer and Toby dating; he warns Toby after he begins to work for him. Peter strongly dislikes the DiLaurentis family, who he claims are "always crossing lines". In Season 2, Episode 19, it is revealed that Peter did have an affair with Jessica DiLaurentis, that he is Jason's father and that Jason, Spencer and Melissa are all half-siblings. He paid a private investigator to look into Ali's disappearance, as he was afraid that Melissa had something to do with it since he found out Melissa had been sending Ali threatening text messages.
- Veronica Hastings (Lesley Fera) (seasons 1–7) is Spencer's and Melissa's mother. She had a breast cancer scare that she kept a secret from her family, not wanting to worry them. A lawyer, she frequently helps the girls out with legal situations. She dislikes Toby and his relationship with Spencer in the beginning, but she eventually becomes more tolerant of it. In Season 3, she defends Garrett after he gets arrested and eventually gets the judge to allow him to walk free.

=== Friends ===
- Andrew Campbell (Brandon W. Jones) (seasons 3–6) is a secretary of the Decathlon team of which Spencer is a member. He and the rest of the team vote to remove Spencer from the team following her loss to Mona in a quiz-off, resulting in her not appearing at practices. Spencer challenged him to a strip version of quiz-off in order to get his vote to keep her on the team. In season five, he starts dating Aria, after he had been tutoring her. Later on the season Andrew becomes dark and shady, leading the Liars to assume that he is in fact "A". However, he turns out to be innocent after he was apprehended by police and released due to evidence proving he isn't "A". He claims that he intended to be the hero and find them after their kidnapping by CeCe Drake.
- Eddie Lamb (Reggie Austin) (seasons 3–5) and (Charles Gray) (Original Sin) is a nurse at Radley Sanitarium. Toby used his name as his alias while he was working with Mona. He return in Original Sin where is now a maintenance manager at the Radley Hotel.

=== Relationships ===
- Toby Cavanaugh (Keegan Allen) (seasons 1–7) is Jenna's stepbrother, who forced him into a physical relationship with her through blackmail, and took the blame for the Liars accidentally blinding Jenna. After he returns to Rosewood, he strikes up a tentative friendship with Emily after saving her from Ben. Spencer disapproves of their friendship, believing that Toby is Alison's murderer. Emily goes to Homecoming with Toby and later confesses to him that she is a lesbian; her openness makes Toby try to confess to her about having a thing with Jenna, which Emily misunderstands, leading to a physical confrontation. Toby drops her off at the hospital before running away; he is later caught by the police, who had been tipped off by Jenna. After witnessing Toby being taunted in the street, Spencer begins to sympathize with him, and they bond even more when they realize they are both being framed for Alison's murder. Despite Spencer's parents distrust and dislike of Toby, they begin to date. After "A" threatens Spencer with Toby's safety, she decides to break up with him, not wanting him to get hurt. Later he gets injured, as a result of "A"'s tricks and ends up in hospital. He later learns that Wren kissed Spencer and had a one-day fling with her. Back in the hospital he tells Wren that he would beat him up if he tried anything like that again. When he is discharged he begins to act cold towards her. In the season 2 finale he admits that pretending not to love her was the hardest thing he has ever done, she then approaches him and gets ready to slap him but before she has a chance he pulls her close to him and kisses her. In season 3, Spencer and Toby seem to have moved past all the problems that plagued their relationship, seeming happier and more in love than they ever were. In the season 3 summer finale, Toby is revealed to be a member of the "A" team. After a while Spencer becomes aware of Toby's affiliation with the "A"-Team and she slaps him, as a response to his betrayal. Her mom then arrives home allowing him the moment he needs to sneak away. Spencer had not seen him since, and became quite bitter and broken from the betrayal. Spencer later finds a body and assumes it is Toby from the tattoo. Mona also tells her that it is his body. Later when Spencer joins the "A" team she finds out that Toby is alive and that he joined "A" team to find out about Red Coat. They go to a motel room together and re-kindle their love for each other. In season 4, Toby learns more information about his late mother. He finds out that she committed suicide at Radley. When Spencer and him go there, there is a long roof that goes around the whole building and Spencer thinks someone may have pushed her and covered it up to make it look like a suicide. Toby talks to his mother's therapist, the one she talked to the day she died. He said for her to stay away from that "blonde girl". It is later learned that the blonde may possibly be CeCe Drake. James Neate plays Toby in the pilot episode.
- Marco Furey (Nicholas Gonzalez) (season 7) is a new detective at the Rosewood Police Department who hooks up with Spencer at the Radley Hotel Bar the night he arrives in town.
- Wren Kingston (Julian Morris) (seasons 1–4, 7) is a medical student who was engaged to Melissa. He was attracted to Spencer and later kissed her, which resulted in Melissa calling off their engagement. However, he later returns to Rosewood to help Melissa out with Ian, who at the time, they believe to still be alive. He obtains a job at the hospital in Rosewood, telling Spencer he came back for her, he then asks her if she wants to go out for a coffee but she says 'I have a boyfriend now', they leave it at that and go. He then comforts Spencer after her breakup with Toby, leaving her confused. After Mona is revealed to be "A", Wren develops a friendship with Hanna, as he volunteers at Radley Sanitarium where Hanna goes to visit Mona there on a regular basis. Eventually, the board at Radley threatens to transfer Mona to New York, and Wren helps Hanna testify to the board and gets her to remain at Radley. Hanna accidentally kisses Wren from happiness when she finds out Mona will not be transferred based on Hanna's testimony. Wren tends to get an unrequited crush on Hanna after the kiss and tries to woo her at times, but gets rejected. Most likely because he's Spencer's ex and she's secretly dating Caleb again. In Season 4, it is implied he knows about Red Coat. He goes with Melissa to London for unknown reasons. In Season 7, it is revealed that he is on the A-Team and an accomplice to "A.D.", who is revealed to be Wren's girlfriend and Spencer's twin sister Alex Drake. He is murdered by her later on.
- Jonny Raymond (Will Bradley) (season 5) is a painter who Spencer met at The Brew. During 5B, he was staying in Hastings' barn until Veronica kicked him out. He kissed Spencer before his departure.
- Alex Santiago (Diego Boneta) (season 1) is an employee of Rosewood's exclusive country club. He meets Spencer after observing her practicing serves, and the two quickly enter into a relationship. Their relationship becomes strained after Melissa plants doubts about Spencer's feelings for him in Alex's mind, leading Alex to think Spencer is using him. Veronica is initially uncomfortable around Alex, which Spencer thinks is because of Alex being of a lower economic class, however, Alex explains that he comforted Veronica after her cancer scare. Alex breaks up with Spencer for good after "A" makes him believe Spencer applied for him to go to Europe for a tennis camp after he asked her explicitly not to.
- Ian Thomas (Ryan Merriman) (seasons 1–2, 4) is Melissa's late husband. He attended high school with Jason and Garrett and was part of their "N.A.T." club (the initials of a Latin phrase meaning "We See All"). Ian dated Melissa prior to Alison's death, although he was secretly having an affair with Alison, he also flirted and tried to get with Spencer, who had a crush on him. He returned to Rosewood shortly after Melissa broke off her engagement with Wren; after a small courtship, the two eloped and took up residency in the Hastings' renovated barn while their apartment in Philadelphia was being renovated. He had an uneasy relationship with Spencer, who became suspicious of him and believed he was Alison's killer. It is later revealed that Ian liked to secretly videotape the girls when they were getting undressed, and other videos such as Jenna threatening Toby to have sex with her. When Spencer confronts Ian about Alison's death, he claims he only pushed her, not intended for her to hit her head. After this he approaches Spencer and tries to kill her, stating that he's doing it for Melissa's benefit, but is killed by "A", who surprisingly intervenes. His body goes missing and he is presumed to be in hiding. However, his body is eventually discovered with his death staged to look like a suicide; leaving Melissa with his unborn child. "A" drops their phone in season 2, and the girls enlist Caleb's help. He finds videos of Ian, Garrett, Jenna, and Melissa in Alison's room that night. He hides the camera and they begin to argue about the videos. In the premiere episode of season 4, Mona reveals that even though she was "A", she was not the one who killed Ian, confessing she doesn't know who did. The person who pushed Ian is revealed to be Alison in the season finale of season 4, though she says she wasn't the killer. Carlo Marks plays Ian in the pilot episode.
- Colin (Oliver Kieran-Jones) (season 5) is Wren and Melissa's flat-mate in London. He kisses Spencer whilst she is visiting Melissa.

=== Other ===
- Yvonne Cavanaugh (née Phillips) (Kara Royster) (season 6–7) is Toby's fiancé and later wife after the five year time jump. She is also the daughter of Kristine Phillips, Veronica Hastings' opponent in the race for Pennsylvania State Senate. She and Toby decide to move out of Rosewood but are in an accident before they get far. After hitting a deer, she and Toby are sent to the hospital and Yvonne is sent into a medically induced coma due to the severity of her injuries. She wakes up from her coma but is still very weak. She accepts Toby's idea that they marry that very day despite her being in the hospital bed. As she and Toby celebrate, they discuss where they want to go for their honeymoon. She tells Toby that she is happy before she breaths her last breath, dropping her flowers in the process and leaving Toby devastated.
- Miles Corwin (Andrew Elvis Miller) (season 3) is a private investigator who is hired by Spencer to keep tabs on Toby once she knew that he was a part of the "A" team. He later discovers "A"'s lair.
- Louis Palmer (Nick Tate) (season 4) was a psychiatrist at Radley Sanitarium. Spencer and Toby visit him to find out what really happened to Toby's mother, Marion. Dr. Palmer end up revealing to Spencer and Toby that Mrs. DiLaurentis had been at Radley.
- Dean Stavros (Nathaniel Buzolic) (season 3, 6) is a drug and alcohol abuse counsellor who is hired by Peter and Veronica Hastings to make sure that Spencer is no longer taking drugs after being discharged from Radley Sanitarium.

== Acquaintances of Hanna Marin ==
The following characters are all family members and acquaintances of Hanna Marin, one of the protagonists of the series.

=== Family ===
- Ashley Marin (Laura Leighton) (seasons 1–7) is Hanna's mother, who worked at a bank in Rosewood and later for Jessica and Jason DiLaurentis. She is angered by Hanna's shoplifting, and has an affair with Detective Darren Wilden in order to keep Hanna from being charged. After some financial hardship caused by the divorce, Ashley falls behind on her bills and resorts to stealing money from the safety deposit box of a client; the money is later stolen (by "A", unbeknownst to Ashley) and Hanna is forced to slowly earn it back by hurting Lucas. Although she is divorced from Tom, Hanna's father, Ashley still has lingering feelings for him; when he comes for a visit, they end up spending the night together. However, she ends the affair when she realizes that Tom will never change. After Emily's parents move to Texas, Ashley invites Emily to come live with her and Hanna. She initially disapproves when Hanna starts dating Caleb, but eventually warms up to him even saying how she sees "herself" in him. In season 3, she begins to date a Pastor named Ted. In season 4, Ashley is framed for Detective Wildens murder by "A", and is arrested. Spencer tells Hanna that she could spend life in prison...or worse. In season five she has a brief affair with Jason DiLaurentis.
- Isabel Marin (Heather Mazur) (seasons 1–2) becomes Hanna's stepmother, after marrying her father, Tom. Isabel and Tom had an affair whilst Tom was still married to Ashley.
- Regina Marin (Betty Buckley) (seasons 2–3) is Hanna's paternal grandmother. She has a distaste towards Isabel and Kate, and would prefer for her son to be with Ashley over Isabel. It is Regina who helps Hanna to discover Kate's sly behaviour.
- Tom Marin (Roark Critchlow) (seasons 1–2, 4–5) is Hanna's father. He divorced Hanna's mother, Ashley, after having an affair with Isabel, his current wife. When he comes to Rosewood to visit Hanna, he begins to grow close to Ashley once more, something which is encouraged by Hanna. Tom eventually sleeps with Ashley, but she breaks things off with him when she realizes that he will never change. His wedding to Isabel is interrupted by Hanna, who reveals his affair with Ashley to Isabel. Despite Hanna ruining Tom's wedding to Isabel, Ashley reveals to Hanna that Tom still married her. Tom later reveals that he will be moving back to Rosewood with Isabel and Kate so he can be closer to Hanna.
- Kate Randall (Natalie Floyd, later Natalie Hall) (seasons 1–2) is Isabel's daughter and Hanna's stepsister. Although Hanna is friendly to Kate at first, she begins to resent her. Kate is shown to possess a malicious streak, with a willingness to use manipulation for her own purposes. Hanna had said some unkind things about Kate, but apologizes to her. Kate pretends to accept the apology, but makes comparisons of how to break in horses and how she would break in Hanna. She humiliates Hanna after getting her drunk at their parents' rehearsal dinner. Even though Hanna stopped Isabel's wedding to her father, Kate still becomes Hanna's stepsister when their parents get married at the courthouse. Tom later moves back to Rosewood with Isabel, and Kate is enrolled at Rosewood High. It appears that Kate actually wants to be friends with Hanna at school, but she was really trying to look like an innocent victim, even sending the school a naked photo of herself and framing Hanna for it. But after finding out the truth, Hanna neutralizes Kate for a time.

=== Friends ===
- Lucas Gottesman (Brendan Robinson) (seasons 1–3, 5–7, and Pretty Dirty Secrets) was an unpopular student at Rosewood, who harbored an unrequited crush on Hanna, with whom he developed a friendship. Having been frequently tormented by Alison, he often expressed his happiness at her death, going so far as to destroy Alison's memorial, believing her cruelty shouldn't have been forgiven posthumously. Although initially angered by Hanna's rejection of his romantic feelings, he eventually accepts it and even befriends Caleb. He seeks Hanna out for dating advice after he becomes involved with a girl named Danielle, however, it is unclear if any relationship developed between them. Soon afterward, due to a series of misunderstandings and coincidences, the Liars suspect Lucas may be "A"'s helper. It is later revealed that Lucas had gambled away thousands of dollars of Caleb's savings. Following this, his friendship with Hanna and Caleb is severely strained, and Lucas grew increasingly more troubled. It was revealed in the third season that he had been visiting Mona at Radley, because she had discovered he was selling test answers and was blackmailing him into working on the A-Team as her personal assistant. He moved away at the end of season 3, out of fear and as a way to start over. Mona soon reveals to the Liars that it was he who gave Emily the massage as "A". He returns to Rosewood in season 5 and begins helping Mona to take down Alison. After Mona's supposed death, Lucas begins helping the girls to stop Alison, who they believe killed Mona. Lucas is not seen after this, but is revealed to have attended prom with Jenna Marshall.

=== Relationships ===
- Sean Ackard (Chuck Hittinger) (season 1) was Hanna's boyfriend prior to the beginning of the series. Having crushed on Sean since before Alison's disappearance, motivated by insecurities about her weight, Hanna puts a lot of pressure on their relationship. When Sean refuses to have sex with Hanna, she becomes upset and wrecks his car, though Sean understands and forgives her. However, the mystery surrounding "A" and Alison's death begin to take a toll on their relationship and that, combined with Sean's treatment of Lucas as well as his attraction to Aria, leads to their breakup. Afterwards, Sean seeks out Emily's help in pursuing Paige, unaware that Paige is a lesbian.
- Jordan Hobart (David Coussins) (season 6–7) is Hanna's fiancé after the time jump. He is described as a sophisticated-yet-approachable 27-year-old working in the fashion industry.
- Travis Hobbs (Luke Kleintank) (seasons 4–5) first appears giving Hanna money in order to help her mother. Hanna then finds out that Travis was a witness to the confrontation between Hanna's mother and Wilden that landed her mother in jail. Two develop a friendship. After Hanna and Caleb break up, Hanna kisses Travis.
- Gabriel Holbrook (Sean Faris) (seasons 4–5) is a Pennsylvania State Police Officer and the detective assigned to Darren Wilden's murder case. Hanna kisses him after he testified for Travis' father in court.
- Caleb Rivers (Tyler Blackburn) (seasons 1–7, Ravenswood) is a Rosewood's resident "bad boy" who Hanna seeks out for help in hacking Emily's phone so that she can call Maya, her girlfriend at the time. Though initially annoyed and frustrated by Caleb, she becomes more sympathetic towards him when she discovers his poor home life as he is in foster care. The two eventually enter into a relationship. When she discovers that Caleb originally tried to get close to her while working for Jenna, she dumps him, feeling betrayed. He is brought back to Rosewood by Lucas, who wants Hanna and Caleb to make amends and reunite. After Caleb is contacted by his birth mother, he leaves Hanna to stay in California for a while. He returns in time for Tom's marriage to Isabel, accompanying Hanna to the wedding. Caleb then comes back after being in California and helps Hanna and her friends hack "A"'s phone without telling him whom the phone belongs to, but it backfires when "A" shuts the phone down. His surprise birthday party later gets ruined because Lucas has something to tell Hanna but Hanna takes it the wrong way and they both end up falling out the boat. The Liars (excluding Hanna) let Caleb continue to hack "A's" phone and, in order to get him to do it, they tell him about "A". The girls try to hide the truth from Hanna but when she finds out she is angry at them but reconciles with them a while later. Meanwhile, Caleb becomes obsessed with finding out who "A" is, which causes "A" to hack into Caleb's computer and plant secure school files, which lands him in trouble with the police. However, Hanna saves him by deleting the files. Caleb is the first person other than the Liars to help figure out who "A" is. Earlier, Lucas has some problems and starts to be a bad boy at school; when he is given a letter to give to his parents he drops it into a bin and sets it on fire. Hanna starts to worry about Lucas so she asks Caleb to talk to him. Later Caleb confronts Lucas and asks him why he nearly set fire to his girlfriend and why he is acting so strange; Lucas says sorry and walks off leaving Caleb wondering. In the third season, Hanna has trouble telling Caleb about what is going on in her life, causing him to break up with her. A couple episodes later it is revealed that they are back together in secret, unable to tell anyone. Caleb promises to help Hanna take down this new "A". In the summer finale, he accompanies the Liars to Ali's grave. Right after Emily's confrontation with Nate/Lyndon, he comforts Emily but is shot by the gun that Caleb put down beside the tower light assuming Nate was dead. He survives the gunshot. After some prodding, Hanna convinces him to meet with his actual father who was portraying himself as Uncle Jamie. They hit it off and Hanna manages to get Caleb's father a job at the church so that he could be near his son. It is hinted that he (Caleb's father) stole money from the church as Hanna notices a bill in his wallet with the same red dice as the one she had donated earlier that day. When he returned the church's bell from repair, it turned out to be a much cheaper version. Hanna tells Caleb about this causing Caleb to break off his new relationship with his father, only for "A" to later reveal it was all a set-up. When Hanna's mom gets framed for Wilden's murder, Caleb teams up with Toby to search for other suspects. He then soon breaks up with Hanna when he's preparing to leave Rosewood to live in his new life in Ravenswood. He returns to Rosewood in season five to help the girls to find new A's identity. Five years later, he's now working in IT and briefly dates Spencer before rekindling his love story with Hanna and marrying her. It is revealed in the end of the series that he got Hanna pregnant. In the sequel, they’re raising their son Aidan together in Rosewood.

=== Other ===
- Jamie Doyle (Bernard Curry) (season 3, Ravenswood) is Caleb's father, who he originally thinks is his uncle.
- Ted Wilson (Edward Kerr) (seasons 3–5, 7) is a priest at the local church in Rosewood. He starts dating Hanna's mom, Ashley. In season 5, they are engaged. In season 7, Hanna and Spencer visits Ted to know if he knows Mary Drake, but he tells the girls that he has never met her. After the girls left, Mary comes out of hiding and asks Ted what the girls want; Ted tells her that he didn't say anything to the girls just like what Mary asked but then asks her why she came to see him. Ted later visits Hanna at Lucas's apartment and tells her that he was hiding Mary and apologizes to her for lying to her about knowing Mary. He reveals to Hanna that he and Mary had met when he was in college but broke up for unknown reasons and reveals to Hanna the real reason why Mary came to visit him; Ted reveals to Hanna that he is Charlotte's biological father and explains that he met her as Charles when he used to work at the camp for troubled children fifteen years prior, but was unaware that Charles was his son and was also not aware that Charles would later transition into Charlotte. After Hanna sees the picture of Ted, Charles and an unknown boy at the camp, she asks him who the other boy is. He tells her that the other boy was Charles's only friend at the camp and tells her that the other boy's name is Lucas. Hanna realizes that the other boy in the picture is Lucas Gottesman.
- Janet (Janet Borrus) (season 1) is Caleb's foster mom who takes the money for taking care of Caleb while he lives elsewhere, surviving off his own money.

== Acquaintances of Emily Fields ==
The following characters are all family members and acquaintances of Emily Fields, one of the protagonists of the series.

=== Family ===
- Pam Fields (Nia Peeples) (seasons 1–7) is Emily's mother. Strict and traditional, she expresses great anger and sadness when she learns that Emily is gay. Believing that Maya corrupted her daughter, she holds a grudge against her, eventually discovering marijuana in Maya's bag and having her sent away. Her relationship with Emily becomes extremely strained after this, but begins to heal when Pam stands up to Paige's father for being homophobic and accusing Emily of getting preferential treatment. For a short time, she moved to Texas to be with her husband, Wayne, eventually returning to Rosewood at the end of season two.
- Wayne Fields (Eric Steinberg) (seasons 1–4) is Emily's father and an officer in the military. At the start of the series, he was stationed in Afghanistan, and when he returned home, Emily came out to him. He struggled to accept Emily's homosexuality at first, but took a liking to Maya after she came over for dinner. After a few weeks of being in Rosewood, he was sent to Fort Hood, Texas to help train new recruits. When Emily was hospitalized after getting an ulcer, he came to visit her, apologizing for pressuring her into getting a swimming scholarship and explaining that he won't mind if Emily gives up on swimming, as long as she is healthy. Near the end of the second season, he is called back to active duty for another tour in Afghanistan. It is later revealed that he was killed in combat during the five-year gap in season 6.

=== Relationships ===
- Ben Coogan (Steven Krueger) (seasons 1–2) is Emily's first boyfriend. Emily breaks up with him after he assaults her in the girls' locker room.
- Samara Cook (Claire Holt) (seasons 1–2) is the president of a local private school's GSA. Upon meeting her, Emily is initially attracted to Samara because she is out, unlike Paige, who Emily was secretly dating at the time. The two date for a short period of time, but Samara states that she does not want to be exclusive, causing Emily to doubt her feelings. After "A" blackmails Emily into giving Samara's friend her phone number, Samara thinks Emily is flirting and ends the relationship when Emily doesn't give her an honest answer.
- Sara Harvey (Dre Davis) (season 3–4, 6–7) is a young girl from Cortland who went missing around the same time as Alison did. Hanna theorized that Sara may have been the one buried in the place of Alison and contacted her friends to visit them. Nothing was heard about Sara after it was revealed that Bethany Young was the person in the grave, but in the sixth-season premiere, it is made known that Sara is alive and being held in "A's" dollhouse, forced to pretend to be Alison. Scared and confused, Sara is rescued by the police and taken to the hospital. Sara told Emily that she ran away from home the night she was taken and was hit over the head. Once she returns home, she runs away again and was living with Emily and her mother for a short period of time before returning home to Cortland to stay with one of her friends so she and Emily could have a real shot at a romantic relationship. Sara shows up at the Rosewood Prom and says that she felt its where she should be. She later travels with the Liars and Mona to the Carissimi Group building and helps the get into "A's" secret room, but waits outside the door on them. However, "A", who is revealed to be CeCe, reveals that Sara was actually Red Coat and the Black Widow, working alongside her. She was the person who got off the plane, meant to be a decoy, and rescued the Liars during the Thornhill Lodge Fire and went to Wilden's funeral to ensure his fate. The Liars see her, dressed as Red Coat, fixing a bomb inside Radley. Emily and the girls show up and confront her about it, disarming the bomb. Sara attempts to run but Emily grabs her and punches her. When Sara tries to get up she accidentally places her hand on an electrical box, severely damaging her hands. Sara is then diagnosed with Stockholm Syndrome after painting Charlotte in a bad image. Five years later, Sara returns to Rosewood after Charlotte is killed and reveals to Alison that she lied to the Judge and was actually very close with Charlotte, considering them to be like "sisters". Sara begins working with Jenna Marshall and they both keep resident at The Radley during their stays in Rosewood. When Noel Khan becomes involved Sara starts to regret her alliance with Jenna. After Sara attempts to warn Emily of the threat of Noel, he shows up to her room and murders Sara when she's trying to escape town and her body is placed in the shower.
- Paige McCullers (Lindsey Shaw) (season 1–5, 7) is a former captain of the high school swim team and the star swimmer in Emily's absence. Jealous of Emily's perceived ease of accomplishments, she makes homophobic remarks towards Emily and physically threatens her. She later apologizes to Emily, stating that she can understand if Emily hates her, because she hates herself. Later, she also apologizes for her father, who causes problems for Emily at school, as he believes Emily is getting preferential treatment for being gay. Paige then kisses Emily, revealing to be gay herself. The two begin an on-again, off-again relationship, which suffers due to Paige's fear of being outed. In season 2, Emily breaks up with Paige after Paige becomes jealous of Samara flirting with Emily. Near the end of the second season, Emily starts hanging out with Paige once more, who has finally come out to her parents. While trying to console Emily, who is upset about Maya's disappearance, Paige tries to kiss Emily, but is rejected. Paige later apologizes and agrees that it's best for the two of them to remain friends. In the third season, Paige and Emily find it hard to remain just friends. Paige confesses to Emily that Emily visited her one evening, and the two shared a drunken kiss. Emily realizes that she wants to move on from Maya's death and rekindles her romance with Paige. When the Liars later suspect Paige of being "A", Emily staunchly defends her, causing a rift between herself and the other Liars. However, once it revealed that Paige was being framed by "A" to look guilty, the Liars reconcile with Emily and accept Paige. At the beginning of season 4, both declare their love for the other reaffirming their commitment. However, by the send of season 4, Emily and Paige's romance appears to be over due to Paige telling the police that Alison is alive and thus breaking Emily's trust in her. In season 5, Paige moves to California with her family, and asks Emily to come with her but she refuses. In season 7, Paige returns to Rosewood from California where she becomes the substitute swim coach for the Rosewood High girls swim team after an injury tarnishes her chances at the Olympics. Emily and Paige briefly rekindle their romance and Paige is there for Emily since she understands the threat of A.D. After discovering that Emily is going to help raise Alison's child, Paige goes to meet Alison. They discuss their years of hatred for each other and their feelings for Emily, both come to a mutual feeling of respect. Paige later ends her relationship with Emily when she sees her true feelings for Alison and realizes that Emily will never love her more than she loves Alison. Paige and Emily tearfully end their relationship for good, and Paige leaves both Emily and Rosewood to move back to California.
- Talia Sandoval-Mendoza (Miranda Rae Mayo) (season 5) is Ezra Fitz's new cook at The Brew. A professional chef, she and Emily initially get off on the wrong foot but eventually form a friendship. Soon, Emily begins receiving mixed signals from Talia, despite her previously commenting on Ezra's "buns". One night Emily and Talia are both working late and Talia reveals that she has feelings for Emily and only mentioned Ezra to find out Emily's sexual orientation. From then on she and Emily begin a relationship and all is well until Emily sees Talia's file, which lists her surname as Mendoza. Talia had previously introduced herself as Talia Sandoval. Curious, Emily asks Ezra about this and he informs her that Talia's maiden name was Sandoval and her married name is Mendoza. Emily confronts Talia about her marriage but she tells Emily that her husband, Eric, is aware that Talia is interested in woman and that they love each other but no longer in that way. In the following episode, a man comes into The Brew looking for Talia and is revealed to be her husband. He tells Emily that he is okay with Emily and Talia having an experimentation with each other because he knows that he will get to love her forever.
- Maya St. Germain (Bianca Lawson) (seasons 1–3) was Emily's first girlfriend and her first love. When Maya's family moves into the DiLaurentis' former house, the two quickly become friends, and their friendship gradually develops into romance. Though their relationship has a rocky start, Maya eventually helps Emily to come to terms with her sexuality. They are broken up by Pam, who discovers marijuana in Maya's bag and as a consequence, her family sent away to "True North," a camp for juvenile delinquents. After returning to Rosewood, Maya and Emily attempted to rekindle their relationship, though their new relationship is shaky. Maya fears that her parents might send her back to "True North" after finding an old joint of hers. She is also afraid of being sent back in part due to her "stalker" (a boy she dated while at True North who had begun to harass her). Maya plans to run away to San Francisco to live with some friends and she attempts to convince Emily to join her, but has no luck. When Maya goes missing and stops responding to Emily's calls, texts, and emails, Emily makes attempts to track her down, but is unsuccessful. At the end of the second season, it is revealed that a body had been found, and they think it's Maya's. Garrett is arrested for Alison's murder, and it is assumed he killed Maya too. In the third season, the Liars discover more about Maya's death with help from Mona, who tells them about Maya's video blog site. The Liars find out she was staying at Noel's cabin, and he hands over security camera footage of the night she disappeared. It shows Maya returning her bicycle and being grabbed by someone off-camera. The day is the same as the day Garrett was arrested, and it was after midnight meaning he did not kill her. Her cousin Nate comes to town, and befriends Emily. Later, he takes her away for a trip near a lighthouse and it is revealed that he was Maya's "stalker-Ex-boyfriend" from True North, and that his real name is Lyndon James. He attempts to kill Paige in revenge for taking Maya away from him, but Emily escapes to the top of the lighthouse leaving Paige behind. They have a brief struggle with Lyndon trying to stab her, but Emily grabs the knife and kills him in self-defense.
- Sabrina (Lulu Brud) (season 6–7) is the manager of The Brew who has been known to dabble with marijuana, though its later revealed this was due to a previous cancer diagnosis. Sabrina and Emily develop a relationship but it is short lived due to Emily being unable to open up to Sabrina about A.D. Complications also grow when Paige returns to Rosewood and rekindles her relationship with Emily. Ezra later informs Emily that Sabrina quit her job at The Brew to move to Atlanta where she got an apprenticeship with an extremely successful baker.

=== Friends ===
- Sydney Driscoll (Chloe Bridges) (season 5, 7) is a member on the Rosewood High Swim Team, having recently transferred schools. She admires Emily and her swimming talent and would like to adapt her style to suit that of Emily's. In the 100th episode, it is revealed that Sydney is in league with Jenna and Mona to take down Alison. When Emily finds out, she tells her that she knew Jenna from when she volunteered at the blind school that Jenna attended prior to season 1. After Mona's death, Sydney and Jenna join Alison, believing she killed Mona and fearing what she would do to them if they opposed her. Sydney returns in Season 7, after the five years forward, and is revealed to be a member of the A-Team. She reveals herself to Aria and claims to be "A.D.", the one in charge of the new team, but is discovered to be their helper instead.
- Nicole Gordon (Rebecca Breeds) (seasons 6–7) is a humanitarian aid worker whom Emily meets whilst in Haiti. After the time jump, it is revealed that she is engaged to Ezra. Whilst in South America with Ezra, she is kidnapped and presumed to be murdered. It is later revealed that she is alive.
- Lyndon James, alias Nate St. Germain (Sterling Sulieman) (season 3) was Maya's stalker. Having met Maya while the two of them were at True North, he was angered after Maya broke off their relationship, and proceeded to harass and stalk her once she returned home and rekindled her relationship with Emily. After Maya's death, while pretending he didn't know she died, he approaches Emily with the intent to befriend and then kill her, assuming the false identity of "Nate", Maya's supposed cousin. After being turned down romantically by Emily, Lyndon subsequently kidnaps Paige and tricks Emily into leaving Rosewood with him, planning on killing Paige in front of Emily as "revenge" for "taking" Maya from him. When Emily attempts to escape, the two get into a physical confrontation which culminates in Emily stabbing Lyndon in self-defense, fatally wounding him, and he dies.

=== Other ===
- Robert Vargas (Joseph Zinsman) (season 4) is a doctor whom Emily visits after injuring her shoulder. He later calls family services due to his worry about the Fields family dynamic.

== Acquaintances of Alison DiLaurentis ==
The following characters are all family members and acquaintances of Alison DiLaurentis, one of the protagonists of the series.

=== Family ===
- Jason DiLaurentis (Parker Bagley) (season 1) and (Drew Van Acker) (seasons 2–7, and Pretty Dirty Secrets) is the half-brother of Alison, Spencer, Alex and Melissa. He had an interesting relationship with his late sister; though they often fought, they were both conniving and willing to keep each other's secrets. Jason attended Rosewood High and was friends with Ian and Garrett, who then later formed a club called "N.A.T" (initials from a Latin phrase which means "We See All"). He revealed to Spencer that Alison blamed the accident where Jenna was blinded on her, though Spencer believes Jason knows this to be a lie. After Ian's death, Jason returns to Rosewood, moving back into his old house and papering up the windows, apparently looking for something that Alison hid. He explains to Aria, whom he has romantic feelings for, that he can't remember what he was doing on the night of Alison's murder and that someone sent him a note afterward with "I know what you did," written on them causing him to fear he might have killed Alison. We later find out that Spencer's father had had an affair with Jason's mother. When Spencer finds this out, she knows something's up, and she looks back on memories. When she remembers Ali telling her weird things on a night when her parents had been fighting about Jason and Melissa kissing, she figures out that Ali had subtly told her about Jason being her half-brother. When she approaches him he confirms her suspicions and they become closer and eventually he lends her $2,000.
- Jessica DiLaurentis (née Drake) (Anne Marie DeLuise, later Andrea Parker) (seasons 1–2, 4–7) is Alison and Jason's mother and Charlotte's adoptive mother. Jessica had an affair with Peter Hastings which produced Jason. In the pilot, she attends Alison's funeral and in the following season she organises a charity fashion show in Alison's memory. She returns in Season 4, and it is revealed that she was the one that buried Alison in order to protect the identity of the person who hit Alison with a rock. In the season four finale, she is killed by an unknown person and buried by "A". In the season five finale, it is revealed that Mrs. DiLaurentis is actually the mother to Big "A", who is named Charles. In season six, it is revealed that Big "A" is CeCe Drake, who was born as Charles but supported by Jessica to transition into Charlotte, despite Kenneth's disapproval. She lied to Kenneth, claiming that Charles died. In the finale, it is revealed that Jessica has a twin sister, named Mary Drake, who is actually Charlotte's biological mother. The DiLaurentis family adopted Charlotte. It is eventually revealed that Mary is the one who killed her after years of abuse from Jessica.
- Kenneth DiLaurentis (Jim Abele) (seasons 3, 5–6) is the biological father of Alison and the legal father of Jason DiLaurentis. He left Rosewood after Alison's disappearance, but returned after Alison was found to be alive.
- CeCe Drake (Vanessa Ray) (seasons 3–7) is an ex-girlfriend of Jason DiLaurentis, who was also friends with Alison. They spent a summer vacation together in Cape May. It seems that CeCe taught Ali her scheming ways, as both act quite similarly. When CeCe returns to Rosewood in Season 3, the girls immediately notice the similarities between the way she acts and how Ali acted. CeCe also learned a lot about the other girls from Alison. She was with Alison and Detective Wilden in Cape May the summer Ali died. It is hinted that she may be scared of Wilden as he was seen in a heated argument with her before she skipped town. In Season 4, it is revealed CeCe was expelled from college, because apparently Alison pushed that girl down the stairs at the frat party shown in Season 1. CeCe believes the other girls were part of it too. In the episode before the fourth midseason finale, it is revealed she's on "The A-Team" and it is revealed she is Red Coat. Aria kicks CeCe in the face, causing her Ali mask to come off. CeCe falls off the railing, and appears to be dead. However, her hand twitches, and her body disappears, meaning she survived the fall. She was taken into police custody where she admits to knowing who killed the girl in Ali's grave and tells them Ali is alive and that she can prove it. Later that night, she escapes and takes a police car. She heads to New York where she asks for Ali's help. It is revealed that Ezra was paying CeCe for information which is why she was in Ravenswood. Ali asked her to wear the Red Coat to distract "A" so she could turn off the saw. Alison gives CeCe her plane ticket and CeCe boards a plane to France, under the alias "Vivian Darkbloom". In "Game Over, Charles", it is revealed that CeCe is actually "A" and was born as Charles DiLaurentis. CeCe was admitted to Radley Sanitarium as a child, after a misinterpreted incident involving Alison as a baby. Their parents told Jason that she was imaginary. It is claimed that Charles committed suicide at age 16 so that CeCe could transition into Charlotte DiLaurentis. Mr. DiLaurentis was unaware of CeCe/Charlotte's existence and Charlotte eventually began dating Jason to get closer the family and became CeCe Drake. CeCe/Charlotte was given privileges to leave Radley to attend the University of Pennsylvania, and one night Bethany stole her clothes and escaped to hurt Mrs. DiLaurentis. CeCe stumbled upon Alison and hit her, believing it was Bethany. Later, CeCe made friends with Mona, who told her all about the "A" game and the Liars, and CeCe offered her a partnership and she helped CeCe escape, where she became "A". Sometime after this, CeCe hired Sara Harvey to become her accomplice by dressing up as Red Coat and The Black Widow. CeCe was also Red Coat, being the one to watch Mona dig up the grave, don the Emily mask and attend the Hoe Down. After declaring game over, Charlotte was admitted to a sanitarium for treatment. Once the Liars discover who she is, she ends the game. Five years later, Alison petitions the court to release Charlotte, asking the girls to testify in her favor. Charlotte is released and brought home to Alison. However, the next morning her body is found, seemingly having jumped from the bell tower, until the police discover that Charlotte was already dead upon "being thrown". In the season six finale, it is revealed that Charlotte was actually adopted and is the actual daughter of Mary Drake, Jessica's twin sister. She was revealed to be killed, in self-defense, by Mona Vanderwaal in season seven.
- Mary Drake (Andrea Parker) (season 4, 6–7) is the twin sister of Jessica DiLaurentis and the birth mother of Charlotte DiLaurentis. She was a patient at Radley Sanitarium, where she gave birth to Charles Drake, but allowed her sister Jessica to adopt Charlotte as a child. Mary's whereabouts after that are unknown but she returns to Rosewood after her daughter's death, where she is working with Elliott Rollins to drive Alison insane and get Charlotte's money. Mary visits Alison in the hospital and pretends to be Jessica, to fool Alison into thinking she is dreaming. She comforts Alison and tells her that Elliott is a good man for her. However, in the next episode, she disguises herself as a deceased Jessica, while Elliott dresses up as Wilden, and together they scare Alison into committing herself into a mental hospital. Mary is also currently the owner of the Lost Woods Resort. It is revealed in season seven that Mary gave birth to a second child while at Radley. In the summer finale, it is revealed that child was Spencer. In the series finale, Mary joins forces with Uber A to kidnap Spencer, after Uber A forces her. Uber A is revealed to be Mary's daughter, Alex Drake, who is Spencer's twin sister.

=== Relationships ===
- Lorenzo Calderon (Travis Winfrey) (season 6) is a police officer that works with Toby. He has shown a liking towards Alison and convinced her to be a coach for a soccer youth group for girls. Alison's dad does not approve of her and Lorenzo, so he takes back the binder Alison was going to use to coach the girls' soccer team.
- Archer Dunhill, alias Elliott Rollins (Huw Collins) (season 6–7) is Charlotte's psychiatrist, and later, Alison's husband. Dr. Rollins knows the relationship with Ali is unusual, that's why he's always thinking of her wellness before taking a decision. In the season six finale, it is revealed that he is actually working with Mary Drake to drive Alison insane and take her half of the Carissimi Group funds. It is revealed in the seventh season that he is not actually Elliott Rollins. His real name is Archer Dunhill and he stole the real, deceased Elliott Rollins' identity. He begins torturing Alison inside Welby and takes her out one night as part of his plan. She manages to escape and while he is chasing her down, the Liars accidentally hit him with their car and kill him. After his death, it is revealed that he is also in league with Jenna Marshall.

=== Friends ===
- Duncan Albert (Lachlan Buchanan) (season 2) was a friend of Alison, when she was using the alias Vivian. When Aria meets him in Brookhaven he explains that he taught Vivian/Alison how to fly a plane, and that he might have loved her if Ian Thomas hadn't been in the way. He didn't know Alison was dead.
- Shana Fring (Aeriél Miranda) (seasons 3–5, and Pretty Dirty Secrets) is a clerk from the Rosewood Halloween Spooktacular Store. She made her first appearance in Pretty Dirty Secrets, a series of mini webisodes. She was reintroduced when Hanna saw Paige talking to her in a lesbian bar. Paige admitted that she had a thing with Shana during the summertime and that she was trying to find information on who bought the Halloween costumes of the people who attacked them on the train from Shana. It was revealed that Shana was the mysterious person that Jenna Marshall was talking to in the finale of season 2 when she met up with her again in the finale of season 3. As of "Close Encounters", she reveals that she is helping Alison and they knew each other since they were kids. In "EscApe From New York", Shana is revealed to have been the "A" who shot Ezra on the rooftop and admits to setting the Lodge on fire. Her motive is that she wants justice for Jenna after Ali blinded her. She almost kills them until Aria intervenes and knocks her off the theater stage to her death. The Liars believed that she was "A" and believed the game to be over, until the real "A" returns. Shana's death affected Aria and Jenna majorly, with the former feeling guilt over killing her.
- Cyrus Petrillo (Jake Weary) (season 5) is a friend of Alison's, whom she paid to falsely admit to kidnapping her.
- Cindy and Mindy (Melanie and Monica Moreno) (seasons 5–6) are twin sisters who attend Rosewood High. The two twins are recruited by Mona to join her army against Alison, as they were bullied by her in the past. When Alison returns to Rosewood, she greets Cindy and Mindy, while Emily and the Liars watch from a distance and Emily reveals that Ali used to call them "Gayrons" (standing for Gay Morons). After Alison and the Liars become enemies, the Liars ally with Mona. The five of them are in the bathroom discussing their plans when Cindy and Mindy enter. Mona greets them but they ignore her and enter the stalls. As soon as the Liars leave, the twins exit the stalls and exchange devious smiles with each other. It is revealed that they have joined forces with Ali. In "How the 'A' Stole Christmas", Ali gives the twins a makeover and they attend the Ice Ball with her, wearing matching (but different colored) dresses. They also dress up as CeCe and Ali, in order to trick the Liars into following them. Cindy and Mindy attend Ali's trial as well. When Ali is ruled as guilty for the murder, Cindy and Mindy stood up in shock, but then began to smile.

=== Other ===
- Hector Lime (Jed Rees) (season 4) is a sculptor who made the original mask of Alison's face. He also created the masks of both Meslissa Hastings and Emily Fields.
- Rebeca Marcus (Lauren Tom) (season 5) is Alison's defence attourney throughout Mona Vanderwaal's murder trial.

== Other characters ==
- Harold Crane (Travis Richley) (seasons 2–3) was the innkeeper of the Lost Woods Resort and later a janitor at Rosewood High School.
- Coach Fulton (Paula Newsome) (season 1, 3) is a swimming coach and gym teacher at Rosewood High School. She tries to sort out the dispute between Paige and Emily.
- Carla Grunwald (Meg Foster) (seasons 4–5, 7 and Ravenswood) is a psychic who lives in Ravenswood. First she denies knowing Alison, but later she admits that Alison had been calling her during the summer before she went missing. In season 5 Hanna asks her for help to search for Mona's body.
- Arthur Hackett (John O'Brien) (seasons 3–5, 7) is the vice principal at Rosewood High. Hackett is reintroduced to the series in the seventh season. He enlists Emily to work as a swimming coach.
- May Horowitz (Cathy Ladman) (seasons 3, 5–7) is a teacher at Rosewood High School, as well as coach of the school's decathlon team.
- Barry Maple (Jim Titus) (seasons 1–7) is a local police officer who is good friends with the parents of Rosewood. In a deleted scene for "Game Over, Charles", it is revealed that Barry actually helped CeCe Drake/"A" escape the night she was detained in "'A' Is for Answers". Barry told CeCe to hit him hard and take the car. CeCe suspects that her mother, Jessica, gave Barry an offer "he couldn't refuse".
- Jenna Marshall (Tammin Sursok) (seasons 1–5, 7) is Toby's younger stepsister. Jenna was accidentally blinded after Alison threw a firecracker into Toby's shed, intending to play a prank on him. At the time, Jenna had been in a physical relationship with Toby (it is later discovered that Jenna had forced Toby into the relationship, threatening to tell their parents he had raped her if he did not). Jenna attended a school for the blind in Philadelphia before returning a year later when Alison's body is found. This leads to conflicts with the girls, who feel guilty about what they did to Jenna, and having let Alison pin the blame on Toby. Prior to Alison's death, she and Jenna had been rivals after Jenna turned down Alison's offer of friendship. Jenna was engaged in a power struggle with Alison before her death; after Jenna's accident, Alison visited her and blackmailed Jenna with the knowledge of her affair with Toby. Jenna claims to know "exactly what kind of person [Alison] really was," hinting that she knows things about Alison that the girls did not. Jenna was a part of the N.A.T. club and later became romantically involved with Garrett Reynolds, as they both worked to "take down" the Liars. However, Jenna eventually breaks up with Garrett, and enters into a relationship with Noel Kahn. In the second season, Jenna undergoes surgery to fix her eyesight, and subsequently lies about the success of the surgery, leading everyone to believe she is still blind. The Liars discover that Jenna can see after Emily remembers being in Jenna's car, leading them to confront her. The Liars agree to keep her sight a secret; however, Jenna then reveals to everyone that she can "now" see. An accidental witness to Lyndon James' kidnapping of Maya, she leaves town after he discovers this. She returns in the Season 3 finale episode. It is then shown that she is in a relationship with Shana, to whom she reveals that her eyesight is getting worse and she will eventually lose her vision again. She is also linked to Melissa and Darren Wilden. In Season 4, it is revealed Melissa ordered Shana and Jenna to go to the lodge to spy on the Liars to see whom they were meeting, and that they didn't start the fire, Wilden did. At Wilden's funeral, she is shown wearing her sunglasses and holding hands with a man. It is revealed that man was a pilot named Nigel Wright, who flew Red Coat the night of the fire. He claims it was CeCe Drake. Later, he is seen making coffee for someone and says he's sorry and that he "screwed up". He also refers to this person as "babe", and she is revealed to be none other than Jenna, as we see Jenna's glasses and cane. Jenna was nearly drowned by "A"/Red Coat at Emily's birthday party. Shana seemed to believe it was CeCe and left town. Jenna returns in the 100th episode where she is revealed to be a part of Mona Vanderwaal's army and is friends with Sydney Driscoll. It is also revealed that Jenna truly cared for Shana. Sydney was volunteering at Jenna's blind school and when Jenna found out that Alison was returning she called Sydney for help. After Mona's supposed death Sydney and Jenna join Ali's army, believing that she was the one who killed Mona and fearing her. Jenna returns to Rosewood after Charlotte DiLaurentis' murder in 2017 and is now working for Uber A, as well working with Noel, Sydney, and Sara Harvey. It is also revealed that she was a part of the A-Team. She reveals that she was actually friends with Charlotte after her admission to Welby and was helping her track down Mary Drake. Jenna also knew Archer Dunhill and was working with him, as well. Jenna and Noel lure the Liars to a blind school to kill them, but their plan fails when Noel is killed and Jenna is knocked out by Mary Drake. Uber A rescues Jenna and takes her to an unknown lair, where she was assisting them in their final endgame. After the one year time jump, Jenna became a Life Skills Teacher at Rosewood High. She met with Alex Drake (who was pretending to be Spencer) and recognized her smell from when she was working for her. She called Toby and informed him that she didn't think Spencer was Spencer, leading them to discover the truth about the twins.
- Rhys Matthews (Caleb Lane) (season 6) is an employee at the Carissimi Group whom CeCe Drake hired to be a decoy for the Liars.
- James Neilan (Charles Carpenter) (season 5) is a lawyer who was involved in Mona Vanderwaal's estate after her death. Mona had asked him to deliver a package to Aria, Emily, Hanna and Spencer upon her death.
- Logan Reed (Tilky Jones) (seasons 1–2) is a delivery driver that is hired by Ian Thomas to deliver the bribe the girls had forced him to pay in order to keep his relationship with Alison a secret.
- Garrett Reynolds (Yani Gellman) (seasons 1–3, and Pretty Dirty Secrets) is a police officer investigating the case of Alison DiLaurentis' death, who is initially assigned to trail Spencer, a suspect in Alison's death. Although he appears to be sympathetic towards the girls, in reality he is secretly dating and in an alliance with Jenna Marshall. He was a member of N.A.T along with Jason and Ian, whom he went to high school with. Garrett and Jenna broke up. Aria and Spencer see Garrett watching them after they talk to the guy who Alison owed money to prior to her murder. Garrett then gets arrested for Alison's murder in front of Melissa. Later in season 3, Garrett is willing to tell Spencer everything he knows and tells her he will leave town right after. As he begins to tell her, they get interrupted. Aria is then seen trapped in a box, next to Garrett's dead body.
- Mr. Sheldrake (Keith Pillow) (season 1) is the AP Russian History teacher at Rosewood High School who submits Spencer's essay, which she stole from Melissa, into the Golden Orchid essay competition, which she wins.
- Douglas Sirk (Christopher Grove) (season 5) was the Chief Prosecutor in Mona Vanderwaal's murder trial, in which Alison DiLaurentis was the defendant.
- Lesli Stone (Elizabeth McLaughlin) (seasons 5–6) is a friend of Mona Vanderwaal's who meets up with Aria, Emily, Hanna and Spencer after Mona's death. It is later discovered that she is a friend of Mona's from Radley Sanitarium, and that she also knew Bethany Young and Charlotte DiLaurentis form her time at Radley.
- Anne Sullivan (Annabeth Gish) (seasons 2–3, 6, and Summer School) is a therapist whom the girls are forced to see to deal with Alison's death. She is visited by A and attempts to reveal A's identity to the girls; A subsequently finds a way to keep her quiet. She returns once Mona ("A") has been caught and explains that Mona threatened the life of her son to get her to disappear. She then is the one to explain Mona's mental issues to the girls in the jail before Mona is put in a mental facility. She returns in season 3, relocating in Rosewood. She still helps the girls when they have problems, such as talking to Spencer when she was in Radley. She returns in Summer School to help the new Little Liars heal from the Millwood Massacre committed by Archie Waters. It is also revealed that she treated Rose Waters in the Radley Sanitarium and had encountered young Archie. In 2016, her son was murdered by Archie.
- Mr. Tamborelli (John Marshall Jones) (season 2) is the Vice Principal at Rosewood High School. He mediates the dispute between Kate and Hanna, and their mothers, and is also the reason that Emily is not allowed back on the swim team.
- Linda Tanner (Roma Maffia) (seasons 4–7) is a lieutenant working with state investigator Gabriel Holbrook in Rosewood, Pennsylvania. Lieutenant Tanner is assigned to Darren Wilden's murder case. She is later assigned to other cases.
- Mrs. Welch (Jill Holden) (seasons 1–2) is an English teacher at Rosewood High School.
- Darren Wilden (Bryce Johnson) (seasons 1–4, 6) was a detective investigating Alison's murder. He is attracted to Hanna's mom, Ashley, whom he once drove home after she had been drinking and asked for a ride, later having sex with her to make up for not charging Hanna, who was caught shoplifting. He is distrustful of the girls, frequently questioning them beyond normal means, such as when he humiliates Emily by outing her to her friends. The detective returns in season 2 episode 12, when the girls are arrested. Officer Reynolds suggests there could be a raise in this for him, as he had his suspicions of the girls to start with. He reveals to them that he knew the murder weapon all along, and the girls had just been caught with it. He had strong feelings towards them all especially Hanna, and was determined that they would be thrown into jail. The girls are very grateful for Spencer's mom for getting them out of it and landing them with community service. When Ashley begins to worry that someone is still trying to get to her daughter, she goes to Darren for help, asking him if he had anything to do with Hanna's police report being released. Darren says that information could get him fired, and he didn't release the report. The Liars find a picture of Wilden, CeCe, and Alison on his boat in Cape May the Summer Ali died. They think Wilden is the father of Alison's alleged baby. Later, Wilden confronts Ashley and when he reaches for his gun, she hits him with her car and flees the scene. When she returns with Hanna, his body is missing. His car was later found in Hanna's garage and she takes it to the lake and dumps it. In the season 4 premiere, Wilden was killed and his body was found next to his car. Also, it was revealed that he is one of the people dressed as the Queen of Hearts in the Halloween episode "This Is a Dark Ride" along with Melissa Hastings. The town believed that Ashley was responsible for the murder, but in the season 4 finale, it was revealed that CeCe Drake was responsible for Wilden's murder. It has been revealed that Wilden helped cover up for CeCe the night she escaped Radley and hit Ali. He was also responsible for the murder of Garrett Reynolds.
- Nigel Wright (Wyatt Nash) (season 4) was Jenna Marshall's boyfriend, who accompanies her to Darren Wilden's funeral. Later, Caleb and Toby discover that he was at Thornhill Lodge on the night of the fire.

== See also ==
- List of Pretty Little Liars episodes
