= Scott Haze =

American actor (born 1980)

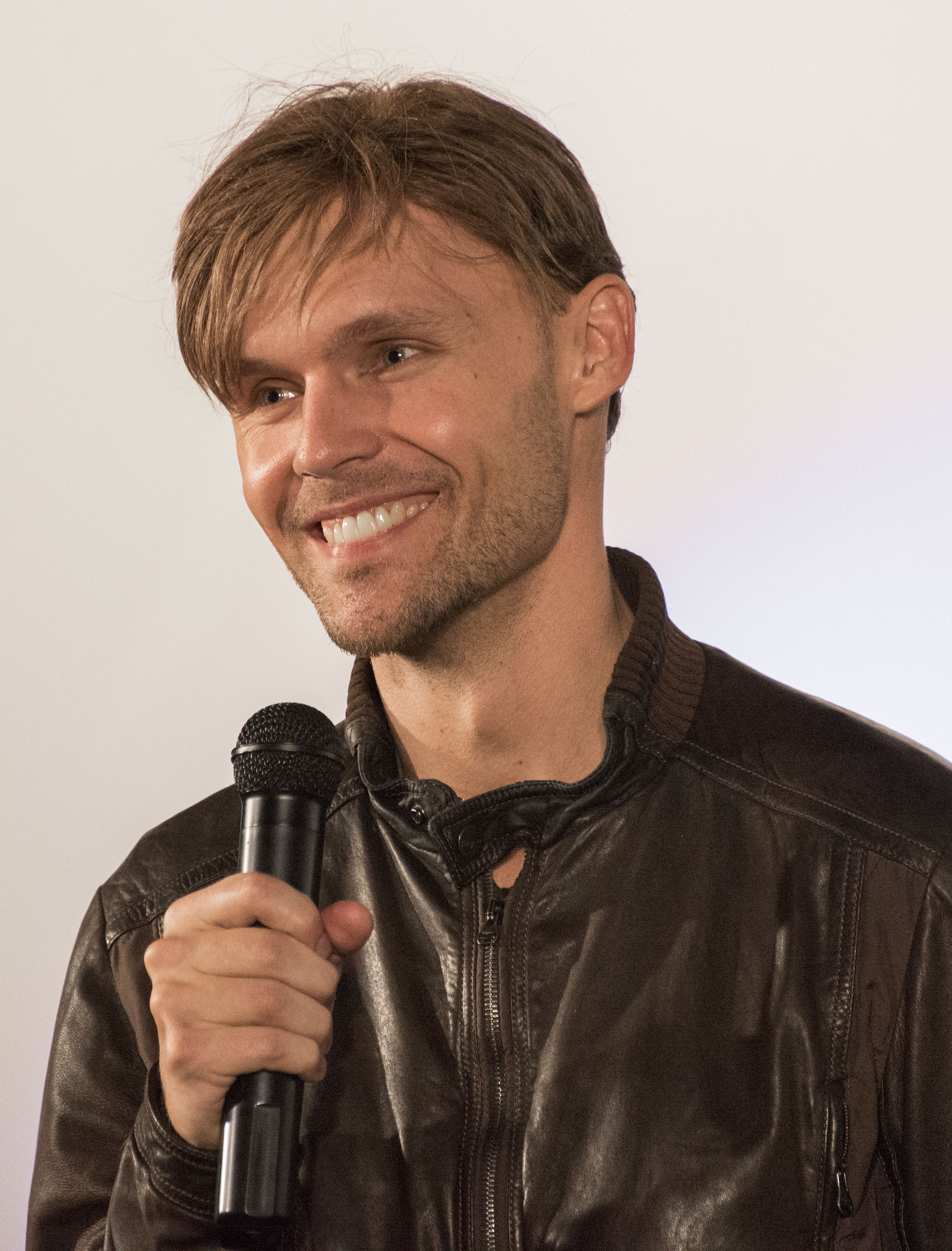
- Haze at the New York Film Critics Series première of Child of God, July 2014
- Born: December 30, 1980 (age 45); Dallas, Texas, U.S.
- Occupations: Actor; producer; writer; director
- Years active: 2005–present

Scott Haze (born December 30, 1980) is an American actor. He is known for his role in the 2013 film Child of God, as well as Thank You for Your Service (2017), the 2021 western Old Henry, and others. He also directed Mully (2015), a documentary on the African humanitarian Charles Mully.

== Early life and education ==
Haze was born in Dallas. He is an alumnus of the Stella Adler Studio of Acting(formerly known as the Stella Adler Conservatory) and Playhouse West, which was founded by Robert Carnegie and Sanford Meisner.

== Career ==
=== Theater ===
In 2006, Haze envisioned, built, and founded The Sherry Theater in the North Hollywood Arts District in California, naming the theater after his mother. Plays written by Haze include 2006's Devil's Night and 2011's Angel Asylum, both of which he acted in as well as directed.

Haze made his New York stage debut on July 13, 2017, in the Rattlestick Playwrights Theatre's production of Robert Boswell's The Long Shrift, directed by close friend James Franco. The play also starred Ahna O'Reilly, Brian Lally, Allie Gallerani, and Ally Sheedy.

=== Film ===
Between 2006 and 2010, Haze starred in several films and television shows including CSI: Crime Scene Investigation, Live!, Prey For Me, Tunnel Vision, and Cop Dog.

In 2011, Haze received critical acclaim for his role of Sgt. Scotty Fowlkes in Post, the directorial debut by Jim Parrack.

Haze first collaborated with close friend James Franco in 2011 on Rebel, a multimedia art piece Franco created with a series of other filmmakers and artists including Ed Ruscha and Paul McCarthy, Turner Prize-winner Douglas Gordon, paint-by-motorcycle artist Aaron Young, fashion photographer Terry Richardson, and filmmaker Harmony Korine. Haze worked with Franco in the section titled Brad Forever, a documentary piece on actor Brad Renfro.

In September 2011, Franco announced at the Toronto International Film Festival that he was set to direct and adaptation of Cormac McCarthy's novel Child of God, the story of Lester Ballard, "a young man who becomes ostracized from society and falls into a life of crime and sexual depravity while living in a cave in Tennessee." In January 2012, Haze had signed on to play that lead role of Lester Ballard. Haze worked on the role of Ballard for a year prior to filming and actually moved to Sevierville, Tennessee, where the Cormac McCarthy novel is set. In preparation for the role, Haze lost 45 pounds, lived in caves and stayed in character for months before and during filming.

Haze starred in As I Lay Dying, James Franco's adaptation of the William Faulkner novel, as Skeet McGowan, "a conniving drug store clerk." The film premiered at the 2013 Cannes Film Festival in the Un Certain Regard section.

In 2013 Child of God made its premiere in official competition at the 70th Venice International Film Festival and official selection of the 2013 Toronto International Film Festival. Child of God was an Official selection of the 51st New York Film Festival and the 2013 Austin Film Festival. The film screened at the Dallas International Film Festival and the San Francisco International Film Festival in 2014. Child of God was released theatrically by Well Go USA on August 1, 2014.

Haze was named one of Variety's 10 Actors To Watch For 2013. For his performance in Child Of God, Haze was also award the Breakthrough Performer Of The Year at the 2013 Hamptons International Film Festival.

He starred Franco's adaptation of William Faulkner's novel The Sound and the Fury as Jason Compson IV. The film co-starred Franco, Ahna O'Reilly, and Tim Blake Nelson. The Sound and the Fury made its premiered at the 71st Venice Film Festival on September 5, 2014. The film had its North American premiere at the 2014 Toronto International Film Festival, and screened at the Austin Film Festival and Virginia Film Festival, in October and November 2014.

Haze had a cameo as serial killer Charles Manson in the 2018 adaptation of Steven Erikson's novel Zeroville, which is directed by and stars Franco alongside Seth Rogen, Megan Fox, Jacki Weaver and Will Ferrell.

In June 2015, Haze joined the cast of The Force, later re-titled Between Us, a romantic drama written and directed by Rafael Palacio Illingworth. The film also stars Olivia Thirlby, Ben Feldman, Adam Goldberg, Analeigh Tipton, Peter Bogdanovich, and Betsy Brandt. The film made its premiere on 18 April 2016 at the Tribeca Film Festival and was released theatrically on January 6, 2017.

Haze's directorial debut Mully made its world premiere on November 1, 2015, at The Austin Film Festival. In 2016, Mully won the Grand Jury Prize for Best Film at the Winnipeg Real to Reel Film Festival. The film was awarded The Man In The Mirror Awards at the 2017 Bentonville Film Festival.

Haze starred as Levi in the Warner Bros. film Midnight Special. The film, written and directed by Jeff Nichols, also stars Michael Shannon, Joel Edgerton, Kirsten Dunst, Adam Driver and Sam Shepard. In February 2016 Midnight Special made its world premiere at the Berlin Film Festival to positive reviews.

Haze teamed with James Franco on his directorial adaptation of John Steinbeck's In Dubious Battle. The film also stars Vincent D'Onofrio, Robert Duvall, Ed Harris, Bryan Cranston and Sam Shepard. The film made its world premiere at the 2016 Venice Film Festival and its North American premiere at the 2016 Toronto International Film Festival. The film was released in cinemas on February 17, 2017.

Haze co-starred opposite Miles Teller in Thank You for Your Service, the directorial debut of American Sniper scribe, Jason Dean Hall. Haze plays a wounded soldier; to prepare for the role, Haze spent time at the VA hospital with veteran Michael Adam Emory, whom he plays in the film, and stayed in character while on set of the film.

Haze re-teamed with his Thank You For Your Service co-star Teller on No Exit, later re-titled, Only the Brave. The film follows "the true story of a group of firefighters known as the Granite Mountain Hotshots, who lost 19 crew members as they faced one of the deadliest wildfires in history in order to save an Arizona town." Haze plays Clayton Whitted, a firefighter and pastor. The film also stars Josh Brolin, Jennifer Connelly, Jeff Bridges, Taylor Kitsch, and James Badge Dale, and is directed by Joseph Kosinski. The film was released by Sony Pictures on October 20, 2017.

In April 2017, it was announced that Haze had signed with Creative Artists Agency.

Fathom Events released Haze's directorial debut, Mully, for a three-day special theatrical event on October 3, 4, and 5, 2017.

Haze co-starred as Roland Treece in Venom. The film, directed by Ruben Fleischer, also stars Tom Hardy, Michelle Williams, Riz Ahmed and Jenny Slate, and was released on October 5, 2018.

== Filmography ==
Key
†	Denotes works that have not yet been released

=== Film ===
Year	Title	Role	Notes
2005	Ad Corp. Inc	Jason	
2006	Danny Roane: First Time Director	Rehab Patient	
2006	Division III	Andre "AO" O'brien	
2007	Live!	Kafiya	
2007	Prey 4 Me	Joel	
2008	Cop Dog	Lukas	
2011	Post	Sgt. Scotty Fowlkes	
2011	Tunnel Vision	Jolson	
2012	The Taste of Copper	Daniel	
2013	Deserted	C. Grin	
2013	Filandra	Scott Haze	
2013	Paradise	Nickel	
2013	As I Lay Dying	Skeet MacGowan	
2013	Child of God	Lester Ballard	
2014	The Sound and the Fury	Jason Compson IV	
2016	Midnight Special	Levi	
2016	Between Us	Robert	
2016	In Dubious Battle	Frank	
2017	The Institute	Gunther	
2017	Actors Anonymous	Sean	
2017	Tenn	Jim Connor	
2017	The Vault	Michael Dillon	
2017	Thank You for Your Service	Michael Adam Emory	
2017	Only the Brave	Clayton Whitted	
2018	Future World	Gutter	
2018	Venom	Roland Treece	
2019	Zeroville	Charles	
2019	Why Not Choose Love: A Mary Pickford Manifesto	Charlie Chaplin	
2020	Minari	Billy	
2021	Wild Indian	Father Daniels	
2021	12 Mighty Orphans	Rodney Kidd	
2021	What Josiah Saw	Thomas Graham	
2021	Old Henry	Curry	
2021	Antlers	Frank Weaver	
2022	Jurassic World Dominion	Rainn Delacourt	
2023	Sound of Freedom	Chris	
2023	The Seeding	Wyndham Stone	
2024	Red Right Hand	Finney	
2024	Horizon: An American Saga – Chapter 1	Elias Janney	
2024	Horizon: An American Saga – Chapter 2	Elias Janney	
2026	Found Alive †	TBA	
TBA	The Prince †	Parker	Filming

Key
†	Denotes films that have not yet been released

=== Directing ===
Year	Title	Type	Notes
2011	The Vanya Show	Series	
2013	Ghosts & Goblins	Documentary	
2015	Mully	Documentary	Premiered in Official Competition at Austin Film Festival where it won the Audience Award; Screened in Official Competition at Virginia Film Festival where it won the Best Documentary Feature Programmers Award; Screened in Official Competition at Winnipeg Real to Reel Film Festival where it won the Best Feature Film Award.

=== Television ===
Year	TV Show	Role	Appearance
2011	CSI: Crime Scene Investigation	Anthony Steel	"The List"
2011	The Vanya Show	Ego	"Interview Exclusive Pt. 1"

=== Playwright ===
Year	Play	Theater
2002	Leatherman	
2004	Title Fight	Premiered April 2004, Stella Adler Theater, Hollywood, California
2006	Devil's Night	Premiered March 2006, Sherry Theater, North Hollywood, California
2007	Valentines Night	Premiered April 2007, Sherry Theater, North Hollywood, California
2011	Angel Asylum	Premiered October 2011, Sherry Theater, North Hollywood, California
