= Alex Andreas =

Alex Andreas may refer to:

- Alex Andreas (English actor)
- Alex Andreas (Australian actor)
