= Charles Mulli =

Kenyan businessman

Dr. Charles Mutua Mullí
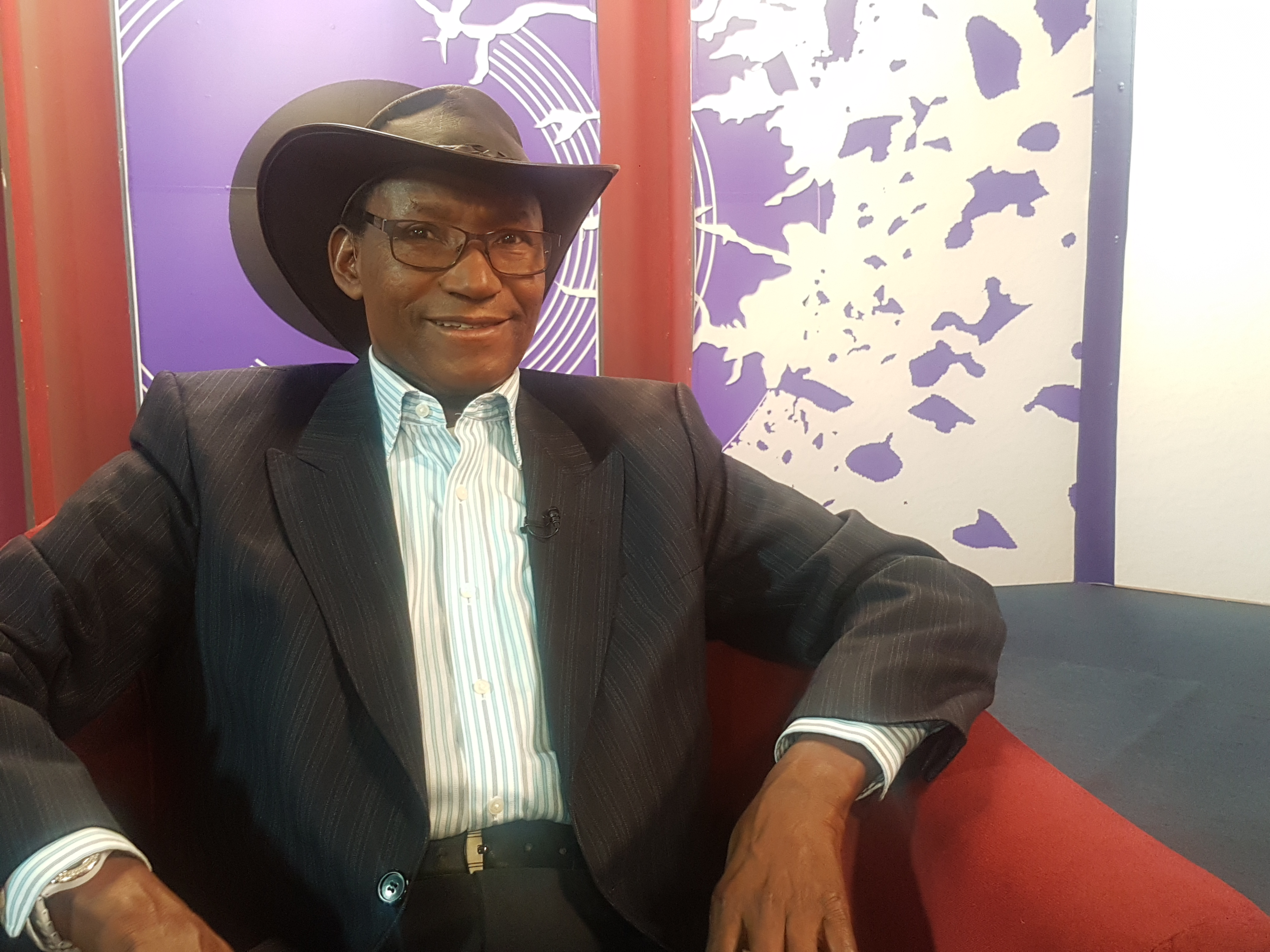
- Charles Mully in 2018
- Born: January 7, 1949 (age 77); Kathithyamaa, Kangundo, Machakos, Kenya
- Occupation: Philanthropist
- Years active: 1949–present
- Spouse: Esther Nthenya Mully
- Children: 8

Charles Mutua Mully (born January 7, 1949) is the founder and chief executive officer of Mully Children's Family (MCF), a Christian, non-governmental organization based in Kenya that works with disadvantaged populations. Mully is the subject of the documentary film Mully, directed by Scott Haze, which was released in October 2017.

== Early life and family ==
Charles Mutua Mully was born in 1949 in Kathithyamaa Village in Kangundo, Machakos, Kenya. Abandoned by his family at age six, he spent his adolescence begging on the streets. Mulli attended the Kyamulendu and Kathithyamaa schools in Kangundo, Machakos. Completing his primary education in 1966, he was unable to enter secondary school because he could not afford it. At age 17, Mulli converted to Christianity after walking into a church and going through an experience that he believed had allowed him to attain salvation. Mulli walked 70 kilometres (43 mi) to Nairobi in search of employment. He found work at a private home where his duties included tilling the garden, washing clothes, cooking in the kitchen, and other domestic chores. A year later, Mulli was promoted to a farm assistant and transferred to Kakuzi Farm in Thika where he met his future wife, Esther Nthenya. They married on 22 December 1970, and had eight biological children.

== Career and education ==
In 1970, Mulli began working at Strabag Road Construction Company where he oversaw the company's supplies. He remained with the company until 1972. With the money he earned working for Strabag, Mulli bought a vehicle and began operating a public transport service running between Eldoret and Nyaru. He also began engaging in agricultural business ventures.

Mulli founded the Mullyways Agencies, a transportation business conglomerate, in the 1970s, gaining assets valued in millions of shillings. He also served as chairman of the boards for several international schools in Kenya between 1970 and 1991, which included Kessup Girls Schools, Kaptagat Preparatory School and Chebisaas High School.

In 1989, Mulli sold all his property and businesses, and dedicated the proceeds to helping street children through rescue, shelter, medical care, psychosocial support, and education. Currently, Mully Children's Family has more than 6,000 children in their centers in Ndalani, Yatta, Kitale, Kilifi, Lodwar and Dar es Salaam in Tanzania. Since 1989, Charles and Esther Mulli have taken in more than 26,000 abandoned children.

In 2009, Mully was awarded an honorary doctorate in humanities by the United Graduate College and Seminary. In 2011, he was awarded an honorary doctorate in Social Work from Kabarak University. In 2019, an honorary Doctor of Science degree award of McGill University – Montreal Canada, in Agriculture and Environment Sciences.

== Philanthropy ==
Mully's philanthropy has been recognized with awards by several organizations including: Robert W. Pierce Award (1999), World Vision International (Angel of Hope in 2002), The Jubilee Insurance Company Samaritan's Award (2007), Med Assets International USA (2008), Head of State Commendation of the Republic of Kenya (2009), and United Nations Environment Programme (UNEP) in 2010. In 2012, Mulli received the Family Philanthropy Award from the East African Grant Makers Association in recognition of his contribution to philanthropic work and its impact in initiating sustainable projects. In 2014, he received an award in education at the Transform Kenya Awards.

== Media ==
Mully is the author of My Journey of Faith and the subject of Christian Heroes: Then and Now – Charles Mulli: We are Family, and also the subject of two other biographies and a children's book written by Paul H. Boge: Father to The Fatherless, Hope for The Hopeless, and The Biggest Family In The World.

In 2014, actor and filmmaker Scott Haze, along with Lukas Behnken and Elissa Shay and funded by Bardis Productions (John Bardis), traveled to MCF to document the story in film. Through re-enactments, historical and home footage, and present day interviews, the Mulli's story was told in the documentary, Mully. After various showings at film festivals around the nation, in 2016 For Good, LLC picked up the film for distribution, and after partnering with Focus on the Family and Fathom Events, announced a three-day special event in 700-800 theaters on 3, 4 and 5 October 2017. Starting the end of May 2019, Mully became available to watch for free for a limited time on Catalyst Movies. Beginning in February 2021, Mully became available to watch for free at MullyMovie.com.

== Mully Children's Family ==
Mully Children's Family (MCF) is a Christian charitable organization working with disadvantaged children and young adults.

MCF has designed its services along the lines of social entrepreneurship by investing in income generating activities to sustainably fund and scale up charity work. It integrates child rescue, rehabilitation and reintegration while creating safety nets in the community to provide an environment conducive for child survival.

=== Program areas ===
There are ten areas of intervention: child protection, education and life skills, future leaders program, health care, food security and agriculture, socio-economic empowerment, water and sanitation, promotion of social justice, climate change mitigation and partnerships.

Child protection using holistic transformational development provides children with a home fit for human habitation, growth and development. This includes rescue, rehabilitation and reintegration, psychosocial support, and a sense of community.

MCF offers a range of educational opportunities and experiences to children and youths of varied ages, backgrounds, interests and needs such as mentorship and coaching, vocational training, and kindergarten through college-level educational opportunity.

The future leaders program provides youth mentoring and coaching teaching leadership and entrepreneurial skills through student internships, peer counselor training, and a volunteer program.

MCF offers health care programs including free medical care, comprehensive HIV/AIDS treatment, and free medical camps.

The charity works to provide children and communities they serve with sufficient, safe and nutritious food to meet their dietary needs. It offers comprehensive nutritional care for children, a school feeding program, dryland farming, emergency relief food distribution, water harvesting/conservation for irrigation farming, distribution of milk goats to communities, livestock farming. and globally certified produce for export.

MCF creates job opportunities for women and youth.

The organization improves access to clean water and sanitation through water harvesting, conservation and distribution, and construction of pit latrines.

MCF enhances access to justice for children, women and the vulnerable in the society through child/gender protection training, the establishment of child/gender protection units/desks in police stations, child rights education and school mentorship programs, community education initiatives, and participation in policy formulation and implementation.

MCF promotes environmental conservation and the use of renewable energy as a means to mitigate the effects of climate change with activities such as tree planting and environmental conservation campaigns, promotion of green energy initiatives, water harvesting and conservation for dryland farming, and Adopt-a-Tree campaigns among children and youth in schools.

The charity works with government and individuals/organizations to support programs, initiate services, and replicate best practices in child care, food security, climate change, community empowerment, and entrepreneurial income generating activities.
