= King of Thieves (soundtrack) =

King of Thieves (Original Motion Picture Soundtrack)

Film score by Benjamin Wallfisch
- Released: 14 September 2018
- Studio: Abbey Road Studios, London
- Genre: Film score
- Length: 42:15
- Label: Milan
- Producer: Benjamin Wallfisch

Benjamin Wallfisch chronology
The Darkest Minds (2018)	King of Thieves (2018)	The Vanishing (2018)

King of Thieves (Original Motion Picture Soundtrack) is the film score to the 2018 film King of Thieves directed by James Marsh, starring Michael Caine, Tom Courtenay, Michael Gambon, Charlie Cox, Jim Broadbent, Paul Whitehouse and Ray Winstone. The film score is composed by Benjamin Wallfisch and released through Milan Records on 14 September 2018.

== Background ==
Benjamin Wallfisch composed the film score. He recorded it at the Abbey Road Studios. Having fascinated with jazz music since his childhood, Wallfisch found it a perfect chance to execute his jazz improvisations as he worked more in orchestral and electronic stuff in film music. Through this film, he wanted to give the ex-criminals making them feel young with the help of music. He cited Quincy Jones, Henry Mancini, John Barry and Lalo Schifrin as the influence for the score. Wallfisch worked with Chris Egan who arranged the score as well as contacting with several notable jazz musicians in London for the big band to perform the score. The use of cimbalom was the common sound for the score, an instrument prominent in jazz-based scores.

Singer-songwriter Jamie Cullum recorded a new version of the 2017 song "The Man" by the Killers. The soundtrack was released through Milan Records on 14 September 2018.

== Track listing ==
No.	Title	Length
1.	"Reader's Theme"	1:16
2.	"The Scheme"	1:58
3.	"Diamond Education"	2:07
4.	"What About My Privacy?"	2:27
5.	"Load In"	2:57
6.	"Blinking Red Light"	1:44
7.	"Night at Hatton Garden"	4:19
8.	"Sugar Plum Raid"	2:08
9.	"The Morning After the Night Before"	3:41
10.	"Train Escape"	2:01
11.	"Where's Basil"	4:36
12.	"Tracking the Lads"	1:12
13.	"I'm the Guv Now"	3:55
14.	"Police Sting"	1:44
15.	"Reader Arrested"	2:55
16.	"King of Thieves"	3:15
Total length:		42:15

== Reception ==
A reviewer from London Jazz News called it "Great, highly-polished stuff, but still odd." Anton Smit of Soundtrack World wrote "The album is not long: it is only 42 minutes, but in this short time there is not much that is not pleasant to listen to." Stephen Dalton of The Hollywood Reporter called it a "retro-flavored soundtrack, which blends a jazzy pastiche score with vintage jukebox hits". Guy Lodge of Variety called it a "dandy electro-jazz score". Simran Hans of The Guardian wrote "Not even Benjamin Wallfisch’s jaunty score can keep things moving." Tim Robey of The Daily Telegraph noted that the film "needs a lot of help from Benjamin Wallfisch’s jazzy score to stay on its feet at all." Chris Bumbray of JoBlo.com called it a "wall-to-wall score".

== Personnel ==
Credits adapted from liner notes:

- Music composer – Benjamin Wallfisch
- Music producers – Benjamin Wallfisch, Christopher Egan
- Arrangements – Benjamin Wallfisch, Christopher Egan, Andrew Cooksley, Jared Fry
- Programming – Andrew Cooksley, Jared Fry
- Assistant engineer – George Oulton
- Recording – Jake Jackson
- Pro-tools recordist – Toby 'Sharky' Hulbert
- Mixing – Jake Jackson, Trystan Francis
- Mastering – Rob Kleiner
- Music editor – Robin Baynton
- Music coordinator – Darrell Alexander
- Copyist – Jill Streater
- Graphic design and layout – Shawn Lyon
- Liner notes – James Marsh
- Executive producer – JC Chamboredon, Stefan Karrer
- Production manager – Pablo Manyer

Orchestra

- Orchestra – Chamber Orchestra of London
- Orchestrators – Christopher Egan, David Krystal
- Concertmaster – Laura Samuel
- Orchestra contractor – Gareth Griffiths

Instruments

- Acoustic bass – Chris Hill
- Alto flute – Andy Findon, Gareth Lockrane
- Cimbalom – Edward Cervenka
- Drums – Ralph Salmins
- Electric bass – Phil Mullford
- Guitar – Adam Goldsmith
- Keyboards – Christopher Egan
- Saxophone – Jamie Talbot, Martin Williams, Nick Moss, Sammy Mayne
- Trombone – Alistair White, Andy Wood, Mark Nightingale, Richard Wigley
- Trumpet – Craig Wild, Pat White, Simon Gardner, Tom Rees Roberts
- Tuba – Martin Williams

== Accolades ==
Award	Category	Recipient(s) and nominee(s)	Result	Ref.
International Film Music Critics Association	Best Original Score for an Action/Adventure/Thriller Film	Benjamin Wallfisch	Won	
World Soundtrack Awards	Soundtrack Composer of the Year	Benjamin Wallfisch	Nominated	
