= Temara (disambiguation) =

Temara is a city in Morocco. Temara may also refer to

- Temara (name)
- US Temara, a Moroccan football club
- WS Témara, a Moroccan football club
- Temara interrogation centre, an extrajudicial detainment and secret prison facility in Rabat, Morocco
- Skhirate-Témara Prefecture in Morocco
