= Rachel John =

British actress (born 1980)

- Born: 12 October 1980 (age 45); Hackney, East London
- Education: University of Roehampton
- Occupations: Actress, singer
- Website: http://www.rachel-john.com

Rachel John (born 12 October 1980) is a British actress, best known for her work in musical theatre, notably for originating the role of Angelica Schuyler in Hamilton in the West End.

== Personal life and education ==
John was born in Hackney, East London, in 1980 and grew up in Walthamstow. She is of Trinidadian descent; her mother arrived in England in her 20s to work for the NHS.

She is a graduate of the University of Roehampton.

== Career ==
=== Musical theatre ===
John made her West End debut in 2005 in The Lion King as a swing and understudy for Shenzi.

In 2014 she joined the cast of Memphis as the alternate Felicia. She took over the role full-time for a whole two weeks of the run.

In 2016, she played the role of Nicki Marron in The Bodyguard during its limited return West End engagement, alongside Beverley Knight as Rachel Marron. John also played the role of Rachel Marron at certain performances, despite not being listed as an official understudy. She then moved with the production to the Ed Mirvish Theatre, Toronto for a limited season.

From November 2017 until she left in December 2018, she played Angelica Schuyler in the West End production of Hamilton, role which she originated in the UK. For this role she was nominated for an Olivier Award and a Black British Theatre Award.

John then joined the cast of Girl From the North Country in 2019, when the show moved to the Gielgud Theatre for a limited 8-week run. She played the character of Mrs Nielsen in the show.

=== Music ===
In March 2022 John released a gospel album titled "From My Lips to God's Ear". The album was produced by Mercy Productions, owned by Ramin Karimloo.

In May 2022 it was announced that John will be the opening act for the UK Tour dates of Dionne Warwick.

== Theatre credits ==
Year	Title	Role	Theatre
2005	The Lion King	Swing and understudy Shenzi	Lyceum Theatre
2010	Sister Act	Ensemble	London Palladium
2010-2012	We Will Rock You	Meat	Dominion Theatre
2014-2015	Memphis	Felicia (alternate)	Shaftesbury Theatre
2016	The Bodyguard	Nicki Marron	Dominion Theatre and Ed Mirvish Theatre (Toronto)
2017-2018	Hamilton	Angelica Schuyler	Victoria Palace
2019-2020	Girl from the North Country	Mrs Nielsen	Gielgud Theatre
2023	The Secret Life of Bees	August	Almeida Theatre

== Awards and nominations ==
Year	Work	Award	Category	Result
2018	Hamilton	Olivier Awards	Best Actress in a Supporting Role in a Musical	Nominated
2019	Hamilton	Black British Theatre Awards	Best Female Actor in a Musical	Nominated

== Personal life ==
John is a Christian. Having grown up in the church, she made the decision to be baptised at the age of 16.
