= The Sherry Theater =

Not-for-profit theater company

- Address: 11052 Magnolia Blvd; North Hollywood, California; United States
- Opened: 2006

Website
- thesherry.org

The Sherry Theater (or the Sherry) is a not-for-profit theater company founded by Scott Haze in 2006. The Sherry is located in the North Hollywood neighborhood of Los Angeles, California. It was named after Haze's mother.

== History ==
The Sherry Theater was established in 2006 and opened with founder Scott Haze's play Devil's Night. The play was written and directed by Haze, as well as saw him in a starring role. The theater has also been the premiere venue for Haze's plays Valentine's Night and Angel Asylum.

The Sherry also became the initial venue for Haze's 120 Hour Film Festival in 2013. Other plays that have been performed at The Sherry include The Dreamer Examines His Pillow, The Wollgatherer, The Glass Menagerie, and Homecoming.
