= Sleepwalker (2017 film) =

- Directed by: Elliott Lester
- Written by: Jack Olsen
- Produced by: Sharon Bordas; Jennifer Glynn; Hannah Pillemer; Michael Rolff
- Starring: Ahna O'Reilly; Richard Armitage; Izabella Scorupco; Rachel Melvin; Kevin Zegers; Haley Joel Osment
- Cinematography: Pieter Vermeer
- Edited by: Nicholas Wayman-Harris
- Music by: Mark D. Todd
- Production companies: MarVista Entertainment; Night & Day Pictures
- Release date: February 4, 2017 (Santa Barbara International Film Festival)
- Running time: 88 minutes
- Country: United States
- Language: English

Sleepwalker is a 2017 American mystery psychological thriller film directed by Elliott Lester, and starring Ahna O'Reilly.

== Plot ==
Since the suicide of her husband, Jonathan Grey, college student Sarah Foster experiences sleepwalking. Her former professor, Dr. Elaine Cooper, advises her to visit a sleep clinic. There, Dr. Koslov and Dr. Scott White monitor her brain activity. After a night of dreamless sleep, Sarah wakes up in a different room. Koslov informs her that she has been moved for further observation and suggests that she stay longer.

Later, Sarah is confused when a professor and her roommate, Dawn, call her "Miss Wells" instead of "Foster. " Her personal documents also identify her as Sarah Wells. Koslov shows her a form that she had filled out regarding a dream about being chased, but she insists she has not had a dream and that the handwriting is not hers, although it matches. Sarah undergoes another night of dreamless sleep.

Sarah seeks information on selective memory loss and learns about partial retrograde amnesia. At her apartment, she finds her roommate has been replaced by a stranger named Nicole. A phone call from a man claiming to know her adds to her confusion, and Cooper does not recognize her. That night, she dreams of being suffocated.

The next morning, Sarah wakes up in a strange house and finds herself locked out of her apartment, witnessing Nicole and another girl inside. After breaking in through a window, she discovers unfamiliar belongings in her room. A mysterious man taunts her over the phone. She hides in the laundry room, noticing water seeping under the door.

When she wakes up the following morning, everything appears normal again, and Dawn is back. Sarah visits White, sharing her disorienting experiences. He contacts Cooper, who remembers Sarah. White explains that her sleep issues could alter her perception of reality. Outside her apartment, a dark-haired man begins chasing her, but White arrives and offers her a ride, explaining the role of dreams in understanding emotions.

Sarah dreams of being trapped in plastic and wakes up in the strange house again, where she is confronted by a fearful woman. Upon returning to her apartment, the strange belongings reappear. In the lab, Koslov doesn’t recognize her, while a different man also named White claims to know her. During a campus lecture, a woman in the audience recognizes Sarah, further adding to her confusion. After evading the police outside her apartment, she hides in the laundry room again as water starts to seep in.

Eventually, Sarah wakes at the sleep laboratory, where White tells her that the police found her sleepwalking. Though she cannot recall anything, data shows she experienced dreaming. White suggests that the stalker might help connect two realities. Sarah reads her diary and discovers that Jonathan was actually murdered, though she believes he committed suicide.

Back in her apartment, an attack by a dark-haired man leads to confusion when White arrives to find everything undamaged. Cooper advises Sarah to seek protection until her condition stabilizes. Sarah realizes her stalker is named Warren Lambert, and an attack at her apartment reveals memories surfacing. She recalls breaking up with Jonathan over an affair, leading to his death.

One night, her stalker suffocates her with a plastic bag, but White intervenes just in time. The police identify the stalker as a repeat offender. Later, White and Sarah connect intimately. During her sleepwalking, Sarah encounters the woman from her dreams. It becomes clear that she is part of the other woman's nightmare.

Sarah discovers she is actually Anna Wells, the obsessive fan who shot Jonathan. The original Sarah, the real woman, is the one he ended up with. Flashbacks reveal Anna in a coma as she struggles for breath, mistaking her identity as Sarah Foster and locked away in her mind.

== Cast ==
- Ahna O'Reilly as Sarah Foster / Anna Wells
- Richard Armitage as Dr. Scott White
- Izabella Scorupco as Dr. Elaine Cooper
- Rachel Melvin as Dawn
- Kevin Zegers as Dr. Koslov
- Haley Joel Osment as Warren Lambert

== Production ==
Filming took place in Los Angeles in 2014.

== Reception ==
THe Hollywood Reporter said, "the willfully vague plot gradually unravels as inexorably as the protagonist’s perception of reality."
