= In Dubious Battle (film) =

2016 film by James Franco

- Theatrical film poster
- Directed by: James Franco
- Screenplay by: Matt Rager
- Based on: In Dubious Battle by John Steinbeck
- Produced by: James Franco; Andrea Iervolino; Vince Jolivette; Scott Reed; Ron Singer; Iris Torres
- Starring: James Franco; Nat Wolff; Josh Hutcherson; Vincent D'Onofrio; Robert Duvall; Selena Gomez; Keegan Allen; Ed Harris; Bryan Cranston; Sam Shepard; Zach Braff
- Cinematography: Bruce Thierry Cheung
- Edited by: Aaron I. Butler; Gary Roach
- Music by: Volker Bertelmann
- Production companies: AMBI Pictures; Rabbit Bandini Productions; That's Hollywood Pictures Productions
- Distributed by: Momentum Pictures
- Release dates: September 3, 2016 (Venice Film Festival); February 17, 2017 (United States)
- Running time: 114 minutes
- Country: United States
- Language: English
- Box office: $213,982

In Dubious Battle is a 2016 drama film directed and produced by James Franco, loosely based on John Steinbeck's 1936 novel of the same name, with a screenplay by Matt Rager. The film features an ensemble cast, consisting of Franco, Nat Wolff, Josh Hutcherson, Vincent D'Onofrio, Robert Duvall, Selena Gomez, Keegan Allen and Ed Harris. The film had its world premiere at the Venice Film Festival on September 3, 2016.

== Plot ==
In Dubious Battle is the story of the working class during the Great Depression, striking against an increasingly cruel establishment in ways that would lead to the formation of workers' rights, including a minimum wage. Two men form a union of workers after their wages are cut from $3 a day to $1 a day."

== Cast ==
- James Franco as Mac McLeod
- Nat Wolff as Jim Nolan
- Vincent D'Onofrio as London
- Selena Gomez as Lisa London
- Ed Harris as Joy
- Sam Shepard as Mr. Anderson
- John Savage as Dan
- Analeigh Tipton as Vera
- Josh Hutcherson as Vinnie
- Ashley Greene as Danni Stevens
- Zach Braff as Connor
- Austin Stowell as Eddie
- Ahna O'Reilly as Edith "Edie" Malone
- Keegan Allen as Keller
- Robert Duvall as Chris Bolton
- Bryan Cranston as Sheriff
- Scott Haze as Frank
- Alex Morf as Burke
- Danny McBride as Tramp
- Jacob Loeb as Paul
- Joel Marsh Garland as Al Anderson
- Jack Kehler as Dr. Burton

== Production ==
=== Casting ===
On January 30, 2015, it was announced that James Franco would not only direct the film but star in it too. Also cast were Vincent D'Onofrio, Robert Duvall, Ed Harris, Bryan Cranston, Selena Gomez, and Danny McBride has joined the production.

On March 16, 2015, Nat Wolff was cast in the lead role of Jim Nolan, the organizer of the strike by apple pickers in California. In the next two days, Josh Hutcherson, Zach Braff, Analeigh Tipton, John Savage, Ashley Greene, and Ahna O'Reilly would join the currently film production. Several days later on March 24, 2015, it was announced that Scott Haze has been cast as Frank.

=== Filming ===
Principal photography began on March 19, 2015 in Atlanta including Southeastern Railway Museum in Duluth, Georgia, filming also took place in Bostwick, Georgia, and Cowiche, Washington. Production on the film ended in September 2015.

=== Music ===
The concluding credits are accompanied by a 78 rpm recording of Pete Seeger's classic union song, "Which Side Are You On?.

== Release ==
In Dubious Battle had its world premiere at the Venice Film Festival on September 3, 2016. The film was released in theaters in the United States on February 17, 2017.

=== Marketing ===
A full trailer was released on January 28, 2017.

== Reception ==
=== Critical response ===
Review aggregator Rotten Tomatoes gives the film a 30% approval rating, based on reviews from 23 critics, with an average score of 5.1/10. Metacritic assigned the film a weighted average score of 43 out of 100, based on 15 critics, indicating "mixed or average" reviews.

The film gained mixed reviews at its world premiere, with Owen Gleiberman of Variety noting that Franco "has acquired skills that are beginning to fuse with the best of his instincts." Gleiberman also says that "In Dubious Battle isn't a totally clear-cut good movie, but it's a scrupulous and watchable one. And it makes me think, for the first time, that James Franco has a good movie in him."

Boyd van Hoeij of The Hollywood Reporter simply called the film and Franco as "uneven" but also states that "if In Dubious Battle remains watchable, it's because Wolff really sells his character's doubts, growth and sobering reality checks".
