= Chris Egan (musician) =

Chris Egan is a British composer, conductor, orchestrator, arranger, and musical director whose work spans film, television, theatre, live concerts and Music production. He is known for large-scale orchestral scoring as well as his work in television drama, documentary and music production for well known artists.

== Career ==
=== Film ===
Egan has worked across a wide range of feature films in roles including composer, conductor, orchestrator, and music production. He composed the score for the animated feature Fireheart (2022). He also composed the music for the American drama The Prince, written by David Mamet. His other film work includes additional music and arrangement for King of Thieves, Fantastic Beasts and Where to Find Them, Downton Abbey – A New Era, Enola Holmes, Ethel & Ernest, and Napoleon.

In addition to original scoring, Egan frequently conducts recording sessions for feature films.

=== Television ===
Egan's television work includes composing music for drama and documentary. He co-composed the music for the Apple TV+ nature series Tiny World with Benjamin Wallfisch, as well as co-scoring the music for Disney+/National Geographic Will Smith documentary series Pole to Pole with Benjamin Wallfisch. Other television credits include The Spanish Princess, In the Womb: Animal Babies, The Halcyon, Hooten and the Lady, Cilla, Man Down, Upstairs Downstairs, and Britannia High .

=== Theatre ===
Egan has an extensive background in musical theatre, serving as musical director, orchestrator, and arranger for numerous West End and Broadway productions. His theatre work includes The Bodyguard Directed by Thea Sharrock, Grease, Crazy for You, Footloose, Witches of Eastwick, Kiss Me Kate - Chichester festival theatre and The Old Vic London.Dance ’Til Dawn, I Can’t Sing - The Palladium with Cynthia Erivo, Water Babies, End of the Rainbow London and Broadway, and The Pajama Game Chichester Festival Theatre.

He also composed the music for the world premiere stage adaptation of High Noon, written by Academy Award-winning screenwriter Eric Roth and directed by Thea Sharrock, at the Harold Pinter Theatre in London

=== Concert ===
Egan has worked as a musical director, arranger, and conductor for high-profile concert performances and televised specials. He has collaborated with artists including Elaine Paige working as musical director on her live concerts and sky arts television show, The Elaine Paige show, as well as Alexandra Burke, Shirley Bassey, and Lionel Richie, He also worked with the British electronic music group Above & Beyond, contributing string arrangements and orchestration for their 3 Acoustic albums and related live performances, conducting their Hollywood bowl concert.

Music Production

In addition to bespoke scoring, Egan has composed production music for established music libraries. His catalogue includes orchestral, dramatic, and contemporary tracks licensed for use in television, film, and advertising worldwide.

Egan has worked in the video game industry as part of music production and orchestration teams. He is credited as orchestrator and conductor on the original soundtrack for Throne and Liberty, a massively multiplayer online role-playing game developed by NCSOFT and published by Amazon Games, with music recorded by major orchestras including the Chamber Orchestra of London and the Synchron Stage Orchestra Vienna.

Egan has written several albums, and produced music for the production music house Audio Network.
