= Between Us (2016 film) =

2016 film by Rafael Palacio Illingworth

- Theatrical release poster
- Directed by: Rafael Palacio Illingworth
- Written by: Rafael Palacio Illingworth
- Produced by: Bert Hamelinck; Eleonore Meie; Madeline Samit
- Starring: Olivia Thirlby; Ben Feldman; Adam Goldberg; Lio Tipton (Note: Credited as Analeigh Tipton; Tipton came out as non-binary and changed their name in 2021.); Scott Haze; Peter Bogdanovich; Lesley Ann Warren
- Cinematography: Todd Banhazl
- Edited by: Daniel Raj Koobir
- Production companies: Caviar; Nora Films
- Distributed by: IFC Films
- Release dates: April 18, 2016 (Tribeca Film Festival); January 6, 2017 (United States)
- Running time: 94 minutes
- Country: United States
- Language: English

Between Us is a 2016 American drama film written and directed by Rafael Palacio Illingworth. The film stars Olivia Thirlby, Ben Feldman, Adam Goldberg, Lio Tipton, Scott Haze, Peter Bogdanovich and Lesley Ann Warren.

The film had its world premiere at the Tribeca Film Festival on April 18, 2016. It received a limited release and through video on demand on January 6, 2017, by IFC Films.

== Plot ==
A couple for over six years, Dianne and Henry live together in a small apartment. At lunch with family, they receive a lot of pressure to progress in their relationship.

The couple goes to look at new apartments to buy, but Henry is clearly resistant. Their relationship has become routine and faintly boring. Dianne says she doesn't need to further their commitment, yet is more open to the idea, even eyeing engagement rings.

At a screening of a film he's been working on, Henry meets Veronica. She likes the film but says it needs music, so suggests he come see her band doing a gig.

Dianne organizes big events, and meets Robert through work. Her company is doing a publicity event for his website. Going with him in his car to Long Beach, he makes a pass at her. Although she explains she's in a steady relationship, he kisses her.

Dianne and Henry spontaneously get married at city hall, not even having wedding bands. They ask their limo driver to take them somewhere for drinks. Soon their giddiness changes, and Dianne starts crying. Leaving in the limo, they decide to go home.

Not long after the couple argues over the kiss. Henry storms off, and Dianne stays behind, drinking. Shortly thereafter she calls Robert, who comes for her in the car they had taken previously, driven by Nadia, who's clearly with him.

Meanwhile, Henry finds Veronica at a gig, and they party wild through to the morning in a group. She tries to get a few to have an orgy with her and Henry, but they get no takers.

Dianne has met Liam, a performer from an alternative theatrical piece she watches with Robert and Nadia. They spend all night talking and drinking. By morning, they go to hers for a drink and have sex. Dianne makes it clear it was a one off and isn't interested in more, disappointing him as he's going through a divorce.

Henry has gone to Veronica's but it's not clear if they've had sex or not. He leaves her, splayed out naked and face down on her bed. Henry heads home, arriving before Liam has left. Enraged, he tries to fight him, but Liam is much stronger and pins him to the floor. Liam untruthfully says Dianna told him their relationship was over.

Once they are alone, Henry goes to the bedroom supposedly to get things. When he comes out, they have a slap match and she starts to cry. He subdues her with an embrace. At first she declares she hates him, and he responds me too several times over, the struggle becomes a mutual embrace. They sway together, dancing.

== Cast ==
- Olivia Thirlby as Dianne
- Ben Feldman as Henry
- Lio Tipton as Veronica
- Adam Goldberg as Liam
- Betsy Brandt as Gigi
- Lesley Ann Warren as Elsa
- Alison Sudol as Nadia
- John Ross Bowie as Patritzio
- Peter Bogdanovich as George
- Cherilyn Wilson as Jessie
- Scott Haze as Robert

== Production ==
In June 2015, Olivia Thirlby, Ben Feldman, Adam Goldberg, Betsy Brandt, Lesley Ann Warren, Alison Sudol, Scott Haze, John Ross Bowie, Peter Bogdanovich, were all cast in the film, with Rafael Palacio Illingworth directing from his own screenplay.

== Release ==
The film premiered at the Tribeca Film Festival on April 18, 2016. Shortly after, IFC Films acquired U.S. distribution rights to the film. It was released on January 6, 2017.

== Reception ==
The film has a 64% rating from Metacritic.
