= Temara (name) =

Temara may refer to the following notable people:

Given name

- Temara Melek (born 1998), American singer and actress

Surname

- Chante Temara (born 2001), Australian rugby league footballer
- Pou Temara (born 1948), New Zealand academic
- Zahara Temara (born 1997), Australian rugby league footballer, sister of Chante
