= Two Night Stand =

2014 film by Max Nichols

- Theatrical release poster
- Directed by: Max Nichols
- Written by: Mark Hammer
- Produced by: Beau Flynn; Ruben Fleischer; Sam Englebardt; Adam Yoelin
- Starring: Miles Teller; Lio Tipton (Note: Credited as Analeigh Tipton; Tipton came out as non-binary and changed their name in 2021.); Jessica Szohr; Scott Mescudi
- Cinematography: Bobby Bukowski
- Edited by: Matt Garner
- Music by: Matthew de Luca; Neil de Luca
- Production company: Demarest Films
- Distributed by: Entertainment One
- Release date: September 26, 2014 (United States)
- Running time: 86 minutes
- Country: United States
- Language: English
- Budget: $1.6 million
- Box office: $868,081

Two Night Stand is a 2014 American romantic comedy film directed by Max Nichols, written by Mark Hammer, and starring Miles Teller, Lio Tipton, Jessica Szohr, Leven Rambin, and Scott Mescudi.

The film was given a limited theatrical release in the United States on September 26, 2014, by Entertainment One.

== Plot ==
Megan is unemployed and single, and one day she joins a dating website. Her roommates, who just want her to move out, invite her to a party at a club. After a bouncer refuses to let her into the club on the grounds that she looks too young and she did not have her ID, she runs into her ex-fiancé, Chris, and later decides to have a one-night stand with one of the men she found on the website, Alec.

The next morning, they are less than cordial to each other, but Megan is unable to leave because of a blizzard. Forced to spend more time together, the two end up telling each other what they did wrong the previous night, convinced that they will never see each other again, and Megan suggests that they "try again". The two have sex again, with far better results.

Afterwards, Megan discovers a closet full of women's clothes, and pictures of Alec with a girl. She learns that Alec's girlfriend, Daisy, had written a note to him, saying that she wanted to break up, but had not given it to him, but he had found it accidentally. Alec wanted to have something to rub in her face when she broke up with him, and so he had joined the dating website. Angry, Megan leaves.

When Daisy returns, she finds a note that Megan had scribbled, and she and Alec exchange the notes that they had found, and they break up. At a New Year's Eve party, Megan is arrested because the same note was found in Alec's neighbor's apartment, which the two had broken into earlier. Alec arrives at the jail with flowers and balloons. He pays her bail, but Megan refuses to see him or even leave the holding cell.

Later, when her roommates come to pay bail, Alec apologizes, saying that he did not know her last name and that this was the only way he thought he could see her again. He says that it might be something that the two of them would laugh about years later, but Megan is still angry because she had to spend time in jail. She makes him a deal, asking for his number and promising to call him the moment she laughed about it. She takes a closer look at the presents he gave her. Minutes later, she starts laughing upon seeing the balloon that reads "I'm sorry, I'm an asshole" and calls Alec. He meets her outside the police station and they kiss in the middle of the road, when it starts snowing again.

== Cast ==
- Miles Teller as Alec
- Lio Tipton as Megan
- Jessica Szohr as Faiza
- Scott Mescudi as Cedric
- Leven Rambin as Daisy
- Michael Showalter as Rick Raines
- Josh Salatin as Chris
- Kellyn Lindsay as Becca
- Chris Conroy as Ben
- Joey Lauren Adams as voice of Darella, dating website customer service agent

== Production ==
The plot would eventually mirror a natural disaster the production faced once it came time to shoot. "The script was one out of a hundred where I thought, 'I have to do this movie'", Nichols said. "I was intrigued from the very premise. The characters are smart and funny, but the story digs much deeper ... It reminded me of coming-of-age stories from my youth." Nichols read the script, which appeared on The Black List in December 2011, and pitched his vision of the story to producers Beau Flynn, Ruben Fleischer and Adam Yoelin. "I was shooting a Willie Nelson video in Austin, TX in May [2012] and got a call that I [was on board]", said Nichols. "We immediately started casting the film and were lucky to have a lot of talented actors and actresses who were interested, but there was something about [Lio] Tipton's 'Megan' that caught my attention." Nichols said it was "essential" that her character's "date" Alec understand that "he's never met a girl like her and can't let her go." Miles Teller joined the cast soon afterward as Alec and the rest of casting was completed in late summer.

After the primary cast was in place, producers went off "to work their [financing] magic", said Nichols, and the shoot was scheduled for October 2012, which coincided with Hurricane Sandy. "Production had to go down for two days", Nichols said. "After it was over we had the challenge of a gas shortage which meant no power for our generators and trucks." The Two Night Stand shoot was only scheduled to take 19 days and some of the planned locations were without electricity post-storm. "[Lio] and Miles were staying downtown in an apartment and were stranded there without power", added Nichols, giving the actors a real-life parallel to their characters' own predicament. Production managed to recoup its time-loss and Nichols bunkered down with editor Matt Garner at Harbor Picture Company to edit.

== Release ==
Shortly after Two Night Stand was screened at the American Film Market on November 6, 2013, the film received distribution offers from A24 and Radius-TWC. Entertainment One ultimately acquired the US distribution rights to the film later that month. The film began a limited theatrical release in the United States on September 26, 2014, before its release on iTunes and video on demand a week later on October 3.

== Reception ==
The film received mixed reviews from critics. On the review aggregator website Rotten Tomatoes, the film holds an approval rating of 38% based on 47 reviews, with an average rating of 4.9/10. The website's critics consensus reads, "Two Night Stand proves even a pair of well-matched leads isn't enough to take a rom-com all the way from interesting idea to watchable feature." In a positive review for Behind the Lens, Debbie Lynn Elias wrote, "exuberant and engaging, filled with youthful fun and genuine moments of wide-eyed enchantment, Two Night Stand captures the heart with humor and sweet romance." The New York Times complimented Teller and Tipton's chemistry, writing, "It's hard not to root for this couple - and, more to the point, these actors - to get together again." Writing for Variety, critic Ella Taylor said that Nichols and Hammer "have their fingers on the generational pulse," describing the film as, "an absorbing dramedy about two bruised souls mustering the nerve to open themselves up to love again."

On Metacritic, the film has a score of 45 out of 100, based on 17 critics, indicating "mixed or average reviews".
