= Phillip R. Allen =

American actor (died 2012)

- Phillip R. Allen in Star Trek III: The Search for Spock (1984)
- Born: March 26, 1939; Pittsburgh, Pennsylvania, U.S.
- Died: March 1, 2012 (aged 72); Los Angeles, California, U.S.
- Other names: Philip R. Allen; Phillip Richard Allen; Phillip Allen; Phil Allen
- Occupation: Actor
- Years active: 1965–2009
- Spouse: Joan Allen
- Children: Keegan Allen; Deborah Allen; Kim Allen

Phillip Richard Allen (March 26, 1939 – March 1, 2012) was an American stage, film, and television actor probably best known today for his role as Captain Esteban in Star Trek III: The Search for Spock (1984).

== Biography ==
Allen studied acting at the Neighborhood Playhouse in New York City where he starred in Edward Albee's play Zoo Story and the Pulitzer Prize winning play That Championship Season, winning best acting awards for both. He was also featured in The Normal Heart, the controversial award-winning play dealing with the early years of the AIDS crisis.

Allen appeared in feature films including Midway, The Onion Field and Mommie Dearest.

He was best known for his television work, primarily during the 1970s and 1980s; he had recurring roles on The Mary Tyler Moore Show, and The Bad News Bears. Allen's many TV guest appearances include Dark Shadows, The Doctors, The Bob Newhart Show, Happy Days, Kojak, Eight Is Enough, The Tony Randall Show, Quincy, M.E., C.P.O. Sharkey, Baretta, Dallas, Matlock, The Fall Guy and Law & Order.

Allen died in 2012 at the age of 72. He is survived by daughter Debbie Morton (Allen), sons Kim Allen and actor Keegan Allen.

== Filmography ==
=== Films ===
Year	Title	Role	Notes
1965	One Naked Night		Unconfirmed
1970	A Woman in Love	Phil	
1970	Interplay	Eddie	(credited as Phil Allen)
1974	Trapped Beneath the Sea	Lt. Cmdr. Hanratty	TV movie
1976	The Lindbergh Kidnapping Case	Detective Bell	TV movie
1976	Helter Skelter	Sgt. Manuel Gris	TV movie
1976	Midway	Lt. Cmdr. John S. 'Jimmy' Thach	
1976	Snafu	Capt. Robinson	TV movie
1976	Special Delivery	Browne	Uncredited
1977	Mary Jane Harper Cried Last Night	Mr. Bernards	TV movie
1977	Sheila	Brad Wooly	(credited as Philip R Allen)
1978	A Family Upside Down	Dr. Russo	TV movie
1978	More Then Friends	William Kane	TV movie
1979	The Child Stealer	Gersh	TV movie
1979	Friendly Fire	Ralph Jenner	TV movie
1979	The Lady in Red	Elliot Ness	
1979	The Onion Field	District attorney Marshall Schulman	Uncredited
1980	A Rumor of War	Col. Perry	miniseries
1980	Blinded by the Light	Dr. Brockton	TV movie
1981	The Big Black Pill	Commissioner Wilkie	TV movie
1981	Mommie Dearest	Pepsi Executive #1	
1982	The Six of Us	Robert Benjamin	TV movie
1982	Honeyboy	Jimmy Bowford	TV movie
1983	An Uncommon Love	Dean Laurents	TV movie
1984	Star Trek III: The Search for Spock	Captain Esteban (USS Grissom)	(credited as Phillip Richard Allen)
1985	Midas Valley	Eric Gregory	TV movie
1987	In Self Defense	Leon Toner	TV movie, (credited as Phillip Richard Allen)
1988	Reunion	Actor	(credited as Phillip Richard Allen)
1988	My Father, My Son	Lt. Kerr	TV movie, (credited as Phillip Allen)
1988	A Very Brady Christmas	Ted Roberts	TV movie
1991	The Last to Go	Hendrick	TV movie
1992	Mortal Sins	Lt. Williams	TV movie
1993	Marilyn & Bobby: Her Final Affair	Jake Herschel	TV movie

=== Television ===
Year	Title	Role	Notes
1969	N.Y.P.D.	Policeman	"No Day Trippers Need Apply"
1970	Dark Shadows	Policeman	Episode #1.1034
1971	Police Story	Ellison	"The Wyatt Earp Syndrome"
1974	Get Christie Love!	Murray Gordon	"Downbeat for a Dead Man"
1975	Joe Forrester	(credited as Phil Allen)	"Powder Blue"
1975	The Mary Tyler Moore Show	Gus Brubaker	"Mary's Delinquent" "Mary Richards: Producer"
1975	The Bob Newhart Show	Dr. Frank Walburn	"Seemed Like a Good Idea at the Time" "My Business Is Shrinking"
1976	Quincy, M.E.	Floyd Baker	"A Star Is Dead"
1976	Kojak	Andy Cooper	"The Forgotten Room"
1976	Most Wanted	Warren	"The Two Dollar Kidnappers"
1977	The Streets of San Francisco	Tim Rossiter	"Monkey Is Back"
1977	The Hardy Boys/Nancy Drew Mysteries	Everett	"The Mystery of the Diamond Triangle"
1977	Washington: Behind Closed Doors	Walter Tulloch	TV miniseries
1977	The Tony Randall Show	Glazer	"Skin Game"
1977	Lou Grant	Fred Sackler	"Psych-Out"
1977	Kojak	Lt. Williamson	"The Summer of '69: Part 1"
1978	Eight Is Enough	Samuel Benchley	"Much Ado About Garbage"
1978	Baa Baa Black Sheep	Commander of Squadron 367 (credited as Phillip Richard Allen)	"Forbidden Fruit"
1978	Baretta	Mike Parks	"The Stone Conspiracy"
1978	C.P.O. Sharkey	Erickson	"Fear of Flying"
1978	Husbands, Wives & Lovers	Dan Pinewood	"Six Characters Flunk a Sex Quiz and Go Somewhere to Do Something About It"
1978	Quincy, M.E.	Dr. Finley	"Speed Trap"
1978	ABC Afterschool Specials	Jim Radigan	"Gaucho"
1978	The Hardy Boys	Harry Gibbon	"Dangerous Waters"
1978	Lou Grant	Sackler	"Renewal"
1979	The Bad News Bears	Roy Turner	"First Base" "Fielder's Choice" "Men Will Be Boys" "The Kelly Story"
1980	The Bad News Bears	Roy Turner	"Double Play" "Old Timers' Day" "Wedding Bells: Part 2"
1980	A Rumor of War	Col. Perry (credited as Phillip Allen)	TV mini-series
1980	Hagen	Malone (credited as Phillip Richard Allen)	"Hagen (Pilot)"
1980	Lou Grant	David Marcus	"Hazard"
1981	Bosom Buddies	Dr. Leon	"Sonny Boy"
1981	Happy Days	Eddie Monroe - College Recruiter	"Scholarship"
1981	The Misadventures of Sheriff Lobo	Mr. Gregory	"Lobo and the Pirates"
1981	Lou Grant	Marvin Hartley	"Stroke"
1981	Dallas	Lloyd Bettinger	"The Big Shut Down"
1981	Alice	Mitch Aames	"Alice's Halloween Surprise"
1981	Hart to Hart	Doctor	"Harts Under Glass"
1982	Cassie & Co.	Schelling	"The Golden Silence"
1982	Open All Night	Jimbo	"Such Good Friends"
1982	Alice	Mitch Aames	"The Valentine's Day Massacre"
1982	Mork & Mindy	George Logan	"Cheerleader in Chains"
1982	Private Benjamin	Bruce	"Astro-Chimp"
1983	Benson	Collins	"The Governor's Brain Is Missing"
1984	Cover Up	Detective Zaneck	"Harper-Gate"
1984	Too Close for Comfort	Fitzgerald	"The Missing Fink"
1984	The Fall Guy	Boyd	"Sandcastles"
1987	The Bronx Zoo	Mr. Reese (credited as Phillip Richard Allen)	"The Power of a Lie" "Runaway Hearts"
1987	The New Mike Hammer	Mr. Milo	"A Face in the Night"
1988	Matlock	Robert Bell (credited as Phillip Richard Allen)	"The Body "
1988	Houston Knights	(credited as Phillip Richard Allen)	"Vigilante"
1988	9 to 5	Paul	"Strictly Personal"
1988	21 Jump Street	Mr. Wilder (credited as Phillip Richard Allen)	"Champagne High"
1988	Probe	Lou McNally	"Quit-It"
1988	Out of This World	Mr. Rogers	"Broadway Danny Derek"
1989	Designing Women	Tom Ketcherside	"The Naked Truth"
1990	Out of This World	Mike Rollins	"A Kinder, Gentler Mayor"
1991	Law & Order	D.A. Davis (credited as Phillip R. Allen)	"The Torrents of Greed: Part 1" "The Torrents of Greed: Part 2"
1993	Homefront	Smith	"By Word or Act"
2004	Center of the Universe	Al (The Coachman)	" And the Silver Medal Goes To..."
2009	The Londoners	Richard Mansfield	Episode #2.16, (final appearance)

== Stage work ==
- Zoo Story (1990) M
- 50/60 Vision: Plays and Playwrights That Changed The Theatre (Thirteen Plays in Repertory) (1989–90)
- Rain from Heaven (1987)
- The Normal Heart - Ben Weeks (1985)
- Desert Fire (1983)
- Are You There or Have You Ever Been? (1974)
- That Championship Season - Tom Daley (1973–74)
- Sticks and Bones (1972)
- Quietus (1972)
- Harvey- Dr. Lyman Sanderson (1971)
- Adaptation/Next-Contestant (1969–70)
- Cafe Chino (1965)
