= The Sound and the Fury (2014 film) =

2014 film

- Theatrical release poster
- Directed by: James Franco
- Screenplay by: Matt Rager
- Based on: The Sound and the Fury by William Faulkner
- Produced by: Caroline Aragon; Lee Caplin; Vince Jolivette; Miles Levy
- Starring: James Franco; Scott Haze; Ahna O'Reilly; Joey King; Tim Blake Nelson
- Cinematography: Bruce Thierry Cheung
- Edited by: Ian Olds
- Music by: Tim O'Keefe
- Distributed by: New Films International
- Release dates: September 5, 2014 (Venice); October 23, 2015 (United States)
- Running time: 101 minutes
- Country: United States
- Language: English
- Budget: $1 million

The Sound and the Fury is an American drama film directed by James Franco. It is the second film version of the 1929 novel of the same name by William Faulkner (the previous adaptation, directed by Martin Ritt, was released in 1959). The film stars Franco, Tim Blake Nelson, Scott Haze, Loretta Devine, Ahna O'Reilly, Joey King, Jacob Loeb, Janet Gretzky, Dwight Henry, Logan Marshall-Green, Jim Parrack, Seth Rogen, and Danny McBride.

The film was released in a limited release and through video on demand on October 23, 2015, by New Films International.

== Plot ==
The film focuses on the Compson family, and their struggles to adjust to the changing society of the 20th century Deep South, told from four different perspectives: the mentally disabled Benjy Compson, the fragile intellectual Quentin, the vile Jason and his family's old black servant, Dilsey.

== Cast ==
- James Franco as Benjy Compson
- Jacob Loeb as Quentin Compson
- Joey King as Miss Quentin
- Tim Blake Nelson as Jason Compson III
- Loretta Devine as Dilsey
- Ahna O'Reilly as Caddy Compson
- Scott Haze as Jason Compson IV
- Kylen Davis as Luster
- Seth Rogen as Telegraph operator (cameo)
- Danny McBride as Sheriff (cameo)
- Dwight Henry as Roskus
- Logan Marshall-Green as Dalton Ames
- Janet Gretzky as Caroline Bascomb Compson
- Jim Parrack as Herbert Ames

In an early interview with Franco in 2013, the director suggested he wanted Jon Hamm in the role of Mr. Compson. Hamm's schedule was too tight and the role ultimately went to Tim Blake Nelson, but in spite of this the story that Hamm was in the movie persisted. Even as late as the film's screening at the 2014 Toronto International Film Festival some playbills still made this claim, and the posters had to be reprinted before opening.

== Production ==
In January 2014, it was reported Keegan Allen, Tim Blake Nelson, Seth Rogen, Danny McBride, Loretta DeVine, and Janet Gretzky had joined the cast of the film.

== Release ==
The film had its world premiere at the Venice Film Festival on September 5, 2014. It was screened at the Toronto International Film Festival on September 6, 2014, at the Ryerson Theatre. The film was scheduled to be released in a limited release and through video on demand on October 23, 2015.

== Reception ==
The film received mostly negative reviews from film critics, with many feeling that Franco was incapable of presenting such a complex novel in a cinematic fashion. Paul McInnis of The Guardian, writing from Toronto, said, "Franco attempts to recreate the book's impressionistic style and complex structure. He makes a fist of it, but in concentrating so much on the art he fails to give the viewer any story or characters to care about."

Andrew Barker of Variety felt that the film was "a folly, failing to capture the weird, entrancing, often maddening ambiance of the great writer's elliptical masterpiece, and its surfeit of half-baked film-student flourishes and needless cameos occasionally give it an amateur-hour feel. But Franco nonetheless shows improvement over 2013’s As I Lay Dying, and well, it’s hard to fault him for trying."

The Sound and the Fury has an approval rating of 22% on review aggregator website Rotten Tomatoes, based on 9 reviews, and an average rating of 4.5/10. Metacritic assigned the film a weighted average score of 38 out of 100, based on 6 critics, indicating "generally unfavourable reviews".
