= Keegan Allen =

American actor, photographer, author, and musician

- Born: Keegan Phillip Allen; July 22, 1989 (age 37); California, U.S.
- Occupations: Actor; musician; author; photographer
- Years active: 2002–present
- Father: Phillip R. Allen

Keegan Phillip Allen (born July 22, 1989) is an American actor, photographer, author, and musician. Son of actor Phillip R. Allen, he is known for his recurring role as Toby Cavanaugh on the Freeform series Pretty Little Liars (2010–2017) and starring portrayal of Liam Walker in the CW western drama series Walker (2021–2024). He won a Teen Choice Award for the former.

== Early life ==
Allen was born and raised in California, the son of actor Phillip R. Allen and artist Joan Snyder Allen. In 2009, he graduated with a Bachelor of Fine Arts degree from American Musical and Dramatic Academy. Allen is Jewish, as is his mother.

== Career ==
Allen's passion in his younger years tended towards photography, cinematography and other roles behind the camera. However, at age 13, he landed his first paid job for a small, non-speaking role in a documentary for Animal Planet. In 2010, Allen appeared in an episode of Nickelodeon's TV show Big Time Rush. Shortly after, he began playing the recurring role of Toby Cavanaugh, the love interest of Spencer Hastings (Troian Bellisario), on the ABC Family (later Freeform) mystery series Pretty Little Liars.

In addition to acting, Allen is an accomplished photographer who has published two photography books. In 2015, life.love.beauty was released. The Ingram and Publishers Weekly bestselling book, in Allen's words, "Takes you on a photographic voyage through my life so far." In 2018, Allen published HOLLYWOOD: Photos and Stories from Foreverland.

In 2017, Allen released a digital-only music single, "Million Miles Away." Also in 2017, he started the podcast Foreverland, about his life, interests and experiences. In 2014, he appeared as a celebrity guest at the Super Smash Bros. Invitational 2014.

On February 19, 2020, it was announced that Allen was cast as Liam Walker, the brother of Cordell Walker, in The CW crime drama reboot series Walker.

== Personal life ==
On October 8, 2026, Allen was left bloodied after being robbed at gunpoint and pistol-whipped in the parking lot of a West Hollywood grocery store.

== Bibliography ==
- Allen, Keegan (2015). life.love.beauty. Macmillan Publishing. ISBN 9781250065704.
- Allen, Keegan (2018). HOLLYWOOD: Photos and Stories from Foreverland. Macmillan Publishing. ISBN 9781250086020.

== Filmography ==
=== Film ===
Year	Title	Role	Notes
2002	Small Emergencies	Parakeet Owner's Son	Short film
2010	As a Last Resort	Driver	Short film
2013	Palo Alto	Archie "Skull"	
2014	The Sound and the Fury	Man with Red Tie	
2016	King Cobra	Harlow Cuadra	
2016	In Dubious Battle	Keller	
2017	Actors Anonymous	Trey	
2019	Zeroville	Pale Blue Eyes Killer	
2020	No Escape	Cole Turner	

=== Television ===
Year	Title	Role	Notes
2007	Zoey 101	Boy in the Audience	Episode: "Wrestling"
2010	Big Time Rush	Model #2	Episode: "Big Time Jobs"
2010–2017	Pretty Little Liars	Toby Cavanaugh	Recurring role; 90 episodes
2011	CSI: Crime Scene Investigation	Max Ferris	Episode: "Turn On, Tune In, Drop Dead"
2013	I Hate My Teenage Daughter	Jake	Episode: "Teenage Party"
2014	The Hazing Secret	Trent Rothman	Television film
2015	Young & Hungry	Tyler	Episode: "Young & Back to Normal"
2017	A Moving Romance	Scott Norrell	Television film
2017	Major Crimes	Aiden Reed	Guest role; 2 episodes
2019	What/If	Billy	Guest role; 2 episodes
2019	Rick and Morty	Partygoer	Episode: "Claw and Hoarder: Special Ricktim's Morty"; voice role
2021–2024	Walker	Liam Walker	Main role; 53 episodes
2026	The Rookie	Deputy Ian Coleman	Episode: "The Network"

=== Theater ===
Year	Title	Role	Venue	Company	Notes
2013	Small Engine Repair	Chad	Lucille Lortel Theatre	MCC Theater	

=== Web ===
Year	Title	Role	Notes
2016	Youthful Daze	Kyle	Episode: "Punisher"

=== Music videos ===
Year	Title	Artist	Role	Ref.
2013	"Karma's Not Pretty"	Temara Melek	The Bad Boy	

== Awards and nominations ==
Year	Award	Category	Nominated work	Result
2011	Teen Choice Awards	"Choice Summer TV Star: Male"	Pretty Little Liars	Nominated
2013	TV Guide Awards	"Favorite Villain" (Shared with: Janel Parrish)	Pretty Little Liars	Nominated
2013	Teen Choice Awards	"Choice Summer TV Star: Male"	Pretty Little Liars	Won
2014	Teen Choice Awards	"Choice TV Actor: Drama"	Pretty Little Liars	Nominated
2015	Teen Choice Awards	"Choice TV Actor: Drama"	Pretty Little Liars	Nominated
2016	Teen Choice Awards	"Choice TV Actor: Drama"	Pretty Little Liars	Nominated
