= Fireheart =

2022 animated film by Theodore Ty and Lauren Zeitoun

- Theatrical release poster
- Directed by: Theodore Ty; Laurent Zeitoun
- Written by: Laurent Zeitoun; Jennica Harper; Daphne Ballon
- Story by: Laurent Zeitoun; Jennica Harper; Lisa Hunter
- Produced by: Laurent Zeitoun; Andre Rouleau; Valerie D'Auteuil; Yann Zenou
- Starring: Olivia Cooke; William Shatner; Laurie Holden; Kenneth Branagh
- Cinematography: Jericca Cleland
- Edited by: Robert Yates
- Music by: Chris Egan
- Production companies: L'Atelier Animation; Anton; Caramel Films
- Distributed by: Entertainment One
- Release dates: 2 February 2022 (France and United States); 13 July 2022 (Canada)
- Running time: 92 minutes
- Countries: United States; Canada; France
- Language: English
- Budget: $40 million
- Box office: $6.2 million

Fireheart is a 2022 animated adventure comedy film directed by Theodore Ty and Lauren Zeitoun and written by Zeitoun, Jennica Harper, and Daphne Ballon from a story by Zeitoun, Harper, and Lisa Hunter. It is the second film and final Independent film produced by L'Atelier Animation after Ballerina before Cinesite acquired L'Atelier. It features the voices of Olivia Cooke, Kenneth Branagh, Laurie Holden, Shoshana Sperling, and William Shatner. The plot follows a teenage girl who dreams of becoming a firefighter.

== Plot ==
In Brooklyn, New York in 1930, 6-year-old Georgia Nolan aspires to be a fireman like her father used to be, before he retired to become a tailor. When Shawn tells her women are not allowed to be firemen, Georgia pretends to give it up and follow in his footsteps as a seamstress, but secretly begins training on her rooftop alongside her faithful Dalmatian sidekick Ember.

Ten years later, in 1940, Mayor Murray asks Shawn to end his retirement to head up a young team of firefighters to combat a unidentified arsonist who is burning down the city's theaters with a strange purple fire and has somehow kidnapped all the city's other firefighters. Willing to help and determined to prove herself to her father, Georgia disguises herself as a man named Joe and joins the team.

While in disguise, "Joe" meets the other firemen: Jinn, a Chinese who loves to drive fast as a cheetah but suffers from narcolepsy, and Ricardo, a muscular Spanish with a passion for chemistry and physics who can analyze the source of the fire. With training, the three become an effective unit, able to counter each other's inexperience and weaknesses with their own strengths.

By the time they determine the cause of the blaze - an impressive chemical in a glass ball triggered by music - only one concert hall remains. Despite being blocked off, an African-American diva named Laura Devine has been repeatedly breaking in to rehearse her upcoming musical. When asked to leave, she refuses, talking about how her childhood in the Jim Crow south taught her to never take no for an answer. When she demands her assistant Pauline haul her into the air for another round of practice, the crank handle snaps off in her hands, sending her crashing thru the floorboards leaving her into a full body cast.

"Joe" talks with Pauline. Seeing another woman discouraged about her career, she unmasks herself and tells her to go after her dreams. Unfortunately, Pauline is later fired by Devine and seemingly dies in the next blaze.

After suspecting first Devine and then the mayor, Shawn and "Joe" uncover the truth - the mayor and Devine are secretly dating because she's ashamed of being seen in public with a politician. The arsonist is revealed to be Pauline, a frustrated chemist and special-effects artist who has decided to burn the city down in revenge for her many insulting and sexist rejection letters. They also find all the missing firefighters, who have been hypnotized by the chemicals.

Triumphantly, "Joe" tells her father her true identity, but he still refuses to let her become a firefighter, admitting that she is actually the child of a couple he could not save in a fire 16 years ago. He promised to always look after her and keep her safe, and if she became a firefighter, he could not keep his promise. He also confesses to her that he used "girls can't be firemen".

After facing down Pauline's final act of vengeance, Shawn and Ember release the hypnotized firemen while Georgia goes to deal with Pauline. Pauline tries to get Georgia to join her in taking revenge, but she refuses, knowing her father meant well, and the fire in her heart burns for saving people, not hurting them. When Pauline tries to retaliate on Georgia after she thwarts her plans by knocking her over the edge of the platform only for her to grab onto a hose, she almost falls off to her death only to be caught by Georgia, who tells her firefighters are one big family.

After Pauline gets arrested, Georgia reconciles with her father and becomes the first female firefighter, while Jinn returns to driving a cab and hints that he hopes Shawn might let him ask Georgia out someday. As the end credits roll, various pictures and historic facts about the other female firefighters are displayed, including the fact that they were not paid until 1982.

== Cast ==
- Olivia Cooke as Georgia Nolan
  - Maya Misaljevic as Young Georgia Nolan
- William Shatner as Jimmy Murray, the mayor of New York
- Laurie Holden as Pauline
- Kenneth Branagh as Shawn Nolan, Georgia's father
- Shoshana Sperling as Ember, Georgia Nolan's Dalmatian.
- Ryan Garcia as Ricardo
- Wilex Ly as Jinn
- Mara Junot as Laura Divine
- Scott Humphrey as Captain Neil
- Mark Edwards as Pickle Vendor

== Release ==
The film was released in the United States by Hulu in February 2022 exclusively on the service of the same name, and in Europe by Entertainment One throughout the rest of the year. The same year, the film was released as a Sky Cinema original by Sky on May 27 in the UK.

== Reception ==
On the review aggregator website Rotten Tomatoes, 60% of four reviews are positive. The film grossed $3.7 million at the box office.
