= The Bodyguard (musical) =

2012 stage musical by Alexander Dinelaris

- Original London production poster
- Music: Various
- Lyrics: Various
- Book: Alexander Dinelaris
- Basis: The Bodyguard by Mick Jackson; Lawrence Kasdan
- Premiere: 5 December 2012: Adelphi Theatre
- Productions: 2012 West End; 2015 UK tour 2016 West End; 2016 US tour 2018 UK tour 2023 UK tour 2025 UK tour 2026 North American tour

The Bodyguard is a 2012 stage musical with a book by Alexander Dinelaris, based on the 1992 film The Bodyguard, with the score featuring songs recorded by Whitney Houston including "One Moment in Time", "I Wanna Dance with Somebody" and her pop version of Dolly Parton's "I Will Always Love You". The show began previews at the Adelphi Theatre in London's West End, on 6 November 2012, and officially opened on 5 December 2012.

== Background ==
The musical is based on the 1992 film The Bodyguard which starred and featured songs by Whitney Houston. The show was officially confirmed in February 2012, a few days after the singer's death, and following six years of development, producers confirmed the show would play London's Adelphi Theatre from November 2012. The show is written by Alexander Dinelaris, produced by Michael Harrison and David Ian directed by Thea Sharrock, set and costumes are designed by Tim Hatley, with lighting by Mark Henderson, sound by Richard Brooker, video projection by Duncan McLean, choreography by Arthur Pita, musical supervision and vocal arrangements by Mike Dixon and musical arrangements, orchestrations and underscore by Chris Egan.

The show's book by Alexander Dinelaris brings the story forward to present day and changes the focus of the story to bring the character of Rachel Marron to the forefront rather than the bodyguard. The script adapted from the original screenplay by Lawrence Kasdan also expands the role of Rachel Marron's sister Nicki. The stage musical like the original film features music by Whitney Houston which in addition to the original movie soundtrack adds the following additional Houston tracks: "So Emotional", "One Moment in Time", "Saving All My Love for You", "I'm Your Baby Tonight", "How Will I Know", "Oh Yes", "All the Man That I Need", "All at Once", and "I Wanna Dance with Somebody".

Following Whitney Houston's death, the show's star Heather Headley considered withdrawing from the role of Rachel Marron originated by Houston in the film. She later said "You don't want people to compare you to Whitney. I didn't want it before and especially not now after her passing. I want people to come in and say this is Heather's version - this is Heather playing Rachel Marron and singing Whitney songs. I am always trying to find a way to make them my own but still acknowledge and keep the integrity of her music."

== Synopsis (current version) ==
=== Act One ===
Rachel Marron is one of the most famous singers around but is unaware that a stalker has been sending her deranged and disturbing death threats. She continues to perform while her manager searches for a bodyguard that can protect her ("Queen of the Night"). Frank Farmer is a former Secret Service Agent hired to serve as Rachel's bodyguard. Frank manages to get into Rachel's mansion without needing any clearance and explains that security needs to be heightened, but Rachel is oblivious to her stalker's threatening notes and believes that she is perfectly safe. Frank watches as Rachel rehearses one of her songs with her young ten-year-old son Fletcher ("How Will I Know"). Afterward, Frank is introduced to Rachel's existing bodyguard, Tony, who believes that he is good enough and that Rachel doesn't need Frank to protect her.

Rachel works on a new song with her sister, Nicki ("Greatest Love of All"). Meanwhile, Frank equips Rachel's mansion with security, and Fletcher imprints on him, looking up to Frank as a fatherly figure. Rachel sees them interacting and goes up to Frank and tells him that she doesn't want him to interact with her or her family. Frank leaves for the night to see Nicki perform at a small club. After performing, Nicki sits down with Frank and shares a drink with him. She tells him about her childhood band, and that after Rachel joined it became clear that there could only be one singer in the family. Frank gives a chilly Nicki his coat, and Nicki flirts with him, hoping to begin a romantic relationship with him ("Saving All My Love for You").

Sy, Rachel's music producer, pressures an angry Rachel to perform at a nightclub called the Mayan. Rachel ignores him and angrily vents about Frank, who won't let her go to Sunday Brunch. Frank tells Rachel that she can't do anything that she's normally done, like weekly Sunday Brunch. Rachel asks Frank if she can perform at the Mayan, but Frank tells her that it's too dangerous. In an effort to anger Frank, Rachel tells Sy to book the show at the Mayan.

The night of the show at the Mayan approaches and Rachel's stalker prepares to kill her. Rachel arrives at the Mayan to find a death threat in her dressing room. Frank reveals to Rachel that this isn't the first note and that a stalker is trying to kill her. Frank tells Rachel that they should leave, but Rachel declines, explaining that she doesn't want to be a coward. Rachel gets on stage and performs, but the stalker comes on stage and almost stabs her, before being thrown off stage by Frank. Frank swoops Rachel up into his arms and runs out of the club with her, saving her from death. ("Mayan Medley"). Back at home, both Rachel and Nicki wonder about their feelings for Frank ("Run To You").

Rachel begins to be more cautious and asks Frank out on a date since she can't leave the house unless he's with her. Frank reluctantly agrees, and the two go to a small karaoke bar, where a group of college girls performs a hilarious and broken rendition of "Where Do Broken Hearts Go". Rachel tries to figure out Frank's life and says that if she gets him figured out then he has to sing. Frank agrees and Rachel guesses incorrectly, but Frank decides to sing anyway. He goes up to the stage and sings a shaky rendition of Dolly Parton's "I Will Always Love You". Rachel goes up after him and surprises the audience as they realize that she is the real Rachel Marron. Rachel proclaims her love for Frank and the two embrace and share a passionate kiss ("I Have Nothing").

=== Act Two ===
Rachel wakes up in bed next to a sleeping Frank, presumably after sex. Nicki sees this and grows jealous of her sister. Soon afterwards, Rachel works on a new song in the recording studio ("All the Man That I Need").

Frank later gets a call from his colleague Ray Court that he needs to break off his relationship with Rachel, explaining that the stalker followed them to the karaoke bar and stole Rachel's scarf. Frank tells Rachel that he was reckless and can't be romantically involved with a "client". Rachel is extremely mad and storms off. Frank comforts a troubled Fletcher by giving him a clearance badge for the night of the Oscars. Frank then leaves with Rachel for a benefit concert in Miami, Florida, where Rachel performs a splendid routine ("I'm Every Woman").

Frank checks in with the temporary bodyguard who is watching Nicki and Fletcher. Everything is presumably fine, but Frank is unaware that the temporary bodyguard is actually the stalker. The stalker tells Fletcher that he needs help with Rachel's "present", and Fletcher eagerly goes to help him. Nicki sits in her room thinking about her unrequited love for Frank, but upon going inside Fletcher's room she sees that he has disappeared and in his place on the bed is one of Rachel's dresses, stolen from her dressing room ("All At Once"). Nicki calls Frank and Rachel and they return home from Miami. Fletcher is alright, but the stalker took his clearance badge for the Oscars. Realizing that her son and sister are in as much danger as she is, Rachel tells Frank that she will do whatever he says if it will keep them protected. Frank has Rachel cancel the rest of her tour and the four of them travel to Frank's deceased parent's cabin ("Run To You (Reprise)"). Frank confides in Rachel that this cabin holds many memories and that he misses his parents, who he wishes he had spent more time with before they died. Frank watches happily as Rachel shares a tender moment with her sister and son ("Jesus Loves Me").

That night a drunken Nicki admits to Frank that she once wrote back to the stalker pretending to be Rachel in order to feel attention. Nicki now believes that it's her fault that all of this has happened, and Frank comforts her and promises to catch the stalker. Soon afterward the stalker breaks into the cabin and approaches Nicki. She believes that it's Frank, but screams in terror as the stalker fatally stabs her ("Nicki's Death"). Frank, Rachel and Fletcher run into the room and find Nicki on the ground. The stalker runs off and Frank chases after him, trying to shoot him down. Meanwhile, Rachel tries to keep her sister alive but weeps as she dies in her arms ("Jesus Loves Me (Reprise)").

Frank, Rachel and Fletcher return home. Frank comforts a fearful Fletcher and asks Rachel if she is still going to attend the Oscars. Rachel tells Frank about her and her sister's dream of winning an Oscar and decides to do it for her sister.

At the Oscars, Rachel performs "One Moment in Time" from the Oscar nominated film Queen of the Night that she co-wrote with Nicki. As she performs the stalker prepares to shoot her. Frank notices just in time and jumps in front of Rachel. He gets shot, and Rachel holds him in her arms, uttering the famous line, "Let him go, he's my bodyguard!".

Frank returns to the mansion sometime later, still recovering from a shot to the arm. Frank shares a tender goodbye with Fletcher and Rachel, who kisses him goodbye as they presumably go on another tour with a new bodyguard ("I Will Always Love You").

=== Encore ===
After the final bows, the entire cast returns on stage to perform a spectacular rendition of the song "I Wanna Dance With Somebody".

== Productions ==
=== West End (2012–2014) ===
The Bodyguard's premiere production opened in London's West End on 5 December 2012, following previews at the Adelphi Theatre from 6 November 2012. The production which initially was booking until April 2013, opening cast included Grammy and Tony Award winner Heather Headley as Rachel Marron, Lloyd Owen as Frank Farmer and Debbie Kurup as Nicki Marron. Ray Shell created the role of Bill Devaney, Rachel Marron's manager. A month after opening, booking was extended until 28 September 2013. Headley departed the show at the start of August with her alternate Gloria Onitiri taking over the role short term until 7 September 2013. From 9 September the show's first major cast change took place with soul artist Beverley Knight taking over the role of Rachel Marron and Tristan Gemmill as Frank Farmer. The show initially extended to March after Knight took over but later extended booking to 30 August 2014. In March 2014, producers announced that The X Factor winner Alexandra Burke would take over from Knight on 2 June. A typical London performance runs two hours and 25 minutes, including one interval of 20 mins.

The show closed at the Adelphi Theatre on 29 August 2014, to make way for Made in Dagenham having come to the end of its contract with the theatre. Commenting on the closure, producer Michael Harrison said, "We always knew we would have to leave the Adelphi to make way for another show and we looked at length for an alternative theatre as the business has been phenomenal. The only other theatre we could have moved to, and we rang more numbers than you could imagine, had 300 less seats. It's a big show, there are nearly 30 people in the company, a 10-piece orchestra, automation, more computers and technical staff than you can imagine, so it can't just run cheap and cheerfully like certain other West End shows."

=== UK, Ireland and Monaco tour (2015–2016) ===
A tour of the United Kingdom and Ireland commenced at the Mayflower Theatre, Southampton in February 2015. Producers created a new set for the touring production and added a new Whitney Houston song, Million Dollar Bill. The tour visited Glasgow, Aberdeen, Newcastle, Wolverhampton, Stoke-on-Trent, Bradford, Cardiff, Plymouth, Dublin, Bristol, Birmingham, Southend, Edinburgh, Nottingham, Sheffield, Oxford, Manchester, and Eastbourne. Alexandra Burke reprised her role as Rachel Marron from the West End production, with Pop Idol and Thriller – Live actress Zoe Birkett playing the role at matinee performances for the first half of the tour. Stuart Reid played Frank Farmer. After Zoe Birkett left the production, singer Carole Stennett played Rachel Marron at the matinee performances for the remainder of the tour. After its final performance in the United Kingdom, the tour was transferred to Monaco for a limited engagement from 23 to 26 June 2016 at the Grimaldi Forum.

=== Utrecht (2015–2017) ===
The first non-English production had its first try-out on 12 September 2015, in the Netherlands. The show played at the Utrecht Beatrix Theater and had its premiere on 27 September. This production was the first to use all-new costume, set, lighting and sound designs (with sound design by Gareth Owen). It also included the new song that was added to the show for the UK and Ireland tour.

Singer Romy Monteiro, who competed in the 2014 season of The Voice of Holland, was cast as Rachel Marron, with the role of Frank Farmer shared by Dutch actors Mark van Eeuwen and Dave Mantel. On 25 January 2016, producers announced actor Miro Kloosterman had joined the cast. From mid-February 2016 to January 2017, he shared the role of Frank Farmer with Van Eeuwen and Mantel.

Carolina Dijkuizen portrayed the role of Rachel's sister, Nicki Marron, until September 2016, after which singer Nurlaila Karim took over the role.

April Darby alternated the role of Rachel Marron with Monteiro, while understudies Samantha Klots and Tjindjara Metschendorp portrayed the role when both singers were unable to perform. In February 2017 Samantha Klots left the show and was replaced by Anne Apello as understudy Rachel Marron/Backing Vocal. In March 2017 Talita Angwarmasse joined the cast as alternate Rachel Marron.

The other main cast included former Nickelodeon presenter Patrick Martens and actor Ferry Doedens alternating the role of Sy Spector, Ruurt de Maesschalck and Mike Ho Sam Sooi alternating as Bill Devaney, model and actor Bram Blankestijn as The Stalker, Zjon Smaal as Tony Scibelli and Robbert van den Bergh as Ray Court (who, in this version, was slightly based on the character Spencer Reid from Criminal Minds). Roy Kullick assumed the role of Ray Court on 25 July 2016. Paul Donkers took over the role of Tony Scibelli at the end of September 2016. Donkers left the show again in May 2017, after which Zjon Smaal returned to portray Tony Scibelli, which he did until the final performance.

The show closed at the Beatrix Theatre on 16 July 2017 and was replaced by the Dutch production of On Your Feet. The sets and costumes were shipped to Madrid to be used for the Spanish production.

=== Cologne (2015–2017) ===
In November 2015 Bodyguard made its German debut in the Musical Dome in Cologne. The show ran until 2017 before moving to Stuttgart.

German singer and actress Patricia Meeden, who was a contestant of The Voice of Germany plays the role of Rachel Marron. Jürgen Fischer and alternately Jadran Malkovich portray Frank Farmer, and South African actress Tertia Botha plays Nicky Marron. The other main cast includes American musical actor Dennis Kozeluh as Bill Devaney, Jadran Malkovich as Sy Spector (Carsten Lepper is taking over as Sy Spector from March 2017), Tom Viehöfer as The Stalker, Christian Peter Hauser as Tony Scibelli and Michael Clauder as Ray Court.

=== West End Revival (2016–2017) ===
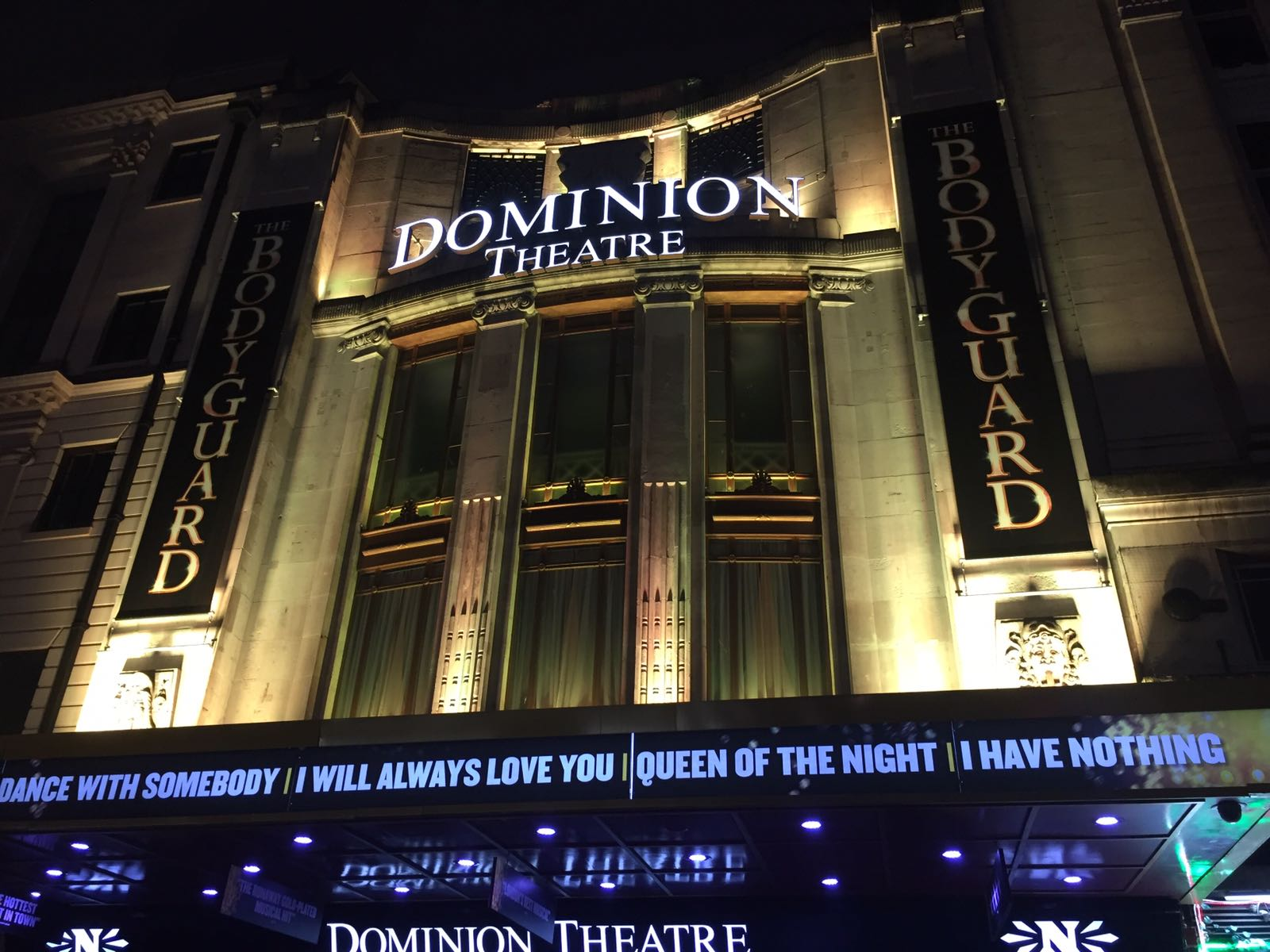
The Bodyguard at the Dominion Theatre

Following completion of the first UK tour, the production was scheduled to transfer to the West End's Dominion Theatre which had been running the musical made from Queen songs, "We Will Rock You", from 15 July 2016, booking for a limited run until 7 January 2017. Beverley Knight reprised her role as Rachel Marron and was joined by Ben Richards as Frank Farmer.

=== US tour (2016–2018) ===
On 15 May 2015, producers announced that the show would make its North American Debut in the Fall of 2016 at Paper Mill Playhouse in Millburn, New Jersey for previews. The National Tour would launch from the Orpheum Theatre in Minneapolis and would star Grammy-nominated singer Deborah Cox as Rachel Marron, and Judson Mills as Frank Farmer.

=== Seoul (2016–2017) ===
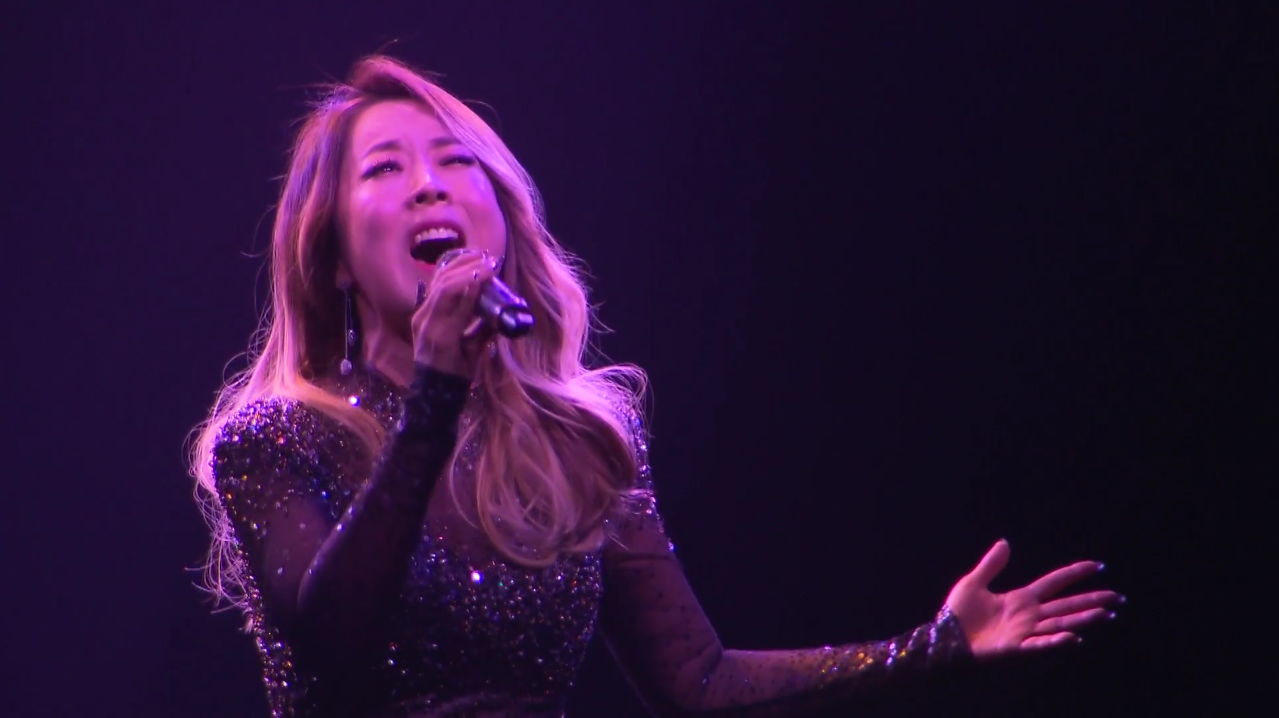
Yangpa as Rachel Marron

In December 2016, Bodyguard made its Korean debut in LG Arts Center in Seoul and it is first production in Far East country. The show will run until 5 March 2017.

Korean actress Jung Sun Ah, Korean Singer Yangpa and Son Seung Yeon will play the role of Rachel Marron. Lee Jong Hyuk and Park Sung Woong portray Frank Farmer and Choi Hyun Sun plays Nicki Marron. The other main cast includes Han Dong Gyu as Bill Devaney, Lim Ki Hong as Sy Spector, Lee Yool The Stalker, Jeon Jae Hyeon as Tony Scibelli and Kim Dae Ryeong as Ray Court. Fletcher will be played by Yoon Felix, Moon Seo Yoon and Lee Tae Kyung.

=== Toronto (2017) ===
Producers announced that Beverley Knight will play the role of Rachel in the Toronto production. Rachel John confirmed that the entire London Revival Cast will transfer with Beverley Knight. The production was planned to play short limited engagement from 11 February 2017, through 2 April 2017 at the Ed Mirvish Theatre. However, the limited engagement was extended by an extra week through 9 April 2017.

=== Australia (2017) ===
The Australian tour of the musical began in Sydney on 21 April 2017 at the Lyric Theatre, then moved on to Brisbane in July and Melbourne in August. The lead role was played by Paulini, while the Rachel Marron alternate was played by Emily Williams while Kip Gamblin portrayed Frank Farmer.

=== China tour (2017) ===
On 30 June 2017 an English language five-month China tour launched at the Shanghai Culture Square, with Carole Stennett as Rachel Marron and Stuart Reid as Frank Farmer.

=== Madrid (2017–2018) ===
A Spanish production ran from 28 September 2017 to 15 July 2018 at the Coliseum Theatre in Madrid, Spain. The show was produced by Stage Entertainment and starred Fela Domínguez as Rachel Marron, Iván Sánchez and Maxi Iglesias alternating as Frank Farmer, Damaris Martínez as Nicki Marron, Armando Buika as Bill Devaney, Alberto Cañas as Tony Scibelli, Juan Bey as Sy Spector, Javier Martínez as Ray Court, and Dani Tatay as the stalker (Tatay also played Frank Farmer when Maxi Iglesias left the company in January 2018). This staging of the show used the same new set and costume designs as the Dutch version.

=== Vienna (2018-2019) ===
German actor Jo Weil as Frank Farmer joined Patricia Meeden (from the Cologne production) as Rachel Marron at the Ronacher Theatre in Vienna, running from 27 September 2018 until summer of 2019. Ana Milva Gomes was cast as Nicki Marron and also played the role of Rachel Marron at certain performances.

=== UK, Ireland and Japan tour (2018–2020) ===
A second UK and Ireland tour started on 3 December 2018 at the Theatre Royal in Glasgow, with Alexandra Burke as Rachel Marron and Benoît Maréchal as Frank Farmer. From September to October 2019, the tour visited Tokyo and Osaka in Japan, before returning to the UK in November 2019. According to one of the musical's producer's David Ian, productions are planned for Broadway and the Far East.

=== Spanish tour (2019–2023) ===
A Spanish tour produced by LetsGo Company started on 17 December 2019 at the Teatro Olympia in Valencia, with Chanel Terrero and Khaoula Bouchkhi alternating as Rachel Marron and Octavi Pujades as Frank Farmer, but performances were cancelled from March 2020 as a result of the COVID-19 pandemic and its impact on the performing arts. The tour reopened on 27 November 2021 at the Teatre Coliseum in Barcelona and played its final performance on 12 March 2023 at the Teatro Circo in Albacete.

=== Poland (2020) ===
Despite the pandemic, the musical made its Polish debut on 27 September 2020. The Bodyguard was the opening show for the new Music Theatre Adria in Koszalin with the lead roles played by Filip Łach as Frank Farmer and Magdalena Łoś Wojcieszek as Rachel Marron. The other main cast included Urszula Laudańska as Nikki Marron, Daniel Klusek as Bill Devaney, Paweł Nowicki as Sy Spector and Leszek Andrzej Czerwiński as The Stalker.

=== UK and Ireland tour (2023–2024) ===
A third UK and Ireland tour kicked off on 28 January 2023 at the King's Theatre, Glasgow, starring Melody Thornton as Rachel Marron and Ayden Callaghan as Frank Farmer. On 6 April 2023, a debate was held on daytime television programme This Morning, in which presenters Alison Hammond, Vanessa Feltz and Dermot O'Leary discussed whether audience members should be allowed to sing along at musicals, after the venues in Glasgow and Manchester had installed signs requesting that audiences refrain from singing along. The following day, a performance of the show was cut short after several audience members refused to stop singing and were removed from the theatre by security staff. The incident sparked a wider debate regarding theatre etiquette in the British theatre industry.

=== Utrecht (2023) ===
On 7 December 2022, it was announced that musical would return to Utrecht for a limited run of five months, replacing the Dutch production of Tina: The Tina Turner Musical which had been playing at the Utrecht Beatrix Theater since 9 February 2020. Nyassa Alberta, who had been playing the lead role of Tina Turner in that production, is set to star as Rachel Marron. Tarikh Janssen will play Frank Farmer. Janssen is the first Black actor to play the role of Farmer in a production of The Bodyguard.

On 18 January 2023 it was announced that Nurlaila Karim will reprise her role as Nicki Marron from the earlier Dutch production. Juneoer Mers, who played Ike Turner opposite Nyassa Alberta in the Dutch production of Tina: The Tina Turner Musical, will play Sy Spector. Dieter Spileers will play Tony Scibelli, Steven Roox will play Ray Court and Marlon David Henry will play the role of the Stalker. Noah Blindenburg will play the role of Devaney, a gender flipped version of the Bill Devaney character. This marks the first time the role has been played by a woman.

This production mostly used the same sets and wig/costume designs from the earlier Dutch production, but did include some new costumes for the characters of Rachel and Nikki that better reflected modern fashion. Some of the wigs were also redone to resemble more natural Afro hair styles.

The show had its premiere on 24 March 2023 and last performance on 27 August 2023.

=== UK and international tour (2025–2026) ===
A fourth UK and international tour started on 20 September 2025, at the Alexandra Theatre in Birmingham, with Sidonie Smith as Rachel Marron and Adam Garcia as Frank Farmer, and ended on 4 October 2026, at the National Palace of Culture in Sofia.

=== North American tour (2026–present) ===
A non-equity tour kicked off on 15 October 2026, at the Stranahan Theater in Toledo, Ohio, starring Brooke Bailey as Rachel Marron and Jonathan Blansfield as Frank Farmer.

== Musical numbers ==
=== Original London production ===
Act I

- "Queen of the Night" - Rachel and Ensemble
- "I'm Your Baby Tonight" - Rachel, Fletcher and Ensemble
- "Oh Yes" - The Stalker and Rachel
- "Saving All My Love for You" - Nicki
- "Saving All My Love for You" (Reprise) - Nicki
- "So Emotional" - Rachel, DJ and Ensemble
- "Run to You" - Rachel and Nicki
- "How Will I Know" - Karaoke Girls
- "I Will Always Love You" (Dolly Parton Version) - Frank
- "I Have Nothing" - Rachel and Nicki

Act II

- "All the Man That I Need" - Rachel and Ensemble
- "I'm Every Woman" - Rachel and Ensemble
- "All at Once" - Nicki
- "Jesus Loves Me" - Nicki, Fletcher and Rachel
- "Jesus Loves Me" (Reprise) - Rachel and Ensemble
- "One Moment in Time" - Rachel
- "I Will Always Love You" (Whitney Houston Version) - Rachel
- "I Wanna Dance with Somebody" - Company

=== UK tour and international productions ===
Act I

- "Queen of the Night" - Rachel and Ensemble
- "How Will I Know" - Rachel, Fletcher and Ensemble
- "Greatest Love of All" - Rachel
- "Saving All My Love for You" - Nicki
- Mayan Medley: "Million Dollar Bill"/"I Wanna Dance with Somebody"/"So Emotional" - Rachel Marron and Ensemble
- "Run to You" - Rachel and Nicki
- "Where Do Broken Hearts Go" - Karaoke Girls
- "I Will Always Love You (Dolly Parton Version)" - Frank
- "I Have Nothing" - Rachel

Act II

- "All the Man That I Need" - Rachel and Ensemble
- "I'm Every Woman" - Rachel and Ensemble
- "All at Once" - Nicki
- "Run to You" (Reprise) - Rachel
- "Jesus Loves Me" - Fletcher, Nicki and Rachel
- "Jesus Loves Me" (Reprise) - Ensemble
- "One Moment in Time" - Rachel
- "I Will Always Love You" (Whitney Houston Version) - Rachel
- "I Wanna Dance with Somebody" - Company

== Orchestra ==
The musical uses a ten-member orchestra consisting of 3 keyboards, 2 guitars, bass guitar, drums, percussion, trumpet/flugel and woodwind (tenor saxophone, flute, clarinet & ewi in B♭). The 2023 and 2025 UK tours have cut the orchestra down to just six: two keyboards, two guitars, bass guitar and drums.

== Principal roles and cast ==
Characters	West End (2012)	UK tour (2015)	West End (2016)	US tour (2016)	UK tour (2018)	UK tour (2023)	UK tour (2025)	US Tour (2026)
Rachel Marron	Heather Headley	Alexandra Burke	Beverley Knight	Deborah Cox	Alexandra Burke	Melody Thornton	Sidonie Smith	Brooke Bailey
Frank Farmer	Lloyd Owen	Stuart Reid	Ben Richards	Judson Mills	Benoît Maréchal	Ayden Callaghan	Adam Garcia	Jonathan Blansfield
Nicki Marron	Debbie Kurup	Melissa James	Rachel John	Jasmin Richardson	Micha Richardson	Emily-Mae	Sasha Monique	Andrea Simpson
Bill Devaney	Ray Shell	Mensah Bediako	Mark Holden	Charles Gray	Peter Landi	John Macaulay	John Macaulay	Anthony S. Goolsby
Tony Scibelli	Nicolas Colicos	Siôn Lloyd	Alex Andreas	Alex Corrado	Craig Berry	Graham Elwell	Jonathan Alden	Keyshawn Brian Steele
Sy Spector	Sean Chapman	Adam Venus	Dominic Taylor	Jonathan Hadley	Gary Turner	James Groom	Matt Milburn	Riki Stevens
The Stalker	Mark Letheren	Mike Denman	Matthew Stathers	Jorge Paniagua	Phil Atkinson	Marios Nicolaides	James-Lee Harris	Ethan Hall
Ray Court	Oliver Le Sueur	Glen Fox	Glen Fox	Jarid Faubel	Simon Cotton	Fergal Coghlan	Ryan Bennett	

Notable West End replacements

- Rachel Marron – Beverley Knight, Alexandra Burke
- Frank Farmer – Tristan Gemmill
- Tony Scibelli – Stephen Marcus

Notable 2018 UK tour replacements

- Frank Farmer – Ben Lewis

Notable 2023 UK tour replacements

- Rachel Marron – Zoe Birkett, Emily Williams

== Critical reception ==
The West End performance of The Bodyguard has received generally positive reviews from critics. Paul Coltas of Time Out opens his critique on a positive: "There is surely an excruciatingly tacky musical adaptation of the Whitney Houston-starring romantic thriller 'The Bodyguard' to be made. But this is not it." Charles Spencer of The Daily Telegraph echoes Coltas’ initial reservations in the opening of his review but ultimately praises the director's work (Thea Sharrock), saying "Her production, spectacularly and ingeniously designed by Tim Hatley, is far more enjoyable than the movie."

Libby Purves of The Times described it as giving "throbbing new life to that thin story, half gig, half thriller." Best of Theatre commented on the stage adaptation saying "There is no denying that these songs really are some of the most energetic and catchy pop songs ever written and they have been cleverly weaved into the narrative of the musical", and London Theatre's writer, Peter Brown praised the overall production despite the character and stories stating "I found Thea Sharrock's production incredibly slick in terms of the design and functionality, and the singing and songs are great. But overall, I felt a little disappointed with the lack of character and story detail."

There were also some negative critics including Michael Billington from The Guardian, who said that the musical was "one more example of the necrophiliac musical morbidly attracted to a cinematic corpse".

== Awards and nominations ==
=== Original London production ===
Year	Award Ceremony	Category	Nominee	Result
2013	Laurence Olivier Award	Best New Musical		Nominated
2013	Laurence Olivier Award	Best Actress in a Musical	Heather Headley	Nominated
2013	Laurence Olivier Award	Best Performance in a Supporting Role in a Musical	Debbie Kurup	Nominated
2013	Laurence Olivier Award	Best Set Design	Tim Hatley	Nominated
2013	Evening Standard Award	Best Night Out		Nominated
