= Temara Melek =

American singer (born 1998)

- Born: May 4, 1998 (age 28); Loveland, Colorado, U.S.
- Education: Fashion Institute of Design & Merchandising
- Occupations: Singer; actress
- Years active: 2011–present
- Website: temaramelek.com

Temara Melek Ellinger (born May 4, 1998) is an American singer and actress. She made cameos and has appeared as a guest star on several TV shows including Modern Family (2010), The Vampire Diaries (2017), Westworld (2018) and Legacies (2019). She released her debut single "Karma's Not Pretty" in 2013.

== Early life and career ==
Temara Melek was born May 4, 1998, to mother Tiffany Ellinger. She is the sister of actor Tarik Ellinger and Taylor Ellinger. Temara started singing at the age of four. At a young age, her family relocated to California. Temara attended Oak Park Independent High School where she graduated 1 year early to attend the Fashion Institute of Design & Merchandising where she studied fashion design and merchandising.

Melek released her first music video for the song "Pour It On Sweet" in 2011. She later released an extended play (EP) titled Main Attraction in 2012, and it got nominated for a Los Angeles Music Awards in the category of Pop Album of the Year. Later, Melek worked with Cassadee Pope, former lead singer of Hey Monday and winner of the third season of The Voice, and they wrote the song "Karma's Not Pretty" which was released as her debut single. The song itself reached No. 8 in the UK's Most Watched Music Video charts, and No. 10 in the VIVA online charts and was reviewed by OK! Magazine, MTV, The Independent, Huffington Post, Teen magazine, Girl Talk and The Hits Radio FM. This song also earned her the Academia Music Award for Best Pop Song in the 2013 ceremony. The music video for this single featured Pretty Little Liars actors Gregg Sulkin and Keegan Allen. The attention garnered from "Karma's Not Pretty", led to her being selected by American singer Demi Lovato's production staff to appear as a guest at her first live streamed concert in October 2013.

In 2014, Melek was a part of Macy's iHeartRadio Rising Star talent search. During the same year, she collaborated with on DJ Antoine and Mad Mark, providing vocals for their song "Go With Your Heart", which charted in several European charts, including in Germany, Switzerland and Belgium. In 2015, she released her second solo single "Fingerprints", and the music video was exclusively released on RyanSeacrest.com. Two years later, in 2017, she released a single titled "Playing With Fire".

In the Summer of 2019, Melek started working with new songwriters and producers, and released "Privacy", which was described to be a 'glimmering pop' track. In 2020, she released a single called "Crash".

== Musical influences and style ==
Temara's musical style has been compared to Katy Perry. Her musical influences are Little Mix, Cheryl Cole, Miley Cyrus and Ariana Grande.

== Discography ==
=== Extended plays ===
| Title | Notes |
|---|---|
| Main Attraction | Released: May 23, 2012; Label: Self-released |

=== Singles ===
| Title | Year | Peak chart positions | | Album |
| Title | Year | CHE | GER | Album |
|---|---|---|---|---|
| "Karma's Not Pretty" (Note: "Karma's Not Pretty" originally appeared on Melek's debut EP Main Attraction, but the EP was later removed from all streaming services.) | 2013 | — | — | Non-album singles |
| "Fingerprints" | 2014 | — | — | Non-album singles |
| "Playing With Fire" | 2017 | — | — | Non-album singles |
| "Privacy" | 2019 | — | — | Non-album singles |
| "Crash" | 2020 | — | — | Non-album singles |
| "Jekyll & Hyde" | 2025 | — | — | Non-album singles |
| "Secret Santa" | 2025 | — | — | Non-album singles |
| "Freakshow" | 2026 | — | — | Non-album singles |
| "Disappearing Act" | 2026 | — | — | Non-album singles |
As a featured artist
| "Go With Your Heart (feat. Temara Melek & Euro)" (Note: Song by DJ Antonio vs. Mad Mark) | 2014 | 50 | 10 | The Time Is Now |

=== Promotional singles ===
| Title | Year | Album |
|---|---|---|
| "Pour It On Sweet" | 2011 | Non-album promotional singles |
| "Cali Skies" | 2012 | Non-album promotional singles |
| "Paperheart" (Note: "Paperheart" was released in 2016 exclusively on Soundcloud. But later, Melek released the song for free as a Holiday gift for her fans on her website.) | 2019 | Non-album promotional singles |

== Filmography ==
=== Film ===
| Year | Title | Role | Notes |
|---|---|---|---|
| 2006 | Standing Tall at Auschwitz | Child on a train | Documentary |
| 2011 | Scary Girl | Herself | Short film |
| 2012 | 16-Love | Girl in pool | Cameo role |
| 2018 | Christmas Everlasting | Cookie Party Coordinator | Uncredited role |

=== TV shows ===
| Year | Title | Role | Notes |
|---|---|---|---|
| 2006 | Why Can't I Be You? | Birthday Girl | One episode; 1.16 |
| 2010 | Modern Family | Dance Attendee | One episode; Dance Dance Revelation |
| 2011 | The Doctors | Daughter | One episode; 30 Ways to Heal Yourself Without a Doctor |
| 2011 | World Music Awards 2011 | Herself | |
| 2011–2012 | On The Spot | Herself | Documentary short |
| 2013–2017 | Teens Wanna Know | Herself | Two episodes |
| 2016 | Astrid Clover | Bethany | One episode; Speed Dating |
| 2017 | The Vampire Diaries | Mystic Falls Student | One episode; We Have History Together |
| 2018 | Westworld | Townswoman | One episode; The Passenger |
| 2018–2019 | Legacies | Salvatore Witch / Kissing Girl | Two episodes |

=== Music videos ===
| Title | Year | Artist | Director(s) | Ref. |
|---|---|---|---|---|
| "Pour It On Sweet" | 2011 | Herself | None credited | |
| "Main Attraction" | 2012 | Herself | None credited | |
| "Cali Skies" | 2012 | Herself | None credited | |
| "Karma's Not Pretty" | 2013 | Herself | None credited | |
| "Fingerprints" | 2014 | Herself | Josh Forbes | |
| "Playing With Fire" | 2017 | Herself | None credited | |
| "Pregame" | 2022 | Niki DeMar | Nayip Ramos | |

== Awards and nominations ==
| Award | Year | Work | Category | Result |
|---|---|---|---|---|
| LA Music Awards | 2013 | Main Attraction | Pop Album of The Year | Nominated |
| Academia Music Award | 2013 | "Karma's Not Pretty" | Best Pop Song | Won |
