= Alex Andreas (English actor) =

English actor

Alex Andreas (formerly Alex Andrea) (born 9 September 1970) is an English actor/singer. He trained at the London School of Musical Theatre (LSMT), and is probably best known for his portrayal on stage of The Big Bopper in The Buddy Holly Story, between 1996–2001, in Hamburg, Germany, and on tour in the UK. He is currently playing Tony Scibelli in The Bodyguard Musical UK No. 1 Tour.

Before Andreas did his formal training at LSMT, he worked as a bodyguard for The Gap Band and Eurythmics. After leaving LSMT, Andreas went on to play The Big Bopper in The Buddy Holly Story. He then went on to work in film and television, including Snatch. Some of his television credits include the BBC comedy My Hero and the Channel 4 show Make My Day.
