= The Prince (upcoming film) =

- Directed by: Cameron Van Hoy
- Written by: David Mamet
- Produced by: Scott Haze; Cameron Van Hoy; Sean Wolfington; Jo Henriquez; Lije Sarki
- Starring: Scott Haze; Nicolas Cage; J. K. Simmons; Giancarlo Esposito; Andy García; Simon Rex; Wayne Brady; George Newbern; Beverly D'Angelo
- Music by: Chris Egan & Laurent Eyquem
- Production company: Manor House Films
- Country: United States
- Language: English

The Prince is an upcoming American drama film directed by Cameron Van Hoy, written by David Mamet, and starring Scott Haze.

== Plot ==
According to The Guardian, the film "will refract aspects of Hunter Biden’s life through proxy Parker Scott".

== Cast ==
- Scott Haze as Parker
- Nicolas Cage as The Pimp
- J. K. Simmons
- Giancarlo Esposito
- Andy García
- Simon Rex
- Wayne Brady
- George Newbern
- Beverly D'Angelo
- Inanna Sarkis
- Paul Cassell
- Courtnee Carter

== Production ==
In June 2024, it was announced that Haze, Cage, Simmons, Esposito and Garcia were cast in the film. In July that same year, it was announced that Rex, Sarkis, Brady, Newbern, D'Angelo, Cassell and Carter were cast in the film.

In August 2024, it was announced that the film is in post-production.
