= Nyaru =

BAC
- Location within Kenya
- Coordinates: 0.33°N 35.58°E
- Country: Kenya
- Province: Rift Valley Province
- Time zone: UTC+3 (EAT)

Nyaru is a settlement in Kenya's Rift Valley Province. It is located in Elgeyo-Marakwet County's Keiyo South Constituency, precisely 45.6 km from Eldoret Town on the Eldoret-Eldama Ravine road. At the moment, Nyaru has the head offices of Keiyo South Constituency CDF (Constituency Development Fund).
