= Ben Feldman =

American actor (born 1980)

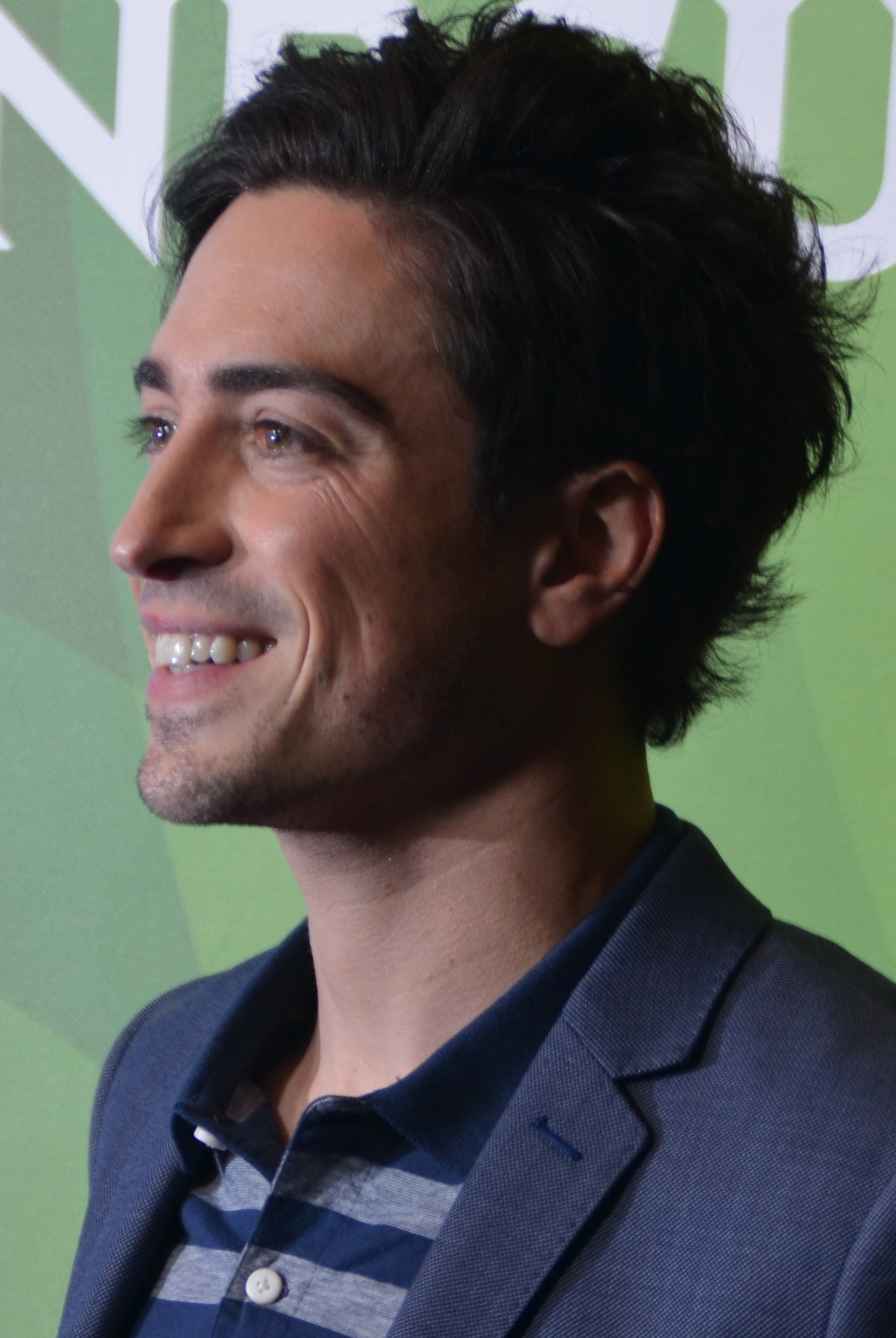
- Feldman at NBCUniversal's Summer TCA Tour in 2014
- Born: Benjamin Feldman; May 27, 1980 (age 46); Washington, D.C., U.S.
- Education: Ithaca College (BFA)
- Occupation: Actor
- Years active: 2003–present
- Spouse: Michelle Mulitz (m. 2013)
- Children: 2

Benjamin Feldman (born May 27, 1980) is an American actor. Throughout his career, he has undertaken roles on stage, including the Broadway play The Graduate, along with more prominent roles in television series such as his role as Jonah Simms in the NBC sitcom Superstore (2015–2021), Michael Ginsberg in Mad Men (2012–2014) which earned him a Primetime Emmy Award nomination, Ron LaFlamme in Silicon Valley (2014–2019), and Kyle Rosenblatt in Ghosts (2025–present). He has also played lead characters in films including The Perfect Man (2005).

== Early life and education ==
Feldman was born on May 27, 1980, in Washington, D.C. and raised in the district's Chevy Chase neighborhood. His mother is Marcia Muir Mitchell, a writer, and his father is Robert "Bob" Feldman, who runs a Maryland advertising agency. His stepmother is Kris Feldman, a realtor. Feldman is from a Jewish family and attended Conservative Jewish and Orthodox Jewish synagogues and schools. He has a sister, Morgan Leiter, who works in fashion. His aunt through his stepmother, Susan Feniger, is a chef in Los Angeles.

He was involved in acting camp and school theater from the age of 6. He attended Winston Churchill High School in Potomac, Maryland and graduated with the class of 1998. He worked as a camp counselor in the theater and taught a videography class for several summers in Bethesda, and attended Ithaca College in Ithaca, New York, where he received a Bachelor of Fine Arts in acting.

After graduating, he moved to New York City, where he performed on Broadway and eventually moved to Los Angeles to act in film and television.

== Career ==
Feldman played Josh Reeves in the TV series Living with Fran for two seasons from 2005 to 2006. From 2009 to 2011, he was a regular on the television series Drop Dead Diva in the role of guardian angel Fred before leaving the series at the start of the fourth season. In April 2012, he joined the cast of AMC's Mad Men as a regular, playing the character Michael Ginsberg. He also appeared as lawyer Ron LaFlamme on HBO's Silicon Valley from 2014 to 2019, and from 2015 to 2021 he played the lead Jonah Simms in the NBC sitcom Superstore. He also produced Superstore from 2019 to 2021. In 2021, he began starring as Tylor Tuskmon in Disney's Monsters at Work.

In 2024, Feldman was nominated for a Logie Award for his work on the Stan Australia series Population 11.

=== Other pursuits ===
Feldman is co-owner of a wine label, Angelica Cellars.

== Personal life ==
Feldman lives in Los Angeles. In 2012, he became engaged to Michelle Mulitz. They were married on October 12, 2013, at Smokey Glen Farm in Gaithersburg, Maryland. The couple have two children; a son born in 2017 and a daughter born in 2019.

== Filmography ==
=== Film ===
| Year | Title | Role | Notes |
|---|---|---|---|
| 2005 | When Do We Eat? | Zeke | |
| 2005 | The Perfect Man | Adam Forrest | |
| 2008 | Cloverfield | Travis Marello | |
| 2008 | Extreme Movie | Len | |
| 2009 | Friday the 13th | Richie | |
| 2011 | Limited | Chernin | Short film |
| 2012 | Sluts, Bitches and Whores! | Dan | Short film |
| 2012 | Departure Date | Young Jake | Short film |
| 2013 | Crystal Lake Memories: The Complete History of Friday the 13th | Himself | Documentary film |
| 2014 | As Above, So Below | George | |
| 2015 | 400 Days | Bug Kieslowski | |
| 2016 | Between Us | Henry | |
| 2017 | Thumper | Jimmy | |
| 2023 | A Tourist's Guide to Love | John | |
| 2024 | Junk | Jayson | |

=== Television ===
| Year | Title | Role | Notes |
|---|---|---|---|
| 2003 | Less than Perfect | Nicholas | Episode: "Rules" |
| 2003 | Frozen Impact | Paramedic | TV movie |
| 2003 | The Mayor | Jake Winterhalter | TV movie |
| 2005–2006 | Living with Fran | Josh Reeves | 26 episodes |
| 2007 | Numbers | Seth Marlowe | Episode: "Graphic" |
| 2007 | Them | Floyd Grunwald | TV movie |
| 2007 | Can Openers | Mike | TV movie |
| 2008 | Las Vegas | Herbert | 2 episodes |
| 2008 | The New Adventures of Old Christine | Timmy | Episode: "The New Adventures of Old Christine" |
| 2009 | See Kate Run | Dan Carver | TV movie |
| 2009 | Medium | Justin Lydecker | 3 episodes |
| 2009 | CSI: Crime Scene Investigation | Jason Devereaux | Episode: "Working Stiffs" |
| 2009–2014 | Drop Dead Diva | Fred | 38 episodes |
| 2011 | Love Bites | Sam | Episode: "Stand and Deliver" |
| 2012–2014 | Mad Men | Michael Ginsberg | 29 episodes Nominated – Primetime Emmy Award for Outstanding Guest Actor in a Drama Series (2012) |
| 2013 | Major Crimes | Jason Andrews | Episode: "Under the Influence" |
| 2013 | The Mindy Project | Jason Richmond | 2 episodes |
| 2014–2015 | A to Z | Andrew Lofland | 13 episodes |
| 2014–2019 | Silicon Valley | Ron LaFlamme | 13 episodes |
| 2015 | Childrens Hospital | Leo Richie | Episode: "Home Life of a Doctor" |
| 2015–2021 | Superstore | Jonah Simms | Main cast, 113 episodes; also produced 36 episodes and directed episodes "Lottery" and "Carol's Back" |
| 2017 | Hollywood Game Night | Himself | Episode: "Super Duper Store Night" |
| 2017 | The Kellyanne Conway Story | Mike Pence | |
| 2019 | Lip Sync Battle | Himself | Episode: "Ben Feldman vs. Lauren Ash" |
| 2019–2020 | Big Hero 6: The Series | Chris | Voice; 9 episodes |
| 2021–2022 | Tuca & Bertie | | Voice; 2 episodes |
| 2021–2024 | Monsters at Work | Tylor Tuskmon | Voice; main cast |
| 2022 | Super Pumped | Larry Page | Episodes: "War" and "The Charm Offensive" |
| 2023 | American Auto | Chase Brody | Episode: "Going Green" |
| 2024 | Population 11 | Andy Pruden | Main cast, 12 episodes; also executive producer |
| 2024–2025 | Common Side Effects | Nick | Voice; recurring role |
| 2025 | Mayfair Witches | Sam Larkin | Series regular |
| 2025 | I Love LA | Jeremy | Episode: "They Can't All Be Jeremys" |
| 2025–present | Long Story Short | Avi Schwooper | Voice; main cast |
| 2025–present | Ghosts | Kyle | Recurring role (seasons 4-5); main role (season 6) |
