= Lio Tipton =

American actor and model (born 1988)

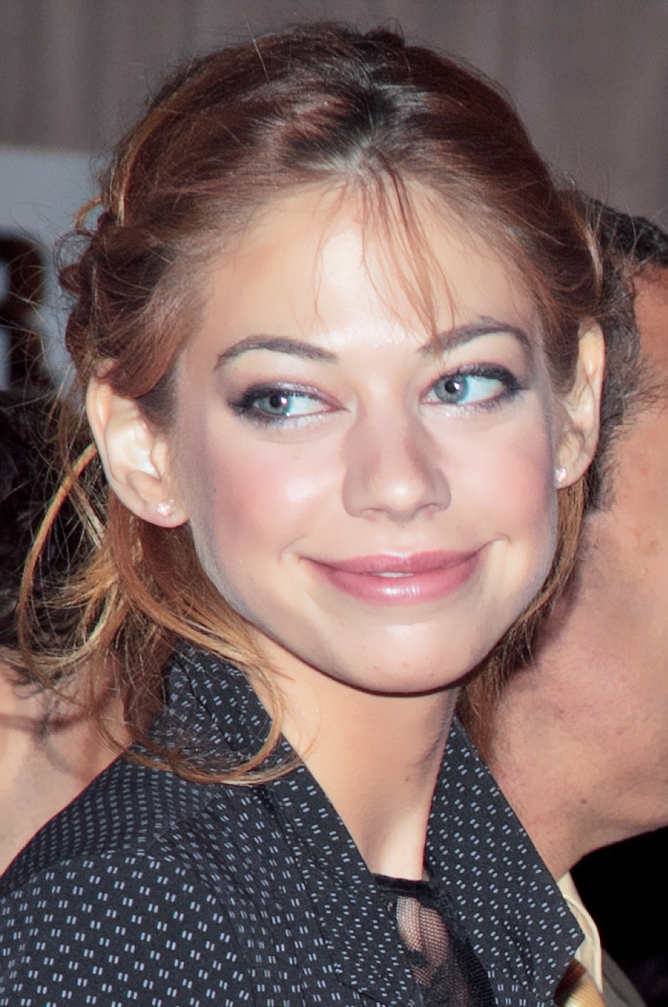
- Tipton at the 2011 Toronto International Film Festival
- Born: Analeigh Tipton; November 9, 1988 (age 37); Minneapolis, Minnesota, U.S.
- Education: Marymount College
- Occupations: Actor; model
- Years active: 2008–present
- Spouse: Chaz Salembier (m. 2022)
- Modeling information
- Height: 5 ft 9.5 in (177 cm)
- Hair color: Brown
- Eye color: Blue
- Agency: Ford Models

Lio Tipton (formerly Analeigh Tipton; born November 9, 1988) is an American actor and fashion model. Tipton was the last contestant eliminated on Cycle 11 of America's Next Top Model and played roles in the films Crazy, Stupid, Love (2011), Warm Bodies (2013), and Two Night Stand (2014).

== Early life ==
Tipton was born in Minneapolis, Minnesota. They (Note: Tipton is non-binary and uses they/them pronouns.) began ice skating at two and a half years old. When Tipton was eight, their family relocated to Sacramento, California and they went to school in Placerville, California.

Tipton competed in four U.S. Synchronized Skating Championships. They and their pair partner, Phillip Cooke, twice became regional champions, and competed twice at the U.S. Junior Figure Skating Championships on the Juvenile level. Tipton retired from competitive skating at 16 but continued to skate in charity ice shows for AIDS foundations and to rebuild a rink damaged in a fire.

They attended Marymount California University in Rancho Palos Verdes, California.

== Career ==
=== Modeling ===
Prior to America's Next Top Model, Tipton was signed to I Model & Talent in Los Angeles and walked in Los Angeles Fashion Week for designer Kelly Nishimoto's Fall 2008 collection, Imasu.

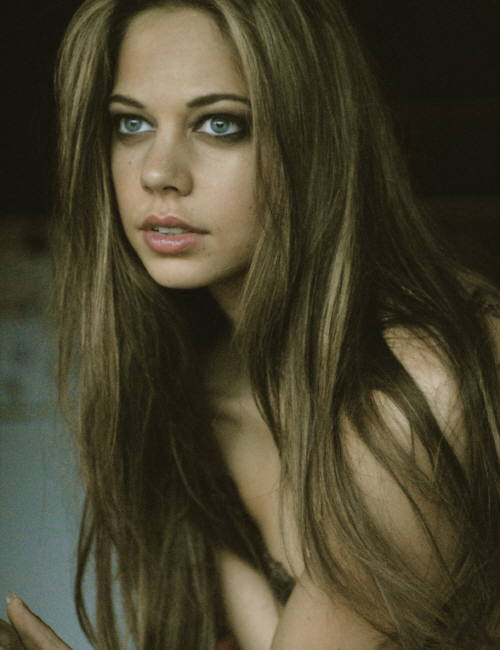
Tipton in 2008

Tipton was the second contestant selected (after eventual All Stars contestant, Sheena Sakai) for the top fourteen to compete on the reality television show America's Next Top Model Cycle 11 in 2008. They were recruited through MySpace and asked to audition in Los Angeles. Tipton received two first call-outs, one of which was the first CoverGirl commercial, which Tyra Banks deemed "the best CoverGirl commercial in the history of America's Next Top Model." They also won the go-sees challenge by booking all three of their go-sees and getting back on time. They also appeared twice in the bottom two where they first survived over Brittany Rubalcaba and were subsequently eliminated twelfth in the finale after forgetting their lines in the second CoverGirl commercial, which left Samantha Potter and McKey Sullivan to walk in the finale runway show.

Tipton signed with Ford Models in Los Angeles and Abrams Artists Agency, in both the commercial and theatrical divisions. They appeared in Spain's Marie Claire, Seventeen magazine's December 2008–January 2009 edition, a several-page spread in Maxim, and in Vogue. They were also featured in ads for Forever 21 and Guess.

In 2010, they modeled Geren Ford's pre-fall 2010 collection. For Los Angeles Fashion Week, they walked for Skingraft and David Alexander for the S/S 2010 season.

=== Acting ===
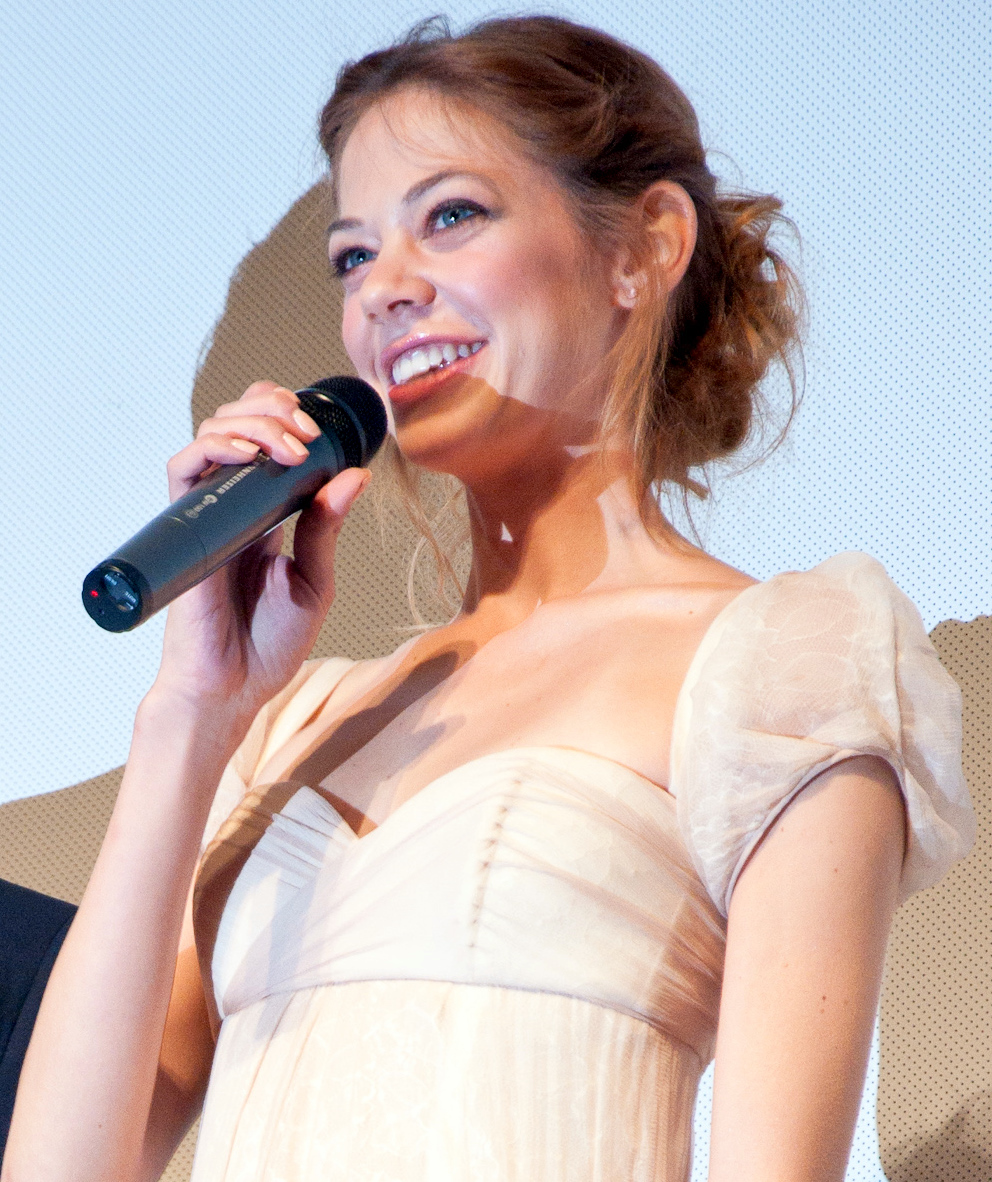
Tipton at the 2011 Toronto International Film Festival

Tipton appeared with Samantha Potter as guest stars on an episode of the television series The Big Bang Theory in 2008 and by themself in a different role in 2015. Tipton played a babysitter who has a crush on Steve Carell's character in Crazy, Stupid, Love, prompting The New York Times to call them a "face to watch".

Tipton was cast in the third season of HBO's TV comedy Hung, portraying Sandee, a young gigolo's scheming fiancée. They played a supporting role in the zombie-apocalyptic horror-romance Warm Bodies, directed by Jonathan Levine. They had a small role opposite Scarlett Johansson in the 2014 science fiction action film Lucy. They had their first lead role in Two Night Stand, directed by Max Nichols, which was released on September 26, 2014.

In 2014, Tipton was the co-lead in ABC's short-lived comedy series Manhattan Love Story.

In 2018, Tipton played Avery's date, Lauren, on the revival of Murphy Brown (S1:E7, "A Lifetime of Achievement").

== Personal life ==
Tipton announced in June 2021 that they are queer and non-binary, and use they/them pronouns. Tipton married entertainment executive Chaz Salembier in October 2022.

== Filmography ==
Key
†	Denotes works that have not yet been released

=== Film ===
Year	Title	Role	Notes
2011	The Green Hornet	Ana Lee	
2011	Crazy, Stupid, Love	Jessica Riley	
2011	Damsels in Distress	Lily	
2013	Warm Bodies	Nora	
2013	The Power Inside	Ashley	
2014	Buttwhistle	Rose	
2014	4 Minute Mile	Lisa Rickard	
2014	Lucy	Caroline	
2014	Two Night Stand	Megan Pagano	Main role
2015	Mississippi Grind	Vanessa	
2016	Between Us	Veronica	
2016	Viral	Stacey Drakeford	
2016	In Dubious Battle	Vera	
2016	Compulsion	Sadie Glass	
2017	Golden Exits	Jess	
2017	All Nighter	Ginnie	
2018	Better Start Running	Stephanie	
2018	Broken Star	Markey	
2019	Summer Night	Mel	Last film credited as Analeigh Tipton
2022	In Space with Markiplier	Lady	
2022	Vengeance	Abilene Shaw	
2022	Continue	Bria	
2023	Riddle of Fire	Anna-Freya Hollyhock	
2025	Love Hurts	Ashley	

=== Television ===
Year	Title	Role	Notes
2008	America's Next Top Model	Themself	Last eliminated in cycle 11
2008	The Big Bang Theory	Themself	Episode: "The Panty Piñata Polarization"
2011	Hung	Sandee	8 episodes
2014	Manhattan Love Story	Dana Hopkins	Main role
2015	Limitless	Shauna	Episode: "The Legend of Marcos Ramos"
2015	The Big Bang Theory	Vanessa Bennett	Episode: "The Mystery Date Observation"
2018	Murphy Brown	Lauren	Episode: "Lifetime of Achievement"
2019	Why Women Kill	Mary Vlasin	3 episodes; last television credit as Analeigh Tipton
2022	A Friend of the Family	Gail Berchtold	
2024	The Edge of Sleep	Katie Dowd	

=== Music videos ===
Year	Title	Artist
2012	"Constant Conversations"	Passion Pit
