= Ahna O'Reilly =

American actress (born 1984)

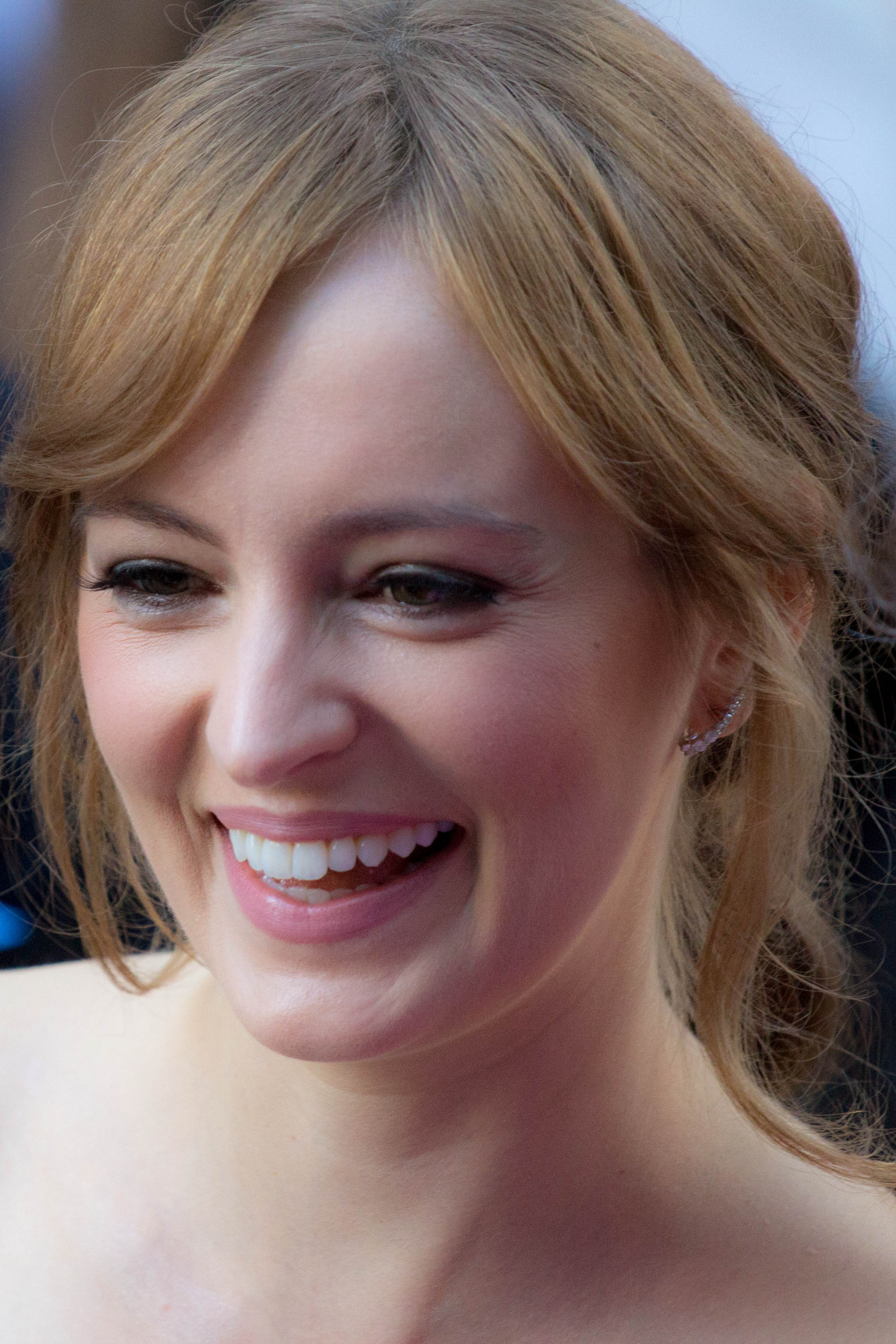
- O'Reilly in 2016
- Born: September 21, 1984 (age 42)
- Occupation: Actress
- Years active: 2003–present
- Spouse: Dave Andron (m. 2020)

Ahna O'Reilly (born September 21, 1984) is an American actress. She is best known for her roles in the films The Help (2011) and Fruitvale Station (2013).

== Early life and career ==
O'Reilly graduated from Menlo School in 2003 and attended the University of Southern California for one year before dropping out.

After graduating, O'Reilly began her acting career in 2003 in the film, Bill the Intern. She has appeared in several other movies like Dinocroc, Nancy Drew, Just Add Water and Forgetting Sarah Marshall. She also acted in television series like CSI: NY, Unhitched, The Vampire Diaries and Prime Suspect.

In 2011, she appeared in the film The Help based on Kathryn Stockett's best-selling novel of the same name, a period piece set in Jackson, Mississippi, in the 1960s. The film opened to positive reviews and became a box-office success with a worldwide gross of $211,608,112. It also won several ensemble awards including National Board of Review Award, Screen Actors Guild Award and Satellite Award. O'Reilly co-starred in the 2013 film Jobs, alongside Ashton Kutcher and Josh Gad, about the life of technology pioneer Steve Jobs.

In 2016, she appeared in the Roundabout Theatre Company off-Broadway production of The Robber Bridegroom. A cast recording featuring O'Reilly in her role as Rosamund was released on September 9, 2016.

In 2017, O’Reilly starred as Sarah Foster in the film Sleepwalker.

== Personal life ==
She dated actor James Franco for a time before the two broke up in 2011. In December 2021 O'Reilly announced via Instagram that she married writer and producer Dave Andron a year earlier, in secret.

== Filmography ==
=== Film ===
Year	Title	Role	Notes
2003	Bill the Intern	Actress	
2004	Dinocroc	Beach-Goer	
2007	Succubus: Hell-Bent	Bikini Babe	
2007	Good Time Max	Girl Jumping on Bed	
2007	Nancy Drew	'No' Woman	
2008	Forgetting Sarah Marshall	Leslie	
2008	Just Add Water	Tammy	
2009	The Harsh Life of Veronica Lambert	Maya	also known as 5 Nights in Hollywood
2009	Herpes Boy	Christeee	
2010	House Under Siege	Lana	
2011	0s & 1s	Caitlin	
2011	Girls! Girls! Girls!	N/A	
2011	The Help	Elizabeth Leefolt	Black Film Critics Circle Award for Best Ensemble; Black Reel Award for Best Ensemble; Broadcast Film Critics Association Award for Best Cast; Hollywood Film Festival Award for Ensemble of the Year; National Board of Review Award for Best Cast; Satellite Award for Best Cast – Motion Picture; Screen Actors Guild Award for Outstanding Performance by a Cast in a Motion Picture; Southeastern Film Critics Association Award for Best Ensemble; Women Film Critics Circle Award for Best Ensemble; Nominated — Detroit Film Critics Society Award for Best Ensemble; Nominated — San Diego Film Critics Society Award for Best Performance by an Ensemble; Nominated — Washington D.C. Area Film Critics Association Award for Best Ensemble
2011	From the Head	Lily	
2012	I Am Ben	Max	
2012	The Time Being	Olivia	
2013	Miss Dial	Concerned Pet Owner	
2013	CBGB	Mary Harron	
2013	The Big Ask	Zoe	
2013	Fruitvale Station	Katie	
2013	Jobs	Chrisann Brennan	
2013	As I Lay Dying	Dewey Dell Bundren	
2013	Lucky Them	Charlotte	
2014	Get On Up	Reporter	
2014	The Sound and the Fury	Caddy Compson	
2015	She's Funny That Way	Former Prostitute	
2015	No Way Jose	Dusty Morrison	
2015	I Am Michael	Laura	
2016	Elvis & Nixon	Mary Anne Peterson	
2016	In Dubious Battle	Edith "Edie" Malone	
2016	All I See Is You	Carla	
2017	Marshall	Mrs. Richmond	
2017	Sleepwalker	Sarah	
2017	Big Bear	Jess	
2017	Totem	Robin	
2018	Spivak	Tammy Gordon	
2019	Our Friend	Gale	
2019	Bombshell	Julie Roginsky	
2022	Where the Crawdads Sing	Ma	

=== Television ===
Year	Title	Role	Notes
2008	CSI: NY	Halie	Episode: "Happily Never After"
2008	Unhitched	Blind Hostess	Episode: "Conjoined Twins Pitch No-Hitter"
2011	The Vampire Diaries	Jessica Cohen	Episode: "The Descent"
2011	Prime Suspect	Emma	Episode: "Shame"
2013	Call Me Crazy: A Five Film	Bethany	Television film
2014	How I Met Your Mother	Kelly	Episode: "How Your Mother Met Me"
2017	Kingdom	Amy	4 episodes
2018	Reverie	Rachel Kauffman	Episode: "Bond. Jane Bond."
2019	The Morning Show	Ashley Brown	2 episodes
2019	Bull	Erin Flemming	Episode: "Imminent Danger"
2023	Justified: City Primeval	Officer Charlene Gerret	Episode: "The Question"
2025	Bodkin	Amber Power	2 episodes
