= John Matysiak =

American cinematographer

- Born: Houston, Texas, U.S.
- Occupation: Cinematographer
- Years active: 2006 - Present

John Matysiak is an American cinematographer. He is known for his work on the film Old Henry (2021) and the second season of the HBO series Winning Time: The Rise of the Lakers Dynasty (2023). He has also contributed to music videos for artists, including Post Malone and Leon Bridges.

== Life and career ==
Matysiak pursued a Bachelor of Arts in Film Production from Emerson College in Boston, Massachusetts, in addition to studying abroad at the Czech National Film School (FAMU) in Prague.

In 2016, Matysiak was brought aboard as cinematographer for the second season of Still the King, where he met showrunner Potsy Ponciroli. In 2020, he and Ponciroli reunited for the film Old Henry (2021), starring Tim Blake Nelson and Stephen Dorff.

Most recently Matysiak and Ponciroli teamed up again on the 1970s action film Motor City, starring Alan Ritchson, Ben Foster and Shailene Woodley.

== Selected filmography ==
=== Film and television ===
- 2012: Model Minority
- 2012: Two Shadows
- 2014: Stuck
- 2016: Still the King (11 episodes)
- 2021: Old Henry
- 2022: Acidman
- 2022: Meet Cute
- 2023: Big George Foreman
- 2023: Winning Time: The Rise of the Lakers Dynasty
- 2025: Motor City
- 2027: The Rescue

=== Music video ===
- 2016: Kings of Leon: "Walls"
- 2018: Leon Bridges: "Beyond"
- 2019: Miranda Lambert: "It All Comes Out in the Wash"
- 2024: Post Malone: "I Had Some Help"

== Awards and nominations ==
Year	Result	Award	Category	Work	Ref.
1997	Won	Los Angeles Asian Pacific Film Festival	Best Cinematography - Narrative Feature	Two Shadows	
