= Hidalgo (film) =

2004 film by Joe Johnston

- Theatrical release poster
- Directed by: Joe Johnston
- Written by: John Fusco
- Produced by: Casey Silver
- Starring: Viggo Mortensen; Omar Sharif; Saïd Taghmaoui
- Cinematography: Shelly Johnson
- Edited by: Robert Dalva
- Music by: James Newton Howard
- Production companies: Touchstone Pictures; Casey Silver Productions
- Distributed by: Buena Vista Pictures Distribution
- Release date: March 5, 2004
- Running time: 136 minutes
- Countries: United States; United Kingdom
- Language: English
- Budget: $100 million
- Box office: $108.1 million

Hidalgo is a 2004 American-British epic biographical Western film directed by Joe Johnston and written by John Fusco. Based on the legend of American distance rider Frank Hopkins and his mustang Hidalgo, it recounts Hopkins racing his horse in Arabia in 1891 against Bedouins riding pure-blooded Arabian horses. The film stars Viggo Mortensen, Zuleikha Robinson, and Omar Sharif.

Hidalgo was released by Buena Vista Pictures Distribution under the Touchstone Pictures label on March 5, 2004. Upon release, the film received mixed reviews and underperformed at the box office, grossing $108.1 million against a budget of $100 million.

== Plot ==
In 1890, Frank T. Hopkins and his mustang, Hidalgo, are part of Buffalo Bill's Wild West show, advertised as "the world's greatest endurance horse and rider". A famous long-distance racer, cowboy, and dispatch rider for the United States government, Hopkins is plagued by guilt for having carried a message to the 7th Cavalry Regiment authorizing the Wounded Knee Massacre of Lakota Sioux. He translates a futile request from another performer, Chief Eagle Horn, for Bill to help his nation's mustangs that have been rounded up by the government to be eradicated.

Wealthy Sheikh Riyadh sends his attaché Aziz, accompanied by Rau Rasmussen, to challenge Hopkins and Hidalgo to enter the "Ocean of Fire", an annual 3,000-mile race across the Najd desert region for a $100,000 prize. The sheikh is custodian of the al-Khamsa line, considered the greatest distance horses in the world, and traditionally the race has been restricted to pure-bred Arabian horses and Bedouin or Arab riders. Hopkins' fellow performers raise his entrance fee, and he encounters unscrupulous English horse breeder Lady Anne Davenport. He meets Sheikh Riyadh, an admirer of the Wild West, who has promised his daughter Jazira as the fifth wife to Prince Bin Al Reeh, who rides the Sheikh's horse Al-Hattal, should he win.

The race begins, and Hopkins and Hidalgo face gruelling conditions and contempt for an "infidel" riding an "impure" horse, and survive sabotage and a sandstorm. Determined to live her own life, Jazira advises Hopkins on surviving in the desert, but they are discovered together in his tent. The sheikh prepares to have Hopkins gelded as punishment, but his outcast nephew Katib raids the camp, seeking control of the al-Khamsa line. The prince flees on Al-Hattal, but Aziz steals the sheikh's family journal of horse breeding for Katib, who kidnaps Jazira and demands Al-Hattal as ransom.

Hopkins rescues Jazira, who recovers the journal. Journeying back to camp, Hopkins reveals that his mother was Lakota Sioux, deepening his guilt over his role at Wounded Knee. Jazira compares his relationship to his heritage with her desire to avoid wearing the veil, urging him not to "go through life hiding what God made you." Davenport bribes Hopkins to drop out of the race, but he declines her offer and her advances toward him. Unbeknownst to him, Davenport is in league with Katib; they plan to kill Hidalgo and steal Al-Hattal, allowing her mare to win the race and breed with the sheikh's horse.

Enduring a swarm of locusts, Hopkins remembers Jazira's advice, and Hidalgo and he resort to eating them. Although helping other riders is forbidden, he saves his opponent, Sakr, from quicksand. Hopkins is ambushed by Katib and falls into a trap, severely injuring Hidalgo, and is rescued by Sakr. They fight off Katib's men, but Sakr is shot, and Hopkins kills Katib in one of his own traps. Hidalgo collapses, and Hopkins considers shooting him in mercy, but a vision of Lakota elders and his mother appears to him as he chants a prayer to Wakan Tanka.

The prince arrives and taunts Hopkins that the end of the race is in sight, and Hidalgo suddenly struggles upright. Riding bareback, Hopkins comes from behind to surpass Davenport's mare and the prince, winning the race. He befriends the sheikh, giving him his revolver, and bids farewell to an unveiled Jazira, who calls him by his Lakota name, Blue Child. Returning to the United States, Frank uses his winnings to buy the mustangs from the government, releasing them into the wild and freeing Hidalgo to join them. An epilogue reveals that Hopkins went on to reportedly win 400 long-distance races and was an outspoken supporter of wild mustangs until his death in 1951, while Hidalgo's descendants live free in the wilderness of Oklahoma.

== Cast ==
- Viggo Mortensen as Frank Hopkins, a noted long-distance rider.
- Zuleikha Robinson as Jazira is the determined daughter of the sheikh.
- Omar Sharif as Sheikh Riyadh is an insightful leader, who owns and breeds Arabian horses of the Al Khamsa bloodline.
- Louise Lombard as Lady Anne Davenport, a British aristocrat who bets her horse against Hopkins.
- Adam Alexi-Malle as Aziz is the emissary and the sheikh's attaché.
- Saïd Taghmaoui as Prince Bin Al Reeh is the sheikh's chosen racer, who wishes to marry Jazira by force.
- Silas Carson as Katib is Jazira's cousin and leader of a group of brigands.
- Harsh Nayyar as Yusef
- J.K. Simmons as William "Buffalo Bill" Cody
- Adoni Maropis as Sakr is a falconer and one of Hopkins' fellow racers.
- Victor Talmadge as Rau Rasmussen
- Peter Mensah as Jaffa is Jazira's personal guard.
- Joshua Wolf Coleman as the Kurd
- Franky Mwangi as Slave Boy
- Floyd Red Crow Westerman as Chief Eagle Horn is a member of Hopkins' Lakota nation, performing with him in the Wild West show.
- Elizabeth Berridge as Annie Oakley
- C. Thomas Howell as Preston Webb
- Todd Kimsey as Corporal at Wounded Knee
- Malcolm McDowell as Major Davenport (Uncredited)
- David Midthunder as Black Coyote

== Production ==
Actor Viggo Mortensen, who is fluent in Spanish, voiced his own character (Frank Hopkins) in the Latin American dubbing of the film.

Johnny Depp revealed during a sworn testimony at his defamation trial against Amber Heard that Disney's parent company Touchstone Pictures offered him the lead role in Hidalgo, but after reading the screenplay, he turned it down, saying, "I just didn't think it was for me." Instead, Depp asked Touchstone's parent company Disney for a more family-friendly, cartoon-like role, and Disney then offered him the role of Jack Sparrow.

== Toys ==
Breyer Animal Creations produced a line of model horses inspired by the film.

== Historical accuracy ==
Native American historian Vine Deloria questioned Hopkins' claims of Lakota ancestry, as presented uncritically in the film.

Nakota filmmaker Angelique Midthunder said during the controversy, though, that "the story of the half Indian who took his pinto mustang across the sea to race in the big desert has been told to children of the northern plains tribes for generations." Lakota elder Sonny Richards writes, "Kaiyuzeya Sunkanyanke (Frank Hopkins) was a South Dakota native and Lakota half-breed."

Based on Hopkins' account of his mixed-race ancestry, the film's production employed Lakota historians, medicine men, and tribal leaders as consultants to advise during every scene that represented their culture. Many of the Ghost Dancers who re-enact the sacred ceremony of 1890 in Hidalgo had participated in the film Thunderheart (1992) and the miniseries Dreamkeeper, both written by Fusco. The screenwriter was adopted as an honorary relative of the Oglala Nation in a hunkyapi ceremony (Making of Relatives) on September 3, 1989, on the Pine Ridge Indian Reservation.

Because the Disney Corporation marketed the film as a true story, some historians criticized the film both because of the legendary status of Hopkins' claims and for the film's divergence from his accounts. They contend that many of the events, especially the featured race, never took place. Historians of distance riding said that most of Hopkins' claims as depicted in the film, including the race, have been "tall tales" or hoaxes.

The film says that descendants of the horse Hidalgo, for which the film was named, live among the Gilbert Jones herd of Spanish mustangs on Blackjack Mountain in Oklahoma. By Hopkins' original account, he decided to leave his horse in Arabia after the race.

In 2006, John Fusco, the screenwriter of Hidalgo, responded to criticism about the historical basis of the film. He had done research on Hopkins for years. He said that he used parts of Hopkins' 1891 desert memoirs (unpublished during the rider's lifetime) and "heightened the 'Based On' story to create an entertaining theatrical film." He held that the story of the man and his horse is true. Fusco offered quotes from surviving friends of Hopkins', notably former distance riders Walt and Edith Pyle, and Lt Col William Zimmerman, along with information found in horse history texts, as verification.

According to the Longriders Guild, the Saudi Arabian government said officially that "Ocean of Fire" race had never occurred. Hopkins never named the event; he referred to it in his writings as an annual ceremonial ride in the region. According to Arab historian Dr. Awad al-Badi, such a lengthy race was impossible. He said,

There is no record or reference to Hopkins with or without his mustangs ever having set foot on Arabian soil. The idea of a historic long-distance Arab horse race is pure nonsense and flies against all reason. Such an event in Arabia any time in the past is impossible simply from a technical, logistical, cultural, and geopolitical point of view. It has never been part of our rich traditions and equestrian heritage.

== Horses ==
Several American Paint horses were used to portray Hidalgo. Actor Viggo Mortensen later bought RH Tecontender, one of the horses used in the film. Screenwriter John Fusco bought Oscar, the main stunt horse, and retired him at Red Road Farm, his American Indian horse conservancy. Another one was bought by a ranch near Toponas, Colorado.

== Reception ==
=== Critical response ===
Hidalgo received mixed reviews from mainstream critics. Rotten Tomatoes gives the film an approval rating of 46% with an average rating of 5.5/10, based on reviews from 162 critics. The critical consensus reads, "The scenery looks great, but this overstuffed horse story contains too much cheese". Metacritic gives the film a weighted average score of 54 out of 100 based on reviews from 36 critics, indicating "mixed or average" reviews. Audiences polled by CinemaScore gave the film an average grade of "A-" on A+ to F scale.

Roger Ebert offered a positive review of the film (three out of four stars), saying it's "Bold, exuberant and swashbuckling," the kind of fun, rip-snorting adventure film Hollywood rarely makes anymore. He added, "please ignore any tiresome scolds who complain that the movie is not really based on fact. Duh." Eleanor Ringel Cater of The Atlanta Constitution gave the film a B, stating that the film "certainly has its problems, but they're outweighed by the simple pleasures of a picture that takes its cue equally from old-fashioned adventures like Gunga Din and newfangled ones like The Mummy." Gemma Tarlach of Milwaukee Journal Sentinel gave it a two-and-a-half out of four rating, calling it "an entertaining but far-short- of-epic popcorn romp that's equal parts Indiana Jones and The Last Samurai."

=== Box office ===
The film grossed about $18,829,435 on its opening weekend, peaking at number three behind The Passion of the Christ and Starsky and Hutch in 3,065 theatres. It closed from theatres on July 22, 2004, with $67.3 million in North America, and $40.8 million internationally. The film made a worldwide total of $108.1 million.

== Accolades ==
John Fusco won the Spur Award for Best Western Drama Script; although most of the plot of Hidalgo was not set in the American West, it featured an American cowboy figure.

== See also ==
- List of films about horse racing
