= Joel Bergvall =

Swedish filmmaker

- Occupations: Narrative Strategist, filmmaker, media executive
- Employers: Down Home; Shareability

Joel Bergvall is a Swedish-American filmmaker, media executive, and narrative strategist. He first gained international recognition with the short film Victor (1998), co-directed with Simon Sandquist, which was nominated for an Academy Award for Best Live Action Short Film, and the feature film Den Osynlige (The Invisible, 2002), which was critically acclaimed, screened internationally, won multiple festival awards, and was later remade in the United States by Spyglass Entertainment and Disney.

He has worked in documentary, narrative features, and branded entertainment, and currently serves as Head of Film and Television for Down Home, a Nashville based media venture founded by Tim McGraw in partnership with the Los Angeles based media company Shareability, where Bergvall is a partner, and backed by Skydance.

== Early life and career ==
Bergvall grew up in Sweden, where he developed an early interest in storytelling and media. His early creative work included poetry published in the Swedish youth magazine Glöd in 1990 and 1991. Throughout the 1990s he worked professionally as a documentary filmmaker and journalist, producing and directing non-fiction programs for Swedish broadcasters, educational organizations, and production companies.

Bergvall’s early documentary work received recognition at Sweden’s Golden Slate Awards (Guldklappan) and Golden Antenna (Guldantennen), with honors for 4 dagar 4 liv (1996), Förvandlingen (1997), Himlatornet (1997), Pejling EMU (2000), and Omtanke (2000). This period established the narrative and structural approach that informed his later transition into feature filmmaking and narrative strategy.

During this period his documentary material was broadcast in Swedish current affairs programs covering social issues, conflict, and contemporary political themes in conflict regions such as Bosnia, Croatia, Pakistan, Afghanistan, Israel, and the Palestinian territories.

== Narrative filmmaking ==
By the late 1990s, Bergvall had begun working in scripted films alongside his documentary work, applying structural and character-driven methods developed in non-fiction to dramatic storytelling.

His first scripted film, Victor (1998), co-directed with Simon Sandquist, received an Academy Award nomination for Best Live Action Short Film and won the Film Bird Award at the Uppsala International Short Film Festival. The film’s reception brought Bergvall into international feature development.

His next project was the Swedish feature The Invisible (Den Osynlige, 2002), co-directed with Simon Sandquist. The film was critically acclaimed, screened internationally, won multiple festival awards, and was later remade in the United States by Spyglass Entertainment and Disney. Released in 2007, The Invisible (2007), directed by David S. Goyer, started the modern wave of American remakes of Swedish films, including Let Me In (2010), The Girl with the Dragon Tattoo (2011), and A Man Called Otto (2022).

=== Awards and recognition ===
- Victor
  - Academy Award nomination for Best Live Action Short Film
  - Film Bird Award, Uppsala International Short Film Festival
- The Invisible
  - Best Feature in international competition, Bend Film Festival
  - Five awards at Screamfest LA, including Best Feature, Best Cinematography, Best Editing, Best Actor (Gustaf Skarsgård), and Best Actress (Tuva Novotny)
  - Special Jury Award, Best Directorial Debut, Cinequest Film Festival
  - Audience Choice honorary mention, Flanders International Film Festival
  - Audience Award, Neuchatel International Fantastic Film Festival
  - Golden Tesa Film Roll, top prize at Hamburg Film Festival
  - Second Prize, Digiawards for digital excellence at Hamburg Film Festival
  - Finalist for Best Feature and Best European Feature, Hollywood Film Festival

These projects marked Bergvall’s transition from documentary into international feature filmmaking, and shaped the narrative approach he later applied in Hollywood development, branded entertainment, and narrative strategy.

=== Hollywood development and studio work ===
Bergvall moved into feature and studio work in the United States in the 2000s, writing and developing projects for Warner Bros, Fox, Sony, Disney, New Line Cinema, and other major studios. His work during this period spanned thriller, fantasy, and character-driven stories, often involving adaptations and high-concept material.

Some published development announcements include:

- Possession (earlier titled Addicted), directed by Bergvall and Sandquist, starring Sarah Michelle Gellar, released by Yari Film Group and 20th Century Fox Home Entertainment
- Books of Magic, based on the DC Comics/Vertigo property created by Neil Gaiman, developed at Warner Bros
- Fear Itself, a supernatural thriller developed for Intermedia
- Tunnels, an adaptation of the novel series by Roderick Gordon and Brian Williams for Relativity
- Fly or Die, an episodic concept developed for the Los Angeles based production company Converge and released via BitTorrent’s early digital initiatives

=== Additional commercial and broadcast work ===
During this period Bergvall co founded Picture Lab Entertainment, a production company focused on commercial, promotional, and broadcast content, including work tied to mixed martial arts events. His projects included Countdown to WFA: King of the Streets (2006), Shark Fights: The Countdown (2010), WMMA: Fighting for a Better World (2012), and promotional material for ProElite, EliteXC, and other U.S. fight organizations.

He also directed early digital and pilot content for emerging online platforms as part of his work with the Los Angeles based production company Converge. This included Ballerz (2011), a comedy pilot featuring Shaquille O’Neal with guest appearances by Carmen Electra, Adrian Peterson, and Justin Bieber.

This period marked his shift toward the digital first formats that later defined his branded entertainment career.

== Shareability and branded entertainment ==
From the mid 2010s, Bergvall expanded his work into digital and branded entertainment through Shareability, a Los Angeles based media company specializing in digital content and social distribution for global brands. As Partner and Chief Creative Officer, he contributed to the development and production of digital projects for companies such as AT&T, Ford, Mars, Intuit, Adobe, Hyatt, The Olympic Channel, Pizza Hut, and Pepsi.

This work included concept development, creative supervision, and production across a range of short form and mixed media formats. During this period he collaborated with public figures including Sylvester Stallone, Cristiano Ronaldo, Dua Lipa, John Cena, and Tim McGraw on content created for brand campaigns and audience growth.

Shareability produced a number of widely circulated digital campaigns during this time, and the company became known for combining data-informed creative development with celebrity-powered storytelling, using the power of social and digital to inform audience interests, using these insights to help guide their creative.

This period in branded entertainment and celebrity-powered digital formats contributed to Bergvall’s later involvement in larger media ventures, including the formation and growth of Down Home.

== Down Home ==
In 2023 Bergvall became Head of Film and Television for Down Home, a Nashville based media venture founded by Tim McGraw and Shareability, with backing from Skydance. The company develops film, television, and experiential projects connected to country music culture and contemporary American storytelling.

In this role, Bergvall oversees the company’s long form slate and works across development, packaging, and production. His work includes collaboration with studio partners such as Skydance and Paramount, and with artists and public figures involved in Down Home’s broader media initiatives. He also works directly with founders and other stakeholders to strategically define the company’s growth and development.

Down Home’s projects focus on scripted and experiential formats, including the feature film The Rescue, with Potsy Ponciroli directing and starring Brandon Sklenar, scheduled for wide theatrical release through Paramount Pictures on January 29, 2027. Bergvall is credited as an executive producer. Other projects include a television series for Netflix set in the rodeo world, developed with Skydance and announced in 2024 with Tim McGraw attached to star, and the television special America's Tailgate on CBS, co-produced with Skydance Sports, NFL Films, EverWonder Studio, and Lost Tribe Studio, on which Bergvall served as an executive producer for Down Home. In 2025 the company launched Music City Rodeo, a multi-night event at Nashville’s Bridgestone Arena that combined musical performances with rodeo competition, establishing the first arena-based PRCA rodeo event held in Nashville.

Bergvall’s work at Down Home further builds on his narrative strategy focus, including market strategy and how to make projects resonate with buyers.

== Narrative strategy ==
Alongside his work in film and media, Bergvall has worked extensively in narrative structure and communication strategy, drawing on experience from documentary, feature development, and branded entertainment. He has led storytelling workshops and training sessions for filmmakers, journalists, creative teams, and corporate groups, using a framework he developed through his career.

Over more than three decades he has applied this framework in educational and professional settings across journalism schools, media institutions, and corporate environments in Scandinavia, the United States, and other regions. His work in narrative design centers on story architecture, audience engagement, and the use of structured storytelling tools in different formats, all designed around audience alignment, specifically how to grab and hold audience attention. As he often puts it:

“Great ideas don’t win because they’re great. They win because they resonate with the people they’re meant for. That’s the through-line across story, brand, and venture: You have to make them care.”

== Speaking and teaching ==
Since the 1990s Bergvall has taught and presented on storytelling, dramatic structure, and narrative design in professional and educational settings. His early teaching work included sessions for journalism and media institutions in Europe.

He has also led workshops and lectures for corporate groups and creative teams, including training programs for broadcasters, production companies, and communications organizations. His instruction has focused on how narrative design helps develop storytelling across mediums, and engage audiences.

Beyond formal teaching, Bergvall has taken part in industry events, panel discussions, and executive training programs in the United States and internationally, with emphasis on narrative architecture and media strategy.

== Select Filmography ==
=== Narrative and Theatrical ===
==== Victor (1998) ====
Academy Award nominee for Best Live Action Short Film, and winner of the Film Bird Award at the Uppsala International Short Film Festival.

==== The Invisible (Den Osynlige, 2002) ====
Critically acclaimed Swedish feature film that screened internationally and received awards at Bend Film Festival, Screamfest LA, Cinequest, Neuchatel International Fantastic Film Festival, and the Hamburg Film Festival. Remade in the United States by Spyglass Entertainment and Disney.

==== Possession (Early title Addicted, 2009) ====
Psychological thriller directed by Bergvall and Sandquist, starring Sarah Michelle Gellar and Lee Pace, released by Yari Film Group and 20th Century Fox Home Entertainment.

=== Early Award Winning Documentary Work ===
==== 4 dagar 4 liv, 1996 ====
Third Prize, Golden Slate Awards (Guldklappan)

==== Förvandlingen, 1997 ====
Grand Prix and Best Documentary, Golden Slate Awards (Guldklappan)

==== Himlatornet, 1997 ====
Winner of the Golden Antenna (Guldantennen), Swedish Television’s Grand Prix

==== Pejling EMU, 2000 ====
Nominated for Best Educational Production, Golden Slate Awards (Guldklappan)

==== Omtanke, 2000 ====
Awards for Best Cinematography, Best Editing, Second Prize Best Production, and Honorary Mention for Best Screenplay at the Golden Slate Awards (Guldklappan)

=== Digital and early-format work ===
==== Ballerz (2011) ====
Scripted digital comedy pilot produced for Converge, featuring Shaquille O’Neal with appearances by Carmen Electra, Adrian Peterson, and Justin Bieber

==== Fly or Die (2013) ====
Episodic music-industry concept developed for Converge and released as part of BitTorrent’s early digital distribution initiatives

=== Select branded entertainment work ===
Through Shareability, Bergvall contributed to large-scale digital campaigns for global brands, working across concept development, creative oversight, and production. Projects were created for clients including:

- AT&T
- Ford
- Mars
- Intuit
- Adobe
- Hyatt
- The Olympic Channel
- Pizza Hut
- Pepsi

He has also collaborated with public figures on digital and social-first content, including:

- Sylvester Stallone
- Cristiano Ronaldo
- Dua Lipa
- John Cena
- Tim McGraw

These projects were produced for brand channels and talent platforms, with several receiving wide circulation during their release periods.
