= Frank Hopkins =

American horseman

Frank T. Hopkins
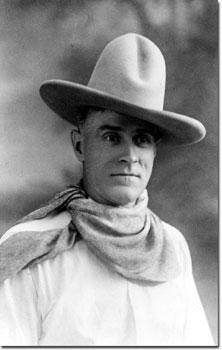
- (Photo taken in 1905)
- Born: August 11, 1865; Fort Laramie, Goshen County, Wyoming
- Died: November 5, 1951 (age 86); Middle Village, Queens County, New York

Frank T. Hopkins (August 11, 1865 unsubstantiated [some sources suggest he was born as late as 1885] – November 5, 1951) was a self-proclaimed professional horseman who at one time performed with the Ringling Brothers Circus. He was a long-distance rider who claimed to have won 400 races and was recognized by his contemporaries as supporting the preservation of the mustang.

Though the film Hidalgo was based on Hopkins' purported story, few items in his accounts have been verified by outside, reliable, third-party sources. Some experts consider him to be a con-artist.

== Early life and education ==
Hopkins said he was born to a Lakota mother, although this remains unsubstantiated, and European-American father, that he grew up in both cultures, and that he learned to ride and care for horses at an early age. He claimed that his father, Charles Hopkins, was a scout for George Armstrong Custer and was captured by Chief Gall in the Battle of the Little Bighorn, but he was released four months later and returned to Fort Laramie, which is where Frank said he was born and raised (his father being with Custer cannot be substantiated). The Fort Laramie National Historic site has no record of his birth or family. There is a marriage certificate that Hopkins signed in New York in 1929 where his age was put at 44 which, if true, would place his birth in 1885. The Lakota Nation has no record of any member of his family being enrolled or associated with the nation.

== Career ==
Hopkins claimed to have been a cowboy and professional horseman in the American West, where he gained a reputation for distance riding. In his autobiographical memoir (unpublished in his lifetime) and accounts to friends, he claimed to have been featured as one of the "Rough Riders of the World" in Buffalo Bill's Wild West show, which toured in Europe as well as the United States.

A number of his stories have been debunked by many historians. Examples include:

- His claim to have been a rider with Buffalo Bill's Wild West Show was disputed by the curator of the Buffalo Bill Historical Center, who said Hopkins' name is nowhere to be found in the archives. Hopkins has been found as listed in 1917 as being employed by the Ringling Brothers Circus as a horse handler.
- His claim to have brought 'trick riding' to Buffalo Bill's Wild West Show has been disputed by the Georgian Cossack expert, Irakli Makharadze.
- His claim of being Native American, specifically Lakota, is not only unsubstantiated but the Lakota Nation has no record of him or his mother and does not claim either as members or any association.

In 1926, Hopkins was foreman of a construction crew, digging a subway tunnel in downtown Philadelphia, Pennsylvania.

In the 1940s, Hopkins claimed he was honorary chair at a Vermont Races, though the Vermont Historical Society has no knowledge of any races in Vermont. Hopkins also claimed to have won a Texas-to-Vermont endurance race at age 21, riding an 800-pound buckskin, but there is no evidence in contemporary sources that such a race was ever held. Up to the time of his death in 1951, he remained an outspoken champion of the threatened mustang which he called "the most significant animal on the North American continent."

== Death ==
Frank Hopkins is interred in Lutheran All Faiths Cemetery in Middle Village, Queens County, New York.

== In popular culture ==
Hopkins' accounts of his life and the story of the race in Arabia were the inspiration for the 2004 film Hidalgo, written by John Fusco, directed by Joe Johnston, and starring Viggo Mortensen. The film marketed that it was "based on a true story" although subsequent investigations failed to find any evidence of such a race. Lakota scholar, historian and doctor Vine Deloria says "Hopkins' claims are so outrageously false that one wonders why the people were attracted to this material at all."
