= Blackjack Mountain =

Blackjack Mountain may refer to:

- Blackjack Mountains, Arizona
- Blackjack Mountain (Carroll County, Georgia)
- Blackjack Mountain (Oklahoma)
- Snow River Mountain Resort (Bessemer, Michigan), used to be called Blackjack Resort
