= O (2001 film) =

2001 American romantic drama film by Tim Blake Nelson

- Theatrical release poster
- Directed by: Tim Blake Nelson
- Screenplay by: Brad Kaaya
- Based on: Othello by William Shakespeare
- Produced by: Daniel Fried; Eric Gitter
- Starring: Mekhi Phifer; Josh Hartnett; Julia Stiles; Elden Henson; Andrew Keegan; Rain Phoenix; Anthony A.J. Johnson; John Heard; Martin Sheen
- Cinematography: Russell Lee Fine
- Edited by: Kate Sanford
- Music by: Jeff Danna
- Production companies: Daniel Fried Productions; Chickie the Cop
- Distributed by: Lions Gate Films (United States and Canada); Dimension Films (through Miramax International; International)
- Release date: August 31, 2001
- Running time: 94 minutes
- Country: United States
- Language: English
- Budget: $5 million
- Box office: $19.2 million

O is a 2001 American romantic thriller film directed by Tim Blake Nelson and written by Brad Kaaya. A modern adaptation of William Shakespeare's Othello set in an American high school, it stars Mekhi Phifer as the Othello-like character, with Josh Hartnett and Julia Stiles in supporting roles.

Originally intended for release on October 17, 1999, the film was delayed to August 31, 2001, following the Columbine High School massacre. O was released by Lions Gate Films in the United States and Canada and by Dimension Films (through Miramax International) in other territories. It received mixed reviews and grossed $19.25 million on a $5 million budget.

== Plot ==
During a high school basketball game, Odin James scores the basket that wins the game for his team. Later at an awards ceremony, coach Duke Goulding presents the Most Valuable Player award to Odin for his efforts, an award he shares with his teammate Michael Cassio. In giving Odin the award, Duke passes over his son Hugo, Odin's teammate and friend. At a party celebrating the victory, Hugo plots with school outcast Roger Calhoun to go to the school's dean, Bob Brable, and tell him that Odin had raped the dean's daughter, Desi, whom Odin has been dating. Hugo promises Roger that Desi will be his after Odin is out of the way, but Roger is only a pawn in Hugo's ultimate plan to destroy Odin.

Later, in another game, Odin's team wins once again. At the celebration party, Hugo engineers a fight between Roger and a very drunk Michael. This causes Michael to be suspended, and for Odin to refuse to speak to him. Hugo tells Michael to ingratiate himself with Desi so that she will talk to Odin on his behalf. Soon afterward, Hugo tells Odin that Michael and Desi have been spending a lot of time together, and that she may be cheating on him. Odin does not believe this at first, but gradually comes to suspect them. Odin questions Desi, but she calms him down and he believes her. Nevertheless, the stress of the situation drives Odin to begin using drugs.

Hugo manipulates his girlfriend Emily into stealing a scarf for him that Odin gave to Desi. Hugo, in turn, gives it to Michael in hopes that Odin will believe Desi gave Michael the scarf—furthering the notion that Desi is cheating on Odin.

Meanwhile, Odin and Desi are having sex at a motel, during which Odin sees an image of Michael on top of Desi in the mirror; angered, he becomes very rough with Desi, to the point that she cries out for him to stop, a plea he ignores as he continues to rape her. Afterward, they lie together staring in opposite directions.

After Odin assaults another student during a game in a drug-fueled rage, Hugo tells him about the scarf, convincing him that Desi is cheating on him. Enraged, Odin vows to kill her, and Hugo then promises he will kill Michael.

Hugo, Odin, and Roger make plans to kill both Michael and Desi. Hugo and Roger attempt to kill Michael in a carjacking, but it does not go as planned: Roger and Michael struggle, Hugo hits Michael with a crowbar, knocking him unconscious. Roger shoots Michael in the leg ruining the plan that it was supposed to look like a suicide, and then Hugo turns the gun on Roger and kills him after telling him that Desi is dead.

Odin and Desi are in Desi's room talking and Odin is pretending to make up with her. They are making out on the bed when suddenly Odin attacks her; Desi fights back, but he finally strangles her to death. Emily rushes into the room and sees Desi's body; she soon finds out what Hugo has done. She begins telling Odin that Hugo told her to steal the scarf and exposes his plot, but Hugo fatally shoots her when she refuses to be quiet. Odin finally realizes that Hugo has been manipulating him the entire time, and demands to know why; Hugo refuses to answer. When the police arrive, Odin tells them what happened in an emotional monologue and shoots himself, dying by suicide. As Hugo is taken into police custody, he says in voice-over that he will have his day in the spotlight.

== Cast ==
- Mekhi Phifer as Odin James (based on Othello)
- Josh Hartnett as Hugo Goulding (based on Iago)
- Julia Stiles as Desi Brable (based on Desdemona)
- Elden Henson as Roger Calhoun (based on Roderigo)
- Andrew Keegan as Michael Cassio (based on Michael Cassio)
- Rain Phoenix as Emily (based on Emilia)
- Martin Sheen as Coach Duke Goulding (based on the Duke of Venice)
- John Heard as Bob Brable (based on Brabantio)
- Anthony Johnson as Dell
- Rachel Shumate as Brandy (based on Bianca)

== Production ==
Screenwriter Brad Kaaya's inspiration for the script came from Shakespeare's Othello, "the spate of suburban school shootings that rocked the country in the 1980s", and his own experiences as a black teenager attending a largely white private school. Tim Blake Nelson came across the script while filming Terrence Malick's The Thin Red Line, and was offered the chance to direct based on his directorial debut Eye of God.

Filming began in Charleston, South Carolina in early 1999 and wrapped that March. Dimension Films, a division of Miramax, acquired the film two days into principal photography. Nelson received the offer to appear in O Brother, Where Art Thou? while he was making this film.

== Release ==
The official release date was initially October 17, 1999, but was postponed following the Columbine High School massacre in April of that year. The delay was likely due to the film's themes of sex and violence in high school, as suggested by its director. Another theory is that it was held back until after the 2000 U.S. presidential election. The film was initially due to be released by Miramax but the studio passed it to Lionsgate after O's producers sued for breach of contract.

The film was finally released theatrically on August 31, 2001.

== Reception ==
The film received mixed reviews. On Rotten Tomatoes, it has a 65% approval rating based on 124 reviews, with an average score of 6.1/10 and a consensus: "Though well-intentioned and serious in its exploration of teen violence, O is an uneven experiment that doesn't quite succeed". On Metacritic, the film achieved an average score of 53 out of 100 based on 26 reviews, signifying "mixed or average reviews".

Roger Ebert gave the film 3½ stars out of 4 and wrote O is "a good film for most of the way, and then a powerful film at the end, when, in the traditional Shakespearean manner, all of the plot threads come together." Ebert added, "Mekhi Phifer makes a strong, tortured Odin, and delivers a final speech, which in its heartbreaking anguish, inspires our pity much as Othello's does. Josh Hartnett showed here, years before 'Pearl Harbor,' that he is capable of subtleties and complexities that epic did not dream of." Mick LaSalle of the San Francisco Chronicle also gave a positive review, writing, "The result is that a tale of teen violence takes on qualities of timelessness and universality it would not otherwise possess, while the 'Othello' story leaps out with a rare immediacy."

Other reviews pointed out how the modern setting of a Shakespeare adaptation emphasizes the improbability of plot events. Todd McCarthy of Variety wrote, "In modernizing this shattering tale of love, jealousy, deceit and betrayal, screenwriter Brad Kaaya has been faithful to the play's emotions and plot mechanics, but these elements become burdens in a context that can't support them, with the result the drama’s extreme and tragic actions seem fatally under motivated." Desson Howe of The Washington Post positively cited the "hearty performances from Mekhi Phifer, Julia Stiles and Josh Hartnett", but wrote "Hugo's scheming comes across as convoluted and transparent."

== Awards ==
O was nominated for a Black Reel Award for Best Actor for Mekhi Phifer. Tim Blake Nelson also won the Golden Space Needle Award at the Seattle international Film Festival for Best Director.

== See also ==
- List of basketball films
