= Kate Sanford =

American television and film editor

- Born: U.S.
- Education: UC Berkeley
- Occupation: Editor
- Years active: 1994–present

Kate Sanford, ACE, is an American television and film editor. She is best known for her work on The Wire, Boardwalk Empire, and The Marvelous Mrs. Maisel.

== Career ==
Sanford began editing in 1994, with early work on Sex and the City. She gained significant recognition for her work on all five seasons of The Wire (2002–2008), created by David Simon, earning an American Cinema Editors Award for the episode "Boys of Summer" (2007). She also edited Treme (2010), another David Simon project, winning an American Cinema Editors Award for the episode "Do You Know What It Means", and Show Me a Hero (2015). She edited Boardwalk Empire (2010–2014), Vinyl (2016), The Deuce (2017–2019), and The Marvelous Mrs. Maisel (2017–present), receiving American Cinema Editors Awards for The Marvelous Mrs. Maisel. Her film credits include Eye of God (1997), O (2001), Brooklyn Rules (2007), Management (2008), and American Buffalo (1996). She is a member of American Cinema Editors, where she serves on the board of directors.

== Select filmography ==
=== Television ===
As Editor
Year	Title	Notes
1998	Sex and the City	3 episodes
2002-2008	The Wire	19 episodes
2010	Treme	3 episodes
2010-2014	Boardwalk Empire	28 episodes
2015	Show Me a Hero	3 episodes
2016	Vinyl	4 episodes
2017−2018	The Deuce	3 episodes
2017-2022	The Marvelous Mrs. Maisel	17 episodes
2024	We Were the Lucky Ones	3 episodes

=== Film ===
As Editor
Year	Title	Director	Notes
1996	American Buffalo	Michael Corrente	
1997	Eye of God	Tim Blake Nelson	
1999	Outside Providence	Michael Corrente	
2001	O	Tim Blake Nelson	
2007	Brooklyn Rules	Michael Corrente	
2008	Management	Stephen Belber	
2024	On Swift Horses	Daniel Minahan	

As Producer
Year	Title	Director	Notes
2017	The Surrounding Game	Will Lockhart; Cole Pruitt	

== Awards and nominations ==
Year	Result	Award	Category	Work	Ref.
2007	Won	American Cinema Editors Awards	Best Edited One-Hour Series for Non-Commercial Television	The Wire : "Boys of Summer"	
2009	Nominated	American Cinema Editors Awards	Best Edited One-Hour Series for Non-Commercial Television	The Wire : "More with Less"	
2011	Won	American Cinema Editors Awards	Best Edited One-Hour Series for Non-Commercial Television	Treme : "Do You Know What It Means"	
2012	Nominated	Hollywood Post Alliance	Outstanding Editing - Television	Boardwalk Empire : "Under God's Power She Flourishes"	
2019	Won	American Cinema Editors Awards	Best Edited Comedy Series for Non-Commercial Television	The Marvelous Mrs. Maisel : "Simone"	
2019	Nominated	Primetime Emmy Awards	Outstanding Picture Editing for a Single-Camera Comedy Series	The Marvelous Mrs. Maisel : "Simone"	
2020	Nominated	Primetime Emmy Awards	Outstanding Picture Editing for a Single-Camera Comedy Series	The Marvelous Mrs. Maisel : "A Jewish Girl Walks Into the Apollo..."	
