= Rising Falcon Cinema =

American production company

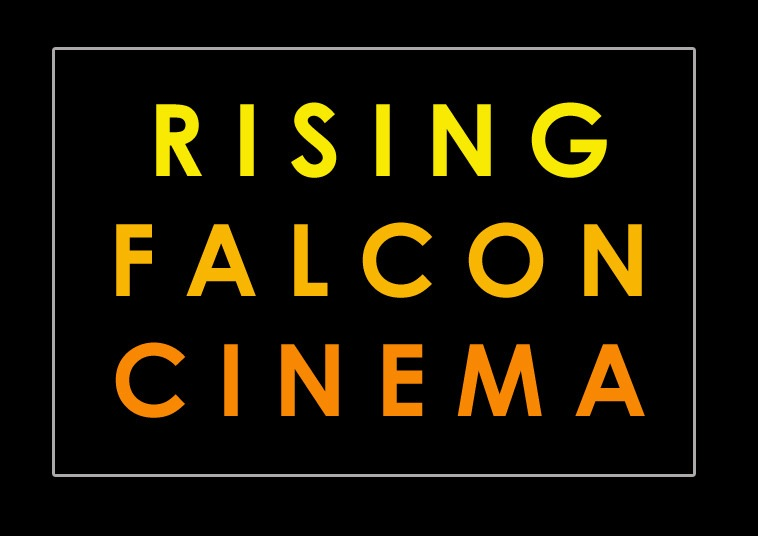
- Founded: 2008
- Headquarters: Las Vegas, Nevada, United States
- Key people: Gregory Cahill

Rising Falcon Cinema is Gregory Cahill's production company. It is one of the production companies involved with Two Shadows and The Golden Voice. Cahill is trying to work on a new project idea, Metalheads, through Rising Falcon Cinema as well.
