= Still the King =

American comedy television series

- Genre: Sitcom
- Created by: Travis Nicholson; Potsy Ponciroli; Billy Ray Cyrus
- Starring: Billy Ray Cyrus; Joey Lauren Adams; Madison Iseman; Travis Nicholson; Lacey Chabert; Leslie David Baker
- Country of origin: United States
- Original language: English
- No. of seasons: 2
- No. of episodes: 26

Production
- Executive producers: Billy Ray Cyrus; Shannon Houchins; Potsy Ponciroli; Travis Nicholson; Julia Silverton; Jayson Dinsmore
- Producer: Hideout Pictures
- Cinematography: Blake McClure; John Matysiak
- Camera setup: Single-camera
- Running time: 22 minutes
- Production companies: Hideout Pictures; Flatwood Productions

Original release
- Network: CMT
- Release: June 12, 2016 – August 22, 2017

Still the King is an American sitcom created by Travis Nicholson, Potsy Ponciroli and Billy Ray Cyrus. The series stars Billy Ray Cyrus, Joey Lauren Adams, Madison Iseman, Travis Nicholson, Lacey Chabert and Leslie David Baker. The series premiered on June 12, 2016, on CMT. On July 27, 2016, CMT renewed Still the King for a 13-episode second season, which premiered on July 11, 2017. On November 17, 2017, the series was cancelled after two seasons.

== Premise ==
Vernon Brownmule, aka "Burnin' Vernon," is the second-best Elvis impersonator around. After crashing into a church sign while driving drunk, he has to serve as the church's handyman as part of his parole. He meets an old girlfriend and learns he has a teenage daughter he has never met.

== Cast ==
- Billy Ray Cyrus as Vernon Brownmule
- Joey Lauren Adams as Debbie Lynn Cooke
- Madison Iseman as Charlotte
- Travis Nicholson as Walt
- Lacey Chabert as Laura Beth
- Leslie David Baker as Curtis
- Kevin Farley as Mitch Doily
- Jon Sewell as Ronnie

== Production ==
In 2013, Hideout Pictures, a subsidiary of music label Average Joes Entertainment produced "Still The King" as self-funded independent pilot. In 2015, the show was picked up by CMT.

== Episodes ==
=== Series overview ===
Season	Episodes	Originally aired	
Season	Episodes	First aired	Last aired
1	13	June 12, 2016	August 14, 2016
2	13	July 11, 2017	August 22, 2017

=== Season 1 (2016) ===
No. overall	No. in season	Title	Directed by	Written by	Original release date	Prod. code	US viewers (millions)
1	1	"Pilot"	Potsy Ponciroli	Billy Ray Cyrus, Potsy Ponciroli & Travis Nicholson	June 12, 2016	101	0.81
2	2	"Preach On"	Jon Poll	Story by : Potsy Ponciroli, Travis Nicholson, Kevin M. Brennan & Doug Manley; Teleplay by : Potsy Ponciroli & Travis Nicholson	June 12, 2016	102	0.73
3	3	"Take Your Daughter to Work Day"	Potsy Ponciroli	Alessia Costantini	June 19, 2016	103	0.50
4	4	"Puddin' Hood"	Jon Poll	Kevin M. Brennan & Doug Manley	June 19, 2016	104	0.44
5	5	"Guess Who's Comin' to Dinner"	Jon Poll	Dina Chapman & Steven Sessions	June 26, 2016	105	0.36
6	6	"A Family, A Fair"	Lev L. Spiro	Dina Chapman & Steven Sessions	July 3, 2016	106	0.37
7	7	"The King Has Left the Building"	Lev L. Spiro	Kevin M. Brennan & Doug Manley	July 10, 2016	107	0.40
8	8	"Mother Trucker"	Tamra Davis	Kylie Condon	July 17, 2016	108	0.39
9	9	"Hands on a Hard Vessel"	Potsy Ponciroli	Travis Nicholson & Potsy Ponciroli	July 24, 2016	109	0.23
10	10	"Back on Top"	Tamra Davis	Alessia Costantini	July 31, 2016	110	0.25
11	11	"Seshfest"	Tamra Davis	Kylie Condon	August 7, 2016	111	0.19
12	12	"Only the Lonely"	Potsy Ponciroli	Story by : Dina Chapman & Steven Sessions; Teleplay by : Alessia Costantini	August 14, 2016	112	0.19
13	13	"The Beginning of the End of the Beginning"	Potsy Ponciroli	Story by : Kevin M. Brennan & Doug Manley; Teleplay by : Potsy Ponciroli & Travis Nicholson	August 14, 2016	113	0.19

=== Season 2 (2017) ===
No. overall	No. in season	Title	Directed by	Written by	Original release date	Prod. code	US viewers (millions)
14	1	"Still Still the King"	Potsy Ponciroli	Travis Nicholson	July 11, 2017	201	0.19
15	2	"Battle of the Basement"	Potsy Ponciroli	Potsy Ponciroli	July 11, 2017	202	0.11
16	3	"Men and Work"	Potsy Ponciroli	Dina Chapman & Steven Sessions	July 18, 2017	203	0.11
17	4	"Flatbushes"	Potsy Ponciroli	Billy Ray Cyrus, Kevin M. Brennan & Doug Manley	July 25, 2017	204	0.16
18	5	"Showcase Showdown"	Potsy Ponciroli	Kevin M. Brennan & Doug Manley	July 25, 2017	205	0.08
19	6	"P.A.L.S. Weekend"	Potsy Ponciroli	Kylie Condon	August 1, 2017	206	0.10
20	7	"The Hungover Games"	Joey Lauren Adams	Dina Chapman & Steven Sessions	August 1, 2017	207	0.07
21	8	"Trayning Day"	Lev L. Spiro	Potsy Ponciroli	August 8, 2017	208	0.06
22	9	"Reign of Tears"	Lev L. Spiro	Story by : Jordan Pomaville; Teleplay by : Kevin M. Brennan & Doug Manley	August 8, 2017	209	0.04
23	10	"Hockey Tonk"	Lev L. Spiro	Travis Nicholson	August 15, 2017	210	0.09
24	11	"Ronnie Brasco"	Joey Lauren Adams	Story by : Eric Williams; Teleplay by : Dina Chapman & Steven Sessions	August 15, 2017	211	0.08
25	12	"Vernon's Single"	Victor Nelli Jr.	Story by : Kylie Condon; Teleplay by : Veronica McCarthy	August 22, 2017	212	0.11
26	13	"Who's Your Daddy?"	Victor Nelli Jr.	Kevin M. Brennan & Doug Manley	August 22, 2017	213	0.08

=== Ratings ===
No.	Title	Original air date	Viewers (million)	Rating (Adults 18–49)	Source
1	"Pilot"	June 12, 2016	0.81	0.3	
2	"Preach On"	June 12, 2016	0.73	0.2	
3	"Take Your Daughter To Work Day"	June 19, 2016	0.45	0.1	
4	"Puddin' Hood"	June 19, 2016	0.44	0.1	
5	"Guess Who's Coming To Diner"	June 26, 2016	0.36	0.1	
6	"A Family, A Fair"	July 3, 2016	0.37	0.1	
7	"The King Has Left The Building"	July 10, 2016	0.40	0.1	
8	"Mother Trucker"	July 17, 2016	0.34	0.1	
9	"Hands on a Hard Vessel"	July 24, 2016	0.23	0.1	
10	"Back On Top"	July 31, 2016	0.25	0.1	
11	"Seshfest"	August 7, 2016	0.19	0.1	
12	"Only the Lonely"	August 14, 2016	0.19	0.1	
13	"The Beginning of the End of the Beginning"	August 14, 2016	0.19	0.1	
14	"Still Still the King"	July 11, 2017	0.14	0.1	
15	"Battle of the Basement"	July 11, 2017	0.11	0.0	
16	"Men and Work"	July 18, 2017	0.11	0.0	
17	"Flatbushes"	July 25, 2017	0.16	0.0	
18	"Showcase Showdown"	July 25, 2017	0.08	0.0	
19	"P.A.L.S. Weekend"	August 1, 2017	0.10	0.0	
20	"The Hungover Games"	August 1, 2017	0.07	0.0	
21	"Trayning Day"	August 8, 2017	0.06	0.0	
22	"Reign of Tears"	August 8, 2017	0.04	0.0	
23	"Hockey Tonk"	August 15, 2017	0.09	0.0	
24	"Ronnie Brasco"	August 15, 2017	0.08	0.0	
25	"Vernon's Single"	August 22, 2017	0.11	0.1	
26	"Who's Your Daddy"	August 22, 2017	0.08	0.0	
