= Two Shadows =

- Official One-Sheet (artwork by Ryan Graber)
- Directed by: Gregory Cahill
- Written by: Greg Cahill
- Produced by: Greg Cahill; Christen Marquez; Arn Chorn-Pond; Dara Yem
- Starring: Sophea Pel; Lida Lang; Polo Doot
- Cinematography: John Matysiak
- Edited by: Greg Cahill
- Music by: Ryan Leach
- Production companies: Rising Falcon Cinema; Paradocs Productions
- Release date: May 13, 2012 (Los Angeles Asian Pacific)
- Running time: 94 minutes
- Countries: United States; Cambodia
- Languages: Khmer; English

Two Shadows is a narrative drama film released in 2012. The film won the Audience Award, Cinematography Award and was nominated for the Grand Jury Award at the 2012 Los Angeles Asian Pacific Film Festival. It is one of the first films to focus on Cambodian immigrants in the United States seeking to sustain family connections in Cambodia since the fall of 1970s communist party, the Khmer Rouge. The film is the second collaboration between director Gregory Cahill and actress Sophea Pel, following the 2006 short film The Golden Voice about Cambodian singer Ros Serey Sothear. The film was shot primarily in Cambodia and also in Los Angeles, California.

== Plot ==
Cambodian-American hipster wannabe Sovanna opens a cryptic letter from Cambodia claiming that her long-lost brother and sister are still alive. She travels to her birthplace alone to seek out her two siblings who disappeared during the civil war 20 years earlier. Upon discovering a girl who may or may not be her real sister, Sovanna is ensnared into an increasingly dangerous situation, torn between concern for her own safety, and her compassion for a stranger.

== Accolades ==
List of awards and nominations
Award / Film festival	Category	Recipients	Result	Ref.
Los Angeles Asian Pacific Film Festival	Audience Award - Narrative Feature	Gregory Cahill	Won	
Los Angeles Asian Pacific Film Festival	Special Jury Prize - Best Cinematography - Narrative Feature	John Matysiak For Model Minority	Won	
Los Angeles Asian Pacific Film Festival	Grand Jury Prize - Best Narrative Feature	Gregory Cahill	Nominated	
