= Ted Thin Elk =

American actor (1919–1997)

- Born: August 14, 1919
- Died: January 27, 1997 (aged 77)
- Occupation: actor
- Years active: 1992–1997

Marvin (Ted) Thin Elk, Sr. (August 14, 1919 – January 27, 1997) was a Sicangu Lakota Sioux actor who spent most of his life on the Rosebud Indian Reservation in South Dakota. Ted became very involved in the Sicangu Lakota community through his participation in the Lakota Treaty Council and membership in the Grey Eagle Society. Because of his involvement in the community, Ted Thin Elk was awarded the title of chief. At the age of 72 Ted was cast in his first role as Grandpa Sam Reaches in the film Thunderheart. For his work in the film, Ted Thin Elk was accorded a First Americans in the Arts Award in 1992, the first year the honor was awarded. Ted continued his acting career by participating in two more films, The Broken Chain and Walking Thunder, and a television mini-series, Heaven and Hell: North and South, Book III, before dying in 1997.

== Personal life ==
In Ted Thin Elk's 77 years of life he had three different spouses. His first marriage was to a woman named Arvella Pawnee in 1946. These two were married for 21 years until Arvella died in 1967; during this time they had 9 children together. After the passing of his first wife, he was remarried to a woman named Mary Sitting Hawk in 1969. Again, these two were married for 16 years until Mary died in 1985. Ted's final marriage was to Anna V. Carroll in 1993. This marriage only lasted a year before it was annulled in 1994. In his early 20s, Ted Thin Elk served in the United States military during World War II. He was a private in the United States Army stationed in Africa and a part of the Northern African Campaign. During his service in Africa, Ted sustained a minor injury and was relieved of service, returning to the United States.

== Filmography ==
Year	Title	Role	Notes
1992	Thunderheart	Grandpa Sam Reaches	
1993	The Broken Chain	Onondaga Sachem	TV movie
1994	Heaven and Hell: North and South, Book III	Running Wolf	Episode: "Summer 1865 - Autumn 1865"
1997	Walking Thunder	Dark Wind	(final film role)
