= The Forbidden Kingdom =

2008 wuxia film

- Theatrical release poster
- Directed by: Rob Minkoff
- Written by: John Fusco
- Produced by: Casey Silver
- Starring: Jackie Chan; Jet Li; Collin Chou; Liu Yifei; Li Bingbing; Michael Angarano
- Cinematography: Peter Pau
- Edited by: Eric Strand
- Music by: David Buckley
- Production companies: Casey Silver Productions; Relativity Media
- Distributed by: Lionsgate; The Weinstein Company (United States); Huaxia Film Distribution (China)
- Release dates: April 18, 2008 (United States); April 24, 2008 (China)
- Running time: 104 minutes
- Countries: United States; China
- Languages: English; Mandarin; Cantonese
- Budget: $55 million
- Box office: $128 million

The Forbidden Kingdom (Chinese: 功夫之王: Gong Fu Zhi Wang (Mandarin) or Gung Fu Ji Wong (Cantonese) and translated King of Kung Fu (English); Working title: The J & J Project) is a 2008 fantasy wuxia film written by John Fusco and directed by Rob Minkoff, starring Jackie Chan, Jet Li, Michael Angarano, Liu Yifei, Collin Chou, and Li Bingbing. Loosely based on the 16th-century Chinese novel Journey to the West, the plot revolves around Jason Tripitikas (Angarano), a modern-day American teenager who is transported back to ancient China after discovering Sun Wukong's Ruyi Jingu Bang. He accompanies Lu Yan (Chan), Silent Monk (Li), and Golden Sparrow (Yifei) on their quest to return the staff to its rightful owner while trying to avoid the minions of the evil Jade Warlord (Chou) and the White-Haired Witch (Bingbing). The action sequences were choreographed by Yuen Woo-ping.

The film is regarded as the first co-production helmed by an American director to make a primarily English-language wuxia genre film set in ancient China for a global audience. Heavily promoted as the first film starring both Chan and Li, it was distributed in the United States through Lionsgate and The Weinstein Company, and through The Huayi Brothers Film & Taihe Investment Company in China. The film received generally positive reviews from critics and grossed $128 million against a budget of $55 million.

== Plot ==
In South Boston, martial arts film fan Jason Tripitikas dreams of a battle between the Monkey King Sun Wukong and celestial soldiers in the clouds. He later visits a pawn shop in Chinatown to buy wuxia DVDs and discovers a golden staff resembling one that he saw in his dream. On his way home, Jason is harassed by some hooligans, whose leader Lupo attempts to use him to help them rob the shop's owner Hop, who is shot by Lupo. Hop tells Jason to deliver the staff to its rightful owner and Jason flees with it. He is cornered on the rooftop before being pulled off the roof by the staff.

When Jason regains consciousness, he finds himself in an ancient Chinese village under attack by soldiers. They attempt to seize his staff, but he is saved by the inebriated traveling scholar Lu Yan, a supposed "immortal", who remains alert and agile even when drunk.

Lu tells him the story of the rivalry between the Monkey King and the Jade Warlord Erlang Shen, who tricked the former into setting aside the magical staff, Ruyi Jingu Bang, and transformed its owner into a stone statue, but the Monkey King cast his staff far away before the transformation. Lu ends the tale with a prophecy about a "Seeker" who will find the staff and free the Monkey King. Just then, they are attacked by the Warlord's men again, but manage to escape with the help of Golden Sparrow, a young woman whose family was murdered by the Warlord.

Meanwhile, the Warlord, upon learning about the staff, sends the White-Haired Witch Ni Chang to help him retrieve it in exchange for the elixir of immortality. Jason, Lu and Sparrow meet the Silent Monk who joins them in their quest to free the Monkey King. As the four travel to Five Elements Mountain, Lu and the Silent Monk teach Jason kung fu along the way.

After crossing the desert, they encounter Ni Chang, who offers to return Jason home in exchange for the staff. When he refuses, a battle ensues and ends after Ni Chang shoots an arrow which mortally wounds Lu. Jason's team escapes and takes refuge in a monastery, where they learn that Lu is not an immortal as he claimed to be, and only the Warlord's elixir can save his life. Jason goes to the Warlord's palace alone to exchange the staff for the elixir.

However, the Warlord promised the elixir to Ni Chang already. As the Warlord can only give the elixir to one of them, Jason must duel Ni Chang for it. Sparrow, the Silent Monk, and the monks from the monastery arrive to join the battle. The Silent Monk fights the Warlord, and Sparrow fights Ni Chang. Jason manages to grab the elixir and tosses it to Lu, who drinks it and recovers. Lu then fights Ni Chang on the balcony then kicks her off it. Ni Chang tries to strangle him with her hair to climb back up to the balcony, but then he cuts her hair, causing her to fall to an unknown fate.

The Silent Monk is mortally wounded by the Warlord and passes the staff to Jason, who uses it to smash the Monkey King's statue. The Monkey King is freed and the perishing Silent Monk is revealed to be one of his clones. Sparrow is killed following her attempt at vengeance on the Warlord, and the latter is eventually stabbed by Jason after being defeated by the Monkey King and falls into a lava pit to his death. The Jade Emperor, having returned from his meditation, praises Jason for fulfilling the prophecy and grants him one wish. Jason wishes to be returned home.

Jason returns to the present, defeats Lupo, and forces the remaining hooligans to flee. Although he is shot, Hop survives and insists that he is immortal, implying that he may actually be Lu Yan himself. After checking in on the old man, Jason meets a young woman who resembles Sparrow. He then continues honing his kung fu skills, while Lu narrates the Monkey King's search for truth.

== Cast ==
- Jackie Chan as Lu Yan / Old Hop (double role).
- Jet Li as Sun Wukong / Silent Monk (double role)
- Michael Angarano as Jason Tripitikas
- Liu Yifei as Golden Sparrow / Chinatown Girl (double role).
- Li Bingbing as Ni Chang the White-Haired Witch
- Morgan Benoit as Lupo the punk leader
- Collin Chou as Erlang Shen the Jade Warlord (the main antagonist).
- Wang Deshun as Jade Emperor

== Production ==
=== Development ===
While the character Sun Wukong came from Wu Cheng'en's famous classical novel Journey to the West, in an interview with Screen Power magazine, actor Collin Chou denied that the plotline would be related to the novel. The details of the plot were devised by screenwriter John Fusco along with actor Jet Li. Li explains,

The screenwriter is a good friend of mine and we have been sparring partners for the past three years. I was among the first to get hold of the story and later we were joined by Jackie and others. The screenwriter and I discussed how to turn the story into a fantasy and dream-like film. He is a superb screenwriter and has been learning Chinese martial arts for more than 10 years. He has roughly put across in the film some of my basic understanding of martial arts and principles of Buddhism.

In a behind the scenes article he wrote for Kung Fu Magazine, screenwriter John Fusco also stated he derived the surname for the Jason Tripitikas character from "the wandering monk, Tripitaka, from Journey to the West".

The Golden Sparrow character was inspired by Cheng Pei-pei's character Golden Swallow from the Shaw Brothers film Come Drink with Me. Before trying to kill the Jade Warlord, Sparrow refers to the 1966 film, telling him to "Come drink with" her.

Lu Yan is a famous Taoist Saint, better known as Lü Dongbin, one of the Eight Immortals referenced in Jackie Chan's Drunken Master films.

The White-Haired Witch Ni Chang is the anti-heroine of the iconic pulp novel Baifa Monü Zhuan by Liang Yusheng. An adaptation titled The Bride With White Hair is one of the DVDs that Jason looks at in the pawn shop.

The Jade Emperor is the ruler of the Heavens in Chinese myth.

=== Filming ===
Filming began in early 1 May 2007 in the area around the Gobi Desert in Mongolia. Before filming began, the entire cast did a costume fitting and a script read through, certain dialogues were altered to suit the different actors' English speaking abilities; this was due to the majority of the cast having English as their second language. Chan described the first day of shooting as "very relaxing" because the shots only required drama and walking, with no action. When the two martial arts veterans (Chan and Li) did film action scenes together for the first time, they both expressed how easy it was to work with one another. Chan explained:

I have not worked with someone whom I'm comfortable with, in terms of movements, rhythm and natural reactions, in the last 10 years. I have done many fight scenes with others but there were usually more than 10 takes, which is a waste of time as the person may forget his moves and unnecessary injuries. When I fought with Jet, our actions were quick. We also didn't have to do the same stunt over 20 times.

Filming finished on August 24, 2007, and the film went into post-production on September 29, 2007.

== Reception ==
=== Box office ===
The Forbidden Kingdom grossed a total of $127,906,624 worldwide — $52,075,270 in the United States and $75,831,354 in other territories. In its opening weekend in the United States and Canada, the film grossed $21,401,121 in 3,151 theaters, ranking No. 1 at the box office opening weekend and averaging $6,792 per theater.

=== Critical response ===
The review aggregator website Rotten Tomatoes reports that 63% of 131 surveyed critics gave the film positive reviews; the average rating is 6/10. The consensus reads: "This hotly-anticipated pairing of martial arts legends Jackie Chan and Jet Li features dazzling fight scenes but is weighed down by too much filler." Metacritic reports the film has an average score of 57 out of 100 based on 26 reviews, indicating mixed or average reviews. Audiences polled by CinemaScore gave the film an average grade of "A−" on an A+ to F scale.

Perry Lam wrote in Muse magazine, "As a Hollywood blockbuster, The Forbidden Kingdom offers no apologies for its American-Centrism. In fact, it wears it with pride like a badge of honor".

The film was nominated for Best International Film at the Saturn Awards but lost to Let the Right One In.

== Home media ==
The Forbidden Kingdom was released on DVD and Blu-ray 9 September 2008. It sold about 1,199,593 units which translated to revenue of $22,921,609, bringing its worldwide total to $151,758,670.

It is sold on single disc and two-disc special editions. The single disc edition has no extras but contains widescreen and full screen presentations of the film. The special edition includes a commentary by director Rob Minkoff, deleted scenes with commentary, featurettes (The Kung Fu Dream Team, Dangerous Beauty, Discovering China, Filming in Chinawood, and Monkey King and the Eight Immortals), a "Previsualization Featurette" with commentary by writer Fusco and director Minkoff, and a blooper reel. In addition to these extras, the Blu-ray release contains a digital copy.

== See also ==
- Jackie Chan filmography
- Jet Li filmography
- List of American films of 2008
- List of martial arts films
- Jianghu
