= Gregory Cahill =

American director, producer, and screenwriter (born 1982)

- Born: January 21, 1982 (age 44); Boston, Massachusetts, U.S.
- Education: Boston College High School; New York University Tisch School of the Arts
- Occupation: Filmmaker
- Years active: 2004-present

Gregory Cahill (born January 21, 1982) is an American director, producer, and screenwriter known for The Golden Voice and Two Shadows. He is also the production coordinator for The Talk and assistant directed Hell and Back. He won the Audience Award at the Los Angeles Asian Pacific Film Festival for his film Two Shadows and is currently working on his upcoming film Metalheads. Cahill has his own production company, Rising Falcon Cinema, as well.

== Early life ==
Cahill grew up in Boston, Massachusetts. He is a graduate of the Tisch School of the Arts.

== Career ==
In an interview for Cahill's film Two Shadows, he discussed how The Golden Voice led him to the film. "I was really taken with that music and got really interested in one the singers, this female Cambodian rock singer named Ros Sereysothea. I read that she was murdered by the Khmer Rouge. And that all the musicians from that time were murdered by the Khmer Rouge. So that’s when I thought [that] there must have been quite a story behind that. So I researched that and made a short film about that singer…called The Golden Voice. Then in doing research to develop that into a feature, I went to Cambodia a few times, really fell in love with the country, and started hearing peoples’ stories there. That's what led to Two Shadows, which is based on a friend of mine's real-life story."

== Filmography ==
Year	Film	Director	Producer	Writer	Other	Notes
2004	Wolves of Chechnya	Yes	Yes	Yes	No	
2004	Off Islanders	No	No	No	Yes	Assistant director
2005, 2007–11	Medium	No	No	No	Yes	Actor - Episode: Light Sleeper (2005); Miscellaneous Crew (2007–11)
2006	The Golden Voice	Yes	Yes	Yes	No	
2007	Dead Tired	No	No	No	Yes	Assistant director, Music
2012	Mad Men	No	No	No	Yes	Miscellaneous Crew
2012	Two Shadows	Yes	Yes	Yes	Yes	Editor
2014	24: Solitary	No	No	No	Yes	Miscellaneous Crew
2015	Hell and Back	No	No	No	Yes	Assistant director
2015	Any Day	No	No	No	Yes	Miscellaneous Crew
TBA	Metalheads	Yes	Yes	Yes	No	

== Awards and nominations ==
Year	Award	Category	Title	Result
2012	Los Angeles Asian Pacific Film Festival	Audience Award - Narrative Feature	Two Shadows	Won
2012	Los Angeles Asian Pacific Film Festival	Grand Jury Prize - Best Narrative Feature	Two Shadows	Nominated
