= Walking Thunder =

1997 film

Walking Thunder is a 1994 film starring James Read, John Denver and David Tom and Bart the Bear, written and directed by Craig Clyde. It relates the memoirs of a young boy Jacob McKay who travels with his family on a wagon on their way to California and become stranded in the Rockies. There they learn to survive, adapt to their surroundings and make the most of what they have with the help of a mountain man, an elderly Sioux medicine man and a legendary bear known by the Native Americans as Walking Thunder. The film won a Silver Award at the Worldfest Film Festival. It was released in 1995, but was not widely distributed until 1997.

== Plot ==
Jacob McKay, a young boy, travels with his parents (John and Emma) and younger brother Toby in a covered wagon en route to California. They become separated from the wagon train and end up stranded in the Rocky Mountains. While they are sleeping, a bear rummages through the wagon, scares off their mules and livestock, and scatters their possessions. John decides to build a shelter because the wagon's axle is broken and cannot be fixed before winter. Jacob and Toby are sent to look for food and eventually reach a lodge owned by Dark Wind, an old Sioux medicine man. Mountain man Abner Murdock, who understands the Sioux language, interprets between Dark Wind and the kids. Murdock and Dark Wind later share a meal with the McKays, and Dark Wind tells the story of Walking Thunder, a bear with whom he shares a kindred spirit and who reigned over the land where they live.

To survive the winter, Jacob goes with Murdock to a mountain men rendezvous days away to get supplies. Meanwhile, Jacob's family, aided by Dark Wind, work to build a cabin. Eventually, Walking Thunder appears. Dark Wind utters a chant that seems to appease the bear, and it leaves.

At the rendezvous, Jacob buys necessities, and Murdock convinces him to buy a rifle too. Hunter Ansel Richter and his companions, Weasel and Blood Coat, see Jacob spend his money. Thinking he may be wealthy, they decide to trail Jacob and Murdock as they return to the cabin and steal from them. The trio reaches the cabin first and inspects it to find the (non-existent) gold. When they start drinking and becoming unruly, John asks them to leave. Murdock and Jacob arrive later.

The next day, John goes out to hunt and gets shot at by Richter and his cohorts. Murdock saves him, helps the McKays build their cabin, and leaves for Fort Bridger for the winter. Dark Wind blesses the family and gives them tokens of grace. Later, Walking Thunder appears to Richter, who tries to shoot him, but a nearby Dark Wind first utters a warning call, and the bear disappears. Frustrated, Richter shoots Dark Wind in the shoulder. Dark Wind returns to the cabin, where Emma tends to his wound. The trio eventually enters the cabin and threatens to kill the McKays unless they surrender their gold. Murdock arrives and says that there is no gold, driving them away. He changes his mind about going to the fort, feeling he had to stay at the cabin.

Murdock takes John on a hunting trip to obtain meat for the winter. Jacob is left in charge of the cabin. Emma then goes into labor, and Dark Wind, having recovered from his injury, helps deliver the baby girl. Meanwhile, Richter, Weasel, and Blood Coat try to hunt down Walking Thunder for his pelt. Weasel wounds the bear. Murdock and Jacob hear the shot and ride up to avert further killing. In the ensuing fight, Weasel and Blood Coat try to take Murdock down. Richter attempts to kill Dark Wind, who is praying in the woods, but Jacob materializes behind him and tells him to put down his gun. Richter takes Jacob's rifle away and pulls out a knife. Walking Thunder then arrives and wounds Richter, scaring him off. John arrives and helps Murdock fight off Weasel and Blood Coat, who also flee.

Years later, Jacob's grandson Danny McKay reads Jacob's journal. Danny's grandmother then gives him a brand-new journal to record his life events. Meanwhile, Walking Thunder becomes legend. The white man's version says that he died the day that he was shot. According to the Sioux, Dark Wind healed him and roamed with him in the mountains until the spirits recalled them to their eternal afterlife.

== Cast ==
- James Read as Abner Murdock
- John Denver as John McKay
- David Tom as Jacob McKay
- Brian Keith as The Narrator\ Old Jacob McKay
- Irene Miracle as Emma McKay (as Klara Irene Miracle)
- Christopher Neame as Ansel Richter
- Ted Thin Elk as Dark Wind (as Chief Ted Thin Elk)
- Kevin Conners as Toby McKay
- Billy Oscar as Weasel
- Don Shanks as Blood Coat
- Robert DoQui as Gun Trader
- K. C. Clyde as Danny McKay (as Kasey Clyde)
- David Kirk Chambers as Thomas McKay
- Carolyn Hurlburt as Anne McKay
- Bart the Bear as Walking Thunder
