= Motor City (film) =

2026 film by Potsy Ponciroli

- Theatrical release poster
- Directed by: Potsy Ponciroli
- Written by: Chad St. John
- Produced by: Greg Silverman; Jon Berg; Cliff Roberts; Chad St. John; Alan Ritchson; Joshua Harris
- Starring: Alan Ritchson; Ben Foster; Pablo Schreiber; Lionel Boyce; Shailene Woodley
- Cinematography: John Matysiak
- Edited by: Joe Galdo
- Music by: Steve Jablonsky
- Production company: Stampede Ventures
- Distributed by: Independent Film Company
- Release dates: August 30, 2025 (Venice); July 24, 2026 (United States)
- Running time: 103 minutes
- Country: United States
- Language: English
- Budget: $30 million
- Box office: $3 million

Motor City is a 2025 American action thriller film written by Chad St. John and directed by Potsy Ponciroli. Starring Alan Ritchson, Ben Foster, Pablo Schreiber, Lionel Boyce and Shailene Woodley, it follows John Miller (Ritchson), an ex-con, on a quest for revenge against a gangster (Foster) who framed him for a crime he did not commit and stole his girlfriend (Woodley) in 1977 Detroit. The film has minimal dialogue, using a rock soundtrack and action scenes to carry the plot.

The film had its world premiere in the Venice Spotlight section of the 82nd Venice International Film Festival on August 30, 2025, and was released in the United States on July 24, 2026. The film received generally positive reviews from critics.

== Plot ==
In 1976 Detroit, Vietnam War veteran and factory worker John Miller completes probation. He buys an engagement ring for his girlfriend Sophia, having rescued her from drug-trafficking mobster Reynolds, her abusive ex-boyfriend. The jealous Reynolds pays off corrupt police detective Savick to plant drugs in John's car, and just as Sophia agrees to marry John, he is arrested. Savick's fellow detective Kent grows suspicious, but John is sentenced to 25 years in prison, and a heartbroken Sophia reunites with Reynolds.

John is tormented behind bars by Reynolds, who marries Sophia and lives an extravagant lifestyle with her. Deducing that John was framed, Kent confronts Savick and informs Sophia. He is soon killed by Savick, while Sofia confronts Reynolds for what he did to John but Reynolds refuses to let Sophia leave him. John's former squad mates Youngblood and Singh prepare to break him out, torturing guards to provide a prison map, which they hide in a coded letter to John. Molding a shiv out of hard candy, John stabs a guard and steals his uniform as Youngblood and Singh arrive to free him, killing several guards in a fiery escape.

At Reynolds's house, John and his comrades rescue a drugged Sophia. Reynolds attempts to shoot John, but Sophia takes the fatal bullet instead. John is forced to abandon Sophia's body, escaping with her engagement ring as the police arrive and a shootout erupts. A vengeful John and his friends arm themselves with homemade munitions, building explosives and improvised shotgun shells loaded with coins. John prepares a cartridge meant for Reynolds, containing Sophia's ring.

The three brothers-in-arms storm Reynolds's warehouse and massacre his men. Youngblood is gunned down, while Singh is fatally shot by Savick, who attacks John in the elevator with Singh's knife. John narrowly survives a brutal fight by shooting off Savick’s leg. Carrying Savick’s corpse to the roof, he drops it onto a car driven by Reynolds's henchmen, stopping Reynolds from fleeing. On the street, John wounds Reynolds in the face with his improvised shotgun shell, containing Sophia’s engagement ring. He leaps onto the car as the mobster drives away, and they fight until the car crashes, but Reynolds escapes.

Decades later, the elderly, wealthy Reynolds lives in an isolated mansion. He receives a threatening scrapbook of old newspaper articles from John, who has finally tracked him down. Infiltrating the mansion, John holds him at gunpoint, as Reynolds declares that he loved Sophia. John replies that he still does, shooting Reynolds dead and taking his revenge.

== Cast ==
- Alan Ritchson as John Miller
- Shailene Woodley as Sophia Hammond
- Ben Foster as Reynolds
- Pablo Schreiber as Savick
- Ben McKenzie as Kent
- Lionel Boyce as Youngblood
- Amar Chadha-Patel as Singh
- Rafael Cebrián as Athos

== Production ==
Chad St. John's script was included in the 2009 Black List; in 2011, the film was at its early development stages as a potential Warner Bros. project, with Albert Hughes attached as director and Chris Evans being offered the lead role by the studio. Hughes' brother Allen had planned to direct the similarly-titled crime-thriller film, Broken City, around the same time.

By September 2011, Dominic Cooper entered negotiations to star in Motor City after Joel Silver, who was producing the film through his company Dark Castle Entertainment for Warner Bros., was impressed with Cooper's dual role performance in The Devil's Double. In March 2012, it was reported that Cooper had left the project due to scheduling conflicts and Jake Gyllenhaal was in talks to replace Cooper and star alongside Amber Heard and Gary Oldman. Later that same month, Gyllenhaal experienced similar scheduling conflicts which resulted in the producers entering into negotiations with Gerard Butler to play the lead. By August of that year, it was reported that Adrien Brody had joined the film to play the villain after Oldman dropped out.

Production had been planned for a September 2012 start in Atlanta with Emmett/Furla Oasis and Mark Damon's Foresight Unlimited providing financing, but by that month a spokesperson for Foresight stated shooting would be delayed as they didn't believe they could meet the March 31, 2013 delivery date without compromising the quality of the film. While Warner Bros. did voice the intention of continuing on with Motor City, the company's decision to end their relationship with producer Joel Silver likely played a factor in the project's collapse. This was evidenced by Warner Bros. decision to scale back distribution and promotion of Silver's The Apparition during that time.

In May 2023, it was announced that Alan Ritchson was cast in the film, with Timur Bekmambetov then announced as the director. In May 2024, it was announced that directorial duties were shifted from Bekmambetov to Potsy Ponciroli and that Shailene Woodley, Ben Foster and Pablo Schreiber were added to the cast. It was also reported in May 2024 that filming would begin on July 10 and would occur in New Jersey and partially in Detroit.

NJ.com reported in August 2024 that filming was then occurring in New Jersey. Foster revealed in September that same year that the film reportedly contains only "five lines of dialogue."

== Release ==
The film premiered at the 82nd Venice International Film Festival, in the Venice Spotlight sidebar. In October 2025, Independent Film Company acquired U.S. distribution rights to the film for $3–4 million. It was released in the United States on July 24, 2026.

== Reception ==
On Rotten Tomatoes, 63% of 97 critic reviews are positive, with an average rating of 6.1 out of 10. The website’s consensus reads: "Motor City's deliberate lack of dialogue occasionally backfires in a story that winds up running on fumes, but a rollicking soundtrack and visual panache soup up the engine enough to deliver a memorable ride." According to Metacritic, the film received "generally favorable reviews" based on a weighted average score of 63 out of 100 from 18 critic scores.

== Legal issues ==
In 2013, after the Warner Bros. incarnation of Motor City was cancelled, Gerard Butler sued Randall Emmett and George Furla who were financing the film through Emmett/Furla Oasis for $5.1 million in damages. Butler alleged breach of contract and breach of implied covenant of good faith and fair dealing. He claimed he had a pay-or-play deal with the producers guaranteeing $4 million even if the film was never made as well as up to $2 million in compensation. Butler claimed that he turned down other offers due to his commitment to the film and also needed to negotiate with the producers of Olympus Has Fallen to ensure the shooting schedule would not be affected. An attorney for Emmett/Furla Oasis countered that they had no legal obligation to pay Butler as there was no written agreement.
