= Old Henry =

2021 American film by Potsy Ponciroli

- Theatrical release poster
- Directed by: Potsy Ponciroli
- Written by: Potsy Ponciroli
- Produced by: Shannon Houchins; Mike Hagerty
- Starring: Tim Blake Nelson; Scott Haze; Gavin Lewis; Trace Adkins; Stephen Dorff
- Cinematography: John Matysiak
- Edited by: Jamie Kirkpatrick
- Music by: Jordan Lehning
- Production company: Hideout Pictures
- Distributed by: Shout! Studios
- Release dates: September 7, 2021 (Venice); October 1, 2021 (United States)
- Running time: 99 minutes
- Country: United States
- Language: English
- Budget: $1.5 million
- Box office: $42,068

Old Henry is a 2021 American western action drama film written and directed by Potsy Ponciroli. It stars Tim Blake Nelson as the titular character, a farmer who must protect his son from outlaws, with Scott Haze, Gavin Lewis, Trace Adkins, and Stephen Dorff in supporting roles. The film had its world premiere at the Venice Film Festival on September 7, 2021, and was theatrically released in the United States by Shout! Studios on October 1. It was critically acclaimed for the story, Ponciroli's direction, and Nelson's performance. The National Board of Review selected the film in its annual list of the Top Ten Independent Films of the year.

== Plot ==
In 1906, widower Henry McCarty and his son Wyatt reside on a farm in the Oklahoma Territory, near that of Henry's brother-in-law, Al. After a lost horse appears on their farm with a bloodstained saddle, Henry locates its owner, a man named Curry, who is near death. A pistol and a satchel filled with money are found beside Curry. Initially disinclined to intervene, Henry departs on horseback, intending to leave the wounded man there. However, he reconsiders, returning to the farm with the unconscious Curry and the satchel. Henry subsequently questions Curry, who identifies himself as a sheriff and the only survivor of a posse dispatched to apprehend a group of outlaws. Curry requests assistance in preventing the outlaws from recovering the stolen money.

After Henry leaves to get the doctor, Wyatt surreptitiously takes Curry's firearm to practice his marksmanship. Curry breaks free and attempts to retrieve the weapon, but Henry intervenes, subduing him. Henry discloses that he reversed course after observing three individuals examining the location where he discovered Curry. The group, led by Sam Ketchum and displaying lawmen's badges, arrive at the farm seeking Curry. They allege that Curry is the true outlaw, but their inquiries into Henry's identity and family raise his concerns.

Following a tense standoff, the men depart, and Henry keeps Curry tied up. Later that evening, Curry shares intimate knowledge of individuals known to Henry, prompting Henry to untie one of his hands. Curry tells him that, as a young ranch hand, he witnessed the death of Billy the Kid. Dugan, one of Ketchum's men, then attempts to ambush Henry, but Henry discovers him, forcing him out with a shotgun and subsequently strangling him in front of Wyatt.

The following morning, Ketchum and his gang return. Curry urges Henry to surrender, arguing that he and Wyatt should not sacrifice themselves for him. However, Ketchum reveals he has taken Al hostage and, when Henry refuses to surrender, shoots Al. After preventing his son from running outside, Henry arms himself, instructing Wyatt to "Keep your damn head down, you'll be alright." Curry recognizes this phrase as an instruction Billy the Kid gave him when he was a boy, realizing that Henry is indeed Billy the Kid and that he and Pat Garrett faked his death.

Henry pretends to surrender before shooting Ketchum, gunning down several men, re-entering the farmhouse and then slipping out the back door. While Curry and Wyatt hold off the remaining gang members, Henry stealthily eliminates the gang until only Stilwell, the gang's tracker, is left. Stilwell tosses his guns and tries to throw a knife, but Henry shoots it out of his hand and then shoots him through his eye.

The situation escalates as Ketchum reappears, revealing that Henry's shot only inflicted a facial wound. A tense exchange of gunfire ensues, ending when Ketchum runs out of bullets; Henry kills him. Upon returning to the house, Henry prepares to treat the wounded Curry, only to discover a criminal brand on his arm. Curry shoots Henry in the abdomen, after which he confesses his true identity as a sheriff who joined Ketchum's gang with his deputies but then tried to get away on realizing that Ketchum intended to kill them. Curry expresses remorse, because Henry had been good to him when he was a boy, but then adds that he will now be the man who killed Billy the Kid.

Wyatt arrives and kills Curry before he can shoot Henry again. Before dying, Henry speaks of his own regrets, but expresses pride in his son along with his hope that Wyatt will find his place in the world. Wyatt buries his father alongside his mother and then leaves the farm, presumably taking the gang's money with him.

== Cast ==
- Tim Blake Nelson as Henry
- Scott Haze as Curry
- Gavin Lewis as Wyatt
- Trace Adkins as Al
- Stephen Dorff as Ketchum
- Richard Speight Jr. as Dugan
- Max Arciniega as Stilwell
- Brad Carter as Branigan

== Production ==
In an interview, Tim Blake Nelson said starring in the 2018 Western film The Ballad of Buster Scruggs taught him how to handle a gun, "I was working with guns every day for about five months to be able to do the pistol tricks." On December 15, 2020, Hideout Pictures and Shout! Studios announced a partnership to produce, finance, and distribute three Westerns, including Old Henry from writer and director Potsy Ponciroli. According to Nelson, he was heating up his food when he came across an email that offered him the title role. He told GQ that his initial response was to say, "Well, it happened. You've been offered a character that's described as old."

During pre-production, Nelson spent six months researching how his character would sound and move. He then spent another six months working on the 100-page screenplay with Ponciroli and two months physically preparing his body to handle a gun, ride a horse, and get in shape to look like a farmer. Nelson's role in the film was confirmed on January 12, 2021. On his performance, he says he "wanted for Henry by the end of the movie to be vastly different from the character he was at the beginning of the movie, and for the audience to never be able to name a single moment where the transformation happens."

Nelson feared the public would negatively compare his role as Henry to his performance as Buster Scruggs, characters he finds to be "opposites". He spoke with Ponciroli about the issue and the pair agreed the film would not feature gunspinning; the final product features one spin during the film's finale that serves as a "punctuation". On January 14, 2021, Stephen Dorff, Trace Adkins, Scott Haze, and Gavin Lewis joined the cast. Principal photography for Old Henry took place in Tennessee between January and March 2021.

== Release ==
Old Henry had its world premiere out of competition at the Venice Film Festival on September 7, 2021. It was released in around 30 theaters in the United States on October 1, 2021. In New York, Steve Buscemi hosted a Q&A session with Nelson at the Quad Cinema on its opening day. On October 8, the film was released through video on demand. It became a sleeper hit on VOD, staying in the top ten on iTunes for two consecutive months following initial release.

== Reception ==
=== Critical response ===
In the United States and Canada, Old Henry grossed $42,068 at the box office. On the review aggregator website Rotten Tomatoes, 94% of 72 critics' reviews are positive, with an average rating of 7.6/10. The website's consensus reads: "Led by a reliably solid performance from Tim Blake Nelson, Old Henry serves up a supple cut of vintage western rawhide." Metacritic, which uses a weighted average, assigned the film a score of 69 out of 100, based on 18 critics, indicating "generally favorable" reviews.

The film's plot and execution received generally positive reviews. From TheWrap, Steve Pond said he wished parts of the film were "more expansive" but overall described it as a "beautiful elegy" with a finale that feels "just right." Writing for The Hollywood Reporter, David Rooney described the direction of the film as a "well-crafted exercise in old-fashioned but durable genre tropes" that later "evolves into a satisfying reflection on the more complicated, somber realities behind the icons of the Wild West." In a negative review, The Guardian's Xan Brooks found it to be too familiar to other Westerns and expressed doubt that the film should have been screened at the Venice Film Festival.

Tim Blake Nelson's performance as the title character received praise. Rooney said Nelson was able to "communicate with pathos both the regret and the steely resolve behind every beady-eyed squint." Variety's Owen Gleiberman wrote that the film was "built as a kind of pedestal for Nelson's performance."

=== Accolades ===
Old Henry was chosen as the best feature film of the 2021 Almería Western Film Festival. At the end of the year, the National Board of Review selected it in its annual list of the Top Ten Independent Films.
