= John Fusco =

American screenwriter, writer, martial artist

- Born: United States
- Occupations: Screenwriter, producer, television writer, author
- Writing career
- Language: English
- Genres: Film, television, fiction

John Fusco is an American screenwriter, producer, and television series creator born in Prospect, Connecticut. His screenplays include Crossroads, Young Guns, Young Guns II, Thunderheart, Hidalgo, Spirit: Stallion of the Cimarron and The Highwaymen. He is also the creator of the Netflix series Marco Polo. Fusco is also a blues musician and a prose fiction author.

== Career ==
John Fusco was raised in the small town of Prospect, Connecticut, leaving home and high school early to travel the American South as a blues musician and blue collar laborer. He later attended and graduated from NYU's Tisch School of the Arts where his writing mentors were Waldo Salt, Ring Lardner, Jr., and Lorenzo Semple. He won back-to-back honors in national screenwriting competitions his junior and senior year, twice winning the top prize of a Nissan Sentra and a contract with the William Morris Agency. His bachelor's thesis became the Columbia Pictures Delta blues movie Crossroads (1986), directed by Walter Hill, and went into production while he was still a student at NYU.

Fusco has gone on to write numerous motion-pictures, an ABC mini-series, a long-form TV series, and two novels. He created the Netflix original series Marco Polo, which ran for two seasons from 2014 to 2016. Fusco also wrote the screenplay for the Lionsgate film The Shack which premiered on March 3, 2017. The film over-performed, grossing nearly $100 million worldwide against a $20 million budget.

In 2026, Fusco’s original spec script modern western entitled The Rescue became the first movie to get the greenlight at the new Paramount and was directed by Potsy Ponciroli and star Brandon Sklenar. The movie will be released in January 2027.

In November 2025, it was reported that Fusco was developing a motorsports drama entitled Thunder Road with AMC in association with NASCAR, which would follow a family's multi-generational dynasty in stock car racing. In April 2026, it was reported that Dennis Quaid had been cast in a starring role.

== Music ==
After traveling in the southeast United States in search of obscure blues artists in the late 1970s, Fusco returned home to New England to co-found the Travis McComb Band, a southern rock ensemble that was popular in the New Haven, Connecticut music scene. Fusco played Hammond B3 organ, blues harmonica, was the lead vocalist, and wrote or co-wrote the band's originals. For a short time in 1979, he joined and toured with the Dixie Road Ducks from Northern Virginia, but soon left both bands to return to school and his pursuit of a screenwriting career.

His first movie, Crossroads, was inspired by his love for the Delta blues and his travels in the south. The movie would have him collaborating with Ry Cooder, Steve Vai, Frank Frost, and blues harp legend Sonny Terry. He also collaborated with Jackson Browne on the music video "Rockin' the Rez" which was a companion to Fusco's 1992 movie Thunderheart.

Fusco returned to music and released his debut LP The X-Road Riders on February 11, 2019. Recorded near Memphis with members of the North Mississippi All-Stars, the album has been critically acclaimed. Blues Rock Review has called the collection of original songs "an incredibly impressive and fun debut," while other music critics have praised Fusco's "smoky, soulful voice" and Hammond B3 organ skills. Fusco also plays Hammond B3 on Hill Country Revue's third LP 'HCR III' which was released on July 6, 2018, landing at #2 on the iTunes blues chart.

Fusco is known to perform as returning special guest with the Allman-Betts Family Revival and North Mississippi Allstars. He has performed on stage with Anders Osborne, G. Love, Larry McCray, Greg Koch, Tal Wilkenfeld, Jimmy Hall, Sierra Hull, Amanda Shires, and Joey Williams of the Blind Boys of Alabama.

== Martial arts ==
While known for Western and Native American themed films, Fusco drew on his lifelong background in martial arts to write The Forbidden Kingdom, starring Jet Li and Jackie Chan. The movie opened #1 at the box office on April 18, 2008, and broke opening day box office records (at that time) in China.

Fusco start studying martial arts at age 12 at the Association Of Korean Martial Arts (A.K.M.A) in Oakville, Connecticut under Romaine Staples and currently holds a black sash rank in Northern Shaolin Kung Fu. He is also a practitioner of Wing Chun, Jeet Kune Do, and has received an honorary black belt from the World Tang Soo Do Association for his work in promoting traditional martial arts values in film, television, and literature. He has been profiled in Black Belt Magazine, Inside Kung Fu, and Kung Fu/Tai Chi Magazine.

Fusco has also studied traditional martial arts in Zhejiang Province, China under Sifu Yi ShenGuo.

Fusco has stated in DVD special features that he is interested in the spiritual aspects of warrior cultures and acknowledges a "red thread" that runs through his interests in both Native American and Eastern philosophy. In 2007 he crossed Central Mongolia on horseback with his son and Mongol nomads to conduct research on what would eventually develop into Marco Polo.

== Personal life ==
Fusco is married to Richela Renkun, a graduate of NYU's Steinhardt School and an educator in the theater arts. They have one son, Giovanni. The family lives on a farm in Vermont.

== Awards ==
- 1983 — FOCUS Award, First place: Blues Water
- 1984 — FOCUS Award, First Place: Crossroads
- 1989 — WRANGLER Award—Western Heritage Center: Young Guns
- 2003 — WRANGLER Award—Western Heritage Center: Spirit
- 2004 — THE HUMANITARIAN AWARD—First Americans in the Arts: Dreamkeeper mini-series
- 2005 — Spur Award—Western Writers of America: Hidalgo
- 2020 -- Spur Award 'The Highwaymen'

== Filmography ==
=== Film ===
Year	Title	Writer	Producer	Notes
1986	Crossroads	Yes	No	
1988	Young Guns	Yes	Executive	
1990	Young Guns II	Yes	Executive	Also actor Role: Branded Man
1992	Thunderheart	Yes	Yes	
1992	The Babe	Yes	Yes	
1993	Where the Rivers Flow North	No	Associate	
1996	Loch Ness	Yes	No	
2002	Spirit: Stallion of the Cimarron	Yes	No	
2003	Dreamkeeper	Yes	Associate	
2004	Hidalgo	Yes	No	
2006	Silent Thunder	No	Associate	
2008	The Forbidden Kingdom	Yes	No	
2016	Crouching Tiger, Hidden Dragon: Sword of Destiny	Yes	No	
2017	The Shack	Yes	No	
2019	The Highwaymen	Yes	No	
2022	The Wind & The Reckoning	Yes	Yes	
2027	The Rescue	Yes	Executive	

=== Television ===
Year	Title	Writer	Creator	Executive producer	Notes
2004	America's First Horse: Hidalgo and the Spanish Mustang	No	No	Yes	Television short
2014–2016	Marco Polo	Yes	Yes	Yes	

== Prose fiction ==
Fusco is an author of two novels and an award-winning children's book:

- Paradise Salvage (Overlook Press, 2002), mystery and literary novel, LCCN 2001-51356
- Dog Beach: a novel (Simon & Schuster, 2014) – featuring a "struggling screenwriter" and a "stuntman turned mafia enforcer", LCCN 2013-49875
- Little Monk and the Mantis: a bug, a boy, and the birth of a kung fu legend, illus. Patrick Lugo (Tuttle Publ., 2012), young readers book – "based on the seventeenth-century legend of Wong Long and the founding of praying mantis kung fu", LCCN 2011-43962
