= The Rescue (2027 film) =

Upcoming American Western film

- Teaser poster
- Directed by: Potsy Ponciroli
- Written by: John Fusco
- Produced by: Shannon Houchins; Cliff Roberts; Potsy Ponciroli
- Starring: Brandon Sklenar; Josh Lucas; Hassie Harrison; Lorelei Olivia Mote; Nick Searcy; Austin Amelio; Spencer Treat Clark; Tim Blake Nelson; Josh Duhamel
- Cinematography: John Matysiak
- Edited by: Roger Barton; Joe Galdo
- Music by: Steve Jablonsky
- Production companies: Spyglass Media Group; Hideout Productions
- Distributed by: Paramount Pictures
- Release date: January 29, 2027
- Country: United States
- Language: English

The Rescue is an upcoming American contemporary Western action thriller film directed by Potsy Ponciroli and written by John Fusco. The film stars Brandon Sklenar, Josh Lucas, Hassie Harrison, Lorelei Olivia Mote, Nick Searcy, Austin Amelio, Spencer Treat Clark, Tim Blake Nelson, and Josh Duhamel.

The Rescue is scheduled to be released in the United States by Paramount Pictures on January 29, 2027.

== Premise ==
A former rodeo cowboy takes matters into his own hands when his daughter is kidnapped and held for ransom. With her devoted dog by his side, he sets out to bring her home and will stop at nothing to find her while uncovering a criminal conspiracy along the way.

== Cast ==
- Brandon Sklenar as Jamie Lee
- Josh Lucas
- Hassie Harrison as Kaley Tucker
- Lorelei Olivia Mote
- Nick Searcy
- Austin Amelio
- Spencer Treat Clark
- Tim Blake Nelson
- Josh Duhamel
- Sterlin English as Tyler

== Production ==
In January 2025, it was announced that Potsy Ponciroli would produce and direct The Rescue, from a screenplay by John Fusco with Brandon Sklenar set to star. Paramount Pictures would distribute. In December 2025, Hassie Harrison joined the cast. The rest of the cast was announced in March 2026.

Principal photography took place in Georgia from February 9, 2026, to March 26, 2026. Steve Jablonsky composed the film’s score.

Ponciroli, Cliff Roberts and Shannon Houchins produced the film. Eric Hedayat, John Fusco, Tim McGraw, Tim Staples, Brian Kaplan, Joel Bergvall, Gary Barber, Pete Chiappetta, Anthony Tittanegro and Andrew Lary served as executive producers.

== Release ==
The film is scheduled to be released on January 29, 2027.
