= Eye of God (film) =

1997 American crime film

- Film poster
- Directed by: Tim Blake Nelson
- Written by: Tim Blake Nelson
- Based on: Eye of God by Tim Blake Nelson
- Produced by: Wendy Ettinger; Michael Nelson
- Starring: Martha Plimpton; Kevin Anderson; Hal Holbrook; Nick Stahl; Richard Jenkins; Margo Martindale; Mary Kay Place
- Cinematography: Russell Lee Fine
- Edited by: Kate Sanford
- Production company: Minnow Pictures
- Distributed by: Castle Hill Productions
- Release dates: January 1997 (Sundance); October 17, 1997 (United States)
- Running time: 84 minutes
- Country: United States
- Language: English

Eye of God is a 1997 American crime drama film written and directed by Tim Blake Nelson, based on his stage play of the same name. It stars Martha Plimpton, Kevin Anderson, Nick Stahl, and Hal Holbrook. The film follows two plot lines which are revealed to be connected in a nonlinear narrative.

Nelson developed the script at the Sundance Institute's Screenwriters and Directors Labs. The film won the American Independent Award at the Seattle International Film Festival in 1997 and the Bronze Award at the 1997 Tokyo International Film Festival. Nelson was nominated for the Someone to Watch Award at the 1998 Independent Spirit Awards and the Grand Jury Prize at the 1997 Sundance Film Festival. The movie was filmed in the areas of Skiatook, Perry, and Tulsa of Oklahoma in early 1996.

== Plot ==
In the small town of Kingfisher, Oklahoma, the local sheriff stumbles upon the traumatized teenager Tommy covered in someone else's blood. After the sheriff prods the boy, he learns that a young woman has been raped and murdered.

In a parallel story, Ainsley, a waitress at a diner, takes in and marries ex-convict Jack. Jack, whom Ainsley has been in correspondence with during his incarceration, has converted to born-again Christianity. A series of events explains how Ainsley and Jack's story intersects with Tommy's.

== Cast ==
- Martha Plimpton as Ainsley DuPree
- Kevin Anderson as Jack Stillings
- Nick Stahl as Tommy Spencer
- Richard Jenkins as Willard Sprague
- Margo Martindale as Dorothy
- Mary Kay Place as Claire Spencer
- Hal Holbrook as Sheriff Rogers
- Chris Freihofer as Les Hector
- Woody Watson as Glen Briggs
- Wally Welch as R.J. Prichard
- Larry Flynn as Jim Nutter
- Maggie Moore as Janice
- Vernon Grote as Fast Food Customer
- Gary Ragland as Lee
- Carolyn Wickwire as Mrs. Rogers

== Critical reception ==
On Rotten Tomatoes, Eye of God has an approval rating of 75% based on 20 reviews.

Entertainment Weekly gave the film an "A-" grade with the response, "Spare, elegant, and harrowing, this trickily plotted tale of murder within the desolation of small-town Oklahoma attains a disturbing power that can earn comparison with those true-life novels of American brutality, In Cold Blood and The Executioner's Song", adding "The talented Plimpton has never been this alive on screen — she makes Ainsley's very ignorance complex and alluring — and Anderson creates what may be the most vividly scary and authentic portrait of a sociopathic ex-con since Dustin Hoffman in Straight Time."

Roger Ebert awarded the film 3/4 stars and said, "Martha Plimpton's performance is the center of the movie, quiet and strong", and the San Francisco Chronicle opined, "Moody, sympathetic and shot through with a sense of apprehension, Eye of God marks an impressive debut for writer-director Tim Blake Nelson." The Austin Chronicle gave 3/5 stars and wrote, "Despite the fact that the film's whole never quite equals its parts, Eye of God provides a fascinating ride and evocative glimpses of ordinary people in the throes of crisis."

The A.V. Club commented, "Eye Of God is structurally reminiscent of Atom Egoyan's Exotica and as a whole, it has that film's detached, observant, strangely humane tone. But Nelson makes the material his own, and, in the process, creates a fractured tragedy that is one of the more auspicious debuts of recent years." In 2013, the publication described the film as Nelson's best.

=== Accolades ===
- Independent Spirit Awards
  - Someone to Watch Award – Tim Blake Nelson (nominated)
- Seattle International Film Festival
  - American Independent Award – Tim Blake Nelson (winner)
- Sundance Film Festival
  - Grand Jury Prize for Dramatic Feature (nominated)
- Tokyo International Film Festival
  - Bronze Award (winner)
