= The Golden Voice (2006 film) =

- Directed by: Gregory Cahill
- Written by: Gregory Cahill
- Produced by: Gregory Cahill; Matthew Caron
- Starring: Sophea Pel; Narin Pot; Chai Yong; Daren Thach; Theavy Van
- Cinematography: John Matysiak
- Edited by: Matthew Caron
- Music by: Devin McNulty
- Production company: Rising Falcon Cinema
- Release date: 2006
- Country: United States

The Golden Voice is a 2006 American short drama film written, produced, and directed by Gregory Cahill. It stars Sophea Pel as Ros Serey Sothear.

== Plot ==
The Golden Voice is about famous Cambodian rock singer, Ros Serey Sothear, and her struggle for survival. She learns that her voice is her only chance to overcome the communist Pol Pot.

== Cast ==
- Sophea Pel as Ros Serey Sothear
- Narin Pot as Chenda
- Chai Yong as Khmer Rouge Leader
- Daren Thach as Male Soldier
- Theavy Van as Female Soldier

== Production ==
The film was shot in Cambodia and in Los Angeles.

== Accolades ==
List of awards and nominations
Award / Film festival	Category	Result	Ref(s)
LA Shorts Fest	Special Recognition	Won	
CamboFest	Best Short Film	Won	
San Joaquin Film Festival	Best Short Film	Won	
Rhode Island International Film Festival	Official Selection	—N/a	
Dallas Asian Film Festival	Official Selection	—N/a	
Woods Hole Film Festival	Official Selection	—N/a	
Boulder Asian Film Festival	Official Selection	—N/a	
Beverly Hills Film Festival	Official Selection	—N/a	
New Orleans Film Festival	Official Selection	—N/a	
San Diego Asian Film Festival	Official Selection	—N/a	
DisOrient Film Festival	Official Selection	—N/a	
FirstGlance Philadelphia Film Festival	Official Selection	—N/a	
