= Blackjack Mountain (Oklahoma) =

Mountain in Oklahoma, United States

- Location within Oklahoma

Highest point
- Elevation: 1,250 ft (380 m)
- Coordinates: 34°23′23″N 95°15′01″W

Geography
- Location: Pushmataha County, Oklahoma, U.S.
- Parent range: Ouachita Mountains
- Topo map(s): USGS Wildhorse Mountain, Kosoma, Finley, Cloudy and Nashoba

Blackjack Mountain is 17 miles (27 km) long mountain ridge trending from northeast to southwest in Pushmataha County, Oklahoma. It is one of several such ridges in the Ouachita Mountains range. (Note: Other ridges in the Ouachita range are the Winding Stair, Rich, Kiamichi and Jackfork.) The highest peak has an elevation of 1,250 feet (380 m). The town of Rattan, Oklahoma is south of Blackjack Mountain.

== Etymology ==
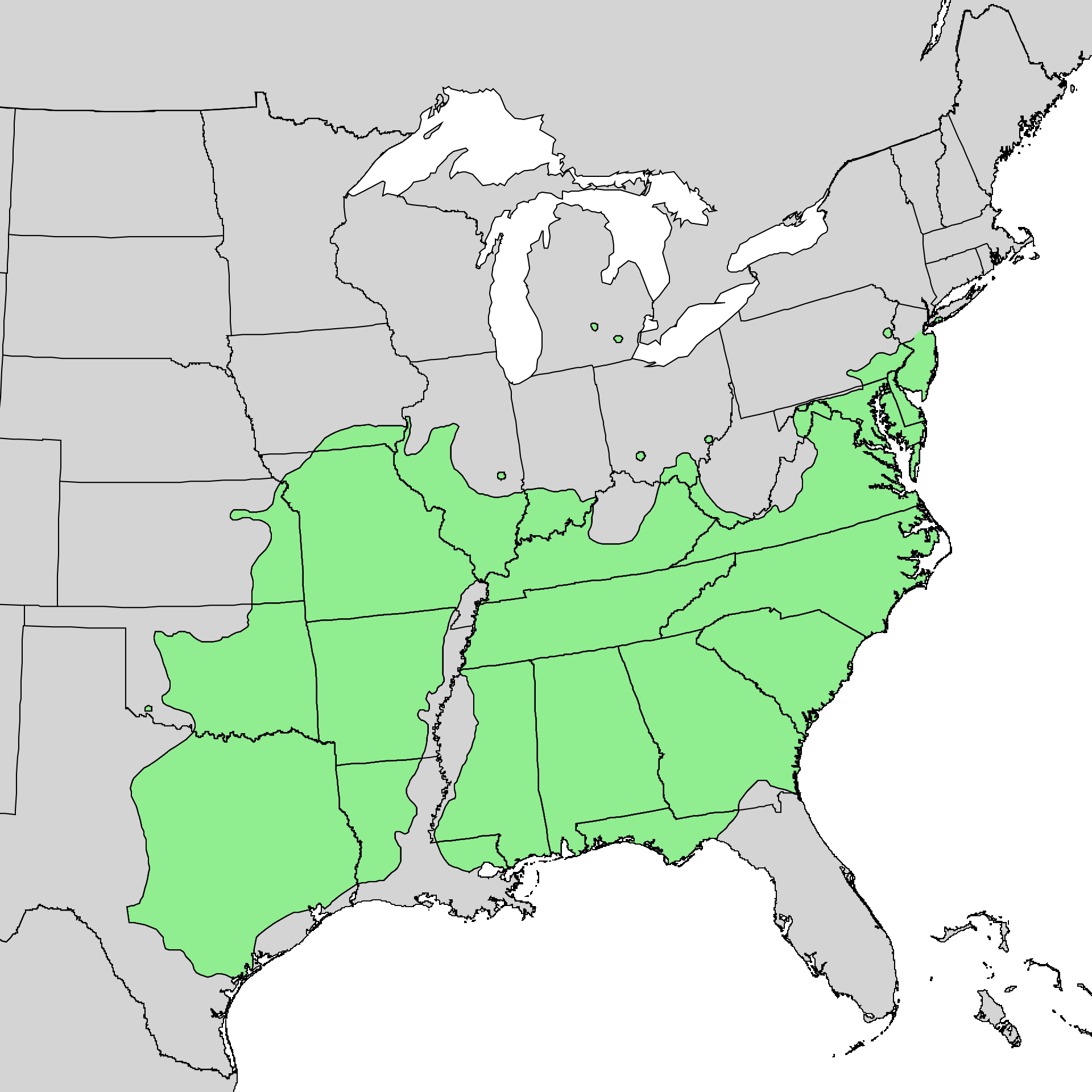
Range of Blackjack oak

The etymology of the name is unclear. It is reasonable to believe that the mountain was named for the species of tree named Blackjack Oak (a.k.a. Quercus marilandica). The tree is indigenous to the area of the United States that extends from Maryland to Florida along the Atlantic coast to east Texas and eastern Oklahoma. It would have been very familiar to the Choctaws in both their new and old homelands.

== History ==
Blackjack Mountain is most notable as the place where mustangs have roamed freely for many years. Many writers have claimed that these horses are descended from those left behind by Spanish conquistadores who traveled in this part of North America during the early 1500s. This area became part of the vast Louisiana Purchase that the United States government acquired from France in 1803. By the 1830s, the immigration of millions of Europeans had created almost constant conflict with the Native American tribes that had long lived in the Southeastern states. The government, especially under the administration of President Andrew Jackson, adopted a policy called "Indian Removal," decided to resettle the natives to seemingly uninhabited land, then called "Indian Territory," west of the Mississippi River. One of these tribes, the Choctaw was granted a large part of the territory bounded on the east by Arkansas Territory, on the south by the Red River of the South and on the west by the 100th parallel. The U.S. Army forced the Choctaws to leave their former homelands and move to their new area in 1831. Thus, Blackjack Mountain and its mustangs became the property of the Choctaw Nation.

The original Spanish horses began breeding with other horses almost as soon as they congregated on the mountain. This led to changes in their gene pool. By the mid 19th Century, they became known collectively as "Choctaw ponies."

== See also ==
- Spanish Mustang
- History of Pushmataha County, Oklahoma
