= Tim Blake Nelson =

American actor (born 1964)

- Nelson in 2026
- Born: Timothy Blake Nelson; May 11, 1964 (age 62); Tulsa, Oklahoma, U.S.
- Education: Brown University (BA); Juilliard School (GrDip)
- Occupations: Actor; writer; director
- Years active: 1989–present
- Spouse: Lisa Benavides (m. 1994)
- Children: 3

Timothy Blake Nelson (born May 11, 1964) is an American actor, director, and writer. Described as a "modern character actor", his roles include Delmar O'Donnell in O Brother, Where Art Thou? (2000), Gideon in Minority Report (2002), Doctor Steve Pendanski in Holes (2003), Doctor Jonathan Jacobo in Scooby-Doo 2: Monsters Unleashed (2004), Danny Dalton Jr. in Syriana (2005), Samuel Sterns / The Leader in the Marvel Cinematic Universe, Richard Schell in Lincoln (2012), the eponymous character of The Ballad of Buster Scruggs (2018), and Henry McCarty in Old Henry (2021). He portrayed Wade Tillman / Looking Glass in the HBO limited series Watchmen (2019), for which he received a Critics' Choice Television Awards nomination for Best Supporting Actor in a Drama Series in 2020.

Nelson's directorial credits include Eye of God (1997), which was nominated for the Sundance Grand Jury Prize and an Independent Spirit Award; O (2001), a modern-day adaptation of Othello; and the Holocaust drama The Grey Zone (2001). Eye of God and The Grey Zone were both adapted from Nelson's own plays. Nelson has also co-directed music videos for Billy Woods and Kenny Segal including "Babylon by Bus" and "Soft Landing". He also co-directed the music video for Armand Hammer feat. Pink Siifu's "Trauma Mic".

== Early life ==
Nelson was born to a Jewish family in Tulsa, Oklahoma, the son of Ruth (née Kaiser), a noted Tulsa social activist and philanthropist, and Don Nelson, a geologist and wildcatter. His maternal uncle is businessman George Kaiser.

His maternal grandparents Herman Geo. Kaiser and Kate Kaiser, daughter of businessman Max Samuel, were from Germany, and left Germany shortly before World War II. They moved to Britain in 1938, where Nelson's mother was born, and immigrated to the United States in 1941. His father's family were Russian-Jewish emigrants.

Nelson attended the Oklahoma Summer Arts Institute at Quartz Mountain Resort Arts and Conference Center in Lone Wolf, Oklahoma.

Nelson is a 1982 graduate of Holland Hall School in Tulsa, and a graduate of Brown University, where he was a classics major as well as senior orator for his class of 1986. At Brown, he studied under philosopher Martha Nussbaum. He is a member of Phi Beta Kappa society. He won the Workman/Driskoll award for excellence in classical studies. He graduated from Juilliard in 1990, a member of Group 19.

== Career ==
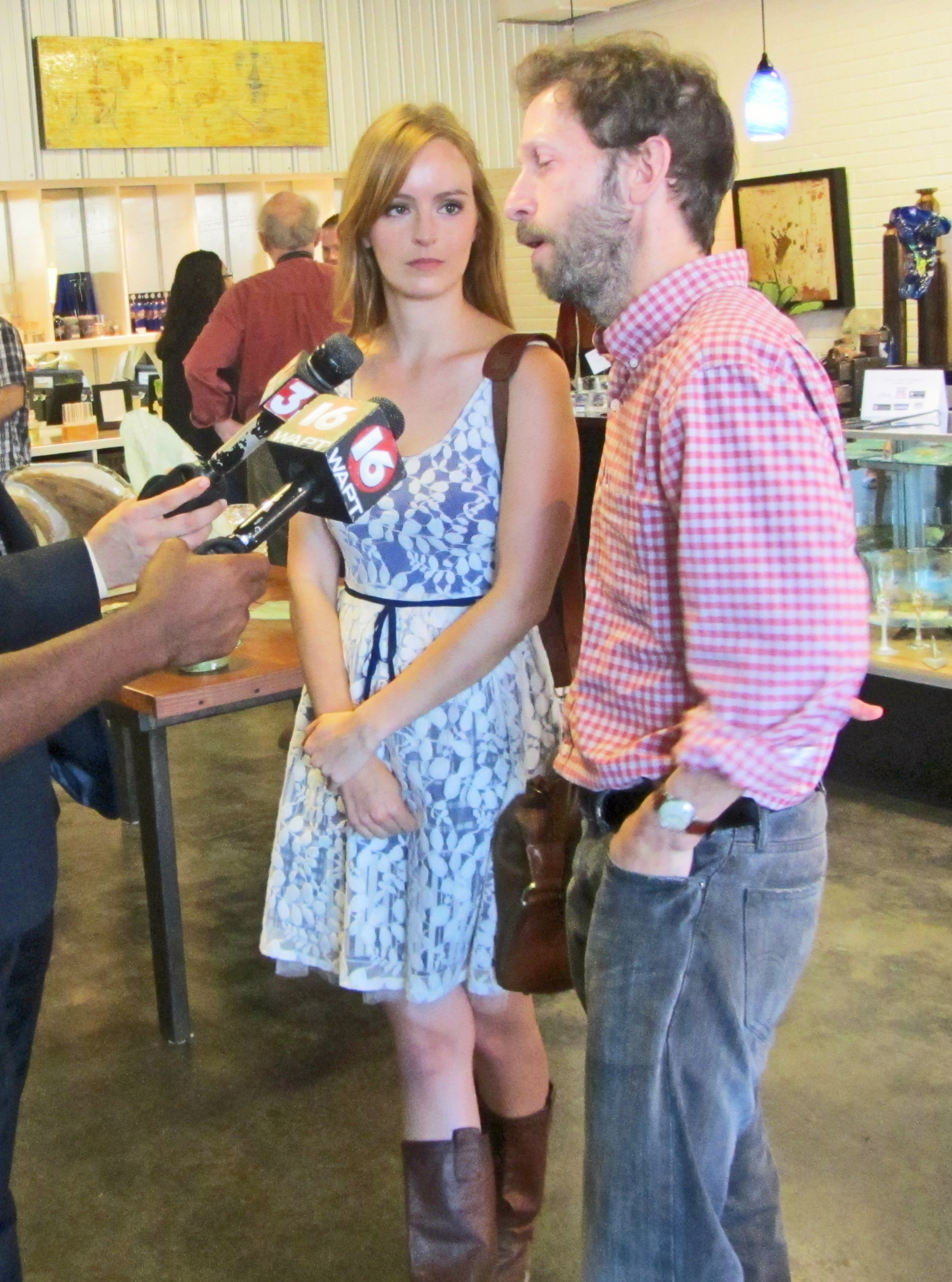
Nelson with Ahna O'Reilly in 2012

Nelson's debut play, Eye of God, was produced at Seattle Repertory Theatre in 1992. The Grey Zone premiered at MCC Theater in New York in 1996, where his 1998 work Anadarko was produced. He was a co-star of the sketch comedy show The Unnaturals, which ran on HA! (later CTV, and would turn into Comedy Central) between 1989 and 1991, alongside Paul Zaloom, John Mariano and Siobhan Fallon Hogan.

Nelson has appeared as an actor in film, TV and theatre. He had a featured role as Delmar in the film O Brother, Where Art Thou? According to directors Joel and Ethan Coen, he was the only one in the cast or crew who had read Homer's Odyssey, a story upon which the film is loosely based. He sang "In the Jailhouse Now" on the film's soundtrack (which received a Grammy Award for Album of the Year in 2002). He has had a number of supporting performances in feature films such as Holes, Minority Report, Syriana and Lincoln. He also appeared in Marvel Comics adaptations The Incredible Hulk, Fantastic Four, and Captain America: Brave New World.

Nelson narrated the 2001 audiobook At the Altar of Speed: The Fast Life and Tragic Death of Dale Earnhardt, Sr. He appeared on stage extensively off-Broadway in New York at theatres including Manhattan Theater Club, Playwrights Horizons, Manhattan Class Company, Soho Repertory Theater, New York Theatre Workshop, and Central Park's Open Air Theater in the Shakespeare plays Richard III, Troilus and Cressida, and A Midsummer Night's Dream.

He has directed film versions of his plays The Grey Zone and Eye of God (for which he received an Independent Spirit Awards nomination for the Someone to Watch Award), and directed two of his original screenplays: Kansas (1998) and Leaves of Grass (2009). He directed the film O, based on Othello and set in a modern-day high school. For Eye of God, he received the Tokyo Bronze Prize at the Tokyo International Film Festival (1997) and the American Independent Award at the Seattle International Film Festival (1997); for O, the Best Director Award at the Seattle International Film Festival (2001); and for The Grey Zone, the National Board of Review's Freedom of Expression Award (2002). Nelson is on the boards of directors of The Actors Center in New York City and the Soho Rep Theatre.

Nelson guest-starred on the CSI: Crime Scene Investigation season 10 episode "Working Stiffs". In the episode "My Brother's Bomber" (aired September 29, 2015) of the PBS investigative series Frontline, he talked about the loss of his friend David Dornstein in the 1988 bombing of Pan Am Flight 103 over Lockerbie, Scotland.

In 2018, Nelson played the title character in The Ballad of Buster Scruggs, a western anthology film by Joel and Ethan Coen, after receiving the original script 16 years prior, in 2002. The film was released on Netflix on November 16, after a limited theatrical run, and received positive reviews, with many highlighting Nelson's performance and his overall segment. He portrayed Ralph Myers in the drama/legal drama Just Mercy (2019). In January 2023, he joined the cast of Dune: Part Two, though his role was ultimately cut out of the film.

In December 2025, Nelson published his second novel, Superhero, a satirical behind-the-scenes look at the making of a Marvel-like Hollywood movie.

=== Playwright ===
Nelson's play Socrates opened at The Public Theater in 2019, starring Michael Stuhlbarg. It was favorably received by numerous publications, including the New York Times.

== Personal life ==
Nelson resides in New York City with his wife, Lisa Benavides, and their three sons. One of his sons is Henry Nelson, a film director who directed Asleep in My Palm. On May 8, 2009, he was inducted as an honorary member of the University of Tulsa's Beta of Oklahoma chapter of the Phi Beta Kappa national collegiate honor society. Nelson currently serves on the Board of Trustees of Bryn Mawr College, the school from which his mother Ruth Nelson graduated in 1958.

== Filmography ==
Key
| † | Denotes productions that have not yet been released |

=== Film ===
| Year | Title | Role | Notes |
|---|---|---|---|
| 1992 | This Is My Life | Dennis | |
| 1993 | Motel Blue 19 | Adult Luther (voice) | Uncredited |
| 1994 | Amateur | Young Detective | |
| 1995 | Heavyweights | Roger Johnson | |
| 1996 | Joe's Apartment | Cockroach (voice) | |
| 1997 | Eye of God | —N/a | Director and writer |
| 1997 | Donnie Brasco | FBI Technician | |
| 1997 | Prix Fixe | Busboy | Short film |
| 1998 | The Thin Red Line | Pvt. Lysander Tills | |
| 1998 | Kansas | —N/a | Short film; director and writer |
| 2000 | Hamlet | Flight captain | |
| 2000 | O Brother, Where Art Thou? | Delmar O'Donnell | |
| 2001 | O | —N/a | Director |
| 2001 | The Grey Zone | —N/a | Director, writer, producer and editor |
| 2002 | The Good Girl | Bubba | |
| 2002 | Cherish | Daly | |
| 2002 | Minority Report | Gideon | |
| 2003 | A Foreign Affair | Jake Adams | Also executive producer |
| 2003 | Holes | Dr. Kiowa "Mom" Pendanski | |
| 2003 | Wonderland | Billy Deverell | |
| 2004 | Scooby-Doo 2: Monsters Unleashed | Dr. Jonathan Jacobo | |
| 2004 | The Last Shot | Marshal Paris | |
| 2004 | Bereft | Dennis | |
| 2004 | Meet the Fockers | Officer Vern LeFlore | |
| 2005 | The Amateurs | Barney Macklehatton | |
| 2005 | My Suicidal Sweetheart | Various | |
| 2005 | The Big White | Gary | |
| 2005 | Syriana | Danny Dalton | |
| 2006 | Come Early Morning | Uncle Tim | |
| 2006 | The Darwin Awards | Perp | |
| 2006 | Hoot | Curly | |
| 2006 | Fido | Mr. Theopolis | |
| 2007 | The Astronaut Farmer | Kevin Munchak | |
| 2008 | The Incredible Hulk | Samuel Sterns | |
| 2008 | American Violet | David Cohen | |
| 2009 | Saint John of Las Vegas | Militant Ned | |
| 2009 | Leaves of Grass | Bolger | Also director, writer and producer |
| 2011 | Flypaper | Peanut Butter | |
| 2011 | Yelling to the Sky | Coleman | |
| 2011 | Detachment | Mr. Wiatt | |
| 2011 | The Big Year | Fuchs | |
| 2012 | Big Miracle | Pat Lafayette | |
| 2012 | Lincoln | Richard Schell | |
| 2013 | Blue Caprice | Ray | |
| 2013 | As I Lay Dying | Anse | |
| 2013 | Child of God | Sheriff Fate | |
| 2013 | Snake and Mongoose | Mike McAllister | |
| 2014 | The Homesman | Freighter | |
| 2014 | The Sound and the Fury | Father | |
| 2014 | Kill the Messenger | Alan Fenster | |
| 2014 | Rickover: The Birth of Nuclear Power | Admiral Hyman Rickover | Documentary |
| 2015 | Anesthesia | Adam Zarrow | Also director, writer and producer |
| 2015 | Fantastic Four | Dr. Harvey Allen | |
| 2015 | The Long Home | Hovington | Unreleased |
| 2016 | The Confirmation | Vaughn | |
| 2016 | Colossal | Garth | |
| 2016 | Billy Lynn's Long Halftime Walk | Wayne Pfister | |
| 2017 | Deidra & Laney Rob a Train | Truman | |
| 2017 | The Vanishing of Sidney Hall | Johan Tidemand | |
| 2017 | The Institute | Dr. Lemelle | |
| 2017 | The Long Home | Hovington | Unreleased |
| 2018 | Monster | Leroy Sawicki | |
| 2018 | The Ballad of Buster Scruggs | Buster Scruggs | Segment: "The Ballad of Buster Scruggs" |
| 2019 | The Report | Raymond Nathan | |
| 2019 | The Hustle | Portnoy | Uncredited |
| 2019 | Angel Has Fallen | Vice President Martin Kirby | |
| 2019 | Just Mercy | Ralph Myers | |
| 2019 | Zeroville | Professor Kohn | |
| 2019 | The Jesus Rolls | Doctor | |
| 2021 | Naked Singularity | Angus | |
| 2021 | Old Henry | Henry | Also executive producer |
| 2021 | Ghosts of the Ozarks | Torb | |
| 2021 | National Champions | Rodger Cummings | |
| 2021 | Nightmare Alley | Carny Boss | |
| 2022 | Guillermo del Toro's Pinocchio | The Black Rabbits (voice) | |
| 2023 | Ghosted | Borislov | |
| 2023 | Ninety-Five Senses | Coy (voice) | Short film |
| 2023 | Asleep in My Palm | Tom | Also producer |
| 2024 | The Bricklayer | O'Malley | |
| 2024 | Bang Bang | Bernard 'Bang Bang' Rozyski | |
| 2024 | Dune: Part Two | Undisclosed character | Deleted scenes |
| 2024 | Greedy People | Wallace Chetlo | |
| 2024 | The Invisibles | Charlie | |
| 2025 | Atropia | Mr. Speaker | |
| 2025 | Captain America: Brave New World | Samuel Sterns / The Leader | |
| 2025 | On the End | Tom Ferreira | |
| 2025 | The Testament of Ann Lee | Pastor Reuben Wright | |
| 2026 | The Leader | Marshall Applewhite | Also executive producer |
| 2026 | The Life and Deaths of Wilson Shedd † | —N/a | Director, writer and producer; Post-production |
| 2027 | The Rescue † | TBA | Post-production |

=== Television ===
| Year | Title | Role | Notes |
|---|---|---|---|
| 1989–1991 | The Unnaturals | Recurring characters | |
| 1995 | House of Buggin' | Kidnapper | Episode: "The Paco Vasquez Story" |
| 1996 | Dead Man's Walk | Johnny Carthage | 3 episodes |
| 2005 | Stella | Mountain Man | Episode: "Camping" |
| 2005 | Warm Springs | Tom Loyless | Television film |
| 2006 | Haskett's Chance | —N/a | Pilot; director |
| 2009 | CSI: Crime Scene Investigation | Paulie Krill | Episode: "Working Stiffs" |
| 2011 | CHAOS | Casey Malick | 13 episodes |
| 2011 | Modern Family | Hank | Episode: "Dude Ranch" |
| 2012–2015 | Black Dynamite | Chief Humphrey Magillahorn / Donald Sterling / PBS Executive / XXX Film Director (voice) | 4 episodes |
| 2014 | Klondike | Meeker | 6 episodes |
| 2015, 2019 | Unbreakable Kimmy Schmidt | Randy | 4 episodes |
| 2015 | Z: The Beginning of Everything | —N/a | Episode: "Pilot"; director |
| 2015 | For Justice | Ochs Rainey | Pilot |
| 2017 | Wormwood | Sidney Gottlieb | 4 episodes |
| 2018 | Dallas & Robo | The Woodsman (voice) | 8 episodes |
| 2019 | Watchmen | Wade Tillman / Looking Glass | 6 episodes |
| 2020, 2025 | Big City Greens | Grampa Ernest Green (voice) | 3 episodes |
| 2022 | Lost Ollie | Zozo (voice) | 4 episodes |
| 2022 | Guillermo del Toro's Cabinet of Curiosities | Nick Appleton | Episode: "Lot 36" |
| 2022 | George & Tammy | Roy Acuff | Episode: "The Race Is On" |
| 2023 | Poker Face | Keith Owens | Episode: "The Future of the Sport" |
| 2025 | The Lowdown | Dale Washberg | 3 episodes |

=== Plays written ===
- Eye of God (1992)
- The Grey Zone (1996)
- Anadarko (1998)
- Socrates (2019)
- And Then We Were No More (2025)

=== Novels ===
- City of Blows (2023)
- Superhero: A Novel (2025)

=== Video games ===
| Year | Game | Role |
|---|---|---|
| 2008 | The Incredible Hulk | Samuel Sterns (voice) |

=== Music videos ===
| Year | Artist(s) | Title | Notes |
|---|---|---|---|
| 2023 | Billy Woods and Kenny Segal | "Soft Landing" | Director, with Henry Nelson |
| 2023 | Billy Woods and Kenny Segal featuring ShrapKnel | "Babylon by Bus" | Director, with Henry Nelson |
| 2023 | Armand Hammer featuring Pink Siifu | "Trauma Mic" | Director, with Henry Nelson |
| 2024 | ShrapKnel | "Deep Space 9 Millie Pulled a Pistol" | Director, with Henry Nelson |
