= Potsy Ponciroli =

American filmmaker

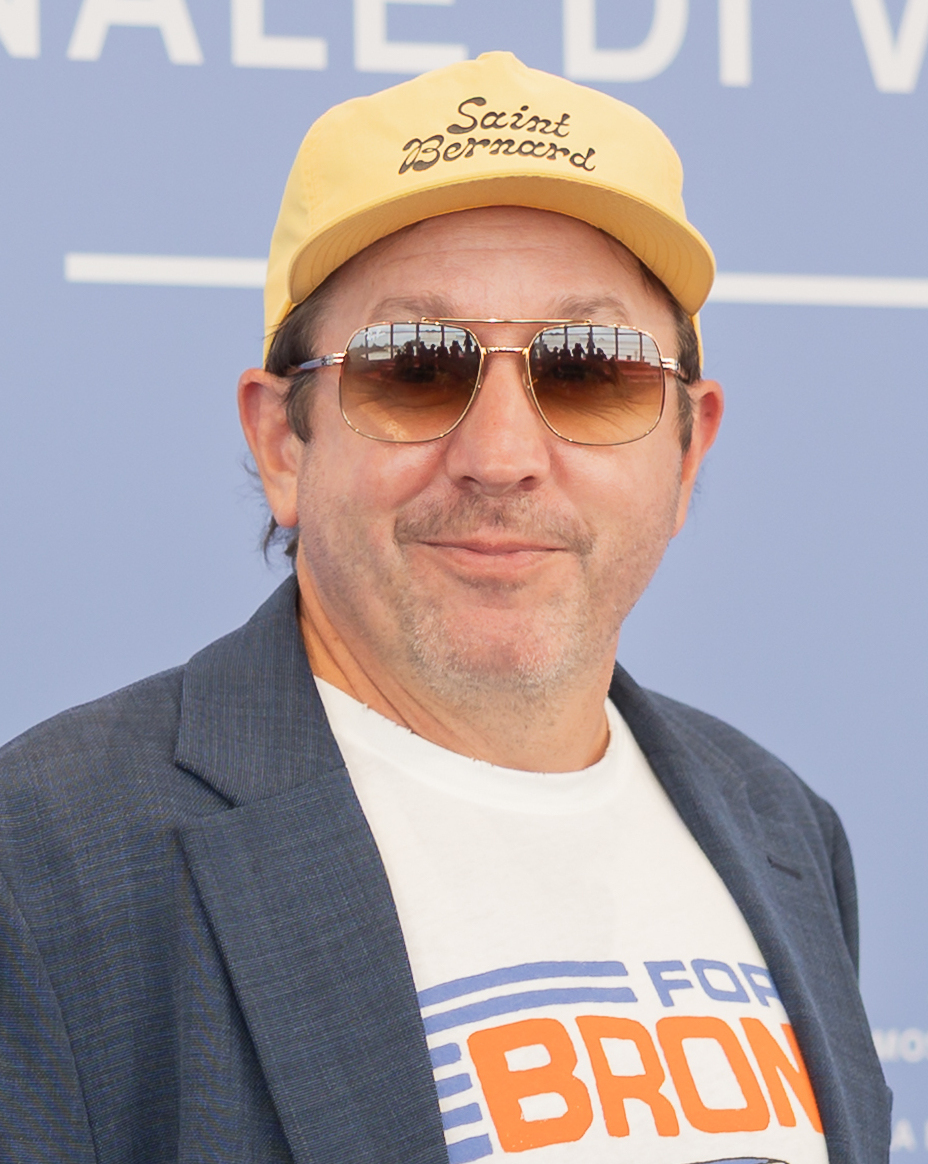
- Ponciroli in 2025
- Born: February 17, 1981 (age 45); Los Angeles, California, U.S.
- Occupation: Filmmaker
- Years active: 2004–present

Potsy Ponciroli is an American film director, screenwriter and producer. He directed the films Old Henry (2021), Greedy People (2024), and Motor City (2025).

== Life and career ==
Ponciroli started his career as a director of commercials and music videos. In 2016, he co-created the sitcom Still the King. He co-founded Hideout Pictures, which produced Jay and Silent Bob Reboot and Ted K, among others.

Ponciroli's feature film debut Old Henry premiered out of competition at the 78th Venice International Film Festival to critical acclaim. In 2023, he directed the dark comedy film Greedy People. His following film, Motor City, starring Alan Ritchson, Shailene Woodley and Ben Foster was selected to be screened at the 82nd Venice International Film Festival, in the Venice Spotlight sidebar. He has been attached to write the sequel of The Goonies.

== Filmography ==
- Old Henry (2021)
- Greedy People (2024)
- Motor City (2025)
- The Rescue (2027)
