= List of K.C. Undercover episodes =

K.C. Undercover is an American comedy television series created by Corinne Marshall that aired on Disney Channel from January 18, 2015 to February 2, 2018. The series stars Zendaya, Veronica Dunne, Kamil McFadden, Trinitee Stokes, Tammy Townsend, and Kadeem Hardison.

== Series overview ==
| Season | Episodes | Originally released | |
| Season | Episodes | First released | Last released |
|---|---|---|---|
| 1 | 27 | January 18, 2015 | January 24, 2016 |
| 2 | 24 | March 6, 2016 | January 13, 2017 |
| 3 | 24 | July 7, 2017 | February 2, 2018 |

== Episodes ==
=== Season 1 (2015–16) ===
| No. overall | No. in season | Title | Directed by | Written by | Original release date | Prod. code | U.S. viewers (millions) |
|---|---|---|---|---|---|---|---|
| 1 | 1 | "Pilot" | Jon Rosenbaum | Teleplay by : Rob Lotterstein and Corinne Marshall; Story by : Corinne Marshall | January 18, 2015 | 101 | 3.51 |
During her first undercover assignment as a spy, K.C. Cooper gets ready for her first mission. Her parents, Kira and Craig Cooper, are also spies. However, her younger brother, Ernie Cooper, is unaware about K.C. and her parents being a spy, and her best friend Marisa is also unaware about her best friend's secret life. For her first assignment, K.C. is supposed to catch another teenage spy and crack down the code that is used for a dangerous virus. Unfortunately for her, K.C.'s first mission is also on the night of her high school dance, and she is challenged on whether to go through with her mission or go skip the mission and go to her school dance. Guest stars: Trevor Jackson as Lincoln, Tony Cavalero as Wally, Ashley Fink as Reena, Ashlee Fuss as Juli Absent: Trinitee Stokes as Judy Cooper
| 2 | 2 | "My Sister from Another Mother... Board" | Jon Rosenbaum | Rob Lotterstein | January 25, 2015 | 102 | 3.05 |
K.C. tries to tell her parents that Ernie is ready to be a spy, even though he is clumsy. They then introduce them to Judy, who is a robot disguised to be a 10-year-old, and tell Ernie that K.C and their parents are spies. K.C. takes Ernie on a mission and does not tell Craig or Kira to prove to them that Ernie is ready to be a spy. He crashes a van into the museum because he was parked in a loading zone and the police told him to move it, but he did not know how to drive. At the end, he becomes a spy after he reroutes the GPS of the person K.C. could not stop on the mission to their home. Guest star: Rick Hall as Agent
| 3 | 3 | "Give Me a 'K'! Give Me a 'C'!" | Jon Rosenbaum | Rob Lotterstein | February 8, 2015 | 103 | 2.22 |
Marisa wants K.C. to try out for cheerleading with her so they can spend more time together. Even though K.C. doesn't want to, she agrees anyway because her spy obligations have kept her from being able to spend time with Marisa, who can't know she is a spy. When K.C. has to go on a last-minute mission at the airport, she has to bail on Marisa again and needs to apologize to her. Realizing that he treats K.C. better than Ernie, Craig tries to bond with Ernie by taking him out to play sports, but Ernie is not good at sports and isn't enjoying them. Judy struggles to get along with Quinn, an eight year old human girl. Guest stars: Mckenna Grace as Quinn, Leah Bateman as Alina
| 4 | 4 | "Off the Grid" | Jon Rosenbaum | Darin Henry | February 15, 2015 | 106 | 2.76 |
K.C. and Ernie get a visit from their grandparents, Pops and Grandma Gayle, who are both retired spies who formerly worked for the Organization that K.C. and her family work in now. Marisa then comes to their house but is immediately disliked by Grandma Gayle, who refers to her as a bad influence. Meanwhile, Kira and Craig are on a mission to capture Regina Honey, a rich inventor. Later, Regina holds them as hostages to use them as live test targets for lasers for possible criminal buyers. K.C. and Ernie then team up with their grandparents to save Kira and Craig. It is then revealed that Pops and Grandma Gayle are no stranger to Regina Honey, and that they faced her once before. Guest stars: Charlie Robinson as Pops, Roz Ryan as Grandma, Diane Delano as Honey, Tony Cavalero as Wally Absent: Trinitee Stokes as Judy Cooper
| 5 | 5 | "Photo Bombed" | Jon Rosenbaum | Rob Lotterstein | March 1, 2015 | 104 | 2.60 |
Marisa becomes a finalist for a contest to get a photo featured in magazines and billboards, but her photo is of K.C. After Craig tells K.C. that she shouldn't let Marisa enter the contest with a photo of her, K.C. tries to stop Marisa from entering the contest with a picture of her, which caused a row between them. Then Marisa takes a stand and says they shouldn't be friends anymore. In the end, K.C. tells Marisa that she is a spy for a secret Organization that works against The Other Side. Meanwhile, Craig and Ernie make Judy do all of the chores Kira gave them.
| 6 | 6 | "How K.C. Got Her Swag Back" | Jon Rosenbaum | Jenn Lloyd & Kevin Bonani | March 8, 2015 | 108 | 2.39 |
Guest star: Shainu Bala as Mikal Absent: Trinitee Stokes as Judy Cooper, Kadeem Hardison as Craig Cooper
| 7 | 7 | "Daddy's Little Princess" | Jon Rosenbaum | Teri Schaffer & Raynelle Swilling | March 29, 2015 | 107 | 1.97 |
While Judy and Kira are away on a mission, K.C., Craig and Ernie receive an assignment to protect an African prince named Promomomo and to hide him from enemy assassins from his neighboring country. Promomono quickly becomes interested in K.C.; she has mutual feelings for him, too. Craig then becomes over-protective for his daughter and threatens the prince to stay away from K.C.. Promomomo then acts aloof around K.C., hoping to not upset Craig. Meanwhile, Ernie is used as bait and waits at an embassy, sitting in for the prince, but is too paranoid to eat any of the food served to him. In the end, however, it is shown that the prince's assassin was his personal attaché who is a native from the country that Promomomo's country was at war with. Guest stars: Tom Williamson as Prince Promomomo, Erron Jay as Olu Absent: Trinitee Stokes as Judy Cooper, Tammy Townsend as Kira Cooper
| 8 | 8 | "Assignment: Get That Assignment" | Kadeem Hardison | Rob Lotterstein | April 6, 2015 | 118 | 1.54 |
Marisa turns in a paper report based on one of K.C.'s recent missions, not realizing that it could blow K.C.'s cover as a spy. K.C. and Marisa then try to get the paper back from her teacher, Mr. Forman. K.C., disguised as a substitute teacher, goes into the teacher lounge, but is unsuccessful in retrieving the paper. Agent Beverly keeps calling K.C. to ask for the report and later disables her spy equipment until K.C. gives her the report. Meanwhile, Judy's robotic friend Trudy visits, but they get into a fight over who is a better robot. Guest stars: Sherri Shepherd as Beverly, James DiGiacomo as Petey, David Shatraw as Mr. Forman, Madison Horcher as Trudy, Jaime Moyer as Mrs. Goldfeder Absent: Tammy Townsend as Kira Cooper, Kadeem Hardison as Craig Cooper
| 9 | 9 | "Spy-anoia Will Destroy Ya" | Rich Correll | Eileen Conn | April 19, 2015 | 105 | 2.58 |
K.C. gets mad when her English teacher gives her a B and she thinks he is an undercover spy. It turns out that K.C. is just being paranoid. Meanwhile, Ernie finally has a girlfriend, whose name is Jolie, but when he brings her home, K.C. thinks she is an undercover spy as well. After attempting to prove it, and failing, K.C. eventually accidentally splashes some ketchup on Jolie's shirt which causes her to lose concentration and speak Russian. Realizing she was right all along, K.C. tricks Jolie into following her to school by pretending she has hidden spy documents in her locker and is going to retrieve them. K.C. finally gets Jolie to admit she's a Russian spy, there to obtain K.C.'s family weaknesses. After defeating her in a fight, K.C. gets Jolie to break up with Ernie. K.C also obtains a pair of earrings that are actually spy gadgets from Jolie. Special guest star: Bella Thorne as Jolie Guest star: Kurt Scholler as Mr. Enright Absent: Trinitee Stokes as Judy Cooper
| 10 | 10 | "Double Crossed Part 1" | Joel Zwick and Jody Margolin Hahn | Cat Davis & Eddie Quintana and Eileen Conn | May 29, 2015 | 109–110 | 2.40 |
K.C. has to go on an undercover mission with the Junior Spy of the Year Brett Willis. They must pretend to be a couple, though K.C. initially dislikes him. K.C. becomes jealous when Brett begins dating Marisa, who is aware that he is a spy. Later, Marisa ends their relationship. K.C. and Brett develop feelings for each other after they go undercover for a dancing competition. Craig and Kira's 20th anniversary is coming and Kira is upset that Craig does not want a big party to celebrate. Kira receives flowers from Zane, Craig's ex-partner, who became a double agent prior to K.C.'s birth due to jealousy that Kira did not like him. Craig allowed Zane to escape in exchange for his life. In a note to Kira, Zane informs the Coopers that he is planning revenge against them. Later, Brett tells the family that Zane is imprisoned and that he had sent the flowers and note from a computer at the prison. Brett then calls his father, Zane, to inform him that the Coopers believed his false story regarding Zane's imprisonment. Guest star: Ross Butler as Brett Willis
| 11 | 11 | "Double Crossed Part 2" | Jon Rosenbaum | Rob Lotterstein | May 30, 2015 | 111 | 1.82 |
K.C. starts hanging out with Brett more often, but Kira is suspicious of him. Craig thinks she is being paranoid. Brett convinces K.C. to go with him to a Beyoncé concert out of state, but he tricks K.C. and actually takes her to Zane's barn, where she is then tied up. Zane has created a look-alike K.C. through laser cosmetic surgery. He sends the look-alike to the Cooper household to pose as the real K.C. Meanwhile, Judy becomes obsessed with a character in Ernie's video game. Guest stars: Ross Butler as Brett Willis, Francois Chau as Zane
| 12 | 12 | "Double Crossed Part 3" | Jon Rosenbaum | Darin Henry | May 31, 2015 | 112 | 3.02 |
K.C. is captured by Zane and nobody knows because he created a K.C. look-alike whose name is Bernice, but Marisa is starting to realize K.C. is not the real K.C when she agrees to go to a party with Marissa. Then the K.C. look-alike locks Marisa in the barn with K.C. after Marisa realizes that the K.C. look-alike does not know that Marisa knows that K.C is a spy. However, Marisa has K.C.'s lipstick and K.C. breaks their handcuffs. K.C. then goes to the Organization to stop the K.C. look-alike and Brett. After a fight with Brett, K.C knocks him out and tells him that she's breaking up with him. Meanwhile, Craig and Kira finally realize the K.C. look-alike is fake and go to the Organization, but have make a decision on who is the real K.C. when the K.C. look-alike arrives. Zane holds Ernie and Judy hostage at the Cooper house, but Craig defeats him while Kira distracts him. Guest stars: Ross Butler as Brett Willis, Francois Chau as Zane
| 13 | 13 | "Stakeout Takeout" | Jon Rosenbaum | Darin Henry | June 7, 2015 | 117 | 2.52 |
When K.C. is planning to go to Miami with Marisa for a vacation, Craig tells K.C. she must go on a stakeout to catch a notorious robber. During a phone call, she learned her dad lied so she could stay and she was never assigned to the case. K.C ends up not talking to Craig. Meanwhile, Ernie is mad at his dad and K.C. because they both think he's just a computer geek. He goes to El Froyo Loco and sees the notorious robber and calls K.C. for help, but K.C. wants him to take the robber out to give him a chance to "bake the biscuits" and prove to his dad that he is more than just the computer guy. After the mission K.C. makes it to the beach. In a side story, Craig keeps getting mad at the takeout restaurant guy who tries to overcharge him for food he didn't want or order. Guest stars: Sherri Shepherd as Beverly, Paras Patel as Delivery Guy, Daniel David Stewart as Stanley Absent: Trinitee Stokes as Judy Cooper, Tammy Townsend as Kira Cooper
| 14 | 14 | "The Neighborhood Watchdogs" | Jon Rosenbaum | Darin Henry | June 14, 2015 | 122 | 1.95 |
Mrs. Goldfeder's house has been robbed, so K.C. volunteers her dad to be the neighborhood watchdogs leader. However, he doesn't think it's a good idea. K.C. then tries to sneak around and be the leader, but Craig finds out and yells at K.C. The burglar goes to Mrs. Goldfeder's house and K.C. finds out it's her dad. K.C. and Craig mistake a person who's taking out the garbage for a burglar. Craig lets his teammate, Herb, use the bathroom in the Cooper house only to discover he's the one who's stealing everything. K.C. and Craig apologize to each other. Meanwhile, Judy is trying to get away from her friend at school who likes her and brings in her other friend Petey to pretend they're dating, though Petey really thinks she likes him. Both of them go to El Froyo Loco and Pentatonix tries to help Judy tell Petey that she doesn't like him by performing a rendition of Ariana Grande's "Problem" through the credits, but he still doesn't believe her. Guest stars: Pentatonix, James DiGiacomo as Petey, Jaime Moyer as Mrs. Goldfeder, Fred Stoller as Herb, Dat Pham as Slippy Absent: Tammy Townsend as Kira Cooper
| 15 | 15 | "First Friend" | Jon Rosenbaum | Darin Henry | June 26, 2015 | 125 | 2.91 |
K.C. gets a mission at the University of Maryland to go undercover as a college student and protect the daughter of the president of the United States. K.C. ends up befriending Eliza, the president's daughter even though she can't. Marisa becomes jealous and ends up lying about her name when meeting Eliza. However, Eliza finds out who K.C is and refuses to speak to her. Marisa then uses her party-finding skills to find Eliza and tell K.C. K.C goes to the party and helps protect Eliza against kidnappers after she ditches her Secret Service men, repairing their relationship. Meanwhile, Ernie reveals that he is an adventure scout and Judy wants to join. Guest stars: McKaley Miller as Eliza, James DiGiacomo as Petey, Dat Pham as Slippy
| 16 | 16 | "Operation: Other Side, Part 1" | Jon Rosenbaum | Eileen Conn | July 12, 2015 | 114 | 1.99 |
K.C. and Kira go undercover at a prison facility. K.C.'s disguise is a prisoner and Kira is a correctional officer. Their assignment is to find someone at the prison who is working undercover for a group of bad guys known as The Other Side. K.C. finds out it is Big Ange, a correctional officer, who offers K.C. an opportunity to join The Other Side. Kira tells K.C. that the Organization wants her to accept the offer and continue the undercover mission. K.C. continues her mission without Kira. Meanwhile, Petey keeps bothering Judy. Guest stars: Cocoa Brown as Big Ange, Vivian Marie Lamolli as Scar, James DiGiacomo as Petey Absent: Kamil McFadden as Ernie Cooper, Kadeem Hardison as Craig Cooper
| 17 | 17 | "Operation: Other Side, Part 2" | Kimberly McCullough | Rob Lotterstein | July 19, 2015 | 115 | 2.17 |
K.C. enters the Other Side after finding out that Big Ange is a recruiter from the juvenile correctional facility. However, she has to continue her mission with Kira's assistance. K.C. calls Craig and learns that her mission is to destroy a dangerous missile and recover a biological agent from the Other Side. When she has to take a hand-to-hand combat class it is revealed that Brett is her instructor. Brett helps her get to the missile and she deactivates the missile. However, the Other Side finds her and a fight ensues. When Victor, the leader of the Other Side, tries to destroy K.C., Brett comes in and saves her and helps her escape. Judy wants Craig to buy her a dog. Craig says no because he's more of a cat person. They reach a compromise when Craig buys Judy a robot dog named Snuggles. Guest stars: Ross Butler as Brett Willis, Lee Reherman as Victor Absent: Kamil McFadden as Ernie Cooper, Tammy Townsend as Kira Cooper
| 18 | 18 | "K.C. and the Vanishing Lady" | Rich Correll | Cat Davis & Eddie Quintana | July 26, 2015 | 119 | 2.14 |
The Cooper family is taking a much needed vacation in a resort at the Finger Lakes, far away from the Organization; however, once they arrive in their hotel there is a malfunction causing their reservation to be canceled. Ernie then hacks the system causing the Coopers to get their entire vacation free. During their stay, Judy, who is less than enthusiastic to be on vacation, wants to go back home. Desperate to get her family to relax, K.C. confiscates all of her family's electronic devices and locks them up in the hotel safe. During her stay, K.C. meets a wealthy socialite named Mrs. Vandervoort and her dog who has a necklace filled with jewelries. K.C. and Mrs. Vandervoort then form a friendship; however, the next day K.C. meets Mrs. Vandervoort once again but it is now a different woman. K.C.'s suspicions are then confirmed and the Cooper family is then on a mission to save Mrs. Vandervoort. They soon find out that the woman posing to be Mrs. Vandervoort is her daughter, Sarah Andrews. Sarah and her son, Gabriel, then kidnap Mrs. Vandervoort because they want to claim her fortune, but she is then rescued by the Coopers. Meanwhile, Ernie is left behind in the hotel and finds his way back home. Guest stars: Jonathan Schmock as Lloyd, Natalija Nogulich as Mrs. Vandervoort, Erin Matthews as Mrs. Andrews, Noah Crawford as Gabriel Absent: Veronica Dunne as Marisa Clark
| 19 | 19 | "Debutante Baller" | Jon Rosenbaum | Raynelle Swilling & Teri Schaffer | August 9, 2015 | 113 | 2.05 |
Guest stars: Telma Hopkins as Miss Holley, Reign Edwards as Kitten Absent: Kadeem Hardison as Craig Cooper
| 20 | 20 | "K.C.'s the Man" | Rosario J. Roveto, Jr. | Teri Schaffer & Raynelle Swilling | August 16, 2015 | 127 | 1.89 |
Guest stars: Barrett Carnahan as Spencer, Dante Swain as Aaron, Sully Zack as Lorenzo
| 21 | 21 | "Runaway Robot" | Joel Zwick | Rob Lotterstein | September 7, 2015 | 120–121 | 2.45 |
Judy gets upset when she finds out she does not have a birthday. K.C. locates Judy's creator, Simone, so they can meet each other. K.C. and Judy get into a huge argument. Judy runs away to live with her creator, but since Judy is understanding feelings she gets sad when nobody pays attention to her. Judy runs away again and gets tricked into working for The Other Side. She tries to run away from The Other Side. K.C. and Simone team up and work together to bring Judy home. Meanwhile, Ernie and Marisa find out that they were flirting with each other when they were playing an online video game. Special guest star: Raven-Symoné as Simone Guest stars: Chris Ellis as Christos, James DiGiacomo as Petey, Mike Lane as Paul Absent: Kadeem Hardison as Craig Cooper
| 22 | 22 | "All Howl's Eve" | Jon Rosenbaum | Dava Savel | October 4, 2015 | 123 | 1.97 |
Ernie and Judy's mission to intercept an evil wolf serum at the Central Park Spooktacular goes a little off-track when they meet Emma and Zuri Ross from Jessie. Back home, K.C. and Marisa throw a Halloween shindig of their own, with K.C. deciding to dress up as a spy in hopes of impressing River, the new boy in school but loses her expensive heart bracelet for communication with the Organization. Special guest stars: Peyton List as Emma, Skai Jackson as Zuri Guest stars: Rick Hall as Agent Johnson, James DiGiacomo as Petey, Chris O'Neal as River
| 23 | 23 | "The Get Along Vault" | Phill Lewis | Jenn Lloyd & Kevin Bonani | October 18, 2015 | 126 | 2.39 |
K.C. and Ernie are having trouble getting along, but must work together to figure out how a man is breaking into bank vaults. Outside the bank, K.C. and Ernie monitor the indoor surveillance footage, but begin arguing and wind up missing how the burglar broke into the vault. Along with Judy, they go in to apprehend the burglar but he escapes while they become trapped in the vault with limited oxygen. Meanwhile, it is Mrs. Goldfeder's birthday and she wants to go to a restaurant with Kira to celebrate, but Kira and Craig have already gone to rescue the children. Marisa, who had been planning to go out with K.C., waits with Mrs. Goldfeder in the Cooper house. Mrs. Goldfeder unknowingly eats a chocolate-covered bomb, one of the family's spy gadgets. Marisa knocks out Mrs. Goldfeder with memory spray and tries to move her to help contain the impending explosion. At the bank, Craig has difficulty figuring out how to get the vault open. After arguing, K.C. and Ernie forgive each other and work together to escape, while believing that this was an attempt by their parents to force them to get along. Later, K.C. tells Marisa that the chocolates are not really bombs. Guest star: Jaime Moyer as Mrs. Goldfeder
| 24 | 24 | "Enemy of the State" | Joel Zwick | Eileen Conn | November 8, 2015 | 124 | 2.06 |
Kira is arrested by the Organization for allegedly using explosives to decimate a field office in Hong Kong, and her family has only 72 hours to prove her innocence before she is given over to the Hong Kong authorities. While Kira is imprisoned at the Organization, K.C. and her family rely on Kira's lawyer, Maggie Summer, for advice on catching the real culprit. When Judy catches Maggie uploading suspicious files to a computer in the Cooper house, Maggie shuts her down and ships her to a tropical island, forcing her to take various modes of transportation to get home. Maggie sends Craig to Hong Kong to search for witnesses. When K.C. becomes frustrated by Maggie's lack of progress on the case, Maggie reveals she has found a suspect: a professor named Chuck Maddox. K.C. apprehends Chuck, but learns he is merely an old friend of Kira's. K.C. then learns the woman claiming to be Maggie is actually an imposter named Candace Adams. Kira had trained Candace to become an Organization agent, but later decided Candace was not right for such a job. As revenge, Candace posed as Kira and destroyed the field office. Candace is arrested, and Kira and Judy return home. Guest stars: Arden Myrin as Maggie, Patrick Cassidy as Chuck Maddox, Rick Hall as Agent Johnson, Michelle Noh as Real Maggie Note: Although Veronica Dunne does not appear in the episode as Marisa, she appears out of character alongside Kamil McFadden and Trinitee Stokes in a humorous public service announcement in the post-credits revolving around why the viewer should not send fellow siblings away in the mail.
| 25 | 25 | " 'Twas the Fight Before Christmas" | Joel Zwick | Jenn Lloyd & Kevin Bonani | December 6, 2015 | 116 | 1.29 |
K.C. invites Craig's father, Earl, over for the holidays, but it is discovered that they have been feuding with each other for quite a while because Earl is disappointed in Craig for not going to medical school and continuously brings up how he quit and gave up on that dream. Marisa later stops by and gives the Cooper family a gingerbread house, saying that her family really loves them; however, Ernie finds a card and finds out the Marisa lied. Eventually, Craig has enough and kicks Earl out of the house, but Ernie hacks the airport's computers so Earl can not leave, forcing him and Craig to attempt to make up. Meanwhile, Ernie and Kira go off on a mission, but Kira ends up being captured. After Ernie calls for help and K.C., Craig, and Earl arrive, Craig orders Earl to remain in the car, but he later gets out and discovers that the Cooper family are spies. Craig and Earl later make up, but that doesn't last long after Kira sprays Earl with the memory spray. Guest star: George Wallace as Pappa Earl
| 26 | 26 | "K.C. and Brett: The Final Chapter – Part 1" | David Kendall | Rob Lotterstein | January 17, 2016 | 128 | 2.50 |
Guest star: Sherri Shepherd as Beverly
| 27 | 27 | "K.C. and Brett: The Final Chapter – Part 2" | Jon Rosenbaum | Rob Lotterstein | January 24, 2016 | 129 | 2.02 |
K.C. survives the car incident and both K.C. and Brett think they are safe from Ursula for now but they soon find out that Ursula too survived the car accident. Because the Organization has made it clear that Brett can not come back, the Cooper family is under constant threat of the Organization finding out that they are hiding Brett. K.C. and Ernie both take Brett to a Marissa's Cabin that borders Canada so that Brett will be safe but then Ursula finds them and attacks them. While Ernie and Marissa safely evacuate, K.C and Brett try to take down Ursula. They ride away on horses and Ursula finds them and shoots Brett. K.C. injures Ursula and she rides away saying that she'll be back for her. When K.C. goes to Brett to see if he is dead, Brett reveals that he was wearing a laser-proof t-shirt. To be safe, Brett must ride to Canada and risk never seeing K.C. again. In light of recent events, the Coopers are removed from the Organization and Judy is reassigned to another spy family. Guest star: Sherri Shepherd as Beverly

=== Season 2 (2016–17) ===
| No. overall | No. in season | Title | Directed by | Written by | Original release date | Prod. code | U.S. viewers (millions) |
|---|---|---|---|---|---|---|---|
| 28 | 1 | "Coopers Reactivated!" | Jon Rosenbaum | Rob Lotterstein | March 6, 2016 | 201–202 | 2.08 |
Following the events of the previous season, the Coopers are struggling to get used to their new normal life, while Judy becomes uncomfortable with her new family. By Marissa's suggestion, K. C. tries to participate in social school events, due to how she's seemingly unnoticeable by the public. She eventually decides to become DJ of the school, but ends up ruining one of the dances and is chased out by Darien and a few other boys who are part of the Boys' football team. Meanwhile, one of the Coopers' sworn enemies The Jackal escapes prison, and Judy is the first one to be alerted. She tries to convince her newfound parents to warn the Coopers, but they ended up rebooting her instead. Later on, they are captured by Agent Johnson, who gives them a chance to redeem themselves and get back into The Organization, if they could defeat The Jackal. They eventually agree only if they could get Judy back, though Craig was reluctant into being the one to lure The Jackal in. Judy shows up at the Coopers house, where they find that her memories have been erased, so Ernie is the who has to fix her. At that same moment, Craig train himself to take on The Jackal, but hurts his back, due to working out overtime. At school, K. C. agrees to tutor a failing student in her math class to get her mind off of her spy mission. However, she eventually backs down, when she finds out the student is none other than Darien. By then, she decides to face The Jackal by disguising herself as Craig. Her father begrudgingly agrees, stating other he and others spy agents will be on watch in the crowds of people, while Kira and Ernie will be in the van. They manage to locate him at a carnaval. During the fight on the ferris wheel, Ernie finally manages to restore Judy's memories by smacking her head, and just when The Jackal was earning the upper hand on K. C. by pulling on her leg, Judy saves her by grabbing her arm, giving K. C., a change to kick Jackal off, where he falls to his near-death. The next morning at school, K. C. informs Darien that he passed his math test all on his own and his given the chance to play football again. Pleased with his results, Darien thanks K. C. and he and his team start chanting her name. Back at home, K. C. gets a call from The Organization, informing the Coopers that they're resigned back in. Guest stars: Chris Tavarez as Darien, James Logan as Jackal, Rick Hall as Agent Johnson, Jason Downs as Graham, Yetide Badaki as Penelope, Robert Michael Morris as Agent Nelson
| 29 | 2 | "Do You Want to Know a Secret?" | Jon Rosenbaum | Rob Lotterstein | March 13, 2016 | 203 | 2.14 |
Guest stars: Chris Tavarez as Darien, Kara Royster as Abby
| 30 | 3 | "Rebel with a Cuz" | Robbie Countryman | Eileen Conn | March 20, 2016 | 204 | 1.84 |
Guest stars: Chris Tavarez as Darien, Kara Royster as Abby, Rick Hall as Agent Johnson Absent: Kadeem Hardison as Craig Cooper
| 31 | 4 | "The Mother of All Missions" | Joel Zwick | Darin Henry | April 10, 2016 | 205 | 2.03 |
Special guest star: Jasmine Guy as Erica Guest stars: Kara Royster as Abby, Rick Hall as Agent Johnson, Tyler Poelle as Agent Gibb Absent: Trinitee Stokes as Judy Cooper
| 32 | 5 | "Accidents Will Happen" | Alfonso Ribeiro | Jenn Lloyd & Kevin Bonani | April 17, 2016 | 206 | 1.90 |
Special guest star: Jasmine Guy as Erica Guest stars: Rick Fox as Richard, Kara Royster as Abby, Chris Tavarez as Darien, Rick Hall as Agent Johnson, Robert Gant as Jackson, Ethan Wacker as Collin
| 33 | 6 | "Brainwashed" | Joel Zwick | Rob Lotterstein | April 24, 2016 | 207 | 1.82 |
Erica and Abby force K.C. and Kira to sneak them past hotel security. Abby reveals the truth about her father. And K.C. now knows who the head of the other side is, yet she has no idea of a name or a face. In the end, men from the Organization have him cornered but Abby's father says it is not him, the Organization believes him and he escapes with Erica and Abby. Special guest star: Jasmine Guy as Erica Guest stars: Rick Fox as Richard, Kara Royster as Abby, Rick Hall as Agent Johnson, Robert Gant as Jackson, Ethan Wacker as Collin Absent: Veronica Dunne as Marisa Clark, Trinitee Stokes as Judy Cooper
| 34 | 7 | "The Truth Hurts" | Alfonso Ribeiro | Vincent Brown | May 8, 2016 | 208 | 1.36 |
Guest stars: James DiGiacomo as Petey, Jaime Moyer as Mrs. Goldfeder, Mike McCafferty as Todd Clint Absent: Tammy Townsend as Kira Cooper, Kadeem Hardison as Craig Cooper
| 35 | 8 | "Down in the Dumps" | Gil Junger | Cat Davis | May 15, 2016 | 209 | 1.79 |
Guest stars: Kevin Csolak as Adam, Nikki Castillo as Akina Absent: Trinitee Stokes as Judy Cooper, Tammy Townsend as Kira Cooper
| 36 | 9 | "Dance Like No One's Watching" | Gil Junger | Eddie Quintana | May 22, 2016 | 210 | 1.12 |
K.C. is undercover at a retirement home as a man. Her disguise name is Bernie. The target approaches the Senior Center, speaking to his grandfather. K.C. then goes up to him and tries to hug him, using her own ways to manipulate him. K.C. then goes to meet this woman called Irma and they quickly become friends. They start to do these fun things together, including a coffee and a dance at the Olive Pit, reading magazines together, playing cards. Meanwhile, Judy tries to change Petey's mind when he says machines are stupid. She does things such as electrocute the fridge when Petey touches it and water being sprayed at him. Petey is spooked when he sees the toaster rise and a machine chasing after him. At night, Judy comes into his bedroom with alarms and machines ringing and moving. Judy gets Petey to repeat machines aren't stupid over and over. He then admits that machines aren't stupid. Also, K.C. and Marisa get into an argument when K.C. can't go to the dance to support the Food Bank because she is hanging out with Irma. Eventually, K.C. turns up to the dance. Guest stars: Florence Henderson as Irma, James DiGiacomo as Petey Absent: Tammy Townsend as Kira Cooper, Kadeem Hardison as Craig Cooper
| 37 | 10 | "The Love Jinx" | Joel Zwick | Jenn Lloyd & Kevin Bonani | June 19, 2016 | 211 | 1.46 |
When an agent from the Other Side is arrested, Craig and Kira discover that he is the man who married them; K.C. then points out that Craig and Kira were never legally married. K.C proceeds to attempt to make them a do-over wedding. Meanwhile, she gives advice to Marissa and Ernie which messes up both of their relationships. Craig and Kira get into an argument which ends with them making up and getting re-married. Guest stars: Charlie Robinson as Pops, Rick Hall as Agent Johnson, Nikki Castillo as Akina
| 38 | 11 | "K.C. Levels Up" | Danny Teeson | Eileen Conn | July 10, 2016 | 212 | 1.24 |
K.C finds out that she might be the youngest senior junior special agent ever. But, she has to pass a test. A fallen tree causes their neighbours the Goldfeders to move in with them. On top of all of that, they find out that there may be an assassination attempt and K.C has to find the assassin at a potluck.In the end it turns out that it was her test and she passed and became the youngest senior junior special agent ever. Guest stars: Rick Hall as Agent Johnson, James DiGiacomo as Petey, Jaime Moyer as Mrs. Goldfeder, Philip Labes as Jerk
| 39 | 12 | "Catch Him If You Can" | Eileen Conn | Rob Lotterstein | July 17, 2016 | 213 | 1.31 |
Guest stars: Samm Levine as Noah, Cozi Zuehlsdorff as Pinky
| 40 | 13 | "Sup, Dawg?" | Kadeem Hardison | Eileen Conn | July 24, 2016 | 216 | 1.18 |
New canine spy Dexter, joins K.C. on her next mission as she tries to stop a ring of firework smugglers. When K.C. and Dexter take a disliking to each other, K.C. is taken off the mission with Ernie taking her spot. Ernie is kidnapped by the smugglers until K.C. and Dexter come to save the day. But when K.C. is fired with a shot, Dexter takes the shot. Dexter survives. Meanwhile, Marisa gives Judy some of her old dolls but is disappointed when Judy throws them in the trash. That causes Marisa and Judy to play with the dolls together. Absent: Kadeem Hardison as Craig Cooper
| 41 | 14 | "Tightrope of Doom" | Robbie Countryman | Rob Lotterstein | August 7, 2016 | 219–220 | 1.88 |
Guest stars: Leslie Jordan as Cecil B. DeVille, James DiGiacomo as Petey, Jason Karasev as Laszlo, Jeremy Howard as Bob McCoy, Tati Gabrielle as Jackie, Daniel Browing Smith as Jeff
| 42 | 15 | "The Legend of Bad, Bad Cleo Brown" | Nzingha Stewart | Raynelle Swilling & Teri Schaffer | August 14, 2016 | 221 | 1.97 |
Guest stars: Roz Ryan as Grandma Gayle, Tom Wilson as Agent Whitman Absent: Trinitee Stokes as Judy Cooper, Kadeem Hardison as Craig Cooper
| 43 | 16 | "Spy of the Year Awards" | Robbie Countryman | Eddie Quintana | September 11, 2016 | 218 | 1.31 |
Kira is excited to be nominated for an Orgi Award—given to spies by the Organization—for the first time in her career. She is upset to learn that K.C. has also been nominated for the same award. K.C. becomes sick with food poisoning and must stay home while her family attends the awards ceremony. Tolentinó, the son of an imprisoned criminal who was captured by one of the Organization's spies, takes over the ceremony with help from his henchmen. Tolentinó disables everyone's electronic devices and intends to interrogate each spy until he locates the one who captured his father. Judy, who is still functional, sends a message to K.C. for help. K.C. recovers from her illness and has Marisa stay in an undercover van so she can guide her through the building using schematics. K.C. finds the ceremony room and rescues the audience. After Tolentinó is captured, the awards ceremony resumes, and Kira wins the nomination. Guest stars: John O'Hurley as Buck Marshall, Adam Irigoyen as Tolentinó
| 44 | 17 | "In Too Deep" | Rosario Roveto, Jr. | Darin Henry | September 18, 2016 | 214 | 1.11 |
K.C. and Ernie are assigned to go undercover and join a suspicious group of environmental activists known as the Volunteens so they can learn more about them and their leader, a young woman named Keller. K.C. and Ernie's cover is blown immediately as Keller knows they were sent to investigate her, which she allows them to do to prove that she has nothing to hide. Ernie becomes concerned that K.C. has been brainwashed into following the group's beliefs, after she begins agreeing with Keller. Meanwhile, Craig is assigned to protect Rollin, the ambassador to Monrovia, who is also an old friend. Craig prepares several large food dishes for Rollin, but is disappointed to learn that he no longer consumes fattening meals. Rollin convinces Craig to join him at a gym, but after Craig begins using a stair climber, Kira and Judy inform him that the machine has been implanted with a bomb that will detonate if he slows down. Judy eventually disarms the bomb, which was meant for Rollin. When Ernie tells his family about his concern for K.C., Craig tries unsuccessfully to convince him that she is simply maintaining her cover as one of Keller's followers. Guest stars: Rick Hall as Agent Johnson, Alice Lee as Keller, Rafael Petardi as Rollin, Myko Olivier as Reese
| 45 | 18 | "In Too Deep, Part 2" | Stephen Engel | Jenn Lloud & Kevin Bonani | September 25, 2016 | 215 | 1.17 |
Keller assigns K.C. to kidnap Monrovian ambassador Rollin. K.C., while wearing a mask, knocks her father unconscious and kidnaps Rollin. K.C. is surprised to learn that Rollin and Keller, after having a discussion, have decided to work together in a plot to become rich. K.C. reveals that she only kidnapped Rollin to maintain her cover as a new member of the Volunteens. When Ernie arrives, he accidentally foils K.C.'s attempt to stop Keller. K.C. and Ernie are tied up in a room with a smoke bomb while Rollin and Keller escape. Craig rescues K.C. and Ernie, and K.C. travels to an auction to stop Keller before she can bid on and obtain the Monrovian queen's diamond ring. Guest stars: Rick Hall as Agent Johnson, Alice Lee as Keller, Rafael Petardi as Rollin Absent: Trinitee Stokes as Judy Cooper, Tammy Townsend as Kira Cooper
| 46 | 19 | "Virtual Insanity" | Chris Poulos | Darin Henry | October 2, 2016 | 223 | 1.43 |
Ernie is kidnapped while he is in a virtual reality program. His kidnappers, Damon and Darci, plan to trick Ernie's virtual self into revealing a secret code that they need. K.C. enters the virtual world, despite the fact that she will experience virtual disorientation, in which the user is briefly unable to recall details about their real life. K.C.'s mission is to stop Ernie from revealing the code and to learn where his kidnappers have taken his physical body. In the virtual world, Ernie is popular at school while K.C. enjoys make-up and dislikes studying, unlike their real-life personalities. Damon and Darci have programmed a virtual version of Mrs. Goldfeder and Marisa to trick Ernie into revealing the code. K.C. eventually remembers her mission and real personality, and learns that Ernie was taken to a storage unit, which Damon and Darci are using as their headquarters. Ernie is rescued, and Damon and Darci are arrested. Afterward, K.C. uses the virtual reality machine to fantasize about herself spending time on a beach with Brett Willis. Guest stars: Ross Butler as Brett Willis, Jaime Moyer as Mrs. Goldfeder, David Hull as Damon, Natalie Lander as Darci Absent: Trinitee Stokes as Judy Cooper
| 47 | 20 | "Undercover Mother" | Joely Fisher | Cat Davis | November 6, 2016 | 222 | 1.36 |
Scholastic Accomplishments Quarterly chooses K.C. to be interviewed for their latest issue, as she is the smartest student at her school and in the Washington D.C. area. Ernie warns K.C. not to do the interview, as a precaution to protect her identity as a spy. K.C. disregards Ernie's warning and meets with the magazine author, C.W. Barnes, who plans to follow her around for two days so he can write a detailed article about her life, making it a larger story than what she initially expected. C.W. also requests to meet her parents, who are out of town; K.C. tells him that her father is an astronaut who is currently in space, and that her mother has a fear of leaving their house. C.W. then visits the Cooper residence, where K.C. disguises herself as her mother, Kira. To help K.C., Marisa unexpectedly arrives at the house disguised as K.C.'s mother, unaware that K.C. is already portraying Kira. Marisa then claims to be K.C.'s other mother, before K.C. eventually zaps him unconscious with an electrical device. After Ernie and Marisa convince K.C. that she does not have to be the best at everything, she has C.W. write instead about Alexis, the second-smartest student at her school. Guest star: Noah Weisberg as C.W. Barnes Absent: Trinitee Stokes as Judy Cooper, Tammy Townsend as Kira Cooper, Kadeem Hardison as Craig Cooper
| 48 | 21 | "Trust No One" | Robbie Countryman | Kurt Maloney | November 13, 2016 | 217 | 1.26 |
Because of the unexpected presence of enemies, K.C. is forced to abort a mission that only she and a few others knew about, which leads Agent Johnson to believe that there is a mole in the Organization who leaked out information about the mission. Johnson assigns K.C. to find the mole, and she decides to get advice from Zane to help her figure out who it could be. K.C. must memorize a code that allows her to access Zane's secure cell at the Organization, as Johnson believes that it is too risky to write it down and leave a paper trail. Zane's advice leads K.C. to suspect that either Marisa or one of her own family members may have leaked the information, but she eventually learns that she sleep-talks about her missions and that her room was bugged with a listening device. K.C. later discovers that Zane has escaped after someone overheard her mentioning the code in her sleep and used it to break him out. Meanwhile, Ernie donates some of Craig's coats to a school charity sale, but later discovers that one of the coats was a $2 million spy jacket created by the Organization for missions. Ernie eventually tracks down the man who purchased the jacket and takes it from him while he is distracted listening to headphones. Guest stars: Rick Hall as Agent Johnson, Francois Chau as Zane Absent: Trinitee Stokes as Judy Cooper
| 49 | 22 | "Holly Holly Not So Jolly" | Rosario Roveto, Jr. | Rob Lotterstein | December 4, 2016 | 224 | 1.04 |
At the Cooper house, Marisa and the family are busy decorating a Christmas tree, which K.C. usually enjoys doing. However, K.C. tells them that she needs to do some last-minute shopping for Christmas presents. Instead, K.C. actually visits the Organization's therapist, Dr. Levinstein, as she is having anxiety over her job as a spy. Through clips from previous episodes, K.C. reminisces with Dr. Levinstein about her various past missions, including those in which she had to disguise herself as someone else. K.C. also remembers missions in which she and her family worked together as a team. When Dr. Levinstein suggests that K.C. quit her job, she realizes how much she enjoys being a spy and working with her family. K.C. returns home to spend time with her family and Marisa. Guest star: Joel Brooks as Dr. Levinstein Absent: Trinitee Stokes as Judy Cooper
| 50 | 23 | "Collision Course" | Joel Zwick | Jenn Lloyd & Kevin Bonani | January 6, 2017 | 225 | 1.30 |
When K.C. believes that she spotted Abby while driving in traffic, her family thinks that she is delusional and feeling guilty about killing her. However, Abby and her mother Erica are still alive and are planning to kidnap David Simmons, who created the security systems for the U.S. Treasury. They intend to gain knowledge from Simmons on how to break through the systems so they can steal money from the Treasury. When the Organization learns about The Other Side's plan to kidnap Simmons, the Coopers are sent on a mission to locate him and keep him safe. Simmons had retired to live a life of seclusion, but Ernie discovers that he owns a biker club in West Virginia. K.C. enters the club as a biker, while her family is undercover as lost tourists. While searching the club for Simmons, K.C. spots Abby, who is also looking for him. After a motorcycle chase, K.C. runs Abby off the road and apprehends her. Special guest star: Jasmine Guy as Erica King Guest stars: Rick Fox as Richard Martin, Kara Royster as Abby Martin, Joel Brooks as Dr. Levinstein
| 51 | 24 | "Family Feud" | Jon Rosenbaum | Rob Lotterstein | January 13, 2017 | 226 | 1.18 |
After Abby is captured by the Organization, Richard and Erica kidnap K.C.'s family. Agent Johnson declines K.C.'s request to release Abby in exchange for her family members, stating that the Organization does not negotiate with criminals. K.C. breaks Abby out of prison and brings her to Richard and Erica, who tie up K.C. along with the rest of her family. Marisa realizes that K.C. needs help and figures out the location of Richard and Erica's hideout. When Marisa arrives, Craig and Kira are surprised to learn that she knows about their spy profession. Marisa unties the Coopers so they can fight Richard, Erica and Abby, who are then captured and brought to the Organization. Despite breaking Abby out of prison, Agent Johnson allows K.C. to avoid prison time because she brought them Richard, the leader of The Other Side. While camping in a forest, Zane receives a phone call informing him that The Other Side's leader has been captured. Special guest star: Jasmine Guy as Erica King Guest stars: Rick Fox as Richard Martin, Kara Royster as Abby Martin, Francois Chau as Zane, Rick Hall as Agent Johnson

=== Season 3 (2017–18) ===
| No. overall | No. in season | Title | Directed by | Written by | Original release date | Prod. code | U.S. viewers (millions) |
|---|---|---|---|---|---|---|---|
| 52 | 1 | "Coopers on the Run" | Rosario Roveto, Jr. and Robbie Countryman | Rob Lotterstein | July 7, 2017 | 301–302 | 1.24 |
K.C., Marisa and the rest of the Coopers flee to a safe house in Rio de Janeiro after Zane and his men target them. After two weeks in the safe house—a run-down apartment—K.C., Ernie and Marisa go into the city to contact the Organization. While in the city, Ernie meets Zoe, a young woman from Kansas who likes him. However, K.C. is suspicious of Zoe and ends their conversation as the Coopers are not to speak to anyone because of the possibility that Zane could be tracking them. K.C. contacts the Organization and learns that Zane is unaware of their whereabouts. K.C. then signs up the family for a mission to capture Passaro Grande, a local smuggler of exotic birds. After capturing Grande, Craig, Kira and Judy take him to the local authorities while K.C., Ernie and Marisa return to the safe house. A strong enemy agent named Sheena, who frequently talks to herself, breaks into the safe house and reveals that she was sent by Zane to kill them. After fighting K.C. and Ernie, Zoe breaks in and knocks out Sheena. Zoe reveals that she is an agent for the Organization who was assigned to protect the family. The group gets into a vehicle to head to a safe location, but K.C. must take a detour through the jungle after learning that Sheena is following them. The next day, Sheena locates the group and incapacitates Ernie, Marisa and Zoe with a small device that electrocutes them. K.C. and Sheena prepare to battle. Special guest star: China Anne McClain as Sheena Guest stars: Francois Chau as Zane, Haley Tju as Zoe
| 53 | 2 | "Welcome to the Jungle" | Robbie Countryman | Rob Lotterstein | July 14, 2017 | 303 | 1.06 |
During battle, K.C. tosses a Brazilian jumping spider on Sheena to paralyze her. Ernie, Marisa and Zoe regain consciousness and discover that K.C. has also been paralyzed by the spider. They leave Sheena behind and carry K.C. through the jungle. Zoe eventually makes an antidote for K.C. out of jungle vegetation and snake saliva. Meanwhile, Marisa is upset that today is school picture day and she is not there to have her picture taken. Marisa wanted a yearbook picture to remember the fact that she became a high school senior despite her poor grades. After wandering through the jungle, Craig, Kira and Judy find Sheena, who claims to be Zoe. They then find K.C. and the others. K.C. and Zoe apprehend Sheena, and Marisa and the Coopers later board a helicopter. During the flight, Zane reveals himself to be the pilot. Zane destroys the helicopter controls and parachutes out while the helicopter spirals out of control toward the ocean. Special guest star: China Anne McClain as Sheena Guest stars: Francois Chau as Zane, Haley Tju as Zoe
| 54 | 3 | "Out of the Water and into the Fire" | Robbie Countryman | Rob Lotterstein | July 14, 2017 | 304 | 1.20 |
K.C. manages to land the helicopter safely in the ocean, and Marisa and the Coopers are rescued by a nearby military ship. The captain apprehends them after discovering that Judy is a robot, as he does not believe that the Coopers are spies and he has never heard of the Organization. Marisa and the Coopers escape from their cell after using Judy's skeleton key. The Coopers return to Organization headquarters, where they discover a memorial service being held for them. The Coopers decide to keep their survival a secret to increase their chances of capturing Zane; they recruit Kira's parents, Othello and Gayle, so they can work together. Disguising her voice as Brett, Judy arranges to meet Zane at a laser tag facility, where K.C. and her family ambush him. After battling with real laser guns, Zane is apprehended, and K.C. declares that they no longer have to worry about The Other Side, unaware that a new enemy Organization known as The Alternate has been formed. Guest stars: Sherri Shepherd as Beverly, Roz Ryan as Grandma Gayle, Charlie Robinson as Pops, Francois Chau as Zane, Rick Hall as Agent Johnson, James McCauley as Captain
| 55 | 4 | "Web of Lies" | Robbie Countryman | Darin Henry | July 28, 2017 | 305 | 1.48 |
K.C. is upset to learn that she has received the same SAT score as Marisa: 1060. K.C. later learns that Beverly had Craig change her SAT result because she received a perfect score. Less than one percent of the population receives a perfect score; leaving the original score intact would draw unnecessary attention to K.C., putting her spy career at risk. K.C. disagrees with Beverly's decision as it will prevent her from being accepted into certain colleges. Beverly tells K.C. that the Organization wants her to remain a spy rather than go to college. K.C. drives to New York to retake her SAT test, while Ernie and Zoe team up for a mission to stop smugglers who are working in a party supplies warehouse. After completing the mission, Ernie asks Zoe to be his girlfriend, but she tells him that she has been assigned to a four-year mission in Antarctica. Ernie agrees to wait for Zoe until she concludes her mission. Meanwhile, Marisa wants K.C. to talk to the Organization about letting her become a spy. Marisa is insulted when K.C. tells her that she is not intelligent enough to be a spy. K.C. later tells Marisa that it would be better if she attended college rather than become a spy. Marisa, who does not want to attend college, becomes further upset at K.C. and decides to temporarily end their friendship. Two months later, K.C. learns that she has received a perfect SAT score. Guest stars: Sherri Shepherd as Beverly, Haley Tju as Zoe
| 56 | 5 | "Teen Drama" | Robbie Countryman | David Tolentino | August 4, 2017 | 306 | 1.02 |
Marisa, who is still upset at K.C. for not allowing her to join the Organization, befriends a student named Brady, who says that he is part of the Organization. Brady tells Marisa that the Organization has been impressed with her for a while as she helped to capture the leader of The Other Side. Brady recruits Marisa as a spy for the Organization. Meanwhile, K.C. misses spending time with Marisa. Ernie invites his fellow Model UN member, Monique, to the Cooper house to spend time with her, but he becomes upset at K.C. for befriending Monique and disrupting his plan to be with her. K.C. realizes that spending time with Monique is not the same as being with Marisa. Brady assigns Marisa to befriend K.C., who he says could be providing intelligence to The Other Side. Marisa befriends K.C. again so she can learn whether she is working with The Other Side. Guest stars: Connor Weil as Brady, Chandler Kinney as Monique Absent: Kadeem Hardison as Craig Cooper
| 57 | 6 | "K.C. Under Construction" | Eileen Conn | Jenn Lloyd & Kevin Bonani | August 11, 2017 | 307 | 1.18 |
K.C. is assigned to go undercover as a construction worker at a tall unfinished building, allowing her to spy on a nearby tower where a group of renegade spies are believed to be meeting so they can discuss weapons. K.C.'s male co-workers at the construction site mock her for being a female. K.C. meets a female construction worker, Crystal, who tells K.C. that the men will eventually ignore her. K.C. later learns that the renegade spy group is working on sonic brain imploders, capable of melting people's brains. When Brady has Marisa gain knowledge about K.C.'s current mission, he warns his group that K.C. is spying on them and that she must be killed. A man is sent to the construction site to plant a brain imploder device. After a fight, K.C. takes down the man, but he says he does not know how to diffuse the imploder. Crystal has K.C. put the imploder into cement mix, which prevents it from detonating. Meanwhile, Judy gets in trouble at school after using mature logic to question a student's belief in the tooth fairy. Ernie is tasked with teaching Judy to behave like a normal child, to help maintain her cover as a spy robot. Guest stars: Rick Hall as Agent Johnson, Connor Weil as Brady, Lex Medlin as Roy, Eris Baker as Diane, Tara Karsian as Crystal, Larry Poindexter as Foreman Absent: Tammy Townsend as Kira Cooper, Kadeem Hardison as Craig Cooper
| 58 | 7 | "The Storm Maker" | Robbie Countryman | Jenn Lloyd & Kevin Bonani | August 18, 2017 | 308 | 1.30 |
Ernie and Marisa mock K.C., believing that she does not have a date for their final high school homecoming. On the night of the homecoming, K.C. goes on a mission to retrieve a weather-altering device known as the Storm Maker, which the remaining members of The Other Side plan to use to create man-made weather disasters. K.C. retrieves the device and hides it in her school locker, where she plans to keep it while she attends the homecoming. K.C. has Howard, a gadget inventor for the Organization, pose as her date at homecoming, telling him that it is actually practice so he can become a field agent. Marisa attends homecoming with Brady, while Ernie goes with Monique. Brady learns about the Storm Maker through Marisa after having her casually question K.C. about her latest mission. Brady, who is working for The Alternate, steals the device and places it in his locker, then deletes security footage of his theft before K.C. and Ernie can learn who took the device. Meanwhile, Craig and Judy attend a father-daughter dance at her school. Guest stars: Rick Hall as Agent Johnson, Connor Weil as Brady, Matthew Gold as Howard, Chandler Kinney as Monique Absent: Tammy Townsend as Kira Cooper
| 59 | 8 | "Keep on Truckin' " | Jon Rosenbaum | Darin Henry | August 25, 2017 | 309 | 1.20 |
K.C. and Craig discover that the Storm Maker device cannot be powered without a rare chemical known as Dilithium. They go undercover as workers at a truck stop restaurant so they can obtain the Dilithium from a truck that is delivering it. Meanwhile, Ernie gives Judy an emotion upgrade to increase her mental sensitivity, to help her maintain her cover as a real child. At school, Ernie overhears Brady during a phone conversation and discovers that he is an enemy agent. Brady uses memory spray to erase Ernie's recent memory. Marisa visits the house to ask Ernie questions regarding K.C.'s latest mission. Ernie then overhears Marisa talking to Brady on a cellular phone, and learns that she is a spy. Marisa erases his recent memories with memory spray. At the truck stop, the driver of the Dilithium truck walks inside for lunch, allowing K.C. to obtain the chemicals. Brady, wearing a ski mask, takes the Dilithium and hijacks the truck. K.C. attempts to take control of the truck, and scratches part of Brady's face through the mask opening, before falling off the truck. Later, K.C. meets Marisa and Brady at a restaurant, and notices the scratch marks on his face. Although he says the marks came from a cat, K.C. realizes that Brady was the truck hijacker. Guest stars: Rick Hall as Agent Johnson, James DiGiacomo as Petey, Connor Weil as Brady Absent: Tammy Townsend as Kira Cooper
| 60 | 9 | "Unmasking the Enemy" | Jon Rosenbaum | Rob Lotterstein | November 3, 2017 | 310 | 1.37 |
K.C. suspects that Brady has been spying on her through a necklace that he gave Marisa, who is unaware of Brady's Storm Maker theft. K.C. believes the necklace is bugged, so she creates a plan to trick and catch Brady. K.C. tells Marisa, who is wearing the necklace, that the Organization has created a device called the Rain Coat, capable of stopping the Storm Maker. K.C. also says that she will be dropping off the plans for the device—which is actually fictitious— in an alley later that night, with the hope that Brady will arrive there to steal them. A masked man from The Alternate arrives to intercept the plans, but he is knocked out by K.C., who realizes that the man is not Brady. Three additional masked men arrive, including Brady, but they are forced away when Marisa arrives and threatens them with a laser gun. Meanwhile, Kira is about to enjoy a day off when Lori, an agent of the Organization, drops off her baby at the Coopers' house so she can go on a last-minute mission. Kira then puts Judy in charge of watching the baby, claiming that she has to go on a last-minute mission. Kira actually gets a massage and has her nails done, while Judy is unable to stop the baby from crying. Guest stars: Connor Weil as Brady, Ego Nwodim as Agent McKenzie
| 61 | 10 | "The Truth Will Set You Free" | Jon Rosenbaum | Eileen Conn | November 10, 2017 | 311 | 1.34 |
Agent Johnson puts the Coopers in charge of collecting information on Brady. K.C. arranges a job interview for Marisa to become a junior agent-in-training for the Organization, which leads Marisa to question Brady, who had already told her that she was a junior agent. After being questioned, Brady eventually reveals to Marisa that he is a member of The Alternate. Brady also reveals that he has hours of audio footage in which Marisa states that K.C. may have become a rogue agent and agrees to work with him to take her down. Brady blackmails Marisa to continue spying on K.C., or else he will release the audio footage and get her imprisoned for treason against the United States. Marisa confesses to K.C. that she has been spying for Brady, and K.C. discovers that Marisa's necklace was never bugged. When unusual weather begins occurring around the world, the Coopers realize that the Storm Maker has been activated, so they instruct Marisa to gain information from Brady about the device. When Marisa fails, K.C. goes in disguise as Marisa and confronts Brady, who kidnaps and takes her to The Alternate's headquarters, as she planned. Meanwhile, Ernie wants to drive by Monique's house in his father's 1969 classic muscle car, but he crashes it before getting out of the driveway, scraping away the paint on one of the doors. Judy makes the situation worse by repainting the door a different color and then removing the paint entirely. Ernie and Judy blame the damage on The Alternate, but Craig does not believe them. Guest stars: Rick Hall as Agent Johnson, Connor Weil as Brady, Riley Litman as Reid
| 62 | 11 | "Stormy Weather" | Jon Rosenbaum | Darin Henry | November 17, 2017 | 312 | 1.38 |
At The Alternate's headquarters, K.C. comes out of disguise and escapes from a room where she had been locked up. K.C. frees an imprisoned scientist named Gwen, who leads her through the building in search of the Storm Maker, but Gwen later reveals she is part of The Alternate. Brady, Gwen, and Alternate member Reid plan to use the Storm Maker to have a massive storm hit the Capitol Building during the State of the Union address. Craig and Kira drive to the Capitol to warn people, but they encounter heavy rain and hail. Marisa enters The Alternate's headquarters to help K.C., and they rush to the rooftop to destroy the Storm Maker's transmitter. After a brawl with Brady, K.C. destroys the transmitter with a laser gun. Brady escapes by parachuting off the rooftop, and Marisa decides that she does not want to interview to become a spy because of the hard work required by the job. Guest stars: Rick Hall as Agent Johnson, Connor Weil as Brady, Riley Litman as Reid, Christine Rodriguez as Gwen Absent: Trinitee Stokes as Judy Cooper
| 63 | 12 | "Deleted!" | Kadeem Hardison | Jenn Lloyd & Kevin Bonani | November 24, 2017 | 315 | 1.09 |
Judy's memory is almost full, which requires her to visit the Organization to have her video footage downloaded. The Coopers realize that Judy has recorded everything they have done, including things that could get them excluded from the Organization again. The family decides to delete Judy's incriminating videos, including footage showing that Marisa knows about the family being spies. After reminiscing through old footage, Craig deletes several videos, including important footage from their recent circus mission. When the family discovers that the circus footage cannot be recovered, they worry about how Agent Johnson will react to them tampering with evidence. Ernie suggests reenacting the circus mission in their house and filming it to cover for the deletion of the real footage, which leads the family to reminisce through old videos about his previous bad ideas. The family also watches other old videos, until Agent Johnson arrives at the house to pick up Judy. The family hides Judy and convinces Johnson that she has already left to visit the Organization for the memory download. Afterwards, Judy expresses sorrow that her videos will need to be downloaded and removed, as they serve as her memories. Ernie devises a solution to back up Judy's video footage to a separate hard drive so they can be reinstalled onto Judy after she downloads them for the Organization. Guest star: Rick Hall as Agent Johnson
| 64 | 13 | "Second Chances" | Jon Rosenbaum | Teleplay by : Rob Lotterstein; Story by : Zendaya and Rob Lotterstein | January 15, 2018 | 313 | 1.09 |
After a dangerous mission in which she thought she was going to die, K.C. realizes that she still has feelings for Darien, and Marisa encourages her to tell him how she feels. K.C. wants to hang out with Darien but he tells her that he has a new girlfriend named Bianca and K.C. lies and says that she has a boyfriend and the two agree to go on a double date with each other. K.C. has to find a guy to assist her on the date so she asks Howard to pose as Trey Appleton Jr. and the date becomes awkward. K.C. learns that Bianca is actually nice so K.C. and Marisa plan to set Bianca up with Ernie. K.C. gives Ernie a bottle of confidence serum. Meanwhile, Petey wants Judy to be his assistant in his magic act, which she reluctantly agrees to after being forced by Kira. However, Petey says that her bad attitude will ruin his chance of winning so he decides to get a new assistant, which makes Judy jealous. The next day, Judy wants to be Petey's assistant again and the new one is afraid of being sawed in half. At the Olive Pit, K.C. learns that Bianca is cheating on Darien with Howard and she goes to tell him, but Darien tells K.C. that Bianca is his cousin. Darien tells K.C. that he lied to her because he was afraid of being hurt by K.C. again. K.C. wants to fix things between the two of them, but Darien wants to be able to take things slow so him and K.C. agree to be just friends. Guest stars: James DiGiacomo as Petey, Chris Tavarez as Darien, Matthew Gold as Howard Absent: Kadeem Hardison as Craig Cooper
| 65 | 14 | "Revenge of the Van People" | Jon Rosenbaum | Shawnte McCall | January 16, 2018 | 314 | 0.87 |
Agent Johnson sends K.C. to Switzerland so she can attend an international conference for young espionage agents. Meanwhile, Johnson puts Ernie in charge of training a trio of agents named Jin, Lecia, and Amelie, with assistance from Howard. Ernie is disappointed to learn that the trio are "van people," the term used for agents who operate from within a van. Ernie is jealous of K.C. and upset because he believes that the Organization does not have faith in him. Johnson informs the five agents of a website, Buzziebuzz, that is using clickbait quizzes to create psychological profiles on young people. Johnson instructs the agents to observe the website's headquarters from within a van and then report their findings. The agents discover that Brady is inside the headquarters, and that the website is a front for The Alternate, which is planning to brainwash the site's teenaged web visitors. Ernie decides that the team will go against Johnson's initial orders and apprehend Brady. Jin, Lecia, and Amelie are unsure of their ability to complete such a mission, but Ernie inspires confidence in them. In disguise, Ernie, Howard and Lecia infiltrate the headquarters, while Jin and Amelie monitor the mission from the van. Jin, an architectural engineer, guides them through the building with a schematic. Upon locating the mainframe room, Lecia hacks into the computer system, allowing Amelie to remotely install a virus to corrupt the website. The team then captures Brady. Johnson becomes upset at Ernie and tells him that Brady had been working undercover after being convinced by the Organization to work as a double agent. Guest stars: Rick Hall as Agent Johnson, Connor Weil as Brady, Matthew Gold as Howard, Lori Mae Hernandez as Lecia, Ethan Lee as Jin, Tiara McKinney as Amelie Absent: Veronica Dunne as Marisa Clark, Trinitee Stokes as Judy Cooper, Tammy Townsend as Kira Cooper, Kadeem Hardison as Craig Cooper
| 66 | 15 | "The Gammy Files" | Eileen Conn | Rob Lotterstein | January 17, 2018 | 319 | 0.94 |
Craig's father, Earl, visits the family and brings along his new girlfriend, Betty. Craig is pleasantly surprised to see how cheerful his father is towards him now that he has a girlfriend. K.C. becomes suspicious of Betty, believing that she may actually be Margaret Turner, a woman who stole important documents from the Organization in 1977, compromising agents around the world, before disappearing from a hotel. Craig is reluctant to believe K.C.'s theory because he does not want to disrupt his father's new relationship, fearing that such an action would result in Earl returning to his critical behavior. In a storage facility for information related to cold cases, K.C., Ernie and Judy retrieve Margaret's old hairbrush, which had been left behind at the hotel. After obtaining a sample of Betty's DNA and comparing it with the hair on Margaret's brush, K.C. learns that there is a 99-percent match between the two. However, she learns that Betty has a twin sister named Midge, an alternate name for Margaret. K.C. and Judy travel to Margaret's hideaway on a remote island off of Puget Sound, where they apprehend her. In the meantime, K.C. is upset that no boys have asked her out for the upcoming prom, while multiple boys have asked out Marisa. To cheer K.C. up, Marisa eventually asks her out to the prom, which K.C. accepts. Guest stars: George Wallace as Pappa Earl, Jackée Harry as Betty / Midge
| 67 | 16 | "Take Me Out" | Joel Zwick | Kurt Maloney | January 18, 2018 | 316 | 0.91 |
K.C. and Darien decide to go on a date to a baseball game, where they are featured on the stadium's kiss cam. However, they have an awkward kiss because Darien was unaware that K.C. had a nacho chip in her mouth. Afterwards, K.C. goes to the stadium bathroom, where Regina Honey captures her. Honey reveals that when she saw K.C. on the kiss cam, she decided to capture her as revenge after K.C. got her put in prison for two years. At Honey's apartment, while K.C. is handcuffed, Honey reveals that she did not plan ahead on what to do next with K.C. When K.C. mentions how she is upset about disrupting her relationship with Darien again, Honey becomes interested and asks K.C. what she means. K.C. tells her how she previously had to end her relationship with Darien because of spy work, which causes Honey to reminisce about a boyfriend named Joey Damico, who she dated while they were teenagers. The relationship ended after Honey became a criminal, which Joey disliked. Honey, upset about her old relationship, decides to let K.C. go so she can be with Darien, but she is too late as the baseball game is over. Later, Darien believes that he made K.C. uncomfortable by trying to kiss her at the game, and the two decide to just be friends. K.C. then gives Damico the address to Honey's apartment, where they reunite. Meanwhile, Ernie helps Judy improve her creative writing after she receives an "F" in school. To help her, they act out various improv scenes. Guest stars: Chris Tavarez as Darien, Diane Delano as Honey, John D'Aquino as Joey Damico
| 68 | 17 | "Twin It to Win It" | Joel Zwick | LaTonya Croff | January 22, 2018 | 317 | 0.91 |
After visiting the Lincoln Memorial, K.C. and a boy named Byron agree to go on a date the following night. Afterwards, K.C. is briefed about a man named Henry Parker who donated $5 million to American University, which is renaming its library in his honor. Parker has been receiving threats, so K.C. is to go undercover as the solo drum player in the renaming ceremony honoring Parker, allowing her to be close enough to protect him. K.C. is given a special pair of drum sticks that allow her to play the drums like an expert. The next day at the university, K.C. competes with another drummer, Elliot, for the solo drummer position, which she wins by demonstrating her drumming skills. Before the renaming ceremony, K.C. meets Barney Feffer, a university security guard who is initially suspicious of her because there is no record of Cassandra Bailey, the alias that she is using for the mission. K.C. convinces Barney that she is an undercover police officer. K.C., unaware that Byron is attending the ceremony, tells him that she is cancelling their date to be with her sick grandmother, using the excuse to complete her mission. During the ceremony, K.C. apprehends Barney after realizing he is the culprit who wants to harm Parker. Barney explains that he and Parker were roommates at the university 35 years earlier, and he wants revenge on Parker for taking the top bunk bed in their dormitory. Byron then encounters K.C. at the university and questions why she is not with her grandmother. Meanwhile, Ernie helps Marisa write a college essay for the Fashion Institute of Technology. Afterwards, they share several unexpected kisses despite not having romantic feelings for each other. Marisa agrees with Ernie's theory that she was overly passionate about the school and that her passion led to the kisses. Guest stars: French Stewart as Barney, Brandon Black as Byron, Tajh Bellow as Elliot, Alexander Neher as Captain Absent: Trinitee Stokes as Judy Cooper, Tammy Townsend as Kira Cooper
| 69 | 18 | "Cassandra Undercover" | Joel Zwick | David Tolentino | January 23, 2018 | 318 | 0.90 |
At the university, K.C. tells Byron that she is actually K.C.'s identical cousin, Cassandra. Byron does not believe K.C. and decides to visit her house. K.C. runs home to change into a different outfit and pose as herself ahead of Byron's arrival. Byron still does not believe that K.C. has an identical cousin, so she agrees to have dinner with him and Cassandra on the following night to prove it. Marisa inadvertently helps K.C. remember that Bernice, who is currently a prisoner at the Organization's headquarters, has an identical appearance to K.C. Bernice, now temporarily released from prison, agrees to pose as Cassandra as long as K.C. promises her a new face through plastic surgery. At The Olive Pit restaurant, Bernice runs ahead of K.C. so she can meet Byron while posing as K.C., who is now forced to masquerade as Cassandra. Later in the meal, Bernice goes to the bathroom and, after a brawl with K.C., escapes through a window. K.C., still posing as Cassandra, tells Byron that K.C. had to leave, and he decides to end his relationship with her. K.C. has Marisa wear a disguise to pose as Bernice, to prevent the Organization from realizing that Bernice is gone. Meanwhile, Craig is tired of Ernie complaining about his lack of comfort on missions. Believing that Ernie is spoiled and needs to toughen up, Craig sends him to live in the backyard for a day. When Craig refuses Kira's demand to let Ernie come inside to eat, she forces Craig to stay outside with Ernie. Guest stars: Brandon Black as Byron, Noel Arthur as Guard Absent: Trinitee Stokes as Judy Cooper
| 70 | 19 | "K.C. Times Three" | Patrick Maloney | Dava Savel | January 24, 2018 | 320 | 0.90 |
K.C. learns that Bernice has been robbing convenience stores in Pennsylvania, and Kira insists that she bring Ernie and Judy as backup. By the time of their arrival, the trio learn that Bernice is now robbing convenience stores in New Jersey. When the trio arrive at their new destination, they learn that Bernice has identified herself to the public as K.C. Ernie and Judy enter the last known convenience store to have been robbed by Bernice, while K.C. waits in their SUV to avoid being arrested. Meanwhile, Marisa's mother, Lucy, becomes worried about her daughter's whereabouts, forcing Kira to disguise herself as Marisa. In New Jersey, K.C. leaves Ernie and Judy behind after learning of the highway on which Bernice is travelling. K.C. is arrested during her pursuit of Bernice, and Judy and Ernie learn that Bernice is heading to New York to get her plastic surgery, which she intends to pay for with the money robbed from the convenience stores. Ernie and Judy apprehend Bernice, who is sent back to prison, allowing Marisa to return home. Guest stars: Anita Barone as Lucy Miller, Lucas Hazlett as Store Clerk, Scot Zeller as Dr. Tuckfeld, Sonya Leslie as Doctor
| 71 | 20 | "The Domino Effect" | Eileen Conn | Darin Henry | January 29, 2018 | 321 | 0.88 |
The Organization learns that enemy agents are posing as ordinary people in the Washington, D.C. area, where a covert weapons distribution center is being operated and is distributing laser guns. The Organization hopes to locate the distribution center before The Alternate does. Meanwhile, Marisa is upset that she has not been nominated in the school yearbook for any senior superlatives, especially the most fashionable. Marisa begins wearing outlandish outfits to school to convince the students, including yearbook editor Amy Bishop, that she is the most fashionable student. The Coopers locate the weapons distribution center, operating from within a house in their neighborhood. They locate the man and woman who operate the distribution center and then knock them unconscious during a brawl that damages much of the living room. When Amy arrives at the house, the Coopers realize that the man and woman are her parents. Craig and Kira remain unsure if Amy is involved with her parents as an enemy spy, despite K.C.'s belief that she is not. Amy is memory sprayed so she will have no recollection of the Coopers being spies who knocked out her parents. The agents are unable to locate a distribution list, which would help the Organization eliminate enemy spy networks. The Coopers have the living room restored and the parents memory sprayed, then K.C. is sent to befriend Amy in hopes of locating the distribution list. K.C. is unsuccessful in befriending Amy, who already has a friend named Susie. Ernie and Marisa help create a fight between Amy and Susie, resulting in K.C. consoling Amy and beginning a friendship. Guest stars: Jonathan Silverman as Mitch Bishop, Kirsten Nelson as Danielle Bishop, Rick Hall as Agent Johnson, Kirrilee Berger as Amy Bishop, Ashley Tavares as Ms. Schaffer
| 72 | 21 | "Domino 2: Barbecued" | Joely Fisher | Rob Lotterstein | January 30, 2018 | 322 | 0.89 |
K.C. attends rigorous dance classes with Amy, and is surprised at how physically fit Amy is, leading her to suspect that she may be a spy. Later, K.C. becomes close friends with Amy, and Marisa becomes upset that K.C. has not been able to spend time with her lately. When Amy invites K.C. to her house, K.C. discovers a laptop that is protected by a password. The Coopers invite Amy and her parents, Mitch and Danielle, to their house for a barbecue, during which Ernie infiltrates the Bishops' house and attempts to learn what is on the laptop. At the barbecue, Amy tells K.C. how nervous she is about going to college soon, leading K.C. to believe that she is simply a regular teenager and not a spy. Kira starts a game between the two families to learn more about each other, with the Bishops unaware that Ernie is listening for possible clues that might unlock the laptop. Marisa, still upset at K.C., arrives at the barbecue uninvited and disrupts the game, which makes Amy's parents uncomfortable. They and Amy suddenly leave the barbecue and return home. Because of difficulty in contacting Ernie, he is unable to escape the house before the Bishops arrive. Guest stars: Jonathan Silverman as Mitch Bishop, Kirsten Nelson as Danielle Bishop, Kirrilee Berger as Amy Bishop
| 73 | 22 | "Domino 3: Buggin' Out" | Jon Rosenbaum | Jenn Lloyd & Kevin Bonani | January 31, 2018 | 323 | 1.00 |
K.C. creates a diversion that allows Ernie to escape the Bishops' house, while Kira learns through hidden cameras that Danielle put audio bugs in the Cooper house. Danielle and Mitch are also heard discussing their boss, an individual known as The Mask. The Coopers keep the audio bugs in place to avoid raising suspicion, and they have Judy use her vocal impersonation ability to pose as the family. Brady devises an idea for K.C. to enter the Bishops' house and switch their laptop with a duplicate that was developed by the Organization. Upon entering their password into the duplicate, the Bishops' files will become visible to the Organization, while the duplicate will mirror the original laptop and its contents to avoid suspicion. Ernie gains access to the Bishops' laptop, but is unable to locate the distribution list. Agent Johnson plans to have Amy's parents apprehended on the following morning and force them to reveal the list. K.C. wants to take Amy somewhere so she does not witness her parents being arrested, but Johnson rejects the idea because it could appear suspicious. Mitch and Danielle, concerned about the Coopers possibly being spies, want to leave the city, but their idea is rejected by Amy, who is revealed to be an enemy spy working with them. K.C. goes against Johnson and successfully invites Amy to accompany her and Marisa to New York City, where Marisa will be interviewed for acceptance into the Fashion Institute of Technology. Guest stars: Jonathan Silverman as Mitch Bishop, Kirsten Nelson as Danielle Bishop, Rick Hall as Agent Johnson, Connor Weil as Brady, Kirrilee Berger as Amy Bishop, Ashley Tavares as Ms. Schaffer
| 74 | 23 | "Domino 4: The Mask" | Jon Rosenbaum | Rob Lotterstein | February 1, 2018 | 324 | 1.01 |
Craig, Kira, Ernie, and Agent Johnson apprehend Mitch and Danielle, who reveal that Amy is 26 years old and is not their daughter but actually their boss, The Mask. Ernie and Brady are sent to retrieve Amy, who is at a fast-food restaurant with K.C. and Marisa. Ernie and Brady arrive at the restaurant and reveal that Amy is The Mask. Amy escapes after a brawl, which leaves Marisa covered in food. Brady drives Marisa to New York City for her college interview, while K.C. and Ernie track down Amy. Despite her dirty outfit, Marisa is accepted into the Fashion Institute of Technology, and after sharing the news with Brady, they realize they have romantic feelings for each other. Meanwhile, K.C. and Ernie have tracked down Amy to a lighthouse. Guest stars: Jonathan Silverman as Mitch Bishop, Kirsten Nelson as Danielle Bishop, Rick Hall as Agent Johnson, Connor Weil as Brady, Kirrilee Berger as Amy Bishop, Michelle Duffy as Jean Absent: Trinitee Stokes as Judy Cooper
| 75 | 24 | "K.C. Undercover: The Final Chapter" | Jon Rosenbaum | Rob Lotterstein | February 2, 2018 | 325–326 | 1.16 |
After a brawl, Amy is left dangling atop the lighthouse. She claims she is not The Mask and that it is someone closely associated with K.C. Before Amy can reveal The Mask's identity, she falls into the ocean and escapes, leaving behind a flash drive containing the weapons distribution list. At home, K.C. cannot decide whether she should remain a spy or attend Stanford University. When K.C. learns that Marisa and Brady are a couple, she declines to continue talking with Marisa about her missions, as K.C. does not trust Brady. Agent Johnson is informed of the list, and because of its sensitivity, he instructs that it not be shared with anyone, including Agent Beverly, who is the new head of the Organization. Marisa breaks up with Brady, believing he may not be trustworthy. With the weapons distribution list, the Coopers invite the specified crime bosses to a VIP party ahead of a basketball game. The criminals are then knocked out with gas and apprehended. Beverly declares an end to the spy war, but The Mask sends an anonymous message to the Organization, thanking K.C. for apprehending his competition, allowing him to take over their operations. Brady tells Marisa he will quit being a spy to be with her, but when he overhears that Johnson is The Mask and has reprogrammed Judy to eliminate the Coopers, he is injured by Johnson and sent to a hospital unconscious. Johnson frames Brady by telling the Coopers that he was The Mask. Ernie restores Judy after she tries to kill K.C., but she cannot recall who reprogrammed her. When Brady regains consciousness, Marisa learns that Johnson is The Mask, and he is apprehended after trying to kill Brady. However, Johnson is released by two agents working with him, and he disrupts K.C.'s graduation ceremony, where she is the valedictorian. After the Coopers knock out Johnson and his two agents, K.C. continues her speech and reveals her secret life as a spy. Afterwards, Judy memory sprays the audience, excluding Marisa and the Coopers. K.C. decides to simultaneously attend college and continue being a spy. Two months later, Marisa and Brady are a couple again, and she and K.C. depart for college. Guest stars: Sherri Shepherd as Beverly, Rick Hall as Agent Johnson, Connor Weil as Brady, Kirrilee Berger as Amy Bishop, Riley Litman as Reid Chase, Brandon Black as Byron
