= Alex Drake (Pretty Little Liars) =

Fictional character

- Pretty Little Liars character
- Alex Drake posing as her twin sister, Spencer Hastings
- First appearance: "Tick-Tock, Bitches" (Note: Alex's first appearance as A.D. took place in the episode "Of Late I Think of Rosewood". However, her first unmasked appearance portrayed by Troian Bellisario occurred in "Tick-Tock, Bitches".) (Season 7, episode 1)
- Last appearance: "Till Death Do Us Part" (Season 7, episode 20)
- Created by: I. Marlene King
- Portrayed by: Troian Bellisario

In-universe information
- Full name: Alexandra Drake
- Alias: Spencer Hastings (Note: Alex pretended to be Spencer, using her name and identity.)
- Nicknames: "A" (Note: The Liars, Mona, and Caleb have referred to her as an "A" in certain episodes.); A-moji (Note: Caleb Rivers comes up with this description for Alex due to communicating with emoticons through her text messages.); Big Bad (Note: The Liars use the term Big Bad to refer to Alex initially when not using "A" or the Stalker.) "Not A" (Note: Hanna refers to Alex as "Not A" after revealing that their tormentor doesn't go by any initials.); Uber A (Note: Series creator I. Marlene King referred to the character as "Uber A" as a smartest version of "A".); Waldo (Note: Caleb suggests "Waldo" as a nickname when discussing Alex's anonymity.)
- Occupation: Stalker; Bartender
- Affiliation: The A-Team (formerly)
- Residence: London, England (formerly); Rosewood, Pennsylvania (formerly); France (currently) (Note: In "Till Death Do Us Part", Alex and her mother Mary are kidnapped by Mona and trapped in a house in France. In the pilot episode of the spin-off series Pretty Little Liars: The Perfectionists, it is implied that the two escaped Mona's prison, leaving their fate unknown.)
- Family: Peter Hastings (father); Mary Drake (mother); Spencer Hastings (twin sister); Melissa Hastings (paternal half-sister); Jason DiLaurentis (paternal half-brother, maternal cousin); Charlotte Drake (maternal half-sister); Alison DiLaurentis (maternal cousin)
- Status: Unknown

Alexandra "Alex" Drake is a fictional character created by I. Marlene King and portrayed by Troian Bellisario in the American television series Pretty Little Liars. Officially introduced in the series finale, Alex Drake is both the identical twin of main character Spencer Hastings and the previously anonymous identity known as "A.D."

In childhood, Drake was adopted by a wealthy British family that later abandoned her, forcing Alex to bounce around foster homes and orphanages. Because of this, Alex would frequently impersonate Spencer in adulthood due to jealousy over her happier upbringing.

Alex Drake is considered the deadliest antagonist of the series. As "A.D.", she blackmailed, stalked and tortured the main characters in an attempt to discover Charlotte Drake's murderer.

The character's twin storyline pays tribute to Alison and Courtney DiLaurentis, characters of the Pretty Little Liars book series.

== Development ==
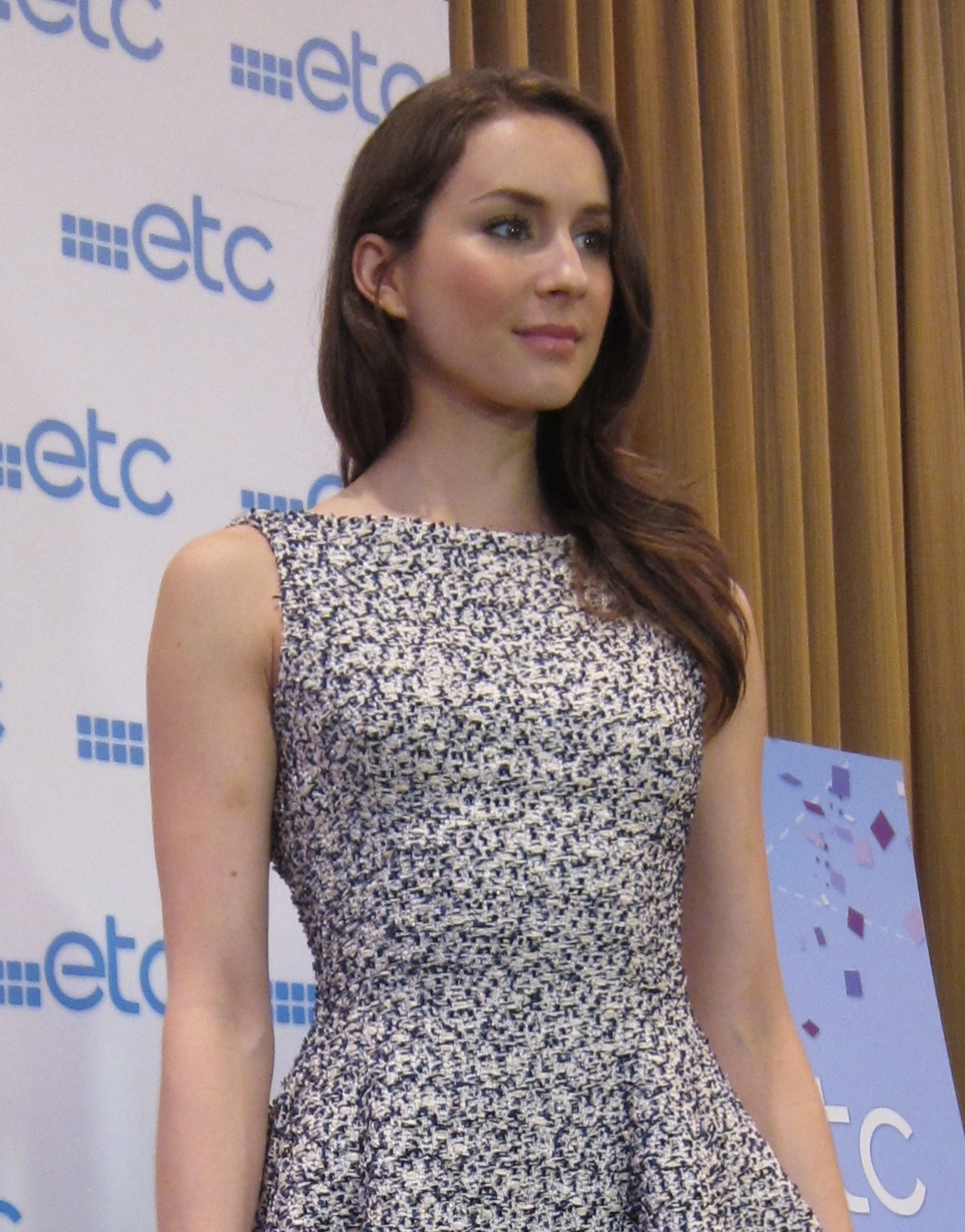
Troian Bellisario portrayed both Alex Drake and Spencer Hastings.

Bellisario was cast as Spencer Hastings, in November 2009. Alex is Spencer's identical twin sister, whose existence was unknown until the series' final episode. During an interview to Elle, Bellisario disclosed that Marlene King, the show's creator, was planning to introduce Spencer's twin since 2014, when the show's fifth season began airing. She also commented that King was initially doubtful towards the storyline since Freeform wasn't decided if the show was going further forward. However, by the end of the sixth season, Marlene warned Bellisario they were staying true to the plan, so they began working on the character's history and characteristics.

According to Bellisario, the difference between Alex and Spencer is that "Spencer approaches things with her head and her heart, and Alex approaches things with her head and her groin. That's not to say she doesn't have a heart or feelings, but she's gotten really good at putting a thick coat of armor over her heart." Referred to as the series' "ultimate villain", Alex is an "Essex girl" whose portrayal was influenced by late singer Sid Vicious. She is a manipulative woman who can easily disguise and pass herself off as Spencer. Alex is desperate to take over her twin sister's life since Spencer has a supportive cycle of friends and family, while Alex was twice abandoned and forced to live on her own terms.

== Storylines ==
=== Background ===
Alex is the third and last child born to Mary Drake after Mary posed as her twin sister Jessica DiLaurentis to sleep with Peter Hastings whom Jessica previously had an affair with.

Mary later gave birth to identical twins at Radley Sanitarium, a mental institution where she was frequently a patient. The oldest child, Spencer Hastings, was taken from Mary (much like her first born Charlotte) and placed in the care of Peter and his wife, Veronica. Alex was born minutes after Spencer, and her existence was unknown to Peter and Veronica. Mary, desperate to escape Radley, allowed Doctor Cochran to arrange Alex's adoption in exchange for $500,000 and a resignation from the psychiatric hospital.

Alex was later adopted by a wealthy British couple but eventually got stripped of her adoptive name and placed in an orphanage when she started to develop mental health problems. Drake bounced around foster homes and orphanages for a large portion of her childhood and, on her tenth birthday, ran away from the Ambrose Home for Wayward Children.

She later obtained a job bartending where she met Wren Kingston, Spencer Hastings' ex-boyfriend. After originally mistaking her for Spencer, Wren and Alex began a romantic relationship. After Wren told Alex about her blood relations to the Hastings and DiLaurentis families, Alex even met her half-sister Charlotte. The two grew extremely close, and after Charlotte was murdered, Alex took over her reign as "A" to find the culprit.

=== Season 6 ===
While never making an actual physical appearance, Alex Drake indirectly appears throughout the sixth season as "A.D." while wearing various disguises to stalk the Liars (Aria Montgomery, Spencer Hastings, Hanna Marin, Emily Fields and Alison DiLaurentis).

=== Season 7 ===
Alex makes her first appearance during the Season 7 premiere, "Tick-Tock, Bitches". After holding Hanna in captivity and torturing her, Alex poses as Spencer to have a conversation with Hanna with the latter assuming the talk to be a dream. Alex's second appearance comes in "Exes and OMGs" where she looks at a Hastings family photo album.

Alex makes three more appearances, all while pretending to be Spencer - In "The DArkest Knight", "Spencer" gives a book to Spencer's ex, Toby, in "In the Eye Abides the Heart," "Spencer" bumps into Ezra Fitz at an airport while she talks to Wren and in "Choose or Lose", "Spencer" sleeps with Toby.

In the season and series finale, "Till Death Do Us Part", a year has passed since A.D. went under the radar after discovering Mona Vanderwaal as Charlotte's killer. Mary Drake receives a visit in prison from Alex posing as Spencer. Later that night, Mona knocks the real Spencer Hastings unconscious at A.D.'s request. Spencer wakes up in a cell and looks at what she believes to be a mirror before it is revealed to be Alex. Alex shares her entire past with Spencer, including her previous moments that she posed as her. Alex reveals that she had once forced Wren to shoot her in order to match Spencer's gunshot wound and that the plan was to physically replace Spencer, but she later murdered Wren when she realized he would always see her as Alex.

Alex poses as Spencer to attend Aria and Ezra's wedding. However, Ezra is missing, and it is revealed that Alex is holding him prisoner in the same bunker Spencer's trapped in. Once Alex returns to the bunker, Ezra and Spencer attempt to convince Alex they understand her motives for becoming "A.D." However, Alex, who has fallen in love with Toby, remains determined to take Spencer's place in life. Pretending to be Spencer in public, Alex bumps into Toby at a barn. Toby is concerned after Spencer's horse, recognizing that Alex isn't Spencer, refuses to be ridden by her. Toby's stepsister, the blind Jenna Marshall, also has a run in with Alex. She is unable to recognize Alex's scent and calls Toby to warn him that there's an impostor posing as Spencer. Toby, the Liars and Caleb Rivers are able to determine Spencer and Ezra's location. After rescuing them, Toby is able to determine the real Spencer between her and Alex, and Alex and Mary are arrested. Sometime later, Mona is running a doll store in France where she holds Alex and Mary hostage.

=== Pretty Little Liars: The Perfectionists ===
It is implied during the first episode of Pretty Little Liars: The Perfectionists that Alex and Mary escaped from Mona's dollhouse and are now on the run.

== Reception ==
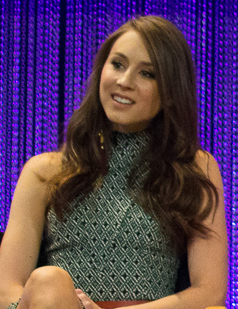
Bellisario's performance received mixed opinions.

The character's introduction and subsequent reveal as the series' final antagonist was met with a deeply polarizing response. Many viewers expressed considerable dissatisfaction in regards to Alex's backstory and motives. Moreover, Troian Bellisario's performance also faced mixed reviews, with her attempt at a British accent being singled out for criticism.

Some television critics were welcoming towards the twist. Gavin Hetherington of SpoilerTV enjoyed Alex's reveal as "A.D." and her connection to Spencer, stating it was "actually well done." Yana Grebenyuk of TVFanatic echoes the same sentiments of praise, writing that "Alex delivered above and beyond what a Spencer twin could have actually turned out to be. She was truly everything A.D. should have been, including ruthless and ready to kill anyone in her way."

However, several other critics shared opinions similar to most target audience members. Isabella Biedenharn of Entertainment Weekly was unhappy towards some of Alex's characteristics, asking herself: "did she really need to have a Cockney accent?! Couldn't she just be regular British, if she had to be British at all?" While writing for Vulture, Jessica Goldstein gave the character introduction an unfavorable review, saying: "For me, it came way too late in the game to pack any punch, except for the punch she used to knock Spencer out. The idea that Alex wants to single white female Spencer because she's jealous that Spencer won the parent lottery — which is really saying something about that lousy orphanage, considering Mr. Hastings's whole deal — is not exactly all that original or exciting of a concept."
