= Till Death Do Us Part (Pretty Little Liars) =

- Pretty Little Liars episode
- The Liars saying a brief goodbye to each other during the episode's final moments. From left to right: Alison, Aria, Hanna, Emily and Spencer.
- Episode no.: Season 7 Episode 20
- Directed by: I. Marlene King
- Story by: I. Marlene King &; Kyle Bown
- Teleplay by: I. Marlene King &; Maya Goldsmith
- Cinematography by: Larry Reibman
- Editing by: Jill D'Agnenica
- Production code: 2M7220
- Original air date: June 27, 2017
- Running time: 89 minutes

Guest appearances
- Chad Lowe as Byron Montgomery (special guest star); Holly Marie Combs as Ella Montgomery (special guest star); Mary Page Keller as Dianne Fitzgerald; Torrey DeVitto as Melissa Hastings; Keegan Allen as Toby Cavanaugh; Lesley Fera as Veronica Hastings; Brendan Robinson as Lucas Gottesman; Julian Morris as Wren Kingston; Vanessa Ray as Charlotte Drake; Huw Collins as Archer Dunhill; Jim Titus as Barry Maple; Sydney Sweeney as Willa; Celesse Rivera as Hadley St. Germain; Ava Allan as Addison Derringer; Tammin Sursok as Jenna Marshall; Nia Peeples as Pam Fields

Episode chronology
← Previous "Farewell, My Lovely"	Next → —
- Pretty Little Liars (season 7)

"Till Death Do Us Part" is the series finale of Pretty Little Liars, which premiered on the Freeform network in the United States on June 27, 2017. The twentieth episode of the seventh season and the 160th overall, it was directed by showrunner I. Marlene King, who also co-wrote the episode alongside Kyle Bown and Maya Goldsmith. Shortly after the two-hour final episode, a special titled "A-List Wrap Party" was aired, in which the main cast and King talked about the show's end and behind-the-scenes exclusives.

In the episode, the Liars finally discover the identity of their tormentor, as Spencer (Troian Bellisario) discovers she has an identical twin sister named Alex Drake, who is revealed to be the anonymous "A.D." wanting to avenge Charlotte's death and take over Spencer's life as an impersonator due to her jealousy of the life that her sister has.

The episode opened to lukewarm reviews from critics. Alex Drake's introduction and subsequent reveal as the series' final antagonist was met with a deeply polarizing response. Some viewers expressed dissatisfaction in regards to Alex's backstory and motives. Upon its initial airing, the episode was viewed by 1.41 million Americans and garnered a 0.7/2 Nielsen rating/share in the 18–49 demographic. The total viewership and ratings for this episode were considerably higher than the previous episode, and slightly higher than the sixth-season finale, a year earlier.

== Plot ==
At night, the Liars are shown at an establishment discussing the fact that the truth about who was behind Uber A's mask never came out. Lucas appears in a white tuxedo tap dancing, while Jenna is riding a horse. The girls begin to talk about random and funny things until snow starts to fall from the sky and it is revealed that the previous scenes were the product of Mona's imagination, who is holding a snow globe in an unknown room at the Welby State Hospital. An "A.D." then appears and Mona drops the globe, breaking it instantly, as she gets surprised when she realizes who's there.

In 2018, one year after the events of "Farewell, My Lovely", Ezra and Aria are discussing their book and its soon-to-be film adaptation in the Warner Bros. Television backlot. Now famous due to their book's worldwide success, they kiss and are photographed by a bunch of fans in a cart (staff writers of PLL in a group cameo). The scene then jumps to the DiLaurentis house, where Emily and her high school sweetheart Alison are living a family life, taking care of the recently born Lily and Grace. Alison tells Emily she is going to a meeting, but instead she goes to the Radley to talk with Emily's mother, Pam, about their relationship and how both Alison and Pam are happy about it. Spencer and Melissa have a sisterly moment together as Spencer sees Toby approaching her pickup truck which used to be Toby's pickup. They talk about his return to Rosewood after he left to travel around countries with Spencer and Alison's half-brother Jason. At the school, Alison discusses with Addison, who jokes about Alison's friend Aria. While leaving the room, Addison is pressed down by Alison, who threatens her. After, Alison observes Addison's clique while Emily approaches and the two ask student Claire if Addison was bullying her, which she denies. Jenna then approaches Addison, who jokes about her blindness, and Jenna argues with her, saying she can smell a bitch a mile away. Addison's clique leaves and Jenna passes by Alison and Emily, who smile to her in joy. After Mona was released from the psychiatric hospital, she is accepted by Hanna in her loft, which jeopardizes Hanna's relationship with Caleb, who thinks Hanna has done enough for Mona. Hanna and Caleb leave Mona in the apartment to go to a surprise dinner planned by Spencer, who remodeled the Lost Woods Resort into a modern establishment. There, they eat and have fun remembering good times in their lives. The camera soon shows someone in a black hoodie watching them. The person turns around and is revealed to be Melissa. However, she walks in the forest and it is revealed that "Melissa" is a mask, revealing the person underneath to be Mona, who is back on the A Team. The couples, meanwhile, retire to their rooms. Later, Spencer finds Aria crying in the living room, who reveals to the Liars that she is sterile. In the woods, Mona, who overheard Aria's news, starts talking with A.D. through FaceTime and tries to convince them to use the information against Aria. A.D. refuses to use the information and also refuses to divulge their identity to Mona at that time. The next morning, Hanna and Caleb arrive home and find Mona gone only to have her appear from the bathroom, claiming to have been in the shower. Meanwhile, Aria reveals her condition to Ezra.

In the jail, Spencer visits Mary and asks her for help. Later, in Aria's rehearsal dinner, Hanna takes Mona with her, and the Liars — and Hanna's mother — condemn it. Hanna manages to convince her friends to give Mona a chance. Ezra and Byron talk about Ezra's marriage with Aria, and Byron gives him his blessing. Later, Alison proposes to Emily who accepts.

Spencer shows up at Toby's room at the Radley and they have sex. Right after, she is at the Barn and is knocked down by Mona. She then wakes up on the floor of a modern strange room which resembles the one from "Game Over, Charles". She looks at herself in a supposed mirror and puts her hand on her head. However, her "reflection" lifts down her hand and scares her, revealing that it is not a mirror. Mary Drake then appears and injects a sedative into Spencer, while she looks on in shock at the woman who looks exactly like her. Spencer soon awakens and comes face to face with her long lost identical twin sister named Alex Drake who is also revealed to be their tormentor known as "A.D." and the third daughter of Mary Drake who was sold by their mother in order to fund her release from Radley. She lived in London on the streets where she came across Wren Kingston whom she dated and learned about her twin sister and her family. She soon met her half sister Charlotte and the two instantly connected as well as befriending Archer Dunhill who had met Charlotte on the plane after she left Rosewood to get away from being arrested for killing Wilden. Once Charlotte left, Alex soon came to Rosewood and learned about her half sister's fateful death which triggered her to become A.D. and also she was jealous of the life that Spencer lived. She also posed as Spencer multiple times when she kissed Toby in "The Darkest Knight" and had sex with him in "Choose or Lose" and appeared to Hanna when she was being held by Alex in her dream sequence for confessing to killing Charlotte. Alex also shot Spencer in the blind school and got Wren to shoot her in the shoulder so she would be like her twin sister and soon re-formed the A Team, now consisting of Jenna, Sydney, Aria, Wren and eventually Mona and Mary and reveals some of their motives. Jenna offered to help Alex without knowing who she was in exchange for Alex to pay for her eyesight and Sydney was stealing from her bank and Alex blackmailed her into acting as A.D. because she fit the hoodie. She also reveals that she killed Wren because he wouldn't view her as Spencer and she subsequently turned his ashes into a diamond necklace.

Alex goes to the Liars posing as her sister where Ezra is missing. Aria begins to worry that she will be ditched at the altar because of her infertility. Alex holds Emily and Alison's babies and secretly reveals to no one listening that Wren Kingston is their biological father and she impregnated Alison when she was at Welby. Ezra is also locked up with Spencer after he discovered about Alex's existence. The Liars soon find out about Alex Drake and discover that Mona is "A" again with Alex and she broke Mary out of prison because Wren visited her in Welby and was intent on killing her but she offered her help. Mona then tells them the location of the lair which is underneath Toby's house that he built. Ezra and Spencer escape but find that they are still being held underground just as Alex, wielding an axe, appears and knocks out Ezra and attempts to kill Spencer. The Liars, as well as Toby, arrive in time to come face to face with the identical twins. Toby struggles to decide which one of them to arrest until he asks Alex what her favourite poem is but Spencer instead gives the answer thus confirming the identity of the two and Alex is arrested by a cop along with Mary. Aria finally marries Ezra soon afterwards.

The Liars are seen in the town square exchanging goodbyes, as Aria prepares to leave for her honeymoon with Ezra and Hanna reveals that she is pregnant. In France, Mona is seen running a doll shop and it is revealed that the "cop" who arrested Mary and Alex is her boyfriend and Mona now has them held captive in her personal dollhouse, thus revealing that Mona has won the "A" game that she created. Back in Rosewood, a new group of Liars are at a sleepover and one of them is Hadley St. Germain, Maya St. Germain's niece. They notice that their leader, Addison Derringer, is missing. The episode ends with a girl named Willa revealing to Hadley, "I think I heard her scream".

== Development ==
The story was drafted by series creator I. Marlene King and Kyle Bown, while its teleplay was composed by King and executive producer Maya Goldsmith. This is the only season finale not entirely written solely by King. The episode was aired as a two-hour special event. Directed by King, it was filmed in October 2016 in and around Los Angeles, California, mostly on the backlot of the Warner Bros. studio lot in Burbank. Filming started in October 5 and wrapped in October 26, marking it the last day of filming for Pretty Little Liars ever. Scenes at the set for the fictional Lost Woods Resort were filmed.

On August 29, 2016, King and the principal cast of the series announced that Pretty Little Liars was ending after the seventh season. King also announced that it would start airing the second half of the season later than usual, in April 2017 and that the series finale would be a two-hour episode event. On October 26, 2016, it was reported that a tell-all special would be aired after the series finale, during which the main cast members and King would talk about the show with behind-the-scenes exclusives.

== Casting ==
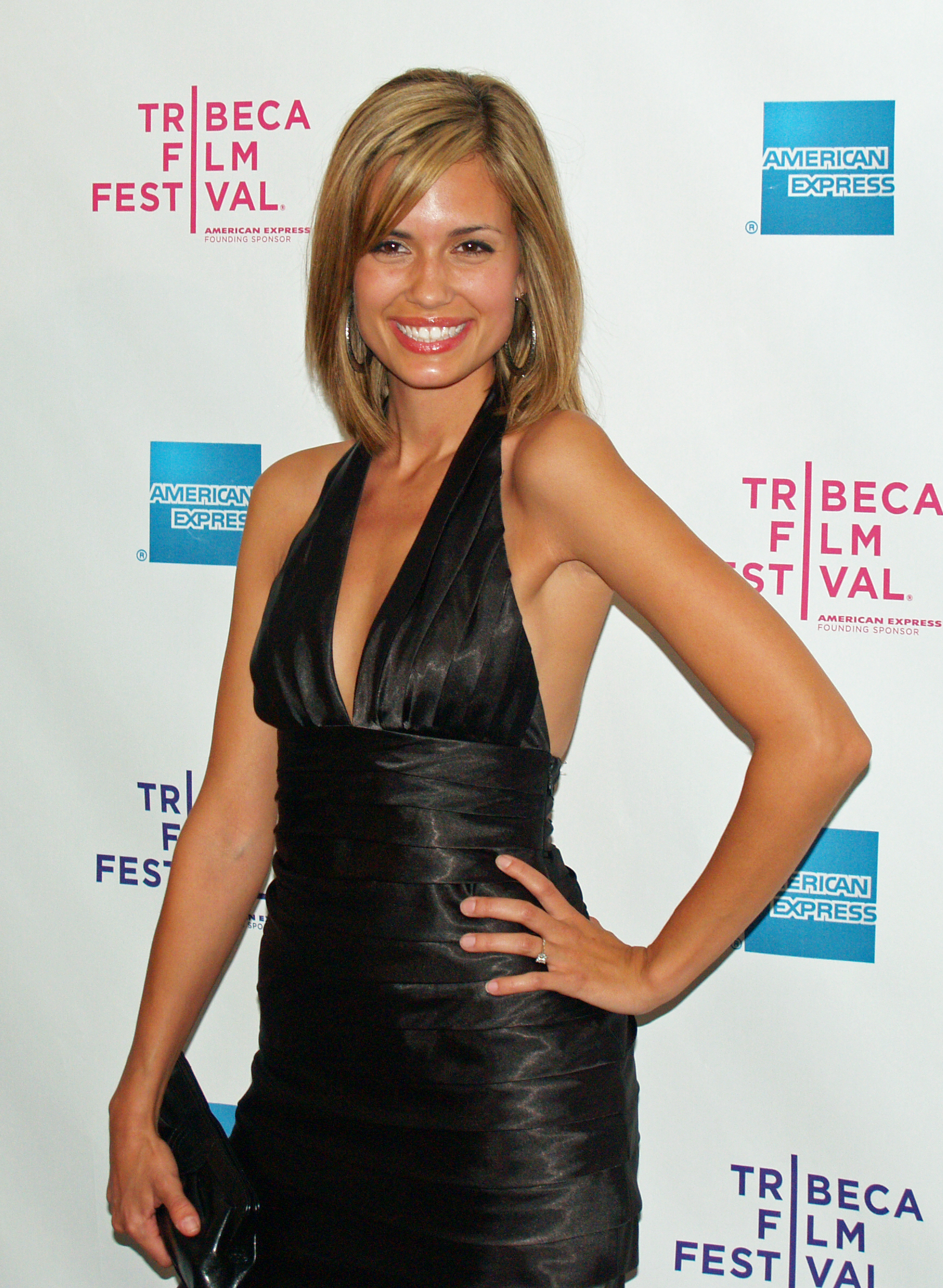
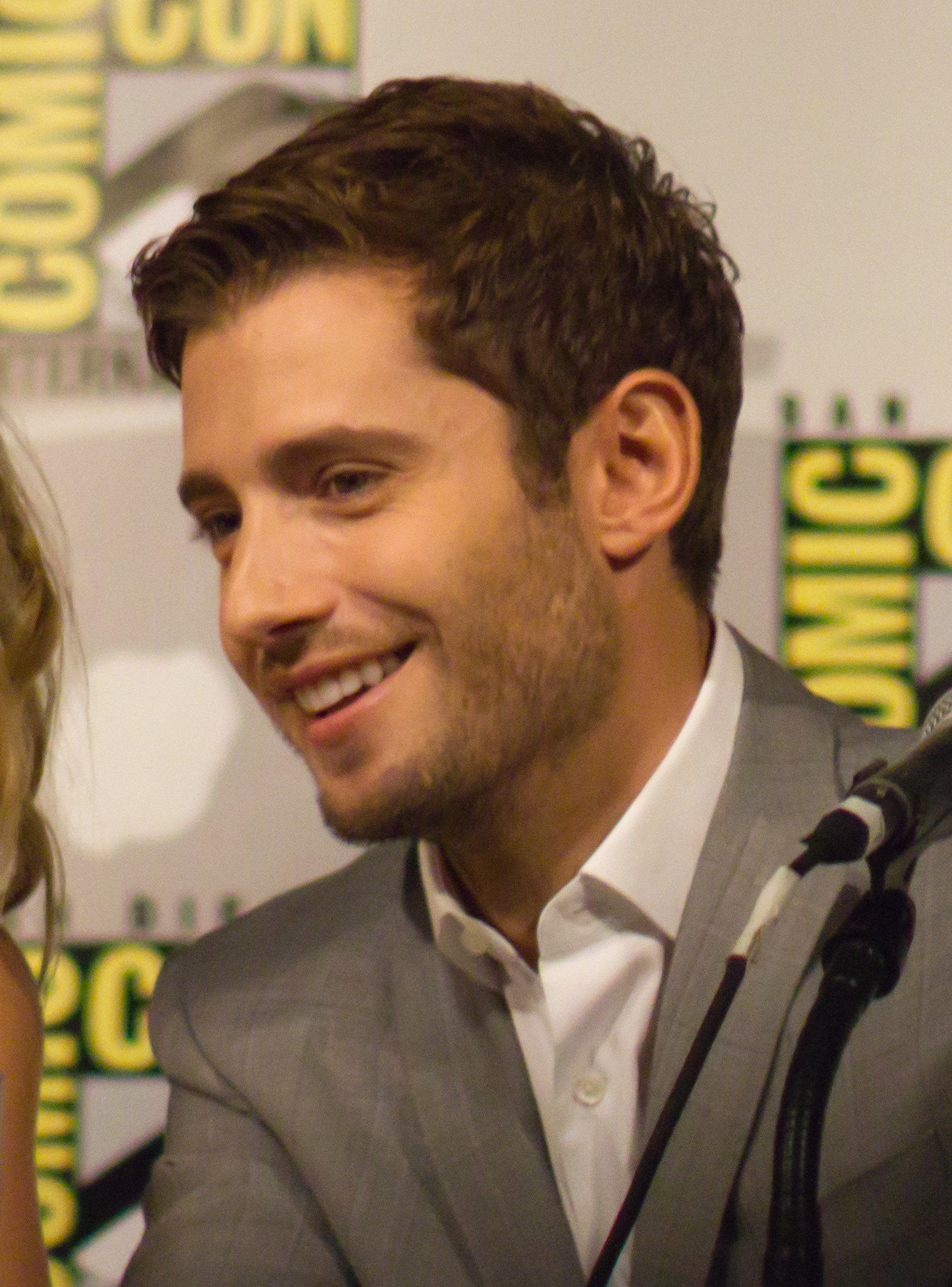
Torrey DeVitto (left) and Julian Morris (right) returned for the series' final episode, making it DeVitto's first appearance in the season, and Morris' second.

"Till Death Do Us Part" saw the return of several past recurring characters, including Holly Marie Combs and Chad Lowe as Ella and Byron Montgomery, Mary Page Keller as Dianne Fitzgerald, Torrey DeVitto as Melissa Hastings, Julian Morris as Wren Kingston, Keegan Allen as Toby Cavanaugh, Lesley Fera as Veronica Hastings, Vanessa Ray as Charlotte Drake, Brendan Robinson as Lucas Gottesman, Huw Collins as Archer Dunhill, Jim Titus as Barry Maple, Ava Allan as Addison Derringer, Tammin Sursok as Jenna Marshall, and Nia Peeples as Pam Fields.

The episode also features Sydney Sweeney as Willa, Celesse Rivera as Hadley St. Germain, Raquel McPeek as Claire, and Dalton Cyr as Luke. Showrunner I. Marlene King, her wife Shari Rosenthal, and their sons Atticus and Emerson have cameo roles in the episode.

== Reception ==
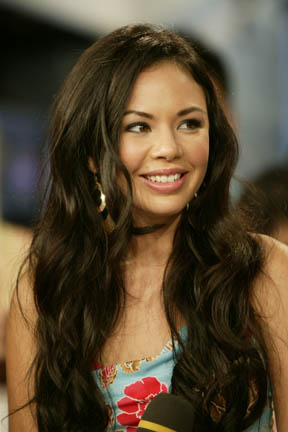
Janel Parrish's (pictured) character Mona was highly praised by critics.

=== Critical response ===
Jessica Goldstein of Vulture gave the episode a 3 out of 5 stars rating, writing a mixed review for it. Gavin Hetherington highlighted some lines of the episode, praising Mona's triumph over "A.D.", commenting: "Mona hasn't really changed in her obsession with playing with dolls (and people), and it was just beautiful justice here. No more loser Mona. She won this one."

Carolina Preece of Den of Geek disliked the episode, but praised the show as a whole, writing, "At its best, Pretty Little Liars was a Taylor Swift song, a Hitchcock movie, a philosophy lecture and a soap opera all at once. It was somehow about fluid identities, self-actualisation and how the patriarchy is crushing us all at the same time as being about fashion and dating." She also glorified Mona character, titling it "the best thing the show ever did."

Some television critics were welcoming towards the introduction of Spencer's identical twin sister. Gavin Hetherington of SpoilerTV enjoyed Alex's reveal as "A.D." and her connection to Spencer, stating it was "actually well done." Yana Grebenyuk of TVFanatic echoes the same sentiments of praise, writing that "Alex delivered above and beyond what a Spencer twin could have actually turned out to be. She was truly everything A.D. should have been, including ruthless and ready to kill anyone in her way."

Conversely, Isabella Biedenharn of Entertainment Weekly was unhappy towards some of Alex's characteristics, asking herself: "did she really need to have a Cockney accent?! Couldn’t she just be regular British, if she had to be British at all?" While writing for Vulture, Goldstein gave the character introduction an unfavorable review, saying: "For me, it came way too late in the game to pack any punch, except for the punch she used to knock Spencer out. The idea that Alex wants to single white female Spencer because she’s jealous that Spencer won the parent lottery — which is really saying something about that lousy orphanage, considering Mr. Hastings’s whole deal — is not exactly all that original or exciting of a concept."

=== Ratings ===
"Till Death Do Us Part" was viewed by 1.41 million viewers upon its first broadcast, acquiring a 0.7 Nielsen rating/share among the 18–49 demographic. It was second most watched episode of the season, and was slightly up from the sixth-season finale a year ago.

The "A-List Wrap Party" special was watched by 0.62 million viewers.
