= Bedlam (Pretty Little Liars) =

- Pretty Little Liars episode
- Episode no.: Season 7 Episode 2
- Directed by: Tawnia McKiernan
- Written by: Joseph Dougherty
- Editing by: Jill D'Agnenica
- Original air date: June 28, 2016

Guest appearances
- Brendan Robinson as Lucas Gottesman; Huw Collins as Elliott Rollins; Roberto Aguire as Liam Greene; David Coussins as Jordan Hobart; Gwen Holloway as the nurse

Episode chronology
← Previous "Tick-Tock, Bitches"	Next → "The Talented Mr. Rollins"
- List of Pretty Little Liars episodes

"Bedlam" is the second episode of the seventh season of the mystery drama television series Pretty Little Liars, which aired on June 28, 2016, on the cable network Freeform. The episode was written by Joseph Dougherty and directed by Tawnia McKiernan.

The episode focuses on the protagonists growing suspicious of Elliott as Ali's condition worsens. Spencer and Caleb's relationship is on the rocks. Liam helps Aria and Ezra on their book. Hanna and Jordan's engagement falls down, and Hanna signs a contract with Lucas to construct a fashion company.

"Bedlam" yielded 1.24 million viewers and a 0.6 demo rating, down from the previous episode.

== Plot summary ==
Mary (Andrea Parker) drives an abused Hanna (Ashley Benson) home, while commenting on secrets and disturbing families. Mary tells Hanna that some families hide secrets, and also that sometimes these secrets are actually people. Hanna asks Mary if she's one of the secret people, and she answers "not anymore."

Later, when Hanna is already safe, Caleb (Tyler Blackburn) and Aria (Lucy Hale) ask her if she really doesn't want to go to a doctor, as she says that the doctors would make questions, claiming that she wouldn't want to answers them. Spencer (Troian Bellisario) and Emily (Shay Mitchell) reveal to Hanna everything about Mary, confirming that she was a patient at Radley Sanitarium, and is Jessica DiLaurentis' twin sister. Hanna then concludes that Mary is “Uber A.” Following, Hanna questions herself why Mary didn't chased her — instead she left her safe and sound, and Ezra (Ian Harding) says that they gave her Charlotte's murderer. Caleb and Aria reveal that they suspected of Alison, and Hanna asks Spencer for something more powerful than coffee. While Spencer is looking for something, Caleb approaches Hanna and hands her the ring that symbolizes her engagement with Jordan. Someones knocks at the door and Ezra goes to see who is it. He finds a jar of flowers with a message from “A.D.”

In Lucas's apartment, Hanna, Emily, Spencer and Caleb go in, and Caleb hands Hanna a package which Lucas delivered. Emily tries to help Hanna, but she answers in a rough way, and Emily calls Spencer for a talk. Caleb again tries a conversation with Hanna, but she avoids him, although they do talk about their kiss in the previous days. Emily realizes that Spencer is missing and goes out for looking for her. She finds her outside the apartment and they argue if Alison is safe inside the psychiatric hospital. The two then agree that Hanna has the same look she previously had, while she and the others were trapped inside A's Dollhouse.

Caleb and Spencer, in sequence, discuss about Hanna, while Spencer is still working on the paperwork of her mother's campaign. Meanwhile, Emily receives a disturbing call from Alison, who is begging for help as a nurse tries to remove the cellphone from her hands. At the Welby State, Emily tries to visit Alison, but a nurse confirms that only family members can see her, and, following, Elliott (Huw Collins) repeats that Alison's conditions isn't the best and rapidly avoids his conversation with Emily, leaving her unresigned.

At the Radley Hotel, Hanna and Lucas (Brendan Robinson) talk about the opportunity that Lucas gave her of opening her very own fashion business. She then snapped that she's not the wonderful person that everyone think that she is, and Lucas encourages her. Following, Emily tells Spencer that Alison sounded frightened, and Emily urges the possibility of using Mary to visit Alison, since Mary's family. However, Spencer declines the idea. At the Montgomery family house, Aria and Liam (Roberto Aguire) discuss about the turbulent end of their relationship. Neither is happy with what happened, and, plus, Liam reveals that he's the editor of the book that was co-written between Aria and Ezra, putting more wood on the fire.

Back at the apartment, Hanna begins to wonder if she will sign Lucas' contract. She then has a flashback about the night when she and Jordan first met. A busy Hanna talks on the phone with somebody else, and, after ending the call, she realizes that somebody put a drink on her napkin, which had an important number written on it. She then draws the man's attention, and he (David Coussins) helps her on unveiling the number. The two then join each other for a dinner, and they pass all night long on the restaurant. Back in present, Hanna decides not the sign the contract. Aria, Emily and Spencer go talk with Elliott in order to gain the opportunity to visit Alison, and he continues to deny it. While Elliott is talking with someone on the phone, the girls receive a new message from “A.D.” and they realize that the stalker maybe is not so far as they think. Hanna is then shown inside Jordan's office, and she invites him to have a drink at the same bar they were told at the night they first met. Once again, Emily and Spencer argue about using Mary as a way to visit Alison.

Aria and Ezra talk about Elliott and their book. After, they hold hands, and Liam is shown inside his car watching them. Following, Liam and Ezra are arguing about the book, and Liam insults Ezra's writing however Ezra stays calm. In Veronica's campaign office, Spencer is talking with someone on the phone, and Mary shows up. Initially, Mary says that she was waiting to know how Hanna is. The two then discuss Mary's attitude of not leading Hanna to the hospital or to the police. Mary then says that her experiences with hospitals and with the police weren't great, and, in sequence, Mary tells Spencer the reason why she was committed to Radley, many years ago. Mary reports that her twin-sister, Jessica, and she were 14-years-old, and Jessica was babysitting a boy. Jessica telephoned Mary, claiming that the baby didn't stop crying; but, when Mary arrived at the house, the baby was quiet anyway. Jessica then asked Mary to stay home while she was talking to a boyfriend. When the baby's parents arrived at the house, they found the baby drowned in the bathtub, and Jessica threw the blame on Mary, even with her being innocent. In the next scene, Ezra reveals Liam's bad behavior to Aria, and she gets scared.

In New York City, Hanna and Jordan arrives at a closed Columbus bar where they first met. Hanna gets angry, and ends up ending their engagement. At the Radley Hotel, Mary shows up and starts remembering the old Radley Sanitarium. Emily helps her and they deal to visit Alison together. Lucas and Hanna then speak about the contract for a fashion business, and, with the end of her engagement, Hanna ends up signing the contract. Aria and Liam discuss about Ezra and the book, and Liam says that Aria was abused by his teacher while in high school, and Aria denies it. At the psychiatric hospital, Alison wakes up and sees Emily. Alison asks for Emily's help, stating that Elliott is a bad person, and Alison sees Mary and starts thinking that she is her mother, Jessica. However, Elliott enters the room and he kicks out everybody, including the nurse (Gwen Holloway). In the hallway, Elliott asks to talk with Mary; and, inside an office, Mary complains that she was calling Elliott for two days, without an answer and tells Elliott that he has gone too far. Elliott says that Mary should not appear in the hospital and tells her to leave him to his work. Emily, meanwhile, is watching their shadows through an unfocused window.

At the Hastings family loft-barn, Spencer reveals to Caleb that she was fired. Spencer asks Caleb if they made a mistake when they started a romantic relationship, and Caleb denies it. However, Spencer complains that he is using the verb in the past. Back at the hospital, Emily sends a text to the girls, asking what is happening between Mary and Elliott, since she saw their shadows during a "fight."

The episode ends with Ali being drugged by someone — perhaps Elliott — and taken to somewhere else.

== Production ==
The episode was written by the series' executive producer Joseph Dougherty and directed by Tawnia McKiernan. The name of the episode was by revealed by Dougherty via Twitter on April 6, 2016. The table read for the episode occurred on April 14, 2016. Filming started on April 19 and wrapped on April 26.

== Reception ==
=== Ratings ===
"Bedlam" premiered in the United States on Freeform on June 28, 2016. The episode was watched by 1.24 million Americans and scored a 0.6 Nielsen rating/share in the adults among the 18–49 demographic. It was down in both viewers and adults 18–49, respectively, from the previous episode, "Tick-Tock, Bitches", which netted 1.43 million American viewers and a 0.7 Nielsen rating/share. After Live +3 DVR ratings, the episode tied for the tenth spot in Adults 18–49, finishing with a 1.0 rating among adults aged 18–49, and aired to a total viewership of 2.05 million, placing in the fifteenth spot in viewership.

=== Critical response ===
Caitlin White of Wetpaint gave a favorable review for the episode and praised its title, writing: “There was definitely chaos and confusion — and a lot of it centered on a mental institution, if you want to look up an old-school definition of 'bedlam.'” Jessica Goldstein of Vulture gave the episode 3 out of 5 stars.

While writing for TV Equals, Mark Trammell gave a mixed review for “Bedlam”, commenting: “So, definitely more of a transitional episode, with the mission being more to shed light on certain things rather than move the plot forward in any significant way. While episodes like this can often be meh, this one wasn’t, simply because the information that we did get was so juicy and the acting was rock solid across the board. Pretty much everyone in the main cast got a chance to shine, each getting their own moment at some point, which was nice, so I can’t complain.”
