= K.C. Undercover =

American comedy series (2015–2018)

- Genre: Comedy; Spy fiction
- Created by: Corinne Marshall
- Starring: Zendaya; Veronica Dunne; Kamil McFadden; Trinitee Stokes; Tammy Townsend; Kadeem Hardison
- Theme music composer: Andrew Love; Joacim Persson; Johan Alkenas
- Opening theme: "Keep It Undercover" by Zendaya
- Composer: Bert Selen
- Country of origin: United States
- Original language: English
- No. of seasons: 3
- No. of episodes: 75 (list of episodes)

Production
- Executive producers: Rob Lotterstein; Jared Hoffman; Eileen Conn; Darin Henry
- Producers: Vic Kaplan; Jenn Lloyd & Kevin Bonani; Kevin O'Donnell; Zendaya
- Cinematography: Joseph W. Calloway; John Simmons
- Camera setup: Multi-camera
- Running time: 21–29 minutes
- Production companies: Rob Lotterstein Productions; It's a Laugh Productions

Original release
- Network: Disney Channel
- Release: January 18, 2015 – February 2, 2018

K.C. Undercover is an American comedy television series created by Corinne Marshall that aired on Disney Channel from January 18, 2015 to February 2, 2018. The series stars Zendaya, Veronica Dunne, Kamil McFadden, Trinitee Stokes, Tammy Townsend, and Kadeem Hardison.

== Premise ==
Set in Washington, D.C., the series follows K.C. Cooper, a high school math genius, who gets recruited by her parents after she discovers that they are secretly undercover spies working for an agency called The Organization. Her brother tries to help because he feels left out and eventually joins the team, and his desire leads his mother and father to get a new robot child. Each episode centers on K.C. and her family as they contend with common familial issues while also performing missions to save the country, with a recurring storyline involving thwarting the plans of a criminal organization.

== Episodes ==
Season	Episodes	Originally released	
Season	Episodes	First released	Last released
1	27	January 18, 2015	January 24, 2016
2	24	March 6, 2016	January 13, 2017
3	24	July 7, 2017	February 2, 2018

== Cast and characters ==
=== Main ===
- Zendaya as K.C. Cooper, a high school student by day and an undercover spy whenever. She is highly proficient at math and karate. She is a member of a government spy organization. She is the daughter of Kira and Craig Cooper. Sister to Ernie Cooper. Granddaughter to Gayle King and Othello King.
- Veronica Dunne as Marisa Clark, K.C.'s best friend. She is cheerful, bubbly, girly, and a very outgoing person. In "Photo Bombed", she learns about K.C.'s spy life and sometimes tags along in missions.
- Kamil McFadden as Ernie Cooper, K.C. and Judy's brother and a stereotypical nerd. He is a computer genius and joins the family's spy team in "My Sister From Another Mother... Board". He is often ignored by his parents, especially his father, who treats him as expendable during missions, which gives him a severe inferiority complex.
- Trinitee Stokes as Judy Cooper, K.C. and Ernie's sarcastic robot sister who looks like a 10-year-old girl. Her robotic nature makes her very smart, but she has no social skills, although she is considered to be sassy. Her name stands for "Junior Undercover Digital Youth". She does not appear in the show until "My Sister from Another Mother... Board", when the Cooper parents believe Ernie wouldn't make a good enough spy before he quickly proves them wrong.
- Tammy Townsend as Kira Cooper, mother to K.C., Ernie, and Judy, and also an undercover spy.
- Kadeem Hardison as Craig Cooper, father to K.C., Ernie, and Judy, and also an undercover spy.

=== Recurring ===
- Rick Hall as Agent Johnson, an elite member of The Organization. In "K.C. Undercover: The Final Chapter", it is revealed that he is a villain called The Mask and is jealous of Beverly for being the head of the Organization.
- Sherri Shepherd as Beverly, the head of the Organization. She is good friends with the Cooper family.
- James DiGiacomo as Petey, a "friend" of Judy's. Judy finds him annoying, as he has proven to be skeptical of the Cooper household, when Judy is alone. He's shown to be obnoxious and loud every time he screams out Judy's name.
- Jaime Moyer as Mrs. Goldfeder, the Coopers' neighbor and Petey's mother. Like Petey, she is also obnoxious and loud, frequently visiting the Cooper's house.
- Ross Butler as Brett Willis, an enemy spy and K.C.'s ex-boyfriend. In "Operation: Other Side, Part 2", it is shown that Brett was kicked out of the Organization, after he was discovered working as a double agent and being the son of Zane. He now works for the Other Side as a hand-to-hand combat instructor. In "K.C. and Brett: The Final Chapter – Part 1", Brett was sent to kill K.C., but failed, and he is now currently on the run from the Other Side in Canada.
- François Chau as Zane, a member of the Other Side and the father of Brett. After Richard is captured by the Coopers, he becomes the new leader of the Other Side until he is apprehended again.
- Lee Reherman as Victor, the underboss of the Other Side.
- Kara Royster as Abby, the long-lost cousin of K.C. and Ernie and the daughter of Erica Martin and Richard Martin. She is secretly a member of the Other Side who was sent to reactivate her mother's status.
- Jasmine Guy as Erica, the sister of Kira, the estranged wife of Richard Martin, the mother of Abby, the aunt of K.C. and Ernie, and a member of the Other Side who went inactive.
- Rick Fox as Richard, the father of Abby, the husband of Erica, and the uncle of K.C. and Ernie. He is the leader of the Other Side that has eluded the Organization.
- Connor Weil as Brady, an enemy agent who works for a renegade spy organization known as the Alternate. He appears in the third season where he manipulates Marisa into helping him following Zane's arrest. In the episode "Revenge of the Van People", it is revealed that he is a double agent now working for the Organization. In the series finale, he decides to resign from the Organization to be in a true genuine relationship with Marisa.

== Production ==
The series was first announced as a pilot in pre-production titled Super Awesome Katy in November 2013. The series was set to star Shake It Up star Zendaya, who would play 16-year-old Katy Cooper, an outspoken and confident technology wiz and skilled black belt, who discovers that both her parents are spies who expect her to follow in their footsteps. Production on the pilot was set to begin in early 2014. On November 6, 2013, Zendaya tweeted about the pilot, saying she wants to bring back the "cool Disney Channel", mentioning shows That's So Raven, Lizzie McGuire, The Proud Family, and Kim Possible. It was ordered to series by Disney Channel in May 2014, with the series now under the title K.C. Undercover. The series was released on Watch Disney Channel on January 1, 2015, and was followed by the television premiere on January 18, 2015. The first season consisted of 27 episodes. On May 15, 2015, Disney Channel renewed the series for a second season, which premiered on March 6, 2016. On August 1, 2016, People revealed that the series had been renewed for a third season. The third season premiered on Disney Channel on July 7, 2017, and ended on February 2, 2018.

== Broadcast ==
In Canada, the series premiered on Family Channel on January 23, 2015, and moved to Disney Channel on September 1, 2015. During the launch week of Disney Channel, the episode "Runaway Robot" aired on September 1, 2015, a week before the U.S. The series premiered on Disney Channel in Australia and New Zealand on March 5, 2015. In the United Kingdom and Ireland, the show premiered on March 27, 2015, on Disney Channel. On Disney Channel in Southeast Asia, it premiered in Singapore on March 13, 2015, and in the Philippines on April 10, 2015. The show debuted on the English feed of Disney XD in the Middle East and Africa on October 12, 2015. In India, the series premiered on October 30, 2017, on Disney International HD

== Reception ==
The series has received generally positive reviews. Common Sense Media rated the series 3 out of 5, writing, "Disney megastar Zendaya rescues tepid spy-comedy."

== Ratings ==
Viewership and ratings per season of K.C. Undercover
Season	Episodes	First aired		Last aired		Avg. viewers (millions)
Season	Episodes	Date	Viewers (millions)	Date	Viewers (millions)	Avg. viewers (millions)
1	27	January 18, 2015	3.51	January 24, 2016	2.02	2.30
2	24	March 6, 2016	2.08	January 13, 2017	1.18	1.51
3	24	July 7, 2017	1.24	February 2, 2018	1.16	1.10
