= Hush, Hush, Sweet Liars =

- Pretty Little Liars episode
- Episode no.: Season 6 Episode 20
- Directed by: Ron Lagomarsino
- Written by: I. Marlene King
- Editing by: Lois Blumenthal
- Original air date: March 15, 2016
- Running time: 42 minutes

Guest appearances
- Andrea Parker as Mary Drake; Keegan Allen as Toby Cavanaugh; Lesley Fera as Veronica Hastings; Nolan North as Peter Hastings; Huw Collins as Elliott Rollins; Kara Royster as Yvonne Phillips; Bryce Johnson as Darren Wilden; Gwen Holloway as the nurse; Ida Adelspenger as the voter

Episode chronology
← Previous "Did You Miss Me?"	Next → "Tick-Tock, Bitches"
- Pretty Little Liars season 6

"Hush, Hush, Sweet Liars" is the twentieth episode and the season finale of the sixth season and 140th episode overall on the Freeform mystery drama television series Pretty Little Liars. The episode was broadcast on March 15, 2016. It was written by the series' showrunner I. Marlene King and directed by Ron Lagomarsino.

== Plot ==
At the beginning of the episode, the girls, Caleb (Tyler Blackburn) and Ezra (Ian Harding) are together after Hanna (Ashley Benson) sends a false message to "A", starting her plan to serve as a guinea pig. Aria (Lucy Hale) gets a call from Alison, who is at the hospital and announces that she will be released the next day; Aria tells Emily (Shay Mitchell) that Elliott will have to go to Chicago and Alison will be alone. Hanna then receives new threats from "A", who tells her that they need to come face to face. Hanna tells "A" that she needs one more day and the stalker accepts the false proposal.

The next day, Elliott (Huw Collins) says goodbye to Alison and travels to Chicago for a conference. Spencer (Troian Bellisario) and Toby (Keegan Allen) work together to prepare a plan to discover a secret entrance in the old underground corridors of Radley. Emily returns to Lucas' apartment and delivers a few pieces to Caleb, who is preparing an electric fence to trap "A". Meanwhile, Ezra finishes writing his book and vents to Aria a few things about the disappearance of Nicole and how he feels relation to it. Alone, Alison hears a simple ballet sound and goes to her room; she unwittingly drops the object that reproduced the sound when she sees her mother covered in blood and dirt. To torment her further, Alison receives a call and a very similar voice to her mother's voice says "Did you miss me?"

At night, Emily joins Alison and they talk about Alison's hallucinations. At the election party, Toby reveals to Yvonne (Kara Royster) that he will have to solve something after the ascertainment of the elections and they end up fighting. At the house of the Hastings, Mona appears and asks for an opportunity to help in the election to Spencer, who ends up giving in and realizing how much she works well. In the forest, Caleb and Hanna prepare the trap and he explains that a sensor will take photos of anyone that shows up. Alison gets startled while sleeping and sees Darren Wilden (Bryce Johnson), the Rosewood's deceased policeman, lying on her bed; she screams and Aria and Emily comfort her.

In the next scene, Caleb and Spencer have a romantic moment; however, when Spencer says she loves him, he doesn't answer. Alison talks to Elliott by phone and reveals that Emily came out to vote; she then again sees her mother and Darren. When Aria arrives at Ezra's apartment, he tells her the great news: the book they wrote together was very well received and will have a great impact. Surprised, Aria ends up kissing Ezra. Inevitably, Ezra continues to kiss her and they end up having sex. Meanwhile, Caleb and Hanna begin to organise the abandoned room at the Lost Woods Resort and she begins to recall past events. After voting, Emily returns to Alison's house and realises that she is gone; she later finds her at the church and Alison decides that she's psychologically troubled.

At the Lost Woods Resort, Aria and Ezra are in the forest while Hanna and Caleb say goodbye; at the last moment, they kiss and Hanna turns out to reveal that she never stopped loving him. Spencer and Toby find the secret door from the corridors of Radley and Mona joins them. The trio find an old and damaged file in the secret room and find information about Mary Drake, a former Radley patient from 25 years ago. They discover that the patient had a son, Charles Drake, who was later adopted by Jessica and Kenneth DiLaurentis. Charlotte was in fact an adoptive member of the DiLaurentis family. In the woods, someone knew the plan of Caleb and eventually led them away from the motel; when Aria, Caleb and Ezra return to the abandoned room, Hanna is gone.

In Welby State Psychiatric Hospital, Alison is voluntarily admitted. Veronica wins the election for senator and a celebration takes place at Radley. Everyone celebrates, however, Spencer receives a text and she and Toby go to the Lost Woods with Mona who secretly follows them. Everyone's together and see the scenes recorded in the forest and are frightened when a video of a brunette Jessica DiLaurentis comes up. Meanwhile, in Alison's house, "Wilden" is revealed to be a mask and Elliott is revealed to be underneath, while Mary Drake approaches and reveals herself as the identical twin of Jessica DiLaurentis. She asks if Alison "signed the papers." Elliott confirms, saying that 51% of the shares of Carissimi Group were diverted at the time Alison signed her entry to the psychiatric hospital.

Yet in the forest, the girls receive a new message: "Thanks for giving me Hanna. You're free to go -A.D."

In the end, Hanna is seen being dragged inside the Rosewood Church while carrying a bouquet of lilacs — just like the ones Charlotte had when she was found dead.

== Production ==
"Hush, Hush, Sweet Liars" was written by the series' showrunner and principal collaborator I. Marlene King; the episode serves as King's third writing credit on the season. It was directed by Ron Lagomarsino, who previously directed the season's second half premiere "Of Late I Think of Rosewood". The episode's filming wrapped on October 2, 2015. The title of the episode was revealed on September 8, 2015, by Marlene King via Twitter.

== Reception ==
=== Broadcasting ===
"Hush, Hush, Sweet Liars" was broadcast in the United States on March 15, 2016, on Freeform. The episode attracted 2.19 million Americans and scored a 0.6 Nielsen rating in the 18-49 demographic, down from the previous episode, "Did You Miss Me?", which netted 1.26 million views and a 0.7 in the 18-49 demo. The episode is the season finale with the lowest audience in the series.

=== Reviews ===
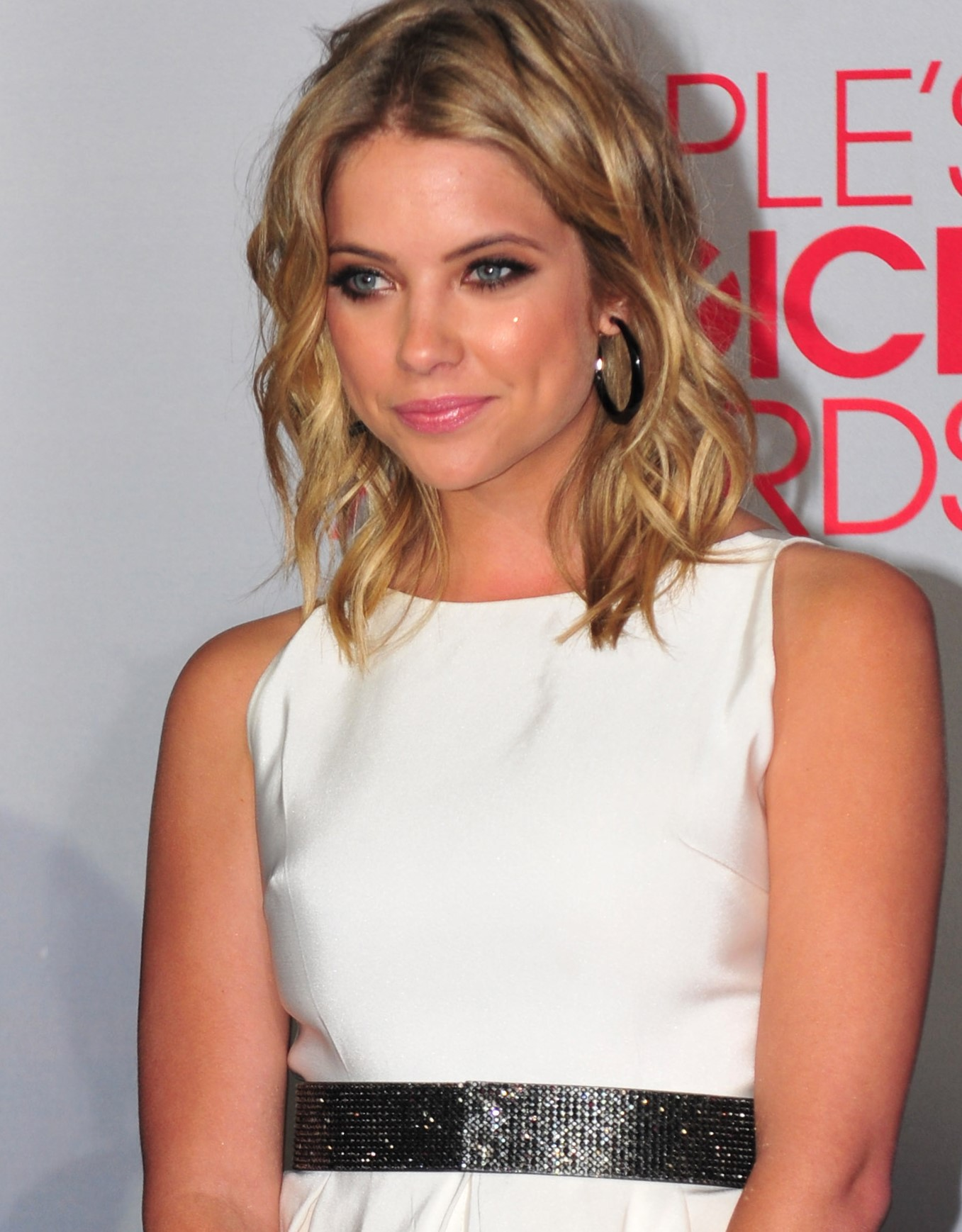
Ashley Benson's character Hanna Marin's abduction received mixed opinions.

Jeremy Rodriguez from The Young Folks wrote that the episode was a "little over-the-top", stating "that what makes Pretty Little Liars so great." Rodriguez also ranked the episode with a rating of 10/10. Paul Dailly from TV Fanatic said that "the show is heading in an interesting direction." Gavin Hetherington of SpoilerTV gave the episode a mixed review, noting that shippers of the show will love the episode for bringing several ships back together. He wrote critically that "the action was too condensed at the end to make this one of those be all, end all finales that we have kind of grown accustom to [sic]. The stakes didn't feel as high as it should be, and we all know Hanna isn't dead, so the cliffhanger just felt a little too anti-climactic.". He blames some of his disappointment on the hype surrounding the twin reveal, which he notes that it "would have been so much better if they didn't announce a twin reveal at all."
