= Trinitee Stokes =

- Born: Jackson, Mississippi, U.S.
- Occupations: Actress; singer; fashion designer
- Years active: 2013–present
- Musical career
- Genres: Pop; R&B; gospel
- Instruments: Vocals; piano
- Website: thetrinitee.com

Trinitee Stokes is an American child actress, singer and fashion designer. She is known for her role as Judy Cooper in the Disney Channel television series K.C. Undercover.

== Early life and education ==
Stokes was born in Jackson, Mississippi, the daughter of Taronta and Kia Stokes. In 2014, Stokes and her family appeared in an episode of "Family Game Night".

== Career ==
=== Acting ===
Stokes began her acting career in local theaters at the age of three. She has since appeared in numerous commercials for top national brands, including Kellogg's, Carrier and McDonald's. Her first major acting role was in the 2014 feature film Tempting Fate. In 2015, she was cast in the Disney Channel sitcom K.C. Undercover as Judy Cooper. K.C. Undercover premiered on Disney Channel on January 18, 2015, and was renewed for a third season in November 2016. Stokes also guest starred on an episode of Disney Channel sitcom Austin & Ally. In 2017, she made a guest appearance as Laura on the TV Land sitcom Teachers.

=== Author ===
Stokes landed a book deal with Zondervan Publishing at age 11. Trinitee’s award-winning book, Bold & Blessed: How to Stay True to Yourself and Stand Out from the Crowd was released in 2018.

==== Voice roles ====
Stokes lent her voice for the Princess Tiana doll from the Disney movie The Princess and the Frog. She was also a guest star on Disney Junior's Doc McStuffins.

=== Music ===
In 2013, Stokes released Win Now, an independent gospel single. In 2017, she released the independent pop single Miss Me. The song was written by Jake&Papa and produced by Jovan Dawkins.

== Fashion ==
In 2013, she hosted an episode of the TV documentary, The Designer Kids Project and unveiled Designs by Trinitee. The collection features clothing aimed at tween girls. She is often seen sporting her designs at red carpet appearances. In 2016, she unveiled her most recent collection at Fashion Fest Live in Los Angeles, CA.

== Filmography ==
=== Film ===
Year	Title	Role	Notes
2013	Daddy and Me	Destiny	
2013	Red Phone	Elaine Whitfield	
2014	Missi	Young Missi	
2015	Tempting Fate	Adaeze	
2015	That One Smile	Young Marcy	

=== Television ===
Year	Title	Role	Notes
2013	The Designer Kids Project	Herself	Host
2014	Family Game Night	Self	Contestant
2015–2018	K.C. Undercover	Judy Cooper	Main role
2015	Austin & Ally	Judy Cooper	Episode: "Scary Spirits & Spooky Stories"
2017	Teachers	Lauren	Episode: "Brokebitch Mountain"
2017	Snowfall	Lorraine	2 episodes
2017	Mani	Herself	Episode: "Cat Fight"
2018	All About the Washingtons	Brianna	Episode: "Papa Said Log You Out"
2019–2020	Coop & Cami Ask the World	Neve	7 episodes (Recurring Role)
2019–2021	Mixed-ish	Tamika	13 episodes (Recurring Role)

== See also ==
- List of African-American actors
- List of people born in Mississippi
