= Tick-Tock, Bitches =

- Pretty Little Liars episode
- Spencer and Mary's strange conversation at the Hastings residence.
- Episode no.: Season 7 Episode 1
- Directed by: Ron Lagomarsino
- Written by: I. Marlene King
- Editing by: Robert Lattanzio
- Original air date: June 21, 2016
- Running time: 42 minutes

Guest appearances
- Keegan Allen as Toby Cavanaugh; Huw Collins as Elliott Rollins; Lulu Brud as Sabrina; Ray Fonseca as the bartender

Episode chronology
← Previous "Hush... Hush, Sweet Liars"	Next → "Bedlam"
- Pretty Little Liars season 7

"Tick-Tock, Bitches" is the first episode of the seventh season of Freeform mystery drama television series Pretty Little Liars, and the 141st episode overall. It aired in the United States on June 21, 2016, serving as the season premiere. The episode was directed by Ron Lagomarsino and written by showrunner I. Marlene King.

In the episode, the Liars and company find themselves caught by a trap set by A, who has kidnapped Hanna and is holding her captive. Meanwhile, Mary begins to settle into Rosewood while Elliott continues to try to keep Alison trapped inside the psychiatric hospital.

"Tick-Tock, Bitches" yielded 1.43 million viewers and garnered a 0.7 demo rating, up from the previous episode, the sixth-season finale, and down 40 percent from the sixth-season premiere a year ago. It received praise from contemporary critics, who highlighted the show's new directions, titling the episode as a good way to start the end.

== Plot ==
Following the events of the previous episode, the Liars and their company find themselves trapped when Hanna (Ashley Benson) is kidnapped by "A.D.", the new stalker. Spencer (Troian Bellisario), teams up with Toby (Keegan Allen) in order to find clues inside the Lost Woods Resort, while Caleb (Tyler Blackburn) and Mona (Janel Parrish) investigate Mary Drake (Andrea Parker). Aria (Lucy Hale) and Ezra (Ian Harding) investigate Alison's house, while hiding from Elliott (Huw Collins). When "A.D." send a message with a photo, alerting that they only have 24 hours to save Hanna, the group get jeopardized and run against time, trying to find Charlotte's real killer—the only thing "A.D." wants most. Spencer later has a mysterious and particular conversation with Mary, who reveals that she already had seen Spencer's whole family.

Meanwhile, Emily (Shay Mitchell) goes to Welby State Psychiatric Hospital to see Alison (Sasha Pieterse), who is blaming herself for something. Worried, Emily drives to Alison's house and finds the sweater that a blonde girl was using the night Charlotte died. Emily gives the sweater to the group and Caleb flees, giving it to "A.D." in hopes of saving Hanna. Hanna has a dream with Spencer and later she uses her strength to run away from the place she was trapped inside. After running in the woods, Hanna finds Mary in a car.

In the end, Elliott applies an injection on Alison, revealing himself as a bad person to Alison and that he knows that Alison "killed" Charlotte.

== Production ==
=== Writing ===
"Tick-Tock, Bitches" was written by the series' creator I. Marlene King. King revealed the title of the episode on Twitter on March 17, 2016. Variety announced on April 7, 2016, that the season premiere would air on June 21, 2016. A promo was released on May 12, 2016 and was promoted by the hashtag "#SaveHanna".

=== Casting ===
With this episode, Andrea Parker was promoted to series regular. TVLine confirmed on March 16 that she was promoted to series regular for the seventh season, making her first appearance as a regular on this episode. Janel Parrish was confirmed to be reprising her role of Mona Vanderwaal. Actors Keegan Allen, Huw Collins and Lulu Brud return as the recurring roles of Toby Cavanaugh, Elliott Rollins and Sabrina, respectively. For the first time in the series, Laura Leighton is no longer a series regular.

=== Filming ===
The episode was directed by long-time collaborator Ron Lagomarsino. Filming for the episode started on April 4, 2016 and wrapped on April 18. The table-read for the episode occurred on April 4, 2016. Parrish started filming her scenes on April 8, 2016.

== Reception ==
=== Broadcast and ratings ===
"Tick-Tock, Bitches" was first broadcast on June 21, 2016 in the United States on Freeform. The episode was watched by 1.43 million Americans and scored a 0.7 Nielsen rating/share in the adults among the 18–49 demographic. It was up in both viewers and adults 18–49 from the previous episode "Hush... Hush, Sweet Liars", which netted 1.19 million American viewers and a 0.6/2 Nielsen rating/share. After Live +3 DVR ratings, the episode tied for the ninth spot in Adults 18–49, finishing with a 1.2 rating among adults aged 18–49, and aired to a total viewership of 2.48 million, placing in the sixteenth spot in viewership.

=== Critical response ===
The episode received generally favorable reviews from television critics.

Paul Dailly from TVFanatic appreciated the show's new directions, saying, "[the episode] was a thrilling installment of this Freeform drama. It certainly seems like the show is gearing up for a last hurrah, but Freeform could go and ruin that by trying to get another season. It's time to bring this story to a close...for good." Keertana Sastry from Entertainment Weekly praised the episode and the series' return, clarifying, "it’s just as soapy, pulpy, and entertaining as ever." Gavin Hetherington of SpoilerTV commented that "if this is the final season, they started it off right." He goes on to notice certain similarities with the final season premiere of Desperate Housewives with its opening scene, but digresses that the premiere had "a sense of finality to it, and a sense of hope that all the answers I'm searching for will be answered in the next 19 episodes."
