= Corinne Marshall =

American television writer (born 1980)

Corinne Marshall (born January 6, 1980) is an American television writer. She is the creator of the Disney television series K.C. Undercover starring Zendaya. She has written for FOX's Surviving Jack, ABC's Suburgatory, Adult Swim's NTSF:SD:SUV, the Comedy Central Roasts, the MTV Movie Awards and FXX's Stone Quackers. Marshall has written pilots for FX, Disney+, Freeform, Paramount, MTV, Disney Channel and developed series with CBS Studio. She was the Executive Producer/Showrunner of Forever 31, an ABCdigital original comedy series created by and starring Iliza Shlesinger and the head writer for Freeform late night sketch show, Truth & Iliza.

== Biography ==
Marshall was born in New York City. Marshall began her career writing for Playgirl magazine while she was attending Columbia University. After graduation, she worked as a DGA Production Associate for the CBS Evening News. Her writing has been featured in magazines and online publications including Jane Magazine, Vitals Magazine, Dame Magazine and on the front page of the Huffington Post where she was a featured blogger. Her book, The Q Guide to Will & Grace was published in 2008.

When Marshall moved to Los Angeles, she wrote and performed sketch comedy on the house "Maude" teams at the Upright Citizens Brigade Theater.

She is married to writer B. J. Porter.
