= Kara Royster =

American actress (born 1993)

Kara Mae Royster
- Born: October 5, 1993 (age 32); Palm Beach Gardens, Florida, U.S.
- Citizenship: United States; Canada
- Occupation: Actress
- Years active: 2012–present
- Spouse: Tyler Shaw (m. 2022)
- Children: 1

Kara Mae Royster (born October 5, 1993) is an American actress who holds dual American and Canadian citizenship. She is best known for portraying Yvonne Phillips in Pretty Little Liars, Abby Martin in K.C. Undercover, Alicia Banes in Supernatural, and Eva in the Dynasty reboot.

== Early life ==
Royster was born and raised in Palm Beach Gardens, Florida. Her father, former professional baseball player Jerry Royster, is Black, and her mother is white with French Canadian and Irish ancestry. Royster was inspired to get into acting by her older sister, Kristie, who would practice monologues in front of her. Royster took acting classes at Bak Middle School of the Arts and Dreyfoos High School of the Arts in West Palm Beach, Florida. At the age of 15, she convinced her parents to move to Los Angeles, California where she attended Los Angeles County High School for the Arts and majored in theatre. In addition to acting, Royster developed an interest in makeup and was the head makeup artist for her high school's theatre department.

== Career ==
Royster's early credits include Faking It on MTV, Liv and Maddie on Disney Channel, and Scream Queens on Fox, in which she had a minor role in one episode.

On December 23, 2015, it was announced that Royster was cast in Pretty Little Liars as Yvonne Phillips, the mystery woman Toby Cavanaugh (Keegan Allen) met before the five-year time jump. She was originally slated to appear in three episodes of the back-half of season six. Royster appeared as Yvonne in four episodes of season seven. Her final episode aired on May 2, 2017, titled "Hold Your Piece". In 2016, while filming Pretty Little Liars, Royster made her feature film debut in Mono. She portrayed Christina Madison, the "queen bee, mean girl" of the group. That same year, she landed roles in multiple episodes of K.C. Undercover and Supernatural. In an interview with Hush Hush Buzz, Royster revealed, "I had heard of K.C. Undercover before it came out, while I was filming Liv and Maddie, and dropped some hints to the casting director that I really wanted to be a part of the show and get the chance to work with Zendaya."

In 2017, Royster booked a recurring role on The Fosters, Dawn, a flirtatious student who causes jealousy between Callie (Maia Mitchell) and AJ (Tom Williamson). She then starred in the short-lived YouTube Red series, Youth & Consequences, in 2018. It was announced in 2019 that Royster signed on to star in Instafame, a social media thriller, directed by Nick Everhart. In 2020, she starred in the female buddy road comedy-drama film, Unpregnant, and she recurred in the CBS sitcom, God Friended Me. She was also announced to star in Don't Log Off, a comedy-thriller set entirely during the early days of the COVID-19 quarantine; however, the film was never released.

On May 4, 2021, it was announced that Royster was cast in the Dynasty reboot, as Eva, a recurring role officially described as the "newest assistant and protégé" of Fallon Carrington (Elizabeth Gillies). The character was set to arrive later in the fourth season. On December 20, 2021, Royster made her final appearance in the season five premiere. Royster also appeared in two episodes of Jupiter's Legacy.

In 2022, Royster starred the Tubi original thriller film, A Party to Die For, and the BET+ original Christmas film, The Christmas Clapback.

== Filmography ==
=== Film ===
Year	Title	Role	Notes
2016	Mono	Christina Madison	
2019	Most Likely to Murder	Taylor	
2020	Instafame	Sasha Curtis	
2020	Unpregnant	Kaylee	
2022	A Party to Die For	Jessica	
2024	Amp House Massacre	Janelle	
TBA	Don't Log Off	Katy	

=== Television ===
Year	Title	Role	Notes	Refs
2012	This Indie Thing	Nia	Episode: "The Awful Truth"	
2012	Fred: The Show	Girl	Episode: "Spirit of the 90's"	
2012	Hollywood Heights	Remi	4 episodes	
2013	Bucket and Skinner's Epic Adventures	Jessie	Episode: "Epic Copycat"	
2013	Stevie TV	Jenny	Episode: "2.03"	
2013	The Goodwin Games	Kayla	Episode: "Happy Hour"	
2014–2016	Faking It	Brandi	6 episodes	
2014	The Mentalist	Kiley	Episode: "Blue Bird"	
2015	Liv and Maddie	Kennedy	Episode: "Repeat-A-Rooney"	
2015	Hand of God	Olga	Episode: "A Bird in Hand"	
2015	Scream Queens	Girl #2	Episode: "Mommie Dearest"	
2016–2017	Pretty Little Liars	Yvonne Phillips	Recurring role; 7 episodes	
2016–2017	K.C. Undercover	Abby Martin	Recurring role; 8 episodes	
2016–2017	Supernatural	Alicia Banes	3 episodes	
2017	The Fosters	Dawn	4 episodes	
2017	Do I Say I Do?	Whitney	Television film	
2018	Youth & Consequences	Jayne	Series regular	
2018	9-1-1	Daphne B.	Episode: "A Whole New You"	
2018	Runaways	Millennial Wendy	Episode: "Earth Angel"	
2019	Single Parents	KBS	Episode: "Summer of Miggy"	
2019	Murder in the Suburbs	Nikki Leeds	Television film	
2020	God Friended Me	Emily	4 episodes	
2020	Mile High Escorts	Ashley	Television film	
2020	NCIS: Los Angeles	Jojo Ballard	Episode: "Cash Flow"	
2021	Jupiter's Legacy	Janna Croft/Ghost Beam	Episodes: "All the Devils Are Here" and "Cover Her Face"	
2021	Dynasty	Eva	Recurring role; 8 episodes	
2022	The Christmas Clapback	Aaliyah	Television film	
2022	CSI: Vegas	Valerie Bianco	Episode: "There's the Rub"	
2024	The Really Loud House	Alexa Jordan	Episode: "The Man with the Backup Plan"	
