= Pretty Little Liars (franchise) =

American multimedia franchise

- Franchise logo
- Created by: Sara Shepard
- Original work: Pretty Little Liars (2006)
- Owners: Books: HarperCollins; Television: Warner Bros. Entertainment (Skydance)
- Years: 2006–2024

Print publications
- Books: Pretty Little Liars (book series); The Perfectionists (book series)
- Short stories: Various short stories

Films and television
- Television series: Pretty Little Liars (2010–2017); Ravenswood (2013–2014); The Perfectionists (2019); Pretty Little Liars (2022–2024)
- Web series: Pretty Dirty Secrets (2012)
- Television specials: "A Liars Guide to Rosewood"; "We Love You to DeAth"; "5 Years Forward"; "A-List Wrap Party"

Audio
- Soundtrack: Pretty Little Liars (2011)

Official website
- Pretty Little Liars book series; The Perfectionists book; 2022 television series

Pretty Little Liars is a multimedia franchise consisting of two book series, four television series and one web series. The initial novel of the same name was first published in 2006.

The first television series also entitled Pretty Little Liars began airing on ABC Family in June 2010; meanwhile, additional books continued to be published. Pretty Dirty Secrets, a web series was released on ABC Family's website in the fall of 2012 alongside the third season of Pretty Little Liars. The second series to make it to television, Ravenswood, aired on ABC Family from 2013 to 2014 and was cancelled after one season. Pretty Little Liars later ended and aired its final episode in June 2017.

The first book of The Perfectionists was released in April 2014 and a second book in 2015. A television series for The Perfectionists was developed and later reworked into a spin-off and stand-alone sequel of Pretty Little Liars with the title Pretty Little Liars: The Perfectionists, which became the third series in the franchise. It aired on Freeform from March to May 2019 and was cancelled after one season. In 2022, a fourth and final series in the franchise premiered on HBO Max and was cancelled after 2 seasons.

== Literature ==
=== Pretty Little Liars ===
Set in the fictional Rosewood, Pennsylvania, a wealthy suburb of Philadelphia, the book series follows the lives of four teenage girls whose clique falls apart after the disappearance of their queen bee leader, Alison DiLaurentis. Three years after her mysterious disappearance, the girls begin receiving intimidating messages from an anonymous character named "A", who threatens to expose their secrets, including long-forgotten ones they thought only Alison knew. Shortly after the messages begin, Alison's body is discovered buried in her yard. The books progress with the four girls trying to figure out the identity of "A" and facing many dangerous obstacles and twists as they do so.

Pretty Little Liars is a series of young adult novels by Sara Shepard. It consists of 21 books split into 4 arcs of 4 books each, the remaining 5 are made up of short stories and companion novels. The novels have appeared on The New York Times Best Seller list. The franchise has been licensed by Amazon.com's Kindle Worlds range of non-canon ebooks. An audio podcast series titled The Liars, which served as a sequel to the series and was released on Audible on June 16, 2022. The series' audiobook version was later released on February 14, 2023.

=== The Perfectionists ===
The Perfectionists is a series of young adult novels by Sara Shepard. The first book of the same name was released on October 2, 2014. The second novel, and sequel to the first, titled The Good Girls was released on June 2, 2015. Five high school girls jokingly plan the perfect murder for a boy who has hurt them in different manners. When the boy is found dead in the exact way they thought, the girls become prime suspects and start a quest to find the real murderer. A television adaption for the series had been in the works at The CW since 2013, but the rights were later sold to Freeform.

== Television ==
Five television series, including one made for web, make up the bulk of the Pretty Little Liars franchise: Pretty Little Liars (2010), Pretty Dirty Secrets, Ravenswood, Pretty Little Liars: The Perfectionists, and Pretty Little Liars (2022). The five series in total amount to 206 episodes across 12 seasons of television.

Series	Season	Episodes	Originally released			Average viewers (in millions)	Average adults (18-49)	Showrunner	Status
Series	Season	Episodes	First released	Last released	Network	Average viewers (in millions)	Average adults (18-49)	Showrunner	Status
Pretty Little Liars	1	22	June 8, 2010	March 21, 2011	ABC Family	—N/a	—N/a	I. Marlene King	Concluded
Pretty Little Liars	2	25	June 14, 2011	March 19, 2012	ABC Family	—N/a	—N/a	I. Marlene King and Oliver Goldstick	Concluded
Pretty Little Liars	3	24	June 5, 2012	March 19, 2013	ABC Family	2.59	1.1	I. Marlene King and Oliver Goldstick	Concluded
Pretty Little Liars	4	24	June 11, 2013	March 18, 2014	ABC Family	2.53	1.1	I. Marlene King and Oliver Goldstick	Concluded
Pretty Little Liars	5	25	June 10, 2014	March 24, 2015	ABC Family	2.01	0.9	I. Marlene King	Concluded
Pretty Little Liars	6	20	June 2, 2015	March 15, 2016	ABC Family; Freeform	1.72	0.8	I. Marlene King and Oliver Goldstick	Concluded
Pretty Little Liars	7	20	June 21, 2016	June 27, 2017	Freeform	1.11	0.6	I. Marlene King, Oliver Goldstick, and Charlie Craig	Concluded
Pretty Dirty Secrets	1	8	August 28, 2012	October 16, 2012	ABCFamily.com	—N/a	—N/a	Kyle Bown and Kim Turrisi	Concluded
Ravenswood	Backdoor pilot		October 22, 2013		ABC Family	3.18	0.9	I. Marlene King, Oliver Goldstick, and Joseph Dougherty	Concluded
Ravenswood	1	10	October 22, 2013	February 4, 2014	ABC Family	0.5	1.29	I. Marlene King, Oliver Goldstick, and Joseph Dougherty	Cancelled
Pretty Little Liars: The Perfectionists	1	10	March 20, 2019	May 22, 2019	Freeform	0.1	0.26	I. Marlene King and Charlie Craig	Cancelled
Pretty Little Liars	1	10	July 28, 2022	August 18, 2022	HBO Max	—N/a	—N/a	Roberto Aguirre-Sacasa and Lindsay Calhoon Bring	Cancelled
Pretty Little Liars	2	8	May 9, 2024	June 20, 2024	Max	—N/a	—N/a	Roberto Aguirre-Sacasa and Lindsay Calhoon Bring	Cancelled

=== Pretty Little Liars (2010–2017) ===
Pretty Little Liars is an American teen drama mystery thriller television series developed by I. Marlene King and is loosely based on the novel series of the same name. The series follows the lives of four high school girls whose clique falls apart after the disappearance of their leader. One year later, the estranged friends are reunited as they begin receiving messages from a mysterious figure named "A" who threatens to expose their deepest secrets. The series features an ensemble cast, headed by Troian Bellisario as Spencer Hastings, Lucy Hale as Aria Montgomery, Ashley Benson as Hanna Marin, Shay Mitchell as Emily Fields, Sasha Pieterse as Alison DiLaurentis and Janel Parrish as Mona Vanderwaal. The series premiered on June 8, 2010, on ABC Family, and ended on June 27, 2017. The ratings success of the first 10 episodes prompted the book series to be extended beyond the initial eight novels. On August 29, 2016, Freeform confirmed that the series would be ending after its seventh season in 2017. The series finale was viewed by an estimated 1.41 million viewers. It had the second-highest rating of any cable TV series that aired that night.

=== Pretty Dirty Secrets (2012) ===
Pretty Dirty Secrets is an American mystery web series from the television series Pretty Little Liars. The web series takes place between the events of the series' third season episodes, "The Lady Killer" and "This Is a Dark Ride". Set in the Rosewood Halloween Spooktacular Store, as the visitors of Rosewood prepared for Halloween.

=== Ravenswood (2013–2014) ===
Ravenswood is an American supernatural teen drama, mystery-thriller television series created by I. Marlene King, Oliver Goldstick and Joseph Dougherty. The show aired on ABC Family from October 22, 2013, until February 4, 2014. It is the first spin-off series of Pretty Little Liars and the second series in the franchise. Set in the fictional town of Ravenswood, Pennsylvania, the series follows five strangers whose lives become intertwined by a deadly curse that has plagued their town for generations. They have to dig into the town's dark past to solve the mysterious curse. Starring Nicole Gale Anderson, Tyler Blackburn, Steven Cabral, Brett Dier, Britne Oldford and Merritt Patterson. The series was cancelled due to low ratings after one season.

=== Pretty Little Liars: The Perfectionists (2019) ===
Pretty Little Liars: The Perfectionists the third series in the franchise created by I. Marlene King. The series premiered on Freeform on March 20, 2019 and was concluded on May 22, 2019. The series is a stand-alone sequel to Pretty Little Liars and was loosely based on the novel The Perfectionists by Sara Shepard. It is the second spin-off series of Pretty Little Liars, which included Sasha Pieterse and Janel Parrish reprising their roles as Alison DiLaurentis and Mona Vanderwaal, respectively. In the town of Beacon Heights, Washington, where everything seems perfect, from their top-tier college to their overachieving residents and the stress of needing to be perfect leads to the town's first murder. It stars Sofia Carson, Sydney Park, Eli Brown, Hayley Erin, Graeme Thomas King and Kelly Rutherford. Pretty Little Liars: The Perfectionists was cancelled after one season.

=== Pretty Little Liars (2022–2024) ===
Pretty Little Liars is the fourth and final series in the franchise, centered around a new cast of characters. Initially announced as a reboot, the series was later confirmed to be taking place within the existing chronology of the previous television series, while introducing new characters and storylines. The series was first announced as being in development at Warner Bros. for HBO Max in September 2020. Riverdale creator Roberto Aguirre-Sacasa and Lindsay Calhoon Bring took over as showrunners from I. Marlene King.

The premise of the series see the main characters paying for their parents' sin nearly 20 years ago. The first season, titled Original Sin, consists of 10 episodes and stars Bailee Madison, Chandler Kinney, Zaria, Malia Pyles, and Maia Reficco. A second season, titled Summer School, premiered in 2024. The series was cancelled in September 2024.

=== Cast and characters ===
List indicator

This section includes characters who have appeared in each television series.

- A green cell indicates the actor is a main cast member.
- A red cell indicates the actor is a recurring cast member.
- A light blue cell indicates the actor is a guest or special guest cast member.
- A dark gray cell indicates the actor has not participated in the respective season.

Series	Character	Appearances					Actor
Series	Character	PLL (2010)	PDS	RW	PLL: TP	PLL (2022)	Actor
Pretty Little Liars (2010)	Spencer Hastings	Main					Troian Bellisario
Pretty Little Liars (2010)	Alex Drake	Main					Troian Bellisario
Pretty Little Liars (2010)	Hanna Marin	Main		Guest			Ashley Benson
Pretty Little Liars (2010)	Ella Montgomery	Main					Holly Marie Combs
Pretty Little Liars (2010)	Aria Montgomery	Main					Lucy Hale
Pretty Little Liars (2010)	Ezra Fitz	Main					Ian Harding
Pretty Little Liars (2010)	Maya St. Germain	Main					Bianca Lawson
Pretty Little Liars (2010)	Ashley Marin	Main					Laura Leighton
Pretty Little Liars (2010)	Emily Fields	Main					Shay Mitchell
Pretty Little Liars (2010)	Pam Fields	Main					Nia Peeples
Pretty Little Liars (2010)	Alison DiLaurentis	Main			Main		Sasha Pieterse
Pretty Little Liars (2010)	Caleb Rivers	Main		Main			Tyler Blackburn
Pretty Little Liars (2010)	Mona Vanderwaal	Main			Main		Janel Parrish
Pretty Little Liars (2010)	Jessica DiLaurentis	Main					Andrea Parker
Pretty Little Liars (2010)	Mary Drake	Main					Andrea Parker
Pretty Dirty Secrets	Shana Fring	Recurring	Main				Aeriél Miranda
Pretty Dirty Secrets	Jason DiLaurentis	Recurring	Main				Drew Van Acker
Pretty Dirty Secrets	Charlotte Drake	Recurring	Main				Vanessa Ray
Pretty Dirty Secrets	Noel Kahn	Recurring	Main				Brant Daugherty
Pretty Dirty Secrets	Garrett Reynolds	Recurring	Main				Yani Gellman
Pretty Dirty Secrets	Lucas Gottesman	Recurring	Main				Brendan Robinson
Ravenswood	Miranda Collins	Guest		Main			Nicole Gale Anderson
Ravenswood	Caleb Rivers	Main		Main			Tyler Blackburn
Ravenswood	Raymond Collins	Guest (Note: In the Pretty Little Liars Halloween episode "Grave New World", Collins was portrayed by Vince Lasaliva. In Ravenswood, he was later played by Cabral in the role.)		Main			Steven Cabral
Ravenswood	Luke Matheson	Guest		Main			Brett Dier
Ravenswood	Remy Beaumont			Main			Britne Oldford
Ravenswood	Dillon Sanders			Main			Luke Benward
Ravenswood	Olivia Matheson			Main			Merritt Patterson
Pretty Little Liars: The Perfectionists	Alison DiLaurentis	Main			Main		Sasha Pieterse
Pretty Little Liars: The Perfectionists	Mona Vanderwaal	Main			Main		Janel Parrish
Pretty Little Liars: The Perfectionists	Ava Jalali				Main		Sofia Carson
Pretty Little Liars: The Perfectionists	Caitlin Park-Lewis				Main		Sydney Park
Pretty Little Liars: The Perfectionists	Dylan Walker				Main		Eli Brown
Pretty Little Liars: The Perfectionists	Taylor Hotchkiss				Main		Hayley Erin
Pretty Little Liars: The Perfectionists	Jeremy Beckett				Main		Graeme Thomas King
Pretty Little Liars: The Perfectionists	Claire Hotchkiss				Main		Kelly Rutherford
Pretty Little Liars (2022)	Imogen Adams					Main	Bailee Madison
Pretty Little Liars (2022)	Tabby Haworthe					Main	Chandler Kinney
Pretty Little Liars (2022)	Faran Bryant					Main	Zaria
Pretty Little Liars (2022)	Minnie "Mouse" Honrada					Main	Malia Pyles
Pretty Little Liars (2022)	Noa Olivar					Main	Maia Reficco
Pretty Little Liars (2022)	Karen Beasley					Main	Mallory Bechtel
Pretty Little Liars (2022)	Kelly Beasley					Main	Mallory Bechtel
Pretty Little Liars (2022)	Sidney Haworthe					Main	Sharon Leal
Pretty Little Liars (2022)	Marjorie Olivar					Main	Elena Goode
Pretty Little Liars (2022)	Sheriff Beasley					Main	Eric Johnson
Pretty Little Liars (2022)	Shawn Noble					Main	Alex Aiono
Pretty Little Liars (2022)	Elodie Honrada					Main	Lea Salonga

== International adaptations ==
Country	Local title	Network	Original release	Notes
India	Best Friends Forever?	Channel V India	December 3, 2012 – May 25, 2013	Non-official adaptation
Turkey	Tatlı Küçük Yalancılar	Star TV	July 6, 2015 – October 3, 2015	
Indonesia	Best Friends Forever	Trans TV	August 7–27, 2017	Non-official adaptation
Indonesia	Pretty Little Liars	Viu	April 22, 2020 – May 18, 2022	
