= The Perfectionists =

The Perfectionists may refer to:

- The Perfectionists (book series), a book series of young-adult novels written by Sara Shepard
- Pretty Little Liars: The Perfectionists, an American television series based on the books and spin-off of Pretty Little Liars

== See also ==
- The Perfectionist, a 1981 play by David Williamson, and 1985 film based on the play
