= Pretty Dirty Secrets =

American teen drama web series

- Genre: Mystery
- Based on: Pretty Little Liars by Sara Shepard
- Written by: Kyle Bown & Kim Turrisi
- Directed by: Arthur Anderson
- Starring: Aeriél Miranda; Drew Van Acker; Vanessa Ray; Brant Daugherty; Yani Gellman; Brendan Robinson
- Music by: Michael Suby
- Country of origin: United States
- Original language: English
- No. of seasons: 1
- No. of episodes: 8

Production
- Running time: 2–3 minutes

Original release
- Network: ABCFamily.com
- Release: August 28 – October 16, 2012

Related
- Pretty Little Liars franchise

Pretty Dirty Secrets is an American mystery web series from the television series Pretty Little Liars. The web series is part of the Pretty Little Liars franchise and takes place between the events of the series' third season episodes, "The Lady Killer" and "This Is a Dark Ride". Set in the Rosewood Halloween Spooktacular Store, as the visitors of Rosewood prepared for Halloween.

== Production ==
The web series was written by Kyle Bown & Kim Turrisi and directed by Arthur Anderson. Kyle Bown, the assistant to Pretty Little Liars showrunner I. Marlene King, and Kim Turrisi, who is not part of the writing staff, were hired to write the web series by ABC Family, however the crew behind Pretty Little Liars was also used with the web series. The web series introduced Aeriél Miranda as Shana in the television series. None of the series regulars from Pretty Little Liars appears in the web series.

=== Release ===
The episodes would become available each Tuesday on ABC Family's website from August 28, 2012, after the summer finale of the third season, as a way to tide viewers over until the Halloween special. The eighth and final episode was released on October 16, 2012.

== Cast and characters ==
Cast members from Pretty Little Liars appearing in the web series:

- Aeriél Miranda as Shana Fring (5 episodes)
- Drew Van Acker as Jason DiLaurentis (Episode: "A Reunion")
- Vanessa Ray as CeCe Drake (Episode: "A Reunion")
- Brant Daugherty as Noel Kahn (Episode: "I'm a Free Man")
- Yani Gellman as Garrett Reynolds (Episode: "I'm a Free Man")
- Brendan Robinson as Lucas Gottesman (Episode: "Trade Off")

== Episodes ==
No.	Title	Directed by	Written by	Original release date
1	"A ReservAtion"	Arthur Anderson	Kyle Bown & Kim Turrisi	August 28, 2012
"A" leaves a message on the Rosewood Halloween Spooktacular Store's answering machine about their reservation. Starring: Jennifer Cain as Voicemail Message
2	"A Reunion"	Arthur Anderson	Kyle Bown & Kim Turrisi	September 4, 2012
CeCe and Jason have an argument about Alison at the Rosewood Halloween Spooktacular Store while Shana listens to their conversation. Starring: Drew Van Acker as Jason DiLaurentis, Vanessa Ray as CeCe Drake and Aeriel Miranda as Shana Fring
3	"A VoicemAil"	Arthur Anderson	Kyle Bown & Kim Turrisi	September 11, 2012
As Mrs. Reynolds listens to her voicemail messages we learn that Garrett and Mrs. Reynolds are planning on leaving Rosewood and "A" leaves a creepy voicemail message. Starring: Yani Gellman as Garrett Reynolds (voiceover) and Jennifer Cain as Voicemail Message
4	"I'm A Free MAn"	Arthur Anderson	Kyle Bown & Kim Turrisi	September 18, 2012
While shopping at the Halloween Spooktacular Store, Noel starts flirting with Shana. Noel and Garrett come face to face and start arguing about Jenna and how she chose Noel. Meanwhile, Shana overhears their conversation and calls someone. While Noel and Garrett are arguing, a mysterious woman wearing a costume comes out of the dressing room and stares at them. After Garrett leaves, Shana calls someone and suspiciously says, "You'll never guess what just went down in here". Starring: Brant Daugherty as Noel Kahn, Yani Gellman as Garrett Reynolds and Aeriel Miranda as Shana Fring
5	"TrAde Off"	Arthur Anderson	Kyle Bown & Kim Turrisi	September 25, 2012
Lucas comes into the Halloween Spooktacular Store where he meets Shana who is reading one of his favorite comic books. Later, Lucas gets a mysterious phone call. Right after he gets off the phone, a mysterious person in a costume comes up behind him and whispers something in his ear before going into the dressing room. Lucas follows it inside where he is handed a piece of paper. After reading the note, he gives the costume person an envelope. Shana sees this and says to herself "never a dull moment". Starring: Brendan Robinson as Lucas Gottesman and Aeriel Miranda as Shana Fring
6	"AssociAtion"	Arthur Anderson	Kyle Bown & Kim Turrisi	October 2, 2012
Shana scrolls through her phone and as she does we see many texts from a blocked ID. The blocked ID also calls Shana meaning that Shana is associated with someone. One of the calls received by the blocked ID was from New York. Starring: Aeriel Miranda as Shana Fring
7	"CAll Security"	Arthur Anderson	Kyle Bown & Kim Turrisi	October 9, 2012
"A" copies some of the security footage from the Halloween store onto a USB stick and watches the footage. The hooded figure pauses the video when someone wearing a red coat is shown walking. Then "A" deletes all the footage from the computer. Starring: Aeriel Miranda as Shana Fring, "A" and Jackson McQueen as security
8	"The 'A' TrAin"	Arthur Anderson	Kyle Bown & Kim Turrisi	October 16, 2012
"A" is studying the map for the Ghost Train Party, looking over their plan.
