= Pretty Little Liars: The Perfectionists =

American teen mystery-thriller drama television series

- Genre: Mystery
- Created by: I. Marlene King
- Based on: The Perfectionists and Pretty Little Liars by Sara Shepard
- Starring: Sasha Pieterse; Janel Parrish; Sofia Carson; Sydney Park; Eli Brown; Hayley Erin; Graeme Thomas King; Kelly Rutherford
- Opening theme: "Secret" by Denmark + Winter
- Composer: Michael Suby
- Country of origin: United States
- Original language: English
- No. of seasons: 1
- No. of episodes: 10

Production
- Executive producers: Joseph Dougherty; Charlie Craig; Gina Girolamo; Leslie Morgenstein; I. Marlene King; Elizabeth Allen Rosenbaum (pilot); Lisa Cochran-Neilan (pilot)
- Production location: Portland, Oregon
- Cinematography: Larry Reibman
- Editors: Lois Blumenthal; Richard Currie; Melissa Gearhart; Robert Lattanzio; Ciaran Michael Vejby
- Camera setup: Single-camera
- Running time: 41–43 minutes
- Production companies: Alloy Entertainment; Long Lake Productions; Warner Horizon Television

Original release
- Network: Freeform
- Release: March 20 – May 22, 2019

Related
- Pretty Little Liars franchise

Pretty Little Liars: The Perfectionists is an American mystery television series created by I. Marlene King. The series is the third television series on the franchise. The series is loosely based on the 2014 novel The Perfectionists by Sara Shepard, but serves as a spin-off and standalone-sequel to Pretty Little Liars. The show premiered on Freeform on March 20, 2019 and concluded on May 22, 2019.

The series features Sofia Carson as Ava Jalali, Sydney Park as Caitlin Park-Lewis, and Eli Brown as Dylan Walker. Sasha Pieterse and Janel Parrish reprise their roles from the original series as Alison DiLaurentis and Mona Vanderwaal.

In September 2019, the series was canceled after one season.

== Plot ==
In a town of Beacon Heights, Oregon, where everything seems perfect, from their top-tier college to their overachieving residents and the stress of needing to be perfect leads to the town's first murder.

== Cast and characters ==
=== Main ===
- Sasha Pieterse as Alison DiLaurentis, a new TA at Beacon Heights University (BHU) who is recently separated from her wife Emily Fields
- Janel Parrish as Mona Vanderwaal, the head of recruitment and admissions at BHU who selected Alison
- Sofia Carson as Ava Jalali, a fashionable trendsetter and designer with a talent for hacking and coding
- Sydney Park as Caitlin Park-Lewis, the intelligent daughter of two overachieving mothers
- Eli Brown as Dylan Walker, a talented cellist who is extremely critical of himself
- Hayley Erin as Taylor Hotchkiss, Nolan's sister, who was a teacher at BHU before faking her death
- Graeme Thomas King as Jeremy Beckett, a charming and witty Brit and Caitlin's secret boyfriend
- Kelly Rutherford as Claire Hotchkiss, Taylor and Nolan's mother and founder of Hotchkiss Technologies

=== Recurring ===
- Evan Bittencourt as Andrew Villareal
- Noah Gray-Cabey as Mason Gregory, Nolan's childhood friend and Caitlin's ex-boyfriend
- Klea Scott as Dana Booker, a former FBI agent and new head of security at BHU
- Garrett Wareing as Zach Fortson, Ava's friend who later becomes her boyfriend

=== Guest ===
- Chris Mason as Nolan Hotchkiss, a born leader and heir to the Hotchkiss empire
- Duffy Epstein as Ray Hogadorn, an employee at BHU
- Phillip Rhys as Michael Jalali, Ava's fugitive father
- Cycerli Ash as Senator Park-Lewis, one of Caitlin's two mothers

== Production ==
=== Development ===
In November 2014, I. Marlene King was announced to adapt a screenplay for Sara Shepard's novel series The Perfectionists, as the television series. It was later reworked as a sequel of the television show Pretty Little Liars. On September 25, 2017, Freeform ordered a pilot for the series titled Pretty Little Liars: The Perfectionists and the second spin-off series following Ravenswood. On May 14, 2018, the network picked up the series for a 10-episode season, set to air in 2019. I. Marlene King wrote and Elizabeth Allen Rosenbaum directed the first two episodes, which are titled "Pilot" and "Sex, Lies and Alibis". On February 5, 2019, it was announced that the series would premiere on March 20, 2019. On September 27, 2019, Freeform canceled the series after one season.

=== Casting ===
On September 25, 2017, Freeform announced that Sasha Pieterse and Janel Parrish had been cast to reprise their roles as Alison DiLaurentis and Mona Vanderwaal, respectively. On January 29, 2018, it was announced that Sofia Carson had been cast in the role of Ava, one of the series' protagonists.

On March 9, 2018, Deadline Hollywood reported that Kelly Rutherford would be playing Claire Hotchkiss. It was also announced that Sydney Park as Caitlin Park-Lewis, Eli Brown as Dylan Walker, Noah Gray-Cabey as Mason Gregory and Klea Scott as Dana Booker. General Hospital star Hayley Erin was cast in a "mysterious, unnamed role", which later proved to be Taylor Hotchkiss.

=== Filming ===
On January 23, 2018, it was announced that the series would be filmed in Portland, Oregon. King confirmed on Twitter that filming would start in March 2018. Production started on February 27, 2018, with a table read for the pilot. Filming for the pilot started on March 12, 2018, and wrapped in the last week of the same month. Filming spanned October 17, 2018 – January 23, 2019.

=== Music ===
On May 19, 2018, Michael Suby was announced to compose the series, having previously scored both Pretty Little Liars and Ravenswood. A version of The Pierces' song "Secret", from Pretty Little Liars was performed by Denmark + Winter, serving as the series' theme song. It was released by WaterTower Music on March 22, 2019. It is featured music from musical group Vitamin String Quartet for each of the series episodes including Coldplay's "Clocks" and Lady Gaga's "Poker Face" and "Just Dance".

== Episodes ==
No.	Title	Directed by	Written by	Original release date	Prod. code	U.S. viewers (millions)
1	"Pilot"	Elizabeth Allen Rosenbaum	Teleplay and television story by : I. Marlene King	March 20, 2019	U11.10050	0.46
Alison DiLaurentis moves to Beacon Heights to begin a job as a teaching assistant at Beacon Heights University (BHU). She is startled by frenemy Mona Vanderwaal. Mona shows Alison around and she learns that Taylor Hotchkiss killed herself a year ago. After class Nolan asks Dylan to continue their deal from last year in which he writes all of his and Ava's homework essays. Alison begins suspecting plagiarism between Ava, Nolan, and Dylan. Alison questions Dylan about the papers and gives him the option of having twenty-four hours to tell the truth or be expelled. Nolan visits a cabin and it is revealed that Taylor is not dead. The two are working together to stop "Beacon Guard", the school's security system. Caitlin, Ava, and Dylan all meet in the woods and decide that they're all tired of Nolan and joke about murdering him. Alison rips wallpaper off the wall to find the words "They're Watching" on the wall. Nolan meets a mysterious figure on the roof in an attempt to get them to help his and Taylor's cause. Alison hears sirens and goes outside and finds Nolan impaled on a fence. Caitlin, Ava, and Dylan realize that he was murdered.
2	"Sex, Lies and Alibis"	Elizabeth Allen Rosenbaum	I. Marlene King	March 27, 2019	U13.13402	0.24
Caitlin and Dylan begin panicking due to Nolan being murdered in the same way as their fantasy. In addition, neither of them have heard from Ava who seems to be missing. Mona feels responsible for Nolan's death and begins putting the pieces together. Caitlin and Dylan find Ava in her room and the two convince her that they all need to stick together. Following the funeral Caitlin, Dylan, and Ava run into Dana Booker, a former FBI agent now head of security at BHU, who assures them that she will find the person responsible for Nolan's murder. In the campus greenhouse Dylan finds a note where Nolan's stash was, leading him to believe that someone beat him to the stash. Alison meets with Dana who requests to read the essays she assigned just before Nolan's death. Mona calls Hanna Marin who informs her that Spencer and Toby have eloped since Mona left Rosewood. Dana interrupts Alison's class and requests to see Caitlin, Dylan, and Ava. Dana asks the three of them where they were the night of Nolan's murder but before they can answer Alison interrupts the interview and gives them an alibi.
3	"...If One of Them is Dead"	Geary McLeod	Charlie Craig	April 3, 2019	U13.13403	0.29
Alison along with Caitlin, Dylan, and Ava begin putting the details of their alibi together. While trying to find out information about Nolan's murder Mona is locked out of Beacon Guard's system. During class, Mason takes Nolan's former seat which leads to an altercation between Mason and Ava. Ava runs out of class and Caitlin attempts to catch up to her. Caitlin is interrupted and questioned by Dana. Mona learns that the suspicious activity on her account came from one single source and she assumes that someone is trying to frame her. Ava admits to Caitlin and Dylan that the night Nolan died she followed him out to a mysterious cabin in the woods. The three of them visit the cabin and begin searching it. They are interrupted by Alison and Ava tells her that the night Nolan died she followed him out there and that he met a blonde woman who looked similar to Alison. Alison visits Mona and tells Mona her theory of Taylor being alive.
4	"The Ghost Sonata"	Roger Kumble	Joseph Dougherty	April 10, 2019	U13.13404	0.31
Alison is convinced that Taylor Hotchkiss is alive but Mona doesn't believe her theory. Ava, Caitlin and Dylan become further suspicious of Mason when he begins acting similar to Nolan before his murder; Mona hacks into the Beacon Guard system and finds a mysterious name "Ray Hogadorn" along with Alison and Caitlin's names. Dana begins cracking down on the Perfectionists as well as Claire who suspects Caitlin after she is lied towards about their whereabouts when Nolan was murdered. Following Alison's advice to share secrets, Dylan confesses to Andrew about Nolan and when Caitlin is blackmailed by Mason, she confesses to Ava that she leaked Ava's identity to BHU as well as her criminal father. Mona attempts to track down Ray but is trapped inside a room full of articles about Nolan and Taylor's deaths by the latter, Alison uses Taylor's books to track her down to find a trailer in the woods. While exploring, Taylor appears and locks her inside before driving off.
5	"The Patchwork Girl"	Roger Kumble	Joseph Dougherty	April 17, 2019	U13.13405	0.22
Taylor drives the trailer away with Alison still trapped inside. Mona begins questioning Ray Hogadorn and starts learning things about him. Ava comes up with a plan to drug Mason and pitches it to Caitlin and Dylan. Mona finds out that Ray was the one who wrote "They're watching" on Alison's wall. Caitlin tricks Mason into agreeing to go out to a cabin with her. Taylor tells Alison that it isn't safe for her because someone is trying to kill her. While Ava is planning the fashion show she finds a slide in the projector of Dylan having sex. Ava, Caitlin, and Dylan debate whether drugging Mason is the best way to do things. Dana questions Mona about her and Alison's past including Alex and Mary Drake. Alison takes Taylor back to her house which used to be Taylor's. Caitlin waits to meet Mason at the cabin. When he does she drugs his drink but he refuses to drink it. While Mason is building a fire Caitlin sneaks up behind him and knocks him out. Caitlin and Dylan are waiting to meet Ava but Caitlin is run over by a car just as Alison finds out that Taylor escaped.
6	"Lost and Found"	Shiri Appleby	Kyle Bown	April 24, 2019	U13.13406	0.24
7	"Dead Week"	Arlene Sanford	Paula Yoo	May 1, 2019	U13.13407	0.17
8	"Hook, Line and Booker"	Arlene Sanford	Nelson Soler	May 8, 2019	U13.13408	0.20
9	"Lie Together, Die Together"	Norman Buckley	Charlie Craig & Kateland Brown	May 15, 2019	U13.13409	0.21
10	"Enter the Professor"	Norman Buckley	I. Marlene King & Kyle Bown	May 22, 2019	U13.13410	0.27

== Release ==
=== Marketing ===
A tie-in book edition was based on the series set in the Pretty Little Liars universe. The book was written by Sara Shepard, and released by HarperCollins on May 28, 2019.

== Reception ==
=== Critical response ===
Pretty Little Liars: The Perfectionists was met with widespread acclaim from critics, achieving a rating above all seasons of the parent series. On review aggregator Rotten Tomatoes, the series holds an approval rating of 100% based on 11 reviews, with an average rating of 7.87/10. The site's consensus reads: "Visually intriguing and deliciously provocative, Pretty Little Liars: The Perfectionists effectively pays homage to its soapy forebear".

=== Ratings ===
Viewership and ratings per episode of Pretty Little Liars: The Perfectionists
No.	Title	Air date	Rating (18–49)	Viewers (millions)	DVR (18–49)	DVR viewers (millions)	Total (18–49)	Total viewers (millions)
1	"Pilot"	March 20, 2019	0.2	0.46	0.2	0.38	0.4	0.84
2	"Sex, Lies and Alibis"	March 27, 2019	0.1	0.24	0.2	0.35	0.3	0.59
3	"...If One of Them is Dead"	April 3, 2019	0.1	0.29	—N/a	—N/a	—N/a	—N/a
4	"The Ghost Sonata"	April 10, 2019	0.1	0.31	0.2	0.34	0.3	0.65
5	"The Patchwork Girl"	April 17, 2019	0.1	0.22	0.2	0.34	0.3	0.55
6	"Lost and Found"	April 24, 2019	0.1	0.24	—N/a	0.25	—N/a	0.50
7	"Dead Week"	May 1, 2019	0.1	0.17	—N/a	0.31	—N/a	0.48
8	"Hook, Line and Booker"	May 8, 2019	0.1	0.20	—N/a	0.31	—N/a	0.51
9	"Lie Together, Die Together"	May 15, 2019	0.1	0.21	—N/a	0.32	—N/a	0.53
10	"Enter the Professor"	May 22, 2019	0.1	0.27	—N/a	0.24	—N/a	0.51

=== Awards and nominations ===
Year	Award	Category	Nominee(s)	Result	Ref.
2019	Teen Choice Awards	Choice Drama TV Show	Pretty Little Liars: The Perfectionists	Nominated	
2019	Teen Choice Awards	Choice Drama TV Actress	Sofia Carson	Nominated	
