= The Lying Game (novel series) =

Book series by Sara Shepard

- The Lying Game (2010); Never Have I Ever (2011); Two Truths and a Lie (2012); Hide and Seek (2012); Cross My Heart, Hope to Die (2013); Seven Minutes in Heaven (2013)
- Author: Sara Shepard
- Country: United States
- Genre: Young adult Mystery
- Publisher: HarperCollins
- Published: December 7, 2010 – July 30, 2013
- No. of books: 6

The Lying Game is a series of young adult novels by Sara Shepard published by HarperTeen. The first novel in the series, The Lying Game, was released in hardcover on December 7, 2010. The series follows a teenager, Emma Paxton, who assumes the identity of her long-lost twin, Sutton Mercer, to uncover her sister’s killer.

A television series adaptation was loosely based on the books debuted on ABC Family in 2011.The series is cancelled after two seasons.

== Publication history ==
=== Original series ===
1. The Lying Game (published December 7, 2010)
2. Never Have I Ever (published August 2, 2011)
3. Two Truths and a Lie (published February 7, 2012)
4. Hide and Seek (published July 31, 2012)
5. Cross My Heart, Hope to Die (published February 5, 2013)
6. Seven Minutes in Heaven (published July 30, 2013)

=== Prequel series ===
1. The First Lie (published December 18, 2012)
2. True Lies (published June 4, 2013)

== Characters ==
While the novel and the television series share most of the same characters, there are differences in regards to the characters between the two (with the biggest difference being that Sutton is deceased in the books, but alive in the television series):

- Sutton Mercer – The deceased protagonist of the story. While alive, she was a snobby trouble-maker who believed she could do anything. Sutton was adopted by a wealthy family, but took everything she had for granted. She is also the founder of "The Lying Game". Like her twin, she has brown hair and blue eyes.
- Emma Paxton – The main character, and the identical sister of Sutton. She has a kind heart, and has always wished she had a better life. Emma went into foster care after Becky, her birth mother, abandoned her. Like her twin, she has brown hair and blue eyes.
- Ethan Landry – A mysterious and loner boy who is befriended by Emma. After learning the truth about the twins, he tries his best to help Emma whenever he can. Over time, he grows close to Emma and develops feelings for her and the killer of Sutton because he was in love with her.
- Madeline Vega – One of Sutton's best friends. She's a ballerina and is another member of The Lying Game. She has an abusive father and it's hinted that he's the reason her younger brother, Thayer, went missing.
- Charlotte Chamberlain – One of Sutton's best friends. A member of The Lying Game. She has a rich family and it's hinted that her father is cheating on her mother.
- Laurel Mercer – Sutton's adoptive sister, and the only biological child of Sutton's adoptive parents. Also, Thayer's best friend. She was the last member of The Lying Game included.
- Nisha Banerjee – Sutton's tennis rival.
- Ted and Kristin Mercer – Sutton's adoptive parents who kick Emma out of the house once they find out she is impersonating Sutton.
