= First Love (2022 film) =

- Directed by: A. J. Edwards
- Written by: A. J. Edwards
- Produced by: A. J. Edwards; Henry Kittredge; Lucas Jarach; Nadine de Barros
- Starring: Diane Kruger; Hero Fiennes Tiffin; Sydney Park; Jeffrey Donovan
- Music by: George Kallis
- Production company: Voltage Pictures
- Distributed by: Vertical Entertainment
- Release date: June 17, 2022
- Running time: 96 minutes
- Country: United States
- Language: English
- Box office: $247,988 (Russia and CIS)

First Love is a 2022 American romance film written and directed by A. J. Edwards and starring Diane Kruger, Hero Fiennes Tiffin, Sydney Park and Jeffrey Donovan.

The story follows how Jim and Ann meet, lose contact and their lives eventually join.

The film was released on June 17, 2022 in the United States.

== Plot ==
Due to the great economic recession starting in 2008, senior high school student Jim Albright's father Greg loses his bank job. Jim lets him know he's going to try to apply to colleges where he might be able to get at least part of a ride for track.

Discovering he has only 20 minutes to write a paper for a class, Jim holes himself into the school library to finish it. There, as he is seeking a book, he sees fellow senior Ann on the other side of the bookcase and is captivated. Jim later watches her rehearsing a theatrical play in the auditorium.

Taking Ann out of her Spanish class with a false note from a school administrator, Jim confesses he faked the summons so as to talk to her alone. Shy, and not sharing any classes with Ann, he explains he just wanted to talk to her alone briefly. Jim compliments her on her eyes.

After school, Ann asks Jim for a ride. Rather than take her right home, he takes her to a pretty spot overlooking the ocean and they hang out. As she arrives home later than normal, Ann's mom asks her why. When Ann tells her he's someone new, she assumes she's dating around and approves.

Greg meets with an employment recruiter across town, while Kay deals with her Aunt Irene's carer challenges. She doesn't keep them for long, so Kay suggests a home, which goes over badly. Irene reminds her that she practically raised her as her own as her sister essentially abandoned her, then throws her out.

That night Kay's brother, after bragging about how busy he and his wife are, openly criticizes Greg. A blue-collar worker, he implies that the white-collar, former banker's layoff was deserved.

At Ann's birthday party, when playing a dare game, Jim is one of three people tasked to kiss her blindfolded so she can rate them. Ann gives him a ten. Chatting with her friends at school later, they all say he's weird but she admits she likes him.

Jim and Ann's relationship progresses...he has her over for dinner with his parents. While they are out in the afternoon with friends and colleagues on their 21st anniversary, the young couple is intimate. Afterwards Jim declares his love.

Over dinner with her mom, Ann's mom suggests the connection with Jim ought to be fleeting, as she should be a free agent in college. This influences her next interaction with him. Ann tells him she's going to college in NYC, while Jim's staying in California. He suggests they play things by ear, but she suggests they 'keep it light'.

Jim and Ann stop spending time together, and she becomes distant. Time passes, they graduate and his grandmother passes. Before Jim heads to UCLA, he is told his parents are downsizing as Greg still is unemployed and they cannot get another bank extension. When he asks his dad for advice on Ann, he says if it is meant to be it will be.

Two years later, Jim visits his parents' apartment. Greg does odd jobs here and there to help with their expenses. Kay confides in Jim that they are both feeling low and cries on his shoulder.

Ann sends Jim a voicemail, expressing interest in meeting up. When they do, they both confirm the other is free, learn that neither has another meaningful relationship so are together intimately again. Afterwards, Ann confesses she loves Jim, has always loved him and asks what next.

After Jim has a minor health care scare, he gets Ann an engagement ring. When Kay finds it, she tries to dissuade him, unsuccessfully. Jim approaches Ann's mom, telling of his intention to propose at her graduation. Although she's skeptical, she sees he is serious. Meanwhile, Greg successfully interviews for a Phoenix company, just he is contemplating moving them abroad.

The film ends with Jim and Ann's simple wedding and reception, with Greg urging them to hold on to their most important moments.

== Cast ==
- Hero Fiennes Tiffin as Jim
- Sydney Park as Ann
- Diane Kruger as Kay Albright
- Jeffrey Donovan as Greg Albright
- Blake Weise as Nick
- Diane Venora as Aunt Irene
- Nikolai Tsankov as Father Alex
- Harrison Cone as Tol
- Elena Heuzé as Kim
- Chris Galust as Nick Albright
- Bruce Wexler as Vance Hughes
- Kiara T. Romero as Liz
- Dominique Gayle as Natalie
- Makeba Pace as Sonia
- Stephen Singleton as Kris
- Nanrisa Lee as Senior Manager

== Production ==
In May 2021, it was announced that filming occurred in Los Angeles.

The film's score was originally composed by Richard Reed Parry, but it was replaced with a score by George Kallis.

== Release ==
The film was released in the United States on June 17, 2022 in theaters and on demand. The film was also released in South Africa on June 24, 2022.

== Reception ==
The film has a 33% rating on Rotten Tomatoes based on six reviews.

Matt Zoller Seitz of RogerEbert.com awarded the film two and a half stars and wrote, "The untapped potential here is considerable, though the cinematography and performances ensure that the film remains watchable."
