= The F**k-It List =

2020 film by Michael Duggan

- Release poster
- Directed by: Michael Duggan
- Written by: Michael Duggan; Dan McDermott
- Produced by: Michael Duggan; Dan McDermott; Matthew Signer
- Starring: Eli Brown; Madison Iseman; Jerry O'Connell; Karan Brar; Tristan Lake Leabu
- Cinematography: Christopher Hamilton
- Edited by: Bruce Green
- Music by: Jimmy LaValle
- Production companies: Awesomeness Films; Paramount Pictures
- Distributed by: Netflix
- Release date: July 1, 2020
- Running time: 103 minutes
- Country: United States
- Language: English

The F**k-It List is a 2020 American coming-of-age comedy-drama film co-written and directed by Michael Duggan in his feature directorial debut.

The film follows a straight-laced high school senior (Eli Brown) whose involvement in a prank-related accident realigns his life, which is compounded when he creates a version of a bucket list about a life he wished he had lived beyond chasing grades and college acceptances.

The film was released on Netflix on July 1, 2020, and was removed from the UK service on April 1, 2023.

== Plot ==
Brett Blackmore's pushy parents are excitedly celebrating his acceptance into seven out of eight Ivy League schools (including bragging to their friends, his high school, the local paper) with Harvard being the only one he is wait-listed for. When he joins his friends Nico, Clint, Les and Stacy in playing a benign senior prank, they accidentally cause a school building to blow up. He is the only one identified on the security cameras and, as a result, he loses his college acceptances.

After sharing a brief kiss with Kayla (interrupted by the brash Ted), Brett records a video ranting about being forced down a path he did not choose, including a "fuck-it list" of things he wishes he had done, had he not been scared it would affect his future. He posts it to his friendship group but accidentally posts it publicly. It goes viral on a small scale (1000+ views overnight). His parents scheme to get him accepted by Harvard, including making advances to their friend Barry who is a board member there.

Kayla appreciates Brett's list and says that she needs his help to start checking items off of the one she has made as a result. This involves smashing the expensive Mustang belonging to her mother's alcoholic and abusive partner, which she says she never had the guts to do before Brett's post. The mother's partner spots them and they drive off and spend the day together. They discuss their mutual lists and Brett performs "Wild Thing" in public on Venice Beach. Kayla is signed to Ted's father's modeling agency, where she will be working in Europe over the summer to afford school, but the arrangement also means she has to entertain the annoying Ted.

Kayla reveals she has nowhere to go after smashing the car, but Brett is reluctant to help her. She storms off but later posts a good-luck message to him. In the meantime, his list continues to gain traction online, which adversely affects his meeting with the principal, resulting in his ineligibility to graduate high school.

Brett's parents berate him so he drives off in his father's car to the Rocks to meet his friends. They spread the word and a large number of other teens turn up to burn their school books together. The fire attracts attention for the list and he is called by a PR representative who wants to help him monetize it. The police turn up to reveal he could be considered to be inciting crime.

The dean of Harvard calls Brett through Barry to offer him a place as an iconoclast and disruptor. Meanwhile, Kayla finally agrees to see him and they make up. Brett has to write an essay to gain entry to Harvard, but he seems uninspired by it. He drops in on his friends' graduation to learn that Kayla's mother's boyfriend pressed charges for smashing up his car.

Upon learning from Les that the homeless Dee was previously a valedictorian, he turns his Harvard essay into a new rant about the education system and success, rejecting them. His mother opens up to him, apologizing for pushing him and saying that they are on board with his decisions. Brett hits three million followers and Harvard says they loved his essay, offering him a place.

Shortly afterward, Kayla is told that in order to work in the 'modeling industry', she will need to 'attend to' sometimes lecherous, rich clients. Brett arrives in Spain to persuade her to travel with him instead (after rejecting Harvard again) which she is happy to do. Brett tells Kayla that he was offered a visiting professorship at Harvard.

== Cast ==
- Eli Brown as Brett Blackmore
- Madison Iseman as Kayla Pierce
- Jerry O'Connell as Jeffrey Blackmore, Brett's father
- Natalie Zea as Kristen Blackmore, Brett's mother
- Karan Brar as Nico Gomes
- Marcus Scribner as Clint
- Tristan Lake Leabu as Les
- Peter Facinelli as Barry Brooks
- King Bach as Jasper Zim

== Production ==
Production began in 2018 by Awesomeness Films. It was Michael Duggan's directorial debut, though he had been writing and producing in the industry for several years.

== Reception ==
Inkoo Kang from The Hollywood Reporter criticized the film for being tone deaf and unrealistic.
