= Alison DiLaurentis =

Fictional character in the Pretty Little Liars book series

- Pretty Little Liars character
- Alison Lauren DiLaurentis as portrayed by Sasha Pieterse on the television series of the same name.
- First appearance: Pretty Little Liars (2006)
- Created by: Sara Shepard
- Portrayed by: Sasha Pieterse; Isabella Rice (young)
- Voiced by: Cassandra Morris (Pretty Little Liars–Wanted)
- Adapted by: I. Marlene King

In-universe information
- Full name: Alison Lauren DiLaurentis
- Aliases: Novels: "A"; Maxine Peptwell; Tiffany Day; Kyla Kennedy; Television: Vivian Darkbloom; Marnie Winter; Rebecca Kelly; Holly Varjak; Alison Rollins
- Nicknames: Ali; The Queen of Mean; Queen Bee; Red Coat; The Master Manipulator; Master Puppeteer
- Occupation: "A" (novel-only); English teacher at Rosewood Day School (television-only) (formerly); Teaching assistant at Beacon Heights University (currently)
- Affiliation: The Liars
- Family: Novels: Jessica DiLaurentis (mother); Kenneth DiLaurentis (adoptive father); Jason DiLaurentis (maternal half-brother); Courtney Day-DiLaurentis (identical twin sister); Peter Hastings (biological father); Spencer Hastings (paternal half-sister); Melissa Hastings (paternal half-sister); Television: Kenneth DiLaurentis (father); Jessica Drake (mother; deceased); Jason DiLaurentis (maternal half-brother)
- Spouses: Television: Archer Dunhill (ex-husband; deceased); Emily Fields (ex-wife)
- Significant others: Novels: Nick Maxwell (ex-boyfriend); Television: Ian Thomas (secret date; deceased); Ezra Fitz (dated); Cyrus Petrillo (ex-boyfriend); Gabriel Holbrook (kissed); Lorenzo Calderon (ex-boyfriend)
- Children: Television: Grace DiLaurentis-Fields; Lily DiLaurentis-Fields
- Relatives: Novels: Elizabeth DiLaurentis (paternal aunt); Television: Mary Drake (maternal aunt); Charlotte Drake (maternal cousin/adoptive sister; deceased); Spencer Hastings (maternal cousin); Alex Drake (maternal cousin); Carol Ward (maternal great aunt; deceased); Unnamed grand-mother
- Seasons: 1–7 (PLL); 1 (PLL: TP)
- Education: Rosewood Day School (formerly, graduated); Hollis College (formerly, graduated)

Alison Lauren DiLaurentis is a fictional character in the Pretty Little Liars book series, its television adaptation, and the spin-off TV series Pretty Little Liars: The Perfectionists. The character was created by American author Sara Shepard.

In the beginning of both the books and the television series, Alison is a central character who is shown mostly in flashbacks. The narrative is set when Alison mysteriously disappears and leaves the suburb of Rosewood shocked. Due to her position as a queen bee of Rosewood's social scene, Alison's actions and relations were constantly under scrutiny from the town's citizens.

Sasha Pieterse, who portrays Alison on screen, has described the character as an indecisive person, showing herself as a ruthless, manipulative girl. Due to the massive reformulation on the story's timing, pacing and overall narrative for the television adaptation, the on-screen Alison DiLaurentis holds various differences from her literary counterpart.

== Character in print ==
Pretty Little Liars is a series of books which revolves around the lives of four teenagers in Rosewood, Pennsylvania whom each struggle with different physical and psychological issues, as well as living in danger because of a dangerous stalker who emerges after the four's best friend and leader Alison DiLaurentis vanishes and is found dead.

=== Story lines ===
The twin sisters Alison and Courtney Day-DiLaurentis were born on June 6, 1990, the fruits of a secret sexual relationship between Jessica DiLaurentis and Peter Hastings. They were identical, but completely opposite in personality. Both were popular in her hometown, but Alison was known for her wickedness, unlike Courtney, who was admired for having a kind behavior. Disgusted by that fact, Alison began to make their parents—Jessica and Kenneth, the adoptive father—think that Courtney was psychologically damaged. Alison forced Courtney to impersonate her, which led to a physical fight between the two. When their parents tried to find a solution to the situation, Alison threw all the blame on Courtney, saying she was making up fake stories. Eventually Courtney was diagnosed with paranoid schizophrenia. The family then moved to Rosewood to avoid attention and shortened their surname from Day-DiLaurentis to just DiLaurentis.

However, Alison did not enjoy the full high school experience. During a visitation to the family, Courtney tricked her parents by dressing up like Alison and Alison was taken to the hospital instead. That way, Courtney took the popular life of Alison, whereas Alison was hospitalized; from then on, a sense of hatred grew within Alison. Two years after Courtney took the reins, Alison returned to the DiLaurentis house for a visit. During a night when Courtney (posing as Alison) and her new friends—Spencer Hastings, Hanna Marin, Aria Montgomery and Emily Fields—were asleep, Alison reached them and she and Courtney got into a fight in the woods surrounding the DiLaurentis residence. The fight resulted in Courtney's death. Alison and her helper and boyfriend, Nick Maxwell, buried Courtney's body later on.

When Alison was about to get her life back, Courtney's friends warned Mrs. DiLaurentis that "Alison" was missing. Jessica then assumed that Courtney (Alison, actually) did something against her sister's life and sent her back to psychological hospital. Meanwhile, masons filled the hole where Courtney's body was buried to build a gazebo. Shortly after, "Alison" was reported missing. Three years later, Courtney's friends began to be pursued by someone named "A" who knew their greatest secrets and threatened them constantly. Months later, Mona Vanderwaal, a classmate of the girls and Alison, was revealed to be "A". Soon, Alison took the stalking method and began to chase the girls, seeking revenge for them being outside that day that Courtney used them to trick her mother into believing that she were her sister.

Alison made small appearances during the period hiding behind the "A" mask. The DiLaurentis revealed the secret about the twins after a man named Billy Ford was arrested for murdering Alison, saying that they kept the sisters hidden for so long to avoid turmoil in town. Alison, posing as Courtney, someone unknown to the four girls, invited them to spend a weekend at the family home in the Poconos. There, they got together and the girls started thinking about introducing "Courtney" to the group. However, they were trapped inside a room and Alison soon revealed the whole truth about the death of the real Courtney, and about her desire for revenge. Alison then set the building on fire, but the girls managed to escape. When trying to escape the fire, Alison herself got several burns on her body and managed to escape with the help of Nick.

Alison then used the following weeks to recover from the fire whilst observing her victims. Nick stayed with her during her healing process, but Alison eventually discarded and incriminated him for everything she had committed, such as the homicides of Ian Thomas and Jenna Cavanaugh. In order to finally get her revenge, Alison wrote an entire diary with untrue stories of the girls torturing her while they were keeping her hostage. The piece was then found by the Rosewood P.D. and the girls were incriminated by the alleged death of Alison DiLaurentis. However, Emily faked her own death, and, while Alison and everyone else thought she was dead, she managed to reach Alison's lair—which was receiving help from Mrs. DiLaurentis—with police officers. The girls were eventually released from all charges, and Alison was arrested for good.

== Character on screen ==
=== Development ===
Actress Sasha Pieterse was cast as Alison DiLaurentis in December 2009. Alison was the queen bee of her school and the most popular girl before her disappearance. Although she cared for her friends, she enjoyed to use their strongest secrets against them so that they could, according to her, stay together. Charming, manipulative, and highly intelligent, Ali was skilled at finding ways to get back at everyone, and many people hated her. After the reveal of Alison's fate in the ending of season 4, Pieterse confirmed that DiLaurentis' personality had drastically changed; she has to "figure out who she is. She's been hiding for so long, and she's a victim now." "Alison's a totally different person, so to see the way they treat her is going to be very interesting and to see the way that she gets affected by it is also going to be very interesting," Pieterse said.

=== Story lines ===
==== Season 1 ====
Alison DiLaurentis is introduced as a very popular girl from the suburb of Rosewood, Pennsylvania, and the leader of a clique composed by her, Spencer Hastings, Aria Montgomery, Emily Fields and Hanna Marin. The first minutes of the pilot episode show the five friends reunited in the barn-turned-loft of the Hastings family during a night of summer vacation. In the midst of night, Hanna, Emily and Aria wake up to see Spencer arriving back to the barn after leaving to somewhere. Spencer naively announces that she has heard a scream of Alison, seemingly shaken due to something. Shortly after, Alison is pronounced as a missing person, it's been a while since Alison went missing, and a year later her body is found buried in the backyard of the DiLaurentis' house. During the year that Alison is missing the friends grew apart, but after the introduction of "A" and the return of Aria Montgomery from a year in Iceland with her family, the friends reunite. "A" makes an appearance by sending threatening text messages to the girls and leading them into trouble. During the entire first season, Alison appears in flashbacks. In these flashbacks, Alison is shown as a ruthless, despicable, two-sided teenager who uses the others' secret against themselves.

==== Season 2 ====
After Ian Thomas is pushed down by "A" from the top of a bell tower and his body goes missing, the girls are forced to keep their friendship a secret and to maintain therapy sessions with Dr. Anne Sullivan to discuss about Alison's absence in their lives, a fact that their parents believe to be the reason why the girls are behaving strangely. Days after, through Spencer's sister Melissa Hastings, the girls find Thomas' dead body, accompanied by a suicide letter in which he admits that he killed Alison. Following, the girls continue to be threatened by "A". Garrett Reynolds is arrested for Alison's murder after Jenna Marshall hands the Rosewood Police Department a missing page of Alison's autopsy. The second season ends when Mona Vanderwaal—a Rosewood High student and one of Alison's victims of bullying when she was alive—is revealed as "A". and is sent to Radley-a mental institute.

==== Season 3 ====
The third season is set five months after the previous one. One night, Spencer, Hanna, Emily and Aria get together in Spencer's living room to drink and enjoy a life without a stalker. Emily, however, is still mourning over the death of her ex-girlfriend Maya St. Germain, who died in the same night of Mona's reveal. After drinking more than expected, the girls wake up in the midst of night to discover that Emily has disappeared. They later find her in the cemetery, standing over Alison's grave, with Alison's body missing. With Emily drugged and them being involved in a crime, the girls then promise to keep the secret. They dispose of all evidence connecting them to the happening, including all of Emily's clothes. A new person using the "A" identity soon restarts the stalking game. The new stalker threatens them with what happened previously. Mostly of the season's episodes revolve around the question of where Alison's remains are. The girls later on befriend new resident CeCe Drake, a woman physically and psychologically similar to Alison. Drake reveals to them that she and Alison were best friends when Alison was alive, years prior. Throughout the following episodes Drake gets intimate with the girls, who are suspicious of her Alison-like behavior. Later on, Alison is shown in more flashbacks of the night she disappeared, with some revealing that Alison met with CeCe, Aria's father, Jenna Marshall and Garrett Reynolds that night. In sequence, the girls discover, in Alison's biology notebook, a conversation between her and a friend in which Alison talks about a "beach hottie." The girls investigate while a figure using a red coat starts to appear periodically to them, and they begin to believe that it is Alison. In the meantime, Mona and Spencer's boyfriend Toby Cavanaugh are revealed as helpers (and double agents) of the new "A". With the help of the two, the girls plot a trap to catch "A," but the stalker uses their own setting against them, and, during a fire, the girls are saved by Red Coat. Hanna wakes up and sees Red Coat staring at her, and the person is revealed to be Alison. Afterwards, Mona and Spencer claim that they also saw Alison. On the way back to Rosewood, Mona reveals that Red Coat would sometimes wear a mask that looked like Alison's face, meaning that Red Coat could have just looked like Alison.

==== Season 4 ====
After the girls find Alison's diary, they try to understand her. Throughout the season, Alison is shown in several flashbacks concerning her behavior, mostly based on histories written on her diary. The girls later meet Carla Grunwald, who tells them that she helped Alison step out of the grave where she was buried; Grunwald then drove her to a hospital, but Alison ran away. With this confirmation, the girls start a quest to find Alison, following the steps of two persons using the Red Coat costume, one of them being revealed to be CeCe. Fortunately, after a Halloween party, the girls follow a Red Coat, from Ravenswood to Rosewood, who is revealed to be Alison. She tells the girls that she needs their help, but she vanishes shortly after. Alison later appears to Emily and starts requesting things to her. The season ends when Alison sits down with her friends to explain everything that had happened to her two years earlier.

==== Season 5 ====
In the explosive season 4 finale, her friends finally find out what happened the night Alison went missing. When the story time has finished the girls are scared by an anonymous person named "A" who tries to shoot and kill the girls but mostly pointing towards Alison, this is later revealed to be Shana. When Shana Fring is killed by Aria Montgomery after being revealed as "A" and turning on Ali and the girls, Alison returns home to Rosewood after and reports to the cops. Alison makes up a story about her disappearance saying that she was kidnapped. While the girls were in New York, back in Rosewood Jessica DiLaurentis (Alison's mother) was killed and buried in the Hastings backyard. By the mid season Alison and her best friends group partially disband due to the fact that the other girls believe Alison has gone rogue after she tells the police that Cyrus Petrillo is her kidnapper, even though she was never actually kidnapped. This leads to them believe she might be the new "A" and is responsible for her mother's death, by the mid season finale, Alison is accused of killing Mona Vanderwaal, and is departed from her group until Alison's arrest for Mona's murder. While Ali is in jail, the girls head to Mona's house to see if Mona left them any clues before she died, after locating a barrel in which the girls believe is Mona's body, Hanna is arrested as an accessory for helping Ali kill Mona, as the trial begins Alison is found guilty for the murders and the rest of the girls are arrested as well as accessories to this. While being transported, Hanna, Emily, Aria, and Spencer are stopped by "A" and kidnapped and taken to "A"'s dollhouse, where they find an alive Mona.

==== Season 6 ====
In the beginning of season 6, we see Alison out of jail for a mistakened killing of Mona, and the girls with Mona are still in the dollhouse being tortured and tormented. Alison comes up with a plan with Ezra Fitz, Toby Cavanaugh, and Caleb Rivers to find the girls and make sure they come home soon. The girls are rescued along with a shaken-up Sara Harvey, who presumably went missing the same time Alison did from Courtland, and they come home after being diagnosed for having PTSD (posttraumatic stress disorder) from their time spent kidnapped. The mid season jumps 5 years into the future. Alison is a teacher at Rosewood High School and is engaged to one Archer Dunhill, then known as Elliot Rollins, who was Charlotte DiLaurentis' doctor during her five years at Welby. Alison is admitted to a psychiatric hospital due to being tricked by Mary Drake and Archer in Jessica DiLaurentis and Darren Wilden costumes, thinking that she was seeing their ghosts.

==== Season 7 ====
At the beginning of the season, Archer has Alison drugged and falsely imprisoned at Welby. In a brief lucid moment, she seemingly confesses to killing Charlotte to Emily. After growing suspicious of Archer, Emily, Aria and Spencer try to rescue Alison from Welby to no avail. She shares her location with the Liars using Archer's phone and escapes his car with the Liars hot on his trail. He is run over by Hanna. The latter half of the season involved the group covering up his death. Alison later reveals to Emily that she is pregnant, believing it to be hers and Archer's. She discovered that she was in fact impregnated at Whelby by A.D. with Emily's eggs and a then unknown man (Wren Kingston)'s sperm, during her turn at the "Liars' Lament" board game. Alison soon resumed teaching at Rosewood High and continued to have friction with Paige McCullers, Emily's girlfriend. Alison's reciprocated feelings for Emily resurface as they spend more time together. Paige realises this and gives her blessing to the couple before leaving Rosewood for good. Upon Mary Drake confessing to killing Archer, Alison along with the other Liars are no longer implicated in his murder. She and Emily co-parent their twin daughters Lily and Grace in Alison's childhood home in Rosewood. A year after A.D.'s game ended, Alison proposed to Emily. Alongside their friends, they unmask A.D. once and for all.

==== Pretty Little Liars: The Perfectionists ====
Alison now attends Beacon Heights University, where she is reunited with Mona and became a teaching assistant. Alison is then introduced to Claire Hotchkiss, whose family is the founder of BHU, and her son Nolan. After Nolan is murdered, Alison goes on to help his remaining friends Ava, Caitlin, and Dylan who are the primary suspects of the murder. After receiving a divorce paper from her wife, Alison decides to investigate the death of Taylor Hotchkiss who allegedly committed suicide a year ago. After finding and convincing Taylor to return, Alison and the group continue to deal with Dana Booker, the head security of BHU who is investigating Nolan's death. After Dana exposed their secrets, Alison and Dylan are expelled from BHU, Mona is fired, while Caitlin and Ava had to leave. However, after Caitlin's boyfriend Jeremy is accused of the murder and is shot by Taylor, Claire apologized to the group and allowed them to stay. The group is then introduced to The Professor, who reveals that the group is a part of their experiment.

== Reception ==
=== Critical ===
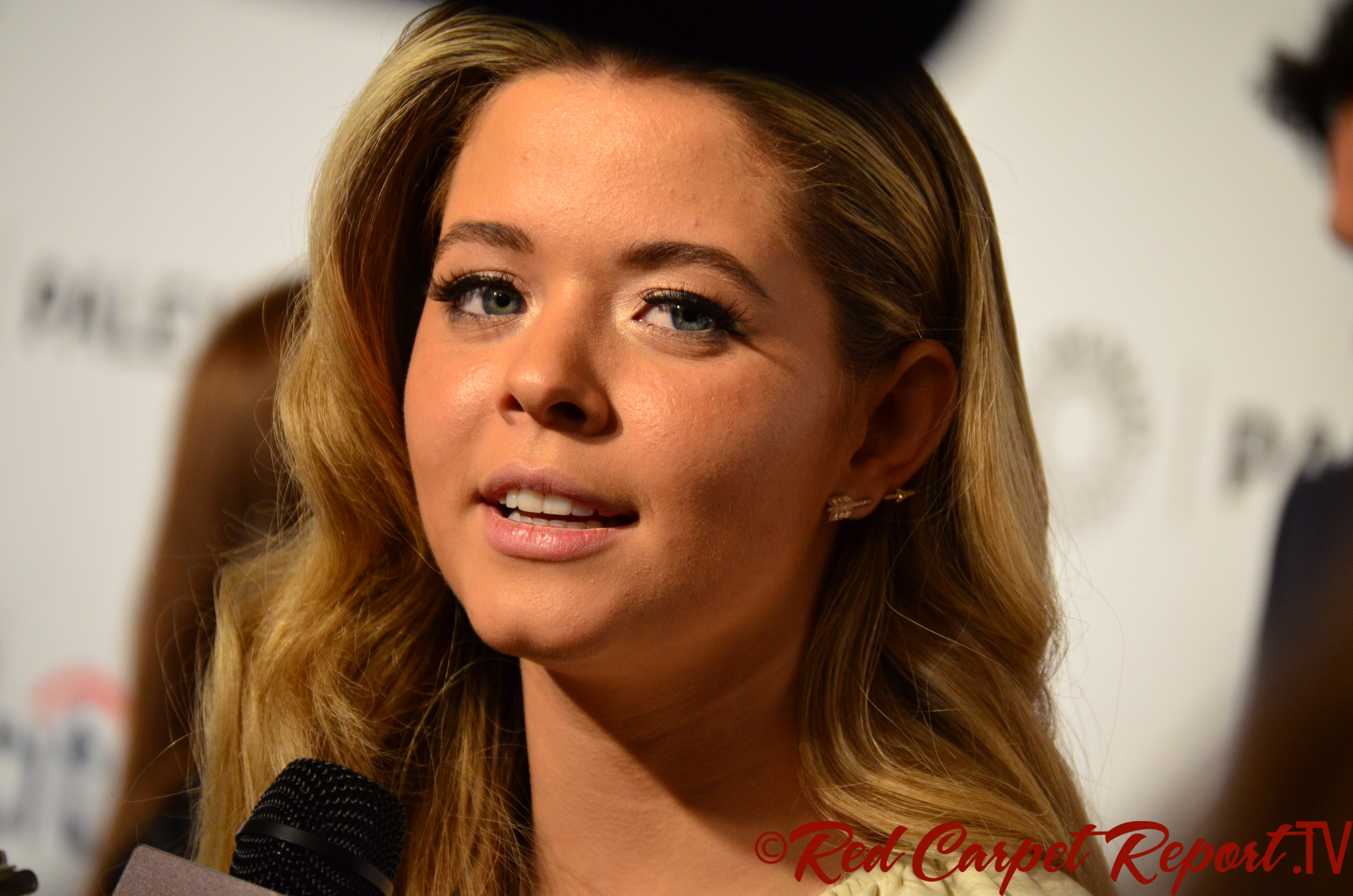
Pieterse's acting received consistent critical acclaim.

Across the seven season run of Pretty Little Liars, Pieterse's character of Alison DiLaurentis received much positive reception early on by critics, which became mixed as the show altered the character.

In earlier seasons and when appearing in flashbacks, Alison was praised as a pivotal character to the plot of the series despite being presumed deceased. Aya Tsintziras of Screen Rant praised her character for her large impact on the show, and "[continuing] to make fans wonder what's going on". She was also named by Screen Rant as part of "10 Of The Most Iconic Mean Girls From TV" for her secretiveness and manipulation. Alternatively, Pieterse's character is berated for displaying the latter on her close friends and family, and seemingly feeling remorseless for her wrondoings, being referred to as "a mean girl who [makes] Regina George look sweet".

The Season 3 finale, which revealed that Alison was still alive, caused subsequent reception of the character to change. The reveal itself was generally praised for being a dramatic twist, with many viewers becoming excited to see the character alive and interacting with the other Liars in real time. Following the events of "'A' Is for Answers", Autumne Montague of TVOvermind lauded Pieterse's character for her self-awareness in having admitted not being a good friend, calling the moment "refreshing from a girl who in flashbacks seemed simply self-absorbed." Alison was also praised by for becoming more mature and caring, and more likable as a human being.

However, Alison also began to acquire more criticism for being portrayed radically different to her persona in earlier seasons. In Seasons 6 and 7 in particular, many fans felt that her dynamic changing from self-serving "mean girl" to codependent and empathetic, albeit partly due to the trauma of her time away from Rosewood, was unrealistic and poorly written. Den of Geek reviewer Caroline Preece referred to Alison's character development after her re-appearance as unnatural and incoherent to the original storyline, and that the character herself became "meek, and sensible, and boring". Preece described the change of demeanor in Alison as "[feeling] like she had been silenced all over again, and it felt like the writers were wasting the opportunity of having resurrected her at all".

In Pretty Little Liars: The Perfectionists, the character was slightly better received than in the later seasons of Pretty Little Liars. However, Alison's divorce of Emily Fields was seen as anti-climactic, and consequently met with extreme backlash.

Pieterse herself has received universal approval from fans and critics alike for her portrayal of the character, even despite being cast at the age of 12. She was nominated for multiple awards, winning the Breakout Actress and Scene Stealer awards in Choice TV.

=== Awards and nominations ===
Year	Ceremony	Category	Outcome	Reference(s)
2011	ShoWest Awards	Breakthrough Performer of the Year	Nominated	
2014	Teen Choice Awards	Choice TV: Breakout Actress	Won	
2015	MTV Fandom Awards	Ship of the Year (shared with Shay Mitchell)	Nominated	
2015	Teen Choice Awards	Choice TV: Scene Stealer	Nominated	
2016	Teen Choice Awards	Choice TV: Scene Stealer	Won	
2017	Teen Choice Awards	Choice TV Actress: Drama	Nominated	
2017	Teen Choice Awards	Choice TV: Ship (shared with Shay Mitchell)	Nominated	
