= Yani Gellman =

Canadian actor

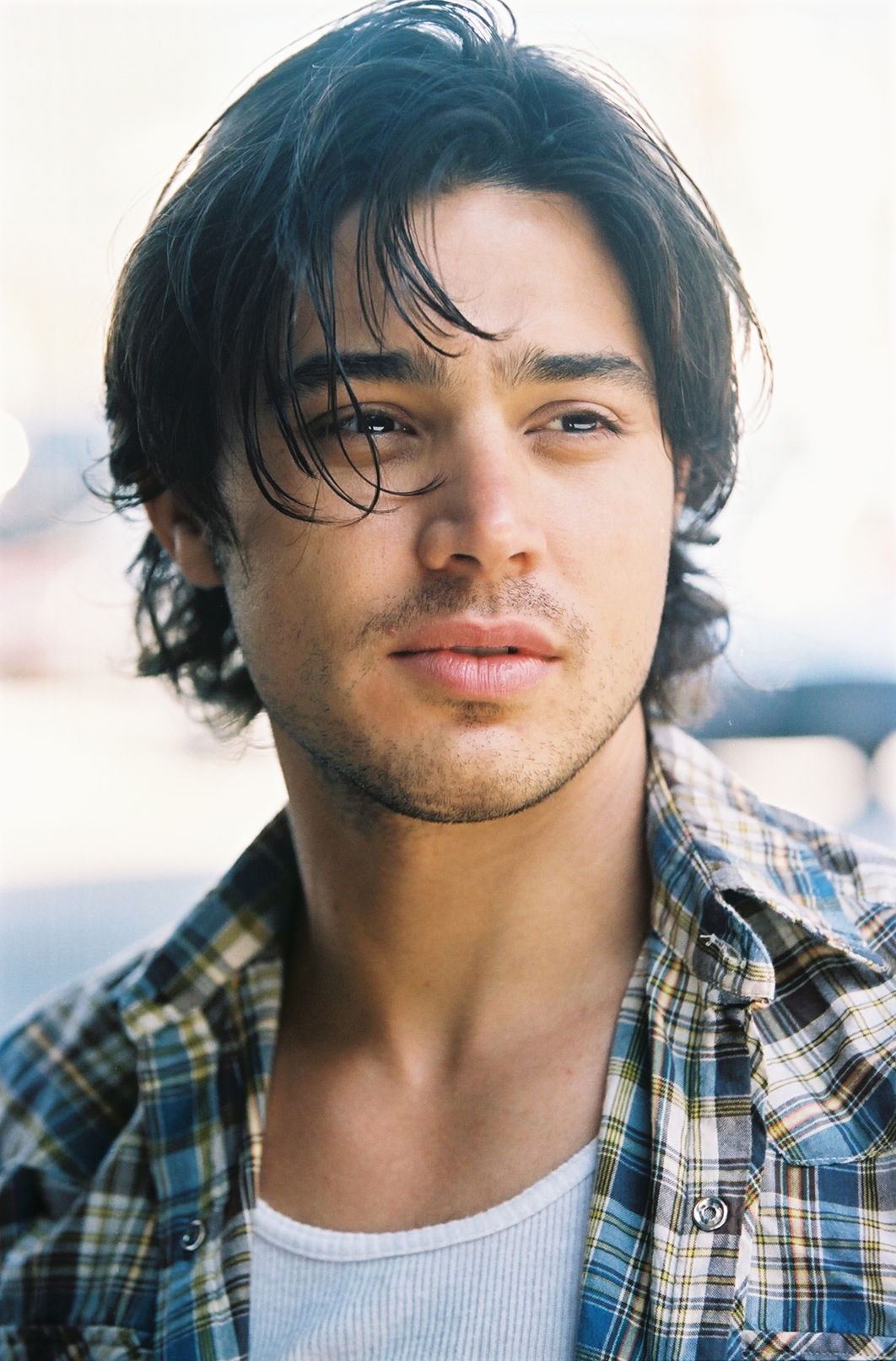
- Born: September 2, 1985 (age 41); Miami, Florida, U.S.
- Occupation: Actor
- Years active: 1998–present

Yani Gellman (born September 2, 1985) is a Canadian film and television actor, known for playing Paolo Valisari in The Lizzie McGuire Movie, Garrett Reynolds in Pretty Little Liars and Diego Flores in 90210.

== Early life ==
Gellman was born in Miami, Florida, to a Canadian father and an Australian mother, and lived in North York, Canada. He is of Russian Jewish, English, and Spanish descent. He was named after a family friend, writer Jan Yoors. His father was a reporter, and the family frequently moved during Gellman's childhood, living in Australia, Spain, and Texas before settling in Toronto. Gellman speaks Spanish, having learned it during his time living in Spain. He has a university degree in political science.

== Career ==
Gellman's acting debut was in a 1998 episode of the television series, Animorphs. After appearing in several more television productions, he was cast in supporting roles in the 2000 film, Urban Legends: Final Cut and in 2001's Jason X. In both films, his characters eventually became victims of serial killers. He appeared in 2002's The Matthew Shepard Story as Pablo, the love interest of the title character. Gellman became known among teenage audiences after playing the part of Paolo Valisari, an Italian pop singer and the main antagonist of 2003's The Lizzie McGuire Movie.

He has been cast in the Canadian series Monster Warriors. From 2008 to 2012 he played Rafe Torres in the long-running soap opera, The Young and the Restless. Gellman has also appeared as a model in numerous print ads, including Omega watches. He made a cameo in Degrassi Goes Hollywood, as well as playing Pete in multiple episodes of "Greek". He has recently played the role of police officer, Garrett Reynolds in hit TV show Pretty Little Liars. He has also starred as Diego in the hit TV show 90210.

In 2017, Gellman appeared in the underwater survival thriller film 47 Meters Down which was released in theaters on 16 June 2017.

== Filmography ==
=== Film ===
Year	Title	Role	Notes
2000	Urban Legends: Final Cut	Rob	
2001	Jason X	Stoney	
2003	The Lizzie McGuire Movie	Paolo Valisari	
2013	Crystal Lake Memories: The Complete History of Friday the 13th	Himself	Documentary film
2017	47 Meters Down	Louis	
2023	Departing Seniors	Mr. Arda	

=== Television ===
Year	Title	Role	Notes
1998	Goosebumps	Young Man	2 episodes
1998	Animorphs	Brad	Episode: "The Forgotten"
2000	The Famous Jett Jackson	JB Follower	Episode: "What You Wish For"
2001	Blue Murder	Patrick Lee	Episode: "All Saints"
2001	Sex, Lies & Obsession	Romeo	Television film
2001	Boss of Bosses	Young Paul Castellano	Television film
2002	The Matthew Shepard Story	Pablo	Television film
2002	Mentors	King Tutankhamen	Episode: "Cursed"
2002	Tru Confessions	Billy	Television film
2002	Guinevere Jones	Michael Medina	Lead role (26 episodes)
2003–2004	Wild Card	Ryder	Recurring role, 8 episodes
2006–2007	Monster Warriors	Antonio	Lead role
2007	Trapped	Carlitos	Documentary series
2008–2012	The Young and the Restless	Rafe Torres	86 episodes
2009	Degrassi Goes Hollywood	The Shores Boy	Television film
2009	Lincoln Heights	Marco Gutierrez	2 episodes
2010	Greek	Pete / Omega Chi	3 episodes
2011–2012	Pretty Little Liars	Officer Garrett Reynolds	Recurring role (23 episodes)
2012	90210	Diego Flores	7 episodes
2012	The Mentalist	Julian Gallego	Episode: "Devil's Cherry"
2012	Beauty & the Beast	Sam	Episode: "All In"
2013	Criminal Minds	Mitchell Ruiz	Episode: "Broken"
2013	CSI: Crime Scene Investigation	Doug Lasky	Episode: "Ghosts of the Past"
2013	The Client List	Diego Shankman	Episode: "I Miss Back Then"
2013	Category 5	Pete Keller	Television film
2014	Castle	Manny Castro	Episode: "Law & Boarder"
2014	Major Crimes	Dante	Episode: "Major Crimes"
2015	Trigger Point	Jared Church	Television film
2015	Blood & Oil	A.J. Menendez	Episode: "Pilot"
2015	iZombie	Gabriel	2 episodes
2015	CSI: Cyber	Jackson Richmond	Episode: "Shades of Grey"
2017	The Psycho She Met Online	Tyler Hexley	Television film
2017	The Saint	Doyle Cosentino	Television film
2018	Dynasty	Manuel	3 episodes
2019	Bosch	Jose Esquivel Jr.	4 episodes
2024	A Bestselling Kind of Love	Tom	Television film

=== Web ===
Year	Title	Role	Notes
2012	Pretty Dirty Secrets	Garrett Reynolds	Episode: "I'm a Free Man"
