= Sara Shepard =

American author

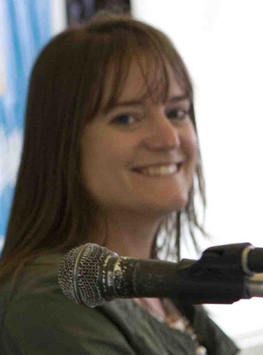
- Shepard at the Brooklyn Book Festival in 2010
- Born: April 8, 1977 (age 49); Pittsburgh, Pennsylvania, U.S.
- Education: New York University (BS); Brooklyn College (MFA)
- Occupation: Author
- Writing career
- Period: 2005–present
- Genres: Young adult fiction; mystery; thriller
- Notable works: Pretty Little Liars; The Lying Game
- Website: www.saracshepard.com

Sara Shepard (born April 8, 1977) is an American author. She is known for the bestselling Pretty Little Liars and The Lying Game book series, both of which have been turned into television shows on Freeform.

== Early and personal life ==
Shepard grew up with a sister named Alison. She graduated from Downingtown High School in Downingtown, Pennsylvania in 1995. She attended New York University, where she graduated with a B.S. degree in 1999 and an MFA in Creative Writing from Brooklyn College in 2004. From 2000 to 2005, Shepard worked at Time, Inc. Custom Publishing and produced lifestyle magazines for corporate clients. She started ghostwriting as a freelancer in 2002 and writing her own books in 2005.

Shepard currently resides in Pittsburgh, Pennsylvania.

== Television shows ==
Shepard's book series Pretty Little Liars and The Lying Game have both been turned into television series by ABC Family (now under the name of Freeform). The Pretty Little Liars series of novels is "loosely based on her experiences growing up in Chester County". The adaptation television series Pretty Little Liars lasted for seven seasons. Actresses Troian Bellisario, Ashley Benson, Shay Mitchell, and Lucy Hale star as the main characters Spencer Hastings, Hanna Marin, Emily Fields and Aria Montgomery. Shepard had a cameo on two episodes of the show: "The Homecoming Hangover", as a substitute teacher and "I'm a Good Girl, I Am", as the news reporter.

The Lying Game premiered on August 15, 2011 on ABC Family. Like the former, The Lying Game is also loosely based on the book series. ABC Family took an unusually long time to decide whether or not to renew The Lying Game beyond season 2, and the cast's contract options lapsed in April 2013 with only Alexandra Chando signing a new option. The network confirmed the cancellation of The Lying Game in July 2013, after Chando had announced the news on Twitter and Instagram. Chando starred as the main two characters Sutton Mercer and Emma Becker.

On September 25, 2017, it was announced that Shephard’s 2014 book series The Perfectionists would be loosely adapted into a television series, titled Pretty Little Liars: The Perfectionists, serving as a sequel to the television series Pretty Little Liars on Freeform. Sasha Pieterse and Janel Parrish have confirmed to reprise their original Pretty Little Liars roles as Alison DiLaurentis and Mona Vanderwaal. The series featured characters from The Perfectionists series played by actors Sofia Carson, Sydney Park, Eli Brown and Kelly Rutherford as Ava Jalali, Caitlin Martell-Lewis, Dylan Wright and Claire Hotchkiss, respectively. The series is cancelled after one season. On September 29, 2017, it was announced that Shepard's 2014 book The Heiresses would be adapted into a television series for ABC, with Shay Mitchell starring as Corrine Saybrook. As of 2018, the network has not move forward The Heiresses.

In May 2019, it was announced that Shepard would produce the anthology web series Crown Lake, which debuted on Brat on June 20, 2019. Shepard created a podcast series titled Cruise Ship, which was released by Meet Cute on July 6, 2021.

== Bibliography ==
=== Young Adult ===
==== Pretty Little Liars ====
- Pretty Little Liars (2006) (ISBN 978-0-06-088730-8)
- Flawless (2007) (ISBN 978-0-06-088733-9)
- Perfect (2007) (ISBN 978-0-06-088736-0)
- Unbelievable (2008) (ISBN 978-0-06-088739-1)
- Wicked (2008) (ISBN 978-0-06-156607-3)
- Killer (2009) (ISBN 978-0-06-156611-0)
- Heartless (2010) (ISBN 978-0-06-156614-1)
- Wanted (2010) (ISBN 978-0-06-156617-2)
- Twisted (2011) (ISBN 978-0-06-208101-8)
- Ruthless (2011) (ISBN 978-0-06-208186-5)
- Stunning (2012) (ISBN 978-0-06-208189-6)
- Burned (2012) (ISBN 978-0-06-208192-6)
- Crushed (2013) (ISBN 978-0-06-219971-3)
- Deadly (2013) (ISBN 978-0-06-219974-4)
- Toxic (2014) (ISBN 978-0-06-228701-4)
- Vicious (2014) (ISBN 978-0-06-228704-5)
- The Liars (2023) (ISBN 979-8400141430)

Companion novels and novelas

- Alison's Pretty Little Diary (2010) (ISBN 978-0-06-223336-3)
- Pretty Little Secrets (2012) (ISBN 978-0-06-212591-0)
- Ali's Pretty Little Lies (2013) (ISBN 978-0-06-223336-3)
- Pretty Little Love (2017)
- Pretty Little Lost (2017)
- It's Not Easy Being "A" (2017)

- Pretty Little Love: The Entire Journey (2020)

==== The Lying Game ====
- The Lying Game (2010) (ISBN 978-0061869716)
- Never Have I Ever (2011)
- Two Truths and a Lie (2012)
- Hide and Seek (2012)
- Cross My Heart, Hope to Die (2013)
- Seven Minutes in Heaven (2013)

Companion novelas

- The First Lie (2012)
- True Lies (2013)

==== The Perfectionists ====
- The Perfectionists (2014) (ISBN 978-0-06-207450-8)
- The Good Girls (2015) (ISBN 978-0-06-207453-9)

==== The Amateurs ====
- The Amateurs (2016) (ISBN 978-1-48-474227-3)
- Follow Me (2017) (ISBN 978-1-48-474228-0)
- Last Seen (2018) (ISBN 978-1484742273)

==== Standalone ====
- Influence (January 5, 2021), (co-written with Lilia Buckingham)
- Agatha Harkness: Fall of the Coven (2026) (ISBN 9781368114691)

=== Adult fiction ===
- The Visibles (May 5, 2009) (ISBN 978-1416597407)
- Everything We Ever Wanted (October 10, 2011) (ISBN 978-0062080066)
- The Heiresses (May 20, 2014) (ISBN 978-0-06-225953-0)
- The Elizas (April 17, 2018) (ISBN 978-1501162770)
- Reputation (December 3, 2019) (ISBN 978-1524742904)
- Memory Lane (January 13, 2021) (co-written with Ellen Goodlett)
- Safe in My Arms (July 27, 2021)
- Cruise Ship (2021)
- Wait for Me (November 1, 2022)
- Nowhere Like Home (February 20, 2024)
- Gaslight (September 17, 2024) (co-written with Miles Joris-Peyrafitte)

=== Middle grade ===
==== Penny Draws ====
- Penny Draws a Best Friend (May 16, 2023) (ISBN 9780593616772)
- Penny Draws a School Play (September 5, 2023) (ISBN 9780593616802)
- Penny Draws a Secret Adventure (March 5, 2024) (ISBN 9780593616840)
- Penny Draws a Class Trip (July 16, 2024) (ISBN 9780593616864)
- Penny Draws a Team Sport (March 4, 2025) (ISBN 9780593700310)
- Penny Draws a First Crush (July 15, 2025) (ISBN 9780593700341)

== Filmography ==
Year	Title	Role	Notes
2010	Pretty Little Liars	Ms. Shepard	Cameo appearance; "The Homecoming Hangover" (1.07)
2015	Pretty Little Liars	News reporter "Sara Shepard"	Cameo appearance; "I'm a Good Girl, I Am" (5.24)

=== Role credits ===
Year	Title	Role	Notes
2019–2022	Crown Lake	Writer / producer	Web series
2021–2022	Memory Lane	Co-creator / writer	Podcast series
2021	Cruise Ship	Creator / writer	Podcast series
2022	The Liars	Creator / writer	Podcast series
