= Eli Brown =

American actor

- Born: Elijah Brown; August 13, 1999 (age 26); Eugene, Oregon, U.S.
- Occupation: Actor
- Years active: 2019–present
- Parent(s): Sam Brown, Katie Brown
- Relatives: Sasha Brown (sister)

Elijah Brown (born August 13, 1999) is an American actor. He is known for his role as Dylan Walker on the Freeform series Pretty Little Liars: The Perfectionists (2019) and for playing Otto "Obie" Bergmann IV on the HBO Max series Gossip Girl (2021–2023).

== Early and personal life ==
Born on August 13, 1999, he is originally from Eugene, Oregon.

As of 2021, Brown resides in Brooklyn, New York to be closer to the set of Gossip Girl.

== Career ==
In March 2018, it was announced that Brown had been cast in the Freeform mystery series, Pretty Little Liars: The Perfectionists. Brown played Dylan Walker as part of the main cast of the series, which was his first audition and first on-screen role. The series premiered on March 20, 2019, and ended its 10-episode run on May 22, 2019, being officially cancelled after one season in September 2019. Brown had a guest role as Dave on the Netflix series, Spinning Out. He was featured in two episodes of the series sole season, which was released on January 1, 2020. In December 2019, it was announced that Brown had been cast in the film Run Hide Fight. Brown played Tristan Voy, the main antagonist of the film, which had its world premiere at the Venice Film Festival on September 10, 2020.

Brown starred as Brett Blackmore, the lead role, in the film The F**k-It List, which was released on Netflix on July 1, 2020. In March 2020, it was announced that Brown had joined the main cast of Gossip Girl on HBO Max. Brown portrayed Otto "Obie" Bergmann IV on the series, which premiered on July 8, 2021, and ran for two seasons.

== Filmography ==
=== Film ===
Year	Title	Role	Notes	Ref.
2018	Cupid's Paradise	Partygoer	Short film	
2020	Cogito	Boy	Short film	
2020	The F**k-It List	Brett Blackmore		
2020	Run Hide Fight	Tristan Voy		
2021	Wrath of Man	Dougie Hargreaves		
2024	After Midnight	Him	Short film	
2024	A Complete Unknown	Mike Bloomfield		
2025	The Truth About Engine		Short film	
2025	Frontier Crucible	Jeff		
TBA	Goodbye Girl		Post-production	

=== Television ===
Year	Title	Role	Credit	Notes	Ref.
2019	Pretty Little Liars: The Perfectionists	Dylan Walker	Main	10 episodes	
2020	Spinning Out	Dave	Recurring	2 episodes	
2021–2023	Gossip Girl	Otto "Obie" Bergmann IV	Main	22 episodes	
