= Aeriél Miranda =

American actress (born 1992)

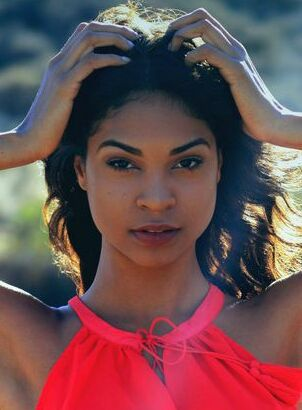
- Aeriél Miranda Commercial
- Born: April 3, 1992 (age 34); Dallas, Texas, U.S.
- Occupations: Actress, Model, Filmmaker
- Years active: 2006–present

Aeriél "Ari" Miranda (born April 3, 1992) is an American actress and model. She is best known for her recurring role as Shana Fring on Freeform's series Pretty Little Liars (2013–2015). She was first introduced as Shana on the web series, Pretty Dirty Secrets (2012), prior to appearing on Pretty Little Liars. Miranda also recurred as Lana on The Nine Lives of Chloe King and The CW series The Tomorrow People. Other roles include Straight Outta Compton (film debut) and the OWN comedy For Better or Worse.

== Early life ==
Aeriél was born and raised in Dallas, Texas and seasonally lived in Boston, Massachusetts and New Orleans, Louisiana. She was brought up by youthful parents; her mother is an African-American psychologist who hails from Louisiana and her father is from New Bedford, Massachusetts. Her paternal family origins are rooted in Cape Verde. She is of mixed West African, Portuguese, Creole, French, German and Jewish descent. Miranda is a Latin-Sephardic surname meaning "she who must be admired."

As a little girl, Aeriél was profoundly inspired by her Nana, who introduced cinematic classics such as "The Sound of Music", "West Side Story", "Oliver Twist", "E.T" and tons of Disney animated films to her at a young age. Thus, her interest in the performing arts was born. She studied ballet at Etgen-Atkinson Ballet School and began her theatrical journey by joining and performing in plays for the “Dallas Children's Theater.” At an early age, she adopted an affinity for music, learning to play the piano and violin. As a teen, Miranda competed in the fifth season of the Discovery Kids reality competition series Endurance as a member of the Red Team, followed by competing in a family edition of Fear Factor.

== Career ==
=== Commercials and modeling ===
Miranda began her work in the modeling industry at the age of 15, appearing in commercials and advertisements for brands such as Nike, Sprite, J.C. Penney, Victoria's Secret, Bed Head by TIGI, Old Navy and Apple.

=== Television and film ===
In 2011, Miranda made her television debut on the ABC Family series “The Nine Lives of Chloe King.” She was a guest on ”Dr. Phil”, speaking on universal issues surrounding teenagers. Miranda went on to appear in various television shows, including The CW science fiction series “The Tomorrow People” and the TV Land series “Jennifer Falls.” Miranda was later cast in the Freeform series “Pretty Little Liars” based on the book series of the same name. Miranda later starred in the summer 2015 Universal Pictures film Straight Outta Compton. While making her film debut, her time working with director F. Gary Gray sparked her film production interest. She has guest starred on the Oprah Winfrey Network comedy series For Better or Worse, working alongside Tyler Perry.

== Filmography ==
=== Film ===
Year	Title	Role	Notes	Ref(s)
2012	Tipping Point	Gina	Short film	
2013	Love Triangle	April		
2015	Straight Outta Compton	Lavetta		
2015	For Better or Worse	Ina		
2016	Shock	Bianka Davis		
2017	Almost Amazing	Vanessa		
2019	Lazarus	Ember		
2019	A Madea Family Funeral	Gia		

=== Television ===
Year	Title	Role	Notes	Ref(s)
2006–2007	Endurance	Herself	13 episodes, 4th place	
2006	Fear Factor	Herself	Episode: "Family Fear Factor"	
2011	The Nine Lives of Chloe King	Lana	Recurring role; 4 episodes	
2013–2014	Pretty Little Liars	Shana Fring	Recurring role; 13 episodes	
2013	The Tomorrow People	Piper Nichols	Episode: "Sorry for Your Loss"	
2014	Jennifer Falls	Marissa Rosales	Episode: "School Trouble"	
2017	Bridal Boot Camp	Felice Davis	Television film	

=== Web ===
Year	Title	Role	Notes	Ref(s)
2012	Pretty Dirty Secrets	Shana Fring	Main role; 5 episodes	
2014	BlackBoxTV	Keira	Episode: "The Fourth Door"	

=== Producer ===
Year	Title	Notes	Ref(s)
2016	African Booty Scratcher	Short film	
