= Pretty Little Liars (novel series) =

Young adult novel series

- Arc 1: Pretty Little Liars (2006) · Flawless (2007) · Perfect (2007) · Unbelievable (2008); Arc 2: Wicked (2008) · Killer (2009) · Heartless (2010) · Wanted (2010) Arc 3: Twisted (2011) · Ruthless (2011) · Stunning (2012) · Burned (2012) Arc 4: Crushed (2013) · Deadly (2013) · Toxic (2014) · Vicious (2014) Companion novels: Pretty Little Secrets (2012); Ali's Pretty Little Lies
- Author: Sara Shepard
- Country: United States
- Language: English
- Genre: Young adult Mystery; Romance; Coming of age Slice of life
- Publisher: HarperTeen
- Published: October 2006 – December 2014
- Media type: Print (hardback & paperback); Audiobook; E-book
- No. of books: 16 (and 2 companion novels)

Pretty Little Liars is a series of young adult novels by Sara Shepard. Beginning with 2006's initial novel of the same name, the series follows the lives of four girls—Spencer Hastings, Hanna Marin, Aria Montgomery and Emily Fields.

The novels appeared on The New York Times Best Seller list for 62 weeks. The series spawned a media franchise with a television series adaptation loosely based on the novels which debuted on June 8, 2010, on ABC Family. The franchise has been licensed by Amazon.com's Kindle Worlds range of non-canon ebooks.

== Overview ==
The series is loosely divided into arcs, chronicling the introduction and reveal of each "A". Set in the suburbs of Rosewood, Pennsylvania, the series follows the lives of four teenage girls nicknamed the Pretty Little Liars or simply the Liars, whose clique falls apart after the disappearance of their queen bee leader, Alison DiLaurentis. Three years after her mysterious disappearance, the girls begin receiving intimidating messages from an anonymous character named "A". "A" threatens to expose their secrets, including long-forgotten ones they thought only Alison knew. Shortly after the messages begin, Alison's body is discovered buried in her yard. The books progress with the four girls trying to figure out the identity of "A" and facing many dangerous obstacles as they do.

== Characters ==
The series has many characters, most of them recurring. The main characters are:

Spencer Hastings: Spencer is a headstrong, intelligent, overachieving girl who comes from the wealthy Hastings family and is forced into winning everything. She has wavy blonde hair and wears preppy outfits when not in sports clothes.

Hanna Marin: Hanna is self-absorbed, popularity obsessed, strong, and the "it-girl" of the group following Alison's disappearance. She has an eating disorder which Alison taunts her for. She is Jewish, and has long dark brown hair she often dyes auburn.

Aria Montgomery: Aria is a quirky and artsy girl who, at the beginning of the books, is trying to find herself. She is very tall and pale with dark black hair that she occasionally highlights.

Emily Fields: Emily is considered the jock of the group, being a physical, loyal girl who struggles with her sexuality. Near the end of the series she also struggles with depression and suicidal thoughts. Emily is Catholic and described with red hair and a muscular frame.

Alison DiLaurentis: Alison is the former "Queen Bee" of her clique, consisting of Spencer, Hanna, Aria and Emily. It is later revealed that the Alison the girls thought they knew was her twin sister, Courtney. "Real Ali" was friends with Naomi Zeigler and Riley Wolfe up until the sixth grade, when Courtney took her place. Ali was supposedly killed at the beginning of the series; however, she is revealed to have been alive and their tormentor, "A". "A" sought revenge for being mistaken as her twin sister Courtney and being sent the Preserve at Addison-Stevens, a facility for mentally ill patients, which she believed was the Liars' fault.

Her identical twin sister, Courtney DiLaurentis, debuted in Wanted after the TV show began in 2010. She has an older brother, Jason DiLaurentis, and her half-sisters are Melissa and Spencer Hastings.

Courtney DiLaurentis: "Alison", the one who originally befriended the four girls in the sixth grade, is later revealed to be Courtney (often referred to by the Liars as Our Ali, or Their Ali.) She is the third child of Jessica and Kenneth DiLaurentis and Alison's twin sister. The twins were described to be inseparable as children, but Alison began to exhibit a vicious jealousy towards Courtney as they grew up, culminating in her attempting to drown Courtney. Alison manipulated Courtney into adamantly referring to herself as Alison in an attempt to get Courtney institutionalized. Courtney was sent to The Preserve at Addison-Stevens after a physical argument with Alison. Years later during a rare visit home, Courtney tricked their parents to believe Alison was Courtney. Alison's claims that she was the real Ali caused her parents to believe her even less, and the real Ali was sent to The Preserve. Subsequently, Courtney befriends the Liars and morphs into "Queen Bee Ali" until the night of her infamous disappearance, when she was killed and buried by the real Alison DiLaurentis and Nick Maxwell.

A: A is the main antagonist of the series, being an anonymous character who relentlessly torments the cast, particularly the Liars. Over the course of the series Mona Vanderwaal, Alison DiLaurentis and Nick Maxwell are revealed to be "A". Mona, the original iteration of A, did so due to Alison and the Liars being responsible for "The Jenna Thing", which also injured her. After Mona's death another "A" takes over, this time even more determined to hurt the Liars. This "A" is later revealed to be Alison, who wanted revenge on the Liars for ruining her life, and Nick, her accomplice.

== Novels ==
=== First Arc ===
Book #	Title	Publication date	ISBN	Pages
1	Pretty Little Liars	October 3, 2006	978-0-06-088730-8	304
The story begins introducing an exclusive group of friends: Alison DiLaurentis, the popular yet manipulative queen bee; Aria Montgomery, an independent oddball who went to Iceland over the summer; Emily Fields, a swimmer who has a secret crush on Alison; Hanna Marin, who strives to be thin and popular like Alison; and Spencer Hastings, an overachiever that stands up against Alison's manipulative ways. Alison mysteriously disappears during a sleepover with the girls in the summer before 8th grade. The story then skips to 3 years later, when the girls no longer speak to each other. Aria returns to Rosewood from a 3-year trip to Iceland much more sophisticated than before she left. She meets and makes out with a man in a local bar who is revealed later to be her new English teacher, Ezra Fitz. Emily befriends a girl who has recently moved to Rosewood, Maya St. Germain, and soon develops romantic feelings for her, even though Emily has a boyfriend, Ben. Maya spends more time with Emily, helping her escape her conservative family; however, Emily's mother - Kathleen - is racist and disapproves of their friendship. Ben later finds Maya and Emily kissing in the photo booth at a party and dumps beer on them. Hanna has become popular alongside Mona Vanderwaal, who she is extremely attached to. She and Mona occasionally shoplift, and Hanna is caught and arrested for stealing earrings and necklaces from a jewelry shop. Hanna's mother pays her bail. She also has a strained relationship with her boyfriend, Sean Ackard, due to his virginity club vows. She is arrested and bailed out again after taking and accidentally crashing his father's car, causing them to break up. Hanna battles her eating disorder, living with her absent workaholic mother, and managing the stress of keeping her queen bee status. Spencer continues to struggle with her long-standing rivalry with Melissa Hastings, her perfect older sister. She begins to feel attracted to Melissa's new boyfriend, Wren Kim. Eventually, Melissa catches Spencer and Wren kissing and informs their parents, who reprimand Spencer. Melissa breaks up with Wren, who returns later to meet with Spencer. Throughout the story, the Liars get messages threatening to reveal their secrets, including an incident the girls refer to as "The Jenna Thing". They believe it is their missing friend, Alison, because she is the only one each of them told their darkest secrets. However, they are shocked when the police find her corpse buried in the gazebo of her former house. The book ends with the Liars receiving a text at Alison's funeral saying, "I'm still here, bitches. And I know everything. -A".
2	Flawless	March 27, 2007	978-0-06-088733-9	330
Spencer Hastings, Hanna Marin, Aria Montgomery, and Emily Fields continue to receive text messages from an unknown person, "A", and are more desperate than ever to discover their identity. "A" continues to taunt them with the threat of exposing their many secrets. At first the girls believe "A" is Alison, but they soon start to believe the person behind the threats is Toby due to references to "The Jenna Thing". With Alison dead, he is the only other person who was a part of the incident besides the Liars. "The Jenna Thing" is revealed to be an incident in which Ali had set off a firework in Jenna Cavanaugh's step-brother Toby's treehouse to get revenge after Toby spied on the Liars changing. The firework caused the treehouse burst into flames, not knowing that Jenna was inside, she was permanently blinded. Toby was framed for the fire by Alison, and everyone but Spencer is unaware of why he took the blame for what happened. "A" sends Emily a text message hinting that "A" knows about Emily and Maya's romantic relationship, and threatens to tell everyone about it. Emily becomes close with Toby and goes to a benefit party with him, but then later tells him she thinks she might be gay. "A" leaves a note for Hanna forcing her to tell Naomi and Riley that she makes herself throw up and Sean broke up with her. Later, she receives a text that tells her Sean is at Foxy with another girl. Hanna is shocked to discover her former boyfriend Sean Ackard ignoring his Virginity Club vows and nearly having sex with Aria. "A" tells Aria to either 'get rid of the problem' or tell her mother the truth about Byron, her father, and his affair with his student Meredith Gates. Aria goes to confront the other woman, but when she does Meredith tells her that she and Aria's father are in love. Ella finds out about Byron's affair and kicks him out, leaving Ella and Aria's relationship shattered as she learns Aria had known about the affair. Spencer continues to date with her sister Melissa's ex-boyfriend Wren and loses her virginity to him. However, Melissa begins to hook-up with him as well. After receiving a text from "A" about Foxy, Hanna realizes "A" is at the party and informs Spencer and Aria. The three believe it to be Toby, but discover Emily has gone home with him after her ex-boyfriend, Ben, attempted to rape her. Spencer phones Emily, but the two get cut off. In the car, Emily rambles to Toby, feeling overwhelmed, and he rants about Alison to her, saying he is happy she's dead. Startled by this, Emily flees from the car and runs home. Toby arrives as well, banging on the door shouting that he needs to talk to her. She receives the call from Spencer, but hangs up after spotting Toby. Emily tells him she knows what he did to 'her', meaning Alison, causing Toby to freak out and beg her to not tell the police. The next day, Toby is found dead by suicide on the road leading to Emily's house. It is revealed that Toby raped Jenna when they were in middle school, and Ali and Spencer knew about it, which is how Alison forced Toby to take the blame for "The Jenna Thing". A traumatized Emily feels responsible for Toby's suicide as he believed that she knew about him and Jenna.
3	Perfect	August 21, 2007	978-0-06-088736-0	298
The girls no longer speak to each other. Aria and Hanna refuse to speak to each other because Aria is seeing Hanna's ex-boyfriend. Emily has isolated herself due to her guilt over Toby's death, and Spencer is busy and spends her time alone. Now homeless after being kicked out by her mother for hiding her father's affair, Aria goes to live with her new boyfriend, Sean Ackard. Still seeing Ezra, their relationship is broken up when Sean informs the police, having found out the secret from "A". Aria and Ezra were together in bed when the police raided Ezra's place and arrested him. Sean breaks up with her, leaving Aria homeless again. Aria fails to reach her father. She looks at homemade videos that she made years ago and realizes that Alison was also "dating" Ian, Melissa's boyfriend, whom Spencer had a crush on (and had also kissed). Although the charges pressed against Ezra are dropped, he moves out of Rosewood after being fired from the school. Emily plans to go to the police to stop "A", which leads to "A" outing her to the whole school. Emily's parents threaten to send her away if she does not attend a conversion program; however, Emily realizes she can't change who she is. She begins an on-again, off-again relationship with Maya to appease her parents. When Spencer is nominated for a Golden Orchid Award for the essay she copied from her sister Melissa, "A" threatens to expose her plagiarism. Spencer's family discovers she cheated on her Golden Orchid essay. She gets into an altercation with Melissa and pushes Melissa down the stairs. Her family decides to keep the issue quiet to protect their reputation. Spencer discovers that she has rage-induced blackouts, and recalls her last fight with Alison before she went missing. Alison revealed to Spencer that she was dating Ian and had asked him to kiss Spencer in order to prove that he would do anything for her. Hearing that, Spencer pushed Ali into the woods. This revelation causes Spencer to believe she killed Alison. Hanna and Mona get into a series of fights and misunderstandings, and Hanna seeks comfort with an "uncool" boy named Lucas. Hanna receives a message from “A” warning her that Mona is not her friend. She goes to Mona's birthday party and gets humiliated, but receives a text from "A". Recognizing the number, she intends to reveal the identity of "A" to the other girls; however, she is hit by "A" in a vehicle before she can do so. The girls receive a text: "She Knew Too Much -A"
4	Unbelievable	May 27, 2008	978-0-06-088739-1	335
Hanna barely survives being hit by "A". Due to a head injury, she has lost her memory of the previous day, thus forgetting "A"'s identity. Aria informs Wilden, a police officer, that she suspects Spencer could be Alison's killer, which he refuses to believe. Emily's parents catch her with Maya at a party and send her to Iowa to live with her strict, religious relatives. She is relieved to be safe from "A", but runs away after being accused of corrupting her religious cousins. Emily returns home when she sees her parents on TV, who tell her they love her and accept her for who she is. Emily and Maya are reunited, but Trista, a girl Emily had met and flirted with in Iowa, comes to visit. Maya witnesses an-almost kiss between them the two and their relationship is shattered, and Emily is saddened further when she sees Trista and Noel hooking up at Hanna's return party. After being kicked out of Sean's house, Aria reluctantly moves in with Byron and Meredith. Meredith announces she is pregnant and that when Byron's and Ella's divorce is finalized they are to be married. While at Hollis College, Aria takes an art class and befriends Jenna, who she suspects could be "A". "A" reveals to Melissa (Spencer's sister) that Spencer stole her essay for the Golden Orchid competition, but the family keeps quiet to protect their reputation. Melissa and Spencer grow closer, and Spencer confesses that she kissed Ian and that he and Alison were secretly dating, which Melissa already knew about. When fragments of her memory from the night Alison died are restored, Spencer is horrified when it dawns on her that she may have accidentally killed Alison. She shares this with Melissa who informs her that she has a strong intuition that Spencer had nothing to do with Alison's death, which makes Spencer believe that Melissa knows more about Alison's death than she's letting on. When Melissa and Ian are questioned about their whereabouts on that night, they both inform Wilden that they were together the whole night, though Melissa seems conflicted. Mona and Hanna's friendship is restored, and to celebrate Hanna's recovery, Mona and Spencer plan a party for her. Hanna does not recall anything after she received the dress for Mona's party, completely forgetting about their fight and her kiss with Lucas. She and Lucas spend time together but she is ashamed to be seen with him as Mona believes Hanna is out of Lucas's league. Hanna does not want to lose her friendship with Mona, so she distances herself from Lucas. Spencer is surprised to discover that she enjoys Mona's company, and Mona tells her that she has been receiving messages from "A". Hanna is thrilled that Spencer approves of Mona, and they consider letting her join their clique. The Night of Hanna's return party: "A" tells Aria that Meredith has a secret job at Hooters, and she goes there with Mike, Aria's brother, only to discover that "A" was lying. Darren Wilden and several other cops are there, and Aria is tempted to tell them about "A". When Mike realizes that something is troubling his sister, he urges her to tell Wilden, and she does. On the night of Hanna's party, Aria tells Jenna what happened the night she was blinded and apologizes for not stopping Alison, but Jenna reveals that she and Alison had planned it together to get rid of Toby. Alison helped Jenna because she “understands” how siblings can be. Recently, Alison's brother, Jason, had commented on news channel that his family was messed up. Aria asks Jenna about "A", but Jenna becomes scared and quickly leaves, hinting that she knows who "A" is. Melissa confronts Spencer about seeing Ian behind her back, which Spencer denies, and when she leaves, Spencer and Mona discover another note from "A" and suspect that Melissa killed Alison because she was jealous of her relationship with Ian. They inform the others and decide to turn Melissa in. Mona drives Spencer to the police station, and Aria tells Emily and Hanna the truth about "The Jenna Thing". When Hanna says that one in four boys sexually abuse their sister, Emily tells her not to believe everything she hears, which causes Hanna's memory to return, and she is horrified when she remembers who "A" is: Mona. Spencer is hesitant to turn in Melissa, but Mona comforts her and convinces her otherwise. Moments later, Spencer receives a text from Emily telling her that Mona is "A". When she receives several more texts from the girls worrying about what Mona will do, Mona realizes they figured it out. As Aria, Emily, and Hanna go to the police station to tell Darren that Mona is "A", Mona drives Spencer to Floating Man's Quarry, where she explains she saw what happened on the night of "The Jenna Thing". When Maya moved in, she found Alison's diary in the donation bins, which contained the girls' secrets. Using the information to her advantage, she got a new phone and became "A" to get revenge on the girls for blinding Jenna. Mona reveals she and Jenna used to be friends and the night Alison set the firework that injured Jenna, Mona was also injured, leaving scars on her stomach. Spencer accuses Mona of killing Alison, but Mona says that it was Ian who killed her, as Alison had blackmailed him about their relationship. Alison had written in her last journal entry that she had given Ian an ultimatum to choose between her or Melissa, or she would tell everyone about their relationship. Spencer secretly calls Darren, who overhears her conversation with Mona and learns their location. Mona tells Spencer that she originally planned to frame her for Alison's murder, but recently grew to like her, and thus decided to frame Melissa to help Spencer. She offers Spencer to become "A" with her, as they could pin the blame on someone else. Spencer refuses and Mona attacks her. They fight on the cliff's edge, and in the struggle, Spencer accidentally pushes Mona off the cliff to her death. Aria, Emily, and Hanna arrive to the scene with Darren and the police to find Mona's body and an injured but conscious Spencer, who informs them of what happened. Hanna tries to see Mona's body but Wilden prevents her. Hanna finds Mona's spare phone and takes it with her. The girls return to Melissa's barn where they find her with Ian, and they call Wilden. Ian is arrested. News channels broadcast that Mona was threatening girls at her school for months. Aria gets a call from her mother who forgives her for hiding her father's affair, stating that their relationship was already on the decline. Hanna is informed by her mother that she is moving to Singapore for a job and Hanna's father and new step-family will move into the house. Spencer wins the Golden Orchid award and Melissa admits that she lied about Ian's whereabouts because she believed that he would never kill anyone. Ian pleads not guilty to his crime. Emily sees a familiar face in the crowd.

=== Second Arc ===
Book #	Title	Publication date	ISBN	Pages
5	Wicked	November 25, 2008	978-0-06-156607-3	310
A new "A" begins making threats. Ian denies being Ali's killer and soon is out of jail on bail waiting for his trial. Emily finds herself confused about her sexuality once again, as she now has feelings for a boy she met at Church, Christian singer Isaac. Emily tries to date Isaac without him finding out about her orientation, though "A" keeps interfering. Emily tells Isaac about Maya and he tells her he accepts her for who she is. Hanna, still shocked after discovering Mona Vanderwaal was "A", has a string of bad luck. She has issues with her stepsister Kate Randall. At a party at a hotel opening, Hanna and Kate fight over the title "Queen Bee". Hanna and Lucas break up after Hanna tells everyone at a party Kate has herpes. Hanna's father forbids her from talking to anyone except Kate. Hanna begins to believe Kate may have been working with Mona, but soon realizes they were just friends. Aria has feelings for a man, Xavier, who she met at an art show; however, he ends up dating her mother after meeting her through an online dating site, having lied about his age to Aria. Xavier tells Aria he still loves her, but she is disgusted by him. Due to what she perceives to be the risk of hurting her mother and further damaging their newly repaired relationship, Aria moves in with Meredith and Byron to avoid Xavier. After a shock at her grandmother's will reading and her family neglecting her, Spencer comes to believe she is adopted and starts searching for answers. She starts dating her class rival, Andrew, after he helps her find her supposed mother through a reuniting site. Ian visits her and insists he is innocent, he later visits her again after breaking out of jail. "A" tells Spencer not to tell Wilden about these visits. Spencer, Emily, Aria, and Hanna find Ian's body in the woods behind Spencer's house, but when they return with the police, the body is missing.
6	Killer	June 30, 2009	978-0-06-156611-0	321
Spencer receives emails from 'Ian' who claims to have been framed for Ali's murder by 'them'. The media accuses the girls of lying about finding Ian's body for attention, a claim backed by Wilden. Spencer meets a woman named Olivia Caldwell who she believes is her real mother, and attempts to move to New York. It is revealed to be a scam and Spencer loses her college money. Kate has feelings for Mike Montgomery, who was Hanna's first kiss. Hanna becomes obsessed with stealing Mike from Kate despite hating Mike now. The two go out on dates with Mike until Hanna tells Mike they must be exclusive, he agrees to this so long as she takes him to prom. Kate reveals to Hanna that she doesn't like Mike and pretended to, as she knew Hanna and Mike didn't like each other. The two get into an argument which Mike overhears and runs off, leading Hanna to realize she does like Mike. Noel Kahn helps the two reconcile and they become an official couple. Hanna discovers messages between Wilden and Jason DiLaurentis and remembers the two were once very close, with Wilden picking up Jason after a loud argument with Alison Hanna overheard, as glass had been smashed. Aria meets Jason DiLaurentis, her former crush, at a bus stop, and the two flirt before Jason freaks out and abandons her. They later go out to a bar and kiss. Aria invites Jason to a party at Radley, a children's mental hospital turned hotel, but he accuses her of playing a cruel prank on him and runs away. Later, she receives an email from Jason telling her to meet him at his house, but when she arrives there is no response, and she is chased by a rottweiler through the window. Jason discovers her and accuses her of stalking before kicking her out. Aria sees someone running away into the woods with the rottweiler. Emily has sex with her new boyfriend Isaac, whose mother finds out and banishes Emily from their house without Isaac knowing. When Emily tells Isaac he refuses to believe her and is rude, however later apologizes. Despite this, Emily breaks up with him. Throughout this, Emily has constant run-ins with an erratic Jason who almost runs her over and she receives instructive texts from "A" who sends her pictures and questions in order to figure out Alison's murder. At the opening party for Radley, a former so-called "haven for troubled youth", Emily finds proof that Jason DiLaurentis had been a patient there, and soon Hanna, Aria, and Emily all come to believe that Jason and Darren Wilden had something to do with Ali's murder. Ian Thomas confirms their suspicions through email about Darren and Jason before someone sets the woods behind Spencer's house on fire. The Liars are now confident that Ian is "A". While Aria is trying to get to Spencer's barn to show them Ali's flag from 6th grade, she finds someone trapped in the woods by the fire, saves the person, and recognizes her as Ali.
7	Heartless	January 19, 2010	978-0-06-156614-1	274
After the fire, no one believes the girls when they insist they saw Alison, and they are nicknamed the 'Pretty Little Liars' by the press. This leads to everyone except Emily believing smoke inhalation caused them to hallucinate. "A" sends Emily to an Amish group in Lancaster under a false identity, where she befriends a girl, Lucy, and helps her plan an upcoming wedding. She learns that Lucy's sister, Leah, went missing several years prior after threatening to run away with her boyfriend, although everyone - except Lucy - believes her boyfriend murdered her. Emily discovers Wilden was Leah's boyfriend and believes she is the body in the grave, not Alison's. "A" instructs her to break into Rosewood's police precinct for evidence but she is caught and arrested. Aria begins a relationship with Noel Kahn after he defends her at a party. Noel, who believes in psychics, convinces her to go to mediums with him, one of whom produces a message in Ali's handwriting stating "Ali killed Ali". This leads her to believe that Ali might have committed suicide. Whilst visiting Ali's grave at the cemetery, Aria is accosted by police and arrested. Hanna's father sends her to a clinic to prevent her eating disorder from reappearing due to stress. Here she befriends a controlling girl named Iris, who is obsessed with her previous roommate, Courtney. She insists Hanna be 'normal', leading Hanna to lie about being a 'Pretty Little Liar'. "A" leaves a newspaper revealing her identity, and Iris reveals Hanna is in the clinic to the press, causing rumors that she is clinically insane. Hanna has more dreams about Ali, which causes her to suspect that Iris had something to do with Ali's death, especially when Iris demonstrates knowledge of Ali Hanna didn't know. Iris threatens Hanna, causing her to break down in front of everyone before she is arrested by the police. "A" reveals to Spencer that her father had an affair, causing her to uncover photos of Alison's pregnant mother and realize that Ali is her half-sister. "A" sends more messages, leading Spencer to believe her mother had uncovered the affair on the night of Alison's murder and killed her. At a surprise celebration, Spencer confronts her father, only to discover her mother and Melissa had no idea. Mrs. Hastings screams at Mr. Hastings and demands a divorce. As the night devolves into chaos the police arrive and Spencer is arrested. It is revealed the Liars were all arrested for Ali's murder and that "A" has tricked each of them into believing someone else killed Ali. However, a man named Billy Ford is soon arrested for murdering Alison and an unnamed person. Scared it is Melissa, Spencer rushes home to discover Jenna Cavanaugh's body being fished out of a ditch.
8	Wanted	June 8, 2010	978-0-06-156617-2	259
Aria, Hanna, Emily and Spencer are shocked to learn of the existence of Alison's twin sister, Courtney, when she's introduced at a press conference. Courtney had spent her life in institutions due to "health issues" and her existence was kept secret by her family. It is revealed that Jason was not a patient at the Radley, but instead was visiting Courtney. She is released and sent home to Rosewood, where she attempts to resume her sister's life and begin tentative friendships with Ali's old friends. She later reveals that she's actually Alison, and that the real Courtney had pretended to be her on the night of Ali's disappearance, and that Courtney-as-Alison was the one who was killed. When she had tried to tell her family who she was, they didn't believe her because Courtney was notorious for pretending to be Ali, and sent her back to the institution in Courtney's place. Alison attempts to reconnect with all of the girls separately. 'Courtney' flirts with Emily before revealing her identity, Emily's crush on Ali is quickly reignited and she asks Alison about the kiss, Alison admits she likes Emily but begins avoiding her afterwards. Emily asks Ali out as her date to the Valentine's Day Dance, but Ali refuses and kicks Emily out of the house. At the dance, Emily grows upset with Ali after seeing her dance with other people and begins to believe she was manipulating her, until Ali meets with Emily in the bathroom and kisses her. The two start an unofficial relationship. Spencer gets to know Ali and they attempt to connect as sisters, becoming extremely close. Melissa doesn't trust Ali and attempts to stop Spencer from talking to 'Courtney', causing Spencer to slowly believe Melissa knows she isn't Courtney. Hanna's boyfriend, Mike, has humiliating items planted in his locker. When given a choice between Mike and her popularity, Hanna dumps and publicly shames Mike for a chance at re-joining Naomi's clique. Ali reveals herself to Hanna and the two plan to embarrass Kate, Naomi and Riley using messages they wrote whilst drunk. It works, and Hanna tells Naomi and Riley it was payback for dumping Ali out of their group years prior and causing her to befriend the Liars, but the pair reveal Ali was the one who dumped them. Ali meets Aria at a spot only they knew about and reveals her identity, but unlike the others Aria becomes overwhelmed by the revelation and leaves. Aria tolerates Ali, but begins to believe she is just waiting to embarrass them as she did before. After Ali invites her and the other girls to prepare for the Valentine's dance, Aria remembers all of the awful things Ali had done before her disappearance and refuses. At the dance, she hears rumors that Ali and Noel got together, and Ali suddenly slaps Noel and accuses him of kissing her. An upset Aria breaks up with him. After the dance, Ali invites the others around to her house. On the way there, Spencer gets a frantic call from her mother telling her that Melissa has disappeared. Spencer had begun to believe that her sister was the one who killed Ali and she may be after the rest of the Liars, but when they arrive at the house, it's revealed that Ali is the killer. They discover that the girl they were friends with years ago was actually Courtney-as-Alison, and the real Ali was stuck in an institution, believed to be Courtney. She had killed Courtney for ruining her life, attempted to kill the girls in the forest fire, tried to have them arrested, and is now going to kill them by setting the house on fire. They're able to escape after stumbling onto Ian's body hidden in a closet and releasing a bound Melissa, who Ali had kidnapped and was planning to kill as well. Emily is separated from the others in the chaos and is found by Alison; the two engage in a fist fight which Emily wins. Ali is trapped inside the house and it's assumed she died in the fire, although her body is never found. After learning that her ex-husband shipped Hanna off to a mental institution, Ashley Marin moves back to Rosewood and kicks Hanna's father, Isabel and Kate out of the house, thrilling Hanna. Hanna and Mike get back together. Meredith goes into labour, giving birth to a girl named Lola. Aria and Noel get back together after it is revealed that Ali kissed him, not the other way around, and Ella breaks up with Xavier after learning of his inappropriate behavior towards Aria. Spencer's father proclaims that even though he and her mother may not get back together, things are going to change for the better in their family, and Spencer and Melissa grow closer after almost being killed. Spencer and Andrew's relationship also strengthens after Ali's attempt to break them up failed. Emily buries everything she can find that reminds her of Ali at Courtney's grave, hoping she can finally find closure, but is unsure of whether the noises she hears at the cemetery are real or imagined. And somewhere, a new girl starts her senior year at an anonymous school, a girl whose name just so happens to be an anagram of Alison DiLaurentis. The reader is left wondering if Alison is alive.

=== Third Arc ===
Book #	Title	Publication date	ISBN	Pages
9	Twisted	July 5, 2011	978-0-06-208101-8	305
The book begins with the girls vacationing in Jamaica and Emily seeing a girl who she believes is Ali. The girl claims she is named Tabitha but acts strangely which confirms the girls suspicions. Throughout the rest of the book, details about the fateful vacation emerge, such as the girls pushing "Tabitha" off a building to her death. Noel, Aria's boyfriend, has an exchange student from Finland come live with him. Instead of being the boy Klaudius that Noel expected, the exchange student turns out to be a gorgeous blonde, Klaudia, who tries to steal Noel from Aria. Aria ends up accidentally pushing Klaudia off of a ski lift as an act of self-defense; however, Klaudia uses that information against Aria. By that point, Aria and Noel's relationship is shaky and uncertain. Emily meets a new girl, Chloe, who moves into the Cavanaugh's old house. They immediately become good friends, bonding over Chloe's baby sister, Grace. Emily has now given up hope of getting a swim scholarship, her only option for college. Chloe's dad offers to help, but also hits on Emily, making sexual advances towards her. Chloe walks in on her dad kissing Emily, but thinks that it's Emily who is attempting to wreck her family (her father had previously cheated). Hanna's dad runs for Senator of Pennsylvania. Patrick, somebody who works for him, offers Hanna a modeling job, but takes inappropriate photographs and threatens her with them, saying he will release them to the public. Hanna steals $10,000 from her dad to prevent his senatorial chances from being ruined, framing Jeremiah, another man who works on set. Prior to the beginning of the book, Andrew has dumped Spencer after being unable to handle the press's constant attention. Spencer's mom has begun to date Nicholas Pennythistle, the father of snobby Amelia and her brother Zach, on whom Spencer develops a crush. When they go out dancing, she kisses him, only to find out Zach is gay. When the Hastings and Pennythistles travel to New York together, Spencer and Zach drunkenly fall asleep in the same bed. During the night, Spencer had kicked off her clothes because she was hot, leaving her in her blouse and underwear. The next morning Mr. Pennythistle wakes them both up by entering the room. Their indecent clothing and close proximity leads Mr. Pennythistle to believe that they had had sex and he acts violent. Spencer tells him that Zach didn't touch her and he's gay, hoping to help, but Mr. Pennythistle becomes furious and sends Zach to military school. Zach and Spencer's friendship ends, Zach leaving Spencer with the words "Rot in hell, bitch". The girls start to get messages from a new "A", and believe it's Ali who has somehow survived the fall from the building. At the end of the book, the news shows that a teenage girl's body was found floating in the water in Jamaica. They identify this girl as Tabitha Clark from New Jersey. The cops believe her death was a tragic accident - not a murder. The girls realize they killed an innocent girl.
10	Ruthless	December 6, 2011	978-0-06-208186-5	338
It is revealed that last summer while Spencer was taking AP courses at Penn, she began taking speed as a way to help with studying. After being arrested for possession, she arranges for Hanna to help her frame her roommate, Kelsey, as a dealer. After landing the role of Lady Macbeth in the school play, the stress and guilt begin to take a toll on Spencer, causing her to have frequent hallucinations in which she is haunted by Kelsey and Tabitha. She becomes paranoid and begins to believe Kelsey is "A" and is taking revenge on her for being framed. Emily accidentally meets Kelsey at a party and is instantly smitten with her. She and Kelsey grow close, much to Spencer's disapproval. After Emily is hurt by Spencer's remarks about her love for Alison, she angrily tells Kelsey that Spencer framed her for drug possession. Depressed, Kelsey overdoses and attempts to throw herself into the quarry where Mona died, but Emily saves her and Kelsey is sent to the Preserve for treatment. While visiting Kelsey, the girls realize that Tabitha was also a patient at the Preserve and was the same age as Alison and Courtney. Hanna's father asks her to help with the social media aspect of his campaigning. She meets a boy named Liam, who she falls for, despite knowing he is the son of her father's political opponent. They break up when she learns he has been seeing multiple other girls while dating her, and reconciles with Mike. After Aria is dumped by Noel, she seeks out comfort in Ezra, in hopes of rekindling their romance. However, things are strained between them, and Aria eventually goes back into a relationship with Noel, after discovering Ezra and Klaudia being intimate. The Liars attempt to circumvent "A's" threats by coming clean about their secrets, with varied success. Meanwhile, "A" becomes more violent: shoving Emily down a hill at Stockbridge trail and sending Spencer an email showing Tabitha on the beach with a head injury, indicating that "A" was the one who disposed of Tabitha's body. "A" taunts the Liars, stating they will never discover "A"'s true identity. Kelsey is found to not be "A".
11	Stunning	June 5, 2012	978-0-06-208189-6	302
The Liars begin to suspect a woman, Gayle, might be "A", when she comes to Rosewood and begins to harass them; it is revealed that Emily backed out of a deal to let Gayle adopt her daughter in exchange for $50,000, scared of what sort of mother Gayle would be. Emily reconnects with Isaac while attempting to tell him about her pregnancy, but she fears the repercussions of such a confession. Spencer visits Princeton hoping to join an Eating Club, but "A" interferes and spikes Spencer's pot brownies with LSD and Ritalin. A member named Harper is caught with pot, which she attempts to blame on Spencer. Aria panics when she finds out Noel's father is a drag queen, and ends up putting her relationship with Noel at risk when "A" threatens to expose Noel's father's photo publicly. On a tip from "A", Hanna begins spying on Mike's new girlfriend, Colleen. Later she is publicly humiliated by "A" when she sends everyone a video of Hanna stalking Colleen. Gayle is murdered by "A" and it is revealed that she was Tabitha's stepmother. Tabitha's father speaks at Gayle's funeral, and announces that Tabitha's autopsy showed no trace of alcohol, meaning that she was murdered. He thus plans to re-open the investigation into her death, and threatens that he will find both Gayle's and Tabitha's killer, frightening the girls.
12	Burned	December 4, 2012	978-0-06-208192-6	319
It is revealed that prior to the events of Twisted, the Liars covered up Hanna's involvement in a car accident that left another girl, Madison, badly injured. While on a school-sponsored cruise in the Caribbean, the Liars uncover clues that suggest "A" is more than one person. They begin to suspect Naomi Zeigler of being "A", after she befriends Hanna (who is unaware that Madison is Naomi's cousin) and attempts to sabotage Spencer's new relationship. Aria becomes friends with a boy named Graham, only to discover he is Tabitha's ex-boyfriend, leading the Liars to believe that Naomi and Graham are working together as "A". Meanwhile, Emily falls for a stowaway, Jordan, unaware that she is a thief on the run from the authorities. After an explosion on the boat, the Liars go off on their own to bury "evidence" of their connection to Tabitha (Tabitha's locket, which "A" had planted for Noel to find). "A" tampers with their lifeboat, nearly stranding them in the middle of the ocean. The near-death experience motivates the girls to confess to killing Tabitha. However, as they make plans to come clean, they discover they were not responsible for Tabitha's death at all: She had been bludgeoned to death by "A". The Liars finally come to believe that "A" is, in fact, Alison, as Emily reveals that she may have helped Alison escape the burning Poconos house in Wanted, and now they have to track down her accomplice as well.

=== Fourth Arc ===
Book #	Title	Publication date	ISBN	Pages
13	Crushed	June 4, 2013	978-0-06-219971-3	340
Weeks before the annual Rosewood Day Prom, the four girls are under a great deal of stress. They attempt to be one step ahead of "A", who they believe is Alison, and her secret accomplice, and keep a list of their suspects. Spencer, Hanna, and Emily agree that the main suspect is Noel Kahn, Aria's boyfriend: He was on the trip to Jamaica, he went to Iceland, he was good friends with Ali (and in love with her), and he visited her in the Preserve. He also knew about the twins. Emily tries getting information of out of Ali's old friend, Iris, (who we met in Heartless). Iris tells Emily information about Ali, and at prom Iris recognizes Noel, stating he was Ali's secret boyfriend. Spencer finds an internet blogger who posts about Alison DiLaurentis theories. She meets him and ends up liking him, learning his name is Chase. He helps Spencer get information on Alison. Hanna, in an attempt to get information on a burn victim from the last book, Graham, starts volunteering at the Burn Clinic. There, Graham is in a coma and before he wakes, he dies -all the information is lost. Aria, worried and paranoid about what happened last summer, is attempting to grapple with Noel being "A". At prom, Noel admits to loving Ali, and Aria, furious, asks Noel if Ali is still alive. He says he doesn't know. While Aria is attempting to get away, Noel pins her to the ground. Spencer, Hanna, and Emily arrive and Noel flees. The morning later, Hanna gets a text from "A" saying to go to the shed at Rosewood Day. She and the three other girls go along with the police and inside find an unconscious Noel tied up to a chair. It is not revealed if Noel is dead or alive. The girls get a text, signed by "A", informing them that they've failed to make progress, Noel wasn't "A", and they are back where they started.
14	Deadly	December 3, 2013	978-0-06-219974-4	320
The book starts out as the real Alison DiLaurentis is limping out of the burning house after she tried to kill the Liars. It's seemingly said she survived with the help of "Helper A", her boyfriend. Aria visits Noel in the hospital, who survived his abduction. Agent Fuji comes to the girls after they are arrested for the crimes they have committed over the past year. The girls tell Agent Fuji about "A" and tell her that all of their charges have to be dropped. They also tell her they believe Alison is still alive and they need 24-hour protection for their family. Agent Fuji tells the girls to give her all of their "A" notes and to do as they are told. As a result of the police's interference, "A" gives the police a fake security video of the girls beating up Tabitha before she was killed. The police arrest them and tell the girls all of the texts from "A" had come from their phones. The girls are put on bail and sent home. Emily's family appear to hate her and Emily and Carolyn get into a fight. As this happens Emily's mom has a heart attack. Hanna's father wants nothing to do with her because it will hurt his Senate campaign. After a hearing, the Liars are sentenced to go to trial in Jamaica the next day. Determined to find "A" they go searching, and search a house owned by Hanna's father's office. When they enter, Nick Maxwell comes in and points a gun at the girls. He is "Helper A", Real Ali's boyfriend. The girls all know him as someone else: Spencer knows him as Phineas, a guy at Penn's summer program who sold her study drugs, Hanna knew him as Jackson, the bartender who kept on giving Madison drinks, resulting in Hanna getting in a car accident, Emily knew him as Derrick, a friend she had at her job, telling him all of her secrets, and Aria knew him as Olaf, a guy she stole The Starry Night with while vacationing in Iceland. As they realize what's happening Alison arrives with a gun and forces the girls into the basement. As they do they see a mural of Ali on the wall and are confused. Ali tells them after she kills them she will make it appear they did so to be with "Ali". Nick and Ali put on gas masks and turn on a poisonous gas, and the girls lose consciousness. The girls later wake in the hospital, and Agent Fuji tells informs them Nick Maxwell was caught, but Ali escaped. In the epilogue Ali is running away and goes to a house Nick didn't know of. She has money and reveals that she is going to lure someone else to kill with her again.
15	Toxic	June 3, 2014	978-0-06-228701-4	336
Aria and Noel break up after an argument and he begins to date Scarlet, an Ali look-alike. One of Aria's paintings is bought by a famous art collector and she begins to receive recognition from the professional art world. She soon starts dating an art journalist named Harrison, who writes a profile on her work, despite not being over Noel. After seeing Scarlet and Noel together at the Rosewood Rallies charity function, she attempts to flee before being confronted by Noel. The two kiss, though neither is sure what the kiss meant. Aria then discovers that the art collector never bought her painting, and that someone using the name 'Maxine Preptwill' had pretended to be the critic's assistant. Aria recognizes the name as one Ali used as a secret code during her friendship with Noel. However, "A"'s plan to discredit Aria backfires, after no one believes Aria orchestrated the scandal. Noel and Aria reunite and Aria is more popular than ever. Hanna is invited to play Naomi in a movie about the Liars' lives titled 'Burn It Down'. The actress playing Hanna, Hailey Blake, photographs the actor playing Mike kissing Hanna. Hailey is fired from the set after numerous poor performances, and Hanna, seeing an opportunity, suggests herself as Hailey's replacement. In an act of revenge, Hailey sends the photos of Hanna and her co-star to TMZ, exposing Hanna to Mike. Later, after seeing clips of her acting performance, Hailey realizes she was terrible in the part. She apologizes to Hanna and explains the situation to Mike, who takes Hanna back. Emily's girlfriend Jordan, who is in prison, is told by her lawyer there is a way to leave on parole. Both are ecstatic and begin making plans for a future together. Whilst doing laps in the pool, Ali appears and insists Emily declare her love for her, which Emily refuses; thus, Alison attempts to drown her and nearly succeeds. Alison runs off when Emily manages to climb out of the pool, but Emily snags Ali's hoodie in the ensuing scuffle, where she finds a receipt from a market in a nearby township. Terrified, Emily attempts to call Jordan in prison but receives some shocking news - Jordan has been found dead in her cell. Another inmate who escaped from the prison is suspected, but Emily knows that Ali did it due to her rejection. A few days later, the suspected inmate is also found murdered. Jordan's death sends Emily into a depressive spiral and she starts sleeping on the floor of her closet and considering pursuing Ali. Using the receipt Emily took the girls track down a pool house on one of Nick's parents' properties they believe Ali has been hiding out in. They set up cameras in an attempt to catch footage of Ali, however a traumatized Emily breaks into the house and destroys everything. Despite her cleaning up the mess, the cameras recorded her melt down, including threats of violence she had made towards Ali. Spencer starts a bullying forum website to help people who are being bullied and becomes reasonably well known for it. However, a group of crazed Ali fans who call themselves the Ali-Cats start harassing Spencer, particularly one named Dominick. Spencer then meets Greg, a fan of hers who she supposedly helped out of a bad place, and begins to fall for him. Spencer tells Greg about how Ali is alive and inadvertently reveals the cameras they set up to spy on Ali, only to discover he is an Ali-Cat hired by Alison herself to infiltrate the Liars, and she had given him useful information. During an event to honor disadvantaged Rosewood youth, all the girls leave early to return to the pool house only to find it covered in blood. While canvassing the house, they are met with an overwhelming smell of bleach, and find the blood mysteriously cleaned. Agent Fuji turns up the next day and while they attempt to explain Ali's crimes, Fuji reveals they've been implicated through their behavior and DNA analysis in the torture and murder of Alison.
16	Vicious	December 4, 2014	978-0-06-228704-5	357
The book starts with the Liars waiting for their trial; everyone believes they are guilty and should go to jail for Alison's death. After Jordan's murder at the hands of Alison, Emily's depression has worsened and though the girls notice, none take time to intervene. Spencer makes amends with Melissa, but her parents disown her. She meets with people who could help her flee the country before she goes to jail. Aria is happy with Noel and Hanna is happy with Mike. The Liars visit Nick in jail. He tells them Alison may be at his grandmother's house. The Liars drive there but discover nothing. They decide to spend a night in a nearby hotel before the trial the next day. The next chapter is written from Emily's perspective. After writing a suicide note for the other Liar's to read she ventures out to the sea, where she believes she may be happy. Spencer attempts to save her; however, she only injures herself. Emily is pronounced dead. At Emily's funeral, Hanna, Spencer and Aria arrive against Mr. and Mrs. Field's wishes. Hanna and Spencer get into an argument and Aria gets involved. The three end up blaming Emily's death on each other. Spencer has many hospital appointments, where she finds herself meeting her ex-boyfriend Wren. Wren apologies for cheating on her and although she tries to resist, she begins to fall for him again. After realizing that his girlfriend could be facing a life sentence, Mike proposes to Hanna and they attempt to quickly plan an extravagant wedding. The girls are fitted with trackers on their legs, but Aria attempts to flee the country. With Spencer and Hanna arguing and Aria on the run, the Liars appear guiltier than ever. Spencer considers running away like Aria. She steals some of her mother's jewels. Melissa reveals she is pregnant and her parents get mad at Spencer. Spencer contacts someone to help her run away. Meanwhile, Noel finds Aria and they attempt to stay off the radar together. However, on their way to Japan, they are caught and brought home in time for Hanna's wedding. Hanna starts to miss her friends and orders Aria, Spencer, and Emily headbands to wear to her wedding. She finally stands up to her father and disinvites him from her wedding. At the wedding, Hanna and Spencer, who has started a relationship with Wren despite her plans to leave town, make up, and the remaining Liars are reunited. After being stopped from running away by Wren, Spencer is called to court, where she meets Aria and Hanna. There they meet with the lawyers and, to their complete shock, a very proud and alive Emily. The book then returns to Emily prior to writing her suicide note. Struggling to sleep in the motel, she goes back to Nick's grandmother's house where she finds an envelope addressed to "Day" with an address on. A plan forms in Emily's mind, and she wades into the ocean to fake her death. Though distraught about leaving her friends, Emily is now a few steps ahead of Ali. Emily travels to the address where she then finds Mrs. DiLaurentis. Realizing that Mrs. D had been protecting Ali, Emily calls the police and distracts Mrs. DiLaurentis with a conversation about how she was keeping Alison hidden. This led to Mrs. DiLaurentis and a slightly overweight and brown-haired Alison getting into a heated argument with Emily, in which she is threatened with a gun; however, Emily manages to fight off both Ali and her mother just in time for the police to come and arrest Alison. Then, returning to the Liars reuniting with Emily, they see Alison being arrested and learn they are free. The epilogue skips six months. Spencer is still happily with Wren. Aria and Noel's relationship has been mended. Hanna was given her role back on 'Burn it Down' and all the girls are at the premiere. Emily is still emotional, but with Alison in prison she no longer needs to worry and finally cuts ties with her family. The girls are seen having fun with their "A" free lives, living as innocent people, going to school and living with their significant others.

=== Companion novels ===
4.5	Pretty Little Secrets	January 3, 2012	978-0-06-212591-0	464
Set between Unbelievable and Wicked, the book is told from the point of view of the second "A", Alison DiLaurentis, as she spies on the girls during their Christmas vacation. The novel is divided into a series of four short stories, with each one focusing on the exploits of a specific girl. Spencer: Spencer and her family go to Nana Hastings' mansion in Florida, and Spencer falls in love with a tennis player named Colin. Melissa attempts to help Spencer win Colin's heart, but Colin takes interest in Melissa. During the trip, Spencer and her mother run into Mrs. DiLaurentis several times, and Spencer is confused by her mother's strange behavior around Mrs. DiLaurentis. Spencer decides to fight for Colin. After Colin dumps Melissa to go out with her, Spencer and Melissa discover that Colin is 33 years old and has a wife and child. Spencer and Melissa decide to team up to get revenge on Colin by putting crushed Viagra in his Aminospa vitamin water before his important tennis game. Spencer worries that someone has been following her. Melissa and Spencer briefly make up in this, hence the sisters' wary friendship in Wicked. Emily: Emily is asked to go undercover as Santa Claus at the mall to catch four girls working as elves who are suspected of vandalizing Christmas decorations around town, including Emily's mom's ceramic baby Jesus. The four girls, who call themselves the "Merry Elves", take a liking to Emily, and it's revealed that one of the girls, Cassie, was close with Alison. Emily accompanies the girls on their biggest prank yet, but Emily's mom uses her phone to track her, and the Merry Elves get caught. The elves forgive Emily after she bails them out of jail. Everyone realizes the true meaning of Christmas, but Emily can't shake the weird feeling that someone is following her. It is revealed that "A" is blonde as Emily sees a blonde figure run off. Hanna: Hanna joins a boot camp after thinking she gained too much weight at a holiday party. She develops feelings for the instructor, Vince. She develops a rivalry with Dinah, another girl who also likes Vince. She and Dinah become friends after catching Kate making out with the mall's new Santa (prior to Emily), something which Hanna photographs. After agreeing to stop chasing Vince, she celebrates by going out for drinks with Dinah, where Dinah admits she knew Alison. Hanna goes home drunk, causing her to oversleep. As she arrives at boot camp, she discovers Vince and Dinah kissing, revealing Dinah pretended to be friends with Hanna. Hanna flees the scene, devastated, and is confronted by Kate, who, after receiving a tip-off, followed Hanna around, taking unflattering photos of her at boot camp, which she threatens to put on Facebook. Hanna counterattacks by showing Kate the pictures of her and Santa, causing Kate to back off. Hanna improves her relationship with her father, who gives Hanna her grandmother's Cartier locket for Christmas/Hanukkah. Hanna has a happy Christmas/Hanukkah, despite the fact that she thinks someone other than Kate has been watching her every move. Aria: Aria goes with her father and Mike to Bear Claw Resort, but leaves to go back home after finding out that Byron invited Meredith along as well. Upon arriving at home, Aria's surprised to see Halbjorn, an old boyfriend of hers from Iceland. Halbjorn tells her that he's running from the Icelandic police because he protested the demolition of a puffin sanctuary. Unfortunately, his travel visa only lasts for a week. Aria proposes the idea of marrying him, and the two head off to Atlantic City to elope. At the hotel, they attend a magic show involving two panthers, which greatly angers Halbjorn, who cares a lot about the environment. After getting married the following day, which requires Aria to forge her mother's signature and lie about her age, they go to where the panthers are kept. After convincing Halbjorn not to release the panthers, they go back to the hotel. The next morning, Aria wakes up to find Halbjorn gone and his clothes missing as well. On the lobby's TV, Aria sees that Halbjorn released the panthers. Aria goes to the courthouse and confesses to lying about her age and forging her mother's signature, making the marriage null and void. Upon returning to Rosewood, she is joined by Mike and Byron, who know nothing about her marriage. As they watch TV, it shows that Halbjorn has been caught and he's done similar things in the past, including trying to blow up a demolition office. Aria's satisfied with breaking up with him, but is paranoid about someone following her. In Wicked, it's briefly stated that Aria and Meredith did converse about the baby. The book ends with a sign-off from the new "A", (as always) who says that the Liars' lives are going to get a lot worse. All of which comes true...
0.5	Ali's Pretty Little Lies	January 2, 2013	978-0-06-223336-3	304
Before there was "A", there was "Alison DiLaurentis". Boys wanted to date her, girls wanted to be her and somebody wanted her dead. When Alison and Courtney DiLaurentis were younger they were inseparable, but as they grew up Alison became more and more resentful of her prettier, more popular, and smarter twin. She began to mentally abuse Courtney and make her pretend to be Alison, causing her to arrive to Ali's classes and introduce herself as Alison. One day, Alison manipulated Courtney into pretending to strangle her, causing the two twins to be examined for possible mental illnesses. Courtney insisted that she was forced, but due to a lack of evidence and her panicked nature, she is diagnosed with Paranoid Schizophrenia and sent off to a mental hospital. In sixth grade, Courtney is allowed a visit to Rosewood, where the DiLaurentis's have relocated, and dresses up similarly to Alison and steals her signature 'A' ring. She sees Emily, Hanna, Spencer and Aria arguing and goes to talk to them, causing her parents to believe she is actually Alison and send "Courtney" back to the mental hospital, unknowingly switching the two. "Alison" begins her new life, dropping Alison's old clique and befriending the four as well as starting to date an older boy, Nick Maxwell. "Alison" begins to manipulate those around her. Spencer failed to invite her to a party, so "Alison" tells Ian she'll kiss him if he kisses Spencer, then after he kisses Spencer, she blackmails Spencer with this knowledge. "Alison" discovers Hanna has a new friend named Josie who likes to speak about her behind her back, so she forces Hanna to watch Josie kissing Sean Ackard at a party. "Alison" sees Byron cheating on Aria's mother with Meredith, so purposefully leads Aria to see the two together. "Alison" realizes Emily loves her, and reads letters Emily writes to "Alison" without actually sending them. Nick breaks up with "Alison", causing her spiral and become nasty towards the Liars. The real Alison returns home, causing Courtney to become paranoid and act strange. At the sleepover, Courtney sees Alison through the window, and then gets into an argument with Spencer before storming out. Spencer chases after her, and after arguing more, Spencer pushes her over, causing Courtney to flee. Alison appears and the two start fighting, but after Courtney wins, someone emerges and pushes her into a hole. Alison and the mysterious figure (revealed in the series to be Nick Maxwell) begin to fill the hole. Just as she suffocates to death, Courtney recognizes the accomplice, last thinking "why?" Alison returns to her parents, but they believe she is Courtney masquerading as Alison because she forgot to retrieve her 'A' ring from Courtney's body. After the Liars tell them that "Alison" is missing, and Courtney's body is hidden by unaware construction workers, the DiLaurentis's believe "Courtney" has killed "Alison" and send her back to the mental institution. After realizing the Liars are the reason for the original mistaken identity (Courtney went out to talk to them as Alison), Alison vows revenge as she is taken away. Note: This book is titled Ali's Pretty Little Lies but it's actually about her twin sister, Courtney, who pretended to be Alison because she didn't want to go to a psych ward. This book reveals a lot of secrets.
