= Sydney Park (actress) =

American actress (born 1997)

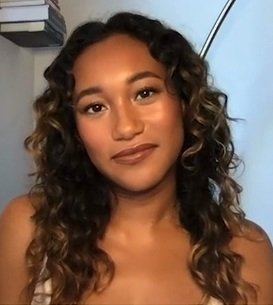
- Park in an interview for AMFM Studios in 2021
- Born: October 31, 1997 (age 28); Berkeley, California, U.S.
- Occupations: Actress; comedian
- Years active: 2003–present

Sydney Park (born October 31, 1997) is an American actress and comedian. She is best known for her roles as Cyndie in AMC's The Walking Dead, Gabby Phillips in Instant Mom, Caitlin Park-Lewis in Pretty Little Liars: The Perfectionists and Makani Young in the Netflix film There's Someone Inside Your House.

== Career ==
Park got her start in 2003 when she was the "Youngest comedian to ever perform at the famous Hollywood Improv (now The Improv)". In 2006, she auditioned for the first season of American reality competition America's Got Talent under the stage name Syd the Kid, where she had advanced on to the semi-finals. Park had to drop out due to her acting career. She made her television debut on the teen sitcom That's So Raven in 2006.

In 2010, Park was hired to play Ellie Danville, the adopted daughter of Detective Jo Danville on CSI: NY. In 2010, Park also starred as "Tootsie Roll" in the independent dark-comedy Spork.

From 2013 to 2015, Park starred as Gabby in the Nick at Nite show Instant Mom.

In 2016, Park began portraying Cyndie on The Walking Dead.

In 2017, Park starred as Meredith in the supernatural horror film Wish Upon. In the same year, she starred on the YouTube science fiction series Lifeline.

In March 2018, it was announced the Park would be starring in the new television series Pretty Little Liars: The Perfectionists as Caitlin Park-Lewis. It premiered in March 2019 on Freeform. In September 2019, Freeform canceled the series after one season.

In 2019, Park appeared as Winter in the third season of the Netflix horror-comedy series Santa Clarita Diet. In the same year, she was cast as Makani Young in the slasher film There's Someone Inside Your House, and as Kiera Pascal in the feminist film Moxie directed by Amy Poehler, both released by Netflix in 2021.

In May 2021, Park was announced to be starring as a lead in the romantic drama First Love alongside Hero Fiennes Tiffin.

== Personal life ==
Park was born in the United States to a Korean father and African-American mother.

== Filmography ==
=== Film ===
Key
†	Denotes films that have not yet been released

Year	Title	Role	Notes
2010	Spork	Tootsie Roll	
2017	Wish Upon	Meredith McNeil	
2020	Dead Reckoning	Felicity	
2021	Moxie	Kiera Pascal	
2021	There’s Someone Inside Your House	Makani Young / Makani Sun-woo	
2022	First Love	Ann	
2025	You, Me & Her	Angela	
2026	Scary Movie	Dei Meeks	
TBA	Halloween Store	Zoe Thom	

=== Television ===
Year	Title	Role	Notes
2006	That's So Raven	Sydney	3 episodes
2007	Entourage	Girl Scout	Episode: "Gotcha!"
2007	The Hill	Girl Scout	Unsold television pilot (ABC)
2008	The Sarah Silverman Program	Stella	Episode: "Pee"
2008	Hannah Montana	Kelsey DiAria	Episode: "Ready, Set, Don't Drive!"
2008	Gary Unmarried	Mikhela	Episode: "Gary Gives Sasha His Full Attention"
2010	Sons of Tucson	Vanessa	Episode: "Dog Days of Tucson"
2010–2013	CSI: NY	Ellie Danville	4 episodes
2013–2015	Instant Mom	Gabby Phillips	Main role
2014	The Thundermans	Cassandra	Episode: "Shred It Go"
2015	Bella and the Bulldogs	Mia	Episode: "Root for Newt"
2015	Nicky, Ricky, Dicky & Dawn	Randee	Episode: "Mall in the Family"
2015	One Crazy Cruise	Piper Bauer	Television film
2015	Nickelodeon's Ho Ho Holiday	Herself	Television special
2016–2019	The Walking Dead	Cyndie	Recurring role (Season 7–10); 12 episodes
2016–present	The HALO Effect	Herself	Host
2017–2020	Spirit Riding Free	Pru Granger	Main voice role
2017	Lifeline	Norah Hazelton	Main role
2019	Santa Clarita Diet	Winter	5 episodes
2019	Knight Squad	Princess Eliza	2 episodes
2019	Pretty Little Liars: The Perfectionists	Caitlin Park-Lewis	Main role
2022	DMZ	Tenny	3 episodes
2022	Big City Greens	Tina (voice)	Episode: "Pizza Deliverance"
2023–2026	Will Trent	Young Amanda Wagner	4 episodes

=== Music videos ===
Year	Title	Artist(s)	Director
2022	"Not Giving You Up"	Big Time Rush	Erik Rojas
