= The Lying Game season 1 =

The Lying Game
- Season 1
- Season 1 promotional poster
- No. of episodes: 20

Release
- Original network: ABC Family
- Original release: August 15, 2011 – March 5, 2012

Season chronology
- Next → Season 2

The first season of The Lying Game, based on the book series of the same name by Sara Shepard. The series premiered on August 15, 2011 and concluded on March 5, 2012 on ABC Family. It follows long-lost twins Emma Becker and Sutton Mercer. Separated under mysterious circumstances, Sutton was adopted by the wealthy Mercer family in Phoenix, while Emma grew up in the foster system. When the twins reunite as teenagers, they keep it a secret. While Sutton goes in search of the truth, Emma takes over her life and discovers more secrets and lies than she could have imagined.

It premiered to 1.39 million viewers and the summer finale accumulated 1.28 million viewers. The Lying Game went on hiatus and returned with its winter premiere on January 5, 2012, and has hit its series high with 1.8 million viewers and has continued for three consecutive weeks.

== Cast and characters ==
=== Main cast ===
- Alexandra Chando as Emma Becker and Sutton Mercer
- Andy Buckley as Ted Mercer
- Allie Gonino as Laurel Mercer
- Alice Greczyn as Madeline "Mads" Rybak
- Sharon Pierre-Louis as Nisha Randall (Note: Sharon Pierre-Louis is credited as a series regular up until episode 10. From episode 11 onwards, she is no longer credited.)
- Kirsten Prout as Charlotte "Char" Chamberlin (Note: Kirsten Prout is credited as a series regular up until episode 10. From episode 11 through to episode 12, she is credited as a guest star and episode 13 onwards, she is no longer credited.)
- Blair Redford as Ethan Whitehorse
- Helen Slater as Kristin Mercer

=== Recurring cast ===
- Adrian Pasdar as Alec Rybak
- Tyler Christopher as Dan Whitehorse
- Christian Alexander as Thayer Rybak
- Randy Wayne as Justin Miller
- Charisma Carpenter as Annie "Rebecca" Sewell
- Ben Elliott as Derek Rogers
- Adam Brooks as Baz
- Misha Crosby as Ryan Harwell
- Rick Malambri as Eduardo Diaz
- Sydney Barrosse as Phyllis Chamberlin

=== Guest cast ===
- Stacy Edwards as Annie Hobbs
- Gil Birmingham as Ben Whitehorse
- Kenneth Miller as Travis Boyle
- Dora Madison Burge as Lexi Samuels
- Jennifer Griffin as Dr. Hughes
- Yara Martinez as Theresa Lopez
- Craig Nigh as Officer Harry
- Katherine Willis as Nancy Rogers

== Episodes ==
No. overall	No. in season	Title	Directed by	Written by	Original release date	U.S. viewers (millions)
1	1	"Pilot"	Mark Piznarski	Teleplay by : Charles Pratt, Jr.	August 15, 2011	1.39
Prior to the events that occurred in the pilot, Emma Becker and Sutton Mercer found out that they were identical twins that were separated at birth. Sutton was adopted by a wealthy family at a young age. Emma was placed in the foster care system her whole life. After her foster brother, Travis, frames her for stealing from her foster mother, Emma goes on the run and decides to meet up with Sutton. Already having leads on their birth parents, Sutton wants to go to Los Angeles and find more information about them, convincing Emma to take her place for the next few days. In Sutton's place, Emma manages to slightly confuse the Mercers (although they don't suspect a thing) and break up with Sutton's cheating "fake" boyfriend. Along the way, Emma meets Ethan, Sutton's secret boyfriend who soon figures out her secret. After Sutton mysteriously doesn't show up at their scheduled meeting place, they both agree to continue the charade until Sutton returns. Someone breaks into Sutton's room and steals her laptop. A scene is then shown of Sutton, sitting in a car, listening to the radio. The car door suddenly opens and Sutton lets out a gasp.
2	2	"Being Sutton"	Wendey Stanzler	Charles Pratt, Jr.	August 22, 2011	1.47
With no word from Sutton, Emma must continue to take her place until she returns from Los Angeles. She also learns of "the lying games", a series of uploaded pranks Sutton and her two best friends used to play. Emma takes dancing lessons from Ethan to take Sutton's place at an upcoming father-daughter dance. Meanwhile, Laurel becomes suspicious of the new-and-improved Sutton and even gets a bit jealous. She later catches Emma with Ethan and assumes that Sutton is involved in a relationship with him. Emma defends Sutton's best friends, including standing up for Char against her over-the-top mother and starts to bond with them. At the dance, Emma (as Sutton) is thrown into a fight with Madeline and her drunk father, resulting in Ethan slamming him against a wall as a way of defending Emma. At home, Sutton's mother finds Emma's cell phone and confusingly answers a call from her foster brother, asking for an "Emma". Later, Sutton video-chats Emma, telling her that she has faced a few setbacks in L.A. and has to stay in town for a few more days. Sutton also discovers that Ethan has found out about Emma, whom she had never spoken to him about. As she logs off, it is shown that Sutton is actually working with Thayer, Madeline's brother who's trying to make it in L.A. despite his father's disapproval. Laurel tells her parents about Sutton and Ethan after her father becomes suspicious of him after what happened at the dance and they go upstairs to confront her about it, only to find that Ethan was in her room. At the end of the episode, it is revealed that Madeline's father was behind the theft of Sutton's laptop, meaning that he also has some secrets of his own.
3	3	"Double Dibs"	Michael Grossman	Stacy Rukeyser	August 29, 2011	1.31
After the Mercers find out that Sutton is dating Ethan, Emma (as Sutton) suggests that he come for dinner so that they could get to know him better. Ethan reluctantly agrees and they both decide to keep the relationship private. Laurel meets a new guy in town, Justin and quickly falls for him. Later at school, Char also meets Justin in the hallway and 'calls dibs' on him, a term Sutton coined that is used to reserve boys. It is obvious that Justin has feelings for Laurel, but because of Char, Laurel is forced to stepped back and she seeks advice from Sutton, who wouldn't normally be helpful in this type of situation. Meanwhile in Los Angeles, Sutton and Thayer find Ruth Peterson, who was listed as Sutton and Emma's birth mother on their birth certificate and find out that she was paid to sign the papers, telling them that she isn't their real mother. Ruth also lets them know that both Sutton and Emma were adopted into wealthy families before she lost contact with them. They go on to find the Websters, Emma's former adoptive parents. They are then informed that while the Websters did in fact adopt Emma, a woman claiming to be Ruth came back for her and they had to legally hand her over. Sutton and Thayer begin to suspect that the Mercers knew something was going on all along. At the Mercer family dinner, Dan unexpectedly drops by to take Ethan home, saying that it was a family emergency. It turns out that Madeline's father's accomplice had framed Ethan for stealing Sutton's laptop. Because of this, Emma no longer knows who she can trust and begins to doubt her bond with Ethan. When they return to Thayer's place, Sutton and Thayer find out that the house had been broken into and that the laptop had been used. When the screen zooms out, it is revealed that Thayer's father is in L.A. and is spying on them from the yard, indicting that he was the one who had broken in. At Char's party, Justin tells Sutton that he likes Laurel, and Sutton gives him her address since Laurel planned on staying home that night. He later shows up at her door and Laurel agrees to go on a date. Emma goes to apologize to Ethan and they share a romantic moment, although they pull back because Ethan was supposed to be in love with the real Sutton, not Emma. Back at the Mercer house, Sutton video-chats with Emma and shows Emma a picture of her as a baby, with her birth mother, a photo which was given to Sutton by Mr. Webster.
4	4	"Twinsense and Sensibility"	David Jackson	Mark Driscoll	September 5, 2011	1.46
During a nightly run, Emma runs into Alec, who seems to have been following her, and he offers her a ride home. Alec tells Ted that he needs to keep an eye on her to prevent her from finding out any sort of information. Meanwhile, Char seems to believe that Sutton, Mads, and herself are drifting apart as best friends: Sutton sides with Laurel when it comes to who should date Justin and Mads is having a secret affair with her ballet instructor without telling her. This sudden paranoia comes from Nisha, who after joining ballet at her tennis coach's request, tries to break up their friendship. Back in L.A., Sutton and Thayer are able to zoom in on the old photograph of Emma and their birth mother and find out that it was taken in rural Fillmore, CA. Emma experiences a nightmare in which she is trapped in an unknown place and is unable to breathe, assuming that she must have been drowning. Sutton, who had also experienced the same nightmare in the past, encourages Emma to tap into her childhood memories, as Sutton thinks that Emma is the key to finding their birth mother. Laurel stages a confession in which she takes the blame for stealing Sutton's laptop as opposed to Ethan, who was to be on trial for the crime, saying that it was to repay Sutton for setting her up with Justin. Later, when Emma meets up with Ethan in the middle of the night, he tries to help her recover her memories to no avail. When Emma sees the sparks from their fire rise into the starry sky, she suddenly remembers that she wasn't drowning in her nightmare at all - she was trapped in a fire when she was young. With this information in hand, Sutton and Thayer are able to locate the burnt home in Fillmore and Emma is able to remember many details of her childhood home, from the swing in the doorway to the stars painted on the ceiling. Sutton then finds the name "Annie Hobbs" also painted on the ceiling and Emma immediately thinks that it was the name of their mother. Alec and Ted are beginning to get more suspicious of Sutton and it is clear that they are hiding something about Annie and the girls' past, while Kristin seems to not know anything about the situation at all.
5	5	"Over Exposed"	Elodie Keene	Tamar Laddy	September 12, 2011	1.30
As the homecoming dance is approaching, Emma (as Sutton) is pressured to run for homecoming queen. She initially drops out of the race, but after realizing that Char and Mads have done a lot on her campaign, and the fact that it would be too suspicious for her to not go through with it, she reluctantly agrees to run against Nisha. Laurel's boyfriend Justin is also running for homecoming court and she enlists herself as his campaign manager. In L.A., Sutton and Thayer continue the search for Annie, but get a bit discouraged when they find out that there are hundreds of women with the name "Annie Hobbs" in the United States. When Ted and Emma are going through his old high school photos, he comes across a picture of his younger self, Ted, and a mystery girl and proceeds to tear it out of the album. Ted and Kristin find out that Emma is actually a very talented artist and they begin to wonder if any of her birth parents had the same skills. When Eduardo comes to Mads' house to talk about the status of her relationship, Alec comes home early and she hides him a closet. While in hiding, Eduardo overhears a phone conversation between Alec and an unknown nurse. Alec tells her to watch out for Sutton if she ever comes looking for Annie. Meanwhile, Sutton is clearly upset when Emma informs her that she is running for homecoming queen in her place and reminds her that she will take her life back. When Sutton rants to Ethan about Emma taking over her life, he defends Emma and tells her that she most likely never had the intention of telling the world about their relationship and breaks it off with her. At the homecoming dance, Sutton and Justin win the title of homecoming queen and king. During the king-and-queen dance, Ethan shows up and cuts in, asking Emma for a dance. They then share a kiss in the middle of the dance floor, officially publicizing their relationship. Alec receives a picture message of Mads and Eduardo (most likely from Nisha) and confronts Mads. When she admits that Eduardo was indeed inside their house earlier, he goes to confront him about the phone call that he might have overheard, only to be interrupted by Mads at the door. When Sutton sees the homecoming photos online, she stares at screen in disbelief when she comes across a picture of Emma and Ethan's kiss. As revenge, Sutton begins to make out with Thayer, who obviously had feelings for her despite the fact that she had a boyfriend. Emma finds the photo that Ted hid and figures out that it was a picture of Ted, Alec, and Annie as teenagers. At the end of the episode in an unknown hospital, the girls' mother, Annie, is shown furiously painting a portrait of twin girls, while many other like portraits are seen in the background.
6	6	"Bad Boys Break Hearts"	Fred Gerber	R. Lee Fleming, Jr.	September 19, 2011	1.19
While exchanging "Annie" information with Sutton, Emma finds out that Sutton has been staying with Thayer in L.A. and suspects that they are romantically involved, although Sutton is technically still dating Ethan. Emma confronts Ethan about the kiss and tells him that they'll never work, as she isn't who she says she is and he is dating her twin sister. Laurel and her parents invite Justin and his parents over for a barbecue, but after he continues to give excuses, Laurel decides to pay his house a visit. It turns out that Justin didn't live at the address he provided to the school and this leads Laurel to investigate what exactly is going on with her boyfriend. Sutton is using Thayer as revenge in L.A. while Thayer continues to pour his feelings out towards her. They find an art gallery that takes contributions from an artist named Annie Hobbs and are convinced that she's the one that they've been looking for. After thinking about what Emma said, Ethan breaks up with Sutton to date her, although to the rest of the world, they're still the same person. Meanwhile, backlash from Madeline and Eduardo's flirtationship continues as Mads finds out that Eduardo quit his choreographing job and is leaving town. She suspects that this has something to do with the conversation that he had with her father, and while Eduardo confirms this, he was sworn to secrecy about what exactly went on. Following Emma (as Sutton)'s suggestion, Laurel drives around Justin's suspected neighborhood and finds out that he's actually a runaway orphan trying to make it through life playing golf. Later, Emma finally decides to tell Ethan about Sutton cheating on him with Thayer, but his reaction wasn't at all what she expected and he breaks up with her for not telling her as soon as she found out. While at Char's house helping her prepare for her date with Derek (Alec's partner-in-crime), Emma sees a picture of Annie on the wall and confronts Phyllis about it, only to have her freak out and tell her that Annie moved to L.A. after Ted and Alec "broke her heart." Derek hears this and reports it to Alec. Back in L.A., Thayer is upset that Sutton is still hung over Ethan and tells her that he's leaving for a few days and that she better leave before he comes back. Emma talks to Kristin about Annie and she openly talks about what she knew about her (which was very little), much to Ted's surprise, who was eavesdropping from the hallway. Mads finds out that Eduardo had been in a car accident and is in critical condition, calling Emma (as Sutton) and Char to the hospital for support. Ethan accidentally talks about an "Emma" in front of Char, leading her to believe that he was cheating on Sutton (which is really Emma) with another girl. At the hospital, all the cards are laid out on the table as Char tells Emma (as Sutton) about Ethan's "cheating", Ethan arrives to explain the situation to a very confused Char, Thayer is about to blow Sutton & Emma's secret out of anger, and Ethan punches Thayer for getting with Sutton. In the last scene, the real Sutton is shown arriving at Dowinger Clinic, looking for Annie. The receptionist falsely tells her that Annie isn't there (as she was forewarned by Alec) and Sutton goes exploring within the clinic anyway. She finds Annie sitting in her room and as she whispers "Mom", someone grabs her from behind, to Annie's horror.
7	7	"Escape from Sutton Island"	John Scott	Stacy Rukeyser	September 26, 2011	1.06
Sutton has been held hostage at the mental hospital where Annie Hobbs is being kept. Dr. Hughes calls Alec and tells him that she has the "Sutton Mercer" that he warned her about locked up. Alec then tells her to keep an eye on her because the real Sutton (actually Emma) was in a Phoenix hospital with him. After a series of misunderstandings, Dr. Hughes thinks that Sutton is actually Emma Becker pretending to be Sutton Mercer and doesn't catch on to the fact that they are twins. At the hospital, Mads overhears Emma, Ethan, and Thayer talking about Sutton, which then leads to broken trust between Emma (as Sutton), Mads, and Char. Mads suspects that Emma (as Sutton) has been keeping secrets from her and their friendship is strained when it matters the most. Ethan begins to show signs of jealousy when he sees Emma exchanging search information with Thayer. Emma, however, is not fully convinced that Ethan is completely over Sutton after what happened at the hospital. Alec is getting more and more suspicious of Emma (as Sutton) and tries to keep everyone away from Eduardo, who might know a secret of his or two. Meanwhile, Laurel convinces herself that Justin is "the one" and wants to take their relationship to the next step, asking her sister for advice (although unlike Sutton, Emma isn't experienced in that field at all). Thayer gets Char to talk to her new boyfriend, Derek (Alec's undercover accomplice), about why he's been exchanging multiple phone calls with Alec. Emma and Thayer hack into Ted's computer to find a password for the hospital doors after visitation hours to hopefully get more information from Eduardo. At the door, Emma runs into Ethan, who won't leave her alone, saying that he's only looking out for her. She also runs into Mads and Char, who demand to know why she's sneaking around, especially with Ethan, who they still think cheated on her with "Emma." Eduardo is in a critical state and the girls are forced out of the hospital. Alec had also paid him a visit, allowing him to keep seeing Mads as long as he doesn't say a word about the phone call he overheard. Back at Char's house, Emma (as Sutton) decides to come clean to Mads and Char (to Ethan and Thayer's concern) and tells them that she's been looking for her birth mother and that Alec has been keeping vital information about her. Mads is also shocked to find out that her father paid Eduardo to leave town, leading to his tragic accident, although their important conversation is cut short when Alec walks in to check up on his daughter. At the Dowinger clinic, Sutton gets a male nurse to let her out of her room for 15 minutes to meet Annie. Annie recognizes Sutton and Sutton is eager to ask her questions about their adoption, Ted & Alec, and why she's been in hiding. Annie reveals that either Ted or Alec told her that Emma had died that day in the Fillmore house fire and she had blamed herself all these years, driving her to insanity. When Sutton tells her that Emma was indeed alive and taking her place in Arizona, Annie goes crazy and calls security on a heartbroken Sutton. Ted and Kristin find Laurel in bed with Justin through a phone-tracking device. In the ending scene, Emma is getting dressed for bed when she finds Travis, her foster brother from Las Vegas, in her room and is shocked to find out that he knows about her being a twin.
8	8	"Never Have I Ever"	Norman Buckley	Mark Driscoll	October 3, 2011	1.23
Sutton is being held under multiple charges at the Las Vegas Juvenile Detention Center, mostly due to Emma. Madeline finds out that Eduardo has moved to an anonymous hospital. After being exposed by her parents, Laurel convinces them to find Justin a place to stay so that he can stay in Phoenix. Travis wants Emma to help him steal from the Mercers and Emma stalls him with Char's costume jewelry. Ethan tries to make amends with Emma, but she continues to push him away due to Travis being in town. Annie calls Alec from the mental clinic and asks him about Emma, the daughter that she thought she had unintentionally killed. He tells her to drop the situation and that she's living in a better place. At Justin's new living space at the country club, Ted notices a crate of his things and almost looks at it, only to be detoured onto another topic by Justin. Travis continues to make sexual advances towards Emma and one night, Ethan catches Travis kissing Emma. Not knowing who Travis was, Ethan starts to ignore Emma out of jealousy. Meanwhile, Laurel and Emma host a small house party while the Mercers are away at the plastic surgeons convention. Thayer invites Ethan to the party, telling Emma that they need to make up since he thinks they are perfect for one another. Emma reveals her current emotions to Ethan, although he doesn't show that he feels the same way anymore. Laurel, Justin, Char, Derek, Mads, Thayer, Ethan, and Emma all start to play "Never Have I Ever." At the convention, Ted meets up with an old high school friend who thinks that Kristin's name is Annie. This raises some red flags for Kristin about her husband. After the game, Char, Derek, Mads, and Thayer all head home, while Laurel leaves with Justin to his place. A slightly drunk Emma makes moves on Ethan, who turns her down. In the middle of the night, Sutton tries to call home from jail, although Emma is too slow to answer and she doesn't want to leave a message. Emma finds Travis lurking outside of the Mercer home and tells her that he found out about the fake jewelry. He almost sexually assaults her, but Ethan manages to knock him out. After telling Ethan about everything that had been going on lately, and it is implied that they have reconciled. Back at home, Kristin becomes obsessed with finding out more about Annie after her name was dropped at the convention and this leads to Ted becoming paranoid about keeping his secrets hidden. Ethan threatens Travis into leaving town. Sutton writes an angry letter back home, telling her parents about Emma taking her place. Emma, Ethan, and Thayer find out that Sutton had been held at the detention center in Las Vegas, but had just been bailed out by an anonymous donor. Justin is shown holding a picture of the Mercer family in his room that he tore out from their family photo album. Annie has run away from the mental clinic. On her release day, Sutton is picked up by Lexi, Emma's best friend, who had mistaken her for Emma. Alec sees all of this from his car across the street and he was most likely the anonymous person who bailed Sutton (presumably Emma) out of the juvenile detention center.
9	9	"Sex, Lies and Hard Knocks High"	Joe Lazarov	R. Lee Fleming, Jr.	October 10, 2011	1.10
Sutton (as Emma) stays with Emma's best friend Lexi in Las Vegas after she is released from jail. She is later aggressively confronted by Emma's former foster mother, Clarice, who was most upset about not receiving any more money after her fostering license was taken away when Emma fled town. Emma and Ethan overhear Ted and Kristen arguing about whether or not to "tell Sutton the truth." They then listen in on a phone conversation between Ted and Alec. This prompts Emma to investigate what Kristen might know. Laurel's lies to her parents about her and Justin are exposed and this causes a rift between the four of them until Emma gives her a little advice about family honesty. Alec is unhappy about Derek's growing bond with Char (which was supposed to be fake so he could spy on Sutton) and tells him to break up with her on their tenth day anniversary, which he does to Char's surprise. Emma suspects that Alec had something to do with it. Back in Vegas, Sutton is looking for a way back to Phoenix, but doesn't have any money for a bus ticket. After giving Emma's image a makeover, Sutton catches the attention of some boys at Emma's school and they invite her and Lexi to a casino party. Sutton sees this as an opportunity for a way out. A person named "Annie" calls Char in Phoenix to talk, but Phyllis grabs the phone before she could say anything. It is revealed that she is Phyllis' younger sister whom she had stopped contact with over the years. When Char tells this to Mads, Derek is shown eavesdropping in the background. He later meets up with Alec and tells him that he'll only tell him what he knows if he could get back with Char. At the casino party, Sutton manages to get the money she needs after a series of "extremely lucky" rounds of blackjack. The male nurse back at the Dowinger Clinic contacts Sutton to tell her that Annie had gone to find her. In the end, Laurel decides to be honest with her mother, bringing the two together, while Ted lays it down on Justin during a round of golf, leading Justin to believe that Ted isn't the honest, wholesome guy everyone might think he is. Lexi reveals to Sutton that she knew that she wasn't Emma all along and urges her to make up with Emma when she returns to Phoenix, which Sutton is reluctant to do. The letter of secrets that Sutton sent the Mercers during her time in jail arrives in the mail and Emma is able to intercept it before Kristen opens it, saying that she wrote it out of anger, but she doesn't mean it now. She tears it up in front of Kristen, but later tapes it back together and reads it to Ethan. Emma starts thinking about how she'll say goodbye to everyone she'll have to leave, but Ethan promises her that he'll follow her to wherever she'll have to go.
10	10	"East of Emma"	Ron Lagomarsino	Charles Pratt, Jr.	October 17, 2011	1.28
It's Emma and Sutton's 17th birthday and the Mercers promise Sutton a day full of festivities. Emma is aware that her time in Phoenix is coming to an end and she wants to come clean to the Mercers about her true identity before she leaves. She starts giving heartfelt goodbyes to Kristin, Ted, and Laurel, who have grown to be like family to her even though she hasn't been honest with them. Sutton arrives in Phoenix just in time for her birthday and her first order of business is to reel Emma in using Ethan as bait. Ethan declares his love for Emma to Sutton, who assumes her sister's identity at the computer. After speaking with Alec, Derek shows up at Char's house to win her back, but before she can respond, the police show up to take Derek into custody after receiving an anonymous tip about him. Char stands up to her mother at the police station when she wants to stay and vouch for Derek, but Alec insists that the two return home. Laurel wants Justin to be her date to Sutton's birthday party, but he is reluctant to face Ted after their last encounter. Emma returns to Sutton's room and finds an alert from Ethan telling her to meet him at the cabin, which was actually written by Sutton as a ploy. Sutton shows up to meet Ethan at the cabin and he assumes that she is Emma. The real Emma walks in just as Sutton and Ethan are making out. The twins have a bitter confrontation as Sutton accuses Emma of stealing her life (although it was Sutton who told Emma to take over her identity in the first place) and Emma defends herself, saying that all she really wanted in Phoenix was to build a relationship with her biological sister. Sutton then storms out and heads to her party to reveal Emma's lies. Emma and Ethan have a fall-out as Emma desperately wants to leave Phoenix before anything else happens and Ethan pushes her to fight for herself and not succumb to what Sutton wants. Emma calls Lexi to tell her how everything turned out and after their conversation, Emma decides to show up at Sutton's party after all. Emma and Ethan declare their love to each other and they wonder why Sutton had yet to arrive since she left the cabin long before they did. It turns out that while Sutton was driving to the party, a mysterious figure popped up from her back seat and shocked Sutton to the point that she had lost control of her vehicle and had driven into a lake. When it is time for Sutton's birthday speech, Emma is fully prepared to reveal herself to Sutton's family and friends, but as she is about to reveal her secret, she notices a strange figure behind one of the outdoor curtains and ends her speech before revealing anything. She heads out to find the mysterious person and Kristin follows her, identifying the person as "Annie." The last scene of the episode shows a panicked Sutton drowning with no one in sight.
11	11	"O Twin, Where Art Thou?"	Fred Gerber	Charles Pratt, Jr.	January 2, 2012	1.76
Back at Sutton's birthday party, Emma (as Sutton) and Kristin come across Char's aunt Annie, who now goes by Rebecca. It appears that Kristin, Ted, and Alec were all familiar with her during their high school days, the men especially. Phyllis is outraged that Char invited Rebecca back to town and ends up with a DUI after she angrily leaves the party drunk. After a talk with Alec, Rebecca asks him to submit a letter that would require Phyllis to spend some time in rehab, leaving Char in her care. Meanwhile, a spare car has gone missing from the Mercer family garage and Emma and Ethan suspect that Sutton had taken it, while Dan and Laurel suspect Emma (as Sutton) and Ethan. Laurel loses the vintage bracelet that Justin had given her. Later, Dan finds the missing car in a lake after a nearby fisherman had spotted it. They open up the car and realize that Sutton wasn't in there, but she had left her purse and cell phone behind. Dan claims that Emma (as Sutton) had taken the car after all and when Emma fails to logically explain what had occurred the night before, Ethan steps in and takes the blame for her, telling Dan that he had taken the car to take Sutton out for a "birthday joyride." After Alec gets them out of custody, Dan confronts Ethan about constantly sticking up for Sutton and how she wouldn't do the same for him. Thayer suspects that Ethan had something to do with Sutton's absence and although Emma does not fully believe him, she begins to act cautious around Ethan. Ethan confronts Thayer about his accusations, but Alec breaks up the argument before they get anywhere. Ted is shown to have taken Laurel's bracelet while a very upset Laurel shows up at Justin's place and tells him that she lost it. Justin seems worried when she tells him that she told her family that it was his mother's when they were all looking for it and he tells her that his mother wore the bracelet when she died. Emma brings Ethan and Thayer together at the Mercer house to work out their trust issues, when Kristin brings Emma another birthday present. Thayer is suspicious of the wrapping and prompts Emma to open it. Inside the box was a piece of Sutton's birthday dress that she wore the night she disappeared with a threatening note that read, "Keep on being Sutton.....or you're next."
12	12	"When We Dead Awaken"	David Jackson	Mark Driscoll	January 9, 2012	1.50
Ethan and Thayer suspect Sutton of sending Emma the mysterious package and believe that she is playing another one of her "lying games" to spite Emma. Derek is back at school. While practicing tennis, she meets the tennis scout of Ted's alma mater and they see this as a way of getting Sutton to come forward when she hears that Emma is using her name for personal gain. Justin and Ted continue to be suspicious of one another. Rebecca tries to get custody of Char. Now living in fear of Sutton, Emma almost confesses her identity to Dan, but when Ethan and Emma pull up to his trailer and see his brother in a heated argument with Alec, she (Emma) backs out. Later, Ethan asks Dan about the encounter and he tells Ethan about how Alec bailed him out of a tough situation a long time ago. Meanwhile, Emma is off on the college visit with Ted and seems serious about the idea of going to college and playing tennis, something that seemed a bit out of Sutton's character. Justin breaks up with Laurel, leaving her confused as it came out of the blue. However, she feels that Ted is somehow involved. Emma and Ethan find out that Thayer is off following his own lead on Sutton. Ted and Alec are suspicious of Rebecca's motives. Laurel confronts Justin about what had happened between them, but Justin brushes her off, saying that there wasn't anything else he needed to talk about. Back in his room, an upset Justin kicks his "special box" and some of the contents spill out, including one of an autopsy report, presumably his mother's. Thayer shows up at Ethan's place and is convinced that Annie Hobbs has killed Sutton. They then head to the Mercer home to break the news to Sutton's family. As the three reflect on their good times with Sutton, Justin is shown burning his box. It also turns out that Sutton isn't dead after all.
13	13	"Pleased to Meet Me"	Joe Lazarov	R. Lee Fleming, Jr.	January 16, 2012	1.70
Sutton is back and says that someone had tried to kill her on the night of her birthday. Supposedly, Annie Hobbs had followed her that night and saved her from the lake after the suspect fled the scene, taking Sutton back to the motel that she had been staying at and caring for her. Emma believes that Sutton is telling some aspect of the truth, while Ethan and Thayer don't seem to be buying her act. Sutton takes them back to the motel, but Annie has taken off. Sutton is instructed to stay at Ethan's place during the day so that she doesn't run into anybody (since Emma is still pretending to be Sutton at this point because of Sutton's noticeable injury). Nonetheless, Sutton sneaks into the Mercer home to freshen up and play around in her room, but is caught by Kristin. Emma happens to come home and witnesses Sutton disrespecting Kristin, which leads to Emma confronting Sutton about the way she treats the people that care about her. To Emma's surprise, Sutton tells her that after she officially takes her life back, she actually wants Emma to stick around. Meanwhile, Ryan, a proclaimed bad boy who had been kicked out of boarding school returns to Arroyo and seeks Mads' attention, although she is convinced that he never changed. Kristin and Rebecca are planning an annual charity event. When Emma leaves Sutton alone to attend the event, someone breaks into the house, causing Sutton to flee, further puncturing her wound when she hits the window on her way out. She goes to the event to find Emma, Ethan, and Thayer, and as Thayer escorts her away from the party, Kristin finds her and sees her wound. Sutton and Emma later switch places (Emma now officially being herself and Sutton now taking her identity back), seeing as everyone already saw Sutton with a wound. Rebecca encourages Laurel to perform in front of an audience. After the festivities end, Laurel runs into Justin on her way out. He admits that he had been hiding something from her and reluctantly tells her his secret: He says that Ted is responsible for his mother's death, as she was one of his patients. His mother went in for a low-risk appendectomy, but Ted wasn't being careful and was distracted by some news that he had received that night, resulting in her unexpected death. Laurel breaks down after she realizes how much Justin has lied to her and warns him to stay away from her family. Since her charade is now over, Emma leaves during the night, not before seeing Sutton, Ted, and Kristin back together as one happy family.
14	14	"Black and White and Green All Over"	Fred Gerber	Stacy Rukeyser	January 23, 2012	1.66
Now stepping back into her old lifestyle, Sutton's personality shift is noticeable among her family members. Sutton doesn't want Emma staying with her, so she (Emma) moves into the Mercer family cabin. Thayer comes by to bring her the basics, plus some comfort food. Emma immediately knows the comfort food is not from Sutton but from Thayer, which he admits to. He asks Emma what she is doing with the laptop. Emma still thinks Thayer's dad had something to do with Sutton nearly drowning in her car on her birthday. Thayer says his dad is many things, but he is not a killer. Ethan wants Emma to run away with him, but she is reluctant to leave her sister behind unprotected. Justin approaches Laurel to apologize, but Laurel is still questioning everything about him. Later, Sutton spills Justin's secret to Ted without Laurel's consent and Ted goes to talk to him, leading to a confrontation that leaves Laurel upset at Justin, Ted, and Sutton. Ethan plans a public breakup with Sutton so that he could leave with Emma without suspicion. Mads encourages her father to take Rebecca as his date to the Black & White Ball and in turn, Rebecca tells her to take a chance with Ryan. Kristin reveals to Laurel that because of what happened with Justin's mother, Ted had lost his residency in L.A., which forced them to relocate to Phoenix. Sutton shows up at the cabin and tries to get Emma to stay, saying that she'll tell her parents about her. Emma isn't easily convinced by Sutton's sudden change of heart, but chooses to believe her, as she has always wanted to be a part of a family. At the ball, Justin shows up for Laurel, but Kristin tells him off. Sutton tries to get Ethan's affection in public and it seems like she might still have feelings for him. Ethan leaves early to be with Emma for the night, while Thayer asks Sutton for a dance. It is later revealed that the reason why Sutton hates Ryan is because they had a fling back in the ninth grade. Alec tells Ted that he'll date Rebecca to keep her from saying anything. Dan shows up to tell Alec that he had found Annie Hobbs lurking near the Mercer home; Sutton has been eavesdropping. Justin tells Laurel that he loves her. Sutton goes to get Emma and walks in on Emma and Ethan's make-out session. She tells them that they need to get to Annie before Alec does so that Emma could finally see her. When they finally meet Annie together, she tells them that she isn't their mother. Her own baby had died at birth and when she heard that a woman was giving up twins (Sutton and Emma) at the same hospital, she wanted one of them and ended up taking Emma. When the girls bring up Alec's name, Annie insists that they are in danger. Kristin thinks Ted is hiding things from her. In the last scene, Rebecca appears to be in the same hospital that Annie is currently being held in.
15	15	"Dead Man Talking"	Larry Shaw	Tamar Laddy	January 30, 2012	1.68
After what they had learned from Annie at the hospital, the group is on the lookout for the person who had tried to kill Sutton. At school, Sutton notices a snake tattoo on Derek's wrist and Ethan immediately questions him, although he doesn't say anything before a teacher breaks them up. Laurel tells the Mercers that she is now happily single, but in reality, she is back in a relationship with Justin. Mads tries to get Sutton to cover for her while she's on another date with Ryan during midterms week, against her father's wishes. It appears that Alec and Rebecca are now in a relationship. Sutton and Ethan wait to confront Derek after class, but learn that he had left school early, adding more suspicion. Sutton, Thayer, and Ethan drive over to Derek's house, only to find his mother, who tells them that Derek had gotten a ride from Dan on the night of the party, after his car supposedly broke down by the lake. Emma offers to temporarily trade places with Sutton, as she is the one that is capable of passing midterms and Sutton wants to find out more about Derek. Baz, a guitarist from the band Laurel had played with during the Black & White Ball, asks her to be a part of the band. Emma (as Sutton) raises suspicion in the Mercer household, as Ted and Kristin try to deal with Sutton's recent unruly behavior. Sutton and Thayer find out that Derek spends a lot of time at a body shop, so Sutton and Ethan go there to confront him. Taking a more aggressive approach than before, Ethan gets Derek to tell his story of what had happened on the night of Sutton's birthday: He was supposed to instruct Sutton to drive to a parking lot and the lake incident was an accident. Derek and Ethan then get in a physical fight, although both don't appear to have any huge injuries. When a car pulls up to the shop, Ethan and Sutton flee the scene. They are then pulled over by a cop, who is a friend of Dan's, for a broken taillight. The next day, Derek is found dead just outside the body shop, due to a serious injury to the head. Arriving at the scene, Dan senses a possible connection between his brother and the victim. While he does believe that Ethan is innocent, he tells him to leave town immediately to avoid any charges. Ethan, Thayer, and Sutton are all confused as to what had happened, and Ethan goes to get Emma so that they could run away together. At Arroyo, Ethan and Emma attempt to leave the building, but they run into the cops at the front door. As they're turning back to the other hallway, Emma trips and breaks a heel while Ethan hides in a closet. As the cops take Emma (as Sutton) for questioning, Ethan slips away. Ultimately, Emma and Thayer are left behind in Phoenix while Ethan and Sutton leave town. In the final moments, Rebecca is shown trying on engagement rings.
16	16	"Reservation for Two"	John Scott	Melissa Carter	February 6, 2012	1.41
Emma (as Sutton) is being interrogated by the police after Derek's murder, as Sutton is the only potential witness in the case. Since Emma wasn't actually at the scene, she stumbles on her words while trying to re-enact what had gone on between Ethan and Derek. Alec picks up on this and is suspicious of both Emma (as Sutton) and Dan, who he thinks is trying to hide Ethan (which isn't true). Sutton and Ethan arrive at the reservation that Ethan grew up in. She also meets his father, Ben, who is anything but friendly to the two of them. Sutton and Ethan also warm up to each other again during their time in hiding. Tribal police officers show up at Ben's ranch, looking for Ethan as he is wanted for murder. Ben doesn't rat him out and simply says that he hasn't heard from either of his sons since he kicked them out a while back. He then tells Ethan that he has a week to leave. Emma (as Sutton) is on bad terms with Mads and Ryan, as she is unable to keep up with Sutton's inconsistencies. Emma and Alec have a brief exchange at Derek's funeral regarding the night of the crime when they try to get a read on one another as they both think that the other was involved. Laurel performs with Baz's band for the first time. Ryan tells Mads that Sutton had hit on him at the Black & White Ball. Alec spends the night at Rebecca's. After tensions mount between Emma (as Sutton) and Mads because of what Sutton did, Emma reveals her true identity in order to salvage their friendship, leaving Mads shocked and confused.
17	17	"No Country for Young Love"	Michael Grossman	Justin W. Lo	February 13, 2012	1.25
Emma and Thayer update Mads on the twin situation. Alec demands that Dan find Ethan and bring him home as soon as possible, as he is Alec's "prime suspect." At the reservation, Sutton and Ethan notice Ben talking to a woman who is supposedly into him, although he never reciprocated those feelings. They invite her over for dinner and while Sutton tries to break the ice at the quiet table, Ben gets up and leaves, saying that he doesn't do small talk. Emma, Mads, and Thayer head off to find a college boy who was involved in drug-dealing with Derek, as they're desperate for any leads on who might've killed him to prove Ethan's innocence. Justin is a bit jealous of all of the time Laurel has been spending with Baz due to music commitments. Meanwhile, Rebecca knows of a music producer than could help Laurel's band produce a demo. While Ted is hesitant at first (presumably because of the tie with Rebecca), Kristin steps in and allows her to do it. Kristin is now more suspicious of her husband as she notices that Ted gets weary whenever Rebecca's name is mentioned. Alec is wondering why Rebecca wants to work close to the Mercers. Too many coincidences have led Emma and Thayer to believe that Alec was involved in the Derek's death, while Mads refuses to believe that her father would be a part of such a thing. Sutton tries to get Ethan to reconcile with his father and Ben ends up apologizing for being so harsh on Ethan all these years. After getting advice from Emma (as Sutton), Laurel decides to break up with Justin. Emma and Thayer interrogate two guys at a fraternity house, the frat leader and a pledge, who might know something and both were at the scene when the murderer killed Derek. The pledge then tells the trio that the murderer was none other than Alec (along with his unknown alibi), but he never told anyone because of Alec's ties to the fraternity. Ted confronts Rebecca about her hanging around his family after Emma and Mads go to ask her questions about Alec. Ted refuses to talk to Kristin about Rebecca and Kristin is tired of all of his lies. Sutton tells Ethan that she loves him and they kiss. The cops find Ethan and arrest him on the charges of murder.
18	18	"Not Guilty As Charged"	Bobby Roth	Mark Driscoll	February 20, 2012	1.32
Ethan is taken in at a county jail and Alec reveals that he has a star prosecutor working on Derek's side in the case, as he wants Ethan to be found guilty. Dan contacts his old girlfriend, an attorney, who might be able to help him. Sutton returns from the reservation and Thayer suspects that something had gone on between her and Ethan. Mads is angry at Sutton for hitting on Ryan and for not letting her in on all of the things that had been happening recently. She then tells Sutton that Emma is already a "friend for life," which is something that she couldn't say about Sutton at the moment, pushing Sutton to a breaking point when it comes to the comparisons between her and her sister. Laurel is the only Mercer that is supportive of Emma (as Sutton) during this time. Baz tells her that their band got a spot as an alternate at Coachella, but Laurel isn't sure if her parents would let her go. Theresa Lopez, Dan's ex, agrees to take Ethan's case. When she asks about any other possible persons of interest in the case, Emma and Thayer tell her about Alec Rybak, which upsets Mads. Emma (as Sutton) goes to Rebecca for help, but it is uncertain which side she's really on. Ted creates a lot of tension in the household with the three Mercer women. Rebecca starts to question Alec during their dinner date, while a note arrives at the table telling her to "not trust her date." Alec is quick to refute all of her questions. Sutton and Emma catch up at the cabin and when Emma goes inside for a moment, Theresa sends her a text saying that she could finally see Ethan in jail. Sutton sees the message and responds to it, making sure to delete it right afterwards to leave Emma clueless. Sutton later shows up at the jailhouse, posing as Emma. Not knowing that it wasn't really Emma, Ethan tells her that Sutton means nothing to him. A distraught Sutton (as Emma) then lies and tells him that she (Emma) slept with Thayer. Rebecca gets sent a picture of Alec preparing to hit Derek with a tire iron at the body shop. Ethan is dismissed from custody due to insufficient evidence. Emma is upset when Ethan doesn't come up to her after the hearing and that night, Sutton comes to her and claims that she and Ethan had slept together (which was also untrue).
19	19	"Weekend of Living Dangerously"	Joanna Kerns	R. Lee Fleming, Jr.	February 27, 2012	1.20
Emma and Mads go to confront Ethan about what had happened between him and Sutton at the reservation, but he refuses to speak to her. Dan tells Ethan that Emma (as Sutton) was the only one who stood by his side during the trial, but because of Sutton's lie, Ethan is still mad at Emma. Ted comes home to find Kristin looking through his old files on Justin's case. Emma then confronts Sutton and Sutton wants to pay Emma to leave town. At the end of their argument, Emma tells Sutton that she's going to reveal herself to the Mercers before she goes anywhere. Emma finds Kristin crying in the country club bathroom and tries to comfort her while Sutton looks on. She finds out that Kristin thinks that Ted and Rebecca had an affair. Kristin also wants Emma to accompany Laurel to the Coachella Festival. Meanwhile, Mads and Ryan haven't been spending any time together because of her recent involvement with the twins and what happened with Derek. She hints that she thinks her dad is involved and Ryan tells her that she should find out the truth sooner than later. Emma finally catches Ethan and they figure out the truth about Sutton's lies. The group decides to focus on Rebecca and her possible involvement with everything that has been going on. Dan is getting suspicious of Alec. Emma, Laurel, Ethan, and the band are stranded in Buford Falls when their van breaks down. Ted assures Kristin that the phone call he had received the night Justin's mother died was from a doctor and not from Rebecca. It is later revealed in a conversation with Alec that Ted was lying. Theresa and Dan reconnect and it turns out that they had broken up because of Alec. Sutton and Thayer are researching Rebecca and find out that she was once married to a very wealthy man. They call up his residence and his housekeeper picks up. She was close to Rebecca and tells them that Rebecca had longed to return to Phoenix after the divorce, since the "love of her life" had lived there. Although she never knew his name, the housekeeper also tells them that she kept a locket with his photo in it, which prompts the two to go looking for it. Emma (as Sutton) tells Laurel that she is a virgin and Laurel tries to get her and Ethan together. Right after Mads and Thayer find out that Alec had proposed to Rebecca, Sutton and Thayer find out that the photo in Rebecca's locket was of Ted. Ethan finally admits to Emma that he had kissed Sutton on the ranch and an upset Emma tells him that a part of him will always wish that he could be with Sutton.
20	20	"Unholy Matrimony"	Fred Gerber	Charles Pratt, Jr. & Stacy Rukeyser	March 5, 2012	1.24
Emma and Ethan have officially broken up. Thayer questions Rebecca and his father as to why they need to plan a wedding in just two days. Sutton finds out about the breakup and quickly hits on Ethan, although he assures her that his feelings for her are long gone. Kristin runs into Alec and Rebecca and learns about their wedding. She tells Rebecca that she and Ted had "talked" and that everything was okay, which Rebecca misinterpreted and thought that Ted had finally revealed their secret to her, leaving Kristin confused. Later, Emma shows Kristin the locket that Sutton and Thayer had found. Sutton and Thayer approach Dan and Theresa for help, but Dan tells them to drop the case. Kristin begins distancing herself from Ted since she is now certain that he had lied to her. Emma goes to Thayer for support and he begins to show feelings towards her. During Ted's toast at Alec & Rebecca's dinner, Kristin storms out of the room, with Rebecca close behind. Kristin finds out about the affair, with neither Rebecca nor Ted denying it. She leaves the dinner with Emma (as Sutton) and Laurel by her side. Ethan and Sutton break into Rebecca's house during the dinner, looking for clues. They stumble upon the photo of Alec at the crime scene on her computer. Ted and Alec have a fall-out, with Ted angrily telling Alec that he never had his back - Alec reminds him that Kristin doesn't know "half the secret." Ethan wants Emma back, but she says that they're over for good. Emma (as Sutton) reluctantly attends the wedding (without any of the Mercers) to witness a plan that Dan & Thayer had come up with. Laurel shuts the door on a guilty Ted when he decides to come home. Emma (as Sutton) confronts Rebecca right before the wedding, but she insists that Alec was with her the entire night of Derek's murder. Dan and his police crew do a thorough search of Alec's house while the Rybaks are gone and find the murder weapon, a bloody tire iron, in his golf club bag. Alec gets arrested right after he is officially married. Ethan decides to go to the wedding to find Emma, but instead, sees her hugging Thayer. Sutton is shown overlooking the entire event and Rebecca walks in, with Sutton addressing her as "Mom". It is later revealed that Sutton and Rebecca had known about each other for some time and had planned for the events to occur.
