= The Lying Game season 2 =

The Lying Game
- Season 2
- No. of episodes: 10

Release
- Original network: ABC Family
- Original release: January 8 – March 12, 2013

Season chronology
- ← Previous; Season 1

The second and final season of The Lying Game, based on the book series of the same name by Sara Shepard, premiered on January 8 and concluded on March 12, 2013 on ABC Family. As the twins' saga continues in season two, there are more surprises, secrets and lies. The girls' recently revealed birth mother Rebecca lures Sutton into her plans for the Mercer family. Emma grows closer to Thayer, while still being drawn to Ethan, who has started to reconnect with Sutton. Kristin feels betrayed after Ted came clean about his long ago affair with Rebecca, but Ted might be hiding even more shocking revelations. And Mads connects with a mysterious new guy in town who brings a whole new level of secrets with him.

== Cast and characters ==
=== Main cast ===
- Alexandra Chando as Emma Becker and Sutton Mercer
- Andy Buckley as Ted Mercer
- Allie Gonino as Laurel Mercer
- Alice Greczyn as Madeline "Mads" Rybak
- Blair Redford as Ethan Whitehorse
- Charisma Carpenter as Rebecca Sewell
- Helen Slater as Kristin Mercer

=== Recurring cast ===
- Adrian Pasdar as Alec Rybak
- Tyler Christopher as Dan Whitehorse
- Christian Alexander as Thayer Rybak
- Ryan Rottman as Jordan Lyle
- Yara Martinez as Theresa Lopez

=== Guest stars ===
- Adam Brooks as Baz
- Craig Nigh as Officer Harry

== Episodes ==
No. overall	No. in season	Title	Directed by	Written by	Original release date	U.S. viewers (millions)
21	1	"The Revengers"	Fred Gerber	Charles Pratt, Jr.	January 8, 2013	1.55
Alec is denied bail at his trial and he winks at Emma (as Sutton) afterwards, prompting her to think that he's holding a secret about her. Rebecca wants to get back together with Ted and tells Sutton to play nice with Emma to get her on their side. When Emma confronts Alec in jail, he reveals that he knows her real identity and her history, although he insists that he won't tell her anything until he's released from prison. He does, however, tell her not to trust Sutton, indicating that he might also know about Rebecca's plans. Thayer thinks that his father is just spreading paranoia. Alec also asks Theresa to represent him in court. After blatantly refusing at first, he manages to get her on his side after presenting her with unknown evidence. Sutton is still trying to reconnect with Ethan, who is still in the process of getting over Emma. Thayer's visit with Alec in jail brings back heated tension between the two and Mads heads into a downward spiral, meeting Jordan, a new guy in town, along the way. Thayer tells Emma that he has feelings for her and she says that she feels the same way. Rebecca suggests for Sutton to take the honest route with Ethan, leading her to tell him that she's still in love with him, but he sends her home. Emma and Laurel's plans to bring the Mercers back together only make things worse and Kristin is thinking about a divorce. In the last moments, Mads decides to move in with the Mercers to avoid her now broken life and Jordan shows up at Rebecca's door, calling her "Mom" to Sutton's surprise.
22	2	"Cheat, Play, Love"	David Jackson	Stacy Rukeyser	January 15, 2013	1.22
Sutton asks Emma for her blessing to date Ethan if the opportunity were to present itself. Emma hesitantly tells her that it's okay, as she has been getting closer to Thayer lately. Emma (as Sutton) suggests that Kristin and Ted go to marriage counseling. Jordan enrolls at Arroyo, which makes it awkward for Mads, who had a one night stand with him at the festival. He also meets Laurel and Rebecca suggests that he get to know her. She also throws him a welcome party to lure in Ted. Alec tells Theresa that Rebecca was most likely the one behind the murder and his acquittance. He wants Mads to visit him in jail and she refuses because of Thayer's warnings, but eventually agrees to go to get answers for Emma, as well as herself. Alec tells her that he did visit the body shop the night of Derek's death, but left before the murderer showed up. He also insists that he was protecting Sutton and Emma by keeping them a secret all this time and Mads believes his claim to innocence. At their counseling session, Kristin makes Ted promise that he has no more secrets and it is presumed that he lies, since he doesn't mention his child with Rebecca. Dan and Theresa go on a stakeout after finding mysterious fingerprints on Alec's golf bag. They question the woman, who had worked at the country club that Alec went to, and she states that a man had called her to get to her to place the tire iron into Alec's bag. Mads and Thayer turn against each other and during their argument, she reveals that Thayer is not Alec's biological son, which explains their constant tension. After getting Emma (as Sutton) in trouble for assisting him in cheating due to Sutton's antics, Ethan tries to reconcile with her to no avail. Emma and Thayer kiss and Ethan gets drunk at the party, getting dropped off at Sutton's door in the middle of the night. Jordan watches him from the car and sees Sutton, possibly putting two-and-two together.
23	3	"Advantage Sutton"	Joanna Kerns	Curtis Kheel	January 22, 2013	1.28
Ethan tells Sutton that he regrets spending the night with her. Rebecca then tells Sutton to take her life back from Emma. Due to missing too many school days and getting caught for plagiarizing, Ethan must pass an intensive test to stay in school. Emma offers to tutor him, but breaks plans with Thayer in the process, which leads to the two not talking. Thayer finds what he thinks is phone evidence of Alec being the murderer, but during his visit to the jail, he inadvertently gets Alec released. Rebecca is less than thrilled about the news, while the girls are still trying to get Kristin and Ted back together. Laurel gets Mads to tag along on her "date" with Jordan, but she ends up leaving early. Sutton and Emma play a game of tennis to determine who gets to be "Sutton Mercer" at the regional championships, with Sutton essentially intending to reclaim her identity for good. Emma forfeits when she hears that Thayer is going back to Los Angeles, due to the circumstances with Alec. Thayer asks Emma to leave with him, but she has grown too attached to the Mercers, so they part ways. Jordan shows up at Mads' window and although she's angry with him, they start making out just as Laurel walks in. Rebecca is revealed to have been behind the phone call to the woman at the country club.
24	4	"A Kiss Before Lying"	John Scott	R. Lee Fleming, Jr.	January 29, 2013	1.36
Sutton resumes her old lifestyle and immediately raises suspicion with Laurel. Ted announces that there will be a banquet held in his honor and wants Kristin to give an opening speech. Since she's reluctant to, Sutton offers to give it instead with a hidden agenda. Alec and Rebecca go on a honeymoon to the cabin, the same one in which Emma was staying in. As they pull up, Emma and Ethan grab their belongings and hide behind a backdoor, however, Rebecca catches a glimpse of them. Emma checks into the same motel that Sutton had stayed in the night of the lake incident and the desk clerk, thinking that she was Sutton, reminds her of the money that she owed him for having two women in a room with her last time, indicating that someone else was with Sutton and Annie that night. Later, Sutton shows up at the motel during Emma and Ethan's study session and Emma questions her, but she dismisses his claims. As Sutton is leaving in the parking lot, Carl comes up to her, thinking that she was the forgetful girl from earlier that day, and hands her a sketch of the second woman to spark her memory - the woman highly resembles Rebecca. At night, the lights out go while Rebecca is in the shower and she stumbles into Alec in the dark, who she claims to have knocked her out. Rebecca's paranoia about Alec seeking revenge sets in. After hearing Laurel talk about what she and Thayer had, Emma decides to go to L.A. for him. Rebecca wants Sutton to reveal that Ted is her biological father at the banquet, which would in turn reveal her true status. However, after Kristin tells her a heartfelt story about her first night home as a baby, Sutton finds herself unable to break up her family. This touches Ethan and he kisses her afterwards. When Emma arrives in L.A., she finds Thayer with another girl. Meanwhile, Mads and Alec move into Rebecca and Jordan's place. Later, Mads calls Emma while she's at the bus station to check up on her and when Laurel walks in, Mads tells her that she's on the phone with Sutton. Laurel says hello. A few moments later, Laurel does a double-take as the real Sutton enters the kitchen announcing that she's running late. Thayer finds Emma right before she leaves and they reunite. Rebecca is angry at Sutton for going back on their plan and is jealous of Sutton's natural bond with Kristin. In retaliation, Rebecca hands her a journal that was supposedly written by Kristin about wanting to give her away as a child.
25	5	"Much Ado About Everything"	Bobby Roth	Céline Geiger	February 5, 2013	1.25
Sutton reads Kristin's old diary in disbelief. Due to Mads' slip-up in the last episode, Laurel becomes extremely suspicious of Sutton, Mads, and Ethan - thinking that they're hiding a secret. Over in L.A., Emma and Thayer decide to find the doctor who delivered her at the hospital where she was born. They also think that Sutton has been hiding the truth. The doctor refuses to hand over confidential information. Dan proposes to Theresa. Jordan is still making moves on Mads, who tries not to get involved, but it is inevitable that they act on their feelings. At a family dinner, Sutton confronts Kristin about the things that she wrote in her diary in front of everyone, which included Kristin wanting to give Sutton back soon after the adoption and that she had developed feelings for Alec at one point. Kristin insists that her words were only due to being alone, depressed, and overwhelmed at the time. Ted leaves because of the Alec mention. Emma and Thayer find a woman who was at the hospital on the night the twins were born and she tells Emma that Rebecca is her birth mother. Emma is shocked and confused as to why her real mother has been shutting her out all this time. At Dan and Theresa's engagement party, Alec asks Dan to keep investigating the Derek Rogers case, as Alec is still looking for the real murderer. However, Dan has been officially released from the case. That night, Sutton and Ethan return to the Mercer home and talk about Emma, not knowing that Laurel was eavesdropping. Laurel follows Sutton out her bedroom window and finds herself spying on Sutton and Rebecca from atop a rock wall. Sutton and Rebecca are scheming about their plans to use Alec and Kristin's once-attraction to get Ted once and for all. Laurel falls off the wall and the two find her unconscious on the ground. She is taken to a hospital, where she tells Ted that she thinks "there are two of them." Ted doesn't know what she's talking about. Later, Emma and Thayer arrive at the hospital and the twins have a bitter exchange that ends in Sutton kicking Emma out of her life. In the final moments, Emma goes in and tells Laurel that she is Sutton's twin sister and she asks Laurel for help. Also, Jordan is holding a secret about his past that involves Rebecca.
26	6	"Catch Her in the Lie"	John Scott	Charles Pratt, Jr. & Ariana Jackson	February 12, 2013	1.22
Emma tries to explain everything to Laurel, who is upset that she wasn't let in on the secret sooner. She also seems to be breaking under the pressure of keeping it. Dan is investigating Jordan's history, while Theresa remains tight-lipped about what Alec told her during his time in jail, which was that there were twins. Alec and Theresa realize that the two girls are the key to solving Derek's murder and they are onto Rebecca's trail. Meanwhile, Rebecca and Jordan are plotting something of their own. Jordan "asks" Laurel to the Flipside Formal, which makes Mads jealous, since she and Jordan are in a complicated relationship. Laurel vents to Ethan about them having to keep the twin secret and she tries to resurface his feelings for Emma. Kristin finds out that Ted took $20,000 out of their bank account for extra expenses, arising suspicion of another affair. Laurel goes to Emma with this information and agrees to help discover the truth once and for all. Ethan also decides to join in on their plan to expose Sutton and Rebecca at the formal. Derek's mother comes to Dan when she finds a bag containing $20,000 worth of cash and Ethan overhears Dan and Theresa's conversation about this. Thayer and Ethan kidnap Sutton and throw her into a limo. Thayer drives her away so that Emma could take her place at the dance, but when they pull over, Sutton jumps into the front seat and leaves him in the middle of nowhere. She then texts Rebecca to tell her about Emma's secret switch, ruining Emma's plan. Mads is hurt that no one let her in on anything. When Sutton meets with Rebecca, she wants to bring Emma into the know, but Rebecca refuses. Kristin and Alec spend the night reminiscing and they almost kiss. Ted and Rebecca get to talking about old times and they share a dance. Emma pieces everything together and is almost certain that Ted is her real father. She thinks that Ted had been blackmailed by Derek to give him the money in order to keep the twin secret from his wife and that Ted was the real murderer. Ethan and Mads end up talking the night away with one another after Sutton breaks up with him. It is presumed that Emma and Thayer end up sleeping together.
27	7	"Regrets Only"	Robert J. Metoyer	Stacy Rukeyser & Michael Notarile	February 19, 2013	1.30
Jordan tells Mads that Rebecca had made him take Laurel to the dance and he also agrees to go play golf with Alec, which irks Rebecca. Sutton begins second-guessing Rebecca. Emma talks to Alec about her revelations. He confirms that Ted is her biological father, but doubts that he is a killer. He also tells her to not tell Kristin a thing and that Ted is unaware of her existence. Alec and Kristin also make out, with Rebecca witnessing from afar. Derek's mother tells Theresa that someone has been leaving flowers routinely on Derek's grave. Theresa asks Dan to accompany her on a stakeout at the cemetery to hopefully catch a guilty murderer. Ethan tells Emma that he's tired of being pushed away. This conversation leaves Emma in tears as she starts regretting sleeping with Thayer. Alec confronts Jordan about his allegiance with Rebecca. Rebecca tells Ted that Kristin kissed Alec, as she's still trying to drive him away from his wife. Sutton accuses Rebecca of having to do with Derek's death. Rebecca tells her that Alec was the one that split her and Emma up, which was why Rebecca had a hand in framing Alec, but insists that she didn't kill Derek. Ted confronts Alec about the kiss and Alec reminds him of the huge favor that he did for him seventeen years ago - Rebecca told Alec about her pregnancy and told him to hide it from Ted, but Alec told Ted anyway so that he could adopt his biological daughter, Sutton. An emotional Ted wants to come clean. Kristin and Emma (as Sutton) have a heart-to-heart and Kristin tells her to stop worrying about what others think, as Emma is conflicted between stability and risk. Kristin gives Ted the divorce papers. Thayer and Ethan get into a physical fight over Emma. Mads confronts Jordan again and he says that Rebecca has been blackmailing him, but can't disclose what she had made him do. After hearing Ethan's speech about holding onto love, Laurel lets him know that Emma isn't over him quite yet. Ted kisses Rebecca and wants to reunite, although she is reluctant because she wants them to get back together for the right reasons. Ethan confesses his feelings for Emma and tells her that he knows that she feels the same although she's in denial. Dan makes Theresa promise that she'll put the case on hold until after their wedding, but she becomes obsessed with finding the killer. She heads back to the cemetery alone that night and shockingly runs into a familiar face. Meanwhile, Sutton had called her with information on Alec and Rebecca.
28	8	"Bride and Go Seek"	Norman Buckley	Curtis Kheel	February 26, 2013	1.23
Theresa doesn't show up for her wedding. Dan suspects that something had gone terribly wrong, since he doesn't believe that she would ever just walk away. Mads is weary of Jordan's intentions because of his tie to Rebecca. Alec and Rebecca are suspecting one another of having to do with Theresa's disappearance. Dan and Ethan head over to Theresa's house, only to find that all of her clothes are missing and that her engagement ring was left on a counter. Dan believes that he has been set up and someone had done something to his fiance because she knew too much about the Derek Rogers case. They head to the cemetery and Dan finds what appear to be Theresa's tracks, as well as a man's. Alec arrives and the two get into a dispute. Sutton is also worried about Theresa, as they never had their planned meeting the night before. She interrogates Rebecca, who continues to deny every accusation. Sutton isn't buying any of it as her suspicions about Rebecca are now clear. Dan asks Ethan if he knew about the secret that Alec had told Theresa and although he does know, he can't tell him. Ethan goes to Emma for permission to tell Dan everything, but she and Thayer shut him out. Meanwhile, Emma wants to confront Ted about her history and whether or not he was really involved with Derek, since she's trying to prove his innonence for her own sanity. Sutton goes to Emma and tells her the truth about her relationship with Rebecca - how they had met on the night of the lake incident and how the two of them have been leaving Emma out as Rebecca has been pursuing Ted. Reasonably, Emma doesn't believe her and hides what she knows about Ted from Sutton, who is now confused that Emma's keeping something. Jordan goes to Alec and tells him that he's willing to ditch Rebecca and switch sides for an honest relationship with Mads. It is revealed that Jordan was the one who made the call to frame Alec with the tire iron under Rebecca's commands. Kristin is seeing Alec, which is getting to Ted. Ethan figures out that Emma thinks Ted is a suspect. Mads overhears a conversation between Jordan and Rebecca, in which Rebecca tells him to spy on Mads and her friends to get updated information on Theresa. Jordan, however, tells Mads about the conversation and tells her that he knows about Emma. Alec tells Thayer that he loves him. The police find Theresa's car, which contained nothing but her written wedding vows. Dan vows to kill the person who took Theresa from him. In the middle of the night, Ted appears at the cemetery, looking for something that he had dropped. Emma is already there, in complete shock that her suspicions about her father being a murderer has seemingly been proven true.
29	9	"The Grave Truth"	Joe Lazarov	R. Lee Fleming, Jr.	March 5, 2013	1.22
Emma (as Sutton) confronts Ted and he comes clean about everything. He was the one who left Derek flowers, even though he insists he wasn't the killer, because he felt that Derek was too young to die despite the fact that Derek had been blackmailing him. Ted confirms that he's her birth father and that Rebecca is her birth mother. He also reveals that he was the one that Theresa ran into the other night, but was uninvolved in her disappearance as they had parted ways beforehand. Mads talks to her father about her feelings on Jordan and Rebecca. Just as he promised Emma (as Sutton), Ted goes to Dan the following morning to tell him about his encounter with Theresa before she disappeared. Dan doesn't buy Ted's account and starts getting aggressive before Alec walks in to defend Ted. He also tells Dan that he thinks Rebecca is behind both Derek's death and Theresa's disappearance. Jordan sees Rebecca locking a mysterious box into a drawer. Rebecca calls Kristin out in public for kissing her husband. Ethan gets into trouble with Dan when Dan finds out that Ethan had suspected Ted sooner and didn't tell him. Dan kicks Ethan out of the trailer. Kristin offers him a spot on their couch, making it awkward for Emma and Thayer. Ted becomes more cautious around Rebecca. Ethan tells Emma that he doesn't regret not telling Dan because he wanted to help her. They almost kiss. Emma and Sutton touch bases on Rebecca's situation, as Sutton had gotten nowhere after accusing her of everything. Kristin talks to Thayer about maybe not getting too serious about his relationship with Emma (as Sutton), since they're both still young. The group, consisting of the twins, Laurel, Ethan, Mads, and the newly recruited Jordan, seeks to bring Rebecca down. Emma reveals herself to Ted, as the twins want him to help them get the truth out of Rebecca, since Jordan and Sutton have been burning bridges with her lately. Ted then confronts Alec about splitting his girls up. When Rebecca is away, Jordan goes into her room to get her box, but a masked intruder has gotten it first and Jordan chases the person out of the house, causing Mads to be knocked over in the process. Laurel and Sutton are having a heartfelt conversation at the cabin when Sutton suddenly gets a call from Theresa's phone. The only thing she hears is someone heavily breathing. The two head to the police station, where Ethan and Dan are. They trace the phone back to the country club, where Emma and Thayer had been talking. Police cars arrive to block of the entire area as the phone is recovered around the back. The twins cannot be seen together, but they realize that someone has to be there to offer Ethan moral support during this time and Sutton accepts that Emma and Ethan are meant to be together, so Emma assumes Sutton's identity as she heads back out to the hectic scene. One of the officers turns the pool light on and they discover Theresa's lifeless body in the water.
30	10	"To Lie For"	Fred Gerber	Charles Pratt, Jr. & Stacy Rukeyser	March 12, 2013	1.11
Dan goes crazy after Theresa is officially found dead. Alec finally tells him about the twins. Thayer, who has been jealous of Ethan lately, gives Emma an ultimatum on their relationship. Meanwhile, Ethan finds himself in a tough predicament with Dan, who tells Ethan that it's either going to be his family or the twins. That same night, Emma tells Ethan that she chooses to be with him, but he tells her that their relationship has been the source of everything bad that has happened and leaves. Emma tells Laurel about her fears for the future when all of the lies are eventually brought to the surface. She also worries about what Kristin will think. Theresa's autopsy report comes back and states that she had died due to a blow to the head (probably from a metal object), a few days prior to the discovery of her body, covered in bits of limestone. Sutton begs Ted to not tell Kristin anything just yet. Emma and Rebecca finally confront one another, with Emma completely rejecting Rebecca as her mother. Dan finds the site where Theresa was most likely killed. Sutton warns Emma to not fall under Rebecca's spell and the twins share a bonding moment. The girls, along with Laurel, see a news broadcast of Dan and Ethan at the murder scene and Sutton notices Dan holding a bag that was found. Emma tells her to go to Ethan and try to find out what it was to see if they could connect it to Rebecca. Emma talks to Laurel about her fall-outs with both Ethan and Thayer. Thayer is shown collapsing in anger from a run. Kristin and Ted are settling their divorce, which doesn't end well because Ted won't come clean due to his promise to Sutton. Ethan reluctantly tells Sutton that they found half of a heart necklace at the crime scene and Sutton brings out the other half, which Rebecca had given her. Dan takes the evidence to Alec and he issues a warrant for Rebecca's arrest. When everyone leaves the office, Alec makes a call to a mystery person, telling them to pack their bags fast. When Dan and his police crew show up at Rebecca's home, they find that she had already left. Later, Rebecca sends a videochat to the twins, asking them to believe that she is innocent for both murders. She also refuses to let them know her location, since she claims that she doesn't want to put them in danger. She does, however, contact Jordan and tells him that she wants him to leave town with her. Jordan doesn't want anything to do with her, but she blackmails him, saying that she'll go to the police about what he did to his brother back home. Emma (as Sutton) lets Kristin know that she loves her. Ted tells the twins that he has to tell Kristin and wants to introduce Emma to her. Emma tells Sutton that she'll leave the family alone until Kristin is ever ready to meet her and makes Sutton attend Theresa's memorial gala instead of her. At Theresa's memorial, Dan thanks Sutton for helping him. Alec tells Mads that he's glad Rebecca is away from their family. Emma goes to Thayer for a little talk. Rebecca sends Alec a note telling him to meet her on the roof of the country club, where the memorial is being held. She tells him that she knows that the both of them know who the real killer is. Fed up with running away from his past, Jordan turns himself into the police against Mads' pleas, in which the police tell her that Jordan is being arrested for his brother's murder. Rebecca accuses Alec of chasing her out of town so that she would be forever framed as a fugitive, while the person that Alec is protecting will live freely. Ted is about to finally tell Kristin about the twins, when Alec suddenly falls from the ceiling. Emma tells Thayer that she wants them to remain friends and an emotionally unstable Thayer orders her to leave. After she quickly runs off, Thayer lifts his couch cushion to reveal a large, sharp weapon, with rust resembling the ones at Theresa's suspected murder site. He then proceeds to smash various objects around his room, including a framed photograph of Emma.
