= Backgammon (disambiguation) =

Backgammon is one of the oldest board games.

Backgammon may also refer to:

- Backgammon (1979 video game), an Atari 2600 video game
- Backgammon (1988 video game), an Atari ST video game
- Backgammon (film), a 2015 erotic mystery by Francisco Orvañanos
- Backgammon (album), a 1976 jazz album by Art Blakey
- Backgammon (book), by Paul Magriel, classic 1976 book on how to play
