= List of The Lying Game episodes =

The Lying Game is an American television drama series, that aired on ABC Family, from August 15, 2011 to March 12, 2013 for a total of two seasons and 30 episodes. The series follows Emma Becker (Alexandra Chando), a foster kid that can't catch a break who finds out she has an identical twin sister named Sutton Mercer, who has the life Emma always wanted. The network green-lighted the series on February 22, 2011. On July 15, 2013, ABC Family officially cancelled the series.

== Series overview ==
Season	Episodes	Originally released	
Season	Episodes	First released	Last released
1	20	August 15, 2011	March 5, 2012
2	10	January 8, 2013	March 12, 2013

== Episodes ==
=== Season 1 (2011–12) ===
No. overall	No. in season	Title	Directed by	Written by	Original release date	U.S. viewers (millions)
1	1	"Pilot"	Mark Piznarski	Teleplay by : Charles Pratt, Jr.	August 15, 2011	1.39
2	2	"Being Sutton"	Wendey Stanzler	Charles Pratt, Jr.	August 22, 2011	1.47
3	3	"Double Dibs"	Michael Grossman	Stacy Rukeyser	August 29, 2011	1.31
4	4	"Twinsense and Sensibility"	David Jackson	Mark Driscoll	September 5, 2011	1.46
5	5	"Over Exposed"	Elodie Keene	Tamar Laddy	September 12, 2011	1.30
6	6	"Bad Boys Break Hearts"	Fred Gerber	R. Lee Fleming, Jr.	September 19, 2011	1.19
7	7	"Escape from Sutton Island"	John Scott	Stacy Rukeyser	September 26, 2011	1.06
8	8	"Never Have I Ever"	Norman Buckley	Mark Driscoll	October 3, 2011	1.23
9	9	"Sex, Lies and Hard Knocks High"	Joe Lazarov	R. Lee Fleming, Jr.	October 10, 2011	1.10
10	10	"East of Emma"	Ron Lagomarsino	Charles Pratt, Jr.	October 17, 2011	1.28
11	11	"O Twin, Where Art Thou?"	Fred Gerber	Charles Pratt, Jr.	January 2, 2012	1.76
12	12	"When We Dead Awaken"	David Jackson	Mark Driscoll	January 9, 2012	1.50
13	13	"Pleased to Meet Me"	Joe Lazarov	R. Lee Fleming, Jr.	January 16, 2012	1.70
14	14	"Black and White and Green All Over"	Fred Gerber	Stacy Rukeyser	January 23, 2012	1.66
15	15	"Dead Man Talking"	Larry Shaw	Tamar Laddy	January 30, 2012	1.68
16	16	"Reservation for Two"	John Scott	Melissa Carter	February 6, 2012	1.41
17	17	"No Country for Young Love"	Michael Grossman	Justin W. Lo	February 13, 2012	1.25
18	18	"Not Guilty As Charged"	Bobby Roth	Mark Driscoll	February 20, 2012	1.32
19	19	"Weekend of Living Dangerously"	Joanna Kerns	R. Lee Fleming, Jr.	February 27, 2012	1.20
20	20	"Unholy Matrimony"	Fred Gerber	Charles Pratt, Jr. & Stacy Rukeyser	March 5, 2012	1.24

=== Season 2 (2013) ===
No. overall	No. in season	Title	Directed by	Written by	Original release date	U.S. viewers (millions)
21	1	"The Revengers"	Fred Gerber	Charles Pratt, Jr.	January 8, 2013	1.55
22	2	"Cheat, Play, Love"	David Jackson	Stacy Rukeyser	January 15, 2013	1.22
23	3	"Advantage Sutton"	Joanna Kerns	Curtis Kheel	January 22, 2013	1.28
24	4	"A Kiss Before Lying"	John Scott	R. Lee Fleming, Jr.	January 29, 2013	1.36
25	5	"Much Ado About Everything"	Bobby Roth	Céline Geiger	February 5, 2013	1.25
26	6	"Catch Her in the Lie"	John Scott	Charles Pratt, Jr. & Ariana Jackson	February 12, 2013	1.22
27	7	"Regrets Only"	Robert J. Metoyer	Stacy Rukeyser & Michael Notarile	February 19, 2013	1.30
28	8	"Bride and Go Seek"	Norman Buckley	Curtis Kheel	February 26, 2013	1.23
29	9	"The Grave Truth"	Joe Lazarov	R. Lee Fleming, Jr.	March 5, 2013	1.22
30	10	"To Lie For"	Fred Gerber	Charles Pratt, Jr. & Stacy Rukeyser	March 12, 2013	1.11

== Ratings ==
The Lying Game : U.S. viewers per episode (millions)

Season	Episode number																			
Season	1	2	3	4	5	6	7	8	9	10	11	12	13	14	15	16	17	18	19	20
1	1.39	1.47	1.31	1.46	1.30	1.19	1.06	1.23	1.10	1.28	1.76	1.50	1.70	1.66	1.68	1.41	1.25	1.32	1.20	1.24
2	1.55	1.22	1.28	1.36	1.25	1.22	1.30	1.23	1.22	1.11	–									

Audience measurement performed by Nielsen Media Research
