= Revenger =

Revenger may refer to:

== Books and comics ==
- Revenger (novel), a 2016 science fiction novel by British author Alastair Reynolds.
- The Revengers (novel), a 1982 spy novel by Donald Hamilton
- The Revengers, a 1992 novel by Laurence James
- Revengers, a fictional group of supervillains in Marvel's comic universe.

== Film and television ==
- Revenger (film), 2018 South Korean action film
- Revenger (TV series), a 2023 anime series
- The Revengers (film), a 1972 Western film

=== Television episodes ===
- "Da Revengers", Wansapanataym season 3, episode 93 (2012)
- "The Revenger", Have Gun – Will Travel season 5, episode 3 (1961)
- "The Revengers", Gossip Girl season 6, episode 9 (2012)
- "The Revengers", The Lying Game, season 2, episode 1 (2013)
- "The Revengers", Wellington Paranormal series 3, episode 5 (2021)
