= Michael Grossman =

American film and television director

- Born: Michael N. Grossman
- Occupation: Film/television director
- Years active: 1987–present

Michael N. Grossman is an American film and television director.

He has directed a number of episodes from dozens of different television series, including Grey's Anatomy and the backdoor pilot ("The Other Side of This Life") of its spin-off, Private Practice. His other directorial work includes the series Charmed, Zoey 101, Angel, The Invisible Man, Arli$$, Firefly, Star Trek: Enterprise, Earth 2, Buffy the Vampire Slayer, Gilmore Girls, Drop Dead Diva, Manhattan, AZ, One Tree Hill, Las Vegas, Eureka, Dirty Sexy Money, Nashville and Pretty Little Liars.

Prior to working in television, Grossman was an assistant director on the films Hide and Go Shriek (1988) and Teenage Mutant Ninja Turtles (1990).

Grossman directed the television films Two Heads Are Better Than None (2000), Merry Christmas, Drake & Josh (2008), Starstruck (2010), and One Crazy Cruise (2015).

== Filmography ==
=== Film ===
==== Director ====
| Year | Title | Notes |
|---|---|---|
| 1999 | Road Block | TV Movie |
| 2000 | Kenan & Kel: Two Heads are Better Than None | TV Movie |
| 2008 | Merry Christmas, Drake & Josh | TV Movie |
| 2010 | Starstuck | TV Movie |
| 2011 | Fixing Pete | TV Movie |
| 2015 | One Crazy Cruise | TV Movie |
| 2020 | The Christmas House | TV Movie |
| 2021 | After the Fall | Short Film |
| 2022 | Safe | Short Film |
| 2023 | Room for None | Short Film |

=== Television ===
==== Director ====
| Year | Title | Season | Episode Title | Episode Number | Notes |
|---|---|---|---|---|---|
| 1995 | Earth 2 | 1 | "Natural Born Grendlers" | 6 | |
| 1995 | Earth 2 | 1 | "After the Thaw" | 18 | |
| 1998 | Arli$$ | 3 | "Whatever it Takes" | 1 | |
| 1998 | Arli$$ | 3 | "The American Game" | 11 | |
| 1999 | Arli$$ | 4 | "People Are Assets Too" | 3 | |
| 1999 | Arli$$ | 4 | "To Thine Own Self Be True" | 8 | |
| 1999 | Arli$$ | 4 | "Rules of the Game" | 12 | |
| 1999 | Cousin Skeeter | 2 | "Unchained" | 10 | |
| 2000 | The Pit | 1 | "Pilot" | 1 | |
| 2000 | Manhattan, AZ | 1 | | 10 | |
| 2000 | Manhattan, AZ | 1 | "Atticus Doesn't Live Here Anymore" | 12 | |
| 2000 | Manhattan, AZ | 1 | "The Voyage Home" | 13 | |
| 2000 | Arli$$ | 5 | "Making Things Happen" | 1 | |
| 2000 | Arli$$ | 5 | "Where There's a Will..." | 12 | |
| 2001 | Arli$$ | 6 | "As Others See Us" | 8 | |
| 2001 | Arli$$ | 6 | "Giving Something Back" | 9 | |
| 2001 | Angel | 2 | "Redefinition" | 11 | |
| 2001 | The Invisible Man | 1 | "Perchance to Dream" | 17 | |
| 2001 | The Invisible Man | 1 | "Diseased" | 19 | |
| 2001 | The Invisible Man | 2 | "Legends" | 1 | |
| 2001 | The Invisible Man | 2 | "The Importance of Being Eberts" | 3 | |
| 2001 | The Invisible Man | 2 | "Insensate" | 7 | |
| 2001 | The Invisible Man | 2 | "The Choice" | 12 | |
| 2001 | The Invisible Man | 2 | "Immaterial Girl" | 13 | |
| 2001 | The Invisible Man | 2 | "Father Figure" | 14 | |
| 2002 | The Invisible Man | 2 | "Mere Mortals" | 19 | |
| 2002 | The Invisible Man | 2 | "Possessed" | 20 | |
| 2002 | The Invisible Man | 2 | "The New Stuff" | 22 | |
| 2002 | The Chronicle | 1 | "Pig Boy's Big Adventure" | 12 | |
| 2002 | Arli$$ | 7 | "The Immortal" | 1 | |
| 2002 | Arli$$ | 7 | "In With the New" | 3 | |
| 2002 | Arli$$ | 7 | "It's All in the Game" | 7 | |
| 2002 | Firefly | 1 | "Safe" | 7 | |
| 2002 | Angel | 3 | "Birthday" | 11 | |
| 2002 | Angel | 4 | "Ground State" | 2 | |
| 2003 | Angel | 4 | "Players" | 16 | |
| 2003 | Buffy the Vampire Slayer | 7 | "Showtime" | 11 | |
| 2003 | Tremors | 1 | "A Little Paranoia Among Friends" | 7 | |
| 2003 | One Tree Hill | 1 | "Are You True?" | 3 | |
| 2003 | Jake 2.0 | 1 | "Middle Man" | 8 | |
| 2003 | Miracles | 1 | "Battle at Snow Ridge" | 8 | |
| 2004 | Charmed | 7 | "Charmed Noir" | 8 | |
| 2004 | Gilmore Girls | 4 | "In the Clamor and the Clanger" | 11 | |
| 2004 | Las Vegas | 1 | "The Strange Life of Bob" | 20 | |
| 2004 | Star Trek: Enterprise | 3 | "Hatchery" | 17 | |
| 2005 | Star Trek: Enterprise | 4 | "The Forge" | 7 | |
| 2005 | Star Trek: Enterprise | 4 | "Afflicition" | 15 | |
| 2005 | Killer Instinct | 1 | "Forget Me Not" | 8 | |
| 2005 | Charmed | 7 | "The Seven Year Witch" | 16 | |
| 2005 | Charmed | 7 | "Freaky Phoebe" | 19 | |
| 2005 | Charmed | 8 | "Kill Billie: Vol 1" | 6 | |
| 2006 | Charmed | 8 | "Generation Hex" | 17 | |
| 2006 | Zoey 101 | 2 | "Quinn's Alpaca" | 12 | |
| 2006 | Zoey 101 | 3 | "Hot Dean" | 3 | |
| 2006 | Zoey 101 | 3 | "Zoey's Tutor" | 4 | |
| 2006 | Zoey 101 | 3 | "The Silver Hammer Society" | 6 | |
| 2006 | Eureka | 1 | "Invincible" | 5 | |
| 2007 | Eureka | 2 | "All that Glitters" | 12 | |
| 2007 | The Dresden Files | 1 | "Rules of Engagement" | 4 | |
| 2007 | The Dresden Files | 1 | "Things that Go Bump" | 11 | |
| 2007 | Standoff | 1 | "Lie to Me" | 15 | |
| 2007 | Dirty Sexy Money | 1 | "The Lions" | 2 | |
| 2007 | Dirty Sexy Money | 1 | "The Italian Banker" | 3 | |
| 2007 | Grey's Anatomy | 3 | "Great Expectations" | 13 | |
| 2007 | Grey's Anatomy | 3 | "The Other Side of This Life: Part 1" | 22 | |
| 2007 | Grey's Anatomy | 3 | "The Other Side of This Life: Part 2" | 23 | |
| 2007 | Grey's Anatomy | 4 | "Crash Into Me: Part 1" | 9 | |
| 2007 | Zoey 101 | 3 | "Wrestling" | 8 | |
| 2007 | Zoey 101 | 3 | "Chase's Grandma" | 10 | |
| 2008 | Zoey 101 | 4 | "Rumor of Love" | 4 | |
| 2008 | Zoey 101 | 4 | "Walk-a-thon" | 7 | |
| 2008 | Big Shots | 1 | "Who's the Boss?" | 11 | |
| 2008 | Reaper | 1 | "Coming to Grips" | 15 | |
| 2008 | The Middleman | 1 | "The Obsolescent Cryogenic Meltdown" | 9 | |
| 2008 | Eli Stone | 2 | "Help!" | 7 | |
| 2008 | Dirty Sexy Money | 2 | "The Organ Donor" | 9 | |
| 2009 | Dirty Sexy Money | 2 | "The Facts" | 10 | |
| 2009 | 90210 | 1 | "By Accident" | 14 | |
| 2009 | Cupid | 1 | "The Great Right Hope" | 3 | |
| 2009 | Cupid | 1 | "Left of the Dial" | 6 | |
| 2010 | Huge | 1 | "Live Action Role Play" | 3 | |
| 2010 | Gigantic | 1 | "Bye Bye Baby" | 10 | |
| 2010 | Drop Dead Diva | 2 | "Queen of Mean" | 8 | |
| 2011 | Drop Dead Diva | 3 | "False Alarm" | 2 | |
| 2011 | Drop Dead Diva | 3 | "Closure" | 6 | |
| 2011 | Drop Dead Diva | 3 | "Bride-a-Palooza" | 12 | |
| 2011 | Greek | 4 | "Agents for Change" | 9 | |
| 2011 | Pretty Little Liars | 1 | "The New Normal" | 17 | |
| 2011 | Pretty Little Liars | 2 | "The Devil You Know" | 5 | |
| 2011 | The Lying Game | 1 | "Double Dibs" | 3 | |
| 2012 | The Lying Game | 1 | "No Country for Young Love" | 17 | |
| 2012 | Gossip Girl | 5 | "The End of the Affair?" | 11 | |
| 2012 | Pretty Little Liars | 2 | "A Hot Piece of A" | 15 | |
| 2012 | Drop Dead Diva | 4 | "Welcome Back" | 1 | |
| 2012 | Drop Dead Diva | 4 | "Crushed" | 7 | |
| 2012 | Drop Dead Diva | 4 | "Ashes to Ashes" | 9 | |
| 2012 | Drop Dead Diva | 4 | "Jane's Getting Married" | 13 | |
| 2012 | Jane by Design | 1 | "The Wedding Gown" | 8 | |
| 2012 | Body of Proof | 2 | "Identity" | 17 | |
| 2013 | Body of Proof | 3 | "Skin and Bones" | 7 | |
| 2013 | Body of Proof | 3 | "Doubting Tommy" | 8 | |
| 2013 | Nashville | 2 | "Don't Open that Door" | 5 | |
| 2013 | Pretty Little Liars | 3 | "Out of the Frying Pan, Into the Inferno" | 17 | |
| 2013 | Drop Dead Diva | 5 | "The Real Jane" | 2 | |
| 2013 | Drop Dead Diva | 5 | "Secret Lives" | 5 | |
| 2013 | Drop Dead Diva | 5 | "Fool for Love" | 6 | |
| 2013 | Drop Dead Diva | 5 | "50 Shades of Grayson" | 8 | |
| 2013 | Drop Dead Diva | 5 | "Trust Me" | 9 | |
| 2013 | Drop Dead Diva | 5 | "Guess Who's Coming" | 12 | |
| 2014 | Drop Dead Diva | 6 | "Soulmates?" | 2 | |
| 2014 | Drop Dead Diva | 6 | "Life & Death" | 4 | |
| 2014 | Drop Dead Diva | 6 | "Desperate Housewife" | 6 | |
| 2014 | Drop Dead Diva | 6 | "No Return" | 10 | |
| 2014 | The Fosters | 1 | "Kids in the Hall" | 17 | |
| 2014 | Mistresses | 2 | "Choices" | 11 | |
| 2014 | Mistresses | 2 | "Surprise" | 12 | |
| 2014 | Chasing Life | 1 | "Finding Chemo" | 14 | |
| 2014 | Switched at Birth | 3 | "Yuletide Fortune Tellers" | 22 | |
| 2014 | Pretty Little Liars | 4 | "Cover for Me" | 22 | |
| 2015 | Pretty Little Liars | 5 | "Over a Barrel" | 16 | |
| 2015 | Pretty Little Liars | 6 | "She's No Angel" | 5 | |
| 2015 | Chasing Life | 2 | 'Life of Breanna" | 3 | |
| 2015 | Switched at Birth | 4 | "The Accommodations of Desire" | 18 | |
| 2015 | The Originals | 3 | "I'll See You in Hell or New Orleans" | 3 | |
| 2016 | The Originals | 3 | "A Ghost Along the Mississippi" | 10 | |
| 2016 | Chicago P.D. | 3 | "The Song of Gregory William Yates" | 14 | |
| 2016 | DC's Legends of Tomorrow | 2 | "The Justice Society of America" | 2 | |
| 2017 | Andi Mack | 1 | "She's Turning Into You" | 9 | |
| 2017 | Daytime Divas | 1 | "Coma Bump" | 2 | |
| 2017 | Daytime Divas | 1 | "Baby Daddy Drama" | 5 | |
| 2017 | The Originals | 4 | "Voodoo Child" | 12 | |
| 2018 | The Originals | 5 | "Between the Devil and the Deep Blue Sea" | 4 | |
| 2018 | Life Sentence | 1 | "Love Factually" | 12 | |
| 2019 | Cobra Kai | 2 | "Fire and Ice" | 3 | |
| 2019 | Cobra Kai | 2 | "The Moment of Truth" | 4 | |
| 2019 | Games People Play | 1 | "The Wrath of Grapes" | 4 | |
| 2019 | Games People Play | 1 | "To Live and Lie in L.A." | 5 | |
| 2022 | Roswell, New Mexico | 4 | "Kiss From a Rose" | 6 | |
