= Universal Soldiers =

- Catalog No. 2065
- Directed by: Griff Furst
- Written by: Geoff Meed
- Produced by: David Michael Latt; David Rimawi; Paul Bales
- Starring: Kristen Quintrall; Dario Deak; Jason S. Gray; Rick Malambri
- Cinematography: Alexander Yellen
- Edited by: Griff Furst; David Michael Latt
- Music by: David Raiklen
- Distributed by: The Asylum
- Release date: August 7, 2007
- Running time: 90 minutes
- Country: United States
- Language: English
- Budget: 500.000 $

Universal Soldiers is a 2007 military science fiction film directed by Griff Furst, and starring Kristen Quintrall, Dario Deak, Jason S. Gray and Rick Malambri. It was distributed by The Asylum. It is a mockbuster of the Universal Soldier series, with elements of the Terminator franchise.

== Plot ==
The United States government initiates a program to create genetically modified cybernetic supersoldiers, conducted out of a laboratory on a remote island. However, after an earthquake, the test subjects escape from containment and begin killing the humans around them. A team of Marines is hunted by the supersoldiers as they struggle to survive and stop the rampage, while also overcoming their clashing personalities and strategies. Some members of the battalion seek to reach an armory so they can obtain better weaponry, while others instead advocate for locating the server bunker from which the supersoldiers can be shut down.

As the team progress, they learn more details about the enemy. The "Universal Soldiers" were genetically modified with various types of animal DNA, granting them a variety of superhuman attributes such as greatly enhanced speed and the ability to leap great distances. They were designed to have only rudimentary intelligence and follow orders from the server, but after escaping have begun to learn at an unexpected pace, displaying the capacity to communicate with each other, use weapons and carry out strategic tactics. They are limited by metal masks on the left side of their faces that connect them to the server, but if these masks were removed, the Universal Soldiers would be free to act under their own command.

The Universal Soldiers hunt the Marines across the island, picking them off one by one until only two, Kate Riley and Joe Ellison, remain. At the bunker, Kate manages to reboot the control system and shut down the Universal Soldiers just as one breaks in. With the mission over, Kate and Joe go out to await rescue and begin to express romantic interest in each other. However, Joe is suddenly impaled by a Universal Soldier that escaped being shut down via removing its mask. A grieving Kate beats the Universal Soldier to death and goes alone for extraction. As she cleans her face at a pond, the "Ultimate Universal Soldier" – a 25-foot-tall humanoid robot – is released. It pursues Kate, shrugging off the missiles fired by a pair of fighter jets that arrive to provide air support. Kate lures it to the island's power station, where she causes an energy discharge that electrocutes the robot, destroying it.

In the aftermath, Kate returns the dog tags of her fallen comrades to her superiors, who purge their records from the military's databases.

== Cast ==
- Kristen Quintrall as Pfc. Kate Riley
- Dario Deak as Joe Ellison
- Jason S. Gray as Lt. Clarke
- Rick Malambri as Lt. Ash
- Angela Vitale as Anne
- Kevin Kazakoff Dr. Frank DeMicco
- Noel Thurman as Dr. Woods
- Randy Mulkey as Maj. Clifton
- Cameron Gordon as Brian
- Justin Jones as Prof. Mueller
- Rob Filson as Universal Soldier
- Matthew Wise as Pfc. David Brian

== See also ==
- Universal Soldier - a 1992 science fiction film directed by Roland Emmerich
- R.O.T.O.R. - a 1989 low-budget science fiction film.
