= Teacher of the Year (2014 film) =

- Directed by: Jason Strouse
- Written by: Jason Strouse
- Starring: Matt Letscher; Keegan-Michael Key
- Cinematography: Matthew Skala
- Edited by: Matthew Skala
- Production company: Lower Merion Films
- Distributed by: Screen Media Films
- Release date: April 26, 2014 (Newport Beach Film Festival)
- Running time: 82 minutes
- Country: United States
- Language: English

Teacher of the Year is a 2014 independent comedy film directed by Jason Strouse and starring Matt Letscher and Keegan-Michael Key.

== Premise ==
Surrounded by the eccentric faculty of Truman High School, Mitch Carter wins the California Teacher of the Year award and immediately receives a tempting offer that may force him to leave his job.

== Cast ==
- Matt Letscher as Mitch Carter
- Keegan-Michael Key as Ronald Douche
- Sunny Mabrey as Kate Carter
- Larry Joe Campbell as Marv Collins
- Jamie Kaler as Steven Queeg
- Jason Sklar as Lowell Hammer
- Maile Flanagan as Hannah Manning
- Randy Sklar as Clive Hammer
- Tamlyn Tomita as Vivian Lew
- Brenda Strong as Ellen Behr
- Caitlin Carmichael as Sierra Carter
- Chris Conner as Brian Campbell
- Eden Riegel as Jackie Campbell
- Shari Belafonte as Robin Rivers
- Olivia Crocicchia as Faith Gregory
- Jonathan Goldstein as John Collier

== Production ==
The film is shot in a mock documentary format. In fact, one of the teachers makes a reference to This Is Spinal Tap, one of the most influential films in the mockumentary format.

Director and screenwriter Jason Strouse was a high school English teacher when he made the film.

== Reception ==
Critics lauded the film's deft combination of humor and drama. It has a 100% score on Rotten Tomatoes, based on seven reviews.
