= C. W. Blubberhouse =

Fictional poet and author

Chapman Winston Blubberhouse is a fictional poet and author, created by R. B. Russell and Mark Valentine in 1993. In 1993, Russell published a Brief Biography of Blubberhouse which was privately circulated, and thereafter letters started to appear under the name of C. W. Blubberhouse in the pages of The Independent, Daily Mail, The Stage, and Time Out, among other national UK newspapers and magazines. Blubberhouse was also listed in an Oxford college yearbook and appeared in a literary guide.

In 1994, The Sunday Times attacked the Times Literary Supplement for publishing a letter from Blubberhouse, and sent a reporter to the correspondent's address to investigate. They claimed Blubberhouse was "too good to be true", and declared him a hoax.

At the funeral of Oxford bookseller Rupert Cook in March, 1999, it was revealed that he had been partly responsible for the Blubberhouse letters. (It has subsequently been revealed that Roger Dobson was his co-conspirator.) Russell appeared on John Peel's Home Truths programme on Radio 4 in 2001 to tell the story. In a follow-up comment on Home Truths a correspondent used the adjective "Blubberhoused" to suggest that somebody had been hoaxed.
