= Eqah =

Bruneian singer

- Born: Nor Atiqah Abu Hassan; October 25, 1989 (age 36)
- Origin: Brunei
- Genres: Pop
- Occupation: Singer
- Instrument: Vocals
- Years active: since 2010
- Labels: Sensible Records

Eqah (born 25 October 1989), is a Bruneian singer who started out as a contestant on Passport to Fame (P2F), a television show in Brunei which has a similar concept to the Idol series.

== Passport to Fame ==
Eqah was one of the Top 18 finalists on the third season of Passport to Fame (P2F) (2010). By the fourth week of performances, she received a standing ovation from one of the judges and was given a perfect score of 27 for her performance of the song "Cik Cik Ke Boom". She was one of the most voted contestants in the beginning of the series but was eliminated in the eighth week.

=== P2F performances ===
Week # – Theme	Song Choice	Original Artist	Result
1 – Pop Songs	"Bersamamu"	Vierra	Safe
2 – Fast Songs	"Aku Milik Orang"	Dila	Safe
3 – Pop Rock	"Terkilan"	Haleeda	Safe
4 – Retro	"Cik Cik Keboom"	Saloma	Safe
5 – Traditional Songs	"Joget Rindu Bertahan"	Hjh Suzi & Isamuddin	Safe
6 – Duet with P2F Season 2 Contestants	"Sandarkan Pada Kenangan" (with Adeb)	Jamal Abdillah & Siti Sarah	Safe
7 – International Songs	"Bakit Pa"	Jessa Zaragoza	Safe
8 – Favourite Hits	"Sick and Tired"	Anastacia	Eliminated

== Music career ==
In July 2010, Eqah released her debut single, "If It Isn't With You" to radio stations in Brunei. It was a Top 3 hit on Brunei's Pelangi FM chart.

In January 2011, Eqah released the music video for her debut single "If It Isn't With You". It features American actor Rick Malambri and is directed by Amit & Naroop.

== Awards and nominations ==
Year	Award	Category	Position
2010	Cool-Tones Awards	Best Female	Nominated

== Discography ==
Singles

Year	Single	Album
2009	"If It Isn't With You": Released : August 2010	
