= R. B. Russell =

British publisher, editor, author, illustrator

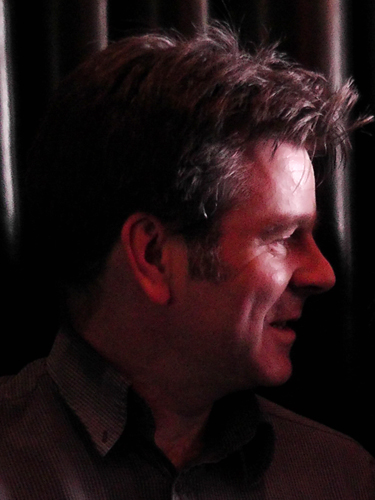
Russell in 2011

Ray B. Russell is an English publisher, editor, author, illustrator, songwriter, and film maker.

== Biography ==
Russell runs the award-winning Tartarus Press with Rosalie Parker, and for many years compiled the Guide to First Edition Prices. As an author he has had four collections of short stories, three novellas and four novels published. His story "Loup-garou" was chosen for Ellen Datlow’s The Best Horror of the Year. "In Hiding" was nominated for the 2010 World Fantasy Award, and "The Beautiful Room" for the 2011 British Fantasy Award. Michael Dirda has described Russell as "...among the leading practitioners of classic supernatural fiction".

His novella, Bloody Baudelaire, has been filmed by 3:1 Cinema with the new title Backgammon and was released 2016.

Russell has written full-length biographies of Robert Aickman and T. Lobsang Rampa.

He contributes artwork to Tartarus Press titles, and a selection of his art was on display at the Link Gallery, Dean Clough, Halifax, 2010/11.

Russell is also a songwriter, having previously composed songs released by The Bollweevils. His first solo CD, Ghosts, was released by Klanggalerie in February 2012. The accompanying video presentation was premiered in Vienna in March 2012, and was subsequently shown at Dean Clough Galleries October 2012. Dean Clough Galleries presented The Romance of Shortwave Radio Numbers Stations as a video installation in 2018.

Russell was the co-creator of C.W. Blubberhouse with Mark Valentine.

== Writing ==
Guide to First Edition Prices

- Eight editions, Tartarus Press, 1996, 1997, 1999, 2001, 2003, 2005, 2007 & 2010.

Short stories

- Putting the Pieces in Place, Ex Occidente Press (Bucharest, Romania), 2009.
- Literary Remains, PS Publishing (Hornsea, East Yorkshire), 2010.
- Leave Your Sleep, PS Publishing (Hornsea, East Yorkshire), 2012.
- Death Makes Strangers of Us All, Swan River Press (Dublin, Ireland), 2018.
- The Sanctuary and Other Strange Stories, Tartarus Press (Yorkshire), 2026.

Novellas

- Bloody Baudelaire, Ex Occidente Press (Bucharest, Romania), 2009.
- The Dark Return of Time, Swan River Press (Dublin, Ireland), 2014.
- The Stones are Singing, PS Publishing (Hornsea, East Yorkshire), 2016.

Novels

- She Sleeps, PS Publishing (Hornsea, East Yorkshire), 2017.
- Waiting for the End of the World, PS Publishing (Hornsea, East Yorkshire), 2020.
- Heaven's Hill, Zagava (Germany), 2021.
- The Woman Who Fell to Earth, Tartarus Press (Yorkshire), 2024.

Collected Edition

- Ghosts, Swan River Press (Dublin, Ireland), 2012. (Contains Putting the Pieces in Place and Bloody Baudelaire. Available with Ghosts CD in a limited edition.)

Non-fiction

- Occult Territory: An Arthur Machen Gazetteer, Tartarus Press (Yorkshire), 2019.
- Past Lives of Old Books and Other Essays, Tartarus Press (Yorkshire), 2020.
- Sylvia Townsend Warner: A Bibliography, Tartarus Press (Yorkshire), 2020.
- Robert Aickman: An Attempted Biography, Tartarus Press (Yorkshire), 2022.
- Fifty Forgotten Books, And Other Stories (Sheffield), 2022.
- Fifty Forgotten Records, Tartarus Press (Yorkshire), 2025.
- T. Lobsang Rampa And Other Characters of Questionable Faith, Tartarus Press (Yorkshire), 2025.
- Bibliomancy and Other Essays, Tartarus Press (Yorkshire), 2026.

Translation

- Le Grand Meaulnes by Alain-Fournier, Tartarus Press (Horam, Sussex), 1999.

== Music ==
- Ghosts, Klanggalerie (Austria), 2012.
- Bloody Baudelaire: A Soundtrack, Klanggalerie (Austria), 2014.
- The Romance of Shortwave Radio Numbers Stations, Persepolis, 2016.
- Copsford, (self released) 2020. Reissued Bladud Flies! 2021 Reissued Warm Noise 2022
- Phantom Cities by The Sodality of the Shadows, Persepolis, 2020.
- Heaven's Hill, 7" single, Zagava, 2012.

== Film/video ==
- Backgammon, 2016 (co-scriptwriter)
- Coverdale: A Year in the Life, 2016 (co-director/producer)
- Robert Aickman: Author of Strange Tales, 2015 (co-director/producer)
- Current 93: Live at Halifax Minster, 2014 (co-director/producer)
- Collecting Vinyl Records: A Personal History, 2012 (director/producer)
- A Mild Case of Bibliomania, 2011 (director/producer)
