= Terri (film) =

2011 film by Azazel Jacobs

- Theatrical release poster
- Directed by: Azazel Jacobs
- Screenplay by: Patrick deWitt
- Story by: Patrick deWitt; Azazel Jacobs
- Produced by: Alison Dickey; Hunter Gray; Lynette Howell; Alex Orlovsky
- Starring: Jacob Wysocki; Creed Bratton; Olivia Crocicchia; Bridger Zadina; John C. Reilly
- Cinematography: Tobias Datum
- Edited by: Darrin Navarro
- Music by: Mandy Hoffman
- Production companies: Verisimilitude; Silverwood Films; Periscope Entertainment; KnowMore Productions
- Distributed by: ATO Pictures
- Release dates: January 22, 2011 (Sundance); July 1, 2011 (United States)
- Running time: 105 minutes
- Country: United States
- Language: English
- Box office: $655,802

Terri is a 2011 American coming-of-age comedy-drama film directed by Azazel Jacobs from a screenplay by Patrick deWitt, based on a story by deWitt and Jacobs. It stars Jacob Wysocki in the title role, with Creed Bratton, Olivia Crocicchia, Bridger Zadina, and John C. Reilly in supporting roles. It revolves around an oversized teen misfit who strikes up a friendship with his garrulous but well-meaning vice-principal.

The film had its world premiere at the Sundance Film Festival on January 22, 2011, and was given a limited theatrical release in the United States on July 1, 2011, by ATO Pictures. It received positive reviews from critics, who mostly praised the performances of Wysocki and Reilly, while deWitt was nominated for Best First Screenplay at the 27th Independent Spirit Awards.

== Premise ==
Overweight and depressed 15-year-old Terri Thompson starts to slack off in school and wear pajamas, to the chagrin of his teachers. Soon Terri is taken under the wing of unconventional assistant principal Mr. Fitzgerald, who creates a series of Monday-morning counseling sessions for social outcasts at the school.

== Cast ==
- Jacob Wysocki as Terri Thompson, a shy, bullied, overweight teenager
- Creed Bratton as Uncle James, Terri's sick uncle for whom he is sole caregiver
- John C. Reilly as Darryl Fitzgerald, an unconventional but understanding assistant principal who takes Terri under his wing
- Bridger Zadina as Chad Markson, a mentally unstable student at Terri's school
- Olivia Crocicchia as Heather Miles, an outcast girl who was the victim of a sexual act
- Melanie Abramoff as Amy
- Tara Karsian as Mrs. Davidson, Terri's homeroom teacher
- Tim Heidecker as Mr. Flemisch, the gym teacher
- Mary Anne McGarry as Mrs. Hamish, the office receptionist
- Jenna Gavigan as Samantha Goode, the office receptionist
- Justin Prentice as Dirty Zach
- Eddie Pepitone as Joe Hollywood
- Nelson Mashita as Robert, the custodian
- Josh Perry as Marcus Bloom

== Production ==
The idea for Terri was conceived by Patrick deWitt in 2008, and the first pages of the screenplay were sent to Azazel Jacobs in early 2010. Jacobs received a "story by" credit, saying:

I had the full intention of being a co-writer, but after the story was developed and Pat started to send me pages, I soon saw there was not much for me to do other than slight edits and sequencing suggestions. After the first draft was completed it was very clear that it really came from him, and I pulled my [screenplay] credit.

Principal photography took place in Altadena and San Gabriel, California. Made for under $2 million, the film was shot in 23 days in June 2010.

== Release ==
In September 2010, ATO Pictures acquired U.S distribution rights to the film. International sales were handled by Visit Films. Terri had its world premiere at the Sundance Film Festival on January 22, 2011. It was then released in select theaters in New York and Los Angeles on July 1, and on DVD on October 12, 2011.

== Reception ==
=== Box office ===
Terri made $82,521 from six theaters in its opening weekend, an average of $13,754 per venue. The film ultimately grossed $655,802 in the United States.

=== Critical response ===
On the review aggregator website Rotten Tomatoes, 87% of 97 critics' reviews are positive, with an average rating of 7.1/10. The website's consensus reads: "Embodied with compelling sensitivity by newcomer Jacob Wysocki and supported by a wonderful John C. Reilly, Terri is an emotionally powerful character study." Metacritic, which uses a weighted average, assigned the film a score of 72 out of 100, based on 26 critics, indicating "generally favorable" reviews.

A. O. Scott of The New York Times stated, "What makes Terri special is that you don't feel pushed around by the narrative. Mr. Jacobs paces his scenes with a relaxed, almost dreamy rhythm and allows odd, interesting details to catch his ear and eye. […] The members of the cast, Mr. Wysocki in particular, are awkward in just the right way."

Ann Hornaday of The Washington Post gave the film 3 out of 4 stars and described it as "a small masterpiece of misdirection, a winsome, utterly unpredictable portrait of adolescence that flawlessly captures its cruelty and sweetness." Hornaday opined, "Thanks to Jacobs's observant eye and ear, Terri moves with the same endearing ease as its troubled but true-blue title character."

Betsy Sharkey of the Los Angeles Times wrote, "Jacobs and deWitt use Terri's circumstances to circle a series of serious, and seriously uncomfortable, issues. DeWitt captures the way people talk about a problem without talking about a problem."

Roger Ebert of the Chicago Sun-Times gave the film 4 out of 4 stars and noted, "The entire film moves at a human pace, not prodded by impatience or a desire to rush through the story. To view Terri after the manic thrashing of Transformers: Dark of the Moon was soothing and healing. It demonstrates how films can engage us in human life, rather than mocking it."

Peter Debruge of Variety remarked, "Terri may not be as personal as Jacobs' earlier work, but it feels every bit as genuine. The helmer's style, which finds poetry in cluttered, overgrown environments and potentially embarrassing situations, is perfectly suited to the material. Indeed, the filmmaking gives far more reason to get excited than the script."

David Rooney of The Hollywood Reporter commented, "It's not the most substantial movie and its delicate approach can seem rather studied, almost as if the director is trying on a style rather than adopting one that's an ideal fit. But there are many lovely, lingering moments."

Eric Kohn of IndieWire gave the film a grade of "A-" and wrote, "As with Momma's Man, Jacobs' rhythm in these scenes places emphasis on quiet reaction shots instead of extended conversation."

Logan Hill of Vulture opined, "Terri stands out for reminding us of the clumsy everyday horrors of high school. Compared to Twilight, the stakes appear small. But it's a movie about survival nonetheless."

=== Accolades ===
Year	Award	Category	Nominee	Result	Ref.
2011	21st Gotham Independent Film Awards	Breakthrough Actor	Jacob Wysocki	Nominated	
2012	18th Chlotrudis Awards	Best Supporting Actor	John C. Reilly	Nominated	
2012	27th Independent Spirit Awards	Best First Screenplay	Patrick deWitt	Nominated	
