= Olivia Crocicchia =

American actress from Connecticut

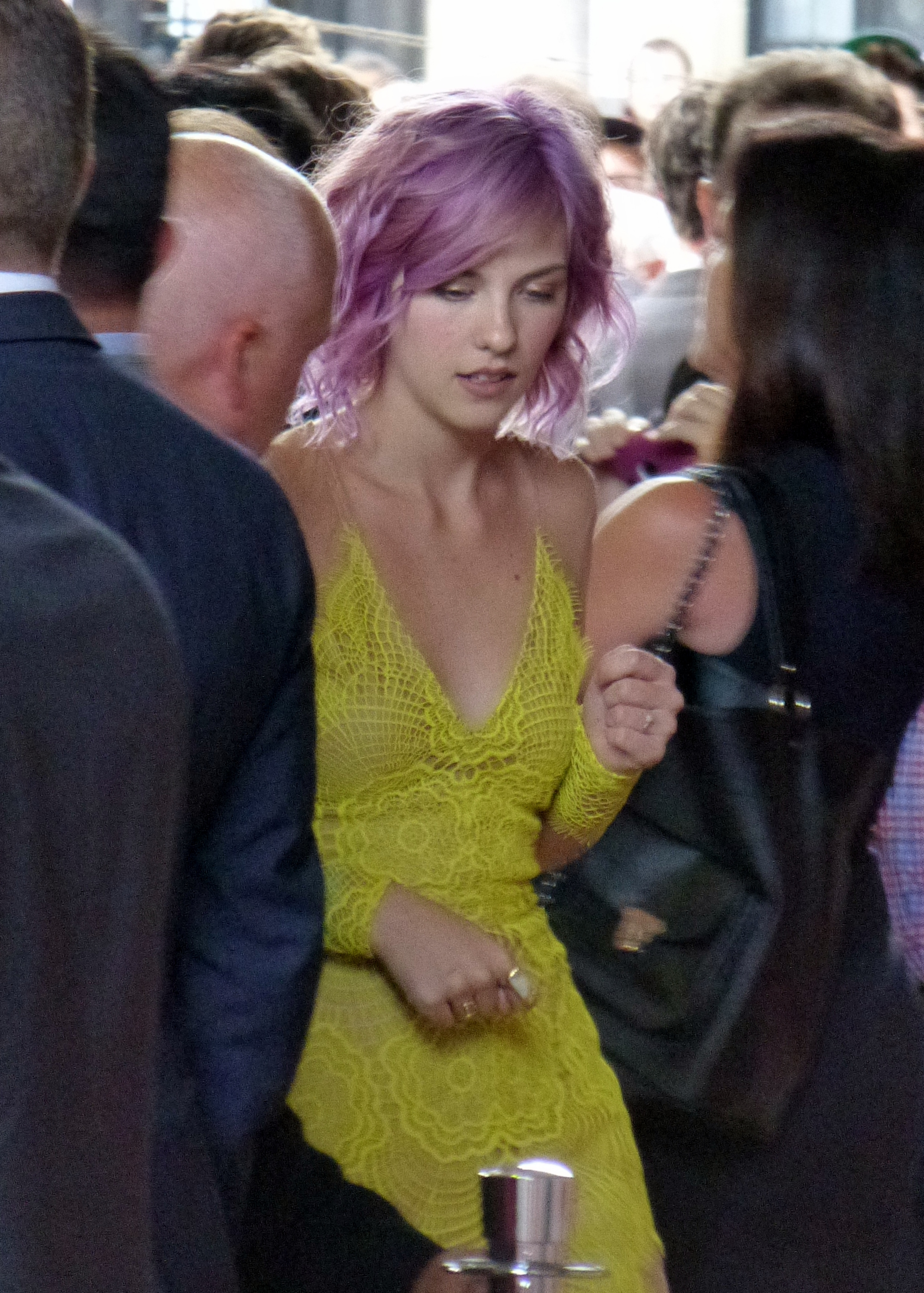
- Born: c. 1995 (age 30–31); Connecticut, U.S.
- Occupation: Actress
- Years active: 2003–present

Olivia Crocicchia (born c. 1995) is an American actress from Connecticut. She is known for her role as Katy Gavin, the daughter of Denis Leary's character, on FX's Rescue Me from 2004 to 2011. She was also a co-lead in the Lifetime television film I Killed My BFF in 2015.

== Filmography ==
Film roles
Year	Title	Role	Notes
2005	Walking on the Sky	Lisa	
2010	Almost Kings	Emily	
2011	Terri	Heather Miles	
2012	Besties	Sandy	
2013	Palo Alto	Chrissy	
2014	At the Devil's Door	Charlene	
2014	Men, Women & Children	Hannah Clint	
2014	Teacher of the Year	Faith Gregory	
2015	Accidental Love	Marsha Weber	
2015	Backgammon	Elizabeth	
2017	The Yellow Birds	Tess	
2017	Mom and Dad	Riley	
2017	Rio	Elle	
2020	She's in Portland	Bayla	

Television roles
Year	Title	Role	Notes
2003	Law & Order: Special Victims Unit	Courtney Jones	Episode: "Serendipity"
2004	Law & Order	Sophie Winslow	Episode: "Married with Children"
2004–2011	Rescue Me	Katy Gavin	Recurring role, 38 episodes
2011	CSI: NY	Kate Weber	Episode: "Crushed"
2013	Boomerang	Gemma	Failed television pilot
2015	Casual	Kelly	Episodes: "Friends", "..."
2015	I Killed My BFF	Heather Thomas	Television movie (Lifetime)
2020	Room 104	Jenna	Episodes: "Foam Party"

== Personal life ==
Olivia's father, Jim Crocicchia, is a former American football quarterback, who played for the Penn Quakers, then the New York Giants as a replacement player during the 1987 NFL strike.
