= Rick Malambri =

American actor, dancer, and model (born 1982)

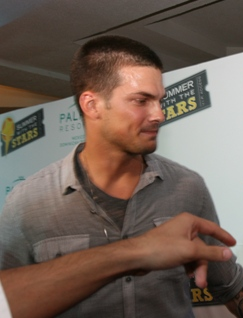
- Rick Malambri in 2012
- Born: November 7, 1982 (age 43); Fort Walton Beach, Florida, U.S.
- Occupations: Actor, Model
- Years active: 2004-present
- Spouses: Lisa Mae (m. 2010; div. 2024); Saffron Lanna (m. 2025)
- Children: 1

Rick Malambri (born November 7, 1982) is an American actor, dancer, and model. He is best known for starring in Step Up 3D, released in theaters on August 6, 2010.

== Early life ==
Malambri was born in Fort Walton Beach, Florida, to Jeannie Marie (née Egleston) and Timothy Michael Malambri. Malambri began his career as a model, having been featured in Abercrombie and Fitch ads in 2004.

== Career ==
In 2007, Malambri started his acting career by guest starring in shows such as How I Met Your Mother, Criminal Minds, and Party Down. Later that year, he played the role of Lt. Ash in the military science fiction film Universal Soldiers.

In 2010, Malambri landed lead role of Luke in the 3D dance film Step Up 3D alongside Sharni Vinson, directed by Jon M. Chu. He also starred as Will Dutton in Hallmark Channel movie After the Fall alongside Andrea Bowen. In 2011, he played the recurring role of Eduardo, a choreographer who becomes romantically involved with one of his students, in ABC Family's The Lying Game. He had minor roles in Clear History and Surrogates.

He starred as Duncan in the family comedy movie A Holiday Heist alongside Lacey Chabert and Vivica A. Fox. In 2014, Malambri starred as Joey D'Amico in the PixL TV movie The Cookie Mobster alongside Pippa Black and Mackenzie Foy. In 2016, he starred as Andy in the PixL TV movie Change of Heart alongside Leah Pipes. In 2018, he guest starred in an episode of TNT's Animal Kingdom. In 2021, Malambri starred as Mark in the Lifetime original movie Lethal Love Letter.

== Personal life ==
Malambri married model and actress Lisa Mae in 2010. They had a daughter in 2013. They separated in 2023 and divorced in August 2024. Rick remarried in June 2025 and has three school-aged step-children.

== Filmography ==
=== Film ===
Year	Title	Role	Notes
2007	Universal Soldiers	Lt. Ash	
2009	Surrogates	Clerk	
2010	Step Up 3D	Luke Katcher	

=== Television ===
Year	Title	Role	Notes
2007	How I Met Your Mother	Floppy Haired Guy	Episode: "Stuff"
2009	Criminal Minds	Dan Keller	Episode: "Conflicted"
2009	Party Down	Bran	Episode: "Stennheiser-Pong Wedding Reception"
2010	After the Fall	Will Dutton	Television film
2011	The Lying Game	Eduardo Diaz	6 episodes
2011	A Holiday Heist	Duncan	Television film
2013	Clear History	Flirty Guy at Fair	Television film
2013	Cosplaya	Crewman 1	Television film
2014	The Cookie Mobster	Joey D'Amico	Television film
2016	Change of Heart	Andy	Television film
2018	Animal Kingdom	Carter	Episode: "Prey"
2019	Jane the Virgin	Keith	Episode: "Chapter Eighty-Eight"
2021	Lethal Love Letter	Mark	Television film

=== video games ===
Year	Title	Role
2016	Gears of War 4	House of Sovereigns Gear (voice)

== Music Video Appearances ==
Artists	Song title
Britney Spears	If U Seek Amy
Roscoe Dash Feat T-Pain	I Got My Own Step
Eqah	If It isn't With You

..
