= If It Isn't with You =

"If It Isn't With You"

Single by Eqah
- Released: July 2010
- Recorded: June 2010
- Genre: Pop
- Length: 3:38
- Label: Sensible Records
- Songwriter(s): Deni Lew, Matt Thompson
- Producer(s): Deni Lew, Matt Thompson

"If It Isn't With You" is a song by Bruneian recording artist Eqah. It is her debut single, written and produced by Deni Lew and Matt Thompson. It reached the Top 3 on Brunei's Pelangi FM chart.

== Background and theme ==
The song is about longing for someone after a break-up. It is a dance track and uses the metaphor of being alone on the dance floor and longing for someone to dance with.

The song was released to Brunei radio stations in July 2010 and iTunes in August 2010.

== Charts ==
Chart	Peak position
Brunei Pelangi FM	2
