= Backgammon (film) =

- Noah Silver, Brittany Allen and Alex Beh in a scene from Backgammon.
- Directed by: Francisco Orvañanos
- Written by: Todd Niemi; R. B. Russell; Francisco Orvañanos
- Based on: Bloody Baudelaire by R. B. Russell
- Produced by: Francisco Orvañanos; Colin Stanfield; Miguel Angel Boccaloni; Chris B. Moore
- Starring: Brittany Allen; Noah Silver
- Cinematography: Simon Coull
- Edited by: John DiMare; Michael R. Fox
- Music by: Bryan Senti
- Production company: 3:1 Cinema
- Release dates: April 2015 (Sarasota Film Festival); March 2016
- Running time: 89 minutes
- Country: United States
- Language: English

Backgammon is an erotic mystery film, directed and co-written by Francisco Orvañanos.

== Synopsis ==
Young couple Lucian and Elizabeth arrive at their college friend Andrew's isolated mansion to spend the weekend. Andrew's sister, Miranda, and her boyfriend Gerald, an artist, are also there. Miranda is a playful and seductive character while Gerald enjoys antagonising the others, while frequently arguing with Miranda. After Gerald challenges Lucian to a game of poker and Gerald loses his possessions, Miranda throws Gerald out, and Lucian must come to terms with his increasing animal attraction to her. Gerald, meanwhile, never truly leaves, but prowls about the grounds laying traps for Lucian.

== Cast ==
- Brittany Allen as Miranda
- Noah Silver as Lucian
- Alex Beh as Gerald
- Olivia Crocicchia as Elizabeth
- Christian Alexander as Andrew

== Background ==
The film is based on the 2009 novella Bloody Baudelaire by R. B. Russell. The screenplay was written by Todd Niemi, R. B. Russell and Francisco Orvañanos, who also co-produced the film with Chris Moore.

The film stars Brittany Allen and Noah Silver. Also appearing in the film are Alex Beh, Christian Alexander and Olivia Crocicchia.

Filmed in the summer of 2012 in Cape Elizabeth, Maine, Backgammon premiered at the Sarasota Film Festival on April 17, 2015. In that same year it was also an official selection of both the Denver Film Festival and the St. Louis International Film Festival.

In 2016 Backgammon was released theatrically on March 11 in Los Angeles and New York, and in Denver on March 25.

== Reception ==
The film has received generally unfavorable reviews from critics. On Rotten Tomatoes it has a 0% approval rating, based on 6 reviews with an average rating of 2.4/10. On Metacritic it has a score of 22% based on reviews from 5 critics.
