= Sharon Pierre-Louis =

American actress

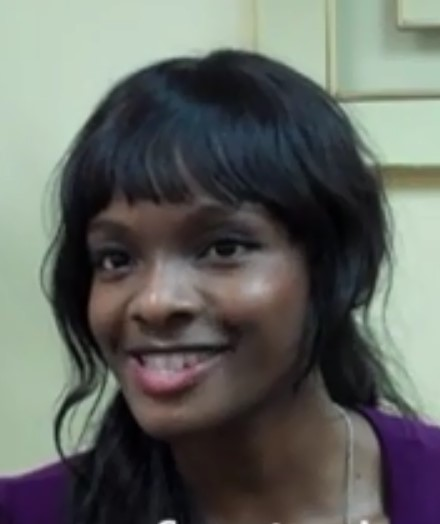
- Sharon Pierre-Louis
- Born: West Palm Beach, Florida, U.S.
- Occupation: Actress
- Years active: 2008–present

Sharon Pierre-Louis, (born February 27) is an American actress. She is best known for her recurring guest role on Freeform's Switched at Birth and her series regular role as Nisha Randall in The Lying Game.

== Life and career ==
Pierre-Louis was born and raised in south Florida to Haitian parents. Her parents had immigrated to the United States during the 1980s and she was their first child born in the United States. She has five other siblings, three of which were born in Haiti, also including an older brother who is Deaf. She became interested in acting during her sixth grade year later attending a performing arts middle/high school.

Her first major acting role was in Little Miss CEO (2008), which was a television pilot that was not picked up to series. In 2008, she had a recurring guest star role as Stacy Kingston, a lesbian character in the ABC Family drama Lincoln Heights. In 2009, she guest starred in an episode of CSI: Miami, had a small singing role in the film Fame and appeared in the short film Eckford.

In 2011, she was cast as Nisha Randall on the ABC Family series The Lying Game.

In 2012, she was cast as Little Jody in the Quentin Tarantino film Django Unchained.

In 2014 she was cast as Iris Watkins on the ABC Family series Switched at Birth in which she uses American Sign Language on the show.

Pierre-Louis is also a trained opera singer, fluent in Haitian Creole and American Sign Language.

== Filmography ==
=== Film ===
Year	Title	Role	Notes
2009	Eckford	Elizabeth Eckford	Short film
2009	Fame	Broadway Girl	
2012	Django Unchained	Little Jody	
2018	Electric Love	Sophie	
2019	Relations	Alix	Short film
2022	True Value	ASL Interpreter	Documentary

=== Television ===
Year	Title	Role	Notes
2008	Little Miss CEO	Courtney	Unsold TV pilot
2008	Lincoln Heights	Stacy Kingston	3 episodes
2009	CSI: Miami	Marie Gaudreau	Episode: "Count Me Out"
2011	The Lying Game	Nisha Randall	Series regular (5 episodes)
2013	Suburgatory	Daisy	Episode: "Body Talk"
2014–2017	Switched at Birth	Iris Watkins	Recurring role
2018	Grown	Ceci	8 episodes
2019	Speechless	Interpreter	Episode: "F-a-Fashion 4 A-All"
