= Misha Crosby =

British director, actor and producer (born 1987)

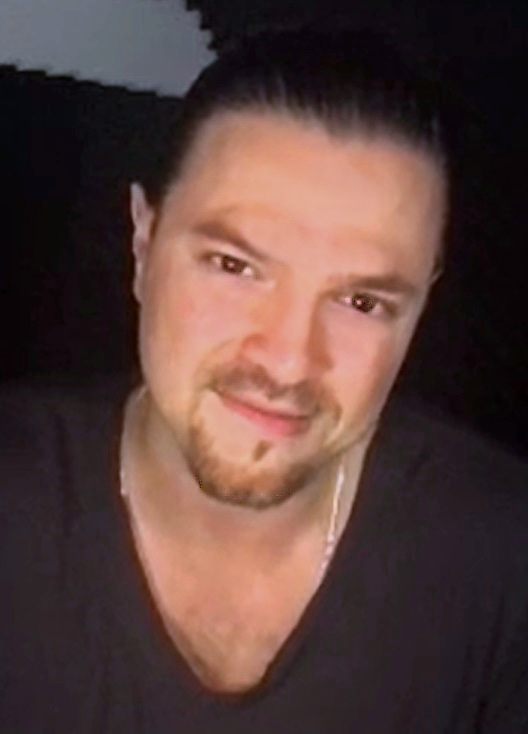
- Crosby in 2024
- Born: Misha Benjamin Crosby; 28 January 1987 (age 39); London, UK
- Education: Drama Studio London
- Occupations: Director, Actor, Producer
- Years active: 2005–present

Misha Crosby (born 28 January 1987) is a British director, actor, producer and Radio Academy Award nominee.

== Early life ==
Crosby was born and brought up in London. He won The Helmore Music Scholarship to Mill Hill School and lead a world premier on the violin at the Wigmore Hall at 14 years old. He performed for the National Youth Music Theatre.

== Career ==
He previously starred in the BBC television series Holby City as Sam Strachan's son Kieron, in Channel 4's Hollyoaks and has had various guest appearances in other TV shows. From 2011-2012 he played Ryan Harwell in the ABC Family television series The Lying Game.

Film roles include, Abbas in the award-winning British feature film Life Goes On, and he stars in Beyond Paradise playing the pivotal role of the traumatized loner Ray alongside Ryan Guzman, Francia Raisa and Daphne Zuniga.

The film 6 Years, 4 Months & 23 Days in which Crosby plays Rick, won the Copper Wing: Best Live Action Short Film, at the Phoenix Film Festival 2013.

In 2015, he was offered a series regular role in BitTorrent’s first Original TV series Children of The Machine by Marco Webber (Brooklyn’s Finest, Igby Goes Down). The series is set to be produced by Rapid Eye Studios and is the first show to be distributed directly through BitTorrent to an audience of 170 million viewers.

He was cast in season 9 of American Horror Story AHS 1984 as Limahl, the leader of Kajagoogoo, and has his throat slit in episode 7 "The Lady in White" by Robert Ramirez. He subsequently returns as a ghost from Episode 8, "Rest In Pieces".

Lionsgate acquired the Cannabis thriller Green Rush, starring Crosby, Paul Telfer, Mike Foy, Kriss Dozal, and Andre Fili for an April 2020 release. The movie was produced by Crosby, Urijah Faber, Rick Lee, and Gerard Roxburgh.

In 2020, Crosby was named as the series showrunner & director of Unsinkable starring John Malkovich, Brian Cox, Thomas Brodie-Sangster, Nathalie Emmanuel and Harry Hamlin. It was nominated for a Radio Academy Award for Best Drama or Fiction and also earned a nomination for Best Limited Series & Special, Scripted Fiction at the 29th Annual Webby Awards.

Sponsored by Audible

== Filmography ==
List of television and films credits
Year	Title	Role
2005	28 Acts in 28 Minutes (TV series)	Himself
2007	Roanoke The Lost Coloney (Film)	Tom Alexander
2008	Companion (Film)	Alexander the Great
2008-2009	Holby City (TV series)	Kieron Patel
2009	Hollyoaks (TV series)	Wade
2009	Genie In The House (TV series)	Jake Burns
2009	Life Goes On (Film)	Abbas
2010	The Bill (TV series)	Ian Baker
2011	Rouge (TV pilot)	Nunez
2011	Party Like the Queen of France (TV film)	Amadeus Kreutzer
2012	The Lying Game (TV series)	Ryan Harwell
2012	6 Years, 4 Months & 23 Days (Film)	Rick
2015	Who's Who (Film)	Daniels, Producer
2016	Beyond Paradise	Ray
2019	American Horror Story: 1984	Limahl

== Awards and nominations ==
Year	Association	Category	Title of work	Result
2025	The Radio Academy ARIAS	Best Drama or Fiction Award 2025 Sponsored by Audible	UNSINKABLE	Nominee
2025	Webby Awards	Best Limited Series & Special, Scripted Fiction	UNSINKABLE	Nominee
2025	BBC Audio Drama Awards	Best Actor - Thomas Brodie Sangster	UNSINKABLE	Nominee
2015	Action On Film International Film Festival	Xristos Award - Best Actor (Sponsored by Sony & The Stella Adler Academy LA)	Who's Who	Won
2015	Action On Film International Film Festival	Best Dialogue	Who's Who	Won
2013	Phoenix Film Festival	Best Live Action Short Film	6 Years, 4 Months & 23 Days	Won
2013	San Jose International Short Film Festival	World Cinema - Audience Award	6 Years, 4 Months & 23 Days	Won
