= Backgammon (1988 video game) =

- Developer(s): Bray Research
- Publisher(s): Atari UK
- Series: Atari Mindgames
- Platform(s): Atari ST
- Release: 1988
- Genre(s): Strategy

Backgammon is a 1988 computer version of the strategy board game published by Atari UK.

== Gameplay ==
Backgammon is a game in which backgammon is played on the Atari ST. It features ten levels of play, a facility for action replay, and an ability to take back and restore the last move.

This game was part of Atari's Mindgames Series.

== Reception ==
Reception

Review score
Publication	Score
The Games Machine (UK)	53%

Brian Walker reviewed Backgammon for Games International magazine, and gave it 2 stars out of 5, and stated that "To sum up; the program does not even reach intermediate level. Perhaps it might offer something if you learned the game over a plate of souvlaki and chips on a Greek island and wish to advance your understanding somewhat."

The Games Machine found this game "dull" but conceded that it might be good for improving a player's skills at backgammon, but felt that players would have more fun on a real board.

John Sweeney for Page 6 found that this version of Backgammon was "probably best for beginners" due to the ability to set the difficulty level.
