= Christian Alexander =

American actor (born 1990)

- Born: April 14, 1990 (age 36); Athens, Greece
- Other name: Christian Ivanov
- Occupation: Actor
- Years active: 2006–present

Christian Alexander (born April 14, 1990) is an American actor, best known for his role as Kiefer Bauer on the American daytime drama General Hospital.

== Life and career ==
Born to Bulgarian parents in Athens, Alexander is a graduate of Beverly Hills High School in Beverly Hills, California. He formerly competed in gymnastics. Alexander has appeared in a number of television series, most notably over sixty episodes of General Hospital from June 18, 2009 to April 6, 2010. In 2011, he appeared in ABC Family's The Lying Game.

== Filmography ==
=== Film ===
Year	Title	Role	Notes
2009	Half Truth	Johnny	Short film
2009	Level 26: Dark Origins	Chris Smith	Short film
2010	Almost Kings	Zach	
2015	Backgammon	Andrew	

=== Television ===
Year	Title	Role	Notes
2006	Zoey 101	Harry	Episode: "Broadcast Views"
2007	Medium	Young Casey Edward Frank	Episode: "The Whole Truth"
2008	Grey's Anatomy	Will	Episode: "Freedom"
2008	Lincoln Heights	Jed McCall	Episode: "Sex, Lies, and Secrets"
2008	The Suite Life on Deck	Evan	Episode: "Broke N Yo-Yo"
2009	Eastwick	Gus	3 episodes
2009–2010	General Hospital	Kiefer Bauer	62 episodes
2011	Keeping Up with the Randalls	Mitch Randall	Television film
2011–2013	The Lying Game	Thayer Rybak	Recurring; 29 episodes
