= Alexandra Chando =

American actress

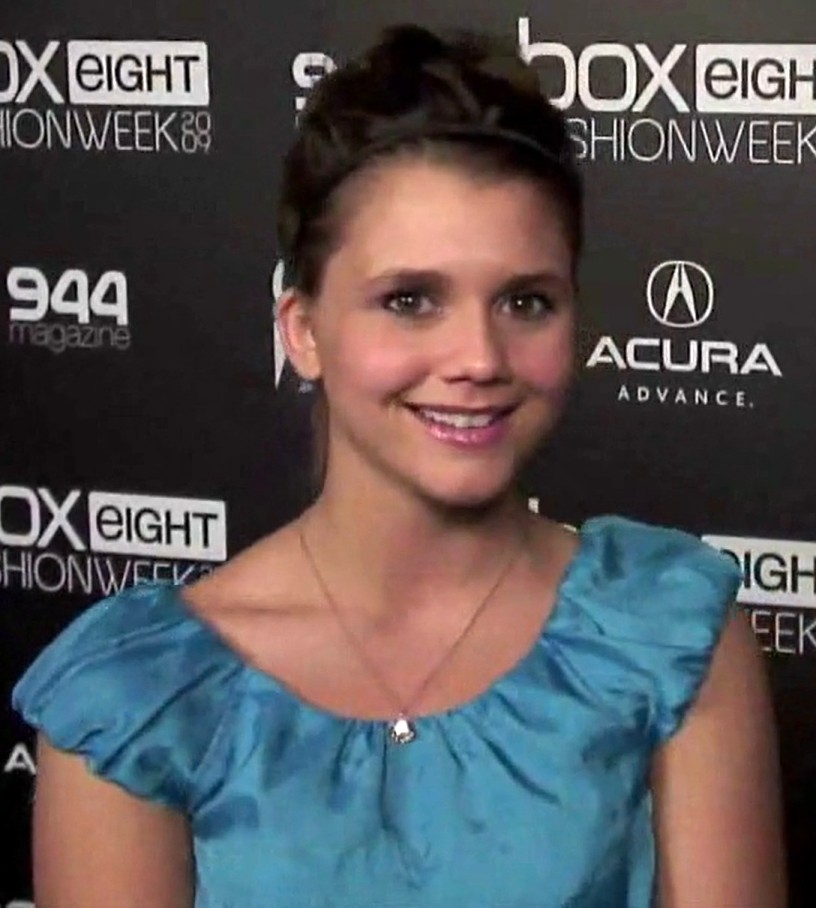
- Chando in 2009
- Born: July 28, 1986 (age 40); Bethlehem, Pennsylvania, U.S.
- Education: Manhattan College
- Occupation: Actress
- Years active: 2002–present

Alexandra Chando (born July 28, 1986) is an American actress and director. She is known for her role as Maddie Coleman in the CBS soap opera, As the World Turns and for her dual role as identical twins, Emma Becker and Sutton Mercer in the ABC Family drama series, The Lying Game.

== Early life and education ==
Chando is a native of Bethlehem, Pennsylvania, where she graduated from Liberty High School. Her father, Steve Chando, has his own commercial roofing company in Bethlehem called CHM Contracting, and her mother, Rebecca, is a homemaker. She has two older brothers.

Chando attended Manhattan College before becoming an actress.

== Career ==
Chando originated the role of Maddie Coleman on the television soap opera As the World Turns, which she played from 2005 to 2007 and again for several months beginning in late 2009 and ended in early 2010. Her experience of being cast on As the World Turns was chronicled in the episode "I'm Getting My Big Break" from the MTV documentary series, True Life. She received a 2007 Daytime Emmy Award nomination in the Younger Actress Category.

In 2009, Chando was cast as Deb in The WB web series Rockville CA from Josh Schwartz. She screen-tested with Robert Pattinson for the leading role in the 2010 film Remember Me, and auditioned for the role of Elena Gilbert, in The CW television series The Vampire Diaries. In 2011, she played Danielle Anderson in the web series Talent, which is based on the novel series by Zoey Dean. Later, Chando was cast as identical twins Emma Becker and Sutton Mercer in the ABC Family series The Lying Game, which ran for two seasons until it was cancelled by the network. After The Lying Game ended, she appeared on an episode of the television series Castle, playing "a Lindsay Lohan/Miley Cyrus type".

In 2018, Chando made her directorial debut with her short film LPM, Likes Per Minute. It screened at the inaugural Mammoth Film Festival, where Chando also serves as Festival Manager.

== Filmography ==
=== Film ===
Year	Title	Role	Notes
2011	The Bleeding House	Gloria Smith / Blackbird	
2015	Construction	Colleen	
2019	The Baby Proposal	Layla	also known as ComeBack Kid

=== Television ===
Year	Title	Role	Notes
2002	House Blend	Jenna Harper	Unsold television pilot
2005–2007; 2009–2010	As the World Turns	Maddie Coleman	Role held: July 27, 2005 – October 26, 2007; September 23, 2009 – February 10, 2010
2006	True Life	Herself	Episode: "I'm Getting My Big Break"
2009	Sherri	Cab Passenger	Episode: "Dating Dad"
2010	Medium	Melissa Treynet	Episode: "Dead Meat"
2010	Glory Daze	Annabelle	2 episodes
2011–2013	The Lying Game	Emma Becker / Sutton Mercer	Lead role
2014	Castle	Mandy Sutton	Episode: "Limelight"
2015	Hindsight	Noelle	3 episodes
2015	Dead People	Pearl	Unsold television pilot
2016	Outcast	Lisa Peyton	Episode: "From the Shadows It Watches"
2017	The Vampire Diaries	Tara	Episode: "We Have History Together"
2017	Hawaii Five-0	Monique Sims	Episode: "Make Me Kai"
2017	Wisdom of the Crowd	Lizzie Moore	Episode: "Alpha Test"
2018	The Neighborhood	Chloe	Episode: "Welcome to the Dinner Guest"
2019	Sneaky Pete	Natalie Sheffield	3 episodes
2020	The Dinner Party	Herself	Also creator and executive producer; episode: "Pilot"
2025	Bad Thoughts	Kerri Sorenson	Episode: "Success"

=== Web ===
Year	Title	Role	Notes
2009	Rockville CA	Deb	Main role; 20 episodes
2011	Talent	Danielle Anderson	Main role; 10 episodes

=== As a director ===
Year	Title	Notes
2018	LPM, Likes Per Minute	Short film, also executive producer
2020	The Dinner Party	Web series
2021	Deserted	Short film

== Awards and nominations ==
Year	Award	Category	Title	Result	Ref.
2007	Daytime Emmy Award	Outstanding Younger Actress in a Drama Series	As the World Turns	Nominated	
