= The Lying Game =

American drama television series

- Genre: Mystery; Thriller; Teen drama
- Based on: The Lying Game by Sara Shepard
- Developed by: Charles Pratt, Jr.
- Starring: Alexandra Chando; Allie Gonino; Blair Redford; Andy Buckley; Helen Slater; Kirsten Prout; Alice Greczyn; Charisma Carpenter; Christian Alexander; Sharon Pierre-Louis
- Opening theme: "Gun for a Tongue" by Butterfly Boucher
- Composers: Pieter A. Schlosser; Brian Adler (pilot)
- Country of origin: United States
- Original language: English
- No. of seasons: 2
- No. of episodes: 30 (list of episodes)

Production
- Executive producers: Charles Pratt, Jr.; Leslie Morgenstein; Gina Girolamo; Fred Gerber; Mark Piznarski
- Producers: Randy Sutter; Carol Dunn Trussell; R. Lee Fleming Jr.
- Camera setup: Red Two; single-camera
- Running time: 42 minutes
- Production companies: Pratt Enterprises; Alloy Entertainment; Warner Horizon Television

Original release
- Network: ABC Family
- Release: August 15, 2011 – March 12, 2013

The Lying Game is an American teen drama mystery television series developed by Charles Pratt Jr. It premiered on ABC Family on August 15, 2011, and ended on March 12, 2013. The series was produced by Pratt Enterprises, Alloy Entertainment, and Warner Horizon Television and is loosely based on a series of books of the same name by Sara Shepard. It stars Alexandra Chando, playing as the twin sisters Sutton Mercer and Emma Becker. On July 15, 2013, Chando confirmed the series was canceled by the network after two seasons.

== Series overview ==
The series follows Emma Becker, a kind-hearted foster child in Vegas who learns she has an identical twin sister named Sutton Mercer in Phoenix. Sutton, unlike Emma, was adopted by wealthy parents and is seemingly living an ideal life. Emma runs away from Vegas to Phoenix to meet Sutton after wrongful accusations about her were made. After their initial meeting, Sutton talks Emma into stepping into her life for a few days while she pursues a lead on the mysterious identity of their birth mother. After Sutton inexplicably fails to return to the girls’ designated meeting place, Emma must decide whether to come clean about her identity and risk her own safety in the hope of uncovering her twin sister's whereabouts, along with the truth about why they were separated in the first place.

The series ended after 30 episodes on an unresolved cliffhanger, leaving open questions.

== Episodes ==
Season	Episodes	Originally released	
Season	Episodes	First released	Last released
1	20	August 15, 2011	March 5, 2012
2	10	January 8, 2013	March 12, 2013

== Cast and characters ==
The main cast of The Lying Game.

While the television series shares many of the same characters as the book series of the same name, there are important differences (chief among them that Sutton is deceased in the books):

=== Main ===
- Alexandra Chando as Sutton Mercer and Emma Becker (Emma Paxton in the books). Sutton was adopted by a wealthy family in Phoenix, Arizona and Emma grew up in the foster care system in Nevada, even though initially she was supposed to be adopted by a family in Beverly Hills.
- Allie Gonino as Laurel Mercer. Laurel is Sutton and Emma's paternal half-sister and the biological daughter of Kristin and Ted Mercer. She bonded with Emma and tends to go to her for advice.
- Blair Redford as Ethan Whitehorse. He is initially Sutton's secret boyfriend, hiding the relationship due to class, but soon falls for Emma after finally realizing that Sutton was ashamed of their relationship. He later cheated on Emma with Sutton, realizing a part of him will always love her, causing Emma to break up with him.
- Andy Buckley as Ted Mercer, a plastic surgeon. Ted is the biological father of Sutton, Emma, and Laurel. He had an affair with Rebecca seventeen years prior to the series, resulting in the conception of Sutton and Emma.
- Helen Slater as Kristin Mercer. Kristin is the adoptive mother of Sutton and the biological mother of Laurel. She is oblivious to Sutton's biological history. Her relationship with her husband became strained when she learned of his past relationship with Rebecca, demanding a divorce and ownership of everything they owned.
- Kirsten Prout as Charlotte "Char" Chamberlin (season 1), a friend of Sutton's and daughter of Phylis Chamberlin. She is also a cousin to both Sutton and Emma, via Phylis' sister Rebecca Sewell (Sutton and Emma's birth mother).
- Alice Greczyn as Madeline Margo Rybak, known as "Mads". Mads is the daughter of Alec and the maternal younger half-sister of Thayer. She is initially one of Sutton's best friends, but ends their friendship after discovering all of Sutton's lies and that Sutton had come onto her boyfriend. She then becomes best friends with Emma after learning the truth about the twins. She begins a complicated relationship with Jordan, her step-sibling, in season 2 after spending a one-night stand with him, not realizing he is her step-brother until later on.
- Christian Alexander as Thayer Rybak, the former step-son of Alec and the maternal older half-brother of Mads. He has had feelings for Sutton since childhood, and gets involved with her in LA by sleeping with her. When he realized Sutton didn't want him, he moved back to Phoenix and met Emma, whom he developed feelings for. Despite being in a strong relationship, it ends when he gets jealous of Emma's potential feelings for her ex-boyfriend Ethan.
- Sharon Pierre-Louis as Nisha Randall (season 1), Sutton's rival.
- Charisma Carpenter as Annie Rebecca Sewell (season 2, recurring previously), Rebecca is Phyllis Chamberlin's estranged younger sister and Char's aunt. She returns to town after many years, now going by her middle name. Her motive for coming back to town was to reunite with Ted. She married Alec at the end of season one in order to achieve this plan.

=== Recurring ===
- Adrian Pasdar as Alec Rybak, the father of Mads and the stepfather of Thayer. He is Ted's best friend. His ex-wife Caroline is the mother of both children and she ran away a long time ago with Thayer's biological father, which might be the reason as to why he resents Thayer. In the season one finale, he marries Rebecca, and is arrested for the murder of Derek Rogers. He was cleared with Theresa's help at the beginning of the second season. He knew about the twins all along and turns out to be the one who split them up at birth. He has been spending his time trying to get Rebecca convicted for the two murders that have occurred, though Rebecca insists that he himself is hiding the real killer.
- Tyler Christopher as Dan Whitehorse, a police officer and Ethan's older brother. He used to work for Alec, but turned against him when Alec tried to have Ethan charged with murder. He later proposes to his former sweetheart Theresa, set on having a future together, but the two never make it to the altar due to her mysterious and abrupt murder.
- Adam Brooks as Baz, Laurel's fellow band member in Strangeworthy. Laurel kissed him after she and Justin broke up, though their relationship never grew into something more.
- Randy Wayne as Justin Miller (season 1), Laurel's ex-boyfriend. In episode 13, it is revealed that his mother died during an operation due to Ted's carelessness. Laurel ultimately breaks up with him when she finds out he used her to get close to her father.
- Ben Elliott as Derek Rogers (season 1), Alec's accomplice and Charlotte's ex-boyfriend. Alec hired him to get information on Sutton. He was the one in Sutton's car the night she drove into a lake. He is found dead the morning after Ethan and Sutton interrogate him about what happened.
- Sydney Barrosse as Phyllis Chamberlin (season 1), Char's mother and Rebecca's sister. She is an alcoholic. After she left Sutton's birthday party drunk and got a DUI, Rebecca tells Alec to put Phyllis on mandatory lockdown at a rehab facility.
- Rick Malambri as Eduardo Diaz (season 1), Mads and Char's ballet teacher who had a secret affair with Mads. When Alec learned about Mads and Eduardo, he paid Eduardo to leave town. He was in an accident on his way out of town and fell into a coma before being transferred to a new hospital.
- Misha Crosby as Ryan Harwell (season 1), one of the students at Arroyo High. He has a "bad boy" reputation and dated Mads for a short time before he broke up with her due to her father's arrest. It was revealed that he had hooked up with Sutton a few years ago.
- Yara Martinez as Theresa Lopez, Dan's fiancėe and an attorney. Dan calls her to defend Ethan when he is on trial for murdering Derek. She wins Ethan's case due to lack of evidence. In an attempt to find Derek's real killer, she gets herself murdered on the night before her wedding to Dan, they thought it was because of drowning. She was found dead in a pool but, the autopsy showed that she had been killed many days before that because of many blunt objects hitting her head.
- Ryan Rottman as Jordan Lyle (season 2), Rebecca's former stepson from her marriage to Marvin Lyle in Los Angeles. During his first night in town, Jordan has a one-night stand with Mads. He has also gained interest in Laurel and has become good friends with Ethan. He attends Arroyo High. Rebecca has been getting him to do some of her dirty work in exchange for her keeping his dark secrets in the past, although Rebecca eventually turns on him when he refuses to leave town with her after Alec and Dan try to get her arrested. He is arrested for the murder of his brother back in Los Angeles. (Note: Initially in Season 1 episode 19, we learn the name of Rebecca's ex-husband is Marvin Jenns. But, a season 2 retcon changed this to Marvin Lyle, with his son being Jordan Lyle.)

== Production ==
ABC Family green-lit a pilot for The Lying Game, which was written and executive produced by Charles Pratt Jr. and which was based upon the then upcoming novel by Pretty Little Liars author Sara Shepard, in October 2010. Alexandra Chando was cast in the dual lead role in November 2010. ABC Family ordered The Lying Game to series in February 2011. It premiered on Monday, August 15, 2011, after an episode of The Secret Life of the American Teenager, drawing 1.4 million viewers. ABC back-ordered an additional 10 episodes of season 1 in September 2011, which premiered in January 2012 drawing a series high 1.8 million viewers.

The Lying Game was renewed for a second season by ABC Family in April 2012, with production to take place during summer 2012 for a winter premiere. Charisma Carpenter, who had been recurring in season 1, was promoted to the main cast for season 2 in July 2012. Season 2 premiered on January 8, 2013, drawing 1.55 million viewers; the final episode of season 2 aired in March 2013. ABC Family took an unusually long time to decide whether or not to renew The Lying Game beyond season 2, and the cast's contract options lapsed in April 2013 with only Chando signing a new option. ABC Family finally confirmed the cancellation of The Lying Game in July 2013, after Chando had herself announced the news on Twitter and Instagram.

== Home media and streaming ==
The series was available to stream on The CW's free digital-only network, CW Seed when the service was active

== Reception ==
=== Critical response ===
TV Fanatic writer Leigh Raines rated the pilot episode five out of five stars. She went on to say "If the mark of a good show is when it leaves you wanting more, The Lying Game definitely accomplished that goal." Melody Simpson of Buzz Focus, also reviewed the pilot and stated, "While this is not exactly a series one would watch with the entire family, the older audiences will surely enjoy this series as much as the younger audiences." Pittsburgh Post-Gazette's writer Rob Owen compared the show as a "lighter, better executed version of the fall CW pilot Ringer."

=== Ratings ===
Season	Time slot (ET)	# Ep.	Premiered		Ended		TV season	Viewers (in millions)
Season	Time slot (ET)	# Ep.	Date	Premiere Viewers (in millions)	Date	Finale Viewers (in millions)	TV season	Viewers (in millions)
1	Monday; 9:00 pm	20	August 15, 2011	1.39	March 5, 2012	1.24	2011–12	1.38
2	Tuesday; 9:00 pm	10	January 8, 2013	1.55	March 12, 2013	1.11	2013	1.27

== See also ==
- List of television shows set in Las Vegas
