= Pretty Little Liars season 4 =

Pretty Little Liars
- Season 4
- Season 4 DVD cover
- Starring: Troian Bellisario; Ashley Benson; Tyler Blackburn; Lucy Hale; Ian Harding; Laura Leighton; Shay Mitchell; Janel Parrish; Sasha Pieterse
- No. of episodes: 24

Release
- Original network: ABC Family
- Original release: June 11, 2013 – March 18, 2014

Season chronology
- ← Previous; Season 3 Next → Season 5

The fourth season of the American mystery drama television series Pretty Little Liars began airing on ABC Family on June 11, 2013. The season consisted of 24 episodes, which were filmed between March 14, 2013, and November 2, 2013. The season concluded its broadcast on March 18, 2014.

The season continues from where it left off in the third-season finale, where the girls were rescued from the burning building by who they believe is Alison. The girls begin looking for answers that could lead to Alison's whereabouts while dealing with the aftermath of Detective Wilden's murder and "A" intervening in their personal lives. It introduces new characters to the story, including Detective Gabriel Holbrook and Lieutenant Linda Tanner, played by Sean Faris and Roma Maffia, who are brought in to investigate the deaths of Detective Wilden and Detective Reynolds. Ella Montgomery (Holly Marie Combs) and Byron Montgomery (Chad Lowe) left the main cast.

The fourth season garnered positive reviews from critics and averaged 2.74 million viewers an episode, down from the previous season, and a 1.1 demo rating, even with the previous season. The premiere was watched by 3.37 million viewers while the finale watched by 3.12 million viewers.

== Overview ==
The first half of the fourth season focuses on the aftermath of Detective Darren Wilden's murder. Being last seen with Wilden before his murder, Ashley (Laura Leighton) is made a prime suspect and arrested. The girls work to find out who A is in hopes of finding Wilden's murderer. Meanwhile, Hanna (Ashley Benson) deals with her mother's arrest and trial. Spencer (Troian Bellisario) helps Toby (Keegan Allen) with finding answers about his mother's untimely death while trying to keep him from falling victim to "A"'s schemes. Aria (Lucy Hale) tries to break free from her feelings toward Ezra (Ian Harding) by pursuing a relationship with Jake (Ryan Guzman). Emily (Shay Mitchell) suffers an injury that ends her swim career, which complicates her college application process.

After finding several new clues, the girls believe that Alison may be alive. Towards the middle of the season, they find a connection Alison (Sasha Pieterse) had in Ravenswood and go there to find "A" and Alison. In Ravenswood, Emily is kidnapped and locked in a box on a sawmill by Red Coat. The girls notice Red Coat running to the Sawmill and follow her inside, where she actually saves Emily. At this point, another Red Coat shows up and is unmasked as CeCe Drake (Vanessa Ray), while the other Red Coat, whom they believe is Alison, leads Spencer to an apartment, believed to be owned by "A", where they conclude that "A" is male. They later find Alison's contact, Mrs. Grunwald (Meg Foster), who tells them that Alison is alive. The girls search Ravenswood to find her but she meets them back at Rosewood and is revealed as the "good" Red Coat, telling them she is still in danger, so she can not return until it is safe. Meanwhile, it is revealed that the apartment is owned by Ezra, seemingly revealing that he is "A".

The second half deals with the girls' attempts to learn more about what happened during the summer, who "A" is, and how to bring Alison home. Meanwhile, Spencer begins taking amphetamines to help cope with the workload from school, but develops a dependency on them, igniting a drug problem that, unbeknownst to the others, occurred before. Aria grows closer to Ezra, whom the other girls believe is "A", but breaks it off after learning that he has actually been writing a book about Alison's disappearance and knew her when they met. Hanna mends her broken heart by pursuing a relationship with Travis (Luke Kleintank) and an interest in mystery novels, which leads to a friendship with Detective Holbrook (Sean Faris).

Aria tells the girls that Ezra thinks one of them is 'A', but the suspicion later shifts to Jessica Dilaurentis, Alison's mother, after reading more of the notes on Ezra's manuscript. Emily later tells Paige that Alison is alive, and Paige betrays her trust by tipping off the police. Suspecting that they can find clues at Ali's house, Hanna volunteers the girls for Jessica's bridal fashion charity show. Once they get into Ali's old room, they find a password to an email address written on a post-it note. They contact the number, and Alison calls back, telling them to meet her in Philadelphia. They are met by Noel Kahn who brings the girls to Manhattan. There, Alison recounts the events that happened on the night she disappeared. The girls then try to put the pieces together to figure out who 'A' is. However, a hooded figure - seemingly "A" himself - attacks the girls and corners them on the rooftop with a gun. Ezra suddenly shows up and tries to intervene, but is shot in the ensuing scuffle. The last scene shows Jessica DiLaurentis' lifeless body being dragged across the lawn, before being buried by 'A'.

== Cast ==
=== Main cast ===
- Troian Bellisario as Spencer Hastings
- Ashley Benson as Hanna Marin
- Lucy Hale as Aria Montgomery
- Tyler Blackburn as Caleb Rivers^{1}
- Ian Harding as Ezra Fitz
- Shay Mitchell as Emily Fields
- Janel Parrish as Mona Vanderwaal
- Sasha Pieterse as Alison DiLaurentis
- Laura Leighton as Ashley Marin

=== Recurring cast ===
- Andrea Parker as Jessica DiLaurentis
- Lesley Fera as Veronica Hastings
- Lindsey Shaw as Paige McCullers
- Keegan Allen as Toby Cavanaugh
- Sean Faris as Detective Gabriel Holbrook
- Ryan Guzman as Jake
- Cody Allen Christian as Mike Montgomery
- Luke Kleintank as Travis Hobbs
- Aeriél Miranda as Shana Fring
- Nia Peeples as Pam Fields
- Nolan North as Peter Hastings
- Tammin Sursok as Jenna Marshall
- Vanessa Ray as CeCe Drake

=== Guest cast ===
- Larisa Oleynik as Maggie Cutler
- Roma Maffia as Lieutenant Linda Tanner
- Torrey DeVitto as Melissa Hastings
- Holly Marie Combs as Ella Montgomery
- Chad Lowe as Byron Montgomery
- Eric Steinberg as Wayne Fields
- John O'Brien as Arthur Hackett
- Meg Foster as Carla Grunwald
- Bryce Johnson as Darren Wilden
- Roark Critchlow as Tom Marin
- Wyatt Nash as Nigel Wright
- Nick Tate as Dr. Louis Palmer
- Wes Ramsey as Jesse Lindall
- Nathaniel Buzolic as Dean Stavros
- Jed Rees as Hector Lime
- Joseph Zinsman as Robert Vargas
- Julian Morris as Wren Kingston
- Jim Titus as Barry Maple
- Ryan Merriman as Ian Thomas
- Brant Daugherty as Noel Kahn
- Drew Van Acker as Jason DiLaurentis
- Steve Talley as Zack
- Brandon W. Jones as Andrew Campbell
- Rumer Willis as Zoe
- Nicole Gale Anderson as Miranda Collins
- Brett Dier as Luke Matheson
- Skyler Day as Claire
- Elizabeth Whitson as Leah Matheson
- Mark Schroeder as Brendan McGowen
- Michael Grant as Connor
- Marcia Clark as Sidney Barnes
- Nicole L. Sullivan as Tina
- Rose Abdoo as Dr. Sandy
- Nick Roux as Riley
- Michelle Hurd as Elizabeth Mainway

- ^Note 1: Tyler Blackburn is credited as a series regular up until episode 14. From episode 15 onwards he is no longer credited.

== Episodes ==
No. overall	No. in season	Title	Directed by	Written by	Original release date	U.S. viewers (millions)
72	1	"'A' Is for A-l-i-v-e"	I. Marlene King	I. Marlene King	June 11, 2013	2.97
The contents of the trunk of Wilden's squad car is revealed to be a dead pig. The girls flee the scene, with Mona removing the disk showing footage of Ashley running over Wilden. In an attempt to earn some of their trust, Mona reveals a bunch of secrets to the PLLs. The next morning, the girls find Wilden's body lain in the street by the church surrounded by coroners. It is revealed that Wilden was one of two people who wore the Queen of Hearts costume on the Halloween train. Mona says the other was Melissa but the computer is hacked and wiped before she can prove it. Mona is now "A"'s target along with the rest of the Liars. Jessica DiLaurentis returns to Rosewood, but her intentions are unclear. Toby receives a text from "A" asking for the "A" van in exchange for information about his mother's death. "A" plants Ashley's cell phone in Wilden's casket, which Spencer and Mona retrieve based on a tip from "A." At Wilden's funeral, the PLLs meet Detective Gabriel Holbrook who is investigating the murders of Detective Wilden and Garrett Reynolds. A mysterious woman dressed in a black veil appears at Wilden's funeral. 'A' ending: The Black Widow is in the "A" lair. She adds a Mona doll to the collection. As she lifts up her veil, we see that she is wearing a burned Alison mask, revealing that she is Red Coat with a new costume.
73	2	"Turn of the Shoe"	Joanna Kerns	Oliver Goldstick	June 18, 2013	2.92
When Mona takes the other PLLs to the "A" van, it is missing. As Mona returns to her car, she is nearly choked to death by a masked figure dressed in black. When Aria and Emily come to her rescue, the masked figure turns around and nearly runs over the three girls. Emily falls and hits her shoulder on a rock. Hanna is suspicious of Ashley's trip to New York when she finds high heels soiled in mud under the sink. Mona learns that the police have found high-heeled prints at the scene of Wilden's murder, making Hanna suspicious of Ashley's whereabouts. Aria takes a private martial arts lesson where she kisses her instructor, Jake. Jessica gives Alison's parrot, Tippy, to Hanna. Spencer discovers that Tippy is reciting a phone number. The girls try to call it, resulting in a dead end. Returning to Tippy for more clues, the girls find that Tippy has been stolen. Shana warns Emily that she is gunning for the last spot at Stanford also. Emily self-medicates on painkillers, causing her to smash her head on the side of the pool in an important swim meet. Toby tells Spencer he returned the "A" van back to "A" in exchange for medical documents outlining his mother's status on the night of her alleged suicide. 'A' ending: 'A' feeds dinner to a caged Tippy as Tippy continues to speak in Alison's voice.
74	3	"Cat's Cradle"	Norman Buckley	Joseph Dougherty	June 25, 2013	2.25
Everyone has become a suspect, as Hanna discovers a board filled with pictures, notes and connecting lines at the Rosewood PD. Melissa returns to Rosewood and appears to know more than she's letting on. When the girls find a strange mask with an address printed on the inside in Ali's belongings, they seek out the mask maker, Hector Lime, who tells them that he made masks for Ali and her friends. Hanna steals one of Hector's masks when she sees who it was modeled after: Melissa. Ella contemplates going to Europe with her boyfriend, Zack. Aria pushes her to do so after Emily texts her, implying that "A" is targeting Emily's parents. Hanna continues to pry into Ashley's whereabouts at the time of Wilden's murder causing more tension between the two. Caleb reconciles with Jamie and, on suspicion of Ashley's devious actions, hunts down Tom Marin and asks him to look out for Hanna if Ashley is convicted. Spencer and Toby discover a clue at Radley that suggests his mother may not have committed suicide but been murdered. Aria and Jake bond over popcorn and a movie. 'A' ending: 'A' looks at Emily's x-ray of her shoulder.
75	4	"Face Time"	Norman Buckley	Joseph Dougherty	July 2, 2013	2.16
Hanna, Ashley and Caleb meet Lieutenant Linda Tanner, Detective Holbrook's partner. Due to the investigation of Wilden's safety deposit box, the bank forbade Ashley from accessing the vault. Hanna and Caleb remain suspicious of whether Ashley is guilty of a crime. Emily revisits Dr. Vargas who informs her that he was the one that called Family Services, and that the MRI shows that Emily has a tear in her rotator cuff. Toby visits Dr. Palmer who discusses his mother's suicide, he refers to his mother being a victim of the air being too heavy. As Toby leaves Dr. Palmer asks him to tell his mother to keep away from the blonde girl, probably referring to Alison. Aria has an awkward encounter with Malcolm, which causes a temporary riff in her and Jake's relationship. Spencer admits to her mother and Melissa that she did not get into UPenn. Spencer and Aria follow Melissa to Hector Lime's shop where Spencer corners Melissa and demands answers. Melissa explains that Wilden set the fire at the Lodge at Thornhill and that she sent Jenna and Shana to watch over Spencer and her friends. Furthermore, Melissa confesses that she was the second Queen of Hearts on the Halloween Train, but did not know Wilden's plan to assassinate Spencer and Aria until she was on the train. "A" texts Aria and Spencer saying that Melissa is not "A" material. 'A' ending: 'A' holds a broken mask of Melissa as 'A' glues the broken pieces together.
76	5	"Gamma Zeta Die!"	Mick Garris	Maya Goldsmith	July 9, 2013	2.30
On a college visit, Spencer discovers a phone line in a room of the Gamma Zeta Chi sorority house that matches the number Tippy was chirping in episode 2. After talking to Mike, Ella has second thoughts about going to Europe with Zack. Aria persuades Byron to talk to Ella after "A" attacks Ella by "planting" a swarm of bees, in her car. College recruiter Brendan McGowen hits on Emily at the sorority party. Emily explains that she is a lesbian, and not interested. Hanna discovers a gun in Ashley's closet. Hanna rushes to find Spencer at the sorority party. Distracted by the clues about the phone line, Spencer leaves Hanna alone at the party. Hanna ventures behind the sorority house into the back woods and tries to bury the gun but the police show up to arrest her before she can discard it. 'A' ending: 'A' drinks a cup of tea while looking at a picture of Carla Grunwald, the house mother of the sorority.
77	6	"Under the Gun"	Wendey Stanzler	Lijah J. Barasz	July 16, 2013	2.35
The police test the gun Hanna was caught with to determine if it was a match for the gun that killed Wilden. Shana replaces Emily on the swim team. Mike's friend, Connor, kisses Aria after she helps him with an English paper. When rumors fly, Aria confronts Connor who reveals that everyone knows about her and Ezra. Ezra comes to her rescue and silences Connor. Mona reveals to Aria and Emily that Toby took the RV to "A" and that Spencer knew about it. Clues from the sorority house send Spencer and Toby to Ravenswood where they find the ex-house mother Mrs. Grunwald who provides no help. Additionally, they spot Shana in Ravenswood getting into Jenna's car. When the gun tests positive as a match for the one that killed Wilden, the police arrest Ashley. The police also bring Emily in for questioning when a mysterious video showing someone in a red coat wearing an Emily mask reveals that Emily may be guilty of something. 'A' ending: 'A' hot-wires a car while wearing an Emily mask.
78	7	"Crash and Burn, Girl!"	Ron Lagomarsino	Bryan M. Holdman	July 23, 2013	2.86
Toby and Caleb team up to track down possible suspects. Spencer tells Hanna that Ashley could get charged with voluntary manslaughter or worse, first degree murder. Emily steals a key to Wilden's apartment from the Rosewood PD and searches it with the help of Spencer and Aria. Toby and Caleb learn from Nigel Wright that he was paid to create a fake flightplan for CeCe Drake. Mike is accused of vandalizing Connor's car but Ezra talks to Hackett so that Mike won't be expelled. Caleb steals Nigel's phone and tries to find more information. The girls learn from a box in Wilden's apartment that he was also targeted by "A." Pam is suspended from work when the key to Wilden's apartment is missing. That night 'A' crashes a car into the living room of the Fields' house, attempting to kill Pam. 'A' ending: 'A' is in a hardware store buying house fixing supplies addressed to Emily Fields.
79	8	"The Guilty Girl's Handbook"	Janice Cooke	Jan Oxenberg	July 30, 2013	2.31
After Ashley Marin is denied bail, Hanna seeks Mona's help in plotting her biggest lie ever: a false confession to murdering Detective Wilden. Aria learns that Mike is taking martial arts classes from Jake, as he is afraid of his teammates. Spencer finds a statement from Eddie Lamb regarding Mrs Cavanaugh's alleged suicide. She discovers discrepancies between his statement and Wilden's official report, suggesting that Wilden was paid to alter the facts. Veronica later receives a call saying Mona Vanderwaal has confessed to killing Detective Wilden. 'A' ending: 'A' is seen drilling holes in the floor of the DiLaurentis house.
80	9	"Into the Deep"	Chad Lowe	Jonell Lennon	August 6, 2013	2.65
Mona's confession creates enough doubt to allow Ashley to be released on bail. The bail is very high, but in the end Pastor Ted pays it. Ashley must remain under house arrest, though. Mona is released from jail due to insufficient evidence to back up her confession. She ends up being placed back at the Radley Sanitarium. Aria and Jake take their relationship to the next level. Emily finds Jenna nearly drowned in the lake at Emily's birthday party. At the hospital, Shana reveals to Spencer that the person Jenna is afraid of is CeCe Drake. Red Coat is seen walking towards the DiLaurentis House at night. She waits until the lights go off in the house and goes under the porch and unscrews a panel, leading to a secret place. 'A' ending: 'A' plays the piano and placing the sheet of music in an envelope with the name "Toby Cavanaugh" written on it.
81	10	"The Mirror Has Three Faces"	Zetna Fuentes	Maya Goldsmith	August 13, 2013	2.39
Mrs. DiLaurentis offers Emily and her mother to stay with her until their house is repaired. When Ezra prepares to take legal actions to stop Maggie from leaving with Malcolm, he finds out that he is not really his son. It is implied that Wren knows about Red Coat, and Mona knows a secret about him which is the reason she no longer trusts him. Spencer and Toby visit Dr. Palmer, and although they are unable to get details about the "blonde girl" he mentioned, he does mention knowing a Mrs. DiLaurentis. Aria finds out that Cece got kicked out of college due to Alison blaming her for pushing the girl down the stairs at the frat party Ali took the Liars to. When Hanna goes into Alison's old room, Red Coat is seen entering Alison's house. Hanna goes in there, and sees Alison's old jewelry box. In the reflection of the mirror inside the box, you see Red Coat wearing the "Alison" Mask staring at Hanna, but she doesn't notice. Spencer and Hanna ask Mrs. DiLaurentis if she knew Dr. Palmer, and a flashback is shown of the related event. Alison playing the piano, when her mom storms in furiously and berates Alison for something. Jessica says she got a call from Radley, claiming that Alison wanted to admit herself. When Mrs. DiLaurentis got there, it was CeCe dressed in Alison's clothes. Alison asserts that she was not in on CeCe's plan, but Jessica just says that CeCe is no longer welcome in her house since the doctor she spoke to in Radley (Dr. Palmer) said Ali and CeCe's relationship is toxic. Following an observation from workers fixing the heating system, Mrs. DiLaurentis and Emily find Red Coat's hiding place-her basement crawl space. Emily discovers holes in the ceiling, meaning Red Coat was spying on her. 'A' ending: "A" takes Ashley's muddy shoe and throws it in the pile of Emily's collapsed house.
82	11	"Bring Down the Hoe"	Melanie Mayron	Oliver Goldstick & Francesca Rollins	August 20, 2013	2.26
Now that the police found one of Ashley's shoes, courtesy of "A", in Emily's wrecked house, Ashley is looking guilty again. At school Hanna finds an envelope with thousands of dollars in her locker, with a note that says it can help her mom. Later Hanna finds out that it was sent by a guy named Travis, who tells Hanna he knows her mother didn't murder Wilden. He says he saw her at the lake with Wilden after his dad towed Wilden's car from the lake, but heard the gunshots after she drove away. He saw a blonde female run away into the woods. After Hanna encourages him to, he tells the police. Emily remembers Alison told her that she broke up with people's boyfriends for them, and once had a gun pulled on her as a result. Meanwhile CeCe is shown in her apartment, which is plastered with pictures of the girls, including Alison. A red trench coat is seen sitting on her chair. At the school Western-themed hoedown, Emily and Spencer catch a glimpse of Red Coat. They follow her outside and when they get in a tractor they discover red coat is in the haystack in the back. They try to attack her, but strangely all they find is her coat. Toby and Spencer get into a fight after Spencer reveals that she told the girls about Toby's mother. "A" texts him Dr. Palmer's address, and then calls the police just as Toby attempts to break into his car. However, Spencer told Caleb to follow Toby, and Caleb tries to talk sense into Toby before they both narrowly evade the police. Aria visits Ezra's apartment and he talks to her about his issues. "A" is seen eavesdropping on their conversation, and when the person turns around it's CeCe Drake. 'A' ending: 'A' makes voodoo dolls of the five liars: Aria, Spencer, Hanna, Emily, and the newest one, Mona. 'A' takes the knitting utensil and stabs the Mona doll.
83	12	"Now You See Me, Now You Don't"	Norman Buckley	I. Marlene King & Bryan M. Holdman	August 27, 2013	3.33
The Liars receive a package containing four Magic 8-balls bearing their names, with a message that if Ashley goes free, "A" will come after them. Ashley goes free from jail after Travis convinced the police she didn't do it. Meanwhile, Aria gets closer with Ezra after a meeting. The Liars receive another package containing a child-sized coffin which contains a doll resembling Mona, followed by a text that "A" will hurt Mona and set the Liars up. The Liars later receive one last package, containing a saw with a threatening message written on it, saying a girl will disappear. After some quick research, the girls decide that A is leading them to a magic show in nearby Ravenswood. When they arrive, Aria is chosen to be a volunteer for a magic trick. When Hanna and Spencer are distracted by this trick, A kidnaps Emily. The Liars follow Red Coat and discover that Emily is trapped in a coffin that is heading straight for a giant saw. While the Liars seem to be unable to open the coffin in time, Red Coat stops the saw and saves Emily. The girls then notice that there are two Red Coats. Spencer chases the one that saved Emily outside, while Aria gets into fisticuffs with the other who is wearing an Alison mask. Aria hits Red Coat in the face, knocking off her mask and revealing CeCe Drake. CeCe gets knocked off from the platform, where CeCe and Aria have been fighting on. She lies motionless, presumably dead, but when the Liars reach the spot where she fell, she has disappeared. Spencer leads the girls to a lair she believes is "A's", where she had been led by the second Red Coat. She believes it was Alison, because she is helping the girls. Toby finds out Melissa brought Wren with her to London. He follows Shana, while she meets Mona at a hotel and delivers some information. The girls do some digging, and find evidence that suggest that the owner of the lair is a man. When the girls find out that the lair owner, whom they still believe is "A", has also been following Ali, and thinks she will be at a Ravenswood Celebration taking place that night, the Liars decide that they should go find her before "A" does. On their way, the Liars are stopped by Mrs. Grunwald who reveals that Ali is alive, and Mrs. Grunwald saved her life. Someone was after Ali, and Ali was phoning Mrs. Grunwald, asking her to help her find out who it was. On the night Ali 'died', Mrs. Grunwald had sensed Ali was in trouble and rescued her by pulling her up out of the soil where she had been buried alive. Ali was injured and in shock, so Mrs. Grunwald brought her to the hospital, where Ali disappeared when Grunwald went inside. Grunwald tells the Liars to get out of Ravenswood as soon as possible because "he" is watching them and he hopes that the Liars will bring him to Alison. Caleb gets on the bus for Ravenswood to hack into the computers in A's lair, and the Liars decide that they should go to the memorial party no matter what. A man is shown watching the girls, and he walks into the lair exposing his identity: Ezra Fitz. 'A' ending: "A" dresses up as a World War I era soldier as creepy music plays.
84	13	"Grave New World"	Ron Lagomarsino	Joseph Dougherty & Oliver Goldstick & I. Marlene King	October 22, 2013	3.18
Aria, Emily, Hanna, and Spencer crash the Ravenswood Founders Day Celebration following the revelation that Alison could be alive. Ezra is also there and is seen dressed in a World War I era soldiers uniform. The girls see Red Coat and attempt to follow her but she escapes before they can get to her. Caleb arrives in Ravenswood and meets Miranda and they bond. Hanna becomes separated from the rest of the Liars and finds herself trapped in a phone booth where she sees Alison through the glass before she is attacked by "A". Spencer is also attacked in a greenhouse by Ezra, who is dressed in his World War I uniform, where she cuts his hand. Mrs. Grunwald tells the girls that one of them has been touched by the one Alison fears the most. This would suggest that Beach Hottie, aka Board Shorts, attacked Spencer and Alison. Caleb decides to stay in Ravenswood after he finds his and Miranda's names and photos on graves. Spencer's tires are slashed and Ezra suspiciously picks the Liars up. Once back in Rosewood, the Liars see Red Coat again and follow her to Spencer's back yard where she takes off her hood. It's Alison, alive and well. She tells them she still can't come back to Rosewood because it's not safe. Ezra turns up with Aria's phone and when they turn back around Alison has gone. The Liars are perplexed by Alison's disappearance yet again. This episode also serves as a backdoor pilot of the series’s spinoff Ravenswood.
85	14	"Who's in the Box?"	Chad Lowe	Joseph Dougherty	January 7, 2014	3.17
The Liars are more shocked now that Alison is officially alive and they are looking for answers. Hanna brings a theory that if Alison is not in the grave then another girl is, so she starts searching for missing girls the same day Ali disappeared. Toby returns and looks for Spencer's help so he could prove that his mother didn't jump from the window by herself. Mona has a meeting with Ezra. Caleb returns to meet Hanna and has a difficult time revealing to her what happened during his stay in Ravenswood. Hanna finds about a girl named Sara Harvey, who disappeared at the same time Alison did so she and Emily meet Sara's friends — Claire (Skyler Day) and Tina. Aria and Ezra reconcile their relationship and meet in Ezra's cabin which is away from the town. Ashley is having trouble finding a job, but later Jessica DiLaurentis offers her a job. When Spencer and Toby tell Spencer's father about the information they found about his mother, he reveals that they can possibly close Radley. During their meeting at Alison's grave, Hanna gives Ali's journal to Aria, Emily and Spencer. 'A' ending: 'A' is opening a secret basement in Ezra's cabin.
86	15	"Love ShAck, Baby"	Norman Buckley	Lijah J. Barasz	January 14, 2014	2.39
Aria, Emily, Hanna and Spencer decide to use Ali's journal in order to get her to come back and fix things to normal. They realize that Ali used pseudonyms and half-truths and in order to find who is who, they all get a taste of if. Emily learns that Ali hurt her most and she later receives a note to meet her at the Kissing Rock, however Ali never shows up. Hanna meets Travis who tells her that CeCe has been seen in a train station in Maryland. Spencer on the other hand has her own issues with her father who she accidentally sees talking with Jessica DiLaurentis. When the Liars decide to go to Killingworth, Emily's car has some issues so they are forced to stay in Ezra's cabin, with Aria instructing them. When they all go at the cabin, Ezra is able to go there first and steal the journal. Travis comes to help them after Hanna asked him. 'A' ending: 'A' hacks into a GPS System, hinting that it might be 'A' who messed with Emily's GPS car settings.
87	16	"Close Encounters"	Arthur Anderson	Jonell Lennon	January 21, 2014	2.63
Peter tells Spencer that he and Jessica have been trying to get Jason back into rehab. Aria ends her relationship with Jake. Later, Jake becomes suspicious of Ezra when he sees Ezra screaming at some woman in a car. Shana finds Emily and tells her Ali wants to meet up with her - alone. Shana reveals that she grew up in the house next door to Alison's grandparents in Georgia and that she has known Alison since age 3. Shana also confesses that Ali asked her to come to Rosewood to find out who is trying to hurt Ali - and that Jenna is on the list. Spencer learns that Jessica was on the Board of Trustees at Radley at the time of Mrs. Cavanaugh's death. Spencer tells Toby, but he and his dad have decided to let it go and have accepted a settlement from Radley. Hanna continues to struggle with her feelings about her break-up with Caleb and winds up kissing Travis in the heat of the moment. Shana takes Emily to Ali's meeting place where Ali tells Emily she doesn't know who's trying to hurt her. Spencer follows Emily there and scares Ali away, causing tension between Spencer and Emily. Jake injures his foot by kicking his lucky punching bag only to find someone had sabotaged it by placing knives inside. 'A' ending: "A" slices a picture of (presumably) Ali and Shana when they were younger in half and symbolically lights the half with Shana's face on fire.
88	17	"Bite Your Tongue"	Arlene Sanford	Oliver Goldstick & Maya Goldsmith	January 28, 2014	2.49
Tensions rise when Aria confronts Mike and Mona individually about their new relationship. Detective Holbrook apologizes to Hanna for making her and Ashley appear as criminals in the Wilden investigation. Spencer turns to Andrew for prescription medication to help her avoid sleep to focus all her time on finding "A". Wayne asks Ezra to help Emily after she nearly stabbed him with scissors the night before. Concerned for her brother's safety, Aria questions new guidance counselor, Jesse, about Mike and Mona's new relationship. From one of Ali's diary entries, Spencer determines that "Board Shorts" ordered boysenberry pie and beer with Ali at a pub near Hollis College. She becomes wary of Ezra when she goes to the pub and encounters him there - with an order of boysenberry pie and beer. Hanna goes to the dentist to find patient sign in documents from around the time that Alison disappeared in the hope of finding out who is in Alison's grave. "A" traps Emily in the Copy Room at school. She is rescued by Wayne. Then, he is rescued by the paramedics due to a heart condition. Around the same time that evening, "A" gases Hanna with anesthesia at the dentist and leaves behind a message in one of her teeth, "I told you. Dead girls can't smile. Stop looking. -A" 'A' ending: A' shreds the patient sign in documents from the dentist and uses the shredded paper to line Tippi's cage.
89	18	"Hot for Teacher"	Tripp Reed	Bryan M. Holdman	February 4, 2014	2.16
Spencer buys prescription pills from another student. Hanna and Spencer argue about Spencer's lying and strange behavior. Shana asks Emily for help. Emily discovers Ali's secret stash of cash hidden in the back of a French painting in Ali's bedroom. Aria lies to her friends and spends the weekend with Ezra at his cabin. In the basement, Ezra uses surveillance equipment to monitor every action of the Liars. When Shana is en route to collect Ali's money from Emily, she is attacked by an unseen assailant. Hanna warns Spencer before breaking into Ezra's apartment. Spencer heeds the warning when she spots the red dot of a camera light in the air duct. Hanna and Spencer share info with Emily and the three decide to keep their Ezra-as-"A" theory a secret from Aria until they're absolutely sure. Ali calls Shana to ask her about the money but Shana doesn't have it. Shana's car is now parked in front of the "Welcome to Rosewood" sign, which contains a threatening message. Shana hightails it out of Rosewood leaving Ali high and dry. 'A' ending: "A" empties an envelope containing prescription pads with Wren's name and credentials.
90	19	"Shadow Play"	Joseph Dougherty	Joseph Dougherty	February 11, 2014	2.16
Spencer, Emily and Hanna search Ezra's classroom and find Ali's diary. Spencer takes it home with her. Meanwhile, Aria and Ezra spend time together. Tired from staying awake thanks to her prescription pills, Spencer falls into a state of trance. Spencer's thoughts become transformed into a black-and-white 1940s film noir era. Imaginary moments include Toby accusing Spencer of keeping secrets, Alison accusing Spencer of becoming dependent on the pills, and Ezra whispering to Aria that he knows Alison is still alive. Of course, none of this is real. Just before Spencer snaps out of it, Toby tells her to look at the pages in Ali's diary. When she comes to, she goes back to Ali's diary and scans the pages using her mental revelation of Toby's insight. Spencer returns to Emily and Hanna with the diary and tells them that seemingly minor but important details have been altered. The girls realize that they were meant to find the diary and since it has been altered, Ezra knows that they know. They decide it is time to warn Aria, but when they find her, they are surprised to see that she is happy and kissing Ezra at her house. 'A' ending: A message from 'A' is shown in the dressing room in Spencer's dream.
91	20	"Free Fall"	Melanie Mayron	Maya Goldsmith	February 18, 2014	2.56
Ezra tells Aria about Spencer's addiction. Spencer, Emily and Hanna plan to tell Aria that Ezra is "A." Aria shows Emily and Hanna the file Ezra gave her in secret about Spencer's previous addiction two years ago. They stage an intervention, but it does not go well and Spencer blurts out that Ezra is "A" to Aria. Mike and Mona grow closer and Mona distances herself from Ezra, telling him she can't help him anymore. Feeling uncertain, Aria digs for answers at Ezra's cabin and finds notes about his relationship with Alison. She assumes the worst and tries to run away, but Ezra catches up to her and traps her in a ski lift at a nearby lodge. Spencer, Emily and Hanna set a trap for "A" to retrieve the money for Alison that Emily placed in a coffee bag for Shana to take to Ali. But "A" sets a trap for them, too, locking them in the reptile pavilion at a zoo in Norristown. Ezra confesses the truth to Aria - that he knew about her and how old she was before he started teaching at Rosewood High, that he knew Alison before she disappeared, and that he's been watching her and her friends as research for a book about Ali. But Aria doesn't believe him and thinks their whole relationship has been a ruse. Ezra knocks the pages of his novel about Ali from Aria's hand. They fall to the ground several feet below. 'A' ending: 'A' collects the pages of the book.
92	21	"She's Come Undone"	Chad Lowe	Jonell Lennon	February 25, 2014	2.17
Aria reveals to her friends that Ezra suspects one of them is "A." Spencer promises her parents and Toby that she will kick the pill habit on her own. Aria ransacks Ezra's apartment after finding more of his notes with her name all over them. Her friends find her and take her home - but not before Spencer collects some pages of Ezra's writing before they leave. Emily goes to deliver Ali's money to a P.O. Box per Shana's request but is cornered by Paige. Emily reveals to Paige that Ali is still alive. Paige and Emily give each other ultimatums: to refrain from communication with Ali or end their relationship and for Paige to not let any harm come to Ali. When Hanna apologizes to Travis for kissing him, he tells her that his dad is in court, accused of taking bribes from Wilden in exchange for business leads. After Detective Holbrook testifies, the judge grants probation to Travis's dad. Hanna thanks Holbrook with a short, awkward kiss. "A" places a bottle of pills in Spencer's locker. She takes them after searching Ezra's notes and suspecting her father hired a P.I. to follow her. Spencer interrogates Mrs. DiLaurentis about the night of Ali's disappearance but Mrs. DiLaurentis kicks her out for her erratic behavior. Hanna prevents Aria from telling Hackett about her relationship with Ezra. Paige surreptitiously drops a note stating that Alison is alive into a police car. 'A' ending: "A" reads Ezra's story by a fireplace.
93	22	"Cover for Me"	Michael Grossman	Bryan M. Holdman	March 4, 2014	2.06
Aria hooks up with a musician named Riley in Syracuse. Spencer is monitored by a tough rehab coach named Dean. Holbrook and Tanner ask Hanna about a note stating Alison is alive. Hanna honestly tells them she's clueless. Emily discovers Mona helped Ezra with his book in exchange that he keeps Mona's "less-than-legal" activities under wraps and Mona broke up with Mike to avoid her past resurfacing. Spencer is shaken when she finds a pile of dirt at the edge of her bed and an "A" note accusing her of digging Ali's grave. Aria returns and demands Ezra leave Rosewood but he insists she read his manuscript. Spencer has another hazy memory of the shovel and Ali running through the woods. Hanna spots Holbrook and Tanner pull Mrs. DiLaurentis aside while on a date with Travis. Later, the friends gather when Aria determines from Ezra's manuscript that he suspects Mrs. DiLaurentis is "A." Hanna realizes Emily told Paige that Alison is alive. As Spencer is about to go to bed, we see Mrs. DiLaurentis creeping around her room, unbeknownst to her. 'A' ending: "A" cuts a loose string on a wedding dress.
94	23	"Unbridled"	Oliver Goldstick	Oliver Goldstick & Maya Goldsmith	March 11, 2014	1.95
Holbrook approaches an unnerved Jessica with a judge's order for Ali's grave to be exhumed. Spencer questions Veronica about her hazy memories of the night Ali disappeared. Ella returns to visit Aria, still reeling from her break-up with Ezra. Aria fails to open up to her. Emily confronts Paige for telling the police that Ali is alive. Later, Emily forgives Paige but isn't sure if she can trust her again and tells her goodbye. Emily also confronts Jason, recently released from rehab, who tells her that Jessica had suspicions about Spencer prior to the night Ali disappeared. Hanna tries get a second date with Travis, but he remains hesitant. Veronica fires Dean when he appears to be "slacking" on the job - he fell asleep on top of Spencer at the edge of the couch. Ella confides in Aria that Zack proposed - in two different languages. Ashley tells Hanna about Jessica's recent purchases. More suspicious than ever, Hanna volunteers the girls for Jessica's charity bridal fashion show. Hanna and Emily search Alison's room to find them. Instead, they discover the password to the e-mail address on the post-it attached to Alison's money and contact her. Alison calls, telling them to meet her in Philadelphia. Spencer catches Jessica talking to someone and chases the unseen person through the woods. Spencer retreats after getting her veil caught in a bear-claw trap and losing track of the mystery person. She returns hysterical and removes her bodice, finding finger bones sewn into the lining and a note from "A". The girls go to Philadelphia to meet Alison but are surprised by the person who actually shows up. 'A' ending: "A" calls the Rosewood Police Department presumably to turn in CeCe Drake, after finding her name in a registration book at a hotel.
95	24	"'A' Is for Answers"	I. Marlene King	I. Marlene King	March 18, 2014	3.12
Noel Kahn brings Aria, Emily, Hanna and Spencer to Ali's loft apartment above a coffee shop/bar. Ali appears and recounts the night of her disappearance from her perspective.She reveals that she copied Ian's videos from his laptop onto a USB stick during their weekend getaway in Hilton Head, Ali met Ezra in a bar near UPenn and convinced him that she and CeCe were college roommates, Ali used the N.A.T. Videos as a bargaining chip to blackmail Ian, and that one-by-one, Ali confronted all of her "A" suspects throughout the night. Ali confessed that she drugged the girls by dropping sleeping pills into the communal drinking cup in the barn - Spencer didn't fall asleep with the others because she was on amphetamines. Ali also explained that she went home thinking she had silenced "A" and saw her mother gasp from inside the house before she was hit on the head with a rock. Ali awoke to find her mother burying her. Melissa returns from London to find her home being searched by police. Rosewood PD interrogates the Hastings family while searching for the whereabouts of the girls, still missing since the fundraiser. Melissa confesses to Peter that Spencer did not kill the girl buried in lieu of Ali and whispers something mysterious to him. The police track the GPS of Spencer's car but do not find them in the dusty space in Philadelphia. Someone in a black hoodie like "A" attacks the Liars in the coffee shop. They run to the rooftop to escape. To their surprise, Ezra joins them. Ezra fights the hooded figure and gets shot in the stomach. Hanna is able to gain control of black hoodie's gun but they escape by jumping to the next building and does not take off the mask. The Liars are frantic when they discover Ezra's bullet wound, and it is revealed that the Liars are in Manhattan; not Philadelphia. 'A' ending: Jessica's dead body is dragged across the grass as "A" buries her.

== Specials ==
Special no.	Title	Narrator(s)	Aired between	Original air date	U.S viewers (million)
1	"A Liars Guide to Rosewood"	Janel Parrish as Mona Vanderwaal	"A Dangerous Game" "'A' Is for A-l-i-v-e"	June 4, 2013	1.13
A special recap encompassing all three previous seasons of the series told by Janel Parrish as Mona Vanderwaal. It tells the Liars' history with "A" from the very first text message to the most recent spotting of Red Coat in the season three finale.

== Reception ==
The fourth season garnered positive reviews from critics. It earned a 100% approval rating on Rotten Tomatoes, with an average rating of 7.1 out of 10. Mark Trammell of TV Equals commented on "how savvy the show was this time around." Caroline Framke of The A.V. Club commented on how the show's focus on shocking moments are more appealing than big picture, writing "It might have been fun at one point, but trying to keep track of who's in or out with A is an exhausting exercise that rarely yields satisfying results anymore". Framke commented further "But the thing about Pretty Little Liars is that when it's good, it is a fever dream. It's at its most fun when it breezes past the big picture, gets lost in its own illusions, and lets a talking parrot steal the spotlight."

== Ratings ==
=== Live + SD ratings ===
No. in series	No. in season	Episode	Air date	Time slot (EST)	Rating/Share (18–49)	Viewers (m)	Rank (18-49)
72	1	"'A' Is forfor A-l-i-v-e"	June 11, 2013	Tuesdays; 8:00 p.m.	1.3	2.97	1
73	2	"Turn of the Shoe"	June 18, 2013	Tuesdays; 8:00 p.m.	1.3	2.92	1
74	3	"Cat's Cradle"	June 25, 2013	Tuesdays; 8:00 p.m.	0.9	2.25	13
75	4	"Face Time"	July 2, 2013	Tuesdays; 8:00 p.m.	0.9	2.16	19
76	5	"Gamma Zeta Die!"	July 9, 2013	Tuesdays; 8:00 p.m.	1.0	2.30	10
77	6	"Under the Gun"	July 16, 2013	Tuesdays; 8:00 p.m.	1.0	2.35	9
78	7	"Crash and Burn, Girl!"	July 23, 2013	Tuesdays; 8:00 p.m.	1.3	2.86	2
79	8	"The Guilty Girl's Handbook"	July 30, 2013	Tuesdays; 8:00 p.m.	1.1	2.31	6
80	9	"Into the Deep"	August 6, 2013	Tuesdays; 8:00 p.m.	1.1	2.65	10
81	10	"The Mirror Has Three Faces"	August 13, 2013	Tuesdays; 8:00 p.m.	1.0	2.39	8
82	11	"Bring Down the Hoe"	August 20, 2013	Tuesdays; 8:00 p.m.	0.9	2.26	18
83	12	"Now You See Me, Now You Don't"	August 27, 2013	Tuesdays; 8:00 p.m.	1.4	3.33	3
84	13	"Grave New World"	October 22, 2013	Tuesdays; 8:00 p.m.	1.4	3.18	2
85	14	"Who's in the Box?"	January 7, 2014	Tuesdays; 8:00 p.m.	1.2	3.17	8
86	15	"Love ShAck, Baby"	January 14, 2014	Tuesdays; 8:00 p.m.	1.1	2.39	7
87	16	"Close Encounters"	January 21, 2014	Tuesdays; 8:00 p.m.	1.2	2.63	7
88	17	"Bite Your Tongue"	January 28, 2014	Tuesdays; 8:00 p.m.	1.0	2.49	9
89	18	"Hot for Teacher"	February 4, 2014	Tuesdays; 8:00 p.m.	0.9	2.16	14
90	19	"Shadow Play"	February 11, 2014	Tuesdays; 8:00 p.m.	0.9	2.16	12
91	20	"Free Fall"	February 18, 2014	Tuesdays; 8:00 p.m.	1.0	2.56	9
92	21	"She's Come Undone"	February 25, 2014	Tuesdays; 8:00 p.m.	1.0	2.17	7
93	22	"Cover for Me"	March 4, 2014	Tuesdays; 8:00 p.m.	0.8	2.06	17
94	23	"Unbridled"	March 11, 2014	Tuesdays; 8:00 p.m.	0.8	1.95	13
95	24	"'A' Is for Answers"	March 18, 2014	Tuesdays; 8:00 p.m.	1.3	3.12	2

== DVD release ==
The Complete Fourth Season
Set details			Special features
24 episodes; 1094 minutes (Region 1); 1012 minutes (Region 2); 1013 minutes (Region 4); 5-disc set; 1.85:1 aspect ratio; Languages: English (Dolby Digital 2.0 Surround); Subtitles: English, Spanish and French (Region 1); English, Spanish, Danish, French, Arabic, Dutch, Norwegian, Swedish, English for the Hearing Impaired (Regions 2 and 4)			Deleted scenes: Episodes: 10, 12, 16, 18, 20; Unhooding Red Coat: Alison Is Alive! - What were Alison doing during these two years and what really happened in the night she disappeared?; Confessions of "A" Lair - A tour of the headquarters of 'A'; Pretty Little Scenes - See the set and costumes designs featured on the show; Bonus Recap Episode - Get caught up watching the special A Liars Guide to Rosewood, with the help of Mona's narration
Release dates			Deleted scenes: Episodes: 10, 12, 16, 18, 20; Unhooding Red Coat: Alison Is Alive! - What were Alison doing during these two years and what really happened in the night she disappeared?; Confessions of "A" Lair - A tour of the headquarters of 'A'; Pretty Little Scenes - See the set and costumes designs featured on the show; Bonus Recap Episode - Get caught up watching the special A Liars Guide to Rosewood, with the help of Mona's narration
United States	United Kingdom	Australia	Deleted scenes: Episodes: 10, 12, 16, 18, 20; Unhooding Red Coat: Alison Is Alive! - What were Alison doing during these two years and what really happened in the night she disappeared?; Confessions of "A" Lair - A tour of the headquarters of 'A'; Pretty Little Scenes - See the set and costumes designs featured on the show; Bonus Recap Episode - Get caught up watching the special A Liars Guide to Rosewood, with the help of Mona's narration
June 3, 2014	September 29, 2014	July 9, 2014	Deleted scenes: Episodes: 10, 12, 16, 18, 20; Unhooding Red Coat: Alison Is Alive! - What were Alison doing during these two years and what really happened in the night she disappeared?; Confessions of "A" Lair - A tour of the headquarters of 'A'; Pretty Little Scenes - See the set and costumes designs featured on the show; Bonus Recap Episode - Get caught up watching the special A Liars Guide to Rosewood, with the help of Mona's narration
