= Grave New World (Pretty Little Liars) =

- Pretty Little Liars episode
- Episode no.: Season 4 Episode 13
- Directed by: Ron Lagomarsino
- Written by: Joseph Dougherty; Oliver Goldstick; I. Marlene King
- Cinematography by: Larry Reibman
- Editing by: Lois Blumenthal
- Original air date: October 22, 2013

Guest appearances
- Nicole Gale Anderson as Miranda Collins; Brett Dier as Luke Matheson; Meg Foster as Carla Grunwald; Irwin Keyes as Creepy Passenger; Elizabeth Whitson as Leah; Vince Lasalvia as Raymond Collins

Episode chronology
← Previous "Now You See Me, Now You Don't"	Next → "Who’s in the Box?"
- Pretty Little Liars season 4

"Grave New World" is the 13th episode of the fourth season of the American mystery drama television series Pretty Little Liars. It originally aired on October 22, 2013 on ABC Family and serves as the season's Halloween episode, which aired as part of the 13 Nights of Halloween programming block. The episode was directed by Ron Lagomarsino and written by Joseph Dougherty, Oliver Goldstick and I. Marlene King. The episode also serves as a backdoor pilot to the series’ spinoff Ravenswood, which follows a group of people investigating the supernatural occurrences in the titular town. As a result, the episode features the spinoff's main cast as guest characters and some supernatural elements.

In the episode, Aria, Emily, Hanna and Spencer attend the Ravenswood Founders Day Celebration party at the cemetery in hopes of tracking down Alison, who they believe is still alive and on the run from A. While there, the girls encounter a masked figure following their every move and unexplained supernatural occurrences. Meanwhile, Caleb meets Miranda, a girl in the foster system looking for her uncle, while on the bus to Ravenswood and helps her deal with some issues stemming from her past in the town.

"Grave New World" was watched by 3.18 million viewers and garnered a 1.4 rating, even with the previous episode and up from last year's Halloween episode. The Halloween special set ratings record for the 13 Nights of Halloween programming block and became the seventh episode of the series to amass over 1 million tweets. The episode garnered a lukewarm reception from television critics, who believe it fell flat from the summer finale and the last Halloween special. However, the final moment where Alison reveals herself was considered by most the best part of the episode.

== Plot ==
Aria (Lucy Hale), Emily (Shay Mitchell), Hanna (Ashley Benson) and Spencer (Troian Bellisario) arrive at the Ravenswood Founders Day Celebration party, donning nineteenth-century attire. While at the party, Ezra (Ian Harding) calls Aria to check on her and advises her to be careful. He puts on his mask for his costume and enters the party. The girls spot Luke (Brett Dier) wearing a vintage soldier's costume similar to the one they found in Ezra's apartment. The girls split up to find Alison and examine Luke. Hanna spots two short blond figures in red coats while Emily is separated from Aria by Mrs. Grunwald (Meg Foster), who warns them to go away. Aria finds Leah (Elizabeth Whitson) in a ditch, pulls her out and learns that Luke is Leah's cousin.

While on a bus to Ravenswood, Caleb (Tyler Blackburn) is approached by Miranda (Nicole Gale Anderson) after being frightened by the man (Irwin Keyes) she was sitting next to. Miranda tells Caleb about her past life and how she is going to Ravenswood to meet her uncle. Just as Caleb asks about her uncle, Miranda runs off to get some chips from the old man in the back of the bus. As she reaches into the bag, he awakens from sleep and she runs back to her seat. Caleb apologizes to Miranda about asking about her uncle and tells her his story about his uncle. Miranda tells him about her foster parent and decides to get off at the upcoming stop and go home. As she gets up to leave, she notices the man from the back of the bus and decides to stay.

As the girls, frightened and anxious, reconvene, they spot Red Coat and chase after her. They land in a mausoleum, but find that Red Coat has disappeared. The girls notice a spot in the mausoleum and discover a secret passageway. As they walk in, the door behind them closes without warning. The girls continue trekking through the passageway as gusts of wind begin hitting the girls. When the wind stops, Hanna has gone missing.

Hanna, while trying to find the girls, notices the phrase "HELP ME" written in red on the wall. As she turns on her cellphone light to read the message, she notices a swarm of rats on the ground and runs through a passageway, which leads to a door to a room in a mansion. Unbeknownst to her, a masked Ezra is lurking behind her. Hanna continues walking through the mansion until she finds a telephone booth. She tries to use the telephone, but it turns out to be a gag. Hanna tries to leave but finds herself locked in with three lights closing in on the outside. The lights suddenly disappear and the phone rings with a vintage record playing on the other end.

Caleb and Miranda arrive in Ravenswood and go their separate ways. Miranda walks into the mansion to explore. Meanwhile, Aria, Emily and Spencer find their way into the mansion and notice blood dripping from the ceiling. They suddenly hear Alison's voice and head off to find her, but Spencer gets separated from them. While trapped in the booth, Alison's face appears, but is dragged away and the masked man's image appears in its place. Miranda then frees Hanna from the booth and together they try to find a way out of the mansion. They enter a room filled with coffins, which triggers a painful memory for Miranda. As they leave, Miranda notices a booklet and takes it with her

Aria and Emily find a room with an open window and prepare to leave the house and get help. As they hear Alison's screams, the girls retreat and the window's jagged glass shuts behind them. Meanwhile, Spencer walks into a greenhouse where she discovers the masked man waiting for her. They wrestle before Spencer picks up hedge cutters. She slices the man's hand and knocks him out. She reaches for his mask, but he awakens and grabs her. She breaks free before hitting her head against a wooden ledge. He picks up the hedge cuts and stands over her.

Caleb finds Miranda and Hanna while Aria and Emily find an unconscious Spencer. Hanna shows Caleb and Miranda the door to the passageway, but the door won't open. Meanwhile, Miranda finds a grave marker with her name and image on it. Aria, Emily and Spencer listen to Alison's cries for help and discover a tape recorder with her voice playing. Mrs. Grunwald enters the room and tells the girls that it is her room and the tape was stolen from her office. She later has a psychic feeling, warning "One of you has been touched by the one Alison fears the most." Hanna learns from the girls that Alison is gone.

Aria, Emily and Spencer find the car with a slashed tire. Miranda decides to go back into the house; Hanna sends Caleb off to help Miranda and returns to the girls, who have found the spare tire missing. Ezra pulls up and offers the girls a ride back to Rosewood. When they reach Rosewood, they discover Red Coat watching them and chase her into Spencer's backyard. Red Coat reveals herself as Alison and tells the girls she doesn't have time. She tells them that she wants to come back home but it still isn't safe. She runs away as Ezra approaches Aria with her phone. Back at Ravenswood, Miranda and Caleb discover a grave marker with Caleb's name and image on it.

== Production ==
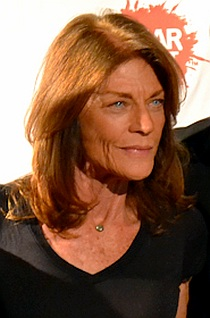
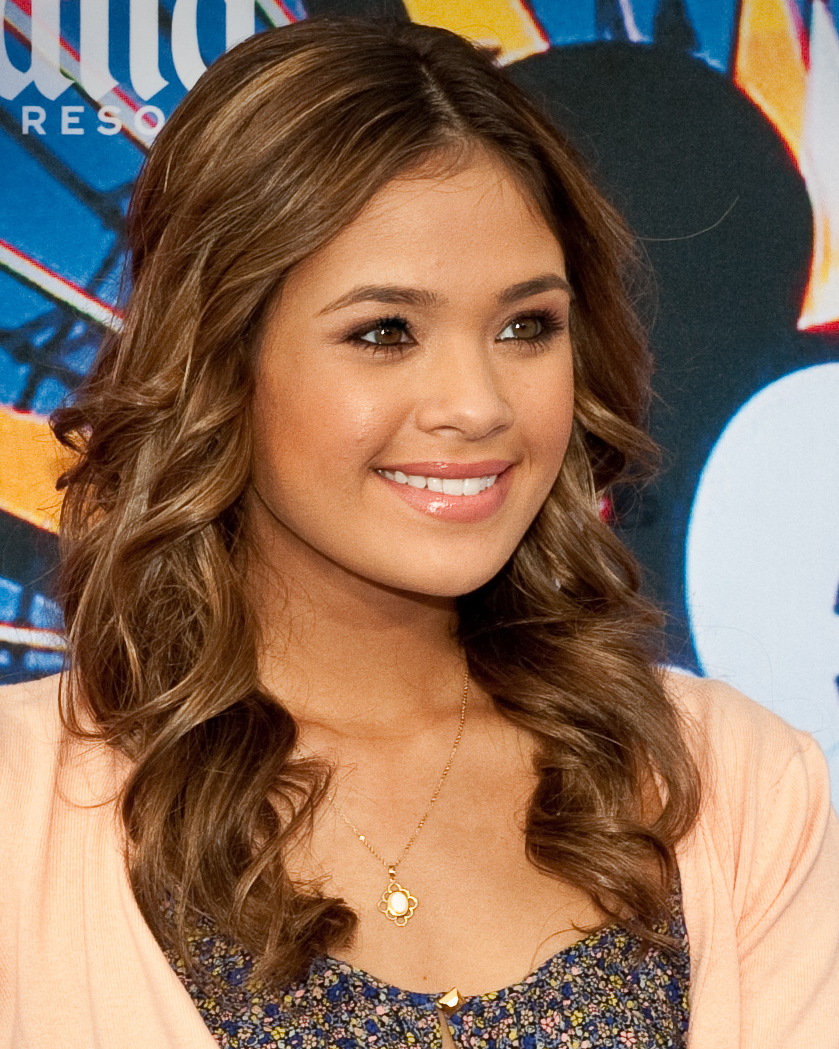
Meg Foster (left) and Nicole Gale Anderson (right) portray Carla Grunwald and Miranda Collins, respectively.

In March 2013, Pretty Little Liars was renewed for a fifth season and green-lighted for a spinoff series, Ravenswood, which would premiere in October of that year. “Grave New World” was directed by Ron Lagomarsino and written by Joseph Dougherty, Oliver Goldstick and I. Marlene King. Filming for the episode took place over a 10-day time span, beginning on May 31, 2013 and concluding on June 10, 2013. The episode was filmed in between filming for the eighth episode, “The Guilty Girl’s Handbook”, and filming for the ninth and tenth episodes of the season, “Into the Deep” and “The Mirror Has Three Faces”.

The episode served as a backdoor pilot for the series’ spinoff Ravenswood, featuring guest appearances from Nicole Gale Anderson as Miranda and Brett Dier as Luke, the main cast of the show. Elizabeth Whitson appears in this episode as a character named Leah, who is apparently Luke's cousin. However, when this episode was shot Whitson was still going to play Olivia, Luke's twin sister. The role was recast with Merritt Patterson for the actual show, after this episode was shot but before the first episode for Ravenswood was shot. The character of Raymond Collins, Miranda's uncle also introduced originally played by Vince Lasalvia. The role was later played by Steven Cabral in Ravenswood.

== Reception ==
=== Ratings ===
"Grave New World" originally aired on October 22, 2013, as part of the 13 Nights of Halloween programming special on ABC Family, and was followed by the series premiere of the Pretty Little Liars' spinoff, Ravenswood. The episode marks the third annual Halloween special from the series, each premiering apart from the regular summer and winter seasons. The Halloween themed episode was viewed by 3.18 million viewers, up 14 percent from the previous Halloween special (2.75 million viewers). It was the third most-watched broadcast in the history of programming block and the second most-watched episode of the season. The episode also acquired a 1.4 ratings share among adults ages 18 – 49, translating to 1.8 million viewers, up 25 percent from the previous year's special and ranks as the top rated broadcast within the 13 Nights of Halloween programming block and the third highest rated episode in the series. "Grave New World" also amassed 1.16 million tweets on Twitter, becoming the seventh episode of the series to garner over 1 million tweets.

=== Reviews ===
Nick Campbell of TV.com expressed a mixed opinion about the episode, writing "We can't really say it was a disappointing outing for the Liars because of the ending, but it was almost a cheap trick to salvage a series full of weak events by pulling the Alison trump card." Lindsay Sperling of We Got This Covered lauded the episode's scenery, saying "The combination of the less intense tones and the ominous music might be a bit much when considered in the context of multiple episodes but I’d say that the new aesthetic choices are a welcome change, and looked more on par with what Pretty Little Liars generally delivers." Caroline Preece of Den of Geek called the episode "average" and opined that the episode "might have been the weakest Halloween special yet. " Elizabeth SanFilippo of Examiner.com gave the episode three out of five stars, writing that "the final moment of the "PLL" special was what made this episode worth watching." The A.V. Club's Caroline Siede gave the episode a C+, finding the “slow and atmospheric” pace of the special unfitting for the series while praised the Liars' costumes, Spencer's in particular. Teresa Lopez of TV Fanatic gave the Halloween-themed episode two and a half stars (out of five), calling it "a disappointing follow-up, spending more time setting up the mysterious new show Ravenswood than advancing the plot of Pretty Little Liars." Lopez further added that the episode fell short of the "great background information coupled with a spooky story" in the season two Halloween special, "First Secret", and the "wild ride with an shocking final surprise" in the previous Halloween special, "This Is a Dark Ride".
