= Driving Miss Crazy =

- Pretty Little Liars episode
- Episode no.: Season 7 Episode 17
- Directed by: Oliver Goldstick
- Written by: Oliver Goldstick &; Francesca Rollins
- Cinematography by: Larry Reibman
- Editing by: Jill D'Agnenica
- Production code: 2M7217
- Original air date: June 6, 2017
- Running time: 42:43

Guest appearances
- Nolan North as Peter Hastings; Lesley Fera as Veronica Hastings; Nicholas Gonzalez as Det. Marco Furey; Max Deacon as Dr. Handlin; Ajgie Kirkland as Park Ranger

Episode chronology
← Previous "The Glove That Rocks the Cradle"	Next → "Choose or Lose"
- Pretty Little Liars (season 7)

"Driving Miss Crazy" is the seventeenth episode of the seventh season of Pretty Little Liars, and the show's 157th episode overall, which premiered on the Freeform network in the United States on June 6, 2017. It was co-written by executive producer Oliver Goldstick and Francesca Rollins, and directed by Goldstick. They had previously worked on the ninth episode of the sixth season.

In this episode, Mona (Janel Parrish) teams up with the Liars to investigate on Alison's pregnancy and on the Liars' Lament board game. Ezra (Ian Harding) and Aria (Lucy Hale) discuss their marriage, while Caleb (Tyler Blackburn) proposes to Hanna (Ashley Benson). Meanwhile, Spencer (Troian Bellisario) reconnects with biological mother Mary (Andrea Parker), creating a feud between Spencer and Mr. Hastings (Nolan North).

== Plot ==
Emily reluctantly teams up with Mona to investigate; Ashley returns to Rosewood to check on Hanna after learning some frightening information and asks Caleb what his intentions are with her daughter; Spencer’s family reels from A.D.’s latest taunt, leaving Spencer more confused than ever about whom to trust.

— "Driving Miss Crazy" synopsis from Freeform website

"A.D." asks Aria to leave a burner phone at the Hastings residence, connecting it to the house's network, and play a recording of a conversation between Peter and Mary, made six years after Jessica's death. It ultimately leads a discussion between Spencer and her parents. Peter defends himself by saying that he would do anything to protect his family, including killing. Spencer is shocked by her father's imprudence, and Veronica relinquishes her Senatorial position. Flashbacks show that Mary visited the Hastings residence when Veronica and her daughters were traveling. She, Peter and Jessica had an argument the same night. Later, Mary takes Spencer to the Lost Woods Resort, where she reveals that Jessica and Peter were plotting against her. Mary then took revenge on the two and used the plan to kill Jessica instead, leaving her body on Peter's yard. Mary asks Spencer if she wants to run away, mother and daughter, but Spencer rejects the offer, saying that she needs to help her friends.

Aria's relationship with Ezra cools off while she continues to blame herself for being a tormentor's assistant. They enroll in dance classes, but Ezra isn't able to understand what's going on with his fiancée. Ezra then begins to think that Aria has not yet forgiven the fact that he had approached her to write a book about Alison, but Aria denies it. "A.D." machinations lead Aria to dream a strange nightmare. In the nightmare, Mona sings a rendition of "Jailhouse Rock", while Ezra is an inmate who is beaten by several other inmates. The black-and-white number ends with Veronica Hastings proffering Ezra and Aria's marriage, with Aria trying to apologize for what she did. As a reward for having obeyed the orders, "A.D." give Aria one piece of the puzzle and some confidential files.

Detective Furey visits Hanna on her apartment the day after the Radley's flood. He indirectly accuses Caleb and Hanna of being responsible for the flood in an attempt to protect Spencer. Furey then reveals that he has other crucial evidence that could led him to Dunhill's killer, and Hanna worries. She then goes to the Liar's Lament board game to play, and enlists Mona's help. Mona also teams up with Emily to find more information on Alison's terrible fertilization. They visit the doctor who performed the operation, not getting much information. Mona then goes to the address of the doctor's house – which she found in a magazine stolen from his office – and finds an envelope with money. She pressures the doctor, who reveals that he has never seen the giver and that everything was negotiated online. Hanna returns to where Archer was buried, in search of the shovels she and the others used to bury him. She then encounters a park ranger, who reveals the shovels were taken by the authorities.

Meanwhile, Caleb meets with Ashley Marin, who just got back to Rosewood. Ashley worries that Hanna may be in danger and asks Caleb for information, who denies any possibility of peril. Ashley visits Hanna in her apartment in order to find out if there is anything wrong. However, Caleb proposes to Hanna in front of Ashley. Afterwards, Caleb and Hanna camp in a grove and made a sort of replica of marriage. Emily looks for Mona in her apartment, but Mona says she will return with the investigations the next day, driving Emily out. Through the peephole, Mona watches Emily leaving the hallway and walks into a room. There, she starts working on a computer while the camera shows sketches of the Liars' Lament board game, pictures of Charlotte, Spencer and Alison, the shovels Hanna was searching for, and some stuffs which could link her to "A.D."

== Cast ==
Following is the list of billed cast.

=== Main ===
- Troian Bellisario as Spencer Hastings
- Ashley Benson as Hanna Marin
- Tyler Blackburn as Caleb Rivers
- Lucy Hale as Aria Montgomery
- Ian Harding as Ezra Fitz
- Laura Leighton as Ashley Marin
- Shay Mitchell as Emily Fields
- Andrea Parker as Mary Drake and Jessica DiLaurentis
- Janel Parrish as Mona Vanderwaal
- Sasha Pieterse as Alison DiLaurentis

=== Recurring ===
- Nolan North as Peter Hastings
- Lesley Fera as Senator Veronica Hastings
- Nicholas Gonzalez as Detective Marco Furey

=== Guest ===
- Max Deacon as Dr. Handlin
- Ajgie Kirkland as the park ranger

== Production ==
"Driving Miss Crazy" was co-written by Goldstick and Francesca Rollins, making it their last work on the show.

=== Filming ===
Goldstick directed the installment, which was filmed in September 2016 in and around Los Angeles, California, mostly on the Warner Bros. studio backlot in Burbank. The table read occurred on September 1, 2016.

=== Music ===
It features the songs "Mambo No. 1" by Andrew Oye, "Silence Worth Breaking" by Brooke Annibale, "Hold Your Ground" by Fleurie, "Wish Something Would Happen" by Cheshires, "Light Me Up" by Ingrid Michaelson, "Break" by ADLT VDEO, and a cover of "Jailhouse Rock" performed by Janel Parrish and part of the cast. The score is composed by Michael Suby, who works in it since the show's premiere.

=== Casting ===
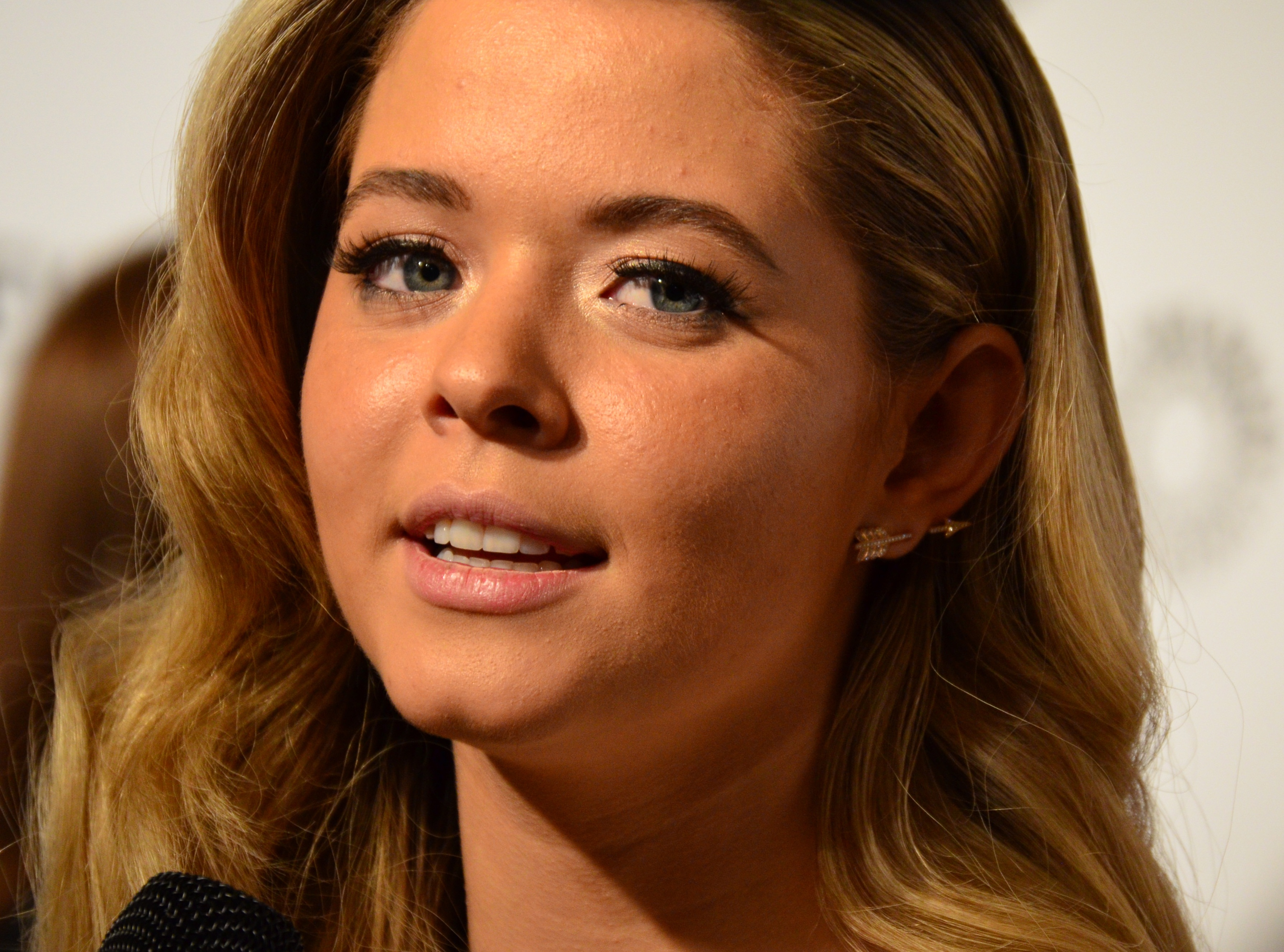
Sasha Pieterse does not appears in this episode.

Every member of the ensemble cast appears in this installment, with the exception of Sasha Pieterse. Actress Laura Leighton, who left the regular cast after the Season 6 finale, returned to the main listing for this episode. The episode features recurring appearances from Nolan North as Peter Hastings, Lesley Fera as Senator Veronica Hastings and Nicholas Gonzalez as Detective Marco Furey.

== Reception ==
=== Ratings ===
"Driving Miss Crazy" premiered on the Freeform channel on June 6, 2017, to an audience of 0.97 million viewers, scoring a 0.5/2 Nielsen rating/share in the adults among the 18–49 demographic. Both values were an increase from the previous episode, "The Glove That Rocks the Cradle".

=== Response ===
Isabella Biedenharn of Entertainment Weekly gave the episode a B rating. Gavin Hetherington of SpoilerTV write a favorable review for the episode, stating, "I'll throw my hands up and say I enjoyed it, as strange as it was, I enjoyed every second of it. [The musical number]'s perhaps not the only weird thing to happen in this episode, which would be how I would describe 'Driving Miss Crazy'. I mean, whoever thought we would also see Mona and Emily as a couple (albeit not real but still perfectly executed by Mona), as well as a couple of twists at the end that have made me freeze and go 'hold on a minute, what fresh hell is this?' But, the journey to the finish line remains a bumpy one, but it's a journey I am so glad to be on." He added, "No matter what people say, I have enjoyed 7B so far and I continue to enjoy it now. This was a very good episode."

On the other hand, Paul Dailly of TV Fanatic gave the episode a 3 out of 5 stars rating, writing, "[the episode] was not great. It was all over the place, with the characters all going in different directions. There were some good scenes, but they were ruined by the sheer amount of nonsensical plot twists." Lauren Busser of Tell-Tale TV gave the episode 4.7 out of 5 stars. The episode received a 4 out of 5 stars rating from Jessica Goldstein of Vulture.
