= Choose or Lose =

- Pretty Little Liars episode
- Episode no.: Season 7 Episode 18
- Directed by: Norman Buckley
- Written by: Charlie Craig
- Cinematography by: Larry Reibman
- Editing by: Melissa Gearhart
- Production code: 2M7218
- Original air date: June 13, 2017
- Running time: 42 minutes

Guest appearances
- Keegan Allen as Toby Cavanaugh; Roma Maffia as Lieutenant Tanner; Jim Titus as Detective Barry Maple

Episode chronology
← Previous "Driving Miss Crazy"	Next → "Farewell, My Lovely"
- Pretty Little Liars (season 7)

"Choose or Lose" is the eighteenth episode of the seventh season of Pretty Little Liars, and the show's 158th episode overall, which premiered on the Freeform network in the United States on June 13, 2017. The episode was directed by Norman Buckley and written by Charlie Craig. In this episode, the Liars finally discover that Aria (Lucy Hale) has been working with 'A.D.' after Mona (Janel Parrish) investigated on Aria. Lieutenant Tanner (Roma Maffia) returns to Rosewood to work on the Dunhill's homicide case, quickly targeting the Liars on her radar. Caleb (Tyler Blackburn) and Hanna (Ashley Benson) secretly marry, while Alison (Sasha Pieterse) and Emily (Shay Mitchell) step forward with their relationship.

== Plot ==
Rosewood P.D. officers confiscate the Liars' personal stuff and cellphones through search warrants. Enraged, Spencer heads to the station to understand what's going on, and discovers that Detective Tanner is now handling the Dunhill case. Tanner expresses her concern about the possibility of the Liars being involved in the case, and indirectly threatens Spencer, saying that she always found them guilty of something, just did not know of what exactly. After her phone was taken, Aria discovers another one hidden inside an air duct that 'A.D.' left to communicate with her. Aria claims to meet 'A.D.' since she is a reliable person, and the tormentor sets a date, as long as Aria wears her uniform. In a room of The Radley, given by Hanna's mother, the Liars and Caleb get together to discuss the Dunhill's murder when the board game begins a new round: "Choose or Lose". The Liars have to choose one of them to go to jail accused of the murder or all of them go. Mona arrives shortly thereafter and warns the girls that she thinks Aria is on the 'A.D.' team. The girls initially don't believe, but Mona exhibits evidence and a recording of Aria and 'A.D.', leaving them in panic. Detective Tanner finds pieces of a windshield in the drain of Spencer's bathroom with traces of blood.

At night, Aria goes to the meeting place which 'A.D.' has set on. However, the tormentor doesn't show up and Aria is caught by the Liars, who are devastated when Aria says that she needed to protect Ezra, so she joined 'A.D.' Aria explains that, six years earlier, after Ezra revealed to be writing a book about Alison, she filed a complaint against Ezra, but never reported it, and somehow 'A.D.' had access to it, threatening her right after. Tanner calls Alison asking for their presence at the station, and the girls leave Aria alone in the woods. At the police station, Tanner gives the girls a chance to tell their side of the story, but Spencer denies the opportunity. Again, the girls leave Aria alone, punishing her for destroying Alison and Emily's nursery and for tearing Spencer's family apart.

The next morning, Spencer goes to Ezra's apartment to talk to Aria, giving her a photo of them as teens, before Alison's disappearance. They try to reconcile, but Tanner and her convoy appear suddenly, returning Aria's things and saying they found footage of Aria outside of Rosewood on the day of Archer's death, sparing her of any charges. Spencer leaves the apartment angrily. Ashley is still worried about Hanna and that she might be in trouble. However, this fades when Caleb and Hanna get married at the courthouse with Ashley as a witness. Emily and Alison have sex during an improvised picnic prepared by Alison. Aria tells Ezra she has something to tell him, but claims she needs to kiss him one last time, since this secret could ruin them. Spencer visits Toby in his cabin and they have sex. While investigating, Caleb and Ezra find the cell tower location from which the game phone has been sending signals, and later discover that they are being sent from Mona's house. While leaving to find Spencer, Aria hears a loud noise in the back of her car and opens the trunk to find Archer's body. A cop arrives right after.

== Cast ==
Every member of the ensemble cast appears in this installment, with the exception of Andrea Parker. Laura Leighton appears in the episode, making it her second credit as a regular character on Season 7. The episode also features recurring appearances of Keegan Allen as Toby Cavanaugh, Roma Maffia as Lieutenant Linda Tanner, and Jim Titus as Detective Barry Maple. Maffia returns for the series on this episode after last appearing on the second half of the previous season.

Following is the list of billed cast.

=== Main ===
- Troian Bellisario as Spencer Hastings
- Ashley Benson as Hanna Marin
- Tyler Blackburn as Caleb Rivers
- Lucy Hale as Aria Montgomery
- Ian Harding as Ezra Fitz
- Laura Leighton as Ashley Marin
- Shay Mitchell as Emily Fields
- Andrea Parker as Mary Drake and Jessica DiLaurentis
- Janel Parrish as Mona Vanderwaal
- Sasha Pieterse as Alison DiLaurentis

=== Recurring ===
- Keegan Allen as Toby Cavanaugh
- Roma Maffia as Lieutenant Linda Tanner
- Jim Titus as Detective Barry Maple

== Production ==
"Choose or Lose" was written by Charlie Craig and directed by Norman Buckley, making it their last work on the show. The table-read occurred on September 19, 2016. The installment was filmed in September 2016 in and around Los Angeles, California, mostly on the Warner Bros. studio backlot in Burbank.

== Reception ==
=== Ratings ===
"Choose or Lose" premiered on Freeform on June 13, 2017, to an audience of 0.96 million viewers, scoring a 0.4 Nielsen rating/share in the adults among the 18–49 demographic. This was a slightly decrease from the previous episode.

=== Response ===
Gavin Hetherington gave the episode a mixed reviews, stating: "More revelations could have happened in this episode to help clear things up instead of wasting time doing other things, but I'm now hoping the big things will be wrapped up in a satisfactory way." Isabella Biedenharn of Entertainment Weekly gave the episode a B+ letter rating.
