= Free Fall (Pretty Little Liars) =

- Pretty Little Liars episode
- Episode no.: Season 4 Episode 20
- Directed by: Melanie Mayron
- Written by: Maya Goldsmith
- Original air date: February 18, 2014
- Running time: 43 minutes

Guest appearances
- Keegan Allen as Toby Cavanaugh; Cody Christian as Mike Montgomery; Lesley Fera as Veronica Hastings

Episode chronology
← Previous "Shadow Play"	Next → "She's Come Undone"
- Pretty Little Liars season 4

"Free Fall" is the twentieth episode of the fourth season of Pretty Little Liars, an American mystery drama television series based on the novel series written by Sara Shepard, and is the ninety-first episode of the series. The episode, directed by Melanie Mayron and written by Maya Goldsmith, originally aired on February 18, 2014 on ABC Family. In the episode, Spencer is ready to tell Aria that Ezra is "A", while Hanna and Emily, worried that Aria will be hurt, remain hesitant. Meanwhile, Spencer’s addiction to amphetamines is exposed, causing damage to her credibility among the Liars.

“Free Fall” yielded 2.56 million viewers and a 1.0 demo rating, up from the previous episode. It received highly positive reviews from contemporary critics, with the performances of Bellisario and Hale receiving widespread acclaim, as well as praise for the episode's dialogue between Ashley Benson and Shay Mitchell’s characters, drawing comparisons to Rosencrantz and Guildenstern.

== Plot ==
Spencer (Troian Bellisario) is eager to tell Aria (Lucy Hale) that Ezra (Ian Harding) is “A”, but Hanna (Ashley Benson) and Emily (Shay Mitchell) are not sure when the best time is. After catching Spencer in his classroom in her pajamas, Ezra tells Aria about Spencer’s addiction to amphetamines as well as a previous incident involving them. She tells Hanna and Emily and they all hold an intervention at Spencer’s house. When confronted with the truth, Spencer breaks down and confesses that Ezra is “A” while continuing to deny the truth.

Spencer tries to explain to Hanna and Emily the inconsistencies she discovered in Alison’s journal, which leads to a plan to lure Ezra out of obscurity using a bag of money for Ali. Hanna and Emily meet at Ambrose Pavilion to catch Ezra and wait for Spencer to arrive, who is supposed to be dressed as Alison. Someone dressed as Alison arrives and the girls assume its Spencer. Spencer comes later and the girls realize it was "A", not Spencer. They attempt to follow the girl but she runs off and the room’s lights start short-circuiting. As the girls are about to leave, Emily notices the bag and takes it, while Hanna notices a blonde wig in the trash.

Aria tells Ezra about the intervention and he lets slip some information that Aria did not share with him, causing some suspicion. She later goes to his cabin, where she finds his manuscript detailing the lives of all the girls, including Alison. She runs off into the forest, trying to hide from Ezra, and eventually boards a ski lift. Ezra catches her as the lift is about to go and tries to explain everything. Aria, in disbelief, threatens to expose the manuscript but Ezra knocks it out of her hands.

Meanwhile, Mona (Janel Parrish) and Mike (Cody Christian) continue their relationship, but Mona struggles to keep her past behind as Ezra continues pressing her for help. Veronica (Lesley Fera) and Toby (Keegan Allen) discovers Spencer’s relapse.

== Production ==
“Free Fall” was written by Maya Goldsmith and directed by Melanie Mayron. This is Goldsmith fourth writing credit for the season and Mayron’s second directing credit, following “Bring Down the Hoe”. The table read for the episode began on September 17, 2013 and the episode was filmed between September 18, 2013 and September 25, 2013. The episode features recurring appearances from Keegan Allen as Toby Cavanaugh, Cody Christian as Mike Montgomery, and Lesley Fera as Veronica Hastings.

== Reception ==
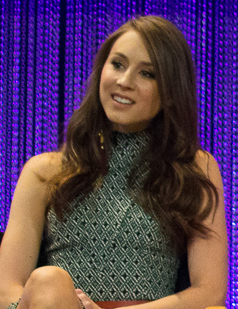
Troian Bellisario's performance as Spencer Hastings received widespread acclaim, with critics lauding her honest, realistic portrayal of addiction.

=== Ratings ===
“Free Fall” premiered on February 18, 2014 on ABC Family to an audience of 2.56 million viewers, up eighteen percent from the previous episode. It also garnered the highest viewership the season four episode "Close Encounters". The episode garnered a 1.0 in the adults 18-49 demographic, translating to 1.3 million viewers. This was up eighteen percent from the previous episode “Shadow Play”, which garnered 1.1 million viewers in the demographic.

=== Reviews ===
Teresa Lopez of TV Fanatic rated the episode 5 stars, commenting that "it actually exceeded my expectations" and called it "quite the exciting hour of television." Nick Campbell of TV.com praised the writers of the episode for Ezra’s storyline and for Hanna and Emily’s dialogue, making comparisons to Rosencrantz and Guildenstern and Shaggy and Scooby-Doo. Jessica Goldstein of Vulture also highlighted Emily and Hanna’s dialogue, writing that she "gets all the best one-liners" and praised Lesley Fera’s character for showing good parenting when confronted with Spencer’s addiction.
