= Ravenswood (TV series) =

American television series

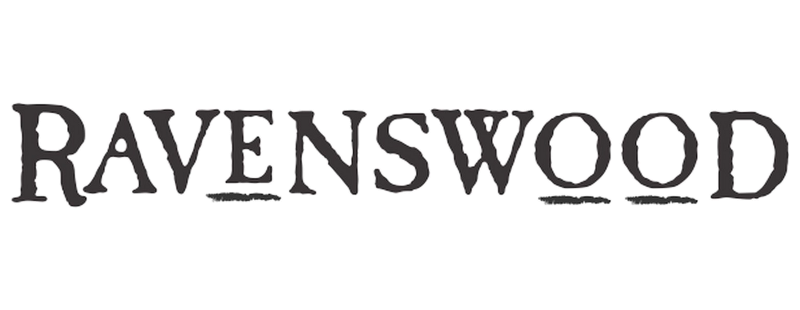
- Genre: Teen drama; Mystery; Thriller; Supernatural drama; Magic realism; Horror
- Created by: Joseph Dougherty; Oliver Goldstick; I. Marlene King
- Starring: Nicole Gale Anderson; Tyler Blackburn; Steven Cabral; Brett Dier; Britne Oldford; Merritt Patterson
- Composers: Michael Suby; Joel J. Richard
- Country of origin: United States
- Original language: English
- No. of seasons: 1
- No. of episodes: 10

Production
- Executive producers: Leslie Morgenstein; I. Marlene King; Oliver Goldstick; Joseph Dougherty
- Producer: Nelson Soler
- Running time: 42 minutes
- Production companies: Warner Horizon Television; Alloy Entertainment; Long Lake Productions; Russian Hill Productions; Jardynce & Jarndyce Inc

Original release
- Network: ABC Family
- Release: October 22, 2013 – February 4, 2014

Related
- Pretty Little Liars franchise

Ravenswood is an American supernatural teen drama mystery-thriller television series created by I. Marlene King, Oliver Goldstick and Joseph Dougherty. The show premiered on ABC Family on October 22, 2013 and ended on February 4, 2014. It is the first spin-off series of Pretty Little Liars and the second series in the Pretty Little Liars franchise.

On February 14, 2014, Ravenswood was canceled by the network, due to low ratings after one season.

== Plot ==
Set in the fictional town of Ravenswood, Pennsylvania, the series follows five strangers whose lives become intertwined by a deadly curse that has plagued their town for generations. They have to dig into the town's dark past to solve the mysterious curse.

== Cast and characters ==
=== Main ===
- Nicole Gale Anderson as Miranda Collins / Original Miranda:
  Miranda meets Caleb on a bus to Ravenswood where she is going to find her uncle, Raymond Collins, her last remaining relative. Walking into her uncle's house, she helps Hanna escape, not knowing that she is Caleb's girlfriend. Miranda also finds a tombstone with her name and picture on it. Anderson also played the original version of Miranda in the 1910s, from the series' flashback scenes.
- Tyler Blackburn as Caleb Rivers / Original Caleb:
  Caleb meets Miranda on the bus to Ravenswood where he's going to help his girlfriend, Hanna Marin. After Hanna meets Miranda and hears her story, she asks Caleb to stay in Ravenswood to help Miranda. Caleb finds a tombstone bearing his name and picture in the town cemetery and vows to stay until he figures out what it means. Blackburn also played the original version of Caleb in the 1910s, from the series' flashback scenes.
- Steven Cabral as Raymond Collins:
  Miranda's uncle who runs a funeral home. He sent Miranda into foster care when her parents died over 10 years ago. Miranda comes to Ravenswood to find him.
- Brett Dier as Luke Matheson:
  Olivia's twin brother and Remy's boyfriend. Luke doesn't trust his twin sister's friends, and vows to protect both his mother and sister as the man of their family.
- Britne Oldford as Remy Beaumont:
  An employee at the Ravenswood Gazette, the town newspaper, where her father is the editor-in-chief, who helps Caleb find the death record of his look-alike. Remy is Luke's girlfriend and is the first to form a theory about the curse.
- Merritt Patterson as Olivia Matheson:
  Luke's twin sister. Olivia is more out in the open than her brother. She cares about what people think of her mother, but that doesn't stop her from living her life. Olivia formerly dated Dillon but the relationship ended after she found out Dillon killed her father.

=== Recurring ===
- Luke Benward as Dillon Sanders, Olivia's ex-boyfriend
- Meg Foster as Carla Grunwald, a no-nonsense, stubborn 10-year resident of Ravenswood who used to be a house mother for a college sorority. She reprises her role from Pretty Little Liars. She has a sense for the paranormal and can see ghosts when she sleeps at night. She tries to make contact with Alison DiLaurentis and other deceased residents of Rosewood.
- Henry Simmons as Simon Beaumont, Remy's father who is distrustful of out-of-towners
- Sophina Brown as Terry Beaumont, Remy's mother. She has recently returned home from military deployment and is struggling with survivor's guilt. Like the previous survivors, Terry could be the reason for her own daughter's near death.
- Haley Lu Richardson as Tess Hamilton, Olivia's former best friend who is not involved in the curse. Tess stakes her claim on the position of queen bee with Olivia off of the throne.
- Laura Allen as Rochelle Matheson, Luke and Olivia's mother. She is a confident woman and is the main suspect in the murder of her husband.
- Justin Bruening as Benjamin Price, a teacher at Ravenswood High School
- Jay Huguley as Chief Tom Beddington
- Corrina Roshea as the Edwardian ghost
- Mary Elise Hayden as Bea Hamilton, Carla's deceased mother
- Griff Furst as Gabriel Abaddon

=== Guest ===
- Ashley Benson as Hanna Marin, Caleb's ex-girlfriend. Benson reprises her role from Pretty Little Liars.
- Bernard Curry as Jamie Doyle, Caleb's father. Curry reprises his role from Pretty Little Liars.

== Development and production ==
On March 26, 2013, ABC Family announced a spin-off series of Pretty Little Liars, set in the fictional town of Ravenswood from the original series. The show debuted on October 22, 2013, following the Pretty Little Liars Halloween special episode "Grave New World".

=== Casting ===
On April 30, 2013, it was revealed that Tyler Blackburn would reprise his Pretty Little Liars role as Caleb Rivers in Ravenswood. On May 6, 2013, it was revealed that Brett Dier and Elizabeth Whitson will play twins, Abel and Olivia, in the series. It was later stated that the character of Abel had been renamed Luke. On May 7, 2013, it was announced that Merritt Patterson would join the show as Olivia's best friend, Tess Hamilton. On May 10, 2013, it was announced that Nicole Gale Anderson would join the show as Miranda Collins. In May 2013, it was announced that Meg Foster would join the cast as Ravenswood resident Mrs. Grunwald, who made her first appearance in the fourth season episode "Under the Gun" of Pretty Little Liars. On July 16, 2013, it was announced that Merritt Patterson would be replacing Elizabeth Whitson in the role of Olivia. In August 2013, it was announced that Steven Cabral joined the cast as Raymond Collins (a character originally played by Vince Lasalvia in "Grave New World"), Luke Benward joined the cast as Dillon, Henry Simmons joined the cast as Simon Beaumont, Sophina Brown joined the cast as Terry Beaumont, and Haley Lu Richardson joined the cast as a replacement for Patterson's former role of Tess. On August 27, 2013, it was announced that Justin Bruening joined the cast as Benjamin Price. In October 2013, Jay Huguley was announced to have joined the cast as Police Chief Tom Beddington. In November 2013, Mary Elise Hayden joined the cast as Bea Hamilton.

=== Filming ===
Filming started on August 21, 2013, in New Orleans, Louisiana.

== Episodes ==
=== Backdoor pilot (2013) ===
No. overall	No. in season	Title	Directed by	Written by	Original release date	U.S. viewers (millions)
84	13	"Grave New World"	Ron Lagomarsino	Joseph Dougherty & Oliver Goldstick & I. Marlene King	October 22, 2013	3.18
Aria, Emily, Hanna, and Spencer crash the Ravenswood Founders Day Celebration following the revelation that Alison could be alive. Ezra is also there and is seen dressed in a World War I era soldiers uniform. The girls see Red Coat and attempt to follow her but she escapes before they can get to her. Caleb arrives in Ravenswood and meets Miranda and they bond. Hanna becomes separated from the rest of the Liars and finds herself trapped in a phone booth where she sees Alison through the glass before she is attacked by "A". Spencer is also attacked in a greenhouse by Ezra, who is dressed in his World War I uniform, where she cuts his hand. Mrs. Grunwald tells the girls that one of them has been touched by the one Alison fears the most. This would suggest that Beach Hottie, aka Board Shorts, attacked Spencer and Alison. Caleb decides to stay in Ravenswood after he finds his and Miranda's names and photos on graves. Spencer's tires are slashed and Ezra suspiciously picks the Liars up. Once back in Rosewood, the Liars see Red Coat again and follow her to Spencer's back yard where she takes off her hood. It's Alison, alive and well. She tells them she still cannot come back to Rosewood because it's not safe. Ezra turns up with Aria's phone and when they turn back around Alison has gone. The Liars are perplexed by Alison's disappearance yet again. This episode also serves as a backdoor pilot of the series’ spinoff Ravenswood.

=== Season 1 (2013–14) ===
No.	Title	Directed by	Written by	Original release date	U.S. viewers (millions)
1	"Pilot"	Ron Lagomarsino	Joseph Dougherty & Oliver Goldstick & I. Marlene King	October 22, 2013	2.12
When Miranda and Caleb arrive at Ravenswood, they find tombstones with their names and pictures on. Miranda goes after her uncle to find some answers about her past and her parents. Meanwhile, Olivia and Luke, who lost their father have to support their mother because the people in the city think she killed him. When Caleb meets Remy, he asks for help about the tombstones which Remy accepts. Caleb, Miranda and Remy find out part of the story behind their tombstones. In the final scene, Remy drives Caleb, Miranda, Olivia and Luke over a bridge. Miranda sees the same figure (ghost): she has seen during the episode causing a distraction so the car veers off the bridge into the water.
2	"Death and the Maiden"	Rob Hardy	Joseph Dougherty	October 29, 2013	1.10
After the accident, the doctors could not save Miranda and she passes away. Right after her death, Caleb starts seeing Miranda which he thinks are just dreams. Luke shows Olivia a letter which he finds and he thinks their mother was cheating on their father. Caleb then looks to take Miranda's things from Remy's car and he asks her for help. When the two take Miranda's bag they are chased by a dog but Luke appears to save them. Miranda's uncle asks Caleb to stay with them in the house, which he accepts. Meanwhile, Olivia is crowned Homecoming Queen and when she goes to the photoshoot she realize that Tess is dating Springer. Remy nearly gets killed when she sleepwalks again. In the final scene, Miranda explains to Caleb why and how he is seeing her and that she died way back in the ambulance.
3	"Believe"	Ron Lagomarsino	Jill Blotevogel	November 5, 2013	1.03
After Miranda's funeral, Caleb tells Remy, Luke and Olivia that he has seen her. The four decide that it is time for them to stick together for their safety. Miranda's uncle allows Caleb to stay in the guest house. The five teens call the spirit of a dead person who provides them with some answers. At the close of the episode all of them are able to see Miranda who is mysteriously glowing.
4	"The Devil Has a Face"	Arlene Sanford	Oliver Goldstick	November 12, 2013	1.07
Since Luke was still unnerved by what he witnessed during the séance, he searched for something that would distract himself. However he realizes there may be no escape from what is haunting the group. Luke is surprised to find common ground with Tess when they work on the play together. Olivia bonds with Miranda and is surprised to discover their families may have a shared history. Caleb meets a long-lost relative in the hopes of better understanding his current situation, but is caught between new and old loyalties when he struggles to share what is happening in Ravenswood with his girlfriend, Hanna. And Miranda thinks she may have finally found what she has been searching for, her mother.
5	"Scared to Death"	Norman Buckley	I. Marlene King	November 19, 2013	1.11
Caleb is trying to find Miranda but hits a dead end when the address he is given turns out to be an empty lawn. Remy wakes up in the basement of an old building where a couple is said to have buried themselves behind a wall in hopes of resurrecting the original Caleb and Miranda. The group finally arrives at the right address to save Miranda last minute before the building collapses. It turns out that a little girl in red and Olivia's boyfriend (Dillon) are behind the plot against the group.
6	"Revival"	Mick Garris	Nelson Soler	January 7, 2014	1.69
Caleb attempts to make sense of the time he spent with Miranda; Meanwhile, Miranda seeks answers from Mrs. Grunwald, Remy's dreams take a turn in attracting the attention of a dangerous being; Olivia fails to see Dillon's true intentions.
7	"Home is Where the Heart Is – Seriously Check the Floorboards"	Janice Cooke	Sean Reycraft	January 14, 2014	1.13
Miranda gains insight on Grunwald when she meets Beatrice "Bea" Stevens (Mary Elise Hayden), Grunwald's mother who died at age 17, Caleb's father comes to Ravenswood after their last living relative dies leaving his father a house. Remy's sleep walking takes an ugly turn by harming her father. Tess reaches out to Olivia. Olivia ties of events from past and present come undone.
8	"I'll Sleep When I'm Dead"	Mick Garris	Jill Blotevogel & Zachary Dodes	January 21, 2014	1.23
Remy seeks help at a sleep clinic after hurting her father in her sleep. Miranda discovers new consequences for leaving the Collins' house after breaking the jar. Caleb seeks a lesson in Ravenswood town history from Mr. Price. And Olivia finally learns of Dillon's true colors.
9	"Along Came a Spider"	Joshua Butler	Oliver Goldstick & Francesca Rollins	January 28, 2014	1.05
An arrest is made in the murder of Luke and Olivia's father leads Dillion to help her; Miranda attempts to discover the Collins Family secret; Meanwhile, Caleb begins school in Ravenswood.
10	"My Haunted Heart"	Ron Lagomarsino	Joseph Dougherty	February 4, 2014	1.39
Hanna Marin arrives and demands Caleb tell her the truth about what has been happening in Ravenswood. Meanwhile, Luke and Olivia discover the truth about what happened to their father and Remy goes missing. Hanna meets Max, who she saw previously. Miranda's uncle attempts to save them by releasing the original Caleb Rivers who believes Miranda is the original Miranda. Note: This episode is a crossover with Pretty Little Liars.

== Reception ==
=== Critical response ===
On review aggregator Rotten Tomatoes, the series holds an approval rating of 75% based on 12 reviews, with an average rating of 6.06/10. The site's consensus reads: "Darker than expected from a Pretty Little Liars spin-off, Ravenswood legitimately elicits chills and surprises with an attractive young cast."

Television critic David Hinckley of the New York Daily News gave the show 3 out of 5 stars, saying that the show was "entertaining, and creepier than its parent show." Scott D. Pierce of The Salt Lake Tribune said the show was "ridiculous, but might be fun." Margaret Lyons of New York Magazine Vulture claims the show "only meets generic expectations and needs to show us more than cheap fright-gags if it wants to avoid cancellation..."
