= Good Bad Things =

2024 film directed by Shane D. Stanger

- Film poster
- Directed by: Shane D. Stanger
- Written by: Shane D. Stanger
- Story by: Danny Kurtzman
- Starring: Danny Kurtzman; Jessica Parker Kennedy; Brett Dier
- Distributed by: Music Box Films
- Release date: January 20, 2024
- Running time: 96 minutes
- Country: United States
- Language: English

Good Bad Things is a 2024 American romantic comedy-drama film directed by Shane D. Stanger, starring Danny Kurtzman, Jessica Parker Kennedy, and Brett Dier.

== Premise ==
Danny, a man with a physical disability, runs a small advertising and marketing company with his roommate Jason. They hope to pitch a new dating app called Rubi. Danny uses Rubi and matches with a photographer named Madi, and the two go on a date together.

== Cast ==
- Danny Kurtzman as Danny
- Jessica Parker Kennedy as Madi
- Gale Hansen as Dad
- Brett Dier as Jason
- William Gabriel Grier as Brett
- Max Adler as Gabe
- Timothy Granaderos as Marco
- Ryan Whitney as Natalie

== Release ==
Good Bad Things premiered at the Slamdance Film Festival in January 2024.

== Reception ==
On the review aggregator website Rotten Tomatoes, 75% of 8 critics' reviews are positive. Writing for RogerEbert.com, Nell Minow gave the film 3.5 stars out of 4, praising Kurtzman's "thoughtful screen presence", though commenting that "the script is not as strong as the performances." Ryan Devir of Film Threat gave the film a positive review, saying that it "beautifully portrays friendship and love" and is "emotionally compelling in its message that we all seek to be accepted, seen, loved, and forgiven."
