= Nicole Gale Anderson =

American actress (born 1990)

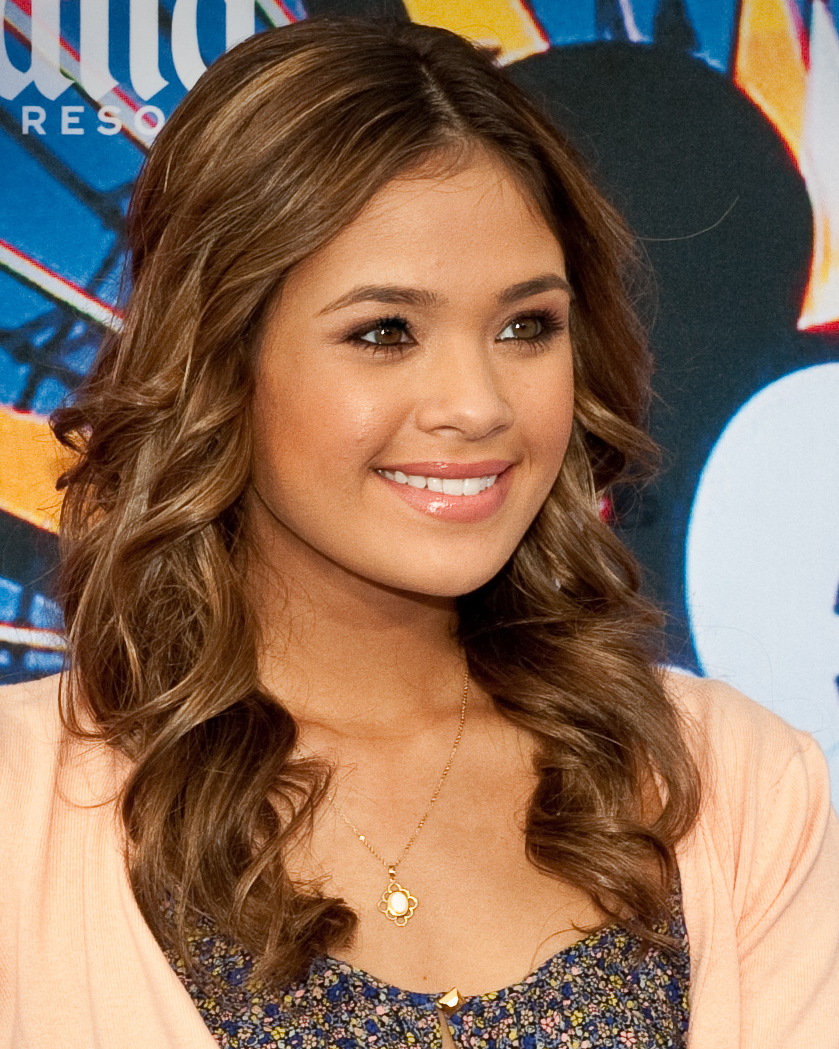
- Anderson in June 2010
- Born: August 29, 1990 (age 35); Rochester, Indiana, U.S.
- Other name: Nicole Anderson
- Occupation: Actress
- Years active: 1996–2018
- Spouse: Roberto Paniagua (m. 2018)
- Children: 1

Nicole Gale Anderson (born August 29, 1990) is an American former actress. She is best known for her role as Heather Chandler on The CW series Beauty & the Beast. She is also known for her roles as Macy Misa in the Disney Channel series Jonas and as Kelly Parker and Miranda Collins respectively on the ABC Family shows Make It or Break It and Ravenswood.

== Early life ==
Anderson was born in Rochester, Indiana. Her father is an American who served as a Commander in the United States Navy, and her mother is of Filipino ethnicity. As a child, she won national gymnastics competitions, but retired due to injuries. Anderson was awarded a scholarship to Georgia's Barbizon Modeling and Acting School at age 13. She then began to study acting and attending auditions. She landed several print ads and television commercials, including Mary-Kate & Ashley Online Clothing, Every Girl, Stand Up, and Bratz Pretty 'n' Punk & Treasures.

== Acting career ==
She auditioned for the role of Stella in the television series Jonas, but actress Chelsea Kane ended up winning the role. After the series plot changed, producers decided to create a best friend for Stella and offered Anderson the role of Macy.

Anderson was added to the cast of the television series Beauty & the Beast in March 2012, playing the recurring role of Heather Chandler, Catherine's (Kristin Kreuk) younger sister. In May 2013, it was announced that Anderson had joined Ravenswood, a Pretty Little Liars spin-off, as Miranda Collins, a foster kid, who relies on her wits to cover her emotional scars. Prior to appearing in Ravenswood, Anderson appeared in the Pretty Little Liars episode "Grave New World", introducing her character, Miranda Collins. After the cancellation of Ravenswood, Anderson returned for the third season of Beauty & the Beast as a regular cast member.

== Philanthropy ==
Anderson served as the first international spokesperson for Underwriters Laboratories Youth Safety Smart program and has participated in Disney's Friends for Change.

== Personal life ==
In January 2018, Anderson married Roberto Paniagua. They have a daughter born July 2020.

In 2018, Anderson began working at a flower shop in Portland, Oregon. She and her husband owned a flower farming business from 2020 to 2023 in Washington state. As of 2024, they currently reside in Seattle, Washington where Anderson works as a floral and event designer.

== Filmography ==
=== Film ===
Year	Title	Role	Notes
2012	Lukewarm	Jessie	
2013	Red Line	Tori	
2014	Never	Meghan	

=== Television ===
Year	Title	Role	Notes
2005	Unfabulous	Cheerleader #3	Episode: "The Grey Area"
2007	Nobody	Leila	Unsold ABC Family pilot
2007	Zoey 101	Maria	Episode: "Quarantine"; credited as Nicole Anderson
2007	Hannah Montana	Marissa Hughes	Episode: "Achy Jakey Heart Part 1"
2007	iCarly	Tasha	Episode: "iNevel"; as Nicole Anderson
2008	Sunday! Sunday! Sunday!	Dana	Unsold Jetix pilot
2008	Princess	Jitterbug / Princess Calliope	Television film
2009–2010	Jonas	Macy Misa	Main role, 29 episodes; credited as Nicole Anderson
2009–2012	Make It or Break It	Kelly Parker	Recurring role; 17 episodes
2009	Imagination Movers	Cinderella	Episode: "A Fairy Tale Ending"
2010	Accused at 17	Bianca Miller	Television film
2011	Mean Girls 2	Hope Plotkin	Television film
2011	Happy Endings	Madison 1	Episode: "Baby Steps"
2011	Ringer	Monica Reynolds	Episode: "Oh Gawd, There's Two of Them?"
2012–2016	Beauty & the Beast	Heather Chandler	Recurring role (seasons 1–2); main role (seasons 3–4)
2013	Pretty Little Liars	Miranda Collins	Episode: "Grave New World"
2013–2014	Ravenswood	Miranda Collins / Original Miranda	Main role
2018	The Wedding Do Over	Abby Anderson	Television film

=== Music videos ===
Year	Title	Artist(s)
2019	"White Noise"	Flor
