= Brett Dier =

Canadian actor (born 1990)

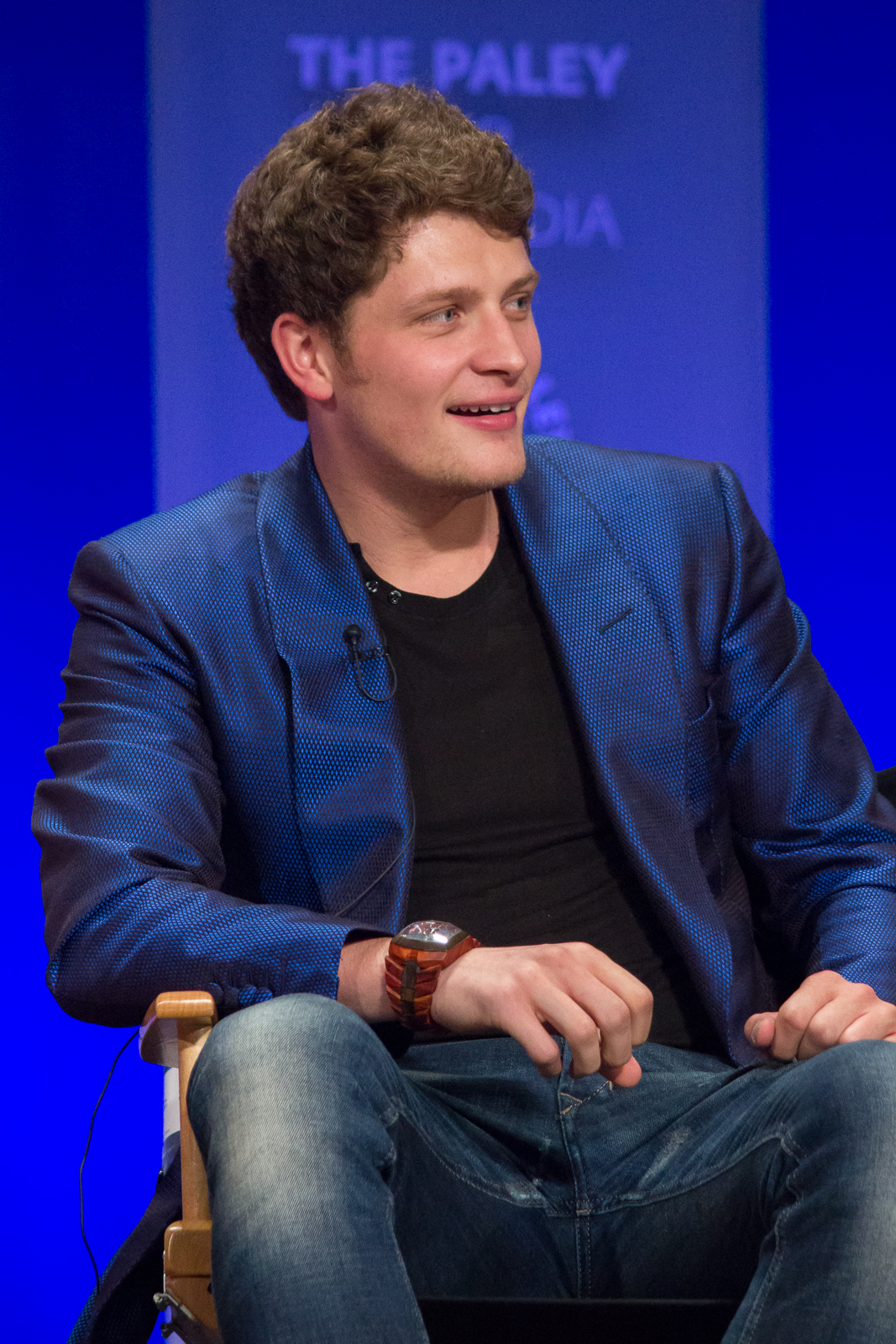
- Dier at the 2015 PaleyFest presentation for Jane the Virgin
- Born: Brett Jordan Dier; February 14, 1990 (age 36); London, Ontario, Canada
- Occupation: Actor
- Years active: 2006–present
- Known for: The L.A. Complex; Bomb Girls; Jane the Virgin
- Spouse: Conor Leslie (m. 2026)

Brett Jordan Dier (/daɪr/; born February 14, 1990) is a Canadian actor. He is best known for his role as Michael Cordero Jr. on Jane the Virgin. He is also known for his recurring roles on the Canadian TV shows Bomb Girls and The L.A. Complex, and for his main role as "C.B." on the ABC sitcom Schooled.

== Early life ==
Dier was born on February 14, 1990, in London, Ontario, and attended London South Collegiate Institute, where he was a standout performer in the school talent show. He grew up with an older sister and younger brother. He studied improv and received his first dan black belt in Taekwondo. He reached the sixth grade of Conservatory Music in piano, including the Suzuki method since the age of four. He also plays the guitar. Dier received honours for his work. He also breakdances and practices swimming and bouldering.

== Career ==
Dier received his debut role in the TV movie Family in Hiding as Matt Peterson in 2006. In 2007, he appeared in Seventeen and Missing and The Secrets of Comforting House. In 2008, he garnered the roles of Caden in Every Second Counts and of an alternate Clark Kent in an episode of Smallville. He appeared in a small role as Derek Edlund in Fear Itself.

In 2010, he had a cameo appearance in Diary of a Wimpy Kid as a breakdancer. He made appearances in Made: The Movie and Meteor Storm. He had a recurring role in Mr. Young as Hutch. He was in another TV movie, Mega Cyclone, as Will Newmar. In 2012, he had a role in Space Twister. In another recurring role, he was Brandon Kelly in The L.A. Complex. He also had a guest-starring role in an episode of the television show Blackstone.

In 2013, he played a lead role on Ravenswood as Luke Matheson. The series was cancelled after one season.

He received critical acclaim for his role in Bomb Girls as Gene Corbett. He appeared in Exeter which was released in 2015. From 2014 to 2019, he played the role of Detective Michael Cordero Jr. in Jane the Virgin.

On October 3, 2018, Deadline announced that Dier would have a series-regular role on the ABC situation comedy Schooled as C.B., a teacher who is both a friend and rival to rookie teacher Lainey Lewis who is also based on series co-creator Adam F. Goldberg's favourite teacher and friend.

== Personal life ==
Dier married actress Conor Leslie in September 2026.

== Filmography ==
Key
†	Denotes films that have not yet been released

Film
Year	Title	Role	Notes
2007	Battle in Seattle	Protester #2	
2010	Dear Mr. Gacy	Marcus	
2010	Diary of a Wimpy Kid	80s Breakdancer	
2013	Barbie in the Pink Shoes	Dillon / Prince Seigfried	Voice
2013	The Wedding Chapel	Young Larry	
2014	Grace	Brad	
2014	Poker Night	New Detective	
2015	Exeter	Brad	
2018	Snapshots	Zee	
2018	The New Romantic	Jacob	
2018	Genèse	Todd	
2021	After Yang	Aaron	
2022	Fresh	Chad	
2023	Scrambled	Kyle	
2023	About My Father	Doug Collins	
2023	Maybe It's You	Peter	
2024	Good Bad Things	Jason	

Television
Year	Title	Role	Notes
2006	Family in Hiding	Matt Peterson	TV movie
2006	The Secrets of Comfort House	Bradley	TV movie
2007	Seventeen and Missing	Kevin Janzen	TV movie
2007	Kaya	Jake	Episode: "You Can't Always Get What You Want"
2007	Aliens in America	Junior #1	Episode: "Junior Prank"
2008	Smallville	Alternate Clark Kent	Episode: "Apocalypse"
2008	Every Second Counts	Caden	TV movie
2008	Fear Itself	Derek Edlund	Episode: "Skin and Bones"
2009	Phantom Racer	Taz	TV movie
2009	The Troop	Richard	Episode: "Forest Grump"
2010	Meteor Storm	Jason	TV movie
2010	Supernatural	Dylan	Episode: "99 Problems"
2010	V	James May	Episode: "John May"
2010	Goblin	Matt	TV movie
2010	Made... The Movie	Marshall	TV movie
2011	Shattered	Jonah Simms	Episode: "Key with No Lock"
2011	Goodnight for Justice	Young Clerk	TV movie
2011	Ghost Storm	Rob	TV movie
2011	Mega Cyclone	Will Newmar	TV movie; aka Super Storm
2011	Endgame	Kitch Huxley	Episode: "The White Queen"
2011	Flashpoint	Jaime Dee	Episode: "Run, Jaime, Run"
2011–2013	Mr. Young	Hutch Anderson	Recurring role, 7 episodes
2012	Blackstone	Jake	Episode: "Forgiveness"
2012	The Secret Circle	Kyle	Episode: "Sacrifice"
2012	The L.A. Complex	Brandon Kelly	7 episodes
2013	Emily Owens, M.D.	Henry	Episode: "Emily and... The Social Experiment"
2013	Bomb Girls	Gene Corbett	4 episodes Nominated – Leo Award for Best Guest Performance by a Male Dramatic Series (2014)
2013	Pretty Little Liars	Luke Matheson	Episode: "Grave New World"
2013–2014	Ravenswood	Luke Matheson	Main cast
2013	Mighty Mighty Monsters in Halloween Havoc	Jacob	TV movie
2013	Mighty Mighty Monsters in New Fears Eve	Jacob	TV movie
2014	The Hazing Secret	Brian	TV movie
2014–2019	Jane the Virgin	Det. Michael Cordero Jr.	65 episodes; Main cast (seasons 1-3A, 5); Guest star (season 4)
2015	Backstrom	Archie Danforth	Episode: "Dragon Slayer"
2019–2020	Schooled	C.B.	Main role, 34 episodes
