= Oliver Goldstick =

American screenwriter and producer

Oliver Goldstick (born January 9, 1961) is an American television screenwriter and producer.

Most notably, Goldstick was the creator and executive producer of Inconceivable, a short-lived medical drama. He is credited as executive producer or co-executive producer of Pretty Little Liars, Ravenswood, Lipstick Jungle and The Court. He has been a writer and producer on several television series, including Ugly Betty, Desperate Housewives, Everwood, Caroline in the City, American Dreams, Popular and High School Musical: The Musical: The Series.

As a writer, he has worked on a number of series that also include State of Mind, Partners, Windfall and Down the Shore.

He wrote the play with music Dinah Was, about the life of Dinah Washington. The play ran Off-Broadway in 1998.

His play Wild Boy explores the challenges of autism.
