= Jim Titus =

American actor

- Born: May 7, 1981 (age 45); New York City, New York, U.S.
- Occupation: Actor
- Years active: 1998–present
- Partner: Kyla P. Settles (m. 2006)
- Parent(s): James T. Williams Sr. Ellie Winslow

Jim Titus (born May 7, 1981, New York) is an American film and television actor.

Titus is the son of James T. Williams Sr. and Film & Television make-up artist Ellie Winslow. He has appeared in television shows, including FOX's The Mindy Project, NBC's Heroes, ABC's My Wife and Kids, Nickelodeon's Taina, and CBS' Without a Trace & Judging Amy. In 2003 Jim had a recurring role as "Officer Marvin Bryson" on the NBC hit Law & Order: Special Victims Unit. In 2010, he was cast as recurring Guest Star "Officer Barry Maple" on ABC Family's #1 hit Pretty Little Liars.

Titus has also appeared in films, including Gus Van Sant's critically acclaimed Finding Forrester starring Sean Connery, and several independent films, including the Sundance Film Festival Official Selections Rhythm of the Saints, and This Revolution.

In March 2017, Jim Titus Guest Starred on the CBS sitcom Superior Donuts

Jim Titus was announced as one of the stars of the film adaptation of the young adult novel, Eat Brains Love, on December 7, 2017.

In 2026, Jim Titus lent his voice as Officer Powell in 2 episodes of Stranger Things: Tales from '85.

Television
Year	Title	Role	Notes
2026	Stranger Things: Tales from '85	Officer Powell	Recurring role, 2 episodes
2020	Man with a Plan	Officer Phillips	Episode: "Driving Miss Katie"
2020	Curb Your Enthusiasm	FBI Agent 2	Episode: "Beep Panic"
2019	Tommy n Bobby	Doyle	Recurring role, 2 episodes
2018	Code Black	Paramedic	Recurring role, 5 episodes
2018	Alive in Denver	Officer Murphy	Episode: "Not Working"
2018	Arrested Development	Officer Thumm	Recurring role, 2 episodes
2018	Unsolved	Reggie Blaylock	Episode: "Wherever It Leads"
2018	Now We're Talking	Cam	Episode: "#2.3" (CW Seed)
2018	The Jackson Show	Aidan	Episode: "Pilot"
2017	Pretty Little Liars	Officer Barry Maple	Recurring role, 14 episodes
2017	Angie Tribeca	Victor	Episode: "License to Drill"
2017	Superior Donuts	Mike	Episode: "Painted Love"
2016	Fuller House	Driver	Episode: "New Kids in the House"
2016	The Middle	Cop #2	Episode "Trip and Fall"
2016	Veep	Reporter #1	Episode: "Nev-AD-a"
2015	The Goldbergs	Bartender	Episode: "Bill/Murray"
2014	The Comeback	Police Officer #2	Episode: "Valerie Saves the Show"
2014	Criminal Minds	Officer Mike Nash	Episode: "The Itch"
2013	The Mindy Project	Brett	Episode: "Frat Party"
2010	The Bold and the Beautiful	Forrester Guard	Episode: "#1.5881"
2009	Without a Trace	NYPD Patrolman	Episode: "Daylight"
2008	Heroes	Los Angeles Gang Member #1	4 Episode Web Exclusive
2008	Just Jordan	Big Guy	Episode: "Anniversa-What?"
2005	Judging Amy	Alwyn	Episode: "Too Little, Too Late"
2003	Law & Order: Special Victims Unit	Uniform Officer Marvin Bryson	Recurring role, 2 episodes
2002	My Wife and Kids	Delivery Man	Episode: "The Anniversary: Part 2"
2002	Taina	Waiter	Episode: "Bad Review"
2002	Malcolm in the Middle	Circus Burger Employee	Episode: "Reese's Job"
