= Ron Lagomarsino =

American film, theatre, and television director

- Education: Santa Clara University
- Occupations: Film director, television director, theatre director
- Years active: 1981–present

Ron Lagomarsino is an American film, theatre and television director.

== Life and education ==
Lagomarsino is from San Francisco, California. He is an alumnus of Santa Clara University and Tisch School of the Arts.

== Directing credits ==
His television credits include Switched at Birth (TV series), Pretty Little Liars, The Unit, Once and Again, Ghost Whisperer, The Brotherhood of Poland, New Hampshire, Big Shots, Homefront, Picket Fences, The Trials of Rosie O'Neill, My So-Called Life, What About Brian, Ally McBeal, Joan of Arcadia, Side Order of Life, Shark, Another World, thirtysomething, One Life to Live, Running Mates, Hart of Dixie, Baby Boom, Hooperman, Love Monkey, Snowglobe, Century City, My Sister's Keeper, The Fosters, Pop Rocks and Mistresses.

== Awards and nominations ==
In 1985, Lagomarsino was nominated for a Drama Desk Award: Outstanding Director of a Play, for the play, Digby. Two years later, he was nominated again for the play Driving Miss Daisy. He won his nomination for the 1993 Directors Guild of America Award: Outstanding Directorial Achievement in Dramatic Series for the series Picket Fences. He earned a single Daytime Emmy Award nomination in 1985 and Primetime Emmy Award in 1992 for One Life to Live and Homefront, respectively.
