= Aria Montgomery =

- Pretty Little Liars character
- Lucy Hale as Aria Montgomery in the television series.
- First appearance: Pretty Little Liars (2006)
- Created by: Sara Shepard
- Portrayed by: Lucy Hale
- Voiced by: Cassandra Morris (Pretty Little Liars–Wanted); Katie Schorr (The Liars)
- Adapted by: I. Marlene King
- Born: July 22, 1994 (age 32); Rosewood, Pennsylvania

In-universe information
- Full name: Aria Marie Montgomery
- Aliases: Anita; Amy; Tanya; Victoria Blackwell "A.D."; Aria Fitzgerald (past married name; television series); Vivian (by Duncan)
- Nicknames: Pookie Bear; Iceland; Suzy Clueless; Big A (by Mona) "A.D."
- Gender: Female
- Occupation: Publisher (formerly); Author (currently); A (formerly)
- Affiliation: The Liars; The A-Team (formerly)
- Family: Byron Montgomery (father); Ella Rose (mother); Mike Montgomery (brother)
- Spouses: Ezra Fitzgerald (husband; television)
- Significant others: Television: Noel Kahn (ex-boyfriend; deceased); Jake (ex-boyfriend); Andrew Campbell (ex-boyfriend); Jason DiLaurentis (ex-boyfriend); Liam Greene (ex-boyfriend); Novels: Noel Kahn (Boyfriend); Ezra Fitz (ex-boyfriend); Sean Ackard (ex-boyfriend); Xavier (ex-crush); Jason DiLaurentis (ex-boyfriend); Halbjorn (ex-boyfriend)
- Children: Katherine Ella Fitzgerald (adopted daughter with Ezra)
- Relatives: Jack Rose (maternal grandfather); Judy Rose (maternal grandmother); Scott Montgomery (paternal uncle); Sarah (aunt); Danny (uncle); Ruth (aunt)
- Residence: Rosewood, Pennsylvania; Boston, Massachusetts; Iceland
- Education: Novels: Rosewood Day School (graduated); Television: Rosewood High School (graduated); Savannah College of Art and Design (formerly; transferred out); Boston University (graduated)
- Seasons: 1–7

Aria Marie Montgomery is a fictional character in the Pretty Little Liars franchise created by American author Sara Shepard. Described as an “alternative” and artsy teen, the franchise revolves around Aria and her three best friends (Spencer Hastings, Hanna Marin and Emily Fields) being blackmailed, stalked and tortured by an anonymous identity known as “A” after the disappearance of their friend Alison DiLaurentis.

Aria is well known for her longtime relationship and eventual marriage with Ezra Fitz.

The character is portrayed by Lucy Hale in the television series.

== Characterization ==
In the book series, Aria is described as gorgeous, tall, lean with short blue-black hair, startling ice-blue eyes and an angular face. Aria is artsy and imaginative, has a hipster style, and a passion for knitting and writing. She is also described as Rosewood's 'weird girl'.

On another interview with ClevverTV.com, Lucy Hale said, "She’s like an old soul with an espectacular body and she knows what she wants… she’s very cool, she’s got it put together." While also commenting on her style: "She’s sort of all over the place… she’s the quirkiest one and just put miss-match pieces together and mixes vintage stuff with modern things… very funky… very creative.".

== Novels ==
Aria is one of four primary protagonists in all fourteen of the Pretty Little Liars novels, starting with 2006's Pretty Little Liars. She is the daughter of Byron and Ella Montgomery and has a younger brother, Mike.

=== Before Pretty Little Liars ===
Before Alison DiLaurentis disappeared, Aria is shown to have a quirky personality and a penchant for knitting. She is best friends with Alison 'Ali' DiLaurentis along with Hanna Marin, Spencer Hastings, and Emily Fields. Like the other girls, Aria and Alison had a secret between them; they witnessed Aria's father, Byron, cheating on her mother with one of his students, Meredith, and he begs Aria not to tell anyone. During the night of the last of 7th grade, while having a sleepover in Spencer's sister Melissa's barn, Alison disappeared. Not long after Ali's disappearance, Aria's father moves his family to Iceland in an attempt to hide the affair from Aria's mother, Ella.

=== Pretty Little Liars ===
In the first novel, Aria and her family return from Iceland, moving back into their old house in Rosewood, Pennsylvania. She, Hanna, Spencer, and Emily have grown apart since Alison's disappearance. Since the three year jump, Aria has now blossomed into a beautiful and confident young woman. She meets Ezra Fitz at a local bar and they connect; hooking up in the girls bathroom. She later finds that after all her time in Iceland, formerly overweight Hanna is now thin, glamorous, and best friends with former nerdy outcast, Mona Vanderwaal. When she begins school she finds that Ezra is also her new AP English teacher. Aria later begins to receive texts and emails from an unknown source that reveals secrets that only Ali knew and more recent ones, including Byron's affair with Meredith and Aria's with Ezra, signed, "A". When Alison's body is discovered under a block of cement, she, along with the other three girls, receive a text at the memorial service, "I'm still here bitches, and I know everything." signed, "A".

=== Flawless ===
The unknown identity of "A", and suspicions that Byron may be seeing Meredith again, cause Aria to feel uncertain about her future. She goes to Meredith's yoga class after receiving the address from "A". Which causes her to feel worse about keeping her father's affair a secret. After almost getting herself into a car accident, she runs into Hanna's ex-boyfriend Sean Ackard. He goes with her to confront Meredith, who bluntly says that she and Byron are in love, and nothing will break them up. Sean and Aria's relationship turns romantic, and they go to the local Foxy benefit. When Aria returns home, she discovers that "A" sent her mother a letter detailing her father's affair, and the fact that Aria knew all about it.

== Television ==
=== Season 1 ===
The series begins with a flashback in a barn where four girls Aria, Hanna, Spencer, and Emily are having a sleepover; they are surprised by their best friend and queen bee Alison DiLaurentis, who frightens them by causing creaking noises outside the barn as a practical joke. The five girls gossip and share secrets before falling asleep. When they awake, they realize that two of the girls are gone, Spencer and Ali. They run into Spencer, who tells them Ali is missing and that she heard a scream.

One year later, Aria and her family have returned home to Rosewood after a year of living in Iceland. Aria still feels troubled over her best friend's disappearance, which concerns both her parents who encourage her to reconnect with her old friends. However, Aria sees through her dad's concerns and reassures him that she is still keeping his secret. She drops her brother off at lacrosse and stops off at a Bar and Grill, where she meets a man named Ezra, who mistakes her for a college girl and informs her that he will soon be starting a new teaching post. The two feel an instant connection and end up hooking up in the bathrooms.

In a conversation with her father, we see flashbacks of Aria and Alison catching her dad making out with another woman in the back of his car. Aria begins to reunite with her old friends, mainly Emily, at school and discovers that Ezra is in fact her new English teacher, Mr Fitz. After an awkward moment, Aria receives a text message from an unknown “A” which reads "Aria: Maybe he fools around with students all the time. A lot of teachers do. Just ask your dad. -A". Aria attempts to continue her relationship with Mr Fitz, but he rejects her telling her everything has changed. However, they rekindle their romance at Ali's funeral, which is held after her body is discovered under the DiLaurentis' gazebo, which was being ready to build right before her disappearance. After one kiss, however, Aria leaves Ezra. Aria meets up with Emily and in turn Hanna and Spencer at the funeral, and they reveal that each have received a message from the mysterious A. The police now reveal that the girls need questioning again as they are now looking at a murder case, before they each receive a text. "I'm still here, bitches. And I know everything. -A".

Aria and her friends continue to be tormented by the anonymous “A”, who seems to know all the secrets they told Ali, including the secret surrounding a mysterious blind girl named Jenna Marshall. When Jenna joins them at their lunch table, her presence triggers a flashback to the night of the unknown “Jenna Thing”. The four girls and Alison were having a sleepover and trying on each other's clothes when Alison claimed to have seen Toby Cavanaugh spying on them through her window. To get revenge, Alison and the girls plant a stink bomb in his house. However, it caused the garage to explode, presumably causing Jenna to lose her sight, a fact that Jenna seems determined to hang over their heads.

Aria continues her illicit affair with Ezra, while trying to come to terms with her father's own affair. “A” continues to taunt the girls in every aspect of their lives. They try to block them out of their lives by putting blockers on their e-mail accounts and their cell phones, but “A” appears to be too smart, even breaking into Spencer's house and ends up sending a detailed letter to Aria's mother, Ella, telling of her husband's affair, which leaves Ella devastated, and Aria guilty for keeping it from her.

A meeting with Hardy, an old college friend of Ezra's, as well as an untimely message from “A”, brings home to Ezra the reality of his relationship with Aria and he eventually ends it at their school homecoming leaving Aria heartbroken. After which he leaves Rosewood, and Aria discovers he has gone to New York to look for another job. Aria must attempt to move on from the breakup with Ezra.

Aria's parents argue and eventually separate over her father's affair, with her mom moving out of the house and into an apartment above her art gallery. Noel Khan, a boy Aria used to have a crush on, asks her out. She declines at first, but eventually accepts when the school's SATs are cancelled and they have to take shelter due to a hurricane warning in which Ezra makes his return and tells Aria that she was all he thought about."I thought about you every second I was gone. But I also thought about the consequences." At Mona's “glamping” party, Ezra texts Aria to meet him near the party in his car. She does so and the two eventually end up kissing, this is spotted by Hanna, who has been surveying the area with binoculars, in an attempt to spot who “A” is. She apparently does, but before she can tell others, Hanna is hit by a car, and Aria reads a text from “A” who tells the remaining girls that “She knew too much. -A”.

In the second half of the first season, Aria realizes that Noel knows about her and Ezra's relationship and was the one who wrote I See You on the back of Ezra's car. She also tells Emily, Hanna, and Spencer about her affair with Ezra. Spencer takes her to a tree that has Alison + Ian carved on it, but someone had cut it down. She was also present when Melissa and Ian announce to Spencer that they got married. Ezra and Aria's relationship continues and Aria tells Ezra the truth about "The Jenna Thing." Aria finds out that Ezra was once engaged and his ex-fiancée was the one who ended it. Byron offers Ezra a job at Hollis and Ezra takes it after realizing that he and Aria can have a normal boyfriend and girlfriend relationship. Aria finds out that Ezra's ex-fiancée is also working at Hollis and that Ezra knew but didn't tell her about it.

=== Season 2 ===
In the beginning of season two Aria's relationship with Ezra is on the verge of ending due to the revelation of his ex-fiancée, Jackie, working at the same college as him. Ezra clearly wants nothing more than to be with Aria and tries to show her that she is the only girl he's interested in. On his last day working at Rosewood, Ezra is packing up his belongings in his car when Aria runs and kisses him. She realizes that her and Ezra are meant to be together and that she loves him no matter what.

Aria and Ezra can now legally date since Ezra is no longer Aria's teacher, but they still face challenges in their relationship. They must find a way to tell their friends (except for Spencer, Hanna, and Emily, who already know) about their relationship. When Jason, Ali's older brother, returns to Rosewood, the girls suspect he is up to something nefarious. However, Aria ends up talking to Jason more after he promises not to tell the police about her brother Mike breaking into his house. Mike continues to break into houses and gets arrested, but is released when Aria's parents come to pick him up at the station. Mike becomes depressed and stays in his room, doing unknown activities, and Aria tries to help him but is unsuccessful. Aria finds herself thinking about Jason more and even has inappropriate dreams about him. She eventually tells Emily about these dreams, and Emily says that dreaming about someone means that the dreamer wants something from that person, not the other way around.

In the ninth episode, "Picture This", Jason kisses Aria and she doesn't exactly stop him. But she does tell him she's not available and walks away confused. Aria confides in Emily about her random relationship with Jason. Emily tells her that she needs to stay away from him and reminds her that she has Ezra, who she truly loves. Despite her feelings for Jason, Aria agrees and stays with Ezra.

At the college fair, Aria admits to Ezra that Jason kissed her and she didn't stop him. This leaves Ezra in shock but he isn't completely angry at Aria.

Spencer gets Emily to help her find out more about Jason and possibly his motives for coming back to Rosewood. They break into Jason's shed and find a red room full of pictures of Aria sleeping. They warn Aria about what they saw and she seems completely freaked out. Aria later confronts Jason about the photos of her and he claims that they were Ali's, so he wanted to develop them. Aria believes him, but is still unsure about his motives. She sees Jason at a restaurant and they begin to talk about what else Jason found of Ali's. Spencer and Toby see the two of them talking after Spencer and Emily both warned her about him, so Spencer decides that there is only one person Aria would listen to—Ezra. Spencer jumps into Ezra's car and Ezra looks shocked. Spencer tells him that she knows about him and Aria and that Aria is in danger. Ezra finds Aria in Jason's front yard and tells her that he doesn't want to lose her. He says he's ready to tell everyone about the two of them and Aria seems relieved and happy. When Jason comes back, he sees Aria and Ezra kissing. Aria tells him she has to go and Jason realizes Ezra is the reason why Aria is "unavailable". He lets her go and Aria rides away with Ezra. Later that night, Ella confronts Aria about rumors a while back about Ezra possibly having a relationship with one of his students. Aria seems shocked and doesn't know where her mom is going with it. Ella then tells her that she saw Spencer and Ezra in Mr. Fitz's car together, but Aria reassures her that they aren't seeing each other. Ella tells Aria that she would be devastated if she found out he was having a relationship with one of his students, but takes it back and says she would actually feel betrayed. This discourages Aria and makes her feel like maybe Ezra and her can't go public after all.

In the twelfth episode "Over My Dead Body", the liars receive a large box with chucky dolls inside. A tells them that if they don't do everything the dolls want them to do by 7pm, Dr Sullivan dies. Aria's chucky doll says that she must get Jackie to leave Hollis. She receives Jackie's paper which is about to get published and another paper identical to Jackie's. Jackie plagiarized her paper. When Aria attempts to do what A tells her to, Jackie tells her that she will not be leaving Hollis, but Aria will leave Ezra.

When Aria is arrested, Ezra comes to the police station and confesses to Ella that he loves her. Ella thinks Ezra is talking about Spencer and tells him that the Hastings parents will ruin him if they find out about the relationship. Aria breaks up with Ezra, but after one month, they meet in downtown Rosewood by accident. Aria later stops by his office to return a book, and Jackie comes in and tells her to stay away from him. Ezra walks in during their conversation, and Jackie leaves. Ezra tells Aria that they need to tell Aria's parents about what's been happening. When they do, Ella and Byron are extremely angry, and Mike punches Ezra, leaving Ezra with a bleeding lip. Ezra returns to his office where he talks with Jackie, and tells her that he is extremely angry with her.

A few days after that, Aria's dad, Byron, goes to Ezra's apartment and threatens him, saying that if Ezra will see Aria again, Byron will hand him over to the police. After that, Ezra stops answering Aria's phone calls, texts and E-mails. But Aria doesn't give up on him that easily. Aria is having a "date" with Holden, a childhood friend, but actually she is taking Holden to a play that she knows Ezra will go to. Holden understands she just wanted to see Ezra, he says he'll help her meet him, in return for her helping him with his secret, which is martial arts. After a few days, Aria leaves Ezra a message saying she'll be in front of the clock in Philadelphia and if he comes, it means they still have a chance. After he hears that message he decides to meet her at the clock, thus continuing their relationship in secrecy again. It is revealed in the next episode that no one but Holden knows about the rekindled romance and after a few days Aria also tells her friends about her relationship after being threatened by A . They continue seeing each other on Aria's "dates" with Holden, nearly being caught by Byron once. After he is fired, he tells Aria that he can't teach in that town anymore and must find a place where he can before they can start dating again. Ezra leaves Rosewood, but Aria keeps in touch with him.

In the final episode of Season 2, "unmAsked", Aria is at the masquerade ball. Ezra comes to and they reconcile, with Ezra telling her he wants to have his first dance with Aria, as a couple.

=== Season 3 ===
Season 3 picks up five months after the liars discovered that Mona was A. It starts at a party at Spencer's where they discuss what they did in the summer.

Near the beginning of the season Aria meets Ezra's mother and younger brother Wesley Fitzgerald-who Aria shares a brief kiss with, (Gregg Sulkin). Wesley tells Aria about a girl called Maggie, (Larisa Oleynik) that Ezra got pregnant when he was younger. Wesley accidentally lets it slip after finding out his mother tried to pay Aria to "disappear" from her son's life, which is what she did to Maggie as she thought she ruined Ezra's life. Just before the mid-season finale of season 3, Aria discovers that Ezra has a son that he is unaware of with a woman named Maggie. Ezra always assumed Maggie got an abortion. Maggie asked Aria to keep it a secret.

In the Halloween episode Aria is kidnapped by A and nearly killed after being locked in a box with a dead Garrett Reynolds (Yani Gellman) and nearly being pushed out of a moving train onto the track, luckily Hanna, Spencer and Emily come to the rescue. After, Spencer accidentally tells Ezra about Maggie and that he has a 7-year-old son. Ezra leaves town and Wes and Aria develop a closer relationship. In Aria's bedroom, Wes kisses her before she tells him that they can't do this and he states that they can't and leaves.

Then Ezra comes back and Aria finds out that he isn't coming alone. Maggie and Malcom - his seven-year-old son - came along with him. Aria tries to cope with the fact that Ezra has a family now and their relationship has changed. Things become worse when Ezra decides to get back to teaching as he now has more responsibilities. Rosewood high rehires Ezra as an English teacher and Aria starts questioning her relationship with Ezra, especially after the headmaster asks her whether she is 'seeing' Ezra occasionally or not. Finally Aria feels she is not a part of Ezra's life anymore and she decides to break up with Ezra.

In the last episode of Season 3, "A Dangerous Game", the liars get trapped in a burning lodge with Mona Vanderwaal, who was formerly A. According to Hanna Marin and Mona Vanderwaal, it was Alison DiLaurentis who pulled them out.

=== Season 4 ===
After breaking up with her boyfriend Ezra, Aria looks for ways to move on. She nearly gets hit by a car and decides to take up karate, where she meets a cute instructor named Jake and starts developing feelings for him. However, at the end of an episode, Jake is shown with punching bags and falls to the ground when someone puts knives in his punching bags. Aria also keeps an eye on her younger brother Mike, who starts dating Mona Vanderwaal, a person who bullied Aria in junior high. Mike gets upset with Aria and says that if she can forgive their dad, she should be able to forgive Mona. Aria's friends start to suspect Ezra is "A," the person who has been threatening and harassing them, but Aria disagrees and gets angry with them. However, Aria later discovers that Ezra knew her before they started dating and feels betrayed and used. The girls eventually receive a message from Alison, who reveals that she is alive and wants to tell them the truth. They go to New York and meet with Alison, who tells them that Ezra dated her before he met Aria. When "A" contacts the girls, they run to the top of a building and tell Alison that they think Jessica DiLaurentis is "A." Ezra shows up and protects the girls by taking a bullet for them.

=== Season 5 ===
In Season 5, Aria and Ezra try to heal their relationship after he is shot by Shana in New York City. She kisses him and they have sex in Miss Me x 100 and decide to try and see where their relationship takes them. After Mona's "death" and Alison's arrest, Aria and Ezra both try to talk to Mike about her death, and Aria is shocked when he tells her that Mona faked her own death to catch 'A', but he believes that 'A' must have blackmailed her, which is why she hasn't returned. Aria and the other liars try to get Alison out of prison, but when Hanna is also arrested and evidence against them makes it look like they also committed the murder, things start to look down and Aria and the others are arrested for Mona's murder. A kidnaps them on their way to a prison in the Season 5 finale and traps them in his dollhouse, but the girls outsmart him, find Mona, and try to escape. But when they go outside, they find themselves where they were at the beginning: prisoners.

=== Season 6 ===
In Season 6, Aria escapes A's dollhouse with the other liars, but is emotionally scarred from being tortured by Charles in the dollhouse. When she returns from the hospital, she finds out Andrew is suspected of kidnapping the girls, leading Aria to lie to the police by telling them that she saw Andrew's face in the dollhouse. After Andrew is found out not to be 'A', Aria must respond to the lies she told to the police, and deal with an extremely angry Andrew. Aria soon has flashbacks of herself in the dollhouse, one being when A forced her to cut and dye her hair. She finds the color applicator in the Hollis College's darkroom, which leads her to befriending a fellow photographer, Clark, and they soon become quick friends. Clark and Aria exchange photographs, and Aria reveals the pictures of the dolls in her bedroom. Once Aria leaves, she goes home to examine her photographs further, until she is interrupted by Byron. Finally, Aria opens up to her father about her experiences in the dollhouse and she finishes her story in tears. After overcoming many obstacles, "A" is revealed to be CeCe Drake and Aria leaves Rosewood to go to school in Savannah.

Five years after breaking up with Ezra, Aria is living in Boston and in a relationship with Liam, a co-worker at a publishing house. When Charlotte is killed, Aria must return to Rosewood and confront her past. Ezra has become isolated and depressed since the disappearance of his girlfriend Nicole, and is struggling to write a sequel to his best-selling book. Alison suspects that Aria had something to do with Charlotte's murder and a security tape emerges that could make Aria a suspect. The girls try to protect Aria by erasing the tape, but this only causes more problems. Aria begins to wonder if Ezra and Byron had a hand in Charlotte's murder, but eventually realizes she is mistaken. As the stalker's game becomes more dangerous, Aria is injured in a fire and ends up in the hospital. During this difficult time, Ezra supports Aria and she starts helping him write his book as he comes to terms with Nicole's loss. Aria's boss approves her as an author and in the spring finale, Ezra tells Aria that her boss loved the entire book. Aria then cheats on Liam by sleeping with Ezra.

=== Season 7 ===
In Along Comes Mary, Ezra proposes to Aria who says she needs to think about it because of her part in the Rollins accidental murder when he is hit by Hanna Marin's car. However at the end of the Wanted: Dead or Alive, Ezra re-proposes when Aria tells him everything and she says yes. Of course with some help earlier from Hanna who says she and Ezra are just meant to be. Aria and Ezra plan to elope, but their plans are cancelled when Nicole is found alive. Aria and the Liars are then attacked by Noel and Jenna, the latter of whom is in league with Uber A and Spencer ends up being shot by Uber A.

In Power Play, Aria is contacted by "A.D." via video chat. They tell her they have her file from Jessica DiLaurentis and it contains a secret that would make Ezra choose Nicole over her. They later tell her to meet them and she goes to do so. She stumbles upon their limo at the location and the door opens. She steps inside and sees "A.D." sitting there. They reveal themselves as Sydney Driscoll, who claims to have shot Spencer and rescued Jenna from the blind school. Sydney offers Aria the chance to join the A-Team, and Aria realizes that Sydney has an earpiece in her ear, meaning that the driver is the real "A.D." and Aria confronts her. Sydney says that leaving Alison and coming to meet them was the first step towards Aria earning "A.D.'s" trust, but she still has a long way to go. "A.D." later texts Aria and asks her if she has made a decision yet.

In In the Eye Abides the Heart, Aria begins to work for "A.D." and gives them information about the Liars' discoveries. She later steals Lucas and Charlotte's comic book and hands it over to "A.D.", in exchange for a black A-Team hoodie.

In The Glove That Rocks the Cradle, Aria continues to work as the helper to "A.D." and eventually puts on the black hoodie and breaks into Alison's house as "A.D." on their behalf. She trashes the room and breaks the toys, leaving the "A" dolls hanging above the crib and slinging blood onto the side of it. Alison and Emily return home and Aria barely manages to escape. The Liars find the crib and deduce that "A.D." definitely has a helper, while Spencer finds Aria's earring in the room.

In Driving Miss Crazy, Aria's work as "A.D." helper continues when they send her to the Hastings residence to deliver a phone with a message that will play through their Bluetooth speakers. She later breaks into Alison's in her "A" uniform to retrieve her file and leave a puzzle piece on the board.

In Choose or Lose, Aria shreds the file, as her apartment is raided by the police, who have a search warrant. Her phone is confiscated but "A.D." gives her a new phone to collaborate with them on. They give her instructions to meet them in her "A" uniform and Mona overhears. She informs that others that she thinks Aria is on the "A.D."-Team and explains her theory about Aria being the one responsible for trashing the nursery and leaving the recording behind for "A.D." at Spencer's. Aria suits up her uniform and goes to meet with "A.D." and they tell her she looks good in the uniform. She hears a noise and follows it, only for the Liars catch her in the uniform. The Liars are furious with her for collaborating with "A.D." against them and force to walk back to the police station on her own. However, Aria's name is cleared, when "A.D." gifts her an alibi, in exchange for assistance. Aria later declares she is leaving the A-Team.

In "Till Death Do Us Part", it has been one year since the last episode, we first see Aria and Ezra on the set of a film studio where their book is being made into a movie. Before her wedding to Ezra, Aria finds out that she will not be able to have children making her believe she can no longer get married since Ezra wants a family. When she shares the unfortunate news with Ezra he consoles her and tells her that they have other options and confirms that he still loves her and wants to get married. After their rehearsal dinner at the Radley, Ezra begins discussing getting other opinions from fertility specialists. After Aria claims that she has already seen other fertility doctors Ezra becomes upset wondering why she did not tell him about the sooner. After telling him that she wanted to make sure she couldn't have children on her own before telling him he becomes upset asking her if he has so much trust in her why does she not have the same trust in him. Aria tells Ezra she loves him, he tells her he loves her too, but it is not the same as trusting him and he leaves. The next day Aria and the girls are in her dressing room when she comes out in her gown excited and ready to marry Ezra, however he does not show and sends her a text saying that he can not go through with the wedding. What Aria doesn't know is that Ezra has been captured by A.D. as has Spencer whose place has been taken by A.D (Alex Drake, Spencer's evil twin sister). When Toby realizes that "Spencer" (A.D posing as Spencer) is not the real Spencer, with the help from Jenna, he lets the other girls and Caleb know. With the help of Mona, who has only been pretending to be on A.D's side tells them the location of A.D.'s lair they rescue Ezra and Spencer. The next day Aria and Ezra happily get married. While the girls are saying goodbye, Aria shares her and Ezra's plans for their honeymoon as well as their plans to look at adoption agencies when they return.

==== Pretty Little Liars: The Perfectionists ====
After the second episode it was revealed that Aria and Ezra adopted a baby girl who they named Katherine Ella. It was also revealed that Aria's first book will turn into a movie which will feature Reese Witherspoon.

==== Pretty Little Liars (2022) ====
In the episode "Chapter Ten: Final Girls", when Tabby Haworthe asks Imogen Adams if she wants her to accompany her to Rosewood to deliver her baby to her new family, Imogen mentions that if she wishes and that those who will adopt her baby are writers named Aria and Ezra. She also mentions that she is happy with them because they will allow her to keep in touch with the baby.

In "Chapter Eleven: SpookySpaghetti.com", it is revealed, Imogen changed her mind about letting Aria and Ezra adopt her daughter because she got a "weird vibe" from Ezra.

In "Chapter Fifteen: Friday the 13th", Tabby and Imogen break into Dr. Sullivan's office and go through the private practice files, finding some on Aria, Spencer Hastings, Emily Fields and Hanna Marin.

== Reception ==
Lucy Hale's character Aria received mixed to negative reception from fans. Most notably, Aria is acknowledged for having a unique fashion sense that piqued the interest of many fans. However, many viewers have expressed dislike for the character for being the most selfish out of the other Liars, and often acting without regard for others.

Her romantic teacher-student relationship with Ezra Fitz was controversial throughout the series, especially due to it being romanticized and rarely addressed as problematic in the show. Many critics have panned the representation of Aria as an equal in the relationship, with reviewers stating that she was a victim of statutory rape all throughout the series.
