= Of Late I Think of Rosewood =

- Pretty Little Liars episode
- Hanna, Emily Aria and Spencer meeting
- Episode no.: Season 6 Episode 11
- Directed by: Ron Lagomarsino
- Written by: Joseph Dougherty
- Original air date: January 12, 2016
- Running time: 42 minutes

Guest appearances
- Vanessa Ray as Charlotte DiLaurentis; Huw Collins as Elliott Rollins; Dre Davis as Sara Harvey; Keegan Allen as Toby Cavanaugh; Lesley Fera as Veronica Hastings; Nia Peeples as Pam Fields; Chad Lowe as Byron Montgomery; Travis Winfrey as Lorenzo Calderon

Episode chronology
← Previous "Game Over, Charles"	Next → "Charlotte's Web"
- Pretty Little Liars season 6

"Of Late I Think of Rosewood" is the eleventh episode of the sixth season and the 131st episode overall of the Freeform mystery drama television series Pretty Little Liars. The episode, serving as the sixth season mid-season premiere, was broadcast on January 12, 2016. It was written by Joseph Dougherty, and directed by Ron Lagomarsino. The episode takes place five years after the events of "Game Over, Charles" as the Liars have graduated from high school and college. The episode included a new intro for the show, after using the same intro since the show premiered.

== Plot ==
In 2017, five years after the events of the previous episode, the protagonists have all gone their separate ways. Spencer Hastings (Troian Bellisario) is living in Washington D.C. working with lobbyists and has since become close to Caleb Rivers (Tyler Blackburn) since she broke up with her high school sweetheart Toby Cavanaugh (Keegan Allen), who has since become serious with his carpentry business. Hanna Marin (Ashley Benson) is working for a fashion line based in New York City and travels frequently, and is engaged to a man named Jordan. Aria Montgomery (Lucy Hale) is working for a publishing house in Boston and is dating a co-worker named Liam. Ezra Fitz (Ian Harding) has become withdrawn since the publication of his first novel, Ostinato; after a trip to build houses in South America with his girlfriend, Nicole, he goes awry when the group they are working with is targeted by revolutionists and fifteen people, including Nicole, are either missing or dead. Emily Fields (Shay Mitchell) is working as a barista in San Diego; after her father was killed in the military, she had dropped out of college and has been lying to her friends and family that she is still at Pepperdine University and is working at the Salk Institute. Alison DiLaurentis (Sasha Pieterse) is a high school teacher in Rosewood and is petitioning to have her sister Charlotte DiLaurentis (Vanessa Ray) — the former antagonist that had tormented the girls as "A" for years — released from the hospital she has been living in for the past years. The court has requested that the victims of Charlotte testify in front of a judge that they are no longer afraid of Charlotte, forcing the girls to return to Rosewood.

Hanna's mother, Ashley Marin (Laura Leighton), has turned Radley Sanitarium into a fashionably posh hotel, while Spencer's mother, Veronica Hastings (Lesley Fera), is running for Senate. Alison successfully convinces the girls to testify in front of the court, but they are still hesitant at seeing their old tormentor released. Alison and Charlotte's brother, Jason, does not agree with having Charlotte released, deciding not to be in Rosewood during the time of the hearing. At the hearing, another one of Charlotte's victims, Mona Vanderwaal (Janel Parrish), shows up, insisting that she needs to be there. Emily, Spencer, and Hanna all testify that they are not afraid of Charlotte, but Aria, remembering her time in the dollhouse, is unable to do so and, much to the chagrin of Charlotte's doctor, tells the judge she is still afraid of Charlotte. Mona has a similar breakdown, but for different reasons; she says she knows what it is like to spend time in Radley and says Charlotte deserves to have a real home. Breaking down, Mona leaves without saying anything to the other girls.

The judge rules in favor of Charlotte's release and Alison prepares a welcome home dinner for her, while the girls crash in Hanna's suite at the hotel. After getting wasted, they all fall asleep, but are woken the next morning by a frantic call from Alison, who says that she can not find Charlotte anywhere. Soon after, police officers Toby and Lorenzo Calderon (Travis Winfrey) discover Charlotte dead outside of the church, looking like she jumped from the bell tower. At the funeral, the girls are startled by the surprising appearance of Sara Harvey (Dre Davis), one of Charlotte's former accomplices who supposedly garnered amnesia and severe nerve injuries after Emily hit her in the head and a bomb went off the night Charlotte was discovered. After the funeral, Lorenzo approaches the girls, telling them that Charlotte was already dead before she jumped and that the police are ruling it a homicide, warning them that they will be questioned. Realizing they have to stay in Rosewood for longer than expected, Hanna says, "I want to go home," to which Spencer replies, "We are home."

== Title reference ==
"Of Late I Think of Rosewood" references the fourth-season episode "Of Late I Think of Cliffordville" of the American television anthology series The Twilight Zone which originally aired on April 11, 1963, on CBS.

== Production ==
"Of Late I Think of Rosewood" will be directed by Ron Lagomarsino and written by executive producer Joseph Dougherty, which will serve as Dougherty's third writing credit of the sixth season. The title was revealed by actress Nia Peeples on Instagram. The table read for the mid-season premiere was on June 16, 2015. Filming began shortly afterwards on June 19, 2015, and ended on June 26, 2015. Troian Bellisario revealed on Twitter that the crew filmed the longest take of the series, lasting 24 minutes, in the episode. The episode will include a new intro to the show, as it will be showing the characters after the five-year time jump.

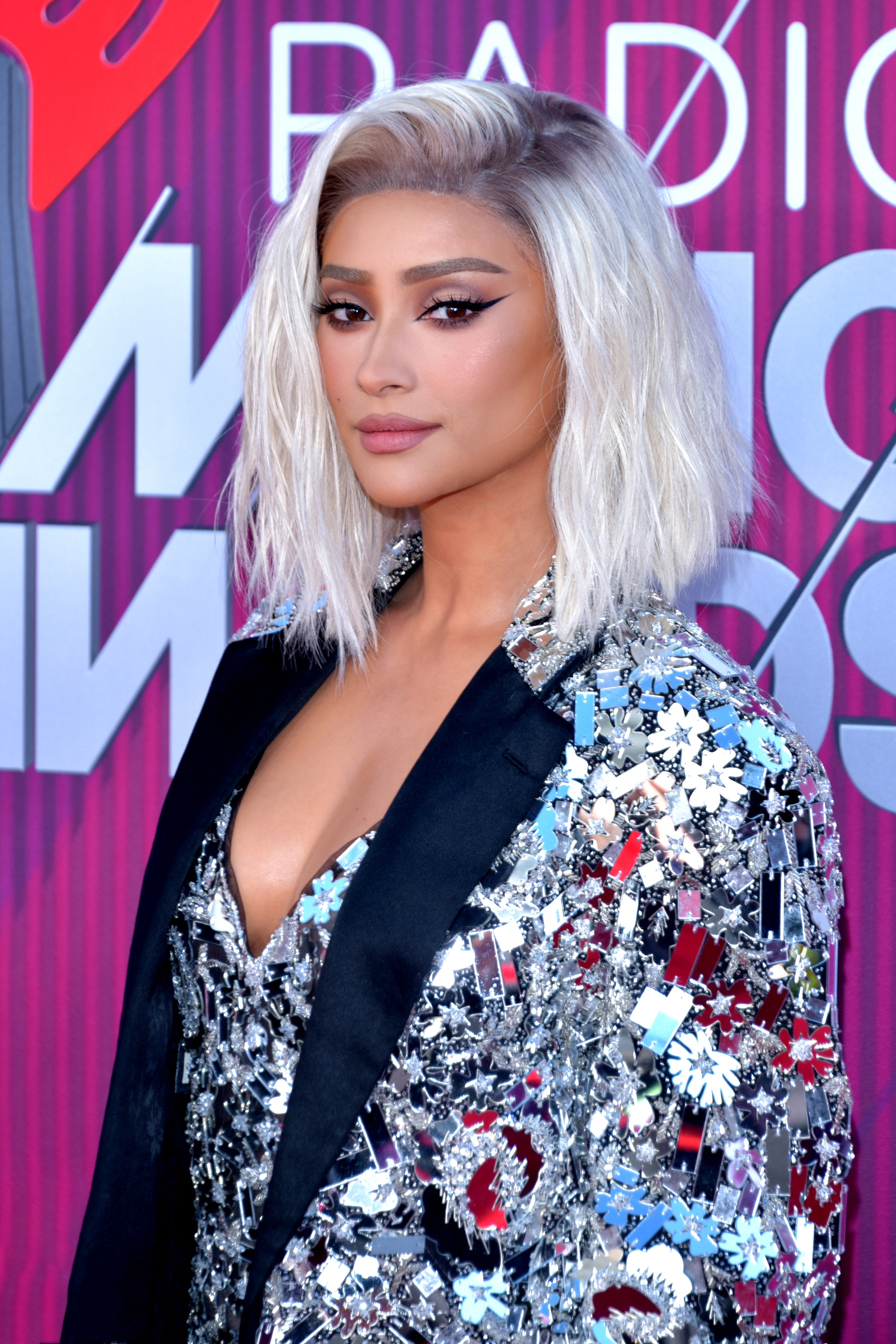
Shay Mitchell who plays Emily Fields closer to her age.

The episode will feature a five-year time-jump to after the Liars have been attending college as it was confirmed by showrunner I. Marlene King in an interview with E! News. King expressed her excitement in an interview with Entertainment Tonight to tell more grown-up stories for the characters as she said that the actresses had "outgrown the teenager years". King commented on the time pace as she said "Time was moving very slowly in Rosewood and we were ready to speed it up." Executive producer Oliver Goldstick revealed in an interview with Entertainment Tonight that the time-jump will include a wedding for one of the Liars. Lucy Hale commented on the five-year time jump as she said “We couldn’t have asked for anything better". Shay Mitchell also commented on how the show is going to be different as she said "It’s going to be like a brand-new show and it’ll be nice to give our fans a show that they already know and characters they already love, but now the girls are just as old as our fans who are watching it. This feels like a new beginning.”

King confirmed to TVLine that the time-jump had been planned a long time ago as she said "We’ve been talking about [the time jump] for years. This is the same group of writers who have been here since Day 1, so a lot of the ideas that have been bandied about, even two or three years ago, are just now coming to fruition." Goldstick said in regards to the threats by 'A' and the time jump, that “It gives us an opportunity to see what was the gift of ‘A.’ What was the gift of ‘A’ that edified all of these girls in different ways?” He continued talking about the Liars' evolvement as he said -

If you look back, they were mushy in the first season — they weren’t fully formed or completely confident and still getting their sea legs about their identity. Now you get the pleasure of paying that off five years later. Did they sublimate this experience? Did they talk about it with other people and say, ‘This is what I went through during my high school years,’ and everyone in the dorm room said, ‘You’re full of shit’?” - Oliver Goldstick to BuzzFeed

In an interview with Entertainment Weekly, King revealed that the Liars would be one year out of college as she said "We made that decision so they would have a year to finish school and firmly root themselves into their desired careers, so their wardrobe and hair and makeup and styles reflect where they are professionally in their lives". She confirmed that the girls have lived a free life for the last five years, with no torture or tormenting by an anonymous cyber bully, but still experience post-traumatic stress at times.

== Reception ==
=== Broadcasting ===
"Of Late I Think of Rosewood" was broadcast on January 12, 2016, on Freeform, making it the first episode to be broadcast since ABC Family rebranded to Freeform.

=== Ratings ===
The episode attracted 2.25 million views and 1.1 in the 18-49 demo, down 37% from the mid-season finale in August which had 3.09 million views and a 1.4 in the 18-49 demo.

=== Reviews ===
The episode received highly positive reviews, with many critics and fans commending' the five year time-jump as well as the show's more mature and self-assured tone.

Caroline Preece from Den of Geek said the episode "delivered on every promise it made before the time-jump, cleaning the slate whilst managing not to lose a sense of the history these characters share. I'm looking forward to what's in store, as much for how the Liars rebuild their group as for the reveals and revelations. This is a whole new show." Jay Ruymann from TV Fanatic also praised the episode and deemed it "...a refreshing restart to the mystery drama that has seen so many twists and turns over the years. It was eerily similar to the pilot of the show, but had a feeling of its own. As crazy as it sounds, it was almost the start of a fresh, new series." Writing for SpoilerTV, Gavin Hetherington also responded positively to the five year time-jump and highlighted that "this feels like the old show, but new, and it's a breath of fresh air to see these girls a little more mature."

However, the episode did spark some controversy following the decision to kill off Charlotte DiLaurentis. Samantha Vincenty from Pop Crush angrily stated that "multiple seasons of mental and physical torture from Charlotte, and we’ll never see a redemptive arc that involves her at all? That’s a bummer — but in retrospect, this show needed a death to keep the Liars in town. Who else would it have been? But still: Really?" Jeremy Rodriguez from The Young Folks was also disappointed with the character's death stating that "the show could have saved itself by having Charlotte develop as a character. To have her get murdered automatically eliminates the only transgender representation on the show and it seems like this will do more harm than good".
