= Charlotte's Web (Pretty Little Liars) =

- Pretty Little Liars episode
- Episode no.: Season 6 Episode 12
- Directed by: Joanna Kerns
- Written by: Jonell Lennon and Lijah J. Barasz
- Original air date: 19 January 2016
- Running time: 42 minutes

Guest appearances
- Lesley Fera as Veronica Hastings; Nia Peeples as Pam Fields; Dre Davis as Sara Harvey; Travis Winfrey as Lorenzo Calderon; Lulu Brud as Sabrina; Roberto Aguire as Liam Greene; David Coussins as Jordan Hobart

Episode chronology
← Previous "Of Late I Think of Rosewood"	Next → "The Gloves Are On"
- Pretty Little Liars season 6

"Charlotte's Web" is the twelfth episode of the sixth season and the 132nd episode overall of the Freeform mystery drama television series Pretty Little Liars. The episode was broadcast on 19 January 2016. It was written by Jonell Lennon and Lijah J. Barasz and directed by Joanna Kerns.

== Plot ==
As the girls overcome the shock of Charlotte's death, Alison (Sasha Pieterse) enlists Lorenzo (Travis Winfrey) to find the murderer. Aria (Lucy Hale) begins to look guilty as she returns to Boston a day earlier than she was supposed to; before she leaves, Hanna (Ashley Benson) tells her that she knows Aria left the hotel during the night when everybody else was asleep, but Aria denies it, saying she had gone to get something from her car. However, her return to Boston is short-lived; her boss at the publishing company is upset that Ezra (Ian Harding) has returned the advance on his new book and sends Aria back to Rosewood to convince him. Emily (Shay Mitchell) continues to lie about her life in California and is seen taking blood tests at a medical center. When Sabrina (Lulu Brud), the new manager of the Brew sees her, Emily tells her not to tell anybody, not giving an explanation for why she was at the medical center.

Hanna is surprised by her fiancé, Jordan (David Coussins), while Spencer (Troian Bellisario) and Caleb (Tyler Blackburn) continue a questionable, yet unromantic, relationship. Alison invites the girls over to dinner, where she implies that she believes Aria had something to do with the murder. Hanna is able to access surveillance footage of the hotel from the night Charlotte died and discovers that Aria had left the hotel with Ezra soon before Charlotte was killed. They confront Aria, who reveals that, unable to sleep, she had called Ezra, and the two had gone for a walk. They had noticed a blonde in a red jacket, who Ezra thought was Charlotte, going into the church and Ezra, obviously angry that Charlotte had been set free, said good night to Aria and sent her off in a taxi. Aria is afraid that Ezra may have done something to Charlotte out of anger. Alison calls Lorenzo, telling him she thinks her friends may have had something to do with the murder. Emily visits her father's grave, vowing to make things right, but is scared away by Sara Harvey (Dre Davis), visiting Charlotte's grave. The episode ends with an unknown person leaving the graveyard and a limo driver opening a car door while saying, "I'm sorry for your loss"

== Production ==
"Charlotte's Web" was written by Jonell Lennon and Lijah J. Barasz and directed by Joanna Kerns. Filming began on 6 July 2015 and wrapped on 14 July 2015. Lesley Fera and Tyler Blackburn confirmed their presence in this episode. Is confirmed that there will be a scene between Ezra and Aria. The episode's title and synopsis was revealed during a press conference released on 28 December 2015.

== Reception ==
=== Broadcasting ===
"Charlotte's Web" was broadcast on 19 January 2016 on Freeform.

=== Ratings ===
The episode attracted 1.66 million views and 0.8 in the 18-49 demo, down from the previous episode which had 2.25 million views and a 1.1 in the 18-49 demo.

=== Reviews ===
Caroline Preece from Den of Geek also praised the writers for setting up an intricate plot, stating that "Hanna and Caleb are able to have a conversation, but we still don't know why they aren't together. Alison is still Alison, but she's an amalgamation of the old Ali and the new, domesticated family girl. It's a balance, and so far it's been done perfectly." Writing for SpoilerTV, Gavin Hetherington particularly enjoyed the new individual storylines for the characters, describing them as the "best they've been in years...even for characters I stopped caring about ages ago."
