= Where Somebody Waits for Me =

- Pretty Little Liars episode
- Episode no.: Season 6 Episode 16
- Directed by: Joseph Dougherty
- Written by: Joseph Dougherty
- Original air date: February 16, 2016
- Running time: 42 minutes

Guest appearances
- Lesley Fera as Veronica Hastings; Huw Collins as Elliott Rollins; Roberto Aguire as Liam Greene; David Coussins as Jordan Hobart; Roma Maffia as Linda Tanner; Brandon Firla as Gil

Episode chronology
← Previous "Do Not Disturb"	Next → "We've All Got Baggage"
- Pretty Little Liars season 6

"Where Somebody Waits for Me" is the sixteenth episode of Pretty Little Liars' sixth season, and the 136th episode overall. It first aired on the Freeform network in the United States on February 16, 2016. The episode was directed and written by executive producer and frequent collaborator Joseph Dougherty. In the episode, new relationships cause confusion and tense moments. The Liars start to investigate Sara Harvey, while themselves being investigated by Detective Tanner.

Upon its initial airing, the episode yielded 1.36 million viewers and a 0.7 demo rating, up from the previous episode, and received generally mixed reviews from critics, who criticized its pacing and felt that its writing was mostly sluggish and reminiscent of the show's weakest episodes.

== Plot ==
As the girls continue to be targeted by the new 'A', they must deal with the consequences of their lies and the jeopardy they have put their loved ones in. Hanna (Ashley Benson) deals with the repercussions of quitting her job and, despite finding comfort with Jordan (David Coussins), she begins to worry that her new relationship is in danger when the new 'A' begins to hint at her to end her relationship. Spencer (Troian Bellisario) and Caleb (Tyler Blackburn) discover a file on Yvonne's phone containing Veronica's (Lesley Fera) medical records and Spencer becomes worried that her mother is keeping secrets from her regarding her health, which could possibly jeopardize her campaign.

Liam (Roberto Aguire) surprises Aria (Lucy Hale) in Rosewood and Aria admits to Liam the truth about Ezra's new book after he reveals to her the writing is too similar to her own. Alison (Sasha Pieterse) explains to Spencer that she and Elliott (Huw Collins) are more than just friends, but they cannot reveal their relationship as it would be deemed "inappropriate". Spencer confronts Mona (Janel Parrish), who tells her that she had Yvonne leave her phone on purpose because she wanted Spencer to find the file. Emily (Shay Mitchell) is devastated when she discovers that her eggs have been destroyed, as well as countless others, after a freezer "malfunctioned", but she believes that the new 'A' had something to do with it.

Detective Tanner (Roma Maffia) tells Emily she finds it suspicious that homicides only occur when the girls are in town and reveals her intentions of digging deeper into the murder of Charlotte DiLuarentis. Hanna, Emily and Aria investigate the mysterious alleyway to which the ladder in Sara's room leads to and uncover a secret passage that leads to somewhere out the back of the hotel. Ezra (Ian Harding) returns and reveals to Aria that the night of Charlotte's death, he saw Aria's parents who asked him not to tell her that they were getting close again and after a few drinks, he went home, stating his innocence. He also gives Aria the next three chapters of his book which incidentally she has already written for him. The episode ends with Spencer discovering Melissa's suitcase is broken with the missing part matching the description of the alleged murder weapon.

== Production ==
"Where Somebody Waits for Me" was written and directed by Joseph Dougherty. The title of the episode was revealed by Lisa Cochran-Neilan on August 15, 2015, through Instagram. Filming began on August 11, 2015, and wrapped on August 19, 2015. Some stills and the official synopsis of the episode were released on January 26, 2016.

== Reception ==
=== Ratings ===
"Where Somebody Waits for Me" premiered on February 16, 2016 on Freeform to an audience of 1.36 million views, up from the previous episode, which had 1.22 million views. The episode garnered a 0.7 in the adults 18-49 demographic, also up from the previous episode, which had a 0.6 in the 18-49 demo.

=== Reviews ===
Jeremy Rodriguez from The Young Folks panned the episode and went on to say that "a better title would have been “Where Somebody Waits for Me to Become the Show People Fell In Love With Six Years Ago.” Paul Dailly from TV Fanatic echoed the same sentiments and described it as a "terrible installment of this Freeform drama." He continued to say that "it feels like we are building towards some sort of conclusion, and it probably won't be a satisfying one." Gavin Hetherington of SpoilerTV noted the building tension, but still criticised the episode for its pace, saying "we are still finding ourselves in a bit of a little liar limbo - the episodes are good, but they're not pushing past it, and only remain good. I want excellent.". He did praise several moments, such as Tanner's return and Caleb's confrontation to Mona. Isabella Biedenharn from Entertainment Weekly was just as disappointed with its pacing, calling it a "a slow episode. Evil Emoji seems to have overreacted a bit on the egg front, there’s a new potential murder weapon (which seems less scary than a golf club, but okay), and the lovemaking between the ladies and their fellas continues to scream, “They’re not in high school anymore, remember?!” Mark Trammell, a writer for "TV Equals", thought while the episode had its moments such as, "Tanner wreaking havoc on the girls’ lives yet again", proclaimed that the episode "on the whole, it was all kind of meh." Caroline Preece from Den of Geek defended the episode, stating how " this a set-up season, and it's got a huge amount to do in a short space of time. I'm cutting it some slack but, as ever, enjoying the ride all the same."
