= Pretty Little Liars season 6 =

Pretty Little Liars
- Season 6
- Season 6 DVD cover
- Showrunner: I. Marlene King
- Starring: Troian Bellisario; Ashley Benson; Tyler Blackburn; Lucy Hale; Ian Harding; Laura Leighton; Shay Mitchell; Janel Parrish; Sasha Pieterse
- No. of episodes: 20

Release
- Original network: ABC Family/Freeform
- Original release: June 2, 2015 – March 15, 2016

Season chronology
- ← Previous; Season 5 Next → Season 7

The sixth season of the American mystery drama television series Pretty Little Liars, based on the books of the same name by Sara Shepard, was renewed on June 10, 2014, for two additional seasons, making the show ABC Family's longest running original series.

The sixth season consisted of 20 episodes. It aired 10 episodes for the first half the season, which began airing on June 2, 2015. Filming for the sixth season began on March 24, 2015, which was confirmed by showrunner I. Marlene King on Twitter. The season premiere was written by I. Marlene King and Lijah J. Barasz and was directed by Chad Lowe. The title of the premiere, "Game On, Charles", was revealed by King after the fifth-season finale. It was previously said that the sixth season will not include a special holiday-themed episode between the first and second half of the season, which aired on January 12, 2016, however on October 9, 2015 at New York Comic Con it was announced that there would be a behind-the-scenes special. Previous holiday-themed episodes have been the thirteenth episode of each previous season excluding the first season.

ABC Family promoted the sixth season by creating an online contest in which fans of the show could be a part of the marketing campaign to promote the show by sending in their art for consideration. The promotional poster was released on May 21, 2015 which was included in the June/July cover of Seventeen. For the second part of the season, ABC Family released a promotional poster on December 15, 2015, with the new-launched name for the network, "Freeform".

== Overview ==
After trying to escape the dollhouse in the season five finale, Charles punishes Emily, Hanna, Spencer, Aria, and Mona, subjecting them to various types of torture while Alison, Ezra, Caleb, and Toby try to find a way to help find the girls. Andrew becomes a suspect after being reported missing. Realizing what Charles is planning to do with Alison, the Liars hatch a plan to get out of the dollhouse by setting his vault on fire. The plan worked successfully, and the girls get out of the dollhouse where they are met by Alison, Ezra, Caleb, Toby, and the police. Andrew is arrested and accused of kidnapping the girls. However, the girls are far from okay, as they all suffer from PTSD from their time in captivity. Another girl, Sara Harvey, who went missing the same time Ali did, is found in the dollhouse, reportedly having been held there for two years. Unable to deal with her home life, she runs away and stays with Emily for a while. Meanwhile, Ali tries to get answers out of her dad about Charles DiLaurentis, but he insists there is no one of that name in their family; however, Jason remembers Charles as his imaginary friend when he was a kid. Later, Andrew is released from police custody because of lack of evidence, and the Liars realize that he isn't Charles after all.

After discovering a photo of Mrs. DiLaurentis with Jason and another boy, Alison and Jason found out that they had an older brother that was, in fact, Charles. Kenneth explains that Charles tried to hurt Alison when she was a kid; he was subsequently admitted to Radley for diagnosis, and he died when he was 16. The Liars then searched Radley for answers, discovering that there was another person who visited Charles in Radley: Alison's great aunt Carol. Alison, Jason, Hanna, and Spencer later discover Charles' grave in her backyard. Meanwhile, Mona later returns to Rosewood, heavily questioned by the police about her actions while her friendship with Lesli is strained because of her involvement with Mona's actions. It is later revealed that Lesli was a former patient at Radley, and was roommates with Bethany Young, leading the girls to suspect that Lesli may be 'A'. Mona, however, tells them that Lesli is only pretending to be stable and that Charles faked his own death.

When the girls found out that Charles was coming to the DiLaurentis household (for his birthday), they plan on catching him as he is set to meet with Jason. However, the plan backfires when the police appeared. Rosewood High ultimately bans the girls from their prom and graduation after an incident at Aria's photo gallery contest. Hanna discovers that the company who gave her a scholarship is affiliated with Radley (and Mr. DiLaurentis). She and Spencer decided to return the money to the company, where they meet Rhys Matthews, whom they later suspected to be Charles. The girls also became suspicious of Aria's friend Clark, believing that he may be working for Charles when they saw him following Rhys into a warehouse. Despite being banned, the girls head over to the prom when they discover that Alison was meeting Charles there. Subsequently, Charles kidnaps Alison at the prom; the girls began searching for her, along with Ezra, Toby, Caleb, Sara, Mona, and Clark (who is revealed to be an undercover agent).

Working with Mona and Sara, the girls finally infiltrate A's lair, where they discover a live feed of Alison coming face to face with Charles, who is revealed to be CeCe Drake. CeCe then begins to explain her story and motives, revealing that she was born as Charles, but was not accepted by her father for believing she was a girl. She was sent to Radley, where she eventually transitioned into Charlotte. She also explains what led to Mrs. Cavanaugh's death at the hands of Bethany Young, her complicated relationship with Bethany and her subsequent death, the events regarding the night Alison disappeared, the deal she made with Mona, the events at the burning lodge, Wilden's death, the events in New York, and their mother's death. She explained that she did everything just to be closer to her family, and she became 'A' when she thought that the Liars were happy about Alison's 'death', so she wanted to make them suffer for it but couldn't stop the game because she grew obsessed with it. CeCe also reveals that Sara is both the other Red Coat and The Black Widow, working under CeCe's orders, leaving Emily distraught. CeCe heads for the roof to commit suicide (after her bomb attempt fails and Emily subdues Sara), but Alison and the girls convince her to stop, saying they now understand why she became 'A'. CeCe then surrenders and declares the game over. On Labor Day weekend, the girls say goodbye as they are leaving for college except for Alison who stays in Rosewood.

Five years later, as the girls have each pursued their own path and have started adjusting to a life without 'A', they are once again called back to Rosewood when Alison asks for their help for her sister Charlotte to be released from the psychiatric hospital. While the girls agree to help, Aria is the only who tells the brutally honest truth: she is still scared of Charlotte and doesn't want her released. Eventually, she is, only for her to be murdered the same night and then thrown from the church's bell tower. At her funeral, the girls are stunned to see Sara show up and begin to question her sudden appearance.

Sara starts stalking Emily. It is later revealed that on the night 'A' was revealed, after Emily punched Sara, Sara tried to stand up and put her hands on an electrical block, severely injuring her hands and making it difficult for her to touch or hold things. Eventually, a new 'A' rises, sending threatening messages with creepy emojis to the Liars, determined to get answers on the night Charlotte was murdered. Convinced that Sara is 'Uber A', the girls search for answers. Ali reveals that she and Charlotte's doctor, Elliott, are dating. Later they are married by Aria. The girls initially suspect Aria killed Charlotte. The suspicion shifts to Ezra and then Byron. Later, the suspicion shifts to Melissa when Spencer discovers Melissa's suitcase is broken with the missing part matching the description of the alleged murder weapon. Emily eventually finds it and is nearly run over by a truck and the driver steals the weapon. To save Ezra from losing his book deal with Aria's publishing company, she decides to write and submit some chapters for Ezra's new book. She's forced to tell him and they finish it together.

Emily is donating eggs to pay for school and loses her eggs when the clinic encounters a minor shutdown of its freezers; Aria gets burned by a fire caused by a malfunction at Hanna's bridal shower; and Alison falls down a flight of stairs. The girls build a plan of attack, which offers Hanna as bait. After Ali sees what appears to be her dead mother and Detective Wilden, she starts to question her sanity and checks herself into the same hospital Charlotte attended. Spencer, Toby and Mona work together to catch Sara, but instead they find old medical records for a woman named Mary Drake, and she was the one who gave birth to Charles while a patient at the Radley (now a hotel managed by Ashley Marin) 25 years ago, the DiLaurentis family adopted Charles as she was unable to take care of him.

The girls' plan is leave Hanna waiting for 'Uber A' to arrive at Lost Woods Resort, while Aria and the boys are out hiding, but when Hanna goes missing they find out that 'Uber A' used a secret passage and kidnapped her. Looking over footage from cameras outside, they all are shocked to see what looks to be Mrs. D, asking themselves how this is possible. At Alison's house, "Wilden" rips off his mask revealing himself to be Elliott, and Mary Drake, who is revealed to be Jessica's twin, joins him. They succeeded in committing Alison, and with Ali hospitalized, he has her money and the house as her husband, which is their revenge for what happened to Charlotte, as he was in love with her and Mary always felt an attachment as her birth mother. She glances at a photograph of Charlotte and says it is what she would've wanted. In the last scene, we see Hanna's unconscious body being dragged by 'Uber A' in the church's bell tower.

== Cast ==
=== Main cast ===
- Troian Bellisario as Spencer Hastings
- Ashley Benson as Hanna Marin
- Tyler Blackburn as Caleb Rivers
- Lucy Hale as Aria Montgomery
- Ian Harding as Ezra Fitz
- Shay Mitchell as Emily Fields
- Janel Parrish as Mona Vanderwaal
- Sasha Pieterse as Alison DiLaurentis
- Laura Leighton as Ashley Marin

=== Recurring cast ===
- Dre Davis as Sara Harvey
- Travis Winfrey as Lorenzo Calderon
- Keegan Allen as Toby Cavanaugh
- Jim Abele as Kenneth DiLaurentis
- Lesley Fera as Veronica Hastings
- Nia Peeples as Pam Fields
- Holly Marie Combs as Ella Montgomery
- Huw Collins as Dr. Elliott Rollins
- Drew Van Acker as Jason DiLaurentis
- Chad Lowe as Byron Montgomery
- Andrea Parker as Jessica DiLaurentis and Mary Drake
- Titus Makin, Jr. as Clark Wilkins
- Roberto Aguire as Liam Greene

=== Guest cast ===
- Vanessa Ray as CeCe Drake / Charlotte DiLaurentis
- Roma Maffia as Lieutenant Linda Tanner
- Lulu Brud as Sabrina
- David Coussins as Jordan Hobart
- Rebecca Breeds as Nicole Gordon
- Kara Royster as Yvonne Phillips
- Torrey DeVitto as Melissa Hastings
- Brendan Robinson as Lucas Gottesman
- Nolan North as Peter Hastings
- Bryce Johnson as Darren Wilden
- Brandon Firla as Gil
- Blake Berris as Damian Hayes
- Klea Scott as Jillian Howe
- Brandon W. Jones as Andrew Campbell
- Nathaniel Buzolic as Dean Stavros
- Caleb Lane as Rhys Matthews
- Jim Titus as Officer Barry Maple
- Annabeth Gish as Dr. Anne Sullivan
- Cody Allen Christian as Mike Montgomery
- Elizabeth McLaughlin as Lesli Stone
- Skyler Day as Claire
- Karla Droege as Marion Cavanaugh
- Jessica Belkin as Bethany Young
- Melanie Moreno as Cindy
- Monica Moreno as Mindy
- Maddie Ziegler as Creepy Dancer
- Amy Yasbeck as Claudia

== Episodes ==
No. overall	No. in season	Title	Directed by	Written by	Original release date	U.S. viewers (millions)
121	1	"Game On, Charles"	Chad Lowe	Story by : I. Marlene King; Teleplay by : I. Marlene King & Lijah J. Barasz	June 2, 2015	2.38
An unknown blonde girl watches from the shadows as the girls attempt to escape the dollhouse. ‘A’ locks them outside and leaves them at the mercy of the elements for two nights before ending the punishment. They are hardly relieved to go back inside, but see it as the better of two poor options. ‘A’ welcomes them “home” by gassing them again. The girls wake up hours later, posed on metal tables like bodies in a morgue. They are directed to their individual rooms where ‘A’ leaves them separated and confined for three weeks. Back in Rosewood, proof of Mona’s life has allowed Alison to be released from jail. She publicly requests privacy during an emotional time. The police stay inside the DiLaurentis house in hopes that ‘A’ will show up if they believe Alison is unprotected. Unbeknownst to them, Alison’s public speech contains a covert message for 'A’ to meet her at the kissing rock. She, Caleb, Ezra, and Toby fake a call from ‘A’ to distract the police long enough for Alison to leave her house undetected. The liars are visibly shaken when they are finally released from their rooms. ‘A’ directs them to set up for Alison’s arrival. With the real Alison apparently on her way, Mona has been discarded and trapped in a hole. The girls read newspaper articles about their families, and the reminder of home inspires them to make another escape attempt. Spencer explains that each of the cryptic messages from Mona’s bedroom is an anagram for Charles DiLaurentis. She posits that they can use sentimental items from Charles’s vault to bargain for their freedom. During the nightly power lapse, the girls enter the vault and begin to light things on fire. Charles pulls an alarm, and the girls find Mona before heading for the exit. Alison wears a trackable pair of shoes so Caleb and Ezra can follow her once ‘A’ takes her to the dollhouse. Things quickly go south, and the plan proves to be too risky. They’re about to give up when Alison hears the faint sound of a fire alarm. She, Caleb, and Ezra find the entrance to the dollhouse just as the five girls emerge, relieved to be safe at last. Police discover the mysterious blonde girl who introduces herself as Sara Harvey.
122	2	"Songs of Innocence"	Norman Buckley	Joseph Dougherty	June 9, 2015	2.13
After leaving the dollhouse, the liars remain haunted by memories of their captivity. Their loved ones’ questions are difficult to answer, and none of the girls seem to want to talk to each other. Aria is eager to accept a police interview. While speaking to the detective, Aria’s story changes to make Andrew look more guilty. Ezra suggests journaling as a coping mechanism, and Aria is staunchly against the idea. She wants a clean break from the dollhouse, and is willing to ignore certain realities to make that happen. When Spencer can’t find her anti-anxiety medication, Veronica admits that she didn’t have that prescription filled. Without the medication, Spencer’s memories of the dollhouse make it impossible to sleep. She steals one of Aria’s pills out of desperation. However, Veronica offers to stay up with Spencer until she falls asleep, and the stolen pill goes untaken. Emily takes one of her father’s guns to a firing range. As she shoots, she remembers using a switch board to decide which of the other girls will receive a punishment. Pam is concerned that Emily has chosen a dangerous way to express her anger. Emily admits that she is more afraid than she is angry, and that firing a gun only made her feel worse. Hanna’s bedroom reminds her too much of her room in the dollhouse. She wastes no time peeling off her wallpaper and getting rid of her furniture. Hanna’s frenetic energy concerns Caleb and Ashley, and their concern makes Hanna feel like she’s under a microscope. Caleb promises that Hanna is brave enough to get through this. Alison asks her father if there is a Charles in their family. His immediate denial is suspicious, and the empty spaces in their family’s photo album make it look like he’s hiding something. Toby’s new police partner, Lorenzo, introduces himself to Alison. She is embarrassed to think of what he’s heard about her, but Lorenzo seems willing to let Alison make a first impression on him. Emily develops a fascination with Sara Harvey. Sara’s complicated relationship with her mother leads her to run away from home, and she ends up at the Fields house. Pam agrees to let Sara stay the night. This major update re-opens the line of communication between the four liars.
123	3	"Songs of Experience"	Norman Buckley	Joseph Dougherty	June 16, 2015	1.74
The liars prepare to go back to school together. Hanna is especially motivated to return with her friends by her side, but Emily, Aria, and Spencer find last-minute reasons to avoid Rosewood High for another day. Emily feels bad leaving Sara alone and decides to stay home with her. Aria lingers at The Brew after ordering her coffee to-go, and Ezra encourages her to stick around. Spencer visits the DiLaurentis house where Alison is busy reflecting on a lifetime of poor decisions. Spencer stays to help her through her feelings of guilt. Dr. Sullivan sees Hanna alone at school and offers her a listening ear. Hanna agrees, opening up about the tension in her friendgroup post-dollhouse. Lorenzo asks Alison if she would be interested in coaching a girls’ soccer team. Alison doubts she would have the approval of any parents. Toby asks Spencer to keep Alison away from Lorenzo, but Spencer doesn’t want to interfere. Ezra calls Andrew’s doctor and requests information about him to satisfy Aria’s curiosity. The doctor won’t release anything sensitive, but they let it slip that Andrew was adopted. Spencer asks Jason if he knows of a Charles DiLaurentis. Jason says that he used to have an imaginary friend named Charlie until his father decided one day that Charlie had to go away. Hanna convinces the others to join her at Dr. Sullivan’s office. The girls are ready to spill everything until ‘A’ calls and threatens Sara’s life if the girls say a word. With Andrew in police custody, it is unclear who is behind this threat. Alison is disappointed to learn that her father lied to her. She and the girls search the DiLaurentis house for evidence of Charles, and Aria finds a photo of Jessica with two young boys. Alison and Jason present the photo to their father and demand answers from him. The liars finally discuss the dollhouse switchboard. They confirm that they were all forced to play the same “game,” and that none of them ever received the promised electric shock when their switch was flipped. Andrew is released from jail when the police can’t gather enough evidence against him. He doesn’t hold back from expressing his vitriol for the liars, leaving them feeling guilty for accusing him and afraid that the real ‘A’ is still at large.
124	4	"Don't Look Now"	Arlene Sanford	Jonell Lennon	June 23, 2015	1.84
Alison finally learns the truth from her father: Charles is the eldest DiLaurentis sibling. When Alison was a baby, Charles nearly drowned her in a bathtub. Mr. and Mrs. DiLaurentis admitted Charles to Radley and, when he was sixteen, he committed suicide. Mrs. DiLaurentis scattered Charles’s ashes without Kenneth’s participation. Alison doesn’t know whether to fear Charles or pity him. The girls sneak into a warehouse where all unclaimed Radley files are being stored. They find Charles’s patient record and note that it ends just after an increase in his medication. They also see Alison’s late Aunt Carol on the visitor log. Caleb’s overprotective behavior begins to wear on Hanna. Things come to a head when he admits to placing a tracking device on her car. She makes it clear that his actions aren’t acceptable, no matter how worried he is. Hanna asks for some space, and Caleb obliges. At Hollis College, Aria meets a fellow photographer named Clark, and the two strike up a friendship. Aria is developing some photos when she sees an ‘A’ message. It triggers a dollhouse memory in which ‘A’ cuts her hair short after she refuses to dye it pink. That night, Aria opens up to her father, finally accepting his emotional support. Spencer is haunted by a dollhouse memory in which she wakes up covered in blood, terrified that 'A' made her hurt someone. Spencer looks for Aria’s anti-anxiety medication in the trash, but doesn’t find it. She ends up getting marijuana from The Brew’s newest hire, Sabrina. Pam decides that she and Emily can’t continue to let Sara stay with them. Emily is protective of Sara, not wanting to ask her to return to an abusive household. Sara realizes that her presence isn’t welcome and moves back home on her own, assuring Emily that she will be fine. Jason tells Alison that he recently caught their mother tending to Aunt Carol’s empty house. They wonder if Charles could be living inside. Alison, Jason, Hanna, and Spencer decide to check the place out. They don’t find Charles, but there is a headstone in the yard with his name on it. The grave marker is surrounded by tree roots, indicating that it was placed a long time ago. 'A' ending: ‘A’ uses their computer to track the girls’ exact locations.
125	5	"She's No Angel"	Michael Grossman	Oliver Goldstick & Maya Goldsmith	June 30, 2015	1.80
Spencer has a nightmare of a young girl dancing around a familiar, creepy room. She wonders if it could have been a vision of the dollhouse. Sabrina’s pot cookies provide temporary relief from her anxiety, but Spencer decides she can’t become reliant on drugs again. She goes to an addiction recovery meeting and runs into Dean, her former rehab coach. Lorenzo keeps Alison company while she’s stuck at home. Alison overhears a cop badmouthing her to his partner, but Kenneth accuses her of making up a story so Lorenzo could fill the position. Despite her father’s disapproval, Alison continues fostering a relationship with Lorenzo, eventually sharing a kiss with him. Emily suggests that Sara look into getting emancipated from her mother. They seek advice from Caleb, who offers Sara a job so that she can demonstrate an ability to support herself. Once Sara’s application is under review, she and Emily celebrate by getting tattoos. Mona’s time away from Rosewood hasn’t relieved her of her stress. She is afraid of Alison’s retaliation, and that she will be in legal trouble for faking her death. At The Brew, Hanna and Mona are accosted by Lesli Stone. She was caught perjuring herself at Alison’s trial and blames Mona for the trouble she’s in. Hanna is frustrated with Lesli for making Mona feel worse. Clark invites Aria with him on a photography outing. Aria is taking macabre photos of junkyard dolls when she sees a dark figure walk by. She later discovers a photo of ‘A’ among Clark’s negatives. To Aria’s surprise, ‘A’ appears to have a woman’s figure. Sara finds out that Emily and her friends are still trying to identify ‘A’, and she freaks out. Hanna and Spencer sneak into Radley to find more information on Charles. Spencer recognizes a room in the asylum’s basement as the one from her nightmare. The girls find a record of Charles’s organs being donated post mortem. On their way out, they catch Mona trying to steal Lesli’s file. The girls are shocked to learn that Lesli was a patient at Radley, and that Bethany Young was her roommate. It seems plausible that Lesli is assuming Charles’s identity and seeking revenge for Bethany’s murder. Mona tells Lesli that her secret is out, and Lesli explodes with anger. 'A' ending: ‘A’ creates a doll-sized wig with pink streaks in it, seemingly modeled after Aria’s hair.
126	6	"No Stone Unturned"	Chad Lowe	Oliver Goldstick & Maya Goldsmith	July 14, 2015	1.70
With Mona confined to her house, the girls have to gather their own intel on Lesli Stone. Hanna steals Lesli’s keys so she and Spencer can search her car. Amid the mess, they find several pairs of fake glasses and four human-sized cages. Clark catches Aria returning his negatives, but he isn’t upset with her. Aria finds a doll at the junkyard with pink streaks in its hair and a knife through its eye. Ezra gives Aria an unsolicited letter recommending her for the photography contest. Caleb shows Sara the ropes on her first day at work. Sara asks about Alison, curious to know the person whom she was forced to imitate in the dollhouse. Hanna is fed up with Caleb’s overbearing behavior. Ashley sympathizes with Caleb and tells him that all Hanna really wants is for things to go back to normal. Caleb finds Hanna and initiates sex with her. Spencer continues to debate whether or not to speak at commencement. Dean suggests she decline the responsibility, while Sara encourages her to use the opportunity to tell her story in her own words. Ultimately, Spencer agrees to write the speech. Dean panics when Spencer misses an addiction recovery meeting. He admits to having feelings for her and decides he can’t stay invested if she doesn’t reciprocate. Nicole Gordon invites Emily and Sara on an upcoming Habitat for Humanity trip to Thailand. A car just like Lesli’s swipes Sara with its side mirror, injuring her arm and sending her into a frenzy. She firmly rejects the idea of going to Thailand with Emily. Aria, Hanna, and Spencer sneak into the science lab where Lesli works as a teacher’s assistant. Hanna sets off a metal detector, and the girls discover the microchips implanted in their necks. Hanna impulsively releases the laboratory animals from their cages. The girls are scrambling to re-contain them when Mona shows up and shares some important information: Lesli wouldn’t have any reason to mess with the liars, and the documentation of Charles’s organ donation is fake. Emily discreetly checks Sara’s neck for a microchip, and Sara surprises her with a passionate kiss. At The Brew, Aria notices a connection forming between Ezra and Nicole. Charles leaves a threatening message under Kenneth’s windshield wiper. Kenneth digs up Charles’s grave to see for himself whether anyone is buried beneath the headstone.
127	7	"O Brother, Where Art Thou"	Bethany Rooney	Lijah J. Barasz	July 21, 2015	1.77
Lesli backs out of her agreement to meet up and answer the liars’ questions. Mona swears she doesn’t know who ‘A’ is despite being the one to pass them the torch. Sara’s old friend, Claire, comes back to Rosewood looking to reconnect. She invites Sara to stay at her house. Emily becomes jealous and protective, but Sara thinks living separately will make it easier to begin their relationship in earnest. An investment firm called The Carissimi Group awards Hanna an educational scholarship. Hanna and Spencer do some digging, and what they find leads them to believe the company is a front for an ‘A’ scheme. Aria is ready to get rid of her dolls and find a new artistic muse. Mona has been avoiding Mike since she and the liars escaped the dollhouse. Mona feels guilty for devising a plan that caused way more problems than it was worth. Mike agrees that Mona screwed up, but he still loves her. Kenneth drives himself and Alison far outside of Rosewood in fear of what Charles has planned. Back home, Jason is invited to meet Charles alone at an arcade. The girls decide to remove their microchips and prepare an ambush. Toby thinks the plan is too dangerous, so he and Lorenzo go to the arcade on a two-man mission. Toby gobbles up a bag of sweets that Sabrina gave to Spencer, unaware that they are laced with marijuana. It isn’t long before the liars become restless, abandon Toby’s plan, and head for the arcade. Alison slips her father a sleeping pill and sneaks out of their hotel. Mona gives her a ride, and Alison calls the police on the way back to Rosewood. The meeting between Jason and Charles is interrupted by Toby and Lorenzo, followed by the liars and the rest of the Rosewood P.D. Toby is too impaired to focus, and Charles gets away. Aria gets her letter of acceptance into the photography contest. Spencer tries to apologize to Toby, but he can’t hold a conversation. Emily smashes her microchip. Jason is furious with the liars for sabotaging his meeting with Charles. In their attic, Alison and Jason find a video of themselves as children celebrating Charles’s birthday at the arcade. 'A' ending: ‘A’ unwraps a framed photo of Alison, Jason, and Charles at the arcade.
128	8	"FrAmed"	Larry Reibman	Bryan M. Holdman	July 28, 2015	1.58
The police name Charles DiLaurentis as the main suspect in the girls’ abduction and Jessica DiLaurentis’s murder. Alison struggles to reconcile the Charles she met as a kid with the monster behind the ‘A’ mask. Clark asks a lot of questions that Aria isn’t comfortable answering. As a finalist in the photography contest, Aria’s work will be displayed at a gallery exhibition. Tanner offers to fill the event with undercover cops to discourage ‘A’ from interfering. Emily is thinking about asking Sara to prom, but she doesn’t know whether the event will be suitable for a first date. Aria is the only single friend in the group now, and she doesn’t know whom to take to prom. She floats the idea to Ezra before realizing how weird that would be. Hanna and Spencer go to The Carissimi Group to return Hanna’s scholarship and gather intel. They speak with a man named Rhys Matthews who looks like he could be a DiLaurentis. His answers to the girls’ questions are vague, and he won’t take back the money. Lorenzo tries to get information about Charles’s case for Alison, but his access is limited. Alison takes care of Lorenzo and his broken arm, then swipes his police badge after he falls asleep. Tanner catches Alison at the station looking mournfully at the evidence bags full of Charles’s childhood mementos. Lorenzo is angry that Alison betrayed his trust and got him in trouble at work. Ezra surprises Aria by showing up to the gallery exhibition. Nicole comes with him, but Ezra insists it’s not a date. Nicole is a fellow photographer, and Ezra is thinking about joining her Habitat team. When the gallery lights go up, it’s revealed that Aria’s photos have been replaced with pictures of the liars in the dollhouse. Ella is frustrated that the extensive police presence couldn’t prevent a catastrophe like this from happening. Feeling re-traumatized, Aria looks to Ezra for comfort. Hanna, Spencer, and Emily spot Rhys outside the gallery and follow him to an abandoned doll factory. Clark arrives shortly after and follows Rhys inside. The girls don’t know what to make of Clark’s apparent involvement. 'A' ending: ‘A’ has a tuxedo, a toolbox, and six syringes in the trunk of their car. Red Coat hands ‘A’ two tickets to prom.
129	9	"Last Dance"	Janice Cooke	Oliver Goldstick & Francesca Rollins	August 4, 2015	2.03
The school board bans the liars from prom and commencement, claiming their presence is a safety liability. Veronica offers to host a “promette” for the girls in the Hastings’ barn. Aria wins the photography contest, granting her a summer internship in Los Angeles. Ezra accepts Aria’s prom invite now that the details of the event have changed. Emily asks Sara to prom, but Sara already has plans for the same night. Hanna worries that Caleb’s trip to New York is a front so he can hunt down ‘A’. Toby is suspended from his job at the police department. Spencer encourages Lorenzo to forgive Alison, but she may have lost his trust for good. Alison gets a text from Charles asking to see her at prom. While the other girls meet up in the barn, Alison slips away to Rosewood High. The moms open a bottle of wine in the Hastings kitchen and gossip about the countless DiLaurentis scandals. They share their suspicions that Kenneth was responsible for Jessica’s murder. Uninhibited, Veronica decides to march over and ask him directly. She and the moms find Rhys Matthews alone in the DiLaurentis house. He makes an excuse and scurries away. A mysterious noise lures the moms into the basement where an unseen villain traps them indefinitely. The liars spot Alison in a photo from prom and soon find themselves on a mission to save her from her own impulses. Alison ignores her friends’ concerns, determined to confront her long lost sibling. Aria finds Clark taking photos of the event and makes sure to keep an eye on him. Caleb and Sara make surprise appearances, and the liars each dance with their respective partners. Ezra reveals his summer plans to volunteer with Habitat for Humanity. Spencer tells Toby that her commencement speech was inspired by him. Caleb announces that he found a job that will pay for Hanna’s tuition and a place for them to live together in New York. Alison catches a glimpse of Charles and chases after the red-hooded figure. Clark follows, and the liars corner him. He confesses that he has been acting as an undercover cop. Lorenzo shows up to reconcile with Alison, but he’s too late. Amid the chaos, she and Charles have evaded their persuers. Charles reveals their identity to Alison, leaving her stunned.
130	10	"Game Over, Charles"	I. Marlene King	I. Marlene King	August 11, 2015	3.09
Mona locates ‘A’s base of operations at The Carissimi Group. She, Sara, and the liars find ‘A’s lair, but Sara hesitates to go inside and is separated from the group. A holographic projection displays a live stream of Alison talking to a hooded figure. Kenneth and Jason lie paralyzed on the floor nearby. ‘A’ turns around, and the girls are shocked to see that it’s Cece Drake. Cece confirms that she and Charles DiLaurentis are the same person. As a child, Cece lacked a necessary awareness of human mortality. Her efforts to care for baby Alison often ended in disaster, and she was committed to Radley after one too many incidents. Jessica routinely visited her daughter while Kenneth kept his distance. Cece began to present as Charlotte around her trusted friend, Bethany Young. Bethany’s kind disposition flipped when she killed Marion Cavanaugh and pointed the finger at Cece. Jessica bribed Detective Wilden to rule the death a suicide. After a symbolic funeral for “Charles,” Cece began living as Charlotte. She used her out privileges to attend college and pay unauthorized visits to her siblings. Cece developed a friendship with Alison, as well as a controversial romantic relationship with Jason. Jessica warned Cece that Kenneth believed “Charles’s” grave to be real. The night Bethany snuck out of Radley, Cece followed her to Rosewood. She mistook Alison for Bethany and hit her with a rock. Jessica buried one daughter to save the other, and Wilden accepted another bribe. Cece learned about the ‘A’ game from Mona, took the reins, and quickly found herself obsessed. Cece treated the liars like her dolls, “taking care” of them in much the same way she did Alison when they were young. Mona realizes that she is the one who hit Bethany that fateful night. Sara reveals her allegiance to Cece, and Emily is outraged. Spencer and Mona identify Radley as the source of the live stream. The girls race to the asylum where Spencer diffuses a bomb Cece had planted. Cece goes to the roof of the building and debates jumping off the edge before opting to surrender instead. Once the dust has settled, the girls see each other off to college and go their separate ways. A flash forward shows Alison writing on a chalkboard at Rosewood High. The liars storm into the classroom and warn Alison that someone is coming after her.
131	11	"Of Late I Think of Rosewood"	Ron Lagomarsino	Joseph Dougherty	January 12, 2016	2.25
After five years at a correctional hospital, a hearing is scheduled to decide whether Charlotte will be released. The liars put their new lives on hold and return to Rosewood. Spencer is a lobbyist in Washington D.C. Her relationship with Toby ended when their lives fell out of sync. Veronica is running for State Senate, and Toby is building a house. Aria works for the publishing company that released Ezra Fitz’s first novel. While they’re expecting a sequel, a recent tragedy has killed Ezra’s motivation. Hanna is an assistant to a fashion designer in New York. She and her fiancé, Jordan, enjoy a lavish lifestyle. Hanna and Caleb are on friendly terms, but her career seems to be a sore subject. Caleb is staying in the Hastings’ barn while he’s in town. Ashley has remodeled Radley Sanitarium into a hotel. Emily avoids talking about her life, having struggled to regain her footing after her father passed away. She covertly takes unspecified medications. Alison teaches English at Rosewood High. She and Dr. Rollins have been supporting Charlotte’s treatment and rehabilitation. The girls meet with Alison and listen to her pleas. She insists that Charlotte is no longer a threat, and asks for their statements at the hearing to reflect that. The girls push back, but Alison’s disappointment is far more persuasive than her threats ever were. One by one, Spencer, Hanna, and Emily tell the judge that they are no longer afraid of Charlotte. Aria has prepared a similar statement, but abandons it to express her true feelings: she opposes Charlotte’s release. The final statement is made by Mona, who speaks about her empathy for Charlotte’s situation. The judge makes her decision, and Charlotte goes home with Alison. The liars meet up at The Radley for drinks. They congratulate Aria for her integrity, and the rest of the night is spent enjoying each other’s company. The next morning, Charlotte is found dead in the grass beneath the open window of the church bell tower. Alison is devastated and looks to Emily for comfort. Sara Harvey shows up to the funeral in a black veil and gloves. The liars discuss their culpability in something bad that happened to her. After the service, Lorenzo strongly advises the liars to stay in town for the investigation into Charlotte’s murder.
132	12	"Charlotte's Web"	Joanna Kerns	Jonell Lennon & Lijah J. Barasz	January 19, 2016	1.66
The Liars begin to suspect one another about Charlotte's murder. Aria returns to Boston sooner than advised, raising Alison's suspicions. Hanna confronts Aria, knowing she had left the hotel with Ezra during the time of Charlotte's death. Aria explains that she was unable to sleep and went to speak with Ezra; together, they saw Charlotte enter the church shortly before her death. To protect Aria, Hanna deletes Radley's security footage showing Aria and Ezra leaving and later returning around the time of the murder. Spencer realizes that Charlotte was killed in an exact manner resembling a murder described in one of her college essays. Emily continues to lie about her life in California while coping with her father's death, while Alison grows increasingly wary of the Liars. 'Uber A' ending: 'Uber A' puts flowers on the fresh grave next to Jessica DiLaurentis's, and walking over to a black car. Before stepping inside, their chauffeur says, "I’m sorry for your loss."
133	13	"The Gloves Are On"	Kimberly McCullough	Oliver Goldstick & Maya Goldsmith	January 26, 2016	1.65
To save her mother's job at Radley, Hanna enlists Lucas' help to provide an alibi. Aria secretly submits the first two chapters of Ezra's new book to her boss, and after receiving a positive response, begins writing the remainder herself under his name. Spencer reveals to Hanna that she has feelings for Caleb. Pam discovers the truth about Emily's fabricated life, leading Emily to admit that she is financially struggling and selling her eggs. Sara's hands are revealed to be severely injured from accidentally touching an electrical block after Emily's punch on the night of "A's" reveal. Melissa receives a message about a tape and fears that a recording she sent Spencer about Bethany Young may have fallen into the wrong hands. Believing the tape might be Radley's security footage, the girls confront Ezra, who refuses to talk. Spencer returns home and Caleb comforts her, revealing their feelings as they kiss. The Liars then begin receiving threatening messages from a new stalker. 'Uber A' ending: "Uber A" opens a tote with the signature "A" black hoodie and gloves and dumps them into a garbage bin before searching for "UNIFORMS" on the internet.
134	14	"New Guys, New Lies"	Zetna Fuentes	Kyle Bown & Kateland Brown	February 2, 2016	1.39
Hanna comes clean about The Radley security footage. Ashley tells Hanna that all of The Radley's security footage is backed up by a hardware security drive at a place called The Farm and the police will find out sooner or later that Aria left the hotel. Hanna tells Jordan, who forgives her and enlists the help of a lawyer. When arriving at the police station, Lorenzo tells them that The Farm lost the backup security footage and it is shown that Ashley stole the footage. When the murder weapon is revealed to be a nine iron, Aria, with Emily's help, tries to find out if Ezra is guilty. Unable to get into Ezra's loft as he is out of town, Aria breaks in. In the loft, she finds Ezra's nine iron isn't missing, but then she hears a voicemail coming in from her dad and worries that Byron might have had something to do with Charlotte's murder. Later, Aria checks Byron's car to see his golf clubs and its nine iron is missing. Spencer meets Toby's new girlfriend, Yvonne, who is the daughter of Veronica's campaign rival. 'Uber A' ending: 'Uber A', dressed as a hotel concierge, who had previously been watching Emily from a window, is seen getting into a black car and takes off the glasses and rips off their "old man" mask.
135	15	"Do Not Disturb"	Melanie Mayron	Bryan M. Holdman	February 9, 2016	1.22
Byron tells Aria that he and Ella are engaged, and Ella tells Aria that they were together the night Charlotte was murdered. Spencer has a lunch meeting for her mother's campaign team, but Yvonne shows up instead. Hanna and Caleb devise a plan to recreate the backup hard drive and plant it in a garbage bin, making it look like they have given up the security footage. Meanwhile, Emily has the surgery to remove some of her eggs and donates them. Sara visits Alison at school, making Alison realize that Sara and Charlotte were closer than she thought. Aria and Spencer look for evidence that Sara Harvey is behind the new threats by breaking into her hotel room. while there, they discover Sara is staying in what was Charlotte's Radley room. Aria goes investigating into the closet and when she doesn't return, Spencer goes after her and discovers a hole in the wall with a ladder leading down into darkness. 'Uber A' ending: 'Uber A' puts the hard drive into their laptop which plays a video of Caleb, saying that they can also change the rules and a virus is put onto the laptop.
136	16	"Where Somebody Waits for Me"	Joseph Dougherty	Joseph Dougherty	February 16, 2016	1.36
Spencer is worried that her mother is keeping secrets from her, regarding her health which could jeopardize her campaign. Aria admits to Liam the truth about Ezra's new book after she confirms his suspicions. Ali explains to Spencer that she and Elliott are more than just friends and Mona shows where her allegiances lies. Meanwhile, Caleb, Spencer, and Hanna deal with the repercussions of their new relationships. Emily suspects the new stalker had something to do with her missing eggs as the clinic encountered a minor shutdown of its freezers. Detective Tanner suspects the girls were somehow involved in Charlotte's death. Hanna, Emily and Aria investigate the mysterious alleyway to which the ladder in Sara's room leads to and uncover a secret passage that leads to somewhere out the back of the hotel which they suspect is how Sara has been getting in and out of the hotel unseen. Spencer discovers that Melissa's suitcase is broken with the missing part matching the description of the alleged murder weapon. 'Uber A' ending: 'Uber A' cleans off an electric switchboard in The Radley secret basement listening to "Whistle While You Work" from Snow White and the Seven Dwarfs.
137	17	"We've All Got Baggage"	Paula Hunziker	Oliver Goldstick	February 23, 2016	1.27
Sara checks out of The Radley and leaves her room in a state of chaos. The hole in the closet has vanished without a trace, sealing away the forgotten corridors of the sanitarium. Aria tells Ezra about the chapters she wrote for his book. His anger is mitigated by his understanding of Aria’s good intentions. Liam finds out about the romantic history between Aria and Ezra, and he begins to question the time they’ve been spending together. Spencer doesn’t want to believe her sister could be Charlotte’s killer. Melissa was ostensibly in London that night, but her story of how her suitcase got broken is less than airtight. Emily meets Damian while signing up for classes at Hollis, and she decides to find out what he knows. According to Damian, Melissa was back from London before Charlotte’s release and murder. Hanna remembers seeing Melissa at a fashion event in London. Melissa was a wreck after Charlotte sabotaged her relationship with Wren, and Hanna thinks she was angry enough to want revenge. ‘A’ begins messaging Alison now that she’s back on the liars’ team. They know that Charlotte ran away the night she was killed after finding out about Alison and Elliott’s relationship. Alison feels responsible for setting off the chain of events that ended in her sister’s death. Spencer convinces her mother to go public with her cancer diagnosis. Veronica’s announcement is undercut when ‘A’ leaks Yvonne’s medical records from Spencer’s IP address. Caleb takes the blame, and he is promptly evicted from the Hastings’ barn. ‘A’ threatens to fertilize Emily’s eggs and create an actual baby. Emily goes to The Two Crows where a car makes several attempts to run her down. She finds a metal rod that could be the murder weapon, but the car’s driver manages to swipe it before leaving the scene. Byron asks Aria to officiate his and Ella’s wedding. Hanna helps Ella find her dress and volunteers to style the event. Ella talks about distant memories of her high school sweetheart, and Hanna is inspired to set a date for her own wedding. Liam attends the ceremony and mends his relationship with Aria. Later that night, Alison and Elliott show up to Aria’s doorstep and ask that she marry the two of them immediately. 'A' ending: ‘A’ reads the manual for a universal remote while enjoying a slice of wedding cake.
138	18	"Burn This"	Arthur Anderson	Maya Goldsmith	March 1, 2016	1.15
‘A’ makes Election Day the hard deadline for the liars to give them Charlotte’s killer. Ezra contacts Jillian to credit Aria with the chapters she wrote and pitch the idea of making her his co-author. They plan to write the book as a dialogue between two characters loosely based on Ezra and Nicole. Aria matches an eyewitness description of the person who called Charlotte the night of her murder. She attends a police lineup and does some sleuthing while she’s at the station. Aria discovers that the eyewitness is Sara, and that her statement specifically mentions a keychain with pink dice. Emily visits an auto body shop and finds the car that chased her around The Two Crows. A hostile mechanic denies having rented the car to Melissa, but offers no further information before sending Emily away. The mechanic later receives payment for her cooperation. Caleb finds no vacancy at any hotel, including The Radley. He declines Ashley’s offer to let him stay in her guest room. The Yvonne leak prompts an audit of the Phillips team, exposing Mona’s recent collusion with the Hastings. Mona blames Spencer and Caleb for the loss of her job. Spencer’s father tells her to publicly distance herself from Caleb. A confrontation with Toby leaves Caleb with a bloody nose, and Spencer tells Toby that ‘A’ is back to quash the conflict. A flashback shows Spencer and Toby discussing their fraught relationship over a pending pregnancy test. Spencer interprets Melissa’s hasty return to London as a sign of her guilt. Peter corrects her, explaining that someone blackmailed Melissa with her confession tape so they could frame her for Charlotte’s murder. Hanna is less than excited for the bridal shower her mother has planned. Mona shows up uninvited with a thoughtful gift, but her history of playing the ‘A’ game makes the girls hesitant to trust her. The party turns sour as Hanna realizes how little her friends know about Jordan. The electronic system in Lucas’s loft malfunctions, and Aria comes away with second-degree burns from the fireplace. Ezra visits with Aria at the hospital until Liam shows up to take his place. While cleaning up after the disastrous bridal shower, Emily notices a pair of pink dice hanging from Mona’s keys.
139	19	"Did You Miss Me?"	Roger Kumble	Joseph Dougherty	March 8, 2016	1.26
Election Day is coming up fast, and the liars still have no one they can confidently accuse of murder. Mona is their top suspect now that she’s admitted to calling Charlotte from The Two Crows and asking to meet with her. Still, it’s far from damning, and Mona says Charlotte never showed up that night. Hanna feels caught between her future in New York and the familiarity of Rosewood. Lucas plans to purchase and flip a defunct factory, and he offers to let Hanna use the building to start her own fashion business. Ezra is unsatisfied with the scene in his and Aria’s book where the leads bid each other a romantic goodbye. His new version is a more truthful, less ideal representation of his last conversation with Nicole. Jillian is eager to see a finished draft of Aria’s and Ezra’s book. She removes Liam from the project to ensure Aria stays properly focused. Spencer and Emily follow Sara’s driver around and monitor his shady behavior. After a conversation with Mona, the driver stops into City Hall to pick up a room key and a floor plan for The Radley. He covertly tosses the materials through the window of Sara’s car. Mona and Sara face off and exchange thinly-veiled threats. Mona tells Sara to leave the liars alone, and Sara taunts Mona’s endless pursuit of the girls’ acceptance. Alison’s honeymoon is cut short when she tumbles down a flight of stairs and lands herself in the hospital. She begins to feel like she’s being karmically punished. Alison’s mother visits her in a dream and promises that Elliott will take care of her from now on. Alison wakes with a new sense of hope for the future. Among the many flowers from Elliott in Alison’s hospital room, Hanna finds a card from ‘A’. The message inside confirms ‘A’s intention to take out the five girls one by one. Hanna asks Caleb to help her “confess” to Charlotte’s murder and lure ‘A’ into a trap. The rest of the liars voice their concerns, but Hanna is committed to the plan whether they get on board or not. Spencer can’t help but notice the way Caleb glues himself to Hanna while they strategize. 'A' ending: ‘A’ is watching Veronica’s campaign ad when they receive Hanna’s confession.
140	20	"Hush, Hush, Sweet Liars"	Ron Lagomarsino	I. Marlene King	March 15, 2016	1.19
Caleb is careful to think of everything that could possibly go wrong while setting the trap for ‘A’. He builds an electric fence and installs motion-sensing cameras around The Lost Woods Resort. As they write, Ezra comes to terms with the loss of Nicole, and Aria draws upon the feelings she once had for Ezra. Jillian responds to their first draft with a level of excitement Aria has never seen from her boss. Aria and Ezra celebrate with a spontaneous lovemaking session. Sara’s new hotel room is directly above the forgotten section of Radley’s basement. Toby volunteers to help Spencer investigate, much to the frustration of Yvonne. The pair discovers a secret room in the old sanitarium, as well as the Radley patient file for Charlotte’s biological mother, Mary Drake. Alison begins to see haunting visions of her mother and Detective Wilden. Emily reassures her that the hallucinations are a side effect of her medication, but Alison continues to lose her grip on reality. She voluntarily commits herself to the same psychiatric hospital that facilitated Charlotte’s treatment. It is later revealed to the viewer that Mary Drake and Elliott Rollins were posing as Jessica and Wilden. Elliott is after the Carissimi Group funds, while Mary is acting out of resentment for Jessica. Veronica’s team celebrates her campaign and makes last-minute calls to voters. To Spencer’s surprise, Mona shows up to offer her support. The poll results are announced, and Veronica is elected one of Pennsylvania’s state senators. Spending time with Caleb reopens Hanna’s emotional wounds. The night their relationship ended, Hanna bailed on plans with Caleb in favor of a work event. She changed her mind, but Caleb was already gone by the time Hanna made it back to their apartment. Hanna confesses that she still loves Caleb, and the two kiss. Hanna sends ‘A’ her location from inside a boarded up motel room. A dark figure runs through the area and triggers the cameras, but they avoid electrocution. Meanwhile, Hanna has disappeared through a trap door that was hidden underneath the bed. The liars et al. see a Jessica DiLaurentis look-alike when they review Caleb’s security footage. A mass text taking credit for Hanna’s abduction is signed, “A.D.” 'A' ending: A.D. drags Hanna’s unconscious body across the floor of the church bell tower.

== Specials ==
Special no.	Title	Narrator(s)	Aired between	Original air date	U.S. viewers (million)
1	"Pretty Little Liars: 5 Years Forward"	I. Marlene King & The Cast of Pretty Little Liars	"Game Over, Charles" "Of Late I Think of Rosewood"	November 24, 2015	0.77

== Production ==
=== Development ===
The show was renewed for a sixth and seventh season on June 10, 2014, right before the season five premiere aired, making Pretty Little Liars ABC Family's longest running original series. The sixth and the seventh season will consist of 20 episodes each. Filming for season 6 began on March 24, 2015. It aired 10 episodes for the first half the season, which began airing on June 2, 2015. The table read for the premiere occurred on March 23, 2015, King began writing the mid-season finale, the "summer finale", which was titled "Game Over, Charles", on May 12, 2015.

Like the first season, the sixth season does not include a special holiday-themed episode between the first and second half of the season. Previous holiday-themed episodes have been the thirteenth episode of each previous season excluding the first. The second half of the season features a new intro, after using the same intro in the previous seasons, and features the characters after the five-year time jump.

=== Casting ===
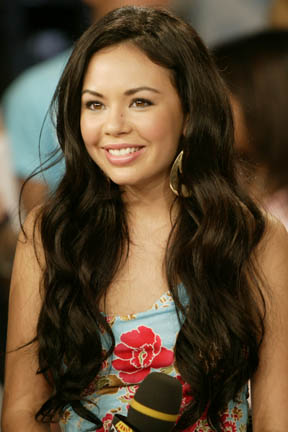
Janel Parrish confirmed to return as a series regular after Mona was revealed to be alive.

Janel Parrish confirmed in an interview that she would be returning to the sixth season as a series regular after her character, Mona Vanderwaal, was supposedly killed in the mid-season finale of season 5. In the fifth-season finale, it was revealed that Mona was alive and had been held prisoner in 'A's dollhouse. Rumer Willis was announced to be returning to the show as Zoe, Emily's coach when she was in Haiti building houses. Rebecca Breeds however, playing another friend of Emily from Haiti named Nicole, replaced Willis' character. It was announced on March 25, 2015, that Project Runway alum Dre Davis was cast as Kimberly Brown. However, it was revealed that Davis will instead be playing Sara Harvey, a girl who went missing the same time as Alison. It was announced on April 21, 2015, that Troian Bellisario's real life best friend Lulu Brud Zsebe would appear on the show as Sabrina, which Bellisario commented "It's a pinch me I'm dreaming scenario."

On April 24, 2015, it was announced that actor Titus Makin Jr. had joined the cast, as his audition playing Lorenzo was leaked, however on May 27, 2015, it was announced that Travis Winfrey will be the one playing Lorenzo, who will be a cop assigned to watch over Alison and also her new love interest. On May 28, 2015, Titus revealed on Twitter that he is going to play Clark Wilkins.

For the second half of the season, several castings was announced, and will appear after the five-year time jump. On June 24, 2015, it was announced that two male recurring characters will be introduced in the second half of the season. The description of the characters was a sophisticated-yet-approachable 27-year-old working in the fashion industry named Jordan, and Liam, a 24-year-old editorial assistant from Boston. It was later announced that Roberto Aguire was cast as Liam Greene, Aria's new boyfriend, and that Australian actor David Coussins will recur as Jordan, Hanna's fiancé. On July 21, 2015, it was announced that one more recurring character will be introduced, the smart and sleek Yvonne, a politician's daughter who will cause some major drama for one of the Liars. It was later announced that Kara Royster will play Yvonne Phillips, Toby's new love interest, first appearing in the fourteenth episode. It was reported by TVLine on June 23, 2015, that Blake Berris will appear in one episode in the second half of the season. Kara Royster was cast as Yvonne, a friend of the character Toby. She will play a recurring role and will appear in three episodes starting with the 14th episode.

=== Writing ===
Executive producer Oliver Goldstick revealed in an interview that the first half of the sixth season would contain 10 episodes instead of 12, like the previous seasons, and would deal almost exclusively with the mystery of Charles DiLaurentis and every unanswered "A" mystery question since the start of the show. King said that "This is our chance to finally end this great and wonderful story." In an interview I. Marlene King said that the sixth season will deal with the mystery of Charles DiLaurentis and the "A" mystery. She confirmed that a time jump to after college will be included, and will happen after the first ten episodes. King also confirmed that the sixth season will include the liars graduating from high school.

In an interview with Entertainment Online, King said that the sixth season "is about answers and closure for all of them. It is an ending to the story that we started so long ago, but it's a very fast-paced ending to the story." As a regard to the first 10 episodes of the season, executive producer Joseph Dougherty said that they "are going to be like nothing that's ever happened before on this series. It's an incredible amount of information in every episode, but if we've done the job completely right, you should be able to figure the mystery out just before you find out."

=== Promotion ===
ABC Family promoted the sixth season by creating an online contest in which fans of the show could be a part of the marketing campaign to promote the show by sending in their art for consideration. After the fifth-season finale, fans could send their art to a website, where they would be given a chance to be used in ABC Family's summer ad and campaign. More than 3,100 submissions was sent in, and the winner was picked out and was included in the cover of Seventeen on May 21, 2015. ABC Family promoted the season by calling it "Summer of Answers". For the second part of the season, ABC Family released a promotional poster on December 15, 2015, with the new-launched name for the network, "Freeform".

=== Leaks ===
On July 18, 2015, a handful of information regarding the mid-season finale including the reveal of 'A' was allegedly leaked on Reddit. The person behind the account claimed to have been fired after being a PA at the set of Pretty Little Liars after failing a drug test, and could therefore reveal information about the show. Showrunner I. Marlene King took to Instagram, where she posted a picture and reassured the audience that the claims were false and that the identity of 'A' had not been leaked. ABC Family responded to the leaks, stating, "All of the info on the site is false. No crew member was fired from PLL and we believe it is just a fan spreading incorrect information to rile up the fan base."

== Reception ==
The sixth season was met with positive reviews from critics. The season premiere was down from the previous premiere and down from the season five finale, with a 1.1 at the target 18–49 demographic and 2.38 total viewers, making it the least watched season premiere in the show's history.

=== Live + SD ratings ===
No. in series	No. in season	Episode	Air date	Time slot (EST)	Rating/Share (18–49)	Viewers (m)	Rank (18-49)
121	1	"Game On, Charles"	June 2, 2015	Tuesdays; 8:00 p.m.	1.1	2.38	4
122	2	"Songs of Innocence"	June 9, 2015	Tuesdays; 8:00 p.m.	1.0	2.13	1
123	3	"Songs of Experience"	June 16, 2015	Tuesdays; 8:00 p.m.	0.7	1.74	6
124	4	"Don't Look Now"	June 23, 2015	Tuesdays; 8:00 p.m.	0.8	1.84	7
125	5	"She's No Angel"	June 30, 2015	Tuesdays; 8:00 p.m.	0.8	1.80	5
126	6	"No Stone Unturned"	July 14, 2015	Tuesdays; 8:00 p.m.	0.8	1.70	6
127	7	"O Brother, Where Art Thou"	July 21, 2015	Tuesdays; 8:00 p.m.	0.8	1.77	6
128	8	"FrAmed"	July 28, 2015	Tuesdays; 8:00 p.m.	0.7	1.58	10
129	9	"Last Dance"	August 4, 2015	Tuesdays; 8:00 p.m.	0.8	2.03	7
130	10	"Game Over, Charles"	August 11, 2015	Tuesdays; 8:00 p.m.	1.4	3.09	1
131	11	"Of Late I Think of Rosewood"	January 12, 2016	Tuesdays; 8:00 p.m.	1.1	2.25	1
132	12	"Charlotte's Web"	January 19, 2016	Tuesdays; 8:00 p.m.	0.8	1.66	10
133	13	"The Gloves Are On"	January 26, 2016	Tuesdays; 8:00 p.m.	0.8	1.65	11
134	14	"New Guys, New Lies"	February 2, 2016	Tuesdays; 8:00 p.m.	0.6	1.39	19
135	15	"Do Not Disturb"	February 9, 2016	Tuesdays; 8:00 p.m.	0.6	1.22	26
136	16	"Where Somebody Waits For Me"	February 16, 2016	Tuesdays; 8:00 p.m.	0.7	1.36	15
137	17	"We've All Got Baggage"	February 23, 2016	Tuesdays; 8:00 p.m.	0.6	1.27	16
138	18	"Burn This"	March 1, 2016	Tuesdays; 8:00 p.m.	0.6	1.45	12
139	19	"Did You Miss Me?"	March 8, 2016	Tuesdays; 8:00 p.m.	0.7	1.76	3
140	20	"Hush, Hush, Sweet Liars"	March 15, 2016	Tuesdays; 8:00 p.m.	0.6	1.19	1

== DVD release ==
The Complete Sixth Season
Set details			Special features
21 episodes (including the special "5 Years Forward"); 930 minutes (Region 1); 5-disc set; 1.85:1 aspect ratio; Languages: English (Dolby Digital 2.0 Surround); Subtitles: English, French and Spanish (Region 1)			Deleted scenes; "We Heart the PLL Ships"; "A PLL Prom"; "Inside the 5 Years"; "A Homecoming: The PLLs Return"
Release dates			Deleted scenes; "We Heart the PLL Ships"; "A PLL Prom"; "Inside the 5 Years"; "A Homecoming: The PLLs Return"
United States	United Kingdom	Australia	Deleted scenes; "We Heart the PLL Ships"; "A PLL Prom"; "Inside the 5 Years"; "A Homecoming: The PLLs Return"
April 19, 2016	—N/a	—N/a	Deleted scenes; "We Heart the PLL Ships"; "A PLL Prom"; "Inside the 5 Years"; "A Homecoming: The PLLs Return"
