= Winfrey =

Winfrey is a name. Notable people with the name include:

Surname

- Amy Winfrey (born 1974), American animator, screenwriter, songwriter, and voice actress
- Bill Winfrey (1916–1994), American Hall of Fame Thoroughbred racehorse trainer
- Chuck Winfrey (born 1949), former linebacker in the National Football League
- Oprah Winfrey (born 1954), American media proprietor, talk show host, actress, producer, and philanthropist
- Perrion Winfrey (born 2000), American football player
- Richard Winfrey (1858–1944), British Liberal politician, newspaper publisher and campaigner for agricultural rights
- Travis Winfrey (born 1981), American actor

Given name

- Winfrey Sanderson (born 1937), retired American college basketball coach
