= Game On, Charles =

- Pretty Little Liars episode
- Aria, Hanna, Emily and Spencer are put in a morgue after Charles drugged them when they came back to the dollhouse.
- Episode no.: Season 6 Episode 1
- Directed by: Chad Lowe
- Story by: I. Marlene King
- Teleplay by: I. Marlene King; Lijah J. Barasz
- Original air date: June 2, 2015
- Running time: 43 minutes

Guest appearances
- Jim Titus as Barry Maple; Dre Davis as Sara Harvey; Andrea Parker as Jessica DiLaurentis; Melanie Moreno as Cindy; Monica Moreno as Mindy

Episode chronology
← Previous "Welcome to the Dollhouse"	Next → "Songs of Innocence"
- Pretty Little Liars season 6

"Game On, Charles" is the first episode of the sixth season of the American mystery drama television series Pretty Little Liars, and is the 121st episode overall. It originally aired on June 2, 2015, ABC Family and serves as the season premiere of the sixth season. The episode was directed by Chad Lowe and was written by showrunner I. Marlene King and Lijah J. Barasz.

In the episode, Aria, Emily, Hanna, Spencer and Mona are let back into the dollhouse, and are trapped by 'A' for over three weeks and are subjected to unseen consequences trapped. After being let out of their rooms, the Liars plan to escape the dollhouse. Meanwhile, back home in Rosewood, Ezra, Toby, Caleb and Alison tries their best to find the girls as they try to contact 'A' and get directions to the dollhouse, in addition to keeping the police away from their plan.

"Game On, Charles" was watched by 2.38 million viewers and garnered a 1.1 rating, down from the previous episode, the fifth-season finale, and down 13 percent from the fifth-season premiere a year ago. The episode was met with positive reviews from television critics as many were pleased with the darker tone the show had developed. In addition, many felt satisfied with the story line's much needed progression in regards to the 'A' mystery.

== Plot ==
As Aria (Lucy Hale), Emily (Shay Mitchell), Hanna (Ashley Benson), Spencer (Troian Bellisario) and Mona (Janel Parrish) try to escape 'A's dollhouse, they are seen by an unknown girl in a yellow top who has been staying in the dollhouse for a long period of time. The girls are locked outside the dollhouse for two days without food or water until they are let back in by Charles. However, Charles attacks the Liars inside the dollhouse, drugs them and puts them in a morgue. When they are ordered to go back to their rooms, the Liars are subjected to more torture over the next three weeks.

Back in Rosewood, after three weeks of the girls being missing, Alison (Sasha Pieterse) delivers a statement at a press conference where she blames Andrew for the kidnapping. However, it turns out that the press conference is part of a plan to lure 'A' to Alison. Ali evades the police and, with the help of Ezra (Ian Harding), Caleb (Tyler Blackburn) and Toby (Keegan Allen), distracts them so 'A' can come after Ali.

After weeks of 'A's' torture, the Liars emerge from their rooms, traumatized over what they have gone through and are instructed to prepare Ali's room for her "arrival." As they sort through the boxes, they discover that Charles is a DiLaurentis and that Mona has been trapped for the last few weeks. After Hanna finds a newspaper where they are informed of how their disappearance has taken a toll on their families who are holding onto very little hope, the girls become even more determined to escape. During the nightly power outage, the Liars sneak into Charles' vault and set it on fire to punish Charles. After seeing the devastated damages the fire creates inside his vault, Charles pulls the fire alarm to extinguish the fire.

When trying to locate the girls, Alison is instructed by 'A' to drive to a location with a car 'A' has provided. 'A' leads Ali to Tyler State Park, and Ezra and Caleb arrive shortly after following her with a GPS. 'A' spies on Alison via monitors as she arrives close to the dollhouse, but Ezra and Caleb catch up to Ali shortly afterwards. Ali, and the boys hear the bells of the alarm and spot trails of smoke coming from underground. The Liars race through the corridor and find a completely unraveled Mona trapped in a hole and rescue her. Ali, Ezra, and Caleb find a locked door and open it just as all the girls come running out. Lieutenant Tanner (Roma Maffia) and the police arrive not long after just as the Liars are reunited with their loved ones.

The police examines the dollhouse, but don't find any trail of Charles. One of the cops finds another girl with a yellow top in the dollhouse who claims to be Sara Harvey, (Dre Davis) the girl who went missing the day after Alison as the Liars previously found out from Sara's friends. Spencer tells Toby that they know what the real name of 'A' is and Toby tells her that the police suspect that Andrew is their tormentor, and Emily asks Ali if she knows who Charles DiLaurentis is.

== Production ==
"Game On, Charles" was written by I. Marlene King and Lijah J. Barasz, and was directed by Chad Lowe. Barasz revealed that she wrote the parts outside 'A's dollhouse, with King writing the scenes in which the Liars are inside the dollhouse. The title of the premiere, "Game On, Charles", was revealed by King after the fifth-season finale. The table read for the premiere began on March 23, 2015. Filming for the sixth season began on March 24, 2015, and ended on April 1, 2015. The episode featured the songs "Don't Fence Me In" by Cole Porter, "Don't Sit Under the Apple Tree" by Glenn Miller, "Walkin' After Midnight" by Patsy Cline and "Hush, Little Baby" which was sung by Janel Parrish. The episode focuses on the Liars' captivity in the dollhouse where they are being trapped for over three weeks. It also focuses on Ezra, Caleb, Toby and Alison as they try their hardest to try to locate the girls.

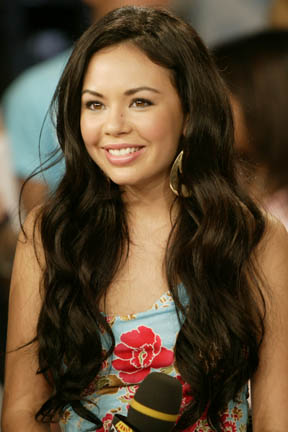
Janel Parrish confirmed to return as a series regular in Season 6.

Janel Parrish confirmed in an interview that she would be returning to the sixth season as a series regular after her character, Mona Vanderwaal, was supposedly killed in the mid-season finale of season 5. In previous episode, the fifth-season finale, it was revealed that Mona was alive and had been held prisoner in 'A's dollhouse. It was announced on March 25, 2015, that Project Runway alum Dre Davis was cast as Kimberly Brown. However, it was revealed that Davis would instead be playing Sara Harvey, a girl who went missing the same time as Alison. Titus Makin Jr. was announced to be cast as Lorenzo, a cop assigned to watch over Alison and also her new boyfriend.

Executive producer Oliver Goldstick revealed in an interview that the first half of the sixth season, would contain 10 episodes instead of 12, like the previous seasons and will deal almost exclusively with the mystery of Charles DiLaurentis and every unanswered "A" mystery question since the start of the show. I. Marlene King commented on where the premiere would begin as she said "We will start next season right were we left off, with the girls trapped and they don't get out immediately," King previews, adding that "season six takes place in a very condensed period of time." In an interview with Entertainment Tonight King commented on the first part of the sixth season and the premiere, as she said "It gets as dark as we could possibly go on Pretty Little Liars,"

As a regard to who 'A' is going to be, King said "We knew that Mona was the original "A," but we didn't know how long we were going to be able to go to sustain that story before we gave her up to the audience. We knew there was going to be a "Big A" to follow that story up, and we stayed true to those characters." King revealed in an interview with BuzzFeed that because of the frustration from the audience, the final 'A' reveal was moved from the series finale to the sixth season mid-season finale. She continued saying that "The fans have been really patient, and I feel like we pushed them as far as we could." The story of Charles was pitched by King to the writer's room after the end of the second season, after the reveal of Mona as 'A'. King said -

As we were ending that story, I started to freak out. I was like, I don’t want to write one more episode without knowing who was going to steal the game from her. I will say that for two or three episodes, there were three people who were going to be ‘A,’ and then we got about two episodes in and I pitched to the room this new idea that it wasn’t any of those three and I told the story of Charles and everybody’s mouths dropped. - I. Marlene King to BuzzFeed

Joseph Dougherty, executive producer, expressed his concern over the amount of material the writers had to deal with in the first half of the sixth season in order to reveal who 'A' is when crafting the first ten episodes. He continued to call the season four finale "the previous high-water mark for maximum signal-to-noise information."

== Reception ==
=== Broadcasting ===
"Game On, Charles" premiered on ABC Family on June 2, 2015. It was watched by 2.38 million viewers and acquired a 1.1 rating in the 18-49 key demographic, making it the least watched season premiere in the show's history. It was down from the previous episode, the fifth-season finale which was watched by 2.65 million people. The premiere was down from the previous season premiere, "Escape from New York", with a decrease of 12.64 percent in total viewers and 4.5 percent decrease in the 18-49 demographic.

The episode was the 121st consecutive number one telecast for the series in the Females 12-34 demographic with a 2.4 rating (translating to 1.1 million viewers), as well as the 73rd in Adults 18-34, 80th in Women 18-34 and 84th in Viewers 12-34. The premiere was also the number 1 scripted telecast on all cable TV in the 18-49 key demographic with a 1.1 rating, as it translates into 1.3 million viewers. The episode also generated over 1 million tweets, which helped contribute to the show accounting over 110 million tweets since its debut in June 2010. The show also became Twitter's number one scripted cable TV series telecast of all time.

=== Reviews ===
The episode received mixed to positive reviews by critics. Many critics were pleased with the premiere, with many commenting on the focus of the girls finding out who 'A' really is. Mark Trammell from TVEquals called the premiere a "solid enough premiere" and expressed his excitement of how the fallout of the events in the premiere will affect the rest of the season. Kelsey from Melty called the premiere "astonishing".

Gavin Hetherington of SpoilerTV cited this episode as the best premiere of the show to date. He called it a "stellar premiere" and went on to say the episode was "filled with great moments - both terrifying and satisfying - and showed the girls really start to take control and fight back." Writing for Entertainment Weekly Isabella Biedenharn mentioned the shows darker tone as he said "PLL has always been sort of terrifying, but this episode approached horror movie levels." She continued saying that the premiere raised many questions as she commented "This season’s shaping up to be a doozy."

Paul Dailly from TV Fanatics praised the actresses performance as he said "This tested all of their acting chops on a scale never seen on this show before. Did anyone else just want to hug Mona?" He was more negative towards the episode itself as he said ""Game on, Charles" was a rather disappointing affair. Considering the episode order has been shaved this season, they really could have fit a lot more in. As much as I love the sarcasm of the girls, some of that could have been traded in for some more answers. Yes, we need those when we are six seasons in."

Nick Campbell from TV.com gave a negative review as he was critical towards the show's realistic plot as she said "There's a lot that happened in that last scene that's hard to swallow if you're still the kind of viewer that wanted things to make sense. I don't blame you. You're only human. But this show has no interest in being realistic anymore." Jessica Goldstein from Vulture gave the premiere 3/5 as she also commented on the show's realistic plot as she said "This show is 100 percent illogical. I am not entirely sure anything that transpired in Tuesday night’s episode made sense, like even a little sense, like, “Oh, I guess if you look at it in this convoluted way, from a weird angle, and don’t ask too many questions, then it kind of makes ... ” sense.
