= Miss Me x 100 =

- Pretty Little Liars episode
- The Liars and their significant others watching the police conference about the discovery in Alison's grave.
- Episode no.: Season 5 Episode 5
- Directed by: Norman Buckley
- Written by: I. Marlene King
- Cinematography by: Larry Reibman
- Editing by: Lois Blumenthal
- Original air date: July 8, 2014
- Running time: 43 minutes

Guest appearances
- Keegan Allen as Toby Cavanaugh; Lesley Fera as Veronica Hastings; Brendan Robinson as Lucas Gottesman; Luke Kleintank as Travis Hobbs; Chloe Bridges as Sydney Driscoll; Tammin Sursok as Jenna Marshall; Lindsey Shaw as Paige McCullers; Melanie Moreno as Cindy; Monica Moreno as Mindy

Episode chronology
← Previous "Thrown from the Ride"	Next → "Run, Ali, Run"
- Pretty Little Liars season 5

"Miss Me x 100" is the fifth episode of the fifth season and the one-hundredth episode overall of the ABC Family mystery drama television series Pretty Little Liars. The episode, serving as the special 100th episode, was broadcast on July 8, 2014. It was directed by Norman Buckley and written by showrunner I. Marlene King, and features the return of Tyler Blackburn as Caleb Rivers, his first episode since leaving the show in the fourth season for its sister show Ravenswood. In addition, Tammin Sursok returned to the show as Jenna Marshall, having last been seen in the ninth episode of the fourth season.

In the episode, its Alison's first day back at Rosewood High since her disappearance with the help of the girls, but she is met by protesters led by Mona. Meanwhile, Spencer's parents decide to get a divorce, Caleb returns to Rosewood, Emily and Alison confront their feelings to each other and Aria heals her relationship with Ezra. The episode also saw the epic return of 'A' after believing to be gone since the fifth-season premiere. The episode premiered to an audience of 2.25 million viewers, up from the previous episode, and garnered a 1.0 rating in the 18-49 demographic. The episode received critical acclaim from television critics, as many were pleased with the episode, and found it fitting for the landmark 100th episode.

== Plot ==
The day has finally arrived for Alison's first day back at Rosewood High, however, neither the girls nor Alison are ready for it. Determined to put on a brave face, Alison returns to also help heal the damage she did years ago. While Spencer's family thought that Mrs. Hastings was at a spa, really she was having a private investigator finding out that Mr. Hastings and Melissa weren't at a dinner as they said. Mrs. Hastings is leaving town alone after a failed attempt to bring Spencer. Aria still suffers from the accident in New York and meets the returning Jenna, who is still grieving for her beloved's death. Mona prepares her "army of losers" for the upcoming war against Ali. Their confrontation escalates into a slap fight. Although Ali wins the fight, it ultimately ends in Mona's favor.

Meanwhile, Caleb returns to Rosewood and leaves Hanna confused for the reason of his homecoming. Emily and Alison share a kiss along with Ezra and Aria. In the end, while the police are giving an interview about the dead girl in Ali's grave, "A" makes a triumphant return to Rosewood by planting a bomb in Toby's house and making the entire house explode. It is not known whether Jenna was in the house at the time of the explosion. The Liars are left shocked, as "A" moves into her new lair, which contains the Black Widow costume worn by her assistant and the Dollhouse, as well as multiple other "A" items.

== Production ==
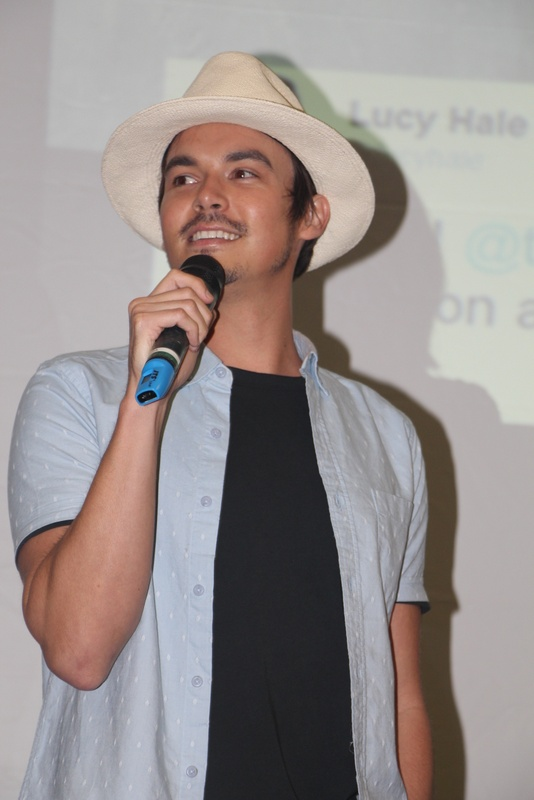
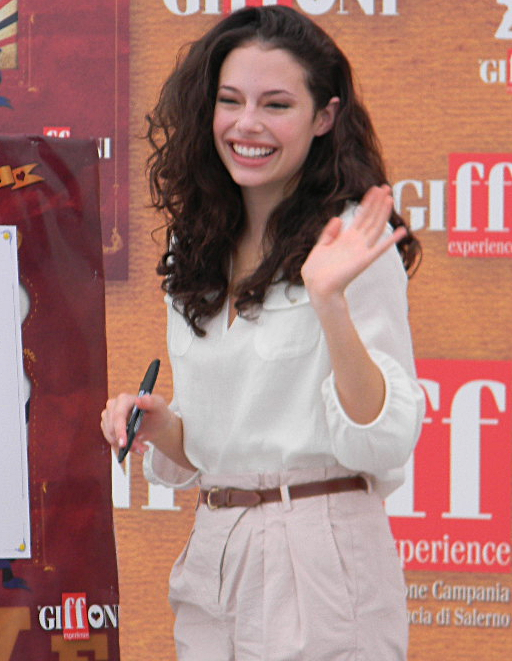
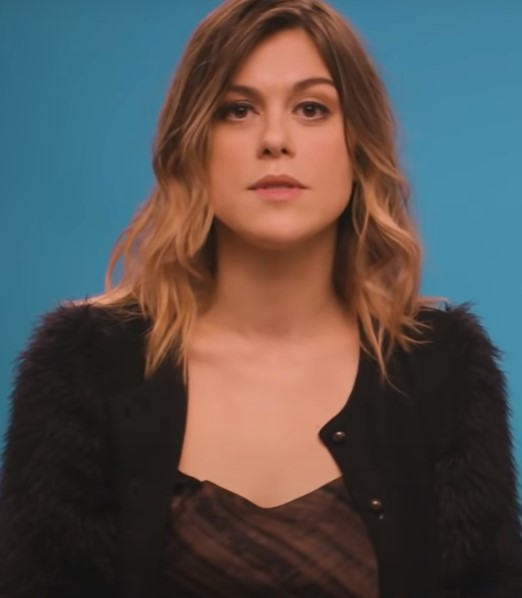
Tyler Blackburn, Chloe Bridges and Lindsey Shaw (left to right) portray Caleb Rivers, Sydney Driscoll and Paige McCullers, respectively. This episode marks Blackburn's return to the show after leaving in the fourth season.

"Miss Me x 100" was written by I. Marlene King and directed by Norman Buckley, serving as King's second writing credit for the season. The table read for the episode began on April 28, 2014. Filming commenced two days later on April 30, 2014, and ended on May 22, 2014. The episode featured the songs "Begin Again" by Rachel Platten, "Fuel to Fire" by Agnes Obel, "Thunder Clatter" by Wild Cub, "Every Breath You Take" by Denmark + Winter and "I Don't Deserve You" by Paul Van Dyk featuring Plumb. The episode focuses on Alison's first day back at Rosewood High and everyone's reaction of her return. In addition, the person in Alison's grave is revealed, and both Caleb and Jenna returns to Rosewood.

On March 12, 2014, it was announced that Tyler Blackburn would be returning as a series regular on the show after leaving halfway through the fourth season for the sister show; Ravenswood, and would return in the 100th episode. Tammin Sursok was reported to return to the show in the 100th episode. Her character hadn't been seen since the ninth episode of season four. The cast of the show celebrated the 100th episode with a large party, contributed by ABC Family on June 2, 2015.

== Reception ==
=== Broadcasting ===
"Miss Me x 100" premiered on ABC Family on July 8, 2014. It was watched by 2.25 million viewers and acquired a 1.0 rating in the 18-49 demographic. It was the most watched episode since the season five premiere, rising from the previous episode. The episode was the 100th consecutive number one telecast for the series in the Females 12-34 demographic with a 2.5 rating (translating to 1.2 million viewers), as well as the 55th number one telecast in the Women 18-49 demographic with a 1.6 rating (1.0 million viewers).
