= Pacific Resident Theatre =

American theatre company, founded 1985

- Interactive map of Pacific Resident Theatre
- Address: 703 Venice Boulevard; Venice, California; United States of America
- Coordinates: 33.9915°N 118.4580°W

Website
- pacificresidenttheatre.org

Pacific Resident Theatre (PRT) is a 501(c)(3) non-profit theatre company located at 703 Venice Boulevard in Venice, California. It was founded as an actors cooperative in Venice's arts district in 1985 and is dedicated to producing both classic and little known plays, as well as works by new authors. As of June 2012, the company had received over 90 awards, including NAACP Image Awards, 73 (as of 2013) Los Angeles Drama Critics Circle Awards. and the since-retired LA Weekly Theater Awards (defunct 2014), Drama-Logue Awards (defunct 1998) and Back Stage West Garland Awards (defunct 2009).

Production history

1985

- Thanksgiving by Jim McClure
- Happy End by Bertolt Brecht

1986–87

- The Hot L Baltimore by Lanford Wilson
- The Importance of Being Earnest by Oscar Wilde

1987

- Slaughterhouse on Tanner's Close by Daniel O'Connor
- June Second adapted from William Faulkner's "The Sound and the Fury"

1988

- Romanoffs by R.C. Morris & T. R. Oglesby
- South Central Rain by Jamie Baker
- The Long Christmas Dinner by Thornton Wilder

1989

- The Blue Dahlia by Raymond Chandler, adaptation by Daniel O'Connor
- The Merry Wives of Windsor by William Shakespeare
- The Long Christmas Dinner by Thornton Wilder

1990

- The Beggar's Opera by John Gay
- The Long Christmas Dinner by Thornton Wilder

1991

- The Long Christmas Dinner by Thornton Wilder
- Aliens by Steven Morris
- When Will I Dance by Claire Braz Valentine
- Alice in Wonderland adapted by Andre Gregory and the Manhattan Theatre Project
- Camino Real by Tennessee Williams

1992–93

- Under the Gaslight by Augustin Daly
- Stories of the Season by Robert Alan Beuth and George Harrison
- Sitting Man by Carol Kaplan
- Barbarians by Maxim Gorki

1993–94

- Ondine by Jean Giraudoux
- Come Good Rain by George Seremba
- Boo! An Evening of Ghost Stories by PRT and the L.A. Directors Project
- Stories of the Season by Robert Alan Beuth and George Harrison
- The Visit by Friedrich Duerrenmatt

1995

- There's One in Every Marriage by Georges Feydeau
- Southern Girls by Sheri Bailey and Dura Temple
- A Christmas Carol by Charles Dickens, Adaptation by Orson Bean

1996–97

- Mrs. Warren's Profession by George Bernard Shaw
- The Playboy of the Western World by J. M. Synge
- Angel City by Sam Shepard
- Golden Boy by Clifford Odets

1997–98

- Quick Change Room by Nagle Jackson
- Ardele by Jean Anouilh
- Scotland Road by Jeffrey Hatcher
- Christmas Memory/ One Christmas by Truman Capote
- Ivanov by Anton Chekhov
- Candida by George Bernard Shaw
- A Time Trilogy 3 Evenings With Paul Linke

1998–99

- Lulu by Frank Wedekind
- The Master Builder by Henrik Ibsen
- Indiscretions by Jean Cocteau
- Divorcons by Emile de Najac & Victorien Sardou
- A Christmas Carol by Charles Dickens, Adaptation by Orson Bean
- Christmas Memory/ One Christmas by Truman Capote

1999–2000

- The Swan by Ferenc Molnár
- Otherwise Engaged by Simon Gray
- A Question of Mercy by David Rabe
- Tonight at 8.30 by Noel Coward
- Children Suggested by a short story by John Cheever
- A Time Trilogy 3 Evenings With Paul Linke

2000–01

- Lady Chatterley's Lover by D. H. Lawrence, adapted by John Vreeke and Mary Machala
- The Killing of Sister George by Frank Marcus
- The Scarecrow by Percy MacKaye
- Every Day Life by Rainer Maria Rilke

2001–02

- Anna Christie by Eugene O’Neill
- On Approval by Frederick Lonsdale
- Betrayal by Harold Pinter
- Big Love by Charles L. Mee

2002–03

- A Delicate Balance by Edward Albee
- Orpheus Descending by Tennessee Williams
- Prelude to a Kiss by Stan Roth
- Rocket to the Moon by Clifford Odets

2004–05

- Happy End by Bertolt Brecht
- When they Speak of Rita by Daisy Foote
- The Blue Dahlia by Raymond Chandler, Adapted by Dan O'Connor
- The Turn of the Screw by Henry James
- Death of a Salesman by Arthur Miller
- Of Mice and Men by John Steinbeck

2006–07

- The 60s by Trish Soodik
- Anatol by Arthur Schnitzler
- The Hasty Heart by John Patrick
- Alice Sit-by-the-Fire by J. M. Barrie
- Hogan's Goat by William Alfred
- Keeping Faith by Alex Peabody

2008–09

- Lions by Vince Melocchi
- Fata Morgana by Ernest Vajda
- The Time of Your Life by William Saroyan
- My Ántonia by Scott Schwartz, Based on the novel by Willa Cather
- Hamlet or Does Father Reeeally Know Best? Adapted from Shakespeare's play by Nancy Linehan Charles

2009–10

- Becky's New Car by Steven Dietz
- Wild Boy by Oliver Goldstick
- The Browning Version by Terence Rattigan
- Loyalties by Tony Pasqualini
- Saint Joan of the Slaughterhouses by Bertolt Brecht

2011–12

- The Secrets of the Trade by Jonathan Tolins
- The Indians are Coming to Dinner by Jennifer W. Rowland
- Barrie: Back to Back, an Evening of Plays by J. M. Barrie
- Julia by Vince Melocchi
