= Sara Harvey (Pretty Little Liars) =

Fictional character from the Pretty Little Liars television series

- Pretty Little Liars character
- Dre Davis as Sara Harvey
- First appearance: "A Dangerous Game" (Season 3, Episode 24)
- Last appearance: "Original G'A'ngsters" (Season 7, Episode 7)
- Created by: I. Marlene King
- Portrayed by: Sasha Pieterse (season 3); CC Mason (season 4); Dre Davis (Seasons 6–7)

In-universe information
- Aliases: "A" (Note: She signed the card to Bethany's parents as "A".); Alison DiLaurentis (Note: In the Dollhouse, Sara pretended to be Alison.); Red Coat; The Black Widow; Friend and ally (Note: Uses this name while communicating with Charlotte on her birthday.)
- Nicknames: That Freaky Woman; The Woman in Black Shower Harvey
- Gender: Female
- Occupation: A Red Coat; The Black Widow
- Family: Mr. Harvey (father); Mrs. Harvey (mother)
- Significant other: Emily Fields (ex-girlfriend)
- Residence: Rosewood, Pennsylvania; Courtland (previously)
- Status: Deceased
- Seasons: 3–4, 6–7

Sara Harvey is a fictional character in the Freeform television series adaptation of the Pretty Little Liars book series. She is portrayed by model Dre Davis. Sara is introduced as a false protagonist, only to be exposed as "Big A's" ally during "Game Over, Charles". Sara is murdered in "Wanted: Dead or Alive" by an unknown assailant and found dead in her hotel room's bathtub by a cleaner. Sara's killer was revealed to be Noel Kahn during "These Boots Were Made for Stalking".

== Casting ==
Prior to her introduction in Season 6, Sara was previously portrayed by stunt double CC Mason during her scene in the Black Widow costume, as well as by Sasha Pieterse for her scenes as Red Coat in the third-season finale. An unnamed stock photo woman was used for the photographs of Sara in the fourth season.

On March 25, 2015, it was announced that Project Runway alum Dre Davis was cast as Kimberly Brown, the false casting name created to conceal Sara's true identity. The actress originally posted a photo of herself wearing a yellow top similar to the one Ali and Bethany were wearing the night of Bethany's death, causing amongst critics and Pretty Little Liars fans alike speculation that she could be portraying Bethany. In an interview with AfterEllen.com, Davis revealed she had to audition with two scenes—with one of them being a kissing scene leading to speculation that she'd be a romantic interest for Emily Fields, as the other Liars currently had love interests at the time.

== Development ==
=== Characterization and introduction ===
"She was pretty, poised and perfect and everything she gave you, she took two things away. I mean she's gone but she's not "gone". And we can't get away from her and I'm so tired of being Sara's friend, it just sucks the life out of you."

— Claire, on Sara's personality.

The character was first mentioned in "Who's In The Box?", when Hanna Marin is searching for girls who, not only looked similar to Alison DiLaurentis, but also went missing around the same time. In the same episode, Hanna and Emily Fields meet up with Sara's former friends, Claire and Tina. Marin and Field pose them questions in an attempt to learn more about Harvey's past. Claire has mixed feelings about Sara, and is envious of Alison's presumed death. She further confesses to have wished for Harvey's death prior to her disappearance. During the sixth season premiere, "Game On, Charles", Sara makes her first physical appearance at Charlotte Drake's Dollhouse, having allegedly been there for two years.

=== Personality ===
Before "A" abducted Sara to an underground bunker, she was described by her entourage of friends as a toxic presence in their lives. While being held in captivity, she became somewhat vulnerable. Harvey also displays fear of being touched by anyone as seen in "Songs of Experience" when Emily reaches out to comfort her and Sara shies away in response. After moving in to the Fields household, Harvey is seen to be less afraid and more open to social interactions with other people. She's also more playful as evidenced by her agreeing to have a night swim with Emily in the community pool as well as her suggestion to get tattoos.

In "Game Over, Charles, it is revealed that Sara had been working all along with Charlotte under the disguises of both Red Coat and Black Widow. This sheds light on the fact that Sara's earlier interactions with Emily and the other Liars were just a facade to lure the girls into complacency. Harvey is shown to have acted the part of an abused captivity victim when in actual fact, she was seemingly working with "A" out of her own free will. In contrast to her previous persona, Sara is duplicitous in nature as she played on the Liars' sympathies for her plight to stop them from questioning her and having suspicions. Furthermore, Harvey is also shown to be manipulative as she seeks out Emily and flirts with her to develop a relationship under the pre-tense of having feelings for her when it is implied that she did that to keep a close eye on the girls. This is also supported by the fact that Charlotte also took advantage of Sara's close proximity to the Liars to prevent them from telling Dr. Sullivan anything by threatening her safety.

However, Harvey tried to get Emily and the other Liars to leave Radley before Charlotte's explosion was scheduled to happen. This insinuates that her feelings for Emily may not have been all just an act. She reassures this in "Wanted: Dead or Alive", persuading Fields that she cares for her safety.

== Storylines ==
=== Background ===
Sara was one of the main antagonists during the series' third and fourth seasons, dressing up as a decoy Red Coat and the Black Widow.

At her local high school in Courtland, Sara Harvey was a popular girl who led her own clique. On the summer of 2009, Sara went missing and was last seen the day after Labor Day by one of her closest friends, Avery. It is unknown what happened to Sara or where she went. However, at some point in 2011, she became a member of the A-Team, after being hired by Charlotte DiLaurentis. Sara was dedicated to assisting Charlotte in being "A" and was willing to do anything for her, out of devotion for Charlotte taking care of her. She thought of them as being like sisters.

=== Season 3 ===
In "A DAngerous GAme", Charlotte, then known to the A-Team as Red Coat, sent Sara Harvey to pose as a decoy Red Coat at Thornhill, in order to distract the Liars and keep Mona occupied. Charlotte later mentions in "Game Over, Charles" that she kept seeing a blonde girl in a red coat watching over the Liars and deduced the mysterious entity was Alison. So in order to find out, Charlotte organized the lodge party to trap the girls and lure Alison out of hiding, since she knew her sister would only show up if her friends were in grave danger. Nigel Wright was paid to fake a flight plan to Delaware by Charlotte but the plane actually made its way to the lodge since Sara landed it in a nearby field despite the fog surrounding the area. Shana Fring also showed up with Jenna Marshall to find out if the Liars were going to meet Alison at the request of Melissa Hastings, since she too had her own suspicions. However, both plans went awry and while Jenna wasn't noticing, Shana set fire to the lodge since she grew a hatred towards the Liars for blinding Jenna as she later admits to in "Escape from New York". Sara and Charlotte managed to rescue Aria, Emily and Mona while Alison arrived just in time to save Hanna, giving Charlotte the much needed confirmation that her sister was indeed alive. Wilden was not too far from the Lodge and Charlotte killed him shortly after since he would've never allowed Alison to return to Rosewood; most likely because all his illegal activities would have been revealed.

=== Season 4 ===
After killing Wilden, Charlotte sent Sara to attend his funeral during "'A' Is for A-l-i-v-e", dressed as the mysterious woman in a black veil to confirm he was dead.

In "Grave New World", the Liars discover that Alison is alive as they had suspected and dressing up as one of the Red Coat entities to hide from "A", which leads them to look for suspects for the identity of the mysterious Jane Doe buried in Alison's grave. During "Who's In The Box?". Hanna is researching girls who went missing around the same as Alison and comes upon Sara's website set up by her high school friends. Hanna contacts them and they meet up to discuss Sara. Her former best friend, Claire, states that their other friend Avery last saw Sara on Labor Day. Later, Claire divulges to Emily that she had secretly wished for Sara to die even prior to her disappearance because of how horrible of a person she was. Claire says that if Sara gave you something, she in turn took two things away.

=== Season 5 ===
After it is revealed during "Miss Me x 100" that Bethany Young is the person buried in Alison's grave, Charlotte sends Sara to gift Bethany's parents a card and flowers, while wearing her black veil disguise.

=== Season 6 ===
In "Game On, Charles", a young blonde girl is seen throughout the episode in "A's" dollhouse wearing the infamous yellow top that Alison and Bethany were both buried in. The anonymous figure first appears drawing on the wall of her captivity room and later carries out "Big A's" orders in delivering the girls food. The Liars manage to escape and the police arrive at the scene to find the blonde girl in her room. A police officer approaches her to ask for her identity and she reveals her name to be Sara Harvey. The Liars recognize her since they previously chatted to Sara's friends.

During "Songs of Innocence", Sara runs away from home to Emily's after her mom took her home from the hospital. Pam offers Sara to stay with the two for a while. Throughout the season, Sara and Emily develop a co-dependent romantic relationship with one another.

In FrAmed", Detective Linda Tanner is looking through security footage of the Art show the girls attended after Aria's photographs, that were meant to be put on display are switched with Photos of the girls from the Dollhouse. Tanner notices a figure dressed in black, whose face is never caught on camera but they are shown to have short blonde hair. This is believed to be Sara, since she was the only helper Charlotte had left that had hair like that.

In "Game Over, Charles", the Liars as well as Mona manage to break into a restricted room with Sara's aid who remembers a specific date meaningful to A. While the girls enter the room, Harvey suspiciously leaves them behind. As the Liars and Mona discover a hologram which monitors a live feed of Charlotte at Radley telling Alison her story, Sara sets up a bomb to detonate inside of the sanitarium as part of Charlotte's final plan to kill her family along with herself. Charlotte reveals Sara's role as The Black Widow and Red Coat to the Liars, much to the dismay of Emily. The Liars arrive in time to subdue Harvey, while Spencer disables the bomb. Charlotte flees to the roof to jump and Alison begs the Liars to help her stop Charlotte from jumping. Sara tries to escape but Emily grabs her hood and punches Harvey in the face for her betrayal. After Emily knocks her down, something happens to Sara, which puts her in the hospital.

Sara returns to Rosewood during "Of Late I Think of Rosewood" to attend Charlotte's funeral and decides to stick around town, which agitates the Liars since they suspect that she'll leave word about what happened to her at Radley all those years ago.

In "The Gloves Are On", Spencer confesses to Caleb that after Emily punched Sara, she got back up but accidentally put her hands on some electrical cords, which began electrocuting her body, as the Liars watched in shock. This left Harvey unable to use her hands. It is also divulged that after this event, Sara was diagnosed with Stockholm syndrome, having downgraded Charlotte at the court as a horrible person. However, Sara visits Alison at her job during "Do Not Disturb" and apologizes for lying under oath in order to reduce her criminal sentence, stating that she saw Charlotte as an older sister and mentor. Aria and Spencer break into her room at The Radley and find out that she's living in what was once Charlotte's old room while growing up in the infamous sanitarium. They then find a hole in the closet that leads to an underground floor with electric switchboards. The girls deduce those devices were used to torture Charlotte at Radley. They further investigate the alley, which in turn leads out of the Radley. A few days later, Alison, Emily and Hanna head to Sara's hotel room to investigate it as well, only to find out that the hole in the wall had been sealed.

During "Did You Miss Me?", Sara's helper goes to city hall to get a copy of The Radley's floor plan. He hands it in a tube to her as she suspiciously drives off. Later, Sara encounters Mona and tells her that no matter how many good deeds she does, none of the Liars are ever going to truly trust her. Adding salt to the wound, Sara states that without games, Mona will remain lonesome.

=== Season 7 ===
During "Along Comes Mary", Sara remains living in Rosewood and befriends Jenna Marshall. At the end of the episode, they are having drinks at The Radley when an unknown figure approaches the two and reveals themselves as Noel Kahn, who proceeds to join the duo.

Shortly after Emily Fields confronts Jenna about her connection to Charlotte in the following episode "Wanted: Dead or Alive", Sara seems to regret forming her newfound alliance with Jenna. Sara is later seen trying to escape from her room after packing her bags. When Harvey opened the door to leave, she was shocked to see someone she recognized on the other side. At the end of the episode, Sara is found dead and laying naked in her hotel room's bathtub by a cleaner.

During "The Wrath of Kahn", Hanna witnesses Noel disposing Sara Harvey's broken phone. He later takes it back when Hanna fails to prove that he's A.D., but warns her to be careful or else she'd end up like Sara.

In "These Boots Were Made for Stalking", Jenna walks into the police station in order to come clean about her actions and interrupts a conversation between Spencer and detective Marco Furey. Marshall reports that after the events that took place at the abandoned school for blind students, she opted to keep a low profile due to fear of being harmed by Noel. According to Jenna, Noel was accountable for Sara Harvey's homicide and she feared to be his next victim. Kahn recruited Jenna with the assertion that Charlotte left enough money in her will to afford Marshall another eye surgery. Nevertheless, Jenna suspected Noel of stealthily plotting to steal the cash all to himself since his parents had financially cut him off. In an attempt to spare her life, Marshall brought a gun to the deserted sight school as an act of self-defense and pretended to hold a grudge against the Liars. After Jenna describes her side of the story, Furey orders one of his associates to escort Marshall to a conference room so she can make an official statement. As Jenna exits the room, Spencer insists to Marco that she's an unreliable narrator but Furey informs her the authorities don't have any evidence against Marshall.

During "Till Death Do Us Part", Spencer's identical twin sister, Alex Drake, is revealed to be the elusive A.D. When Spencer questions Alex about Sara's involvement in the "A" game, she explains that Charlotte told Harvey she hid her greatest treasure at The Radley. Sara deduced it was money, when it was actually Mary's medical file that Spencer and Toby found in the underground alley beneath Sara's hotel room. Alex further clarifies that all Charlotte asked for was a family.

== Reception ==
The reveal of Sara Harvey as both the third Red Coat and Black Widow received a generally negative reception from fans and critics, with many of them expressing severe discontent over the writers for picking a character that was physically introduced so late into the series.
