= Travis Winfrey =

American actor

- Born: April 15, 1981 (age 45)
- Occupation: Actor
- Years active: 2006–present

Travis Winfrey is an actor, best known for playing Omar Kearse in the VH1 series Single Ladies.

== Filmography ==
=== Film ===
Year	Title	Role	Notes
2007	Path to Insanity	Mars/Lars	Video
2008	Beverly Hills Chihuahua	Deepak	
2009	Play the Game	Edna's Trainer	
2010	Miles Away	Miles	Short
2014	Daddy's Home	Ronald "R.C." Carr	TV movie
2017	Miss Me This Christmas	Kevin Boudreaux	
2017	You Can't Fight Christmas	Kevin Boudreaux	
2021	Cookie	-	Short

=== Television ===
Year	Title	Role	Notes
2006	Passions	Drunk Guy #1	Episode: "Episode #1.1754"
2006	Mad TV	White Chick Marlon Wayans	Episode: "Episode #12.3" & "#12.4"
2007	The Loop	Stride	Episode "Stride"
2007	Hannah Montana	Stage Manager	Episode "That's What Friends Are For?"
2007	Dexter	Reynolds	Episode "The Dark Defender"
2008	Mind of Mencia	Drummer	Episode: "Episode #4.6"
2008	Valentine	Ricky	Episode: "Pilot"
2009	The Secret Life of the American Teenager	Bad Looking Dude	Episode: "Money for Nothing, Chicks for Free"
2011	100 Greatest Songs of the 00s	Himself	Episode: "Part 1-5"
2011-15	Single Ladies	Omar Kearse	Main Cast
2015-16	Pretty Little Liars	Lorenzo Calderon	Recurring Cast: Season 6
2016	Here We Go Again	Cedric	Main Cast
2017	Being Mary Jane	Corey Blanchard	Episode "Getting Naked"
2019-22	The Family Business	Sebastian	Recurring Cast: Season 1-2 & 4, Guest: Season 3
2022	Kenan	Nick	Recurring Cast: Season 2
