= Lesley Fera =

American actress

- Born: Lesley Kathleen Fera; November 23, 1971 (age 54); California, U.S.
- Occupation: Actress
- Years active: 1995–present
- Spouse: Ned Mochel (m. 2012)

Lesley Fera (born November 23, 1971) is an American actress. She is best known for her role as Veronica Hastings on the ABC Family series Pretty Little Liars. Fera also had a recurring roles in 24, CSI: Miami and Southland, as well as performing in a number of theater productions. She launched a podcast to discuss Pretty Little Liars in 2020.

== Biography ==
A native Californian, Lesley is a lover of the stage, she is very active in L.A. theatre and has also enjoyed working at numerous regional theaters. She portrayed Veronica Hastings on Pretty Little Liars from 2010 to 2017.

== Filmography ==
=== Film ===
Year	Title	Role	Notes
2005	Herstory	Marly	
2017	The Lovers	Susan	
2017	Boone: The Bounty Hunter	Madam Sylvia	
2020	Seven Days	Stacey	

=== Television ===
Year	Title	Role	Notes
1998	3rd Rock from the Sun	Woman #2	"The Great Dickdater" (season 3: episode 13)
1999	Absence of the Good	Beth	Television film
2000	Titus	Paula	"Sex with Pudding" (season 1: episode 1)
2001	Gideon's Crossing	Janet Beckman	"The Crash" (season 1: episode 19)
2001	Strong Medicine	Anne	"Impaired" (season 2: episode 7)
2001	Thieves	Carla Patterson	"Home Is Where the Heist Is…" (season 1: episode 10)
2001	The Drew Carey Show	Judy	"Bus-ted" (season 7: episode 6)
2001	Citizen Baines	Eileen McGuire	"Out in the Rain" (season 1: episode 7)
2002	Judging Amy	Mrs. Moran	"Picture of Perfect" (season 4: episode 21)
2003	The Practice	A.D.A. Kate Barron	"We the People" (season 8: episode 1)
2004–10	CSI: Miami	Dr. Joyce Carmel	4 episodes Guest star (Seasons 2, 4, 5, 9)
2004	ER	Helen Kolber	"NICU" (season 10: episode 12)
2004	Medical Investigation	Gladys Halperin	"Coming Home" (season 1: episode 3)
2005	NYPD Blue	Debra Campo	"Sergeant Sipowicz' Lonely Hearts Club Band" (season:12 episode 17)
2006	Numb3rs	ATF Agent Annie Wilson	"Guns and Roses" (season 2: episode 20)
2006	Cold Case	Dana Taylor '04	"The War at Home" (season 4: episode 2)
2006–07	Justice	DA Jennifer Reese	2 episodes
2009–10	24	Angela Nelson	6 episodes Recurring role (Season 7) Guest Star (Season 8)
2009	Without a Trace	Cynthia	"Heartbeats" (season 7: episode 19)
2009	The Mentalist	Leslie Sloop	"Throwing Fire" (season 2: episode 10)
2010	Nip/Tuck	Daniella Creighton	"Christian Troy II" (season 6: episode 17)
2010	Criminal Minds	Leslie McBride	"The Fight" (season 5: episode 18)
2010–17	Pretty Little Liars	Veronica Hastings	53 episodes; Recurring role (Seasons 1–7)
2010	Detroit 1-8-7	Dr. Maya Ehrlich	"Shelter" (Season 1: episode 10)
2011	House M.D.	Kay	"Bombshells" (Season 7: episode 15)
2013	Southland	Sergeant Waters	4 episodes Recurring role (Season 5)
2013	Dating in LA and Other Urban Myths	Penelope	9 episodes Main role (Season 1)
2014	Stalker	Mrs. McCoy	"Whatever Happened to Baby James?" (Season 1: episode 2)
2017	Battle of the Network Stars	Herself	Contestant
2018	American Horror Story: Apocalypse	Cooperative Agent	Cameo, "The End" (Season 8: Episode 1)
2018	The Good Doctor	Nicole	"Tough Titmous" (Season 2: Episode 4)
2018	The Orville	Minister Theece	"Primal Urges" (Season 2: Episode 2)

=== Stage ===
Year	Title	Role	Location
1995–96	Noises Off	Poppy	Asolo Repertory Theatre
1996	The Life and Adventures of Nicholas Nickleby	Miss Knag (et al.)	Asolo Repertory Theatre
1997	The Children’s Hour	Martha	Provincetown Theater Foundation
1997	The Mousetrap	Mollie	Pennsylvania Centre Stage
1997	Misalliance	Hypatia	Pennsylvania Centre Stage
1998	A Sense of Place	Mary Tate	American Stage
1999	Communicating Doors	Poopay / Phoebe	San Jose Repertory Theatre
2000–01	Lady Chatterley’s Lover	Lady Chatterley	Pacific Resident Theatre
2002	Anna Christie	Anna Christie	Pacific Resident Theatre
2002–03	Big Love	Olympia	Pacific Resident Theatre
2004	Dealing With Clair		The Matrix Theatre Company
2005	Happy End	Lillian Holiday	Pacific Resident Theatre
2007	The Hasty Heart	Margaret	Pacific Resident Theatre
2011	Barrie: Back to Back	Mrs. Beatrice Page	Pacific Resident Theatre
2012	Our Town		The Eli and Edythe Broad Stage
2015	The Homecoming	Ruth	Pacific Resident Theatre
2016	Two Dollar Bill	Jessica McGovern	Pioneer Theatre Company
2016	Bull	Isobel	Rogue Machine Theatre
2016	Two Henrys		Pacific Resident Theatre
2017	Dinner with Friends		Pacific Resident Theatre
