= Dre Davis =

American basketball player

No. 14 – Maine Celtics
- Position: Shooting guard / small forward
- League: NBA G League

Personal information
- Born: August 23, 2001 (age 25) Indianapolis, Indiana, U.S.
- Listed height: 6 ft 6 in (1.98 m)
- Listed weight: 215 lb (98 kg)

Career information
- High school: Lawrence Central (Indianapolis, Indiana)
- College: Louisville (2020–2022); Seton Hall (2022–2024); Ole Miss (2024–2025)
- NBA draft: 2025: undrafted
- Playing career: 2025–present

Career history
- 2025–2026: Long Island Nets
- 2026: Vancouver Bandits
- 2026–present: Maine Celtics

Career highlights
- NIT champion (2024)
- Stats at NBA.com
- Stats at Basketball Reference

D'Andre "Dre" Davis (born August 25, 2001) is an American professional basketball player for the Maine Celtics of the NBA G League. He played college basketball for the Louisville Cardinals, Seton Hall Pirates, and Ole Miss Rebels.

== High school career ==
In the 2019–20 season, Davis showed his skills as a senior at Lawrence Central High School, averaging 21.5 points, 8.7 rebounds per game. His team finished with a 22–3 record. Over his high school career, he scored 1,192 points and grabbed 516 rebounds.

Davis played a key role in securing the program's first sectional title in seven years in 2019. His outstanding performance earned him a spot on the 2020 IBCA/Subway Supreme 15 Senior Indiana All-State team, and he was one of the top five finalists for the Indiana Mr. Basketball award, recognizing the state's top high school player. A four-star recruit, Davis committed to playing college basketball for Louisville Cardinals over offers from Nebraska, Purdue, Xavier and Ball State.

== College career ==
=== University of Louisville ===
In his freshman year, Davis started in 17 games, contributing an average of 7.4 points and 3.2 rebounds per game. His standout performance of 21 points against Western Kentucky earned him the ACC Freshman of the Week accolade for the week of November 30 to December 6. Additionally, his defensive efforts during the Bahamas Championship secured his place on the All-Tournament team. As a sophomore starting forward in 23 games, he averaged 7.4 points and 3 rebounds per game. He entered the transfer portal following the 2022 season.

=== Seton Hall University ===
Dre committed in late April to Seton Hall University. Despite missing six games due to an ankle injury, Davis posted double-figure scoring in 11 out of 23 games. He had a good junior year as he averaged 9.6 points per game with a 52 percent field goal and 41 percent three-point shooting, despite his limited playing time. He was promoted to a full time starter during his senior year. He had his best season with a career high shooting 14.9 points per game and 5.8 rebounds a game.

== Professional career ==
=== Long Island Nets (2025–2026) ===
After going Undrafted in the 2025 NBA draft, Davis joined the Brooklyn Nets for the 2025 NBA Summer League. He later signed a training camp deal with the Nets on September 18, 2025, but was waived the next day. He then signed with the Long Island Nets of the NBA G League on October 24, 2025.

== Personal life ==
Dre's brother, Tae Davis committed to Seton Hall the same time Dre transferred. After the 2022 season, Tae transferred to Notre Dame.
