= Tyler Blackburn =

American actor and singer (born 1986)

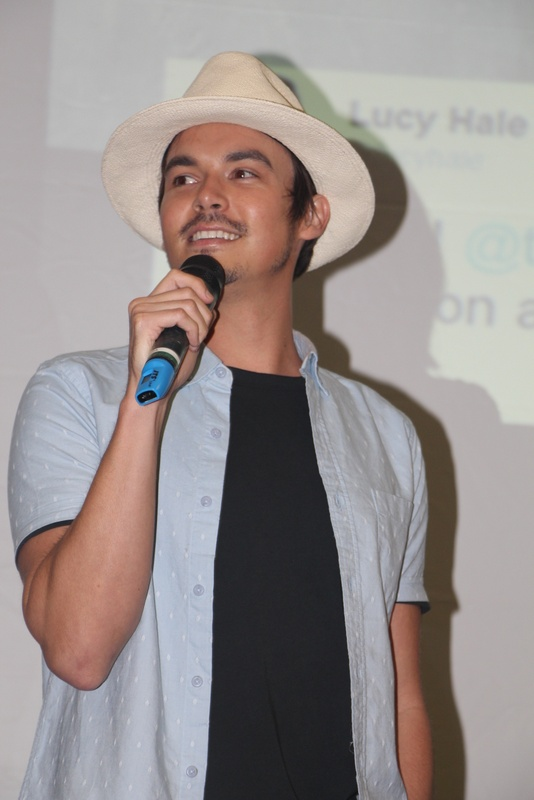
- Blackburn in 2016
- Born: Tyler Jordon Blackburn; October 12, 1986 (age 39); Burbank, California, U.S.
- Occupations: Actor; singer
- Years active: 2002–present

Tyler Jordon Blackburn (born October 12, 1986) is an American actor and singer. He is best known for playing Caleb Rivers on the hit Freeform series Pretty Little Liars and its spin-off, Ravenswood. He most recently starred as Alex Manes in The CW series Roswell, New Mexico (2019–2022).

== Early life ==
Blackburn was born in Burbank, California. He has one older sister and three younger brothers.

Blackburn has a 4 inch long scar on his left shoulder. This was caused due to the removal of a benign bone tumor at the age of 10.

== Career ==
=== Acting ===
Blackburn began performing in 2004 and appeared on the series Unfabulous on Nickelodeon. In the following year he was a teacher in the short film The Doers of Coming Deeds. In 2008, he made a cameo in the film Next of Kin. In 2009, Blackburn appeared in Cold Case and Rockville CA, a webseries launched by Josh Schwartz. In 2010, he appeared on Days of Our Lives, Gigantic, and was also in the independent film Peach Plum Pear.

In October 2010, Blackburn was cast in a recurring role as Caleb Rivers in the television series Pretty Little Liars. He was upgraded to series regular for the third season starting in the summer of 2012.

Blackburn also starred as Pete in the six-episode web series Wendy, a project developed by Alloy Entertainment and Macy's that was based on Peter Pan which premiered on September 15, 2011. In 2012, he starred in drama Hiding alongside Ana Villafañe, Jeremy Sumpter, Dean Armstrong and Dan Payne.

In May 2013, it was announced that Blackburn would star in the 2013 Pretty Little Liars' spin-off Ravenswood.

In March 2018, Blackburn joined the cast of The CW series Roswell, New Mexico as Alex Manes, a character initially introduced as a love interest to Michael Vlamis's Michael Guerin. Blackburn remained a series regular on the show during its four-season run until it ended in 2022.

=== Music ===
For his role in Alloy Entertainment web series Wendy, Blackburn recorded Golden State's "Save Me" to be used as the show's theme song, which was released on August 15, 2011. He recorded "Find a Way" in 2012 for the then ABC Family (now renamed Freeform) show, The Secret Life of the American Teenager. The song was also featured on ABC Family's other shows, including The Fosters and Pretty Little Liars, the latter of which Blackburn starred on.

Subsequently, Blackburn released an extended play titled "Find My Way - EP" in 2013 which was released on Apple Music.

Blackburn has also recorded several songs with Novi, including a feature on Novi's song titled "Can't Love Me". The song was then featured in the twelfth episode of Roswell, New Mexico. on which Blackburn starred on during its four-season run. Blackburn also performed a song called "Would You Come Home" on the thirteenth episode of season two of Roswell, New Mexico as his character, Alex Manes.

== Personal life ==
Through an interview with The Advocate on April 19, 2019, Blackburn publicly came out as queer and bisexual, saying he had identified as bisexual since he was a teenager, but that biphobia had contributed to him suppressing his feelings towards men until his late 20s.

== Filmography ==
=== Film ===
Year	Title	Role	Notes
2006	The Doers of Coming Deeds	Solly Katz	Short film
2008	Next of Kin	French Student	
2010	The Tudor Tutor	Toby	Short film
2011	Peach Plum Pear	Jesse Pratt	
2012	Hiding	Jesse	Direct-to-video
2013	You & Me	Young William	Short film
2016	Love Is All You Need?	Ryan Morris	
2017	Hello Again	Jack (The Young Thing)	

=== Television ===
Year	Title	Role	Notes
2006	Unfabulous	Nathan	2 episodes
2009	Cold Case	Jeff Feldman / Foster	Episode: "Witness Protection"
2010	Days of Our Lives	Ian	17 episodes
2010	Gigantic	Echo	Episode: "Bye Bye Baby"
2011–2017	Pretty Little Liars	Caleb Rivers	Recurring role (seasons 1–2), main role (seasons 3–7); 124 episodes
2013–2014	Ravenswood	Caleb Rivers / Original Caleb	Main role
2019–2022	Roswell, New Mexico	Alex Manes	Main role
2019	Charmed	Viralis	Episode: "Surrender"
2019	Capsized: Blood in the Water	Brad Cavanagh	Television film

=== Web ===
Year	Title	Role	Notes
2009	Rockville CA	Spencer	Episode: "Shoegazed"
2011	Wendy	Pete	Main role; 9 episodes

== Discography ==
=== Extended play ===
Title	EP details
Find a Way	Released: November 5, 2013; Formats: Digital download; Label: International Family Entertainment

=== Singles ===
==== As main artist ====
Title	Year	Album
"Find a Way"	2012	Find a Way
"Would You Come Home"	2020	Roswell New Mexico

==== As featured artist ====
Title	Year	Album
"Long Day" (Novi featuring Tyler Blackburn)	2017	Non-album single
"Can't Love Me" (Novi featuring Tyler Blackburn)	2019	Non-album single

==== Promotional singles ====
Title	Year	Album
"Hard to Forget" (with Anabel Englund)	2012	Find a Way and Anabel Englund

=== Music videos ===
Title	Year	Other artist(s)	Director(s)	Ref.
As main artist
"Save Me"	2011	—N/a	Unknown	
"Hard to Forget"	2012	Anabel Englund	Hannah Lux Davis	
As featured artist
"Long Day"	2017	Novi	Quinn Starr	

== Awards and nominations ==
Year	Award	Category	Nominated work	Result	Refs
2014	Teen Choice Awards	Choice Summer TV Star: Male	Pretty Little Liars	Won	
2015	Teen Choice Awards	Choice Summer TV Star: Male	Pretty Little Liars	Won	
2016	Teen Choice Awards	Choice TV Actor: Drama	Pretty Little Liars	Nominated	
2016	Teen Choice Awards	Choice TV: Chemistry (shared with: Ashley Benson)	Pretty Little Liars	Won	
