= Red Coat (Pretty Little Liars) =

- Pretty Little Liars character
- Red Coat overlooking the grave robbing in "Dead to Me".
- First appearance: "Unmasked"
- Last appearance: "The Gloves Are On"
- Created by: I. Marlene King
- Portrayed by: Sasha Pieterse; Vanessa Ray; Dre Davis; CC Mason (double)

In-universe information
- Alias: Vivian Darkbloom
- Nickname: A (Charlotte/Sara); The Black Widow (Sara)
- Gender: Female
- Occupation: A (Charlotte/Sara); Hiding from A (Alison); Helping the Liars (Alison); Stalking (Charlotte/Sara); Blackmail (Charlotte)
- Seasons: 2–4 • 6
- Status: Alive (Alison); Deceased (Charlotte, Sara)
- Residence: Rosewood, Pennsylvania
- Real name: Alison DiLaurentis; Charlotte Drake; Sara Harvey

Red Coat is a fictional character on the television show Pretty Little Liars, which was adapted from the book series of same name. Introduced during the second-season finale, she became the primary antagonist of the third and fourth seasons. In Season 4, it is revealed there are 2 active Red Coat's, one being CeCe Drake, the other being Alison DiLaurentis. In Season 6, it is revealed there is a third red coat, this one being Sara Harvey.

== Background ==
In the second-season finale "Unmasked", the first "A" is revealed to be Mona Vanderwaal, who wanted revenge on the Liars for not preventing Alison's bullying and slowly distancing Hanna away from her. During a fight with Spencer, Mona ends up falling off a cliff and is then found by the authorities and admitted to the Radley Sanitarium, a local psychiatric hospital. During the final scene of the episode, a nurse comes in to alert Mona that she has a visitor and someone walks inside her room in what it looks like a red trench coat, appearing to be the same one worn by Alison DiLaurentis in her Vivian Darkbloom disguise. Mona proceeds to tell the unseen visitor that she did everything they asked her to.

In the third season, we see Red Coat (CeCe) purchasing hoodies for the team she is building, and later the Liars begin catching glimpses of her. Hanna sees the mysterious figure watching her outside a boutique (Alison), Emily remembers her in a flashback to the night she and Mona kidnapped her (CeCe), Spencer notices her on a date with Wren (Sara) and Aria catches her at a morgue (CeCe). All four girls see two specific details in regards to her physical features: a red trench coat with blonde curly hair hanging out. Emily suspects that Red Coat is the one in charge of the "A-Team" and they hatch a plan to catch her. Spencer having joined the "A-Team" at the time to look for clues on Toby, who was briefly on the team before inexplicably disappearing, finds out that he is alive and a double agent who intends to help the girls. Spencer gives Mona and Red Coat the idea to throw a party at the Thornhill Lodge, where Red Coat can meet the girls in person. Mona and Red Coat agree with the idea. Red Coat (Sara) flies in on a plane and Toby and Spencer go outside to catch her. As the other Liars corner Mona inside, someone sets fire to the lodge. Toby goes to follow a flashlight in the woods and Spencer follows Red Coat, who gets off the plane and heads into the woods. Aria, Emily, Hanna and Mona fall unconscious due to the flames and smoke, but Hanna is pulled out by Red Coat and she looks up to see Alison DiLaurentis. As the girls all gather outside, Mona says she also saw Alison and Spencer believes she did too. However, Mona proceeds to admit that she doesn't know the accurate identity of Red Coat because the anonymous entity always wore a mask.

In the fourth season, Red Coat continues to play the game. The disguise is briefly abandoned, after the Red Coat who flew into the Lodge burned her coat and mask in the Lodge fire, but Red Coat returns mid-season and films a video of herself in an Emily mask (CeCe). She then begins sneaking under the DiLaurentis home and surveilling the residence. (Sara). Toby and Caleb begin looking for clues on her identity and discover that CeCe Drake is the one who set up the flight plan for Red Coat to go to the Lodge. The Liars hunt for CeCe but with no luck. In "Bring Down the Hoe," she returns and is seen in a room filled with photos of Alison and a red coat laying on a chair. Red Coat (CeCe) shows up to the Rosewood High Hoedown and Spencer and Emily manage to take her coat. They discover that the coat is missing the same button which they found earlier underneath the DiLaurentis house. Meanwhile, CeCe lurks outside Ezra's apparent in the same attire that Red Coat wears but now in a black hoodie.

== Unmasking ==
In the fourth season's mid-season finale "Now You See Me, Now You Don't", the Liars head to Ravenswood to look for Red Coat. While there, Red Coat kidnaps Emily and locks her in a coffin on a Sawmill. The Liars witness Red Coat heading to that Sawmill and chase her inside, where she actually stops the saw and another Red Coat, donning a mask of Alison's face, appears on the stairwell, revealing that two people have been sporting the disguise all along. Spencer follows the Red Coat who saved Emily, while Aria fights the masked Red Coat and unmasks her as CeCe Drake. The Liars manage to catch the Red Coat who saved Emily in the ending of "Grave New World", who reveals herself as an alive Alison. During "Escape from New York", Aria claims that she asked CeCe to wear the disguise to distract "A" and that CeCe was never truly Red Coat. It is later revealed that CeCe actually was the Red Coat who stole the game from Mona and wore the disguise during her schemes, presumably until the saw mill incident. In "Game Over, Charles", the Liars learn there was a third Red Coat who posed as a decoy for CeCe and used the infamous disguise to distract the Liars whenever CeCe couldn't. The third Red Coat is revealed to be Sara Harvey.

=== Exegesis: summary of episode "Game Over, Charles" ===
Big "A" kidnaps Alison from the Rosewood High senior prom and takes her to Radley, where their dad and brother are also there, unconscious. With Mona's aid, the Liars figure out that "A's" phone server is located at the Carissimi Group's building and along with Sara make their way over there. They manage to break into a secret room hidden in the wall of an empty storage room. The Liars and Mona go inside but Sara suspiciously leaves them behind, just as the door closes.

A holographic monitor comes on and the Liars get a glimpse of a live feed that shows Alison in a room, talking to "A". "A" turns around and is revealed to be CeCe Drake, who reveals that she was born as Charles before transitioning into Charlotte. CeCe/Charlotte reveals that she became "A" (and thus Red Coat) in order to sneak out of Radley and because she was angry that she thought the Liars were happy about her disappearance.

While Charlotte is telling her story, the Liars are alerted to a motion sensor in another room. Mona turns the camera to the room and they see that the motion sensor was alerted by Red Coat, who is setting up a bomb for Charlotte to blow up Radley with her family alongside herself. The Liars are stunned by this revelation, having previously assumed that CeCe and Alison were the only two Red Coats.

Charlotte mentions that she kept seeing a blonde girl in a black coat watching the girls and deduced the mysterious entity was Alison. So in order to find out, Charlotte organized the lodge party at Thornhill to trap the girls and lure Alison out of hiding, since she knew her sister would only show up if her friends were in grave danger. Charlotte sent the other Red Coat to the Lodge to distract the Liars and keep Mona occupied. She reveals that the other Red Coat is Sara Harvey, explaining that she was a decoy whenever she "needed her to be". Nigel Wright was paid to fake a flight plan to Delaware by Charlotte but the plane actually made its way to the lodge since Sara landed it in a nearby field despite the fog in the area. Shana Fring also showed up with Jenna Marshall to find out if the Liars were going to meet Alison at the request of Melissa Hastings, since she too had her own suspicions. However, both plans went away and while Jenna wasn't noticing, Shana set fire to the lodge since she grew a hatred towards the Liars for blinding Jenna as she later admits to in "Escape from New York". Sara managed to rescue Aria, Emily and Mona while Alison arrived just in time to save Hanna, giving Charlotte the much needed confirmation that her sister was indeed alive. Knowing that Wilden would never let Alison return and tell her story, Charlotte went to the lake and killed him, dumping his car and body in the middle of town. She then sent Sara dressed as the mysterious woman in a black veil to attend his funeral and ensure he was deceased. The Liars are shocked about this revelation, but Hanna tells Emily that Charlotte is just messing with her. However, Spencer realizes that the authorities haven't arrived to Radley because Sara must've pretended to dial them.

The Liars manage to break out of the room and head over to Radley, where they come upon Sara in the hallway. She orders them to leave as she turns on the bomb for Charlotte, but they manage to subdue her and give Spencer enough time to stop the bomb. Alison quickly arrives and tells them that Charlotte has headed to the roof and begs them to help her surrender. Sara tries to escape but Emily grabs her by the hood of her trench coat and angrily punches her in the face for betraying her trust. They chase Charlotte and persuade her not to commit suicide. She instead declares an end to the "A" game. At the end of the episode, Emily mentions that Sara is getting released from the local town's hospital and Alison states that what happened to her that night wasn't their fault. Nonetheless, Spencer discloses to Caleb during "The Gloves Are On" that after Emily punched Sara, she got back up but accidentally put her hand on some electrical cords, which began electrocuting her body, as the Liars watched in horror. This led to Sara being unable to use her hands since she lost her palpable abilities.

== Reception ==
The reveal of Alison possibly being alive and Red Coat in "A Dangerous Game" was met with mixed reviews, with many expressing joy over this, while others were disappointed in not receiving a definite answer to Red Coat's identity. The reveal that there were two active Red Coats was generally met with positive reviews, with many praising the reveal that Alison was alive in the episode "Grave New World" as one of the best moments of the series.

The reveal of the third Red Coat received mostly negative reviews, with many feeling discomfort over Sara being officially introduced so late into the series. However, Entertainment Weekly's Isabella Biedenharn deemed the best moment of "Game Over, Charles" the scene where Emily punches Sara in the face for her betrayal. Many fans speculated Charlotte herself to be Red Coat before the infamous reveal, as well as suspects of "Jenna Marshall", "Melissa Hastings", or "Maya St. Germain", especially after fans seen Emily's reaction in the promos.

== See also ==
- Alison DiLaurentis
- Charlotte DiLaurentis
- Sara Harvey (character)
