= Unmasked (Pretty Little Liars) =

- Pretty Little Liars episode
- Episode no.: Season 2 Episode 25
- Directed by: Lesli Linka Glatter
- Written by: I. Marlene King
- Cinematography by: Larry Reibman
- Editing by: Lois Blumenthal
- Original air date: March 19, 2012
- Running time: 42 minutes

Guest appearances
- Tammin Sursok as Jenna Marshall; Janel Parrish as Mona Vanderwaal; Keegan Allen as Toby Cavanaugh; Annabeth Gish as Dr. Anne Sullivan; Nia Peeples as Pam Fields; Brendan Robinson as Lucas Gottesman; Lindsey Shaw as Paige McCullers; Tyler Blackburn as Caleb Rivers; Torrey DeVitto as Melissa Hastings; Travis Richey as Harold Crane

Episode chronology
← Previous "If These Dolls Could Talk"	Next → "It Happened 'That Night'"
- Pretty Little Liars (season 2)

"Unmasked" is the season finale and the twenty-fifth episode of the second season of Pretty Little Liars, which premiered on ABC Family on March 19, 2012. The forty-seventh episode overall, it was directed by Lesli Linka Glatter and written by series creator and showrunner I. Marlene King. The episode yielded 3.69 million viewers and a 1.6 demo rating, an increase from the previous episode. It received widespread acclaim from critics, with many noting the satisfying reveal and climactic final scenes, and is often noted as one of the best episodes of the series. In particular, the performances of Janel Parrish and Shay Mitchell received critical praise.

Set chronologically in April 2011, the episode revolves around the Liars approaching to the truth of who's behind "A"'s mask, while the identity of the stalker shocks the girls and a dead body is found.

== Plot ==
Local news report that Officer Garrett Reynolds was arrested for Alison DiLaurentis' murder. Rosewood P.D.'s theory is that Reynolds joined the police to destroy evidence which linked him to the crime scene. Spencer, Hanna, Aria and Emily watch the program as the narrator reveals that the page five of Alison's autopsy was founded; Spencer then tells the girls that Jenna is the one who delivered the paper to the P.D. Hanna notes that two members of the N.A.T. Club are still out there: Melissa and Jenna. Melissa then suddenly appears and says she knew all along that Ian hadn't killed Alison. She states that she know who Jenna got blind, just like Garrett do, and that this could be why he murdered Alison. Melissa leaves with Aria's ice cream, as they receive a message from "A" and invitations for the Masquerade Ball.

The girls discuss outside the school about how smart and untrustworthy Melissa is. Mona approaches, wanting to go with them to a little shop to buy costumes, but they dodge her. At Ezra's apartment, they rummage Alison's bag and discover about the Lost Woods Resort, the connection between the clues they found lately. That evening, they drive to Lost Woods, where they meet the innkeeper and rent the Room 1. Spencer sings their entry as Mary Smith. Emily gets a call from Maya and leaves the room in order to catch a better signal. Spencer and Aria sneak into the reception to read the guestbook; they discover that Alison has checked in twice as Vivian Darkbloom. "A" enters the room and Hanna almost sees him/her. The next morning, Spencer and Aria returns the guestbook, and they decide to leave, as "A" watches them through a peep hole. Back in town, Spencer apologizes with Toby, but he refuses to talk about Jenna. As Spencer leaves, he receives a call from Dr. Sullivan. Meanwhile, Jenna meets with an unknown person, where it is revealed that she can see.

At the masquerade, they split to investigate "A" separately. Mona reveals to Spencer that before Ali's disappearance she saw Ali dressed strangely and spying on someone at a vintage shop in Brookhaven. In the flashback, Ali hands Mona a postcard with a phone number on it in exchange of keeping Ali's secret. Jenna texts Aria, and the latter enters a maze and Jenna follows her. However, Aria finds Ezra in the end of the maze. Ezra and Aria have their first dance in public. Caleb and Hanna also dance together, while Paige and Emily talk about their relationship and decide to be friends. Meanwhile, Mona and Spencer drive to the Lost Woods Resort in order to discover what's in Room 2. Arriving there, Spencer discovers "A's" lair, where costumes, hoodies, pictures, and other parachute reside. Spencer finds Ali's diary and solves the puzzle: Mona is "A". But before she can do something, Mona knocks her out with a flashlight. Hanna, Emily and Aria get curious about the Black Swan and follow her, but they only get a feather of the costume.

Spencer wakes up in the car with Mona driving. The girls try to call Spencer, and when she secretly answers it, it is revealed to the girls that Mona is "A". Hanna is shocked, and Spencer cleverly leaves a clue of where they are for the girls, who run off to find her. Mona says she admires Spencer and invites her to join the A-Team. Mona reveals that she became "A" because she hated them for stealing Hanna's friendship from her. Spencer asks Mona to stop, encouraging her that Hanna is still her friend. Spencer pulls the car's emergency brake and manages to leave the vehicle. Mona gets out of the car and is almost run over by Hanna. Mona pulls Spencer up and tries to push her off the cliff; they fight and Mona falls instead. The girls approach Spencer and help her. Shortly after, the authorities appear and it is revealed that Mona is still alive. Dr. Sullivan says Mona blackmailed her by threatening her son, which is why she disappeared. Dr. Sullivan diagnoses Mona with a personality disorder which caused her to experience a sense of hyper-reality and omnipresence. Mona is sent to a mental institution and Dr. Sullivan states Mona can be helped with treatment. The doctor then reveals to Spencer that Toby convinced her to come back to Rosewood; outside, Spencer and Toby kiss. Afterwards, the girls drive to Emily's house, and they discover that Maya's body was found, and Emily gets distraught.

Meanwhile, Mona is visited by someone in a red coat at Radley Sanitarium and tells the figure that she did everything they asked her to do.

== Reception ==
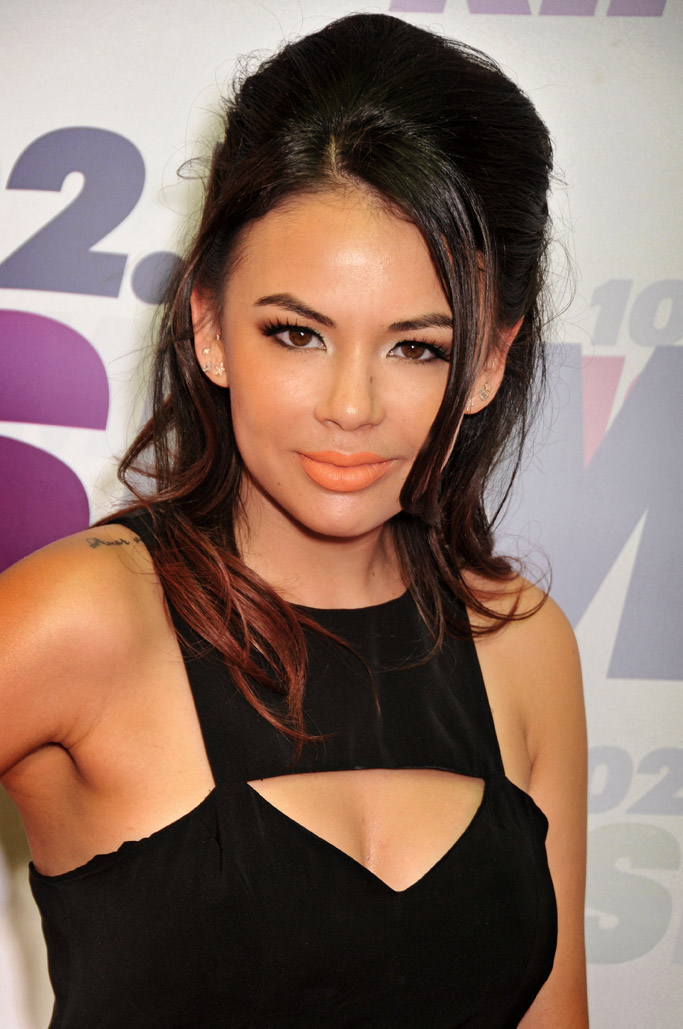
Critics praised Janel Parrish's character Mona Vanderwaal, who is revealed to be "A".

Teresa Lopez of TVFanatic gave the episode 3.5 out of 5 stars, stating, "What really bothered me about the finale was that despite getting an identity for A, even that revelation wasn't 100% certain. As one of my friends very rightly pointed out, the problem with the show is that it can be so manipulative without being fully satisfying." Louis Peitzman of TV.com gave the episode a favorable review, calling it "Pretty Little Liars at its finest," and writing, "The build-up to the reveal of Mona as 'A' was appropriately suspenseful. Like the Halloween episode, the finale delivered on the creepy factor: that motel, the Norman Bates wannabe, the lair where 'A' did all her dirty work. The Psycho references were heavy-handed, to say the least, but they were also pretty fun. For those of us who appreciate soapy teen thrillers and Alfred Hitchcock, it was nice to see a little overlap."

"Unmasked" was watched by 3.69 million Americans and scored a 1.6 Nielsen rating/share in the adults among 18–49 demographic. It was up both viewers and adults 18–49, respectively, from the previous episode, "If These Dolls Could Talk", which netted 2.47 million American viewers and a 1.0 Nielsen rating/share.
