= Pilot (Pretty Little Liars) =

- Pretty Little Liars episode
- Episode no.: Season 1 Episode 1
- Directed by: Lesli Linka Glatter
- Written by: I. Marlene King
- Cinematography by: Dana Gonzales
- Editing by: Jacqueline Cambas
- Original air date: June 8, 2010

Guest appearances
- Julian Morris as Wren Kingston; Janel Parrish as Mona Vanderwaal; Torrey DeVitto as Melissa Hastings; Sasha Pieterse as Alison DiLaurentis; Tammin Sursok as Jenna Marshall; Amanda Schull as Meredith Sorenson; Bryce Johnson as Darren Wilden; Carlo Marks as Ian Thomas; Anne Marie DeLuise as Jessica DiLaurentis; Cody Christian as Mike Montgomery; James Neate as Toby Cavanaugh

Episode chronology
← Previous —	Next → "The Jenna Thing"
- Pretty Little Liars (season 1)

"Pilot" is the series premiere of the American mystery teen drama television series Pretty Little Liars. It introduces each of the main characters, as well as establishes the basic premises of the series. The episode aired on June 8, 2010, on ABC Family.

In the episode, the main characters Aria Montgomery, Spencer Hastings, Hanna Marin and Emily Fields find themselves apprehensive one year after the disappearance of Alison DiLaurentis. When Aria returns to Rosewood, she reconnects with her old friends and secrets of the past begin to haunt them. Alison's body is then found in her former home, and after the funeral, the girls receive a frightening anonymous message signed by "A".

The episode received mixed reviews and was watched by 2.47 million viewers.

== Pilot ==
In Rosewood, Pennsylvania on September 1, 2009, four friends get together in a homely barn, drinking and having fun. At one point, a noise outside the barn scares them. The four girls slowly make their way to the barn door, and a blonde girl gives them a fright, screaming. The blonde is after revealed to be Alison DiLaurentis, the clique's leader. The five then either sit or lie down and return to playful activities, falling asleep shortly after. During nightfall, Alison disappears and Spencer Hastings tries to look for her in the night. Aria Montgomery then wakes up and finds Spencer arriving back to the barn, where Spencer tells her and the others that she did not find Alison anywhere, and that she thinks she heard a scream.

One year later, it is revealed that Alison mysteriously vanished that night, and the girls went separate ways. Aria and her parents traveled for a year to Iceland; Hanna Marin underwent a complete style transformation, becoming the it-girl of Rosewood's social scene, and is friends with Mona Vanderwaal, who used to be bullied by Alison; Emily Fields focused on her swimming skills, hiding that she is attracted to girls and was in love with Alison; and Spencer focused on her studies and struggled to become Rosewood High's number one student.

The Montgomerys return to Rosewood after spending a year in Iceland, and Aria finds herself unable to adapt again to the town's mediocrity. Ella and Byron, Aria's parents, are happy together again after a crisis they had in the past, while Mike, Aria's younger brother, quickly settles himself in the lacrosse team. In an attempt to refresh her mind, she goes to a pub to drink and meets a young man there who also likes literature. They feel connected and make out in the pub's bathroom. On the first day of class, she discovers he is her new English teacher, Ezra Fitz. Aria receives a threatening message from someone who identifies as 'A', and who apparently knows about hers and her father's secrets.

At the Rosewood Mall, Hanna and Mona shoplift and camera footage catch Hanna, leading her mother to sleep with Detective Darren Wilden to release her daughter. Spencer prepares for a family dinner in which her sister Melissa introduces her fiancé Wren to the Hastings. Spencer discovers that Melissa and Wren will live in the barn that Spencer has gone on vacancy reforming and it irritates her. Meanwhile, Spencer discovers that she feels something for Wren. Emily's mother asks her to drop a welcome basket to the family which just moved to Rosewood and is living in the old DiLaurentis residence. Emily is reluctant, but ends up meeting with Maya who is the daughter of the St. Germains. They quickly befriend. Ashley, Hanna's mother, is still suffering from her divorce, and is having an affair with the detective who released Hanna. It is also revealed that Aria's father had an affair with one of his students in the past, Meredith, just like what is happening between Aria and Ezra. Spencer receives a message from 'A' which makes her remember she kissed Ian Thomas, Melissa's former boyfriend, in the past. Emily and Hanna also receive threatening message from 'A'.

They soon suspect Alison is 'A', until her body is found in the St. Germain residence and the town is shocked. At her funeral, Jessica DiLaurentis meets the girls and places her in the front row. The girls worry when Jenna Marshall—a classmate who was blinded in an incident involving the four girls and Alison—and her stepbrother Toby appear in the funeral. Afterwards, outside the church, the girls receive one more text: I'm still here bitches. And I know everything -A..

== Production ==
"Pilot" was written by the series' showrunner and main collaborator, I. Marlene King, and directed by Lesli Linka Glatter. On January 27, 2010, ABC Family picked up the series for 10 episodes, set to premiere in June 2010. The opening theme song for Pretty Little Liars is "Secret" by The Pierces, which was suggested by one of the show's stars, Ashley Benson.

=== Casting ===
ABC Family began casting for a Pretty Little Liars television pilot in October 2009. Lucy Hale was cast as Aria Montgomery in the project, followed by Troian Bellisario as Spencer Hastings and Ian Harding as Ezra Fitz in November 2009. In December 2009, The Futon Critic confirmed the casting of Ashley Benson as Hanna Marin and Shay Mitchell as Emily Fields, as well as the addition of Laura Leighton as Ashley Marin, Nia Peeples as Pam Fields, Roark Critchlow as Tom Marin, and Bianca Lawson as Maya. Mitchell had initially auditioned for the role of Spencer and then tried for Emily. The Hollywood Reporter also noted that Torrey DeVitto and Sasha Pieterse landed recurring roles in the pilot. The Alloy Entertainment website later confirmed that Pieterse would be playing Alison DiLaurentis and DeVitto would be Melissa Hastings, also mentioning the casting of Janel Parrish as Mona Vanderwaal. Initially, Alexis Denisof was cast to be Aria Montgomery's father Byron. In April 2010, the role of Aria's father Byron was recast with Chad Lowe, and Holly Marie Combs was cast as Aria's mother Ella. Jenna Marshall is played by Tammin Sursok. The actors who played Ian Thomas, Toby Cavanaugh and Jessica DiLaurentis in this episode were after replaced by Ryan Merriman, Keegan Allen and Andrea Parker, respectively.

=== Filming ===
After the pilot was shot in Vancouver, filming for the rest of the series moved to Los Angeles. The series was primarily filmed at the Warner Bros. studio and backlot in the city of Burbank (near Los Angeles).

== Reception ==
=== Ratings ===
The pilot was broadcast on June 8, 2010. It was watched by 2.47 million viewers, scoring a 0.9 rating in the 18-49 demographic.

=== Reviews ===
"Pilot" was received with mixed opinions, although the series has gotten a more positive critique over its progression. Metacritic gave the pilot episode 52 out of 100, based upon 14 critical reviews. The New York Daily News gave the show a positive review, commenting that it "makes most popular vampire romances look anemic", while concluding, "Pretty Little Liars could go in several directions, including mundane teen clichés. It's got an equally good shot at making us care about these imperfect pretty girls." A writer on Terror Hook has stated that " 'Pretty Little Liars' gets off to a very promising start. Great production all around, the writing keeps the viewer on their toes, and the acting just reinforces it. The overall mystery of the show in the end is dark and unpredictable, even stepping into the slasher film realm." The New York Post gave the show three out of five stars, stating, "OK, so we've established that there is no socially redeeming value in this series and that your kids shouldn't watch it if they are too young and impressionable. But if you can distract them enough to miss the first 15 minutes, the show isn't half-bad. Actually, it is half-good, if that makes sense." The Los Angeles Times wrote that the series is "one of those shows that manages to mildly, and perhaps unintentionally, spoof its genre while fully participating in it, and that's not a bad thing at all."
