= Jenna Marshall =

Fictional character

- Pretty Little Liars character
- Jenna secretly meeting up with Shana Fring during "Unmasked".
- Portrayed by: Tammin Sursok
- First appearance: "Pilot" (2010)
- Last appearance: "Till Death Do Us Part" (2017)
- Created by: Sara Shepard (books); I. Marlene King (adapted)
In-universe information
- Other names: Jenna Cavanaugh
- Occupation: "A" Team; Working for Uber A Life skills teacher
- Stepfather: Daniel Cavanaugh
- Brothers: Toby Cavanaugh (step)

Jenna Marshall is a fictional character / antagonist created by I. Marlene King for the Freeform television series Pretty Little Liars and portrayed by Tammin Sursok. The character is based on Jenna Cavanaugh, who was created by Sara Shepard in the book series. Although in the novels Jenna is murdered in Heartless, in the show she is still alive. Jenna is a major recurring character in the first five seasons, acting as a member of the A-Team, while being absent for the sixth, and returning in the seventh, working as a helper to Uber A.

== Development ==
=== Characterization ===
Toby had described Jenna as "someone who gets whatever she wants". Although Jenna is resentful towards Alison and her friends, she volunteers to do a speech at Alison's memorial dedication in "Please, Do Talk About Me When I'm Gone". She shares only kind words, mentioning Alison's visit to her in the hospital, claiming that Ali made her stronger and more in touch with her identity.

Jenna also proves she can be slightly abusive and controlling, as she slaps Toby when he tells her he will "never touch her like that again", and asks who he thinks he's talking to. Jenna is known to show a much sadder and vulnerable side than she usually does when around people she doesn't know. She has made a beautiful pottery piece, but is frustrated that she cannot see anything, not even the shadows it produces when lit.

=== Rivalries and friendships ===
Jenna is known for her rivalries with Alison DiLaurentis, Spencer Hastings, Toby Cavanaugh, Hanna Marin, Aria Montgomery, and Emily Fields. Alison originally offered Jenna a chance to become a member of her clique, but rejected her request, leading Alison and the Liars to blind her, an event later nicknamed "The Jenna Thing". Marshall had romantic feelings for her step-brother Toby Cavanaugh in which she forced herself on him. However, he didn't return those feelings which angered her. When Jenna finds out that Toby has developed romantic feelings for Emily, she reacts very spitefully. When he is arrested during the first season, Marshall discloses to him that she turned him in to the police so he'd come home in hopes of continuing their sexual relationship. In "Wanted: Dead or Alive" it is divulged that Jenna and Charlotte DiLaurentis were great friends for a long time. Apparently, Mona told Charlotte everything about the Liars shortly after being admitted to Radley Sanitarium. For Charlotte, Jenna was a "celebrity" because of everything she went through. Jenna was also previously a member of Charlotte's A-Team. Marshall knew Charlotte and Archer Dunhill were together, and helped him develop the Elliott Rollins alias and get a job as a psychiatrist. Jenna also attempted to track down the whereabouts of Charlotte's birth mother, Mary Drake. Marshall is currently working for the newest incarnation of "A", commonly known as "A.D.", though she's doing so anonymously.

=== Relationships ===
Jenna was romantically linked to Garrett Reynolds. The two began a relationship in "For Whom The Bell Tools", as it is shown when Reynolds shows up in Jenna's room and kisses her. However, it was revealed the two were linked to the N.A.T Club, as they appeared together on the night of Alison DiLaurentis's disappearance. Jenna later dumps Garrett when he is arrested for the murder of Alison DiLaurentis.

Marshall was also romantically linked to Noel Kahn. The two were seen together on a romantic evening by Noel's ex-girlfriend Mona Vanderwaal and Hanna Marin. They dated for a while and seem to have broken up some point later in the third season. However, they maintained a friendship since during the seventh season, both return to Rosewood in attempt to steal Charlotte's money to pay another eye surgery for Jenna. Marshall claims to the authorities she pretended to act as Kahn's partner because he murdered Sara Harvey and she feared to be his subsequent victim.

As revealed in "A Dangerous Game", Jenna and Shana seemed to be in a romantic relationship although it is somewhat ambiguous. Throughout the fourth season they are seen together, although no kissing or explicit declarations of love are shown. Shana is confirmed to have been madly in love with Jenna, and it is made clear in the fifth season when Marshall mourns her death.

== Novels storylines ==
Jenna was popularly connected with the fairytale princess Snow White. She had pale skin, long black hair, naturally pink lips, and big green eyes. She also was quite tall and had a cute figure. Alison often called her 'Snow' but used the nickname in a mean way. Jenna was known to be very quiet and has a sweet, kind personality. Whenever she takes off her glasses, it can be seen that she has small bruises and cuts reaching from her eyes to her nose. It was said it could be from her stepbrother Toby.

Jenna was often the target of Alison and her crew, with jokes about her likeness to Snow White and pranks such as giving her apples dipped in toilet water. There might have been some resentment among the group about her good looks, since Hanna mentioned she was "pretty in an annoying way."

One evening, Ali convinced the others to support her plan to get revenge on Jenna's stepbrother, Toby Cavanaugh, for spying on them while they were changing. Ali snuck into the Cavanaugh's yard, grabbed one of Toby's fireworks, and accidentally launched it into his garage. Alison sees Toby and Jenna together and accidentally set the firework off into the garage, blinding Jenna and burning it down. Alison blackmails Toby into taking the blame for the incident and he is sent away. Later the girls would come to call the infamous incident "The Jenna Thing."

However, four years later, during a storm and power outage, Jenna reveals to Aria that she not only knew Ali set off the firework, but they planned it together as well, to get rid of Toby. Jenna tells Aria that her parents gave Toby a warning: if he kept setting off fireworks from his tree house, he'd be sent away to boarding school. Their plan worked, but it cost Jenna her sight and she left Rosewood Day to attend a school for the blind in Philadelphia. By the time the second "A" wreaks significant havoc in the girls' lives, it becomes clear to Aria that Jenna knows vital information about the culprit. Unfortunately, before Aria can ask her what she knows, Jenna is murdered by this "A" and found dead in a ditch in her parents' backyard. In Wanted, it is revealed that the real Alison DiLaurentis is the new "A" and her murderer.

== Television storylines ==
In October 2008, Jenna moved to Rosewood after her mother married Toby's father and quickly became popular at Rosewood High School. Alison invited her to join her group of friends but she declined. This led to a long-term rivalry between the two. Jenna is a very aggressive and manipulative person. She forced her step-brother, Toby, into a sexual relationship with her and threatened to accuse him of forcing himself on her. After being blinded by Alison and her friends, Jenna developed a hatred and grudge against all of them. Jenna seems to have been involved with the N.A.T. Club before Alison went missing. She was not sorry for Alison's passing and has continued to keep the Liars on her radar to keep them from revealing her secrets.

=== Season 1 ===
The character is officially introduced in the pilot episode, being guided into Alison DiLaurentis' funeral by her step-brother Toby Cavanaugh, much to everyone's surprise. Marshall is led out to a car by Toby moments after the memorial service concludes.

In "The Jenna Thing", Marshall appears in the beginning of the episode walking into the Apple Rose Grille in a time when the Liars happened to be there. When Jenna sits down, they quietly get up and leave. Marshall later appears at the school cafeteria when Aria Montgomery invites her to sit with her friends. It is an awkward lunch, seeing as Jenna makes the Liars nervous and insinuates that the group's dynamic changed since Alison's absence. Marshall discloses to them that Ali paid a visit to her while she was admitted at the hospital. Jenna affirms that everyone misunderstood Alison but she knew exactly who Ali was. The girls remain silent as a flashback ensues to the fateful events of the night they blinded her. At one point, Marshall breaks the silence by picking up Spencer's beeping phone, when she receives a text. Spencer turns paranoid after getting a text from "A" with Jenna in such close proximity. No one found out about "The Jenna Thing," but with Toby's knowledge of the incident, the Liars suspected the secret was going to slip. Jenna is later seated on a bench during Spencer's run, using a phone for the blind. Marshall orders the item to send a text, then proceeds to turn around and face where Spencer's standing.

During "To Kill a Mocking Girl", Jenna is seen walking down the school's hallway with Toby while the Liars whisper to each other. She makes a remark on their blabbing, saying "Almost feels like Alison's still here." Later when Emily Fields comes to thank Cavanaugh for helping her with Ben, Jenna is present, unbeknownst to Fields. After Em leaves, Jenna questions Toby about the reason why Emily thanked him but he assures his step-sister it isn't what she's thinking.

Throughout "Reality Bites Me", Jenna is seen by Hanna Marin on her way to work at Dr Ackard's office. Jenna enters the elevator and puts on her trademark lipstick. Marshall asks Hanna if she likes the color (believed to be Jungle Red, Alison's favorite). It is undisclosed whether Jenna knew if she was talking to Hanna.

In "There's No Place Like Homecoming", Jenna and her seeing eye dog Shadow visit Emily at her house after homecoming. Emily is resting after having been hospitalized. Marshall comes under the guise of being sympathetic to Emily's plight, even going as far as bringing her cookies. Jenna found out that Toby's psychological profile is missing because the cops went looking for it, and knows the Liars took the file, having overheard them talking about it at Homecoming. She wants Emily to return the document, so she can protect her secret of having forced her step-brother into a sexual relationship. Emily is open to fulfilling Jenna's request, as she feels partially responsible for Jenna's accident, something Jenna does not fail to mention repeatedly. Fields tries to get the file back, but cannot contact the Liars while her mother is around. Aria later throws the file into the river. However, it seems the file makes its way into "A"'s hands anyway, when a figure is seen gingerly retrieving the pages from the water. When Jenna asks for the file after Emily returns to Rosewood High, Fields vaguely tells her that it is gone. Marshall is put off, after being placed in the position where she is forced to trust Emily.

Throughout "Please, Do Talk About Me When I'm Gone", Jenna is still resentful towards Alison but volunteers to make a speech at her memorial dedication. She shares only kind words, mentioning Ali's visit to her in the hospital, further claiming that she made her stronger and more in touch with her identity.

During "The New Normal", Jenna hails a cab after Toby's house arrest bracelet is removed, so the two can share a ride. Marshall is very upset when he declines her offer and chooses to go with Spencer instead.

In "The Badass Seed", Jenna offers to play flute for the school play, "The Bad Seed" and tells Ezra Fitz that she is fascinated with the play and its theme regarding the nature of evil. Marshall is seen talking to Ian Thomas in the by a similar name, taking a "Neuman's" shopping bag from him, though the contents aren't revealed. With Mr. Fitz as her guide, Jenna writes an essay to be submitted to a contest with vague references to the event that blinded her. The essay centers around a blind girl that senses more than people with an intact eyesight do and heavily implies that her blindness wasn't an accident. The content leads Ezra to believe her brother is guilty, not the girls. Ezra is fascinated by the story and believes it has a chance at winning. At the end of the episode, Aria confides to Mr. Fitz about who the real perpetrators were. Jenna makes a comment in regards to Aria's romantic relationship with Fitz, startling Montgomery, because it is unclear how Marshall has knowledge on the couple.

Throughout "Someone to Watch Over Me", Jenna is seen with the owl that Hanna thought was a gift for her from Caleb. However, it is actually a flash drive that Jenna gave Caleb to place information on his girlfriend and later return to her. As the Liars put the pieces together, they realize that Marshall had been paying Caleb to spy on Hanna and look for a key in her house that she thought Ali had given to one of the girls. A hurt Marin slaps Jenna at the girls' bathroom in Rosewood High for what she did and Marshall proceeds to weep over it.

During "For Whom the Bells Toll", footage of Jenna forcing Toby into intercourse is uncovered. The Liars decide to approach Marshall for answers. Knowing they have the videos, Jenna reveals that Alison visited her at the hospital, but threatened Marshall to never tell anyone about her role in the prank or she'd unveil footage of Jenna sexually abusing her step-brother. Her supposed last words to Jenna were, "if you ever come back to Rosewood, I'll bury you". The girls then realize that, when Ali told them to "wait for it," she was referring to the video. Jenna dials Ian and warns him that the Liars hold possession of the video, although he assures her the situation is under control. Officer Garrett Reynolds, who had reassured Emily that he was on the Liars' side, then shows up in Marshall's room, and the two share a kiss, revealing they're in a relationship.

=== Season 2 ===
In the second season, the character first appears in "It's Alive", when she and Garrett are seen spying on Jason DiLaurentis and discussing the ominous-sounding “Jason thing.” Later, Jenna is secretly standing nearby as Garrett preps the girls for interrogation after Spencer's near death experience.

Returning in "My Name Is Trouble", Jenna takes a pottery class at Hollis College, alongside Aria. Aria pretends to be Anita, in order to seclude her identity from Marshall. When she deduced Aria was Anita, she showcased a much vulnerable side than she usually does. Jenna has made a beautiful pottery piece, but is frustrated that she cannot see anything, not even the shadows it produces when lit. Aria tries to comfort her through praising her work, but when Marshall discovers that it was Montgomery, she goes ballistic, screaming at her to get out.

During "Surface Tension", Aria finds Jenna's pottery piece among Mike's belongings. She assumes that her brother stole the item from the Cavanaugh house, but he asserts his sister that he took it from Garrett's apartment. This causes Aria to realize that Reynolds cannot be trusted.

In "Save the Date", the Liars witness Garrett pull up to Toby and Jenna's house in his car. It could go either way, considering Garrett's parents live across the street. However, Reynolds heads for Jenna's place, and the girls follow to watch. Inside, Jenna removes her robe to reveal the black lace lingerie she was seen buying in an earlier episode. She removes her glasses, and the two start kissing passionately. Garrett and Jenna do a lot of spying together in his sports car. There, they constantly refer to "The Jason Thing," an ill-defined incident that may be linked to Alison's death. When Jason kisses Aria, Jenna expresses her fear that the two will hook up, and Jason will reveal his secret to Aria. The latest development is the possibility that Jenna will have a cornea replacement, which means that she may regain her vision at some point in the near future. Toby fills Spencer in on the details of the matter after she overhears Jenna discussing the possibility with a nurse.

During "I Must Confess", Jenna teases the girls after the assembly, asserting that Alison could have used the lesson on bullying. Emily shoots the same accusation back at Jenna and snidely tells her to move her walking stick.

Throughout "Over My Dead Body", someone shows up to the precinct, prompting Garrett to say "you shouldn't be here." He was presumably talking to Jenna. Garrett then leads Marshall to the other side of the glass of the investigation room. He locks the door, and Jenna laments that she cannot see their faces. During a conversation afterward, it is revealed that they wrote the note to Jason, making him suspect of murdering his own sister, and that Jason figured out that he is not the culprit. Garrett hands Jenna a note and instructs her to take it home and burn it. Marshall asks whether it is page 5, and Reynolds doesn't contradict her assumption. Before kissing him goodbye, Jenna remarks, "she deserved to die like that".

In the prequel episode "The First Secret" Jenna is first mentioned by Toby in a conversation with Emily. While unpacking some of Marshall's belongings from the moving truck, Cavanaugh describes her as someone who obtains whatever she wants. Later, at the costume shop, Alison spots then-new girl Jenna purchasing a Lady GaGa costume. Ali attempts to intimidate her into buying a different disguise, declaring that she picked a similar outfit. Marshall noncommittally agrees to think about a change of heart, but turns her attention away from Alison. Before walking away, Ali offers her name, to which Jenna replies that she already knows it. They smile pleasantly, if not falsely, at each other, and Alison strolls away. At Noel's Halloween party, Alison notices Jenna dressed as Lady GaGa after all. Noel, dressed as a gynecologist, goes right to her. When a Lady GaGa song starts playing, Ali approaches Marshall. Jenna is flanked by boys, but they all scram when Alison orders them to. Ali then offers to befriend Jenna, thereby making her popularity in Rosewood a guaranteed thing. However, Marshall turns her down and says that she likes to pick her own friends. When Jenna saunters away victoriously, Mona declares her the best Gaga, and the two introduce themselves, seemingly starting a friendship. Outside on the porch, a sulky Ali jealously calls Jenna a slut. Back at the party, Emily is seen slow-dancing with Ben on the dance floor. Jenna is seductively dancing nearby, and Emily ogles appreciatively at her curves and moves. Alison turns her eyes from one to the other, and approaches Emily, alluding to her concealed sexual orientation.

During "A Hot Piece of 'A'", Marshall argues with Garrett over the phone and refuses to let him in the house. Reynolds states that it was a mistake for them to bring a third person in on their plan. Later, she leaves for her eye surgery in Boston without Garrett.

Throughout "Let the Water Hold Me Down", it is revealed that Jenna went to the Kristen August Rehabilitation Center For The Blind after the "Jenna Thing" happened.

In "Eye of the Beholder", Jenna's eye is bandaged, implying she got the surgery. During the episode, someone lures Jenna to the DiLaurentis residence and then sets it on fire, trapping Jenna inside with the intent to murder her. She is rescued by Hanna, who happened to be nearby the household. Marshall goes to the hospital and stays there under observation. This marks the first time in the series that Jenna appears to be frightened. Marshall asks to see the Liars. While they're in her hospital room, Jenna asks whether it is true that Hanna pulled her out of the fire. When Hanna confirms this, Jenna Marshall her why she did it and seems grateful for having been rescued. Hanna doesn't answer her question, but simply replies "you're welcome". Later, "A" is seen planting Garret's police badge at the scene of the fire, in order to implicate him in Jenna's attack. Since Marshall is still in the hospital when this occurred, she is officially ruled out as the one behind the "A" scheme.

During "If These Dolls Could Talk", Jenna removes the bandage from her eye and cryptically begins to cry. Later, at school, she approaches the Liars at their lunch table and apologizes for gaining a hatred towards them, saying that when Hanna's actions made her realize that people are capable of changing. However, her apology is met with suspicion by all four girls. She shares with them the "unfortunate results" of her surgery. Later, Toby comes into her room questioning Marshall as to why Garrett is watching their house. She affirms not knowing the reason and asks Cavanaugh to close the curtains. Marshall pulls a slip of paper from a box on her night table, and gives it to him. Telling him that it was given to her by Garrett and was told to keep it safe. She lies, playing stupid, and claiming to not know what it is. Toby opens it, revealing it to be the missing Page 5 of Alison DiLaurentis' autopsy report. They then head to the police station to hand it to the authorities. At the end of the episode, she is seen smacking a fly on her mirror and removes its corpse. Afterward, Marshall turns back to her mirror with a sneaky smirk and continues to remove her makeup, revealing that she is indeed able to see.

In "Unmasked", Jenna has a mysterious secret meeting with someone at a park and gives something to the individual, stating that "they're all going to be at the party, you know what you need to do". Marshall is later seen at the masquerade party spying on Aria, and engaging in a conversation with Lucas and the Black Swan.

=== Season 3 ===
At some point before or after the new "A" arises, Jenna begins working with them and joins the A-Team, though it is unclear to what extent.

The character's return for the third season happened in "Blood is the New Black", when the Liars have reason to believe that Jenna is faking her blindness when Toby stumbles upon prescription eye drops dated after Jenna's eye surgery. To test this theory, the Liars planted an earring in the girls' bathroom at school and remained hidden in the stalls. Jenna is proven to be faking her blindness when she picks up and examines the earring. The girls decided to keep quiet about this newfound knowledge so that they could possibly use Jenna's secret against her.

During "Kingdom of the Blind", Emily sees a flashback of Jenna driving her the night she was drugged and taken to Alison's dug-up grave. Marshall is later seen pressuring Aria to find out how much Emily remembers from "that night." The girls follow Jenna to a gun shop, in which Hanna confronts a clearly not-blind Marshall behind the wheel of her car. Jenna tells them that she's been able to see from the first operation and kept this information a secret because "it was the only protection" she had.

Throughout "That Girl is Poison", Marshall, who has by then openly revealed she can see again, invites the Liars to attend her birthday party. This prompts Spencer to question the purpose of Jenna's party. Marshall appears at school without her trademark shades and cane. All the students except the Liars congratulate her. She later throws a birthday party at the coffee house.

In "Crazy", CeCe Drake prank dials Jenna and warns her not to date Nate St. Germain (whom she was flirting with at the time) in an attempt to bring him closer to Emily. CeCe assures her she'll scratch her eyes out if she spots her with him and lies about being his girlfriend.

During "What Lies Beneath", Jenna is seen by Nate and Emily at the Brew chatting to Noel Kahn. When Noel goes to practice, Nate approaches Marshall and divulges to her that he has a gift but never got a proper chance to hand it because she ditched him. Jenna ignores his attempts of wooing her but Nate refuses to let her go. Once Nate chooses to leave, Jenna is seen sitting back down.

In "Single Fright Female", Nate discovers Marshall had been faking her blindness for a while and calls her out for acting like she can't see him. Later, Jenna shows up at Emily's house a little frightened, claiming she needs to tell her something. After seeing that she has company, Jenna just warns Fields to be very careful with whom she spends time and is seen getting into a cab and potentially leaving town since the driver was placing luggage in the trunk.

Throughout "A Dangerous Game", Jenna is seen at her house talking on her phone. Newspapers and mail are piled up on the front porch as if the house has been uninhabited for a while. Someone is watching her through the window and sends a text message as "A" with a meeting time and place. Jenna simultaneously receives a text message, gets off her phone, and looks out the window, but no one is standing there. We find out later in the episode that it was Spencer watching and taking photos of Jenna, but the text was sent to Toby. Marshall later meets with Shana in the park and they appear to be very friendly. She discloses to Shana Fring that "they" will all be there Friday and reminds her friend of what has to be done. Shana questions Jenna about her doctor's appointment and Marshall implies she may be losing her sight again, with Shana assuring her that even in her darkest days, she'll be there for her. While out for a run, Emily sees Melissa Hastings entering Marshall's house. Inside, the two seem to be arguing with Jenna informing Melissa that "they have the tapes" and Melissa replying that "those bitches will be at the lodge at 9." Melissa proceeds to hand Shana a copy of the invitation. The night of the "party" Toby sees a girl in the woods just before he gets knocked out from behind. The woman is believed to be Jenna, though it was never confirmed. We later witness the four Liars and Mona driving back to Rosewood. They come upon Wilden's police car that Hanna and Aria previously pushed into a lake. A video recorder suddenly plays the incident where Hanna's mom ran over Wilden, but this time they see that afterwards, Marshall and Shana rushed over to his body and dragged him away.

=== Season 4 ===
During the fourth season's premiere, "'A' Is for A-l-i-v-e", Mona confirms that Jenna and Shana knew each other before coming to Rosewood, and further claims Marshall feared Melissa. In a later scene, Jenna approaches Emily outside her house. Because of the way the scene is shot, we can see that Jenna is losing her sight again. We also notice Marshall has a burn on her hand, further implying she was at Thornhill the night of the fire. Jenna divulges to Emily that she and Wilden were friends and that she has a message for Toby in case anything bad happens to her. According to Marshall, everyone who met Alison the night she went missing ends up dead, meaning Wilden saw Ali, something Garrett disclosed to her. Since Toby isn't taking any of Jenna's calls and Marshall knows Cavanaugh and Emily remain friends, she asks Emily to tell him that she never meant to hurt him. Later, at Wilden's funeral we see that Marshall is wearing her glasses again and being escorted by Nigel Wright, indicating her vision continues to decline.

In "Face Time", it is revealed that the reason Jenna, Melissa and Shana were working with Wilden and the "A-Team" was because he was blackmailing them to do so, under the orders of someone else (later revealed to be Big "A").

Throughout "Into the Deep", Spencer and Aria eavesdrop on a conversation Shana and Jenna are having. It is revealed Marshall believes Alison is still alive. Later, Jenna is seen with Shana at Emily's surprise birthday party. Spencer asks Marshall if she's losing her sight because she is wearing her sunglasses, but Jenna replies " I see everything I need to". Aria begs Marshall to tell her what she knows, but Jenna seems afraid. Later, Emily finds a body face down in the lake, revealed to be Marshall. Someone hit her on the back of the head and she fell into the lake. Jenna is unconscious, but still alive and taken to a hospital. At the hospital, Spencer asks Shana who Marshall is afraid of, and Fring replies "Cece Drake".

During the fourth season's finale, "'A' Is for Answers", Alison revealed that she originally believed Jenna to be "A" so she visited Marshall at the hospital. Ali who at this point was trying to find out who A was threatens Jenna to not come back to town. Once she turned around to leave, she received a text from A, that read "Bitch can't see you, but I do. Tonight is the night I kill you", which eliminated Marshall as a suspect.

=== Season 5 ===
In the series' 100th episode "Miss Me x 100" a bus rolls to a stop across the street, and when the vehicle drives away, Jenna, who has arrived back in Rosewood, comes face to face with Alison, Aria and Ezra. Later while sitting on her bedroom floor crying, Marshall hears movement around her room and calls out, “whose there?” only to get no response. At Aria's front door, Jenna demands to know what Aria was doing in her house. Montgomery asks her if she wants to come inside for a cup of tea but all Marshall would like is an answer. Aria tells her she heard about Shana's death and wanted to see if she was doing okay, prompting Jenna to wonder why she'd even care. Aria reminds that Alison's return has brought back a lot of bad memories for most senior students at Rosewood High. Marshall reminds Montgomery that she still has loyal friends, while she on the other hand, doesn't have anyone left. As Jenna is turning to leave, Aria again offers her tea, informing her that while she didn't know Shana, Jenna could tell her all about Shana. Turning back around, Marshall tells Aria that having someone to chat with would help. Pulling up to a picnic ground, Sydney Driscoll and Jenna step out of Sydney's car. Driscoll comments on the Mustang parked in front of them, and Marshall reveals it used to be hers. Walking over to Mona, Sydney informs her the Liars do not want things to go back to the way they were. Jenna makes a remark on how she remembers Ali treating her friends like dolls. Mona deduces that maybe they can get rid of Alison. The three girls turn to look as a third car pulls up.

During "March of Crimes", Jenna comes enters the music room and is greeted by Alison. Ali makes a remark on how she was unaware that Jenna had enrolled at Rosewood High. Jenna states that she came back a few weeks ago, and that nobody seemed to notice since most students were too busy paying attention to Alison. Ali mentions that she's sorry about Shana's passing, and that she meant a lot to her too. Thanking her, Marshall says that she's sorry for Alison as well and that she heard about the break-in last night. When Jenna starts walking out, Alison asks her to wait before wondering how Jenna managed to turn Shana against her. Looking over her shoulder, Marshall assures Alison she brought it on herself. Walking out of a consulting room, Jenna and Sydney stop when Emily calls out Sydney. As Emily asks Driscoll what she's doing at the Optometrists, Marshall explains that Sydney was her ride, before asking if it posed a problem. Emily wonders when Jenna and Sydney became friends, and when Marshall attempts to get Sydney to walk away with her, Spencer instructs Sydney to answer Emily's questions. Stepping in, Jenna says that it sounded more like an accusation, and when Emily asks Driscoll why she never mentioned being friends with Jenna. This leads to a heated argument, and Marshall eventually leaves accompanied by Sydney. Later on the episode, Driscoll reveals to Emily that she met Jenna when she volunteered at a school for the visually impaired and have remained friends ever since the day Alison visited Marshall to threaten her. Driscoll returned to Rosewood per Marshall's request, fearing that Alison would bully her once more.

Throughout "How the 'A' Stole Christmas", Jenna is part of the school choir who are singing Christmas songs for the Shady Days Nursing Home, alongside Paige, Emily, Lucas and Sydney. Unbeknownst at the time, Jenna is one of Alison's followers at the Masquerade Ice Ball. Still wearing a mask, Jenna and another one of Alison's followers, later revealed as Driscoll, pose for a photo with Lucas, who is dressed as Santa Claus. Lucas tells the two masked beauties to come in closer, and after the photo is taken, he wishes them a Merry Christmas. After gaining Emily's attention, Marshall and Sydney begin walking through the crowd, with Driscoll looking over her shoulder to make sure Emily would follow her trace. As Emily enters the room which has been draped off with fabric, Jenna sits on the couch, while Sydney reveals herself to Emily and explains that she led Emily to an isolated location because she didn't want Alison to witness them talking. As Driscoll walks towards Jenna, Emily tells Sydney that she really gets around, and questions if Jenna knows Sydney is with Alison now. Jenna then takes off her mask and reveals to Emily they suspect Alison of being accountable for Mona's murder.

=== Season 6 ===
Jenna is mentioned by the girls as being Lucas Gottesman's date to their senior prom as they see a photo of the two on their phones.

In "Game Over, Charles", Jenna made a brief cameo during a flashback, as the Liars were exiting the church after Wilden's funeral and watching the woman in a black veil entering a limo.

=== Season 7 ===
During "Hit and Run, Run, Run", Jenna appears at The Radley whilst the Liars are discussing the events that lead to Elliott's death. As she bumps into the girls, they are speechless at her unexpected reemergence and she explains that her return to Rosewood is due to Toby and Yvonne's engagement. Later, Toby arrives at the police station and crosses paths with his stepsister. He argues with Jenna about her arrival to town though she assures him that her intentions are to solely make amends. After Hanna and Mona find Hanna's golden bracelet on Elliott's car, they hear his burner phone ringing. When Mona answers the call, Jenna's voice is heard from the other end answering “Hi, Archer, can you hear me? It's Jenna, Jenna Marshall”, thus revealing Elliott's real name and that she's somehow involved in A.D.'s game.

Marshall remains around Rosewood in "Along Comes Mary" and befriends Sara Harvey, which troubles the Liars after Emily spots the two women amicably hanging out at the Rear Window Brew. Aria and Emily decided to investigate Archer's apartment and discover that Jenna was on his payroll for undisclosed reasons. At the end of the episode, she and Sara are having drinks at The Radley when an unknown figure approaches the two and reveals themselves to be Noel Kahn, who proceeds to join the duo. When confronted by Emily in regards to her involvement with Archer during "Wanted: Dead or Alive", Jenna admits she befriended Charlotte DiLaurentis after reading about her stay at Welby and reached out. In a flashback, Marshall is enlisted by Charlotte to track down the whereabouts of her birth mother and help Archer create an alias. Dunhill's plan was to purposely introduce himself to Alison under the "Elliott Rollins" pseudonym and later take advantage of her good intentions to benefit Charlotte's eventual release from Welby.

During "Original G'A'ngsters", the Liars witness Jenna mourn Sara's death after a team of paramedics arrive at The Radley to transport her body for further examination. All of the girls suspect Marshall was involved in Harvey's homicide and are certain that she put on an act in order to drive suspicion away from her. Later, Spencer and Hanna manage to break into Jenna's room at The Radley with Caleb's aid, who disguised himself as a massager in order to steal from Marshall's bag the key that opens the mysterious box located under her bed. In it, the girls find several papers but their investigation process is interrupted by the sound of someone slowly opening the door. The person hides Mary's old Radley Sanitarium file inside the box and is revealed to be Noel Kahn, who is seen angrily dialing Dr. Cochran (the person who handled the birth of both Mary's children).

In "The DArkest Knight", Mona and Caleb manage to bug Jenna's cellphone and eavesdrop a voice message she left for Noel after he failed to return any of her calls. Afterward, Hanna contacts Mona to help her return to Rosewood with a convincing narrative after having abducted Noel. Once Hanna successfully fabricates a story to the police on how she went to Hollybrook to track down the girl Kahn pushed down a flight of stairs at a frat party, Mona purposely bumps into Marshall at The Radley. Jenna is given an ultimatum to conspire with the Liars, after Mona implies that Marshall's partnership with Noel would send both of them to prison. Jenna initially subdues to Mona's coercion, seeing as her and Caleb later await for Marshall by the Radley's bar. Nonetheless, Jenna manages to trick the duo after hiring Sydney to pose as a decoy and serve them coffee. When the Liars head to the shed Noel was secluded, the Liars panic as soon as they realize he's missing as well as a camera Hanna used in an attempt to record a confession of him admitting he's their tormentor. A few seconds later, the girls receive a text message ordering them to show up in 1465, Elm Street at 10 pm. Once they arrive at the location, the Liars make their way inside an abandoned school for blind students where they're held hostage by Noel and Jenna, with the later tracking them down at gunpoint. During the cat-and-mouse chase, Emily and Hanna end up fighting Noel which causes Kahn to stumble upon an axe that decapitates him. Jenna takes aim at the Liars only to backfire, until a second gunshot is heard and it injures Spencer. As Marshall prepares to finish her off, Mary Drake suddenly emerges from behind and knocks her out. While Drake attempts to help Spencer, an unknown figure drags Jenna away from the building. At the end of the episode, the anonymous entity places her in the back of a van, while she questions them if they were responsible for the gunshot that hit Spencer. As the mysterious figure proceeds to rip off an old man's mask and toss it over to Jenna's side, Marshall feels it up and realizes that A.D. was the one who rescued her.

At the end of "Playtime", Jenna is seated in A.D.'s lair, sipping tea. She thanks the unidentified individual for the drink and reminds them of their promise to update her on the "game". Dressed in a nurse's uniform, A.D. drops a binder on Marshall's lap with pages of information written in braille. After Jenna reads a paragraph, she mutters the word "endgame" and grins in delight.

During "These Boots Were Made for Stalking", Jenna walks into the police station in order to come clean about her actions and interrupts a conversation between Spencer and detective Marco Furey. Marshall reports that she kept a low profile after the events that took place at the abandoned school for blind students to avoid being harmed by Noel. According to Jenna, Noel was accountable for Sara Harvey's homicide and she feared to be his ensuing victim. Kahn recruited Jenna with the assertion that Charlotte left enough money in her will to afford Marshall another eye surgery. Nevertheless, Jenna suspected Noel of stealthily plotting to steal the cash all to himself since his parents had financially cut him off. In an attempt to spare her life, Marshall brought a gun to the deserted sight school as an act of self-defense and pretended to hold a grudge against the Liars. After Jenna describes her side of the story, Furey orders one of his associates to escort Marshall to a conference room so she can make an official statement. As Jenna exits the room, Spencer claims that she's an unreliable narrator. However, Furey informs Spencer that the authorities don't have any evidence against Marshall because the bullet that injured Spencer didn't match the gun found at the location. A few hours afterwards, Emily spots Jenna exiting the Brew accompanied by an entourage of blind individuals. Marshall pauses right by the coffee shop's doorway and instructs her phone to send a text. A faint beeping is heard from across the café and the recipient is revealed to be Addison Derringer, a local Rosewood High student whom Emily has disciplinary issues with. She instantly suspects Addison of being in cahoots with Jenna. Later in the episode, Mona and Hanna are having a business meeting at The Radley's bar when Jenna suddenly walks in to meet her newest associates. Marshall is wearing an exact replica of the dress Hanna designed for Katherine Daly, but in white instead of black. Mona and Hanna storm up and confront Jenna, who gleefully divulges it was a gift but refuses to acknowledge the identity of its purchaser. Hanna, alongside Caleb, decides to stalk Marshall and her group of friends to the building where Hanna's cobbler works. The couple suspect Jenna is planning to steal the shoes that the senator's daughter was supposed to wear to counterpart the dress. Once Marshall's clique heads inside the building, Caleb engages in a face-off with Jenna in order to buy Hanna sufficient time to sneak into the cobbler's office to regain her shoes. After Marshall is cornered by Caleb, she explains to him that she's on her way to rehearse for a concert since there's a studio on the top floor. Caleb points out that her friends didn't bring any musical instruments and as Jenna suggests him to back off, he replies with the same statement before pointing out that Marshall couldn't have worn a specific dress without a helping hand. Jenna attempts to flee but Caleb takes a hold of her cane to warn Marshall that the cops were beginning to find inconsistencies in her allegations. Jenna assures Caleb they won't be able to prosecute her since Noel was the only person who could contradict her statement.

Throughout "Hold Your Piece", Aria and Emily team up to track down Sydney's whereabouts in hopes of finding Jenna. After searching her name online, they discover that Driscoll graduated from Berkeley College, with a double major in Economics and French. Sydney currently resides in a loft at Fishtown, Philadelphia, whilst working as a bank teller at a private department that services extremely wealthy clients. The girls also learn that Sydney checked into a charity gala for the Manhattan Children's Hospital, the same ball where Katherine made an appearance wearing Hanna's dress. Following this enlightenment, Emily googles the event and comes across a picture of Daly posing on a red carpet whilst Driscoll sneakily uses a phone to photograph her dress. The girls deduce that Sydney's loyalty to Marshall places her as the strongest contender serving as Spencer's shooter. They conclude Driscoll most likely made adjustments for Marshall to be clothed in a duplicate of Hanna's dress so Jenna could omit the truth from the authorities. Aria promptly suggests for her and Emily to head over to Sydney's address to gather more insight into the situation. Following a quick lesson from Caleb on spying techniques, Aria instructed Emily to approach Driscoll and clone her phone. During a conversation with Sydney, Emily was told that she was trying to distance herself from Marshall but that information proved to be false. Through access to Driscoll's phone, the girls discover that Sydney had an appointment at the Vogel Vision Institute and eavesdrop on the meeting. Turns out Driscoll was paying for an operation to give Jenna her sight back and she uttered the initials "A.D." as the donor for the cost. After Sydney exits the clinic, Aria and Emily aggressively confront her. Driscoll still claimed to not knowing where Marshall was, so Aria slipped a tracker in her bag to maintain her under their radar.

In "Till Death Do Us Part", Addison joins her friends in the hallway, when Jenna approaches them. It turns out that Marshall is the new Life Skills teacher at Rosewood High. Jenna orders Derringer and her friends to get to class, and Addison tries to make her entourage of friends laugh by waving her hand in front of Marshall's face. Unexpectedly, Jenna catches it and frightens Derringer by stating "I may be blind, but I can still smell a bitch from a mile away". A few days later, Spencer's identical twin sister, Alex Drake, is sitting on a bench outside of Veronica's law office. Jenna emerges from the building with Mrs. Hastings, and the two women briefly discuss a legal situation involving Addison's behavior at school. After Veronica leaves, Marshall sniffs the air around Alex and questions her on whether she's sporting a new perfume. Alex laughs it off, explaining that she spent the morning taking care of Spencer's rescue horse, before heading in the opposite direction. After she walks away, Jenna pulls out her phone and calls Toby to warn him that there's an impostor posing as his ex-girlfriend. When Spencer asks Alex about Marshall's involvement in the "A" game, her sister explains that Jenna requested Noel to search for her whereabouts. Marshall was aware Charlotte had another sister and that she left Alex her possessions. Although Marshall was unaware of Alex's physical appearance, she offered to do her bidding in exchange for one last chance to regain her eyesight. Alex paid for Jenna's treatments, which proved unsuccessful, therefore becoming counterproductive to her agenda.
