= 'A' Is for A-l-i-v-e =

- Pretty Little Liars episode
- Hanna, Emily, Spencer and Aria arriving at the church for Wilden's funeral.
- Episode no.: Season 4 Episode 1
- Directed by: I. Marlene King
- Written by: I. Marlene King
- Cinematography by: Larry Reibman
- Editing by: Lois Blumenthal
- Original air date: June 11, 2013

Guest appearances
- Tammin Sursok as Jenna Marshall; Sean Faris as Gabriel Holbrook; Larisa Oleynik as Maggie Cutler; Andrea Parker as Jessica DiLaurentis; Nia Peeples as Pam Fields; Karla Droege as Marion Cavanaugh; Wyatt Nash as Nigel Wright; Mercy Malik as a Newscaster

Episode chronology
← Previous "A Dangerous Game"	Next → "Turn of the Shoe"
- Pretty Little Liars (season 4)

"'A' Is for A-l-i-v-e" is the first episode and premiere of the fourth season of the American mystery drama television series Pretty Little Liars, and is the 72nd episode overall, which aired on ABC Family on June 11, 2013. The episode was written and directed by showrunner I. Marlene King, marking the second episode King has directed for the TV series.

In the episode, Aria, Emily, Hanna, and Spencer try to find answers by questioning Mona about her knowledge of "A", in addition the Liars deal with different personal problems which they are facing. As they try to find out if Alison really is alive, Wilden's body is discovered which leads the new police officer Holbrook to investigate the case. to Meanwhile, Jessica DiLaurentis moves back to Rosewood, which begins to concern the girls.

"'A' Is for A-l-i-v-e" was watched by 2.97 million viewers and garnered a 1.3 rating, up from the previous episode, the third-season finale, and up 15 per cent from the third-season premiere a year ago. The episode was met with positive reviews from television critics as many was pleased with the improvement of the show and the answers of questions which many were wondering about. Many also agreed that the premiere reminded critics of the first season.

== Plot ==
The contents of the trunk of Wilden's car is revealed to be a pig's corpse. The girls flee the scene, with Mona removing the disk showing footage of Ashley running over Wilden. In an attempt to earn some of their trust, Mona reveals a bunch of secrets to the PLLs. The next morning, the girls discover Wilden dead in the street by the church surrounded by coroners. It is revealed that Wilden was one of two people who wore the Queen of Hearts costume on the Halloween train. Mona says the other was Melissa but the computer is hacked and wiped before she can prove it. Mona is now "A"'s target along with the rest of the Liars.

Jessica DiLaurentis returns to Rosewood, but her intentions are unclear. Toby receives a text from "A" asking for the "A" van in exchange for information about his mother's death. "A" plants Ashley's cell phone in Wilden's casket, which Spencer and Mona retrieve based on a tip from "A." At Wilden's funeral, a mysterious woman dressed in a black veil appears and the PLLs meet Detective Gabriel Holbrook who is investigating the murders of Detective Wilden and Garrett Reynolds. The Liars and Mona then receive a text message from "A," which reveals that she was present the night they found Wilden's car and caught a video of it.

The Black Widow, the woman dressed in a black veil, is revealed to be on the "A" team and is seen in the RV placing a doll of Mona up with the five Liars. She then lifts up her veil, revealing that she is wearing the Alison mask that Red Coat wears but now half burned.

== Production ==
The episode was written and directed by showrunner I. Marlene King, making it the second episode which she has directed. The title of the episode was announced on March 5, 2013, by Entertainment Online. In addition, it was announced that Marion, Toby's mother, would be introduced in the season premiere. The episode featured the songs "Kill Of The Night" by Gin Wigmore, "Whispers" by Dave Baxter, "If I Lose Myself" by OneRepublic, "Hurricane" by Ms Mr, "Bodies" by The Duke Spirit and "The Devil Within" by Digital Daggers. The episode focuses on the Liars trying to figure out what happened at the Lodge and to get answers from Mona regarding "A". It focuses on Hanna becoming friends with Mona again, Emily's focus on getting into colleges, Aria dealing with the aftermath of breaking up with Ezra and Spencer trying to solve what happened at the Lodge. It also includes Jessica DiLaurentis, Alison's mother, moving back to Rosewood.

On October 4, 2012, ABC Family renewed the series for a fourth season. On January 17, 2013, it was announced that the fourth season would start airing on June 11, 2013. Filming for the premiere began on March 11, 2013. On March 21, 2013, it was announced that Sean Faris would join the show and would be playing Pennsylvania state police officer Gabriel Holbrook.
