= A (Pretty Little Liars) =

Fictional character

- Pretty Little Liars character
- First appearance: Pretty Little Liars (2006)
- Created by: Sara Shepard
- Adapted by: I. Marlene King; Roberto Aguirre-Sacasa; Lindsay Calhoon Bring

In-universe information
- Aliases: Alison; A-moji; A.D.
- Identity: Television; Mona Vanderwaal (seasons 1-2); Charlotte DiLaurentis (seasons 3-6A); Alex Drake (seasons 6B-7); Archie Waters (Original Sin); Novels; Mona Vanderwaal; Alison DiLaurentis; Nick Maxwell (Alison's Helper)
- Pathology: Stalker; Spy; Blackmailer; Torturer; Manipulator; Serial Killer (Original Sin and Novels)
- M.O.: Spying on targets to discover secrets, taunting and threatening their victims via phone Killing his victims (Original Sin)
- Location: Rosewood, Pennsylvania (Pretty Little Liars); Millwood, Pennsylvania (Original Sin)

"A" is a fictional character in the Pretty Little Liars franchise. Created by author Sara Shepard in 2006, the character serves as the main antagonist in both the television and book series. "A" has also appeared in the web series Pretty Dirty Secrets (2012).

Working as an anonymous figure, "A" is a stalker who blackmails, manipulates and tortures the main characters of the franchise. In the novel and television series, "A" has been revealed as multiple characters.

== Development ==
=== Characterization ===
In the original television series, all three characters who take up the identity of "A" are mentally ill women seeking revenge for something that has negatively altered their lives. "A" frequently manipulates, blackmails, and tortures. "A" has a love for riddles and dolls, usually referring to the Liars as their own living dolls.

In Original Sin and the novels, "A" kills multiple people in order to achieve their goals.

== Book series storylines ==
=== The first "A" ===
- Real identity: Mona Vanderwaal.

Three years after the disappearance of Alison DiLaurentis, her four friends, Aria Montgomery, Spencer Hastings, Emily Fields, and Hanna Marin each receive messages from someone calling themselves "A". Since Alison's disappearance, the girls had drifted apart and had no idea that other people were receiving texts as well. The texts referenced secrets that only Alison would have known. At first, the messages were simply teasing and the girls suspected that their missing friend sent them. They knew she was most likely dead, but believed Alison to be the only one who knew those secrets. When Alison's body is discovered in her old backyard, the girls are baffled when they continue to receive text messages. At Alison's funeral, the girls are reunited and they find out that they've all been receiving weird messages. As the girls stand outside after the funeral ends, they all get a text saying, "I'm still here, bitches. And I know everything. –A".

From that point on, the messages take on a distinctly more threatening tone. Aria is given an ultimatum to tell her mother about her father's affair by midnight after the Foxy event, or "A" will do it for her. "A" continues to play life-altering games with the girls, such as encouraging suspicion of Spencer's involvement in Alison's death and outing Emily's sexuality to her conservative mother. However, "A" makes a mistake when texting Hanna on the night of Mona's birthday party. Instead of using the plain Blackberry she bought just for tormenting the girls, "A" accidentally uses her personal phone. Hanna, who has a new phone without all of her contacts registered, recognizes the number, compelling "A" to act before Hanna can reveal "A's" true identity to the others. "A" hits Hanna with an SUV, successfully destroying Hanna's phone and putting her into a coma that eventually leads to a temporary loss of memory. However, "A" knows that there is a very good chance Hanna will regain her memory.

Hanna's best friend, Mona Vanderwaal, informs the girls that she has also received texts from "A", drawing the five closer together in trying to figure out who their tormentor is. Mona subtly encourages Spencer's fears that her sister, Melissa, might be "A" as well as Alison's killer. During Hanna's party to celebrate her recovery, she suddenly regains her memory, revealing that Mona is "A". However, she, Emily, and Aria can't do much about it, because Spencer and Mona are on their way to the police station. After Spencer is warned about Mona by text, she tries to escape Mona's car, but Mona catches on quickly and diverts to a path in a more remote area of Rosewood.

Mona tells Spencer that she saw Alison launch a firework into Toby Cavanaugh's garage, blinding her friend Jenna and leaving Mona with a scar on her stomach. Mona also shares that she found Alison's diary among a pile of old DiLaurentis items that the St. Germains had left on the curb, discovering the girls' secrets that only Alison knew. Mona's motivation was to get revenge for Jenna's blindness — she didn't know that Jenna and Alison had planned together to launch the firework. Finally, Mona reveals that Ian Thomas killed Alison, due to Alison giving him an ultimatum to break up with Melissa — an incident Mona read about in Alison's diary. She then gives Spencer a chance to become "A" alongside her, suggesting that Hanna must not be remembering correctly, but Spencer refuses. The two fight at Floating Man's Quarry and Spencer accidentally pushes Mona, causing her to fall and for her neck to be trapped between the rocks.

=== The second "A" ===
- Real Identity: Alison DiLaurentis.

Alison DiLaurentis felt her life was ruined by her twin sister, Courtney DiLaurentis, who was considered smarter and kinder than her. Alison began emotionally manipulating Courtney into pretending to be Alison, eventually tricking Courtney into pretending to strangle her. Courtney is sent to a mental hospital as a result and the ashamed DiLaurentis' erase all trace of her. Alison becomes Queen Bee at her new school. Courtney is allowed a short trip home to see her family, but while there sees Spencer, Hannah, Aria Montgomery and Emily arguing outside and goes out to talk to them, which makes her parents believe she is Alison. The real Alison insists that's not true, but because of her manipulating Courtney into pretending to be her, her parents think she is lying. A vengeful Alison is taken away to the mental hospital.

The girls begin receiving messages from "A" again, terrifying them. They believe the messages to be a cruel joke at first, but then discover Ian Thomas's body — murdered by the second "A," who then steals Ian's body to convince everyone that the death was a hoax. "A" mocks the girls over text and pretends to be Ian on an online account, giving the girls information such as Spencer being the product of an affair between her father and Alison's mother. "A" causes Spencer to be scammed out of $2000, taunts Aria with photos, manipulates Hanna so she is sent to a mental hospital and forces Emily to go to Lancaster to look into Wilden. "A" sends the girls on many searches to try and find out who "A" could be and murders Jenna. They eventually plant all the evidence of a random person. The girls are fooled by this, happy it is over.

The town is introduced to Courtney DiLaurentis who is Alison's ill twin sister who was kept in many clinics and hidden from the world. Courtney reveals herself to the girls as actually being Alison and that Courtney was pretending to be her and that she was the one who ran into the random person and died. Aria is suspicious, along with Wilden and Melissa. Melissa knew about the twins for a while because Jason and Alison's stories didn't match up with what Jason told her. The suspected murderer has an alibi and people begin digging up suspicious things about Alison. Alison kidnaps Melissa and traps her in a cupboard next to Ian's dead body.

At Alison's house, all of the girls get drunk and re-enact the day Alison went missing, they wake up to find a letter revealing that Courtney took Alison's place when they were young and the person the girls were friends with was actually Courtney, not Alison, and that she was sent to a mental hospital in her sisters place. When she came back, Alison killed Courtney. Alison then sets the house on fire with the girls in it, but they manage to escape with Melissa. The girls hope she was killed in the fire, but Emily left the door open for her.

After the third "A" (Nick) has been arrested, Alison escapes to a house that even Nick had no clue about and uses all of Nick's money for plastic surgery. Then, under a new alias, she begins tormenting the girls again. An obsessed fan group starts harassing the girls and she hires one, Greg, to infiltrate the Liars. He starts dating Spencer in hopes to do this, which works. Alison also pretends to be a famous artist's secretary to ruin Aria's potential career. She attempts to drown Emily in a pool for rejecting her and then murders her girlfriend Jordan which causes Emily to become depressed. Alison then frames the girls for her torture and murder by covering a house they broke into with her blood and weapons, and the girls are arrested.

Alison is able to avoid the girls as they attempt to find her before they are imprisoned. Alison is elated to discover she has caused Emily to drown herself and make Aria flee the country. Little did she know, Emily faked her death and managed to track Alison to her mother's house where she was hiding out. Alison confronts Emily with a gun and the two fight, with Emily holding off Alison long enough for the police to arrive. Alison is then arrested and the girls are exonerated.

=== The third "A" ===
- Real Identity: Nick Maxwell.

A third "A" begins tormenting the girls. Emily hopes it's Alison, and the rest of the girls hope it's not. The new "A" torments them about "The Jamaica Thing", Spencer's framing of Kelsey, Hanna's framing of Madison, and Emily's baby. "A" reveals that they killed Tabitha, not Aria, which means they have killed four people total - the other three being Gayle, Kyla, and Graham - and have injured many more, which makes this "A" the most violent yet. The girls suspect this "A" isn't just Alison, as she would not be strong enough to kill and hurt so many people by herself and begin to suspect she has an accomplice.

The girls are lured to a basement where Alison reveals that she is alive and that the third "A" is not her, but Nick Maxwell. Nick was Courtney's older boyfriend who met the real Alison at their shared mental clinic and has introduced himself to the girls as different people throughout their lives: Phineas, who sold Spencer drugs and got her addicted to them, eventually causing her to frame Kelsey for drugs; Jackson, a bartender who refused to help Hanna, causing her to get into a car crash with Madison; Olaf, Aria's Icelandic friend who stole a painting with her; Derrick, Emily's colleague who she would regularly gossip to. Nick and Alison have put a shrine to Alison in the basement and are going to make it seem as if the girls have killed themselves in honour of Alison. They leave and flood the basement with poisonous gas, but Nick is found and arrested by the police and the girls are saved. Alison escapes and abandons Nick.

Nick is later visited in prison by the girls and tells them Alison may be at his grandma's house or something connecting to her may be there.

== Television storylines ==
=== Pretty Little Liars (2010) ===
"A" began torturing Alison by sending her gifts, threats and soon attacking her while wearing a zombie costume on Halloween night 2008. "A" continued to mess with Alison and her mother, Jessica DiLaurentis, who believes "A" to be Spencer Hastings. After Alison's disappearance, "A" went away for a year but after the corpse of Bethany Young (believed to be Alison at the time) was found, she re-emerged. "A" began sending the Liars messages about things only Alison knew about them and soon began messing with their parents. Doctor Anne Sullivan had previously dealt with the person behind the hoodie and when "A" trashed her office she immediately recognized the person. She almost exposes her identity to the Liars but "A" kidnaps her and went as far as to threaten her son's life. But the Liars are still close to figuring it out and during the second half of season two they manage to get a hold of "A's" phone. They hatch a plan to catch her with this and it works. They find out that "A" had a lair at the Lost woods resort and Spencer and Mona ("A's" newest victim) head over there and find a room full of pictures of Alison and the girls along with a sketch of "A's" costume to the ball, the Black Swan. However, Spencer begins to notice other clues and soon realizes "A" is right there with her. She turns around to see Mona in a black hoodie, who reveals herself as "A". She kidnaps Spencer and gives her an opportunity to join the "A" team but Spencer declines and the two get into a fight, where Mona is pushed off of a cliff. Though Mona survives, she is sent to Radley Sanitarium for medical assistance. While in the psychiatric hospital, Mona takes up a partnership with a new accomplice that starts off the second game. After this, Mona became another henchman in the "A" hierarchy, obeying the orders of Big A, known as Red Coat, the captain of the A-Team. Mona was kicked off of the A-Team in the season three finale.

Big A often hid out at a lair situated in Room A at an apartment building at Mayflower Hill and a mobile RV which was stolen but Toby gave it back to "A" in exchange for information about his mother's death. It is revealed that Red Coat had been hiding out in the basement of the DiLaurentis house and drilled holes through the floor to spy on the family. In "'A' Is for Answers", the Liars are under attack by "A" who shoots Ezra Fitz on the rooftop. However, in the fifth-season premiere, the shooter is revealed to be Shana Fring who attempted to kill Alison but was later shoved off a stage by Aria and died from the impact. In the series' 100th episode, "A" planted a bomb in the Cavanaugh house which detonated, signaling her triumphant return to Rosewood. "A" later breaks into the Vanderwaal home and kidnaps Mona just as she is about to tell the Liars that Alison is "A" and covers up her kidnapping as a homicide. She then brings Mona to the Dollhouse and tortures her and forces her to dress up and act like Alison. Just as the Liars are being brought to jail, "A" kidnaps them and tortures them inside the Dollhouse. Inside, the liars discover that Big "A" is named Charlotte DiLaurentis. CeCe Drake reveals herself as "A" and tells her story; saying that she is transgender, was formerly known as Charles DiLaurentis, and became Charlotte DiLaurentis and later became "A" because the Liars were happy that Alison was gone. She worked with Sara Harvey and was also responsible for the "death" of Alison and the death of Wilden, and after telling her story, she is admitted to Welby State and her reign as "A" finally ends.

Five years later, Charlotte is released from Welby and murdered. A new "A", "A.D.", takes over and wants to find Charlotte's murderer. "A.D." is eventually discovered to be Alex Drake, the twin sister of Spencer Hastings and half-sister to Charlotte.

=== Pretty Little Liars (2022) ===
In the first season subtitled Original Sin, A is revealed to be Archie Waters. Archie is the illegitimate son of Rose Waters and Marshall Clanton, whose clandestine affair during high school resulted in Rose's pregnancy with Archie and his twin sister, Angela. Rose never let Archie out of the house and kept his existence a secret due to a facial disfigurement. Later, Clanton became the Vice Principal of Millwood High School, and Rose returned so Angela could attend the school and have a proper education. He and Rose decided not to tell Angela his identity as her father. In high school, Angela desperately wanted to fit in and joined Davie Adams' popular group. The group often did their best to embarrass, humiliate, and degrade Angela.

When Angela was raped by Davie's boyfriend, Tom Beasley, Davie forced the group to turn their backs on her. Davie made sure everyone in the school treated her as invisible and worthless. During a New Year's Eve party in 1999, Angela committed suicide in public after her pleas for help were ignored by everyone.

22 years later, Archie takes the identity of "A" to help his father avenge Angela and begins killing people who are considered bullies.

=== The A-Team ===
The A-Team is a group of anonymous characters that worked together as "A". The team was led by Red Coat for a while. Toby Cavanaugh is the first of the members to be revealed, though it is later revealed that he is a double agent. Spencer Hastings was the next, having joined the A-Team to find Toby. Both of them and Mona were kicked off in the third season finale. Sara Harvey is eventually revealed as a member of the A-Team. She was the main accomplice to Charlotte and acted as a decoy Red Coat at times. She has also been a Red Coat and was revealed as the Black Widow. In the final season, it is revealed that Jenna Marshall, Noel Kahn and Wren Kingston were also members. Sydney Driscoll was a helper to "A.D." and recruits Aria Montgomery.

Additionally, several characters have acted as an accomplice to "A", though were not a member of the A-Team, including Lucas Gottesman, Melissa Hastings, Darren Wilden and Mary Drake.

=== Other "A's" ===
Caleb Rivers took the role of "A" to trick Hanna into meeting him. Shana Fring pretended to be "A" to attack the Liars in New York. She donned a black hoodie and attacked them at the coffee shop, only to end up shooting Ezra instead, who had found out her identity. In the following episode, she continued to hunt down the Liars, and sent a group of black hoodies to trick them. The black hoodies used the alias "A" during their taunting of the Liars. Shana revealed herself to the girls and revealed that she wanted justice for Jenna. The Liars falsely believed that Shana was Big A.

== Disguises ==
Although typically wearing a signature black hoodie and gloves, "A" has worn a variety of disguises in the television series to spy on the Liars at various parties and events.

=== Red Coat ===
Red Coat is a disguise used by two members of the A-Team. Consisting of a knee length red trench coat, black skinny jeans and black heeled ankle boots, CeCe Drake took on the disguise to lead the A-Team and go out in public. Drake also hired Sara Harvey to act as a decoy whenever she couldn't sport the disguise in her assignments. Alison DiLaurentis occasionally used the disguise to protect her friends without revealing she was alive.

=== The Black Widow ===
The Black Widow is a previously anonymous character who attended detective Darren Wilden's funeral in "'A' Is for A-l-i-v-e". The disguise is all black clothing, with her face concealed by a black veil. The Black Widow is later shown to be a part of the A-Team, when she is seen inside the "A" R.V. placing a Mona doll with the rest of the "A" doll collection. She then lifts up her veil to reveal a burned Ali mask underneath, revealing that she was the Red Coat at the Lodge. In the fifth season, the disguise is seen inside one of "A's" lairs. In "Game Over, Charles", it is revealed that Sara Harvey was the Black Widow. Charlotte sent her to Wilden's funeral to make sure he was deceased. In "Of Late I Think of Rosewood", Sara shows up to Charlotte's funeral in a variation of the disguise, though this time revealing her face.

In a nightmare that Alison had during "How the 'A' Stole Christmas", her mom, Jessica DiLaurentis shows up as the Black Widow.

=== The Queen of Hearts ===
The Queen of Hearts is a previously anonymous character that made an appearance during the third season's Halloween special, "This Is a Dark Ride". In the fourth season's premiere, it is revealed that there were actually two of them in the Halloween train, Melissa Hastings and Darren Wilden. Wilden attacked Spencer and fought Paige, while Melissa drugged Aria and took her body. Wilden also murdered Garrett Reynolds fearing he'd expose his corrupt activities and Melissa later admits to Spencer that she was blackmailed into doing his bidding. However, in Mona's footage, evidence shows that Wilden tried to abandon the train and Melissa is heard ordering him to stay. Wilden would later place a fainted Aria in a box beside Garrett's corpse and then gathered with Melissa in an attempt to push them off the train. They fled the scene once Aria regained her consciousness and stabbed Wilden.

=== The Black Swan ===
The Black Swan is a previously anonymous character that made an appearance during the Masquerade Ball. Melissa was revealed to be the person behind the disguise in "Birds of a Feather". She claimed that "A" (Mona) threatened her, stating that her false pregnancy would've been exposed if she did not distract Jenna during the event. The disguise is inspired by Odile from Swan Lake.
