= CeCe Drake =

Fictional character

Cece Drake
- Pretty Little Liars character
- Charlotte eavesdropping on a conversation between Ezra and Aria taking place at his apartment.
- Portrayed by: Vanessa Ray
- Duration: 2012–17
- First appearance: "Unmasked" (Note: Charlotte DiLaurentis made her first uncredited appearance as Mona's Visitor in "UnmAsked", but was not formally introduced portrayed by Vanessa Ray until the third season episode "Crazy".); Season 2, episode 25 "Crazy" (Note: Her first physical appearance in the series.); Season 3, episode 7
- Last appearance: "Till Death Do Us Part"; Season 7, episode 20
In-universe information
- Other names: CeCe Drake; Charles Drake; Charles DiLaurentis; Charlie; Charlotte Drake "A"; Varjak; Alison DiLaurentis; Freddie
- Occupation: "A"; Red Coat; Stylist
- Father: Ted Wilson
- Mother: Mary Drake
- Adoptive father: Kenneth DiLaurentis
- Adoptive mother: Jessica DiLaurentis
- Half-sisters: Spencer Hastings; Alex Drake
- Aunts and uncles: Jessica DiLaurentis
- First cousins: Alison DiLaurentis; Jason DiLaurentis

Charlotte DiLaurentis is a fictional character created by I. Marlene King for the American television series Pretty Little Liars and its spin-off web series Pretty Dirty Secrets, portrayed by Vanessa Ray. Introduced in the third season under the pseudonym CeCe Drake, Charlotte was a friend and mentor to Alison DiLaurentis before her disappearance. After moving back to Rosewood two years later, Charlotte took over Mona Vanderwaal's reign as "A", an anonymous figure that blackmails, stalks and tortures the main characters of the franchise. Under another anonymous identity known as Red Coat, Charlotte created and led "the A-Team", a group of people who helped "A" in their schemes. During the sixth season, Charlotte is revealed to be Alison's cousin and adoptive sister. After being unmasked as "A", Charlotte revealed she was assigned male at birth as "Charles DiLaurentis" and underwent gender reassignment surgery in her youth. Charlotte was then killed off following the five year time jump, with the killer eventually being revealed as Mona the following season.

== Casting and development ==
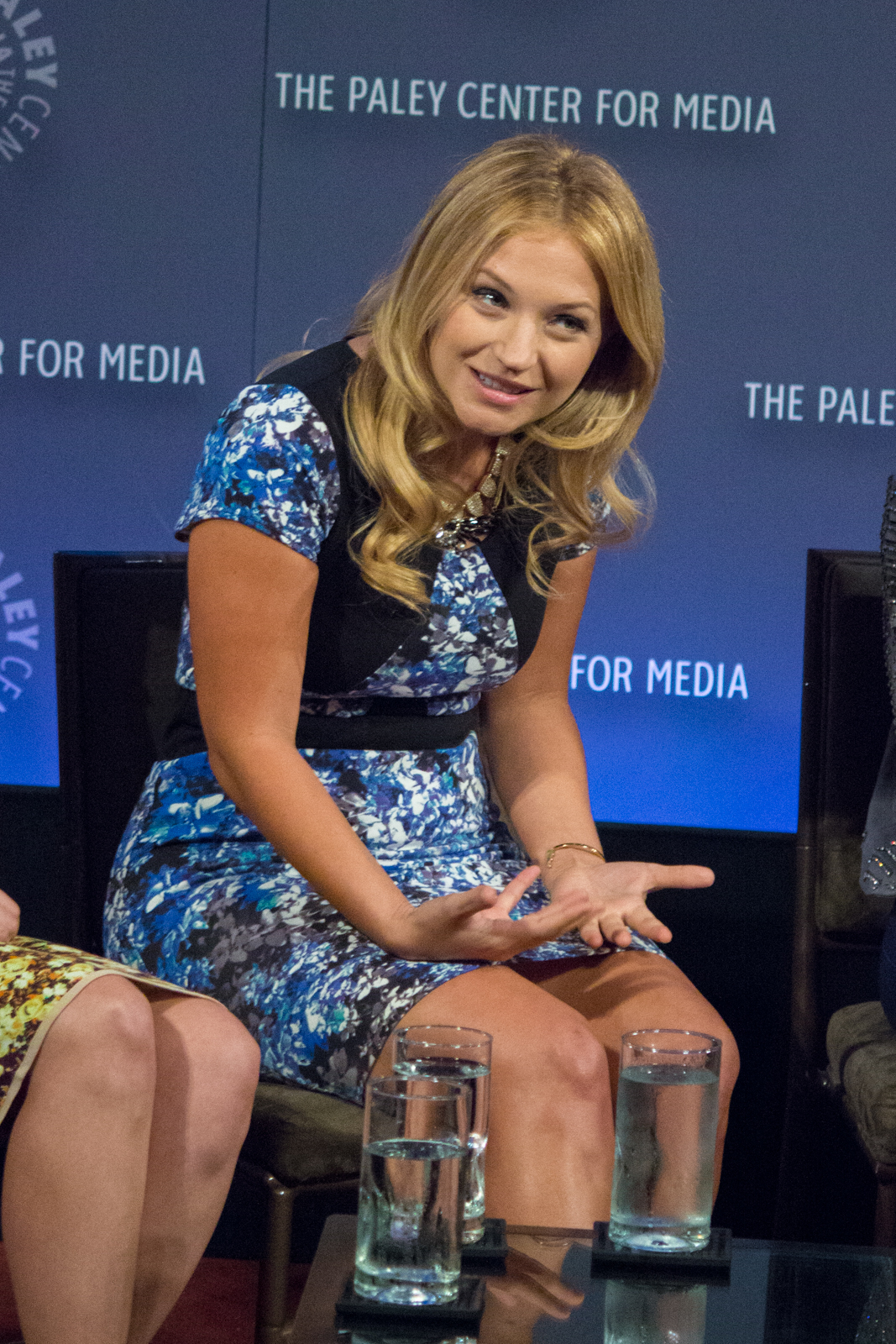
Vanessa Ray, the actress who played Drake throughout the series' run

It was reported that Vanessa Ray was cast to portray CeCe Drake, who was later known to be Charlotte DiLaurentis. When Ray was announced to start filming again for Pretty Little Liars fourth season, she spoke about returning, stating: "It's so fun to do, and what a crazy character I get to play. She's sort of a sociopath. I think she's so weird because she's, like, 22 but hangs out with high-schoolers. It's like, 'Hey, girl! Get a life!'" Drake was characterized as a "beyond-charismatic twenty-something blonde stylist at a boutique that has one heel in the present, one in the past." Pretty Little Liars executive producer Oliver Goldstick stated that Drake acted as a mentor to Alison DiLaurentis, teaching her "the wicked ways of the world." Drake's is described as having a sociopathic personality: controlling, charming, seductive, dominant, and extremely intelligent. The character was also described by Ray as "off-the-wall, self-centered, bizarre fashionista."

== Storylines ==
=== Background ===
Charlotte Drake, born as Charles Drake, was born to Mary Drake in Radley Sanitarium, a mental institution. Placed under the care of her mother's identical twin sister, Jessica DiLaurentis, Drake was raised as the sister of Jessica's kids, Jason and Alison. However, after an incident where she unintentionally harmed Alison, Charlotte herself was institutionalized at Radley. She received frequent visits from Jessica but was neglected by her adoptive father, Kenneth DiLaurentis, who was angry over Charlotte being transgender. At 12 years old, Charlotte witnessed fellow patient Bethany Young push patient Marion Cavanaugh (mother to Toby Cavanaugh) off the roof of Radley. Bethany blamed Charlotte for the murder and Jessica paid off a young Officer Wilden to make sure the death was ruled a suicide. Charlotte was briefly friends with Lucas Gottesman as a child.

Charlotte eventually underwent gender reassignment surgery and would frequently sneak out of Radley to befriend Alison while using the fake name "CeCe Drake." She also "dated" her adoptive brother, Jason, in an effort to get closer to him and Alison, however she refused any physical interaction due to her knowledge of their true blood relation. Charlotte, acting as Alison's best friend, often taught her to act cruel to others. Drake was friends with Detective Darren Wilden who later began a sexual relationship with Alison, leading Alison to have a pregnancy scare. Charlotte dedicated herself to math as a way to escape reality, which allowed her to attend classes at the University of Pennsylvania.

On Labor Day Weekend, the night of Alison's disappearance, Bethany Young stole Charlotte's clothes and snuck out of Radley to attack Jessica. In an effort to stop her, Charlotte broke out as well and hit Bethany over the head with a rock. However, to her horror, she discovered she accidentally hit Alison and Jessica buried Alison out of panic, believing Alison to be dead.

Charlotte begins visiting Mona Vanderwaal after Mona becomes a patient at Radley, and soon takes over as "A" in Mona's spot.

=== Season 2 ===
Though her face is unseen to the audience, the character makes her first appearance in the season 2 finale "Unmasked" as a stranger wearing a red bathrobe (initially thought to be a red coat) who pays a visit to Mona Vanderwaal following her admission to Radley Sanitarium.

=== Season 3 ===
Charlotte is seen in various A and Red Coat disguises in the third season before making her first official appearance as CeCe Drake in "Crazy". In the episode, Charlotte introduces herself as CeCe Drake, an old friend of Alison's and ex-girlfriend of Jason, to the main characters of the series - Aria Montgomery, Spencer Hastings, Hanna Marin and Emily Fields (who are collectively known as "the Liars.")

During "The Kahn Game", CeCe reveals to Spencer and Aria that she was a student at UPenn and invites them to a frat party. Later, CeCe challenges Eric Kahn to a game of "Truth or Dare". During "Single Fright Female", CeCe begins planning a fashion show. She also recalls to Spencer how she and Alison once pulled a cruel prank on Emily's girlfriend, Paige McCullers.

Drake appears in "Out of the Frying Pan, Into the Inferno" where she answers the Liars' questions about her friendship with Alison and in "What Becomes of the Broken-Hearted" where she hires Aria as a photographer for her boutique. In this same episode, Jason relays a flashback to Emily of the night Alison disappeared. He recalls seeing 'Alison' near his house, but when he called her name, it was CeCe who turned her head around.

During "Hot Water", Detective Darren Wilden temporarily arrests CeCe to question her after finding out she's been talking about Alison's pregnancy scare. This leads CeCe to leave Rosewood.

=== Season 4 ===
After again appearing in various disguises to stalk the Liars, CeCe makes her first official fourth season appearance during "Bring Down the Hoe" where she is seen in an apartment filled with pictures of Alison DiLaurentis and the Liars dating back to Halloween in 2008.

After Darren Wilden is murdered, the Liars suspect CeCe. In "Now You See Me, Now You Don't", CeCe is revealed as Red Coat. CeCe attempts to escape by grabbing onto a rope, only for it to snap. After an accidental fall from a high platform to the ground, CeCe disappears. According to Travis in "Love ShAck, Baby", CeCe was last spotted in Maryland on the run from the authorities.

During the season finale "'A' Is for Answers", CeCe is detained by Detective Gabriel Holbrook and questioned about Wilden's homicide. She confesses to knowing who murdered Bethany Young (the girl buried in Alison's grave) and that Alison is still alive. (Note: Knew Alison DiLaurentis was still alive after her disappearance.)

=== Season 5 ===
In "Escape from New York", CeCe is taken away and knocks a cop unconscious before stealing his car and heading off to New York to ask Alison for a favor. Alison offers her a plane ticket to France and CeCe leaves the country (although we later learn she secretly stayed behind to continue manipulating the Liars as "A.") In "How the 'A' Stole Christmas", CeCe returns to Rosewood to secretly meet with Alison.

=== Season 6 ===
During the first half of the sixth season, Charlotte's history as Charles and "CeCe" is explored before eventually being revealed in "Game Over, Charles" when Charlotte is unmasked as "Big A." She is eventually stopped by the Liars before she can commit suicide and declares the ending to her reign as "A".

In the following episode, "Of Late I Think of Rosewood", it is revealed that Charlotte spent the subsequent five years under medical care at the Welby State Psychiatric Hospital. Despite the Liars' hesitation to testify in favor of Charlotte's release from the hospital, the girls (aside from Aria) ended up lying for Alison and stated that they were no longer traumatized by the events Charlotte put them through. The court approves Charlotte's release and she returns home with Alison. However, she is discovered to have been murdered later that night.

A later episode reveals Charlotte's killer to be Mona Vanderwaal. After discovering Charlotte was not better and still planned on hurting the Liars, the two had gotten in a fight and Charlotte was thrown against a metal staple and thrown off the local church roof.

=== Season 7 ===
The seventh and final season continues to explore the aftermath of Charlotte's murder. Charlotte is seen during flashbacks throughout the season.

A flashback in "Hit and Run, Run, Run" shows Alison and Charlotte feuding the night of Charlotte's murder. Another flashback during "Wanted: Dead or Alive", shows Charlotte enlisting Jenna Marshall's help to track down Mary Drake, Charlotte's birth mother.

The concluding events of the season reveals that Charlotte had a younger sister, Alex Drake, who was the secret identical twin sister of Spencer Hastings (making both Alex and Spencer the younger maternal half-sisters of Charlotte). The two became friends after Alex was found by Wren Kingston, and Alex Drake later took over as "Uber A" to find Charlotte's murderer.

== Reception ==
The character (as CeCe Drake) was initially well received by critics. Riley Sky of Dropkick Divas Media gave a positive review, saying, "as charming and manipulative as Alison DiLaurentis was, we get to see where Ali got those sociopathic qualities in CeCe Drake. CeCe possesses a charm eerily similar to Alison’s. While Ali "may" be dead, CeCe gives us a refreshing look at how Ali's life would have looked. This beyond-charismatic twenty-something blonde stylist that sure does have one heel in the present, one in the past, CeCe leaves us wanting more."

However, the character's later reveal as the transgender Charlotte and second "A" was met with a polarizing reception. Some television critics described it as "harmful", "transphobic", and as "a negative stereotype about trans people." One article stated that "a TV show adding a transgender character would be something to celebrate, since there is not nearly enough trans representation in media" but that the show "got it all wrong." Several other reviewers were also concerned because "the twist played into a long history of pop culture linking sociopathic behavior with transgender individuals."

However, praise was given to Vanessa Ray's performance. Entertainment Weekly's Isabella Biedenharn called her "fantastic" and "compelling." The A.V. Club reviewer LaToya Ferguson wrote that the choice of having CeCe Drake being "A"/Charles was "the best decision" instead of choosing Wren. To her, it could have turned out worse, alluding to the Gossip Girl's reveal. Ferguson applauded Vanessa Ray's emotional performance, "reminding the audience (and characters) why they were drawn to CeCe in the first place." She highlighted how CeCe manages to make her wrongdoings acceptable, almost redeeming herself.

For her portrayal in the show's sixth season, Ray won a Teen Choice Award for Choice TV: Villain.
