= Teen Choice Award for Choice TV Villain =

Entertainment award category

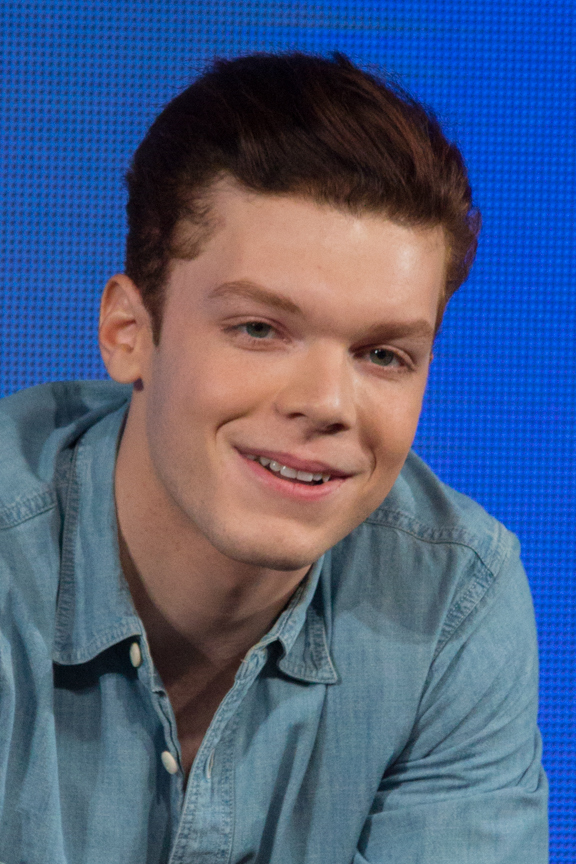
- 2019 Winner Cameron Monaghan
- Country: United States
- First award: 2007
- Final award: 2019
- Currently held by: Cameron Monaghan for Gotham (2019)

Highlights
- Most wins: Janel Parrish (4)
- Most nominations: Janel Parrish (5)
- Website: http://www.teenchoice.com/

The following is a list Teen Choice Award winners and nominees for Choice TV Villain. This award was first given out in 2007.

The all-time winner in this category is Janel Parrish for her role as Mona Vanderwaal in Pretty Little Liars, with four wins. Parrish is also the most nominated, with 5 nominations. She is also the only winner in this category who has won two years in a row, twice (2012-2013, 2016–2017).

The current Choice TV Villain winner is Cameron Monaghan for his roles as Jerome and Jeremiah Valeska in Gotham (2019).

== Winners and nominees ==
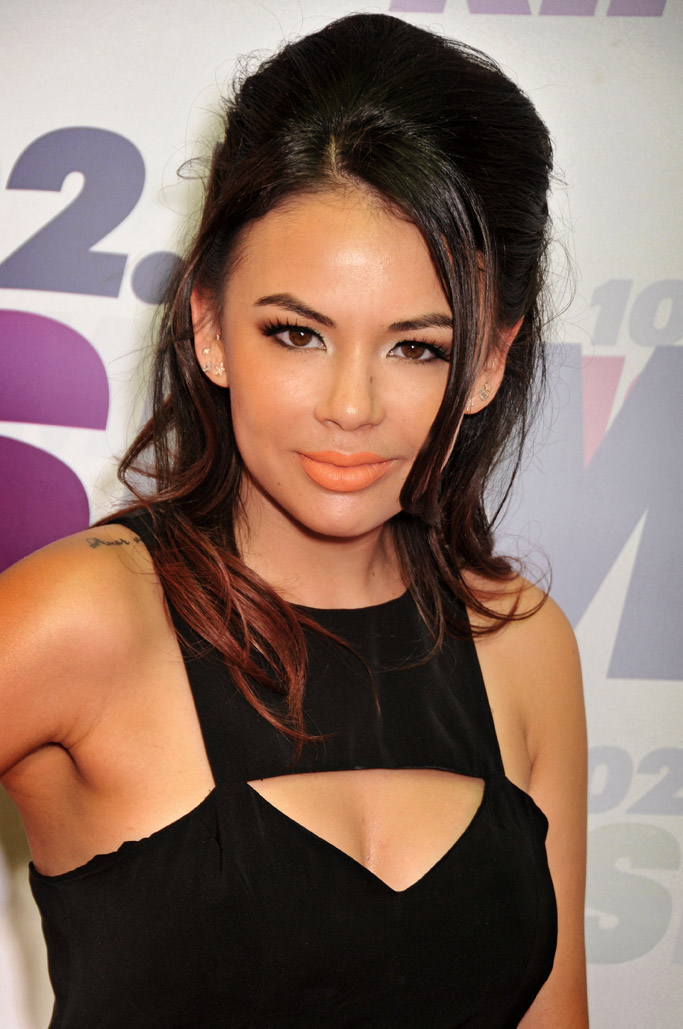
Janel Parrish is the all-time winner in this category with four wins and she is the most nominated act with five nominations, for her portrayal of Mona Vanderwaal in Pretty Little Liars.

=== 2000s ===
Year	Winner	Nominees	Ref.
2007	Vanessa Williams – Ugly Betty	Michael Emerson – Lost; Robert Knepper – Prison Break; Zachary Quinto – Heroes; Michael Rosenbaum – Smallville	
2008	Ed Westwick – Gossip Girl	Spencer Pratt – The Hills; Zachary Quinto – Heroes; Michael Rosenbaum – Smallville; Vanessa Williams – Ugly Betty	
2009	Ed Westwick – Gossip Girl	Spencer Pratt – The Hills; Zachary Quinto – Heroes; Michael Rosenbaum – Smallville; Vanessa Williams – Ugly Betty	

=== 2010s ===
Year	Winner	Nominees	Ref.
2010	Ian Somerhalder – The Vampire Diaries	Russell Hantz – Survivor: Heroes vs Villains; Jane Lynch – Glee; Terry O'Quinn – Lost; Ed Westwick – Gossip Girl	
2011	Justin Bieber – CSI: Crime Scene Investigation	Stewie Griffin – Family Guy; Jane Lynch – Glee; Joseph Morgan – The Vampire Diaries; Ed Westwick – Gossip Girl	
2012	Janel Parrish – Pretty Little Liars	Joseph Morgan – The Vampire Diaries; Lana Parrilla – Once Upon a Time; Krysten Ritter – Don't Trust the B— in Apartment 23; Michelle Trachtenberg – Gossip Girl	
2013	Janel Parrish – Pretty Little Liars	Carly Chaikin – Suburgatory; Joseph Morgan – The Vampire Diaries; Lana Parrilla – Once Upon a Time; Becca Tobin – Glee	
2014	Dylan O'Brien – Teen Wolf	Robbie Kay – Once Upon a Time; Jane Lynch – Glee; Janel Parrish – Pretty Little Liars; Paul Wesley – The Vampire Diaries	
2015	Vanessa Ray – Pretty Little Liars	Tom Cavanagh – The Flash; The Dread Doctors – Teen Wolf; Terrence Howard – Empire; Matt Nable – Arrow; Chris Wood – The Vampire Diaries	
2016	Janel Parrish – Pretty Little Liars	Brett Dalton – Agents of S.H.I.E.L.D.; Greg Germann – Once Upon a Time; Lea Michele – Scream Queens; Cameron Monaghan – Gotham; Teddy Sears – The Flash	
2017	Janel Parrish – Pretty Little Liars	Grant Gustin – The Flash; Teri Hatcher – Supergirl; Mark Pellegrino – Supernatural; Josh Segarra – Arrow; Cory Michael Smith – Gotham	
2018	Mark Consuelos – Riverdale	Odette Annable – Supergirl; Gabrielle Anwar – Once Upon a Time; Anna Hopkins – Shadowhunters; Mind Flayer – Stranger Things; Cameron Monaghan – Gotham	
2019	Cameron Monaghan – Gotham	Luke Baines – Shadowhunters; Sarah Carter – The Flash; Jon Cryer – Supergirl; Adam Scott – The Good Place; Sea Shimooka – Arrow	

== Most wins ==
The following individuals received two or more Choice TV Villain awards:

4 Wins

- Janel Parrish

2 Wins

- Ed Westwick

== Most nominations ==
The following individuals received two or more Choice TV Villain nominations:

5 Nominations

- Janel Parrish

4 Nominations

- Ed Westwick

3 Nominations

- Jane Lynch
- Zachary Quinto
- Cameron Monaghan
- Michael Rosenbaum
- Vanessa Williams

2 Nominations

- Joseph Morgan
- Lana Parrilla
- Spencer Wratt
