= Vanessa Ray =

American actress (born 1981)

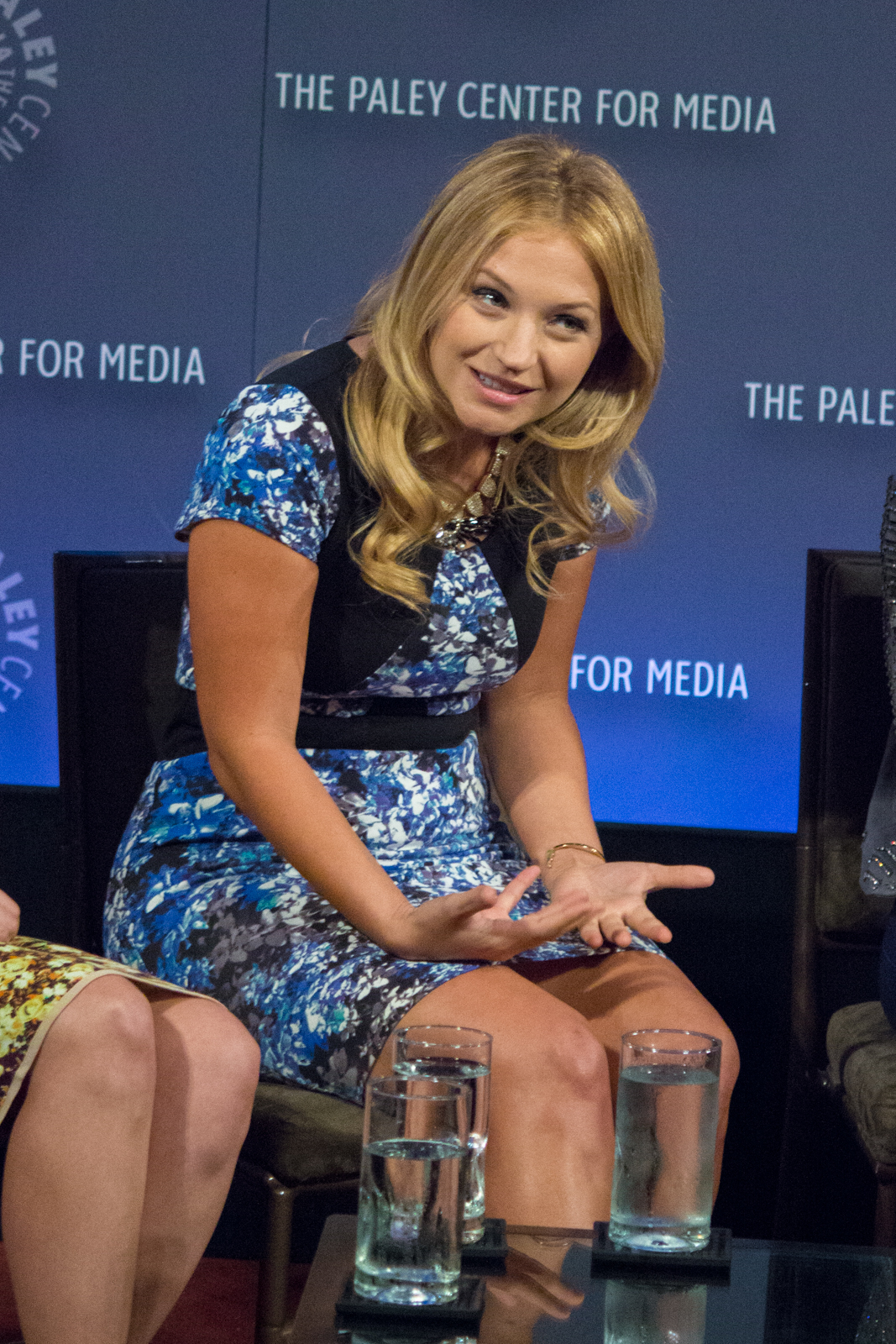
- Ray at the 2014 PaleyFest
- Born: Vanessa Ray Liptak; June 24, 1981 (age 45); Livermore, California, U.S.
- Occupation: Actress
- Years active: 2003–present
- Known for: As the World Turns; Suits; Pretty Little Liars; Blue Bloods
- Spouses: Derek James Baynham (m. 2003; div. 2009) Landon Beard (m. 2015)
- Children: 1

Vanessa Ray Liptak (born June 24, 1981) is an American actress. She started her career portraying Teri Ciccone in the soap opera As the World Turns (2006–2010) before taking on recurring roles in Damages (2010) and Suits (2011–2012). Her breakthrough came with the role of Charlotte Drake in the Freeform thriller drama series Pretty Little Liars (2012–2017), winning a Teen Choice Award. She has since acted in the police drama series Blue Bloods (2013–2024).

== Acting career ==
Ray earned her Actors' Equity Association card while performing the role of Rusty and singing "Let's Hear It for the Boy" in the musical Footloose. She played the role of Nemo in Robert and Kristin Lopez's Finding Nemo: The Musical at Orlando's Disney World. Ray played the character Olive Ostrovsky in the national tour of The 25th Annual Putnam County Spelling Bee. She joined the Broadway cast of Hair in its final year as Crissy, and sang the song "Frank Mills". She made her on-screen debut as Chris in the youth-oriented video short feature The Sparky Chronicles: The Map (2003).

Between 2012 and 2017, Ray appeared as CeCe Drake, a "beyond-charismatic twenty-something blonde stylist at a boutique that has one heel in the present, one in the past", in the television series Pretty Little Liars. Ray was announced to start filming again for PLL, and spoke about returning, saying, "It's so fun to do, and what a crazy character I get to play. She's sort of a sociopath. I think she's so weird because she's, like, 22 but hangs out with high-schoolers. It's like, 'Hey, girl! Get a life!'"

In 2013, Ray joined the Season 4 cast of the CBS police procedural drama Blue Bloods as Officer Edit "Eddie" Janko, a role she continued throughout the show's run until its cancellation in December 2024.

== Personal life ==
Ray now lives and works between Los Angeles and New York City. She married actor Derek James Baynham on January 8, 2003. In 2007, the first season of the HGTV series Marriage Under Construction covered their purchase, renovation and eventual sale of a house in Toronto. The couple divorced in 2009.

In March 2015, Ray announced on Instagram and Twitter that she was engaged to her boyfriend of six years, Landon Beard. On June 14, 2015, they married at the Condor's Nest Ranch in eastern San Diego County, California.

In December 2020, while being interviewed in The Pink Lemonade podcast, Ray revealed she has bipolar disorder. She was first diagnosed while spending three months in a mental health facility.

On March 1, 2024, it was revealed that Ray and her husband welcomed a baby boy via adoption.

== Filmography ==
=== Film ===
Year	Title	Role	Notes
2003	The Sparky Chronicles: The Map	Chris	Video
2004	Is He...	Steph	Short
2010	Nice Guy Johnny	Best Friend	
2011	Trust Me	Girlfriend	Short
2012	Not Waving but Drowning	Adele	
2012	Frances Ha	Random Girl #2	
2012	The Last Day of August	Phoebe	
2013	Mutual Friends	Lucy	
2014	Devil's Due	Suzie	
2014	Are You Joking?	Haley Lusky	
2015	All in Time	Rachel	
2015	The Rumperbutts	Ashlee	
2016	Serialized	Hannah Ryan	TV movie

=== Television ===
Year	Title	Role	Notes
2006–10	As the World Turns	Teri Ciccone	Regular Cast
2008–09	The Battery's Down	Vanessa	Recurring Cast: Season 1, Guest: Season 2
2009	Bored to Death	Claudia	Episode: "The Case of the Missing Screenplay"
2010	Damages	Tessa Marchetti	Recurring Cast: Season 3
2011	White Collar	Maggie 'Rocker' Sheldon	Episode: "What Happens in Burma"
2011	Nurse Jackie	Mrs. Donovan	Episode: "Have You Met Ms. Jones?"
2011–12	Suits	Jenny Griffith	Recurring Cast: Season 1-2
2012	Girls	Heather Travis	Episode: "The Return"
2012	Pretty Dirty Secrets	CeCe Drake	Episode: "A Reunion" and "Call Security"
2012–17	Pretty Little Liars	CeCe Drake	Recurring Cast: Season 3-7
2013	The Mentalist	Cayce Robbins	Episode: "Red Lacquer Nail Polish"
2013–24	Blue Bloods	Officer Edit “Eddie” Janko-Reagan	Recurring Cast: Season 4, Main Cast: Season 5-14

=== Music video ===
Year	Song	Artist
2022	"Bring Back The Time"	New Kids on the Block featuring Salt-N-Pepa, Rick Astley & En Vogue

== Awards and nominations ==
Year	Ceremony	Category	Work	Result	Ref
2015	Teen Choice Awards	Choice TV: Villain	CeCe Drake	Won	
