= Hanna Marin =

Character in Pretty Little Liars book series

- Pretty Little Liars character
- Hanna Marin as portrayed by Ashley Benson on the television series of the same name
- First appearance: Pretty Little Liars (2006)
- Created by: Sara Shepard
- Portrayed by: Ashley Benson
- Voiced by: Cassandra Morris (Pretty Little Liars–Wanted); Katie Schorr (The Liars)
- Adapted by: I. Marlene King

In-universe information
- Full name: Hanna Olivia Marin-Rivers (television)
- Nicknames: Hefty Hanna; Hanna Banana; Hannakins
- Gender: Female
- Title: Homecoming Queen 2010
- Occupation: Fashion designer; Clinic Assistant; Assistant to Claudia Greco
- Family: Ashley Marin (mother); Tom Marin (father); Regina Marin (paternal grandmother); Isabel Marin (step-mother); Kate Randall (step-sister)
- Spouses: Caleb Rivers (television); Mike Montgomery (novels)
- Significant others: Televisions: Sean Ackard (ex-boyfriend); Travis Hobbs (ex-boyfriend); Jordan Hobart (ex-fiancé); Mike Montgomery (fling) Novels Sean Ackard (ex-boyfriend) Lucas (ex-boyfriend) Liam (ex-boyfriend)
- Children: Aidan Rivers (television)
- Relatives: Regina Marin (paternal grandmother); Patrick Marin (paternal uncle); Jamie Doyle (father-in-law); Claudia Dawson (mother-in-law)
- Religion: Judaism (novels)
- Residence: Rosewood, Pennsylvania; Manhattan, New York
- Education: Rosewood High School (formerly; graduated); Fashion Institute of Technology (formerly; graduated)

Hanna Olivia Marin is a fictional character created by Sara Shepard for the Pretty Little Liars book series, and later developed for the Freeform television series adaptation by I. Marlene King. The character has also appeared in the spin-off series Ravenswood.

One of the main leads of the franchise, Hanna is a formerly overweight girl who becomes a queen-bee after the disappearance of Alison DiLaurentis.

Hanna is portrayed by Ashley Benson in the television series.

== Character in print ==
Hanna is introduced in the first book as a popular and ruthless girl. She is described as an alluring young brunette who occasionally fights with herself to keep her beauty. In early novels, the character is also written as bulimic.

=== Story line ===
Hanna is one of four primary protagonists in all sixteen Pretty Little Liars novels, starting with Pretty Little Liars. All four girls attend the same school.

==== Prior to the start ====
Before Alison DiLaurentis disappears, Hanna is shown as a shy girl with an eating disorder. She is best friends with Alison DiLaurentis along with Spencer Hastings, Aria Montgomery and Emily Fields. Like the other girls, Hanna and Alison had a secret between them: Alison witnessed Hanna purging with a toothbrush when she thought she was overweight. During the last night of the 7th grade, while having a sleepover in Spencer's sister Melissa's barn, Alison disappeared.

Years later, in the 9th grade, Hanna tried out for cheerleading but didn't make it, since the cheerleaders considered her too fat and not pretty enough to be in the squad. Hanna and Mona Vanderwaal, a girl that Hanna and her friends used to make fun of for being dorky, decided to become skinny and pretty before next year's cheerleading tryouts. They bonded and became pretty and popular, eventually deciding that cheerleading wasn't even cool enough to try out for. Hanna took over Alison's spot as the most popular girl after Alison's disappearance. Within that time, Hanna and Mona also became shoplifters.

== Character on screen ==
=== Casting ===
In December 2009, The Futon Critic confirmed the casting of Ashley Benson as Hanna Marin.

=== Relationships ===
==== Sean Ackard ====
Hanna's relationship with Sean started before the first episode. She thought he was the love of her life after she became a popular girl, and he noticed her. She has to struggle with Sean's decision to not have sex yet, and she doubts if he likes her. Their relationship ends later, during a party where she passes the limits with him and he gets upset.

==== Caleb Rivers ====
Hanna's first hook-up with the bad boy Caleb Rivers is in the first season when they develop feelings for each other, and he takes Hanna's virginity. This first hook-up ended when Hanna discovered that Caleb was spying on her, and Jenna paid him to do it. However, in the second season, Hanna forgives him and they rekindle their relationship. In the third season, after “A” was revealed to be Mona, Hanna started visiting her in Radley Sanitarium, and a new stalker emerged, making Hanna lie to Caleb multiple times. Thus, Caleb broke up with her, saying he was tired of all her lies. But, when Hanna tells Caleb the truth behind the new “A,” he forgives her. The relationship continues well during the rest of the third season, until the following season when Hanna gets upset because Caleb had to leave Rosewood to find out what was going on in Ravenswood. Furthermore, when Caleb returns to Rosewood, they hook up once again. They broke up again sometime during the five-year jump that occurred in mid sixth-season finale. It is later revealed that they broke up because Hanna was working a lot, and they didn't spend much time together. However, they kissed when Hanna was set as a trap for the new stalker. Later they got back together. All through everything, Hanna is still in love with Caleb.

==== Travis Hobbs ====
Hanna's first contact with Travis occurred when he went to the police department and testified that Hanna's mother didn't kill Darren Wilden; with the act, Hanna thanked him. Later, Hanna texts Travis asking for his help. He drives her and her friends home, and later he helps Hanna to clean up, and she thanks him for everything. Hanna offers to pay him, but instead, he holds her hand and the two share an intimate moment. Later, Hanna invites Travis over to play a pool game. He teaches her how to play and, later, they kiss. Travis then invites Hanna on a date, and, during the dinner, they talk and enjoy a lot, until Hanna gets a text from “A” and after telling him she had a great time, leaves an upset Travis. They started dating later. However, when Alison returns to Rosewood, Hanna becomes insecure, and she forgets that she has plans to go to the Grille with Travis. He surprises her by knocking on her door, and she apologizes for forgetting and tells him that Alison is inside her home. She alleges that she would call him after Alison leaves, but she didn't do it, upsetting Travis, who broke up with Hanna the next morning.

==== Jordan Hobart ====
Jordan was Hanna's fiancée after the five-year time jump—which occurred during the mid-sixth season. He is described as a sophisticated yet approachable 27-year-old working in the fashion industry. Hanna and him first meet at a restaurant in New York, where Jordan asks him to buy her a drink. However, Hanna calls off her engagement with Jordan in the seventh season, when she finds herself unable to love him the way she wishes she could, hiding the breakup from her friends for a while by wearing a fake diamond ring when she returns to Rosewood.

=== Rivalries and friendships ===
Hanna has a brief jealousy of Amber Victorino, a girl who gave Sean rides to school after Hanna crashed Sean's car. In the fourth season, Hanna had a slight rivalry with Miranda, a girl whom Caleb wanted to help when he decided to move to Ravenswood. Hanna also has an ongoing rivalry with her step-sister Kate Randall, that begins in season 1.

Hanna also had a rivalry with Jenna Marshall due to Alison being at fault for the incident that blinded Jenna. Jenna harbored resentment for all of the liars. Jenna and Hanna's rivalry is a reoccurring topic in the show.

Hanna's closest friendships are with Spencer Hastings, Aria Montgomery, Alison DiLaurentis, Emily Fields, and Mona Vanderwaal (The Liars). She is also casual friends with Lucas Gottesman and Wren Kingston.

=== Story lines ===
==== Season 1 ====
The formerly overweight "Hefty Hanna" is now the "it girl" of Rosewood High School. Along with her new best friend, Mona Vanderwaal, she rules the school, and they are clearly labelled "queen bees". She is dating a popular guy and pastor's son, Sean Ackard. Shoplifting with Mona makes her seem like a troublemaker, but when she is caught, her mother realizes that Hanna is only doing this to get her father's attention in the wake of his moving out. When she is caught by the police, Hanna struggles with the fact that her mother, Ashley Marin, is the main reason her charges were dropped. Ashley maintained a sexual relationship with Officer Darren Wilden in order to keep Hanna out of trouble and to keep up appearances. The old group of friends, of which Hanna was a member in ninth grade, reunites, causing tension between her and Mona. Hanna also has to deal with the threats and the danger of possibly having her secrets revealed by the tenebrous "A." Hanna navigates heartbreak, hurt, a broken leg (courtesy of "A"), and more. Toward the end of the season, Hanna starts a romantic relationship with the misunderstood "bad boy" Caleb Rivers, who seems to be the first person to truly understand her.

==== Season 2 ====
After suffering with Caleb's betrayal, Hanna now has to decide if she'll be able to forgive him, or just let him go. Meanwhile, Hanna has to struggle with the marriage between her father, Tom, and her soon-to-be step-mother, Isabel. Her friendships with Aria, Emily and Spencer grow — angering Mona, who thinks that maybe she has lost her friendship with Hanna. Hanna ultimately forgives Caleb, and they reunite. To find out who is “A,” the girls ask Caleb for help, and Hanna worries about it. The season ends with Hanna finding out that Mona is the person behind the anonymous “A.”

==== Season 3 ====
Hanna is trying to overcome Mona's betrayal, and she decides to visit her at the Radley Sanitarium to get some answers. Hanna's relationship with Caleb keeps going until they break up when Caleb gets tired of Hanna's lies—principally when she covers up her visits to Mona. Plus, Hanna gets closer to Wren Kingston, but she avoids a possible relationship. Hanna is also accused of stealing Alison's body by Officer Wilden. Caleb and Hanna hook up once again when he finds out that a new "A" emerged recently.

==== Season 4 ====
After the events of the third-season finale, Hanna and the girls now have Mona on their side. Meanwhile, Hanna starts to suspect that her mother may have killed Officer Wilden. On Halloween, the girls connect in Ravenswood, a town next to Rosewood. Hanna and Caleb's relationship ends when Hanna decides that Caleb should know what's behind his past in Ravenswood. Hanna's relationship with the girls is growing stronger and stronger with each tragedy. In the season finale, Hanna and the girls find out that Alison is still alive.

==== Season 5 ====
With Alison's return to Rosewood, Hanna struggles with her identity and individuality. Determined to be her own person, Hanna gets a makeover. Her insecurities are not helped when Caleb returns to Rosewood, with secrets of his own, and the pair begin drinking. Hanna's drinking causes a rift between her and her friends, especially Aria, when Ella's—Aria's mother— fiancée hits on her. When Caleb finally opens up to Hanna, things between them get back to normal. Hanna is deeply affected by Mona's apparent death. Being accepted into her choice of college, Hanna scrambles to collect enough money when her father refuses to pay for her education. Desperate, and at a loss of other options, Hanna enrolls in a beauty pageant for the cash prize, only to fail miserably. Hanna also deals with her mother's infidelity, while trying to foil "A'"s attempts to frame her for Mona's murder. "A" finally succeeds in putting Hanna behind bars as an accomplice to Mona's murder. She, along with the other girls, are being transported to prison when they are abducted and held captive by "A" in a species of house for hostages.

==== Season 6 ====
Following the events in which 'A' kidnapped Hanna and her friends on their way to the prison and imprisoned them in the Dollhouse, Hanna shows symptoms of post-traumatic stress disorder, and she relieves herself through anger. After a collapse, she destroys her bedroom and temporarily breaks up with Caleb; plus, she does not want to be overly protected anymore and decides to find out once and for all who "A" really is. She starts investigating with Spencer and gets a list of suspects. However, none of her suspects is the real one. The second person behind the "A'" mask is revealed to be CeCe Drake. Afterwards, she graduates and moves to New York City with Caleb, who pays her fee for the NY Fashion Institute of Technology. Hanna embarks into a life that focuses on fashion shows, in which Caleb doesn't seem to fit. These fights drive them apart, and they break up once again. Years later, Hanna, along with her friends, returns to Rosewood. She is now engaged to Jordan and Caleb is dating Spencer, thus making Hanna uncertain and confused, since she still has feelings for her former boyfriend. With her wedding plans moving forward, she questions again if her fiancé is the right decision. As a new stalker is starting to get more dangerous, she and Caleb come up with a trap in which Hanna represents the bait. Knowing the risks, she admits her true feelings for Caleb, and they kiss. The plan goes awry, and Hanna is abducted by the mysterious "A.D." The season ends with Hanna being unconsciously dragged to the church, her state being left unknown.

==== Season 7 ====
Hanna is tortured by AD for a while, but she is able to escape and is brought home with the help of Mary Drake. Hanna tries to make her relationship with Jordan work, but ultimately realizes she can't love Jordan the way she wants to and ends her engagement with him. Hanna doesn't tell the others about her break-up and wears a fake diamond ring. In "Exes and OMG" Hanna becomes convinced that Noel Kahn is "A.D.", when the others don't believe her, she goes rogue and kidnaps Noel and tries to get him to confess to being A.D. after realizing Noel isn't A.D. she lets him go. Later she and Caleb realize they're partners for life and get back together. In "Choose or Loose" Hanna and Caleb get married. In one of the final moments of the series finale, Hanna tells the girls she is pregnant with Caleb's child.

==== Pretty Little Liars: The Perfectionists ====
It was revealed after the 3rd episode that Hanna and Caleb had a baby boy named Aidan.

==== Pretty Little Liars (2022) ====
In the second season episode "Chapter Fifteen: Friday the 13th", Tabby Haworthe and Imogen Adams break into Dr. Sullivan's office and go through the private practice files, finding some on Aria Montgomery, Hanna, Spencer Hastings, and Emily Fields.
