= Mona Vanderwaal =

- Pretty Little Liars character
- Janel Parrish as Mona Vanderwaal
- First appearance: Pretty Little Liars (2006)
- Created by: Sara Shepard
- Portrayed by: Janel Parrish
- Voiced by: Cassandra Morris (Pretty Little Liars–Wanted)
- Adapted by: I. Marlene King

In-universe information
- Aliases: "A"; Ali Dee; Mina Davis "A.D."; Alison DiLaurentis (Note: in the dollhouse.)
- Nicknames: Loser Mona; Crazy Mona; Nutjob Mona; Original A Mona 2.0 mad house mona
- Gender: Female
- Occupation: "A"; Lobbyist (formerly); Game Designer at HT French Doll Shop Owner (formerly); Head of recruitment and admissions at Beacon Heights University (currently)
- Family: Leona Vanderwaal (mother); Mr. Vanderwaal (father)
- Significant others: Television; Noel Kahn (ex-boyfriend; deceased); Mike Montgomery (ex-boyfriend); Unnamed French man (boyfriend); Mason Gregory (ex-boyfriend)
- Relatives: Television; Ned (uncle)
- Education: Rosewood High School (formerly; graduated); Duke University (formerly; graduated)
- Residence: Rosewood, Pennsylvania (formerly); Paris, France (formerly); Beacon Heights, Oregon (currently)
- Status: Television; Alive; Novels; Deceased
- Seasons: 1–7 (PLL); 1 (PLL: TP)

Mona Vanderwaal is a fictional character in the Pretty Little Liars book series, its television adaptation, and the spin-off TV series Pretty Little Liars: The Perfectionists. In the TV shows, she is portrayed by Janel Parrish.

Introduced in Pretty Little Liars as Hanna Marin's best friend, Mona initially harbors a grudge against the protagonists, using her intelligence and resources to torment them anonymously as "A". In the third season of the TV series, Mona gains a partner who eventually takes control from her. Afterward, she forms an unstable alliance with the protagonists, becoming a victim of her own creation. Considered the most knowledgeable character in the series, Mona is versed in computer hacking, foreign languages, singing, empathy, and manipulation. Though introduced as a villainess, she eventually takes steps toward redemption. Mona is the first 'A' in the show and the book.

Initially a supporting player, the TV character gained much popularity among viewers and critics, drawing recognition from Entertainment Weekly, CNN, MTV, and others, prompting producers to expand her role. In March 2015, PrettyLittleLiars.com named Mona the greatest Pretty Little Liars character. MTV also named her one of the best characters on television in 2014. During the TV series' run, producer I. Marlene King acknowledged Mona as a "beloved character." By the end of the show's run, Dana Getz of Bustle.com declared that Mona had become "the most important character in the series."

== Novel series ==
Mona Vanderwaal was introduced in the first four Pretty Little Liars novels. A teenage resident of Rosewood, Pennsylvania, she has ice-blonde hair, blue eyes, and a few freckles. She is a formerly unpopular girl who was teased by Alison DiLaurentis and her friends, longing to be in their group. After Alison went missing, Mona befriended Alison's friend Hanna Marin, and they reinvented themselves as the 'it' girls of Rosewood Day.

=== Pretty Little Liars ===
Mona is introduced as Hanna Marin's best friend. She was initially considered nerdy, but together with Hanna she transformed into a beautiful 'it' girl during the summer three years prior. She is invited to Noel Kahn's beginning of the semester party, where she kisses his older brother, Eric. Whenever the school's mean girls, Naomi and Riley, say something mean about Hanna, Mona is there for her. Mona and Hanna get into numerous fights and arguments about Hanna's old friends, Emily, Aria and Spencer, because Mona thinks that she has been spending more time with them than with her.

=== Flawless and Perfect ===
As Mona's birthday is coming up, she chooses Naomi, Riley, Hanna and some other girls to be her "next-in-lines" so she goes to buy dresses with them. She chooses champagne-colored dresses, but gets in a fight with Hanna, whom she accuses of sabotaging her birthday party. Later on, Hanna gets a package with the champagne-colored dress, and thinks it was Mona who sent it.

Happily, she puts it on and goes to Mona's party, even though the dress is too small. As she comes to the party, Naomi and Riley (who are in emerald dresses) give her weird looks, and when Mona comes out wearing the champagne-colored dress, Hanna realizes that "A" was the one who sent her the dress. Crying, she falls down and her dress rips, following the laughter of the party attendants, including Mona. Hanna tells Mona that she knows she got a liposuction because "A" sent her a message with the content, but Mona says that she should not believe everything she hears and calls her a liar. Later, Hanna gets a message from "A", but sees that it is not the usual blocked number. Even though she got a new phone and did not put in the phone-book yet, she recognizes the number and rushes to tell the girls, but gets hit by a car before she can do anything.

=== Unbelievable ===
After Hanna's car accident, Mona is there for her in the hospital every day, crying. When Hanna wakes up, Mona apologizes, making them friends again. Hanna cannot remember anything that happened at Mona's party, including the "who is A" part. Later, Mona gets in a fight with Lucas regarding a secret that she will not explain to Hanna. She gets a text message and tells Hanna that it is from a person named "A". Hanna has been getting the texts too and admits everything to Mona. Mona seems relieved and tells the other girls about it, too. As Spencer and Mona are on their way to the police station, Hanna remembers that "A" is Mona. The girls send a text message to Spencer, who tries to hide it, but Mona sees it and explains everything – how she discovered Alison's diary and found out all about her secret, and how she read that Alison was going to give Ian an ultimatum – either her or Melissa, bringing Mona to tell Spencer that Ian killed Alison. Mona tries to force Spencer to join her, but they get into a fight and Spencer pushes Mona to the Floating Man's Quarry, causing Mona to fall to her death. After that, Hanna is shaken up, is relieved to know who "A" is and who Alison's killer is. Mona is reported about in the news, and the residents of Rosewood find out about "A" and the Rosewood Stalker, who was also Mona. Hanna finds Mona's "A phone" and later deletes all the messages from Mona/"A" before handing it over to the police, protecting Mona because they were still best friends.

Mona came to be "A" when she found Alison's diary when the St. Germain's moved into the DiLaurentis' old house and threw away Alison's old possessions. It is unclear if she knew about the twins or not when she was "A".

== Television series ==
=== Casting ===
In 2009, Pretty Little Liars was adapted into a television series. Janel Parrish initially auditioned for the role of Spencer Hastings, which went to Troian Bellisario. The Hollywood Reporter later revealed that Parrish had won the role of Mona Vanderwaal. In March 2012, she was promoted from recurring to series regular for the third season. In a 2014 interview, Parrish noted her fondness for the role she'd received, stating, "I'm in love with my character and in love with the show."

=== Characterization ===
"I'm constantly playing Mona like she knows something that other people don't know."

— Parrish on her portrayal

Mona is introduced as an alluring and witty teenager, whose full intelligence is gradually revealed as the series progresses. It is eventually discovered that she can speak French, hack computers, sing, and do voice impressions. Her high IQ is further established in the Season 3 episode "Mona-Mania", when she competes against rival Spencer Hastings in a high-school quiz game, and ultimately wins.

Mona was initially an unpopular girl in Rosewood who longed to be accepted into Alison DiLaurentis's clique and was continuously mocked by Alison. In the Season 2 finale, Alison's friends learn that Mona has used her talents to manipulate and torment them anonymously. It is also discovered that she has dissociative identity disorder, according to her doctor.

== Television storylines ==
=== Season 1 ===
After Alison's disappearance, Mona befriended Hanna and together they underwent an "extreme makeover". During the process they became best friends, as well as two of the most popular students. With her newfound popularity, Mona behaves similarly to Alison, constantly bullying Lucas Gottesman in the same sense Alison did and even telling Hanna that she will cut ties with her before she lets her drag her back down to the bottom. In the mid-season finale, Mona invites the Liars to her birthday party, but uninvites Hanna after "A" sends her a fake message. Hanna and Mona become enemies after this, until Mona begins feeling remorse after Hanna is hit by "A" in a car at the party. They rekindle their friendship but it gradually falls apart again when Mona attempts to break up Hanna's relationship with Caleb.

=== Season 2 ===
Mona's revelation as an antagonist received positive to mixed reviews from critics.

She becomes romantically involved with Noel Kahn, much to Hanna's disapproval, but is later dumped by him for Jenna Marshall. She and Hanna eventually become best friends again and Mona tries to become accepting of Caleb. When "A" begins sending threatening notes to Mona, she grows closer to the Liars and becomes a part of their group. In "Unmasked", Mona is still helping the Liars, who haven't fully accepted her yet, and volunteers to drive Spencer out to the Lost Woods Resort where they find "A's" lair. Here, it is revealed that "A" is actually Mona herself, who claims that she became "A" because of the Liars taking Hanna away from her and never doing anything to prevent Alison's bullying. She and Spencer get into a fight near a cliff and Mona is accidentally pushed off. She survives, however, and is committed to the Radley Sanitarium, after being diagnosed with dissociative identity disorder. Here, she is approached by someone, who wants to start a partnership and form an "A" Team.

Parrish, who had learned of "A's" identity in the novels, revealed she was pleased that the situation had not been changed in the TV series.

=== Season 3 ===
Mona joins forces with a girl known as Red Coat and begins recruiting people for the "A" Team, including Toby Cavanaugh and Lucas Gottesman, while still staying at Radley. At Radley, Mona secretly gives answers to Hanna concerning Maya's death. Possibly unbeknownst to Big "A", she secretly gives Maya's website to Hanna in code, leading the Liars to eventually discover that Nate killed Maya. She is eventually released from Radley and returns to Rosewood High. She also recruits Spencer Hastings to join the team. In the finale, Mona reveals that she doesn't know the identity of Red Coat. She divulges to the Liars that Red Coat approached her in Radley and gave her a way in and out of Radley. Mona claims that the two of them were initially partners, and Mona considered it fun playing the game with someone else, but Red Coat eventually stole the Liars from her and took over. Mona later gets kicked off the "A" Team, becoming a victim of the monster she created and reluctantly joining the Liars.

=== Season 4 ===
Mona is still allied with Liars until she begins helping Ezra Fitz with his book, because he blackmailed to expose her illegal "A" activities. She also begins dating Mike Montgomery, so that she may get closer to Aria, but actually falls for him during the process. In the finale, Alison reveals that Mona helped her the night she went missing and convinced her to go into hiding, giving Mona what she always wanted: Alison gone.

=== Season 5 ===
Upon finding out that Alison is returning, Mona starts an army of Alison haters to prepare for her return. The team consists of Lucas, Melissa, Jenna, Sydney, and others treated badly by Alison. In the mid-season finale, she is supposedly killed by "A" after acquiring information that proves Alison is the alleged anonymous tormentor. In the second half of the season, it is revealed that Mona never believed Alison was "A" and that she faked her death as part of "A's" plan to get Alison into jail, so that she could find out their true identity. She now has blonde hair and is locked inside "A's" dollhouse, being forced to pretend to be Alison.

=== Season 6 ===
In "Game On, Charles," Mona is locked outside of the dollhouse along with the other Liars as a punishment for trying to escape. They are eventually let back in the dollhouse but Mona is taken away by "A" and taken to the hole, while the other girls experience their own personal torture. Alison, Ezra and Caleb unite in a plan which leads to rescue. Mona's mother takes her away from Rosewood to recuperate from the trauma of the experience.

Mona returns to Rosewood in "She's No Angel" and is nervous of what Alison will do to her after learning that she staged her death and framed her for it. She arrives at Hanna's house and they decide to go to the police station to report her return. They stop off at the Grill on the way and encounter Leslie. Leslie is not happy that Mona mentioned her name in her fake death and threatens both Hanna and Mona if her name is mentioned to do with Mona ever again. Later in the episode Spencer sees Mona posting a card into Alison's letterbox. Spencer asks Mona if she was in a room that appeared in Spencer's dream of the dollhouse. Mona says that it must exist in her head. The girls sneak into Radley to see if there is any evidence of Charles Dilaurentis. While there, they encounter Mona who is stealing Leslie's file. Mona tells the other girls that she met Leslie in Radley. This enforces the girls theory that Leslie is "A". At the end of the episode Mona is seen on the phone to Leslie saying that she failed to keep her time in Radley a secret. Leslie said that Mona is useless and messes everything up like usual.

Mona appears at the ending of "No Stone Unturned". The Liars are investigating around Leslie's animal lab to see what she is hiding when suddenly the lights go out and Mona emerges. The girls ask why Mona is following them again and she explains that she is trying to stop the lab from suing them. Spencer shows Mona the records that Charles is dead and was a liver donor. Mona says that it is impossible that Charles was a liver donor because he would not have been an eligible donor with all the medication he was on. The security guard comes by the door and the girls turn off the light and Mona also hides.

In "Oh Brother, Where Art Thou," Mona and the Liars go to Mona's bedroom expecting to meet Leslie. Leslie texts Mona to tell her that she will not be coming to meet them as confrontations could set her recovery back. Aria thinks that they should drive over to Leslie's house because she knows more about Charles than she is letting on. Mona says that if Leslie knew more about Charles then she would have told her. Later in the episode Mona and Mike reconcile with each other, but she thinks that he should stay away from her because she deserved to be in the dollhouse. Mike ends this by kissing Mona passionately. Alison gets a lift from Mona. Alison says that Mona was the only one that picked up the phone to her. Alison calls the police and confesses that Charles Dilaurentis is "A" and her brother. Mona says she shouldn't have done that.

In "Game Over, Charles," it is revealed that CeCe Drake is Big "A". She joined forces with Mona to get in and out of Radley and took on the Red Coat disguise as well. She also hired Sara Harvey to act as Red Coat whenever she needed her to be, and Sara was the person who was communicating with Mona the night of the Lodge fire. It is also revealed that Mona is the person who hit Bethany Young with a shovel, believing her to be Alison.

Five years later, Mona returns to Rosewood to testify CeCe's release from a mental hospital. She later decides that CeCe should be released from the hospital. Mona reconnects with Hanna and gets into a fashion business with her.

=== Season 7 ===
In the final season, Mona teams up with the others against the new "A", known as "A.D.". Mona helps them figure out that Aria is on the "A.D." Team. However, Mona is revealed to be Charlotte Drake's killer. She and Charlotte/CeCe got into a fight in the Bell Tower, after Mona threatened her. Mona accidentally pushed Charlotte into a sharp piece of metal on the wall, killing her. During the series finale, "A.D." sends Wren in her place to kill Mona, but Mona offers to join the "A.D." Team instead and works with Uber "A" against the girls, wearing a Melissa mask and delivering Spencer to them. However, she figures out that Spencer's twin, Alex Drake, is "A.D." and hatches a plan. She helps the Liars thwart Alex's plans and brings a police officer to arrest her and Mary. However, the "officer" is actually Mona's French boyfriend and Mona and her new boyfriend have brought Mary and Alex to France to live in her own personal Dollhouse, underneath the doll shop she owns, thus revealing that Mona has won the "A" game and is the final and ultimate "A". Appearing in the penultimate segment, she is the last of the longtime characters to be seen in the series, surpassing even the Liars, prior to an epilogue.

== Reception ==
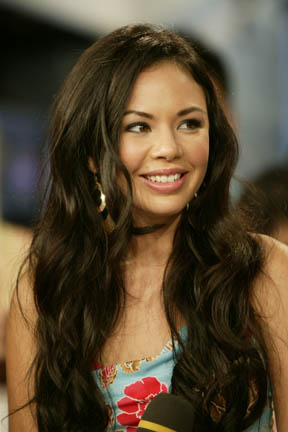
Janel Parrish's portrayal of Mona has received universal acclaim from critics and fans alike.

The show's breakout player, Mona Vanderwaal was named the greatest character in the TV series by PrettyLittleLiars.com, which cited her cleverness, multiple layers, and chemistry with Spencer Hastings and Hanna Marin. MTV named Mona one of the best characters on television in 2014, labeling her "smart, ferocious, and consistently interesting." In reviews for Bustle.com, Kaitlin Reilly called Mona "complicated, brilliant, and perpetually paradoxical", while Caitlin Flynn stated, "No one keeps viewers guessing quite as much as Mona." In a related review, Dana Getz declared that Mona "quietly became the most important character in the series."

Bustle also noted Mona's character development, declaring that she had "redeemed herself in the later seasons of the show". Similarly, Heather Hogan of AutoStraddle.com identified Mona as central to the show's theme of redemption, labeling the character "practically perfect in every way" and recognizing her as "the best and most beloved character on Pretty Little Liars." I. Marlene King, a producer of the TV series, acknowledged Mona as "a beloved character" during the series' run, prompting producers to expand Mona's role beyond her arc in the novels.

Mona's revelation as "A" in the episode "UnmAsked" received much media attention. Zach Johnson of Us Weekly called the development "shocking" and "intense." Bustle.com's Kaitlin Reilly labeled the scene "amazing." Stephanie Goldberg of CNN was less positive, finding the revelation "obvious" while also citing a lack of change from the book series. Seventeen magazine's Michelle King noted that the episode sent "chills up our spine," and reviewed it favorably.

At the conclusion of the TV series, an article from Hypable.com lauded Mona's impact on the show, calling her "Brilliant, hilarious, brave, and beautiful," also labeling the character "always fun to watch". In a review of the series finale, Louise McCreesh of Digital Spy called Mona the show's "one true hero", citing her role in bringing down the final antagonist. Janel Parrish felt that her character got a perfect ending. Writers for numerous media outlets, including Entertainment Weekly, Hypable.com, BuddyTV, and Bustle.com, called for a spin-off focusing on Mona Vanderwaal.

Jessica Goldstein of Vulture highlighted Mona's fashion choices while also praising her relationship with Mike Montgomery, saying, "I like her little Breakfast at Tiffany's look, her winged eyeliner, and even her overdone updo, because such devotion to hairspray seems very Mona-esque to me."

=== Accolades ===
Ceremony	Year	Category	Outcome	Ref.
Teen Choice Awards	2012	Choice TV Villain	Won	
TV Guide Awards	2013	Favorite Villain	Nominated	
Teen Choice Awards	2013	Choice TV Villain	Won	
Teen Choice Awards	2014	Choice TV Villain	Nominated	
Teen Choice Awards	2016	Choice TV Villain	Won	
Teen Choice Awards	2017	Choice TV Villain	Won	
