= I. Marlene King =

Writer, producer and director

- Born: Ina Marlene King
- Occupations: Screenwriter; Director; Executive producer
- Years active: 1995–present
- Notable work: Pretty Little Liars
- Spouse: Shari Rosenthal (wife)
- Children: 2 (boys)

Ina Marlene King is a writer, producer and director. She is best known as the executive producer and showrunner of the Freeform teen drama series Pretty Little Liars, based on the book series of the same name by Sara Shepard.

== Personal life ==
King has two sons. She grew up in Winchester, Indiana, and Greenville, Ohio.

== Filmography ==
Year	Title	Credited as				Network	Notes
Year	Title	Writer	Producer	Creator/Developer	Showrunner	Network	Notes
1996	If These Walls Could Talk	Yes	No	No	No	HBO	Television film
1999	Saving Graces	Yes	No	No	No	—N/a	Unsold pilot
2010–2017	Pretty Little Liars	Yes	Executive	Yes	Yes	ABC Family/Freeform	Also director (episode: "Till Death Do Us Part")
2012	Pretty Dirty Secrets	No	Executive	No	No	ABC Family.com	Web series
2013–2014	Ravenswood	Yes	Executive	Yes	Yes	ABC Family	Co-Showrunner
2015	Tatlı Küçük Yalancılar (Sweet Little Liars)	Yes	No	No	No	Star TV	Turkish-language remake of Pretty Little Liars, based on the series' first-season episodes, Written by (season 1)
2017–2018	Famous in Love	Yes	Executive	Yes	Yes	Freeform	Co-Showrunner
2017	The Heiresses	Yes	Executive	Yes	Yes	ABC	Unsold pilot
2019	Pretty Little Liars: The Perfectionists	Yes	Executive	Yes	Yes	Freeform	—N/a
2020–2022	Pretty Little Liars	Yes	No	Yes	No	Viu	Indonesian-language remake of Pretty Little Liars, based on the series' first- and second-season episodes, Written by (seasons 1–2)
2022–2024	Pretty Little Liars	No	Executive	No	No	HBO Max/Max	A spin-off of the 2010 series; (credited as Marlene King)

=== Films ===
Year	Title	Credited as	
Year	Title	Writer	Producer
1995	Now and Then	Yes	Associate
1995	National Lampoon's Senior Trip	Yes	No
2006	Just My Luck	Yes	No

=== Acting ===
Year	Title	Role	Notes
2017	Pretty Little Liars	Wedding photographer	Cameo; episode: "Till Death Do Us Part"
