= Pretty Little Liars season 5 =

Pretty Little Liars
- Season 5
- Season 5 DVD cover
- Starring: Troian Bellisario; Ashley Benson; Tyler Blackburn; Lucy Hale; Ian Harding; Laura Leighton; Shay Mitchell; Janel Parrish; Sasha Pieterse
- No. of episodes: 25

Release
- Original network: ABC Family
- Original release: June 10, 2014 – March 24, 2015

Season chronology
- ← Previous; Season 4 Next → Season 6

The fifth season of the American mystery drama television series Pretty Little Liars began airing on ABC Family on June 10, 2014. Shooting for the season began on March 24, 2014, and ended on November 20, 2014. The season aired from June 10, 2014, to March 24, 2015.

Like the second season, the season consisted of 25 episodes, including a special holiday-themed episode, instead of a Halloween episode which was written by I. Marlene King and her assistant Kyle Bown and was directed by King. It also contained the 100th episode and the episode was written by showrunner I. Marlene King. The promotional poster was released on May 28, 2014. A second promotional poster was released after the hundredth episode was aired, on July 9, 2014. A third promotional poster was released on January 5, 2015, as a promotion for the second half of the fifth season, which began the day after the release of the poster.

It was announced on June 10, 2014, that Pretty Little Liars was renewed for two additional seasons, making the show ABC Family's longest running original series.

The fifth season garnered positive reviews from critics and averaged 2.01 million viewers an episode, down from the previous season, and a 0.9 demo rating, also down from the previous season. The premiere was watched by 2.72 million viewers, while the finale was watched by 2.65 million viewers.

== Overview ==
After Aria inadvertently kills the rooftop shooter, revealed to be Shana, the Liars try to adjust to the new world in which 'A' is presumably dead and Alison is very much alive, while still trying to keep up with Ali's new lie about her whereabouts over the last two years. However, 'A' returns, blowing up the Cavanaugh house and leaving the liars more afraid than ever. With Alison back, Aria, Emily, Hanna and Spencer notice how their friendship has changed since Ali's disappearance. The other residents in Rosewood also deal with Alison coming home, and it leads to Mona making an army against her, consisting of residents whom Ali bullied back in the day. The liars try to figure out who killed Mrs. DiLaurentis, and if there is a connection between her and the girl who was buried in Alison's grave, Bethany Young.

With Alison back, Hanna starts to have an identity crisis, and it progresses when Caleb comes back from Ravenswood and Alison moves into the Marin house. Struggling with guilt after realizing Shana was not 'A', Aria gets help from Ezra, and slowly starts to reconcile with him. Aria also begins to volunteer at Radley in order to find out information about Bethany Young, who was a patient there. Tension begins to swarm between her and Hanna when Hanna almost reveals what happened in New York to the new girl at school, Sydney. Emily tries to deal with her breakup with Paige, while struggling with her feelings toward Alison. She also helps the new girl, Sydney, with her swimming, until she finds out that Sydney knows Jenna. Meanwhile, Spencer deals with her parents splitting up and finding out what Melissa knows about the night Alison disappeared. Following several leads to find out more about Bethany, she learns that Mrs. DiLaurentis had spent some time with her. Furthermore, Melissa reveals that she was the one who buried Bethany because she was trying to protect Spencer, believing that Spencer killed the girl.

As the season progresses, the four girls begin to feel uncertain about Alison and whether she is telling them the truth, and Alison begins to lose their trust. The friendship hits a breaking point when Ali has to identify her so-called "kidnapper", and the girls realize that Alison has lied to them the entire time she has been back. They ultimately decide that she can't be trusted anymore. They then set up a plan to confess everything to the police. However, 'A' stops them before they can go through with the plan, and the liars find out that Alison has gone rogue. Teaming up with Mona, they discover that the police suspect Spencer of killing Bethany Young, and that Mrs. DiLaurentis had an affair with Bethany Young's father. After telling the girls she thinks that Alison is 'A', Mona is approached by 'A' and presumed dead in the ensuing confrontation. Spencer is arrested for Bethany's murder.

The Liars and their allies relentlessly pursue evidence to prove Alison killed Mona. Through the clues Mona left for them, they were able to get Alison charged and arrested for both Mona and Bethany's murders, clearing Spencer of the charges in the process. However, the girls realize someone is still helping Alison, who they now believe was trying to drag them down with her in jail. Their initial suspect is Detective Holbrook, but Holbrook reveals to Hanna that Alison cut him off. Their next suspect is Mike, Aria's brother, who has been secretly visiting Alison in jail. Mike eventually reveals to Aria that Mona was working with 'A' to have Alison arrested by faking her death, although the actual possibility that Mona may be dead remains unknown.

Realizing that Alison is innocent, the girls decided to work on proving Ali's innocence without incriminating Mike. However, Hanna becomes a suspect in Mona's murder, and is arrested after her blood is found on Mona's clothes. Aria, Spencer, and Emily, along with Ezra and Caleb, try to get any evidence that could help Alison and Hanna, though 'A' keeps on getting one step ahead of them. Mike considers taking the stand on Alison's trial; while Caleb agrees with Mike, Aria and Ezra convince him otherwise. Alison's trial ends with her being found guilty on Mona's murder, and subsequently, Aria, Spencer, and Emily are arrested as accessories. After being kidnapped by 'A' on their way to the prison, Hanna, Aria, Spencer and Emily awaken in a dollhouse lair, with rooms designed to look like their bedrooms with surveillance. They discover that Mona had indeed faked her death; however, she is going under the name Alison in the presence of 'A'. They attempt to leave during the "prom" 'A' forces them to create. Spencer then learns A's name: Charles, who is the oldest child of Kenneth and Jessica DiLaurentis. Upon managing to escape the dollhouse, they learn that they are surrounded by an electric fence and therefore trapped.

== Cast ==
=== Main cast ===
- Troian Bellisario as Spencer Hastings
- Ashley Benson as Hanna Marin
- Tyler Blackburn as Caleb Rivers^{1}
- Lucy Hale as Aria Montgomery
- Ian Harding as Ezra Fitz
- Laura Leighton as Ashley Marin
- Shay Mitchell as Emily Fields
- Janel Parrish as Mona Vanderwaal
- Sasha Pieterse as Alison DiLaurentis

=== Recurring cast ===
- Keegan Allen as Toby Cavanaugh
- Lesley Fera as Veronica Hastings
- Lindsey Shaw as Paige McCullers
- Roma Maffia as Lieutenant Linda Tanner
- Cody Allen Christian as Mike Montgomery
- Drew Van Acker as Jason DiLaurentis
- Brandon W. Jones as Andrew Campbell
- Chloe Bridges as Sydney Driscoll
- Miranda Rae Mayo as Talia Mendoza
- Melanie Moreno as Cindy
- Monica Moreno as Mindy
- Torrey DeVitto as Melissa Hastings
- Nolan North as Peter Hastings
- Brendan Robinson as Lucas Gottesman
- Jim Abele as Kenneth DiLaurentis
- Sean Faris as Detective Gabriel Holbrook
- Will Bradley as Johnny Raymond

=== Guest cast ===
- Holly Marie Combs as Ella Montgomery
- Jake Weary as Cyrus Petrillo
- Tammin Sursok as Jenna Marshall
- Andrea Parker as Jessica DiLaurentis
- Lauren Tom as Rebecca Marcus
- Chad Lowe as Byron Montgomery
- Aeriél Miranda as Shana Fring
- Brant Daugherty as Noel Kahn
- Edward Kerr as Ted Wilson
- Steve Talley as Zack
- Vanessa Ray as CeCe Drake
- Reggie Austin as Eddie Lamb
- Luke Kleintank as Travis Hobbs
- Ambrit Millhouse as Big Rhonda
- Sydney Penny as Leona Vanderwaal
- Charles Carpenter as James Neilan
- Elizabeth McLaughlin as Lesli Stone
- Oliver Kieran-Jones as Colin
- Christopher Grove as Douglas Sirk
- Austin Lyon as Matt
- Nia Peeples as Pam Fields
- Jim Titus as Officer Barry Maple
- Roark Critchlow as Tom Marin
- Paloma Guzmán as Jackie Molina
- John O'Brien as Arthur Hackett
- Meg Foster as Carla Grunwald
- Sara Shepard as Herself
- Isabella Rice as Young Alison DiLaurentis
- Wyatt Hodge as Little Charles
- Danielle Macdonald as Cathy

- ^Note 1: Tyler Blackburn is credited as a series regular from episode 5 onward.

== Episodes ==
No. overall	No. in season	Title	Directed by	Written by	Original release date	U.S. viewers (millions)
96	1	"EscApe from New York"	Norman Buckley	I. Marlene King	June 10, 2014	2.72
In New York City, while Ezra's life is in jeopardy after being shot by "A", Alison, Hanna, Emily, and Spencer separate from Aria in order to trick 'A' and hold him away from Ezra in the hospital, however, their plan backfires. In the Hastings residence, Melissa has difficult time as a secret from the past haunts her. Ali shows the others an empty theater, owned by Ezra's family. Shana has a vendetta of her own, as she pays a visit to Ezra in the hospital. After CeCe left Rosewood, she goes to New York where Ali helps her leave for France. In Rosewood, Mona, after learning that Alison is back, gathers a group of people tormented by her, including Lucas, Melissa and Paige. Alison reveals to Emily that CeCe was never Red Coat — Alison told Cece to dress up as Red Coat to distract 'A' from sawing Emily. As Ezra wakes up, he whispers the shooters identity to Aria and she immediately leaves the hospital to go to the theater where she sees Shana, dressed as "A", with a gun threatening to kill Ali. Shana reveals that she wanted to kill her as revenge for blinding Jenna, whom she loves. Aria sneaks in in time to save the girls and knocks Shana off of the stage where she is killed instantly after hitting her head. The Liars believe the "A" game is now finally over. Meanwhile, CeCe gets on a plane and leaves for France, using Ali's "Vivian Darkbloom" identity.
97	2	"Whirly Girlie"	Joanna Kerns	Oliver Goldstick	June 17, 2014	2.16
The girls return to Rosewood after a handful of events in New York, finding themselves in a world full of secrets. Aria struggles with Shana's death, while Emily, Hanna and Spencer try to begin navigating a world with Alison in it. Toby returns from London and reveals that Melissa was not there at the time he searched for her. Hanna and Emily are suspicious about Jason and his relationship with his mother so they follow him to Philadelphia to find answers. Ali's new dog later finds out a body buried in front of Ali's house, later revealed to be her mother — Jessica DiLaurentis.
98	3	"Surfing the Aftershocks"	Chad Lowe	Joseph Dougherty	June 24, 2014	2.28
After learning about her mother's death, the girls try to comfort Alison, but to no use. At first, Aria refuses to talk to Ezra, but she later agrees and he says that he will keep quiet. However, Ezra doesn't seem to know about Shana's death, but later Aria tells him the truth about what happened. Emily and Paige connect over helping the new girl on the swimming team, Sydney, with her swimming technique, and in the end they agree to be friends. Hanna begins to go through an identity crisis after a man mistakes her for Alison. Hanna remembers back when Mona made her popular, to be a copy of Alison. Meanwhile, Spencer tries to figure out Jason's involvement in Mrs. DiLaurentis's death, but both Melissa and her father don't seem so positive to Spencer's suspicion.
99	4	"Thrown from the Ride"	Janice Cooke	Maya Goldsmith	July 1, 2014	2.13
Ali attempts to regain the role of leader of the group, but she finds out Aria, Emily, Hanna and Spencer are not as going to blindly follow her as they once were. While most kids are curious about what happened to Ali, Mona and her army are more focused on planning for Ali's return to school. After seeing Shana's funeral online, Aria goes to Ezra for comfort, meanwhile Ali lies to the doctor about an injury. Veronica confesses to Spencer that after Ali went missing, Jessica tried go to the police to accuse Spencer of doing something to Ali, and when Peter threatened her, Veronica became suspicious to him. Spencer arrives at Ali's who tells her that Jessica had Losartan in her system which was for high blood pressure, but since she had low blood pressure, it made her heart stop working. Hanna starts to steal again. Spencer discovers Losartan belonging to her father. After Paige's warning about Mona's army, Emily tells Ali that she should leave, but Ali says she wants to go back to school, even if there are people who want revenge on her, and finishes by saying that if they stick together they should be safe.
100	5	"Miss Me x 100"	Norman Buckley	I. Marlene King	July 8, 2014	2.25
The day has finally arrived for Alison's first day back at Rosewood High. However, neither the girls nor Alison are ready for it. Determined to put on a brave face, Alison returns to also help heal the damage she did years ago. While Spencer's family thought that Mrs. Hastings was at a spa, really she was having a private investigator finding out that Mr. Hastings and Melissa weren't at a dinner as they said. Mrs. Hastings is leaving town alone after a failed attempt to bring Spencer. Aria still suffers from the accident in New York and meets the returning Jenna, who is still grieving for her beloved's death. Mona prepares her "army of losers", in which Sydney and Jenna are revealed to be a part of, for the upcoming war against Ali, which escalated with a meeting between the two that ends in favor of Mona. Meanwhile, Caleb returns to Rosewood and leaves Hanna confused for the reason of his homecoming. Emily and Alison share a kiss and Aria and Ezra have sex. In the end, while the police are giving an interview about the dead girl in Ali's grave, who is revealed to be Bethany Young, 'A' makes their triumphant return to Rosewood by planting a bomb in Toby's house and making the entire house explode. 'A' ending: 'A' is seen texting the girls while moving their belongings into a new 'A' lair.
101	6	"Run, Ali, Run"	Norman Buckley	Jonell Lennon	July 15, 2014	2.13
With "A" back with a vengeance, it leads the Liars to the conclusion that Shana was not the real "A". With the town of Rosewood trying to get back to normal, the Liars — especially Ali — are far from okay after the latest "accident". Alison starts to reconsider her decision about coming home and the possibility of leaving for good, but Aria, Emily, Hanna, and Spencer are determined to keep her safe and to figure out who and what is behind this latest incident. Meanwhile, Caleb also starts second-guessing his return, and Ezra dives into his research about Bethany Young — the girl in Ali's grave — to help find answers that will help the Liars. The issues between Spencer's parents finally end when one of them is forced to leave home for good, leaving Spencer in an uncomfortable situation. A connection between Bethany and Mrs. DiLaurentis links to Radley so the Liars begin their next plan as Aria volunteers to work there in order to get further information. 'A' sends Alison a text message, saying "I buried your mom the same way I watched her bury you". Towards the climax of the episode, 'A' attacks Alison in her house and chokes her, almost killing her. They fight until Emily comes and saves Alison. After 'A's attempt to strangle Alison, she gets a text message, "See how easy it is for me to kill you? If you leave Rosewood, I will. -A". 'A' ending: 'A' dressed as Black Widow sends flowers and a condolences card to Bethany Young's parents.
102	7	"The Silence of E. Lamb"	Joshua Butler	Bryan M. Holdman	July 22, 2014	2.06
Aria begins her volunteer work at Radley and quickly gets down to business finding answers about a patient of interest to the Liars, but she quickly hits a snag when she comes across an aggressive patient – Big Rhonda, who may be the key to what the Liars are looking for. Emily tries to find a distraught Paige after the latest "prank" on her with a rat. Also searching for answers, Spencer takes a note from Ezra's play book by borrowing some of his spy equipment to keep a closer eye on the home front, mainly on Melissa. Meanwhile, Hanna is caught at odds when Ali and Caleb butt heads, and Emily seeks help from her friends when her mom invites Ali over for dinner. Hanna is the only one that is able to join Emily and Ali when Aria gets stuck in Radley and Spencer continues her mission by following Melissa's moves. Hanna, however, begins drinking and Emily is forced to kick her out. Aria, Spencer, and Emily are all caught off guard when 'A' sends them a message but not Hanna, involving Ali and her recent actions. 'A' ending: 'A' opens up Ella's engagement party letter and taking a picture of the letter, then gluing it back together like it was never opened.
103	8	"Scream for Me"	Bethany Rooney	Oliver Goldstick & Maya Goldsmith	July 29, 2014	1.80
Detective Tanner asks questions that suggest the cops aren’t buying Alison’s story. In an effort to counter this, Alison spends time with Mrs. Marin, fabricating details about her kidnapping and gaining sympathy. Mrs. Marin offers to let Alison stay at her house for a few days. Hanna is angry with Alison for involving her mother in things, and spends as much time away from home as possible while Alison is there. Toby reveals that he has joined the police academy, but Spencer isn’t sure she likes the idea. Aria bribes Rhonda with illicit snacks in exchange for information about Bethany. She learns that Mrs. DiLaurentis used to sign Bethany out of Radley for day trips to a horse stable. When Hanna stops by The Brew for a late night snack, Zack flirts with her and touches her inappropriately. She confides in Spencer and Emily, but they accuse her of being drunk and doubt her perception of the incident. Zack later finds Hanna alone in her car and gives her his number. Hanna rushes to Aria’s house to tell her everything. Aria is furious with Hanna, accusing her of being drunk and flirting with Zack. She refuses to believe Hanna’s account of what happened. Spencer and Emily visit the horse stables and speak to a man who works there. He recalls that Mrs. DiLaurentis wanted Bethany to call her “Aunt Jessie.” While snooping around, Spencer finds Melissa’s riding helmet. She and Emily get locked in a stall with a spooked horse, and in the process of escaping, Spencer’s eye is injured. Alison and Mrs. Marin are making dinner plans when a figure dressed in black breaks into the house. Detective Tanner comes to take statements, but her questions once again suggest that she doesn’t believe a word Alison says. Alison later admits to Spencer and Emily that the intruder was Noel Kahn, and that he broke into the house at her request. 'A' ending: 'A’ is in Spencer’s bedroom. They caress a riding helmet as if the object is dear to them. They also reveal a secret compartment under a chair cushion, although the viewer is not shown what’s inside.
104	9	"March of Crimes"	Chad Lowe	Oliver Goldstick & Maya Goldsmith	August 5, 2014	2.05
Alison is desperate for the police to believe her. She tries to rally her friends, stressing the importance of keeping “their” story straight, but the girls are beginning to wonder if lying for Alison is worth the antics. Emily breaks into Noel’s car, finding a tape recorder and several printed photos of Alison from when she was missing. Emily meets Spencer at the eye doctor to show her the evidence. Spencer agrees to find a hiding place for it. She also claims to have seen Jenna standing with another Jenna while her vision was hazy. Emily sees the “Jennas,” but recognizes that one is actually Sydney. Emily is furious with Sydney for lying to get close to her. She threatens to use her new assistant coach role to keep a close eye on Sydney from now on. Spencer has just locked up the tape recorder and photos in her lake house when she discovers Noel hiding underneath a sheet. Noel explains that, although he is doing favors for Alison, he expects she will turn on him. Spencer asks if he’s planning to blackmail Alison, but Noel balks at the accusation. He says it’s just insurance. Spencer refuses to return the evidence to him, but promises to keep it somewhere safe. Hanna has decided not to attend Ella and Zack’s engagement party. Caleb presses her to explain, and she admits that Zack was creepy to her. Caleb immediately tracks Zack down at The Brew and punches him in the jaw. Aria tells her mom that Zack might have been inappropriate with Hanna. Ella is visibly upset, but not surprised. The engagement party and the wedding are canceled. Aria finds Hanna to tell her what happened and ask for her forgiveness. The two hug and mend their friendship. The police notify Alison that they may have identified her kidnapper. Alison goes to the station and hears part of the suspect’s interview. His story sounds a lot like her own, but she does not confirm or deny recognizing him. 'A' ending: 'A’ is waiting to be seen at the eye doctor. A nurse is visibly confused by the hoodie and gloves they’re wearing, but doesn’t ask questions. ‘A’ puts in earbuds and listens to a recording of Alison telling her kidnapping story.
105	10	"A Dark Ali"	Arlene Sanford	Lijah J. Barasz	August 12, 2014	2.05
Cyrus is being held for 48 hours and everyone is waiting to see if Alison will identify him as her kidnapper. With the clock ticking, opinions on the situation differ and tension builds. Mr. DiLaurentis is convinced of Cyrus’s guilt. Spencer wants to come clean to the police about everything, but Aria and Emily are not on board. Aria doesn’t want the cops linking her to Shana’s death, and Emily doesn’t want to betray Alison. Hanna has no faith that Alison will account for any opinions besides her own, so she focuses instead on making healthier choices with Caleb and going to a choir audition. Hanna witnesses an incident where Mona passes out at the audition. Emily tells Alison that Cyrus shouldn’t go down for a kidnapping that didn’t happen. Alison admits that she lived with Cyrus in a basement while she was on the run. He stole money and belongings from her. He was also the one who gave her the scar on her leg. Emily says that, because the police don’t know about these incidents, Alison still has to let Cyrus go. Aria thinks that ‘A’ has a plan to reveal her connection to Shana’s death if Alison identifies Cyrus. Ezra wants to talk to Alison, but Aria is against this. She believes that he will put himself in danger by involving himself in the situation. Ezra promises he won’t speak to Alison, but goes back on that promise when he sees her at The Brew later. Detective Tanner takes Alison to the basement where she lived with Cyrus. She identifies the location, implying the identification of Cyrus as well. It’s too late, though, and Cyrus was already released. Alison later meets up with Cyrus in secret. They discuss the deal they made: Cyrus would confess to kidnapping Alison, and she would help him get away after his release. After hearing that Alison ID-ed Cyrus, the other four girls decide it’s time to cut ties with her and talk to the police. 'A' ending: ‘A’ is watching a dog show on TV. They fold a black hoodie and stack it with another. They also fold a candy striper pinafore.
106	11	"No One Here Can Love or Understand Me"	Larry Reibman	Joseph Dougherty	August 19, 2014	1.80
The girls are headed for the police station when a message from ‘A’ stops them in their tracks. A bunch of TV screens display photos of Alison visiting Hanna in the hospital after Camp Mona. The accompanying message, “We’re all in this together,” sends a clear warning: if Alison goes down, ‘A’ will take the girls down, too. It’s starting to feel like ‘A’ and Alison have very similar motivations. Emily gives Ezra one of Noel’s photos. It shows Alison at an ATM with a man whose back is to the camera. Ezra later returns to Emily with another photo from the same security camera, but this one shows that the man is Cyrus Petrillo. Mona is invited on a Montgomery family trip to the theater as Mike’s date. Aria whispers something hateful to Mona during the movie, and Mona excuses herself. Later, Aria finds her crying in the restroom. Mona says that Aria got her sharp tongue from Alison. She warns Aria that Alison will turn on her without a second thought. Hanna notices that Caleb hasn’t committed to staying sober with her. She and Spencer enlist Toby’s help in hopes that he will be able to get through to Caleb. Unfortunately, Toby’s intervention skills are subpar, and Caleb isn’t receptive. Unwilling to give up, Hanna confronts Caleb later that night, and he finally tells her about Ravenswood. Melissa has gone to London without warning, leaving Spencer a “goodbye” note and a video. In it, Melissa explains what happened the night Alison went missing. She describes seeing Spencer with a shovel, and later finding a blonde girl in a yellow top on the ground. Melissa assumed that Spencer struck and killed Alison. She buried the girl to protect Spencer, but realizes now that she buried Bethany Young alive. Detective Tanner has started asking what the girls know about Bethany, and it seems like they’ve all become suspects. Knowing this, Spencer decides to share Melissa’s video with the others. Things are definitely getting messy, and to top it all off, Alison has agreed to a police interview.
107	12	"Taking This One to the Grave"	Ron Lagomarsino	I. Marlene King	August 26, 2014	2.29
The police are hellbent on finding a connection between the liars and Bethany Young. Alison agrees to take a polygraph test, leaving the other girls to wonder what her story is going to be this time. They know just who to ask for help: Mona Vanderwaal. Mona concedes that her anger toward Alison has been unfairly directed at the other girls, and she apologizes. She agrees to find out exactly what Alison is telling the police. Mona hacks into the police computer system and downloads a video of Alison’s interview. The polygrapher’s questions assume a scenario where Spencer killed Bethany to gain favor with Alison. Caleb discovers that Spencer has replaced Alison as the prime suspect in Bethany’s murder. This change was made just after the police uncovered information related to Bethany’s time at Radley. The group hatches a plan to get Bethany’s Radley files. Hanna and Caleb hack the building’s security system while Spencer and Mona sneak inside. Aria causes a distraction in the art room so Mona can snag a set of keys. Meanwhile, Emily keeps Alison busy and away from their heist. They end up finding and stealing audio recordings of Bethany’s counseling sessions. The following day, the girls are at The Brew when Detective Holbrook bursts through the door. He arrests Spencer for the murder of Bethany Young. Mona goes through the recordings of Bethany. She learns that Bethany knew about an affair between her father and Alison’s mother. Mrs. DiLaurentis was bribing her to keep it quiet. Mona concludes that a jealous Alison lured Bethany to Rosewood the night she died. She calls Aria to relay this information. Meanwhile, a figure with blonde hair and a black hoodie sneaks inside Mona’s house. Mona is just getting off the phone when the figure opens the door to her bedroom. Mona is shocked, scared, and cornered. Aria brings Hanna and Emily to Mona’s house where they find a disturbing scene. There are clear signs of a struggle inside, and blood is splattered everywhere. The police survey the area and determine that Mona Vanderwaal has been murdered. 'A' ending: ‘A’ replaces the baby Jesus in Emily’s nativity scene with a Mona doll. They open the trunk of a car to reveal Mona’s lifeless body. In a separate scene, ‘A’ makes a snow globe and puts photos of the liars inside.
108	13	"How the 'A' Stole Christmas"	I. Marlene King	I. Marlene King & Kyle Bown	December 9, 2014	2.09
Spencer is out on bail for Bethany Young’s murder, and her friends are hoping to find a way to prove her innocence. The girls are walking downtown when Mona’s lawyer approaches and gives Hanna an envelope. Inside is a map of the DiLaurentis house with Alison’s hiding spots labeled. Hanna thinks that Mona is telling them where to find proof that Alison is ‘A’. They decide the “Ice Ball” Alison is hosting could be the perfect opportunity for a heist. Alison has a vivid dream. Mona visits her from beyond the grave and shows her a memory: A young Alison finds two hidden Christmas gifts, each containing a yellow dress. Alison’s mother insists that, if her father asks, she must say she only found one dress. Mona says this was the birth of the monster Alison became. The girls meet up at the ball. Once Alison arrives, Hanna and Spencer sneak away to search her house. Toby sits by Spencer’s bedroom window and acts as a lookout while they’re inside. Spencer finds newspapers that show Alison communicating with someone through personal ads. Hanna finds a fake passport, as well as a letter to Alison from Bethany. The letter proves that Alison invited Bethany to Rosewood the day she was killed. Back at the ball, Aria and Emily are keeping eyes on Alison. Jenna, Sydney, Cindy, and Mindy seem to be members of her new clique. Aria sees Alison kiss Detective Holbrook. A little while later, Alison sneaks away to meet up with Cece. Aria and Emily are tricked by Cindy and Mindy, causing them to lose track of Alison. Toby texts Hanna and Spencer to warn them. Spencer hides, but Hanna is away from her phone. A black-hooded figure with a knife stalks through the house. The figure goes upstairs and Spencer follows. She finds Hanna knocked out, but is able to wake her up. That night, Alison is visited by Mona in another dream. Alison sees a casket with her own body inside. She asks about the nature of her death, but Mona has no answers. She says no one cares about Alison’s fate. The girls and their partners celebrate Christmas together. A noise from the chimney interrupts the festivities. They go outside to find a message spelled out in lights strung across the Hastings’ barn: “Merry Christmas, Bitches. -A.”
109	14	"Through a Glass, Darkly"	Chad Lowe	Joseph Dougherty & Lijah J. Barasz	January 6, 2015	2.01
The girls attend Mona’s funeral, but an empty casket makes it hard to get closure from the ceremony. Alison makes an appearance after the service and is met with a literal slap in the face from Mrs. Vanderwaal. Hanna seeks unorthodox methods of finding Mona’s body. She meets with Mrs. Grunwald, who uses a sentimental item to connect with Mona’s spirit. She says Mona is surrounded by darkness and earth. Spencer’s indictment is unsealed, revealing a witness statement taken by Detective Wilden more than two years ago. In it, Mrs. DiLaurentis claimed to have seen Spencer with a blonde girl the night Bethany Young was killed. Now, Bethany’s family is trying to get Spencer’s bail revoked. Spencer pleads with Jason to admit that he lied about Alison’s alibi. Jason seems unwilling to betray Alison, and sends Spencer away. He later asks Alison where she really went on Thanksgiving. She won’t answer the question, but insists that she did not kill Mona. Emily has the idea to plant Alison’s DNA at the crime scene. Spencer is hesitant, but ultimately agrees to the plan. The two are at the Vanderwaal house when they find a camera hidden inside a vent. It captured a struggle between Mona and her blonde-haired killer. The police show the video to Jason. He admits that the blonde in the footage could be Alison. The police prepare to arrest Alison as she prepares to flee. The girls intercept her behind her house and form a human barricade, preventing her from running. She gives one last ominous warning before the police handcuff her. Spencer’s charges are officially dropped. Mike opens up about his feelings for the first time since Mona’s death. He is frustrated that more people are mourning her now than appreciated her when she was alive. Realizing she was one of those people, Aria asks to learn about the version of Mona that Mike knew and loved. Emily meets Paige at the airport, but the news of Alison’s arrest does not convince her to stay. The two share a tearful goodbye. The liars’ relief that ‘A’ has finally been caught is short-lived, as the tails of three fireworks form the letter ‘A’ in the sky. It seems that ‘A’ might still be out there while Alison tosses and turns in a jail cell.
110	15	"Fresh Meat"	Zetna Fuentes	Oliver Goldstick & Maya Goldsmith	January 13, 2015	2.02
Toby witnesses Alison looking absolutely defeated in jail. She asks him to tell the others that ‘A’ is still out there and wants every one of them behind bars. The girls suspect that Detective Holbrook has been helping Alison, and Hanna wants to talk to him. She learns that Holbrook has been taking care of his sick father and decides to take a detour during a college visit. When Hanna finds Holbrook’s father, the man looks perfectly healthy and doesn’t know the whereabouts of his son. The police are searching behind the Vanderwaal house when Toby finds a bloody knife. He later tells Spencer and Caleb that he regrets not alerting the other officers to it. Considering Alison’s warning, Spencer and Caleb are worried that the knife was planted by ‘A’. They want to get rid of it. Neither side is willing to entertain the other’s idea, so all three promise to leave the knife alone. Ezra’s caterer quits last-minute and Emily offers to fill in. She wants to save up to visit Paige over spring break. Ezra initially agrees, but ends up hiring a professional chef named Talia. Emily insists on sticking it out in the kitchen to prove herself. She and Talia butt heads until Emily breaks down and explains her situation. Talia responds with empathy and helps Emily fix her questionable empanadas. When Aria learns that Jackie Molina is the admissions officer at Talmadge, she writes an unfaithful e-mail expressing regret for her relationship with Ezra. Jackie reads the letter and expresses solidarity with Aria for falling for the same awful man. Aria gets her acceptance from Talmadge, but knows that ‘A’ will use her letter against her soon. Jason stops by the Marin house on professional business, and Ashley asks him to stay for dinner. It’s clear that the two are both feeling vulnerable. They share a kiss and end up taking things to the bedroom. Spencer and Caleb decide to go back for the knife. They find it in the woods and burn it in Rosewood High’s walk-in pottery kiln. ‘A’ lurks around the school and even locks Caleb inside the kiln, but the pair are ultimately successful. Later, Toby confronts Spencer about breaking their promise. She tries to explain, but Toby can’t hear the details. In the battle for his loyalty, Toby’s new police job is edging Spencer out.
111	16	"Over a Barrel"	Michael Grossman	Bryan M. Holdman	January 20, 2015	1.72
Aria gets a text signed by Detective Holbrook asking to meet up and explain everything. It's a dubious request, but she sees it as a chance to convince him to stop helping Alison. Aria soon finds herself on a wild goose chase. The meeting time and place change twice, and Holbrook never shows. The Hastings are renting out their barn to Jonny, a scrappy guy who makes his own tempera paint. He tells Spencer about dropping out of college and traveling the world. Spencer begins to reconsider her plans for the future. Paige makes it clear that she is unprepared to date long-distance. Emily wears one of Paige’s shirts to work and bristles when Talia points out a hole in the shoulder. Talia correctly assumes that the shirt is representative of Emily’s relationship with Paige, and suggests she let go of both. Pastor Ted asks Hanna to meet him in town. He reveals his plan to propose to Ashley and asks Hanna’s permission. Hanna gives her blessing, then goes to confront her mother. She presses about whether Ashley plans to tell Ted about what happened with Jason. Ashley dodges the question. When Ted produces a ring that night, Ashley panics. She does not give Ted a response. Mona’s stolen laptop is activated by its thief, triggering an automatic text to be sent to the girls. The message includes a set of coordinates that reveals the location of the laptop. Spencer and Caleb follow the coordinates to a storage unit with a heavy-duty lock and an awful smell coming from inside. They gain access by traveling through the building's air vents. Inside is Mona’s laptop, several bags of crime scene evidence, and a large, ominous barrel. Spencer is disturbed by the possibility that Mona’s body is dissolving inside. They leave the storage unit as they found it, and Caleb wipes the building's security footage. Toby spies a text from Caleb on Spencer's phone that alludes to their recent felonious behavior. He presses for details, but Spencer is tight-lipped. Meanwhile, Caleb and Hanna discuss the contents of the storage unit. Hanna's next plan is to connect everything to Holbrook, but Caleb has bad news: the unit is rented in Hanna's name. 'A' ending: 'A' logs into Detective Holbrook's computer at the police department.
112	17	"The Bin of Sin"	Tripp Reed	Jonell Lennon	January 27, 2015	2.00
'A' has decided to make Hanna their scapegoat, leaving her in a state of panic. Caleb corrupts the storage facility's data and dissociates Hanna's name from 'A's unit. The other girls want to tell Detective Tanner about Mona's laptop and let the cops do the rest. Hanna is unsatisfied with this plan. Secretly, she gathers the equipment she'll need to empty the storage unit. Caleb tries to talk her out of the idea, but ends up agreeing to help her. Aria shows Ezra her Talmadge letter, and he initially takes it well. Upon reflection, though, he finds some truth in what Aria wrote about their relationship. Ezra says that Aria shouldn't be held back by him when she goes to college next year. Talia acts strangely at work, and Emily assumes she has a crush on Ezra. When confronted, Talia admits that she's really interested in Emily. Ashley wants to agree to Ted's marriage proposal. She officially quits her job at Jason's real estate office, intending to forget that anything happened between them. On her way out, Jason steals another kiss from her. Hanna and Caleb break into 'A's storage unit, finding it empty apart from the mysterious barrel in the middle of the room. They are forced to abandon their plan to move the barrel when they run into Detective Tanner and Toby. Tanner looks inside the barrel, but neither Toby nor the audience sees its contents. Spencer sees that Mona's laptop is on the move and assumes that Hanna went rogue. She, Aria, and Emily follow the laptop to an abandoned ice cream factory where they find the rest of the evidence from 'A's storage unit. On the laptop, a looping video plays of Hanna explaining her plan to Caleb earlier that day. 'A' shuts Aria and Spencer inside an industrial freezer, and Emily arrives just in time to save them from certain death. Spencer warns Hanna about the recording 'A' has of her. Hanna accuses Spencer of letting Toby know about 'A's storage unit, but Spencer denies this. She defends Toby's recent allegiance with the police despite taking issue with it herself. 'A' ending: 'A' lurks around the ice cream factory with a black light and finds hand prints left behind by the liars.
113	18	"Oh, What Hard Luck Stories They All Hand Me"	Joseph Dougherty	Joseph Dougherty	February 3, 2015	1.80
Preparations are being made for Alison's trial, and the girls are anxious to know what the verdict will be. They continue to grapple with the sudden disillusionment of their friendship. Jonny is creating an art installation for The Brew. Spencer is fascinated by Jonny and his work. She spends time with him, much to the disapproval of her mother, who believes Jonny's influence is causing Spencer to abandon her plans for the future. Talia continues to flirt with Emily, who mulls over her feelings before deciding to reciprocate. The two share a kiss. A girl named Lesli introduces herself as one of Mona's close friends. She is staying in the Vanderwaal house and providing emotional support to Mona's mother. Hanna spends some time with Lesli to get a better read on her. When the two run into Mike Montgomery at The Brew, he sees that Lesli took a book from Mona's room. He is furious, shouting at Hanna and Lesli before storming away. Lesli reveals that she spoke with Mona over the phone the day before she died. She remembers Mike interrupting the call, demanding to talk to Mona, and sounding very angry. Veronica is consulting Alison's defense team in exchange for insider information. Spencer snoops in her mother's work bag and sees Mike's name on the jail's visitor log. Aria wants to confront Mike about his recent behavior, but fears hurting her already-grieving brother. She secretly follows him when he leaves the house late at night. Mike drives to a lake and leaves a bag of gumdrops on the pier. He catches Aria spying and is angry with her now, too. Hanna discovers a secret compartment in the binding of Mona's book. Inside is one of Bethany's Radley tapes. She and Caleb listen to the recording, in which Bethany describes an unnamed female character as manipulative and violent. On her way home, Detective Holbrook pulls Hanna over. He blames Alison for his recent suspension from the police department. Hanna confronts Holbrook about doing Alison's dirty work, and he denies his involvement in any recent 'A' activity. The girls need to look elsewhere for 'A's henchman, and Mike has been drawing a lot of their suspicion. 'A' ending: 'A' is frustrated to find that Bethany's Radley tape is missing from the compartment in Mona's book.
114	19	"Out, Damned Spot"	Nzingha Stewart	Lijah J. Barasz	February 10, 2015	1.77
Aria, Hanna, and Spencer donate to their school's blood drive. Mike is caught looking inside the fridge where donations are being stored. The girls tell Aria to ask Mike what's up, but Aria hesitates. She doubts her brother will answer her questions, and fears what she'll find out if he does. The stress leads Aria to panic during a math test and copy answers from Andrew Campbell. Andrew confronts Aria about her wandering eye and offers to tutor her. Hanna is swimming in college offers, but tuition is a whole different beast. Financial aid isn't granting her enough because of her father's substantial income. Tom admits that he plans to pay for Kate's private education. Having underestimated Hanna's prospects, he isn't prepared to do the same for her. Hanna calls her father out for his lack of interest in her. Jonny asks Spencer to help him with a "mural" he's painting at Hollis. While he works, Spencer reflects on how seldom she does anything for fun. It comes out the next day that Jonny's "mural" was really graffiti. Spencer is angry, feeling that Jonny tricked her into breaking the law. Still, the experience did give her something valuable. Emily finds out that Talia is married. Talia apologizes for lying and explains that she and her husband have an open relationship. Ashley comes clean to Ted about her night with Jason. She is ready to accept his proposal, but he tells her he needs time to think. Aria answers Mike's phone when she sees a private call come in. The call is from the women’s correctional facility and it is Alison's voice saying the name Hank Mahoney. Aria answers by saying Alison’s name, upon hearing her, Alison hangs up. Aria asks Mike who Hank Mahoney is, and he claims not to know. Later, Emily sees Mike withdraw $400 from an ATM. She interrupts Aria's tutoring session to relay what she saw. Andrew drives Aria and Emily to a diner where Mike is meeting up with "Hank Mahoney," whom Emily recognizes as Cyrus Petrillo. Mike hands Cyrus a thick envelope. The girls initially assume it's the cash, but they start to wonder if it could be their blood instead. Largely oblivious to the situation, Andrew scares Cyrus away before the girls can ask him any questions. 'A' ending: 'A' drips some of Hanna's blood onto the clothes that Mona was wearing when she was killed.
115	20	"Pretty Isn't the Point"	Melanie Mayron	Oliver Goldstick & Francesca Rollins	February 17, 2015	2.05
The girls find a necklace in Mike's bedroom whose beads spell out "I'm with you" in morse code. They wonder if the necklace is for Alison. Later, Mike interrupts Aria's tutoring session with Andrew. He shouts at her, warning her not to go in his room again. Talia's husband stops by The Brew. He realizes who Emily is, and his understanding seems to be that Emily is an experiment for Talia. Emily is hurt that Talia would think of her this way. She decides to end the relationship. Spencer and Jonny see their graffiti hanging in an art gallery, and the two of them decide to break in and reclaim the paintings. The heist goes well until Jonny trips an alarm. Toby tracks down their getaway van and arrests Jonny, but tells Spencer to leave the scene. Veronica pays Jonny's bail before evicting him. Spencer is apologetic, but Jonny assures her that he will be fine. He steals a kiss from Spencer before leaving. Hanna signs up for a beauty pageant whose prize money would help pay for college. She recruits Emily to help prepare a dance number. 'A' fools Hanna into thinking that Kate is competing in the same pageant, causing her to botch the choreography in front of her coach. Emily decides to compete in the pageant herself, promising Hanna the prize money if she wins. Andrew tells Aria that Mike left something in a tree behind Mona's house. Aria finds the tree and recovers a vial of blood from it. Mike appears suddenly, causing Aria to drop the vial before running away. Mike chases after Aria and begs her to let him explain. Before Thanksgiving, Mona had been siphoning and storing her own blood as part of a scheme to fake her own death. Landing Alison in jail for murder would earn Mona the privilege of knowing 'A's identity. She could then come "back from the dead," exonerate Alison, and expose 'A'. The vial of her blood was a parting gift to Mike; a promise that she would return. With no sign of Mona in months, Mike is afraid that 'A' double-crossed her. One revelation sticks out above the rest: Alison is in jail for something she didn't do, and the girls helped put her there. 'A' ending: 'A' uses Mike's weight set before taking out a wrench, their intentions not entirely clear.
116	21	"Bloody Hell"	Arlene Sanford	Maya Goldsmith	February 24, 2015	1.58
Aria, Spencer, and Emily visit Alison in jail. They tell her what they've learned and promise to help prove her innocence. Alison wants Mike to testify, but Aria is afraid of putting a target on her brother's back. She insists that, if they can find 'A', they can exonerate Alison without Mike's testimony. Veronica wants Spencer to stay away from Alison's case and focus on her future. She sends Spencer to London to meet with a professor at Oxford. During the interview, Spencer's bag starts leaking blood. 'A' takes credit for the stunt, suggesting that there are more surprises where that came from. Spencer searches her luggage in a panic until Melissa's roommate, Colin, steps in to help her calm down. Talia decides all at once to quit her job and file for divorce. Feeling partially responsible for Talia's situation, Emily offers her a place to stay for a few days. Veronica visits Alison in jail. Alison says that her lawyers won't let her testify, and Veronica agrees that it's a bad idea. Alison's mind is made up, though, and she asks Veronica to coach her before she takes the stand. Aria and Hanna visit Cyrus Petrillo at the hospital where he is being treated for severe burns. They ask Cyrus what he knows about 'A', and he writes down the name "Varjack." Emily is rehearsing for the beauty pageant when Talia stops by. The sparks of a relationship are flying once again when the pageant coordinator interrupts. She warns Emily that her friendship with a murder suspect could make her ineligible to compete. Talia sticks up for Emily, pointing out that Alison is innocent until proven guilty. Aria is using Mike's workout bench as a step stool when it breaks underneath her. Andrew notices the bench had a mismatched nut and bolt, and Aria knows that 'A' is responsible. Concerned for Mike's safety, Aria seeks comfort in a kiss with Andrew. Ashley tells Hanna that she and Ted are officially engaged. She describes how they worked through their conflict together, and Hanna feels inspired to try the same with Alison. Hanna visits the jail, and Alison surprises her by offering the first apology. The two agree to give their friendship another try. 'A' ending: 'A' uses a $20 bill to bookmark Deuteronomy 32:35 in each of the jail's Bibles.
117	22	"To Plea or Not to Plea"	Arthur Anderson	Jonell Lennon	March 3, 2015	1.49
The D.A. offers Alison a plea deal: In exchange for her admitted guilt and the name of her accomplice, she will get a maximum of 15 years in jail. Alison doesn't want to give a false confession or name a fake accomplice. However, when she is attacked by a group of inmates, she begins to wonder if taking the plea could help her negotiate a move to a safer prison. Melissa and Spencer have a heart-to-heart about everything happening back home. Melissa says that leaving Rosewood gave her a fresh start, and suggests that Spencer could do the same. Colin asks Spencer on an outing that looks a lot like a date. They go to the theater, get drinks, and end the night by sharing a kiss. Varjak's identity is still a mystery. The girls know that the Holly Varjak passport, along with the other evidence from the DiLaurentis house, was planted to make Alison look guilty. Ezra theorizes that 'A' hired James Neilan to pose as Mona's lawyer. Aria and Emily wait outside Neilan's office while Ezra tries to shake him down for information. Neilan won't budge, though, and Ezra leaves empty-handed. Their plan is looking like a bust until they see Neilan leaving his office in a hurry. They follow him to a house in the middle of the woods surrounded by a tall fence. Emily makes it inside just before the gate closes, separating her from the others. Aria and Ezra look for another way in while Emily conducts a solo mission. She finds Varjak's name and phone number on a receipt in a trash can and watches a frantic Neilan pack up several things (a gun, etc.) before he leaves again. The contents of the barrel from 'A's storage unit are identified as human remains. Detective Tanner strongly believes they are Mona's, and that Hanna is Alison's accomplice. Tanner's theory is seemingly confirmed when Hanna's blood is found on the clothes Mona was wearing when she died. The only option Hanna has left is to tell the police about 'A'. Before she can, though, 'A' remotely deletes their texts from all of the liars' phones. With no proof to show, Hanna is arrested. Alison sees Hanna being led to her cell, and when her lawyer asks for a final decision on the plea deal, Alison refuses it.
118	23	"The Melody Lingers On"	Roger Kumble	Joseph Dougherty	March 10, 2015	1.74
Alison's lawyer consults with her one last time before her trial begins. Ashley and Ted check in on Hanna, as her fate is also dependent on the verdict. Spencer realizes that Varjak's number matches the number in Alison's personal ads, proving that whomever Alison was communicating with shares an identity with Varjak and 'A'. Alison says that this person claimed to know who killed her mother, and that their messages stopped after Mona was killed. 'A' quickly shuts down the idea that Mona was ever behind the number by calling and playing a French song that Mona used to love. While talking to Aria, Andrew seems to imply that Mona's death was a welcome occurrence. Later, Andrew apologizes and assures Aria that the comment he made doesn't reflect his true feelings. Veronica forbids Spencer from attending Alison's trial. After missing the first day, Spencer decides she cannot continue to follow her mother's orders. She cares less about what the public thinks of her and more about what her friends think of her. In the prosecutor's opening statement, he tells the jury that Alison lied about being kidnapped, that Mona knew the truth, and that Alison killed her to keep the secret. The girls begin to panic because the first of his claims is true. Jason takes the stand to rescind his earlier identification of Alison in the video of Mona's killer. The prosecutor presses Jason about the change to his testimony, accusing him of doing a favor for Hanna's mother in return for the "favors" she did for him. The public broadcasting of Ashley's affair riles up Ted's congregation and puts some strain back on their relationship. The girls return to Mona's bedroom to search for more clues, only to find the place turned upside-down. It looks like whatever Mona left for them, 'A' found it first. However, Aria realizes that 'A' could have staged the scene to trick the girls into leaving. Her theory is proven correct when Spencer looks behind the glass of a hand mirror and finds a note consisting of three cryptic phrases. Meanwhile, Andrew watches the Vanderwaal house from outside, and a crime lab analyst looks at evidence from the ice cream factory. 'A' ending: 'A' shreds paper evidence, including a social security card for "Paul Varjak", and uses the scraps to line Tippi's cage.
119	24	"I'm a Good Girl, I Am"	Oliver Goldstick	Oliver Goldstick & Maya Goldsmith	March 17, 2015	1.70
Lesli Stone testifies that Mona once wrote her a letter saying that Alison threatened her life. She also tells the jury about her suspicions of the other girls and Mike Montgomery. Spencer and Emily look for a way to confirm Alison's alibi. They track down a girl named Kendra who hid in the park on Thanksgiving while she waited out a bad drug trip. Alison's lawyer speaks with Kendra, but decides she won't be a reliable or effective witness. 'A' mails a severed cow tongue to the Montgomery house. Ezra gets Mike out of town by bringing him to his cabin, but Caleb accosts them when they arrive. He urges Mike to testify. Ezra argues that Mike (16) is too young to make that decision. Mike steals Ezra's car, but his drive home is interrupted when an arrow pierces his windshield. Caleb and Ezra run through a Pathfinder Scout camp, dodging more arrows before finding Mike tied to a tetherball pole. They tell Detective Tanner what happened, but she doesn't take them seriously. Andrew is jealous that Aria is asking favors of Ezra, but he fails to be there for her when she needs his help. Aria looks at Andrew's yearbook application and is amused to learn that he was a Pathfinder Scout. Hanna and Alison find creative ways of exchanging information, going so far as to injure themselves so they can talk in the jail's infirmary. They pass a note back and forth containing the three phrases from Mona's bedroom. Toby is unsatisfied with the level of responsibility that is being asked of him at the police station. Spencer hints at her recent infidelity, and Toby decides to get his priorities straight before he loses her for good. Alison takes the witness stand. Her lawyer demonstrates that she has limited strength in her right arm due to a childhood injury, while Mona's killer had no such limitation. The prosecutor then brings up an archery competition that Alison won as a child. Her ability to finesse a bow and arrow seems to prove that her arm injury is just another fabrication. Alison later confesses to her lawyer that her archery win was illegitimate. The jury finds Alison guilty, and the rest of the liars are arrested as accessories. 'A' ending: 'A' uses dolls to act out a scene where a prison van drives to a castle.
120	25	"Welcome to the Dollhouse"	Ron Lagomarsino	I. Marlene King	March 24, 2015	2.65
Aria, Hanna, Spencer, and Emily are headed to jail when their van comes to an abrupt stop. 'A' knocks out the driver and gasses the liars, rendering them unconscious. They wake up in their beds, but this isn't home. Frames are missing their photos, windows open to walls of dirt, and cameras watch from the ceilings. The girls reconvene in a shared hallway where a disembodied voice directs them to a re-creation of Alison's living room. Sitting at the piano is Mona Vanderwaal, wearing yellow and claiming to be Alison. She brings the girls to a child's playroom where they receive invitations to "prom." Hanna tries to incite a prison break, and a loud siren begins to wail. It doesn't quiet until everyone returns to their rooms. Peter and Veronica seek answers from Alison, who tells them that 'A' is back. Without police support, The Hastings work with Caleb, Toby, and Ezra to conduct an independent search. Andrew remotely listens in on their conversations. At night, Mona explains that the dollhouse experiences short power outages on a consistent schedule. A long hallway has a vault on one end and an exit on the other, but neither is accessible within the time limit. Anyone caught outside of their room will be tortured as punishment. Spencer mentally rearranges the blocks from the playroom to spell "Charles." 'A' gives Mona a gas mask, but doesn't explain why. The girls are forced to decorate for "prom," and Spencer and Mona are strangely enthusiastic. They rattle off a list of materials, secretly planning to build a device that will shut off the building's power. They disguise the finished product as a camera for Aria. Caleb offers Detective Tanner his expertise in exchange for access to the PD's resources. He locates the missing van at Campbell Farm where the police find 'A's lair. They see footage of the girls, including Mona, in the dollhouse. The girls attend "prom" in dresses provided to them by 'A'. Spencer lures "Charles" out of the shadows, Aria triggers the power outage, and the girls run. Spencer goes to 'A's vault and finds a collection of childhood memories, including a video of Mrs. DiLaurentis, two young boys, and a baby girl. 'A' finds Spencer, but when Mona shows up, they disappear. The girls make it outside, only to find themselves surrounded by an electric fence and miles of forest.

== Specials ==
Special no.	Title	Narrator(s)	Aired between	Original air date	U.S. viewers (million)
1	"We Love You to DeAth"	The Cast of Pretty Little Liars	"Taking This One to the Grave" "How the 'A' Stole Christmas"	October 21, 2014	1.30
Troian Bellisario, Ashley Benson, Lucy Hale, Shay Mitchell and Sasha Pieterse sit down to answer fans burning questions about the show, while Tyler Blackburn, Ian Harding, Janel Parrish, Keegan Allen and Pretty Little Liars crew members sit down to give insiders a glimpse at the behind the scenes workings of the show. It wouldn't be Halloween, or the show, if it didn't include some of "A's" victims in a "Dearly Departed"-themed segment with interviews from those who met a deadly end, such as Bianca Lawson ("Maya St. Germain"), Ryan Merriman ("Ian Thomas") and Bryce Johnson ("Det. Darren Wilden"). Also the Pretty Little Liars fans weigh in on their favorite OMG moments and what the show has meant to them. And everyone has a theory on who they think is "A!"

== Production ==
=== Development ===
The show was renewed for a fifth season on March 26, 2013, while in its third season. I. Marlene King announced on Twitter that the fifth season would contain 25 episodes, including a Christmas special instead of a Halloween episode, which the last three seasons have had. Right before the season five premiere aired, on June 10, 2014, the series was renewed for two additional seasons through season 6 and 7, making the show ABC Family's longest running original series.

On October 13, 2014, it was announced that the special Christmas episode would air as part of ABC Family's "25 Days of Christmas" programming event on December 9, 2014. ABC Family announced that they would air a special behind-the-scenes halloween episode where the cast of Pretty Little Liars would be interviewed and answering questions from fans. It was announced that the show would return with its winter premiere and remaining 12 episodes, which began airing on January 6, 2015.

=== Casting ===
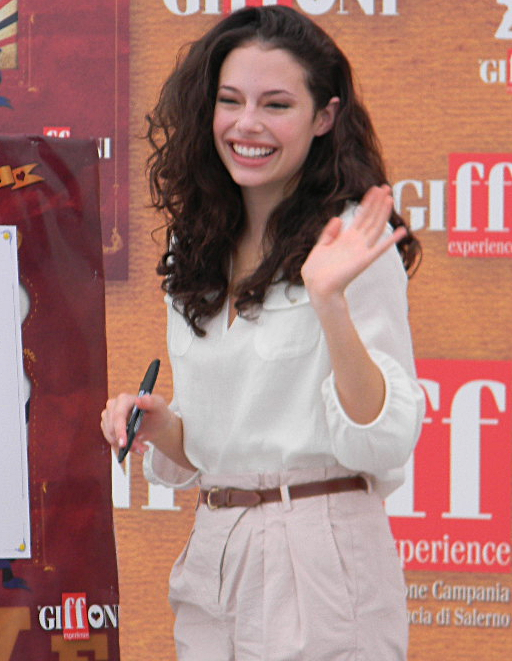
Chloe Bridges was cast as Sydney for the fifth season.

The fifth season had nine roles receiving star billing, with all of them returning from the previous season, seven of which was part of the original cast from the first season. The season saw the four protagonists of the series continue the roles. Troian Bellisario played Spencer Hastings, who struggles with family drama. Ashley Benson continued her role as Hanna Marin, whom finds herself in an identity crisis as a result of Alison's return. Lucy Hale played Aria Montgomery who volunteers to work at Radley Sanitarium in addition to build up her relationship with Ezra. Shay Mitchell portrayed Emily Fields who is affected the most of Alison's return, which makes her confront her feelings towards Ali. Sasha Pieterse returned as Alison DiLaurentis, who moves back home after being presumably dead the last two years, which makes her the attention of the town. Janel Parrish played Mona Vanderwaal, who starts a group against Alison. Tyler Blackburn returned to the series as Caleb Rivers after playing the same character on Ravenswood, while Ian Harding continued his role as Ezra Fitz who is almost killed after being shot in the abdomen by Shana. In addition, Laura Leighton played Ashley Marin, Hanna's mom.

On March 12, 2014, it was announced that Tyler Blackburn would be returning as a series regular on the show after leaving halfway through the fourth season for the sister show; Ravenswood, and would return in the 100th episode. It was reported that in the season premiere, a beloved character would be in great danger as of the casting of a paramedic and two surgeons for the first episode. It was reported that Kenneth DiLaurentis would be returning, King said "Her father comes home and wants to take her with him". On April 3, 2014, it was reported that Chloe Bridges was cast as Sydney, the newest member on the swim team who would befriend Shay Mitchell's character Emily. She appeared in multiple episodes, the first being the third episode.

Tammin Sursok was reported to return to the show in the 100th episode. Her character hadn't been seen since the ninth episode of season four. TVLine reported on June 26, 2014, that Mona's mother, Leona, was going to be introduced in the summer finale, and was going to be played by Sydney Penny. On August 5, 2014, it was announced that Will Bradley was cast as Johnny Raymond, a new painter who would be spending some time with the character Spencer Hastings. He first appeared in the 15th episode. Author of the book series creator, Sara Shepard was announced to appear the show as the news reporter in the 24th episode, following her appearance in the first season episode "The Homecoming Hangover" as the Rosewood High School substitute teacher.

== Broadcast ==
In Australia, the season premiered on Fox8 on June 13, 2014. The second part premiered on January 9, 2015. In the United Kingdom, the first part was released on Netflix on January 1, 2015, with new episodes streaming from the day after it airs in the US.

== Reception ==
=== Critical reception ===
The season premiere was down from the previous premiere, and down from the season four finale "'A' Is for Answers", with a 1.1 at the target 18–49 demographic and 2.72 total viewers. On Rotten Tomatoes the fifth season got a rating of 80% fresh based on 5 reviews.

=== Live + SD ratings ===
No. in series	No. in season	Episode	Air date	Time slot (EST)	Rating/Share (18–49)	Viewers (m)	Rank (18-49)
96	1	"Escape from New York"	June 10, 2014	Tuesdays; 8:00 p.m.	1.1	2.72	1
97	2	"Whirly Girlie"	June 17, 2014	Tuesdays; 8:00 p.m.	0.9	2.16	15
98	3	"Surfing the Aftershocks"	June 24, 2014	Tuesdays; 8:00 p.m.	1.0	2.28	4
99	4	"Thrown from the Ride"	July 1, 2014	Tuesdays; 8:00 p.m.	0.9	2.13	14
100	5	"Miss Me x 100"	July 8, 2014	Tuesdays; 8:00 p.m.	1.0	2.25	10
101	6	"Run, Ali, Run"	July 15, 2014	Tuesdays; 8:00 p.m.	1.0	2.13	8
102	7	"The Silence of E. Lamb"	July 22, 2014	Tuesdays; 8:00 p.m.	1.0	2.06	8
103	8	"Scream for Me"	July 29, 2014	Tuesdays; 8:00 p.m.	0.8	1.80	16
104	9	"March of Crimes"	August 5, 2014	Tuesdays; 8:00 p.m.	0.9	2.05	7
105	10	"A Dark Ali"	August 12, 2014	Tuesdays; 8:00 p.m.	0.9	2.05	13
106	11	"No One Here Can Love or Understand Me"	August 19, 2014	Tuesdays; 8:00 p.m.	0.8	1.80	11
107	12	"Taking This One to the Grave"	August 26, 2014	Tuesdays; 8:00 p.m.	1.0	2.29	4
108	13	"How the 'A' Stole Christmas"	December 9, 2014	Tuesdays; 8:00 p.m.	0.9	2.09	11
109	14	"Through a Glass, Darkly"	January 6, 2015	Tuesdays; 8:00 p.m.	1.0	2.01	7
110	15	"Fresh Meat"	January 13, 2015	Tuesdays; 8:00 p.m.	0.9	2.02	7
111	16	"Over a Barrel"	January 20, 2015	Tuesdays; 8:00 p.m.	0.7	1.72	14
112	17	"The Bin of Sin"	January 27, 2015	Tuesdays; 8:00 p.m.	0.9	2.00	7
113	18	"Oh, What Hard Luck Stories They All Hand Me"	February 3, 2015	Tuesdays; 8:00 p.m.	0.8	1.80	11
114	19	"Out, Damned Spot"	February 10, 2015	Tuesdays; 8:00 p.m.	0.8	1.77	10
115	20	"Pretty Isn't the Point"	February 17, 2015	Tuesdays; 8:00 p.m.	0.9	2.05	11
116	21	"Bloody Hell"	February 24, 2015	Tuesdays; 8:00 p.m.	0.7	1.58	12
117	22	"To Plea or Not to Plea"	March 3, 2015	Tuesdays; 8:00 p.m.	0.7	1.49	18
118	23	"The Melody Lingers On"	March 10, 2015	Tuesdays; 8:00 p.m.	0.9	1.74	8
119	24	"I'm a Good Girl, I Am"	March 17, 2015	Tuesdays; 8:00 p.m.	0.9	1.70	8
120	25	"Welcome to the Dollhouse"	March 24, 2015	Tuesdays; 8:00 p.m.	1.3	2.65	1

== DVD release ==
The Complete Fifth Season
Set details			Special features
25 episodes; 1100 minutes (Region 1); 1070 minutes (Region 2); 1050 minutes (Region 4); 6-disc set; 1.85:1 aspect ratio; Languages: English (Dolby Digital 2.0 Surround); Subtitles: English, French and Spanish (Region 1); English, Spanish, Danish, French, Arabic, Dutch, Norwegian, Swedish, Finnish, English for the Hearing Impaired (Regions 2 and 4)			Deleted scenes; "Good Girls, Bad Lies: The Stronger PLLs"; "Pretty Little Liars: The Guys Are Back!"; "Celebrating a Pretty 100th"; "Christmas in Rosewood: Designing the Ice Ball"; We Love You to DeAth - Fan Appreciation Episode
Release dates			Deleted scenes; "Good Girls, Bad Lies: The Stronger PLLs"; "Pretty Little Liars: The Guys Are Back!"; "Celebrating a Pretty 100th"; "Christmas in Rosewood: Designing the Ice Ball"; We Love You to DeAth - Fan Appreciation Episode
United States	United Kingdom	Australia	Deleted scenes; "Good Girls, Bad Lies: The Stronger PLLs"; "Pretty Little Liars: The Guys Are Back!"; "Celebrating a Pretty 100th"; "Christmas in Rosewood: Designing the Ice Ball"; We Love You to DeAth - Fan Appreciation Episode
June 2, 2015	July 15, 2015	—N/a	Deleted scenes; "Good Girls, Bad Lies: The Stronger PLLs"; "Pretty Little Liars: The Guys Are Back!"; "Celebrating a Pretty 100th"; "Christmas in Rosewood: Designing the Ice Ball"; We Love You to DeAth - Fan Appreciation Episode
