= How the 'A' Stole Christmas =

- Pretty Little Liars episode
- Episode no.: Season 5 Episode 13
- Directed by: I. Marlene King
- Written by: I. Marlene King and Kyle Bown
- Original air date: December 9, 2014
- Running time: 43 minutes

Guest appearances
- Andrea Parker as Jessica DiLaurentis; Lindsey Shaw as Paige McCullers; Keegan Allen as Toby Cavanaugh; Vanessa Ray as CeCe Drake; Chloe Bridges as Sydney Driscoll; Brendan Robinson as Lucas Gottesman; Tammin Sursok as Jenna Marshall; Sean Faris as Gabriel Holbrook; Melanie Moreno as Cindy; Monica Moreno as Mindy

Episode chronology
← Previous "Taking This One to the Grave"	Next → "Through a Glass, Darkly"
- Pretty Little Liars season 5

"How the 'A' Stole Christmas" is the thirteenth episode of the fifth season and 108th episode overall of the mystery drama television series Pretty Little Liars, which aired on December 9, 2014, on the cable network ABC Family. The episode was the series' first Christmas special and aired as part of the programming block 25 Days of Christmas. It was directed by I. Marlene King and co-written by King and Kyle Bown.

"How the 'A' Stole Christmas" yielded 2.09 million viewers, making it the Holiday special with the lowest viewership of the series. The episode received positive reviews, with Janel Parrish's performance as "Ghost Mona" receiving widespread acclaim; further praise was directed toward its themes of grief, nostalgia, and memory, as well as its blend of camp and horror.

== Plot ==
As Spencer (Troian Bellisario), Aria (Lucy Hale), Hanna (Ashley Benson), Emily (Shay Mitchell) do Christmas shopping, they receive a snow globe from "A", saying "A takes a holiday, you should too." They then receive a letter and a map showing the inside of Ali's house, given to them by Mona.

Alison (Sasha Pieterse) is at home sleeping when she is visited by the ghosts of her mother (Andrea Parker) and Mona (Janel Parrish) in her dreams. Mona shows Alison a flashback of a young Alison finding two Christmas presents hidden in their piano. The present is two yellow dresses but Jessica makes her swear that she only found one.

The Liars arrive at the Dilaurentis' Ice Ball with a plan to find evidence on Alison. Lucas, Paige, Caleb, and Ezra are all assisting them. As they are dancing, Alison makes a grand entrance, along with four masked girls. Hanna and Spencer leave the Ice Ball and go to Alison's to search for clues, while an unknown figure in a white cloak is seen lurking around the Ice Ball. Back at the Ice Ball, Aria spots Ali kissing a man in a Santa suit and tells Emily. Aria then discovers that the man is Detective Holbrook. Alison heads into the ice mirror maze and is followed by the white cloaked figure. Alison stops at a mirror and notices the figure watching her. The figure is revealed to be CeCe Drake (Vanessa Ray), who greets Alison with a Merry Christmas. CeCe gives Alison a bottle of specially made perfume named "Alison" and comforts her about her first Christmas without Jessica. Two of the masked girls that arrived with Alison lure Emily into a room and reveal themselves as Jenna (Tammin Sursok) and Sydney (Chloe Bridges). Jenna reveals that she accepted Alison's offer to be her friend after having denied it many years ago which resulted in their feud. Jenna and Sydney believe that Alison killed Mona. After this, Caleb notices what looks like Alison and CeCe, whose identity they don't know, leaving the ball. Caleb and Ezra distract Holbrook, while Aria, Emily, Lucas and Paige corner Alison and CeCe, who reveal themselves as Cindy and Mindy in masks and wigs, as well as being the other two girls who showed up with Alison.

As Hanna and Spencer look around Ali's house, Hanna finds another of Ali's fake passports for if she needs to leave town quickly along with a letter that Bethany wrote to Ali, proving Ali lured Bethany to Rosewood the weekend she was killed. Spencer also finds out that Ali was communicating with someone through the newspaper's personal ads. Toby, who has been keeping lookout for Spencer and Hanna from a window, gets a call from Caleb who says Ali left the party early. "A" then shows up at Ali's house with a knife, looking for the girls. Caleb tries to warn an oblivious Hanna, but she ends up getting knocked out by "A". Believing they have the proof they need, Hanna and Spencer head to Spencer's to celebrate Christmas with their friends and partners.

Meanwhile, Ali is visited by the last two ghosts- the ghost of the present, and the ghost of the future. In Christmas Future, Alison is deceased. Alison is woken up from the nightmare by Mona, who tells her that it's Christmas. As the Liars celebrate Christmas, Ali is seen looking at them, alone, through a window.

The Liars and their partners hear a noise outside and go out to find a large tree and a lights arranged to say "Merry Christmas, Bitches."

== Production ==
The episode was directed by showrunner I. Marlene King, who also served as a writer alongside Kyle Bown; the episode serves as King's fourth writing credit on the season, and the first directing. The title of the episode was revealed by King as an answer for a fan on the platform Reddit. The table-read for the episode occurred on July 14, 2014. Filming for the episode commenced on July 16 and wrapped on July 25, 2014.

== Reception ==
=== Broadcast and ratings ===
In the United States, "How the 'A' Stole Christmas" was first aired on December 9, 2014, and it achieved a viewership of 2.09 million Americans. The episode garnered a 0.9 rating among adults aged 18–49, according to Nielsen Media Research. This Holiday special is the one with the lowest audience in the series.
