= Melissa Hastings =

- Pretty Little Liars character
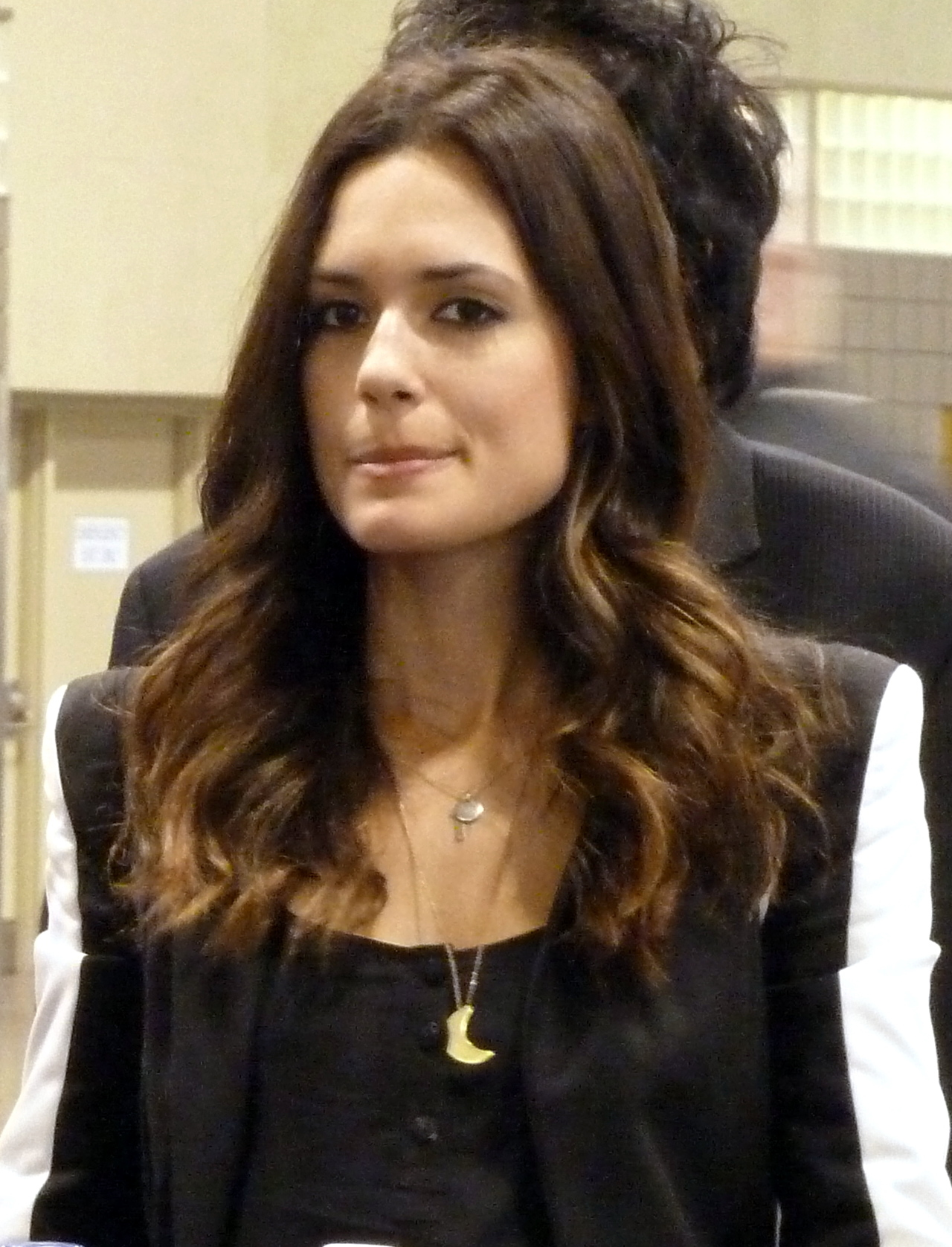
- Torrey DeVitto, who portrays Melissa in the television series.
- First appearance: Novel: Pretty Little Liars (2006) Television: "Pilot" (2010)
- Last appearance: Novel: Vicious (2014) Television: "Till Death Do Us Part" (2017)
- Created by: Sara Shepard
- Portrayed by: Torrey DeVitto
- Adapted by: I. Marlene King

In-universe information
- Full name: Melissa Josephine Hastings
- Aliases: Television: "A"; The Queen of Hearts; The Black Swan
- Nickname: Maleficent (television)
- Occupation: Television: "A" (formerly); Novel: Funds raiser
- Family: General: Peter Hastings (father); Veronica Hastings (mother); Novel: Spencer Hastings (sister); Alison DiLaurentis (half-sister); Courtney DiLaurentis (half-sister); Television: Spencer Hastings (paternal half-sister); Alex Drake (paternal half-sister); Jason DiLaurentis (paternal half-brother)
- Spouse: Ian Thomas (deceased)
- Significant others: Novel: Ian Thomas (ex-boyfriend); Wren Kingston (ex-fiancé); Darren Wilden (fiancé); Television: Wren Kingston (ex-fiancé); Jason DiLaurentis (Note: Although Jason and Melissa are half-siblings, they didn't know that when they kissed. The truth only came out shortly after.) (brief flirt); Garrett Reynolds (ex-boyfriend)
- Relatives: Novel: Daniel Hastings (maternal uncle); Genevieve Hastings (maternal aunt); Jonathan Hastings (cousin); Smith Hastings (cousin); Penelope Hastings (paternal aunt); Duncan Hastings (great-great-great grandfather); Nana Hastings (paternal grandmother)
- Nationality: American
- Alma mater: University of Pennsylvania
- Residence: Rosewood, Pennsylvania (formerly); London, England (currently)
- Seasons: 1–7
- Status: Alive

Melissa Hastings is a fictional character in the Pretty Little Liars franchise. Created in 2006 by Sara Shepard for the book series, the character was later reworked by I. Marlene King, the developer of the television series, in which she is portrayed by Torrey DeVitto. An antiheroine, Melissa is sister to protagonist Spencer Hastings, and the daughter of Peter and Veronica Hastings. She is a fierce woman who does everything to succeed in her life goals. In print, she is a guest character, while on screen Melissa has a much bigger presence in the story.

== Character in print ==
Melissa has had recurring appearances in most of the Pretty Little Liars novels, starting with the 2006 homonymous book. She also appeared in the 2012 companion novel Pretty Little Secrets. She is the daughter of Peter and Veronica Hastings, sister of Spencer Hastings, and half-sister to the twins Alison and Courtney DiLaurentis, which are the result of an affair her father Peter had with the twins' mother Jessica. Melissa attended high school at Rosewood Day School and graduated from the University of Pennsylvania. According to Spencer's description of Melissa, she closely resembles Mrs. Hastings with her chin-length ash blonde hair and blue eyes; Spencer sarcastically described her sister as "a perfect little clone." Melissa has an uptight, simpering personality to match her lack of style.

=== Relationships ===
- Spencer Hastings: Throughout the course of the story, Melissa and Spencer had an incredibly unloving sister relation. The two were rivals for parental attention and success, and Melissa often won the fight, which angered Spencer. The sisters' iterations broke up after a traumatic memory loss Spencer had in their childhood. An armed robber accosted the family during an outing and Spencer, having lost all memory of the experience, was never the same since that day. Their parents apparently worried about her so much that Melissa had to miss several competitions that year. Thus, the rivalry for their parents' attention began. When Melissa finds out that Spencer plagiarized her AP Econ essay and got nominated for the Golden Orchid as a result, she is enraged, and the two get involved in an argument turned violent. Spencer pushes her down the stairs, and she suffers a broken arm. Their parents force them to spend time together at their grandmother's beach house in an attempt to reconcile their relationship, but it only has moderate, short-lived success. At one point Spencer even suspects Melissa of being Alison's killer. After the Poconos house fire, the two reconciled and decided to put their differences aside.
- Ian Thomas: During their high school years, Ian and Melissa were a couple and she believed that he was her soulmate. After she discovered that Ian and her sister kissed, as well as him and Alison, she still was by his side and never believed that he was guilty of anything. The not-knowing of his whereabouts in the night Alison disappeared jeopardized their relationship.
- Wren Kingston: Melissa's second serious boyfriend and eventually fiancée. They were planning to move in to the townhouse her parents purchased. While Melissa seemed to love him, Wren didn't seem to feel the same level of affection, which caused him to prefer and kiss Spencer and jeopardize his engagement with Melissa. However, he eventually hooked up again with Melissa, who eventually made sure that he would be out of both of their lives for good. Wren and Spencer later started dating again, with Melissa's blessing.
- Jason DiLaurentis: The two had a brief casual relationship in which Melissa didn't care for him the way he did for her. As a way to get closer, Ian revealed to Melissa the secret about the DiLaurentis twins and asked for her to keep it a secret between them, which she did.
- Darren Wilden: Shortly after the fire in the Poconos house, Melissa and Wilden started dating and eventually he proposed to her. Spencer likes Melissa's relationship with Wilden, which strengthened their sister bond.

=== Storylines ===
Melissa and Spencer are rivals sisters who compete for their parents' recognition and Melissa appears to be the favored child who can do no wrong. She always seems to one-up Spencer in everything from academic achievements to extracurricular actives. As she is about five-six years older than Spencer, she's essentially accomplished everything Spencer has done in high school. Problems occur when she begins to feel attracted to Melissa's new boyfriend, Wren Kingston, when he is introduced to the family. "A" eventually reveals to Melissa that Spencer is dating. Wren dumps Spencer while he is back hooking up with Melissa, and Melissa eventually dumps him, removing him for her and her sister's life for good. Ian returns from California and starts working as a field hockey coach, in Spencer's team, which allows Melissa to pursue him again. "A" reveals to Melissa that Spencer stole her essay for the Golden Orchid competition, but the family keeps quiet to protect their reputation. Melissa and Spencer grow closer, and Spencer confesses that she kissed Ian, and that he and Alison were secretly dating. Spencer and Melissa's feud continues anyway after Melissa confronts Spencer about seeing Ian behind her back, which Spencer denies. Spencer and Mona eventually start suspecting that Melissa may have killed Alison. Spencer and Mona discover a note from "A" and suspect that Melissa killed Alison because she was jealous of her relationship with Ian. Mona, Spencer and their friends decide to turn Melissa in, but eventually Mona is revealed to be "A" and the girls stop suspecting Melissa.

When Courtney DiLaurentis, Alison's twin sister, returns Melissa immediately has a bad feeling about her. Jason told her everything about the sisters a while ago and none of the stories matched up - Courtney claims that her and Alison were best friends who shared everything whilst Jason says they despised each other and the reason Courtney is in a mental clinic is because she attempted to strangle Alison. Melissa investigates Courtney, but gets too close to the truth and is kidnapped by Courtney. She wakes up bound and gagged in a wardrobe next to Ian's dead body, Courtney didn't have time to kill her then, but she was going to kill her later. The Liars were trapped inside the house by Courtney and discovered that Courtney was in fact Alison, who murdered the real Courtney after a case of mistaken identity. The house is set on fire and the Liars stumble upon Melissa in the wardrobe and free her, they all then manage to escape.

Throughout the rest of the books, Melissa becomes engaged to Darren Wilden and her and Spencer become closer. When Spencer's parents practically abandon her, Melissa supports Spencer throughout her hard time and tries to be a good sister.

== Character on screen ==
=== Casting ===
The Hollywood Reporter noted that Torrey DeVitto and Sasha Pieterse landed recurring roles in the pilot. The Alloy Entertainment website later confirmed that Pieterse would be playing Alison DiLaurentis and DeVitto would portray Melissa Hastings.

=== Storylines ===
In the show, Melissa's role is much greater and more mysterious. She has been accused of being "A" multiple times, and has held grudges against the Liars, yet has seemingly displayed affectionate and overprotective behavior towards her sister.

==== Season 1 ====
Melissa is first mentioned in the Pilot by Hanna Marin and her half-sister Spencer Hastings when they meet at the mall. The character makes her first official appearance in the same episode, commending Spencer for her efforts in renovating their barn. Melissa subsequently informs her sister that she alongside her fiancé, Wren Kingston, will be moving into the shed. This announcement angers Spencer because their parents agreed for her to move in instead. Wren later questions his sister-in-law if she's doing okay but Spencer storms out. Kingston proceeds to divulge Melissa that her sister doesn't seem too happy with them moving to the barn, but she assures him she'll get over it. Afterwards, Melissa reappears in a flashback with her ex-boyfriend, Ian Thomas, hanging out at the Hastings residence. Former next-door neighbor Alison DiLaurentis was present in the moment as well. Ali discloses to Melissa that her sister has something to declare, which Spencer abruptly disregards. Melissa and Ian proceed to leave.

During "The Jenna Thing", Melissa, Wren, Peter and Spencer go out to dinner. When Spencer orders a vodka soda, Melissa proclaims the waitress she's joking and simultaneously orders the same drink as their father. In the course of her meal, Melissa proceeds to brag that she already became President of something during her first week in class. Later that night, she passes by Spencer's room and catches her exchanging a kiss with Wren. She sees them through an oval mirror but avoids confrontation. The following morning she calls off the wedding and Wren moves out of the shed.

In "There's No Place Like Homecoming", Spencer steals Melissa's Russian History paper from when she attended high school. The piece impresses Spencer's teacher, who later submits it to an essay contest. Melissa eventually reads it and plans a small vendetta against her sister. She was asked to chaperone Spencer's homecoming dance, and uses the opportunity to drive a wedge between her relationship with Alex. Melissa maliciously states to him that the only reason Spencer agreed to date him was to anger their father. She additionally mocks his economic background and the fact that he works at a club and attends a lesser school than Rosewood High. Alex leaves, and Spencer suspects her sister's hand in it, though she's unaware of what was precisely said. During the homecoming king and queen announcement, Melissa unctuously uses the platform to mention that she was crowned queen when she was a student six years prior. It is revealed through flashbacks that when Melissa dated Ian Thomas, Spencer made out with him once, though Melissa never found out. Later, when Ian returns to Rosewood, Spencer tried mending her relationship with Melissa by setting them up together for coffee. Melissa at first refuses because he broke her heart and she was still getting over Wren, but with Spencer's nudge, she agrees to meet Thomas. One coffee date immediately turns into something more serious as it seems the two have picked up where they left off. This leads to Melissa making peace with her sister, causing them to grow closer and behave kindly towards one another.

Melissa and Spencer's sisterly bond remains steady when Melissa comforts her after Hanna is admitted to the hospital after getting hit by a car, during "Moments Later". Later at the Hastings residence, Ian invites Aria Montgomery and Spencer outside to drink a toast of champagne. Spencer demands Thomas an explanation as to what they were celebrating and why he had canceled varsity practice that day. Ian admits he and Melissa have eloped!

In "Know Your Frenemies", Melissa and Ian return from their honeymoon. The episode opens in the midst of the night with the two of them whispering about a secret. A few days afterwards, Melissa returns from shopping, and drops a bag. Spencer picks it up, discovering an ovulation test. Melissa confesses to sister that she is trying to start a family. Ian overhears and seems a bit unhappy, stating they "planned to keep it a secret." Melissa assures her husband that Spencer is capable of withholding information. Thomas replies, "I know she can", alluding to the fact that Melissa is still in the dark about the kiss that occurred between her husband and sister.

During a later episode, Melissa announces a pregnancy. Her relationship with Spencer takes a turn for the worse when Spencer comes out with her beliefs about Ian's guilt, although Ian doesn't outwardly display anger in front of the Hastings clan. Melissa accuses her sister of being selfish, whilst Spencer argues that not every deed Melissa does takes Spencer's best interests into account. Spencer eventually brings up as proof of Ian's culpability the fact that Thomas stayed at the Hilton Resort, the very same location Ali was staying at just before she disappeared. Melissa clarifies to Spencer that she stayed at the resort with Ian when she was getting a secret abortion. She further explains the abortion never took place, as she miscarried. Melissa adds that losing a child made the follow-up pregnancy much more pivotal. Spencer is simply stunned at her affirmations.

When Melissa, Ian, and Spencer are chatting with Mrs. Ackard at the Rosewood Founder's Festival during "Monsters in the End", the Hilton Resort is brought up by Ackard, and based on Melissa's response, it seems that her and Ian stayed in separate rooms while being there. Spencer finds the situation incredibly suspicious, since she brought up the fact that Ian lingered the Hilton after being annoyed towards the attention paid to her as a person of interest.

During "For Whom the Bell Tools", Spencer drives Melissa home from the church, where she had been making plans for the christening of her unborn child. On the way, their car crashes, and the siblings are taken to a hospital. Melissa is kept longer, as her fetus needs to be monitored carefully, though it turns out to be fine. Veronica and Spencer try to get in touch with Ian to let him know what happened to his wife, but Thomas is more preoccupied in hiding his involvement with Alison before she died, so he opts to ignore their messages instead. Spencer returns to the church to search for Melissa's phone, since she had left it there but finds her brother-in-law instead. A battle ensues between the two of them, during which Thomas attempts to murder Spencer. However, an anonymous hooded figure arrives in time to push him from the bell tower. The person responsible for his fall was later divulged to be an alive Alison, who reveals in A is for Answers that she witnessed her ex-boyfriend stumble away afterwards.

==== Season 2 ====
Throughout this season, Melissa is completely distraught when Ian mysteriously disappears. At first, she, like most citizens in Rosewood, believe Ian to be a missing person and distrusts Spencer's story. After a while, she reveals to Spencer that she doubts this, because he left after they had planned to name their child Taylor. She softens a bit towards Spencer, but is later spotted doing mysterious activities and dodging Spencer from her whereabouts. Spencer discovers someone claiming to be Thomas texting Melissa, and she suspects that her sister is secretly keeping him alive. Spencer asks her sister to protect her over Ian, but Melissa snaps back angrily. The Liars later find out she had been secretly meeting with Wren after watching her take something from Kingston in the Hastings' parking lot. Spencer correctly guesses the merchandise to be pain killers for Ian. In the meantime, Melissa removes her ring by the toaster one day when her fingers feel swollen from the pregnancy. Spencer pawns the object with the intention of returning it to her sister. However, "A" buys it back before Spencer returns to the pawn shop. Later, Melissa is seen looking around the house for Ian's passport and claims it's for the insurance company. However, Spencer scopes out the barn when Melissa is showering and finds a suitcase packed with items for Ian. The belongings consist of clothes, pain killers and Thomas' passport. Spencer enlists Wren's help to prevent her sister from helping Ian flee the country. When Melissa goes to visit Ian at his barn hideout with Wren (with the Liars secretly following behind), she stumbles upon her husband sitting dead with a bullet wound, beside a gun and a suicide letter. Melissa reacts in total agony, and Spencer comes out of her hiding place to comfort her. Melissa is silent and withdrawn after this, so Spencer convinces her parents to stage a funeral for Ian in order to give her sister closure. Spencer tries to reason with her sister, but Melissa refuses making amends. After the memorial, Melissa apologizes for picking Ian over Spencer. Just as she is about to reveal something to her sister, Spencer pulls out Ian's phone, which had been planted by "A" in her purse. Melissa is once more beyond livid, accusing Spencer of posing as Ian and vows to never forgive her.

During "Never Letting Go", Melissa goes on a much needed vacation. Her father mentions to Spencer that she could have gone as well, meaning that Melissa most likely didn't tell her parents about the feud that ensued between the two of them.

In later episodes, Melissa is not seen in Rosewood, but is mentioned occasionally.

During the flashback-centered episode "The First Secret", Melissa and Ian were in the initial stage of their romance. She seems oblivious to Alison's attempts at stealing her boyfriend, though she does kiss Ian just as Alison is trying to strike up a conversation with him at Noel's Halloween party. There, Ian and Melissa are dressed in couple costumes as Bonnie and Clyde. Earlier in the episode, Melissa is seen helping Spencer with her class presidential nomination speech. When she leaves, Alison accuses Melissa of being insecure and trying to outshine Spencer in the eyes of their parents with her own success.

In "Through Many Dangers, Toils and Snares", Spencer tells Toby that her parents are with Melissa in Philadelphia. She has an irregular heartbeat and is being looked at by specialists.

During "The Blond Leading the Blind", we learn that Melissa was a counselor at a horse-riding camp in 2006.

Through a flashback in "The Naked Truth", we learn that Ali's brother, Jason, once gave Melissa a ride home from Philadelphia and her father caught them kissing in his car. It is then divulged that Peter is Jason's biological father and a product of an affair he once shared with his mother, Jessica DiLaurentis. Veronica confirms that Melissa does not know about this.

In "Breaking the Code", Spencer discloses to Melissa that Jason is their half-brother, and she feels betrayed by their parents. Caleb also sends Hanna a video and orders her to open it as soon as possible. When she does so, the Liars find out who came into Alison's room the night she was murdered. While Garrett, Ian, and Jenna deduce it's Alison, it's really Melissa who runs in yelling "Where is she!?" and the video abruptly ends. Aria, Hanna and Emily Fields want to hand the footage to the authorities but Spencer tells them she needs to confront Melissa first. When Melissa fails to meet Spencer, she is caught with Garrett Reynolds. Nonetheless, Melissa ends up asking Spencer to have a one-o-one chat.

During "Father Knows Best", Melissa and Spencer are seated in the car talking. Melissa divulges to Spencer that she went to see Garrett to talk about Ian. She claims Garrett had been very supportive but she fears having told him too much. Melissa further adds that she was a wreck after noticing that Alison was flirting with Ian and sent her texts ordering her to "back the hell off". At first, Spencer worries that Melissa is "A" but her belief is quickly disproved. They also talk about how Ali might have blackmailed their father and Melissa confirms she doesn't trust Peter. Later in the episode, Spencer finds a gift addressed to her on the table with a note that says "Looking forward to the dance". Melissa quickly dismisses the gift by stating and Spencer deduces their father didn't pay Alison. Nevertheless, Melissa remains insistent that both of their parents have lied before and still are.

In "UnmAsked", Melissa arrives at the Masquerade Ball in Rosewood High clothed as the Black Swan to distract the Liars. She is later amongst the crowd gathered outside Emily's house as the coroners remove Maya's body from the scene.

==== Season 3 ====
During "Kingdom of the Blind", Veronica discloses that Melissa has a dilemma, but it isn't stated what. It was also revealed that for sometime Melissa had been faking a pregnancy due to the fact she had a miscarriage. Melissa had miscarried the day after she found Ian's body.

In "Birds of a Feather", Melissa is accused of being the Black Swan due to significant evidence being found in her closet. She is confronted by Spencer, and admits to having disguised herself as the entity whilst under Mona's orders when she was "A". Mona blackmailed her over the knowledge she had faked a pregnancy since Ian's passing.

During "Misery Loves Company", Byron has a flashback during which Melissa is seen talking to an unknown individual on the phone, out on her patio the night Ali went missing. She yells "Do I need to call 911 to get your attention?" and looks visibly upset and frustrated with the person answering on the other end.

In "What Becomes of the Broken-Hearted", Melissa is making dinner for herself and Spencer, since their parents are in London, when someone knocks on the door. She answers it and is surprised to see Wren. They engage in awkward small talk before she leaves to her barn. Jason later discloses to Emily that on the night his sister went missing, he saw Melissa talking to someone who heavily resembled Alison. However, when he yelled Ali's name, a startled CeCe Drake turned around. Melissa is then seen contacting Spencer to find out where she is, and Wren answers that she has food poisoning.

During "Hot Water", Melissa walks past Spencer's room and notices she's crashing there. She admits that she's tired of covering for her about skipping school, further adding the next time their mother calls she's going to rat on her. Melissa is then seen on her iPad when Spencer returns home from her date with Wren. She questions her sister about her gleeful state and makes a remark about having bought Wren the cologne he put on for their date, before leaving. In the same episode, Emily confronts CeCe about her connection to Melissa and Drake proceeds to divulge that she took a photo of Ali, her and Wilden before disclosing that Melissa wanted the N.A.T. Club videos.

In "Will The Circle Be Unbroken?", Melissa and the principal are looking for Spencer at Rosewood High and asks the Liars if they spotted her. Later in Radley Sanitarium, Melissa is extremely apologetic because she was responsible for looking after Spencer while their parents were out of the country. Melissa admits that it didn't occur to her that Spencer showcased erratic behavior, as she simply assumed her sister was being vile.

During "A dAngerous gAme", Emily glazes at a suspicious looking Melissa entering Jenna Marshall's house. Inside, Melissa and Shana seem to be arguing with Jenna, stating that "they have the tapes". Melissa further informs her "those bitches will be at the lodge at nine". She proceeds to hand Shana a copy of the invitation to Spencer's lodge "party" that's going to take place in Thornhill. The night of the event an unspecified individual sets the house on fire using a copy of the invitation whilst trapping Mona, Hanna, Aria, and Emily inside. It is implied that Melissa was behind the incident. However, it's divulged in "Escape from New York" that Shana was accountable for this incident due to holding a grudge against the Liars for the role they played on Jenna's loss of eyesight.

==== Season 4 ====
In "'A' Is for A-l-i-v-e", Mona mentions to the Liars that Shana and Jenna were afraid of Melissa. She would later show the girls a video of Wilden and Melissa in the Queen of Hearts costumes at the Halloween Train. However, before Melissa's face is shown the video abruptly ends.

During "Turn of the Shoe", the Liars discuss potential candidates who could've attended Darren Wilden's funeral clothed as the Black Widow. They ask Spencer about Melissa's whereabouts and she responds that Melissa is in DC interviewing for an internship. Hanna sarcastically replies "With who? Satan?".

In "Cat's Cradle", Melissa returns to Rosewood and runs into Spencer at The Brew. In a brilliant display of passive aggression they discuss Melissa's interview, her potential position in San Francisco or London, along with Wilden's murder, and the fact that Melissa thinks they both need to get out of town. Later, Hanna finds what seems to be a cast of Melissa's face at Hector Lime's studio. Marin, alongside Aria and Emily, investigate the origins of the Alison Mask. Melissa claims she was questioned by Detective Gabriel Holbrook about Wilden, but doesn't know how helpful she was since she didn't really talk to him after high school.

During "Face Time", Aria and Spencer plant Melissa's face mold inside her suitcase and spy on her. Melissa finds her mask and looks worried. She leaves the house abruptly and Aria and Spencer quickly follow her. Spencer proceeds to confronts Melissa and questions her about the events that took place at the Halloween train. Melissa swears that it was Wilden who tried to harm her and further discloses that her, Jenna and Shana were afraid of Wilden and that she sent them to Thornhill to find out if they were meeting Alison, confirming that Melissa too suspects her former nemesis of being alive. As Spencer continues to press the situation, Melissa explodes and tell her that she has been protecting Spencer since "before it started", further instructing her to let it go.

In "Gamma Zeta Die!", Veronica mentions that Melissa is in London for her internship. Melissa finds the city beautiful but cold, which Spencer thinks is an appropriate comparison to her sister.

After having bumped into Toby in London, Melissa returns to Rosewood in "'A' Is for Answers", surprising Veronica as the police order a warrant to the Hastings house. At the Rosewood Police Department, Holbrook questions Melissa, but she doesn't give much away. In the waiting area of the station, Melissa confesses to her father that she knows who's in Alison's grave, now that it's public knowledge Alison's alive. Melissa reappears in a flashback at the Hilton Head confronting Ian about his inappropriate relationship with Alison, telling Thomas he either dumps her or she calls off their relationship.

==== Season 5 ====
After having arrived home from the Rosewood Police Department in "Escape from New York", Melissa wonders how long Spencer has known about Alison being alive. She believes that Ali is a “walking time bomb” and when she explodes, everyone around her gets hurt. Struggling with what she shared to Peter back at the station, Melissa almost divulges her secret to Veronica, but before she can do so, red and blue lights flash at the window, cutting her off. Later, Melissa informs her father that she wants to tell Holbrook the truth. She adds that when Spencer finds out, she'll have a reason to come home. Finishing his drink, Peter stands, towering over Melissa as he reaches for the bottle of alcohol behind her, and tells Veronica can't find out the truth. He then walks away.

During "Whirly Girlie", Veronica mentions to Spencer that Melissa and Peter are in Philadelphia retrieving Spencer's car which has been impounded. Veronica warns her youngest daughter not to expect any souvenirs from London, because all Melissa "brought back was attitude and secrets".

As Spencer is staring out her bedroom window in "Surfing the Aftershocks", Melissa shows up behind her and warns her not to let the DiLaurentis' catch her spying. Spencer accuses Melissa of thinking that Jason killed his mother, something Melissa does not deny. She wants to know why her sister sent Toby after her to London and Spencer replies he went on his own. Melissa thinks that Spencer bringing Ali back to town safe and sound was a mistake and counsels her to stay away from her neighbor. Spencer reminds Melissa they are both related to parts of Ali's family. Later on, Spencer and Peter talk about the email Jessica sent hours before she died, when Melissa walks in and orders her sister to leave their father alone. As Spencer reaches for the email in Peter's hand, Melissa manages to grab it first. After reading what Jessica tried sending, she rips the piece of paper and proceeds to call Mrs. DiLaurentis crazy, causing Spencer to yell back. Their father suddenly steps in and tells them to stop behaving like toddlers. Melissa suggests to Peter coming clean about her secret, but Peter instantly sends Spencer to her room.

In "Thrown from the Ride", Spencer mentions to Veronica that Melissa wanted to tell her something, but Peter prevented her. Veronica assures Spencer the only thing Melissa has been hiding is that she got back together with Wren. Later on "Miss Me x 100", Veronica discloses to Spencer that she was working with a private investigator and discovered that Peter and Melissa lied about their whereabouts the night Jessica was killed.

Throughout "Run, Ali, Run", Emily finds out from Paige that Melissa is working with Mona and Lucas to fight against Alison's return.

Walking out of her barn in "The Silence of the E. Lamb", Melissa is greeted by Spencer who asks her when she got back, to which Melissa replies "last night". Spencer further questions Melissa about their father's whereabouts and she replies that he's staying at her apartment in London, taking some time for himself. Afterwards, Melissa asks Spencer if anyone had been in the barn lately, to which Spencer divulges the last person to crash there was her sober buddy, prompting Melissa to make a remark on how he was a lousy housekeeper. Spencer informs Melissa that Peter wants to sell the house, and Melissa suggests they should, only for her sister to insist that it's their home. Lifting up a garbage bag, Melissa starts to walk away until Spencer grabs the item and drops it after finding a dead rat in a trap. Shaking her head, Melissa picks up the rat trap and garbage bag, before dropping the animal into a bin and making a snarky comment on how "she needs to wash her hands". Later, as Melissa walks down the stairs after having taken up food to Veronica, Spencer asks if their mother ate anything, to which Melissa answers “just some salad”. Melissa mentions their mother lacked appetite, and Spencer points out that Veronica knows she's more supportive of Peter. Melissa insists she's not taking sides, but Spencer doesn't believe it, reminding her sister that she's letting Peter stay in her apartment. Melissa affirms that the two of them fighting isn't helping anything, and that things are bad enough between Veronica and Peter. Spencer deduces that the tension that's been pitting their family against one another is about Alison, and what really happened to the girl who ended up in her grave. Getting emotional, Melissa asserts Spencer she's right, but that it's "still about love".

In "A Dark Ali", Melissa walks into Spencer's bedroom and asks her if she needs any help as she is crawling around on the floor. Spencer thought Melissa had left the house already but Melissa states she forgot the grocery list. When Melissa wonders if Spencer is looking for something, Spencer tells her she dropped her pen. Spencer questions what Melissa wants, and she replies that Veronica wanted her to try and see if Spencer would like anything special for dinner. As Spencer's phone starts ringing with an incoming call, Melissa picks it up off the floor and hands it to Spencer, telling her to take it, and that she'll wait. As Spencer ends the call, Melissa asks if something is wrong, and instead of answering, Spencer instructs Melissa to tell Veronica that they're out of peanut butter. Later on, Melissa is waiting in the shadows of the kitchen as Spencer tries to sneak into the house. Spencer mentions that she's missing her blue sweater and thought it may have ended up in the barn. Spencer further comments that she saw her sister's computer, and knows that Melissa was looking up flights. After asking if Melissa's either planning a vacation or running away, she questions how that is any of Spencer's business. Her bad-tempered response causes Spencer to reveal that she knows Melissa is helping Mona. Spencer wonders if someone taunted her sister into something she doesn't want to. Unfolding her arms, Melissa explains that she only helped Mona because she wanted Spencer to see that Alison remains a bully. Spencer questions if it's indeed sisterly concern, to which Melissa replies she can't tell her. As Melissa begins to walk off, Spencer comments they can improve upon their genetics and should at least try to resolve their issues. Melissa makes a remark on how "honesty does not come easy" for the Hastings family. Opening one of the great room doors to leave, she suggests Spencer to leave Rosewood, implying it's not a safe place. Near the ending of the episode, Melissa sets up a camera to record a message for Spencer.

Throughout "No One Here Can Love or Understand Me", Melissa leaves a video confession to Spencer, during which she explains having witnessed a fight between her sister and Alison the night she went missing. Melissa had caught a glimpse of Spencer walking back into their barn holding a shovel in her hands. Minutes later, she stumbled upon Bethany Young's unconscious body and deduced the girl was Ali, since they had worn the same clothes. Melissa wasn't able to get a good look of her face, and therefore pushed Bethany to an already open grave, in an attempt to protect Spencer. She proceeded to cover up Young's body with dirt, unbeknownst she was still alive. Through tears, Melissa states that maybe their dad was right in asking her to be quiet, but that she couldn't leave Spencer in the dark. Melissa finally profess her love for Spencer before the recording comes to an end.

In "To Plea or Not to Plea", Melissa arrives at her apartment in London and finds Spencer seated at a table, with her suitcase half packed. Spencer tells her that she's sticking with her original plan to head back to Rosewood, to which Melissa comments she's barely had a chance to see her. She further adds that Veronica went out of her way to track down her friend that works at St. Andrew's, and when Spencer refuses another interview, Melissa comments that it's not like her to run away. Spencer further adds that there's a lot going on with her friends, and Toby. Taking a seat, Melissa asks what's going on with her brother-in-law, and Spencer explains that Toby became a cop to protect her, but now his job is ruining their relationship. Melissa states that relationships run their course and comments that the best part of living in London was starting out her life with a clean slate. Spencer asserts that it must be nice, to which Melissa assures that it could be her future as well. Melissa later offers Spencer a dress and makes a remark on how their relationship should consist of this. Spencer simply looks up to her before sorrowfully pointing out they were never amicable towards one another. Melissa discloses to Spencer that she should have never kept the truth about Bethany Young's death a secret. Spencer asks why she chose to do so, and her sister explains that at first it felt reasonable but it only grew more burdensome over time. Spencer hopes they can start over, before adding there can't be more lies between them. A few days later, Melissa walks out of her bedroom and finds Spencer packed and ready to leave. When Spencer informs that she's going home, explaining that Hanna was arrested because the authorities think she was involved in Mona's murder. Melissa thinks it's best for Spencer to stay in London but Spencer explains that she'd rather be supporting her friend. Spencer then adds that she wants to reschedule her interview and asks Melissa for the number of Veronica's friend. Melissa admits she doesn't know, and explains that Veronica doesn't have a friend at St. Andrew's. Apparently Wren called everyone he knew, in an attempt to grant Spencer a scholarship for Oxford. Melissa reveals their mother found out Alison was offered a plea bargain and part of the deal was to name her accomplice, and they feared it'd be Spencer. Spencer alludes they vowed to never withhold more secrets but Melissa exclaims that she was just trying to protect her. Spencer points out the last time Melissa tried looking out for her, someone ended up dead. Watching Spencer walk out to pick up a cab downstairs, Melissa informs that she was "trying to help”, to which Spencer assures her that she's doing the opposite.

==== Season 6 ====
Shortly after Charlotte DiLaurentis' murder, Melissa returns to Rosewood in "The Gloves Are On", making remarks on how Spencer has developed feelings for Caleb whilst looking for clothes at her barn. Melissa is later seen at the Hastings residence, worrying over a reporter potentially withholding information regarding the confession tape she made her sister about the truth of Bethany Young's murder.

At the end of "Where Somebody Waits for Me", Spencer discovers that Melissa's broken suitcase handle matches the description of the alleged murder weapon. Throughout "We've All Got Baggage", Hanna further fuels the possibility that Melissa could've killed Charlotte by telling Spencer and Caleb how she ran into her at a fashion show in London, years prior to Charlotte's murder. She explains that Melissa spent the entire night drinking and sobbing at a bathroom in order to get over the fact that Charlotte dialed Wren to inform him that his partner had buried Bethany Young. Due to the side-effects of alcohol, Melissa proceeded to grab Hanna's phone and dial Welby to have a word with Charlotte by pretending to be Alison. Hanna got into a physical fight with Melissa and eventually threw the phone at a mirror to prevent hearing Charlotte's voice from the other end. A few days later, Emily visits the Two Crows diner and discovers the missing part from Melissa's suitcase, but is nearly run over by a car that steals the weapon.

In "Burn This", Spencer asks her father if he can make sure Melissa contacts her because her sister hasn't been answering her calls. Peter divulges that Melissa left for London because the office needed her back, causing Spencer to ask why she'd leave right before the election. He tells her that she should stop worrying about Melissa and think about how she's going to help Veronica win the state senator elections. Later that day, Emily stumbles upon an auto shop that appears to be fixing the same car that almost ran her over. After asking if anyone had brought in a dark gray SUV, one of the mechanics insists they can't help her. Emily eventually comes backs to snoop around and lifts up a tarp covering a car. She sees paint and takes a picture of it before the same mechanic she had confronted earlier demands to know why she was there again. Emily informs him the car she was talking about matches the one she was investigating and asks if he knew who drove it the night before. The man replies "maybe I lent it to a friend, I can't remember". Emily holds up a picture of Melissa and asks if she was his friend. The mechanic denies, before looking back at the other guys and ordering Emily to leave. The next day, Spencer once more confronts her father at their home, accusing him of protecting Melissa of Charlotte's murder. Peter discloses to his youngest daughter that Melissa didn't kill anyone but was blackmailed right before Charlotte's court hearing. Melissa started getting threatening messages by an anonymous individual who claimed to have a copy of the video confession she once made Spencer, in regards to the truth about Bethany Young's murder. Spencer doesn't buy her father's excuse, but Peter explains she was told to drop money off at a disclosed location or the video would be released. He adds that's why Melissa came back to Rosewood in secret, dropped off the cash and hoped it'd go away. Nonetheless, Charlotte turned up dead. Spencer asks why she'd flee if she had nothing to do with her former tormentor's homicide, causing Peter to assert she got spooked. Spencer asks why he didn't instruct Melissa to report the situation to the authorities, but he states they feared the police wouldn't believe Melissa's story. At the end of the episode, we see the mechanic that interacted with Emily wiping paint off the SUV, before reaching into the car and finding an envelope containing several hundred dollars.

==== Season 7 ====
During "Till Death Do Us Part", a year has passed since A.D. concluded their reign and discovered that Mona was accountable for Charlotte's homicide. Spencer has rekindled her relationship with Melissa, and the two sisters are hanging out together at a stable earlier in the episode. Melissa is trying to convince Spencer to give her the barn, when all of a sudden, Toby approaches with luggage. Later that night, the Liars and their respective partners are gathered at the Lost Woods Resort for a joint bachelor/bachelorette party. An elusive figure in a black hoodie is watching them through the bushes while they're eating dinner. Suddenly, the anonymous entity turns around and is revealed to be Melissa. Melissa is then seen spying on Aria talking over the phone to her doctor about her infertility issues. A few hours later, Melissa is outside the resort walking away. Suddenly, she unzips the hoodie, reaches into it and pulls off a lifelike mask to reveal that it was actually Mona. Mona proceeds to FaceTime "A.D." and it is divulged that they sent her to the Lost Woods in the Melissa mask as a loyalty test. "A.D." is eventually revealed to be Spencer's younger identical twin sister, Alex Drake, and thus Melissa's half-sister. Alex discloses to having engaged in a romantic relationship with Wren after Melissa began dating a composer sometime around the fifth season.
