= Escape from New York (Pretty Little Liars) =

- Pretty Little Liars episode
- Episode no.: Season 5 Episode 1
- Directed by: Norman Buckley
- Written by: I. Marlene King
- Cinematography by: Larry Reibman
- Editing by: Robert Lattanzio
- Original air date: June 10, 2014
- Running time: 42 minutes

Guest appearances
- Sean Faris as Gabriel Holbrook; Vanessa Ray as Charlotte Drake; Lesley Fera as Veronica Hastings; Brendan Robinson as Lucas Gottesman; Torrey DeVitto as Melissa Hastings; Lindsey Shaw as Paige McCullers; Brant Daugherty as Noel Kahn; Nolan North as Peter Hastings; Aeriel Miranda as Shana Fring

Episode chronology
← Previous "A Is for Answers"	Next → "Whirly Girlie"
- Pretty Little Liars (season 5)

"Escape from New York" is the first episode and the premiere of the fifth season of the American mystery drama television series Pretty Little Liars and the 96th episode of the series overall. The episode was written by showrunner I. Marlene King and directed by Norman Buckley, it aired on June 10, 2014 on ABC Family and was watched by 2.72 viewers.

== Plot ==
The episode opens with paramedics loading Ezra into an ambulance. Noel is being questioned by the police. Noel claims that he heard the gunshot and ran to the rooftop and found Ezra shot. Emily, Spencer and Hanna hold Aria back since they can do nothing to help Ezra and if Aria gets too close, she'll be spending the night at the police station answering questions. Afraid of being seen on the street, Alison watches from the balcony above, where she notices someone in a black hoodie lying on top of the ambulance as it drives away. At the hospital, Ezra is taken into surgery, while someone in a hooded figure watches on. Back on the streets, the girls have brought a burner phone and pepper spray. Emily is afraid that "A" will try to hurt Alison if they execute the plan they have come up with to keep 'A' away from Ezra. But Alison wants to go ahead with their plain since Ezra saved their lives and he is the only one who knows who ‘A’ is. Aria tells Emily that everything will finally over when Ezra pulls through and tells them who "A" is, but Emily is skeptical. Hanna calls the police with the burner phone, telling them that Ezra’a shooting wasn’t a random thing and he needs protection. With the first step of their plan executed, the girls split up with Aria and Alison heading one way and Spencer, Hanna and Emily heading in another. Hanna hands A's gun over to Aria as they leave. Emily is worried about Alison but Spencer and Hanna try to convince her that Alison has been hiding from ‘A’ in plain sight for the past 2 years and can take care of herself.

At the Hastings house, Veronica is on the phone with Ashley. She asks Ashley to call if she hears from Hanna and assures her that they’ll do the same. Melissa is shocked that Spencer knew all this time that Alison is alive. Veronica wants to believe that Spencer only found about Alison, a month ago as claimed by the photo CeCe showed Holbrook since it was around that time that Spencer's erratic behavior started. Melissa blames Alison for all the things that have gone wrong in Spencer's life but Veronica wants to reserve judgment since they have no idea what Alison's been through. Melissa thinks that Alison is a “time bomb” but it's everything around her that explodes and everyone around her ends up getting hurt. Melissa can't believe Alison would let her friends and family think that she was dead. Melissa wants to tell Veronica something, but before she can, the police arrive at their front door. Exiting the subway, Aria is confused about how Ezra found them. Alison tells Aria she thinks Ezra was following 'A', and 'A' was following the Liars. Alison tells her that the only reason Ezra was looking for Alison was to win back Aria, but Aria doesn’t want to talk about him since he may not even be alive.

Holbrook tells the Hastings that CeCe escaped custody. Holbrook thinks that since CeCe knows Alison is alive and the girls' location, Spencer could be in danger. He asks the family if there's anything else he should know. Melissa almost opens her mouth to say something but is stopped by Peter. He says there is nothing else that they have to say. Mona is at The Brew watching a news report saying that authorities are searching for the girls including Alison who was thought to be dead. Suddenly someone arrives and she says to them that Alison being alive changes everything.

Someone dressed in black and wearing a doctor's coat tries to make their way to Ezra's operation theatre but cops show up there and the person turns around and leaves. Spencer, Emily and Hanna arrive at the hospital and spot the same hooded person. They head to the waiting room and sit down, pretending to read magazines. Aria and Alison also enter the hospital and rush to a nurse's station, asking about Ezra. The person in the black hoodie is watching Spencer, Emily and Hanna in the waiting room. Suddenly, over the PA system, Alison is asked to report to the emergency room. The hooded person sends a group text reading: "It's happening. Follow the leader." Aria tells Alison to leave. The hooded figure goes into an elevator to pursue Alison and Emily, Spencer and Hanna follow. They watch on as the elevator closes with the hooded person in it and take the stairs. Alison leaves via the emergency exit. The hooded person follows Alison through the streets of New York to a playground where Alison hides herself, when suddenly from behind the hooded figure appears saying, “Want to play?” Spencer, Emily and Hanna show up, thinking that they’ve outsmarted ‘A’ and Alison pepper sprays the person. But suddenly dozens of other hooded people wearing masks arrive and start circling the four girls. The arrival of a passing police car chases them off. Meanwhile, Aria is alone at the hospital, waiting for Ezra's surgery to get completed. Aria overhears the doctor call Ezra's mother and tells her that the bullet has been removed and that he survived surgery.

Back in Rosewood, Mona is on the phone with someone, telling them to stay on top of this and that they are mobilizing. She gets off the phone and tells someone that the girls are not in Philadelphia, but in New York. The person turns out to be Lucas. Lucas says that there were supposed to be more people here and Mona assures him they’re coming. At the Hastings residence, Melissa says to her father that she needs to tell Holbrook the truth, thinking that if Spencer knew the truth she would have a reason to come back home. Peter tells her that Veronica must never know what Melissa told Peter. Holbrook gets a call from the NYPD, telling him about Ezra's shooting. Holbrook jumps online and starts looking at Ezra's records.

Aria is on the phone and updates the girls on Ezra. Aria says that since his mother's in Sydney and she's the only one there for him. The girls offer to come to the hospital but Aria thinks that the five of them together would look weird. Emily thinks Alison is the target now if ‘A’ can't get to Ezra. They need a place to stay safe for the night as Ezra won't wake up for hours and so Alison takes the girls to the Fitzgerald Theater. In a flashback, Alison recalls the first time she visited the theater with Ezra. Ezra claimed that a friend of the family worked at the theater and so they got to come there after hours. Alison talks about it must feel to stand there on the stage and be loved by so many people. She thinks that she can be an actress, to which Ezra replies that she already is since she narrates all her made-up stories which such conviction that it almost seems like she herself believes them. Just then, a janitor calls him Mr. Fitzgerald which is when Alison realized Ezra is rich. According to Alison, the theater doesn't open until noon the next day and so they should be safe there. They go to the concession stand to eat something since Spencer is hungry. Hanna, Spencer and Emily start talking about a TV show they are obsessed about, making Alison feel left out. Alison excuses herself to call a few friends and tell them she's okay since they’ve risked a lot to help her. Hanna follows Alison to try and listen to her call. Shana arrives at the hospital waiting room. She tells Aria that Alison sent her there to make sure Aria was okay, but Aria doesn't like it and thinks she doesn’t need someone to watch her. Shana is determined to stay.

Later that night as Alison is asleep, Spencer thinks that Alison's already shutting them out again, but Emily says that if they were the ones who helped her, they’d want Alison to call them. Spencer thinks that they are the ones who risked a lot to help Alison. The girls then talk about the potential of having a life without "A". Hanna says that she wouldn’t mind taking up a sport, like field hockey. Spencer says that all she cared about was winning before and now all she wants is to be happy. Back at the hospital, Aria has fallen asleep. Shana picks up Aria's jacket, drapes it over her and walks away. Later, as the four girls are asleep, somebody enters the theater. A gloved hand is placed over Alison's mouth. It turns out to be CeCe. Ali is surprised that CeCe found her. CeCe tells Alison that they don’t just look alike, they think alike as well. Alison thinks that CeCe took a big risk coming to New York. CeCe says that she didn’t have a choice since she needs Alison's help. Meanwhile, at the Rosewood police station, Holbrook is researching Ezra and finds out that Ezra is actually a Fitzgerald. Alison and CeCe are at a diner, meeting up with Noel. Noel hands over to CeCe Alison's fake passport and ticket along with some money. Alison is upset because this might be the last time she sees CeCe. CeCe assures her that they’ll find each other again and they hug. CeCe thanks her and leaves. Aria wakes up and is told Ezra is in recovery. She finds Shana standing at his bedside. Ezra starts to wake, but his vitals plummet when he sees Shana. As doctors rush in to stabilize him, Shana sneaks out.

Alison returns to the theater and finds Emily awake. Alison tells her that there are some things she doesn't need to know about but Emily isn't satisfied. Alison leads Emily away from the other girls. Mona addresses a group of people that includes Paige. The group has one thing in common: Alison mistreated them. Paige tells Mona that she's not scared of Alison anymore and that they are not what Alison used to call them. Mona retorts that Alison isn’t even back yet and she found a way to break up Paige and Emily. Paige tries to leave but Mona warns her that she can't protect Paige if she's not a part of this. As Paige opens the door, Melissa walks in, seemingly in charge of the operation, prompting Paige to stay.

Away from the other girls, Alison tells Emily that Ezra was paying CeCe for information. CeCe was never redcoat and in fact dressed as red coat, in Ravenswood, to distract ‘A’ so that Alison could turn off the saw and save Emily's life. Alison says that she can’t share this with the other girls since CeCe killed a cop (Wilden) for her and if CeCe is caught boarding the plane, Alison will be an accessory as its Alison's face on the passport. Now that Emily knows about it, she's an accessory too. Suddenly, Hanna and Spencer walk in, saying that they can’t hear Aria on the phone. Alison says that Aria should call the houseline. Holbrook finds the Fitzgerald Theater website online. He calls the number for the theater and Alison answers, thinking its Aria. She hangs up when Holbrook recognizes her voice. Holbrook calls the NYPD and advises them to send an officer to the Fitzgerald Theater. Aria tries to call the girls but they're now too scared to answer the phone. Seeing the cop in Ezra's room leave, Aria returns to Ezra's side and takes his hand. He whispers something into her ear and she rushes out of his hospital room.

Spencer and Hanna suggest that since Ezra is unable to tell them who ‘A’ is, Alison should use the passport and ticket that Noel gave her and leave. Alison admits that she gave them away to somebody who needed it more than her. Hanna and Spencer are furious that Alison is keeping secrets again and think no one needs to get out of the country more than Alison. The girls realize they need to leave and rush to the stage to gather their stuff. Suddenly the lights go off. When the lights come back on, Shana arrives holding a gun. Shana admits that she was the one who set fire to the lodge and locked them in, but Alison arrived late, foiling her plan. Shana says she found out who Alison really was when she was sent to Rosewood, by Alison, to ask questions. Shana was shocked by what she found out about Alison from the people she had hurt and that even Jessica was afraid of Alison. The girls tell her that she's sick, like Mona, but they can get her help. Shana says this is not a game to her and she's there for justice for what Alison had done to Jenna, whom she is in love with. Alison tries to convince her that Jenna is using her, but Shana tells her that that's what Alison does. She tells them that Jenna doesn’t even know Shana's here. Aria sneaks up behind Shana and ends up knocking her down into the orchestra pit. Blood pools from her head- Shana's dead. The girls try to assure Aria that she did what she had to do. They all believe it's finally over. Spencer calls the police to report an accident. Meanwhile, CeCe boards the plane to Paris using Alison's passport and ticket with the name Vivian Darkbloom. In the last scene of the episode, three police officers arrive at the Theater and discover Shana's body.

== Reception ==
=== Critical response ===
Jessica Goldstein of Vulture gave the episode a 4 out of 5 stars rating, commenting: "Among the highlights were an Ezra flashback, the early stages of a full-fledged anti-Alison army and several key revelations". Nick Campbell of TV.com slated: "I'm surprised someone wasn't wearing one of those Scream deals or an Eyes Wide Shut apothecary get-up".

=== Ratings ===
"Escape from New York" was broadcast on June 10, 2014. It was watched by 2.72 million viewers, scoring a 1.1 rating in the 18-49 demographic.
