= 'A' Is for Answers =

- Pretty Little Liars episode
- Hanna (Ashley Benson) wields A's gun while she, Aria (Lucy Hale) and Spencer (Troian Bellisario) threaten A to reveal themself and Alison (Sasha Pieterse) and Emily (Shay Mitchell) stand behind.
- Episode no.: Season 4 Episode 24
- Directed by: I. Marlene King
- Written by: I. Marlene King
- Cinematography by: Larry Reibman
- Editing by: Lois Blumenthal
- Original air date: March 18, 2014
- Running time: 43 minutes

Guest appearances
- Andrea Parker as Jessica DiLaurentis; Torrey DeVitto as Melissa Hastings; Lesley Fera as Veronica Hastings; Nolan North as Peter Hastings; Ryan Merriman as Ian Thomas; Vanessa Ray as CeCe Drake; Brant Daugherty as Noel Kahn; Jim Titus as Barry Maple; Sean Faris as Detective Gabriel Holbrook

Episode chronology
← Previous "Unbridled"	Next → "Escape from New York"
- Pretty Little Liars (season 4)

"'A' Is for Answers" is the twenty-fourth episode of the fourth season and the ninety-fifth episode of the ABC Family mystery drama series Pretty Little Liars. The episode, serving as the fourth-season finale and the winter finale, was broadcast on March 18, 2014. It was directed and written by I. Marlene King.

In the episode, the girls finally meet up with Alison in Philadelphia and learn from her about everything that happened the night she disappeared. Meanwhile, the girls' parents are scrambling to find them and the police bring Spencer's family in for questioning, thinking that she may have killed the girl in Alison's grave.

"'A' Is for Answers" premiered to an audience of 3.12 million viewers, up from the previous episode, and garnered a 1.3 rating in the 18-49 demographic. It also generated over 1.45 million tweets during its broadcast, becoming the most-tweeted episode of 2014 and the fourth most tweeted broadcast in television history. The episode received a general positive response from television critics, with calling it a "satisfying and surprising finale." Some critics, however, were dismayed by the questions surrounding the series' main plotline not being answered.

== Plot ==
=== Present day ===
Aria (Lucy Hale), Emily (Shay Mitchell), Hanna (Ashley Benson), and Spencer (Troian Bellisario) are led to a hiding place by Noel (Brant Daugherty), where they meet Alison (Sasha Pieterse). Alison recounts the night she disappeared and reveals that she had been confronting all of her "A" suspects that night. Meanwhile, Noel gives her a plane ticket and money for her to flee town. Alison also recounts her first time meeting Ezra and confirms to the girls that Spencer did not hurt her. After telling them about what happened that night, all the girls are attacked by what appears to be "A" and they run up to the roof. Ezra (Ian Harding) comes up just as "A" reaches them and claims to know who "A" is but "A" does not seem to care. He and "A" struggle for the gun, which is dropped in the struggle. Hanna picks it up and threatens the masked person at gunpoint to take off the mask. "A" pretends to reach for the mask, then jumps over to the next building and leaves through a door. The horrified girls then find that "A" managed to shoot Ezra in the stomach during the struggle and they call out for help.

Back at Rosewood, CeCe (Vanessa Ray) is detained by Detective Holbrook (Sean Faris) and questioned about Wilden's murder. She confesses that she knows who killed the Jane Doe in Alison's grave and that Alison is still alive. The police are then sent to the Hastings residence to gather clues for their investigation. Meanwhile, Veronica (Lesley Fera) is on the phone with Ashley and Ella trying to find out where the girls went to. Officer Holbrook brings Veronica and Melissa (Torrey DeVitto), who just came back from London after Toby told her about Spencer's relapse, to the precinct where he questions the family, including Peter (Nolan North), separately about Spencer's addiction during the summer Alison disappeared. Jessica (Andrea Parker) is brought in to the precinct for more information on Alison's whereabouts while being approached by Peter about an arrangement they have. Melissa and Peter later discuss the investigation, during which Melissa reveals that she knows who killed the girl in Alison's grave. Later that night, Jessica is buried in the Hastings' backyard by "A".

=== Two years earlier ===
In 2009, Alison hides out in Ian's hotel room at Hilton Head, listening in on Ian (Ryan Merriman) and Melissa fighting. After hearing that she meant nothing to him, she goes into his computer and copies his videos onto a flash drive. Armed with new evidence, Alison visits Jenna and blackmails her with the video of her and Toby, thinking she might be "A". When she receives another text from "A", she decides to make a plan to expose "A". Before leaving for the party, she takes some pills from her mother's purse. She meets the girls at Spencer's barn and slips the drugs into their cups, as a way of eliminating more suspects. She then meets with Toby, who wanted to thank her for freeing him from Jenna's blackmail. Afterwards, Ezra pulls up to her place to confront her about her lies. She leaves him with a kiss and sets out to meet Ian at the Kissing Rock. There, she threatens him with the videos from his computer and is warned that the videos could bring everyone down.

She returns to the barn to find an angry Spencer waiting for her. Alison tells Spencer not to saying anything about it but Spencer won't listen and remains on guard. During the confrontation, Spencer drops her pills, which Alison discovers to be "speed". Alison discovers Spencer's drug habit and after hearing Spencer's pleas, promises to keep her secret. She tells Spencer to go back to the barn and sleep. After meeting with Byron about his affair with Meredith, she returned to the barn and received no text messages.

Alison then returns home to find her mother looking through the window right before getting hit from behind. Hours later she wakes up to her mother burying her in the backyard. She's pulled out by Mrs. Grunwald and taken to the hospital, but runs away out of fear. She is discovered by Mona (Janel Parrish) walking through the streets covered in dirt and blood. Mona takes her to the Lost Woods Resort motel, where she cleans Alison up and gives her the idea to fake her death and leave Rosewood. After putting Alison to sleep, Mona goes to her "A" lair and plays with her dolls. The following morning, Alison thanks her by giving her the name of her stylist, telling "You don't have to be a loser". She leaves the motel in the morning and later finds out she had been played.

== Production ==
"'A' Is for Answers" was written and directed by I. Marlene King, serving as her fourth writing credit and second directing credit for the season. The episode also serves as King's third directing credit for the overall series. The table read for the episode began on October 21, 2013. Filming for the episode commenced the next day, October 22, and concluded on November 2, 2013. On October 23, 2013, Torrey DeVitto, who portrays Spencer's sister Melissa Hastings, confirmed her appearance on the episode on Twitter. Ryan Merriman, who portrays Melissa's deceased husband Ian Thomas, appears in the episode, marking his first since the season two episode "The Blond Leading the Blind." Other actors recurring in this episode include Brant Daugherty as Noel Kahn, Sean Faris as Detective Gabe Holbrook, Lesley Fera as Veronica Hastings, Chad Lowe as Byron Montgomery, Nolan North as Peter Hastings, Andrea Parker as Jessica DiLaurentis, Vanessa Ray as CeCe Drake, and Jim Titus as Barry Maple.

== Reception ==
=== Ratings ===
"'A' Is for Answers" premiered on ABC Family on March 18, 2014. It was watched by 3.12 million viewers and acquired a 1.3 rating in the 18-49 demographic. it was the most watched episode since the season four episode "Who's in the Box?" and the highest rated episode since the season four episode "Grave New World". The episode was the 95th consecutive number one telecast for the series in the Females 12-34 demographic with a 4.0 rating (translating to 1.8 million viewers), as well as the 50th number one telecast in the Women 18-49 demographic with a 2.3 rating (2.3 million viewers). The episode also generated over 1.45 million tweets, becoming the most tweeted telecast in 2014, the second most-tweeted episode of the series, behind the summer finale "Now You See Me, Now You Don't" and the fourth most tweeted telecast in television history.

=== Reviews ===
Autumne Montague of TVOvermind gave a positive review of the episode, calling it a "satisfying and surprising finale" and was pleased that the episode gave a timeline of the events of the night that Alison disappeared. Montague also lauded Pieterse's character for her self-awareness in having admitted to not be a good friend, calling it "refreshing from a girl who in flashbacks seemed simply self-absorbed." She also highlighted how she helped Spencer come to terms with what happened that night despite their relationship. Steve Helmer of Yahoo! Voices gave a positive review of the episode, writing "I was somewhat disappointed when that mask wasn't removed. But, the episode did a good job of answering just enough questions to bring some closure to old storylines while, at the same time, creating new questions to keep things interesting. In other words, it was a pretty decent season finale." Jessica Goldstein of Vulture gave the episode 4 out of 5 stars.

Caroline Preece of Den of Geek wrote a mixed review for the episode, highlighting the flashbacks as a "decent recap of everything we've previously learnt about that night" but ultimately deemed the finale as "finished off season four on a frustrating note." Preece added "Disregarding the backpedalling that has gone on since the EzrA reveal, the second half of the season was stronger than the show has been in a while but, with promises not delivered on and satisfying answers dropped in as red herrings with alarming frequency, it's hard not to assume that the writers are just making it up as they go along at this point." Nick Campbell of TV.com gave it a negative review, saying "It was disappointing to see such a weak ending to an episode that was essentially created for fan service. I know a lot of people will feel cheated because A wasn't unmasked, but the episode was truly dedicated to providing clarification, if not answers, to many a question. At the very least, it cleared up the timeline and helped narrow down the field as to who A is. The problem with a show like this is that there's a general impatience with knowing the answers, and that frustration often gets conflated with a malaise concerning the show in general. Pretty Little Liars isn't perfect. God help us, we can enumerate the actual problems with the series for hours. But how it reveals the core tenet of the show isn't one of them. Someday, Pretty Little Liars will get to the point like Bones or Chuck did, where the main serial conceit will wear itself out so much that A will have to be unmasked because that premise gets old. But not just yet".
