= Spencer Hastings =

Fictional character in Pretty Little Liars

- Pretty Little Liars character
- Troian Bellisario as Spencer Hastings in the television series
- First appearance: Pretty Little Liars (2006)
- Created by: Sara Shepard
- Portrayed by: Troian Bellisario
- Voiced by: Cassandra Morris (Pretty Little Liars–Wanted); Katie Schorr (The Liars)
- Adapted by: I. Marlene King

In-universe information
- Full name: Spencer Jill Hastings
- Aliases: Television: Jane Doe; Mary Smith
- Nicknames: Television: Jane Bond; Harriet the Spy; Doctor Amateur; Veronica Mars; Lucy Liu; Nikita; Nancy Drew; Velma; Spence
- Occupation: Novel: College student Legal Aid; Television: "A" (formerly); Law student Paralegal at the Hastings & Hastings firm
- Affiliation: The Liars; The A-Team (formerly)
- Spouses: Books: Wren Kim; Television: Toby Cavanaugh
- Significant others: Novel: Ian Thomas (flirt); Wren Kim (boyfriend); Colin DeSoto (crush); Zach Pennythistle (flirt); Andrew Campbell (ex-boyfriend); Reefer Fredricks (ex-boyfriend); Television: Ian Thomas (kissed); Alex Santiago (ex-boyfriend); Wren Kingston (kissed); Caleb Rivers (ex-boyfriend); Marco Furey (sexual relationship); Jonny Raymond (kissed); Colin (kissed)
- Hometown: Rosewood, Pennsylvania
- Alma mater: Novel: Princeton University; Television: Georgetown University

Family and relatives
- Parents: Novel: Veronica Hastings (mother); Peter Hastings (father); Television: Mary Drake (biological mother); Peter Hastings (father); Veronica Hastings (adoptive mother)
- Siblings: Novel: Melissa Hastings; Alison and Courtney DiLaurentis (half-sisters); Television: Alex Drake (younger twin sister); Melissa Hastings (paternal half-sister); Charlotte Drake (maternal half-sister; deceased); Jason DiLaurentis (paternal half-brother)
- Relatives in the novels: Daniel (maternal uncle); Genevieve (maternal aunt); Jonathan (cousin); Smith (cousin); Penelope (paternal aunt); Duncan (great-great-great grandfather)
- Relatives in television: Alison DiLaurentis (maternal cousin); Jessica Drake (maternal aunt); Grace DiLaurentis-Fields (first cousin once removed; by Alison); Lily DiLaurentis-Fields (first cousin once removed; by Alison); Daniel Cavanaugh (father-in-law); Marion Cavanaugh (mother-in-law; deceased); Mrs. Cavanaugh (step mother-in-law); Jenna Marshall (step sister-in-law)
- Seasons: 1–7

Spencer Jill Hastings is a fictional character, one of the five main characters who appear in the Pretty Little Liars novel series and its Freeform television adaptation. Created by American author Sara Shepard, she is a member of the group known as the Liars, and is best friend to the four other members, who are protagonists of the story. Portrayed by Troian Bellisario, the character was developed for television by the series' showrunner I. Marlene King and appeared in each of the show's 160 episodes during its seven-years-long run, from its premiere on June 8, 2010, to its finale on June 27, 2017.

Spencer is known in the fictional town of Rosewood for her charm, intelligence, hardheadedness, and dedication to achieve her life goals. She is part of the wealthy Hastings family; Spencer's parents, Veronica and Peter, are both linked to politics and her sister, Melissa is an almost-equally accomplished grad student.

For her role as Spencer, Bellisario was nominated thrice for Choice Summer TV Star: Female (winning once) and twice for Choice TV Actress: Drama (winning once) in the Teen Choice Awards.

== Character in print ==
Spencer is one of four primary protagonists in all sixteen of the Pretty Little Liars novels, starting with 2006's Pretty Little Liars. She is portrayed as a competitive girl who strives for perfection in everything she does. Spencer is willing to do whatever it takes to win, often to the detriment of herself and others. She is known to have a dark side and suffers from rage-induced black outs, which leads her to question whether she had anything to do with the death of her friend Alison. She also exhibits symptoms of OCD but it is never confirmed whether she has the disorder.

In later books, Spencer is briefly addicted to drugs, which she takes to help her improve her grades at a University of Pennsylvania summer school. It is also revealed that her father had an affair with Jessica DiLaurentis around the time of Spencer's conception, making her the half-sister of Alison and Courtney DiLaurentis.

Spencer has an ongoing rivalry with her older sister, Melissa, who is equally competitive. The two slowly come to an understanding and eventually have an improved relationship.

=== Relationships ===
- Ian Thomas: Spencer and Ian kissed while he was dating Melissa and their flirtation was condemned by Alison, who threatened to expose it to Melissa.
- Wren Kim: Wren is Melissa's fiancé who moves into the Hastings' barn with Melissa. He and Spencer flirt, culminating in them kissing and being caught by Melissa, who breaks up with Wren and kicks him out. Spencer and Wren continue to secretly date, but eventually break up. In the final book, Spencer reconnects with Wren and they begin a relationship, with Melissa's blessing.
- Colin DeSoto: A handsome young man that Spencer and Melissa meet with they are visiting their grandparents in the companion novel Pretty Little Secrets. Spencer and Melissa compete for his affections but when they find out that Colin is actually a 33-year-old married man with a child, they team up to get back at him by spiking his soda water with Viagra before a tennis match.
- Chase and Curtis: After enlisting a blogger's help in finding "A", Spencer meets with blogger Chase and they share a mutual romantic attraction. However, she later discovers that the guy she thought was Chase was actually his brother, Curtis. She meets the real Chase at the end of the novel; though they do not begin an official relationship, it is implied that they will stay in touch. Throughout the final book, the two become closer during their mission to take down "A" and her accomplice.

== Character on screen ==
=== Casting ===
Troian Bellisario was cast as Spencer Hastings for the Pretty Little Liars television series adaptation in November 2009.

=== Characterization ===
Spencer is similar to her book counterpart: she is portrayed as a highly ambitious, intelligent young woman from a wealthy family who frequently competes with her older sister Melissa for accolades and the approval of their parents. However, in the show, Spencer is portrayed as more emotional and sentimental, and more humorous than her book counterpart. She's the most academically gifted of her friends, and in the running for valedictorian. Spencer is on the Rosewood Day field hockey team, and plays tennis at her family's country club. She was the only one who could ever stand up to Alison, although she still deferred to Alison.

=== Relationships ===
Before the series' chronology, Spencer had a brief affair with Ian Thomas, her sister's boyfriend at the time. Ian and Spencer kissed and Alison saw them together, and later she threatened to tell Melissa. It was later revealed that Alison asked Ian to kiss Spencer. In season one, Spencer flirts with Melissa's fiancé, Wren Kingston when he moves into the Hastings home and the two are caught kissing by Melissa. She ends her engagement with Wren and refuses to speak to him or Spencer. An apologetic Spencer attempts to reunite Wren and Melissa but he tells her that he wishes he could have met her before Melissa. Spencer then dates Alex Santiago after they met at her family's country club but A sabotages their relationship and the two break up.

Spencer is initially suspicious of Toby Cavanaugh's role in Alison's death and they begin a friendly relationship in the second half of the first season, which eventually becomes romantic Their relationship is stable until A threatens Toby's life to Spencer and she decided to end things to keep him safe. After breaking up with Toby, Spencer seeks out Wren but their reconciliation is short-lived. Spencer reunites with Toby when she discovers he has been working separately to take A down. However, it is later revealed that Toby was actually working with A, causing Spencer break up with him. After Toby dies, Spencer is distraught and begins to question whether he was working with A. She eventually learns that Toby is still alive and he explains that he was working with A as a double-agent and faked his death but his allegiance was always with Spencer and The Liars. They then happily reconcile.

In season 5, Toby joins the Rosewood police force, which strains his relationship with Spencer. Spencer wants to use his police resources to find "A" while Toby prefer to maintain a separate work/life balance, causing the two to break up again. Spencer then begins a flirtation with Jonny Raymond, an artist renting out the Hastings' guest house. He eventually leaves town after being arrested for theft. Spencer then has a fling with Colin when she is visiting London with Melissa. In season 6, when Spencer returns to Rosewood, she and Toby resume their relationship. In the mid-season finale, Spencer attends Georgetown University. She has a pregnancy scare and she and Toby realize they want different things in their lives, leading to their break up.

Following the series' five years jump in season 6, Spencer dates Caleb Rivers but they later break up due to Caleb's feelings for Hanna. In the series finale, Spencer and Toby rekindle their relationship and in Pretty Little Liars: The Perfectionists, it is mentioned that she and Toby eloped.

=== Season 1 ===
Spencer Hastings is a preppy, ambitious, and competitive student who strives for perfection due to her parents' high expectations. She is resentful of her older sister Melissa, to whom she is always compared. Spencer is attracted to her sister's fiancé, Wren, whom A warns Spencer to stay away from. Wren kisses Spencer and they are caught by Melissa, who insists that Wren move out. Melissa is angry and resentful towards Spencer afterwards. Spencer feels especially guilty because years earlier, she flirted with Melissa's boyfriend Ian and he kissed her, culminating in his break up with Melissa. She attempts to help Wren reconcile with Melissa but both parties are uninterested.

Spencer starts dating Alex Santiago who works at her family's country club. Her mother initially dislikes him, but later reveals it is because she is embarrassed that she drunkenly revealed her breast cancer scare to him. Alex confides in Spencer that he had received an invitation to a prestigious tennis clinic but was uninterested in pursuing it. A sends Alex's application to the clinic and fakes messages that Spencer sent the application, which causes Alex to break up with her, believing that Spencer betrayed his trust.

Spencer is the most suspicious and paranoid of the group, and she opposes Emily's friendship with Toby. But after the two spend time together in a motel room in the episode "Person of Interest", the two begin a romantic relationship. Spencer's family disapproves of their relationship and "A" also conspires to keep them apart. Nevertheless, Spencer insists on staying with Toby.

Ian returns to Rosewood as Spencer's field hockey coach and he reconciles with Melissa, which makes Spencer nervous given their past relationship. Spencer becomes concerned when Melissa and Ian suddenly elope and Melissa becomes pregnant, especially after it is revealed that Alison had a secret relationship with Ian, making him a suspect in her murder.

Spencer and the rest of the Liars strongly begin to believe that Ian was Alison's murderer and he realizes that Spencer knows about his relationship with Alison. The two have a tense relationship and Ian successfully convinces the Hastings family that Spencer's erratic behavior is due to jealousy of him and Melissa. Spencer sends anonymous text messages to Ian, threatening to expose him. When Spencer and Melissa get into a car accident, Spencer goes back to the church to get Melissa's phone, where Ian is waiting. He reveals that he knows Spencer is behind the messages and attempts to kill her but he is then attacked by a mysterious figure, who then kills Ian. The rest of the Liars join Spencer and call the police but when the police arrive, Ian's body is gone.

A flashback reveals that Spencer and Alison got into a major argument on the night of her disappearance, suggesting Spencer is also a suspect in Alison's murder.

=== Season 2 ===
The police do not believe the Liars' version of events and believe Ian has gone missing. Spencer learns that someone has been texting Melissa from Ian's phone, pretending that he is still alive. Spencer is concerned for Melissa, especially after her miscarriage, but Melissa is distrustful of Spencer. The two eventually reconcile after they discover Ian's body and Melissa finally accepts that he is dead.

Spencer and Toby are still dating in season 2. While doing yard work for the Hastings, Toby digs up Spencer's old field hockey stick which she gave to Alison before she died. Spencer's father, Peter, sees this and quickly takes the stick, and later burns it. Spencer becomes suspicious and after doing some further investigating, she reads Alison's autopsy results and finds that she was struck in the head with an object similar to a field hockey stick. She discovers that Peter did something illegal for the DiLaurentis family and worries that her father covered up her involvement in Alison's murder.

After "A" sends a threatening message about Toby, Spencer decides that the best way to keep Toby safe is to break up with him despite his declaration of love for her. Spencer tries to remain friends with him but he rebuffs her attempts.

Spencer becomes suspicious of Jason DiLaurentis, especially when she and Emily break into his shed and find pictures of Aria. In episode 19, she discovers Peter had an affair with Jessica DiLaurentis and Jason is her half-brother. The reveal divides their family and a distraught Spencer rekindles her romance with Wren as a distraction.

Spencer continues to investigate A and thinks the Black Swan from the episode "UnmAsked" is A. In the season finale, she discovers A's lair and learns that Mona is A. She is attacked by Mona and they get into a struggle in which Spencer accidentally pushes Mona off of a cliff, almost killing her. The police arrive alongside Toby, who tells Spencer that he still loves her. The season ends with the two reconciled.

=== Season 3 ===
Summer has passed since the unveiling of A but Spencer is determined to uncover the Black Swan, whom she believes is another A still working with Mona. She eventually discovers it was Melissa, who claims that she was blackmailed into showing up at the masked ball. Spencer decides to believe her, but is still suspicious. Meanwhile, she and Toby grow closer and the two eventually have sex for the first time. However, Spencer begins to suspect that Toby is not on their side. When Hanna finds the key to "A"'s new lair and gives it to Spencer, Spencer sets a trap for Toby. She catches him trying to steal it while wearing A's signature jacket, proving he is a member of the A-Team, conspirators who are aligned with A. She breaks up with him, but doesn't tell her friends why.

Spencer gives the key to a private investigator and gives him a picture of Toby and her, before ripping it in half. She tells the private investigator to follow Toby. After breaking up with Toby, Spencer begins to withdraw from her friends, and becomes emotionally unstable. She becomes obsessed with finding A and the mysterious person in the red coat. In the episode "Out of Sight, Out of Mind" she follows Mona into the woods and discovers what appears to be Toby's dead body. Spencer attempts to chase Mona but gets lost in the woods. In the morning, she is found by a hiker in a catatonic state and is admitted to the Radley Sanitarium. Mona visits her in the sanitarium and offers to let Spencer join the A-Team. In the episode "I'm Your Puppet," Spencer accepts her offer.

In the Season 3 finale "A Dangerous GAme", Spencer comes up with a plan to trap the Red Coat and reveals to the Liars that she is working for the A-Team as a double agent. Toby contacts Spencer, revealing that he is alive. He explains that he joined the A-Team to protect her and the two make up and have sex. As part of the plan, Spencer hosts a party at a lodge where the girls are supposed to meet the Red Coat, when an unknown figure starts a fire, trapping Aria, Hanna, Emily, and Mona in the burning house. Toby leads Spencer into the woods to see who the Red Coat is. Spencer sees a helicopter land in the woods and the Red Coat step off. Spencer catches a glimpse of her face and believes to have seen Alison. The Red Coat rescues the Liars from the burning house and Hanna and Mona also believe to have seen Alison. The group drives back to Rosewood and see Wilden's car dug up from the lake. All of them, including Mona, get a text from A.

=== Season 4 ===
Spencer and her friends continue to be tormented by A. Ashley Marin is arrested for Wilden's murder and Spencer's mother Veronica Hastings is her defense attorney. Spencer gives Hanna and her mother emotional support in the lead up to the trial. She also supports Toby in finding out the truth about his mother even though she does not approve of him trusting A for clues.

In the midseason finale, Spencer and her friends go to Ravenswood after receiving a puzzling clue from A. There, she and her friends discover that there are two Red Coats. One is revealed to be CeCe Drake and Spencer chases the other Red Coat, who leads her to A's apartment. Spencer and the others search the apartment and deduce the owner is a male. In the episode "Grave New World" the Liars learn that A believe Alison will be returning to Ravenswood on the night of the graveyard party. While looking for Alison, the Liars becomes separated while searching an old house. Spencer comes across A and tries to unmask him but is knocked out. It is later revealed that Ezra is the male A. Giving up on their search, the Liars return Spencer's car and discover her tires are slashed. Ezra suddenly arrives and give them a ride home. Back at Spencer's, the Liars see the Red Coat and follow her into Spencer's garden. The Red Coat is revealed to be Alison, who is not dead.

Following this, Spencer tries even harder to work out who A is in order to make it safe for Alison to come home. Overwhelmed by both her investigation and school work, she begins abusing amphetamines. It is revealed that she had abused amphetamines before and was addicted to them the summer prior to Ali's disappearance. This leads her to begin to question her own role in the death of the girl in Ali's grave that night. She eventually ends up being sent to rehab by her parents, and upon getting out, she meets Alison in New York. Alison assures her that while they did argue on the night of her disappearance, Spencer went back to sleep and had nothing to do with the murder.

=== Season 5 ===
With Alison's return, Spencer has a hard time getting used Alison's domineering attitude. Spencer struggles with the idea of her father being the killer of Jessica DiLaurentis. Spencer's rivalry with her sister Melissa is put to an end when Melissa reveals that she's the one who buried Bethany Young, in order to protect Spencer. Later, Spencer is arrested for Bethany's murder; however, she was released shortly after when the P.D. gets convinced that Alison is the one who is really responsible. Toby becomes a cop, which makes his relationship with Spencer tough, since Spencer wants him to share all the information the police has, but Toby starts to prefer keeping his work and personal life private. The love drought leads Spencer to other men — Jonny and Colin. Spencer and Melissa's relationship gets awkward again when Melissa lies to Spencer. In the season finale, Spencer and the others are arrested as accomplices to Mona's murder; however, on the way to prison, their van is hijacked by "A." and they get taken to A's 'DollHouse'

=== Season 6 ===
In the aftermath of the Liars' abduction orchestrated by "A," Spencer's old addiction surfaces again in order to relieve stress. A sleep disorder also recur due to the torture she had faced while being trapped in A'S Dollhouse, and it heavily intensifies the addiction, making Spencer ask for help from Dean, and old counselor, and Sabrina, the new-in-charge at the Brew who gives Spencer brownies with marijuana. Spencer starts to investigate who's behind the Carissimi Group and who Charles is. Meanwhile, her relationship with Toby remains untouchable. In the mid-season finale, it is revealed that CeCe Drake is "A," and the Liars finally gets peace.

Afterwards, Spencer moves to Georgetown in order to get involved with a future political career in Washington, D.C., and ends up in a lobbyist career. She returns to Rosewood five years later at Alison's request, and also to depose on Charlotte's release from psychological hospital. It is revealed that during the five last years she and Toby broke up because of the distance and the different future plans, and, following, she started a thrilling flirt with Caleb Rivers. Having to stay in Rosewood after Charlotte was murdered, she starts working on her mother's election campaign for Senate, while the daughter of the other candidate is Yvonne Phillips, Toby's current girlfriend. Spencer finds out that Charlotte was killed in a copycat manner off a murder she wrote an essay about in college, leading her to start thinking that the police could blame her for Charlotte's death.

A new stalker, now entitled as "A.D.", surfaces, resulting in tension. When a document about Yvonne's mother leaks and Caleb takes the blame, Spencer goes crazy, and Toby fights with him. Spencer, along with the other Liars, Caleb, Mona and Toby, elaborate a plan to take "A.D." down, but everything goes down when the stalker kidnaps Hanna.

=== Season 7 ===
In "The Darkest Knight", Spencer is shot by Uber A during the attack by Jenna and Noel. As Jenna is preparing to shoot her again, out of revenge for her and Charlotte, Mary Drake comes in and knocks Jenna out. Mary then cradles Spencer's body and reveals that she is indeed Spencer's mother, making Spencer the biological sister of Cece Drake. In season 7b, Spencer and the other liars receive a big board game called "Liar's Lament", and in the episode "These Boots Are Made For Stalking", it is revealed that Spencer is Mary Drake's second child. In the last half of the last episode, we find out that Spencer was locked up inside a "cell". While the "Spencer", who we saw kissing Toby and then having sex with, was actually Alex Drake, her twin sister, also known as A.D.. Alex, jealous of Spencer, wanted to have everything she never had, a family, friends, and even Toby, who she had "fallen in love with", so she kidnapped the real Spencer, pretending to be her all the time. And through the flashbacks, we are shown when Alex Drake impersonates her sister. It was Alex, not Spencer, who was with Hanna when Hanna was kidnapped. In the flashbacks, we are shown some examples of when Alex has "played" Spencer. Alex was the one who asked Toby for "one last kiss, just to say goodbye" in "The DArkest Knight". Spencer and Ezra, who had been kidnapped as well, escaped the cell, but soon were trapped with Alex. Spencer and Alex fought until the Liars plus Toby and Caleb found them. Both pleading to be the "real" Spencer, Toby figures out who the real Spencer is by asking what is her favorite poem in the book she gave him in "The DArkest Knight". The real Spencer responds with the correct response and Alex is arrested along with Mary Drake. Spencer and Toby resume their relationship and start dating again at the end of the series.

==== Pretty Little Liars: The Perfectionists ====
It is revealed in Pretty Little Liars: The Perfectionists that Spencer and Toby eloped in secret.

==== Pretty Little Liars (2022) ====
In the second season episode "Chapter Fifteen: Friday the 13th", Tabby Haworthe and Imogen Adams break into Dr. Sullivan's office and go through the private practice files, finding some on Spencer, Emily Fields, Hanna Marin and Aria Montgomery.
