= The First Secret =

- Pretty Little Liars episode
- Episode no.: Season 2 Episode 13
- Directed by: Dana Gonzales
- Written by: I. Marlene King
- Cinematography by: Geoffrey Haley
- Editing by: Lois Blumenthal
- Original air date: October 19, 2011
- Running time: 42 minutes

Guest appearances
- Janel Parrish as Mona Vanderwaal; Torrey DeVitto as Melissa Hastings; Tammin Sursok as Jenna Marshall; Amanda Schull as Meredith Sorenson; Drew Van Acker as Jason DiLaurentis; Bryce Johnson as Darren Wilden; Ryan Merriman as Ian Thomas; Bryce Johnson as Officer Darren Wilden; Cody Christian as Mike Montgomery; Laura Leighton as Ashley Marin; Keegan Allen as Toby Cavanaugh; Giant Drag as Themselves

Episode chronology
← Previous "Over My Dead Body"	Next → "Through Many Dangers, Toils and Snares"
- Pretty Little Liars (season 2)

"The First Secret" is the thirteenth episode of the second season of the American mystery drama series Pretty Little Liars and the 35th episode of the series overall.

This episode is a prequel to the series' pilot episode and is set on Halloween 2008, one year before the disappearance of Alison DiLaurentis.

The episode aired on October 19, 2011, on ABC Family and was watched by 2.47 viewers.

== Plot ==
On October 28, 2008, Alison narrates a scary story. It's about two blonde twins, who are shown on screen. After getting into a fight over a doll, one of them gets mad and stabs the other in the heart with a knife on Halloween. Camera cuts to Alison telling the story to a frightened kid that Hanna is babysitting. Hanna thinks Alison should stop, but the child is riveted. So, Alison continues on about how the murderess little girl went to the asylum—“until yesterday!” and vows to kill every kid who goes trick-or-treating. Alison then maniacally stabs the butcher knife she is holding deep into the pumpkin they are carving on the table.

The girls walk to school debating Halloween costumes—Hanna wants to go as Britney Spears. Alison is bossy with regards to Hanna's decision and makes a jab about Hanna's weight. Emily reveals that she is going with Ben, who wants her to dress up as a cop, while she wants to go as a Native American. Meanwhile, Spencer is texting on her cell phone, getting updates about her success in the school elections for class president. She just found out that she's secured the debate team's votes. Noel drives up in a convertible with his jock friends to greet the Liars and especially Alison. Spying Aria, he says "come prepared to be scared," exciting her with the knowledge that they are invited to Noel's bash. As Noel drives away, Alison mocks the other Liars for being so excited to attend the party. They continue walking and pass a run-down abandoned house. A figure is seen in one of the upstairs windows, and Emily calls it out, frightening the other girls. Aria comments that she gets a bad feeling from this place, feeling as if something bad had happened there. Spencer attributes the movement to typical Rosewood kid activity on Halloween, and Alison is equally nonchalant. When they walk away, someone opens the door, and a van is seen marked "Radley Sanitarium." Implying that Alison's story may not have been fictional.

After that, Emily walks the rest of the way home herself. She spots Toby unloading a moving van. He's looking at a snow globe. Emily approaches him and notes his subdued mood. He's bummed that his dad has remarried and that the new wife is moving in with her daughter. Emily asks what the daughter is like, and he responds that she gets whatever she wants. Emily then admires the snow globe.

At the costume shop, Noel startles Alison by grabbing her from behind and covering her mouth while wearing a scary mask. Alison is ruffled, but not upset. She then spots the new girl in Rosewood buying a costume - a "Lady G." costume to be precise. She tries to intimidate her to buy a different one, declaring that that is her own costume choice for this year. The new girl noncommittally agrees to think about changing her decision, but turns her attention away from Alison. Before walking away, Alison offers her name, to which the girl replies that she already knows it, and her own name is Jenna. They smile pleasantly, if not fakely, at each other, and Alison strolls away with her basket on her arm. She then gets an anonymous text that says "I’m watching you" from a blocked number. Unnerved, she scans the store for the perpetrator, but discovers nothing. She then turns to be surprised once more by another scary mask-clad person, only this one has on a burlap outfit, and Alison is not tolerant of the sneak-up. She barks "freak" before walking away, without knowing who the person behind the mask is.

In Spencer's living room, Alison flirts with Melissa's boyfriend Ian, who is holding a video camera in his hand. He films Alison talking about her grandmother in Georgia who was a sweater model. After a few more lines about her own photogenically, she turns the camera on Ian and films him talking himself up. Alison immediately sets the camera down when Melissa and Spencer descend the stairs. Ian takes it up again as Melissa praises Spencer's speech for class president, and Spencer admits that her parents have already planned the congratulatory party. Aria visits her father's office at Hollis College, bumping into Ezra on the way. She is about to leave a note for her father, when she sees Meredith lying barefoot on the couch of her father's office, lazily reading a book. Aria is not very suspicious, though she finds the woman's behavior odd. When Byron returns to his office, he expresses his surprise at seeing Meredith there, but acts coolly. Aria attributes Meredith's presence in his office to her father being so cool in the eyes of his students.

In her bedroom that night, pajama-clad Hanna watches a scary movie beside a huge bowl of popcorn. The phone rings, just as a voice on the film says not to answer the phone. Hanna reluctantly picks up, but nobody responds. Next, the power goes off then on, making the lights flicker momentarily, and the phone rings again. Hanna picks up, and this time, it's Alison asking if she was at the costume shop and had sent her a text. When Hanna responds in the negative, Alison doesn't bother to explain her questioning and hangs up. Just then, there is a knock at the door—but it's not the bogeyman, exactly, but policeman Darren driving a drunken Ashley home. Apparently, Ashley had binged on martinis at The Grille. It is revealed that Ashley is upset about her husband leaving and is stressed about dealing with the situation he has left behind in Rosewood. As Ashley falls asleep on the couch, Hanna consoles her that her dad's new girlfriend is pretty ugly.

The next day, Spencer is manning a booth in the school cafeteria, trying to garner votes for the class presidency. Meanwhile, Aria and Emily sit in the cafeteria together at a table near the jocks' table, where Ben is sitting. Hanna lets her friends know that Emily's boyfriend Ben has been telling people that they have had sex. Enraged, Aria is about to charge over to him, when Emily grabs her by the shirt to force her to sit back down. The girls are shocked that Emily isn't indignantly furious, but then it dawns on them that Emily might be trying to tell them something. When they suggest that Emily has indeed done the deed, she doesn't deny it. Then, Alison joins their table, and a nerdy Mona tries to do the same. Alison vends her off, leaving her to nurse her wounds at Lucas' table. Spencer then join them just as Alison hears that Ben is telling everyone they had sex; Ali seems impressed. Later, Aria and Alison go out for frozen yogurt. While they are walking, Mona sees them and calls out to join them. Aria looks inclined to stop, but Alison propels Aria forward in attempt to lose Mona. They run until they turn a corner past some bushes, then stop in their tracks when they see Byron and Meredith making out in his car. Byron is all smiles until he spots his daughter and her crestfallen face.

Next, Alison is seen sitting on her bed, writing in a notebook. When Jason enters without knocking, she immediately shuts the notebook. Jason glances at her move before demanding $20. After she forks it over, he then tosses her a package that was on the porch for her. He stares expectantly, hoping to see what's inside, but Alison is careful not to open it until he's gone. Inside is a burlap doll with a red heart and a pin and a note that says "It’s my turn to torture you." Ali reads the typed note aloud. She then opens the radiator grill to fetch the box of her hidden belongings. She twists the head of her own porcelain doll and puts the note inside the neck. She recaps it and stores it all back where it was. Meanwhile, someone is spying on their house with binoculars and zooming in on their mailbox. Hanna enters the kitchen with her Britney costume, as her mother sits reading the newspaper on the counter. She is looking through the job listings, glum at having found little better than maid openings. When she spots an opening for a bank branch manager in Rosewood, she pauses considering. Suddenly, Darren comes by to "check" on Ashley. Ashley takes him aside, not wanting Hanna to hear. Darren makes implied advances, but Ashley lets him down, calling his expectations a misunderstanding. He ominously warns her to be careful out there. When Ashley returns inside, Hanna questions the behavior. “That was a horny cop,” Ashley replies, writing it away firmly.

Spencer is in her living room making something on her sewing machine when Alison comes knocking. Alison informs Spencer that a friend on the election committee has let her know that Spencer may not win the election. Alison tries not to be too harsh, telling her that it will be close. Spencer is crestfallen, afraid of her parents' reactions. Alison uses the opportunity to bash Melissa for purposely trying to outshine Spencer in her parents' eyes. After all, Melissa had made some of the phone calls in inviting people to Spencer's congratulatory party. Her motive in creating the sibling rivalry is not totally clear. She toys with the needles and stabs one deep into the holder near the sewing machine as she talks. Ali offers to fix the election for her, and Spencer accepts. That night, Aria returns home to her room as Byron sits looking at an old family album. He lets Aria know that he had tried to contact her all day (trying to prevent Ella from finding out the truth). Ella and Mike are at dinner. (Clearly, Byron had tried to keep Aria away from them until he had a chance to talk to her.) Byron announces that Meredith is dropping his class, implying that their relationship is ending. He then asks Aria to lie about it to her mother, because it's over now, and telling her would make it worse. “I don’t think I can ever forgive you,” Aria squeaks. When Byron tries to embrace, Aria she turns roughly away from him. In turn, Byron has the decency to tell Aria that he respects whatever decision she ultimately make. Aria sits down to cry, and Byron stands in the doorway, crying silent tears himself.

The next day, Emily walks with Alison. Alison discusses the possibility of Emily going on the pill, but she confesses to Ali that the rumors aren't true, and she won't be needing contraception yet. She has made out with Ben, but they haven't gone all the way. She asks Alison not to tell anyone, and Alison is perplexed until she discovers Emily's secret later that night. Later in the school hallways, Alison suggestively lets Spencer know that it has been taken care of. When the other Liars question her comment, she lies that she had helped Spencer with her speech. Alison changes the subject by piteously asking Aria how her mother is. Aria shoots daggers at Alison and is about to respond when Lucas Gottesman bumps into Alison, dumping his drink on her. Angry, Alison rejects Lucas' apologies, mercilessly calling him "Hermie" and publicly suggesting that he's really a hermaphrodite. When Alison walks away, Lucas growls that she will get what's coming to her, and Mona nods uncomfortably in silent agreement, having witnessed the whole exchange. Next, there is an announcement over the school loudspeaker that the election results are in, and Spencer Hastings is the winner. Smiling, but insecure, Spencer accepts people's congratulations, and Alison winks knowingly at her.

That night, kids are seen trick-or-treating in their costumes, and the girls get dressed in Spencer's bedroom. Hanna is donning her Britney costume, Emily is dressed as a Native American, and Spencer is wearing a corset dress. True to her promise, Alison is dressed as Lady Gaga. Aria walks in and announces that she doesn't feel like going. The girls accept Aria's decision, sans explanation, but Alison doesn't. Suddenly, someone dressed in a burlap cowl with a doll mask is seen outside the window. Spencer notices him/her, and the girls all squeal with worry. The doorbell then rings, presumably for a pizza delivery, but Spencer insists on going downstairs in company. When Alison and Aria are left alone, Alison criticizes Aria for being such a downer and not going to the party after she supposedly worked so hard to score her an invitation. Aria gives a meek defense.

The Halloween party has everyone in an actual costume—nobody in a flannel shirt pretending to be a hobo. Noel, dressed as a gynecologist, approaches to greet them, correctly characterizing Ali as Lady GaGa (or hot chick), Emily as a Native American, Hanna as cute Britney, and Aria as a witch. Only Spencer as Mary Queen of Scots he can't place. When she begins to explain, Noel goes right to Jenna, who is also dressed as a sexy Lady GaGa. When a Lady GaGa song starts playing, Mona, dressed in a cat-suit, approaches Alison with a hello. Alison asks if she knows her, to which Mona mysteriously responds no, but Alison will. Ali then approaches Jenna. She offers to befriend her, thereby making Jenna's popularity in Rosewood a sure thing. However, Jenna turns her down and says that she likes to pick her own friends. When Jenna saunters away victoriously, Mona declares her the best Gaga, and the two introduce themselves, seeming to start a friendship.

Outside on the porch, a sulky Ali jealously calls Jenna a slut and hands Spencer the ballots of incriminating evidence. Spencer burns them in a nearby fireplace without looking inside, though Ali cryptically tells her that she would be surprised to know who your friends aren't and suggestively glances Aria's and Hanna's way. Next, Hanna and Aria go in search of the bathroom. They follow the arrow on the sign at the edge of some woods that reads "Killer Drinks this way." As they move deeper into the bushes, they are scared by someone in a scary costume who creeps up on them. Then Emily is seen slow-dancing with Ben on the dance floor. Jenna is seductively dancing nearby, and Emily ogles at her moves and curves. Jenna notices this and smiles, causing Emily to smile uncertainly back. Alison turns her eyes from one to the other, approaches Emily, and alludes to her hidden sexual orientation. Emily looks frightened, and Alison lets her know that her secret is safe with her.

Some time later, Emily is sitting outside alone. Hanna joins her, wondering where Alison is. The other Liars join up, and they get a text that reads "I’m in trouble, come alone" from Ali, directing them to the scary house's address. So, they all hurry over there. Creepy person in burlap costume is there, but they don't see him/her, as he/she moves stealthily behind them. It's abandoned except for torn lace curtains and antique dolls in a corresponding dollhouse. They are startled to see a lonely suit hanging in the middle of a room, giving the appearance of someone being hanged with the shadow it casts. They find Ali in a locked room. Seemingly terrified, she recounts that someone grabbed her and brought her there threatening to kill her with a knife. Nobody can get a signal to dial 911 from their cell phones, so Ali goes out alone. Then she screams, but the door is now bolted and they can't open it. Through the keyhole they see a big fight with her and costumed guy with a knife. Ali knees him and runs off, the Liars get out through a conveniently open window. They go back in the house, and Ali is rocking in a chair, brandishing a knife and looking completely insane, but she says it was all a hoax. Noel was the zombie, the blood was ketchup (which she meanly offers to a tearing Hanna), and they "passed the test." Spencer is the only who can voice her betrayed feelings at Alison's dumb joke, but she unabashedly counters that she now knows that she can count on them as her friends when she needs them. They all look really annoyed and betrayed by Alison's crying wolf, but are silent.

Back at the party, there seems to be mostly college kids now. Apparently, Noel's older brother and his friends decided to join the party. Ian is there with Melissa in their Bonnie and Clyde costumes. Alison approaches Ian and flirtatiously strikes up a conversation with him. But, Melissa cuts her off by spinning Ian around and planting a kiss on his lips. Disgruntled, Ali walks back to her friends. Noel then approaches Ali to apologize, but she tells him it was perfect—but then realizes he's apologizing because he didn't make it to the plot; he was stuck at the party, not because he had been too rough with her. Now Alison is taken aback. Who was it then? Suddenly, a guy in an identical costume, brushes past Alison and mutters "bitch." Alison looks offended, and the guy takes off his mask as he walks away, revealing that he is Lucas. Then, Alison gets a text: "Dying to know who I am? You’ll find out. –A." When Aria questions the text, Alison calls it "a secret." The scene then reveals several other people wearing identical masks and burlap costumes. Someone a few paces away suspensefully takes off his/her mask, but the face is not shown.

== Reception ==
=== Critical response ===
Teresa Lopez of TV Fanatic gave the episode a 4 out of 5 stars rating, commenting: "This flashback episode wasn't really meant to unravel the mysteries of the show, but it did give us some interesting peeks into life in Rosewood prior to Ali's untimely death and "A's" reign of terror. Plus, there were lots of spooky dolls".

=== Ratings ===
The First Secret was broadcast on October 19, 2011. It was watched by 2.47 million viewers, scoring a 1.0 rating in the 18-49 demographic.
