= Riley and the Roxies =

- Also known as: Spencer Riley
- Born: Spencer Riley Alfonso
- Origin: Los Angeles, California, United States
- Genres: Indie rock; alternative rock
- Occupation(s): Musician, producer
- Years active: 2011–present
- Labels: Secret Road Music Services
- Website: facebook.com/RileyandtheRoxies

Riley and the Roxies is a musical project by recording artist and producer Spencer Riley (born Spencer Riley Alfonso). The band originated in Los Angeles, California, and Riley's music has been featured in various television shows, including ABC Family's Pretty Little Liars and MTV's Underemployed.

== History ==
=== Early years ===
Riley's interest in music began in fourth grade when he began playing the drums with his friends. In high school, Riley led a band called Riley. The band later changed its name to Riley and the Roxies, inspired by the Roxy Theatre in Los Angeles, California, where they frequently performed. Riley retained the name after the band disbanded when its other members left for college.

In addition to his work as Riley and the Roxies, Spencer Riley has also co-written songs with Trent Dabbs, Jules Larson, Mariah McManus, Pilar Diaz, Bess Rogers, and Wes Period.

=== 2013-present ===
In 2013, Riley and the Roxies signed with Secret Road Music Services. In the same year, Riley and the Roxies released an EP, Lola, on Noisetrade and YouTube. As of 2023, Riley and the Roxies is no longer featured on Secret Road's roster list of artists.

== Musical styles and influences ==
Riley and the Roxies has been described as a cross between California and New York rock and roll, drawing inspiration from 1960s garage rock, Motown, and the roots rockers of the late 1970s and early 1980s. Among the acts cited by Spencer Riley as musical influences, are Elvis Costello, Prince, and Bruce Springsteen.

== Discography ==
- Lola - EP (2013)
- A Winter Romance - EP (2011)
- OceanGold - EP (2011)
- The Lovers in Spain - EP (2011)
