= Pretty Little Liars season 3 =

Pretty Little Liars
- Season 3
- Season 3 DVD cover
- Starring: Troian Bellisario; Ashley Benson; Tyler Blackburn; Holly Marie Combs; Lucy Hale; Ian Harding; Laura Leighton; Chad Lowe; Shay Mitchell; Janel Parrish; Sasha Pieterse
- No. of episodes: 24

Release
- Original network: ABC Family
- Original release: June 5, 2012 – March 19, 2013

Season chronology
- ← Previous; Season 2 Next → Season 4

The third season of Pretty Little Liars, based on the books of the same name by Sara Shepard, premiered on June 5, 2012, on ABC Family and concluded on March 19, 2013. On November 29, 2011, ABC Family renewed the series for a third season, consisting of 24 episodes.

On October 4, 2012, ABC Family renewed the series for a fourth season, consisting of 24 episodes.

== Overview ==
The third season takes place five months following the discovery that Mona Vanderwaal (Janel Parrish) was the elusive "A" that had been creatively and relentlessly tormenting the four main characters, Aria Montgomery (Lucy Hale), Spencer Hastings (Troian Bellisario), Hanna Marin (Ashley Benson), and Emily Fields (Shay Mitchell) for the past year. The first half of the season addresses the issue of whether or not Garrett Reynolds (Yani Gellman) actually killed or was involved in the murder of the girls' former friend and queen bee, Alison DiLaurentis (Sasha Pieterse) and who killed Maya St. Germain (Bianca Lawson) in the season two finale, while the second half deals with the reveal that Toby Cavanaugh (Keegan Allen) is a member of the A-Team. While dealing with Maya's death Emily finds comfort with Paige McCullers (Lindsey Shaw) and the two enter a relationship. The girls see the arrival of CeCe Drake (Vanessa Ray) to Rosewood, a sister like figure to Alison. Spencer discovering the information about Toby sends her on a dark path, until Mona fakes Toby's death, which sends Spencer completely over the edge, leading to her being admitted to Radley.

All this time, the girls continue to see Red Coat, a mysterious blonde in a red trench coat who is believed to be the leader of the A-Team. Mona visits Spencer at Radley and offers her the chance to join the A-Team, which Spencer, who wants answers on Toby, accepts. Spencer is released from Radley and comes home, but is unbeknownst to the girls, working with Mona/"A" to set up a party so that Red Coat can meet them all. As promised, Mona arranges Spencer a meeting with Toby, who is alive and well and reveals that he joined the A-Team to keep Spencer safe. Spencer and Toby then begin working on the inside to discover Red Coat's identity at the party. Red Coat flies in on a plane and Spencer and Toby go into the woods to watch her, while the girls corner Mona, as someone locks them inside the Lodge and sets it on fire. Spencer loses Red Coat in the woods, as the Lodge burns down with the girls inside. Hanna, unconscious, wakes up briefly, as she is pulled out of the Lodge by Red Coat, whom she sees as Alison DiLaurentis.

== Cast ==
=== Main cast ===
- Troian Bellisario as Spencer Hastings
- Ashley Benson as Hanna Marin
- Tyler Blackburn as Caleb Rivers
- Holly Marie Combs as Ella Montgomery
- Lucy Hale as Aria Montgomery
- Ian Harding as Ezra Fitz
- Laura Leighton as Ashley Marin
- Chad Lowe as Byron Montgomery
- Shay Mitchell as Emily Fields
- Janel Parrish as Mona Vanderwaal
- Sasha Pieterse as Alison DiLaurentis

=== Recurring cast ===
- Keegan Allen as Toby Cavanaugh
- Lindsey Shaw as Paige McCullers
- Bryce Johnson as Darren Wilden
- Julian Morris as Wren Kingston
- Tammin Sursok as Jenna Marshall
- Torrey DeVitto as Melissa Hastings
- Lesley Fera as Veronica Hastings
- Drew Van Acker as Jason DiLaurentis
- Edward Kerr as Ted Wilson
- Sterling Sulieman as Lyndon James/"Nate St. Germain
- Vanessa Ray as CeCe Drake
- Brendan Robinson as Lucas Gottesman
- Nia Peeples as Pam Fields
- Yani Gellman as Garrett Reynolds

=== Guest cast ===
- Bianca Lawson as Maya St. Germain
- Missy Franklin as herself
- Adam Lambert as himself
- Amanda Schull as Meredith Sorenson
- Gregg Sulkin as Wesley Fitzgerald
- Téo Briones as Malcolm Cutler
- Aeriél Miranda as Shana Fring
- Brant Daugherty as Noel Kahn
- Steve Talley as Zack
- Larisa Oleynik as Maggie Cutler
- Bernard Curry as Jamie Doyle
- Jim Titus as Officer Barry Maple
- Annabeth Gish as Anne Sullivan
- Mary Page Keller as Dianne Fitzgerald
- Brandon W. Jones as Andrew Campbell
- Reggie Austin as Eddie Lamb
- Andrew Elvis Miller as Miles Corwin
- Nolan North as Peter Hastings
- Jim Abele as Kenneth DiLaurentis
- Robbie Amell as Eric Kahn
- Flynn Morrison as Malcolm
- Alexander Nifong as Sam

== Episodes ==
No. overall	No. in season	Title	Directed by	Written by	Original release date	U.S. viewers (millions)
48	1	"It Happened 'That Night'"	Ron Lagomarsino	I. Marlene King	June 5, 2012	2.93
Five months after Mona revealed as 'A,' the Liars are drinking at a slumber party, talking about their summer before they begin their senior year of high school. Emily, who is grieving Maya, drinks too much alcohol and goes missing. The girls find Emily at Alison's grave holding a shovel, they find that Alison's body is missing from the coffin and the girls then promise to keep this a secret. They dispose of all evidence connecting them to that night including all of Emily's clothes. Hanna secretly begins visiting Mona at the Radley institute. The doctor encourages her visits, though the girls think she's crazy when they find out. Spencer visits Garrett in jail, who asks for her mom to be his lawyer, in return for information about Alison's body and implies 'A' is not gone. The girls return to Mona's lair to find it empty. As Spencer's car alarm goes off outside, they rush out and all four girls receive a text from a new 'A' and see photos taken of them when they were set up at Ali's grave.
49	2	"Blood Is the New Black"	Norman Buckley	Oliver Goldstick	June 12, 2012	2.66
Emily struggles to complete a make-up test for English, but Ella completes it and gives her a good grade. Garrett tells Spencer someone has them all fooled, that medical records don't lie. Hanna is still seeing Mona, who is still catatonic. Caleb confronts Hanna who tells him that she's been visiting Mona and they go visiting her together. Mona asks Hanna if she is getting texts again but doesn't answer to any further questions from Hanna. The Liars catch Jenna looking at the earring they planted in the girls' bathroom at school. Jenna is not blind and they decide to keep quiet about this so that they can possibly use her secret against her later. 'A' ending: Red Coat is seen buying black hoodies and gloves for her workers. The store owner says to Red Coat, "So, are you buying this for a team?"
50	3	"Kingdom of the Blind"	Chad Lowe	Joseph Dougherty	June 19, 2012	2.44
Lucas starts acting out at school. Melissa is back in town. Veronica tells her daughters that she's defending Garrett because she knows what it's like to have a child accused of something they didn't do. Hanna visits Mona who appears happier and more alert. The Liars think Jenna is pressing Aria to find out how much Emily remembers from "that night". Spencer is convinced Melissa is the reason her mother is defending Garrett. Hanna wonders if perhaps Ian isn't the father of Melissa's baby, but Garrett is. Caleb visits Mona and reads her the riot act. Lucas tells Hanna that Mona may be faking her mental illness as a "get out of jail free" card. The Liars discover Melissa lied about the hospital and was also threatened by "A." When the Liars confront Jenna, she tells them she's been able to see from the first operation because "it was the only protection I had." 'A' ending: 'A' pours themself a drink as they are making another necklace, and puts the vodka bottle in the freezer next to a bodybag.
51	4	"Birds of a Feather"	Roger Kumble	Story by : Michael J. Cinquemani; Teleplay by : Jonell Lennon	June 26, 2012	2.36
Hanna is told by a nurse that Mona has lost her visitation privileges. Maya's cousin Nate drops by to see Emily at work. Caleb tells Hanna about Mona's screaming fit when he went to threaten her. Hanna tells Caleb to stay out of it. At Radley, Wilden shows Wren a court order saying he's allowed to see Mona. Nate tells Emily that Maya told him Emily was her first real love. Wren tells Hanna that Wilden is asking Mona about Alison's remains. Spencer decides to go to Philly and dig up more info about Melissa and her baby. Ashley gets a notice from her dating profile about a possible date. The Liars go to Melissa's apartment to search for her medical records while Spencer distracts her. In a garment bag, they find what looks like a feather that matches the feather the girls got from the Black Swan dress. Caleb tells Hanna that his mother was in a car accident in Montecito which was before revealed in a text by "A". Caleb breaks up with Hanna, tired of all her secrets. Ella tells Aria she knows about Byron seeing Meredith again, but is fine with it. Spencer confronts Melissa and she reveals that she was the Black Swan and that she lost the baby the day after she found Ian's body. She wore the costume because she received instructions from "A" to do so or they would reveal her fake pregnancy. 'A' ending: 'A' is at the airport, hacking the system of Radley Sanitarium allowing Mona to have visitors.
52	5	"That Girl Is Poison"	Chad Lowe	Bryan M. Holdman	July 10, 2012	2.38
Aria sees Lucas pounding on the door to get into a photography studio and the girls wonder if perhaps he took the photos at the graveyard. Spencer tells Emily that Garrett is being released to see his mother. Jenna, who has openly revealed she can see again, walks over and hands them invites for her birthday party. Emily's boss is making her work Jenna's birthday party, despite her being a guest. Ezra texts Aria that he's been invited to Jenna's party, prompting Spencer to question the purpose of Jenna's party. Jenna starts flirting with Nate. Ashley meets a man named Ted at the rummage sale and they hit it off. When Hanna starts volunteering to help Ashley, she finds a piece of Emily clothes that she was wearing "that night" Spencer spies on Garrett at the hospital. Spencer sees Garrett writing a card for his mother's flowers. A drunken Paige starts embarrassing herself, eventually falling over and hitting her head. Emily and Nate take Paige to the hospital. Paige comes out with a few stitches but doesn't remember anything. A tox screen found traces of a sleeping pill in her system. Paige gives Emily back the flask. Emily realizes she was drugged 'that night.' Spencer goes into Garrett mother's room and reads the card with the flowers: April Rose has the proof. Aria finds the same pills used to drug Paige and Emily in Lucas' camera bag. 'A' ending: 'A' goes through Maya's purse, finding different things belonging to Maya.
53	6	"The Remains of the 'A'"	Norman Buckley	Maya Goldsmith	July 17, 2012	2.27
Garrett's case may be closed due to lack of evidence. Ted invites Hanna to a "Thank You" party for all the volunteers at the church. Jason tells Spencer he found April Rose - not a person, but an antique shop. Hanna and Toby arrive at the church party while Spencer and Jason arrive at the antique shop. Aria finds thousands of dollars in Ezra's sock drawer while he's in the bathroom. Spencer finds an anklet that belonged to Alison that had gone missing. Emily arrives at the party and sees Holden. Emily sees the same eye tattoo from her flashback on his wrist. Holden shows her that it is erasable and it is for some sort of club/party. Holden tells Emily that he used to see Maya there. Emily tells Hanna about her conversation with Holden. Spencer's father tells her that an important evidence in the Garrett Reynolds case was turned in last night, and he knows she turned it in. It turns out the police have been looking for the anklet for two years. Traces of Alison's blood was found on it, along with someone else's blood. Then, Spencer receives the following text message: Hey Spence, I have one more surprise for you. Garrett isn't their killer. -A 'A' ending: 'A' looks at rooms for rent in the newspaper and calls a number.
54	7	"Crazy"	Patrick Norris	Andy Reaser	July 24, 2012	2.43
Detective Wilden is on the case. He thinks Hanna is guilty since her blood type matches the blood found on the anklet. Aria makes a trip to Radley to see if she can get Mona to crack about her possible co-conspirators. Shortly after Aria leaves, Hanna decides they should break back in to try to talk to Mona alone without a chaperone around. Mona leads them into the abandoned children's wing of Radley where she hums to herself repeating the same thing over and over again. Hanna realizes later on that Mona was trying to tell them through a code that someone's "NOT SAFE", that "MAYA KNEW", and the address to Maya's website (MAS Sugar) which the girls did not know about. The girls meet a girl named CeCe who reminds them a lot of Ali. It turns out that CeCe and Alison were friends and she used to date Jason. Spencer sees Jason's car crashed into a tree. She drives him home and leaves her car at the scene of the accident. When the cops knock at Spencer's door, she and Toby lie to protect Jason, though Toby does not understand yet. When Spencer explains, Toby becomes frustrated and leaves. 'A' ending: 'A' picks up a recorder which was in one of the dolls, and it has recorded the conversation between Mona, Aria and Hanna.
55	8	"Stolen Kisses"	Zetna Fuentes	Joseph Dougherty	July 31, 2012	2.22
Byron tells Aria that Meredith got the teaching job at Rosewood High. Emily and Nate go to the old boat House, Maya's favorite spot in Rosewood. Toby is still angry with Spencer. Paige tells Emily that she was with her a part of the time when she was drunk on "that night". Spencer is looking for help about getting into Maya's site, and goes to Caleb. Meanwhile, Wren tells Hanna that Mona might be moved to a facility in Saratoga for added security because the hospital thinks she's been passing her meds to a visitor. Hanna is forced to convince the board to let Mona stay in Rosewood. Spencer and Aria think that Veronica is trying to hide evidence that Garrett has killed Maya. Caleb helps Spencer with Maya's site and is able to hack into it. Aria meets Dianne Fitzgerald, Ezra's mother, who doesn't approve of Aria's family's reputation and tells Aria that she is responsible for ruining Ezra's career. Spencer, Aria, and Hanna watch random videos from Maya's website. Emily is in many of the videos. In one video, Maya says that she has to face her fears. 'A' ending: 'A' collects a large sum of money from the bank.
56	9	"The Kahn Game"	Wendey Stanzler	Lijah J. Barasz	August 7, 2012	2.45
Aria shows Spencer a photo of Maya's arm with the same black eye tattoo that Holden had. Caleb gives Hanna a piece of paper with the log-in information for Maya's site. After Caleb leaves, Hanna gets a text saying "The Apple Rose Grille at closing time. Go alone or Caleb pays -A" Hanna confesses to Emily about having been able to hack into Maya's website a few days ago. Hanna gives Emily the log-in information to see for herself. CeCe, Aria, and Spencer arrive at a party, which turns out to be at Noel Kahn's cabin. Once they try to get into the party, Aria and Spencer see that they have to get stamped with the same black eye tattoo that Holden and Maya had on their wrists. Tension rises when Aria and Spencer face-off against Noel and Jenna, respectively, in a game of "Truth." The police have a court order that demands for Hanna to take a sample of her blood to see if it matches with the blood from Alison's anklet. Ashley rekindles her relationship with Ted. While Hanna goes to the Apple Rose Grille as told by "A," Hanna runs into Caleb who reveals that he sent her the "A" text to see if she would come. Hanna spills everything that happened with the new "A" and Caleb insists that he helps. Wes, Ezra's brother, tells Aria that Ezra got a girl named Maggie pregnant in high school. Aria confronts Ezra about this and she also tells him that his mother offered her money to end their relationship. 'A' ending: 'A' receives a key from a cat obsessed woman to a unit A.
57	10	"What Lies Beneath"	Patrick Norris	Jonell Lennon	August 14, 2012	2.27
Aria continues to question Ezra about his past with Maggie. Ella begins dating Zack, the owner of the Rear Window Brew where Emily works. Hanna tells Emily that Caleb knows about "A" and now they are pretending to not be together. Emily finds two pictures of Maya in the daytime with a sign behind her and when she puts them together, it says "The Kahn's." Spencer talks to Noel and he says that she wasn't just a random guest and that they had a texting relationship. Paige stops by the coffee shop and Emily tells her to stop by her house later so they can watch a movie. Spencer sneaks into the boy's locker room and breaks into Noel's locker and checks his phone for texts from Maya. Emily and Hanna go to the Kahn's cabin to investigate. While searching the cabin, Hanna finds a hidden door and inside, she determines that Maya must have been staying in the secret room. Emily and Hanna find Maya's bag filled with personal belongings. "A" comes and locks Emily and Hanna inside the cabin. Spencer gets a new email from BLOCKED saying "Stay out of my locker!" and a video from the security camera at the cabin the night that Maya died. Later, after they manage to escape, Emily finds Nate sitting on the steps in front of her house. After Emily shows him the bag of Maya's things, Nate starts to cry and kisses Emily when she tries to comfort him. Paige walks by, sees them, and cancels her date with Emily. Spencer discovers in the video that Maya arrived at the cabin at 10:04PM. At 1:14AM, Noel and Jenna arrive at the cabin. A few seconds after Noel and Jenna enter the cabin, Maya exits the cabin and is grabbed by a mysterious figure in the driveway. 'A' ending: 'A' watches the news as they're hanging up black hoodies.
58	11	"Single Fright Female"	Joanna Kerns	Oliver Goldstick & Maya Goldsmith	August 21, 2012	2.39
Ted comes to Hanna's house with a flash drive that contains the N.A.T videos, which was left in the church, rather than Ian taking it. CeCe reveals Alison's and Paige's violent past to Spencer. CeCe tells Spencer that Alison may have been scared of Paige. Later, Spencer is attacked by a snake in the dressing room, but is rescued by CeCe. Emily calls Hanna and says that the knife they found in Maya's bag is missing, though the bag is still there. Hanna and Spencer help CeCe with the boutique's trunk show while Emily shows up with Paige. Spencer and Hanna search through Paige's bag for Maya's knife. Aria visits Maggie and realizes that she has a seven-year old son, Malcolm. Emily realizes that Spencer and Hanna have gone through Paige's purse. She leaves upset with Paige. However, Spencer and Hanna have found the proof they needed - the earring from Ali's grave. They think that Paige dug up Ali's grave and may be "A". Paige confesses to Emily that at one point, Alison's bullying drove her to suicidal thoughts. Hanna's mom destroys the N.A.T. videos, but Hanna tells Ted that she did it. When Paige goes inside Emily's house, Jenna appears and warns Emily to be very careful who she spends time with. 'A' ending: 'A' plays on the jukebox as they hand over a key to another black-gloved 'A'.
59	12	"The Lady Killer"	Ron Lagomarsino	I. Marlene King	August 28, 2012	2.98
Garrett's trial starts. Emily is at odds with her friends who suspect Paige is "A." Toby and Spencer have sex. Mona escapes Radley. Maggie visits Ezra, making Aria uncomfortable. "A" sends a text to the Liars, telling them to meet at Ali's grave at the Rosewood Cemetery at 10pm with Maya's bag, but without Emily. Emily tells Paige about the new "A." Paige receives a text from "A," telling her come to the Rosewood Cemetery at 10pm. Emily and Nate head up to the Lighthouse Inn. She gets a call from "A," in a distorted voice, who says, "You have one minute. Get out." It is revealed that Nate is Maya's killer and that his real name is Lyndon James. Lyndon opens a closet revealing a bound Paige and tells Emily he is planning to kill Paige using the knife from Maya's bag. Emily escapes and reaches the top of the lighthouse where she fights Lyndon and ultimately fatally stabs him in self-defense. Caleb arrives and puts his gun down to comfort Emily, but as they embrace, a dying Lyndon uses the last of his strength to shoot Caleb. Paige tells the police that someone had sent her a text telling her to go to Alison's grave at the cemetery, but Lyndon had gotten her before she could get there. Caleb survives his shooting and undergoing surgery, but Lyndon is dead. Spencer lets Paige know that she is sorry for thinking she was "A." Veronica tells the girls that Garrett is now a free man thanks to Emily. The girls get a four-way call from "A," saying "Emily, I owe you one." In conclusion, the second "A" Team member is revealed: Toby Cavanaugh. 'A' ending: 'A' orders two tickets to the Halloween Train event.
60	13	"This Is a Dark Ride"	Tim Hunter	Joseph Dougherty	October 23, 2012	2.85
In this special Halloween episode, the Liars are unable to enjoy the festivities for a Rosewood train excursion when it becomes apparent that "A" is on the train and out for blood. Adam Lambert performs live. Someone disguised as the Queen of Hearts spikes Aria's drink while she sits and rests in-between Adam's sets. Garrett corners Spencer and reveals to her that he made Jenna think that he killed Alison, but it was a ruse. Garrett also mentions he overheard Alison and Byron having a conversation in her backyard and Alison was blackmailing Byron. Hanna dances with a masked figure she believes to be Caleb, but eventually realizes it isn't him - this person is later revealed to be Mona, who has evidently snuck out of Radley. Spencer tells Garrett to stay put while she goes to retrieve Aria for Garrett to tell her this information. Unfortunately, Aria is nowhere to be found. Paige, Emily, Hanna, Caleb, Spencer and Toby search the train for Aria. It is revealed to the home viewers that Aria is bound and gagged with duct tape, is trapped in a box with the now dead corpse of Garrett Reynolds. As the search progresses, Spencer is attacked by a someone wearing a queen of hearts costume. The Queen of Hearts almost chokes Spencer to death, but Paige thwarts off this mystery attacker. Spencer thanks her. We hear voices as the box Aria is trapped in is pushed towards the edge of the train. Aria stabs someone with a screwdriver she finds in the box. She is soon after rescued by her friends. When the train stops, Noel and Toby fight and Toby pushes Noel against a prop casket. The casket is knocked over and a body bag covered in ice spills out. The final scene shows a flashback of the night Alison died, showing the construction of her backyard, the place Alison was buried alive. Moments later, a hand comes out of the ground, wearing a purple string bracelet, attempting to get out.
61	14	"She's Better Now"	Wendey Stanzler	Oliver Goldstick	January 8, 2013	3.21
Mona is out of Radley and back at Rosewood High. The Liars do not trust Mona. Someone plants a cow brain in Mona's locker kept up with a knife. Mona is appalled and whispers something to Lucas. The Liars worry that people will think they were involved, including Mona, who instantly assures them she believes them, and wants to earn back their trust. When Lucas goes to Hanna's house later to return the rest of the money he owed Caleb, he tells Hanna that Mona had been sneaking out of Radley for a long time. Emily recognizes the new janitor as the front desk clerk from the Lost Woods Resort. The Liars investigate his office during the fundraiser and find Alison's diary. Proof of Alison's blackmail against Byron is found in the diary. Aria rips out that page and keeps it. Mona regains trust from the school when she posts an apology video on the school's website with help from Jason DiLaurentis. Meredith, now the Liars new history teacher, is injured in a fire at the fundraiser. 'A' ending: 'A' is seen fiddling with someone's bike wheel, to which the owner falls off afterwards.
62	15	"Mona-Mania"	Norman Buckley	Bryan M. Holdman	January 15, 2013	2.48
Aria remains suspicious of Byron. Mona tells the Liars that Harold, the janitor, has pursued her and she declined his sexual advances. They doubt her honesty. When the girls go back to investigate Harold's office further, a hooded figure rushes out. Hanna recognizes the person's shoes - it is Lucas. Lucas tells her he was looking for something but when Hanna offers to help him, he blows her off. Andrew Campbell proctors as Mona and Spencer face-off for team captain of the scholastic decathlon. Mona wins and Hanna shuns her for it, suspecting that her intentions continue to be sinister. On the way to a swim team party, Emily and Paige chase after a hooded figure after their car tires are slashed. Aria confronts Meredith about Byron's involvement with Alison on the night of her murder. Mona follows Byron late at night at Hollis and makes a mysterious phone call. 'A' ending: 'A' buries the Queen of Hearts and the Phantom of the Opera masks in the wood.
63	16	"Misery Loves Company"	I. Marlene King	I. Marlene King & Jonell Lennon	January 22, 2013	2.68
Aria is sidelined by the flu and Meredith takes care of her while Byron is away. Mona and Toby plan their next "A" move against the Liars in the new "A" lair. Spencer takes a break from sleuthing to surprise Toby for their first anniversary. While fading in and out of consciousness, Aria is visited by Ali. Their brief conversation is ambiguous. When Aria comes to, she discovers that she is locked inside her bedroom. When Meredith checks on Aria, Aria realizes that Meredith has been drugging her to find a page from Ali's diary. Aria makes her escape, but Meredith knocks Aria unconscious. Hanna arrives at her interview and finds it is a set-up by "A." When Hanna goes to the boutique, she sees in the window reflection a blonde girl wearing a red coat (the same color as Vivian's jacket) across the street, watching her. When Hanna turns around, Red Coat has disappeared. While making an escape, "A" haphazardly drops a key, which Hanna gives to Spencer. When Emily and Hanna go over to check on Aria, Meredith tricks them by locking them in the basement with an unconscious Aria. Byron returns, appalled by what Meredith has done. Byron confesses his involvements with Alison to Aria. Aria believes him and burns the page from Ali's diary. Spencer tricks Toby and catches him in the black hoodie when he searches for the "A" key in Spencer's kitchen. Spencer is left heartbroken and confused.
64	17	"Out of the Frying Pan, Into the Inferno"	Michael Grossman	Maya Goldsmith	January 29, 2013	2.86
In Alison's biology notebook, Emily, Aria, and Hanna discover a conversation between Alison and a friend where Alison talks about a "beach hottie." Emily turns to CeCe for answers about the beach hottie but CeCe claims Ali never told her who it was. Spencer continues to struggle with the idea that Toby is on the "A" Team. "A" sends Spencer a text as Aria and leads Spencer to believe that Ezra broke up with Aria when he finds out that Aria knew about his son with Maggie. Spencer confronts Ezra who is unaware that he has a son. Emily asks Hanna to keep an eye on Paige when she starts acting weird. Hanna follows Paige to a lesbian bar and assumes the worst when she sees Paige and Shana having a friendly conversation. CeCe tells Emily that Ali thought she was pregnant during the summer they spent in Cape May. Later, Emily sees a picture of Wilden at the police station indicating that he was also in Cape May that summer with Ali and CeCe. Ezra heads to Delaware to meet his son for the first time and asks Aria not to call him. 'A' ending: In the new "A" lair, Red Coat uses a blow torch to burn a bobblehead Hanna doll.
65	18	"Dead to Me"	Arlene Sanford	Joseph Dougherty & Lijah J. Barasz	February 5, 2013	2.75
While Ezra is away, Aria discovers that Ezra's brother, Wes, was placed under academic suspension for hitting on his physics teacher and Mrs. Fitzgerald tried to cover it up. On a final trip to Caleb's aunt's house before it is sold, Hanna determines that Caleb's uncle may actually be his biological father. Emily seeks Dr. Sullivan to help her deal with confounding emotions over killing someone in self-defense. Dr. Sullivan suggests hypnotherapy, which results in confusing Emily further. The private investigator Spencer hired to follow Toby tells her that he traced the "A" key to a single unit, but it turns out to be a dead end. Jason, Aria, Emily, and Hanna gather at the mausoleum to say a final goodbye to Ali after the police release Ali's remains to the DiLaurentis family. Spencer rushes in shortly afterward and spills the beans to Jason about Ali being pregnant with Detective Wilden's child at the time of her murder. Emily recalls seeing a person in a black hoodie digging up Ali's grave and abducting Emily. Emily remembers more of what happened "That Night". She remembers seeing Red Coat while being attacked by a member of the "A-Team." She remembers that Red Coat had blonde hair. Emily says that she (Red Coat) is the one in charge. 'A' ending: 'A' buys whiskey in a store.
66	19	"What Becomes of the Broken-Hearted"	Ron Lagomarsino	Oliver Goldstick & Francesca Rollins	February 12, 2013	2.41
Spencer continues on a downward spiral from her break-up with Toby. Andrew Campbell kicks Spencer off the scholastic decathlon. Emily tries to talk to Spencer but Spencer refuses. Hanna talks to Jamie and gets confirmation that he is Caleb's biological father. Hanna persuades Jamie and Caleb to meet in Rosewood. Hanna also convinces Ashley to talk to Ted about hiring Jamie for the church restoration project. Jason and Emily search his dad's office for photos of Ali and Wilden, proving they were together in Cape May. After Wes and Aria arrive to help CeCe with a photo shoot at her boutique, CeCe leaves to get dinner. CeCe calls them later and lies about her car being towed. Later, Wes kisses Aria when she invites him to sleep on her couch. Jason and Emily find a picture that reveals Ali standing between Wilden and CeCe. They take the picture on their way out, but they get trapped in an elevator. Emily escapes, but Jason does not and plummets to the ground. At the hospital, Jason tells Emily he lost the picture. As the girls reunite at the hospital, they discover Jason has disappeared. 'A' ending: 'A' plays "spin the bottle" with pictures of the liars on whiskey bottles, to which the flask points on Aria, but another 'A' turns it to Spencer and the 'A's drink the whiskey.
67	20	"Hot Water"	Chad Lowe	Andy Reaser	February 19, 2013	2.61
The hunt is on for discovering the identity of the girl in the red coat. Hanna comes clean to Ashley about knowing CeCe and that she and her friends found out about an illicit relationship between Ali and Wilden. Spencer accepts a dinner date from Wren. Afterward, they share a kiss outside the restaurant and are seen by the mystery girl in the red coat. Spencer tries to follow her but loses sight of her after turning a corner. Mrs. Fitzgerald continues to try to come between Aria and Ezra. Paige, Emily and Hanna go to the Rosewood Costume Shop looking for answers from Shana. When Spencer returns home, she heads into the steam shower and gets trapped by "A." Having received a text from Spencer earlier asking her to come over, Aria comes to her rescue. Once safe, Spencer tells Aria to call Emily and Hanna because she knows who is helping Mona. Emily goes to CeCe's apartment and finds her packing to leave Rosewood. Before she leaves, CeCe tells Emily that Melissa took the picture of Ali, Wilden and CeCe in Cape May and that she is not completely sure about what is true about Ali and Wilden. Wilden threatens Ashley and Hanna. Ashley runs over Wilden with her car. She and Hanna return to the scene of the crime and find Wilden's body missing. Ashley and Hanna are caught on film, oblivious to the camera in Wilden's car recording them. 'A' ending: 'A' cuts up pink roses, and puts them in a lowery wreath with a ribbon which says "With Deepest Sympathy".
68	21	"Out of Sight, Out of Mind"	Melanie Mayron	Jonell Lennon	February 26, 2013	2.71
Spencer reveals to Aria and Emily that Toby is helping Mona. Aria returns to Ezra's apartment to find he has returned...with Maggie and Malcolm. Emily and Hanna arrive at Toby's apartment and find a parking pass with the name "E. Lamb," Toby's alias for Radley. Spencer receives a bouquet of flowers and a card that reads: Someone close to you will pay for your loose lips -A. Later, Emily goes to Toby's place again and talks to a guy who worked with Toby. He says Toby left but never said where he was going. While Aria babysits Malcolm, he accidentally cuts his chin. Aria worries she may not be a fit parent and contemplates breaking up with Ezra until he gets everything sorted out. Spencer follows Mona heading into the woods. Spencer finds a body in the woods with Toby's tattoo on his hip wearing a helmet. Mona yells "he's dead" before Spencer identifies the body. She chases Mona but loses sight of her. Hours later, Emily is waiting for Toby after he texted her to meet up but Toby doesn't show. Emily catches a glimpse of the girl in the red coat in her rear view mirror. Hanna and Aria push Wilden's car into Lake Rosewood after it shows up in Hanna's garage with footage of the night Ashley hit him. Spencer is found the next morning in the woods, completely catatonic. She is admitted to Radley. 'A' ending: 'A' watches a man fishing up a cap from the Rosewood Police.
69	22	"Will the Circle Be Unbroken?"	Ron Lagomarsino	Joseph Dougherty	March 5, 2013	2.56
Spencer is held at Radley for a 72-hour observation and assessment. Spencer befriends a male nurse. She notices the name on his badge, E. Lamb, is identical to Toby's alias for Radley. E. Lamb tells Spencer that Radley has experienced a recent dilemma involving staff I.D. badges and visitor guest passes. Hanna and Ashley are blindsided when Detective Wilden approaches them at the church where they are meeting Ted for coffee. Emily is surprised when Shana invites her to coffee, only to introduce her to Olympic gold medalist Missy Franklin. Emily learns that Shana is also a swimmer, which Paige neglected to tell her. Aria lies about her relationship with Ezra in order for him to be reinstated at Rosewood High. Mona pays Spencer a visit in Radley and offers her a spot on the "A" Team for the second time. Ashley says goodbye to Hanna and heads to New York for an annual seminar. As Ashley drives away, Wilden pulls up in his car. Wilden confronts Hanna and demands to know where his car and keys are. Wilden promises not to bother Hanna and Ashley anymore as long as Hanna complies with his demand. During a group therapy session at Radley with Dr. Sullivan and other patients, Spencer confides that her friends can no longer count on her. 'A' ending: 'A' drives off in a RV with things from 'A's lair.
70	23	"I'm Your Puppet"	Oliver Goldstick	Oliver Goldstick & Maya Goldsmith	March 12, 2013	2.41
The girls visit Spencer in Radley who is convinced she saw Toby's body in the woods. But the girls know the police have identified that the body Spencer saw was not Toby. Spencer discovers a map of Radley that Mona created on a board game. Ella warns Hanna that Jamie may have traded the bell from the church for a new one of much lesser value. Aria, Emily and Hanna sneak into the morgue. Aria sees Red Coat while she, Hanna, and Emily are in the morgue posing as candy stripers. Aria follows her, almost catching her before she slips into an elevator and escapes, while Emily and Hanna find a dead body they are unable to identify. Aria is horrified when she discovers that "A" kidnapped Malcolm. When she finds Malcolm at a carnival, Aria decides this is too much for her and tries to break up with Ezra. Hanna and Caleb accuse Jamie of stealing from the church. Soon afterward, they discover that "A" has been framing Jamie. Emily's mom tells her that the police found another male body, late teens/early twenties, with no I.D. and that the police cannot identify the body yet due to significant trauma. Emily rushes to tell Aria and Hanna. At Radley, Spencer pulls out a black hoodie and two carnival tickets from her pillow. The third "A" Team member is revealed: Spencer Hastings.
71	24	"A DAngerous GAme"	Patrick Norris	I. Marlene King	March 19, 2013	2.87
Spencer is released from Radley. To celebrate, she invites her friends to a soirée. After receiving a clue from Malcolm while babysitting him, Hanna determines that Spencer was the one who kidnapped Malcolm. Aria, Emily, and Hanna band together to trick Spencer and find out her motives. Spencer finds Toby and they both determine that they each joined the "A" Team to protect one another and end up reconciling. When Spencer falls for their trap, she is forced to come clean with her friends about Toby, her "A" Team involvements, and Red Coat's plan for all four of them at the soirée. Emily catches Jenna, Melissa, and Shana conspiring something at Jenna's house. At the "soirée," the Liars confront Mona in the lodge while Toby and Spencer venture out to determine Red Coat's identity (still unknown to all three "A" Team members). However, someone traps the Liars with Mona in the lodge and sets it on fire, leaving them with no escape. Spencer sees Red Coat get out of the plane and at first glance, she thinks it's Alison. Toby is knocked unconscious in the woods and the mysterious figure drops a lighter by his hand, making him look responsible for starting the fire. Red Coat pulls the Liars and Mona out of the lodge. Hanna wakes up and sees Red Coat staring at her. Red Coat is revealed to be a very much alive Alison DiLaurentis. Mona says she saw Alison too. Spencer comes back and says she saw Alison also. On the way back to Rosewood, Mona reveals that Red Coat would sometimes wear a mask that looked like Alisons face. This means that Red Coat could have just looked like Alison. the Liars and Mona spot Wilden's car in front of the church. The video of Ashley running him over plays, with an added clip of Jenna and Shana dragging away his body. Spencer notices something "fishy" about the trunk. Before opening it, all five girls receive the same text that reads: 'You're mine now. Kisses -A'. Spencer opens the trunk and all five girls gasp in unison at the sight of its contents. In the final scene, a hand reaches out from the dirt and another grabs it and starts pulling the trapped person out.

== Ratings ==
=== Live + SD ratings ===
No. in series	No. in season	Episode	Air date	Time slot (EST)a	Rating/Share (18–49)	Viewers (m)	Rank (18-49)
48	1	"It Happened 'That Night'"	June 5, 2012	Tuesdays; 8:00 p.m.	1.1	2.93	12
49	2	"Blood is the New Black"	June 12, 2012	Tuesdays; 8:00 p.m.	1.1	2.66	13
50	3	"Kingdom of the Blind"	June 19, 2012	Tuesdays; 8:00 p.m.	1.0	2.44	14
51	4	"Bird of a Feather"	June 26, 2012	Tuesdays; 8:00 p.m.	1.0	2.36	17
52	5	"That Girl Is Poison"	July 10, 2012	Tuesdays; 8:00 p.m.	0.9	2.38	20
53	6	"The Remains of the 'A'"	July 17, 2012	Tuesdays; 8:00 p.m.	1.0	2.27	12
54	7	"Crazy"	July 24, 2012	Tuesdays; 8:00 p.m.	1.0	2.43	14
55	8	"Stolen Kisses"	July 31, 2012	Tuesdays; 8:00 p.m.	0.9	2.22	12
56	9	"The Kahn Game"	August 7, 2012	Tuesdays; 8:00 p.m.	1.0	2.45	9
57	10	"What Lies Beneath"	August 14, 2012	Tuesdays; 8:00 p.m.	0.9	2.27	13
58	11	"Single Fright Female"	August 21, 2012	Tuesdays; 8:00 p.m.	1.1	2.40	10
59	12	"The Lady Killer"	August 28, 2012	Tuesdays; 8:00 p.m.	1.3	2.98	6
60	13	"This Is a Dark Ride"	October 23, 2012	Tuesdays; 8:00 p.m.	1.2	2.85	8
61	14	"She's Better Now"	January 8, 2013	Tuesdays; 8:00 p.m.	1.4	3.21	6
62	15	"Mona-Mania"	January 15, 2013	Tuesdays; 8:00 p.m.	1.1	2.48	10
63	16	"Misery Loves Company"	January 22, 2013	Tuesdays; 8:00 p.m.	1.2	2.68	5
64	17	"Out of the Frying Pan, Into the Inferno"	January 29, 2013	Tuesdays; 8:00 p.m.	1.2	2.85	6
65	18	"Dead to Me"	February 5, 2013	Tuesdays; 8:00 p.m.	1.2	2.75	8
66	19	"What Becomes of the Broken-Hearted"	February 12, 2013	Tuesdays; 8:00 p.m.	1.1	2.41	11
67	20	"Hot Water"	February 19, 2013	Tuesdays; 8:00 p.m.	1.1	2.61	8
68	21	"Out of Sight, Out of Mind"	February 26, 2013	Tuesdays; 8:00 p.m.	1.2	2.71	6
69	22	"Will the Circle Be Unbroken?"	March 5, 2013	Tuesdays; 8:00 p.m.	1.2	2.56	6
70	23	"I'm Your Puppet"	March 12, 2013	Tuesdays; 8:00 p.m.	1.0	2.41	7
71	24	"A DAngerous GAme"	March 19, 2013	Tuesdays; 8:00 p.m.	1.2	2.87	4

== DVD release ==
The Complete Third Season
Set details			Special features
24 episodes; 1062 minutes (Region 1); 1018 minutes (Region 2); 1021 minutes (Region 4); 5-disc set; 1.85:1 aspect ratio; Languages: English (Dolby Digital 2.0 Surround); Subtitles: English, Spanish and French (Region 1); English, Spanish, Danish, French, Arabic, Dutch, Norwegian, Swedish, English for the Hearing Impaired (Regions 2 and 4)			Deleted scenes: Episodes: 2, 6, 8, 9, 10, 11, 12, 14, 15, 18, 21; Pretty Little Liars and the "A" Network - Who is "A"?; The Lady Killer Episode - Alternate endings; Bonus Webisodes - More Rosewood's secrets revealed!; Gag Reel
Release dates			Deleted scenes: Episodes: 2, 6, 8, 9, 10, 11, 12, 14, 15, 18, 21; Pretty Little Liars and the "A" Network - Who is "A"?; The Lady Killer Episode - Alternate endings; Bonus Webisodes - More Rosewood's secrets revealed!; Gag Reel
United States	United Kingdom	Australia	Deleted scenes: Episodes: 2, 6, 8, 9, 10, 11, 12, 14, 15, 18, 21; Pretty Little Liars and the "A" Network - Who is "A"?; The Lady Killer Episode - Alternate endings; Bonus Webisodes - More Rosewood's secrets revealed!; Gag Reel
June 4, 2013	April 21, 2014	June 19, 2013	Deleted scenes: Episodes: 2, 6, 8, 9, 10, 11, 12, 14, 15, 18, 21; Pretty Little Liars and the "A" Network - Who is "A"?; The Lady Killer Episode - Alternate endings; Bonus Webisodes - More Rosewood's secrets revealed!; Gag Reel
