= Pretty Little Liars season 2 =

Pretty Little Liars
- Season 2
- Season 2 DVD cover
- Starring: Troian Bellisario; Ashley Benson; Holly Marie Combs; Lucy Hale; Ian Harding; Bianca Lawson; Laura Leighton; Chad Lowe; Shay Mitchell; Sasha Pieterse
- No. of episodes: 25

Release
- Original network: ABC Family
- Original release: June 14, 2011 – March 19, 2012

Season chronology
- ← Previous; Season 1 Next → Season 3

The second season of Pretty Little Liars, based on the books of the same name by Sara Shepard, premiered on June 14, 2011, and concluded on March 19, 2012, on ABC Family. On January 10, 2011, ABC Family renewed the series for a second season. The season premiere brought in 3.68 million viewers, which was higher than the season 1 premiere. The Halloween special aired on October 19, 2011, drawing 2.5 million total viewers. The second half of season 2 premiered on January 2, 2012.

The second season of Pretty Little Liars received critical praise from critics, particularly for its complex storylines, mysterious and thrilling atmosphere, characters, and the Halloween special episode. In subsequent years, it has been hailed by fans as the best season of the series. In particular, the finale received widespread acclaim, with many highlighting the satisfying 'A' reveal, the motivations of Mona Vanderwaal, and the poignant final scene surrounding Maya and Emily's relationship. Janel Parrish received universal acclaim for her performance as Mona Vanderwaal in this episode and across the entire season and won the Teen Choice Award for Choice TV Villain. Parrish was subsequently upgraded to the starring cast after this season.

== Overview ==
Picking up the night Ian Thomas's body disappears, Spencer, Aria, Hanna, and Emily are painted as liars by the news and police. The girls' parents request they see a therapist, Dr. Anne Sullivan. They initially refuse, and after a tense therapy session, their parents ask that the girls end their friendships with one another. This creates much tension, as the girls are forced to meet in secret. Spencer reveals that Ian may still be alive, suspecting Melissa to be hiding him somewhere. With the help of Melissa's ex-fiancé Wren, the girls follow them out to an old silo, where Ian's body is discovered, along with a suicide note. Emily later realizes that the note is composed of various messages from "A" and that "A" planted the note to make them think Ian had murdered Alison. Armed with this revelation, the girls begin investigating other potential suspects, such as Alison's older brother Jason, who has moved back to town, as well as Jenna Marshall. They later cut ties with Garrett Reynolds after learning of his romantic relationship with Jenna, who Ali had accidentally blinded in a prank gone wrong.

The girls confess to Dr. Sullivan that they are being tortured by "A", allowing Dr. Sullivan to piece together the blackmailer's identity. However, before Dr. Sullivan can inform the girls of who "A" is, she disappears. "A" forces the girls to do various tasks throughout Hanna's father's wedding day, such as forcing Aria to blackmail Ezra's former fiancé with a plagiarized college paper and sabotaging Hanna's father's wedding. Spencer is also forced to end her relationship with Toby Cavanaugh to keep him safe from "A's" wrath.

Emily is lured out to an old barn, where she is trapped by "A" who attempts to kill her using carbon monoxide poisoning. However, someone rescues her, and Emily has a vision of Alison. The girls arrive and "A" instructs them to dig up Dr. Sullivan before she runs out of oxygen. However, "A" has framed them, and they are subsequently arrested with the shovel Alison had been murdered with. Spencer's mother is able to get them out of jail and they are forced to endure community service.

Aria also reveals her relationship with Ezra to her parents before "A" can, which ends negatively. Aria's father makes numerous threats towards him, before causing him to lose his job at Hollis College. Although they break up briefly, Aria and Ezra begin seeing each other in secret with the help of her childhood friend, Holden Strauss. Unbeknownst to his overprotective parents, Holden participates in regular fighting competitions, despite having a severe heart condition.

The girls later attempt to trick "A" by making them think they have something that could give away their identity; Emily is confronted by "A" in an abandoned plant nursery. When Emily reveals the girls had tricked them, "A" physically attacks her, but Aria and Spencer arrive and corner them. They throw a vase into the air, shattering the glass ceiling and allowing them enough time to escape; however, Hanna arrives and hits "A" with her car, knocking them down momentarily. The girls chase them into the woods, but lose them. When they examine Hanna's car, they discover "A's" phone on the ground, which had apparently fallen out of their pocket when Hanna hit them with her car. The girls enlist Caleb's help in unlocking the phone, as Hanna and Caleb had gotten back together during the later half of the season.

Eventually, Alison is linked to an old doll hospital in town nearby called Brookhaven, and later a rural motel, The Lost Woods Resort. The girls attend a masquerade party, where they plan to confront "A" who appears to be a woman dressed as The Black Swan from Swan Lake. Spencer, accompanied by Mona, rides out to Lost Woods, while the other girls chase "A". Spencer and Mona are able to steal the key to one of the rooms, which is revealed to be "A's" Lair. Mona then reveals to Spencer that she is "A", while the woman at the costume party was only a decoy. Mona knocks Spencer unconscious, driving her to a nearby cliff. She gives Spencer the option of joining her "A" Team, or dying.

Spencer momentarily escapes, and the other girls learn of Mona's plan and rush to her aid. Spencer and Mona struggle, and Mona is knocked into a ravine, but survives. Emily learns that Maya was murdered, after she had seemingly disappeared. Mona is hospitalized in Radley Sanitarium, where she is visited by a blonde woman in a red trench coat, revealing Mona was working for someone else the whole time.

== Cast ==
=== Main cast ===
- Troian Bellisario as Spencer Hastings
- Ashley Benson as Hanna Marin
- Holly Marie Combs as Ella Montgomery
- Lucy Hale as Aria Montgomery
- Ian Harding as Ezra Fitz
- Bianca Lawson as Maya St. Germain^{[A]}
- Laura Leighton as Ashley Marin
- Chad Lowe as Byron Montgomery
- Shay Mitchell as Emily Fields
- Sasha Pieterse as Alison DiLaurentis

=== Recurring cast ===
- Tyler Blackburn as Caleb Rivers
- Janel Parrish as Mona Vanderwaal
- Keegan Allen as Toby Cavanaugh
- Yani Gellman as Garrett Reynolds
- Tammin Sursok as Jenna Marshall
- Drew Van Acker as Jason DiLaurentis
- Torrey DeVitto as Melissa Hastings
- Brendan Robinson as Lucas Gottesman
- Cody Allen Christian as Mike Montgomery
- Nolan North as Peter Hastings
- Roark Critchlow as Tom Marin
- Brant Daugherty as Noel Kahn
- Nia Peeples as Pam Fields
- Julian Morris as Wren Kingston
- Lesley Fera as Veronica Hastings
- Annabeth Gish as Anne Sullivan
- Shane Coffey as Holden Strauss
- Bryce Johnson as Darren Wilden
- Paloma Guzmán as Jackie Molina
- Natalie Hall as Kate Randall

=== Guest cast ===
- Ryan Merriman as Ian Thomas
- Claire Holt as Samara Cook
- Heather Mazur as Isabel Randall Marin
- Jim Titus as Officer Barry Maple
- Eric Steinberg as Wayne Fields
- Lindsey Shaw as Paige McCullers
- Lachlan Buchanan as Duncan Albert
- Amanda Schull as Meredith Sorenson
- Andrea Parker as Jessica DiLaurentis
- Betty Buckley as Regina Marin
- Tilky Jones as Logan Reed
- Anthony Tyler Quinn as Ron
- Giant Drag as Themselves

Notes

- ^{^[a]} Cast member Bianca Lawson is credited as a series regular from episode 11 until episode 20. Unlike the other series regulars, Lawson is only credited in the episodes she appears in.

== Episodes ==
No. overall	No. in season	Title	Directed by	Written by	Original release date	U.S. viewers (millions)
23	1	"It's Alive"	Ron Lagomarsino	I. Marlene King	June 14, 2011	3.68
The girls' parents have gathered for an intervention to send the girls to group therapy. Aria finally considers reconciling and visits Ezra's apartment, their relationship worsens when Ezra admits that he was still in love with his ex, Jackie, when he and Aria first met. Lucas brings Caleb back to Rosewood for Hanna but she's too hurt to take him back. Caleb explains that he wrote her a letter and gave it to Mona, who threw it away. Hanna confronts Mona about the letter, but leaves when she realizes to her shock that Noel Kahn and Mona are dating. Emily is struggling to deal with her impending move to Texas and losing her friends, including Toby, who she re-bonds with as they wait for Spencer to join them in secret. Spencer then cancels as she is having some difficulties with family at home: Melissa, distraught over her missing husband, Ian, threatens not to let Spencer anywhere near the baby. She decides to make up with Spencer, however, even telling her the unborn baby's name, Taylor. The girls resolve to spill at least some of their secrets to Dr. Sullivan. The girls then notice that Ezra's diploma, the missing piece from his apartment, is sitting on a shelf in the doctor's office. The girls freak out and leave before they can tell Dr. Sullivan their secrets. Dr. Sullivan later contacts the girls' parents and recommends that they take some time apart due to their "unstable" behavior during their last therapy session. After Spencer finds a text message on Melissa's phone, she suspects that the caller is Ian. 'A' ending: 'A' is in Emily's room, deleting files of A's messages and the copy of the video.
24	2	"The Goodbye Look"	Norman Buckley	Joseph Dougherty	June 21, 2011	2.66
The Liars find that Jason Dilaurentis has moved back into Rosewood, with a very suspicious attitude. Samara and Emily start to hang out, but Emily struggles with her family's impending move to Texas. However, when a college athletic scout approaches her after a swim meet, she sees an opportunity that could keep her in Rosewood. She tries to convince her parents that the athletic scout "basically offered" her a scholarship to college, but she has to have a record of continuity. When she asks for a formal letter of this offer, the scout tells her there's no guarantee she'll get it. Pam tells Emily that someone has been breaking into everyone's houses stealing camping supplies. Hanna's father returns to town, but Hanna doesn't trust him after seeing him marry into a new family. Mona tries to get Hanna's forgiveness by talking to Aria for advice;— but Aria tells her that she's not allowed to talk to Hanna, so Mona's on her own. Mona also asks Aria to pick a goodbye present for Ezra's last day, since she knows him better "from the play." Spencer thinks that her sister is hiding something to protect Ian. She also discovers that Toby, much to her dismay, has a new job with the Rosewood construction company;— so that he can be free of his parents with the money he earns;— only to be let go on his first day due to a conflict with the clients over Toby's reputation. Spencer tries to find out what Jason is up to, only to be interrogated by Jason about Ian's apparent death. The Liars discuss the fact that the only evidence they had has been deleted. 'A' ending: 'A' pets the puppy at the front yard.
25	3	"My Name Is Trouble"	Elodie Keene	Oliver Goldstick	June 28, 2011	2.78
Spencer dreams that "A" is about to attack all the girls as they are hanging out together in a movie theater. Melissa rudely awakens Spencer as she searched for her lost wedding ring. Spencer then begins to suspect that Melissa has been talking to Ian since she leaves the room to take calls and lies about leaving the house. Hanna's dad is staying in Rosewood, and Hanna is confused to how she feels and why her mother is not reacting in romantic manners to Tom's appearance. Emily creates a fake letter saying she will be accepted into Danby University if she continues to swim anchor for Rosewood Swim Team. Aria takes a pottery class at Hollis but she runs into Jenna. Toby begins to work for Jason DiLaurentis, in order to save up for a truck so he can begin his job in Yardley and finally get away from his parents and step-sister. Spencer suspects that Jason is housing Ian because of the shadows in the upstairs windows and the bloody gauze in the garbage. 'A' ending: 'A' buys Melissa's ring in the pawn shop.
26	4	"Blind Dates"	Dean White	Charlie Craig	July 5, 2011	2.42
To celebrate Emily's "acceptance" to Danby University, Pam invites Samara over for dinner. Samara is able to convince Pam that Danby won’t be the only school interested in offering Emily a scholarship, giving Emily time to figure out what to do next. Lucas worries about his upcoming date with Danielle, so he asks Hanna to double with him and tells her to bring Caleb. Unfortunately, Danielle thinks that Hanna is interested in Lucas. To convince Danielle that there is nothing between her and Lucas, Hanna and Caleb pretend to be on a real date. Hanna goes to the therapist alone for the first time, but isn’t willing to open up to her. However, after Lucas thanks her for helping him with Danielle, Hanna realizes that she can’t allow Ali to control her life anymore. She goes to see Dr. Sullivan again and confronts her past. Meanwhile, Aria learns that Mike has been lying about playing basketball after school every day. Spencer goes to Wren to ask him for help in tracking down Ian, but he refuses. She is finally able to convince him to trick Melissa into bringing him to Ian, so Spencer can follow them there. When Wren gets the word, the Liars follow Melissa in a car to a cabin in the woods, a few seconds later Melissa screams, and when they enter the cabin, they see Ian's dead body sitting up against the wall, along with a gun and a suicide note, in which he has confessed to Alison's murder. 'A' ending: 'A' puts Ian's phone in Spencer's backpack.
27	5	"The Devil You Know"	Michael Grossman	Maya Goldsmith	July 12, 2011	2.42
Emily, Aria, Hanna, and Spencer learn that Ian's suicide note wasn't real; it was just made up of "A" text messages. Aria's brother Mike is caught trying to break into Jason DiLaurentis' house and is also the one that stole things from Emily's garage and pushed Aria in Spencer's house. Melissa tells Spencer that her baby is a girl and while talking to Melissa, Ian's phone goes off in Spencer's bag making it look like Spencer was pretending to be Ian by texting Melissa. Hanna meets Caleb's foster mom, Janet, and says that if she doesn't continue giving Caleb his money until he is 18, then Hanna is going to bring Janet to court. While Emily is at a delivery store, she comes across Logan Reed, Logan then tells Emily that he never met Ian and that a woman on the phone hired him. At Ian's funeral, Aria talks to Jason who tells her he thought he could have possibly killed Alison while he was drunk the night of her death and his suspicions were raised when he woke up the next morning with a note that read, "I know what you did." Emily's clues from A's texts lead the girls to Alison's grave where A plays the video via projector of Ian presumably killing Alison with the added part of Ali shown to be unharmed revealing she was still alive. 'A' ending: 'A' walks by the girls with the projector in the hand.
28	6	"Never Letting Go"	J. Miller Tobin	Bryan M. Holdman	July 19, 2011	2.53
Spencer hears her dad on the phone with someone, yelling and specifically complaining that Jason is home. Spencer tries to strike up a conversation with her father, as he searches for an unhealthy night-time snack. The Liars meet with Jessica DiLaurentis for lunch shortly afterwards, despite their awkward reservations. She then presents the girls with presents; four high fashion dresses and asks the girls to model them in the fashion show. Just before the show, Spencer hands Noel the disc Mona asked her to deliver to him. In the corner of the room, Jessica and Peter have an argument. The fashion shows starts, and later the tribute to Alison begins, with her image prominent on the runway screen and the girls walking the runway in her dresses. Suddenly, the image changes so as to make Alison look like the devil, with fire around and peeling black eyes. The screen flashes "the bitch is dead," and the music changes from sentimental to hellish. Spencer runs to Noel to make him turn it off, but he claims he can't. She unplugs all the wires around his equipment until the images and sound effects stop. 'A' ending: 'A' buys a pair of black women boots online.
29	7	"Surface Tension"	Norman Buckley	Joseph Dougherty	July 26, 2011	2.36
Aria's parents throw a dinner party, putting Aria face-to-face with both Ezra and Jason. The awkward night is interrupted when Mike gets arrested for breaking into another house. Emily tries to get used to living with the Marins, while Hanna tries to come to terms with Caleb's "sketchy" business. While doing landscaping work for the Hastings, Toby finds an old hockey stick buried in the backyard, and Spencer's father becomes visibly nervous but burns it in the fire saying it doesn't mean anything. Toby later tells Spencer about it, and she thinks it might be the weapon used to kill Ali. Ashley and Ella begin to wonder if there isn't something more serious going on in the girls' lives that they don't know. After searching through Mike's bag of stolen items, Aria realizes that Officer Garrett cannot be trusted, just as Spencer sits in the car telling Garrett she doesn't know if she believes that Ian killed Ali anymore. 'A' ending: 'A' injects steroids into Emily's lotion.
30	8	"Save the Date"	Chris Grismer	Matt Witten	August 2, 2011	2.41
Emily has been juggling a lot of secrets and lies lately, and with a surprise visit from her father before a big swim meet, the pressure gets to be too much for her — sending her to the hospital with an ulcer. But with the prospect of having to come clean to her father about Danby, Emily realizes she has bigger problems when "A" reveals his/her part in Emily's swim career. Wren turns out to be her doctor in the hospital. While visiting Emily, Spencer and Aria take the opportunity to try and do more digging around about the cause of Alison's death and how the broken field hockey stick may play a part in the last few moments of their friend's life. Spencer discovers that Ali had been buried alive because Ali's autopsy report mentions her having dirt in her lungs. She also discovers that Ali's report is missing a page. Meanwhile, Hanna struggles with the prospect of losing both men in her life when her father's wedding "Save the Date" arrives, and the possibility of Caleb running out of Rosewood before his past can come back to haunt him. 'A' ending: In the morgue, after the janitor passes by, 'A' rises under the sheets, revealing to be in the room at the same time as the Liars.
31	9	"Picture This"	Patrick Norris	Jonell Lennon	August 9, 2011	2.54
Spencer begins to suspect Jason after finding his broken hockey stick in her yard, and deciding that he was the one who stole the missing page in Alison's autopsy file. While spying on him in his front yard and seeing how protective he is over the shed in his yard, she and Emily decide to break in. While in the shed, they find pictures of Aria while she is sleeping, and a box of cameras and spying equipment. This leads the girls to realizing that Jason is spying on Aria, and could be spying on all of them. Meanwhile, A put steroids in Emily's pain cream which caused her blood tests to show signs of human growth hormones. Hanna's mom allows Emily to have Samara and some of Samara's friends over for a small get together, and A forces Emily to give her phone number to one of Samara's friends, Zoey. Samara's other friend catches Emily giving Zoey her number and then later tells Samara, which ends Emily's relationship with her. Aria begins to have continuous dreams about Jason, which she feels is threatening her relationship with Ezra. Later at the park, Jason kisses Aria, but she tells him she is already taken, leading Jason to think she's afraid of him. Hanna discovers that the man following Caleb is not a policeman, but instead a private investigator hired by his birth mother to find him. Caleb receives her phone number and is not sure whether to call her but Hanna convinces him that he should. Caleb leaves Rosewood and go to California to see her. Spencer and Emily return to Jason's shed, only to find that he has discovered someone was in it and he has removed everything. 'A' ending: 'A' develops a photograph of Spencer and Emily entering Jason's shed in Jason's darkroom.
32	10	"Touched by an A-ngel"	Chad Lowe	Charlie Craig & Maya Goldsmith	August 16, 2011	2.30
Aria finds herself in a difficult position when trying to process Spencer and Emily's news about Jason. Aria reveals to Emily and Spencer that Jason kissed her, but she rejected him, and in turn, Emily and Spencer reveal that Jason has been taking pictures of her while she was sleeping; as well as having a darkroom in his shed. Aria talks to Jason about what her friends told her about him. He tells Aria that Ali was the one who took the pictures of Aria, and he had found the pictures in a box underneath Ali's floorboards in her room when he was renovating it. Spencer reveals to Ezra that she knows about his and Aria's relationship, and Aria's mother suspects that Spencer and Ezra are hooking up when she sees them conversing in his car. Ella tells Aria that she thinks Spencer and Ezra have something going on; Aria finds out that she would feel betrayed if Aria told her about her relationship with Ezra; Ella decides to send Mike to a therapist. Mona pushes Hanna to try to play nice with her future step-sister, Kate, at her bridesmaids fitting, which ends up with the two riding horses at an equestrian club. Meanwhile, Spencer and Toby find Ian's old yearbook while packing up his belongings and they find out that Jason, Ian, and Garrett were all in the "NAT Club". Jenna pays a visit to Spencer's house and demands she stop digging for information. 'A' ending: 'A' is seen talking to the girls' therapist, Dr. Anne Sullivan.
33	11	"I Must Confess"	Norman Buckley	Oliver Goldstick	August 23, 2011	2.63
After being pushed around, threatened and more by "A," Emily is at a breaking point and her friends know that something drastic has to be done to save her. The girls turn to the only person they have come to trust and know that she can’t let their secrets out;– Dr. Sullivan. Finally being able to reveal the torment that "A" has put them through to someone outside of the tight-knit group gives the girls a sense of relief and Emily a new sense of courage. Hanna's grandmother arrives in town for Tom's rehearsal dinner, making sure to let it be known that she doesn't want the wedding to happen. Kate seeks her revenge on Hanna for what she said at the ranch. Byron and Ella continue to argue about how to help Mike, while Mike finally manages to open up to Aria. Spencer's father tells her that he committed a crime to help the DiLaurentis family and that Jason had motive to kill Alison, and he inadvertently tells her that the DiLaurentis family has some dirt against them. Emily, still feeling more courageous because of her talk with Dr. Sullivan, calls Maya and they meet for dinner. During that dinner, Dr. Sullivan studies her files and soon figures out who "A" is. 'A' ending: 'A' removes the files and the bug from Dr. Sullivan's office.
34	12	"Over My Dead Body"	Ron Lagomarsino	I. Marlene King	August 30, 2011	2.98
"A" has given each of the four girls a task to save Dr. Sullivan. They each receive wind-up dolls that speak out their missions. Aria's task is to get rid of Jackie with proof of Jackie's plagiarism. Spencer must break up with Toby in order to keep him safe from "A". Hanna must stop her father's wedding by telling Isabel about her parents' affair. Emily has to follow A's directions, and winds up getting trapped in a barn with a car engine running. Emily passes out and is later saved from the death of carbon monoxide poisoning by "A" and dragged out of the barn. Emily has a conversation with Alison in a dream. Emily then wakes up to find the other three girls beside her. Emily notices a shovel that hadn't been present when she arrived at the barn. A message on the shovel reveals the coordinates of Dr. Sullivan's location in the forest. The four assume that Dr. Sullivan was buried alive, but when they dig up the "burial ground", they only find her boots and a dummy. They are cornered by the police and taken into custody. Garrett gives Jenna the missing page 5 of Alison's autopsy report which he plans for Jenna to burn and seemingly reveals that they planned everything. 'A' ending: 'A' meets Dr. Sullivan at a diner and gives her an envelope after Dr. Sullivan claims to have done everything 'A' has asked her to, and leaves.
35	13	"The First Secret"	Dana W. Gonzales	I. Marlene King	October 19, 2011	2.47
It's the Halloween before Alison disappeared and where all of the secrets and lies began for Aria, Emily, Hanna, and Spencer. After meeting Jenna, Alison gets an anonymous text from a blocked number. Later, Aria and Alison go out for frozen yogurt. While they are walking, Mona sees them and calls out to join them. Aria and Alison run off in attempt to lose Mona. They turn a corner and stop in when they see Byron and Meredith making out in his car. The gang goes to a Halloween party hosted by Noel. Some time later, Emily is sitting outside alone. Hanna joins her, wondering where Alison is. The other Liars join up, and they get a text that reads, "I’m in trouble, come alone" from Ali, directing them to the scary house's address. They find Ali in a locked room. Seemingly terrified, she recounts that someone grabbed her and brought her there threatening to kill her with a knife. Nobody can get a signal to dial 911 from their cell phones, so Ali goes out alone. Then she screams, but the door is now bolted. Through the keyhole they see a big fight with her and costumed guy with a knife. Ali knees him and runs off, and the Liars get out through a conveniently open window. They go back in the house, and Ali is rocking in a chair, brandishing a knife and looking completely insane, but she says it was all a hoax. Noel was the zombie, and the blood was ketchup. Back at the party, Noel then approaches Ali to apologize, but she tells him it was perfect—but then realizes he's apologizing because he didn’t make it to the plot; he was stuck at the party, not because he had been too rough with her. Giant Drag guest stars.
36	14	"Through Many Dangers, Toils and Snares"	Norman Buckley	Joseph Dougherty	January 2, 2012	3.34
It's exactly a month after "A" framed the girls for Alison's murder. Spencer rejects Toby and the gift he made her, Caleb returns to Hanna, and Ezra and Aria reveal their relationship to Aria's parents. The relationship between Aria, Emily, Hanna, and Spencer changes following their arrest. Spencer and Emily fight to trick 'A' into believing that the girls were falling apart. The girls fool "A" into believing that they know something which was hidden in Alison's box that Jason gave to Aria. Emily meets "A" and shows them an empty box, making the girls' charade known to "A". "A" attacks Emily and tries to stab her with a nearby tool, but Aria and Spencer show up and corner them before they are able to use it. "A" shatters the glass from the ceiling by throwing up a pot and makes a run for it. As "A" exits the greenhouse they were in, Hanna pulls up, and "A" is hit by her car. The girls chase after "A," but lose them and, just when Spencer declares they have nothing, they notice "A's" cell phone lying on the ground. 'A' ending: 'A' punches the car in anger and glass shatters from the window and side view mirror when realizing to have lost the cellphone.
37	15	"A Hot Piece of 'A'"	Michael Grossman	Oliver Goldstick	January 9, 2012	2.95
The girl's head back into the greenhouse to look for the box and decide what to do next. Spencer suggests calling Caleb to help them recover information from the phone. While Caleb downloads the information on the computer from the phone, the owner shuts the phone down. Caleb works on decrypting the files on his laptop at school, which concerns Hanna. Spencer approaches Emily, hoping to enlist her help in snooping around Jason's house. Emily starts community service at the crisis hotline that afternoon, Aria is on lockdown and Hanna is unhappy with Spencer for dragging Caleb into their "A" investigation. Emily suggests Spencer let Hanna use her lake house with Caleb. At Hanna's house, Hanna tries to study while Lucas seems distracted. She gets a text from Spencer offering her the lake house. She gets the brilliant idea to use it to throw Caleb a surprise birthday party and enlists Lucas' help in planning it. Emily attends her first training session at the crisis hotline center. While reading a training transcript, Emily realizes the caller seems likely to be "A's" helper. Emily shows Spencer and Aria the transcript she swiped from the crisis center. At the crisis center, Emily's supervisor tells her to listen in on the call that just came in because it is the transcript caller calling back. Spencer and Emily listen together and recognize the caller's voice as Lucas'. Spencer and Emily learn from Mona that Hanna took the rowboat out with Lucas to set up the fireworks across the lake. Halfway across the lake, Lucas stops rowing. Hanna flips, pushes him overboard, and takes the oars but later falls overboard. Emily to go inside and call the police as Hanna swims to the shore. 'A' ending: 'A' fishes up Lucas' shoes from the lake.
38	16	"Let the Water Hold Me Down"	Chris Grismer	Bryan M. Holdman	January 16, 2012	2.78
Spencer finds an old receipt in her lake house attic, and assumes that "A" had been there. The receipt shows an address in Philadelphia, which Aria and Spencer agree to visit. At school, Aria confesses to Spencer that her mom thinks she made a date with Holden when she really called Ezra. Ezra tells her that she can't call him anymore. Holden asks Aria out despite her being grounded. Aria buys tickets for a play for her and Holden's date. Hanna argues with Caleb when Caleb wants to go look for Lucas but she doesn't want to. In Philly, Spencer notices a rehab center for the blind near the address on the receipt. This was where Jenna used to go before moving back to Rosewood. Spencer goes in to ask about Jenna, and notices Garrett checked Jenna out of the rehab center the night after Ali died, and never checked back in. Spencer steals the patient logbook from which the year Jenna was there, and leaves after pretending to sign-in. Holden figures out that Aria and Ezra have a relationship, and understands this because he hides stuff from his parents too. Maya reveals to Emily that while she was at "sober camp", she hooked up with a guy, and Emily is unstirred. Hanna encounters Lucas in her house, and Lucas tells her he never wanted to hurt her. Caleb shows up and asks where Lucas was. Lucas reveals he was on the crisis hotline because he lost Caleb's money in a bet. He was missing because he drove around all night selling his comic books to get the money back, and he took Hanna out onto the lake to ask her to soften the blow of the news for Caleb. 'A' ending: 'A' is seen loosening the hinges on some unknown scaffolding.
39	17	"The Blond Leading the Blind"	Arlene Sanford	Charlie Craig	January 23, 2012	3.17
The girls check out what Caleb got from A's cell phone. They see a video from Alison's bedroom. Ian sets up a video camera, and then Garrett leads Jenna into the room. Ian and Garrett argue over getting videos from Alison and the girls realize this was the night Alison was murdered. Hanna notices a piece of paper inside the dolls from the box. It is a series of threatening notes, one of them making reference to a pumpkin. The girls flash back to Halloween coming home with Alison after Noel's party. A jack-o-lantern on her front porch had a knife stuck in its head. Toby climbs the scaffolding at the Hastings' house and falls off causing him to break his arm. Spencer tells Emily she thinks she's putting Toby in danger. She wants Emily to do something that might make him hate Spencer but there is only one thing she could think of that could save Toby. Emily sees Toby's and tells him that the guy Spencer was seeing before him is back. Emily says she's telling him because Spencer couldn't. Ezra eventually shows up to meet Aria. In his car he says what they are doing is dangerous. He wants her to be safe and happy and wants her to make sure that being together is what she wants. Caleb tells Spencer and Emily that the only way he's going to continue working is if they let him know what Hanna is so afraid of. Spencer gave Caleb a streamlined version of what has been happening, but Hanna doesn't know they have told him anything. Spencer, Emily, and Aria watch the rest of the video. Ian tells Garrett he's "going down" and pulls out the camera. Garrett and Ian fight just as Alison enters the room. 'A' ending: 'A' is seen cutting up a picture of Spencer and Toby and burning it. A does the same with Ezra and Aria's picture cutting it in half.
40	18	"A Kiss Before Lying"	Wendey Stanzler	Maya Goldsmith	January 30, 2012	2.55
Hanna thinks that the girls are icing her out because she destroyed the memory card from A's phone. Caleb agreed to continue decrypting the information from A's phone if Spencer, Aria, and Emily agrees to not tell Hanna about it. A knows that Caleb is working on decrypting the phone, so A threatens Hanna to make Caleb stop or else she’d expose her mother's secret about stealing money from the bank. Hanna decides to tell Caleb about her mother's secret, in hoping that he’d stop working on A's phone. Caleb finds a photo of a fake ID of a brunette Alison. Hanna sees this picture and tells Spencer that she saw Alison in a brunette wig, with the alias of Vivian Darkbloom. Hanna and Spencer find a claim ticket in one of Alison's books. Spencer, pretending to be Vivian, calls the number. Hanna's step-sister Kate is now in Rosewood. When Spencer meets Kate, she realizes that she knows her from a summer camp that Melissa used to work at. Spencer had a photo of Kate with a bunch of bug bites from camp, and threatened to show it to the school if Kate isn’t nice to Hanna. Meanwhile, Emily hopes that her mother's visit to Rosewood will be a good opportunity to re-introduce her to Maya and hope that things will turn out better than they did the last time. However, Maya is still upset about how Pam ratted her out, so she goes out of her way to make the dinner extremely uncomfortable for Emily and her mother. Ezra gets offered a job that would require him to move. He finds out that Aria's father had set up this job offer for him in hoping that Ezra would be out of Aria's life. 'A' ending: 'A' breaks into Peter Hastings' office and takes a gun out of his desk drawer.
41	19	"The Naked Truth"	Elodie Keene	Oliver Goldstick & Francesca Rollins	February 6, 2012	2.25
It's Truth Up Day at Rosewood High, and it seems some will have more to spill than others. Spencer, Aria, Emily and Hanna deal with their own personal problems, before A exposes everything. When they see that Kate has a birthmark right above her waist, they know that the photo that was sent to everyone else was photoshopped. Hanna realizes that A hadn't sent that photo with Hanna's phone, because there was no reason for A to help Kate. In the bathroom, Hanna pushes Kate to tell the truth, which Aria and Emily record while hiding in the stalls. They prove to the principal that Hanna is innocent. Aria is suspicious about Holden, who she thinks is "hurting himself". When Aria gets locked out on the rooftop of the school and is attacked by Noel, who is now Jenna's boyfriend, Holden rescues her by kicking Noel in the face in a very professional matter, thus revealing more about his secret. Mona and Emily become closer when Mona volunteers to find a way to get Emily back on the swim team since the principal felt Emily would tarnish the team's reputation, due to the Liars' trouble with the police. Jason comes back to Rosewood looking for Spencer's father. During the school's Truth Up Day event, Spencer overhears Jason and her mom arguing about how everyone should "know the truth." It is then revealed that Jason and Spencer share the same father. Later on, the number they found in Vivian Darkbloom's jacket returns their call and asks to meet up face-to-face to answer some questions. 'A' ending: 'A' is seen approaching a sleeping Caleb during the night and taking his laptop out of his bag.
42	20	"CTRL:A"	Ron Lagomarsino	Joseph Dougherty & Lijah J. Barasz	February 13, 2012	2.11
Garrett gives Caleb a court order to obtain his computer as says someone is hacking into the school's files and he traced it back to his IP address. In the computer lab, Caleb tells Hanna that Garrett can't get past his firewall without his help and the files from A are all on flash drives. Aria finally finds out what Holden is doing on their "dates" - he is doing martial arts but his parents forbid it as Holden has a heart condition. Spencer visits Jason where he tells her that he found another one of Ali's boxes under the floorboards at their grandma's house. There were love letters and $15,000. Later, the girls go to meet Jonah, someone with information about Alison's alter ego, Vivian. He says Vivian told him about a friend called Alison who was getting texts from somebody with a blocked number and she would pay to find out whom. Ashley and Hanna are called to the police station where they reveal a photo of Emily, Spencer, and Hanna in nurse dresses outside the morgue. Hanna tells Ashley it was a practical joke and they don't know anything about the missing page. Spencer talks with her dad about Jason and admits he cheated and got Jessica DiLaurentis pregnant. Spencer asks about the letters and money, but he says he never gave money to the DiLaurentis family. In her bedroom, Hanna is trying to hack into Caleb's computer to delete the files, but can't remember his password. Wilden and Garrett go through Caleb's files while Hanna successfully logs into Caleb's account and finds the files "A" planted and deletes them clearing Caleb's name. Spencer tells Jason Ali needed the money to find someone she was afraid of and that the girls intend to as well. 'A' ending: Emily is in the kitchen while 'A' watches her through the window.
43	21	"Breaking the Code"	Roger Kumble	Jonell Lennon	February 20, 2012	2.54
Spencer tells the girls she got the money for Jonah from a relative and her and Aria meet Jonah at the park at 6 o’clock. They give him the money and he gives them an address, but Jonah won't disclose anything else. As the girls leave, they notice Garrett watching them in his car. Aria tells the girls that "A" sent her dad a note trying to catch Ezra and Aria and now Ella wants to find out who "A" is, and admits she and Ezra are still seeing each other. Caleb sends the girls an email with another part of Ian's video. Melissa walks into Alison's room, angrily asking where Alison is. Spencer wants to talk to Melissa first before the other girls turn her in. Mona shows Hanna an incident report from when Hanna shoplifted the sunglasses, sent by "A". "A" threatened Mona to give the report and picture to the newspaper or else she'll be filling out a police report. Hanna tells Mona about "A" and Mona asks what to do about the report. Aria, Hanna, and Emily go to the address Jonah gave of a law firm but the girls leave in a hurry when an alarm is set off. The next morning, Mona reveals to Hanna she returned the jewellery she stole saving Hanna and her mom. Ezra tells Aria he has to move away and take the job or else Aria's dad will know what's making him stay. Ella goes to Ezra's apartment saying she wants to understand. Melissa says she needs to tell Spencer something that she wanted to tell her at Ian's funeral. In Hanna's bedroom, Ashley spots the letter Aria picked up from the law firm and mentions Melissa worked there as a summer intern. 'A' ending: 'A' uses Mr. Hastings' stolen gun for target practice.
44	22	"Father Knows Best"	Chad Lowe	Charlie Craig & Bryan M. Holdman	February 27, 2012	2.49
The cops tell Emily that Maya is missing, and that her parents don't know where she is. Rosewood high hosts a father daughter dance and the girls make plans for their dates. Byron and Aria's relationship is strained, Hanna's father is MIA so her mother offers to go with her, and Emily's father comes back from Texas to attend with her. After Spencer tells Melissa that she saw her get into a car with Garrett, Melissa tells her that Garrett was helping her, as he was a close friend of Ian’s. She also reveals that she sent texts to Alison telling her to back off. Emily discovers, with help from her father, that Maya bought a ticket to San Francisco, but may not have gotten on the train. After Ashley tries to figure out who could have blackmailed Hanna with the police report, the girls decide that they should lie and say that they did it to get their parents off of "A's" trail. Aria is nominated for the job, and lies to Hanna's mother about sending the shoplifting report to Hanna saying that she did it in order to get Hanna to stop shoplifting. Spencer finds her father's check book and a check stub for $15,000 in cash. She also finds a folder with pictures of Ali in it. When Spencer confronts her father, he confesses he paid $15,000 for a private investigator to find Ali. He did this to keep Melissa safe, who was harassing Alison with vicious text messages about Ian. 'A' ending: 'A' reads a newspaper with the headline showing a picture of Maya who is listed as missing.
45	23	"Eye of the Beholder"	Melanie Mayron	Joseph Dougherty	March 5, 2012	2.58
The liars are on the hunt for answers of what Alison knew before she died. The girls meet a boy named Duncan from Alison's past, he explains how he and Ali were good friends during the summer before she returned to Rosewood and went missing. He reveals he was with Ali the day she was murdered and Ali had returned home earlier than she led the girls to believe. Toby returns to Rosewood still angry at Spencer and helping Jenna again although he suffered from her in the past. After a confrontation with Hanna, he assures her he knows what he's doing. Jenna undergoes her eye surgery but the effectiveness of the surgery is still unknown for the time being. Jason gives the girls a bag of Ali's personal items which the girls don't seem to understand until Spencer notices the box was covered with highlighted newspapers from the summer Ali died and realizes there is some pattern to it all. Jenna is injured in a fire at Jason's house but is saved by Hanna. 'A' ending: 'A' places a police badge at Jason's house.
46	24	"If These Dolls Could Talk"	Ron Lagomarsino	Oliver Goldstick & Maya Goldsmith	March 12, 2012	2.47
Ezra tells Aria he's worried about the fallout from him not taking the job Byron lined up for him. Jenna takes off the bandage covering her surgically repaired eye and it seems her surgery failed. Spencer finds out that Alison and "A" had been communicating via newspaper classified ads and was set to meet up. The girls decide to go to Brookhaven where the meeting was supposed to take place. Mona gets a text from "A" that says if she doesn't break up Hanna and Caleb she'll go back to being a loser. Aria finds an application for a boarding school in Vermont that Byron has left for Ella. The girls go to the doll store in Brookhaven and they speak with a boy named Seth, who tells them that Alison was in the store a year ago looking for a voodoo doll. He warned her against it, since a man and woman with dark hair were trying to hurt her. Aria mentions the application to Ella who says she's considering it because of "A". Aria hints at hurting Byron's career by revealing his past affair with Meredith. Melissa asks about the bag she found in Spencer's room. Spencer then shows her the video of her coming into Alison's room and says she thinks the police need to see it, but Melissa threatens her. Jenna shows Toby the missing page from Alison's autopsy report, which she got from Garrett. Jenna thinks the police should have it, so they go to the station. Melissa and Garrett are in the kitchen when she assures him Spencer didn't turn in the video. Two officers come to place Garrett under arrest for Alison's murder. 'A' ending: 'A' bribes Martha with an envelope of cash and Seth, the boy who gave the girls false information about Alison, with candy.
47	25	"UnmAsked"	Lesli Linka Glatter	I. Marlene King	March 19, 2012	3.69
On the night of the annual masquerade ball, the girls finally decide to put an end to A's game. During the ball, Mona mentions to Spencer how she saw Alison spying on someone. Emily talks with her ex Paige and they decide that they're going to attempt a friendship now that she's out of the closet. Spencer realizes that "A" wasn't watching Ali; Ali was watching "A". Mona and her go back to the Lost Woods Resort, and Spencer realizes that Room One wasn't where they had to look- it was Room two. They open the door, gasping at what they see: "A"'s Lair. It is plastered with pictures of the girls, and other things such as the voodoo doll Alison received, the creepy baby doll costume, and a doll set, each one looking like the girls with Alison sitting on the top. Spencer finds numerous things that point to Mona being "A", and "A" is finally revealed to be Mona Vanderwaal. She knocks Spencer out cold, and they take a drive. Aria video calls Spencer, and the girls see who "A" is. They flee to catch up with them. Spencer jumps out of the car, and the girls arrive. Mona freaks out and tries to kill Spencer, but ends up falling off a cliff. The ambulance arrives, and so does Dr. Sullivan. She tells them "A" threatened her son, which is why she left. It is then revealed Mona is alive. Meanwhile, we get a peek at what Mona is thinking while being kept in the mental hospital: She says that this is what "they" wanted, and their plan worked out just right. This means that Mona isn't working alone. A body is found, and it is Maya's. Emily cries while the girls comfort her. 'A' ending: A person in red visits Mona in her hospital room, to which she says to them "I did everything you asked me to."

== Development and production ==
After an initial order of 24 episodes, it was announced in June that a special Halloween-themed flashback episode would air as part of ABC Family's 13 Nights of Halloween lineup, bringing the season 2 episode order to 25 episodes.

On December 13, 2011, it was announced that the identity of A would be revealed in the Spring Finale. Filming of season two wrapped on December 16, 2011.

== Casting ==
Janel Parrish, Tammin Sursok, Bianca Lawson, and Tyler Blackburn return in the second season as Mona Vanderwaal, Jenna Marshall, Maya St. Germain, and Caleb Rivers. Also returning are Yani Gellman, Torrey DeVitto, Lindsey Shaw, Claire Holt, Keegan Allen, Brant Daugherty, Brendan Robinson, and Julian Morris, who will all reprise their roles from the first season. Annabeth Gish appears as Anne Sullivan, a therapist whom the girls' parents feel can help them on their problems. Andrea Parker will play Jessica DiLaurentis, Alison's mother, who returns to Rosewood to help out with a fashion show being held in Alison's honour. Actor Drew Van Acker also joined the cast playing Jason DiLaurentis, replacing Parker Bagley.

== Ratings ==
=== Live + SD ratings ===
No. in series	No. in season	Episode	Air date	Time slot (EST)	Rating/Share (18–49)	Viewers (m)
23	1	"It's Alive"	June 14, 2011	Tuesdays; 8:00 p.m.	1.3	3.68
24	2	"The Goodbye Look"	June 21, 2011	Tuesdays; 8:00 p.m.	1.0	2.66
25	3	"My Name Is Trouble"	June 28, 2011	Tuesdays; 8:00 p.m.	1.0	2.78
26	4	"Blind Dates"	July 5, 2011	Tuesdays; 8:00 p.m.	0.9	2.42
27	5	"The Devil You Know"	July 12, 2011	Tuesdays; 8:00 p.m.	0.9	2.42
28	6	"Never Letting Go"	July 19, 2011	Tuesdays; 8:00 p.m.	0.9	2.53
29	7	"Surface Tension"	July 26, 2011	Tuesdays; 8:00 p.m.	0.9	2.36
30	8	"Save the Date"	August 2, 2011	Tuesdays; 8:00 p.m.	0.8	2.41
31	9	"Picture This"	August 9, 2011	Tuesdays; 8:00 p.m.	0.9	2.54
32	10	"Touched by an A-ngel"	August 16, 2011	Tuesdays; 8:00 p.m.	0.8	2.30
33	11	"I Must Confess"	August 23, 2011	Tuesdays; 8:00 p.m.	1.0	2.63
34	12	"Over My Dead Body"	August 30, 2011	Tuesdays; 8:00 p.m.	1.2	2.98
35	13	"The First Secret"	October 19, 2011	Wednesday 8:00 p.m.	1.0	2.47
36	14	"Through Many Dangers, Toils and Snares"	January 2, 2012	Mondays; 8:00 p.m.	1.3	3.34
37	15	"A Hot Piece of 'A'"	January 9, 2012	Mondays; 8:00 p.m.	1.3	2.95
38	16	"Let the Water Hold Me Down"	January 16, 2012	Mondays; 8:00 p.m.	1.1	2.78
39	17	"Blond Leading the Blind"	January 23, 2012	Mondays; 8:00 p.m.	1.4	3.17
40	18	"A Kiss Before Lying"	January 30, 2012	Mondays; 8:00 p.m.	0.9	2.55
41	19	"The Naked Truth"	February 6, 2012	Mondays; 8:00 p.m.	1.0	2.25
42	20	"CTRL:A"	February 6, 2012	Mondays; 8:00 p.m.	0.8	2.11
43	21	"Breaking the Code"	February 13, 2012	Mondays; 8:00 p.m.	1.0	2.54
44	22	"Father Knows Best"	February 20, 2012	Mondays; 8:00 p.m.	1.0	2.49
45	23	"Eye of the Beholder"	March 5, 2012	Mondays; 8:00 p.m.	1.0	2.58
46	24	"If These Dolls Could Talk"	March 12, 2012	Mondays; 8:00 p.m.	1.0	2.47
47	25	"Unmasked"	March 19, 2012	Mondays; 8:00 p.m.	1.6	3.69

== DVD release ==
The Complete Second Season
Set details			Special features
25 episodes; 1095 minutes (Region 1); 1070 minutes (Region 2); 1050 minutes (Region 4); 6-disc set; 1.85:1 aspect ratio; Languages: English (Dolby Digital 2.0 Surround); Subtitles: English, and French (Region 1); English, Spanish, Danish, French, Arabic, Dutch, Norwegian, Swedish, Finnish, English for the Hearing Impaired (Regions 2 and 4)			Deleted scenes: Episodes: 1, 6, 10, 11, 12, 15, 18, 21, 24; Fashion's Guilty Pleasure - Check out the girls rocking fashion from the second season!; Men of Mystery - Go behind the scenes and get an insight on the male characters of Pretty Little Liars
Release dates			Deleted scenes: Episodes: 1, 6, 10, 11, 12, 15, 18, 21, 24; Fashion's Guilty Pleasure - Check out the girls rocking fashion from the second season!; Men of Mystery - Go behind the scenes and get an insight on the male characters of Pretty Little Liars
United States	United Kingdom	Australia	Deleted scenes: Episodes: 1, 6, 10, 11, 12, 15, 18, 21, 24; Fashion's Guilty Pleasure - Check out the girls rocking fashion from the second season!; Men of Mystery - Go behind the scenes and get an insight on the male characters of Pretty Little Liars
June 5, 2012	November 9, 2013	October 3, 2012	Deleted scenes: Episodes: 1, 6, 10, 11, 12, 15, 18, 21, 24; Fashion's Guilty Pleasure - Check out the girls rocking fashion from the second season!; Men of Mystery - Go behind the scenes and get an insight on the male characters of Pretty Little Liars
