= Pretty Little Liars =

American mystery drama television series (2010–2017)

- Genre: Teen drama; Mystery; Thriller
- Based on: Pretty Little Liars by Sara Shepard
- Developed by: I. Marlene King
- Showrunner: I. Marlene King
- Starring: Troian Bellisario; Ashley Benson; Holly Marie Combs; Lucy Hale; Ian Harding; Bianca Lawson; Laura Leighton; Chad Lowe; Shay Mitchell; Nia Peeples; Sasha Pieterse; Tyler Blackburn; Janel Parrish; Andrea Parker
- Opening theme: "Secret" by the Pierces
- Composer: Michael Suby
- Country of origin: United States
- Original language: English
- No. of seasons: 7
- No. of episodes: 160 (list of episodes)

Production
- Executive producers: I. Marlene King; Lisa Cochran-Neilan; Maya Goldsmith; Leslie Morgenstein; Joseph Dougherty; Oliver Goldstick; Bryan M. Holdman; Charles Craig; Bob Levy
- Producers: Lisa Cochran-Neilan; Maya Goldsmith; Joshua Bank; Hynndie Wali; Bryan M. Holdman; Jonell Lennon
- Production locations: Vancouver (Note: Solely the series' pilot was filmed in Vancouver.); Los Angeles
- Cinematography: Larry Reibman; Dana Gonzales; Buzz Feitshans IV; Craig Fikse; Robert LaBonge; Geoffrey Haley
- Editors: Robert Lattanzio; Lois Blumenthal; Melissa Gearhart; Susanne Malles; Jill D'Agnenica; Michael S. Murphy; Kaja Fehr; Jacqueline Cambas
- Camera setup: Single-camera
- Running time: 40–45 minutes; 89 minutes ("Till Death Do Us Part")
- Production companies: Warner Horizon Television; Alloy Entertainment; Long Lake Productions (seasons 3–7); Russian Hill Productions (seasons 3–7)

Original release
- Network: Freeform (Note: The network was named ABC Family until January 12, 2016.)
- Release: June 8, 2010 – June 27, 2017

Related
- Pretty Dirty Secrets; Ravenswood; Pretty Little Liars: The Perfectionists; Pretty Little Liars

Pretty Little Liars is an American teen drama mystery television series created by I. Marlene King. It aired on Freeform from June 8, 2010, to June 27, 2017, based on the novel series of the same name written by Sara Shepard, lasting 160 episodes over seven seasons. Set in the fictional Rosewood, Pennsylvania, the plot follows five best friends whose secrets are consistently threatened by the anonymous "A", who begins harassing them after the disappearance of their clique leader. Troian Bellisario, Ashley Benson, Lucy Hale, Shay Mitchell, Sasha Pieterse, and Janel Parrish lead the ensemble cast, alongside Holly Marie Combs, Ian Harding, Bianca Lawson, Laura Leighton, Chad Lowe, Nia Peeples, Tyler Blackburn, and Andrea Parker.

After an initial order of 10 episodes, ABC Family ordered an additional 12 episodes on June 28, 2010. The ratings success of the first 10 episodes prompted the book series to be extended beyond the initial eight novels. The series premiered to mixed reviews from critics, but garnered positive reception from critics during subsequent seasons, with the acting and tone garnering particular praise, while the series' plot holes were scrutinized. It was a worldwide viewership success, garnering a large fandom. The series finale was viewed by an estimated 1.41 million viewers. It had the second-highest rating of any cable television series that aired that night but received a lukewarm reception from both critics and audiences.

It is the first series in the Pretty Little Liars franchise, with three spin-offs. The first two, Ravenswood and Pretty Little Liars: The Perfectionists, were both cancelled after one season. An eponymous spinoff premiered on HBO Max in 2022, which focused on a new cast of characters in a different setting, and was cancelled in September 2024 after two seasons.

== Premise ==
Aria Montgomery, Emily Fields, Hanna Marin and Spencer Hastings are four former best friends who reunite one year after the disappearance of their clique leader, Alison DiLaurentis, and begin receiving threatening messages from a mysterious person who identifies themself as "A" and is aware of the mistakes, lies and secrets they have collected before and after their clique fell apart. Throughout the series, several elements from the night Alison disappeared are revealed, which help the protagonists understand what happened to their friend and how "A" appeared. Moving forward, after the original "A" is revealed, the identity is taken over by other antagonists, prompting new storylines and challenges.

== Episodes ==
Season	Episodes	Originally released		Viewers (in millions)	Adults (18-49)
Season	Episodes	First released	Last released	Viewers (in millions)	Adults (18-49)
1	22	June 8, 2010	March 21, 2011	2.87	1.0
2	25	June 14, 2011	March 19, 2012	2.68	1.0
3	24	June 5, 2012	March 19, 2013	2.59	1.1
4	24	June 11, 2013	March 18, 2014	2.53	1.1
5	25	June 10, 2014	March 24, 2015	2.01	0.9
6	20	June 2, 2015	March 15, 2016	1.72	0.8
7	20	June 21, 2016	June 27, 2017	1.10	0.6

== Cast and characters ==
- Troian Bellisario as Spencer Hastings: the brains of the group who comes from a wealthy lawyer family.
- Ashley Benson as Hanna Marin: the new it girl after Alison goes missing, and the fashionista of the group.
- Holly Marie Combs as Ella Montgomery (seasons 1–3; recurring, seasons 4–6; guest, season 7): Aria's mother and later teacher at Rosewood High.
- Lucy Hale as Aria Montgomery: the alternative member of the group and an aspiring writer.
- Ian Harding as Ezra Fitz: the English teacher at Rosewood High and Aria's love interest.
- Bianca Lawson as Maya St. Germain (seasons 1–2; recurring, season 3): Emily's love interest who struggles with substance abuse.
- Laura Leighton as Ashley Marin: Hanna's divorced mother who struggles to support herself and her daughter financially.
- Chad Lowe as Byron Montgomery (seasons 1–3; recurring, seasons 4 and 6; guest, seasons 5 and 7): Aria's father who is an English university lecturer.
- Shay Mitchell as Emily Fields: the heart of the group who comes out as gay in season one. She is a competitive swimmer in school and later becomes a coach.
- Nia Peeples as Pam Fields (season 1; recurring, seasons 2–4 and 6; guest, seasons 5 and 7): Emily's mother who initially struggles to accept her daughter, but later comes around and develops a close relationship with her.
- Sasha Pieterse as Alison DiLaurentis: the main mystery of the show who goes missing a year before the series begins. She is known for her bullying and manipulative tendencies.
- Tyler Blackburn as Caleb Rivers (seasons 3–7; recurring, seasons 1–2): Hanna's, and briefly Spencer's, love interest, and later Hanna's husband, who is adept at computer science and cyber hacking.
- Janel Parrish as Mona Vanderwaal (seasons 3–7; recurring, seasons 1–2): Hanna's best friend who used to be bullied by Alison before her disappearance. She is very smart and cunning.
- Andrea Parker as Mary Drake: Alison's aunt (season 7; guest, seasons 4 and 6), and Jessica DiLaurentis: Alison's mother (guest, season 2; recurring, seasons 4–7). They are identical twins, though Mary's identity is not revealed until season 6.

== Production ==
=== Development ===
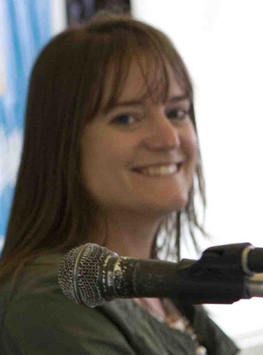
Sara Shepard (pictured in 2010) was chosen by Alloy Entertainment to write the Pretty Little Liars novel series.

The Pretty Little Liars series of novels was first published in October 2006 and comprises 18 books, divided into four arcs and companion stories. The project was given to author Sara Shepard by book packaging company Alloy Entertainment following the conception of the idea of a "Desperate Housewives for teens". Shepard was chosen due to her having grown up in a town similar to the fictional Rosewood, where the series take place, and her online presence. The television adaptation was first planned for The WB until the network shut down in 2006. A pilot for ABC Family was announced in June 2008, with I. Marlene King serving as the series' developer and showrunner. The viewership success of the first 10 episodes prompted ABC Family to order 12 additional episodes, finishing the first season with 22 installments. It also led Alloy Entertainment to extend the novel series beyond its original foreseen count of eight books.

A second season was unveiled by ABC Family on January 10, 2011. In June, the network announced that its 13 Nights of Halloween lineup would include a Halloween-themed Pretty Little Liars flashback episode, bringing the second-season episode count from 24 to 25. In December of that year, it was announced that the identity of "A" would be revealed in the second season's finale, which took place on March 19, 2012. The series' third season was confirmed in November 2011 and broadcast between June 5, 2012, and March 19, 2013, consisting of 24 episodes.

The series was renewed for a fourth season in October 2012. It was broadcast between June 11, 2013, and March 18, 2014. The fifth season was commissioned in March 2013, alongside the announcement of the spin-off series Ravenswood, and consisted of 25 episodes, including a Christmas-themed one. The special episode aired as part of the network's 25 Days of Christmas annual event. The season also included the series' 100th episode, which was celebrated by cast and crew in a private party on June 2, 2015. Before the season premiered, ABC Family renewed the series for two additional seasons of 20 episodes each, making it the network's longest running original series.

The sixth season was broadcast between June 2, 2015, and March 15, 2016. It did not include a holiday-themed episode and introduced a new opening sequence for the series. The seventh and final season was broadcast between June 21, 2016, and June 27, 2017. It marked the return of Charlie Craig, who worked on the second season, as executive producer and co-showrunner. The series' ending was confirmed by I. Marlene King and the main cast in August 2016, with the series finale being a two-hour event followed by a tell-all special with cast and crew.

=== Casting ===
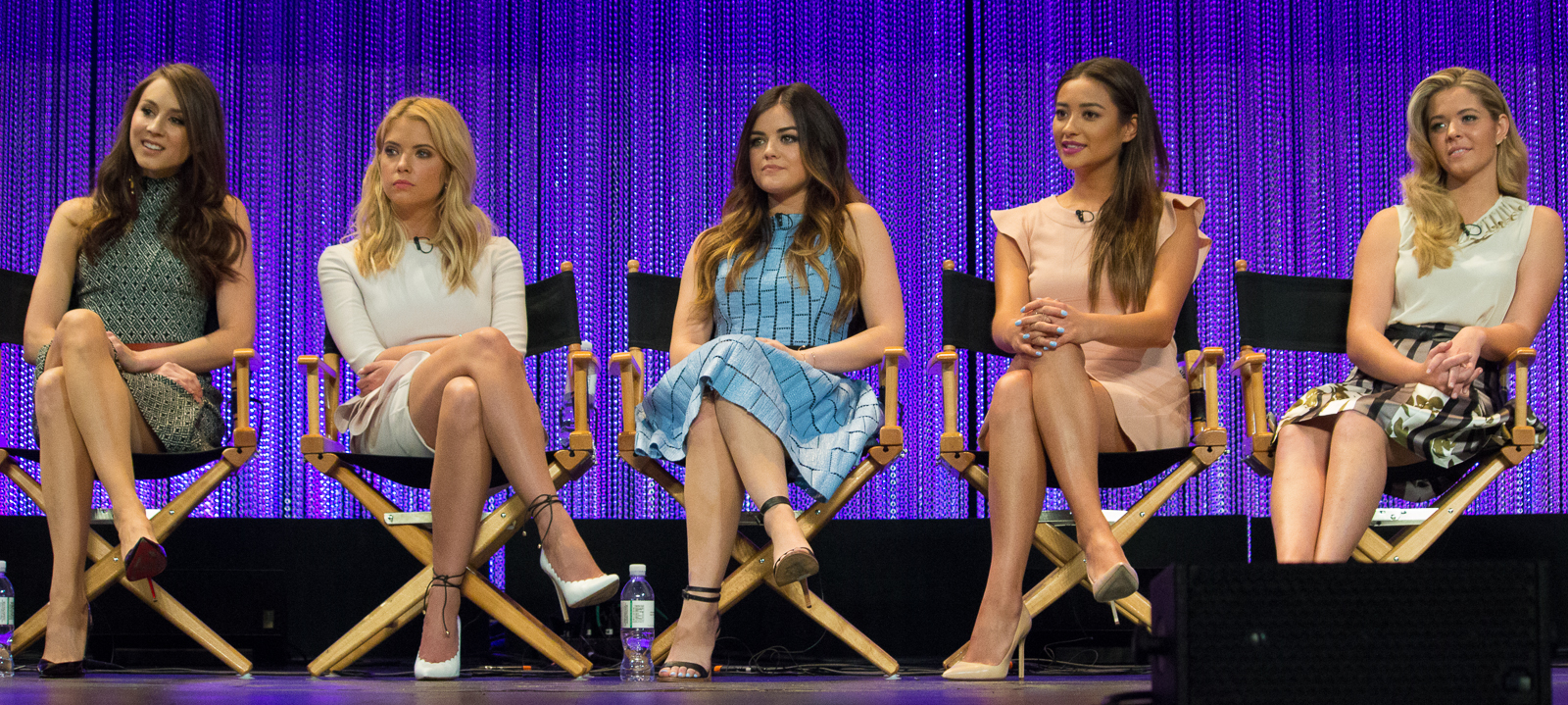
From left to right, Troian Bellisario, Ashley Benson, Lucy Hale, Shay Mitchell, and Sasha Pieterse, the protagonists of Pretty Little Liars

Casting for Pretty Little Liars began in October 2009, with Gayle Pillsbury and Bonnie Zane as casting directors. In November, Lucy Hale, Troian Bellisario and Ian Harding were respectively cast as Aria Montgomery, Spencer Hastings and Ezra Fitz, respectively. The following month, the cast added Ashley Benson as Hanna Marin, Shay Mitchell as Emily Fields, Laura Leighton as Ashley Marin, Nia Peeples as Pam Fields, Roark Critchlow as Tom Marin, Bianca Lawson as Maya, Alexis Denisof as Byron Montgomery and Jean Louisa Kelly as a mother, with Torrey DeVitto and Sasha Pieterse in undisclosed recurring roles. Mitchell originally auditioned for the role of Spencer, but was suggested by the production crew to try Emily out, to whom she felt more connected. Louisa Kelly's appearance in the series did not materialize. In January 2010, Alloy Entertainment's website confirmed that Pieterse would portray Alison DiLaurentis and DeVitto would portray Melissa Hastings, and announced the casting of Janel Parrish as Mona Vanderwaal and Igor Hudacek as Mike Montgomery; Cody Christian later replaced Hudacek. In April, Chad Lowe replaced Denisof in the role of Byron, while Holly Marie Combs joined the cast as Aria's mother, Ella.

Two actors were replaced following the pilot episode: Keegan Allen replaced James Neate as Toby Cavanaugh and Ryan Merriman replaced Carlo Marks as Ian Thomas. After the first season was broadcast, three other roles received new actors: Andrea Parker took over Jessica DiLaurentis from Anne Marie DeLuise, Drew Van Acker took over Jason DiLaurentis from Parker Bagley, and Natalie Hall took over Kate Randall from Natalie Floyd. Parker's casting for the second season was announced in April 2011. That month, Annabeth Gish joined the cast as Anne Sullivan, a therapist hired by the girls' parents to help them. Also during the second season, Lawson had a minor starring role, being only credited in the episodes she appeared in. For the third season, Tyler Blackburn and Parrish were promoted to the series' starring cast following their recurring appearances. Blackburn left the cast in the fourteenth episode of the fourth season to star in Ravenswood and returned in the fifth episode of the fifth season.

=== Filming ===
The series' pilot was filmed in Vancouver in December 2009. Filming for the series moved to Los Angeles from the second episode onward. The Warner Bros. studio and backlot in Burbank, near Los Angeles, were also used. Filming for the second season wrapped on December 16, 2011. In June 2012, the series was among projects selected for a California tax credit. Filming for the fourth season wrapped on November 2, 2013. The fifth season was filmed between March 24 and November 20, 2014. Filming for the sixth season began on March 24, 2015. Production for the seventh season commenced on February 1, 2016, while filming took place between March and October 2016.

=== Music ===
Michael Suby worked as the series' score composer since its inception. American duo the Pierces' 2007 song "Secret" was used as the series' opening theme, which was suggested by Ashley Benson. WaterTower Music released a soundtrack album titled Pretty Little Liars: Television Soundtrack on February 15, 2011; the release features songs by the Fray, Ben's Brother, MoZella, Katie Herzig, and Colbie Caillat, among others. The show has also featured music by Riley and the Roxies.

To promote the series' third and fifth seasons respectively, American singer ZZ Ward released Pretty Little Liars-themed music videos for her songs "Til the Casket Drops" and "Last Love Song", included on debut studio album, Til the Casket Drops (2012).

== Release ==
Season	DVD and Blu-ray release dates		
Season	Region 1	Region 2	Region 4
1	June 7, 2011	September 24, 2012	November 2, 2011
2	June 5, 2012	November 11, 2013	October 3, 2012
3	June 4, 2013	April 21, 2014	June 19, 2013
4	June 3, 2014	September 29, 2014	July 9, 2014
5	June 2, 2015	July 15, 2015	July 8, 2015
6	April 19, 2016	April 18, 2016	April 20, 2016
7	July 25, 2017	TBA	July 26, 2017
All seasons	July 25, 2017	July 24, 2017	July 26, 2017

=== Broadcast ===
Pretty Little Liars premiered on June 8, 2010, in the United States, becoming ABC Family's highest-rated series debut on record across the network's target demographics. It ranked number one in key 12–34 demos and teens, becoming the number-one scripted show in Women 18–34, and Women 18–49. The premiere was number two in the hour for total viewers, which generated 2.47 million unique viewers, and was ABC Family's best delivery in the time slot since the premiere of The Secret Life of the American Teenager.

The second episode retained 100% of its premiere audience with 2.48 million viewers, despite the usual downward trend following a premiere of a show, and built on its premiere audience. It was the dominant number one of its time slot in Adults 18–49, and the number one show in female teens. Subsequent episodes fluctuated between 2.09 and 2.74 million viewers. The August 10, 2010, "Summer Finale" episode drew an impressive 3.07 million viewers.

On June 28, 2010, ABC Family ordered 12 more episodes of the show, bringing its total first-season order to 22. On January 10, 2011, ABC Family picked the show up for a second season that premiered on June 14, 2011. During the summer of 2011, Pretty Little Liars was basic cable's top scripted series in women aged 18–34 and viewers 12–34. The second half of season 2 aired on Mondays at 8/7c, beginning on January 2, 2012.

On November 29, 2011, ABC Family renewed the show for a third season, which consisted of 24 episodes. On October 4, 2012, ABC Family announced that the show was renewed for a fourth season, again comprising 24 episodes. The second half of the third season began airing on January 8, 2013, and finished on March 19, 2013. Pretty Little Liars returned for Season 4 on June 11, 2013. On March 26, 2013, it was again announced that Pretty Little Liars had been renewed for a fifth season scheduled for a 2014 air date and a new spin off show entitled Ravenswood would begin airing after the season four annual Halloween special in October 2013. The second half of season four premiered on January 7, 2014. It was announced on June 10, 2014, that Pretty Little Liars was renewed for two seasons, making the show ABC Family's longest running original hit series. On August 29, 2016, I. Marlene King announced that Pretty Little Liars would be ending after the seventh season had aired. The second half of the seventh season began airing in April compared to January in the previous season.

=== Marketing ===
Pretty Little Liars was called one of the most spectacular new shows of summer 2010 thanks to heavy promotion by ABC Family, including "spicy promos and hot posters". ABC Family encouraged fans to host a "Pretty Little Premiere Party" for the show by sending the first respondents a fan kit, and selected applicants to become part of an interactive "Secret Keeper Game" played with iPhones provided by the network. The show's official Facebook and Twitter accounts also promoted special fan features, including a "Pretty Little Lie Detector". Los Angeles department store Kitson showcased the show in their shop window.

A tie-in edition featuring the Season 1 poster and logo of the 2006 first novel in the Pretty Little Liars series was released on the date of the show's premiere, as was the final book of the original book series, "Wanted". "Wanted" later decidedly became the eighth book of the series, as Shepard later confirmed she would extend the series. A TV tie-in of the second book "Flawless" featuring an altered Season 3 poster was released on December 28, 2012. Another book titled The Amateurs (2016), was written by Shepard is appeared in a local book store scene from the seventh season episode "The Talented Mr. Rollins", was aired on July 5, 2016.

== Reception ==
=== Critical response ===
Critical response of Pretty Little Liars
Season	Rotten Tomatoes	Metacritic
1	69% (13 reviews)	54 (14 reviews)
2	80% (5 reviews)	—N/a
3	83% (6 reviews)	—N/a
4	100% (8 reviews)	—N/a
5	80% (5 reviews)	—N/a
6	80% (5 reviews)	—N/a
7	78% (9 reviews)	—N/a

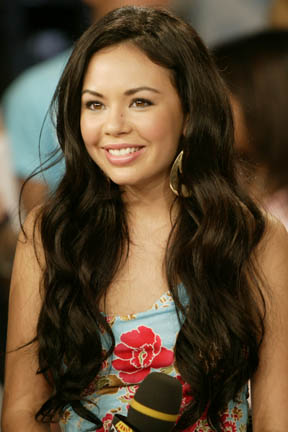
Janel Parrish received widespread critical acclaim and accolades for her performance as Mona Vanderwaal, with critics noting her ability to navigate her character's complex psyche and pathos.

Pretty Little Liars opened with mixed reviews. Metacritic gave the pilot episode 54 out of 100, based upon 14 critical reviews. The New York Daily News gave the show a positive review, commenting that it "makes most popular vampire romances look anemic", while concluding, "Pretty Little Liars could go in several directions, including mundane teen clichés. It's got an equally good shot at making us care about these imperfect pretty girls." A writer on Terror Hook has stated that " 'Pretty Little Liars' gets off to a very promising start. Great production all around, the writing keeps the viewer on their toes, and the acting just reinforces it. The overall mystery of the show in the end is dark and unpredictable, even stepping into the slasher film realm." The New York Post gave the show three out of five stars, stating, "OK, so we've established that there is no socially redeeming value in this series and that your kids shouldn't watch it if they are too young and impressionable. But if you can distract them enough to miss the first 15 minutes, the show isn't half-bad. Actually, it is half-good, if that makes sense." The Los Angeles Times wrote that the series is "one of those shows that manages to mildly, and perhaps unintentionally, spoof its genre while fully participating in it, and that's not a bad thing at all."

Entertainment Weekly had a less favorable review, giving the show a letter grade of "D−", saying, "Imagine the pitch for Liars: It's I Know What You Did Last Summer meets Gossip Girl, but like not so subtle." It went on to say that the plot "hits every racy teen entertainment mark so hard (everyone's hair is so full—of secrets!) that it feels like the only thing missing is a visit from the ghosts of Jennifer Love Hewitt and Freddie Prinze, Jr." The Hollywood Reporter compared the show to those on The CW and noted, "Sure, there's a lot here that sustains more eye-rolling than interested stares, but a little patience might be warranted."

Subsequent seasons attracted positive reception, with the third and fourth seasons in particular receiving critical acclaim. The series has received criticism for its plot lines, which are often cited as overly complicated and full of plot holes. The identity of the final "A" has received harsh criticism from critics and fans, who found the reveal disappointing and nonsensical. The performances of the ensemble cast, particularly Bellisario, Benson, Hale, Mitchell, Parrish and Pieterse, received widespread critical acclaim.

=== Ratings ===
Since the series premiere, Pretty Little Liars has remained popular. In 2016, a New York Times study of the 50 TV shows with the most Facebook Likes found that the show's "popularity is tilted toward women more than any other show in the data — over 94 percent of 'likes' come from women".

The series earned its highest rated episode with 4.20 million total viewers, ranking among ABC Family's top 5 telecasts in adult viewers 18–34, total viewers and women viewers. The highest rated episodes include season one's finale, with 3.64 million, and season two's premiere and finale episodes, each yielding nearly 3.7 million viewers. The show stands as the most watched series on ABC Family, maintaining a steady viewership of over 2.5 million and currently standing as the only show to yield an average of over 2 million viewers.

Viewership and ratings per season of Pretty Little Liars
Season	Timeslot (ET)	Episodes	First aired		Last aired		Avg. viewers (millions)
Season	Timeslot (ET)	Episodes	Date	Viewers (millions)	Date	Viewers (millions)	Avg. viewers (millions)
1	Tuesday 8:00 pm (first set); Monday 8:00pm (second set)	22	June 8, 2010	2.47	March 21, 2011	3.64	2.87
2	Tuesday 8:00 pm (first set); Monday 8:00pm (second set)	25	June 14, 2011	3.68	March 19, 2012	3.69	2.68
3	Tuesday 8:00pm	24	June 5, 2012	2.93	March 19, 2013	2.87	2.59
4	Tuesday 8:00pm	24	June 11, 2013	2.97	March 18, 2014	3.12	2.53
5	Tuesday 8:00pm	25	June 10, 2014	2.72	March 24, 2015	2.65	2.01
6	Tuesday 8:00pm	20	June 2, 2015	2.38	March 15, 2016	1.19	1.72
7	Tuesday 8:00pm	20	June 21, 2016	1.43	June 27, 2017	1.41	1.11

=== Accolades ===
Year	Award	Category	Recipient(s)	Result	Ref.
2010
2010	Teen Choice Awards	Choice Summer TV Show	Pretty Little Liars	Won	
2010	Teen Choice Awards	Choice Summer TV Star: Male	Ian Harding	Won	
2010	Teen Choice Awards	Choice Summer TV Star: Female	Lucy Hale	Won	
2011
2011	NewNowNext Awards	TV You Betta Watch	Pretty Little Liars	Won	
2011	People's Choice Awards	Favorite TV Obsession	Pretty Little Liars	Nominated	
2011	GLAAD Media Awards	Outstanding Drama Series	Pretty Little Liars	Nominated	
2011	Young Hollywood Awards	Cast To Watch	Troian Bellisario, Ashley Benson, Lucy Hale, and Shay Mitchell	Won	
2011	Teen Choice Awards	Choice Summer TV Show	Pretty Little Liars	Won	
2011	Teen Choice Awards	Choice Summer TV Star: Female	Lucy Hale	Won	
2011	Teen Choice Awards	Choice Summer TV Star: Female	Troian Bellisario	Nominated	
2011	Teen Choice Awards	Choice Summer TV Star: Male	Ian Harding	Won	
2011	Teen Choice Awards	Choice Summer TV Star: Male	Keegan Allen	Nominated	
2011	Banff Television Festival	Best Continuing Series	I. Marlene King, Lesli Linka Glatter and Lisa Cochran-Neilan	Won	
2011	Capricho Awards	Best TV Series	Pretty Little Liars	Nominated	
2011	Capricho Awards	Best International Actress	Lucy Hale	Nominated	
2011	Capricho Awards	Best International Actor	Ian Harding	Nominated	
2012	People's Choice Awards	Favorite Cable TV Drama	Pretty Little Liars	Won	
2012	GLAAD Media Awards	Outstanding Drama Series	Pretty Little Liars	Nominated	
2012	TV Guide Awards	Favorite Guilty Pleasure	Pretty Little Liars	Nominated	
2012	Capricho Awards	Best TV Series	Pretty Little Liars	Nominated	
2012	Teen Choice Awards	Choice TV Show: Drama	Pretty Little Liars	Won	
2012	Teen Choice Awards	Choice TV Actor	Ian Harding	Won	
2012	Teen Choice Awards	Choice TV Actress	Lucy Hale	Won	
2012	Teen Choice Awards	Choice TV Villain	Janel Parrish	Won	
2012	Teen Choice Awards	Choice Summer TV Star: Female	Troian Bellisario	Won	
2013	People's Choice Awards	Favorite Cable TV Drama	Pretty Little Liars	Nominated	
2013	People's Choice Awards	Favorite TV Fan Following	Little Liars	Nominated	
2013	Gracie Awards	Outstanding Performance by a Female Rising Star	Lucy Hale	Won	
2013	TV Guide Awards	Favorite Ensemble	Pretty Little Liars	Nominated	
2013	TV Guide Awards	Favorite Villain	Janel Parrish and Keegan Allen	Nominated	
2013	Teen Choice Awards	Choice TV Show: Drama	Pretty Little Liars	Won	
2013	Teen Choice Awards	Choice Summer TV Show	Pretty Little Liars	Won	
2013	Teen Choice Awards	Choice TV Actor: Drama	Ian Harding	Won	
2013	Teen Choice Awards	Choice TV Actress: Drama	Troian Bellisario	Won	
2013	Teen Choice Awards	Choice TV Villain	Janel Parrish	Won	
2013	Teen Choice Awards	Choice Summer TV Star: Female	Lucy Hale	Won	
2013	Teen Choice Awards	Choice Summer TV Star: Male	Keegan Allen	Won	
2013	Capricho Awards	Best TV Series	Pretty Little Liars	Nominated	
2013	Capricho Awards	Best International Actress	Ashley Benson	Nominated	
2014	People's Choice Awards	Favorite Cable TV Drama	Pretty Little Liars	Nominated	
2014	People's Choice Awards	Favorite Cable TV Actress	Lucy Hale	Won	
2014	GLAAD Media Awards	Outstanding Drama Series	Pretty Little Liars	Nominated	
2014	40th Saturn Awards	Best Youth-Oriented Television Series	Pretty Little Liars	Nominated	
2014	Young Hollywood Awards	Bingeworthy TV series	Pretty Little Liars	Nominated	
2014	Young Hollywood Awards	Best Cast Chemistry — TV	Pretty Little Liars	Nominated	
2014	Teen Choice Awards	Choice TV Show: Drama	Pretty Little Liars	Won	
2014	Teen Choice Awards	Choice TV Actor: Drama	Ian Harding	Won	
2014	Teen Choice Awards	Choice TV Actor: Drama	Keegan Allen	Nominated	
2014	Teen Choice Awards	Choice TV Actress: Drama	Lucy Hale	Won	
2014	Teen Choice Awards	Choice TV Actress: Drama	Troian Bellisario	Nominated	
2014	Teen Choice Awards	Choice TV Villain	Janel Parrish	Nominated	
2014	Teen Choice Awards	Choice Summer TV Star: Female	Ashley Benson	Won	
2014	Teen Choice Awards	Choice Summer TV Star: Female	Shay Mitchell	Nominated	
2014	Teen Choice Awards	Choice Summer TV Star: Male	Tyler Blackburn	Won	
2014	Teen Choice Awards	Choice TV Breakout Star: Female	Sasha Pieterse	Won	
2015	People's Choice Awards	Favorite Cable TV Actress	Ashley Benson	Nominated	
2015	People's Choice Awards	Favorite Cable TV Actress	Lucy Hale	Nominated	
2015	People's Choice Awards	Favorite Cable TV Drama	Pretty Little Liars	Won	
2015	GLAAD Media Awards	Outstanding Drama Series	Pretty Little Liars	Nominated	
2015	41st Saturn Awards	Best Youth-Oriented Television Series	Pretty Little Liars	Nominated	
2015	MTV Fandom Awards	Feels Freak Out Of The Year	Pretty Little Liars	Won	
2015	MTV Fandom Awards	Ship of the Year	Shay Mitchell and Sasha Pieterse	Nominated	
2015	Teen Choice Awards	Choice TV Show: Drama	Pretty Little Liars	Won	
2015	Teen Choice Awards	Choice TV Actor: Drama	Ian Harding	Won	
2015	Teen Choice Awards	Choice TV Actor: Drama	Keegan Allen	Nominated	
2015	Teen Choice Awards	Choice TV Actress: Drama	Lucy Hale	Won	
2015	Teen Choice Awards	Choice TV Actress: Drama	Shay Mitchell	Nominated	
2015	Teen Choice Awards	Choice Summer TV Star: Male	Tyler Blackburn	Won	
2015	Teen Choice Awards	Choice Summer TV Star: Female	Troian Bellisario	Nominated	
2015	Teen Choice Awards	Choice Summer TV Star: Female	Ashley Benson	Won	
2015	Teen Choice Awards	Choice TV Scene Stealer	Sasha Pieterse	Nominated	
2015	Teen Choice Awards	Choice TV Villain	Vanessa Ray	Won	
2016
2016	People's Choice Awards				
2016	People's Choice Awards	Favorite Cable TV Drama	Pretty Little Liars	Won	
2016	People's Choice Awards	Favorite Cable TV Actress	Ashley Benson	Nominated	
2016	People's Choice Awards	Favorite Cable TV Actress	Lucy Hale	Nominated	
2016	People's Choice Awards	Favorite Cable TV Actress	Shay Mitchell	Nominated	
2016	Teen Choice Awards				
2016	Teen Choice Awards	Choice TV Show: Drama	Pretty Little Liars	Won	
2016	Teen Choice Awards	Choice TV Actor: Drama	Ian Harding	Won	
2016	Teen Choice Awards	Choice TV Actor: Drama	Tyler Blackburn	Nominated	
2016	Teen Choice Awards	Choice TV Actor: Drama	Keegan Allen	Nominated	
2016	Teen Choice Awards	Choice TV Actress: Drama	Troian Bellisario	Nominated	
2016	Teen Choice Awards	Choice TV Actress: Drama	Ashley Benson	Won	
2016	Teen Choice Awards	Choice TV Villain	Janel Parrish	Won	
2016	Teen Choice Awards	Choice TV Scene Stealer	Sasha Pieterse	Won	
2016	Teen Choice Awards	Choice TV Chemistry	Ashley Benson and Tyler Blackburn	Won	
2016	Teen Choice Awards	Choice Summer TV Actress	Lucy Hale	Nominated	
2016	Teen Choice Awards	Choice Summer TV Actress	Shay Mitchell	Nominated	
2017	People's Choice Awards	Favorite Cable TV Actress	Ashley Benson	Nominated	
2017	People's Choice Awards	Favorite Cable TV Actress	Lucy Hale	Nominated	
2017	People's Choice Awards	Favorite Cable TV Drama	Pretty Little Liars	Nominated	
2017	MTV Movie & TV Awards		Pretty Little Liars		
2017	MTV Movie & TV Awards	Show Of The Year	Pretty Little Liars	Nominated	
2017	Teen Choice Awards		Pretty Little Liars		
2017	Teen Choice Awards	Choice TV Show: Drama	Pretty Little Liars	Nominated	
2017	Teen Choice Awards	Choice TV Actress: Drama	Troian Bellisario	Nominated	
2017	Teen Choice Awards	Choice TV Actress: Drama	Ashley Benson	Nominated	
2017	Teen Choice Awards	Choice TV Actress: Drama	Lucy Hale	Won	
2017	Teen Choice Awards	Choice TV Actress: Drama	Shay Mitchell	Nominated	
2017	Teen Choice Awards	Choice TV Actress: Drama	Sasha Pieterse	Nominated	
2017	Teen Choice Awards	Choice TV Actor: Drama	Ian Harding	Nominated	
2017	Teen Choice Awards	Choice TV Villain	Janel Parrish	Won	
2017	Teen Choice Awards	Choice TV Ship	Shay Mitchell and Sasha Pieterse	Nominated	

== In other media ==
=== Spin-offs ===
==== Ravenswood ====
Ravenswood is a supernatural teen drama mystery-thriller series. Set in the fictional town of Ravenswood, Pennsylvania, the series follows five strangers whose lives become intertwined by a deadly curse that has plagued their town for generations. They have to dig into the town's dark past to solve the mysterious curse. It stars Nicole Gale Anderson, Tyler Blackburn, Steven Cabral, Brett Dier, Britne Oldford and Merritt Patterson.

==== Pretty Little Liars: The Perfectionists ====
Pretty Little Liars: The Perfectionists is a crime thriller mystery drama series, based on the novel The Perfectionists by Sara Shepard, which serves as a stand-alone sequel to the original series. In a town of Beacon Heights, Washington, where everything seems perfect, from their top-tier college to their overachieving residents and the stress of needing to be perfect leads to the town's first murder. Sasha Pieterse and Janel Parrish returned for their roles as Alison DiLaurentis and Mona Vanderwaal, respectively. The series also stars Sofia Carson, Sydney Park, Eli Brown, Hayley Erin, Graeme Thomas King and Kelly Rutherford.

==== Pretty Little Liars ====
On September 2, 2020, it was announced that a new series is in development at Warner Bros., with Riverdale creator Roberto Aguirre-Sacasa taking over as showrunner from I. Marlene King. Although called the series a "reboot", but was later confirmed to be taking place within the existing universe of the franchise and will introduce new characters and storylines. The series was set in a new town where the main characters will pay for their parents' sin nearly 20 years ago. On September 24, 2020, HBO Max gave the spin-off series order, as Aguirre-Sacasa teamup with Lindsay Calhoon Bring to create the series. The series will consist of 10 episodes. In July 2021, Chandler Kinney, Maia Reficco, and Bailee Madison were cast in lead roles, joined by Zaria and Malia Pyles the following month.

=== Web series ===
==== Pretty Dirty Secrets ====
Pretty Dirty Secrets is a web series, which taking place between the events of the third-season episodes "The Lady Killer" and "This Is a Dark Ride". Set in the Rosewood Halloween Spooktacular Store, as the visitors of Rosewood prepared for Halloween.

=== Reunion ===
On May 15, 2020, through a Looped app, TV Guide author Damian Holbrook aired a virtual cast reunion for the series' 10th anniversary and a charity fundraising effort during the COVID-19 pandemic, with the Pretty Little Liars reunion supporting Feeding America. All of the original cast participated, with the event dedicated to those who were affected with the pandemic. In addition to the cast, Ian Harding and Tyler Blackburn and the series' creator I. Marlene King were also present. A second virtual reunion premiered on May 29, 2020, as a part of Wizard World Virtual Experiences, hosted by Mike Gregorek. This edition which includes more cast members from the series including appearances by Pieterse and Parrish. As they discuss behind the scenes moments of the series.

== International adaptation ==
=== Turkish version ===
In 2015, a Turkish adaptation of the series was broadcast on Star TV. Titled Tatlı Küçük Yalancılar (Sweet Little Liars), it was produced by Warner Bros International Television Production.

=== Indonesian version ===
Pretty Little Liars is an Indonesian drama mystery streaming television series produced by Warner Bros International Television Production in collaboration with Asian streaming service Viu. Serving as an adaptation of the original series of the same name, it stars Yuki Kato, Anya Geraldine, Eyka Farhana/Caitlin Halderman, Valerie Thomas, and Shindy Huang as college students whose clique once falls apart after their leader goes mysteriously missing the night of their high school graduation in the fictional town of Amerta, Bali. The series premiered on April 22, 2020, with 10 episodes on 17 countries in Asia and Africa.

=== Cancelled Philippine version ===
A Philippine adaptation of the series was reported from TV5 was set to be released in 2014. However, the network later announced the series was shelved indefinitely.

=== Other adaptations ===
In 2012, Channel V India launched Best Friends Forever?, a non-official version of Pretty Little Liars. The show ran for a total of 140 episodes. An Indonesian version was broadcast on Trans TV in 2017.
