= Ghost Whisperer season 2 =

Ghost Whisperer
- Season 2
- DVD cover
- No. of episodes: 22

Release
- Original network: CBS
- Original release: September 22, 2006 – May 11, 2007

Season chronology
- ← Previous; Season 1 Next → Season 3

The second season of Ghost Whisperer, an American television series created by John Gray, commenced airing in the United States on September 22, 2006, concluded May 11, 2007, and consisted of 22 episodes. The series follows the life of Melinda Gordon (Jennifer Love Hewitt), who has the ability to see and communicate with ghosts. While trying to live as normal a life as possible—she is married and owns an antique store—Melinda helps earthbound spirits resolve their problems and cross over into the Light, or the spirit world. Her tasks are difficult and at times she struggles with people who push her away and disbelieve her ability. In addition, the ghosts are mysterious and sometimes menacing in the beginning and Melinda must use the clues available to her to understand the spirit's needs and help them.

Ghost Whisperer's second season aired in the United States (U.S.) on Fridays at 8:00 pm ET on CBS, a terrestrial television network, where it received an average of 9.90 million viewers per episode.

== Plot ==
In the second season, Melinda crosses over Andrea and meets Delia Banks (Camryn Manheim), her son Ned Banks (Tyler Patrick Jones; Christoph Sanders in later seasons), and Professor Rick Payne (Jay Mohr), all of whom, by season's end, come to learn of Melinda's ability, with varying reactions. Delia remains slightly skeptical. The second season revolves around the thinning veil between the living and the dead. Melinda meets Gabriel, who has similar abilities to hers. But Gabriel is working for the Shadows (as yet unnamed) and working to make sure that ghosts do not cross over into the light, and in fact is working to block the light from all ghosts.

At the end of the season, Melinda finds four children, each of whom have survived a different accident and have been prophecising about a tragedy. Melinda believes she has to protect these children and at the one-year memorial walk for the plane crash, she pushes the children out of the way of a collapsing monument, but is struck and killed by it herself. She sees the light, and a ghost appears and talks to her. The children resurrect Melinda as it was actually their job to protect her. When questioned by Jim, Melinda reveals that she believes the ghost was her father, Tom Gordon (played by Martin Donovan), and that he told her she has a brother.

== Development ==
Ghost Whisperer is based on the work of "Spirit Communicator" James Van Praagh, who is its co-executive producer and regularly updated a blog about the show through LivingTV. The stories are also said to be based in part on the work of "Spirit Communicator" Mary Ann Winkowski. Development of the show dates back to at least two years before its premiere.

The show was produced by Sander/Moses Productions in association with CBS Television Studios (originally Paramount Network Television in season one and ABC Studios (originally Touchstone Television in the first two seasons) and CBS Paramount Network Television in seasons two and three).

The show was filmed on the Universal Studios back lot in Los Angeles. One area on the lot is Courthouse Square from the Back to the Future trilogy, though it has been drastically modified to depict Grandview. For example, the clock tower in Back to the Future has been completely covered up. Cast and crew members believe that the set gets visits from real spirits.

Sound effects were completed at Smart Post Sound. Visual effects for the pilot and some season one episodes were completed at Flash Film Works. Visual effects for nearly the entire series were created at Eden FX.

Creator John Gray grew up in Brooklyn, New York, which is not far from Grandview-On-Hudson, west of the Hudson River. Piermont is often referenced in episodes as the neighboring town, which is accurate to real life as Grandview-On-Hudson is actually located just north of Piermont. Professor Rick Payne worked in the fictional "Rockland University," and perhaps not coincidentally, the actual Grandview, New York is a village located in Rockland County, New York.

== Cast ==
- Jennifer Love Hewitt as Melinda Gordon (22 episodes)
- David Conrad as Jim Clancy (22 episodes)
- Aisha Tyler as Andrea Marino (1 episode)
- Camryn Manheim as Delia Banks (21 episodes)

== Episodes ==
No. overall	No. in season	Title	Directed by	Written by	Original release date	U.S. viewers (millions)
23	1	"Love Never Dies"	John Gray	John Gray	September 22, 2006	10.33
Melinda tries to mourn the loss of her dear friend Andrea, but the mysterious man with the wide brimmed hat will not let her cross over. Alarmed by Andrea’s ghost, Melinda seeks the help of Professor Rick Payne, an expert in the history of the supernatural and the occult. As time runs out, Andrea’s spirit starts to slip away and Melinda must get her to cross over, before it is too late. Final appearance of: Aisha Tyler First appearance of: Jay Mohr
24	2	"Love Still Won't Die"	John Gray	John Gray	September 29, 2006	9.73
Melinda is introduced to Grandview real estate agent Delia Banks, after she catches her son Ned stealing some collectible concert tickets from her store. At first Melinda assumes the young boy has just lost his way, but his behaviour may be the work of a ghost. Melinda's scheming ex-boyfriend Kyle (Michael Landes) pays her a visit from beyond the grave. Kyle wanted make amends to his ex-wife Donna (Lacey Chabert) and Melinda when he broke up with her when Melinda told him that she communicates to dead people. First appearance of: Camryn Manheim, Tyler Patrick Jones
25	3	"Drowned Lives"	Ian Sander	Jed Seidel	October 6, 2006	9.77
Melinda meets a couple who have just moved to Grandview. When they tell her that they think their house is haunted, Melinda befriends them in order to aid the ghost of a 6-year-old girl who drowned there the previous summer.
26	4	"The Ghost Within"	Frederick E.O. Toye	Lois Johnson	October 13, 2006	10.18
Melinda purchases a set of ornaments at a flea market, after a spirit draws them towards her. Melinda struggles at first to understand the ghost's message, but when she touches one of the ornaments, she finds herself transported wherever the ornament depicts in a series of visions to help her understand the ghost's life and his reasons for remaining earthbound in order for her to help him.
27	5	"A Grave Matter"	Eric Laneuville	Catherine Butterfield	October 20, 2006	10.27
Melinda visits the cemetery where Andrea was laid to rest and, whilst there, is called on by the ghost of a man who was buried in the wrong grave. When Melinda tries to get the ghost to cross over by helping him reconcile with his hostile wife and daughter, she is reminded of how her father abandoned her and her mother.
28	6	"The Woman of His Dreams"	John F. Showalter	Catherine Butterfield	October 27, 2006	10.88
Jim has a ghost who died during surgery come to his dreams. Melinda and Jim find that the ghost, a supermodel, cannot cross-over as she wants to save her little sister from suffering the same destiny.
29	7	"A Vicious Cycle"	Eric Laneuville	Jeannine Renshaw	November 3, 2006	11.12
Melinda and Jim's first camping trip is interrupted as Melinda helps the ghost of a woman who left her husband and young daughter. Before the woman can cross over Melinda must find the woman's daughter and help her to learn the truth about her parents' past in order for her to be safe now.
30	8	"The Night We Met"	Peter O'Fallon	David Fallon	November 10, 2006	11.46
The ghost of a chef who died in a fire at a Chinese restaurant meets Melinda after the restaurant he died in burns for a second time. He demands that Melinda go out and find the person that really set the fire he was blamed for. Meanwhile, Mel thinks that Jim has forgotten the anniversary of the day they met.
31	9	"The Curse of the Ninth"	Peter Werner	Breen Frazier	November 17, 2006	10.13
When Melinda meets a nightclub waiter who has not played his guitar since his friend died, she finds that he is being haunted by two ghosts, and must make the mean one leave him alone so he can return to playing music. Mel runs into ghosts who are staying earthbound against their will- being held by dark spirits. Ned learns about Melinda's gift.
32	10	"Giving Up the Ghost"	Peter O'Fallon	Jim Kouf	November 24, 2006	10.57
A high school baseball pitcher Justin finds that he is haunted by the former baseball star pitcher. The ghost is out for revenge on the coach who he blames for his death and Melinda must help him move on so Justin can find his own way.
33	11	"Cat's Claw"	Victoria Hochberg	Jim Kouf	December 15, 2006	9.66
While Melinda is at the University's botany lab she deals with some telekinetic events while dealing with a plant from Peru that is bleeding and makes the connection to a recent jungle expedition that Professor Payne was on, and when she realises he brought the ghost back, she considers telling him about her abilities. Jim's medical knowledge helps Mel discover how the ghost died.
34	12	"Dead to Rights (aka. Dead Reckoning)"	Peter Werner	Wendy Mericle	January 5, 2007	11.18
Melinda has trouble talking to a ghost only to find that it's because he is not dead but is in a coma. While Lisa, his wife is in a legal battle against his parents to take him off of the life support. Meanwhile Delia struggles with teaching Ned about closure while also finding closure for herself (regarding her husband Charlie's death).
35	13	"Déjà Boo"	Gloria Muzio	Lois Johnson	January 12, 2007	10.44
Melinda finds that she must help a ghost who appears to have multiple personality disorder, but when she discovers that they were all real people at various points in time, she must figure out why the ghost can remember them all before she can help him. Melinda briefly thinks she is pregnant. Delia has second thoughts about a dinner date.
36	14	"Speed Demon"	James Frawley	Alan Di Fiore	February 2, 2007	10.66
Melinda's Jeep breaks down on a deserted road and a young woman who owns an auto shop comes by to help. Melinda meets a ghost who comes to her in the form of a skeleton. Melinda must first decipher the mysterious code that is linked to the drag racing society. Melinda finds that Ned is involved with the society and needs his help. Ned lies to his mom and sneaks out to go to the drag races.
37	15	"Mean Ghost"	Ian Sander	Jeannine Renshaw	February 9, 2007	11.16
Melinda gives a speech on her career at Grandview High. While she's at the school she sees a group of cheerleaders who are having some mean and vicious things happening to them just as their cheerleading semi-finals are approaching in just a few days. Melinda discovers why the dead cheerleader can't cross over and someone else has been casting spells on the squad. Starring Mary J. Blige and Madeline Zima.
38	16	"The Cradle Will Rock"	James Chressanthis	Jed Seidel	February 16, 2007	11.35
Melinda accompanies Delia to the local jewelry store so she can get her newly refurbished engagement ring. An armed robbery occurs while they are in the jewellers. Later, the ghost of the jewelry salesman visits Melinda and she ends up going through a terrifying ordeal when the ghost's brother in law kidnaps her and demands she tell him where the money is, leading her to suspect the ghost of involvement in the robbery.
39	17	"The Walk-In"	Eric Laneuville	Breen Frazier	February 23, 2007	9.54
A body goes missing from the morgue and Melinda searches for the body. When the ghost visits Melinda she finds she needs help from Professor Payne to figure it out, since the body is walking around like a zombie- the ghost inside intending to attend his high school reunion.
40	18	"Children of Ghosts"	Frederick E.O. Toye	Teddy Tenenbaum	March 30, 2007	9.36
Melinda and Jim become foster parents temporarily for a young girl whose mother is missing. The ghost of the mother comes to Melinda and tells her where Mel can find her body. The mother confesses a secret to Melinda and Mel and Jim set out to help the little girl, who Professor Payne seems to think has a poltergeist haunting.
41	19	"Delia's First Ghost"	Kim Moses	Jeannine Renshaw	April 6, 2007	9.66
Melinda helps Ned deal with a ghost who had just put a scare into him. Melinda also helps a ghost who appears to her without any clothes on. Delia sees that Melinda is once again talking to herself and Melinda decides it's time to share her gift with Delia, but is drastically unprepared for her sceptical reaction. The ghost of Delia's husband appears to Melinda when he haunts Delia's love interest Tim, but his motives are unclear.
42	20	"The Collector" (Part 1)	Ian Sander	Story by : Melissa Jo Peltier; Teleplay by : Jim Kouf	April 27, 2007	9.20
Melinda meets a man who has the same abilities to see and talk to the dead as she. Melinda later learns that he has a different plan for the dead. A ghost enlists Professor Payne to help Melinda.
43	21	"The Prophet" (Part 2)	John Gray	John Gray	May 4, 2007	9.25
Five accidents, and four signs which means that something else is going to happen. Melinda becomes concerned for the safety of the people she loves when a ghost prophet shows her visions of the future. The fellow Ghost Whisperer, who Melinda doesn't trust is still in Grandview. Final appearance of: Tyler Patrick Jones
44	22	"The Gathering" (Part 3)	John Gray	John Gray	May 11, 2007	9.15
Continued from "The Prophet" Melinda visits the Mayor of Grandview and asks him to cancel or postpone the memorial dedication they are holding for the victims of the plane crash. She speaks to the ghost of a mail person and is looking for a young girl named Kristen, who was rescued from a car with her dead mother's help in the same plane crash, because she is the last puzzle piece with all the children from the various accidents who are all drawing or making things. Later, Melinda and Professor Payne search for the missing children after their Nanny says that they left with a man named Gabriel.
