= Ghost Whisperer season 3 =

Ghost Whisperer
- Season 3
- DVD cover
- No. of episodes: 18

Release
- Original network: CBS
- Original release: September 28, 2007 – May 16, 2008

Season chronology
- ← Previous; Season 2 Next → Season 4

The third season of Ghost Whisperer, an American television series created by John Gray, commenced airing in the United States on September 28, 2007, concluded May 16, 2008, and was originally intended to consist of 22 episodes. However, due to the Writer's Strike, it was shortened to 18 episodes. The series follows the life of Melinda Gordon (Jennifer Love Hewitt), who has the ability to see and communicate with ghosts. While trying to live as normal a life as possible—she is married and owns an antique store—Melinda helps earthbound spirits resolve their problems and cross over into the Light, or the spirit world. Her tasks are difficult and at times she struggles with people who push her away and disbelieve her ability. In addition, the ghosts are mysterious and sometimes menacing in the beginning and Melinda must use the clues available to her to understand the spirit's needs and help them.

Ghost Whisperer's third season aired in the United States (U.S.) on Fridays at 8:00 pm ET on CBS, a terrestrial television network, where it received an average of 8.67 million viewers per episode.

This was the final season to be overseen by John Gray (he would be credited as a consultant on seasons four and five, although he continued to write and direct episodes).

== Plot ==
In the third season, Melinda searches in her family history for answers as she gets closer to learning the secret of her gift, her childhood, and her estranged father. She soon finds out that Gabriel is her step-brother. Melinda finds a series of tunnels which lead to a town buried deep below Grandview, which houses dozens of ghosts.(The tunnel situation is never solved) She soon has dreams about a man in a mask coming to her in her sleep, and believes this is an event from her childhood.

At the end of the season, Tom Gordon (played by Martin Donovan) appears in Grandview alive with Gabriel. It is revealed the man in the mask is Paul Eastman, and Melinda's biological father (Melinda awoke Paul's ghost when searching in the tunnels). In disbelief, Melinda goes with Tom to her childhood home and when they arrive inside, Tom tells her the truth. When she was a child, Tom fell in love with Melinda's mother, Beth, while Paul was in prison. When Paul escaped from prison after a fire and returned home, Tom killed him in order to keep him from Beth and buried him in their basement. When he heard that Melinda was slowly uncovering the evidence, he had to return to Grandview. Tom tries to kill Melinda, but she is saved when Paul's ghost possesses Tom and throws him down a flight of stairs, killing him. The next day, Melinda and her friends meet in the town square. Melinda invites her mother, and the two say goodbye to Paul as he goes into the Light.

== Development ==
Ghost Whisperer is based on the work of "Spirit Communicator" James Van Praagh, who is co-executive producer and regularly updates a blog about the show through LivingTV. The stories are also said to be based in part on the work of "Spirit Communicator" Mary Ann Winkowski. Development of the show dates back to at least two years before its premiere.

The show was produced by Sander/Moses Productions in association with CBS Television Studios (originally Paramount Network Television in season one and ABC Studios (originally Touchstone Television in the first two seasons) and CBS Paramount Network Television in seasons two and three).

The show was filmed on the Universal Studios back lot in Los Angeles. One area on the lot is Courthouse Square from the Back to the Future trilogy, though it has been drastically modified to depict Grandview. For example, the clock tower in Back to the Future has been completely covered up. Cast and crew members believe that the set gets visits from real spirits.

Sound effects were completed at Smart Post Sound. Visual effects for the pilot and some season one episodes were completed at Flash Film Works. Visual effects for nearly the entire series were created at Eden FX.

Creator John Gray grew up in Brooklyn, New York, which is not far from Grandview-On-Hudson, west of the Hudson River. Piermont is often referenced in episodes as the neighboring town, which is accurate to real life as Grandview-On-Hudson is actually located just north of Piermont. Professor Rick Payne worked in the fictional "Rockland University," and perhaps not coincidentally, the actual Grandview, New York is a village located in Rockland County, New York.

== Cast ==
- Jennifer Love Hewitt as Melinda Gordon (18 episodes)
- David Conrad as Jim Clancy (18 episodes)
- Camryn Manheim as Delia Banks (18 episodes)
- Jay Mohr as Rick Payne (14 episodes)
- Christoph Sanders as Ned Banks (4 episodes)

== Episodes ==
No. overall	No. in season	Title	Directed by	Written by	Original release date	U.S. viewers (millions)
45	1	"The Underneath"	John Gray	John Gray	September 28, 2007	8.72
A girl called Jennifer goes to Melinda's store to sell some belongings that came from her deceased parents' house. Melinda then helps Jennifer with her father who died when she was only a toddler. Someone takes photos of Melinda and they show something suspicious. Melinda finds that she has a hidden connection to Grandview while digging into her families past.
46	2	"Don't Try This at Home"	Ian Sander	Teddy Tenenbaum & Laurie McCarthy	October 5, 2007	8.91
Melinda helps a group of college girls after they begin being attacked and the legend of Bloody Mary roars around the campus, terrifying the girls. Melinda does not believe that the ghost is Bloody Mary, and then has to convince the ghost herself of this fact by helping her to remember how she died.
47	3	"Haunted Hero"	Eric Laneuville	Breen Frazier & Karl Schaefer	October 12, 2007	8.90
Melinda helps an Iraq war veteran deal with the ghosts that he has brought back with him, who are stuck in a time loop. The father of one of the ghosts blames the veteran for his sons death after seeing a leaked military video, and he plans to share it with the media, so Melinda must stop him whilst she uncovers the truth behind the mission.
48	4	"No Safe Place"	Peter O'Fallon	Jeannine Renshaw	October 19, 2007	8.95
Melinda's life is in danger when she tries to help the victim of a stalker, who convinces her that the ghost was the stalker, and he then begins stalking Melinda, who then teams up with the ghost to take him down.
49	5	"Weight of What Was"	Gloria Muzio	P.K. Simonds	October 26, 2007	9.99
Gabriel returns to Grandview and Melinda learns more about what is lurking below the town when she discovers a series of tunnels and finds that there is a whole forgotten town underneath. She must help the ghost of another fellow ghost whisperer, Tessa (Amy Acker), understand what happened to cause the mass deaths, and that it was not her fault. During this, Melinda discovers that she is one of Tessa's descendants.
50	6	"Double Exposure"	Eric Laneuville	Laurie McCarthy	November 2, 2007	9.18
Professor Payne is confused when his date, a fellow Rockland professor, refuses to have her picture taken, and it is quickly discovered that she has recently been disappearing from photos. Melinda must discover why the ghost of a girl who drowned is haunting said Professor, but is stumped when she finds the girl still alive. She then has to figure out who the ghost actually is and what his connection to the Professor is.
51	7	"Unhappy Medium"	Frederick E.O. Toye	Breen Frazier	November 9, 2007	9.85
Melinda takes offense when a man who claims to be able to communicate with the dead tells a family that their missing daughter is still alive when she knows the opposite to be true, but she eventually has to work with him to discover the truth behind the ghost's death and in tell the family the truth in order for her to move on. The medium learns some home truths from Melinda about how he does his job.
52	8	"Bad Blood"	Peter Werner	Teddy Tenenbaum	November 16, 2007	9.56
Melinda becomes suspicious of a new house that one of Delia's friends bought in the countryside.
53	9	"All Ghosts Lead to Grandview"	Frederick E.O. Toye	P.K. Simonds & Laurie McCarthy	November 23, 2007	9.98
After stumbling across a runaway girl while camping, Melinda soon discovers that the girl has the same gift as she does. However, when Melinda learns that her parents think their daughter has psychological problems, she must help both the girl and her family cope with the gift that she has been given, all whilst teaching the girl how to use her gift and crossing over the ghost that was haunting the girl in the woods.
54	10	"Holiday Spirit"	Steven Robman	Jeannine Renshaw	December 14, 2007	9.80
Melinda must help a ghost who truly believes he is Father Christmas to understand why he is haunting a specific family and therefore to find his true identity. In the process she ends up missing her planned Christmas dinner with Jim, Delia, Ned and Payne.
55	11	"Slam (a.k.a. Slambook)"	Mark Rosman	Karl Schaefer & Daniel Sinclair	January 11, 2008	9.86
Melinda must go into the complex world of high school dating and gossip, including a website where students can anonymously post nasty things about each other- to find the reason behind hauntings at Ned's school, and to clear the name of the girl who is suspected of causing them, who happens to be the ghost's sister. Melinda is caught on camera talking to the ghost- but it looks like she is talking to herself. First appearance of: Christoph Sanders
56	12	"First Do No Harm"	Ian Sander	John Gray	January 18, 2008	9.91
Melinda has trouble dealing with a ghost who seems to blame Jim for his untimely death, when it seems that he is a man that Jim couldn't save from a recent fire, and in the process, she tells a man it's his brother- and realises her terrible mistake almost too late. However, when she begins her investigation into the ghost’s death, Melinda discovers he is attached to the new doctor in town who he blames for his death, and she must uncover the truth about his death and his illness that led to it in order for him to move on and to discover if the new doctor is really a killer.
57	13	"Home But Not Alone"	Eric Laneuville	P.K. Simonds & Laurie McCarthy	April 4, 2008	9.06
When Ned's new girlfriend and her family are quite clearly haunted, Melinda at first thinks it is their deceased father, who was possibly abusive. The truth is shocking and has serious ramifications for the three siblings.
58	14	"The Grave Sitter"	Frederick E.O. Toye	John Gray	April 11, 2008	8.55
After her store is repeatedly vandalised with a theme of witchcraft, and the culprit is revealed to be the blogger on 'And shame the devil,' Melinda confronts him to ask why he is trying to expose her, but realises that he is possibly being haunted and is shocked when he reveals his secret to her. After he dies, Melinda must help him learn the truth about his late girlfriend and the shipwreck they were both in a few years ago, and also help him to reconnect with his siblings.
59	15	"Horror Show"	Ian Sander	Jeannine Renshaw	April 25, 2008	8.98
Melinda runs into problems, when the victim of a haunting is particularly uncooperative to the investigation into who the ghost is and why he chooses to use scenes from classic horror movies as his hauntings.
60	16	"Deadbeat Dads"	Gloria Muzio	Mark B. Perry	May 2, 2008	9.21
When Professor Payne's ex-girlfriend shows up with a ten year old son who is incredibly smart, it is suspected that he could be Payne's son, which angers his dead wife, who is annoyed that he didn't want kids with her, but this gives Melinda an opportunity to finally cross her over. Also in this episode, we see Zack from 'The Other Side' web series get crossed over.
61	17	"Stranglehold" (Part 1)	Eric Laneuville	P.K. Simonds & Laurie McCarthy	May 9, 2008	8.78
Melinda is given the file number of a murder case for which her father was lead prosecutor in 1979. With the file, Melinda sets out to find whether or not the victim's murder or the trial is linked to her father's disappearance, and discovers that the dead ten year old victim is still hanging around his family, who all seem aware of this, but none more so than his mother, and he is able to temporarily possess people, which causes their spirit to be displaced. Melinda must find out the truth behind the ghost's death (whether or not he was actually murdered) and convince the mother to let him cross over!
62	18	"Pater Familias" (Part 2)	John Gray	John Gray	May 16, 2008	8.44
Melinda realises that the ghost of Paul Eastman (the convicted murderer in the 1979 case from the previous episode) has been possessing her father and causing his spirit to be displaced. Melinda's mother has to reveal a huge secret regarding Paul Eastmann after Mel finds his bones buried in the house she grew up in, and the secret changes everything because when Tom Gordon finds out she knows, she ends up in mortal danger from him.
