= Ghost Whisperer season 4 =

Ghost Whisperer
- Season 4
- DVD cover
- No. of episodes: 23

Release
- Original network: CBS
- Original release: October 3, 2008 – May 15, 2009

Season chronology
- ← Previous; Season 3 Next → Season 5

The fourth season of Ghost Whisperer, an American television series created by John Gray, commenced airing in the United States on October 3, 2008, concluded May 15, 2009, and consisted of 23 episodes. The series follows the life of Melinda Gordon (Jennifer Love Hewitt), who has the ability to see and communicate with ghosts. While trying to live as normal a life as possible—she is married and owns an antique store—Melinda helps earthbound spirits resolve their problems and cross over into the Light, or the spirit world. Her tasks are difficult and at times she struggles with people who push her away and disbelieve her ability. In addition, the ghosts are mysterious and sometimes menacing in the beginning and Melinda must use the clues available to her to understand the spirit's needs and help them.

Ghost Whisperer's fourth season aired in the United States (U.S.) on Fridays at 8:00 pm ET on CBS, a terrestrial television network, where it received an average of 10.62 million viewers per episode, becoming the most watched season of the series.

== Plot ==
In the fourth season, Melinda meets Eli James (Jamie Kennedy) after a fire at Rockland University who, after his own near-death experience, develops the ability to hear ghosts. Melinda says goodbye to her close friend Rick Payne, who leaves Grandview on a research trip for the university. In this season, Jim is shot and killed. He does not "cross over" because he does not want to leave Melinda, and his spirit later enters the body of a man named Sam Lucas, who died in an unrelated accident in Grandview and crossed over. When Jim/Sam regains consciousness, he has no memory of being Jim. Melinda works to get him to remember his past life and her, and succeeds after much difficulty and skepticism on the part of her friends. They soon discover that Melinda is pregnant and that the date of conception was right before Jim died.

At the end of the season, Ned and Eli find the Book of Changes, a book written by the Watchers (a benevolent group of ghosts who keep watch over the living). The book tells them of past and future prominent dates, such as Andrea and Jim's deaths. One date is listed as September 25, 2009; Melinda's due date. Melinda learns from a Watcher named Carl that her child is destined to not only inherit her gift, but be far more powerful than her. Melinda and Jim decide to remarry and have a small ceremony on a snowy night, on the street where they first met.

== Development ==
Ghost Whisperer is based on the work of "Spirit Communicator" James Van Praagh, who is co-executive producer and regularly updates a blog about the show through LivingTV. The stories are also said to be based in part on the work of "Spirit Communicator" Mary Ann Winkowski. Development of the show dates back to at least two years before its premiere.

The show was produced by Sander/Moses Productions in association with CBS Television Studios (originally Paramount Network Television in season one and ABC Studios (originally Touchstone Television in the first two seasons) and CBS Paramount Network Television in seasons two and three).

The show was filmed on the Universal Studios back lot in Los Angeles. One area on the lot is Courthouse Square from the Back to the Future trilogy, though it has been drastically modified to depict Grandview. For example, the clock tower in Back to the Future has been completely covered up. Cast and crew members believe that the set gets visits from real spirits.

Sound effects were completed at Smart Post Sound. Visual effects for the pilot and some season one episodes were completed at Flash Film Works. Visual effects for nearly the entire series were created at Eden FX.

Creator John Gray grew up in Brooklyn, New York, which is not far from Grandview-On-Hudson, west of the Hudson River. Piermont is often referenced in episodes as the neighboring town, which is accurate to real life as Grandview-On-Hudson is actually located just north of Piermont. Professor Rick Payne worked in the fictional "Rockland University," and perhaps not coincidentally, the actual Grandview, New York is a village located in Rockland County, New York.

== Cast ==
- Jennifer Love Hewitt as Melinda Gordon (23 episodes)
- David Conrad as Jim Clancy/Sam Lucas (23 episodes)
- Camryn Manheim as Delia Banks (23 episodes)
- Jay Mohr as Rick Payne (1 episode)
- Christoph Sanders as Ned Banks (13 episodes)
- Jamie Kennedy as Eli James (23 episodes)

== Episodes ==
| No. overall | No. in season | Title | Directed by | Written by | Original release date | U.S. viewers (millions) |
|---|---|---|---|---|---|---|
| 63 | 1 | "Firestarter" | Eric Laneuville | P.K. Simonds | October 3, 2008 | 9.44 |
Melinda hears that there has been a fire at the Rockland University Building when Jim is called over there and hurries over, fearful for Professor Rick Payne, but he is revealed to be alive and well. However, a therapist by the name of Eli James dies and Melinda witnesses his soul being brought back. This 'near-death' experience grants him the ability to hear ghosts. The episode is focused on the ghost of one of Eli's patients, who was possibly more than that, and whether or not she has been starting fires since she was 12. Whilst Melinda is trapped in the archives, she meets a group of seemingly benign ghosts calling themselves the watchers, who warn her that dealing with death may brush off on something she loves. Note: This was Jay Mohr's last appearance as Professor Payne. First appearance of Jamie Kennedy as Eli James. Guest Star: Alona Tal as Fiona Raine
| 64 | 2 | "Big Chills" | Peter Werner | Laurie McCarthy | October 10, 2008 | 9.69 |
A woman finds her friend dead and strange things start happening around her. She remembers Melinda's abilities from high school (not that she ever believed it before) and calls on her for help. Mel quickly uncovers the story - Grace, her current boyfriend and the dead friend were in a car accident with a motorcyclist 10 years ago and they left him for dead. The guilt ate away at the dead friend but when he tried to go to the police, the other two stopped him. Melinda must tell the motorcyclists family what happened to him in order for the ghost to move on.
| 65 | 3 | "Ghost in the Machine" | Steven Robman | Jeannine Renshaw | October 17, 2008 | 8.97 |
Melinda watches Ned playing a computer game, and notices one of the Avatars staring directly at her. He appears in her shop, making her realise she has pulled him out of the game. She realises he is a ghost who appears as his Avatar because that is how he remembers himself. He died whilst playing the game. After realising that this Ghost/Avatar,'Phoenix', is usually hanging around with a teenage girl in the game, Mel, Ned and Eli suspect that he is a Predator, and proceed to try to catch him. Melinda sets up an Avatar and enters the game, and eventually discovers that 'Phoenix' is the girl's father, and is actually trying to protect his daughter from the real Predator, whom they then must work together to catch.
| 66 | 4 | "Save Our Souls" | Gloria Muzio | Mark B. Perry | October 24, 2008 | 10.14 |
Melinda and Jim go to a cruise ship that is going to be scrapped soon and meet the newlywed couple staying in the room next to theirs who want to swap because they are having problems with their room and marriage. Mel sees many ghosts on the ship and one is very friendly and helpful. Mel realises room M108 is haunted by a ghost who is looking for her fiancé and swaps rooms so she can help her. She figures out the story of how the ghost died and who her fiancé was- he happens to be the owner of the ship, and has to get him to help the ghost cross over. Guest Star: Solange Knowles as cruise singer.
| 67 | 5 | "Bloodline" | Ian Sander | Melissa Blake & Joy Blake | October 31, 2008 | 9.40 |
A teenager dies while playing tennis with Ned and a friend, and her ghost starts haunting the girl. Mel finds out that the two girls used to be friends until their mothers stopped talking and one family moved away. After the discovery that the blood clot that killed Diana is a genetic condition, it is revealed that the girls were swapped at birth. The ghost tries to stop Melinda revealing the truth.
| 68 | 6 | "Imaginary Friends and Enemies" | Eric Laneuville | Vivian Lee & Ann Shrake | November 7, 2008 | 11.06 |
Mel and Jim visit an old lodge with an old friend, her daughter and her new fiancé, and Melinda quickly realises that the little girl's imaginary friend is actually a ghost. The ghost seems obsessed with the girl's mother, and wants to play a game with her, but the game ends up hurting the mother. It is later revealed that the mother used to be friends with the ghost (when he was alive and after), and he is trying to warn her about someone, using a clues game they used to play. Melinda has to convince Tricia to play the game and work out the clues. Jim is shot.
| 69 | 7 | "Threshold" | John Gray | John Gray | November 14, 2008 | 11.57 |
Jim meets his brother in the in-between state, but decides that he needs to stay behind to be with Mel, since she's not coping without him. She can't see him even though he's there, because her grief is strengthening the veil, but there is another ghost who wants her help, and she mistakes the signs as being from Jim. Eventually he gets through to her, and she tries to convince him to cross over, but he refuses. The other ghost is revealed to be the recently deceased stepdaughter of the man who shot Jim. At an accident, a man dies and goes into the light, and Jim steps into the body, despite Melinda's warning.
| 70 | 8 | "Heart & Soul" | Ian Sander | Mark B. Perry & P.K. Simonds | November 21, 2008 | 11.28 |
Jim/Sam has no memory of being Sam and very little of being Jim, and Melinda tries to help, wanting the love of her life back. He visits Sam's family but eventually accepts Mel's offer to fix up her garage and live there whilst doing so. Delia doesn't believe Melinda about Jim's spirit stepping into Sam's body. Jim/Sam is concerned about what might be going on between him and Melinda, thinking they were having an affair, and she assures him she would never cheat on her husband. She starts to tell him about the whole Jim/Sam thing, but his reaction stops her. Delia believes Mel about Jim/Sam after seeing him waiting for Ned at the basketball court, and convinces him to stay.
| 71 | 9 | "Pieces of You" | Jim Chressanthis | Laurie McCarthy | December 5, 2008 | 9.71 |
Whilst doing work at a house, Jim/Sam hears a car backfire and remembers being shot, which he finds weird, but Mel sees it as a sign of Jim still being in there somewhere. Meanwhile, Mel has to help the ghost of a little girl who is haunting a wishing well.
| 72 | 10 | "Ball & Chain" | Eric Laneuville | Christina M. Kim & Jeannine Renshaw | December 19, 2008 | 10.18 |
Whilst searching for clues about who he is, Jim/Sam finds an engagement ring Sam was planning on giving his on/off girlfriend, bought a month before his accident. Mel has to unravel the mystery behind a ghost's death, since the ghost is convinced she didn't abandon her family.
| 73 | 11 | "Life on the Line" | Eric Laneuville | Christina M. Kim & Jeannine Renshaw | January 9, 2009 | 10.64 |
Delia is selling a house and she and Mel find it odd that there are still so many family photos and personal effects everywhere. Ned finds the lawnmower and awakens a ghost, who resends an old 911 call made from the house. This leads Melinda to investigate, and she discovers that a 14-year-old boy was killed by the lawnmower there. She must uncover the truth behind the accident and get the family back together for the ghost to move on. Also, Sam remembers medical procedures, indicating that more of Jim's past is coming up. He also tries to find evidence of his fiancé in his personal effects including looking through his sent emails.
| 74 | 12 | "This Joint's Haunted" | Mark Rosman | Mark B. Perry | January 16, 2009 | 10.58 |
Delia throws a dinner party for a couple of her high school friends and Eli who quickly hears a ghost about the place. Ned housesits for Mel whilst she goes on a road trip with Sam who is trying to find his fiancé in the hope that she can help with regaining his memory. Mel has to help a few ghosts along the way, all without revealing her abilities to Sam. The ghost in Delia's house is trying to stop her from being so hard on Ned because she blames her own parents for her death. Sam's fiancé comes to see him and finally believes him about the amnesia.
| 75 | 13 | "Body of Water" | Jennifer Love Hewitt | P.K. Simonds & Laurie McCarthy | January 23, 2009 | 11.18 |
A girl swims in a lake and is scared away. It is later discovered that there are many dead bodies in the lake and one of them is the girls' father. Mel and Eli have to figure out what happened to the bodies to stop the ghosts from being so angry and helping them move on, and it has something to do with the owner of the funeral home, who now has cancer and won't take his medication. Sam's fiancé Nikki ends up staying with Mel and spending a lot of time with Sam, which worries Delia, who urges Mel to fight for him. The Watchers return and warn Mel again, and she learns that they chose to stay earthbound to help the living. After his past life regression session with Eli, Sam remembers loving Mel, but he thinks he is remembering Nikki. Note: This episode was Jennifer Love Hewitt's directorial debut.
| 76 | 14 | "Slow Burn" | Steven Robman | Jeannine Renshaw | February 6, 2009 | 11.41 |
Delia asks Sam and Mel to help her chaperone Ned's school dance, and Mel sees a ghost trying to stop a girl leaving with an older boy. She quickly realises the ghost is the girl's mother, and must figure out why she doesn't want the two to be together, with very little help from the ghost herself. Delia and Eli help her. Sam asks Melinda on a date and she accepts, but helping the ghost causes her to miss it, and leads Sam to think she's not ready to date after losing her husband. Guest Star: Kendall Schmidt as Jeff
| 77 | 15 | "Greek Tragedy" | Karen Gaviola | Christina M. Kim | February 13, 2009 | 10.30 |
A sorority at Rockland University 'hazes' new members with a brutal ritual, and one girl never returns the next day, which is a first. Mel plans a date with Sam and promises Delia no ghost business, but is unable to help herself when she sees a ghost with a bag over her head, immediately thinking it is the missing girl. Eli works with her to figure out how she died, but the ghost is not whom they thought she was at all. She died forty years ago after trying to make amends for the horrible things she did as a sorority leader. Mel told Sam she was volunteering at the firehouse, and when he asks about her there he finds that she never signed in, but he sees her on TV at the Rescue mission. He asks her about it and she lies, making him suspicious.
| 78 | 16 | "Ghost Busted" | John Behring | Mark B. Perry & P.K. Simonds | February 27, 2009 | 11.54 |
Melinda's neighbours hire a ghost hunter right when she was about to tell Sam about her gift, and after seeing his sceptical reaction, she holds off on telling him, despite Delia's urging otherwise. Eli hangs out with the ghost hunter and accidentally reveals his own gift, ending up thinking the ghost hunter is legit, and they incorrectly deduce that the ghost is the house's previous owner. Eli lies to Sam when he asks questions about Mel, and Delia tells him to keep an open mind. Mel works out who the ghost really is and helps him move on, finally tells Sam about her gift, and is crushed when he is sceptical. Guest Star: Jenna Leigh Green as Carrie
| 79 | 17 | "Delusions of Grandview" | Jefery Levy | Laurie McCarthy & Mark B. Perry | March 6, 2009 | 11.09 |
Sam wants to see Melinda doing her thing, and follows her to a school where he's been doing work. Mel quickly sees ghosts and works out that they are patients of the mental hospital that the school used to be. One ghost in particular needs her help, she was admitted to the hospital after supposedly drowning her baby. Sam goes into the tunnels with Melinda, and gets freaked out when she has a vision of how the ghost died, which involved electro-shock therapy. Delia and Eli work out that the ghost's doctor was a ghost himself, and she is trying to protect the children in the school from him. Mel finally tells Sam about him being Jim, and he refuses to believe it, instead thinking that Mel needs professional help.
| 80 | 18 | "Leap of Faith" | Ian Sander | P.K. Simonds & Laurie McCarthy | March 13, 2009 | 10.58 |
Sam moved out at Melinda's request, but he forgot something, so tries calling her to ask for it, but she won't answer his calls. Mel is scared by a break-in at her shop, especially when Dr Byrd's ghost shows up again. Eli goes to see the guy who broke in and discovers that he is another step-in (like what Jim did to Sam). Mel deduces that Dr Byrd is behind the step-ins, and works out that he wants another body for himself. Mel realises the other step-in is lost and confused somewhere in the tunnels and goes to find and help him, but the water valve has broken and the place is quickly filling with water. Byrd goes to get Eli and Sam is sceptical of his belief in a ghost he doesn't trust, but follows him down anyway. Since Eli can't swim, Sam goes to rescue Mel, and after his bag gets trapped on something, Jim's life flashes before his eyes.
| 81 | 19 | "Thrilled to Death" | Gloria Muzio | Laurie McCarthy & Jeannine Renshaw | April 10, 2009 | 10.08 |
A young woman in Eli's apartment building is being haunted, but claims she doesn't know anyone who has died. Mel and Eli investigate together and figure out who the ghost is, and when they find out that Morgan was lying about knowing him, they wonder what else she's been lying about, and quickly discover that she is ill herself. Meanwhile, Jim misses his job and friends but realises that can't be his life anymore, and he eventually decides he wants to go to Med School. Mel and Eli realise there is much more to Morgan's story, and have to stop the ghost hurting her out of his anger at being lied to. Guest Star: Hilary Duff as Morgan.
| 82 | 20 | "Stage Fright" | Eric Laneuville | Mark B. Perry | April 24, 2009 | 9.23 |
A TV show is shooting in Grandview and wants to use Melinda's store. Mel, Delia, Jim and Eli go to a Promotional Event, and Mel and Eli quickly pick up that a ghost is haunting the writer of the show and the lead male actor, and is also involving a seemingly random girl in the audience. They discover that they were all in a play together and the ghost was shot on stage when the blank gun malfunctioned. Mel and Eli think he blames the other three for his death and Eli jumps to the conclusion that the ghost is trying to kill someone on the show. They have to unravel the truth behind what happened in the play all those years ago so the ghost can cross over. After an accident shooting a walk-on part, Jim takes Mel to the hospital and they get some great news. Guest Star: Amelia Heinle as Brook Dennis.
| 83 | 21 | "Cursed" | Kim Moses | Laurie McCarthy | May 1, 2009 | 9.79 |
A little girl comes into the store, searching for a very specific doll, and when the older girl (a cousin) explains that it is for a replica dollhouse of the house in which the older girl lived with her family before they died, and that the dolls 'talk' to the little girl. Melinda suspects that the spirits of Emma's family are trapped in the dollhouse. She investigates until she finds out the truth behind their deaths, leading her to think that the little girl's mother (and Emma's Aunt) killed the family for their money and wants to hurt Emma. Mel tells Delia she's pregnant, then discovers that she's lost her wedding bands. Jim proposes again.
| 84 | 22 | "Endless Love" | Ian Sander | P.K. Simonds | May 8, 2009 | 9.50 |
Melinda is at Delia's when she realises that one of the girls, Serena, in Ned's study group is being haunted. After a sleepwalking incident, Mel and Eli try to work out who the ghost is and what he wants. Eli's friend Zoe (who told him about Voodoo in the previous episode) recognises the hauntings as Vampire Myths, leading Mel to wonder if Serena knew the ghost, and whether she was into Vampires. When she tries to ask her about it, Serena ends up thinking Vampires are real, and is surprised when Mel reveals she was talking about a ghost. The ghost leads Serena to his crypt after she says she wants to see him, and Mel has to race against time to get there and get her out of the sealed crypt before all the oxygen runs out. Also, Mel and Jim plan their second wedding. Guest Star: Alexa Vega as Serena
| 85 | 23 | "The Book of Changes" | John Gray | John Gray | May 15, 2009 | 9.15 |
Melinda's mother hires a wedding planner who completely ignores what the couple want. Someone breaks into the University Library and then Zoe's house, but is interrupted by Eli. The thief only stole one book- called 'The Book of Changes' by the Watchers. It has important dates in it, such as previous deaths and Melinda's due date, which is why Carl the Watcher tells Eli not to let Melinda see or touch the book. Because the collection in which it was hidden is being bought, the Watchers are trying to protect it. Melinda keeps getting visions of a faceless girl holding the book and saying that Mel's future is in 'her' hands and that Mel can't save 'her'. Mel is scared for her unborn baby, especially when she learns that it will be able to do much more than her (with their gift). Jim and Mel have a quiet wedding on the street where they first met, with only Delia and Eli in attendance, and Jim calls it a renewal of everything they already had and have. Mel is told she has much white light around her-spirits protecting her, but if the balance slips, that could change. Eli becomes 'The Book of Changes' new caretaker.
