= Ghost Whisperer season 5 =

Ghost Whisperer
- Season 5
- DVD cover
- No. of episodes: 22

Release
- Original network: CBS
- Original release: September 25, 2009 – May 21, 2010

Season chronology
- ← Previous; Season 4

The fifth and final season of Ghost Whisperer, an American television series created by John Gray, commenced airing in the United States on September 25, 2009, concluded May 21, 2010, and consisted of 22 episodes. The series follows the life of Melinda Gordon (Jennifer Love Hewitt), who has the ability to see and communicate with ghosts. While trying to live as normal a life as possible—she is married and owns an antique store—Melinda helps earthbound spirits resolve their problems and cross over into the Light, or the spirit world. Her tasks are difficult and at times she struggles with people who push her away and disbelieve her ability. In addition, the ghosts are mysterious and sometimes menacing in the beginning and Melinda must use the clues available to her to understand the spirit's needs and help them.

Ghost Whisperer's fifth and final season aired in the United States (U.S.) on Fridays at 8:00 pm ET on CBS, where it received an average of 7.78 million viewers per episode, becoming the least watched season of the series.

== Plot ==
In the fifth season, five years have elapsed since the events of the previous season, and we are introduced to Jim and Melinda's son, Aiden Lucas. We learn that he can see the "Shinies and the Shadows", two opposing groups of ghosts that Melinda is unable to see. The Shadows are revealed to be the negative part of spirits that get left behind when they cross over, and their motives involve acquiring the Book of Changes. Melinda, Ned, and Eli, with the frequent help of Delia, work to keep the book safe from the Shadows. Throughout the season, Melinda struggles to keep Aiden safe and help him with his gift. He has frequent run-ins with the Shinies, who are presumed to be the kind group of spirits and are attracted to shiny objects. The Shadows show tremendous power throughout the season, forcing President Bedford, the president of Rockland University to blow up Delia's real estate office.

At the end of the series, Melinda and Jim try to protect Aiden by convincing him that ghosts don't exist (at the advice of Carl the Watcher, later revealed to be under the influence of the Shadows). The Shadows gradually begin to take possession of Melinda's body. Aiden is told by Carl that he must go to Melinda's store. Jim, Ned, Eli and Delia follow with him. Melinda is inside, being engulfed by the Shadows. Aiden, who has forged a friendship with one of the Shinies (previously revealed to be the ghosts of children), enlists their help. In the town square, dozens of Shinies gather, and emit a bright light. The Shinies and their light become visible to passersby in the square. Inside the store, the Shadows are trying to battle the light and fully possess Melinda, but fail on both accounts. Melinda drops to the ground and the group run in. Outside, in the residual light from the Shinies, we see the Shadows apparently being dispersed and presumable destroyed. Later that night, Aiden is in his room and Melinda and Jim enter. Melinda tells him that they should both be proud of their gift and that he was her hero that night. Aiden replies that Melinda is a hero every day, and the series closes with a shot of Melinda smiling and tearing up.

== Development ==
Ghost Whisperer is based on the work of "Spirit Communicator" James Van Praagh, who is co-executive producer and regularly updates a blog about the show through LivingTV. The stories are also said to be based in part on the work of "Spirit Communicator" Mary Ann Winkowski. Development of the show dates back to at least two years before its premiere.

The show was produced by Sander/Moses Productions in association with CBS Television Studios (originally Paramount Network Television in season one and ABC Studios (originally Touchstone Television in the first two seasons) and CBS Paramount Network Television in seasons two and three).

The show was filmed on the Universal Studios back lot in Los Angeles. One area on the lot is Courthouse Square from the Back to the Future trilogy, though it has been drastically modified to depict Grandview. For example, the clock tower in Back to the Future has been completely covered up. Cast and crew members believe that the set gets visits from real spirits.

Sound effects were completed at Smart Post Sound. Visual effects for the pilot and some season one episodes were completed at Flash Film Works. Visual effects for nearly the entire series were created at Eden FX.

Creator John Gray grew up in Brooklyn, New York, which is not far from Grandview-On-Hudson, west of the Hudson River. Piermont is often referenced in episodes as the neighboring town, which is accurate to real life as Grandview-On-Hudson is actually located just north of Piermont. Professor Rick Payne worked in the fictional "Rockland University", and perhaps not coincidentally, the actual Grandview, New York is a village located in Rockland County, New York.

== Syndication ==
On May 5, 2008, it was announced that the first three seasons of Ghost Whisperer were purchased for $169.8 million ($700,000 per episode, per network) for syndication by SyFy, ION Television, and WE TV. Episodes began airing in Summer 2009 on ION, and in Fall 2009 on SyFy and WE. The first four seasons began airing in syndication on CBC Television in Canada on August 31, 2009.

== Cancellation ==
On May 18, 2010, citing rising costs and a decline in viewership, CBS announced that Ghost Whisperer would not be renewed for another season. On May 18, 2010, CBS cancelled the show after five seasons. ABC expressed interest in picking up Ghost Whisperer for Fall 2010. It was revealed on May 19, that writers of the show were informed to not look for other jobs yet, and the producers were very optimistic that there was a good chance of Ghost Whisperer being renewed by ABC. On May 27, 2010, Michael Ausiello reported that ABC had passed on renewing Ghost Whisperer for its sixth season.

In October 2010, Jennifer Love Hewitt thanked the fans of the show for their support in a goodbye video saying, "Your love and support has meant everything to the cast and crew of Ghost Whisperer and we will all miss you guys very, very much. Go get our DVDs, think about us, miss us and know how much we all will miss you. Much love." She was visibly emotional during the video and simply waved to the camera at the end of the video as she was unable to finish speaking.

== Cast ==
- Jennifer Love Hewitt as Melinda Gordon (22 episodes)
- David Conrad as Jim Clancy/Sam Lucas (22 episodes)
- Camryn Manheim as Delia Banks (18 episodes)
- Christoph Sanders as Ned Banks (14 episodes)
- Jamie Kennedy as Eli James (22 episodes)
- Connor Gibbs as Aiden Lucas (22 episodes)

== Episodes ==
No. overall	No. in season	Title	Directed by	Written by	Original release date	U.S. viewers (millions)
86	1	"Birthday Presence"	Jennifer Love Hewitt	P.K. Simonds & Laurie McCarthy	September 25, 2009	8.76
Melinda undergoes immediate C-Section and then gives birth to a baby boy whom they name Aiden, after Jim's father. Then five years later, Aiden also has the gift of seeing spirits. A woman who died during childbirth is determined to be reunited with her son, whom she thinks jumped into Aiden's body after she gave birth to her son that she thought died. Carl reveals that Aiden is an empath.
87	2	"See No Evil"	Eric Laneuville	Jeannine Renshaw	October 2, 2009	7.62
Ned is with a girl in her college dorm when a haunting occurs, and he calls Melinda. It is soon discovered that the hauntings are connected to a chain email about 'Sally Stitch'. The ghost thinks that her decision not to forward it was what caused the car accident that left her mother in a coma, and is terrorizing people to make sure they forward it, thinking that will save her mother, but her mother is sicker than she knew. A little girl who has terminal cancer and lives in the hospital turns out to be the creator of the email.
88	3	"Till Death Do Us Start"	Gloria Muzio	Mark B. Perry	October 9, 2009	8.78
Eli's childhood friend Casey takes his dad to the hospital where he dies, seven years after his wife. It was thought she crossed over but it turns out she didn't. Eli works out that his dad is keeping him and Casey apart, and after Mel has visions, she realises that Casey might be his half sister, since there was an affair going on with a pair of the parents. The truth surprises everybody.
89	4	"Do Over"	John Gray	John Gray	October 16, 2009	8.05
After some kids break into the hospital morgue, it is revealed to be haunted. When Jim brings home a surgical instrument from the 1950s, Melinda starts seeing visions of a cardiac surgery where the patient died on the table. The doctor feels guilty for making a mistake that killed the patient, and that is what is keeping him earthbound. Mel must try to help the ghost cross over. Meanwhile, Delia is romanced by a secret admirer.
90	5	"Cause for Alarm"	Ian Sander	Melissa Blake & Joy Blake	October 23, 2009	8.59
Eli treats a patient who is a shut-in and has serious OCD about security. After discovering that his sister died when she was 9 years old, Melinda and Eli think that she is the ghost that's haunting him, but when Mel hears an audio clip of what everyone else thinks is footsteps, she realises it is an unborn baby's heartbeat, meaning that the ghost is/was pregnant. Mel and Eli must work out who the ghost is and stop her son from doing something stupid for revenge. Melinda is worried when Aiden reveals he has 'shiny' friends who are not ghosts, because she can't see them.
91	6	"Head Over Heels"	Steven Robman	Laurie McCarthy & Stephanie SenGupta	October 30, 2009	8.29
It's Halloween and after a child sneaks the book, The Legend of Sleepy Hollow into school, Mel starts having visions of a headless horseman. When Aiden's teacher drops some stuff from her recently deceased father off at the store, Mel gets visions from the costumes and equestrian gear. She eventually figures out that the ghost is the old boyfriend of the teacher, who broke his neck falling from a horse when running from accusations that he was stealing. Melinda has to unravel the truth and mystery behind a costume party years ago to help the ghost cross over. Aiden reveals what the "shadows" and "shinies" are- good and bad parts of people, the bad bits left behind (shadows).
92	7	"Devil's Bargain"	James Chressanthis	Mark B. Perry & P.K. Simonds	November 6, 2009	7.99
Dr. Morgan from the hospital and the President of the University-Dr Bedford become suspects in the death of a young medical student. After we see that Bedford is terrified of beings who can possess his comatose mother, and Melinda feels an entity that goes inside her and is extremely cold, we learn more about the shadows. Ghosts are terrified of the shadows.
93	8	"Dead Listing"	Peter Werner	Laurie McCarthy & Mark B. Perry	November 13, 2009	8.06
A ghost comes to Melinda, wanting her to find his body, and reveals that he believes his wife killed him. Mel uncovers that they were having a feud, trying to hurt each other and derail their real estate careers. She has to find out what really went on and whether his wife really did kill him. Meanwhile, when Aiden's friends do magic, he feels left out, so Jim gets him a Junior Magic Kit, but after learning that ghosts are helping him do the tricks, Mel and Jim must stop him.
94	9	"Lost in the Shadows"	Kim Moses	P.K. Simonds & Laurie McCarthy	November 20, 2009	8.42
Melinda find the ghost of the girl who created the "Sally Stitch" email chain in Aiden's closet, and she refuses to cross over. Soon after, Aiden goes missing, and Melinda knows that Julia (the ghost girl) took him. Julia is terrified of something happening to her ghost friends, and she is attacked by the shadows. Aiden saves her and when she talks to her parents, she realizes that she didn't kill her friend like she thought she did, and crosses over.
95	10	"Excessive Forces"	Kenny Leon	Stephanie SenGupta	December 4, 2009	8.18
When Eli gets pulled over by a policeman, he and Mel uncover the suspicious death of a teenage boy labelled as a skateboarding accident. Mel's car gets scrapped and she thinks it was the police officer. She also thinks he killed the boy after a series of visions. She thinks the reason is that the kid was dating the policeman's daughter and he was not happy about it. She must uncover the truth behind the kids death in order for him to cross over.
96	11	"Dead Air"	Gloria Muzio	Laurie McCarthy & Mark B. Perry	January 8, 2010	9.00
After Ned does a telephone prank on his college radio station, saying that a guy is leaving his girlfriend for another girl, a woman comes to the station and angrily states that it happened to her eight years ago and it's not funny. Eventually, Melinda discovers that this woman set up her husband to try to find out if he was cheating, since she had trust issues, it led to their divorce, and he married the woman he named on air. They weren't together at that time. It turns out her fiancé was jealous too and drowned driving to the station to stop them.
97	12	"Blessings in Disguise"	Jan Eliasberg	Jeannine Renshaw & Ben Chaney	January 15, 2010	8.61
Delia realises that a family who moved in recently haven't yet signed the lease, and when Ned recognises the girl's name, he offers to take it over there as an excuse to talk to her. Mel witnesses the boy get attacked by soda bottles at the gas station and has a vision of being kneedeep in mud. She notices the parents odd reaction to their son's accident. Ned is with the daughter during a haunting. After a vision, Mel thinks that the son hurt a girl and the family are protecting him, but the truth couldn't be more different. Guest star: Candace Bailey
98	13	"Living Nightmare"	Ian Sander	P.K. Simonds	January 29, 2010	8.61
Jim is working extra shifts at the hospital, and a man comes in screaming about being chased by a man with a knife. He is being haunted, and Melinda soon discovers that the ghost is his birth father, who had a fatal insomnia disease he may have passed on to his kids. He talks about seeing demons who get into your head when you're asleep, which is why he won't allow his son to sleep. Mel has to tell him the truth about his disease to prevent him from making his son kill himself.
99	14	"Dead to Me"	Ralph Hemecker	Pam Norris	February 5, 2010	8.73
After Ned brings his 'Anthropology of the Occult' teacher (Avery) a spirit board and she starts getting haunted, she has to forget everything she thought she knew about the paranormal world in order for Melinda to help her. At first, Mel, Ned and Eli think the ghost might be her late fiancé Curtis, who died three years ago. However, it turns out to be the daughter of the guy driving the car that killed him and herself (probably blaming Avery for her death) because she'd sent the text Curtis was answering at the time of the accident. Melinda gets a message on the spirit board she took away from Ned-that someone they know will die soon. Special guest star: Margaret Cho as Professor Avery Grant
100	15	"Implosion"	Jennifer Love Hewitt	John Gray	March 5, 2010	7.35
Melinda gets a military collection in the store, and when she realizes there is a ghost attached to one of the items, she follows the guy who sold it to her, to see where he gets it from. Turns out he was robbing an old army base, and when a ghost tells Mel and Eli there is unexploded ordnance on the site, they wonder if that's what killed the ghost (a little boy). The boy is revealed to have gone missing right around when the hauntings started, and he reveals to Mel and Eli that he saw Bedford take a live bomb from the base. Bedford threatens to kill Delia if he doesn't get the Book of Changes, so Ned and Eli forget about taking turns to hide the book, and come up with a plan to save Delia. The shadows are angry when the Book is blank.
101	16	"Old Sins Cast Long Shadows"	Jefery Levy	Mark B. Perry	March 12, 2010	7.22
A woman comes to Mel's shop to sell antiques from a house she's moving from after the death of her daughter (from an illness). Melinda very quickly discovers that the house is haunted by violent spirits after Ned gets hurt there-which doesn't go down well with Delia- and she realizes that the ghost of the little girl (Cassidy) is being trapped there. Melinda has to work out whether the ghosts are murderers or murder victims, and figure out how the previous owner of the house-'Madame Greta' is involved. Delia wants Ned to stop getting involved with ghosts because she feels it is getting too dangerous, she is shaken up from the explosion at her office. Guest Starring: Joey King
102	17	"On Thin Ice"	Ian Sander	Melissa Blake & Joy Blake	April 2, 2010	5.96
A graphic novelist comes to Mel's store looking for Delia. He wants a new studio. After he is nearly impaled by icicles outside the store, Mel and Eli see a picture he posted to his blog a whole day before, exactly like that scene. After another scene comes true, Melinda realizes that the ghost is possessing him and creating automatic drawings, warning him about what will happen to him next. Eventually, Mel figures out who the ghost is and what he wants, and has to talk to his dad, stepmother and stepbrother to help him cross over. Aiden mentions something about wanting a brother. Guest star: Margaret Cho as Avery Grant
103	18	"Dead Eye"	John Behring	P.K. Simonds & Laurie McCarthy	April 9, 2010	6.55
A clown ghost comes to Mel (to her dismay, as she doesn't like clowns). He seems to think that he's not really a clown, and it proves to be true, as Melinda uncovers that he was actually a Private Investigator. When she sees him fixated on a redhead, she does some digging, and finds that the woman won the lottery and is a multi-millionaire, so she can't be the gold digger her boyfriend's daughter accused her of being. The PI was investigating her boyfriend to see if he was right for her, and her ex sold his car to hire the PI to look for her after she left, thinking she might be pregnant. Bedford's ghost comes to Melinda, saying he's still paying after giving up his own life as well as his mother's, and warns her to trust no-one and nothing.
104	19	"Lethal Combination"	Kim Moses	Stephanie SenGupta & Steve Gottfried	April 30, 2010	6.57
Jim hires a nanny so he and Mel can have a date night. After Aiden has an accident in her care, they hear about a string of similar incidents involving her, and warn their neighbor, who raves about her. Melinda goes to talk to one of her references, a man whose wife died of an 'illness', which turns out to have been alcoholism. The ghost of the wife comes to Mel, seeming to think she was killed by her husband and the nanny, who wanted her out of the way. Melinda has to uncover the truth behind the ghost's death before she kills her husband and the nanny.
105	20	"Blood Money"	Eric Laneuville	P.K. Simonds & Laurie McCarthy	May 7, 2010	6.46
Some college kids find an abandoned barn and feel a scary presence there. Only two get away, and they report their friend missing the next day. After a series of visions, Melinda investigates and leads the police to the body of a boy buried outside the barn, who turns out to have been kidnapped eleven years ago. He turns out to be the ghost, and he tries to help Mel when the detective she's working with turns out to be his killer, and is after ransom money he knows is buried somewhere in the barn. Carl the Watcher returns, stating that the shadows are greedy and gluttons for energy, and saying that the flip side of greed is fear.
106	21	"Dead Ringer"	Ian Sander	Mark B. Perry & Stephanie SenGupta	May 14, 2010	6.48
A girl comes into the shop to sell her recently deceased father's things, and when she talks about moving in with her boyfriend and a haunting happens, Melinda thinks her father is haunting her, not liking her boyfriend. Mel is having trouble telling her visions from reality, which is a huge problem. Melinda sees the ghost of the girl's boyfriend, but when she tells her he's dead, he walks into the store alive and well. Mel eventually deduces that he had a twin brother who died when they were eight, but thinks the ghost grew up with his brother. Carl tells Mel that because Aiden can see the shadows, which weakens them, they will target him, and that if she tells him ghosts aren't real, he may stop seeing them, which would be the best thing for him. Jim is all for the idea, but Melinda doesn't want to deny his gift. Guest star: Randolph Mantooth.
107	22	"The Children's Parade"	John Gray	John Gray	May 21, 2010	6.83
Melinda and Jim told Aiden ghosts aren't real, and neither are the shadows and shinies, but he didn't stop seeing them. Melinda can no longer tell the dead from the living. Eli has trouble talking because of a toothache, but when Carl asks him why Melinda is ignoring him, Eli manages to communicate that he told her Aiden shouldn't see ghosts, and he reveals that he must have been possessed by the shadows when he said that, because he would never normally say such a thing, since it is the worst time for Aiden not to use his gift. At the hospital, the ghost of a thirteen-year-old boy is leading the child ghosts of polio victims on marches to show that they're not afraid of the shadows. Melinda gets completely taken over by the shadows, and when Carl sees Aiden talking to someone he can't see, Aiden reveals that it's a shiny- or the crossed over ghost of a child. After the Book of Changes tells Carl and Eli how to stop the shadows, Aiden must convince the shinies to help. Mel and Aiden cross over the Polio Victims and the boy, and Mel and Jim tell Aiden they were wrong to try to get him to deny his gift.
