= Ghost Whisperer season 1 =

Ghost Whisperer
- Season 1
- DVD cover
- No. of episodes: 22

Release
- Original network: CBS
- Original release: September 23, 2005 – May 5, 2006

Season chronology
- Next → Season 2

The first season of Ghost Whisperer, an American television series created by John Gray, commenced airing in the United States on September 23, 2005, concluded May 5, 2006, and consisted of 22 episodes. The series follows the life of Melinda Gordon (Jennifer Love Hewitt), who has the ability to see and communicate with ghosts. While trying to live as normal a life as possible—she is married and owns an antique store—Melinda helps earthbound spirits resolve their problems and cross over into the "light," or the spirit world. Her tasks are difficult and at times she struggles with people who push her away and disbelieve her ability. In addition, the ghosts are mysterious and sometimes menacing in the beginning and Melinda must use the clues available to her to understand the spirit's needs and help them.

Ghost Whisperer's first season aired in the United States (U.S.) on Fridays at 8:00 PM ET on CBS, a broadcast television network, where it received an average of 10.20 million viewers per episode.

== Premise ==
Melinda Gordon is a young woman from the fictional town of Grandview, New York, who has the ability to see and communicate with the dead. Melinda lives with her husband Jim Clancy. She is the owner of an antique shop called "Same as it Never Was." Ghosts seek Melinda's help in relaying a message or completing a task that will put the spirit to rest, and allow them to cross over into The Light (which is possibly Heaven). Those who died with unfinished business become earth-bound and cannot cross over, and Melinda, as their earthly representative, helps them to find peace. The show does not present the ghosts as having sinned, rather it is the spirits' own guilt that condemns them, and their own fear of judgement that keeps them from "crossing over" into an afterlife.

=== Plot ===
In the first season is introduced Andrea Marino (Aisha Tyler), Melinda's best friend and coworker. Andrea knows of Melinda's gift, and often helps her figure out why a certain ghost is earthbound. Throughout the season, Melinda repeatedly catches glimpses of a ghost named Romano, a former cult leader from Europe who influenced his followers to commit a mass suicide in 1939. His own suicide transformed him into an earthbound negative entity. Romano attempts to do the exact opposite of Melinda and gather earthbound souls and prevent them from crossing over into the light. Contrary to what Melinda tells them about how their previously-departed loved ones are waiting for them in the light, Romano preys on their own fear of judgement, ramping up any notion they hold that they have "sinned."

At the end of the season, a plane crashes just outside Grandview. Melinda and Romano struggle over the 300 souls of people who die in the crash. Melinda convinces most of the ghosts to cross over, although Romano convinces a select few to come with him. Melinda suffers a huge personal loss when it is revealed that Andrea was killed when her car got caught in the path of the plane crash as she was driving to her brother's apartment.

== Development ==
Ghost Whisperer is based on the work of spirit communicator James Van Praagh, who is co-executive producer and regularly updates a blog about the show through LivingTV. The stories are also said to be based in part on the work of spirit communicator Mary Ann Winkowski. Development of the show dates back to at least two years before its premiere.

The show was produced by Sander/Moses Productions in association with CBS Television Studios (originally Paramount Network Television in season one and ABC Studios (originally Touchstone Television in the first two seasons) and CBS Paramount Network Television in seasons two and four).

The show was filmed on the Universal Studios back lot in Los Angeles. One area on the lot is Courthouse Square from the Back to the Future trilogy, though it has been drastically modified to depict Grandview. For example, the clock tower in Back to the Future has been completely covered up. Cast and crew members believe that the set gets visits from real spirits.

Sound effects were completed at Smart Post Sound. Visual effects for the pilot and some season one episodes were completed at Flash Film Works. Visual effects for nearly the entire series were created at Eden FX.

== Cast ==
- Jennifer Love Hewitt as Melinda Gordon (22 episodes)
- Aisha Tyler as Andrea Marino (22 episodes)
- David Conrad as Jim Clancy (22 episodes)

== Episodes ==
| No. overall | No. in season | Title | Directed by | Written by | Original release date | U.S. viewers (millions) |
|---|---|---|---|---|---|---|
| 1 | 1 | "Pilot" | John Gray | John Gray | September 23, 2005 | 11.25 |
Even on her Wedding Day, the spirit world will not leave Melinda Gordon at bay. After a presence looms during her first dance with new husband Jim Clancy, Melinda is even more frightened when the same spirit disturbs her at her new home. Jim's brother makes an appearance at the wedding, later making it known that he is dead. Knowing she must help the spirit to cross over into The Light, Melinda tries to find the man's family.
| 2 | 2 | "The Crossing" | Ron Lagomarsino | Catherine Butterfield | September 30, 2005 | 10.87 |
A young boy killed by a train comes to Melinda for help in crossing over. Meanwhile, as Jim's mother comes to visit the newlyweds, Melinda must keep what she does secret.
| 3 | 3 | "Ghost, Interrupted" | Ian Sander | Jed Seidel | October 7, 2005 | 11.07 |
A pair of identical twin sisters are caught between two worlds and Melinda Gordon is the only one that can help them. Melinda has a flashback of her grandmother's death.
| 4 | 4 | "Mended Hearts" | John Gray | John Gray | October 14, 2005 | 9.99 |
A man killed in a cycling accident a year ago is worried about what his former fiancée might do to herself now they are apart, and is also curious about the person who received his heart in a transplant. Melinda struggles to get them both to realize he needs to cross over. Andrea helps out with the tax bill and become’s co owner of the antique shop.
| 5 | 5 | "Lost Boys" | Peter O'Fallon | David Fallon | October 21, 2005 | 10.55 |
When Melinda and Andrea scour an old property for items to sell at an auction, Melinda learns it used to be an orphanage and encounters the ghosts of three boys and a dog who died in a fire there. After finding the fourth boy who was assumed dead, was alive, she brought him to the 3 boys to talk and the 3 boys crossed over. The dog follows Melinda home.
| 6 | 6 | "Homecoming" | James Frawley | Lois Johnson | October 28, 2005 | 11.73 |
Melinda gets tangled in the life of a family who has just witnessed the death of their adopted son. Melinda tries to help the boy cross over, but he has a temper.
| 7 | 7 | "Hope and Mercy" | Bill L. Norton | John Wirth | November 4, 2005 | 12.78 |
Melinda enters a hospital, a notorious place for spirits to lurk, encountering a woman who wants to know what caused her untimely death during an operation.
| 8 | 8 | "On the Wings of a Dove" | Peter O'Fallon | Catherine Butterfield | November 11, 2005 | 11.41 |
Jim begins to doubt his sanity when an evil spirit threatens to haunts him. In order to save Jim, Melinda must help the spirit cross over.
| 9 | 9 | "Voices" | Kevin Hooks | John Belluso | November 18, 2005 | 12.05 |
Melinda is called by the spirit of a deceased mother who has been trying to communicate with her child via white noise.
| 10 | 10 | "Ghost Bride" | Joanna Kerns | Jed Seidel | November 25, 2005 | 12.25 |
The ghost of a bride who died not long after writing her marriage vows wreaks havoc on her former husband's new fiancé.
| 11 | 11 | "Shadow Boxer" | Joanna Kerns | Emily Fox | December 9, 2005 | 11.19 |
Melinda Gordon is visited by the spirit of a mother who needs help in healing the relationship between her earth-bound son and his father. The son, once a promising boxer, refuses to forgive his father for pushing him too hard during his mother's final days.
| 12 | 12 | "Undead Comic" | Eric Laneuville | Doug Prochilo | December 16, 2005 | 10.89 |
A stand-up comedian commits suicide and finds he is unable to cross over. Melinda helps him discover why he jumped from a bridge. He seems to think it’s because his girlfriend was leaving him. His girlfriend reveals to Melinda she decided not to go on tour and that’s why he jumped. Melinda has visions of a laughing man and a shadow man in a top hat.
| 13 | 13 | "Friendly Neighborhood Ghost" | David Jones | Lois Johnson | January 6, 2006 | 11.31 |
When Melinda welcomes a new neighbor who has moved in across the street, she gets more than she bargained for.
| 14 | 14 | "Last Execution" | James Frawley | David Fallon | January 13, 2006 | 10.92 |
A hanged man is the centrepiece of a macabre art exhibition Andrea, Jim and Melinda attend, but it is only Melinda who feels the wrath of the man's spirit. Elsewhere, when Jim saves a woman's life in Grandview, she claims he injured her in his practice of CPR and wants to sue.
| 15 | 15 | "Melinda's First Ghost" | Peter Werner | Catherine Butterfield | January 27, 2006 | 11.62 |
Melinda is surprised when her first ghost reappears, forcing her to remember how strained her relationship with her mother became when she claimed she could see spirits just like her grandmother could. In order to help the ghost cross over, Melinda must face her mother after many years without contact.
| 16 | 16 | "Dead Man's Ridge" | James Frawley | John Gray | February 3, 2006 | 10.62 |
Andrea is haunted by the spirit of a man, who disappears almost as soon as he appears but manages to register his presence, starling Andrea. She soon discovers that he is one of her former colleagues who is in coma, and appears to her when he flatlines. The man requests the help of Melinda and Andrea to find his brother in the mountain who is injured after a fall, and to mend their relationship.
| 17 | 17 | "Demon Child" | Eric Laneuville | Jed Seidel | March 3, 2006 | 12.40 |
When ogling items at a house not far from Grandview, Melinda is alarmed by the spirit of an infuriated young boy who has been terrorizing his mother and baby sister. As Melinda pursues the spirit, Jim looks after the baby and ponders he and Melinda having a child of their own.
| 18 | 18 | "Miss Fortune" | James Chressanthis | Emily Fox | March 10, 2006 | 10.34 |
A traveling circus arrives in Grandview, bringing with it the bitter ghost of a magician who claims his jealous brother and former girlfriend, a fortune-teller, killed him.
| 19 | 19 | "Fury" | Peter Werner | Rama Stagner | March 31, 2006 | 10.22 |
The ghost of an African-American man returns to Grandview to haunt the prosecutor who failed to convict his white attacker almost thirty years ago. Melinda must help the ghost find justice, before his views are passed on to the next generation.
| 20 | 20 | "The Vanishing" | Ian Sander | Catherine Butterfield | April 7, 2006 | 10.05 |
After tripping in the woods whilst on the hunt for a spirit, Melinda is knocked unconscious. Melinda sustains a head injury and soon realizes she can't see ghosts anymore. When a young girl whose boyfriend has just died comes to her for help, Melinda struggles to deal with the possibility that she may have lost her abilities forever.
| 21 | 21 | "Free Fall" (Part 1) | John Gray | John Gray | April 28, 2006 | 10.00 |
Melinda's sense of dread deepens, as the spirit world remains quiet. Everywhere Melinda goes there's a chill in the air. Then, two spirits come to her, one a pilot, the other a flight attendant. Both are frosted over. As Melinda puts the pieces together, she realizes that a pilot-less plane is going to crash and it is headed straight for Grandview.
| 22 | 22 | "The One" (Part 2) | John Gray | John Gray | May 5, 2006 | 11.06 |
In the aftermath of the wreckage, Melinda is overwhelmed as the dead passengers of Trans Eastern Flight 395 realize she can see them. Melinda must do what she has always done, cross the spirits over – into The Light. But, she faces a dark and mysterious top-hatted man who is working against her, convincing these souls that there is no reason to ever leave Grandview, as well as questions from Federal Investigators who want to know how she knew the plane was going to crash. Andrea, panic-stricken about whether her brother was one of the passengers on the flight, sets out to his apartment in the city moments before the plane crashes.

== Reception ==
In 2015, Gavin Hetherington of SpoilerTV reviewed the two-part season finale as part of a Throwback Thursday special on the site on August 27. Gavin looked back at the season closer fondly, calling it "sensational." He also said that the show "knocked this one out of the park." It had such a high-stakes dilemma that soared the show to new heights, proving it could be exciting and emotional all at the same time. The actors delivered their best performances and the writing was just amazing. We have John Gray to thank for this wonderful show and for writing this wonderful episode."
