= List of Ghost Whisperer characters =

The following are fictional characters from the television drama Ghost Whisperer created by John Gray.

== Main characters ==
Character	Portrayed by	Seasons				
Character	Portrayed by	1	2	3	4	5
Melinda Gordon	Jennifer Love Hewitt	Main	Main	Main	Main	Main
Andrea Marino	Aisha Tyler	Main (Note: In season two, Aisha Tyler is credited as a main cast member in the first episode only.)	Main			
Jim Clancy / Sam Lucas	David Conrad	Main	Main	Main	Main	Main
Delia Banks	Camryn Manheim		Main (Note: In season two, Camryn Manheim is credited as a main cast member starting in the second episode.)	Main	Main	Main
Professor Rick Payne	Jay Mohr		Recurring	Main	Sp. Guest	
Ned Banks	Tyler Patrick Jones		Recurring			
Ned Banks	Christoph Sanders			Recurring	Main	Main
Professor Eli James	Jamie Kennedy				Main	Main

Cast Notes

=== Melinda Gordon ===
Melinda Gordon, played by Jennifer Love Hewitt, is the protagonist of Ghost Whisperer . Melinda has been able to see ghosts since she was a little girl. Specifically, she sees ghosts who are not able to pass to the other side due to tasks they need her help with. She helps them find peace and cross into the light. The gift has been passed on for many generations. She is married to Jim Clancy (David Conrad) and owns an antique store, located in the fictional town of Grandview. She has many enemies who dislike her abilities, including Gabriel Lawrence (Ignacio Serricchio) and Romano (John Walcutt).

=== Andrea Marino ===
Andrea Marino
- First appearance: "Pilot"; 1x01, September 23, 2005
- Last appearance: "Love Never Dies"; 2x01, September 29, 2006
- Created by: John Gray
- Portrayed by: Aisha Tyler

In-universe information
- Nickname: Andie, Squeaky
- Occupation: Lawyer; Co-owned antique store
- Family: Mitch Marino (brother); Maya Marino (sister-in-law); Unnamed nieces

Andrea Joyce Marino, played by Aisha Tyler, is Melinda's (Jennifer Love Hewitt) best friend and was part of the main cast during season one. Andrea once worked in New York City, as a lawyer, until she moved to Grandview. She set up an antique store, named The Same As It Never Was, that she owns along with Melinda.

Melinda even comes to trust Andrea enough to tell her about her gift of being able to communicate with earthbound spirits, or ghosts. Andrea becomes essential to the store and Melinda, because of the very fact she knows about Melinda's gift. Whenever Melinda has to run off and help a ghost, Andrea is left to keep the store. Andrea also helps Melinda with difficult crossovers removing some of the stress from Melinda's husband, Jim (David Conrad). In "The One", a plane crashes and Andrea notices Melinda is hiding something. She believes her brother Mitch died during the plane crash and Melinda is seeing his ghost.

At the end of season one, it was revealed it was Andrea who had died during the crash and not Mitch. While Andrea was not on the plane, she died because her car had been on the path on which the plane had crashed. Romano attempts to prevent Andrea from crossing over into the Light and get her to join him on the Dark Side. Melinda would not allow such a horrific occurrence to happen to her friend, so she sets out to stop Romano and warn Andrea. With the help of an occult professor at Rockland University, Rick Payne, Melinda is able to help Andrea find peace and cross over into the Light. Her death was foreshadowed in Season 1, Episode 15. Romano is seen sitting in a chair in the antique store. When he disappears, a faint sound of an airplane engine is heard.

Andrea is later mentioned in "Drowned Lives", "A Grave Matter", "Delia's First Ghost" and "The Prophet". Also, while having been successfully crossed over into the Light for over a year, two ghosts taunt Melinda by calling her Andrea during "Bad Blood".

In the season four episode, "Leap of Faith", when Jim swims to rescue Melinda and hits his head, he has flashbacks of his past as Jim, and Andrea can be seen briefly when remembering his wedding with Melinda. Andrea's date of death is in the book of changes backwards and was mentioned before a flashback of the plane crash which killed her.

=== Jim Clancy ===
Jim Clancy
- First appearance: "Pilot"; 1x01, September 23, 2005
- Last appearance: The Children's Parade; 5x22, May 21, 2010
- Created by: John Gray
- Portrayed by: David Conrad

In-universe information
- Alias: Sam Lucas introduced: "Threshold"; 4x7, November 14, 2008
- Occupation: Paramedic/Firefighter, Doctor
- Family: Faith Clancy (mother); Aiden Clancy (father; deceased); Daniel 'Dan' Clancy (brother; deceased)
- Spouse: Melinda Gordon (m. 2005) in Sam's body: Melinda Gordon (m. 2009)
- Children: Unnamed child (miscarriage, with Melinda); Aiden Lucas (son, with Melinda)

Jim Clancy, played by David Conrad is Melinda's (Jennifer Love Hewitt) husband. He is the only cast member other than Hewitt to appear in every episode.

Jim and Melinda get married and move in at the start of the first season. Jim was a paramedic and firefighter, and the two met when he rescued her from her apartment complex, which had a structural issue. Jim knew of Melinda's unique ability to communicate with ghosts at the start of the series; he helped her as much as he could, though Melinda's good friend, Andrea Marino, provided most of the aid until her death at the end of the first season. It was revealed in the pilot episode that Jim witnessed his older brother, Dan, die when they were young. After having seen Dan die and being unable to save him, Jim decides to become a paramedic. Dan attended Jim and Melinda's wedding as a ghost and conversed with Melinda during the reception.

After Melinda's near death experience during the season two finale, "The Gathering", Jim becomes worried about what else could happen to Melinda because of the ghosts. Jim also helps to try to find information about Melinda's father (Tom Gordon), who might or might not be dead, as well as try to find any information about Melinda's brother, Gabe. In "Haunted Hero", Jim and Melinda welcome a returning soldier from Iraq, Matt, back to Grandview. When Matt becomes paranoid due to being haunted by his dead comrades and post-traumatic stress disorder, Jim confronts Matt in the town square and talks Matt out of trying to kill himself. Jim delivered some of his convincing argument with Matt's gun pointed at him.

In "Weight of What Was", Gabriel returns to Grandview and Jim warns him away, though not before Gabriel reveals that he is Melinda's half-brother. Jim, Rick, and Delia go in search of Melinda, who is trapped in old Grandview, which is buried under present day Grandview. Tessa, the ghost of Melinda's maternal ancestor who was also a Ghost Whisperer, helps them find Melinda by communicating with Delia and Jim. Jim also begins thinking of moving out of Grandview to attend medical school. At first, Melinda does not like the idea, but she later agrees to it. In "Deadbeat Dads", Jim admits he would like to have children someday; Jim and Melinda try to get pregnant and succeed, but Melinda loses the baby.

Near the end of "Imaginary Friends and Enemies" (early season 4), Jim is shot in the shoulder and rushed to the hospital, where he is immediately taken into surgery. Relieved to hear his surgery went well, Melinda is taken to his room and asks if she may stay with him until he awakens. It is implied she waits several hours, and she eventually falls asleep next to him. She wakes up to find Jim next to her, and believing him to be awake, she tells him she loves him. When Jim tells her softly he suffered an embolism, Melinda tries to get a doctor but Jim tells her not to and says that he wants her to remember him as he is now. This causes Melinda to realize Jim is appearing to her as a ghost; his body then flatlines in the background. As doctors rush in to revive him, Melinda tearfully pleads with Jim for it not be him. Jim then says, "I will always love you, Melinda", and then his ghost disappears as Melinda sobs and the doctors are unable to revive him. His death was foreshadowed in the season premiere, when a ghost warned Melinda death might rub off on those she loves.

In the next episode ("Threshold"), Jim refuses to cross over because he still loves Melinda and believes their love is what is holding him back. Even though Melinda wants Jim to stay, she knows it's selfish of her and begs him to go into the light, promising she'll be there one day. But when Jim and Melinda witness paramedics trying to revive a motorcycle accident victim named Sam Lucas (Kenneth Mitchell), they see the ghost of the victim go into the light. Jim goes over to the body and tells Melinda it's the only way. Before Melinda can stop him, Jim's ghost enters Sam's body, thus bringing him back to "life." However, the viewers continue to see him as Jim while everyone else in the show including Melinda sees him as Sam. When Melinda says "You're back", Jim, who now believes he is Sam and has no memory as Jim, says "Do I know you?" This leads Melinda to try to prove to him who he really is, especially when pieces of Jim's memory start to show. At first, he thinks she's crazy and doesn't believe her. When Melinda is trapped underground, Jim goes to save her, but he starts to drown and he has flashes of memories as Jim, thus bringing Jim fully back. When he finds Melinda, she calls him Sam to which Jim replies "Why are you calling me Sam?" Melinda then realizes Jim is back and she happily hugs him.

Later on, Melinda finds out she is pregnant again and it turns out Jim had gotten her pregnant shortly before he died. Later Melinda begins to worry about their unborn baby. She began to have nightmares and visions the baby was in danger. She was sure by the things she was being told the baby was a girl after Melinda runs into the faceless child again, who puts her hand on Melinda's tummy and says, "You can't save her. You can't." Jim reveals to Melinda he had seen her chart accidentally and knew it was a boy, although he knew they agreed not to find out, but he told her to ease her mind, so she’d see her visions and dreams were wrong. Jim and Melinda marry again at the same place they met - in front of witnesses, Eli James (best man) and Delia Banks (matron of honor), and a full gathering of spirits.

In Season 5, Melinda believes her due date is the exact date in the book, which causes doubts in Jim, Delia, Ned, and Eli. Melinda finally needs an emergency C-Section. When the baby suddenly goes into fetal distress in the operating room, the season’s first ghosts appear to Melinda. First the watcher, who warned Melinda of her child’s power and the danger he may come into, stops time to tell her Fate and Free Will will work together to decide whether or not the baby will live. The second ghost comes in the form of a young woman in a white gown. She quickly disappears and time restarts. While the baby isn’t breathing at first, he suddenly recovers to full health. Later in recovery, Melinda tells Jim they’ll name the baby Aiden Lucas, in honor of Jim’s father and Sam Lucas.

The series then jumps ahead to 2014 and the celebration of Aiden's upcoming fifth birthday. Jim is now a resident at Rockland Memorial Teaching Hospital, as Sam, and he takes the name Jim as his middle name. Ned is also in college, taking classes with Eli, while Delia has become a big realtor. There were always problems every year on Aiden's birthday. He would become strangely sick, for example. Every year a woman would visit Aiden and sing him happy birthday. The woman, Amber, had died in childbirth the night Melinda gave birth to Aiden. Amber was convinced her son’s spirit had jumped into Aiden, as he had stopped breathing shortly after he was born. Later on in the episode, it is revealed the son was actually adopted by the birth father and his wife.

Melinda helps Amber into the light and learns from the watcher that Aiden is an empath. He feels and takes on emotions of those around him. This is revealed as the reason why each year Amber would show up and he gets sick. Melinda also finds out she shares a psychic link with Aiden, which allows them to communicate with one another, though he doesn’t fully understand it. Melinda and Jim decide to not tell Aiden, because they want him to have a normal life, with his own dreams. In 5.19 "Lethal Combination", Jim is caught by Dr. Mavis, a morgue coroner, snooping through the files in the hospital morgue.

=== Delia Banks ===
Delia Banks
- First appearance: "Love Still Won't Die"; 2x02, September 29, 2006
- Last appearance: "The Children's Parade"; 5x22, May 21, 2010
- Portrayed by: Camryn Manheim

In-universe information
- Gender: Female
- Spouse: Charlie Banks (deceased)
- Children: Ned Banks

Delia Banks (portrayed by Camryn Manheim) joined the main cast of Ghost Whisperer at the start of season 2. She and her teenage son, Ned, lost their husband and father, Charlie, three years prior to their appearance on the show. Delia became a real estate agent after Charlie's death.

Delia meets Melinda Gordon after Melinda calls Delia about Ned's having tried to shoplift from Melinda's antique store. Delia tells Melinda about how stressful her job as a real estate agent is, so Melinda offers her a job to help work at the antique store, which Delia accepts. They begin a friendship, though Delia does not know about Melinda's gift at first. In the episode "Delia's First Ghost", Melinda has to tell Delia about her gift because Charlie's spirit is haunting her. At first Delia calls Melinda crazy, admitting she had seen Melinda talking to herself and was worried. Delia even goes as far as to tell Melinda not to expect her at work again. By the end of the episode Delia learns, with Melinda's help, Charlie is only haunting her because he wants her to be safe. While still a little skeptical of Melinda's gift, Delia tells her that she will open the shop the next morning.

Delia remains skeptical concerning Melinda's gift in season three, but discusses the various ghosts Melinda encounters to help Melinda with them. When Melinda was stalked by a lawyer, Shane, he tampered with Ned's records because Delia was trying to get him into private school. Nevertheless, when Shane was caught with Ned's records, Ned got in. In episode 5, "Weight of What Was", Delia travels along with Jim and Rick into a series of tunnels and alleyways from a much older Grandview to find Melinda. With the help of a ghost named Tessa, they manage to locate her and get her to safety. In "Bad Blood", Delia's need to find a rational explanation for every situation, including ones involving ghosts, is brought up. Delia tells Melinda that she will try harder to accept the notion of ghosts. In the episode "Heart and Soul", Delia's need for a rational explanation nearly destroys her relationship with Melinda, but a conversation with her son and a moment with "Sam" at a basketball court provides her with faith in Melinda's gift. She now believes Jim is living in Sam's body. Sometime within the five-year leap between seasons 4 and 5 she left working for Melinda to open a Real Estate agency next to the shop, however she is frequently seen helping Melinda in the shop at various points in the series and remains Melinda's best friend.

=== Ned Banks ===
Ned Banks
- First appearance: "Love Still Won't Die"; 2x02, September 29, 2006 (recurring cast) "Firestarter"; 4x01, October 3, 2008 (main cast)
- Last appearance: The Children's Parade; 5x22, May 21, 2010
- Portrayed by: Tyler Patrick Jones (Season 2); Christoph Sanders (Seasons 3-5)

In-universe information
- Gender: Male
- Occupation: Student

Ned Banks was originally portrayed by Tyler Patrick Jones, but starting with season 3 episode "Slambook!" Christoph Sanders took over the role. Ned is a nice guy who has dedicated his life to helping Melinda with the occult. He is the son of Delia and Charlie Banks. The events of his adolescence have been part of the plots of some episodes.

Ned was caught shoplifting at Melinda's antique shop, stealing Grateful Dead backstage passes. Melinda realized his behavior was the result of a spirit's urging. Ned found out Melinda's secret before his mother did when he overheard Melinda in the episode "Curse of the Ninth." He is always eager to help Melinda with her ghosts. A few episodes later, when his deceased father Charlie visits him and his mother, Melinda helps his father go into the Light. In the season three episode "No Safe Place," Ned gets into a private school.

In "Slambook," Ned (played by Christoph Sanders from then on) is on the basketball team when a ghost begins tampering with the scoreboard. In the episode "Home But Not Alone," Ned has his first girlfriend and (probably) his first kiss. In season 4, there was a plot which involved his mother suspecting him of smoking marijuana, but as it turned out, it was his mother's friend's joint. As of season five, he is a student at Rockland University. In "Dead Air" he is a host of a radio show, and has cheated on his girlfriend TJ (which he later regrets and apologizes for).

In season 5, Ned is studying Anthropology of the Occult at Rockland University. He uses his knowledge to help Melinda and Eli solve the mystery of the Shadows and Shinies, also aiding them in crossing over spirits. Ned, Melinda, and Eli take turns keeping the Book of Changes.

=== Rick Payne ===
Richard "Rick" Payne
- First appearance: "Love Never Dies"; 2x01, September 22, 2006 (recurring cast) "The Underneath"; 3x01, September 28, 2007 (main cast)
- Last appearance: "Firestarter"; 4x01, October 3, 2008
- Portrayed by: Jay Mohr

In-universe information
- Nickname: Rick, Ricky, Payne
- Gender: Male
- Occupation: Professor at Rockland University
- Spouse: Kate Payne (wife; deceased)

Rick Payne (portrayed by Jay Mohr) is a professor at Rockland University. He is a widower; his wife, Kate, died in a crane accident before his first appearance in the series.

At the beginning of season two, Melinda Gordon first seeks Rick Payne's help to save her deceased friend, Andrea Marino, who is being attacked by a dark spirit, Romano. She finds him teaching an occult class at Rockland University. She continues to seek Rick's help for various paranormal occurrences throughout the rest of the season. Rick first meets Melinda's husband, Jim Clancy, when Melinda recommends Jim talk to him about a ghost. It is in "The Night We Met" that Rick first questions Melinda about whether or not she believes she has supernatural abilities, as well as meets Melinda's close friend and co-worker, Delia Banks. It is only in the episode "Cat's Claw" that Melinda finally informs Rick of her abilities. In the season finale, Rick and Melinda are seen working very closely trying to figure out who Gabriel Lawrence, a dark Ghost Whisperer, really is. Rick, Jim, and Melinda go as far as breaking into Gabriel's home. It is also revealed Rick's wife, Kate, is a ghost who worked for the dark side but would later cross over into the Light after telling her husband a secret she had been keeping from him since she died.

The character joins the main cast in season three. At the beginning of this season, Rick appears to be worried about Melinda after her near-death experience. He also works a large deal more with Melinda on some things. In "The Weight of What Was", Rick, Jim, and Delia all travel into old Grandview to try finding Melinda. Jim and Delia are aided by a ghost named Tessa, an ancestor of Melinda's, and locate the trapped Melinda. Rick also helps Melinda search town death records for information about Tessa, who at the time Melinda believed to be Gabriel's mother, though a group of ghosts attempt to stop them from finding anything. In "Double Exposure", Rick's date and co-worker, Claudia, is haunted by a ghost who makes it so she cannot appear in any pictures.

Abrasive at times, Professor Rick Payne is often perceived as obnoxious on first impression, but most of the time he means well. Sarcastic and sometimes insensitive, he has a tendency to shout randomly and hates to be awakened by late night telephone calls. Even though he does not appreciate the title, he is rather well known as a genius, and spouts useless information at times. He has admitted that he talks a lot when he is nervous, but he talks a lot whether he is nervous or not. Professor Payne is quick-witted and highly intelligent, taking delight in annoying people and considers the reactions he gets from being rude amusing. He feels that he is taken for granted too often and likes to tell people so, though some believe it is only a technique to make others feel sorry for him. He has a certain charm, despite his ability to annoy even those with saintly amounts of patience, and he is a good friend to those who can stand to stick with him.

=== Eli James ===
Eli James
- First appearance: "Firestarter"; 4x01, October 3, 2008
- Last appearance: "The Children's Parade"; 5x22, May 21, 2010
- Portrayed by: Jamie Kennedy

In-universe information
- Gender: Male
- Occupation: Professor at Rockland University, therapist
- Family: Ray James (father; deceased); Evelyn James (mother; deceased); Zoe Ramos (girlfriend; deceased)

Dr. Eli James (Jamie Kennedy) was introduced in the first episode of season four. He was a psychology professor at Rockland University.

During a building fire on the Rockland University campus on October 3, 2008, he died but was brought back, causing him to have a near death experience. It unlocked an ability which allows him to hear ghosts, but doesn't allow him to see them like Melinda. Throughout the fourth season, he adjusts to his newfound ability and starts helping her cross ghosts over. Eli also helps Melinda when she needs information from the Police.

Zoe, previous Guardian of the Book of Changes and Eli's ex-girlfriend, died after falling off the stairs in an attempt to stop a thief influenced by a Watcher. At the end of Season 4, Zoe crossed into the light (or so it seems) after telling Eli he was the next Guardian of the Book of Changes. In Season 5, it is revealed Eli is one of Ned's university lecturers. Evelyn, Eli's mother, died 7 years ago, even though in "Stage Fright" he told Melinda and Jim he was getting an autograph for his mom who watches the show which was visiting Grandview. Eli's father, Ray James, died from a heart-attack in the third episode of Season 5, "Till Death Do Us Start," which shared more shocking secrets about Eli's parents.

Eli and Melinda over time become very close friends. At first, Eli thought that Melinda was crazy (as almost everyone always does when she shares about her gift) until he realized he could do the same thing (almost). As he learns more about his gift, he becomes more and more willing to help Melinda with the hauntings and even enjoys it.

== Supporting characters ==
=== Beth Gordon ===
Beth Gordon (portrayed by Anne Archer), Melinda's mother and Aiden's grandmother, has the ability to communicate with ghosts, but chooses not to. She never came to terms with her mother or Melinda when it came to their gifts and prefers not to speak of anything that has to do with ghosts, or her husband Tom Gordon. Before she met Tom, she was in a relationship with a man named Paul Eastman, whom she was having a baby with when he went to jail. Once he died, Beth married Tom and never told Melinda about her real father. In "Pater Familias", Paul convinces Beth to tell Melinda the truth. She is then invited to watch the tall ships come into the harbor with Melinda, Jim and their friends, Rick, Delia, and Ned. She appeared in the episodes "Melinda's First Ghost", "The Vanishing", "The Underneath", and "Pater Familias".

=== Mary Ann Patterson ===
Mary Ann Patterson, (played by June Squibb) - Melinda's grandmother and Aiden's great grandmother, now deceased, was a person who spoke to ghosts. It was she who gave lost spirits the title "earthbound." She helped them cross over into the Light (Heaven). Her gift was passed down to Melinda, the current "ghost whisperer." Mary Ann crossed over into the Light so she is currently a "Light" Spirit. She helps Melinda bring ghosts to peace through dreams in two episodes: "Voices" and "The Gathering". It is later revealed, in Season 3, that Melinda's maternal great-great-great-grandmother, Tessa (Amy Acker), could also communicate with ghosts and Melinda helps her cross over. When Melinda tells Tessa the fate of her daughter (in "Weight of What Was"), it is revealed that Mary Anne was the granddaughter of Julie Lee Lucas. Her married name was Patterson, according to Melinda. Melinda was in high school when her grandmother died and Melinda did not realize it until her grandmother said something about presence and then it dawned on Melinda that her grandmother was talking about her death and Melinda's loss of her grandmother.

=== Romano ===
Romano (John Walcutt), also known as "Wide Brim" (due to his outfit: black suit and black hat) was an American evil cult leader who lived in Spain, and who committed suicide along with 100 followers in 1939. The energy of the mass suicide made him powerful and strong, and he went to the Dark Side. He can be considered Melinda's true archenemy. He started to trick souls to go with him, by making them refuse to "cross over" into The Light.

When Romano first appeared on the show, his appearances were quick and mysterious, and he was usually attached to a laughing man who had, theretofore, never spoken. He always seemed to be observing Melinda. When in the episode "The One", the final episode of season one, a plane crashes outside Grandview, he attempts to gather all of the lost souls from the accident. This is the first time he declares his hatred and rivalry to Melinda, and he says he would release all "his earthbound souls" in exchange for her one soul.

Romano and Melinda confront each other verbally, each using persuasive speeches directed to the souls from the plane crash. Finally, Romano manages to get at least seven of the souls, including a stewardess who later does go into the Light in season two.

In "Love Never Dies", season two episode one, Romano tries to prevent Melinda's friend Andrea from crossing over into The Light. Melinda gathers all her strength to make Andrea cross over, and she learns with the help of Professor Rick Payne the identity of Romano. Payne also warns Melinda about Romano's real purpose: to destroy good spirits (the ones in charge of helping souls to "cross over" into The Light, such as Melinda) in order to make the dead stronger than the living, and to be endlessly powerful. According to Payne, Dark Spirit Romano would literally take over a weak soul in a weak body to make too much harm to humanity, until the last trace of joy and happiness vanished from earth. It is impossible for Romano to get closer when Melinda helps spirits to "cross over" into The Light, because there is too much love, and love is what Romano hates.

Romano last appeared in season two, episode one, when he was unsuccessful in trying to possess Andrea's soul. However, mid-season two, Melinda seems to foreshadow Romano's comeback, when Delia Banks tries on a black hat which resembles Romano's, although nothing arises from this. Melinda loosely references Romano in an episode of season five; when discussing the Shadows, she mentions that she's seen similar ghosts before, ones which didn't "cross over, so much as "cross under" much like Romano does with his followers. This reference could tell viewers that Romano ultimately became a Shadow after Andrea crossed over, and this is why he does not appear to Melinda for the rest of the series.

=== Charlie Banks ===
Delia was married to Charlie Banks (Fredric Lehne) until he died three years prior to Delia's first appearance on the show. They had a loving relationship. After a fire at the place where Charlie worked, Charlie was said to be different and more of a family man. We also learn that it was Tim who saved Charlie's life. Together with Charlie, Delia had her twelve-year-old son, Ned. Charlie died after being shot.

=== Tim Flaherty ===
In the episode "The Walk-In", Tim Flaherty (Thomas Wilson), a friend and co-worker of Jim's, is trying to get Delia to go out on a date with him, something Delia refuses to do. In "Delia's First Ghost", Tim tries to get Jim to tell him what Delia likes so he can impress her. Charlie, Delia's dead husband, helps him by knocking over a pot of lavender roses Delia likes. Tim also buys a motorcycle exactly like the one Charlie used to have. At the end of the episode, they are seen walking away hand in hand. He reappears in the fourth season in the episode Threshold. He is at Jim's funeral and talks about Jim before turning on an iPod with rock music which he says Jim would have wanted.

=== Gabriel Lawrence ===
Gabriel Lawrence (Ignacio Serricchio) claims to be Melinda's half-brother. He is also a "ghost whisperer". It is unclear from whom he inherited this gift, since neither of his parents displays it. When he was a child, Gabriel realised he could interact with the dead but nobody believed him, and he received psychiatric treatment in a mental health institution. Gabriel never had a living friend. In fact, all of his friends were dead, and he always hated watching them "cross over" into The Light. He managed to get out of the mental health institution by lying. He was in the same mental health institution where his mother resided.

In "The Collector" episode, Gabriel is now in his late twenties, and he has recently moved to Grandview. He mentions Grandview always brings him memories. Melinda Gordon has the opportunity to meet him, and she is amazed by the gift they have in common. Melinda warns Gabriel about a shift in the "other world": ghosts are becoming stronger. She tells him how she struggled against a very dark spirit called Romano the year before, when a plane crashed in Grandview.

However, Melinda discovers she was naive to believe in Gabriel, who had invited her to work with him in the difficult task of dealing with ghosts. Gabriel turns out to be a Ghost Whisperer from the Dark Side, and he had been gathering souls to prepare for what "was coming", a complex prophecy of the death of a "loved one".

Gabriel, along with the dark spirits, was blocking The Light, because he was trying to make the dead stronger than the living. When Melinda, Jim Clancy, and Rick Payne break into Gabriel's house, they find out Gabriel's obsession with Melinda. He had been observing her moves for quite a long time. At the end of season two, both Gabriel and Melinda struggle against each other for the fate of living and dead.

Gabriel returns to Grandview in the third season episode "Weight of What Was", informing Melinda he is her half-brother. He hands her a package containing images of her father's family. An image in the package, in fact from Melinda's mother's past, leads Melinda to an underground church and her great-great-great grandmother, Tessa. A ghost which haunts the archives of Grandview tells Gabriel that Melinda has entered the tunnel, and Gabriel blocks the exit, preventing Melinda from escaping the way she entered. The episode ends with Gabriel speaking to Tom Gordon about what seems like a plan to get Melinda to help ghosts in a dark way. While in Grandview, he resided in a hotel under the name Gabriel Gordon. Gabriel also appears in "All Ghosts Lead to Grandview", wherein he has a brief conversation with Melinda at the end of the episode.

=== Thomas Gordon ===
Thomas "Tom" Gordon (Martin Donovan) first appears in the plot in season two's finale, although he has previously appeared in some flashbacks. When Melinda "dies" in season two's finale, she confronts what appears to be an already dead Tom, who tells her she is ready to find the darkness within herself, and also tells her she has a brother, later revealed to be Gabriel. In season three, Tom has contact with both Melinda and Gabriel, manifesting himself in Melinda's dreams, and speaking as a ghost with Gabriel. It has been suggested Tom is part of the Dark Side, and he is developing a plan to get Melinda into the Dark Side.

In the penultimate episode of season three, however, Tom is found alive in Gabriel's home. Melinda later learns every time she had seen Tom's "ghost", his body had in fact been taken over by Paul Eastman, when he was trying to kill Tom. Melinda then finds out Tom actually is not her father, Paul Eastman is. After discovering this shocking truth, Melinda goes to the main square in town to think, where Tom meets her. He asks her to come back to the house she grew up in. There he gets her to go back through her memories to the night Paul Eastman had come to their house. Just then Melinda realizes Tom is actually a cold-blooded killer; she remembers Tom deliberately murdering Paul Eastman. Tom then informs her that he now has to kill her to keep his secret safe. As he tries to choke her to death, Melinda cries out to her dad, to which Tom answers, "I'm not your Dad". Melinda replies she wasn't talking to Tom but actually was asking for help from her real father. Paul Eastman then arrives and takes over Tom's body one last time, forcing him to throw himself over the staircase, effectively killing him. Soon afterwards he appears before Melinda. Tom is then pulled away by an unknown force to an unknown location.

=== Paul Eastman ===
Paul Eastman (Corin Nemec) first appears in Melinda's dreams as someone who haunted her and/or wanted to haunt her. She soon discovers that he was an escaped prisoner accused of killing a child whose ghost Melinda was attempting to cross over. However, before he crosses over, the boy admits that his death was an accident, and that he had spoken to Eastman as a ghost to lead him to his body. This led to his wrongful incarceration. In the season 3 finale, it is revealed he is Melinda's biological father, not Tom Gordon. Paul set a series of "clues" to help Melinda see the truth. To quicken the process and save Melinda, he convinces her mother to tell Melinda the truth. Melinda is initially in disbelief and consoled by Tom, who convinces her to follow him to a safe place. The "safe" place is Melinda's childhood home and Paul Eastman's burial site. Once they arrive, Tom probes Melinda about her memory of Paul's death; she eventually has a flashback revealing Tom deliberately killed Paul. Tom decided he must kill Melinda to protect himself from the truth being revealed. Melinda cries out to her father, to which Tom replies: "Don't call me Dad. I'm not your Father." Melinda answers, "I wasn't talking to you." As Tom realizes to whom Melinda had been calling, Paul enters Tom's body and forces him to fall to his death. Paul talks to Melinda and her mother and says he thought that he would never be so angry with his former lover, and only hearing his daughter calling for her father made all of his anger disappear. He then went into The Light. He has one grandson by Melinda, Aiden. In life, he apparently had the ability to speak to ghosts just like Melinda and her maternal relations, meaning that Melinda received her ability from both parents.

=== Zoe Ramos ===
Zoe Ramos (Jaclyn DeSantis) is Eli's ex-girlfriend and a professor at Rockland University. She knows a lot about the supernatural, because she teaches a course entitled the "Science of the Occult." Zoe and Eli had broken up because at the time he didn't share her beliefs regarding ghosts, life after death, etc. At the end of the fourth season, Eli decides to resume contact with her. Zoe helps Melinda and Eli with cases involving voodoo and vampirism (episodes "Cursed" and "Endless Love").

In season four's finale, Eli observes Zoe having lunch with a lawyer, Jeremy Bishop, and becomes very jealous. When Eli attempts the theft of an ancient book from the library of the University, Zoe tells him the true value of the book, which she has studied. Eli decides to invite Zoe out for dinner. When she fails to appear, Eli goes to Zoe's house and finds her dead. Her spirit tells Eli she died from falling down the stairs while a thief, influenced by a Watcher, entered her house to put the Book there.

After securing the Book, Eli calls to Zoe, who informs him about the Other Side. She tells him that she was the "Guardian of the Book of Changes" and, henceforth, he will need to take care of the Book. Eli agrees and realizes he still loves Zoe. After saying goodbye to Eli, Zoe goes into the light.

=== Aiden Lucas ===
Aiden Lucas (portrayed by Connor Gibbs) is the son of Melinda Gordon and Jim Clancy. Aiden is also the grandson of Paul Eastman and Beth Gordon who are Melinda's parents and Aiden and Faith Clancy who are Jim's parents.

Aiden was born on September 25, 2009. Before his birth, the watchers predict him and tell Melinda that her son is the key if the ghost's balances shift, and he will be more powerful than she is. On the day of his birth, Melinda worries about her son's fate. During his birth, Melinda needs an emergency C-section and Aiden suddenly goes into fetal distress in the operating room. First, the watcher (Carl) warned Melinda of her child’s power and the danger he may come into, stops time to tell her Fate and Free Will will work together to decide whether or not the baby will live. He quickly disappears and time restarts. While the baby is not breathing at first, he suddenly recovers to full health. Later in recovery, Melinda tells Jim they will name the baby Aiden Lucas, after Jim’s father and the late Sam Lucas.

Years later, the family is celebrating Aiden's upcoming fifth birthday. Every year on his birthday something bad happens; Aiden strangely gets sick or something happens to Melinda or Jim. Delia and Melinda call it a birthday curse. However, Aiden is actually haunted by the ghost of the woman who died during childbirth when Melinda gave birth to Aiden. The woman believes Aiden is the spirit of her dead son and she haunts Aiden every year on his birthday.

Melinda discovers this and finds out the ghost's son, Tyler, is actually alive and safe with his real father and adoptive mother. Aiden saved Tyler earlier in a bowling accident and Melinda helped the woman go into the light. Later, Carl reveals to Melinda that Aiden is an empath and can feel other people's emotions; he would get sick on his birthday and something went wrong with his birth because of the ghost.

In addition to being an empath, Aiden is able to see and communicate with ghosts like his mother and grandparents do, and he is psychically connected to Melinda. Melinda does not tell Aiden this because she wants him to have a normal life.

Aiden is able to see things Melinda can't, namely the Shinies (which Aiden refers to as "faceless" and made of "light") and the Shadows, which can be defeated easily by the Shinies, but the Shinies are too afraid of them to do so.

== Spirits ==
Characters that appear as spirit guest stars:

Season	Ep	Name(Actor)	Death Cause	Status	Notes
Pre-deceased		Mary Ann (June Squibb)	Natural Causes	Crossed over	Melinda's grandmother, seen in several episodes. (flashback)
Pre-deceased		Romano (John Walcutt)	Mass-suicide through cyanide-laced punch	Lost spirit/Shadow	Dead pre-Ghost Whisperer. American expatriate in Spain.
Web episode		Zach (Mark Hapka)	Crashes his bike and hits his head on a piece of debris	Crossed over	Crossed over in season 3 episode 16.
Season 1	1	Paul Adams (Wentworth Miller)	Died when his helicopter crashed into a waterfall	Crossed over	Died during the Vietnam War in 1970's
Season 1	2	Kenny Dale (Joseph Castanon)	Train crashed into a car	Shiny	Was a little boy that didn't understand he was dead.
Season 1	3	Zoe Harper (Jessica Collins)	Drowned in a lake	Crossed over	Zoe stayed to watch over her sister.
Season 1	4	Conor Donovan (Sean Maher)	Crashes his bike and hits his head on a rock	Crossed over	Conor stayed to watch over his girlfriend
Season 1	5	Rat (Lorenzo James Henrie); Vic (Max Jansen Weinstein); Marty (Terrence Hardy Jr.); Homer (Ghost Dog)	All burned to death in a fire	Shiny; Shiny; Shiny; Did not cross over	Rat doesn't want to cross over because he blames himself for the deaths of the other boys. Vic and Marty follow Rat. Homer stays with Melinda and Jim as their pet ghost-dog. Seen in several episodes, last seen in Season 2.
Season 1	6	Jason Shields (John Patrick Amedori)	Anaphylaxis due to multiple hornet stings	Crossed over	Jason wanted to meet his biological mom.
Season 1	7	Hope Paulson (Erica Leerhsen); Margaret Devine (Jenny O'Hara); Numerous Ghosts in Hospital	Complications from an ectopic pregnancy Unknown; Unknown	Crossed over Crossed over Did not cross over	
Season 1	8	Julian Borgia (Robert LaSardo); Robert Hall (G-Man); Alexis' Aunt Ruth	Vehicular homicide Shot and killed by police Natural causes	Crossed over Lost spirit Crossed over	First case of a spirit communicating through Melinda's husband Died 1963; Reappeared to let Melinda know an emerald necklace was buried with her.
Season 1	9	Lacy Jensen (Colleen Flynn)	Electrocuted when she fell down a pit	Crossed over	Lacy didn't cross over because she was worried about her son.
Season 1	10	Serena Hilliard (Laura Regan); Josh/Best man (David Lipper)	Car went off the road and crashed into tree	Crossed over Crossed over	
Season 1	11	Estella de La Costa (Sonia Braga)	Inoperable brain tumor	Crossed over	
Season 1	12	Marty Golden (Jed Rees); Numerous Ghosts	Suicide through jumping off a bridge Numerous deaths	Crossed over Stayed at the Comedy Cave.	
Season 1	13	Lyle Chase (Jonathan Banks)	Heart attack	Crossed over	He was searching for his granddaughter's killer.
Season 1	14	Clete Youngblood (Liam Waite)	Execution by hanging	Crossed over	
Season 1	15	Sarah Applewhite (Abigail Breslin)	Glioma (cancer of the brain's glia cells)	Shiny	Melinda's classmate and first ghost she saw.
Season 1	16	Dennis McMartin (Matt Keeslar); Dr. Bob Norris (Josh Daugherty); Dennis' and Charlie's Father (Michael Fairman)	Fell off a mountain; died in the hospital Unknown; Heart attack	Crossed over Crossed over Crossed over	Andrea's friend Died two years before; was haunting the hospital.
Season 1	17	Daniel Greene (David Dorfman); Reggie Zuko (Scott Rinker)	Car crash after car was hit and slammed into guard rail Brain tumor	Shiny; Lost spirit	Appeared in several episodes and seen at the end of Season 2.
Season 1	18	Edward Pierce (Jonathan Firth); Ventriloquist and the Dummy (Blair Hickey)	Drowned during Circus act in circus pool Car accident after car went off road and crashed into tree	Crossed over Lost spirit	
Season 1	19	Ely Fisher (Giancarlo Esposito); Rachel Fisher (Femi Emiola) "Rain Check" Nurse (Sarah Hunley)	Bludgeoned to death with a lead pipe Heart attack Unknown	Crossed over Crossed over Uncertain but most likely crossed over.	
Season 1	20	Brian Fordyce (Chris Olivero)	Heart attack	Crossed over	
Season 1	21; 22	Ken Nilson/Pilot (Chris Ellis); Almost all people killed in airplane crash At least three people in airplane crash, among them being Amy Fields (Rachel Cannon)	All died in plane crash due to pilot error	Crossed over Crossed over Lost spirit	
Season 2	1	Andrea Marino (Aisha Tyler)	Plane landed on her car and crushed her to death	Crossed over	Killed in Season 1 Episode 21, co-owner of Melinda's antique shop.
Season 2	2	Jamie Barton (Greg Cipes); Kyle McCall/Mac (Michael Landes)	Unknown; Hit by a car	Crossed over Crossed over	Was attached to Ned Banks; Melinda's former boyfriend.
Season 2	3	Emily Morrison (Tatum McCann)	Fell into pool and drowned while reaching for a beach ball	Shiny	
Season 2	4	Dennis Hightower (Kevin Weisman)	Carbon monoxide poisoning	Crossed over	
Season 2	5	Adam Godfrey (David Paymer); Marilyn Mandeville (Harriet Sansom Harris)	Struck by lightning Heart attack	Crossed over Crossed over	
Season 2	6	Eva Kaminsky (Amanda Tosch)	Sevoflurane (anaesthetic) poisoning	Crossed over	
Season 2	7	Anna Fowler (Bess Wohl)	Hypothermia	Crossed over	
Season 2	8	Warren Chen (Tim Kang); Woman the night Melinda met Jim; Ghost in funeral home	Burned to death in arson crime Died in building fire Unknown	Crossed over Crossed over Did not cross over	
Season 2	9	Patrick Roth (Norbert Weisser); Jared (John Paul Pitoc)	Natural causes Plane crash due to pilot error	Crossed over Lost spirit	
Season 2	10	Matt Vonner (Christopher Wiehl)	Car crash due to car spinning and crashing into a light pole	Crossed over	
Season 2	11	Dr. Martin Schaer (Reed Diamond)	Dengue fever from mosquito bite	Crossed over	
Season 2	12	Hugh Bristow (Brad Rowe)	Taken off life support due to Lou Gehrig's disease	Crossed over	
Season 2	13	Eric Sanborn / John Richmond / Oscar Hodges / Richard Ward (David Clayton Rogers)	Aortic aneurysm	Crossed over	Was a spirit that died 4 times after being reincarnated. Melinda believes him staying behind was a sign that he was to be her and Jim's future child they would have together.
Season 2	14	Gordon Pike (Eric Johnson)	Car crash due to drag racer crashing into wall	Crossed over	
Season 2	15	Tais Baker (Rhea Lando)	Pipe explosion in the high school boiler room	Crossed over	
Season 2	16	Randy Cooper (Chad Donella)	Suffocated due to an asthma attack	Lost spirit	
Season 2	17	Bryan Curtis (Jamie Bamber); Jason Bennett (Dan Byrd)	Suicide by stepping out into traffic Muscular dystrophy	Crossed over Crossed over	
Season 2	18	Valerie Parker (Kathleen Wilhoite)	Abdominal aneurysm	Crossed over	
Season 2	19	Charlie Banks (Fredric Lehne); Jackson Reynolds (Gil McKinney)	Shot and killed by Milt Charles; Slipped and hit head on rock.	Crossed over Crossed over	Delia Banks' husband Naked soldier. (ranked private)
Season 2	20	Martina Rose (Allison McAtee); Amy Fields (Rachel Cannon)	Heart attack Airplane crash due to pilot error	Lost spirit Crossed over	Amy Fields died in the Season 1 finale and was previously a Lost spirit.
Season 2	21; 22	Dana Clark (Vivian Wu)	Boat sinks due to hull being torn by rocks	Crossed over	Prophet ghost, wife of Ethan Clark.
Season 3	1	Ray Billings (Ronald Blanche); Scott (Kris Lemche)	Carbon monoxide explosion Unknown	Crossed over Lost spirit	Originally haunting Melinda's mother Haunts the archives.
Season 3	2	Rachel Fordham (Mae Whitman)	Heart attack	Crossed over	Thought she was Bloody Mary.
Season 3	3	Corporal Hector Sanchez (Tony Elias); Steve Simmon (Dan Colman); Dekker (Tim Soergel)	Killed in landmine explosion	Crossed over Crossed over Crossed over	
Season 3	4	Colleen Finn (Sarah Utterback); Shane Carson (Josh Hopkins)	Falling over stairway railing Suicide by overdosing	Crossed over Lost spirit	Shane stalked Melinda and Colleen.
Season 3	5	Tessa Lucas (Amy Acker); Several Other Ghosts	Burned to death after being accused of witchcraft All burned to death in a fire someone caused after eating diseased bread	Crossed over Lost spirits	Melinda's great-great-great-grandmother that died in 1848. Lost spirits are in the old Grandview.
Season 3	6	Kevin Graham (Mike Erwin)	Car crash due to car colliding with another car	Crossed over	
Season 3	7	Sydney Drake (Austin Highsmith)	Overwhelming withdrawal symptoms	Crossed over	
Season 3	8	Liz Sinclair (Stacy Edwards); Matt Sembrook (Matthew Morrison); Vivian Sembrook (Kathleen York)	Falling off a cliff Natural gas poisoning Natural gas poisoning	Crossed over Lost spirit Lost spirit	Liz Sinclair sacrificed herself so her husband could save their daughter.
Season 3	9	Daniel Asher (Masam Holden); Audrey Asher (Anne Ramsay); Sam Asher (Javi Mulero)	Burned to death in a car crash Car crash due to car colliding with gasoline tanker Car crash due to car colliding with a gasoline tanker	Shiny; Crossed over Crossed over	
Season 3	10	Alan Silver (Gordon Clapp)	Heart attack	Did not cross over	Thought he was Santa, realized he wasn't, but decided he liked helping kids so he stuck around.
Season 3	11	Thomas Benjamin (Marshall Allman)	Hit his head on a chalkboard	Crossed over	
Season 3	12	Peter Harrison (Lawrence Pressman)	Requested euthanasia via lethal dose of isonitrile	Crossed over	
Season 3	13	Karen Benton (Mandy June Turpin)	Cancer	Crossed over	
Season 3	14	Justin Yates (Omid Abtahi); Julie Anderson (Katie Lowes)	brain aneurysm Drowned on boat she capsized for an insurance scam.	Crossed over Lost spirit	
Season 3	15	Toby Bates (Jonathan Murphy)	Fell out of a window	Crossed over	
Season 3	16	Kate Payne (Rachel Shelley); Zach (Mark Hapka)	Crushed to death by a crane Crashed his bike and hit his head on a piece of debris	Crossed over Crossed over	Rick Payne's wife, seen in previous episodes. Web episode
Season 3	17	Michael Wilkins (Braeden Lemasters)	Fell off a tree and was hanged by the cape he was wearing	Shiny	
Season 3	18	Paul Eastman (Corin Nemec); Tom Gordon (Martin Donovan)	Bludgeoned to death with a stair post Thrown down the stairs	Crossed over Lost spirit	Melinda's father, killed pre-Ghost Whisperer; Melinda's stepfather.
Season 4	1	Fiona Raine (Alona Tal)	Burned to death in a fire	Crossed over	
Season 4	2	Lucas Marston (Christian Campbell)	Accidental drug overdose	Crossed over	Melinda's classmate.
Season 4	3	Larry Jones (Raphael Sbarge)	Heart attack	Crossed over	
Season 4	4	Lorelei (Peyton List); Betty (Katherine LaNasa); Several other ghosts	Fell to her death in a ship duct Heart failure Various deaths	Crossed over Refused to cross over Crossed over	
Season 4	5	Diana Morrison (Camryn Grimes)	Blood clot in lung	Crossed over	
Season 4	6	Owen Grace (Tanner Maguire); Jim Clancy (David Conrad)	Slipped and hit head on rock Air embolism due to being shot in the shoulder	Shiny; Living in Sam Lucas' body	- Melinda's husband
Season 4	7	Sam Lucas (Kenneth Mitchell); Caitlin Mahoney (Alexa Nikolas); Dan Clancy (Rodney Scott)	Car crash due to car colliding with other car Died from complications of anorexia nervosa Fell off a roof and died	Crossed over Crossed over Crossed over	- - Jim Clancy's brother, seen in the pilot episode. Crossed over in this episode.
Season 4	8	Alan Walters (Todd Stashwick)	Car crash due to hitting a motorcycle	Crossed over	Was the driver of the car that hit Sam Lucas' motorcycle; he was angry that "Sam"/Jim came back to life.
Season 4	9	Gretchen Dennis (Isabelle Fuhrman)	Fell down a well and drowned while reaching for a note she stuck on the inside-wall of the well	Shiny	
Season 4	10	Tammy Gardner/ Sarah Evers (Rena Sofer)	Murder via being drugged and carbon monoxide poisoning	Crossed over	
Season 4	11	Josh Bancroft (Wyatt Smith)	Exsanguination after being thrown from a riding mower and cut up	Shiny	
Season 4	12	Angie Hollensbach (Kaylee DeFer); Myrna Cooperton (Maree Cheatham); Frank Whitaker (Dan Castellaneta); Drina (Maria Carmen)	Hit by a car Natural Causes; Truck gave way while fixing flat Unknown	Crossed over Crossed over Crossed over Did not cross over	Delia's old friend from high school/First ghost that Eli crossed over without Melinda
Season 4	13	Carl Sessick (David Clennon); Edwin Hathaway (Arye Gross); Numerous Ghosts	Died of lung cancer Stroke; Various deaths	Did not cross over Crossed over All crossed over	Followed the Watchers, on the quest for good Died in the hospital but dumped into the lake due to furnace problems at funeral home Dumped into a lake due to furnace problems at funeral home
Season 4	14	Deborah Marks (Gretchen Egolf)	Tripped and hit her head on a fireplace post	Crossed over	Had to let the son she gave up for adoption know that she was his mother. He had been falling for his half sister. Her daughter though Deborah had a crush on him.
Season 4	15	Rebecca Kelly (Andrea Bowen)	Caught in a rock slide, pushed off a cliff face and was hanged by a net	Crossed over	
Season 4	16	Jeffery Crockett (Carrie's Dad) (Patrick Labyorteaux)	Natural causes	Crossed over	
Season 4	17	Greer Clarkson (Darby Stanchfield); Numerous Ghosts	Botched shock therapy treatments Botched shock therapy treatments	Crossed over Crossed over	
Season 4	18	Ben Tillman / Joseph Webb (Mark Pellegrino); Calvin Byrd (Michael O'Keefe)	Leukemia; Natural Causes	Living in Ben Tillman's body Crossed over	Became a "step-in", living in Ben Tillman's body
Season 4	19	Rick Hartman (Currie Graham)	Committed suicide by jumping out of a plane	Crossed over	
Season 4	20	Miles Maitland (Johnny Pacar)	Prop gun backfired and shot him in the side of his head.	Crossed over	
Season 4	21	Stanton family Marc (Eyad Kurd-Misto)	Carbon monoxide poisoning	Crossed over Did not cross over	Web episode
Season 4	22	Andrew Carlin (Jake Thomas)	Thrombocytosis	Crossed over	
Season 4	23	Zoe Ramos (Jaclyn DeSantis)	Fell down the stairs	Crossed over	Eli's girlfriend; guardian of the Book of Changes
Season 5	1	Amber Heaton (Zoe Boyle)	Aortic rupture during childbirth	Crossed over	
Season 5	2	Gwen Collier (Amy Gumenick); Paula Coritter (Gigi Rice); Scarlett Breslin (Haley Hudson)	Hit by an SUV; Inoperable brain tumor Accused of slanderous gossip, eyes and mouth were stitched shut	Crossed over Crossed over Lost Spirit	Scarlett made Julia Miller create the "Sally Stitch" website.
Season 5	3	Ray James (Barry Newman); Evelyn James (Christine Estabrook)	Heart attack Aneurysm	Did not cross over Did not cross over	Eli's parents. They stayed around to watch over Eli.
Season 5	4	Dr. Albert Glassman (David Andrews); Ghost in the morgue	Heart attack Unknown	Crossed over Unknown	The ghost in the morgue probably crossed under just like Greta Hansen
Season 5	5	Amy Warner (Thea Gill)	Breast cancer	Crossed over	
Season 5	6	Sean Flannery (Riley Smith)	Thrown off of a horse	Crossed over	
Season 5	7	Tina Clark (Emily Rose)	Drug overdose and car accident	Crossed over	
Season 5	8	Kirk Jansen (Greg Germann); Rita Jansen (Perrey Reeves)	Walked into a crawl space that had aflatoxis, a mold that made him go into anaphylaxis Fatal electrocution from a light table she smashed with a golf club	Crossed over Crossed over	
Season 5	9	Julia Miller (Madison Leisle)	Leukemia	Shiny	Originally attached herself to Aiden to keep from going into the light.
Season 5	10	Dylan Hale (Evan Peters)	Accidentally bludgeoned to death with a baseball bat	Crossed Over	
Season 5	11	Bruce Adler (Jordan Belfi)	Car accident when the car went into the river	Crossed Over	
Season 5	12	Trevor Marshall (Charlie Koznick)	Fell and was impaled to death by a metal pike	Crossed Over	
Season 5	13	Vernon Dokes (Bruno Campos); Marlene Dokes (Jamie Anderson); Lane Dokes (Megan Henning)	Suicide by exsanguination from wrist cutting due to Fatal familial insomnia (FFI); Exsanguination by being slashed in the arm Suicide by jumping off a bridge due to FFI.	Crossed Over; Crossed Over; Crossed over	
Season 5	14	Madison Clark (Mary Mouser)	Car accident	Shiny	
Season 5	15	Joey Kale (Joey Luthman); Josh Bedford (Bruce Davison); Numerous Ghosts	Suffocated to death inside an old army storage unit Died in a bomb explosion Numerous Deaths	Shiny; Did not cross over Stayed on the old army base	
Season 5	16	Cassidy Peyton (Joey King); Madame Greta Hansen (Deborah Van Valkenburgh); Garrett (Ronnie Steadman); Naomi (Dendrie Taylor); Sick Boy (Larell VanBuren)	Guillain–Barré syndrome Wheelchair fell down the stairs Execution by electric chair Execution by hanging Disease	Shiny; Crossed Under; Crossed Over; Crossed Over; Did not cross over	Cassidy crossed over but came back to talk to Aiden and revealed that ghost children became shinies Greta made a deal with the shadows that as long as she feeds them children's ghosts they would not take her. Greta used Cassidy to lure him to their mansion before he died.
Season 5	17	Shane Dunning (Nathan Halliday)	Fell through an ice lake and drowned	Crossed Over	
Season 5	18	Charlie Hammond (John Asher)	Asphyxiated to death on a balloon	Crossed Over	
Season 5	19	Laura Bradley (Catherine Dent)	Poisoned to death with Chloramine gas	Crossed Over	
Season 5	20	Henry Alston (Sean Marquette)	Murdered by Geoff Colson via gunshot wound	Crossed Over	
Season 5	21	Kyle Farber / Seth Farber (Michael Graziadei); Sharon Farber (Stephanie Lemelin)	Fell to his death off a roof Died in the plane crash	Shiny; Crossed Over	She crossed over when all of the spirits in the plane crash crossed over at the same time in the Season 01 episode 22 "The One"
Season 5	22	Pete Murphy (Billy Unger); Numerous Children	Hodgkins Disease; Polio	Shiny; Shinies	

== Lost spirits ==
These are some of the spirits who either did not cross over or went to the Dark Side (Hell).

- Laughing Man (appears with Romano and is a ghostly agent for the dark side. He wears a two-piece suit and is usually seen laughing. He was portrayed by Douglas Bierman; death was from accidental ingestion of water dropwort)
- Bleeding Man (a dark spirit whose right hand is bleeding, hence his name. He was portrayed by Lou Glenn; death was from exsanguination)
- Bloody Mary, a girl who was accidentally buried alive and died in the coffin, scratching her nails off on the seal of the coffin. Seen in the last seconds of Episode 2, Season 3
- Giles Nickelburg (plane crash due to pilot error)
- Greg Carter (car accident due to car going off a cliff)
- Martha Rucker (building collapse)
- Unnamed Man (conjunctivitis infection)
- Greta Hansen (wheelchair fell down the stairs)
- Tom Gordon (fell down the stairs)
- Eli's parents (death from natural causes. Melinda helps them see The Light after solving a problem between them. The problem was caused by the fact that Eli's mother was a lesbian and had an affair with a friend. Eli's father thought she was really having a love affair with her friend's husband, making his spirit unable to cross over. They decide to stay to take care of her son, although he disagrees with the idea.)
- Shane Carson (suicide to continue stalking Melinda)
- Randy Cooper (asthma attack)

== Shinies and Shadows ==
Two different kinds of spirits that appear throughout the series. They are sworn enemies of each other, created by the emotions of ghosts, and feed upon others. Aiden Lucas, Melinda's son, is the only one who has the ability to see both of them while his mother and the Watchers cannot.

=== Shinies ===
Beings of good who are composed of light energy. Aiden reveals, in Season 5, that the Shinies are ghost children that have crossed over into The Light. He also comments that there are more Shinies than there are Shadows, and that if they were to go to war with each other, the Shinies would win. The Shadows prevent their growing numbers by consuming still-earthbound ghost children, making the Shinies fear them. But in the episode "The Children's Parade", Aiden reveals that if he, along with the other Shinies, use their combined power, they can defeat the Shadows forever.

In previous seasons, the Shinies have already revealed their presence to Melinda without her knowing. Carl, a Watcher, tells Melinda that she is surrounded by "light beings" watching over her and they are shown all throughout Grandview, watching over her during her wedding vow renewal. In later events, Melinda notices Aiden talking to himself. But later events reveal that Aiden has the ability to see these spirits (the Shinies), which she cannot see. Cassidy Peyton, a ghost girl Melinda crossed over, becomes a Shiny after going into The Light and becomes good friends with Aiden.

Shinies are attracted to "shiny things" such as flashlights, utensils, etc. Also, the Shinies are afraid of the Shadows, as depicted in the season 5 episode "Lost in the Shadows".

In the series finale ("The Children's Parade") the Shinies, led by Aiden, destroy the Shadows once and for all.

=== Shadows ===
The Shadows are ghosts who are seen as beings of darkness. Aiden reveals that the Shadows are either "broken pieces" left behind by ghosts who have crossed over or have "crossed under". Ghosts describe them as cold things and don't like to talk about them. They feed on the negative emotions of ghosts, especially ghost children, break their souls beyond repair, and feed on the remnants.

In previous seasons, Gabriel was working for them, but since he disappeared they could no longer block The Light. They are extremely dangerous and use people, both living and dead, to gather the souls of ghost children so that they may feed; examples are President Bedford of Rockland University to get the Book of Changes, which helps Melinda, Eli and Aiden, but they killed him when he could not complete the task. Another is Greta Hansen, a woman in a wheelchair who helped the Shadows by luring children's spirits into her house (using Cassidy Peyton), but Melinda saved some spirits imprisoned by the ghost Greta.

Ravens are their symbols, and they fear lights, shiny things, and the Shinies.
