= Tyler Patrick Jones =

American actor (born 1994)

- Born: March 12, 1994 (age 32); California, United States
- Other name: Tyler Jones
- Education: Chapman University
- Occupation: Actor
- Years active: 2000–2012

Tyler Patrick Jones (born March 12, 1994) is an American former child actor known for his recurring role as Ned Banks on the CBS television show Ghost Whisperer.

== Filmography ==
Film
Year	Film	Role	Notes
2002	Minority Report	Older Sean	
2002	Red Dragon	Josh Graham	
2004	Silver Lake	Young Dennis Patterson	TV movie
2005	Fathers and Sons	Nick 10–12 years old	
2005	Bad News Bears	Timmy Lupus	
2005	Feast	Cody	
2005	Yours, Mine & Ours	Michael Beardsley	
2007	Ben 10: Race Against Time	Cash	TV movie
2008	The Spiderwick Chronicles	Additional performer	
2009	G-Force	Connor	
Television series
Year	Title	Role	Episode
2000	Family Law	Tommy Pierce	"Going Home"
2002	Judging Amy	Kevin Weston	"People of the Lie"
2004	Summerland	Chris	3 episodes
2005	Crossing Jordan	Young Brian Heeley	"Total Recall"
2006-2007	Ghost Whisperer	Ned Banks	8 episodes
2008	Private Practice	Dean Miller	"A Family Thing"

== Commercials ==
- Hallmark (2001) – Daniel
- Macy's Super Saturday Sale (2002)
- Home Depot (2003)
- Walt Disney World: Magical Gatherings (2003)
- Yahoo (2006)
- Dairy Queen (2008)
