= Water dropwort =

Water dropwort is a common name for several genera of plants and may refer to:

- Oenanthe (plant)
- Oxypolis
- Tiedemannia
