= Melinda Gordon =

Leading character in "Ghost Whisperer"

- Ghost Whisperer character
- Jennifer Love Hewitt as Melinda Gordon
- First appearance: "Pilot"
- Last appearance: "The Children's Parade"
- Portrayed by: Jennifer Love Hewitt

In-universe information
- Occupation: Owner of Same as It Never Was Antiques and part time medium.
- Family: Beth Gordon (mother); Paul Eastman (father; deceased); Tom Gordon (step-father; deceased); Mary Ann (grandmother, deceased)
- Spouse: Jim Clancy (m. 2005–09; widowed); Sam Lucas (m. 2009-present) (Jim's ghost possesses the body)
- Children: Unnamed child (with Jim; miscarriage); Aiden Lucas (son, with Jim)
- Relatives: Tessa Lucas (great-great-great-grandmother); Julia Lee Lucas (great-great-grandmother)

Melinda Irene Gordon is the title character of the American paranormal television series Ghost Whisperer created by John Gray. Gordon was portrayed by American actress Jennifer Love Hewitt.

== Character background ==
Melinda Gordon (Jennifer Love Hewitt) can see and communicate with ghosts. She moved to Grandview after she married Jim Clancy, a paramedic who knows of her ability. Jim and Melinda have a son Aiden (first appearance in season 5). Melinda shared her secret with her husband Jim, friends—Professor Rick Payne, Andrea Marino, Delia Banks—and her son, Ned Banks, RU psychology professor Eli James, and her son Aiden, as well as all the relatives or friends of ghosts she has helped.

== Abilities ==
Melinda is at least a sixth-generation medium on her mother's side; her great-great-great-grandmother, Tessa, her grandmother, and her mother are also ghost whisperers. It is also later revealed that her biological father had the same ability, although it is unknown how common it was in his family and the ability was only mentioned once.

- Mediumship: Melinda can perceive and communicate with the spirits of those who are dead; using her gift to see earthbound spirits, Melinda tries to help them to cross over, either by speaking to loved ones or by doing things for them which they died before they could do/finish. Melinda can also perceive the spirits of those who are having an out-of-body experience because they are near death or comatose.
- Spiritual Empathy: According to her grandmother, Melinda will be able to feel the emotions of spirits. Initially, Melinda had a hard time telling the living from the dead, but with practice grew adept at telling them apart.
- Visions: As a result of her abilities, Melinda often receives visions of things concerning the ghost(s) she is trying to help. According to Professor Rick Payne in the season 2 episode The Ghost Within, Melinda displayed psychometry — when touching certain objects, she sometimes gets visions or flashes from the past. In the third episode of the fourth season, Melinda was able to project her consciousness inside a virtual reality to embody a game avatar to communicate with a ghost who haunted that online chat game; though a different effect than usual, Melinda herself described this as being similar to when she receives visions.
- Psychic Link: In Season 5, Melinda is revealed to be connected to her son, Aiden Lucas, who the Watchers revealed is an empath. With this, Melinda can receive visions from him.

== Appearances ==
=== Season 1 ===
Melinda and Jim moved to the small town of Grandview where Melinda opened a small antique shop, named "The Same As It Never Was ANTIQUES". She becomes friends with Andrea Marino, who comes to share management responsibilities of the store. Eventually, Melinda gains enough trust in Andrea to tell her about her ability.

In Episode 5 of Season 1, "The Lost Boys", Melinda helps three young boys to cross over into the light from an orphanage, where the young boys died. One boy, Vic, tells Melinda before they crossed over, that he will tell everyone on the other side that Mel is his mom, making Vic her unofficial adoptive son.

In the later part of the season, Melinda begins encountering a malevolent spirit (Romano) that wears a black hat while trying to "cross over" earthbound spirits.

In the season finale, a plane crashes in Grandview. Romano uses the massive death count to his advantage, "keeping" the souls that Melinda is unable to cross over, one of whom was Andrea, who died in the crash.

=== Season 2 ===
After losing her friend and business partner to the plane crash, Melinda succeeds against the dark spirit in helping Andrea and many of the other ghosts from the crash cross over.

Melinda meets several new people in Season 2, including an occult professor, Rick Payne, who often helps her with troublesome ghosts without realizing it until she tells him about her gift. She also meets widow Delia Banks and her son Ned. Melinda invites Delia to take the place of Andrea as her business partner and confides in Ned about her gift. While trying to cross over Delia's husband, in the episode "Delia's First Ghost", Melinda reveals to Delia her gift. Delia, a sceptic in anything beyond the normal things she can see, slowly begins to believe Melinda.

Throughout the season, events occur showing that the "veil" between the living and the dead is thinning. With the introduction of a second ghost whisperer, Gabriel Lawrence, it is learned through the earthbound spirit of Payne's wife that dark forces "are trying to make the dead stronger than the living." In the season finale, dark spirits try to kill four special children (each child was the sole survivor of a terrible disaster or accident). Melinda attempts to save them and succeeds, but loses her own life in the process, culminating in the fulfilment of a prophecy that would lead to the "death of a loved one" – Melinda. Only then did Melinda realize that it was her that the dark side wanted to kill, and not the children. In the limbo between life and death, Melinda sees a shadow of her father who says she has a brother. Meanwhile, the four special children help revive her (as noted under "Abilities"). She is stunned when she returns to consciousness, stating "I think I have a brother". She looks around and, from a distance, Gabriel is looking at her very crossly.

=== Season 3 ===
Melinda searches continually for her father, believing him to have died, and for her brother, whom by now she suspects is Gabriel. She speaks with her mother, who does not give her much information other than that she never had another child apart from Melinda, and that Melinda and Jim have to leave Grandview because of all the evil spirits. If not, something very bad may happen. Melinda also learns that Beth once lived in Grandview. In the fifth episode, "Weight of What Was", Gabriel arrives at her home, saying that he is her half-brother and that he is also looking for their father. He has been staying in a hotel under the name Gabriel Gordon. He hands Melinda a package that leads her to an underground church, as well as to her ancestor and great-great-grandmother, Tessa Lucas, also a ghost whisperer.

Tom Gordon appears before Melinda and reveals a little bit about her past. Melinda and Jim later discuss having children; Melinda agrees to have one.

Melinda is haunted by a ghost who is known as the Masked Man at first.

Towards the end of the season, Tom Gordon shows up in Grandview, alive and well.

When things begin to get more dangerous and suspicious, Melinda asks her mother to be honest with her and tell her everything. Her mother reveals that her birth father is a man named Paul Eastman, the same "Masked Man" who has been haunting Melinda. Tom later shows up and takes Melinda to their old home where she once lived as a child, and tries to jog her memory, to see what she remembers of the night Paul Eastman came to her house. Only then does Melinda realize that Paul was murdered by Tom? Once Tom realizes that Melinda remembers that, he tries to choke her to death. Paul arrives just in time and takes control of Tom's body, causing Tom to topple over the stairs and fall onto the floor below, killing him instantly. Tom's spirit appears and vanishes in front of Melinda.

Melinda, Beth and Paul reconcile and Paul goes into the light. After all these years of thinking that the man who she thought was her father (Tom) had abandoned her, Melinda is now glad to know that her real father (Paul) would never have abandoned her, and, had he not been dead, he would have been there by her side.

At the end of the season, what seems to be a happy moment is spoiled when Payne makes a shocking observation. He turns to Melinda and points out the fact that there are six people lined up (Delia, Beth Gordon, Ned, Jim, Melinda, and Payne himself), yet there are only five visible shadows.

=== Season 4 ===
In this season, Melinda and Jim talk about having children. Melinda meets Eli James, who has a ghost haunting him – one of his patients. In a fire, Eli and the patient, named Fiona (who died in the incident) suffered a near-death experience, and when he was revived, he discovered that he can hear the dead. They help Fiona cross over. By the end of the premiere, they develop a good partnership.

Professor Payne goes on a long trip.

In "Big Chills", Melinda helps a ghost that has to have the truth come out about an accidental death on a boat. In the next episode, she finds a dead man who is trapped in an online chat game. She realizes that the man is the teenager's father, and is trying to protect her from an online predator. Melinda and Jim go on a trip to find another ghost (or many on the boat), but the main reason is to talk to the boat owner's son, who is planning to tear down the boat and rebuild it. Many spirits are worried that their home would be ruined, so they were bothering Melinda to help them. One girl needed help to talk to the owner of the boat about the accidental death when she waited for him in the same room where she met him many years before.

Melinda meets a teenage ghost who dies on the tennis court from a blood clot in her lung. Melinda watches the dead teenager follow her friend's family home. The two families soon find out that the hospital made a mistake and they switched the girls at birth.

In the end, Melinda and Jim think she is pregnant, but are disappointed when they discover that she has had a miscarriage.

She discovers that a ghost (Owen) used to know the bride when they were young. When she finds out the truth, she calls off the wedding. Later Jim finds the groom still in the cabin, with a gun. Melinda finds out and calls a detective. When Melinda and the detective get there they see two shadows through the door windows—one man with the gun and one man without. The detective pulls out the gun and shoots but appears to hit Jim, who falls in front of the window. He is rushed to the hospital, and Melinda waits by his bedside. Eventually, she sees Jim kneeling in front of her. Happy to see that he's awake, Melinda approaches him, only for Jim to reveal that he had an embolism. The nurses rush to save him but are unsuccessful.

In the next episode, Jim keeps saying throughout that he will not cross over, no matter how hard Melinda tries. There is a teenage ghost who keeps saying she's sorry and that it's all her fault that Jim is dead. It turns out that the teenager was anorexic and that made her heart stop. Her stepfather was very depressed, and he went back to work before he was ready to. Later it is found out that the girl's stepfather is the detective who shot Jim. Melinda says to Jim "You have to do the right thing." He replies "I know." and possesses the body of a dead man, Sam, to live again in episode 4.07 "Threshold". Melinda happily says to Jim "You're back" to which Jim/Sam replies "Do I know you?"

Melinda begins dating Jim/Sam when Sam's ex-girlfriend Nikki leaves Grandview. Melinda revealed her gift to Jim/Sam and his response was unexpected. Melinda told Jim/Sam he is Jim and Jim/Sam tells Melinda that he thinks she needs help. Melinda finally gives up and painfully tells him to leave, thinking that no matter how hard she tries, Jim will never be back.

But later, Melinda gets trapped in an underground chamber that was rapidly filling up with water and Jim/Sam comes to her rescue. When he was swimming towards her, he suddenly gets flashes of his life as Jim, memories of his life and of the times with Melinda. Melinda saves Jim/Sam from drowning and is surprised when he asks her why she is calling him Sam and that she should just call him Jim. Melinda realizes that Jim is back and reconciles with him. Soon after, she learns she is eight weeks pregnant with Jim's baby.

Melinda began to have nightmares and visions that her baby is in danger.

Jim reveals to Melinda that he had seen her chart accidentally and knew it was a boy. He knew they agreed not to find out, but he told her to ease her mind, so she'd see her visions and dreams were wrong and her was actually about Zoe, who was Eli's ex-girlfriend and was killed accidentally when she fell down the steps, startled by a thief (who is being controlled by the Watcher Carl) in her house. They were trying to hide an ancient tome written in multiple languages called The Book of Changes, in Zoe's house (Zoe was unknowingly the destined caretaker). Eli then became the caretaker of the book and was warned by one of the Watchers (Carl) that people were after the book, he must safeguard it and be also warned he must not show it to Melinda.

Melinda, however, couldn't get the idea something was wrong out of her mind and convinced Eli to show her the book. The book had their names in it, followed by odd dates. The dates were revered; Melinda realized they were dates of death. Andrea was there, as were Jim, Sam, Zoe and even Eli from his near-death experience. She was also listed as September 25 meaning Melinda will give birth to her son on that day. Later Melinda confronts Carl in the tunnels and wants to know if her son is in danger. Carl tells Melinda that white light spirits are watching over her, but the balance can shift and her son is the key. Carl advises her to teach her son about the other side, not shield him from it because her son will be able to do much, much more than she can. Jim and Melinda marry again at the same place they met – in front of witnesses, Eli James (best man) and Delia Banks (matron of honour), and a full gathering of spirits.

=== Season 5 ===
Melinda starts off the season with Jim, and Melinda being close to giving birth to their child, who is later born and given Jim's father's name, Aiden, and Sam's last name Lucas, in honour of Sam, who unknowingly gave Jim the chance to raise his and Melinda's son. Carl, the watcher, continues to watch over Jim, Melinda, and Aiden as the season goes on. At one point, the ghost of Julia, the little girl who sent out the Sally Stitch emails in Episode 5 is revealed to be attached to Aiden and shows Aiden the shadows and we get to see the Shinies for the first time. Aiden saves Julia from the shadows with his flashlight, which Aiden named Flash. During the ordeal, Aiden was missing according to Jim and Melinda, showing at the beginning of episode 9, that Aiden was gone. Thanks to Carl, the Shinies, Jim, Detective Blair, Eli, Delia, Ned, and Melinda, they find Aiden and help Julia cross over. As the season continues from Episode 9, Melinda starts to slowly be possessed by the shadows. Carl, deemed untrustworthy by Melinda because of a possessed session that Eli was under in the middle of the night, convinces Aiden that the shinies have to turn night into day to save Melinda. Jim and Melinda tell Aiden to just be himself and not to deny his gift, even if it doesn't feel like a gift at some point in his future. The last exchange between Melinda and Aiden is there. "I meant what I said you know," Melinda says, referring to Aiden saving her from the shadows, "You were my hero tonight." Aiden replies, "Just like you are mom. Every day."

== Analysis ==
Melinda Gordon is often compared to Allison DuBois in the TV series Medium, but Gordon is not explicitly described as a medium. Karin Beeler calls her a "younger, postfeminist heroine than the women in Medium and Afterlife, sporting low-cut outfits that have often been identified with the body-conscious television characters of the third wave or postfeminist generation (e.g. Buffy, the witch sisters in Charmed, Tru Davies in Tru Calling)."
