= Mary Ann Winkowski =

American television medium

- Born: 1948 (age 76–77); Cleveland, Ohio, USA
- Occupation(s): Television personality, author, and medium
- Known for: Ghost Whisperer
- Website: maryannwinkowski.com

Mary Ann Winkowski (born 1948) is an American television personality whose paranormal experiences are the basis for CBS's Ghost Whisperer, on which she was also a paid producer. At the time the show began, she was often paid to attend funerals to help relatives have one last conversation with a loved one. Since the show's release, Winkowski has published five books: two non-fiction books, When Ghosts Speak (2007) and As Alive, So Dead (2011); two novels with Maureen Foley, The Book of Illumination (2009) and The Ice Cradle (2010); and a cook book, Beyond Delicious (2011), with David Powers.

Winkowski was born in Cleveland, Ohio in 1948. She says she began seeing ghosts as a toddler, around the time her younger sister was born.

As of 2011, she lived in North Royalton, Ohio. She is a breast cancer survivor and has two children.

== Publications ==
- Winkowski, Mary Ann (2007). When Ghosts Speak: Understanding the World of Earthbound Spirits. Grand Central Publishing. ISBN 978-0-446-40968-1.
- Winkowski, Mary Ann; Foley, Maureen (2009). The Book of Illumination: A Novel from the Ghost Files. Crown. ISBN 978-0-307-45245-0.
- Winkowski, Mary Ann; Foley, Maureen (2010). The Ice Cradle: A Novel from the Ghost Files. Crown. ISBN 978-0-307-45247-4.
- Winkowski, Mary Ann (2011). As Alive, So Dead: Investigating the Paranormal. Graveworm Press. ISBN 978-1-929-30910-8.
- Winkowski, Mary Ann; Powers, David (2011). Beyond Delicious: The Ghost Whisperer's Cookbook. Clerisy Press. ISBN 978-1-578-60500-2.
