= John Gray (director) =

American writer, director, producer

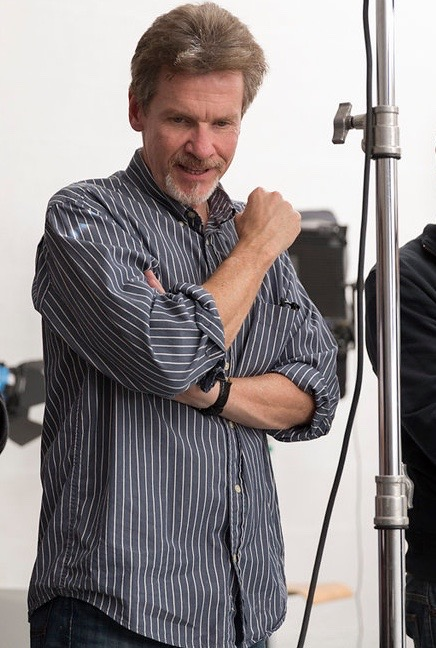
- Born: Brooklyn, New York, U.S.
- Occupations: Writer; producer; director
- Years active: 1983–present
- Known for: Ghost Whisperer
- Spouse: Melissa Jo Peltier (married 2006–present)
- Children: 1

John Gray is an American writer, director, producer. He is the creator of the CBS television series Ghost Whisperer starring Jennifer Love Hewitt. He has written and directed feature movies as well.

Gray has written and directed many movies for television, such as the remake of the 1976 telefilm Helter Skelter, Martin and Lewis, The Hunley, The Day Lincoln Was Shot, and several Hallmark Hall of Fame movies.

He directed the ABC original series Empire.

== Filmography ==
=== Film ===
Title	Year	Credited as			Notes
Title	Year	Director	Producer	Writer	Notes
Footlights and Flatfeet	1984	Yes	No	Yes	Also actor
Billy Galvin	1986	Yes	No	Yes	
Born to Be Wild	1995	Yes	No	No	
The Glimmer Man	1996	Yes	No	No	
White Irish Drinkers	2010	Yes	Yes	Yes	
French Kiss	2015	Yes	No	Yes	Short film
The Desecrated	2018	Yes	Yes	Yes	Short film
Extra Innings	2019	Yes	Yes	Yes	Short film
Household Demons	2020	Yes	Yes	Yes	Short film
Exit Package	2020	Yes	Yes	Yes	Short film
Welcome to Forever	2021	Yes	Yes	Yes	Short film
The Game Is Up: Disillusioned Trump Voters Tell Their Stories	2021	No	No	No	Documentary; Executive producer
The Little Drummer Boy	2021	Yes	Yes	Yes	Short film
The Third Defector	2022	Yes	Yes	Yes	Short film

=== Television ===
The numbers in directing and writing credits refer to the number of episodes.

Title	Year	Credited as				Network	Notes
Title	Year	Creator	Director	Writer	Executive producer	Network	Notes
Powerhouse	1983	No	Yes (1)	No	No	PBS	
Monsters	1989	No	Yes (1)	No	No	Syndicated	
When He's Not a Stranger	1989		Yes	Teleplay	No	CBS	Television film
The Lost Capone	1990		Yes	Yes	No	TNT	Television film
The Marla Hanson Story	1991		Yes	Story and teleplay	No	NBC	Television film
An American Story	1992		Yes	Story and teleplay	No	CBS	Hallmark Hall of Fame television film
A Place for Annie	1994		Yes	No	No	ABC	Hallmark Hall of Fame television film
Sleep, Baby, Sleep	1995		No	Teleplay	No	ABC	Television film
The Day Lincoln Was Shot	1998		Yes	Teleplay	No	TNT	Television film
The Hunley	1999		Yes	Story and teleplay	No	TNT	Television film
Haven	2001		Yes	No	No	CBS	Television film
Brian's Song	2001		Yes	Teleplay	No	ABC	Television film
The Seventh Stream	2001		Yes	Yes	No	CBS	Hallmark Hall of Fame television film Co-executive producer
Martin and Lewis	2002		Yes	Yes	No	CBS	Television film
Helter Skelter	2004		Yes	Yes	No	CBS	Television film
Empire	2005	No	Yes (2)	No	No	ABC	
Ghost Whisperer	2005–10	Yes	Yes (14)	Yes (18)	Yes	CBS	Executive producer (seasons 1–3)
Hide	2011		Yes	No	No	TNT	Mystery Movie Night television film
The Makeover	2013		Yes	No	No	ABC	Hallmark Hall of Fame television film
Reckless	2014	No	Yes (3)	No	No	CBS	Co-executive producer
Grimm	2014, 2017	No	Yes (2)	No	No	NBC	
The Family	2016	No	Yes (2)	No	No	ABC	Co-executive producer
Gone	2017	No	Yes (2)	No	No	TF1	
