= List of The Pretender characters =

This is an article for a list of recurring characters from the American television series, The Pretender. The main character Jarod, played by Michael T. Weiss, is a genius who assumes new identities and masters new professions in every episode.

== Main character ==
=== Jarod ===
(Michael T. Weiss, 1996–2000)
(Ryan Merriman, 1996–2000) {portrayed Young Jarod}

A 'pretender'; a super-genius polymath with eidetic and working memory (possibly Hyperthymesia), who has the ability to be anyone, learn any skill and function in any situation – a chameleon who takes on identities as easily as most people change clothes. It is revealed at the climax of the second season that because of Jarod's rare genealogy, he is genetically dispositioned to being a "Pretender." According to The Pretender: Rebirth, Jarod uses about 20% of his brain, while most people use about 10%. It is also revealed near the end of season 2 that Jarod and his brother, Kyle, share a rare blood type, AB− blood. It is mentioned twice in season 4 ("Risque Business" & "Cold Dick"), that Jarod has a pistachio allergy. Since at least the time from when he was abducted, he has known the couplet "Kri Kra Toad's Foot, Geese Walk Bare-foot" (which is the English translation of the German couplet "Kri Kra Kroten-Fuss, Gänse Laufen Bar-Fuss").

In 1963, Jarod was taken from his parents as a young child, and grew up within the Centre as a virtual test subject until his escape in 1996. During his time growing up, he knew the young girl who would grow up to be his pursuer, Miss Parker. In the season one episode "Bomb Squad", Jarod is described as having had an "erudite, European upbringing" and that the cadence in Jarod's voice betray the fact that he was raised by a "French or Belgian nanny". Since his escape from the Centre, Jarod has been searching for his family: his mother, Margaret, his father, Charles (a.k.a. "Major Charles", an ex-Air Force officer), and his surviving siblings, Emily (his younger sister), "Jeremy" (his 14-year-old clone), and Ethan (his younger half-brother whom he shares with Miss Parker). The second motivating factor in Jarod's life is atoning for the deaths he inadvertently caused by working for The Centre; because of this, he identifies himself with Onyssius, an Ancient Greek God of Retribution (mentioned in the pilot episode, the first of the two The Pretender telemovies, The Pretender 2001, and the first book of the renewed series, The Pretender: Rebirth).

Jarod usually avoids being caught by The Centre at the end of every episode and has, at times, engineered close calls for the purposes of gloating. Following his escapes, Jarod enjoys sparring with Miss Parker over the phone. He often, comically, uses her name in many of his insults at his job prior to the episode. An example of this occurs when he is working as a substitute teacher for chemistry and tells his students that "roaches would be the only living thing after a biological holocaust. Them and some woman named 'Parker'."

Due to his adaptability, insight, athleticism, and intelligence, Jarod is extremely formidable in his 'pretends' and elusive as a fugitive from the Centre. He routinely passes as an expert and experienced practitioner of various trades and can anticipate virtually all of the fugitive retrieval methods employed by the Centre. However, he does have several limitations and vulnerabilities. While Jarod can seemingly master any profession, he must find or create the means of replicating physical activities; for example, taking swim lessons prior to posing as a Coast Guard officer. While he can quickly learn existing knowledge, he has the same limits of discovery for new knowledge as traditional research, such as requiring labs and testing facilities for drug development. Once he has mastered a discipline, innovations are just as difficult for him as they are for any other practitioner, though he does possess cross-disciplinary insights. His deceptions are thorough but cannot stand up to intense scrutiny; as such, he always has to operate under a time limit before being discovered for his frauds. He has a deep psychological need to discover the truth about his past and unwavering commitment to his surviving family members; because of this, he has demonstrated a willingness to endanger and expose himself on their behalf. He possesses a strong moral center and can become emotional when faced with the abuse or neglect of the vulnerable, particularly children and the elderly; he is similarly incensed by abuses of power, causing his emotions to cloud his judgment, if not his intelligence. Finally, Jarod can make mistakes and become frustrated when he cannot acquire all available data, especially that of a private or personal nature; he cannot accurately predict the actions of people or organizations where there is limited information on their motivations, objectives, or goals.

== Other protagonists ==
=== Miss Parker ===
(Andrea Parker, 1996–2000) {main cast member}
(Ashley Peldon, 1996–1999) {portrayed Young Miss Parker}

A child of the Centre, "Miss Parker" has grown up within the Blue Cove complex, with both her father and mother playing pivotal roles in the organization. Her father, "Mr. Parker", is apparently the local administrator of the Blue Cove branch of the Centre. Miss Parker has a twin brother named Lyle, who was at first believed to be stillborn. When she was still a young girl, her mother Catherine Parker adopted a girl named Faith, who was dying of leukemia.

Soon after Faith's adoption, Catherine gave birth to Miss Parker's half-brother, Ethan. This child was the result of Project Mirage, in which Catherine Parker was impregnated with sperm from Jarod's father Major Charles (making Ethan, Jarod's half-brother, as well). The Centre scientist Mr. Raines (who is also Mr. Parker's brother) delivered the child and then apparently killed Catherine. Miss Parker was told that her mother committed suicide. Faith died shortly afterward. Miss Parker only learned as an adult, thanks partly to Jarod, that her mother had actually been killed. The full circumstances of Catherine Parker's death vary depending on who is giving the account. As an adult, Miss Parker also learned that her biological father is, in fact, Raines.

As a young girl, Miss Parker met secretly with Jarod while he was also a child at the Centre. Miss Parker gave Jarod his first kiss when they were young. By adulthood, circumstances had changed and Miss Parker seems to hold Jarod in contempt. Miss Parker becomes a formidable field operative for the Centre before eventually joining the "corporate" side of the organization. When Jarod escapes the Centre, Miss Parker is "recalled from Corporate" and assigned to recapture him. Her anger towards the rogue Pretender increases as he repeatedly eludes and humiliates her. Despite this, Jarod helps Miss Parker learn more about her own past and comes to her aid when she is in danger, even when it risks his own safety.

As the series progresses, Miss Parker's attitude toward Jarod softens, though not by much. When Jarod and she discover their shared links on the Isle of Carthis, they nearly have a romantic interlude. Eventually, however, Miss Parker ignores Jarod's pleas and allows him to be apprehended by the Centre. Jarod manages to escape again, and Miss Parker is returned to her task of hunting him. She later receives another phone call from her longtime enemy, but this time they do not trade insults as usual. Miss Parker warns that she will continue to be coming after him, but wishes him luck in his journey to find his family.

=== Sydney ===
(Patrick Bauchau, 1996–2000) {main cast member}
(Alex Wexo, 1996–2000) {portrayed Young Sydney} {appeared in 27 episodes}

Born sometime before World War II, Sydney comes from a French/Belgian background (his father was in the Belgian infantry), and his family's background was devout Roman Catholic. Sydney's family includes his father John-Michael, his mother Gretta, and his identical twin brother, Jacob; a sister is also mentioned, but never elaborated upon. During World War II, Sydney's family is rounded up by the Nazis; John-Michael and Gretta are sent to the gas chambers (despite the fact that the family was not Jewish), while Jacob and Sydney became the subject of experiments, since they are twins.

After World War II, Sydney and Jacob later relocated to the US and attended Yale University, Sydney studying to become a psychologist and psychiatrist, psychogenics being one of his fields of expertise (mentioned in the second episode). Together, they were later recruited into the staff of the Centre. Some years later on, Jacob became comatose following a car accident with Sydney at the wheel. Feeling responsible, Sydney hides his comatose brother from the Centre. Sydney becomes the organization's lead psychiatrist and is assigned to mentor and direct young Jarod. For years, Sydney guides the boy through simulations so the Centre may use his knowledge. Sydney is not meant to be a father figure to Jarod and outwardly resists this role, though privately, he is shown to have developed a deep fondness and loyalty to the boy.

When the adult Jarod later escapes the Centre, Sydney is assigned to aid Miss Parker in recapturing him. Though he does so, Sydney also prevents Miss Parker at times when he believes Jarod's safety is in danger. Throughout the pursuit, he also has several conversations with Jarod over the phone and empathizes with the rogue Pretender's quest to learn about his past and find a new life. Sydney's obvious loyalty to Jarod at times puts him in a dangerous position with Miss Parker and the Centre.

In the season-two episode "Bulletproof", Sydney learns he fathered a child with an old lover Michelle, a boy named Nicolas. Later in the series, Jarod devises a method that temporarily returns Jacob to consciousness. Sydney at lasts makes peace with his brother and Jacob dies peacefully.

=== Kyle ===
(Jeffrey Donovan, 1997–1999) {appeared in four episodes}
(Zachary Browne, 1996–1999) {portrayed Young Kyle}

Kyle first appeared as a child in "Happy Landings" and as an adult in the season-one, two-part finale "Back to the Dragon House".

Kyle is first seen as a child in the episode "Happy Landings", where he is revealed as another boy trained at the Centre under the care of Mr. Raines (who then was still Dr. Raines). Kyle's story is then expanded further in the two-part "Back to the Dragon House". According to that episode, Kyle is the brother of Jarod, though neither remembered this fact due to the memory repression following the trauma of their kidnappings. Like Jarod, young Kyle is to be a Pretender, though Dr. Raines also wishes to mold the boy into a killer operative with no morality.

After seeing Kyle in the hallway, young Jarod insists on meeting him, anxious finally to have a friend close to his own age. Jarod and Kyle are allowed to see each other on multiple occasions, as they run simulations together. They do not know at the time that they are brothers. They develop a friendship and secretly communicate when they realize their cells are near each other. Raines is frustrated when he realizes that Jarod's morality is affecting Kyle. During one simulation, Jarod is tricked by Raines into pouring acid on Kyle's right hand, leaving a permanent scar between his thumb and forefinger. Jarod apologizes as Kyle is taken away and the two do not see each other again during their time at the Centre.

The Centre officially releases Kyle from its facility, but in truth, Dr. Raines secretly keeps Kyle in sublevel 27 of the Centre facility. Kyle is told that Jarod is dead and is forbidden to have contact with others. He is forced to live in SL 27 while Raines uses negative reinforcement to warp him into a sociopathic personality. Kyle is taught to believe in the mantra: "I decide who lives or dies." Some of Kyle's training involves learning to hate Catherine Parker, mother of Miss Parker.

As an adult, Kyle leaves the Centre (years before Jarod does the same). As he later explains, his "brain was mush" by this time and his only purpose became to learn about his parents. During his travels, Kyle stalks and psychologically torments several people, though he never kills them. His quest for answers leads him to a former nun named Harriet Tashman and he kidnaps her. Tashman is able to escape, though. which leads to Kyle being arrested. His identity unknown, he is imprisoned simply as "John Doe".

Ten years later, Kyle escapes from prison ("Back to the Dragon House" Part 1). Jarod (who only left the Centre himself less than a year earlier), learns of Kyle's escape on the news and recognizes him as the boy he burned with acid years before. Posing as an FBI agent named Jarod Ness, he examines Kyle's cell and finds a journal that has "I decide who lives or dies" written repeatedly on every page. Miss Parker, Sydney, and Broots discover the secrets of Kyle's past and that he is the John Doe fugitive. Just as Jarod is about to shoot Kyle, Miss Parker and Centre forces arrive. Kyle is captured, while Jarod escapes.

Jarod only then discovers from Harriet Tashman that she briefly knew his parents and that Kyle is actually his brother. Tashman assumes that Jarod and Kyle did not remember they had a sibling, or the faces of their parents, due to memory repression bought on by the trauma of kidnapping and the experiments of the Centre. While a nun, Jarod's parents came to the convent where Tashman lived. Kyle learned of this connection and targeted Tashman to learn more about his parents. Tashman also informs Jarod that his parents had a daughter named Emily sometime after Kyle and he were kidnapped.

Jarod breaks into the Centre, and with help, frees Kyle. Jarod convinces Kyle that he is the same boy who befriended him years ago and that they are brothers. Kyle is initially suspicious, but comes to realize the truth. Jarod helps Kyle remember more of his past and reveals that he has learned they have a sister. Despite Kyle's crimes, Jarod accepts him and asks that they work together the learn more about their past.

Furious at losing Kyle again, Raines informs the FBI on where he believes Jarod has taken him. Tashman joins Kyle and Jarod, finding a lead that their parents are in Boston. As the FBI arrives, the three attempt to escape in a van, but crash after they are fired upon. Injured, Kyle tells Jarod to continue without him: "Find our parents. Don't tell them what I became." As Tashman and Jarod escape, Kyle remains in the van and exchanges fire with the FBI. The van explodes and Jarod is forced to continue in his quest alone. Later on, Jarod calls Sydney and asks where his brother is buried, only to be told that the van burned for a long time and that no remains were found.

In the season-two episode "Red Rock Jarod", Jarod meets a young boy in Dry River, Arizona, named J.R. Miller. The boy is in need of a heart transplant, but his condition is more difficult to fix since he has the same rare blood type that Kyle and Jarod have. Events lead to Jarod being imprisoned by an enemy, but then Kyle arrives and frees him. Kyle survived the FBI attack and caused the explosion himself to cover his escape. For some time, Kyle has been stalking Miss Parker, Sydney, and Broots, so they could lead him back to Jarod. Kyle is determined to have vengeance on the Centre, killing all its members if necessary. Jarod argues that they do not need to succumb to vengeance and violence.

By the end of the episode, after helping Jarod help others, Kyle admits that altruism may be a greater cause than vengeance. Minutes later, the two are confronted by an enemy and Kyle sacrifices himself to save Jarod's life. Heartbroken, Jarod then donates Kyle's heart to J.R. Miller, ensuring that his brother saves one more life.

== Antagonists ==
=== Mr. Lyle ===
(Jamie Denton, 1997–2000) {appeared in 36 episodes}

Twin brother to Miss Parker, he was originally believed by their parents to be stillborn. In reality, he was abducted shortly after birth by Raines and given up for adoption. He was given the name Bobby Bowman by his adoptive parents. The teenaged Bobby ran away from home, faked his death, and has since been known only as Lyle (the name of his abusive foster father). Lyle dabbled for a few years in Asian organized crime, even a group of cannibals known as the Snake Eaters; a tattoo of a snake devouring itself is once spotted on his shoulder. Lyle maintains his links to criminals in that region. His time overseas was also spent dating and marrying several Asian women, toward whom he has a proclivity. He is also suspected of having mutilated and murdered at least one of his wives in the past.

Lyle surfaces in Blue Cove, Delaware, seemingly from out of just nowhere, where he is given a top position at the Centre. Ms. Parker does not initially realize that she is related to Lyle, which leaves her perplexed as to why he was so quickly promoted. At one point, Lyle is requested by one of his old Yakuza contacts to kill a witness of a Yakuza-related crime in exchange for $20 million. Jarod is outraged at the use of one of his simulations for this plan, and foils it. In retaliation, the crime bosses sever Lyle's thumb from his left hand. Although Lyle later harvests the left thumb of the then-comatose Mr. Raines and has it attached to his own hand, he eventually returns the digit to Raines as a show of loyalty when Raines is placed in charge of the Centre. Lyle is also notable for his murder of Jarod's brother, Kyle.

=== Mr. Parker ===
(Harve Presnell, 1997–2000)
(David Sawyer, 1998–1999) {portrayed Young Mr. Parker}

Mr. Parker is chairman of the Centre and has occasionally been forced to work with Raines to ensure his position. Jarod once summed Mr. Parker up as "Mr. Duplicity-Himself" (season three, episode one, "Crazy"). Over time, Mr. Raines is revealed to be his brother, although he was raised by an adoptive family, and because of this, Parker protects Raines at all costs. He appears to shoot and kill an imprisoned Raines, but this is just a deception designed to prevent his daughter from killing Raines herself.

Despite his many coverups, Mr. Parker is devoted to his daughter and ensured her safety on many occasions. Unlike Lyle and Raines, he is not as involved in the hunt to catch Jarod. After Jarod is recaptured by Centre authorities, Mr. Parker and he have a tense confrontation on board a plane. Jarod convinces Parker to glance at the mysterious scrolls that were found on the Isle of Carthis. After reading the scrolls, Mr. Parker undergoes a sudden change and determines that they must never be seen. He grabs the box containing the scrolls and jumps out of the airborne plane, where he is assumed to be dead.

=== William Raines ===
(Richard Marcus, 1996–2000) {appeared in 45 episodes}

Formerly known as Dr. Raines, William Raines is a long-time Centre staffer and the brains behind the testing that created Jarod, Angelo, and countless other individuals who were less fortunate than either. Known for the trademark squeaking of the wheels on his ever-present oxygen tank, Raines is one of the most feared people at the Centre. After a fire in SL27, Raines's lungs were badly burned and as a result he is dependent on an oxygen tank, but like all things at the Centre, the actual state of Raines's health seems to change depending on the situation. Ms. Parker once yanks the breathing apparatus out of Raines's nose when she believes him to be her mother's killer; Raines merely smiles and continues to breathe normally. Nevertheless, he continues toting his oxygen tank everywhere he goes, though he has regained the use of his voice. Raines's mission is to return Jarod to the Centre at any cost, but his real motives are always kept secret.

Raines was part of the plot to kidnap Miss Parker's twin brother (Mr. Lyle) at birth, and is the prime suspect in the murder of Catherine Parker. Mr. Parker knew that his daughter would try to kill Raines if she believed him to be the murderer. To counteract this, he appears to shoot and kill Raines himself. Ms. Parker is conveniently standing nearby to witness the faked death. He was once married to Edna Raines (now deceased) and had a daughter named Annie, who was murdered in 1975 (thanks to Jarod the criminal was caught, and her remains were later recovered). Raines is also the biological father of Ms. Parker (and Mr. Lyle), having conceived her with her mother Catherine, but the details surrounding Catherine's pregnancy are unclear.

When Jarod reunites with the surviving members of his family on a crowded street, Raines and his team of gunmen arrive to kill everyone on site. Jarod's family manages to escape, but Raines corners Jarod in an alley. When Jarod demands to know why Raines has done all this to him, Raines simply answered; "because you exist." After a standoff, Jarod turns his back on Raines, who is armed. Raines raises his pistol to kill Jarod, but an unseen gunman fires on Raines's oxygen tank, engulfing him in flames. The shooter is later revealed to be Sydney. Raines remains in an ICU for several months until he recovers from his burns. Mysteriously, following this event, his overall health seems to drastically improve.

Dr. Raines' real name is revealed to be Abel Parker, and he assumed the name of his adoptive family, "Raines". He is the real father of Ms. Parker and her brother Lyle and the biological brother of Mr. Parker. Mr. Raines also had a daughter with his wife Edna named Annie Raines, who was kidnapped and murdered (ironically, Raines had depended on Young Jarod to find her; while Jarod did identify her kidnapper/killer, he was never able to locate her body until years later).

== Supporting characters ==
=== Angelo ===
(Paul Dillon, 1996–2000) {appeared in 23 episodes}
(Jake Lloyd, 1996–1999) {portrayed Young Angelo/Timmy, appeared in five episodes}

Formerly known as Timmy, Angelo is a savant who exhibits a sponge-like power to absorb personality traits of others; he is described as having the gift of empathy by Sidney, and exhibits psychometry, discerning details through touch. Angelo was one of Dr. Raines's early attempt at creating a Pretender, an experiment that failed. Angelo often roams the vast ductwork of the Centre, discreetly spying on others. He has also been shown in several episodes to be one of Jarod's mysterious informants within at the Centre, sending him anonymous emails. At one point, Angelo begins treatments with Sydney to reverse the effects of Dr. Raines's experiments on him and begins to transform back into Timmy. As Timmy, many of his early memories return, including his ability to play the piano. With only a few treatments left, the Centre is shown to be reinitiating the "Prodigy" experiments—which was code for the Pretender project. While Jarod was a natural pretender, Raines developed a serum to chemically recreate Jarod with a child, Davey Simpkins, who had the same rare genealogy as Jarod and his bloodline. Davey is rescued by Jarod and Angelo, but because the treatments on him had already begun, he is in jeopardy of becoming another Angelo. With the cure accidentally destroyed, Angelo sacrifices his final treatment (same as the antidote for Davey), which would have completed his transformation back to Timmy, for Davey, because he is just a boy and should be allowed to be a boy. As a result, Davey returns to his old self and Angelo's progress towards Timmy is reversed and he becomes Angelo again—now permanently.

When Miss Parker finds out that she has a twin brother, she learns that one of the possible children had been Angelo; a subsequent DNA test proves that the twin is Mr. Lyle.

=== Argyle ===
(Leland Orser 1998–2000)

Appearing in three episodes, ["Unforgotten" (season two), "Unsinkable" (season three), and "Cold Dick" (season four)], he was named "Argyle" for a birthmark. He calls Jarod "J-Rod". When he first met Jarod, he saved Jarod's life... and then tried to sell him to Brigitte and the Centre. The second time he meets Jarod, Argyle had put advertisements in newspapers asking for Jarod's help. The third time Argyle met with Jarod, it was in Las Vegas. Jarod once called Argyle's friend his "toughest Pretend"; no 'forged papers or a fake id's required, 'just a lot of patience and no common sense'. Argyle has a pet dog he had simply named "Dog". Argyle's father, Benny, is a reverent fan of the Pope and Wayne Newton. His mother, Adelle, died a few years prior to the events of "Unsinkable".

=== Brigitte ===
(Pamela Gidley 1997–2000)

Originally a cleaner associated with Lyle, and hired along with him to help capture Jarod, Brigitte immediately became the bane of Miss Parker's worklife inside the Centre. To Miss Parker's further frustration, Brigitte was married to Mr. Parker in February 1999, later becoming pregnant and giving birth to a son in 2000 prior to her dying from a medical condition that caused her to bleed to death during the birth of her baby. After the gun that was used to shoot Matumbo, the leader of the Triumvirate, in Africa was planted on her body by Mr. Parker and Mr. Cox, Brigitte's body was then burnt in her cabin.

=== Broots ===
(Jon Gries, 1996–2000)

A computer genius, he works at the Centre with Miss Parker and Sydney to track down Jarod, and return him to the Centre. According to the episode, "Road Trip" (season four), when he was 12, Broots had the measles and had to be kept in quarantine in the hospital during that summer, and that he has a brother. Despite both the unsettling atmosphere of the Centre and unsavory nature of his work, Broots is a fairly hapless, yet emotionally stable individual, who while being somewhat lacking in actual relationships with women, is devoted to his daughter, Debbie, whom he raises alone. Despite the goings-on at the Centre, he 'sold [his] soul' to work there, and continues to work there, all for Debbie's sake. He is divorced from Debbie's mother, who is a gambling addict, and has sole custody of Debbie as of the events of "Past Sim" in season two. Despite her outward contempt for him, Miss Parker does have a certain respect for Broots (she will allow nobody but herself to abuse him), especially after he stands up to her in the season-one episode "Bomb Squad". To his surprise, he has worked with Jarod three times: to find the missing Miss Parker and Sydney (season one: "Jaroldo"), to repay Jarod for helping him gain custody of his daughter (season two: "Past Sim"), and to stop Damien when Broots was on the run after having witnessed Damien's slaughter of the personnel at a Centre information annex (season three: "Betrayal", in which both Jarod and he admit to having respect for each other).

=== Emily ===
(Marisa Petroro, 1997, 2000)

Younger sister to Jarod and Kyle and older half-sister to Ethan, she is constantly on the run from the Centre and searching for her brothers. Emily is alluded to as a Pretender like her brothers. According to "The World's Changing", (season four), Emily "adores yellow tulips, she hates cruelty to animals, she's smart, she's funny, she's tortured by the tragedies of her family", and that she has a little tattoo.

=== Ethan ===
(Tyler Christopher, 2000–2001) {appeared in series finale episode and The Pretender 2001}

Jarod and Miss Parker's half-brother, Ethan's birth parents are Catherine Parker and Major Charles. He was conceived when Catherine Parker was artificially inseminated unbeknownst to her when she was sedated during an operation. She was told about her pregnancy by Raines and that it had been done on her husband's orders, looking to cultivate an individual with both Catherine Parker's "inner sense", (a form of sixth sense), and the rare Pretender genealogy from Major Charles; due to this heritage, Ethan is referred to as Project Mirage. His mother, Catherine, was murdered by Raines minutes after he was born. He was taken and given to a couple named Clausen, who were under the control of Mr. Raines, who tries to turn him against his inner sense to manipulate and control him.

=== Gemini ===
(Ryan Merriman, 1999)

Jeremy, a 14-year-old clone of Jarod, is younger by about 20 years. He was the result of the project called Gemini, and is on the run with Jarod's father, Major Charles.

=== Jacob ===
(Dan Cashman, 1996–1998) {stand-in, appeared in three episodes}
(Alex Wexo, 1996–2000) {portrayed Young Jacob} {appeared in 17 episodes}
(Patrick Bauchau, 1996–2000) {appeared in three episodes}

A deceased twin brother to Sydney, he was once a "special expediter" at the Centre. He was who signed off on the paperwork that transferred Jarod to the custody of the Centre, but Mr. Fenigor was who actually had Jarod abducted. Jacob was put into a near-permanent coma after he attempted to complain about his duties at the Centre. He revived briefly on two occasions, and survived an assassination attempt by the Centre in 1967, but eventually died of a brain-infesting virus in 1998.

=== Major Charles ===
(George Lazenby, 1999, 2000) {appeared in four episodes}

Only known as Major Charles, once referred to as Charles ("Dragon House"). Whether this is his first or last name is unknown. He is the father of two sons, Jarod and Kyle, who were both abducted by the Centre, and a daughter named Emily, who was born after the boys were kidnapped. In addition, he is the father of Ethan by Catherine Parker, although he is unaware of this fact. He is married to Margaret, and was once a pilot for the Air Force.

=== Margaret ===
(Kim Myers, 1996–1999) (appeared in 9 episodes, also appeared in Pretender: Island of the Haunted)

Only known as Margaret, she is the mother of two sons Jarod and Kyle, who were both abducted by the Centre, and a daughter named Emily, who was born after the boys were kidnapped. She is married to Major Charles. She is on the run from the Centre and is looking for her family.

=== Catherine E. Parker ===
(Andrea Parker, 1996–2000)

Catherine E. Jamieson was a Roman Catholic who spent some time in a convent before marrying Mr. Parker, the head of the Centre. Catherine Parker and Mr. Parker have twins, a boy and a girl. Catherine is told later that her young son died, but in fact he grows up to become the operative Mr. Lyle. Catherine's daughter is raised by the Centre and eventually grows up to be the operative known only as "Miss Parker". Catherine is said to possess an "inner sense" shared by a select few. This extrasensory ability involves her hearing voices at times that guide her and help her in different situations.

Catherine Parker is more moral than her husband and attempts to rescue some of the Pretender Project children. She also adopts a young girl named Faith, who is dying of leukemia. Later on, Catherine becomes the subject of Project Mirage, wherein she is impregnated with the sperm of Major Charles, father of the Pretender named Jarod. The result of this is a boy named Ethan, half-brother to Jarod and Miss Parker. For reasons unclear, Catherine Parker places her trust in Mr. Raines when she is pregnant again, despite disagreeing with his amoral attitude towards the Pretender children. Raines delivers Catherine's baby Ethan, then executes her minutes later. The young Miss Parker is told that her mother died by suicide and Raines has Catherine's remains cremated. The adopted daughter Faith dies soon afterward. Miss Parker grows up to be the spitting image of her mother. As an adult, Miss Parker learns from Jarod, and then confirms it through further investigation, that she has been lied to about the nature of her mother's death.

=== Sam ===
(Sam Ayers, 1996–2000) {appeared in 33 episodes plus The Pretender: Island of the Haunted}

A sweeper of The Centre, he is loyal to Miss Parker.

=== Willie ===
(Willie Gault, 1997–2000) {appeared in 17 episodes plus The Pretender: Island of the Haunted}

A sweeper of the Centre, he is loyal to Mr. Raines.

=== Thomas Gates ===
(Jason Brooks, 1999–2000) {appeared in eight episodes}

Miss Parker's boyfriend, he is only person to make her happy since the death of her mother. She was planning on leaving the Centre with him for Oregon when he was murdered by someone within the Centre because she was "losing her focus". The murderer turned out to be Brigitte, but is hinted to have been on the orders of Mr. Parker.

=== Zoe ===
A love interest of Jarod's, she appears in several episodes. Actress : Lisa Cerasoli

== Other ==
=== Onyssius ===
In the franchise, the second motivating factor in Jarod's life is atoning for the deaths he inadvertently caused by working for The Centre; because of this, he identifies himself with Onyssius. According to Miss Parker, Onyssius is the Ancient Greek God of Retribution, (mentioned in the pilot episode, the first of the two The Pretender telemovies, The Pretender 2001, and the first book of the renewed series, The Pretender: Rebirth). Onyssius is identified as an angelic-winged figure with bent wings, and that he "defends the weak and abused".

NOTE: Onyssius is an original deity unique to the franchise, and not a deity that appears in real-life Classical Greco-Roman mythology. The spelling for his name is revealed in the first book, The Pretender: Rebirth, and is not to be mixed-up with Odysseus', the hero of Homer's classics, the Iliad and the Odyssey; OR with Nemesis/Invidia, the Classical Greco-Roman goddess of divine retribution.
