= List of The Pretender episodes =

The following is a list of episodes for the NBC television series The Pretender. The series ran for four seasons from 1996 through 2000, with 86 episodes produced, plus two television film sequels that aired on TNT in 2001.

== Series overview ==
Season	Episodes	Originally released		
Season	Episodes	First released	Last released	Network
1	22	September 19, 1996	May 17, 1997	NBC
2	22	November 1, 1997	May 16, 1998	NBC
3	22	October 17, 1998	May 22, 1999	NBC
4	20	September 25, 1999	May 13, 2000	NBC
Television films		January 22, 2001	December 10, 2001	TNT

== Episodes ==
=== Season 1 (1996–97) ===
No. overall	No. in season	Title	Directed by	Written by	Original release date
1	1	"Pilot"	Rick Wallace	Steven Long Mitchell & Craig W. Van Sickle	September 19, 1996
Jarod pretends to be a doctor to avenge a boy crippled by faulty surgery. Having just missed Jarod on a tanker ship in Alaska, Miss Parker and Sydney track him to a hospital where he plans on exposing the alcoholic surgeon who crippled the boy. Jarod discovers ice cream, Wheel of Fortune, and Pez.
2	2	"Every Picture Tells a Story"	Michael Zinberg	Steven Long Mitchell & Craig W. Van Sickle	September 28, 1996
Jarod joins the U.S. Coast Guard to avenge a drowned man who could have been rescued. Jarod discovers fake dog poop, other novelty items, and Oreo cookies.
3	3	"Flyer"	James Whitmore, Jr.	Juan Carlos Coto	October 19, 1996
Jarod pretends to be a test pilot to avenge another's "accidental" death. Jarod discovers Silly Putty.
4	4	"Curious Jarod"	Jesús Salvador Treviño	Kimberly Costello	October 26, 1996
Jarod becomes the head of security at a Las Vegas casino to expose an abusive murderer. Jarod discovers Curious George and Barrel of Monkeys.
5	5	"The Paper Clock"	Gabrielle Beaumont	Javier Grillo-Marxuach	November 2, 1996
Jarod becomes an attorney to help a man wrongly convicted of murder and receives the first picture of his mother from Sidney. Jarod discovers Rubik's Cube.
6	6	"To Protect and Serve"	James Whitmore, Jr.	Tommy Thompson	November 9, 1996
Jarod becomes a police officer to catch some corrupt colleagues who framed and murdered a security guard recently reunited with his long-lost father. Miss Parker prevents Jarod from acquiring information about his mother. Jarod discovers donuts and donut holes.
7	7	"A Virus Among Us"	Fred K. Keller	Lawrence Meyers	November 16, 1996
Jarod becomes a virologist to avenge the disappearance and death of another. Jarod discovers the bug motel and gives Miss Parker the flu. Sidney must face his own guilt about Jarod. This episode features the fictional "motaba" virus; the disease was originally used in the 1995 film Outbreak, and is classified as a Level Four pathogen both in the movie and in this episode.
8	8	"Not Even a Mouse"	Thomas J. Wright	Juan Carlos Coto	December 14, 1996
Jarod becomes a coroner to help expose the truth about the death of a caring homeless man, "Christmas" George, and also to discover the identity of a dead "LGL" ("Little Girl Lost"). Jarod discovers fruitcake and Christmas. Jarod becomes a part of Sidney's and Miss Parker's own Christmases.
9	9	"Mirage"	Ian Toynton	Tommy Thompson	January 4, 1997
Jarod infiltrates a Texan skydiving school to investigate one of the owners' death in the desert. Acting on a tip from Jarod, Miss Parker meets a man who knew her mother.
10	10	"The Better Part of Valor"	Anson Williams	Javier Grillo-Marxuach	January 11, 1997
Jarod is a firefighter to avenge the death of another by arson. The empath Angelo is introduced to help find Jarod. Jarod discovers Instant Cheeze. Miss Parker's private life begins to take precedence over her hunt for Jarod when she runs into a visiting old friend (Anthony Starke), and begins an affair with him.
11	11	"Bomb Squad"	Terrence O'Hara	Javier Grillo-Marxuach	January 18, 1997
Jarod is a member of a bomb squad trying to catch a serial bomber. Jarod discovers Mr. Potato Head. Mr. Raines hunt for the leak within the Center, making Miss Parker, Sidney, and Broots suspect each other.
12	12	"Prison Story"	Oscar L. Costo	Story by : Steven Long Mitchell & Craig W. Van Sickle and Tommy Thompson; Teleplay by : Steven Long Mitchell & Craig W. Van Sickle	February 1, 1997
Jarod impersonates a prison guard to help an innocent man about to be executed. Jarod discovers Slinky. The stress of chasing Jarod catches up with Miss Parker, as she discovers she has an ulcer.
13	13	"Bazooka Jarod"	James Whitmore, Jr.	Story by : Kimberly Costello & Juan Carlos Coto; Teleplay by : Juan Carlos Coto	February 8, 1997
Jarod becomes a U.S. Navy officer to expose a crewman's accidental death as murder. Jarod discovers Bazooka chewing gum. Following a lead among her mother's things, Miss Parker discovers her mother saved children from The Centre.
14	14	"Ranger Jarod"	Ian Toynton	Steven Long Mitchell & Craig W. Van Sickle	February 15, 1997
On impulse, Jarod joins the search to find a missing person in a mountainous forest region - and falls in love with a fellow volunteer. Jarod discovers The Three Stooges, Star Wars, and has his first sexual relationship.
15	15	"Jaroldo!"	Terrence O'Hara	Lawrence Meyers	March 8, 1997
Jarod becomes a news cameraman to avenge a shot predecessor. Jarod learns about basketball. Trapped together in an abandoned building about to be demolished, Miss Parker and a wounded Sydney bond while Broots frantically searches for them.
16	16	"Under the Reds"	Charles Siebert	Story by : David Kemper; Teleplay by : Javier Grillo-Marxuach & Lawrence Meyers	March 22, 1997
Jarod becomes an EMT, and creates a formula to help two coma victims – a young wrestler and Sydney's twin brother, Jacob. Miss Parker is shocked to discover Sydney has a twin brother, and tricks the center to save him. "SL-27" is first mentioned. Jarod discovers the lucky rabbit's foot.
17	17	"Keys"	Terrence O'Hara	Story by : Steven Long Mitchell & Craig W. Van Sickle; Teleplay by : Juan Carlos Coto	April 5, 1997
While trying to help a girl orphaned by the man smuggling her into the country, Jarod puts himself into the path of a strong hurricane. His plans are derailed when Miss Parker corners him in the hotel, and the man he was trying to punish escapes his trap.
18	18	"Unhappy Landings"	James Whitmore, Jr.	Story by : Terri Treas & Michael Zand; Teleplay by : Juan Carlos Coto & Javier Grillo-Marxuach & Lawrence Meyers	April 26, 1997
Jarod becomes a U.S. Marshal to help a witness in an illegal drug trade case. The Centre's other Pretender, Kyle, is introduced. Jarod discovers Spam.
19	19	"Jarod's Honor"	Terrence O'Hara	Tommy Thompson & Chris Ruppenthal	May 3, 1997
Jared and Sydney get emails from one another giving them clues to their past. In New Orleans, Jarod discovers a dying hitman, and assumes his identity to save an estranged couple from the rival club owner who put the hit out on them. In Minneapolis, Sydney – traveling with Miss Parker, who is trying to quit cigarettes – learns some startling facts about his twin brother, Jacob, and the circumstances surrounding his coma.
20	20	"Baby Love"	Joe Napolitano	Debra Pratt	May 10, 1997
While hiding from pursuit, Jarod witnesses a baby being abandoned and goes after the corrupt politician and detective responsible for the attempted murder of both mother and son. Meanwhile Ms. Parker, Sydney and Broots figure out what SL-27 is — a secret level of The Centre, that's been abandoned and sealed off after a fire. Sydney and Miss Parker — who've been led to believe that Jarod and Kyle didn't have parents, just as other children the Centre had taken in — discover that Jarod was kidnapped by Sydney's twin brother, Jacob.
21	21	"The Dragon House"	Fred K. Keller	Steven Long Mitchell & Craig W. Van Sickle	May 17, 1997
22	22	"The Dragon House"	Fred K. Keller	Steven Long Mitchell & Craig W. Van Sickle	May 17, 1997
While posing as a dentist (where he discovers Highlights Magazine), Jarod learns the fate of another Pretender, Kyle (Jeffrey Donovan), once his friend. Kyle is now an escaped prisoner, sentenced for kidnapping a woman. Jarod impersonates an FBI agent to join in the pursuit. After saving the woman from Kyle, who is taken by Miss Parker and The Centre, she tells Jarod their connection: he and Kyle are actually brothers. They were kidnapped by The Centre as children, and Miss Parker's mother – an old friend of the woman's from a convent – brought their parents to hide in the woman's farmhouse; they have a younger sister, Emily, who was born after their kidnapping. Jarod rescues Kyle from the Centre, where Dr. Raines was going to lobotomize him; this leads Miss Parker to convince her father about Raines' increasing instability. The woman arranges a short meeting between Jarod and his mother and sister. However, the Centre intercepts the plans, and Jarod only gets a glimpse of his mother and sister before Centre sweepers interrupt. Raines corners Jarod in an alley, but before he can shoot him, his oxygen tank is shot and explodes, engulfing him in flames. A ballistics report comes back inconclusive, meaning Sydney, Miss Parker and Broots are all suspects.

=== Season 2 (1997–98) ===
No. overall	No. in season	Title	Directed by	Written by	Original release date	Prod. code
23	1	"Back from the Dead Again"	James Whitmore, Jr.	Steven Long Mitchell & Craig W. Van Sickle	November 1, 1997	03201
A month after the events of the first season finale, Mr. Parker goes missing, and is replaced by the mysterious Mr. Lyle and his assistant, Brigitte. Mr. Lyle questions Miss Parker's handling of Jarod's capture, infuriating her on top of her worry for her father. Meanwhile, Jarod becomes an anatomy professor to help a man discover what really happened to his missing brother. He discovers Halloween, and tries to uncover a missing portion of his time at the Centre. For Halloween, Jarod goes trick or treating dressed as the scariest person he knows – Raines.
24	2	"Scott Free"	Joe Napolitano	Story by : Juan Carlos Coto & Tommy Thompson; Teleplay by : Tommy Thompson	November 8, 1997	03202
Jarod impersonates a one-armed safe-cracker to help a man (Louis Ferreira) on parole trying to go straight and his young son (Drake Bell). Jarod discovers Wheel-O. Mr. Lyle and Brigitte interfere in Miss Parker's plans to capture Jarod, but ignore the trio's warnings of taking Jarod too lightly.
25	3	"Over the Edge"	James Whitmore, Jr.	Tony Blake & Paul Jackson	November 15, 1997	03203
Jarod investigates a supposed suicide attempt by a member of a search and rescue team. Jarod discovers Spider-Man. The Centre hires a forensic psychologist (Sam Anderson) to further investigate who shot at Mr. Raines, further fueling suspicions among Miss Parker, Sydney, and Broots. However, his results are mysteriously inconclusive.
26	4	"Exposed"	Jim Charleston	Tyler Bensinger	November 22, 1997	03204
Jarod becomes a fashion photographer to expose a stalker. Following clues left by Jarod, Miss Parker travels to Maine and meets again with the man who knew her mother, who reveals she used to stay with him every April – nine months before Miss Parker's January birthday.
27	5	"Nip and Tuck"	Michael Lange	Eric Morris	December 6, 1997	5P05
Jarod becomes a cosmetic surgeon to investigate why a young woman's face was disfigured during a routine procedure. Jarod discovers Play-Doh.
28	6	"Past Sim"	Fred K. Keller	Tommy Thompson	December 13, 1997	5P06
Jarod discovers that one of his last simulations has been exploited by Mr. Lyle to be used as the blueprint in the kidnapping of a witness against a Yakuza boss who killed her son. Posing as someone from the Department of Justice, Jarod sees her kidnapped by Centre sweepers, and contacts Sydney. Mr. Parker mysteriously returns, and Miss Parker is furious to discover Mr. Lyle is associating with organized crime. She teams with an equally furious Raines — already conspiring with her father behind her back — to try and pocket the payment, and pin the stolen funds on Mr. Lyle. This, plus Jarod's rescue of the witness, turns Mr. Lyle into a Yakuza target, forcing him to disappear from The Centre and go on the run.
29	7	"Collateral Damage"	Vern Gillum	Harry Dunn	January 3, 1998	5P07
Jarod becomes an Army Ranger to investigate the 25-year-old death of a Vietnam soldier whose daughter wants his name cleared of treason. Jarod discovers Jell-O. Broots wins full custody of his daughter from his ex-wife; but when he is called away to assignment, Miss Parker reluctantly agrees to babysit the girl. The experience begins to help her cope with some of the wounds around her mother's death, and open a gift given to her by her mother the day she died.
30	8	"Hazards"	Chuck Bowman	Story by : Steven Long Mitchell & Craig W. Van Sickle and Juan Carlos Coto; Teleplay by : Juan Carlos Coto	January 10, 1998	5P10
Jarod saves the life of a suicidal chemical engineer and then investigates the events behind the deaths of three of the man's co-workers in a chemical accident. Jarod discovers Twinkies. When a mysterious client visits the Centre, Sydney goes on the run. Miss Parker investigates, and discovers that Sydney is a Holocaust survivor; his family was killed, but he and Jacob were saved by the client – a doctor in the concentration camp – for experiments, since they were twins.
31	9	"F/X"	Vern Gillum	Story by : Steven Long Mitchell & Craig W. Van Sickle; Teleplay by : Harry Dunn	January 17, 1998	5P09
Jarod becomes a special effects coordinator to learn the truth about an explosion that injured a stunt driver. Jarod discovers model cars. Jarod sends Miss Parker a tape from the day her mother died, in which she talks with a Dr. Fenigor about her saving Jarod and another boy named Timmy, who was mysteriously discharged the day after the death of Miss Parker's mother. The trio discover that Timmy is actually Angelo, whose mind was destroyed by an experiment of Raines witnessed in horror by Miss Parker's mother.
32	10	"Indy Show"	Chuck Bowman	Story by : Steven Long Mitchell & Tommy Thompson & Craig W. Van Sickle & Eric Morris; Teleplay by : Tommy Thompson	January 31, 1998	5P12
Jarod becomes a race-car driver to learn about a crash that injured another racer. Jacob awakens from his coma, but he's dying from a virus. Sydney and Miss Parker sneak away from the Centre to a cabin Sydney owns to try and get answers about both the death of Miss Parker's mother, and his involvement in Jarod and Kyle's kidnapping. Before Jacob dies he gives Sydney a paper reading "GENE" in reference to Jarod. Sydney confesses to him he was the one who shot Raines. Mario Andretti appears in a cameo as himself.
33	11	"Gigolo Jarod"	Rodney Charters	Tyler Bensinger	February 7, 1998	5P11
Jarod becomes an escort, uncovers a wealthy woman's past, learns the truth about a boy's death, and reconnects an estranged couple. Jarod discovers St. Valentine's Day.
34	12	"Toy Surprise"	Fred K. Keller	Juan Carlos Coto	March 7, 1998	5P08
Jarod becomes counselor to a boy who saw his best friend die. On the anniversary of the death of Miss Parker's mother, Jarod warns her of a planned assassination of her father. She, Sydney, Broots, and Raines become trapped in a sublevel of the Centre, and she and Broots must escape to stop the attempt. She discovers the assassin is Brigitte.
35	13	"A Stand Up Guy"	Michael Lange	Tony Blake & Paul Jackson	March 14, 1998	5P13
Jarod becomes a counterfeiter working with the mob in order to learn the facts about an undercover FBI agent's murder. Miss Parker is assigned by her father to become a "cleaner" again when Mr. Lyle reemerges robbing and murdering workers at a Centre office. Upon a confrontation with him, Miss Parker shoots Mr. Lyle and he plunges into a river; however, his body is not recovered.
36	14	"Amnesia"	Steven Long Mitchell	Steven Long Mitchell & Craig W. Van Sickle	March 21, 1998	5P14
Primarily an episode consisting of clips from past episodes. When Jarod miscalculates a pretend, and is mugged and left to die, he's rescued by an unstable con artist (Leland Orser) and develops amnesia while recovering. Miss Parker, Broots, and Sydney are forcibly dragged into the Centre by Raines and Brigitte, who are convinced one of them is working with Jarod to elude capture. They hold the trio for heavy questioning, where each of them recalls memories of him. As Jarod regains his memory, his rescuer plans to turn him into the Centre. However, by the time Brigitte and her team go to capture him, Jarod has escaped once again.
37	15	"Bulletproof"	Fred K. Keller	Mark M. Dodson	March 28, 1998	5P15
Jarod becomes a SWAT officer to find the killer of a police lieutenant in a small town. Jarod discovers Chia Pets. When Sydney asks Broots to hunt down a woman named Michelle Luca, Miss Parker becomes suspicious, and works with Broots to find the woman. Their investigation reveals that Michelle was once a Centre employee who worked with Sydney, but disappeared. Sydney received a birth certificate from Jarod with the father's name left blank, leaving him to wonder if he is the father. Sydney visits Michelle (Leigh Taylor-Young), who confirms that Sydney is the father of her son. However, she has married, and they have raised the boy to believe her husband is his father. Nonetheless, she tells Sydney she does still love him.
38	16	"Silence"	Joe Napolitano	Denise Dobbs	April 4, 1998	5P16
Jarod becomes a DEA psychologist and tries to get a traumatized 5-year-old murder witness to speak out. Jarod discovers chocolate milk. Miss Parker and Sydney search for the identity of another subject of Dr. Raines' experiments who may be out to kill Raines.
39	17	"Crash"	Scott Lautanen	Tony Blake & Paul Jackson	April 11, 1998	5P17
Jarod becomes an NTSB investigator after learning that the young man whom he gave his ticket to has been killed in the crash of the flight he (Jarod) was supposed to have taken. Miss Parker, Sydney and Broots attend a high school reunion and discover some disquieting facts about Mr. Lyle's past.
40	18	"Stolen"	Scott Lautanen	Story by : Juan Carlos Coto & Ivan Tell; Teleplay by : Juan Carlos Coto	May 2, 1998	5P19
Jarod takes the place of a millionaire whose son has been kidnapped and subsequently remembers his own kidnapping. He is captured by Miss Parker, but in-fighting between her team and Mr. Raines' lets him get away.
41	19	"Red Rock Jarod"	Fred K. Keller	Tommy Thompson	May 2, 1998	5P18
Jarod is lured to a town in Arizona and is turned over to the still-living Mr. Lyle by two police officers - a man whose wife Mr. Lyle has buried alive in the desert and a woman whose son needs a heart transplant. Kyle is also revealed alive and the brothers rescue the buried woman, but Kyle takes a bullet for Jarod and is killed; his heart is donated to the boy. Guest Starring James Denton, Jeffrey Donovan, John Diehl, and Connie Ray.
42	20	"Bank"	Michael Lange	Harry Dunn	May 9, 1998	5P20
Jarod summons Miss Parker to meet him at a bank, and confront Mr. Fennigor to give the two information on their pasts. However, the plan is foiled when the two become hostages in a bank robbery. Having broken into Mr. Parker's home, Jarod gives Miss Parker letters written to her by her mother; the letters reveal Catherine was planning on taking Miss Parker and leaving The Centre. After learning Jarod, Miss Parker, and Fennigor are in the bank, Mr. Parker and Raines assemble a team to capture Jarod and assassinate Fennigor. Fennigor is shot by one of the robbers when he tries to escape; Jarod and Miss Parker discover The Centre has been secretly paying him to hide and keep quiet. Sydney and Broots attempt to prevent The Centre from assassinating Fennigor and Jarod. Fennigor tells Jarod and Miss Parker the information she's looking for is in the "Prodigy Red Files"; he also gives Jarod an envelope of "where he came from." Following the ordeal, Miss Parker realizes that her father is deliberately deceiving her.
43	21	"Bloodlines"	Fred K. Keller	Steven Long Mitchell & Craig W. Van Sickle	May 16, 1998	5P21-5P22
44	22	"Bloodlines"	Fred K. Keller	Steven Long Mitchell & Craig W. Van Sickle	May 16, 1998	5P21-5P22
Jarod pretends to be a fertility doctor at NuGenesis, the address of a clinic that Fennigor gave him, and find information about his parents. From a janitor, Jarod discovers his parents went there as patients, and he was tested there to see if he was a prodigy. Sydney devises a treatment for Angelo that returns his mind, but removes his empathy/Pretender abilities. Angelo reveals Raines is planning on kidnapping another child to replace Jarod as a Pretender, and warns Jarod of the plan, who in turn warns Sydney. He, Miss Parker, and Broots discover that Raines is rebuilding Sublevel 27. While researching The Centre archives, Broots finds footage of Miss Parker's birth that reveals she had a stillborn twin brother; when she confronts her father, he admits that he hid it from her. At NuGenesis, the janitor leads Jarod to a room of red files; in Jarod's file is a tape of him being tested by Sydney. A clue also leads Jarod to a Lodge outside of town that Jarod's parents used to stay at visiting the clinic. Angelo escapes The Centre, and leads Jarod to a local elementary school where The Centre is planning on kidnapping a little boy. Jarod discovers NuGenesis is affiliated with The Centre, and leads them to the boy; he also discovers that something in a person's genes can predispose them to be a Pretender. Broots also finds extended footage of the birth, which reveals the baby boy was not stillborn, and Raines calling to have the boy sent to NuGenesis, which was then also an adoption agency. Jarod fails to prevent the kidnapping of the boy, and plots to rescue him from a Centre safehouse. After the rescue, he tries to develop a serum similar to Angelo's to help reverse the damage The Centre has already inflicted on the child. Miss Parker confronts her father about her twin brother being sent away and adopted. To her surprise, he knows nothing about this (as he was out of town for the birth), meaning that Raines lied to the Parkers. Miss Parker follows Jarod from the clinic to the home, where he has narrowed down her twin to two possible candidates: Angelo or Mr. Lyle. Miss Parker accidentally causes the serum Jarod created to be destroyed; Angelo willingly gives his last treatment to the boy. This causes Angelo to regress to his former self permanently. However, Miss Parker is able to discover that Angelo saw her mother murdered, and Fennigor knows the culprit. Miss Parker ushers a plane to bring Jarod, Angelo, and the boy to The Centre. However, Angelo stalls Miss Parker and the other agents so Jarod can save the little boy; he brings him to a couple that was seeing him for treatment. Feeling guilty for not stopping Raines, Sydney creates a bomb to destroy SL-27. Miss Parker and Jarod, who has snuck back into The Centre, see Fennigor, who reveals who killed Miss Parker's mother – Jarod's father. Jarod is chased by a furious Miss Parker shooting at him, while The Centre is alerted. He's cornered by Miss Parker, Sydney, Broots, Raines, and Mr. Parker in SL-27, as the bomb explodes.

=== Season 3 (1998–99) ===
No. overall	No. in season	Title	Directed by	Written by	Original release date
45	1	"Crazy"	Fred K. Keller	Story by : Steven Long Mitchell & Craig W. Van Sickle and Lawrence Meyers; Teleplay by : Steven Long Mitchell & Craig W. Van Sickle	October 17, 1998
Two weeks following the explosion, Sydney is presumed dead — vilified by Mr. Parker — and Jarod seems to have suffered a mental breakdown. He has been admitted to an asylum after destroying a Centre office. But is his breakdown real, or is there an ulterior motive? After the final remains in the explosion are not determined to be Sydney's, and learning Raines has been spending most of his time in the Renewal wing — mostly for "headcases and invalids" — Miss Parker investigates, and finds that a temporarily blinded Sydney has been trapped there for "reeducation." Mr. Parker has been forced to place a new member on Miss Parker's team, and she is unhappy with the decision – Mr. Lyle. She is further infuriated when DNA testing reveals Mr. Lyle to be her long-lost twin brother – knowledge already known by Mr. Parker.
46	2	"Hope and Prey"	David Jackson	Juan Carlos Coto	October 24, 1998
Jarod becomes a bounty hunter while searching for info about his father. Both he and Miss Parker discover stylized rings of fire in relation to Jarod's father.
47	3	"Once in a Blue Moon"	Chuck Bowman	Andrew Dettmann & Daniel Truly	October 31, 1998
Jarod becomes a criminal profiler when he discovers a young woman's kidnapping is exactly the same as one he helped investigate while at The Centre- the murder of Mr. Raines' daughter, Annie.
48	4	"Someone to Trust"	Fred K. Keller	Tommy Thompson	November 7, 1998
Jarod becomes an arsonist and befriends his employer's wife, who later tries to frame him for her husband's death in order to claim the estate. Miss Parker and Broots investigate after discovering from Jarod that Mr. Lyle had a mail-order bride in Las Vegas — and that he or Mr. Parker may be involved in her brutal murder.
49	5	"Betrayal"	Terrence O'Hara	Mark M. Dodson	November 14, 1998
When information on some of Jarod's old simulations is stolen and used to kill and the personnel at a Centre info annex are massacred, Broots is targeted for knowing too much. He must team up with Jarod to stop an ex-operative who had a lot to do with Jarod's eventual escape. Jarod ends up shooting and killing the man.
50	6	"Parole"	Fred K. Keller	Tommy Thompson	November 21, 1998
Jarod becomes a parolee to stop a parole officer who is using ex-cons to do home invasions. Sydney is reunited with his son as his old love's husband is dying.
51	7	"Homefront"	Michael Zinberg	Guy Zimmerman	December 12, 1998
Jarod becomes a black market arms dealer in order to reunite two children with their mother.
52	8	"Flesh and Blood"	Rodney Charters	Harry Dunn	January 2, 1999
Jarod becomes an ATF agent and tries to rescue Sydney's son and three others who are taken hostage by an Appalachian militia group, but Mr. Lyle isn't far behind.
53	9	"Murder 101"	Scott Lautanen	Andrew Dettmann & Daniel Truly	January 9, 1999
Jarod becomes a psychology professor and must deal with a group of brilliant but arrogant students in order to learn what happened to his predecessor.
54	10	"Mr. Lee"	Steven Long Mitchell	Mark M. Dodson	February 6, 1999
The Centre finds that it may be competing for Jarod's capture with a blind Chinese man who claims he can predict Jarod's next move by speaking to seven people who have come into contact with him. James Hong guest stars.
55	11	"The Assassin"	Michael Lange	Tommy Thompson	February 6, 1999
Jarod helps a woman whose children have been abducted, and Miss Parker is attracted to a stranger.
56	12	"Unsinkable"	Chuck Bowman	Juan Carlos Coto	February 13, 1999
Bound in chains and thrown off a pier, Jarod recalls the Atlantic City events that led to his current predicament - courtesy of Argyle from Season 2's "Unforgotten".
57	13	"Pool"	Fred K. Keller	Harry Dunn	February 20, 1999
Jarod becomes a pool shark in order to help a young singer, Billie (Jennifer Garner), and to settle a score with a wealthy bigot.
58	14	"At the Hour of Our Death"	Steven Long Mitchell	Mark M. Dodson	February 27, 1999
Jarod and Miss Parker each face simultaneous life-threatening experiences: Jarod is seriously injured in a plane crash and Miss Parker is rushed to the ER when her stomach ulcer perforates ... but both remember an incident from their childhood at The Centre involving a dying girl named Faith.
59	15	"Countdown"	Chuck Bowman	Andrew Dettmann & Daniel Truly	March 20, 1999
Jarod goes to a Mexican prison to arrange for an inmate to donate a kidney to a son he didn't know existed.
60	16	"P.T.B."	Krishna Rao	Juan Carlos Coto	April 3, 1999
Jarod tries to help a radio talk-show host (Bryan Cranston) who's on the run from a mysterious stalker. Miss Parker must decide whether or not to leave The Centre and join Thomas, who is moving to Oregon.
61	17	"Ties That Bind"	Fred K. Keller	Dave Alan Johnson	April 10, 1999
While returning a boy to his father, Jarod witnesses the yacht he and his father live on explode, and one of the detectives being paid off by two men. Discovering a law firm is tied to the boy's father, Jarod investigates and discovers the father was an informant set to testify against one of the law firm's attorneys. Meanwhile, Miss Parker is hesitant to tell her father she wants to leave The Centre and move to Oregon with Thomas.
62	18	"Wake Up"	Michael J. Klick	Tommy Thompson	May 1, 1999
Shortly after the events of the last episode, Miss Parker awakens to find Thomas murdered on the front porch. Devastated, she throws herself - and Broots and Sydney - into investigating who did it. With some help from Jarod - whom she surprisingly agrees to meet with face-to-face in a diner - she is able to trace the case to a seedy local car garage. However, the investigation is stalled when her star suspect is found dead in an apparent suicide, and her father instructs a Centre sweeper team to "clean it up." On a phone call with Jarod, Miss Parker vows she will wait a bit before discovering who at The Centre is responsible and avenging his death.
63	19	"End Game"	James Whitmore, Jr.	Juan Carlos Coto	May 8, 1999
While pretending to be a police detective, Jarod receives a case about a missing teenage chess prodigy Bryce Banks (Emile Hirsch) that reminds him of his own kidnapping by The Centre. FBI profiler Samantha Waters (Ally Walker) arrives, believing the case is connected to eight unsolved cases from the 1980s, also featuring teenage chess experts with some similarities, like frayed paternal relationships; six of the boys were found murdered, while two remain missing. Upon finding the kidnapper's hideout, the team discovers the two boys are still alive, having been kidnapped and brainwashed by a man they call "Father", and being renamed "Joshua". Bryce is rescued and returned to his family. Meanwhile, Miss Parker is asked by her father to investigate Brigitte's strange behavior. Miss Parker witnesses her taking injections, leading her to believe she is a drug addict. Investigating on Miss Parker's orders, Broots discovers her and Lyle together. Further testing on Brigitte's syringe reveals she was taking fertility drugs. Mr. Parker reveals Brigitte is pregnant, stunning Miss Parker. This episode begins a crossover with Profiler that concludes on "Grand Master".
64	20	"Qallupilluit"	Rodney Charters	Mark M. Dodson	May 22, 1999
Jarod becomes a climatologist and journeys to an arctic research station to find his father, unaware that it's operated by The Centre.
65	21	"Donoterase"	Fred K. Keller	Steven Long Mitchell & Craig W. Van Sickle	May 22, 1999
66	22	"Donoterase"	Fred K. Keller	Steven Long Mitchell & Craig W. Van Sickle	May 22, 1999
Jarod and his father (George Lazenby) are finally reunited, but assassins from The Centre are on their trail. Jarod and his father later team up to rescue the clone created by the Centre's "Project Gemini," and Miss Parker learns more about her mother's murder. Raines plans on assassinating Mr. Parker, but Miss Parker catches the bullet for him, leading to Brigitte capturing Jarod.

=== Season 4 (1999–2000) ===
No. overall	No. in season	Title	Directed by	Written by	Original release date
67	1	"The World's Changing"	James Whitmore, Jr.	Steven Long Mitchell & Craig W. Van Sickle	September 25, 1999
Jarod is recaptured by The Centre, who plan to transfer him to Africa. However, on the way, Jarod hijacks the plane, and discovers a mysterious new Centre adversary (Tobin Bell) is involved in a Centre plot to kill two nuclear researchers and a daughter in a plane crash. He joins the Department of Energy to help save them. Mr. Parker places Brigitte in hiding, and goes on the run. This places Mr. Lyle in charge at The Centre, who adds a new member on the team to recapture Jarod — a very alive Raines, who seems to have undergone a religious conversion. Miss Parker recovers at a hospital mysteriously placed under suicide watch.
68	2	"Survival"	Terrence O'Hara	Mark M. Dodson	October 2, 1999
Jarod becomes an investigator in the army investigating a soldier's supposed suicide during isolation training. Miss Parker and Mr. Lyle are contained elsewhere.
69	3	"Angel's Flight"	Chuck Bowman	Tommy Thompson	October 30, 1999
Jarod becomes a San Francisco police detective to find a missing teen. Miss Parker is suspicious of Centre newcomer Mr. Cox (Lenny Von Dohlen).
70	4	"Risque Business"	Terrence O'Hara	Andrew Dettmann & Daniel Truly	November 6, 1999
Jarod becomes a sex therapist and tries to investigate the circumstances surrounding an attack on a female therapist.
71	5	"Road Trip"	Fred K. Keller	Andrew Dettmann & Daniel Truly	November 13, 1999
Jarod befriends a woman named Zoe (Lisa Cerasoli) on the run. During the trip, Jarod becomes a policeman and an aerospace engineer to help Zoe escape her abusive ex-boyfriend. In the process, the two fall heavily for each other. Having followed Jarod to his last pretend in Kansas, Miss Parker, Sydney, and Broots follow clues set up by Jarod in a Wizard of Oz-themed maze that lead them to childhood memories. For Broots, when he was almost killed by measles as a child; for Sydney, when he and Jacob returned to the ruins of their home after being liberated from the concentration camp; and for Miss Parker, a rare happy childhood memory when a snowstorm forced her family to be trapped together and bond.
72	6	"Extreme"	Scott Lautanen	Steven Long Mitchell & Craig W. Van Sickle	December 4, 1999
Jarod becomes an extreme sportsman and investigates the events that left a bungee jumper in a coma. While Lyle is out of town, Miss Parker, Sydney, and Broots use Jarod's Let's Make a Deal-esque clues to discover a disturbing secret about Lyle.
73	7	"Wild Child"	Michael J. Klick	Joel Metzger	December 11, 1999
Jarod becomes a psychiatrist to learn the identity of a feral child found in the forest, and the circumstances surrounding her ordeal. Miss Parker suspects Cox has been stalking her - and that he may have been sent to fulfill a contract hit on Mr. Parker's life.
74	8	"Rules of Engagement"	Rodney Charters	Ethan Lawrence	January 8, 2000
Jarod becomes an FBI hostage negotiator and deals with two brothers who have taken over a hospital. Miss Parker tries to help her father, who is in hiding. Jarod discovers the Tooth fairy.
75	9	"'Til Death Do Us Part"	Craig W. Van Sickle	Steven Long Mitchell & Craig W. Van Sickle	January 15, 2000
On the first anniversary of Thomas' murder, a grieving Miss Parker receives some unexpected help from Jarod to help catch his killer. Mr. Parker and Brigitte come back to Blue Cove just as Brigitte is about to give birth. After the death of a Triumvant leader, Mr. Cox intensifies his search for Mr. Parker. Through her investigation, Miss Parker discovers that Brigitte killed Thomas. When she goes to confront Brigitte at her cabin, she finds Brigitte in labor. Brigitte confesses to the killing, claiming that it was ordered from someone inside The Centre because he was "distracting" Miss Parker. She also confesses that she has a disorder that will cause her to bleed to death in childbirth. Miss Parker delivers the baby boy. Mr. Parker arrives, revealing Cox is not an adversary; he was only a part of his plan to return to The Centre, and get rid of the Triumvant leader, who tried to have Mr. Parker previously assassinated; he gives little thought to Brigitte's death or the baby. Mr. Parker and Cox place the gun used to kill the Triumvant leader with Brigitte, and set the cabin on fire.
76	10	"Spin Doctor"	Fred K. Keller	Juan Carlos Coto	February 5, 2000
Jarod becomes a secret service agent to investigate the death of a man who aided him in his initial escape from The Centre (Max Martini), in what appears to be a suicide covered up as murder. However, his investigation reunites him with the VCTF team - including new Profiler Rachel Burke (Jamie Luner), and Bailey Malone (Robert Davi), who recognizes Jarod and fields the same suspicion Sam Waters had in their encounter. Meanwhile, Sydney's strange behavior leads to Miss Parker and Broots discovering Sydney's involvement and guilt over a young woman's death. Simultaneously, Miss Parker looks for some stability in her life in the wake of the events of the previous few episodes. This episode begins a crossover with Profiler that concludes on "Clean Sweep".
77	11	"Cold Dick"	Steven Long Mitchell	Juan Carlos Coto	February 12, 2000
A parody of neo-noir films, Jarod pretends to be a sleazy private investigator in Las Vegas at the begging of Argyle. The two become involved in the case of a murdered man and a missing showgirl, with quirky characters. Having intercepted Argyle's email to Jarod, Ms. Parker and Broots arrive in Vegas early. Broots imagines the two having a secret affair. Wayne Newton and Kenneth Mars guest star.
78	12	"Lifeline"	Jon Koslowsky	Juan Carlos Coto	February 19, 2000
Jarod poses as the bodyguard of a gunworks owner/gangster (Peter Onorati) to help protect an ATF agent (Laura Cayouette) posing as his fiancée, and get her back to her daughter and father safely. Meanwhile, Miss Parker and Broots investigate Raines' religious conversion, and believe him to be planning to kill oxygen-dependent Baby Parker.
79	13	"Ghosts From the Past"	Michael T. Weiss	Mark M. Dodson	February 26, 2000
Jarod goes undercover to stop a white supremacist group in Georgia from destroying a local Unity rally organized by a black pastor (Thomas Mikal Ford). Angelo senses Jarod is in danger from a past villain, forcing the trio to try and figure out who it is.
80	14	"The Agent of Year Zero"	Rodney Charters	Story by : Tommy Thompson; Teleplay by : Drew Hammond & Tommy Thompson	March 11, 2000
Jarod becomes a Government agent and helps a visually impaired Cambodian woman who accidentally encounters the person responsible for the killing of her family.
81	15	"Junk"	Michael Zinberg	Harry Dunn	March 25, 2000
Jarod becomes a drug addict to help a mother who was once addicted and is now in rehab, but doesn't understand how she got there.
82	16	"School Daze"	Jon Gries	Andrew Dettmann & Daniel Truly	April 22, 2000
Jarod becomes a sixth-grade teacher to help a young murder witness. Miss Parker is reunited with a woman from her past.
83	17	"Meltdown"	Krishna Rao	Ethan Lawrence	April 29, 2000
Jarod becomes an agent with the TXBI and poses as a gang member to find a little girl's killer. Miss Parker tries to learn about a project concerning her late mother.
84	18	"Corn Man A Comin"	Steven Long Mitchell	Mark M. Dodson	May 6, 2000
After buying a camcorder at a pawn shop, Jarod tries to find the mother and daughter on the tape, which ends with them in peril, while Miss Parker keeps digging for the truth about her mother's murder – literally.
85	19	"The Inner Sense"	Fred K. Keller	Steven Long Mitchell & Craig W. Van Sickle	May 13, 2000
86	20	"The Inner Sense"	Fred K. Keller	Steven Long Mitchell & Craig W. Van Sickle	May 13, 2000
Jarod is contacted by his father, who tells him he has located his sister Emily as a reporter in Philadelphia; Emily has been looking for Jarod herself. When Jarod arrives to the newspaper offices, Emily has been pushed out of a window, seemingly by a stalker. Miss Parker goes to confront Mr. Lyle about their mother's empty grave, but stops short when she sees a memo to him from Mr. Parker regarding Project Mirage. Mr. Lyle attempts to stop Miss Parker from finding out more, while also looking for Emily after reading she is still alive. Realizing that Mr. Lyle is Emily's stalker, Jarod and Major Charles are able to rescue Emily from the hospital just as he and a team of Centre sweepers arrive. In her belongings, Jarod finds that she was following a young man she believed to be Jarod named Ethan. After discovering Raines did her mother's autopsy, Miss Parker and Broots trail him to a secret home in the country; Sydney attempts to convince Miss Parker to drop her investigation into Project Mirage to no avail. In Raines' secret home, Miss Parker and Broots find a disc documenting a discussion in the home between Raines and Catherine in June 1970 – meaning that Catherine was not killed in the elevator. An address given by Emily leads Jarod and Major Charles to Ethan's lair, where they discover he was creating a bomb. When Jarod and Major Charles arrive at the home of Ethan's parents, they've been murdered; Ethan arrives and believes Jarod shot them, but escapes as the police come. Major Charles hacks into the records of NuGenesis, and discovers the clinic sent some of his sperm samples to Raines' secret home. They search the home, and see that Raines had built a birthing room. After being confronted by Miss Parker, Sydney confesses he knew Catherine had not died that day; she had told him in their final therapy session of her plan to fake her death, after discovering someone close was planning on murdering her. As Jarod searches the home, Miss Parker sees another clip from the found footage of Catherine talking with Jarod inside the home. The two parties draw the same conclusion: Catherine had another baby, with the father being Major Charles; Jarod deduces the baby is Ethan, who has now been taken in by Raines. Miss Parker confronts Jarod on the phone, but he doesn't remember being at the home or talking with Catherine. The investigation is further complicated when the end of the clip is of Catherine unplugging the security camera to talk with Jarod privately. Miss Parker and Jarod separately follow Raines and Ethan to a meeting for the final parts to make the bomb. Jarod tries to assure Ethan he didn't kill his parents, but he fails. Miss Parker manages to capture him; instead of bringing him to The Centre, she, Sydney, and Broots interrogate him about his meeting with Catherine Parker. A hypnosis session helps Jarod remember his conversation with Catherine: she was impregnated with Major Charles' sperm unknowingly during a surgical procedure ordered by Mr. Parker; the baby would have both Catherine/Miss Parker's "inner sense", as well as Jarod's Pretender abilities. Catherine believed she would die, and wanted Jarod to tell Miss Parker to "complete her plan." Broots intercepts communication between Raines and The Triumvante okaying Project Mirage; the success of the plan would allow Raines to take over The Centre from the Parkers. Mr. Lyle feigns interest in joining the plan to double-cross him, with Mr. Parker imprisoning him. Sydney shows Miss Parker footage of Raines killing Catherine after Ethan's birth, after which Miss Parker confronts him in his cell. Raines reveals Ethan will detonate the bomb in a Washington, D.C. subway; as he's about to reveal the person who knows the "whole truth" of Catherine's plan, Mr. Parker shoots him. Mr. Lyle and Mr. Cox kidnap Zoe to distract Jarod from interfering with the project. The two expect Jarod to save her, but she's saved by Major Charles, who attacks the team and brings her to safety. Jarod arrives to confront Ethan on the train, and sways him to help. However, the train and the bomb can't be stopped, as the bomb is on the undercarriage. Jarod is able to redirect the train away from a busy station to an abandoned one. Miss Parker emerges as they try to leave, and the three race to jump off the train before it explodes.

== Television films (2001) ==
Title	Directed by	Written by	Original release date
The Pretender 2001	Fred K. Keller	Steven Long Mitchell & Craig W. Van Sickle	January 22, 2001
The Pretender: Island of the Haunted	Fred K. Keller	Steven Long Mitchell & Craig W. Van Sickle	December 10, 2001
