= Jamie Sue Weiss =

American make-up artist

- Born: United States
- Other names: Jamie S. Weiss; Jamie Weiss

Jamie Sue Weiss is a make-up artist in television and films. She is the older sister to actor Michael T. Weiss.

== Filmography - Make-Up Department ==
=== Film ===
- Net Worth (2000) (key makeup artist)
- While You Were Sleeping (1995) (makeup artist) (uncredited)
- Miracle on 34th Street (1994) (makeup artist)
- Uncle Buck (1989) (additional makeup artist)

=== Television ===
- ER (1994) TV Series (key makeup artist: Chicago)
- Chicago Hope (1994) TV Series (key makeup artist: Chicago)
