= Andy Sandberg =

American comedian, director, and actor

Andy Sandberg is an American director, writer, actor, and producer. A 2005 graduate of Yale College, his Off-Broadway directing credits include Straight, Application Pending (also author), Shida, Craving for Travel (also author), Operation Epsilon, and The Last Smoker in America. He is also known as a producer of the Broadway (2009) and West End (2010) revivals of the musical Hair (2009 Tony Award).

== Early life and education ==
Sandberg began acting in school productions as a child. He graduated from the Browning School in 2001 and Yale College in 2005 with a B.A. in English (Writing Concentration) and Theater Studies. While at Yale, Sandberg performed with and served as the business manager for the Whiffenpoofs and the Yale Alley Cats. At Yale, he performed in and/or directed over 30 productions including Side Show, Parade, The Laramie Project, Songs for a New World, The Last Five Years and The Goat or Who is Sylvia?

== Career ==
=== Director and writer ===
He directed the Off-Broadway show Straight, which was named a Critics’ Pick by The New York Times, which wrote that the production was “directed with polished finesse by Andy Sandberg.”

He directed the critically acclaimed Application Pending, a comedy about kindergarten admissions that he co-wrote with Greg Edwards (Westside Theatre; BroadwayWorld Award – Best Off-Broadway Play; Drama Desk Nomination – Outstanding Solo Show).

He also directed the world premieres of Craving for Travel, which he also wrote with Edwards (Peter J. Sharp Theater @ Playwrights Horizons); Shida, a musical by Jeannette Bayardelle (Ars Nova; four AUDELCO Award Nominations, including Best Director and Best Musical; also at the American Repertory Theater in 2014; LA premiere in 2015); The Last Smoker in America, an original musical by Tony nominee Bill Russell and Drama Desk nominee Peter Melnick (Westside Theatre); and Alan Brody’s Operation Epsilon (Four IRNE Awards, including Best Director, Best Play, and Best Ensemble; Three Elliot Norton Award Nominations).

Sandberg directed Bernice Bobs Her Mullet in 2007 (NYMF), R.R.R.E.D. in 2009 (NYMF), Zelda at the Oasis in 2012 (St. Luke's) and "Eli’s Comin’ to Broadway," a BC/EFA benefit hosted by Nathan Lane (Alice Tully Hall at Lincoln Center), as well as two Sing for Hope benefits, featuring Dick Cavett, Michael Cerveris, and Richard Kind.

In 2007, Sandberg assisted Hal Prince on the Broadway production of LoveMusik (SDC Fellowship), and he served as the Associate Director to Sheryl Kaller on Christopher Durang and Peter Melnick’s Adrift in Macao at Primary Stages.

=== Producer ===
At age 25, Sandberg became the youngest producer in history to win a Tony Award.

He has worked on Broadway and in London's West End. He was a producer of the hit revival of Hair (2009 Tony, Drama Desk, Drama League, Outer Critics Circle Awards), the Broadway revival of Gore Vidal's The Best Man, starring James Earl Jones, Angela Lansbury, Candice Bergen, Eric McCormack, and John Larroquette (2012 Tony, Drama Desk, Drama League, Outer Critics Circle Nominations), and Will Eno's critically acclaimed play The Realistic Joneses, starring Toni Collette, Michael C. Hall, Tracy Letts, and Marisa Tomei.

In the fall of 2009, Sandberg and Daryl Roth produced the New York premiere of Vigil, starring Malcolm Gets and Helen Stenborg. In the spring of 2010, Sandberg helped produce Paradise Found, a new musical co-directed by Hal Prince and Susan Stroman, produced at London's Menier Chocolate Factory and starring Mandy Patinkin. Off-Broadway, he helped produce Love, Loss, and What I Wore, by Nora and Delia Ephron (2010), and the lead producer of A Perfect Future, a new play by David Hay (2011).

He served as the Executive Producer for the Off-Broadway revival of Pageant (2015 Drama Desk nomination).

In 2010, he directed and produced a Columbus, Ohio, production of The Last Smoker in America, a new musical by Bill Russell and Peter Melnick, which subsequently opened in New York in the summer of 2012 under Sandberg's direction.

=== Actor ===
As an actor, Sandberg appeared as Jimmy opposite Lea Michele in the 2006 New York Musical Theatre Festival (NYMF) production of Hot and Sweet. Other roles have included Huck in Big River, Sam in Fully Committed, and Joey in Scarlett Fever. He has appeared in the films The Living and The Battle of Pussy Willow Creek.

== Awards and nominations ==
- Hair (2009) – Tony Award, Drama Desk Award, Drama League Award, Outer Critics Circle Award – Best Revival of a Musical
- The Best Man (2012) – Tony, Drama Desk, Drama League, Outer Critics Circle Nominations – Best Revival of a Play
- Operation Epsilon (2013) – IRNE Award – Best Director
- Shida (2013) – AUDELCO Award Nomination – Best Director
- Application Pending (2015) – Broadway World Award – Best Off-Broadway Play; Drama Desk Nomination – Outstanding Solo Show; Book Pipeline Competition Winner

== Other ==
Sandberg is a member of the Stage Directors and Choreographers Society (SDC), Actors’ Equity Association (AEA) and the Off-Broadway League. He currently sits on the boards of the Yale Dramatic Association, the Whiffenpoof Alumni Association, and the Browning School (NY). He is President of the Browning Alumni Association and the Yale Alley Cats Alumni Organization.
