= Net Worth (disambiguation) =

Net worth is the total assets minus total outside liabilities of an individual or a company.

Net Worth may also refer to:

- Net Worth (1995 film), a Canadian television film about Ted Lindsay's fight for hockey player's rights
- Net Worth (2000 film), an American drama film
- "Net Worth" (Sliders), a television series episode
- "Net Worth" (Law & Order: Special Victims Unit), a 2017 episode
