= The Pretender: Rebirth =

2013 novel by Steven Mitchell and Craig Van Sickle

- First edition
- Author: Steven Long Mitchell & Craig W. Van Sickle
- Language: English
- Genre: Science fiction
- Publisher: Telemachus Press
- Publication date: October 7, 2013
- Publication place: United States
- Pages: 264 (Kindle), 276 (Paperback)
- ISBN: 978-1-939927-78-1
- Preceded by: The Pretender
- Followed by: The Pretender: Saving Luke

The Pretender: Rebirth is the first novel based on the cult television show The Pretender, which ran on NBC from 1996 to 2000. Following the series' cancellation, TNT produced two television movies, The Pretender 2001 and The Pretender: Island of the Haunted. The book is the first of an intended new series. It is written by series creators Steven Long Mitchell and Craig W. Van Sickle who have promised in a 2013 interview to answer fans' long-standing questions that were left unanswered in the TV series and both TV movies, such as the mystery of Miss Parker's parentage and actual first name, to name a few.

== Premise ==
Based on the same premise as that of The Pretender TV series, Jarod is a genius, a Pretender and he has escaped the facility (The Centre) where he was raised from a very young age, having no memory of his parents. He can become anyone that he wants to be but he does not know who he is. He spends his time outside of The Centre, doing good and defending the "weak and abused" to make up for the heinous deeds performed by The Centre using his simulations.

== Plot ==
The plot of Rebirth is loosely based on the Pilot episode of The Pretender with several significant changes. Jarod is on his presumably first pretend as a doctor, to gain access to a special secret wing of a hospital where there is a patient he must see, to achieve his goal and help a family find out what happened to their young son. The events that are similar to the Pilot episode have more to do with The Centre's hunt for Jarod than with Jarod's own activities on the outside of The Centre, as he resides in Harlem, New York. There are a number of new characters with whom Jarod interacts in this story, who have no bearing on the plot of the original Pilot episode.

== Characters ==
In general, the characters in the novel are similar to their TV incarnations however there are slight differences in Jarod and Miss Parker and some of the minor characters have been renamed.

- The following characters from the TV series Pilot episode are featured in this novel: Jarod, Miss Parker and Sydney.
- Mr. Parker, who was not featured in the Pilot episode is also featured in the novel.
- There are several new characters in The Centre world who were not from either the Pilot episode or the rest of the TV series that have been introduced in this first novel. These include Mr. Zane and Cornelius.

== Links ==
- https://www.facebook.com/ThePretenderFans/ (For transcripts of interviews about Rebirth etc.)
- http://www.thepretenderlives.com (For news from The Pretender creators)
- http://www.pretendercentre.com (For archived announcements from The Pretender creators with sneak peeks of the new books)
- http://www.goodreads.com/book/show/18500525-the-pretender---rebirth
