= When He's Not a Stranger =

1989 television film by John Gray

- Genre: Drama
- Teleplay by: John Gray; Beth Sullivan
- Story by: Josephine Cummings; Richard Yalem; Beth Sullivan
- Directed by: John Gray
- Starring: Annabeth Gish; Kevin Dillon; Kim Myers; John Terlesky
- Music by: Mark Snow
- Country of origin: United States
- Original language: English

Production
- Executive producer: Don Ohlmeyer
- Producers: Karen Danaher-Dorr; Ian Sander
- Production location: California
- Cinematography: Mike Fash
- Editor: Edward R. Abroms
- Running time: 100 minutes
- Production companies: Ohlmeyer Communications Company; World International Network

Original release
- Network: CBS
- Release: November 6, 1989

When He's Not a Stranger is a 1989 American made-for-TV crime drama film directed by John Gray and starring Annabeth Gish, Kevin Dillon, Kim Myers, and John Terlesky. The story is about a college freshman who is physically and sexually assaulted by a controlling football jock, and addresses the ordeal that rape victims experience. The movie was originally planned to be broadcast on October 17, 1989, but was delayed due to coverage surrounding the earthquakes in Northern California. The film premiered on CBS on November 6, 1989.

When He's Not a Stranger was released amid a wave of TV shows and movies addressing rape. The film specifically addressed acquaintance rape, with scholars Carol Bohmer and Andrea Parrott calling it a "landmark" for doing so.

== Plot ==
At Woodward University, a football-oriented California school, Lyn McKenna is raped by her best friend's abusive, controlling boyfriend, football star Ron Cooper. Lyn is hesitant to reveal this information as she fears that doing so will create social backlash and worsen the aftermath of her experience. However, continued threats from Ron and his fellow football teammates drive Lyn to desperate action. She requests that the school hold a disciplinary hearing against Ron and ultimately demands that a district attorney prosecute.

== Cast ==
- Annabeth Gish as Lyn McKenna
- John Terlesky as Ron Cooper
- Kevin Dillon as Rick
- Kim Myers as Melanie Fairchild
- Stephen Elliott as Attorney Foster
- Paul Dooley as Ben McKenna
- Micole Mercurio as Emily McKenna
- Allan Arbus as Judge Thomas J. Gray
- John M. Jackson as Woodward University Coach

== Critical reception ==
When He's Not a Stranger received mixed reviews. Matt Roush of USA Today called the film "schlock" composed of "hokey us-against-them scenarios." Irv Letofsky of the Los Angeles Times, while acknowledging the serious subject matter, "criticized the film's "simple-minded characterizations and elementary insights." More positive were The New York Times' John J. O'Connor, who said the film "maintains a surprisingly hard edge" and noted its treatment of class issues, and The Washington Post's Tom Shales, who praised Gish's performance especially. John Leonard of New York also praised the performances.

Some reviewers found the film exploitative. A Philadelphia Inquirer op-ed wrote that the graphic scenes leading up to Lyn's assault "hardly serve an educational function," and argued that they were intended to boost ratings with salacious content rather than to raise awareness.
