= The Pretender: Island of the Haunted =

- Genre: Action; Drama
- Written by: Steven Long Mitchell; Craig W. Van Sickle
- Directed by: Frederick King Keller
- Starring: Michael T. Weiss; Andrea Parker; Patrick Bauchau; Jon Gries; Richard Marcus; Jamie Denton; Harve Presnell; Paul Dillon
- Theme music composer: Velton Ray Bunch
- Country of origin: United States
- Original language: English

Production
- Executive producers: Steven Long Mitchell; Craig W. Van Sickle; Frederick King Keller
- Producer: Michael J. Maschio
- Running time: 96 minutes
- Production companies: Imagiquest Entertainment; NBC Studios; 20th Century Fox Television
- Budget: $4 million

Original release
- Network: TNT
- Release: December 10, 2001

Related
- The Pretender 2001

The Pretender: Island of the Haunted is an American made-for-television action-drama film and the second and final of The Pretender franchise of movies starring Michael T. Weiss, as a professor searching for a mysterious artifact. The television film was released on American cable channel TNT on December 10, 2001.

== Plot ==
The film begins with Jarod (Michael T. Weiss) working as a professor and searching for a mysterious artifact. Both he and Ms. Parker (Andrea Parker) received e-mails containing a photograph of their mothers standing side by side at the end of the previous film, and it is revealed that the artifact Jarod is searching for appears in the photograph, engraved on a wall behind the two women. Jarod's search leads him to a shopkeeper who shows Jarod a small hidden compartment below his store, where the picture of his mother and Mrs. Parker was apparently taken. The shopkeeper believes the shop to be haunted, as occult worship once took place there, and tells Jarod that the engraving on the wall is evidence of this. Meanwhile, Ms. Parker visits the store and leaves with a small doll, then returns to The Centre, where she shows the doll to Angelo. Angelo goes into a fit, drawing a perfect picture of the engraving, and then draws a picture of an old monastery, calling it an "Evil Place" and chanting "evil people, evil place" repeatedly. The monastery is on the Isle of the Haunted, where Jarod has gone to find his mother. Ms. Parker follows.

A hunt begins for a set of scrolls containing prophecies on the Isle of Carthis. Jarod and Ms. Parker form an uneasy alliance in order to learn the history behind The Centre. While tracing her lineage, Ms. Parker discovers that her supposed father, Mr. Parker (Harve Presnell), is actually her uncle, and that she is actually the daughter of William Raines (Richard Marcus). The Centre's original founder, Ms. Parker's ancestor, is revealed to have once resided on Carthis. In light of these discoveries, Ms. Parker's allegiance starts to waver. She turns Jarod over to the Centre authorities once they reach the mainland, but later confronts her "father", Jarod, Raines, and Lyle (James Denton) on board their plane. When Jarod goads Mr. Parker into looking at the text of the scrolls, Parker is stunned by what he reads. He grabs the scrolls, then parachutes out of the plane, apparently to his death.

On Raines' orders, Lyle murders the plane's pilot and co-pilot, but the plane's electronics are shorted out by Mr. Parker's exit. Jarod convinces Lyle and Raines to release him so he can safely land the plane using his aircraft knowledge while Miss Parker and Lyle try to re-connect the electronics before the plane crashes. They succeed, and during the crash-landing Jarod escapes. With Mr. Parker seemingly dead, Mr. Raines assumes control of The Centre, and the chase between Jarod and Ms. Parker resumes. In addition, Lyle begins working independently to capture Jarod, and Raines makes it clear that Ms. Parker will face severe consequences if she fails to bring Jarod in first. During one of Jarod and Ms. Parker's infrequent phone conversations, Ms. Parker expresses sympathy for Jarod and his mission, but warns that she will continue to try and capture him.

The story ends with the coveted scrolls washing up on a deserted beach. Their text seems to prophesy both the formation of The Centre and the appearance of a Chosen One ... "a boy named Jarod."

== Cast ==
- Michael T. Weiss as Jarod
- Andrea Parker as Miss Parker
- Patrick Bauchau as Sydney
- Jon Gries as Broots
- Harve Presnell as Mr. Parker
- Richard Marcus as William Raines
- James Denton as Mr. Lyle
- Paul Dillon as Angelo
- Diana Leblanc as Ocee
- John Bourgeois as Brother Menenicus
- Jack Langedijk as Brother Rinaldus
- Julian Richings as Brother Clote
- Dean McKenzie as A Triumvirate Sweeper
- Chloe Randle Reis as Cryptkeeper's Daughter
- Sam Ayers as Sam the Sweeper (uncredited)
- Glenn Bang as Mr. Parker's Doctor (uncredited)
- Neil Crone as Owner, The Alley Sports Bar (uncredited)
- Kim Myers as Jarod's mother (uncredited)
- Frank McAnulty as Brother Theo (uncredited)
- Conrad Coates as Adama (uncredited)
