= A Perfect Future =

A Perfect Future is a two-act play by David Hay, set in 2005. The play premiered Off-Broadway at the Cherry Lane Theatre in February 2011. The production was directed by Tony Award nominee Wilson Milam (The Lieutenant of Inishmore). A Perfect Future opened on February 17, 2011 followed by previews beginning February 4. The show was produced by Tony Award winner Andy Sandberg, Whitney Hoagland Edwards, and Neal-Rose Creations. The final performance was Sunday, March 6, 2011, after a run of 35 performances—13 previews and 22 regular performances. This darkly comedic, four-character play explores the question of whether two people can be married and truly love each other when their political ideologies differ.

== The Original Off-Broadway Cast ==
In order of appearance:

- Donna Bullock as Natalie Schiff-Hudson
- Daniel Orekes as Elliot Murphy
- Michael T. Weiss as John Hudson
- Scott Drummond as Mark Colvin
- Understudies: Conan McCarty (John/Elliot), Nicole Orth-Pallavicini (Natalie), Markus Potter (Mark)

== Synopsis ==
New York power couple John and Natalie are hosting a dinner for Elliot, a friend from their college days, along with Mark, a strait-laced young man. After drinking too many expensive bottles of wine, the group's past and their long-buried secrets resurface. Over the course of this raucous evening, their basic belief systems are upended, as the four come to terms with what happens when they try to reconcile idealism with reality.

This high-society evening turns into a night of sexually charged mind games that could change their lives forever.
