= Kimberly Cullum =

American former child actress

- Born: Los Angeles, California, U.S.
- Occupation: Actress
- Years active: 1989–1998

Kimberly Cullum is an American former child actress, who had many film and television roles during the 1990s.

== Biography ==
Born in Los Angeles, California, Cullum is the daughter of cartoonist Leo Cullum, whose work regularly appeared in The New Yorker magazine. Her younger sister Kaitlin Cullum is also a former child actress.

== Career ==
Cullum began acting professionally at the age of seven, when she starred in the 1989 made-for-TV movie The Revenge of Al Capone, starring Keith Carradine. Among her other credits are appearances on The Fresh Prince of Bel-Air, Empty Nest (in the episode "Read All About It"), VR.5 (with Louise Fletcher), Quantum Leap (1992), Star Trek: The Next Generation (1994), the 1994 TV movie Long Shadows (with Matt Frewer), and the 1994 films Monkey Trouble (with Thora Birch and Christopher McDonald) and Maverick (with Mel Gibson, Jodie Foster, and James Garner).

In 1995, she was a regular on the short-lived series Bless This House. Her sister Kaitlin was a regular on the hit television series Grace Under Fire, on which Kimberly guest-starred twice in 1996–1997.

Cullum has not acted since her Young Artist Award-nominated appearance on Nothing Sacred in 1998.

=== Awards ===
She has amassed a number of Young Artist Award nominations for her roles in a 1991 TV movie The Sitter, the 1991 film The Rapture, and the 1992 TV movie Grave Secrets: The Legacy of Hilltop Drive. She was also nominated for a YA Award for her performance as Gia in the Star Trek: The Next Generation episode "Thine Own Self".

Of her eight Young Artist Award nominations, she has won two: her first was for her work in a three-episode arc on Quantum Leap, starring Scott Bakula and Dean Stockwell. She won her second YA Award for her appearances on the sitcom Home Improvement, playing Michelle, the girlfriend of Randy Taylor.
