= Richard Marcus =

American actor

- Born: September 19, 1945 (age 80); United States
- Occupation: Actor
- Years active: 1979–2009

Richard Marcus (born September 19, 1945) is an American actor who is best known for his roles in St. Elsewhere, Tremors, and The Pretender.

== Actor ==
Richard Marcus' first role was on the television show The White Shadow, guest starring in two episodes. He worked steadily throughout the 1980s, and landed a recurring role (as Ralph, "The Birdman of St. Elegius") on the acclaimed NBC drama St. Elsewhere.

He continued to act into the 1990s, and in 1996, he starred as Dr. William Raines on the television series The Pretender. He reprised his role in two television movies in 2001. Since The Pretender, Marcus has continued to act regularly, including guest starring in two episodes of 24 in 2005.

== Filmography ==
Title	Format	# of episodes	Character	Year(s)
The White Shadow	Series	2 episodes	Benny/ Writer	1979-1980
Hill Street Blues	Series	1 episode	Blind Man	1981
The Being	Film	-	Joe the Lab Assistant	1983
Hollywood Beat	Series	1 episode		1985
Alfred Hitchcock Presents	Series	1 episode	Levy	1985
Enemy Mine	Film	-	Arnold	1985
Deadly Friend	Film	-	Harry Pringle	1986
St. Elsewhere	Series	7 episodes	Ralph	1982-1986
Desperado	TV movie	-	Emmett, Deputy/Jailer	1987
Jake and the Fatman	Series	1 episode		1988
Jesse	TV movie	-	Ray Butler	1988
Highway to Heaven	Series	1 episode	Baldwin	1989
Tremors	Film	-	Nestor Cunningham	1990
L.A. Law	Series	1 episode	Ray Breecher	1990
Superboy	Series	1 episode	Max Von Norman	1991
Space Rangers	Series	1 episode	Bashad	1993
And the Band Played On	TV movie	-	Reporter	1993*
Melrose Place	Series	2 episodes	Roger Lacey	1993
Dune 2000	Video game	-	Edric O	1998
The Pretender	Series	45 episodes	Dr. William Raines	1996-2000
The Pretender 2001	TV movie	-	Dr. William Raines	2001
The Pretender: Island of the Haunted	TV movie	-	Dr. William Raines	2001
24	Series	2 episodes	Forbes	2005
Hawthorne	Series	3 episodes	Mr. Fleming	2009

*Uncredited
