= The Sitter (1991 film) =

- Genre: Drama; Thriller
- Based on: Mischief by Charlotte Armstrong
- Teleplay by: Rick Berer
- Directed by: Rick Berger
- Starring: Kim Myers; Brett Cullen; Kimberly Cullum
- Music by: Laura Karpman
- Country of origin: United States
- Original language: English

Production
- Producer: Gina Scheerer
- Cinematography: Edward J. Pei
- Editor: Lynne Southerland
- Running time: 92 minutes
- Production company: FNM Films

Original release
- Network: Fox
- Release: June 10, 1991

The Sitter is a 1991 television film directed by Rick Berger and starring Kim Myers as Nell, an unstable babysitter, who lives in the reality of romance novels. It is a remake of the 1952 Marilyn Monroe film Don't Bother to Knock, which in turn was based on the Charlotte Armstrong novel Mischief.

== Background ==
Berger said he took more inspiration from Armstrong's book than its 1952 film adaptation: "I took what I liked about the book and did a lot of extrapolation," he told the San Francisco Chronicle. He discouraged the cast from taking cues from the movie.

== Plot ==
Nell, a shy and quiet girl, is told that she will babysit a young rich girl at a hotel while the girl's parents attend a party. Nell feels isolated and has unrealistic expectations of love and relationships, based on what she reads in romance novels. She is taken with the little girl, Melissa (Kimberly Cullum). She has her call her "mommy" and gives Melissa a marble that she says is magic. Next, she lets her go with her to a toy store. While on the street, they play "pick a card" with a vendor. He thinks Melissa is cheating and yells at her. Nell yells at the man, saying her "daughter" isn't a cheater. While at the hotel a dog had tried to bite at Melissa, so Nell buys a toy plane. It flies into a back room where the dog chases after it, and the dog is heard whimpering.

While Nell is trying on Melissa's mother's clothes and jewels in the hotel room, Nell sees a handsome man named Jeff (Brett Cullen) across the street. He calls her up for a date. She imagines them married with Melissa as their daughter and two other children. He is interested in Nell but he is taken aback when she starts asking if he loves her.

The film ends with Nell on the ledge of the roof with Melissa and Jeff. He tells her not to hurt Melissa and she lets Melissa go, who drops the marble. Nell runs to the ledge to get it and in her dream world, she's talking to Jeff, Melissa and two other children. She hears him call "Nell? Nell?" The camera pans to the street in front of the hotel where Nell has fallen to her death; she has a smile on her face.

== Cast ==
- Kim Myers as Nell
- Brett Cullen as Jeff Harper
- Kimberly Cullum as Melissa Jones
- Susan Barnes as Alice
- Susanne Reed as Ruth Jones
- James McDonnell as Dennis Jones
- Eugene Roch as Carl
- Patricia George as Winona
- Maria Richwine as Mary
- Adolfo Quinones as Nick

== Critical reception ==
The Baltimore Evening Sun said the film was overly long and "goes limp before it's halfway through." The Indianapolis Star wrote that the movie was poorly paced, despite its compelling subject matter. And the Chicago Tribune went so far as to call it "one of the worst TV movies ever made," criticizing both the script and Myers as an actress, writing that she "exhibits the acting skills of a mannequin." However, both the Evening Sun and the Chicago Sun-Times did praise Myers' performance, however, both commenting on her resemblance to Meryl Streep.
