= Andrea Parker =

American actress (born 1969)

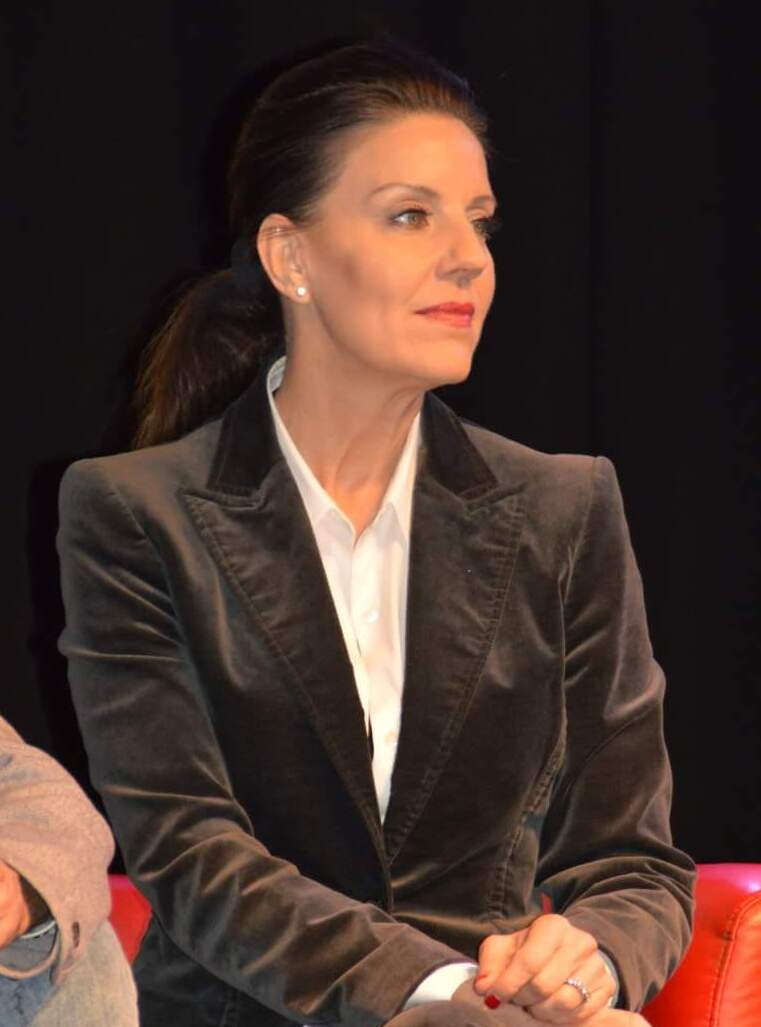
- Parker in 2018
- Born: March 8, 1969 (age 57)
- Occupation: Actress
- Years active: 1988–2017
- Spouse: Michael Birnbaum

Andrea Parker (born March 8, 1970) is an American film and television actress. She is known for her roles on ER, JAG, The Pretender, Less than Perfect, Desperate Housewives, and Pretty Little Liars.

== Early years ==
Parker is a native of southern California. When she was 8 years old, she became a ballet student, and when she was 15 she left home and joined the San Francisco Ballet. She "danced professionally for a few years" with that group and went on to take acting classes and work in commercials as a contemporary dancer.

== Career ==
Parker's first speaking role was in "The Contest", an episode of Seinfeld. Her first documented film role was at age 19 in the movie Rented Lips in which she played a dancer/nurse. Parker appeared in Married... with Children as a go-go dancer in two episodes.

In 1995, Parker was cast in Donald Bellisario's NBC series JAG as Kate Pike, the initial female lead for the two-part pilot. However, when JAG was picked up for a full series, the producers replaced Parker with Tracey Needham in the new role of Meg Austin, although Parker did make several guest appearances as Kate throughout the first season. Parker instead went on to star in The Pretender; another NBC series in which she portrayed Miss Parker, an operative for a sinister agency known as The Centre. She played the role for all four seasons.

After The Pretender was cancelled in 2000, Parker did another guest spot on JAG before signing on to reprise her role as Miss Parker in two telemovies for The Pretender, which aired on TNT in 2001. She then returned to series television in 2002 and starred in the ABC comedy Less than Perfect, playing Lydia Weston until it was cancelled in 2006. From 2011 to 2012, Parker had the recurring role of Jane Carlson in the ABC series Desperate Housewives. She later starred in NBC drama pilot Beautiful People, and joined the cast of ABC Family series Pretty Little Liars.

== Personal life ==
Parker married producer Michael Birnbaum. She supports various charities such as the National Hospice Palliative Care Organization, Glenn Siegel's My Good Friend charity organization, the Michael J. Fox Foundation for Parkinson's disease research, and Project Angel Food. In February 2006, Parker attended a benefit with former Pretender co-stars Michael T. Weiss and James Denton for Cure Autism Now.

== Filmography ==
=== Film ===
Year	Title	Role	Notes
1988	Rented Lips	Dancer / Nurse	
1988	Earth Girls Are Easy	Dancer in Beauty Salon	
1990	Brush with Death	Colleen	
1992	The Naked Truth	Miss France	
1994	Body Shot	Shark Club Dancer	
2000	Delicate Instruments	Dr. Anne Harper	Short film

=== Television ===
Year	Title	Role	Notes
1989	Married... with Children	Go-Go Dancer	Episodes: "Married... with Prom Queen: Parts 1 & 2"
1992	Seinfeld	Nurse	Episode: "The Contest"
1993	Dave's World	Alicia	Episode: "It's a Small Van After All"
1993	Herman's Head	Heather Brookshire	Episode: "A Decent Proposal"
1993	The Adventures of Brisco County, Jr.	Rita Avnet	Episodes: "Deep in the Heart of Dixie", "A.K.A. Kansas"
1994	XXX's and OOO's	Kelly Morgan	Television film
1994	Ellen	Joanna	Episode: "The Dentist"
1994	Coach	Penny	Episode: "Coach for a Day: Part 2"
1994–95	ER	Linda Farrell	Recurring role (Seasons 1 & 2), 10 episodes
1995	Dream On	Winnie	Episode: "She Won't Do It, But Her Sister Will"
1995–96, 2001	JAG	Lt. JG/Lt/CDR Caitlin 'Kate' Pike	Recurring role (season 1); guest role (season 6); 5 episodes
1996	Can't Hurry Love	Kit	Episode: "Valentine's Day Massacred"
1996	Ed McBain's 87th Precinct: Ice	Det. Eileen Burke	Television film
1996	Coach	Jean Brandow	Episode: "Dauber's Vehicle"
1996	Murder, She Wrote	Anne Larkin	Episode: "Race to Death"
1996–2000	The Pretender	Miss Parker / Catherine Parker	Main role, 86 episodes
2001	The Pretender 2001	Miss Parker / Catherine Parker	Television film
2001	The Pretender: Island of the Haunted	Miss Parker	Television film
2002	First Monday	FBI Agent Dawson	Episode: "Dangerous Words"
2002–06	Less than Perfect	Lydia Weston	Main role, 81 episodes
2005	Kitchen Confidential	Suze	Episode: "Exile on Main Street"
2006	Help Me Help You	Krista	Episode: "Inger Management"
2008	The Mentalist	Ann Meier	Episode: "Red-Handed"
2009	My Name Is Earl	Rich Lady	Episode: "Friends with Benefits"
2009	CSI: Miami	Allison Burgess	Episode: "In Plane Sight"
2011	Suits	Tory	Episode: "The Shelf Life"
2011–12	Desperate Housewives	Jane Carlson	Recurring role (Season 8), 11 episodes
2011, 2013–17	Pretty Little Liars	Jessica DiLaurentis	Main role (Season 7), recurring role (Season 4), guest star (Seasons 2, 5–6), 21 episodes
2011, 2013–17	Pretty Little Liars	Mary Drake	Main role (Season 7), guest star (Season 4, 6), 15 episodes
2012	Common Law	Laura the A.D.A.	Episode: "Pilot"
2013	Devious Maids	Brenda Coulfax	Episode: "Pilot"
2014	Jennifer Falls	Francine	Episode: "Health Club"
2014–15	Red Band Society	Sarah Souders	Recurring role, 4 episodes

== Awards and nominations ==
Year	Award	Category	Nominated work	Result
1999	Satellite Awards	Best Actress in a Series, Drama	The Pretender	Nominated
2005	Women's Image Network Awards	Outstanding Lead Actress in a Comedy Series	Less Than Perfect	Won
