= Leo Cullum =

American pilot and cartoonist (1942–2010)

- Born: Leo Aloysius Cullum; January 11, 1942 Newark, New Jersey, USA
- Died: October 23, 2010 (aged 68) Los Angeles, California, USA
- Area: Cartoonist

Leo Aloysius Cullum (January 11, 1942 – October 23, 2010) was an American cartoonist, one of the more frequent contributors to The New Yorker with more than 800 gag cartoons published. He started his drawing career after having served as a pilot in the United States Marine Corps during the Vietnam War and flying planes commercially for Trans World Airlines and American Airlines.

== Early life ==
Born in Newark, New Jersey, Cullum was raised in North Bergen, New Jersey and earned his undergraduate degree in 1963 from the College of the Holy Cross, where he majored in English literature. He joined the United States Marine Corps after graduating from college, earning a commission as a second Lieutenant. Upon completion of his flight training in Pensacola, Florida, Cullum deployed to Vietnam, where he flew more than 200 missions, mostly ground attacks in support of the infantry in addition to attacks on the Viet Cong supply lines on the Ho Chi Minh trail in Laos. Though the missions over Laos were not officially acknowledged, Cullum was baffled by the need for secrecy, saying "the North Vietnamese certainly knew it wasn't the Swiss bombing them".

== Early cartoons ==
After completing his military service, Cullum became a pilot for TWA, which was later taken over by American Airlines, where he worked until his retirement in 2001. In between flights, he started doodling, continuing his early interest in drawing cartoons. He said, "I bought some instructional books which explained the format, and I began studying the work of various cartoonists". He had always hoped to be published in The New Yorker, which turned down a series of his early entries. The magazine liked some of Cullum's concepts for cartoons, which were turned over to Charles Addams for illustration, with the first of Cullum's ideas appearing in print in 1975 showing a couple paddling in a canoe with their reflection in the water showing a vision of the man attacking the woman. Addams convinced Cullum to pursue his craft, and his first sale was to Air Line Pilot Magazine. He had later cartoons printed in Argosy, Saturday Review and Sports Afield.

== The New Yorker ==
Over his career with The New Yorker the magazine published 819 of his cartoons, many of which involved animals. His first successful entry was published on January 3, 1977, and featured a man wearing a robe at an office desk in a room filled with chickens. A cartoon with the caption "This island isn't big enough for two cliches" showed a school of fish attempting to crawl onto the shore of a desert island populated by a man and a lone palm tree. Cartoon editor Bob Mankoff called him "one of the most popular" cartoonists at The New Yorker during the 1980s and 1990s and "one of the most consistently funny cartoonists we ever had". Cullum's was the first cartoon included in the first illustrated issue printed after the September 11 attacks, with the caption "I thought I'd never laugh again. Then I saw your jacket." One of his most requested cartoons features a man lecturing a cat with the caption "Never, ever, think outside the box". His final published cartoon appeared in the issue dated October 25, 2010.

== Books ==
His published books include collections about doctors and birds, with the respective punny titles of Suture Self and Tequila Mockingbird. Other books featured his cartoons about cats, dogs and business people.

A resident of Malibu, California, Cullum died of cancer at the age of 68 on October 23, 2010, at Cedars-Sinai Medical Center in Los Angeles. He was survived by his wife, Kathy, a former flight attendant whom he had met on a flight to Boston, as well as by his daughters Kaitlin Cullum and Kimberly Cullum, both of whom had been child actors.
