= WHEE-LO =

Child toy based on magnets

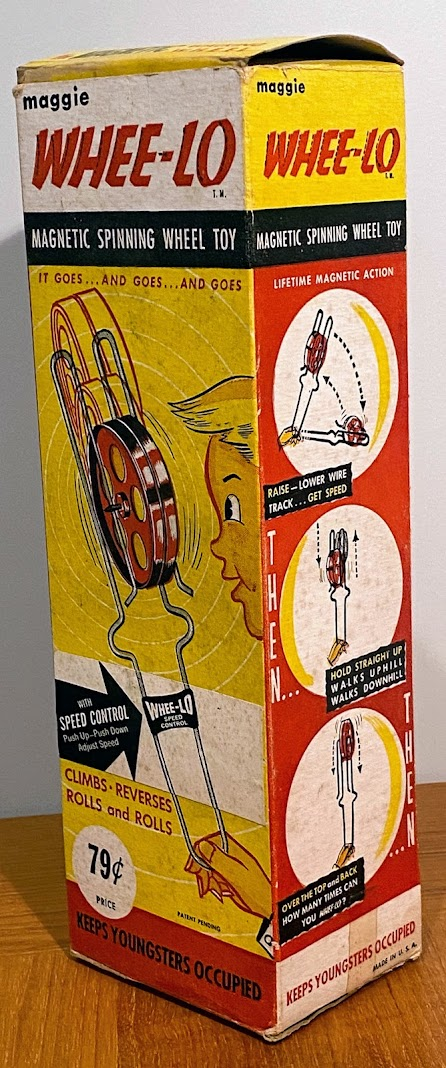
Box for a WHEE-LO toy

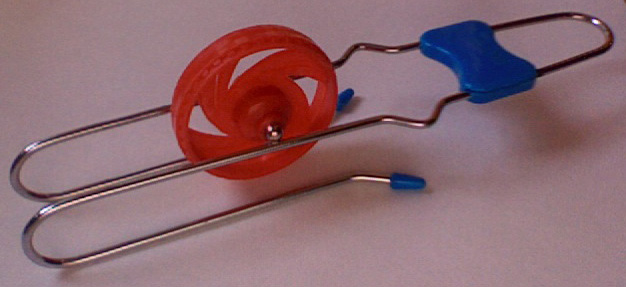
The Schylling "magnetic gyro toy" has a design that is very similar to the original WHEE-LO toy.

WHEE-LO is a trademark for a handheld toy that propels a plastic wheel along both sides of a metal track with magnets built into the wheel. As the track is tilted up and down, the wheel rolls the length of the track, top and bottom, and then again on the opposite side of the wire. In this way, the wheel always keeps in contact with the track, and can be continually propelled on its cyclical course. With proper timing, the wheel can be brought to a great speed. The trademark was first registered in 1958, but the toy had been marketed in 1953 by the Maggie Magnetic company in New York City. It included six colorful cardboard cutout discs ("Whee-lets") that attached to the wheel and created optical illusions as it spun.

In his autobiography, The Stringless Yo-yo, Harvey Matusow states that he invented the toy and sold the rights to the Maggie Magnetic company in the early 1950s.

Over the years, several other companies have marketed related toys with different names. As of 2024, the Schylling company manufactures a "Magnetic gyro wheel" toy. The Ipidi company manufactures a toy titled "Retro Magic Rail Twirler".

A plastic piece at one end of the track serves as both a handhold for the toy and an adjustable slider to position the width of the track. The narrower the track, the faster the wheel goes, because the axle is thicker in the middle and you get more distance per each rotation of the wheel. Widen the track, and the wheel goes slower.

== Cultural references ==
In the television series Family Guy's fourth season episode "You May Now Kiss the... Uh... Guy Who Receives", news anchor Tom Tucker begins playing with a WHEE-LO during a broadcast. He continues, "Look at that. In the thirties, they called this an Uncle Spinny Dervish," to which co-anchor Diane Simmons replies, "Really?" Tom answers, "I don't know, I'm just bored."

In the television series Mad Men, season 1, episode 6, Don Draper steps on a Wheel-o and falls down the stairs while bringing his wife Betty a Mother’s Day breakfast.

In the 2024 movie Unfrosted, which depicts a fictionalized account of the history of Pop-Tarts, has news anchor Walter Cronkite playing with one and exclaiming "Daddy's got himself a WHEE-LO!"
