= Alan Brody =

American playwright and academic

Alan Brody is an American playwright and academic, currently Professor of Theater at Massachusetts Institute of Technology. As a playwright, he has won numerous awards. He has also directed plays and written two novels, Coming To and Hey Lenny, Hey Jack. From 2000 to 2006 he served as Associate Provost for the Arts at MIT.
