= Lisa Cerasoli =

American actress

- Born: January 27, 1969 (age 57); Iron Mountain, Michigan, U.S.
- Occupations: Actress; author
- Known for: General Hospital; Port Charles
- Spouse: Peter Weaver (m. 2003–2013)
- Children: 1

Lisa Cerasoli (born January 27, 1969, in Iron Mountain, Michigan) is an American actress. She is known for her role as Venus (V) Ardonowski on General Hospital.

== Personal life ==
Cerasoli moved back to Michigan from Los Angeles in 2003 to care for her father, Richard, until his death in July. Two months later, in September 2003, she wed Peter Weaver. They had a daughter, Jazzlyn "Jazz" Jo, in 2005. In 2007, Lisa's grandmother, Nora Jo, came to live with them until her death in 2010 from Alzheimer's disease. In 2013, Lisa revealed that her marriage had ended.

== Career ==
Cerasoli portrayed the character of Venus Ardanowski on General Hospital and Port Charles from 1997 to 1999. She also made appearances on Diagnosis Murder, Pensacola: Wings of Gold, Oh, Grow Up, The Pretender, and Boomtown.

In 2009, she published a romantic fiction book, On the Brink of Bliss and Insanity. In 2010, she published the memoir As Nora Jo Fades Away: Confessions of a Caregiver about living with her grandmother with Alzheimer's. The book was adapted into a short film by Cerasoli, 14 Days With Alzheimer's, which premiered it at the 2012 Women's International Film Festival in Los Angeles and at 15 other film tests across the country.

== Filmography ==
=== Film ===
Year	Film	Role	Notes
2002	S1mOne	Premiere Audience Member	

=== Television ===
Year	Title	Role	Notes
1995-1997	Acapulco Bay	Marnie Swanson	52 episodes
1997	House of Frankenstein		2 episodes tv miniseries
1998	Pensacola: Wings of Gold	Dana Mason	Episode: "S.O.D."; Episode: "Stand Down"
1997-1999	General Hospital	Venus "V" Ardanowski	
1997-1999	Port Charles	Venus "V" Ardanowski	
1999	Oh, Grow Up	Janet	Episode: "Pilot"
1999-2000	The Pretender	Zoe	Episode: "Road Trip"; Episode: "The Inner Sense: Part 1"; Episode: "The Inner Sense: Part 2"
1998-2000	Diagnosis: Murder	Sheryl Winter; Julie Warren	Episode: "Baby Boom"; Episode: "Blind Man's Bluff"
2002	Boomtown	Mia Lang	Episode: "The Squeeze"
