= Net Worth (2000 film) =

- Directed by: Kenny Griswold
- Written by: Kenny Griswold; Bill Kerig
- Produced by: Michael Baker; Cerise Fukuji; Bill Kerig; Kris Wiseman McIntyre
- Starring: Todd Field; Craig Sheffer; Daniel Baldwin
- Cinematography: Yoram Astrakhan
- Edited by: Sean Hubbert
- Music by: David Lawrence
- Distributed by: A-Mark Entertainment
- Release date: 2000
- Running time: 94 minutes
- Country: United States
- Language: English
- Budget: $5 million

Net Worth is a 2000 drama film that starred Todd Field, Craig Sheffer, Daniel Baldwin, Michael T. Weiss, Tara Wood, Ernie Garrett, and Alix Koromzay. It was directed by Kenny Griswold from a script written by Kenny Griswold and Bill Kerig. The films was released through Blockbuster Video.

== Plot ==
Four competitive friends agree to a bet: they will all go to a city where none of them know anybody, with only $100 in their pockets. As the winner will be the person who has the greatest net worth at the end of 30 days. Despite all having a different philosophy about work and wealth they all believe they will win the bet.
