= Psychogenic =

A psychogenic effect is one that originates from the brain instead of other physical organs (i.e. the cause is psychological rather than physiological) and may refer to:

- Psychogenic pain
- Psychogenic disease
- Psychogenic amnesia
- Psychogenic cough, i.e. a habit cough
- Mass psychogenic illness
