= Bill Kerig =

American film director

William A. Kerig, also known as Bill Kerig, is a media entrepreneur, author, journalist, and filmmaker. Kerig is best known for founding and creating the RallyMe online fundraising platform for athletes, which he sold to NBC Universal in 2016. Born and raised on the north shore of Boston, he currently resides in Salt Lake City, Utah. Kerig gained acclaim in the Olympic sports world with the launch of the first athlete-centric crowdfunding platform RallyMe.com in 2012, which he sold to NBC's SportsEngine in 2016. In 2018 he launched a new platform designed to build community among Olympic and youth sport coaches GreatCoach.com, which was recognized as a tool for helping protect youth in the growing SafeSport era. In February, 2019, GreatCoach.com became the first organization to publish a fully aggregated listing of coaches banned by sports organizations.

== Film and television ==
Kerig wrote, produced, and directed the documentary film Ready to Fly, which won Best Feature Film at the Banff Film Festival.

He wrote and directed the documentary film The Edge of Never, which was sold to Showtime Networks.

He was a co-producer and story creator of the documentary film Steep (Sony Pictures Classics).

He was a producer on CBS's 48 Hours “Father and Son” one-hour broadcast.

Kerig served as a producer for CBS at the 1998 Olympic Winter Games in Nagano, Japan. Due to his knowledge of skiing, snowboarding, and ice hockey, he was hired as a "fixer" to work on the Sports/News Desk. He has worked as an ESPN Winter X Games commentator.

== Print ==
Kerig's book Utah Underground (2001) from Mountain Sports Press remains a cult success as an underground guide on how to have fun in conservative state. Kerig also wrote The Snowboarder’s Total Guide to Life (Random House Villard). He went on to become the founder, publisher and editor of The Wasatch Journal, a special interest magazine in Utah that was published from 2007 to 2008.

He wrote The Edge of Never (2008), a nonfiction book that was nominated for Adventure Book of the Year by the American Independent Publishers’ Association and was a finalist for Book of the Year at the Banff Book Festival.

His journalistic work has appeared in Fast Company, Men’s Journal, Men’s Health, Ski, Skiing, and Powder.

== Internet ==
- Founder/CEO Great Coach, Inc. DBA Clear2
- Founder/CEO RallyMe, Inc.

== Athlete ==
- Professional Mogul Skier, World Pro Mogul Tour
- Captain of the PowerBar Pro Mogul Team
- Captain St. Michael's College Ice Hockey Team
- Coach of Salt Lake Lightning, a youth hockey team
- Coach of Salt Lake Lady Lightning U19
- Coach of Utah Lady Grizzlies U19 Travel Team
- Coach of Utah Golden Eagles U16 Travel Team
