= Kim Myers =

American television and film actress (born 1966)

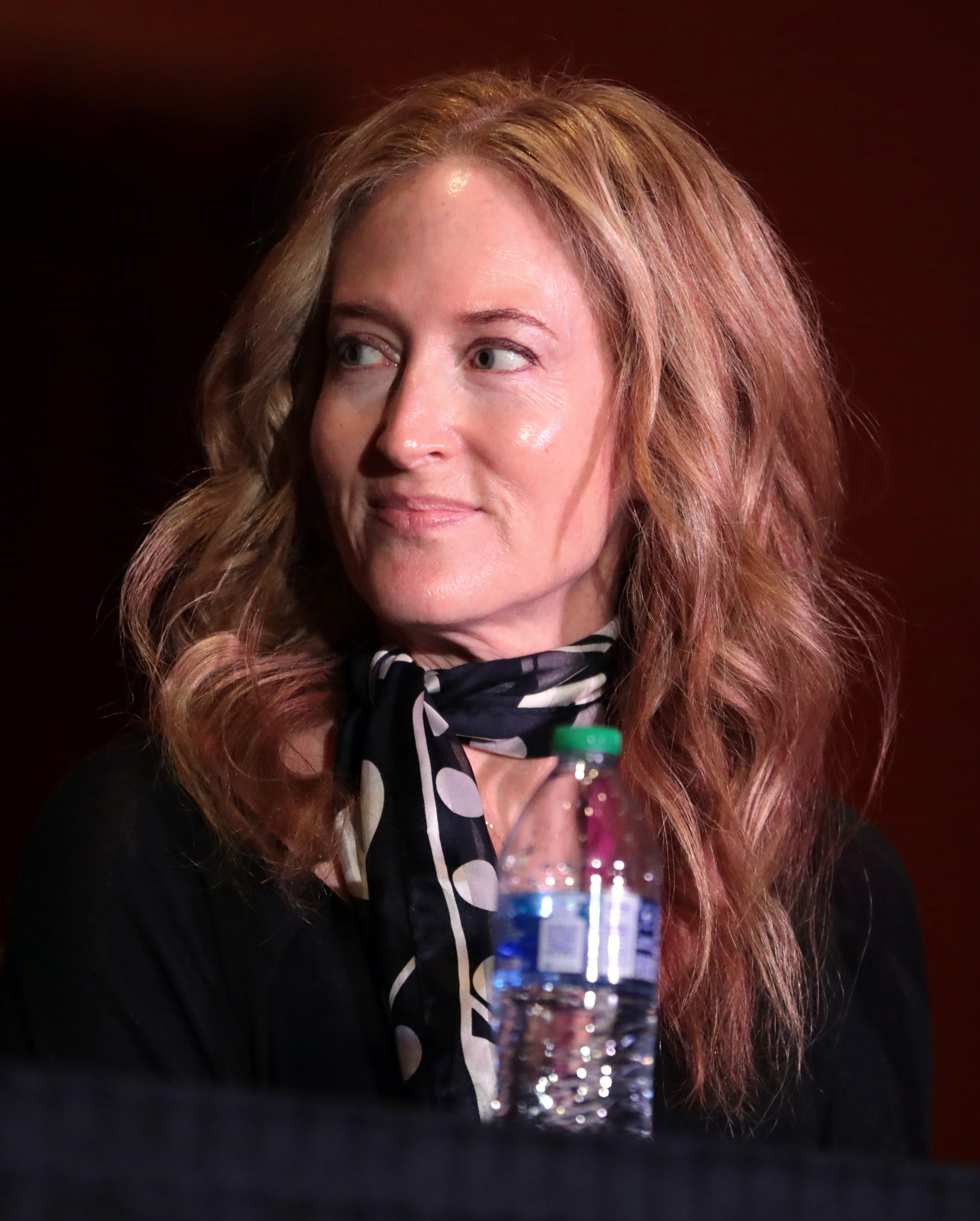
- Myers at Mad Monster Party Arizona 2023
- Occupation: Actress
- Years active: 1985–present

Kim Myers is an American television and film actress.

Her breakthrough role was in the 1985 horror film A Nightmare on Elm Street 2: Freddy's Revenge as Lisa Webber. She acted in another horror sequel in 1996, Hellraiser: Bloodline.

== Filmography ==
=== Film ===
Year	Title	Role	Notes
1985	A Nightmare on Elm Street 2: Freddy's Revenge	Lisa Webber	
1987	In the Mood	Wendy	
1988	Illegally Yours	Suzanne Keeler	
1988	State Park	Eve	
1990	White Palace	Heidi Solomon	
1990	Best Shots	Lia Black	
1994	At Risk	Jennifer	
1996	Hellraiser: Bloodline	Bobbi	
1998	Letters from a Killer	Gloria Stevens	
2004	The Dust Factory	Angie Flynn	
2007	The Last Sin Eater	Iona Kai	
2011	JumpRopeSprint	Kim Ruggle	
2012	The Forger	Brynn Mason	
2014	10,000 Days	Veena Hesse	
2016	Don't Tell Kim	Kim Ruggle	
2020	Jumping the Gun	Kim Ruggle	
2022	5000 Blankets	Betty	

=== Television ===
Year	Title	Role	Notes
1986	CBS Schoolbreak Special	Kim	Episode: "The Drug Knot"
1987	Tales from the Hollywood Hills: A Table at Ciro's	Jenny Robbins	Television film
1987, 1990	L.A. Law	Kerry Martin / Patricia Brophy	2 episodes
1988	The Bronx Zoo	Lori	Episode: "On the Land, on the Sea and in the Halls"
1989	Out on the Edge	Chris Evetts	Television film
1989	Studio 5-B	Samantha Hurley	10 episodes
1989	When He's Not a Stranger	Melaine Fairchild	Television film
1990	People Like Us	Marguerite Hanrahan	Television film
1991	The Sitter	Nell	Television film
1991	The Young Riders	Doritha Simmons Maxwell	Episode: "Just Like Old Times"
1992	Something to Live for: The Alison Gertz Story	Lindy	Television film
1993	Key West	Dr. Reilly Clarke	12 episodes
1993	Walker, Texas Ranger	Evie	Episode: "Unfinished Business"
1994	Under Suspicion	Michelle Brian	Episode: "Father/Daughter Murder"
1996	Seinfeld	Pam	Episode: "The Soul Mate"
1996–1999	The Pretender	Jarod's Mother	8 episodes
1997	Perversions of Science	Selena	Episode: "Ultimate Weapon"
2001	The Beast	Lucy	Episode: "The Delivery"
2001	The Pretender: Island of the Haunted	Jarod's Mother	Television film
2001	Family Law	Julie Deverell	Episode: "Angel's Flight"
2002	Six Feet Under	Dr. Michaelson	Episode: "The Secret"
2002	The Agency	Ilene	Episode: "Finale"
2003	JAG	Petty Officer Allison La Porte	Episode: "Shifting Sands"
2004	Threat Matrix	Karen	Episode: "Stochastic Variable"
2004	Judging Amy	Mrs. McCarty	Episode: "Early Winter"
2006	The Closer	Allison Grant	Episode: "Mom Duty"
2010	10,000 Days	Veena Hesse	11 episodes
2013	Notes from Dad	Vivian	Television film
