= Sam Ayers =

American actor

- Born: Samuel Bielich III; Youngstown, Ohio
- Other name: Sam Ayres
- Occupation: Actor

Sam Ayers (born Samuel Bielich III) is an American actor.

Ayers was born in Youngstown, Ohio, the son of Samuel Bielich Jr., a director of construction and carpenter. He was raised in Merrimack, New Hampshire. He moved to New York City and began using his mother's name of Ayers as his professional name. He found recurring roles on several soap operas. He moved to Los Angeles permanently in 1995 and married actress Robin Lynne Trapp in 1998; they had their daughter Alexis Ann the following year.

== Filmography ==
Year	Title	Role	Notes
1990	Quick Change	ESU Commander	
1995	Bad Boys	Detective #2	
1997	The Reel	Messenger	
2001	Not Another Teen Movie	Paramedic	Uncredited
2002	Angels Don't Sleep Here	David Roy	
2012	General Education	Samson	
2012	Bigfoot County	Travis	
2012	Wedding Day	Even Mason	
