= The Pretender 2001 =

- Genre: Action; Drama
- Written by: Steven Long Mitchell; Craig W. Van Sickle
- Directed by: Frederick King Keller
- Starring: Michael T. Weiss; Andrea Parker; Patrick Bauchau; Jon Gries; Richard Marcus; Jamie Denton; Harve Presnell
- Music by: Velton Ray Bunch

Production
- Executive producers: Steven Long Mitchell; Craig W. Van Sickle; Frederick King Keller
- Producer: Michael J. Maschio
- Running time: 96 minutes
- Production companies: Imagiquest Entertainment; NBC Studios; 20th Century Fox Television
- Budget: $4 million

Original release
- Network: TNT
- Release: January 22, 2001

Related
- The Pretender TV series; The Pretender: Island of the Haunted

The Pretender 2001 is an American made-for-television action drama film and the first of The Pretender movies to air after the series was cancelled by NBC. It was originally released on American cable channel TNT on January 22, 2001, written by Steven Long Mitchell and Craig W. Van Sickle, directed by Frederick King Keller and starring Michael T. Weiss.

== Plot ==
The story reunites the entire cast from the series, picking up where the season four cliffhanger ended. Jarod (Michael T. Weiss), Ethan, and Miss Parker (Andrea Parker) are alive after the bomb explosion on the train. Jarod is now posing as an agent of the National Security Agency; he is part of a task force assembled to find the "Chameleon", a killer who displays all the adaptive traits of a Pretender.

The Centre is forced to put its hunt for Jarod on hold after its administrator, Mr. Parker (Harve Presnell) is abducted. Miss Parker discovers that William Raines (Richard Marcus) is still alive, despite allegedly being shot dead by her father. Her brother, Mr. Lyle (James Denton), attempts to finish Raines off, but Miss Parker manages to spirit him away and hide him in her house. In return, Raines agrees to shed light on who might have kidnapped her father.

Jarod begins receiving taunting clues from the Chameleon, which leads him to believe that the killer holds a grudge against him personally. This revelation takes Jarod back to the days leading up to his escape from the Centre; he did not originally plan to leave alone. Jarod hatched a plan with two fellow Pretenders, including a man named Alex (Peter Outerbridge), to escape from the facility together. Unfortunately, Alex was captured during their escape. He was swiftly sent out of the country and endured hideous torture by his captors; Alex now wants revenge on Jarod as a result. Observing that Jarod's search for his biological family has allowed the Centre to continue to dominate him, Alex took the opposite path by finding his own family and then murdering them. From his perspective, this has 'freed' him from the Centre's control; however, he is still not satisfied and kidnaps Mr. Parker with the intent of killing him too.

After incriminating evidence that points to Jarod is left behind by Alex, Jarod's partners at the NSA suspect him of being the "Chameleon." The Centre's programmer, Broots (Jon Gries), is on Jarod's trail when he is swept up in the NSA investigation and thrown into an interrogation room. Jarod immediately recognizes Broots, but decides to cover up for him rather than risk exposing them both. As Jarod is escorting Broots out of the NSA building, Jarod's partners move in to arrest them both. Jarod flees in a vehicle with Broots in tow, then later ditches him by the side of the road.

At the climax, Jarod thwarts Alex's next assassination and helps free Mr. Parker. Before he commits suicide, Alex gloats that the truth of Jarod's true identity will die with him. Mr. Parker is injured during the struggle and rendered catatonic. As Jarod and Miss Parker exchange words over the phone, both of them receive an anonymous email simultaneously; the message contains an image of two women, the mothers of Miss Parker and Jarod, standing together. The email is revealed to have been sent by Mr. Raines himself, apparently as a show of thanks for rescuing him.

== Cast ==
- Michael T. Weiss as Jarod
- Andrea Parker as Miss Parker/Catherine Parker
- Patrick Bauchau as Sydney
- Jon Gries as Broots
- Harve Presnell as Mr. Parker
- Richard Marcus as William Raines
- Jamie Denton as Mr. Lyle
- Tyler Christopher as Ethan
- Peter Outerbridge as Alex
- Cynthia Dale as Agent Andrea Zane
- Derwin Jordan as NSA Agent
- Yannick Bisson as NSA Agent Edward Ballinger
- Paul Dillon as Angelo

== Production ==
In October 2000, it was announced TNT, which had acquired syndication rights to The Pretender from NBC, would be reviving the series for a pair of TV movies to resolve plot threads that were left unresolved by its cancellation. TNT stated that they had no interest in continuing production of new episodes of the series, but were open to producing further films for The Pretender provided the ratings for the first two TV movies were successful.

== Reception ==
The movie earned a 4.4 Nielsen rating, and 5.538 million viewers making it one of the top ten primetime shows on cable for January 2001.
