= Michael T. Weiss =

American actor (born 1962)

- Born: Michael Terry Weiss; February 2, 1962 (age 64); Chicago, Illinois, US
- Education: University of Southern California (BFA)
- Occupation: Actor
- Years active: 1980–present

Michael Terry Weiss (born February 2, 1962) is an American actor known for his role as Jarod in the television series The Pretender and for his role in Days of Our Lives.

== Early life ==
Weiss was born in Chicago, Illinois, on February 2, 1962. His father was a steel industry executive, and his mother was a homemaker. His sister, Jamie Sue Weiss, became a make-up artist for television and films.

He attended Glenbrook North High School in Northbrook, Illinois. He graduated with a Bachelor of Fine Arts from the University of Southern California.

== Career ==
=== Screen ===
Weiss began acting when he was a child, when he appeared in local TV commercials in Chicago.

In 1980, at age 18, he appeared as an extra in the film Ordinary People. Shortly after his college graduation, he was cast as Mike Horton on Days of Our Lives. He performed in the 1991 series Dark Shadows, as well as in the feature film Jeffrey (1995).

His most prominent role has been Jarod, the lead character in the NBC-TV primetime drama The Pretender which ran for four seasons (1996–2000) and subsequent TV movies, The Pretender 2001 and The Pretender: Island of the Haunted. He performed as Jarod in three crossover episodes with the series Profiler as well. He had a recurring role in four episodes of Crossing Jordan (2003–04).

Weiss has performed several voice-acting roles. He voiced The Nameless One, the protagonist of the computer game Planescape: Torment (1999). He voiced Tarzan in The Legend of Tarzan (2001–02) and its related direct-to-video feature film, Tarzan & Jane (2002), Etrigan the Demon in Justice League (2002) and Justice League Unlimited (2005), Adam Strange in Batman: The Brave and the Bold (2009–11), and Captain Atom in Young Justice (2012–13). Weiss voiced Dormammu in Marvel vs. Capcom 3: Fate of Two Worlds (2011) and its updated version Ultimate Marvel vs. Capcom 3.

=== Stage ===
Weiss performed in Impressionism, a play by Michael Jacobs and directed by Jack O'Brien. It opened at the Gerald Schoenfeld Theatre on March 12, 2009.

Weiss appeared in A Perfect Future, off-Broadway at the Cherry Lane Theatre. The production was directed by Wilson Milam.

== Personal life ==
In February 2006, Weiss attended a benefit with his former Pretender co-stars Andrea Parker and James Denton for Cure Autism Now.

== Filmography ==
=== Film ===
Year	Title	Role	Notes
1980	Ordinary People	Extra	Uncredited
1988	Howling IV: The Original Nightmare	Richard Adams	
1994	Angel 4: Undercover	Ryan Gersh	
1994	Jeffrey	Steve Howard	
1996	Freeway	Larry	
1999	Freeway II: Confessions of a Trickbaby	Drifter	
2000	Dinosaur	Creto	Voice
2001	Net Worth	Michael Winslow	
2001	Bones	Detective Al "Loopy Lou" Lupovich	
2002	Tarzan & Jane	Tarzan	Voice
2003	Written in Blood	Matthew Ransom	
2004	Until the Night	Daniel	
2004	Marmalade	Peter	
2005	Confessions of an Action Star	Drug Lord	
2005	Iowa	Larry Clarkson	
2006	Razor Sharp	Dexter "Dex"	Short film
2007	Fade	Doctor McCabe	
2010	Sex and the City 2	Handsome Man at Wedding	
2017	Sunset Park	Duane	

=== Television ===
Year	Title	Role	Notes
1985–1990	Days of Our Lives	Mike Horton	468 episodes
1988	Take My Daughters, Please	Joe Blake	Television film
1990	The Big One: The Great Los Angeles Earthquake	Larry	Television film
1991	Dark Shadows	Joe Haskell / Peter Bradford (1791 Storyline)	11 episodes
1992	2000 Malibu Road	Roger Tabor	6 episodes
1994	Red Shoe Diaries	The New Man	Episode: "The Game"
1995	Remember Me	Scott Covey	Television film
1996–2000	The Pretender	Jarod	86 episodes Nominated—Satellite Award for Best Actor – Television Series Drama (1998–99); Nominated—Saturn Award for Best Actor on Television
1999–2000	Profiler	Jarod	3 episodes
2000	Men in Black: The Series	Unknown Role	Voice, episode: "The Baby Kay Syndrome"
2001	The Pretender 2001	Jarod	Television film
2001	The Zeta Project	Dr. Wilhelm	Voice, episode: "Absolute Zero"
2001	The Pretender: Island of the Haunted	Jarod	Television film
2001–2003	The Legend of Tarzan	Tarzan	Voice, main role
2002	Jackie Chan Adventures	Giles	Episode: "Pleasure Cruise"
2002	Justice League	Etrigan the Demon / Jason Blood	Voice, episode: "A Knight of Shadows"
2003	The Mummy	Nizam Toth	Voice, 3 episodes
2003–2004	Crossing Jordan	James Horton	4 episodes
2005	Justice League Unlimited	Etrigan The Demon / Jason Blood	Voice, episode: "The Balance"
2005	Clubhouse	Jackie Tambler	Episode: "Save Situation"
2005–2007	Higglytown Heroes	Mountain Rescue Hero	Voice, 3 episodes
2009–2011	Batman: The Brave and the Bold	Adam Strange	Voice, 2 episodes
2011	Blue Bloods	Sonny Malevsky	4 episodes
2011	Burn Notice	Holcomb	Episode: "Army of One"
2012–2013	Young Justice	Captain Atom	Voice, 7 episodes

== Theatre ==
Year	Title	Role	Notes
2007	Scarcity	Herb	Nominated—Drama Desk Award for Outstanding Featured Actor in a Play
2009	Impressionism	Douglas Finch	
2010	The Elaborate Entrance of Chad Deity	Everett K. Olson	
2011	A Perfect Future	John Hudson	

=== Video games ===
Year	Title	Role	Notes
1999	Planescape: Torment	The Nameless One	
2003	Freelancer	Orillion	
2011	Marvel vs. Capcom 3: Fate of Two Worlds	Dormammu	
