= Frederick King Keller =

American film director (1950–2026)

- Born: April 18, 1950; Buffalo, New York, U.S.
- Died: January 26, 2026 (aged 75); Los Angeles, California, U.S.
- Other names: Fred Keller; Fred K. Keller; Frederick K. Keller
- Occupations: Film and television director, television producer, screenwriter
- Years active: 1981–2026
- Parent: Frederick A. Keller

Frederick King Keller (April 18, 1950 – January 26, 2026) was an American director, producer and screenwriter for film and television. He was the son of actor and screenwriter Frederick A. Keller. His father was a television pioneer who produced and directed the first weekly dramatic series seen on television. Besides acting and directing in theater his father also ran several art-house movie theaters in Buffalo which the young Fred became intimately involved with and which formed the root of his cinematic education.

== Life and career ==
While earning his Bachelor of Arts in English from Hamilton College, he was able to meet, study, and work with Nat Boxer, one of Francis Ford Coppola's favorite technicians, then at Hamilton's sister school Kirkland College. While still in school, Fred produced and directed several short films, one of which, A Winter's Tale, was screened at the Cannes Film Festival.

After producing and directing several short drama films for the Communications Office of the Catholic Diocese of Buffalo (one of which, A Midnight Clear, won a Gabriel Award), they asked him to develop and direct a feature-length film for local television entitled Skeleton Key. Following the success of that endeavor and due to a connection made at college with the author Natalie Babbitt, Fred produced and directed the original film based on her book Tuck Everlasting. He followed that up with another Babbitt adaptation, The Eyes of the Amaryllis. His third independently produced and directed film was Vamping, starring Patrick Duffy.

Partly due to the success of these films, especially the Babbitt films for young audiences, Fred was engaged to direct half of the episodes for Nickelodeon's first sitcom, Hey Dude, shot entirely on location in Tucson, AZ. The directing of over 200 hours of television followed, including multiple episodes of New York Undercover, The Pretender, House, 24, CSI: Miami, Boomtown, Numb3rs, Life and Blue Bloods. He had also been either the producer or supervising producer on a number of shows, including The Pretender, Boomtown and Blue Bloods. He returned to short form with the pilot for the series Weight, which won the 2016 WGA Award for Short Form New Media-Original. His current project, The Cartoonist, is a feature-length mystery thriller set during the Cannes Film Festival, which will be filmed on the Côte d’Azur in collaboration with the Paris-based production company Pistoleros.

In addition to his film and television career, Keller also directed numerous plays and two operas.

Keller died in Los Angeles on January 26, 2026, at the age of 75.
