= The Pretender (TV series) =

American action drama television series (1996–2000)

- Genre: Action; Drama
- Created by: Steven Long Mitchell; Craig W. Van Sickle
- Starring: Michael T. Weiss; Andrea Parker; Patrick Bauchau; Jon Gries
- Theme music composer: John Debney; Rick Patterson; Velton Ray Bunch; Mark Leggett
- Composers: John Debney (pilot); Charles Sydnor; Velton Ray Bunch
- Country of origin: United States
- Original language: English
- No. of seasons: 4
- No. of episodes: 86 (list of episodes)

Production
- Executive producers: Steven Long Mitchell; Craig W. Van Sickle; Tommy Thompson; Rick Wallace
- Producers: Marianne Canepa; Juan Carlos Coto; Jan DeWitt; Harvey Frand; Andrew Dettmann; Daniel Truly; Michael Klick
- Running time: 46 minutes
- Production companies: Mitchell/Van Sickle Productions; NBC Studios; MTM Enterprises (season 1); 20th Century Fox Television (seasons 2–4)

Original release
- Network: NBC
- Release: September 19, 1996 – May 13, 2000

Related
- The Pretender 2001; The Pretender: Island of the Haunted

The Pretender is an American action drama television series created by Steven Long Mitchell and Craig W. Van Sickle, that aired on NBC for four seasons from September 19, 1996, to May 13, 2000.

The series follows Jarod, a young man who is a "Pretender", a genius impostor able to quickly master the complex skill sets necessary to impersonate a member of any profession. He was kidnapped as a child by The Centre, a sinister think tank located in the fictional Blue Cove, Delaware. It exploited his Pretender abilities, but Jarod escaped as an adult and goes on the run. He is chased by a trio of Centre agents—Miss Parker (the daughter of a pivotal figure within The Centre), Sydney (a Centre psychologist who raised Jarod) and Broots (a Centre computer expert). In each episode, Jarod assumes a new professional identity (such as a doctor, lawyer, soldier, pilot) to investigate a crime framed on someone else, and deliver justice to the actual culprits. In the meantime, Jarod searches for his origins, and leads Miss Parker, Sydney and Broots on a chase to discover the dark secrets of The Centre, including how they are involved in the death of Miss Parker's mother.

The series was inspired by serial impostor Ferdinand Waldo Demara. It was a part of the network's Saturday night lineup until its cancellation after four seasons. TNT ordered two sequel television films that aired in 2001—The Pretender 2001 and The Pretender: Island of the Haunted. In 2013, creators Steven Long Mitchell and Craig W. Van Sickle began updating the story with a book series and graphic novels; the first, The Pretender: Rebirth, was published on October 7.

== Plot ==
Jarod (Michael T. Weiss) is a prodigy who is abducted very early and raised in a think tank called the Centre, based in the fictional town of Blue Cove, Delaware. Told that his parents have died, Jarod is assigned to the care of a man named Sydney (Patrick Bauchau), a psychiatrist working for the Centre. During Jarod's youth, Sydney mentors the boy and regularly coaches him through complex simulations designed to exploit his intellect for real life application. But some years later, Jarod discovers that the Centre is using data gathered from his responses for nefarious purposes, such as illegal black ops and engineering the deaths of others. Feeling responsible, Jarod escapes the Centre. Soon afterward, he discovers that the people whom he had long believed to be his parents actually were not, as Jarod has an anomaly in his blood that a father or mother would share — which neither of his supposed parents do.

The Centre assigns a team to recapture Jarod, consisting of Sydney, computer expert Broots (Jon Gries), and "Miss Parker" (Andrea Parker), a dogged and formidable operative who was raised in the Centre and knew Jarod since always. Though she is no longer an active field operative, she is "recalled from Corporate" during the pilot episode and put in charge of Jarod's recapture; in exchange, she would get to leave The Centre. While Sydney feels loyalty to Jarod and wishes his safe return, Miss Parker is under orders to "preferably" bring him in alive and will not hesitate to use deadly force. Fearing for Jarod's safety, Sydney at times undermines Miss Parker and will directly prevent her from using lethal methods to prevent Jarod's continued evasion of his pursuers. In the pilot, Parker questions Sydney's commitment to the Centre, telling him he can be a scientist for the Centre or "mommy" to Jarod, but not both.

Despite The Centre's resources, Jarod often stays a step or two ahead of his pursuers. While tracking down clues to his past and his parents, Jarod also targets criminals who have gone unpunished or undetected by the law. Through assumed identities (which involve different surnames, but always "Jarod" as a first name), he uncovers the truth about these crimes, and lures the perpetrators into staged set-ups that emulate the harm they have done to others, and forces them to confess their crimes. At times, he leaves Miss Parker and Sydney deliberate clues ("breadcrumbs") that point to the criminals he is targeting and why. During his adventures, Jarod also discovers the joys of early life he was denied while being raised in isolation — such as bubblegum, ice cream, a Slinky, and Silly Putty — that are often used in these traps. Meanwhile, Miss Parker, Sydney, and Broots learn more about The Centre's dark secrets, and how the institution was involved in the death of Miss Parker's mother.

=== Series finale ===
Though Jarod learns more about his family, there are still unanswered questions when the series ends after four seasons. The series finale closed with Jarod and Miss Parker being nearby an exploding bomb. The ending did not reveal whether either survived the blast. The next year, the telemovie The Pretender 2001 picked up directly from this cliffhanger, leading into Jarod's next adventure.

== Themes ==
=== Loyalty ===
Loyalty is a recurring theme in the series. During the first season, Jarod sends Miss Parker evidence that she too has been manipulated by the organization, which is led by her father ("Mr. Parker"). Miss Parker discovers that she has been lied to about her mother's death, and The Centre was actually involved in her death (which she had been told was suicide). Although her loyalty wavers on her quest for answers, and some specific periods – most notably during early season two, when her father disappears and is replaced by Mr. Lyle and Brigitte – it never completely falters.

Similarly, Sydney's loyalty to The Centre wavers upon its actions. Having raised Jarod, Sydney feels a unique bond to Jarod, and is unwilling to harm him to recapture him. This rift increases when he discovers truths about what the organization – specifically Mr. Raines – has done to Jarod, other Pretender children, and his twin brother, Jacob, who is his only family.

=== Identity ===
Having been kidnapped as a young child and raised in The Centre, Jarod has little memory of his life before being taken by The Centre. He yearns to find the identity The Centre kept him from having, and to reunite with his family. Similarly, Miss Parker struggles with her identity throughout the series, after The Centre's dark secrets affect her own family, such as learning she has a twin brother, and the circumstances surrounding the death of her mother.

She learns from Jarod that she was lied to about how her mother Catherine Parker had died. Further revelations are made concerning Miss Parker's origins and her brother. This puts her in a parallel to Jarod's quest of discovery, and at times her loyalty wavers, though it never falters. When she and Jarod do share a romantic moment, Jarod questions if this will change things and Miss Parker replies it will not. "You run, I chase."

== Cast ==
- Michael T. Weiss as Jarod
- Andrea Parker as Miss Parker/Catherine Parker
- Patrick Bauchau as Sydney/Jacob
- Jon Gries as Broots (season 4; recurring previously)

=== Recurring ===
- Harve Presnell as Mr. Parker
- Richard Marcus as Dr. William Raines
- Paul Dillon as Angelo
- James Denton as Mr. Lyle
- Pamela Gidley as Brigitte
- Ryan Merriman as Young Jarod/Gemini
- Ashley Peldon as Young Miss Parker
- Alex Wexo as Young Sydney
- Jake Lloyd as Young Angelo
- Kelsey Mulrooney as Debbie Broots
- Jeffrey Donovan as Kyle
- Jason Brooks as Thomas Gates
- Kim Myers as Jarod's mother

== Production ==
The pilot was filmed in and around Toronto, Ontario, Canada.

In the spring of 1999, the series was sold into syndication to TNT and The WB.

After the series was cancelled in May 2000, a fan campaign for the series to continue prompted negotiations involving the show's creators and both NBC and TNT. In October 2000, TNT greenlit two television films – The Pretender 2001 and Island of the Haunted – which aired on TNT in January and December 2001, respectively.

The creators of the show, Steven Mitchell and Craig van Sickle, stated that an ending was written for the series; they just needed financing to create it. In a September 2007 interview on the miniseries Tin Man, Mitchell and van Sickle noted that fans were still requesting an ending and that it would happen "soon" due to a relationship with Strange Highway Entertainment. They also noted that the storyline would continue digitally on the World Wide Information Superhighway. On May 21, 2008, van Sickle again expressed interest in having a final episode or film to finish the series, and asked fans to continue to be patient until it happens.

== Novels and rebirth of series ==
On July 8, 2013, it was announced through The Pretender Creators Facebook page that the series would be reborn. On July 19, the producers stated in an interview that they planned graphic novels and then a mini-series/movies.

The first Pretender novel, Rebirth, was released on September 22, 2013, in eBook and paperback through Amazon. The second Pretender novel, Saving Luke, was released on May 12, 2014, in eBook and paperback, also through Amazon.

== Episodes and nielsen ratings ==
Season	Episodes	Originally released		
Season	Episodes	First released	Last released	Network
1	22	September 19, 1996	May 17, 1997	NBC
2	22	November 1, 1997	May 16, 1998	NBC
3	22	October 17, 1998	May 22, 1999	NBC
4	20	September 25, 1999	May 13, 2000	NBC
Television films		January 22, 2001	December 10, 2001	TNT

Season		U.S. ratings	Network	Rank
1	1996–97	7.2 million	NBC	#89
2	1997–98	11.4 million	NBC	#59
3	1998–99	10.0 million	NBC	#71
4	1999–2000	8.7 million	NBC	#75

== Awards and nominations ==
Won

FAITA Award (also known as First Americans in the Arts Awards):

- Outstanding Guest Performance by an Actor in a TV Drama Series – Tyler Christopher (2001)

Young Artist Awards:

- Best Performance in a TV Drama Series — Guest Starring Young Actor – Seth Adkins (1999)
- Best Performance in a TV Drama Series — Supporting Young Actor – Ryan Merriman (1998–1999)

Nominations

Emmy Awards:

- Outstanding Main Title Theme Music by Mark Leggett and Velton Ray Bunch (2000)

Golden Satellite Award:

- Best TV Series—Drama (1998–1999)
- Best Performance by an Actor in a Drama Series – Michael T. Weiss (1998–1999)
- Best Performance by an Actress in a Drama Series – Andrea Parker (1999)

Saturn Award:

- Best Genre TV Actor – Michael T. Weiss (1998)

Young Artist Award:

- Best Performance in a TV Drama Series for Guest Starring Young Actor – Zachary Browne (1998)
- Best Performance in a TV Drama Series for Guest Starring Young Actress – Caitlin Wachs (2000)
- Best Performance in a TV Drama Series for Guest Starring Young Actress – Ashley Peldon (1999)
- Best Performance in a TV Drama Series for Young Actor – Ryan Merriman (1997)
- Best Performance in a TV Drama Series for Young Actress – Ashley Peldon (1997)

YoungStar Award:

- Best Performance by a Young Actor in a Drama TV Series – Ryan Merriman (1997, 1999–2000)

== Home media ==
20th Century Fox Home Entertainment released all 4 seasons on DVD in Region 1 between 2005–2006. They also released the two Pretender movies together as a set on March 13, 2007.

All episodes from the first two seasons are available for purchase online through Amazon.com's video on demand service.

== Thrillogy ==
Thrillogy was a short lived sci-fi/action programming block on NBC's Saturday night that debuted in Fall of 1996 with three action/sci-fi series: Dark Skies, The Pretender, and Profiler. When Dark Skies was cancelled before the 1996–97 television season was over, NBC attempted to keep the Thrillogy block intact for the 1997–98 season by inserting the new series Sleepwalkers.

At the midseason point of the 1999–2000 season, NBC reintroduced the Thrillogy lineup with the addition of paranormal series The Others.

== See also ==
- T.H.E. Cat – American action drama television series
