= An Act of Murder =

1948 film

- Film poster
- Directed by: Michael Gordon
- Written by: Michael Blankfort; Robert Thoeren
- Based on: Die Mühle der Gerechtigkeit by Ernst Lothar
- Produced by: Jerry Bresler
- Starring: Fredric March; Edmond O'Brien; Florence Eldridge; Geraldine Brooks
- Cinematography: Hal Mohr
- Edited by: Ralph Dawson
- Music by: Daniele Amfitheatrof
- Production company: Universal International Pictures
- Distributed by: Universal International Pictures
- Release date: December 5, 1948 (New York City)
- Running time: 91 minutes
- Country: United States
- Language: English

An Act of Murder is a 1948 American film noir directed by Michael Gordon and starring Fredric March, Edmond O'Brien, Florence Eldridge and Geraldine Brooks. It was based on a novel by the Austrian writer Ernst Lothar. The film was produced and distributed by Universal Pictures. It was entered into the 1949 Cannes Film Festival. It is also known by the alternative titles Live Today for Tomorrow and I Stand Accused.

== Plot ==
Calvin Cooke, a principled but stubborn judge, presides over a murder case in which lawyer David Douglas is unsuccessful in proving that his client's state of mind was a mitigating factor.

Cooke's daughter Ellie complains to her mother Cathy about how unyielding her father can be; Cathy insists that he is a loving husband. Anyway, it is their 20th wedding anniversary and she is planning to celebrate with friends at their house. Cooke does not know that Ellie (herself a law student) and Douglas are romantically involved until Douglas arrives during the party to take her on a date. Cooke and Douglas exchange sharp words of disagreement about their philosophies of the law.

At the party, Cathy talks to Dr. Morrison, an expert neurologist and friend of the family, about her intermittent symptoms of weakness and headaches. At his office, Morrison performs a series of tests and then consults other experts. Rather than tell her the truth, Morrison contacts her husband. Cathy has an inoperable brain tumor and will suffer increasingly until it kills her. Cooke agrees, rather than spoiling her remaining days, to keep the information secret. The doctor gives him a bottle of pills called Demarine for pain relief, strongly warning him about the maximum dosage, and a prescription for more.

Cooke, who previously said he was too busy with cases to take Cathy on a second honeymoon as she wished, now agrees to go at once. But her condition worsens rapidly, including excruciatingly painful headaches. Cooke gives her a dose of Demarine, pretending it is aspirin. While he is calling the doctor from a pay phone so Cathy will not hear, a dog is run over in the street, and a police officer ends its suffering with a gunshot. Cooke, evidently feeling disgust at similar thoughts of his own, discards the remaining pills.

Cathy, looking through their luggage for toiletries, accidentally discovers the doctor's written diagnosis and prescription. When Cooke returns to the room, she says she is feeling better but would like to return home. In the car, her symptoms return. They stop at a gas station to have a car problem repaired and Cooke asks urgently about the nearest drugstore. Back on the road, Cathy collapses in the car. Cooke can stand it no more. He deliberately drives off an embankment, not caring if he is also killed. He survives, confesses that he crashed on purpose, and in keeping with his philosophy, demands to be prosecuted for murder.

At Ellie's request, Douglas agrees to defend Cooke. He requests an autopsy in case Cathy had actually died from her illness before the crash. The finding is a surprise: she did die before the crash, but from a Demarine overdose. Douglas shows that she had had the prescription filled before the drive home, and taken the drug while at the gas station.

The trial judge then dismisses the murder charge, but declares that Cooke knew very well that what he tried to do was wrong, and should consider himself morally guilty. Cooke agrees, and announces that in expiation, if allowed to remain a judge, he will now rule on the basis that similarly a person can be legally guilty but morally innocent—just what Douglas and Ellie have been asking for.

== Cast ==
- Fredric March as Judge Calvin Cooke
- Edmond O'Brien as David Douglas
- Florence Eldridge as Cathy Cooke
- Geraldine Brooks as Ellie Cooke
- Stanley Ridges as Doctor Walter Morrison
- John McIntire as Judge Ogden
- Frederic Tozere as Charles Dayton
- Will Wright as Judge Jim Wilder
- Virginia Brissac as Mrs. Russell
- Francis McDonald as Mr. Russell
- Mary Servoss as Julia
- Don Beddoe as Pearson
- Clarence Muse as Mr. Pope
- Harry Harvey as Doctor Boyd
- Edward Earle as Doctor Standish
- Beatrice Roberts as Nurse Coble
- Harry Hayden as Mr. Hart
- Russ Conway as Wilson
- Renie Riano as Mrs. McGuinness
- David Leonard as Doctor Levi
- Ray Teal as Doctor McDermott
- Olga Fabian as Mrs. Novak
- Thomas E. Jackson as Bailiff
- Frank Darien as Old Man

== Production ==
The Courthouse Square set (which later received that name for having been prominently featured in Back to the Future) was built on the Universal Studios backlot for this film.

== Bibliography ==
- Fetrow, Alan G. Feature Films, 1940-1949: a United States Filmography. McFarland, 1994.
