= Studio Tour =

Ride at Universal Studios Hollywood

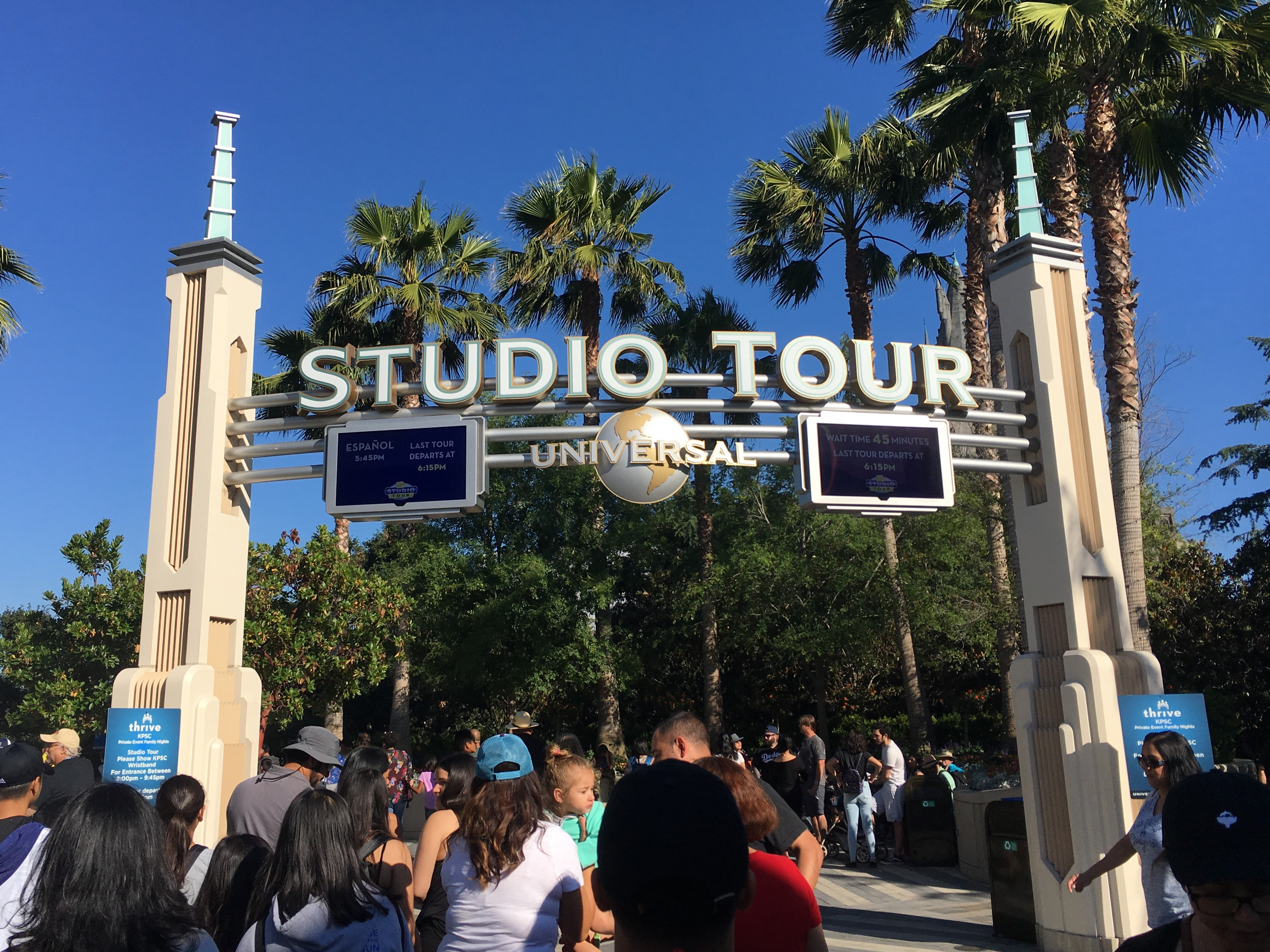

Universal Studios Hollywood
- Area: Upper Lot
- Status: Operating
- Opening date: July 15, 1964

Ride statistics
- Theme: Universal Pictures films
- Duration: 45–60 minutes
- Included attractions: King Kong 360; Flash Flood; Earthquake: The Big One; Jaws
- Website: Official website

The Studio Tour (also known as The Backlot Tour) is a ride attraction at the Universal Studios Hollywood theme park in Universal City, California, near Los Angeles. Opened on July 15, 1964, Studio Tour is the theme park's signature attraction. It travels through a working film studio, with various film sets on the Universal Studios Lot. Guests sit on multi-car trams for the duration of the ride and looking behind the scenes of Universal Pictures. The tour lasts about 45–60 minutes and is led by an in-person "tram guide" (who sits in the first car of the tram, facing the guests), with the aid of pre-recorded videos of Jimmy Fallon. It travels through the Front Lot, Backlot, and various attractions, passing sets and properties from movies along the way. The tour inspired a smaller but similar version at Universal Studios Florida, which was removed in 1995.

== History ==
The tour has operated in some form since 1915, when guests paid 25 cents to watch movies be filmed. In 1964, the pink and white Glamor Trams were introduced, and the tram tour became the main way of seeing all the attractions at Universal. The Front Lot Commissary was the original departure point for the tram. In 1965, the Upper Lot Studio Tour Center opened. The tram has departed from both the Lower and Upper Lots over the years, but since the opening of Jurassic Park: The Ride, both alighting and departing take place on the Upper Lot.

As the movie studio has evolved, the tour has evolved with the incorporation of advanced technology and the replacement of the original trams in the early 80s. In late 1989, CD players replaced some of the speaking roles of live tour guides. In 1999, DVD players and LCD screens were introduced, allowing tour guides to show scenes from movies filmed at the locations the trams pass, and in 2009, the screens were upgraded to high definition. In 2011, Jimmy Fallon joined the tour as a video host to supplement the live-action narration and perform an original song "Tram-Tastic" at the end of the tour. In 2022, electric trams began to be introduced into the fleet. To celebrate the 60th anniversary of the tram tour, the trams except the electric trams were redressed in pink and white to resemble the original Glamor Trams. Portions of the original Glamor Trams now serve as the shuttle to the Universal City Metro station.

Alongside its parent theme park, the Studio Tour shut down indefinitely in mid-March 2020 due to the COVID-19 pandemic, but then reopened in April 2021.

== Film sets ==
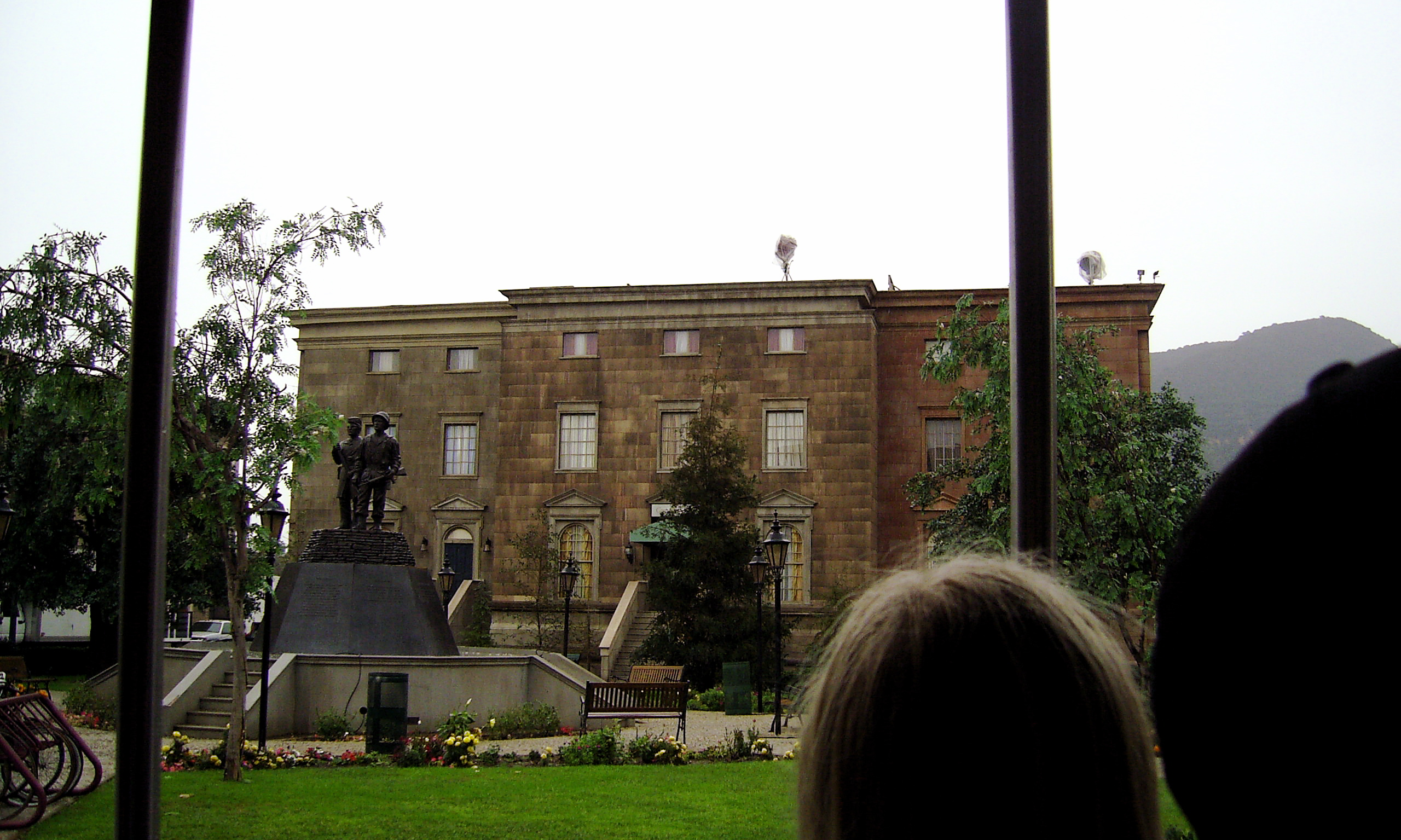
Courthouse Square from the Back to the Future films (while redressed for the TV show Ghost Whisperer)

Sets from the Universal movies Psycho, Back to the Future, The Sting, The Great Outdoors, and the Paramount/DreamWorks film War of the Worlds are visited in the tour. Walt Disney Studios has also used the backlot for movies such as the Pirates of the Caribbean film series, 101 Dalmatians, 102 Dalmatians, and The Princess Diaries 2: Royal Engagement, specifically for town scenes. There are also 'general purpose' sets visited, such as the neighborhood Wisteria Lane from Desperate Housewives, and a neighborhood that is made to look like an old west town. This neighborhood has six streets, each with the essentials of a saloon and sheriff's station. Before the advent of sound, up to six westerns could be shot at once. The tour also winds through sound stages, and the tour guide explains what movies, television shows, music videos, commercials, and/or still camera photo shoots are currently shooting on the lot. Stage One, where The Tonight Show with Conan O'Brien was filmed from June 2009 to January 2010, was added to the tour. O'Brien and announcer Andy Richter staged events outside the studio on occasion as part of The Tonight Show's Tour-ific Tramtacular sketch.

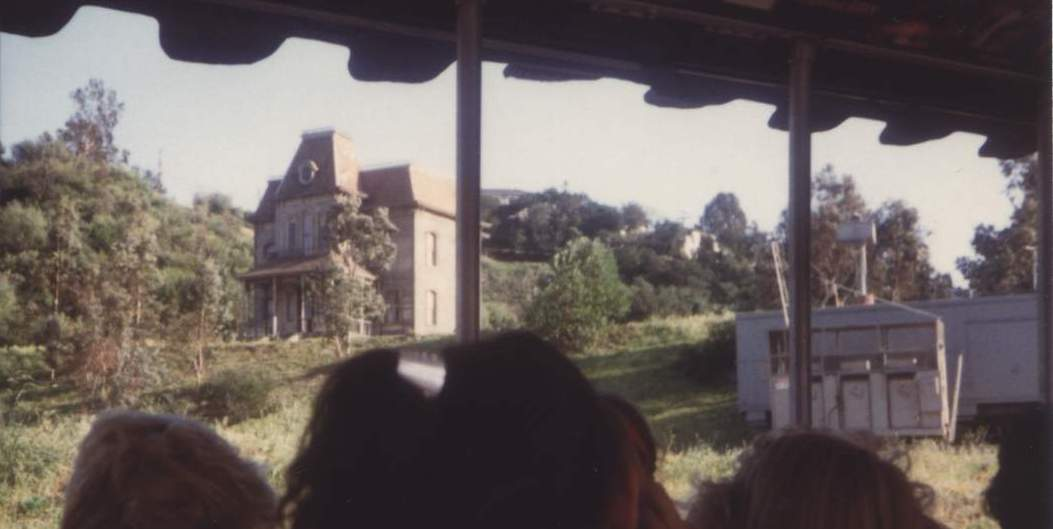
The house used in Alfred Hitchcock's film Psycho (1960), as seen from the tram.

Until June 1, 2008, the tour also passed through a group of facades resembling city streets of New York (used in the filming of Bruce Almighty and some elements in Transformers), Bring It On: In It to Win It, and New England, as well as the Courthouse Square set famously seen in the Back to the Future trilogy. However, these sets were constructed mainly of wood and therefore were highly flammable and burned to the ground in an early morning fire. All the sets have been rebuilt and a new attraction at the Studio features King Kong: 360 3-D, which opened July 1, 2010.

Before returning to the tour's boarding area, the tram passes by an overlook of the San Fernando Valley, which includes views of neighboring Warner Bros. Studios in Burbank.

== Staged events ==
The Studio Tour includes some special demonstrations, as well as some small segments. For example, an encounter with King Kong (King Kong 360), a simulated flash flood, an 8.3 earthquake, and a short encounter with Jaws.

King Kong 360 (2010)

As the tram enters a small set of Skull Island, it passes a crushed tram next to the former Collapsing Bridge on the Studio Tour. After a video introduction by Peter Jackson, the tram enters a cave dressed as a re-creation of Skull Island (formerly guests put on their 3D glasses).

As the tram is transported into the world of King Kong, it arrives in a damp jungle of Skull Island. When someone's phone plays a ringtone in the tram, a pack of Venatosaurus discover the tram and start to chase the tram. The tram speeds away from the raptors in an attempt to escape, but it ends up crashing. The tram slides off the road to a nearby cliffside where it wakes up a group of larger dinosaurs, Vastatosaurus rex, who eats a few of the pack causing the rest to flee.

After the Venatosaurus pack left the tram to be stranded, the V. Rexes begin to attack the tram. But before the V. Rexes can badly damage the tram, King Kong who leaps from behind a temple, comes to the rescue and begins to fight them. The V. Rexes try to attack the tram from both sides, while Kong jumps to each side to defeat them (in the simulator, air and water effects are blown onto guests to further the illusion). Just as the surface battle reaches to its end, a V. Rex somehow breaks the fourth wall (half of its body going offscreen on the far end of the left side of the tram). When it returns onscreen, it reveals that the V. Rex ends up pulling and attacking Car 5 the last car (which is part of the filming segment and a reused joke from the former Collapsing Bridge after the bridge retired) from the tram, and drags the tram down the cliff into a spider pit.

The tram and the V. Rex end up falling into the spider pit. The V. Rex, who is on top of Car 5 attempts to eat the guests from the tram by biting down multiple times as the tram swings between it and some Arachno-Claws. Kong whom jumps into the pit to rescue the tram, faces the V. Rex. Kong eventually jumps onto Car 5 and defeats the V. rex by slamming it into a rock wall multiple times, killing it in the process. Then Kong rescues Car 5, allowing the passengers to survive the fall as the V. Rex falls to its death. The rest of the tram plummets into the bottom of the pit but Kong rescues it as well. He roars in victory, and jumps away, ending the experience. This is the first event and segment that the Studio Tour enters.

Earthquake - The Big One (1989)
The Earthquake event is an 8.3 earthquake inside a soundstage, designed to make it look like a San Francisco subway station. They have a hot set; a hot set is a stage in which various props stay in use and cannot be moved. The attraction features a gimbal which allows it to shake the tram, a burning gasoline truck that collapses through the roof, a crumbling ceiling and floor, electricity, fire, smoke, sparks, a derailing subway train, a flickering lights and a flood of water. The attraction resets itself within just 15 seconds to prepare itself for the next tram-load of guests. In 2024, Earthquake received a big refurbishment which redesigns the subway station from a 1989 subway station into a modern-day subway station introducing new sound effects as part of the 50th anniversary.

Jaws (1976)
As the tram drives into the peaceful Amity seaside town, George, a police driver makes sure there are no problems. But a shark approaches George and kills him in the water. The tram then moves onto a dock where the dock has tilted, nearly plunging the tram guests into the water. The shark ruptures the gas line and the whole dock catches fire. The shark then approaches the tram and tries to attack it as the tram escapes the dock just in time.

The Jaws event opened a year after the release of Steven Spielberg's 1975 film. It is an attraction that features the moving shark anamatronic from the film and other sets. The actual hero prop boat 'Orca' was placed in the lagoon as a center piece, but was removed between 1991 and 1992 and chopped up for timber (Jaws director Steven Spielberg learned of the fate of the 'Orca', much to his anger, after noticing it gone while he was on the ride). The shark as seen in the attraction has had cameos in multiple television shows and films including The Nude Bomb in 1980, the made-for-TV film The Harlem Globetrotters on Gilligan's Island in 1981, the episode "Hooray for Hollywood" from Diff'rent Strokes in 1984, and the episode "Fright Knight" from Knight Rider in 1986. The Amity Harbor/Village area that is associated with the Jaws attraction (minus the moving shark) was the set used in two Airwolf episodes "The American Dream" (Season 2) and "Where Have All the Children Gone" (Season 3).

Flash Flood (1968)

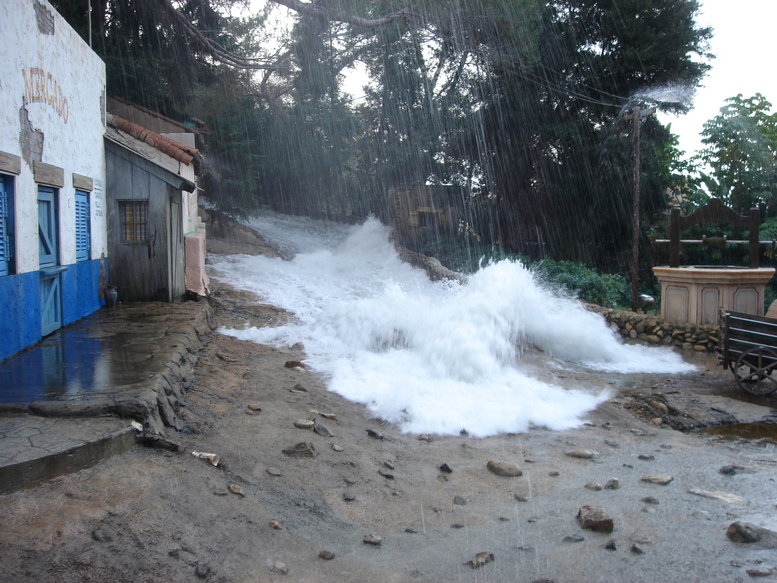
Flash flood attraction on The Studio Tour.

The downhill flood effect has appeared in many films, including Big Fat Liar and Fletch Lives.

Psycho: Bates Motel (2008)
As the tram passes the Bates Motel, the guests witness Norman Bates carrying a corpse to a car. After placing the body in the trunk, he notices the tram and walks towards it with a kitchen knife as the tram leaves just in time to escape. Bates is portrayed by an Anthony Perkins lookalike and on some occasions, a Vince Vaughn lookalike. If the actors are not available, a cardboard cutout of Anthony Perkins as Bates is used in the Cabin 1 window. This event now becomes a temporary photo op area where an original Glamour tram has been restored and other various props for the 60th anniversary of the Studio Tour as well as Norman Bates can randomly meet his guests in a friendly interaction rather than chasing them with his knife.

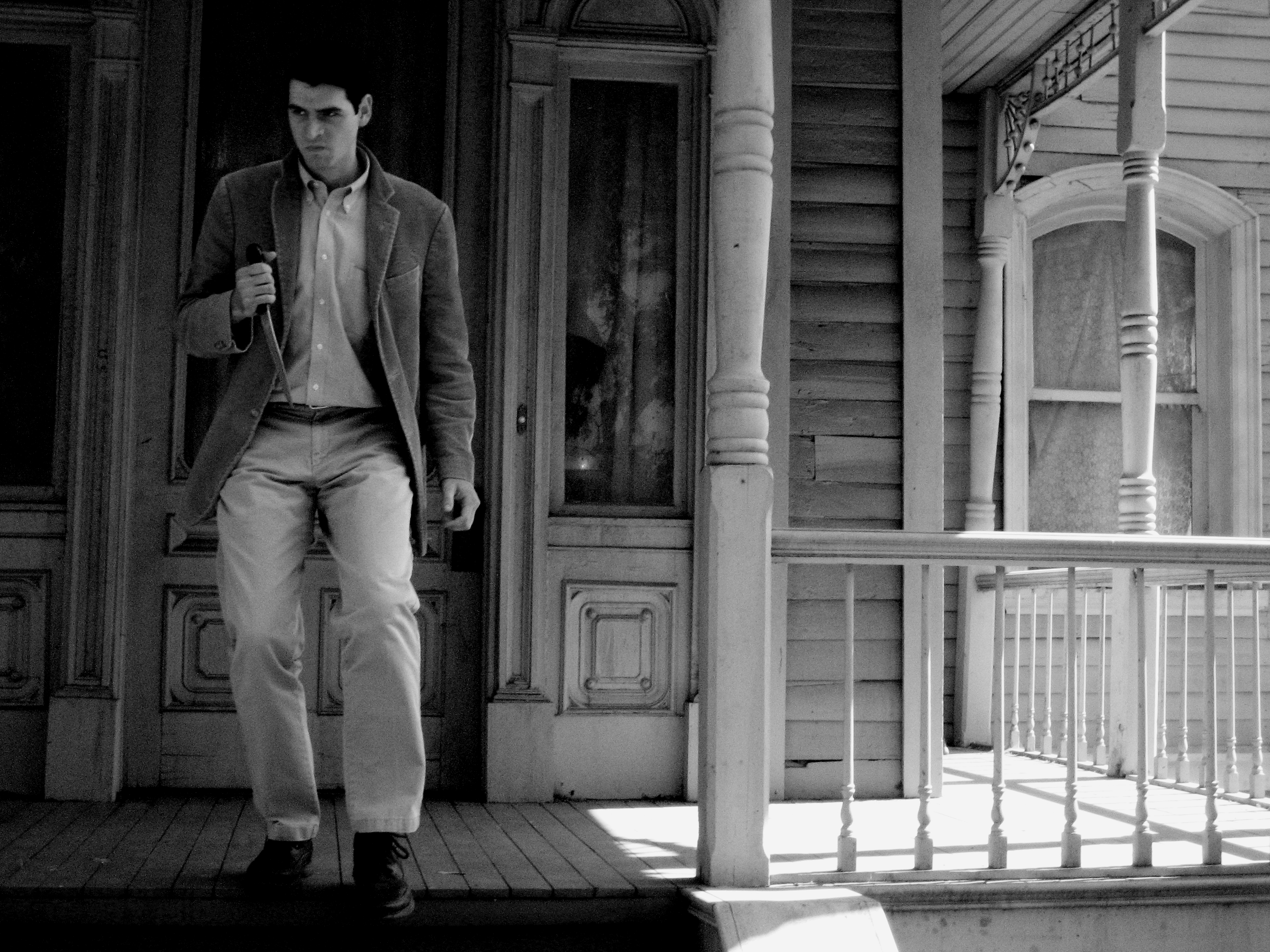
An actor performing as Norman Bates in front of the Bates Mansion as seen during the Psycho section of the Universal Studios Studio Tour in Hollywood.

Psycho: Bates Mansion (1998)
The Psycho House was one of the big draws of the Universal Tram Tour, back in 1964, and has continued to be instantly recognizable in recent years. When trams approach the house, Norman Bates stands at the porch or exits the main door of the house and takes notice of the tram, wherein he brandishes a knife and attempts to attack the spectators.

The idea for having actors dressed as Norman Bates slowly approach the tram came from series of pranks that actor Jim Carrey would do when he was filming the 1999 Andy Kaufman biopic, Man on the Moon. During production in 1998 at an area near the house, Carrey, who portrayed Kaufman in the film, became bored during break hours and tried to channel Kaufman's creative energy by playing Norman Bates. Dressing up in the "mother costume" and wielding a rubber knife, Carrey emerged from behind the Psycho house and jumped on the tram, scaring the passengers, including the guides. The tour guides and tram operators reported the incident to the film crew, who revealed the identity of their attacker. Carrey wanted to repeat the stunt while filming How The Grinch Stole Christmas, filmed behind the house, but this time in full Grinch costume. However, the production kept his costume under wraps until the film's release.

Jupiter's Claim (2022)
A set themed to the western theme park of the same name from the 2022 film, Nope, which is located as the penultimate stop on the tour starting on July 22, 2022, the same day as the film's theatrical release, marking it as the first time that an attraction on the tour has opened day and date with a movie release. Originally created by the film's production designer Ruth DeJong, the set was disassembled during post-production, transported to Universal Studios, and reconstructed on site in the park, with props and details from the film.

== Former events ==
Prop Plaza (1964–1980)
This was a rest area on the lower level of the studio, near Park Lake. It originally featured a collection of oversized props from The Incredible Shrinking Woman, and visitors could disembark the trams to examine them or take photos. Other attractions included a bouncing stagecoach with a motorized backdrop, a concession stand, and a small souvenir shop. When The Six Million Dollar Man was popular, additional attractions included foam boulders and a van raised on two wheels to allow guests to photograph themselves performing "bionic" feats.

Submarine Attack (1971–1990)
As the tram passed by Park Lake, it is shadowed by a black submarine tower breaking over the water's surface. As the tram makes a bend, the submarine fires a "torpedo" at the tram, causing an explosion (actually a pressurized water burst) at the shore's edge.

Avalanche Tunnel (1974–2001)
The tour guide leads the tram into a revolving tunnel, simulating an avalanche, including fake snow spinning around the tram, and damaged signs, along with special sound effects. It was replaced by Curse of the Mummy's Tomb.

Rockslide (1974–1979)
The tram stops inside a rock cliff which begins to collapse. The tram gets past the cliff safely, but not before having a collision with the rocks. The attraction was replaced by Battle of Galactica in 1979.

Runaway Train (1974–1985)
The tour guide leads the tram across a train track, thinking it is safe to cross. However, a train suddenly rushes from the tracks and stops just in time before colliding with the tram. The guide leads the tram away from the tracks to safety. The train is now a stationary train in the backlot.

Battle of Galactica (1979–1992)
This high-technology attraction featuring animatronics and live actors in a spectacular laser battle based on the television series Battlestar Galactica with a 200-foot-long spaceship that "swallowed" the passengers, opened June 9, 1979. This was the first themed attraction to feature Audio-Animatronics characters outside Disney Parks, and was the first dark ride to combine sophisticated animatronics and lasers with live actors. At a cost of $1 million, it was the most expensive special effects attraction ever built at the park at the time. It was replaced in 1992 by the foundations of Back to the Future: The Ride.

King Kong Encounter (1986–2008)

The tram enters 1976 New York City where King Kong is on the loose and grabs and shakes the tram, which eventually escapes his grasp and gets out of the city safely. The 7-ton, 30-foot-tall (9.1 m) Kong figure was the largest and most complex animatronic figure in existence for many years. The sophistication of the attraction broke new ground and paved the way for today's themed attractions, including a Universal Studios Florida version. The Kong sequence was also featured in the film The Wizard starring Fred Savage and Indie singer Jenny Lewis. This attraction opened on June 14, 1986, and was completely destroyed by a fire in the early morning of June 1, 2008. As of June 3, 2008, Universal Studios officials stated that the experience would not be rebuilt, and instead was replaced by the new King Kong: 360 3-D attraction, based on the 2005 film.

Jurassic Park (1996–2024) When the tram passes through the Isla Nublar set, guests are sprayed by animatronic Dilophosaurus. It is very similar to the end of Jurassic Park: The Ride. Prior to the event, the tram also passes props and vehicles from the original Jurassic Park films. This set was then left abandoned after an incident occurred in 2024.

Curse of the Mummy's Tomb (2001–2013)
The tram guide tells guests that they are going to take a look at some props from the film The Mummy, but instead the tram is led into Imhotep's cursed tomb, where he sucks them into a powerful revolving sandstorm. The guide eventually leads the tram out of the sandstorm, and Imhotep is defeated.

The Curse of the Mummy's Tomb closed on September 3, 2013, and was later demolished in the same month. It was confirmed on April 8, 2014, that the site would become home to the new Fast and Furious attraction, replaced by Fast & Furious: Supercharged, which opened on June 25, 2015.

The Fast & The Furious: Extreme Close-Up (2006–2013)

Extreme Close-up demonstrates some of the special effects used in The Fast & The Furious: Tokyo Drift. The attraction started construction in March 2006 and opened on June 15, 2006. The area was formerly occupied by a model used in Dante's Peak.

The section was closed in late July 2013. The studio had become increasingly frustrated with the portrayal of its Fast and Furious franchise at Universal Studios Hollywood after the blockbuster success of the sixth film. This frustration eventually led to the unplanned closure of Fast and Furious on the Studio Tour after producers from the film witnessed the attraction first-hand.

Fast & Furious: Supercharged (2015–2025)

As the tram makes its way past Wisteria Lane, to the left is a black Dodge Charger next to a beige house. The tour guide, who is apologizing for the "unplanned" event, is interrupted by Luke Hobbs, telling guests that they will be sent to a safe location. This is because Owen Shaw and his gang are after a high-valued witness on the tram.

The tram enters the garage and is given an introduction to Roman Pearce and Letty Ortiz, two of the franchise's characters, The tram drives further into the garage, where, using a Pepper's ghost illusion, a party is interrupted by Agent Novak, who escorts the partygoers out of the room. Agent Novak wants to stop Roman, but Dominic Toretto and Letty appear, followed by Hobbs, who has a bigger gun and takes Novak away. Screeching cars in the background alert the team that trouble is ahead.

Studio Tour guests wear 3-D glasses. The team makes way for their vehicles and begins the chase in a parking lot underground, where Owen Shaw appears to seek revenge on Dominic, leading a chase outside on the freeway. It is also the former grand finale of the Studio Tour until its closure in 2025.

The Collapsing Bridge (1974–2006, 2008–2010)
The tour guide tries to take the tram around a bridge rather than going over it, but suddenly the tram driver takes the tram towards the bridge. Just as the tram reaches the midpoint of the bridge, it creaks and massive timbers fall away, causing the bridge to "drop" the tram a short distance. The tram drives on and guests can see the bridge rebuild itself for the next tram.

The bridge was used less-frequently starting in 2005, and by March 2006 was no longer part of the regular tram tour due to mechanical problems. However, the bridge has since undergone renovations, and was added back to the tour schedules in August 2008. The Collapsing Bridge was repaired and returned with a new storyline as part of the Studio Tour in August 2008, after the June fire had closed much of the normal tram route. A portion of the bridge's exit route was replaced by the entrance of King Kong: 360 3-D which is located next to the bridge on July 1, 2010. Since the old exit path was eliminated and a new exit path was built for the tram after exiting the bridge is that it would go behind the new attraction's exit, the two attractions share the same road and route which would have caused traffic bottlenecks to the tours. As a result, the bridge would have to be permanently retired to maintain a continuous flow to the tours, while King Kong: 360 3-D replaced the bridge's original route. Today the bridge itself is still there, but it is no longer operational and cannot be removed due to maintenance costs, and is now a decoration. The current route is blocked by a crushed tram, used as set dressing for the new attraction. Later in late 2021, the crushed tram is removed and the bridge entrance is blocked by a stationary train from the Runaway Train event.

Parting of the Red Sea (1973–2016)
The guide leads the tram to a body of water. Suddenly, the waves part, and the tram travels between them. Prior to addition of miniature models of Skull Island and the S.S. Venture boat from the King Kong remake in 2006, guides informed guests that the waterfall effect was originally installed for the "parting of the Red Sea" scene from The Ten Commandments. The surrounding pond was also featured as part of the film set from Creature from the Black Lagoon. For many years a mock-up of The Creature stood in the pond.

Whoville Comes To Life (2008–2016)
During the holiday season, at the Whoville set all of the Whos, even Max the dog, perform a musical spectacular for the guests' enjoyment. The songs are remixes of songs from the movie. This is part of Universal's Grinchmas celebration.

In 2017, with the addition of "The Magic of Christmas at Hogwarts Castle" projection mapping and fireworks show in the Wizarding World of Harry Potter, Whoville Comes To Life was closed to appease nearby neighbors who would frequently complain about noise caused by the Whoville show and the extended Studio Tour hours.

In 2020, during the COVID-19 closure of Universal Studios Hollywood, the Whoville Sets were demolished and replaced with picture cars seen in Universal films and in the theme park.

== Photo gallery ==
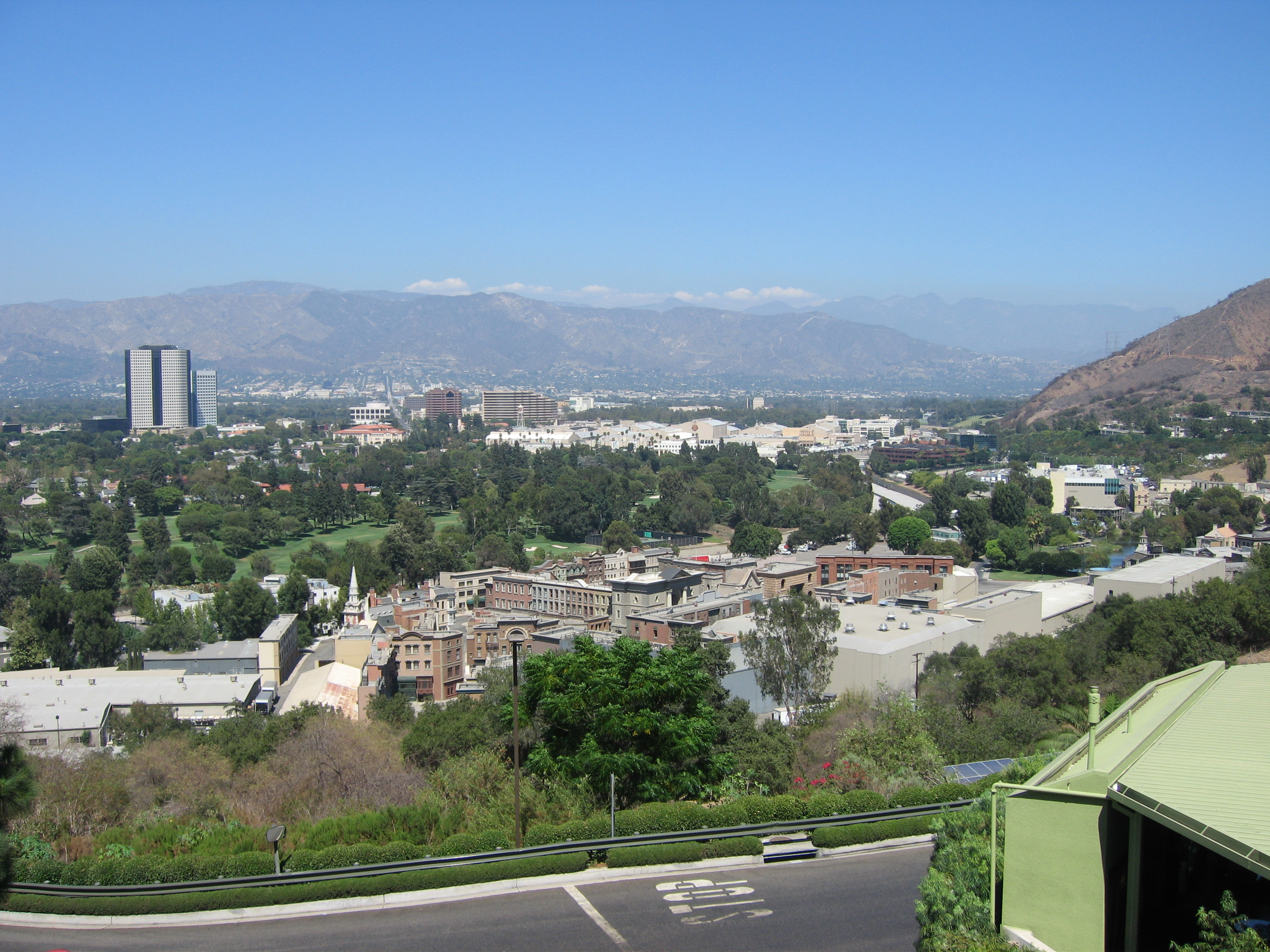
Backlot.

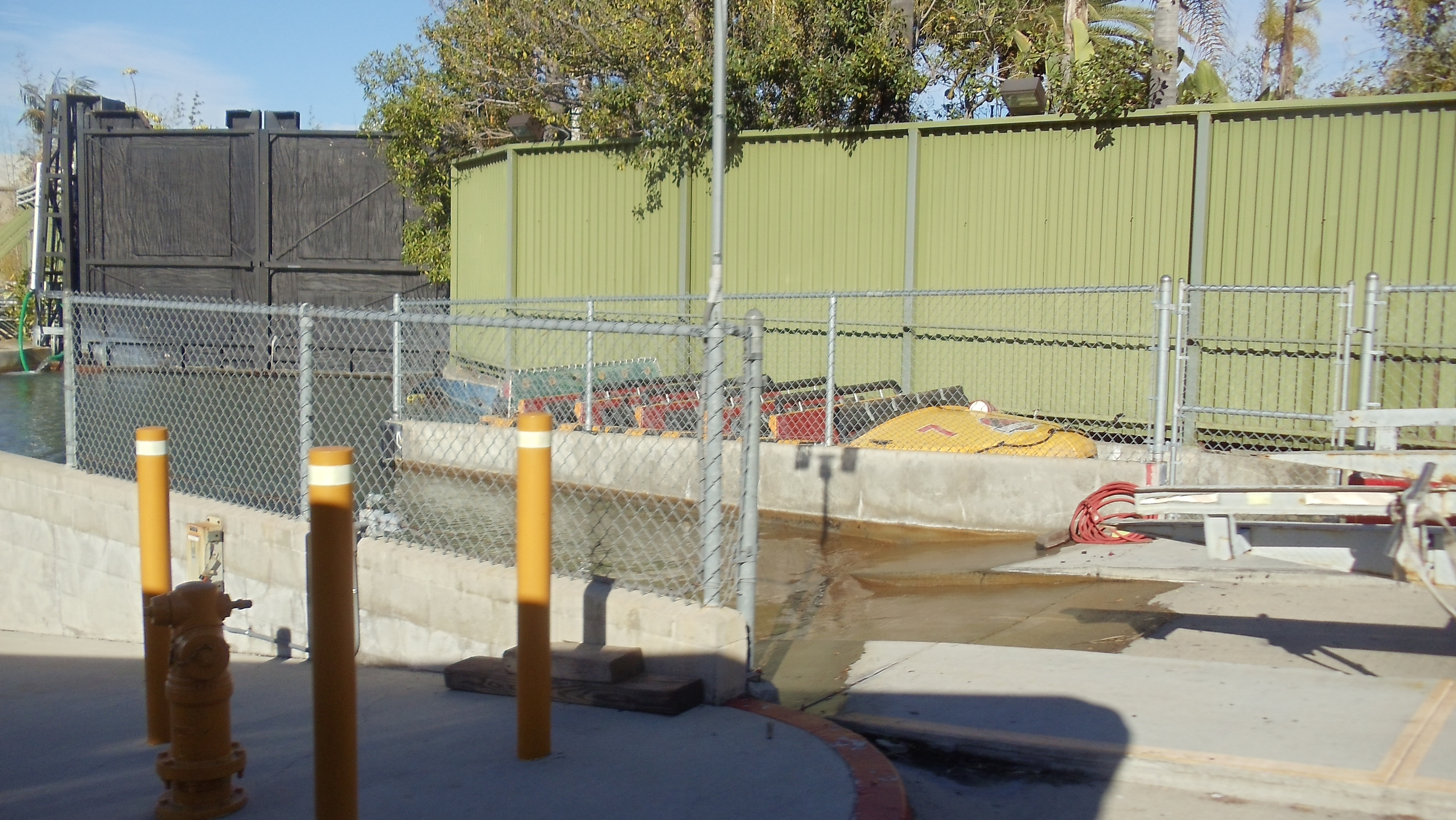
Maintenance area of Jurassic Park the ride.

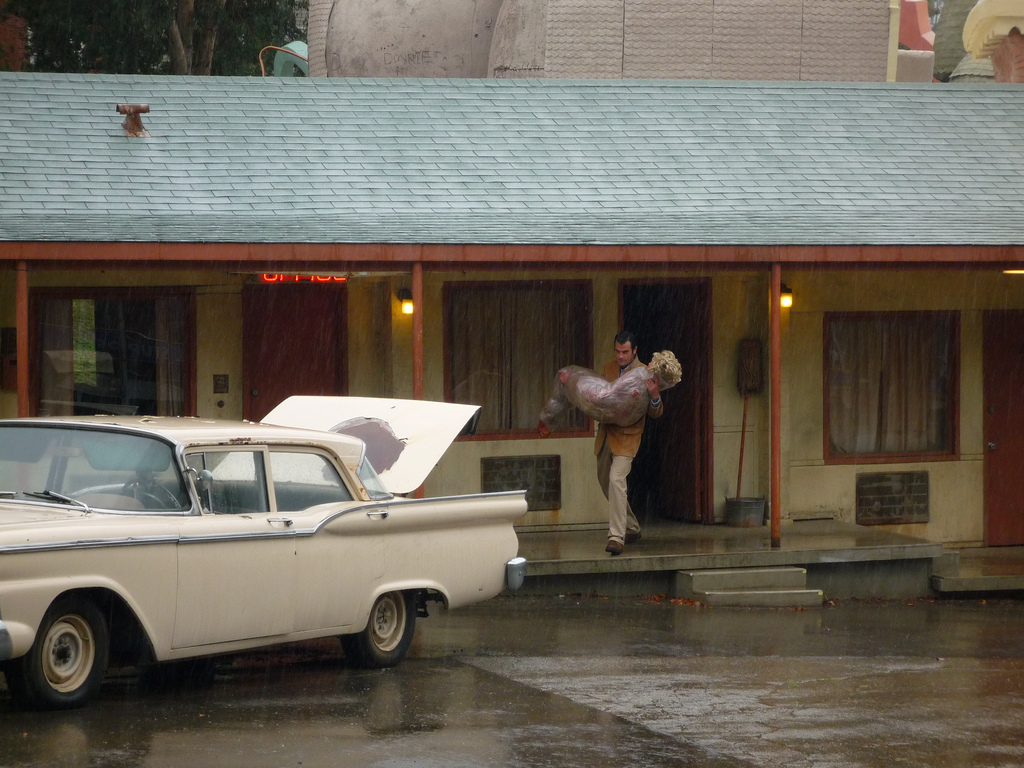
An actor playing Norman Bates carrying a corpse from the Bates Motel on the Studio Tour.

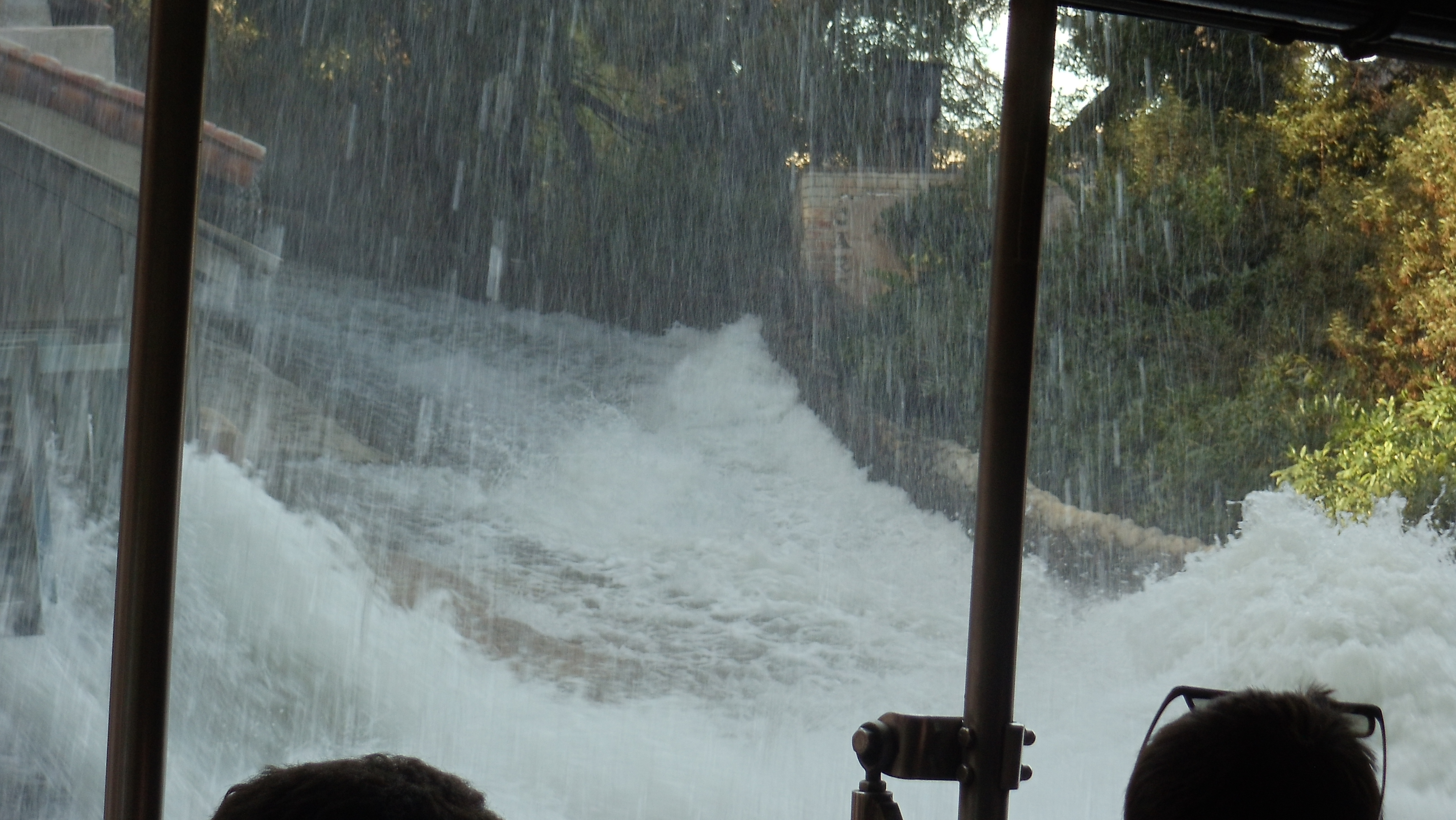
Flash flood scene of the Studio Tour ride.

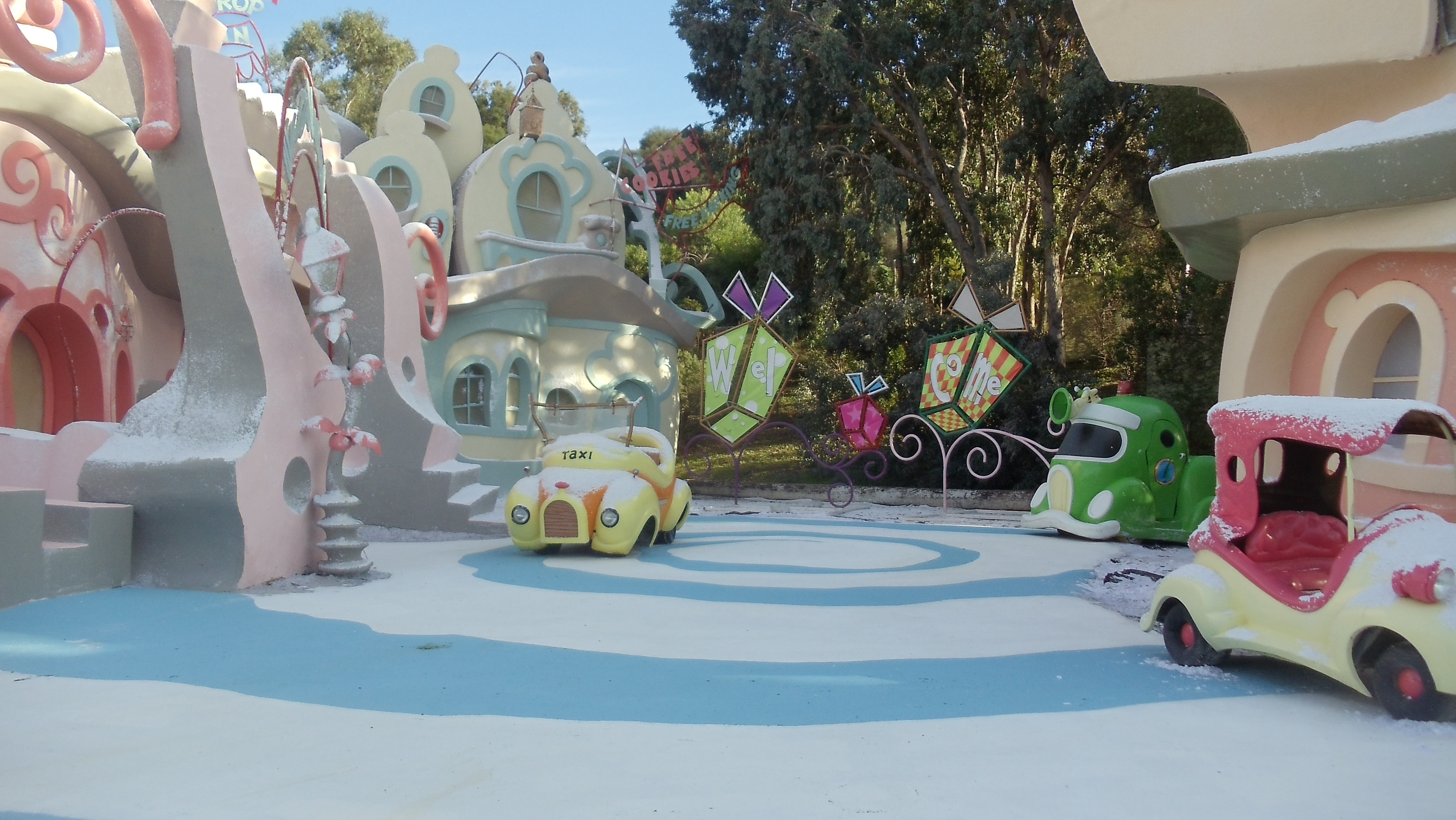
Grinchmas scene of the Studio Tour ride.

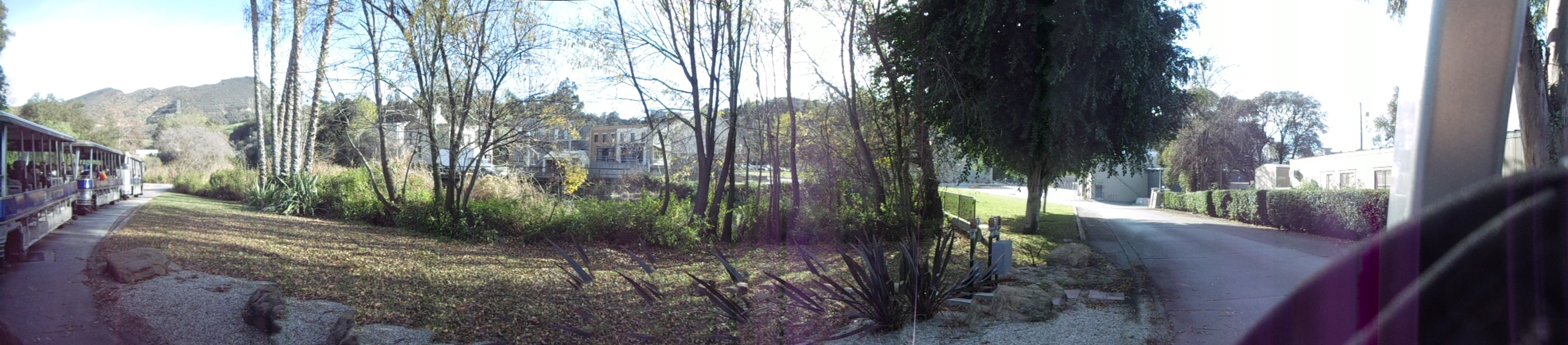
Lagoon scene at the Studio Tour ride.

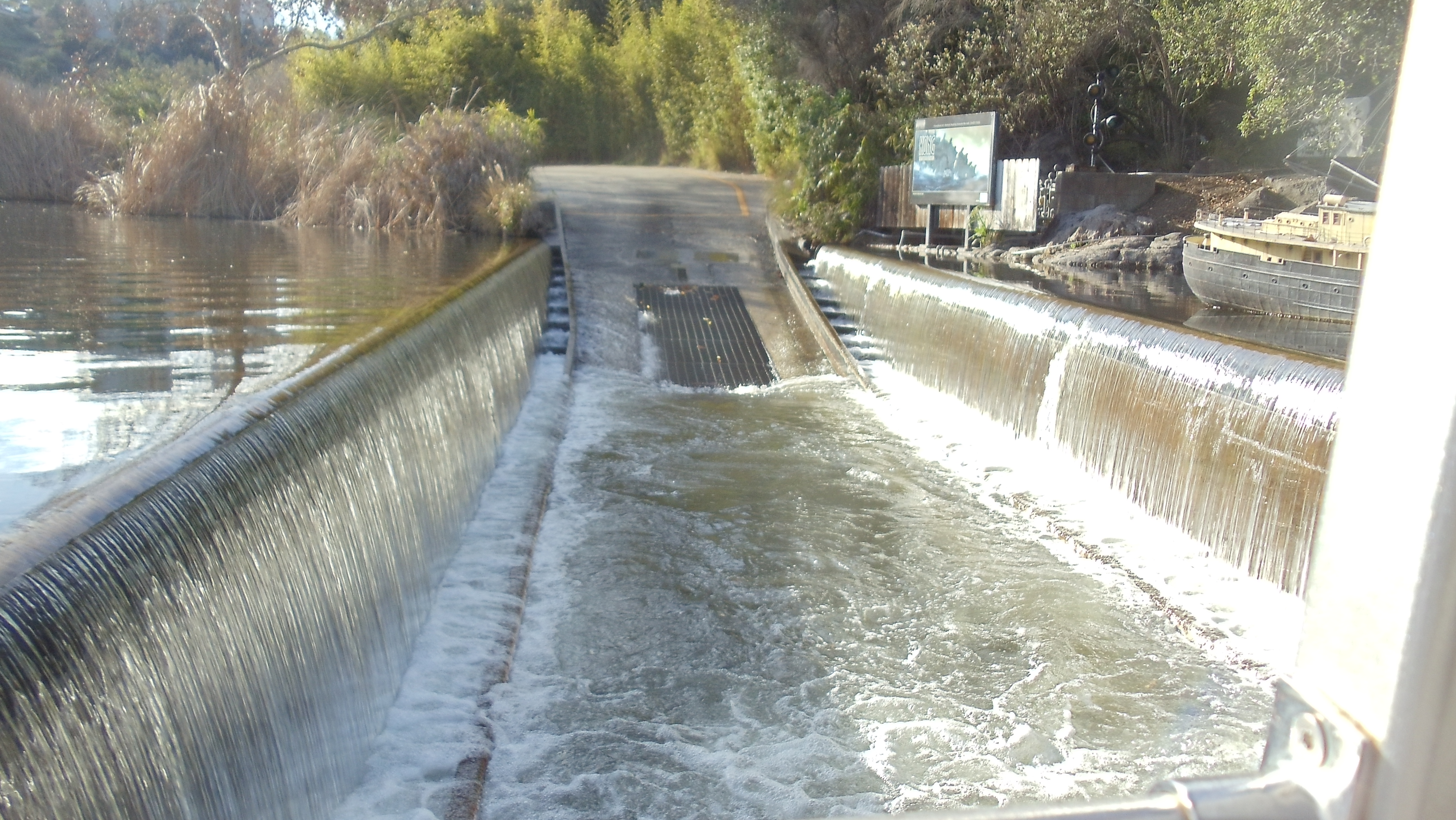
Water effect scene as part of the Studio Tour ride.

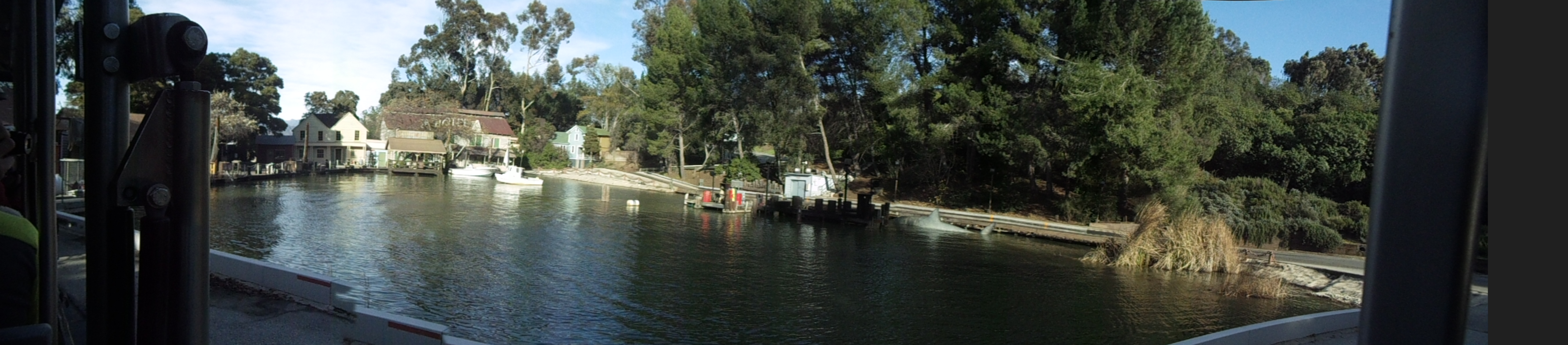
Panorama picture of the Jaws shark scene.

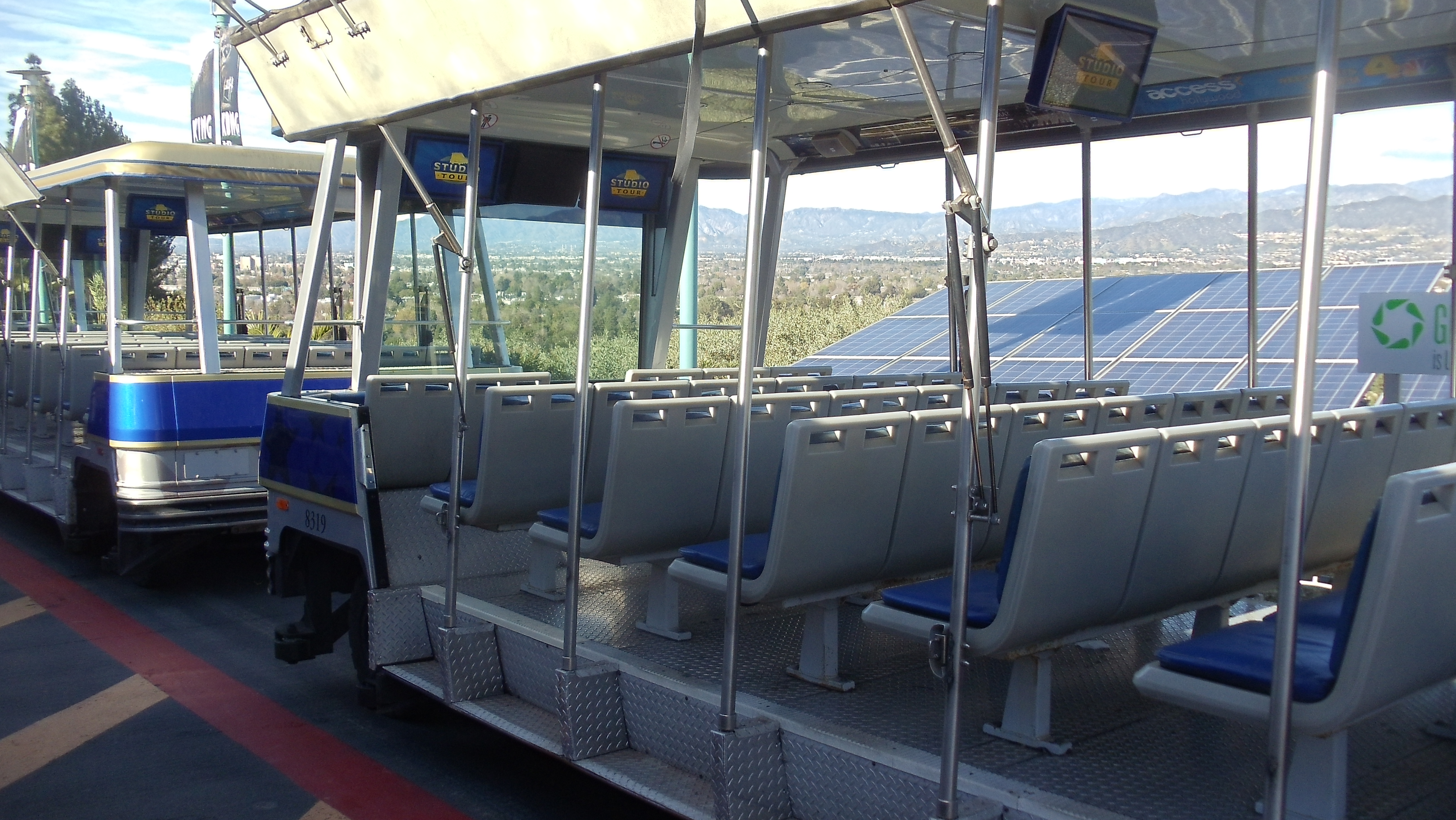
The 45 minute Studio Tour ride uses tram cars. The tram cars are operated by a driver.

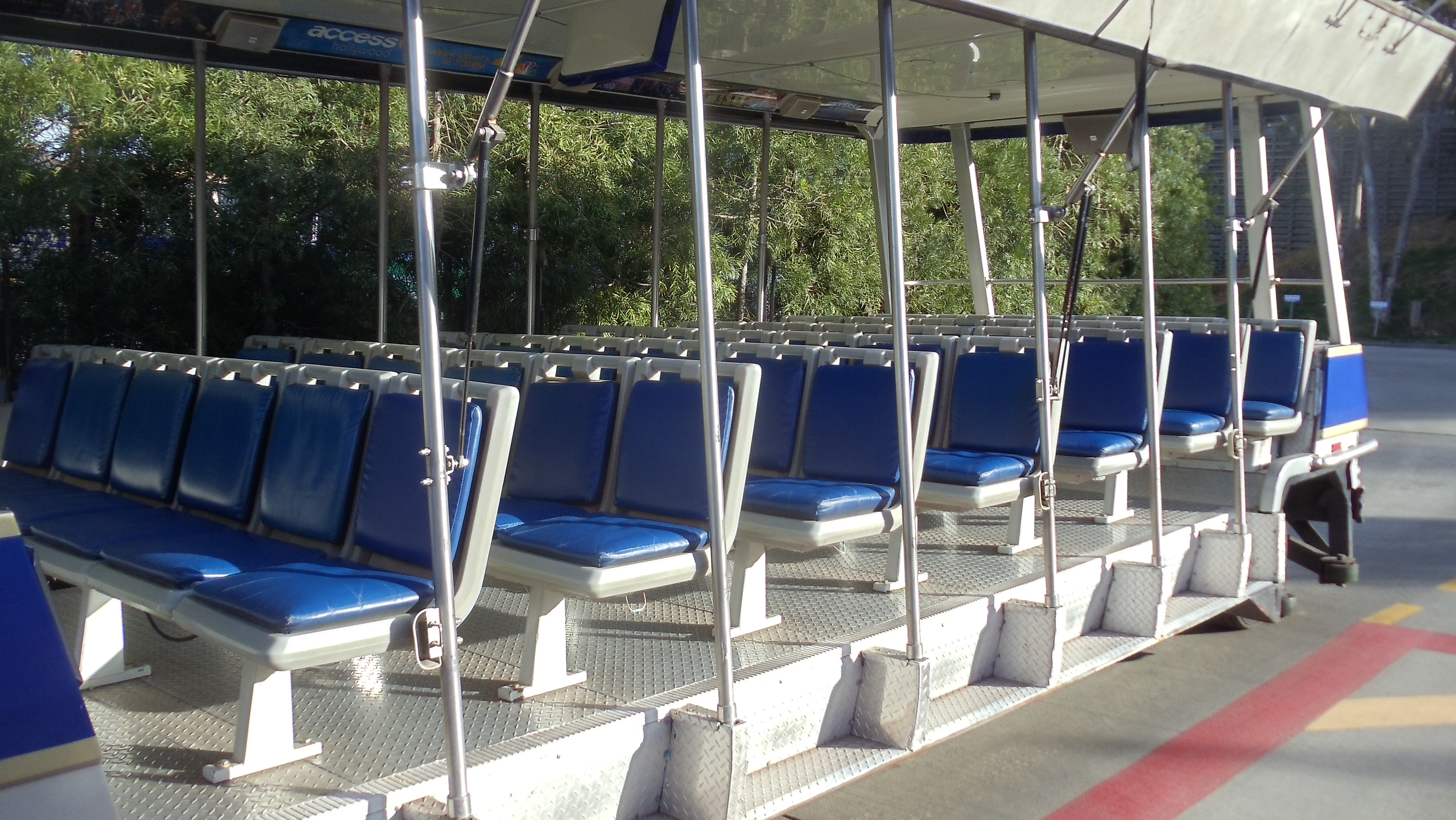
The Studio tram fills 6 visitors per row. Small children are typically seated in the middle of the tram and not at the sides of the tram for safety reasons. Typically, older children and adults sit at the sides of the tram.

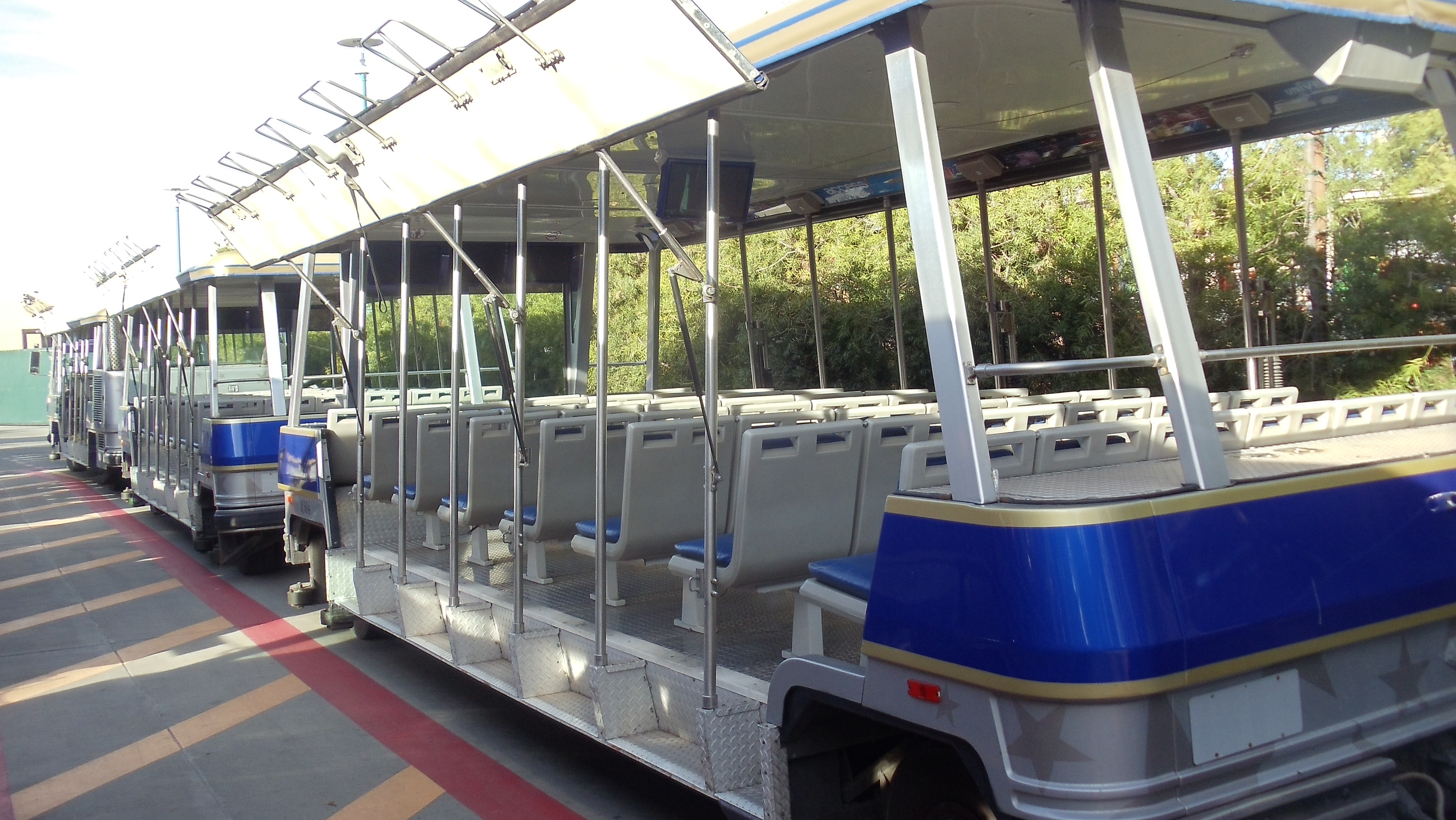
The studio tram tour ride typically operates with 3-4 cars, depending on the operating day and season. Ride operators will typically fill up all of the seats of the tram cars.

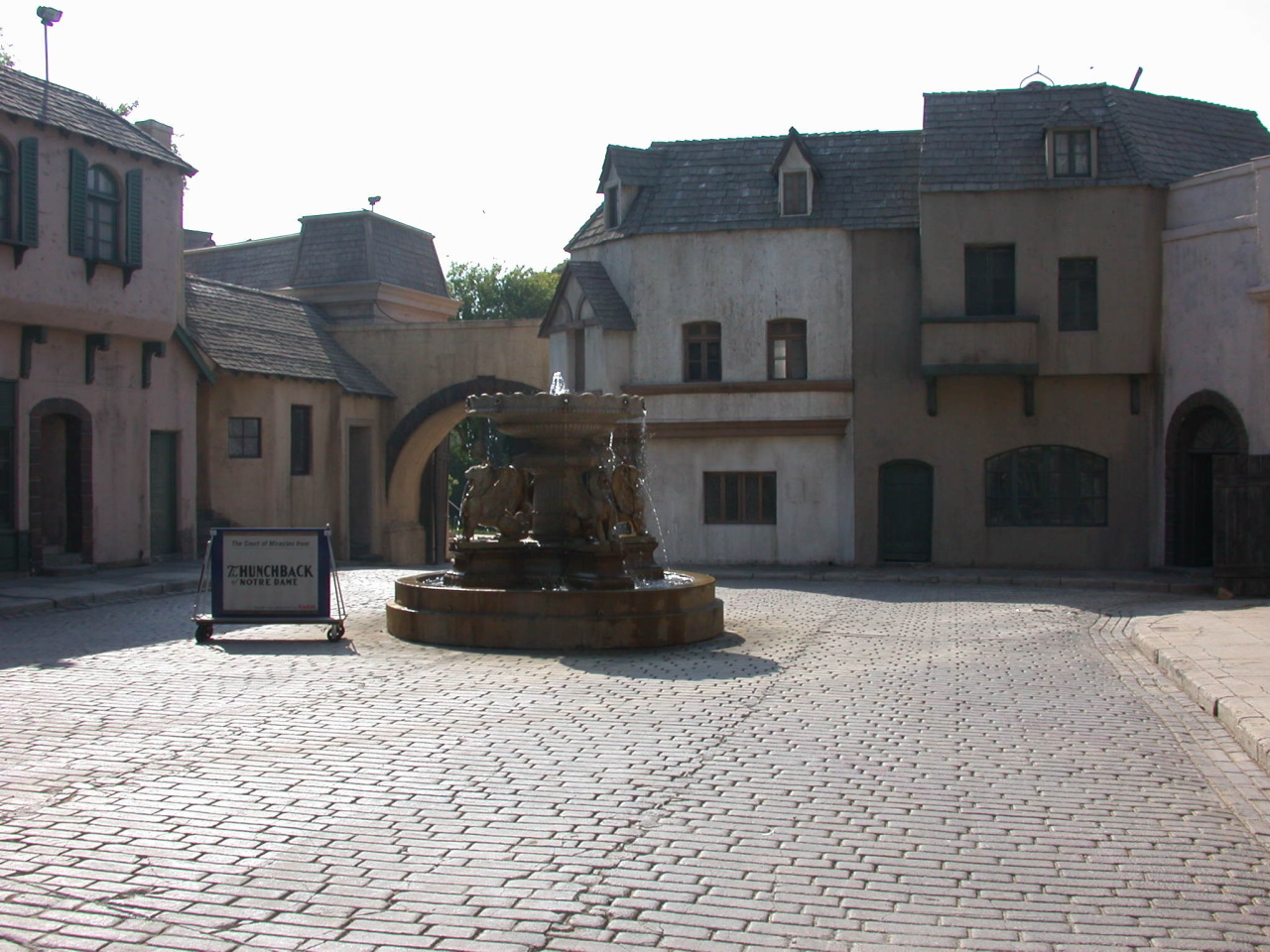
"The Court of Miracles" named for The Miracle Man (1919). Also used in The Hunchback of Notre Dame (1923), Frankenstein (1931), many others

== See also ==
- Universal Studios Studio Tour (Florida)
- Studio Backlot Tour and Studio Tram Tour: Behind the Magic, a similar attractions at both Disney's Hollywood Studios and Walt Disney Studios Park that eventually got demolished in 2016 and 2020, respectively.
