= Geraldine Brooks (actress) =

American actress (1925–1977)

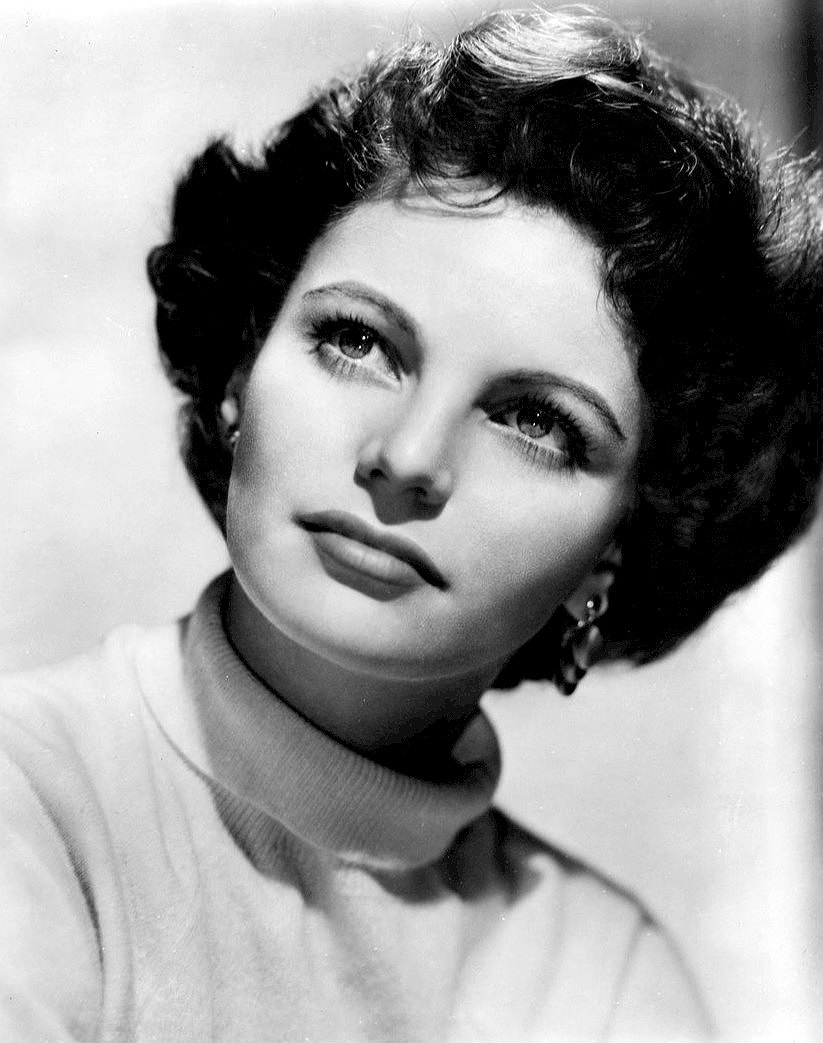
- Brooks in 1955
- Born: Geraldine Stroock; October 29, 1925; New York City, NY, U.S.
- Died: June 19, 1977 (aged 51); Riverhead, New York, U.S.
- Years active: 1947–1976
- Spouses: Herb Sargent (m. 1958; div. 1961) Budd Schulberg (m. 1964)
- Relatives: Gloria Stroock (sister)

Geraldine Brooks (born Geraldine Stroock; October 29, 1925 – June 19, 1977) was an American actress whose three-decade career on stage, as well as in films and on television, was noted with nominations for an Emmy in 1962 and a Tony in 1970. She was married to author Budd Schulberg.

== Early life ==
Brooks was born Geraldine Stroock in New York City to a family descended from Dutch immigrants. Her parents had connections in the entertainment industry, with father, James, the owner-manager of a theatrical costume company and her mother, Bianca, a stylist and costume designer. Two of her aunts had also been in show business, one as a singer at the Metropolitan Opera and another as a showgirl with the Ziegfeld Follies. Her elder sister, Gloria, was an actress. Geraldine, who was named after Metropolitan Opera's most famous diva of the era, Geraldine Farrar, took dancing classes from the age of two and attended the all-girls Hunter Modeling School and graduated in 1942 from Julia Richman High School, where she was president of the drama club.

== Career ==
=== Debut ===
The World War II years of 1942–45 found Geraldine Stroock refining her craft at such traditional venues as the American Academy of Dramatic Arts, the Neighborhood Playhouse, and summer stock. Her first Broadway show, Follow the Girls, a musical comedy, opened at the New Century Theatre on April 8, 1944, and ran for 888 performances, closing over two years later, on May 18, 1946. The young actress, who was 18 when she was cast in this tuneful spoof of life in the theatre, played a character tellingly named "Catherine Pepburn". She did not stay with the production for its entire run, but was subsequently cast in another Broadway show, The Winter's Tale. This Theatre Guild production of the Shakespeare romance opened at the Cort Theatre on January 15, 1946, and closed after 39 performances on February 16. Playing the female lead, Perdita, the now-20-year-old actress was noticed by a Warner Bros. representative and signed to a contract.

=== Warner Bros. contract player and freelance ===
Unlike her elder sister, Gloria Stroock, who had a long career as an actress in mostly small film and television roles under her real name, young Geraldine decided at this point to take the surname of "Brooks" professionally. That name was also the name of her father's costume company. Her debut under the new stage name was also her first time in front of the cameras, as the studio's suspense drama, Cry Wolf, went into national release on August 19, 1947, although it was seen and reviewed in New York one month earlier. Billed third after top-tier stars Errol Flynn and Barbara Stanwyck she received mostly good notices, while the film itself encountered critical resistance, with The New York Times critic Bosley Crowther complaining that "[t]he final explanation of the mystery is ridiculous and banal." Her second film at the studio, Possessed, was released three weeks before Cry Wolf, on July 26, and was, again, reviewed in New York earlier, on May 30. This time, she was in fourth place, behind top-tier stars Joan Crawford and Van Heflin and third-billed Raymond Massey. A much more vulnerable persona than the poised, imperturbable one she played in Cry Wolf, she had a number of heavy dramatic confrontations with the overwrought character played by Joan Crawford (who received an Oscar nomination for the role) and became a lifelong friend of the eighteen-years-older star, and spoke at her memorial service in May 1977, five weeks before her own death. Seeing the young actress for the first time in the latter film, Bosley Crowther described her as "a newcomer who burns brightly ... as Miss Crawford's sensitive step-daughter".

In her third film, Warners allowed its new contract player to rise to the level of a co-star. Embraceable You, released in July 1948, had her second-billed to Dane Clark, who played a goodhearted, although criminally inclined, tough guy who falls in love with the victim of the hit-and-run car accident for which he was responsible. There was no happy ending for the two doomed protagonists, and the film, structured as a second feature, was little-noticed and went unreviewed in The New York Times. After one more film, The Younger Brothers, a color Western not released until May 1949, in which she was, again, in fourth place, following Wayne Morris, Janis Paige and Bruce Bennett, Brooks asked for, and received, a release from her studio contract in July 1948, after two years and four films.

Now a freelancer, she had a strong fourth-billed (following Fredric March, Edmond O'Brien and Florence Eldridge) dramatic role in Universal Pictures' An Act of Murder, playing the daughter of March and Eldridge, who were married in real life, and the anguish that the husband, a judge, endures when he contemplates ending the life of his terminally ill wife. It was released in December 1948, but the downbeat film, although receiving positive notices, was not a financial success.

For The Reckless Moment (1949), directed by Max Ophuls, she was third-billed behind James Mason and Joan Bennett. Brooks, aged 24, was cast as Bennett's 17-year-old daughter, whose reckless affair with a seedy, older art dealer puts her mother on a collision course with a blackmailer with worse to come. The Columbia film was released in December 1949, a year after her previous screen appearance in An Act of Murder. Her final American film of the 1940s, Challenge to Lassie was made in Technicolor at MGM. Released two months earlier, in October, but not seen in New York until April 1950, the production gave her third billing, behind Edmund Gwenn and Donald Crisp who, in this version of the classic story, Greyfriars Bobby, were once again typecast as elderly Scotsmen. Playing the cemetery caretaker's daughter, she had the only female role of any importance, and was also given a couple of good dramatic scenes, but the focus was still firmly on the canine star.

Her later film appearances were few but included roles in Johnny Tiger (1966) starring Robert Taylor, and Mr. Ricco (1975), opposite Dean Martin.

=== Foreign films ===
In mid-1949, with no immediate movie or stage prospects, Geraldine Brooks accepted an offer from Italian production and distribution companies, Itala Film and Artisti Associati, for roles in two projects to be filmed on location, co-starring top native-born romantic leading men, Rossano Brazzi and Vittorio Gassman. Similar in tone, both are doom-laden melodramas depicting the tragic price women paid for descending into prostitution in the midst of the hunger, deprivation, and moral corruption prevailing in postwar Italy. The first (released in the United States three years later as Streets of Sorrow) gave her, for the only time, top billing, as a prostitute making her living in the streets, who desperately and tragically attempts to prevent the handsome magistrate, played by Vittorio Gassman, who falls in love with her, from learning of her profession. Three years later, with the film finally receiving a shortened and censored U.S. release, A. H. Weiler noted in his November 1952 New York Times review that "Geraldine Brooks, an expatriate American who has emoted in more than one Italian film, gallantly tries to make a wistful and convincing heroine of Maria, the prostitute grasping desperately for a chance at decency". He described the film, however, as "a sad and limp romance, which is trite, slightly lachrymose and largely unedifying".

The second title, Vulcano (later released in the U.S. as Volcano), had an Oscar-nominated (for 1937's The Life of Emile Zola) director, William Dieterle, and two top Italian stars, Anna Magnani and Rossano Brazzi, who were billed above her. The adventurous shoot was primarily confined to the land and sea area around the eponymous volcanic isle of Vulcano as well as Lipari, off the coast of Mediterranean's largest island, Sicily. Upon returning to Hollywood in October 1949, Dieterle told The New York Times that "[C]onditions for shooting a picture could hardly have been more primitive. Except for the mechanical equipment we took with us, we had to construct everything we needed with our own hands." The film restores Brooks to her familiar role of an innocent ingenue taken advantage of by an unscrupulous exploiter of women, played by Brazzi, while her older sister, played by Anna Magnani, returns to the island of their birth, burned out after having worked for 18 years as a prostitute in Naples. As in the case of Streets of Sorrow, this production was also censored and released in the United States years after filming. In its June 1953 review, Time magazine noted that although it is "[R]eminiscent in story and treatment of Stromboli, Volcano is a far better film. Against the island's rough backdrop, the yarn's primitive passions do not seem particularly excessive or out of place".

=== 1950s, 1960s, and 1970s television ===
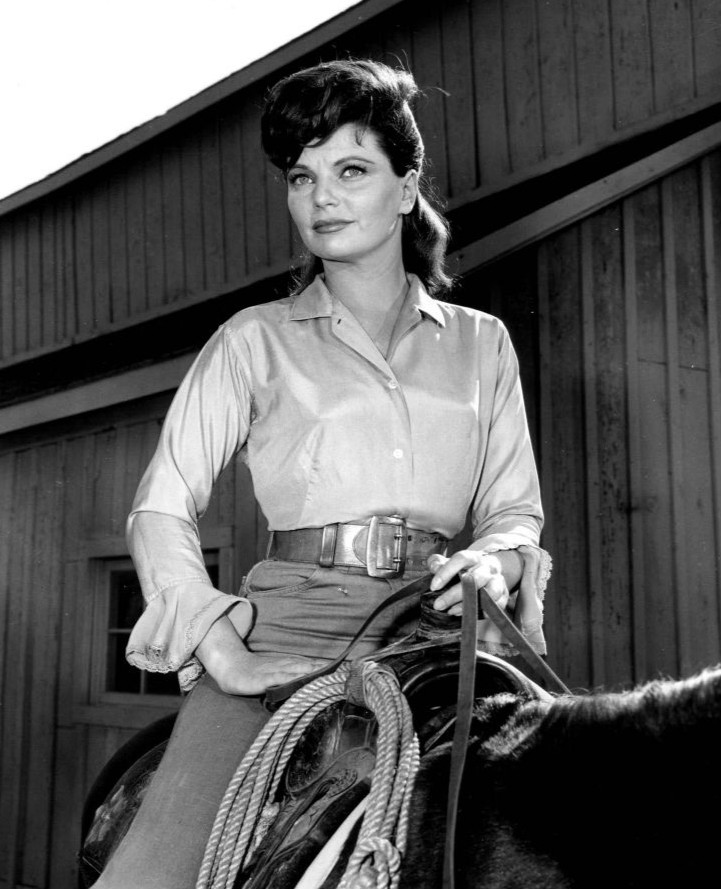
Guest starring on The Virginian, 1962

In 1952, she co-starred in the film noir The Green Glove with Glenn Ford. Brooks and Ford had a torrid affair during the production of the film on location in Paris.

She was again on Broadway in The Time of the Cuckoo in 1952, and in 1970 she was nominated for the Tony Award for Best Performance by a Leading actress in a Play for Brightower, which closed after its opening night performance. Brooks appeared mostly on television after 1950.

She appeared in many of the anthology series popular early in the decade, such as Orient Express, Armstrong Circle Theatre, Appointment with Adventure (two episodes), Lux Video Theatre, and Studio One.

Brooks guest starred on Richard Diamond, Private Detective, and The Fugitive, both starring David Janssen. Her other credits included Johnny Staccato, Have Gun - Will Travel, Adventures in Paradise, Perry Mason, Ironside, The Defenders, Dr. Kildare, Stoney Burke, Mr. Novak, Ben Casey, Get Smart, Gunsmoke (in the 1966 episode "Killer at Large"), The Outer Limits, Combat! (in the episode "The Walking Wounded").

She played Carol Attley, a potential love interest for Hoss in "To Bloom for Thee" S8 E6 of Bonanza which aired 10/15/1966, as well as appearing in It Takes A Thief, Daniel Boone and Kung Fu (in the episode "Nine Lives"). She played the role of Arden Dellacorte in 1971 on the CBS daytime soap opera Love of Life and starred as the overweight owner of a delicatessen opposite James Coco in the short-lived 1976 situation comedy The Dumplings, her final role. Geraldine Brooks also appeared in Barnaby Jones, playing a character named Janet Enright in the 1973 episode "The Murdering Class".

She was nominated for the 1962 Emmy Award for Outstanding Single Performance by an actress in a Leading Role for her appearance in the episode, "Call Back Yesterday", with fellow guest costar David Hedison in the drama series Bus Stop.

== Personal life ==
Brooks married screenwriter and producer Herb Sargent in 1958; the couple was divorced in 1961. She married screenwriter, producer, and writer Budd Schulberg in 1964.

She died of a heart attack in 1977 while undergoing treatment for cancer at Central Suffolk Hospital in Riverhead, New York. She was 51 but the obituary in The New York Times listed her age as 52. Her interment was in Mount Sinai, New York's cemetery, Washington Memorial Park.

== Filmography ==
Year	Title	Role	Notes
1947	Possessed	Carol Graham	
1947	Cry Wolf	Julie Demarest	
1948	Embraceable You	Marie Willens	
1948	An Act of Murder	Ellie Cooke	
1949	The Younger Brothers	Mary Hathaway	
1949	The Reckless Moment	Beatrice 'Bea' Harper	
1949	Challenge to Lassie	Susan Brown	
1950	Ho sognato il paradiso (English title: Streets of Sorrow)	Maria	
1950	Volcano	Maria, Maddalena's sister	
1952	The Green Glove	Christine 'Chris' Kenneth	
1957	Street of Sinners	Terry	
1961–1966	Bonanza	Elizabeth Stoddard Cartwright / Carol Attley	2 episodes
1962	Perry Mason	Miriam Waters	Season 5 Episode 29
1963	The Outer Limits	Yvette Leighton	Episode: "The Architects of Fear"
1963	The Virginian	Georgia Price	Episode: "Duel at Shiloh"
1963	Combat!	Nurse Lt. Ann Hunter	Episode: "The Walking Wounded"
1964	The Outer Limits	Ann Barton	Episode: "Cold Hands, Warm Heart"
1965	Daniel Boone	Esther Craig	Episode: “The First Stone”
1965	The Fugitive	Lucia Mayfield	Episode: "Everybody Gets Hit in the Mouth Sometime"
1966	Johnny Tiger	Dr. Leslie Frost	
1966	Gunsmoke	Esther Harris	Episode: "Killer at Large"
1967	The High Chaparral	Fay Leyton	Episode: "The Price of Revenge"
1972	Ironside	Marty Booth	TV movie, in syndication, 2 Part Episode: "Buddy, Can You Spare a Life?"
1973	Kung Fu	Widdaw Tackaberry	Episode: "Nine Lives"
1975	Mr. Ricco	Katherine Fremont	
1975	Ellery Queen	Tilda McDonald	Episode: "The Adventure of the Chinese Dog"

== Awards and nominations ==
- 1962 Emmy Award nomination: Outstanding Single Performance by an actor in a Leading Role – Geraldine Brooks, Bus Stop, ABC
- 1970 Tony Award nomination: actor (Play) – Geraldine Brooks, Brightower
