= Embraceable You (film) =

1948 film

- Directed by: Felix Jacoves
- Written by: Aleck Block (story); Dietrich V. Hannekin (story); Edna Anhalt
- Produced by: Saul Elkins
- Starring: Dane Clark; Geraldine Brooks
- Cinematography: Carl E. Guthrie
- Edited by: Thomas Reilly
- Music by: William Lava
- Production company: Warner Bros. Pictures
- Distributed by: Warner Bros. Pictures
- Release date: 1948
- Running time: 80 minutes
- Country: United States
- Language: English

Embraceable You is a 1948 romantic drama film starring Dane Clark and Geraldine Brooks, and directed by Felix Jacoves.

== Plot ==
The film opens with a montage of New York's buildings and skyline before an announcer states "Warner Brothers presents."

In New York City, after gambler Sig Kelch shoots a crooked poker player, the getaway car driven by Eddie Novoc strikes Marie Willens. Although Eddie is shaken by the big accident, Kelch insists that he keep driving. Later, a concerned Eddie visits Marie at the hospital, pretending to be a friend of her brother.

Police detective Ferris becomes interested in Marie's visitor after she tells him that she has no brother. Then Dr. Wirth discovers that Marie has an inoperable, fatal aneurism caused by the accident. Because nothing can be done for Marie, Wirth decides not to tell her that she is going to die. When she learns she is to be released from the hospital, a distraught Marie tells Ferris that she has lost her job and is locked out of her apartment. The next time Eddie visits Marie, Wirth tells him about her condition. Outside the hospital, Ferris informs him that, although he cannot prove it, he knows that Eddie was driving the car that hit Marie and orders him to take care of her until she dies. After failing to get the necessary money from Kelch, Eddie sells his car in order to rent Marie an apartment. Marie is delighted with her new home and calls her friend Libby to ask for help finding a job. Libby's agent, Matt Hethron, agrees to see Marie, but while demonstrating her specialty, a tap dance, she collapses.

Eddie pawns his watch and then blackmails Kelch for enough money to support Marie, but soon realizes that Kelch's men are after him. With Ferris' help, Eddie plots to leave town with Marie. Having evaded Kelch and his men, Marie and Eddie live an idyllic life in the country until Marie's worsening attacks leave her unable to walk. Eddie summons Wirth, who finally tells Marie the truth about her condition. Now that Marie knows she is going to die, she asks Eddie to marry her. When he refuses, even though he loves her, Marie realizes that he was the person who caused the accident. She forgives him, however, and they agree to marry. In the city, Kelch's men have been watching Eddie's friend Sammy, and when one notices Eddie and Marie's names written on a wedding cake that Sammy has made, they follow him to the couple's hideout in the country. Unknown to Kelch, however, Ferris' men have also been watching Sammy's shop, and when Kelch tries to shoot Eddie, Ferris kills him first. Now that Ferris has resolved the gambler's murder, he wants to take Eddie to jail for the hit-and-run accident. Eddie begs to be allowed to marry Marie and to make her happy for the short time she has left to live. At first Ferris is unwilling, but persuaded by Eddie's love for Marie, finally agrees. After the wedding Marie asks Eddie to make believe that the marriage "is forever." Eddie kisses her and vows, "It is forever."

== Cast ==
- Dane Clark as Eddie Novoc
- Geraldine Brooks as Marie Willens
- S. Z. Sakall as Sammy
- Wallace Ford as Police Lieutenant Ferria
- Richard Rober as Sig Ketch
- Lina Romay as Libby Dennis
- Douglas Kennedy as Dr. Wirth
- Mary Stuart as Miss Purdy
- Philip Van Zandt as Matt Hethron
- Dave Barry as The Comic
- Rod Rogers as Bernie Sallin
