= Johnny Tiger =

1966 film by Paul Wendkos

- Theatrical Film Poster
- Directed by: Paul Wendkos
- Written by: Thomas Blackburn; Paul Crabtree; Philip Wylie; R. John Hugh (story "Tiger on the Inside")
- Produced by: R. John Hugh
- Starring: Robert Taylor; Chad Everett; Geraldine Brooks
- Music by: Johnny Green
- Production company: Nova-Hugh Productions
- Distributed by: Universal Studios
- Release date: June 15, 1966
- Running time: 102 minutes
- Country: United States
- Language: English

Johnny Tiger (1966) is a Florida Western film directed by Paul Wendkos, starring Robert Taylor, Chad Everett, and Geraldine Brooks.

The Universal Studios film was shot in Central Florida in 1965, with the city of Longwood, Florida substituting for a fictional town in southern Florida adjacent to a Seminole Indian reservation, with additional filming at nearby Sanlando Springs. Indoor scenes were filmed at Shamrock Studios, formerly on Nicolet Ave in Winter Park. Originally titled The Cry of Laughing Owls, the film's title was changed to Johnny Tiger prior to its release. It had its world premiere in Orlando, Florida in 1966.

== Plot ==
A drama about the conflict between traditional and Americanized Seminoles impacted by a dedicated white teacher on their ways of life. A widowed schoolteacher (Robert Taylor) arrives at a Seminole Reservation in the Florida Everglades with his three children. He's determined to bring the Indians into the modern world of the 20th century, but his contempt for their ways meets with resistance.

George Dean (Robert Taylor), a widowed professor shunned by various colleges and universities because of his reputed arrogance, arrives with his three children at a Florida Indian reservation to teach the Seminoles. Appalled by the dilapidated schoolhouse, he appeals in vain to Dr. Leslie Frost (Geraldine Brooks), the resident public health official.

One day Dean's 19-year-old daughter, Barbara (Brenda Scott), is rescued from a herd of stampeding bulls by Johnny Tiger (Chad Everett), the young grandson of the local Seminole chief, Sam Tiger. Observing that the Indian children idolize Johnny, Dean asks him to encourage the youngsters to attend school. But Johnny mocks him and bitterly states that he is only a half-breed Seminole whose mother was a white woman and local barmaid.

Realizing that Johnny, despite his hostility, is a man of innate intelligence, Dean urges him to attend school. Mainly because of Barbara, Johnny agrees; but the old Seminole chief, Sam Tiger, insists that Johnny abandon the white man's ways and leave the reservation. Caught in the conflict, Johnny and Barbara run off to get married. Tension between Dean and Sam mounts until a brush fire on the reservation entraps Dean's young son. Risking his life, Dean races into the fire and finds the old chief holding the child protectively in a wet blanket. Badly burned, Sam Tiger asks Dean to give him back his grandson. Now tolerant of other men's beliefs, Dean accompanies Johnny to the Indian burial ground. There Johnny promises his dying grandfather to lead his people in the new ways he has learned.

== Cast ==
- Robert Taylor as George Dean
- Geraldine Brooks as Dr. Leslie Frost
- Chad Everett as Johnny Tiger
- Brenda Scott as Barbara Dean
- Marc Lawrence as William Billie
- Ford Rainey as Sam Tiger

== See also ==
- List of American films of 1966
