= The Green Glove =

1952 film by Rudolph Maté

- Theatrical release poster
- Directed by: Rudolph Maté
- Screenplay by: Charles Bennett
- Story by: Charles Bennett
- Produced by: Georges Maurer
- Starring: Glenn Ford; Geraldine Brooks; Sir Cedric Hardwicke
- Narrated by: John Dehner
- Cinematography: Claude Renoir
- Edited by: Lola Barache; Louis Sackin
- Music by: Joseph Kosma
- Color process: Black and white
- Production companies: Benagoss Productions; Union Générale Cinématographique
- Distributed by: United Artists
- Release dates: January 31, 1952 (premiere-Los Angeles); February 28, 1952 (wide release)
- Running time: 89 minutes
- Countries: France; United States
- Languages: French; English

The Green Glove (aka The White Road) is a 1952 French-American international co-production film noir directed by Rudolph Maté and starring Glenn Ford, Geraldine Brooks, Sir Cedric Hardwicke and George Macready.

== Plot ==
The film opens with a teaser showing the end of the story. The priest of St. Elzear hears the church bells ringing, which (a narrator tells us) weren't supposed to ring until the Gauntlet of St. Elzear, the "green glove" that was the object of pilgrimages by "the sick, the maimed and the faithful" had been returned. He runs to the church, doesn't see the gauntlet in its place, then runs up the bell tower, on the level just below the bells finding a dead man. At the top, the bells are ringing but no one is ringing them. He runs back down and this time the gauntlet is in its rightful place. Villagers join him in the church and he and others go back to the dead man. Wondering who he is, he finds a jacket with a designer tag from Los Angeles and concludes he's an American (a foreshadowing suggestion to the viewer that the dead man is Blake, the only American in the film).

The scene shifts to (the narrator says) the beginning of the story when American paratrooper Mike Blake is trapped in German territory. Wandering through ruins he encounters "Count" Paul Rona who's carrying a valise. Blake thinks he's a German but Rona says he's a reporter, and that the Germans will mount a major attack in the morning. Blake makes Rona empty the valise, and when Rona brings out the green glove he says he's actually an art dealer, and offers to give Blake the bejeweled glove, which he says is worth a fortune, if Blake will let him go. Just then a bomb dropped from a plane explodes close enough to knock Blake out and knock the valise out of Rona's hands. Rona takes off running without the valise.

Blake is found by the Countess, a young man named Armond and Pierre her butler. The Countess wants to take Blake to her home, to which Blake agrees only after Armond promises to get word to the Americans about the coming German attack. The next morning Blake finds the Countess celebrating the retreat of the Germans, until Armond is carried in, having died trying to get word out about the German attack, which has turned out to be a deception of Rona's. Armond's death sends the Countess into shock and she's no longer able to speak. As Blake is leaving, Pierre shows him the valise, which he assumes is his. Blake decides it would be better to leave it, and Pierre says he'll keep it so Blake can come back for it later.

A few years later Blake arrives in Paris, on his way (the narrator tells us) to retrieve the glove, since things haven't gone well for him back in the States. A man is following him, and on the Eiffel Tower he enlists the help of Chris Kenneth, who's giving a guided tour, to help him elude his tail. That night he runs into Chris in a night club and they hit it off. They go back to his hotel where he's met by Inspector Faubert, who questions him about a man found dead in his room, with a drawing of Blake in his pocket. The dead man is the man who was trailing Blake, and Blake and Chris admit having seen the man on the Eiffel Tower. The Inspector tells Blake he wants to talk to him again, but when Blake finds Faubert will be out of town for five days he decides to leave town and leaves a note for Faubert in his room telling him what he's done.

Blake is trailed to the train station by a man who later turns out to be the police. Chris is waiting for him on the train, having been to his room and seen the note he left for Faubert, and tells him he shouldn't be running from the police. They're still talking when the train starts and he has to buy a ticket for her. They leave the train shortly before it gets to Monte Carlo and the policeman tailing him is shot by another man, who turns out to be a henchman of Rona's named Pepe.

Blake and Chris go to the Countess's château and find it damaged and deserted, but Rona is waiting there. He tells them he had Blake watched in the States, and that the man found dead in Blake's hotel room worked for him but was looking to double cross him. He says the police believe Blake killed the man in his hotel room and the policeman on the train, and that he wants the green glove. Blake fights Pepe and manages to escape. Faubert then shows up with a number of officers (having been tipped off by a local that Blake was there) but is too late to catch anyone.

Chris gets away as well, and she and Blake are discovered by the Countess and Pierre, who take the couple to a small nearby house where they now live. The Countess talks about Armond returning soon and Pierre tells Blake she's lost her reason and still believes Armond is alive. Pierre has kept the valise and gives it to Blake, who opens it to find the green glove. The Countess sees it and recognizes it as the gauntlet of St. Elzear. She takes it, falls to her knees and holds it to her cheek, then faints, still clutching it. When she's revived she has miraculously recovered her faculties and understands that Armond is dead.

Blake and Chris leave, and Chris says she was ready to marry Blake but isn't so sure if he's going to sell the glove. They go to an inn and have a romantic interlude, during which Blake decides he values Chris over the money he can get for the glove. They decide to go to Monte Carlo separately to avoid being caught, then meet up, but when Chris gets to Monte Carlo Blake phones her to say he wants her to find Rona in the casino that evening and tell him that Blake is going to return the glove to the church. Then she's to call Faubert and tell him to send his men to the church, so that Rona can be caught there with the glove.

Blake is walking on the road to the church when a group of Rona's men stop by in a car. Hiding, he hears the leader tell the other men to walk the rest of the way so Blake won't hear them coming in the car, while he waits for Rona. When Rona arrives he tells his man to drive to the village, and that he will take "the goat track" to the village to "close the trap." Blake, hiding at the beginning of the goat track, is forced to hurry along the mountain trail to stay ahead of the armed Rona, and just manages to get to the village alive.

He enters the church and heads up the bell tower with Rona right behind. Near the top he removes his jacket and throws it at Rona, and as Rona throws it off, one of Rona's men starts shooting at Blake, but with his second shot hits Rona. Blake starts ringing the bells, causing Rona's men to leave and the priest and the villagers to run to the church. As the priest reaches the bells Blake goes down another way, and on his way out leaves the glove in its proper place. Blake leaves by a back door and the opening scene with the priest telling the villagers what happened is repeated: the gauntlet has been returned and the bells were ringing, but no one was there to ring them.

The police arrive and Chris gets out of Faubert's car, runs to Blake, embraces him and says the police followed her and found her with Pepe. Faubert says they've caught Rona's men and one of them has confessed, so he knows Blake's innocent. Chris and Blake walk off with the church bells ringing again.

== Cast ==
- Glenn Ford as Michael 'Mike' Blake
- Geraldine Brooks as Christine 'Chris' Kenneth
- Sir Cedric Hardwicke as Father Goron
- George Macready as Count Paul Rona
- Gaby André as Gaby Saunders
- Jany Holt as The Countess
- Roger Tréville as Police Insp. Faubert
- Georges Tabet as Jacques Piotet
- Meg Lemonnier as Madame Piotet
- Paul Bonifas as Inspector
- Jean Bretonnière as Singer

== Background ==
The movie was shot mostly on location in southern France and Monaco. It was based on actions that took place during Operation Dragoon.

== Soundtrack ==
L'Amour est parti
Written by Joseph Kosma
Lyrics by Henri Bassis
Sung by Juliette Gréco

Romance
Written by Joseph Kosma
Lyrics by Henri Bassis
Sung by Juliette Gréco

== Reception ==
=== Critical response ===
When the film was first released in 1952, film critic Bosley Crowther expected a first-rate production given that, the screenplay writer, Charles Bennett, had written films "of a high order" such as The 39 Steps. However, he found The Green Glove "is not in that echelon, but is merely a standard chase after a medieval, bejewelled gauntlet filched from a rural French church." He continued, "... but the tale spun is minor-league melodrama. Glenn Ford is largely listless as the paratrooper who clashed with a collaborator-art dealer during the war ..."

Film critic Dennis Schwartz was disappointed in the film, yet praised the work of Glenn Ford. He wrote, "Rudolph Maté (D.O.A./Union Station/Miracle in the Rain) directs this standard thriller, that has a few twists but bogs down over too many hysterical melodramatic moments and the unbelievability of the characters and story line. It's weakly scripted by Charles Bennett and is based on his novel ... There's a good story here, but too bad it wasn't told convincingly and the featured sudden romance came about so quickly that it was not possible for me to believe it; nor was I able to find the suspense story even close to the way a top-notch director like Hitchcock would have built up the suspense and made things more exciting (If not convinced then perhaps check out The 39 Steps, directed by Hitchcock and also written by Bennett!). The former cinematographer Maté can't keep things real and all the plot points seem nothing short of schematic. But Glenn Ford is in it, and he's so good in these type of adventure roles that he at least keeps the flawed pic entertaining."

== Comic book adaptation ==
- Eastern Color Movie Love #15 (June 1952)

== See also ==
- List of films in the public domain in the United States
