= Universal Studios Lot =

Television and film studio complex in Universal City, California

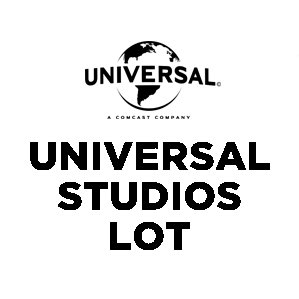

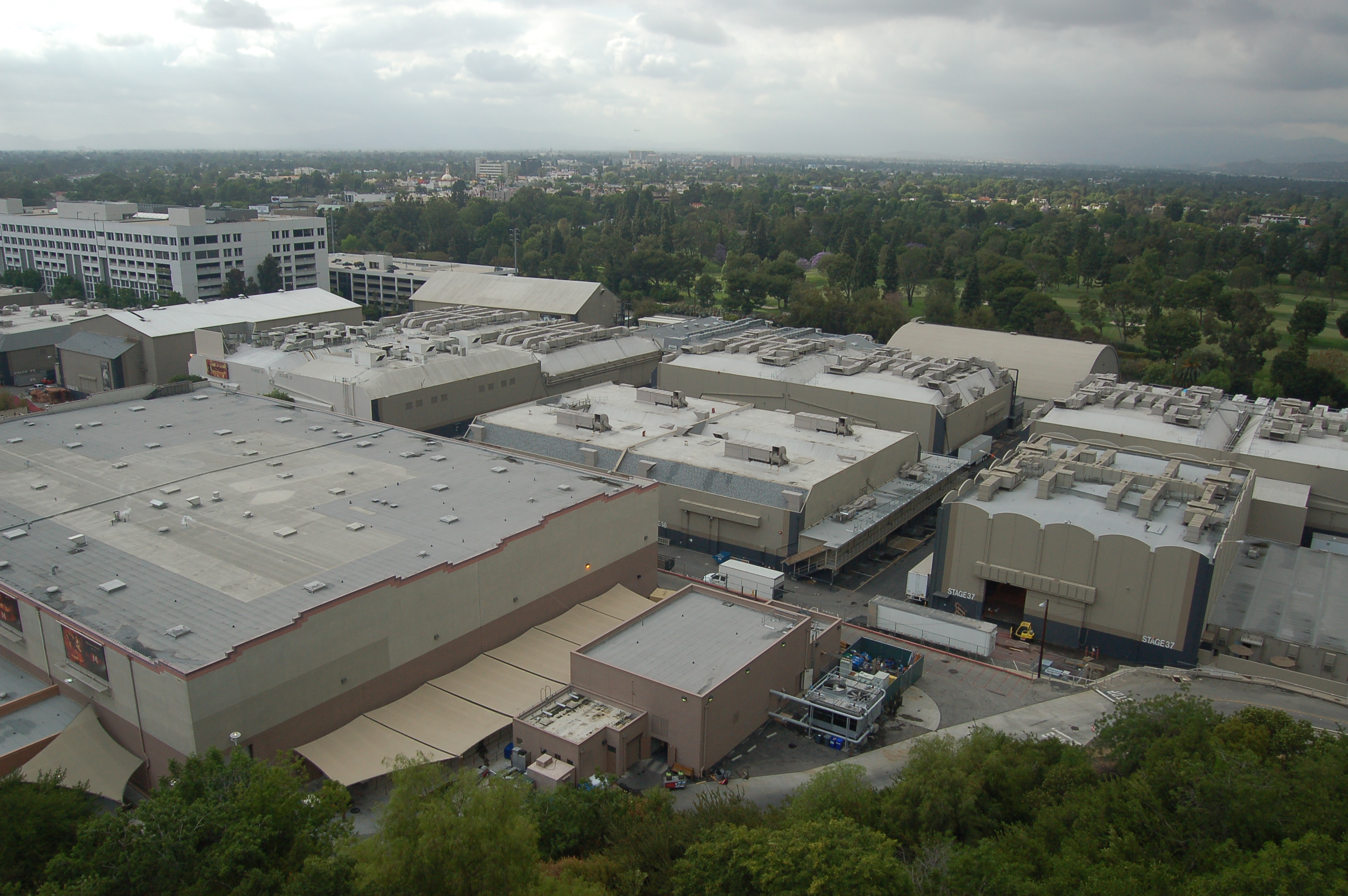
- View over the backlot soundstages of Universal Studios Lot

General information
- Type: Film and television complex
- Location: Universal City, California, 100 Universal City Plaza
- Current tenants: Universal Filmed Entertainment Group; Universal Pictures; NBC; KNBC
- Inaugurated: March 15, 1915; 111 years ago
- Owner: Universal Filmed Entertainment Group (NBCUniversal/Comcast)

Website
- https://www.universalstudioslot.com

Universal Studios Lot is a television and film studio complex located at 100 Universal City Plaza in Universal City, California, United States. It is part of the entire Universal Studios complex, which includes the adjacent Universal Studios Hollywood theme park. It is the production site of Universal Filmed Entertainment Group and is owned by Comcast through its subsidiary NBCUniversal. The lot officially opened the gates of Universal City on March 15, 1915. The lot began offering its modern studio tour in 1964, which evolved into the Universal Studios Hollywood theme park. The Universal Studios Lot is made up of 400 acres (160 ha), which includes more than 30 sound stages, the Brokaw News Center which houses television broadcasting and production facilities for KNBC and KVEA along with serving as a bureau for NBC News, and 165 other separate structures.

== Background ==
On March 15, 1915, Carl Laemmle opened Universal City Studios on a 230-acre ranch (93 ha) in the San Fernando Valley and called it Universal City. The site became known as Universal Studios Lot and Universal City was considered the first self-contained community dedicated to making films.

In 1950, Universal Studios Lot increased its overall size to 400 acres (160 ha) after Universal acquired additional land at the southern border of the studio. Music Corporation of America (MCA) bought the Universal Studios Lot in 1958. Universal then leased back its property from MCA until MCA and Universal merged in 1962.

Shortly after the MCA–Universal Pictures merger, accountants suggested that a new tour in the studio commissary would increase profits. On July 15, 1964, the modern Universal Studios tour was established to include a series of dressing room walk-throughs, peeks at actual production, and later, staged events. This grew over the years into a full-blown theme park now known as Universal Studios Hollywood.

Over the next decades, numerous television shows and movies were filmed in Universal Studios Lot, notably at the Courthouse Square and Colonial Street sets. This includes Psycho (Paramount Pictures), Back to the Future (Universal Pictures), The Perfect Storm (Warner Bros.), War of the Worlds (Paramount Pictures/DreamWorks), Desperate Housewives (ABC), and The Good Place (NBC). Today, Universal Studios Lot is one of the largest full-service production facilities. It has continued to modernize and grow with plans to expand by adding additional soundstages and building facilities.

In October 2007, NBC announced plans to move most of its operations from its Burbank studio. It retained offices at the Burbank site until May 2013, though the Burbank studio complex was sold to Catalina/Worthe Real Estate Group in 2008, with NBCUniversal leasing space until 2013. The former Technicolor building on the Universal lot now serves as the home of NBC's West Coast operations. By 2014, NBC had relocated their west coast production operations to the Universal lot including their NBC News and Noticias Telemundo bureaus and local production operations for KNBC and KVEA. Their newly-constructed news center was also named the Brokaw News Center in honor of former NBC Nightly News anchor Tom Brokaw.

Since 2016, the NBC show American Ninja Warrior has filmed their Los Angeles city qualifiers and finals courses on the lot. The Universal Studios Lot is planned to be the venue for squash at the 2028 Summer Olympics.

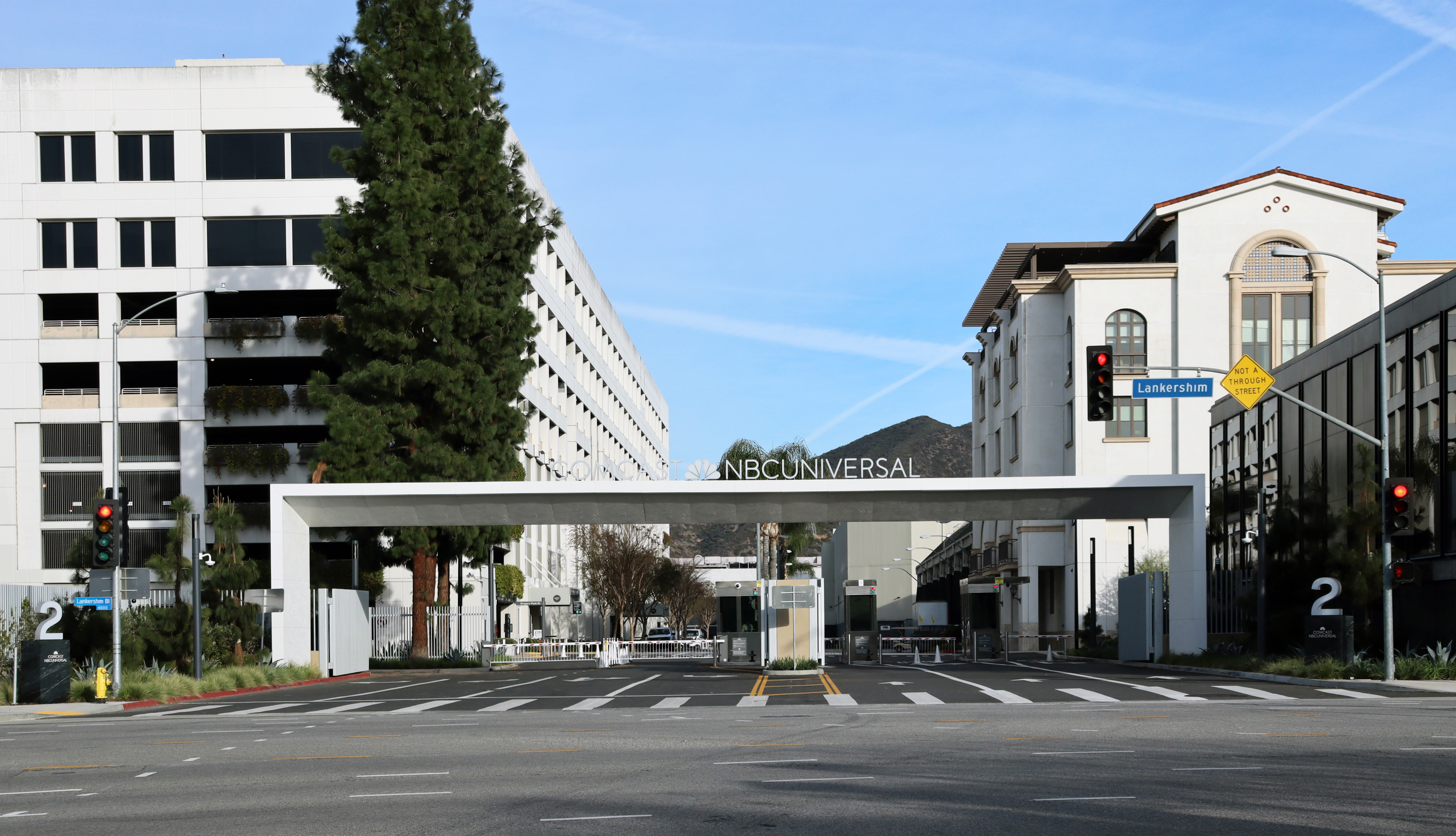
Gate 2, Universal Studios

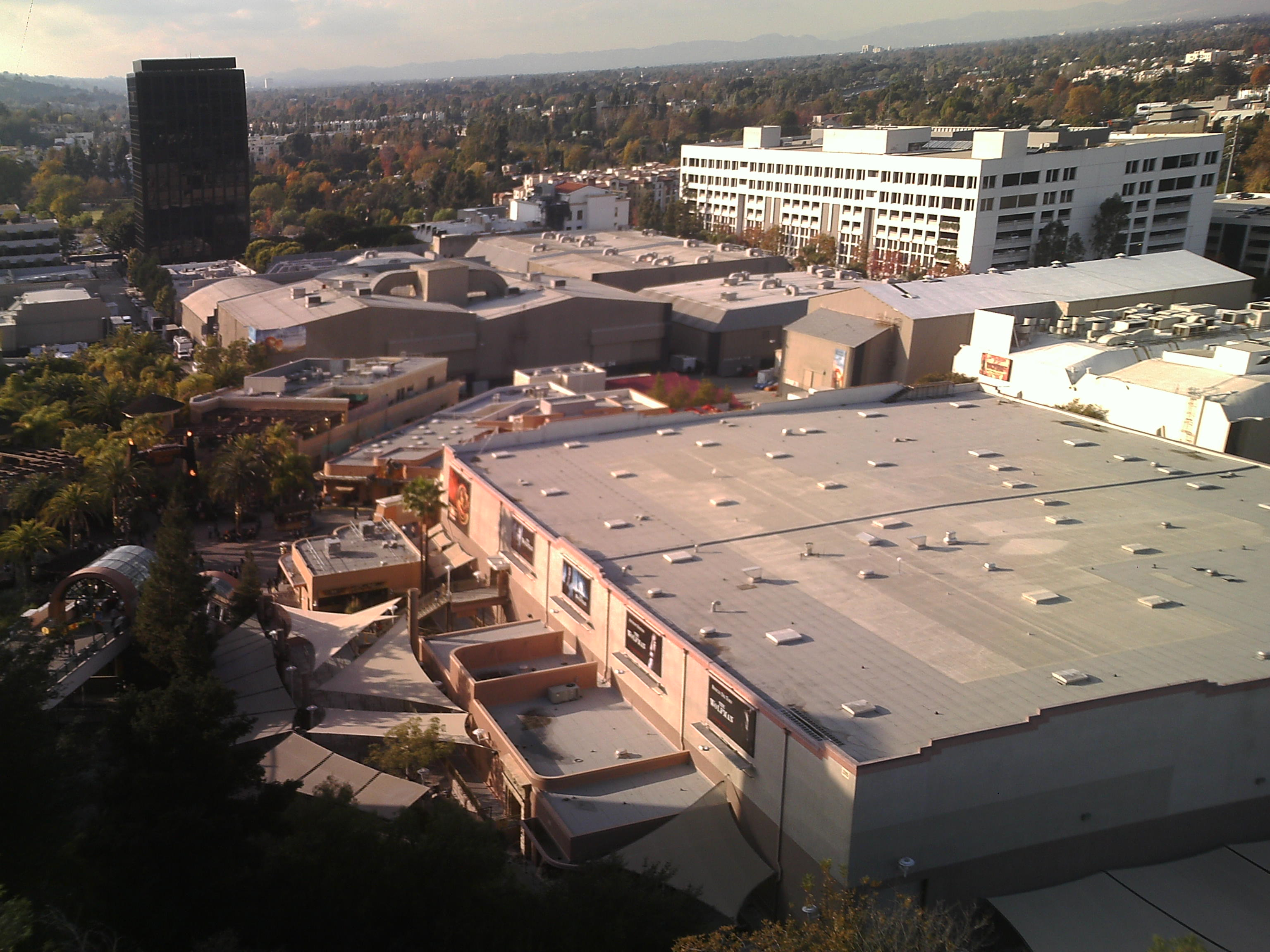
Aerial view of soundstages

== Studio Tour ==
The Studio Tour (also known as The Backlot Tour) is a ride attraction at the Universal Studios Hollywood theme park in Universal City, California, near Los Angeles. Opened on July 15, 1964, Studio Tour is the theme park's signature attraction. Guests sit on multi-car trams for the duration of the ride and looking behind the scenes of Universal Pictures. There is also a VIP version of the Studio Tour.

== See also ==
- The Studios at Paramount
- Warner Bros. Studios Burbank
- Walt Disney Studios (Burbank)
- Sony Pictures Studios
