= Florence Eldridge =

American actress (1901–1988)

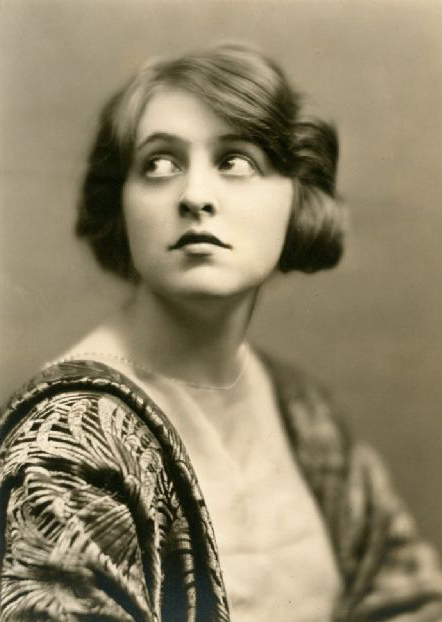
- Florence Eldridge in 1922
- Born: Florence McKechnie; September 5, 1901; New York City, U.S.
- Died: August 1, 1988 (aged 86); Long Beach, California, U.S.
- Occupation: Actress
- Years active: 1918–1978
- Spouse(s): Howard Rumsey (m. 1921; div. 192?) Fredric March (m. 1927; died 1975)
- Children: 2

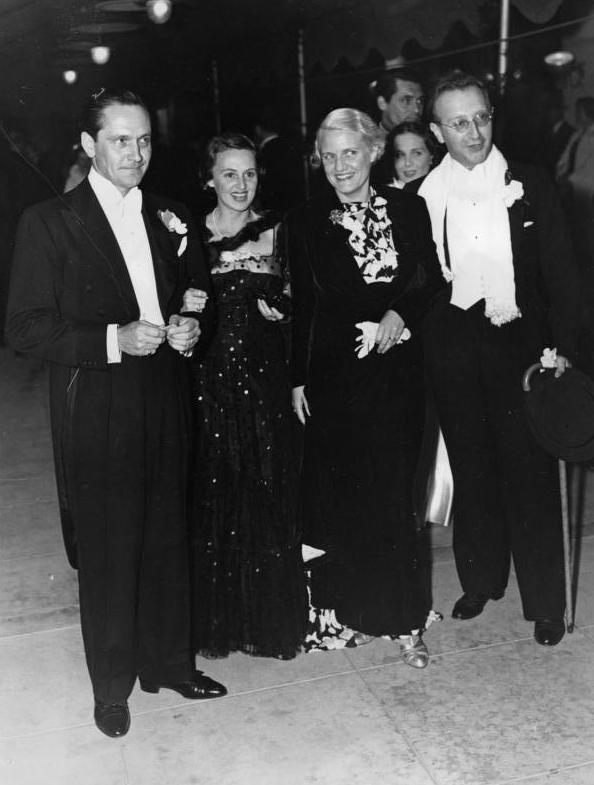
Left to right: Fredric March with his wife Florence Eldridge, Helga Maria zu Löwenstein-Wertheim-Freudenberg (born Schuylenburg) with husband Hubertus Prinz zu Löwenstein-Wertheim-Freudenberg at the Premiere of Anthony Adverse on 29 July 1936 in Los Angeles.

Florence Eldridge (born Florence McKechnie, September 5, 1901 – August 1, 1988) was an American actress. She was nominated for the Tony Award for Best Actress in a Play in 1957 for her performance in Long Day's Journey into Night.

== Early years ==
Eldridge was born Florence McKechnie in Brooklyn, New York, the daughter of Charles J. McKechnie. She attended public schools, including P.S. 85 and Girls' High School.

== Stage ==
Eldridge made her Broadway debut at age 17 as a chorus member of Rock-a-Bye Baby at the Astor Theatre. The reference book American Theatre: A Chronicle of Comedy and Drama, 1930–1969 noted, "In the 1920s she won major attention in such plays as The Cat and the Canary and Six Characters in Search of an Author."

In 1965, she and her husband Fredric March did a world tour under the auspices of the U.S. State Department. Eldridge wrote that they were "experimenting to see if an acting couple doing excerpts from plays on a bare stage could reach and appeal to a worldwide audience."

== Personal life ==
On March 19, 1921, Eldridge married Howard Rumsey, who owned the Empire Theater and the Knickerbocker Players (both in Syracuse) and the Manhattan Players of Rochester. They were wed at her aunt's home in Maplewood, New Jersey.

In 1926, Eldridge was the leading lady in the summer stock cast at Elitch Theatre, and the leading man was Fredric March. They fell in love and were married in 1927. They remained married until his death in 1975, and she appeared alongside him on stage and in seven films. They adopted two children, Penelope and Anthony. Like her husband, she was a liberal Democrat.

== Partial credits ==
=== Stage ===
- The Cat and the Canary
- Six Characters in Search of an Author
- An Enemy of the People
- Long Day's Journey Into Night
- The Skin of Our Teeth
- The Autumn Garden

=== Screen ===
- Six Cylinder Love (1923) as Marilyn Sterling
- The Studio Murder Mystery (1929) as Blanche Hardell
- The Greene Murder Case (1929) as Sibella Greene
- Charming Sinners (1929) as Helen Carr
- The Divorcee (1930) as Helen
- The Matrimonial Bed (1930) as Juliet Corton
- Thirteen Women (1932) as Grace Coombs
- The Great Jasper (1933) as Jenny Horn
- Dangerously Yours (1933) as Jo Horton
- The Story of Temple Drake (1933) as Ruby Lemarr
- A Modern Hero (1934) as Leah Ernst
- Les Misérables (1935) as Fantine
- Mary of Scotland (1936) as Elizabeth Tudor
- Another Part of the Forest (1948) as Lavinia Hubbard
- An Act of Murder (1948) as Catherine Cooke
- Christopher Columbus (1949) as Queen Isabella
- Inherit the Wind (1960) as Sarah Brady

== Radio appearances ==
Year	Program	Episode/source
1953	Star Playhouse	There Shall Be No Night
