= Courthouse Square =

Backlot in Universal City, California, US

Coordinates: 34.141395°N 118.34978°W

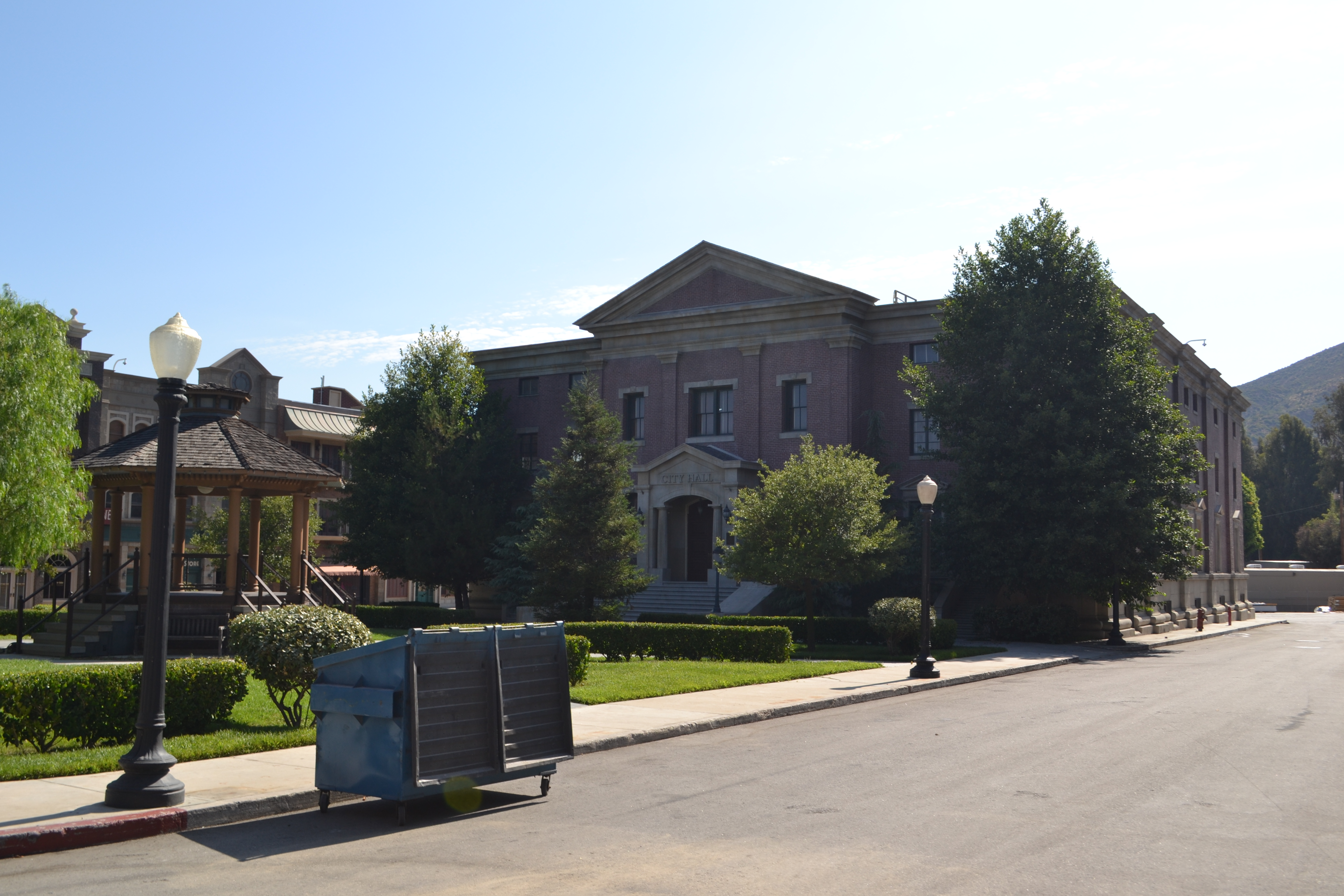
Courthouse Square in 2011

Courthouse Square is a backlot located at the Universal Studios Lot in Universal City, California. The set is composed of several facades that form an archetypal American town square with a courthouse as its centerpiece. The set was built for the 1948 film An Act of Murder and was featured as downtown Hill Valley in the Back to the Future trilogy, as well as Kingston Falls in the Gremlins series.

Prior to the Back to the Future series, the area was known as Mockingbird Square owing to its role in the film To Kill a Mockingbird. It has been severely damaged by fire several times, including in 1957, 1990 and 2008. It was reconstructed after each incident.

== Fires ==
A three-alarm fire broke out at the Universal back lot in the early morning hours on June 1, 2008. It was reported that Courthouse Square was destroyed, though the Courthouse facade and town facade to the north are still standing. The King Kong attraction and New York Street were destroyed. The set had previously been damaged by fire in 1990.

== Productions ==
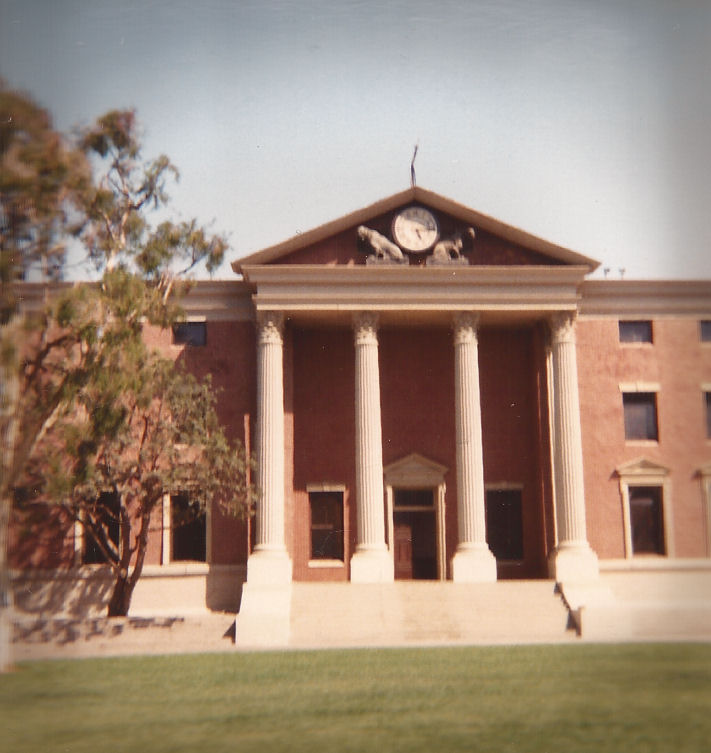
Courthouse Square set in 1991, two years after the filming of Back to the Future Part II

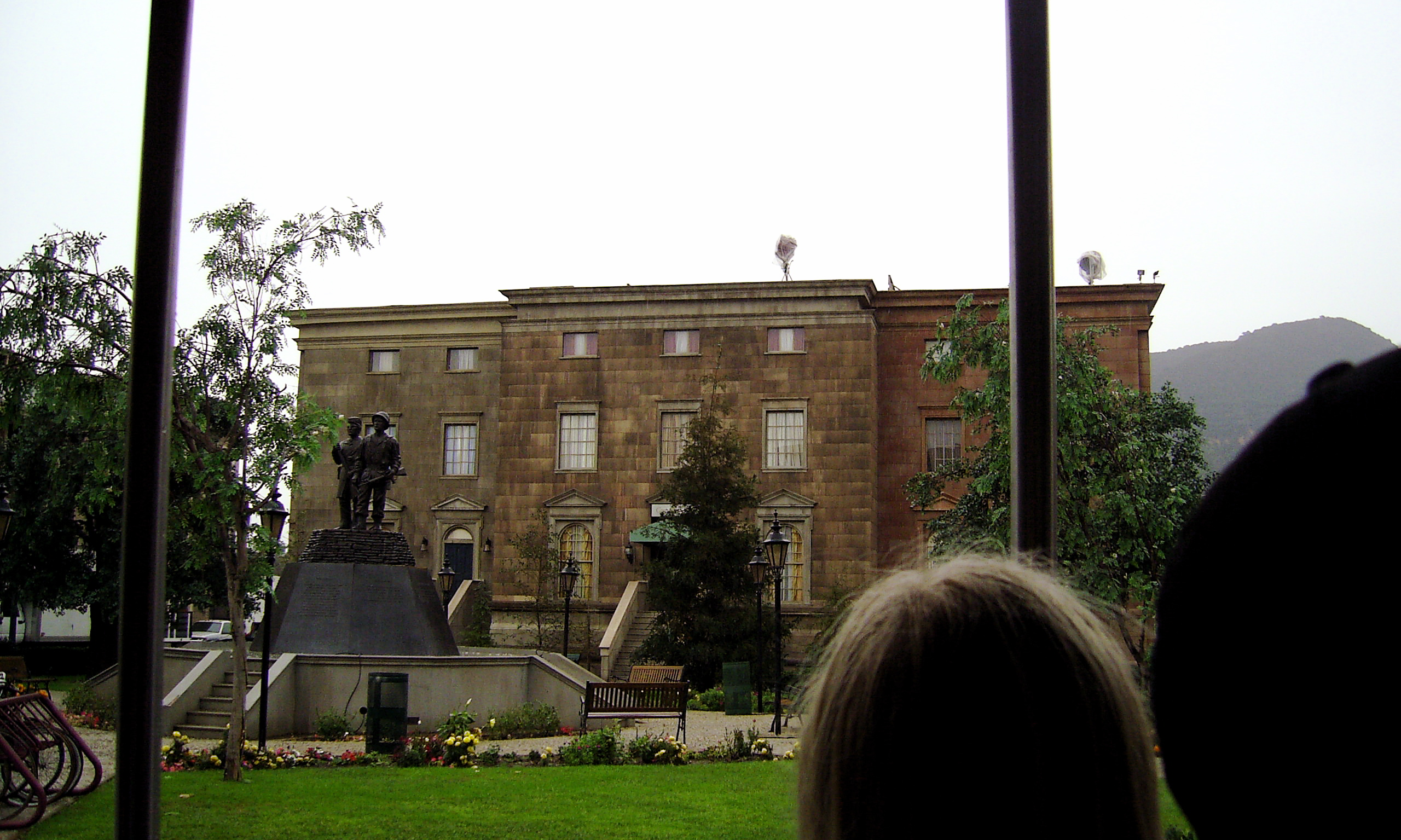
The square redressed for Ghost Whisperer with the pediment portion of the courthouse covered with a different façade

Following is a partial list of productions that used the Courthouse Square set:

- An Act of Murder (1948)
- Ma and Pa Kettle (1949–1954)
- Abbott and Costello Go to Mars (1953)
- It Came from Outer Space (1953)
- Tarantula (1955)
- The Monolith Monsters (1957)
- Rock-A-Bye Baby (1958)
- Leave It to Beaver (1957–1963)
- The Twilight Zone: "Where Is Everybody?" (1959; first episode)
- Inherit the Wind (1960)
- To Kill a Mockingbird (1962)
- Bye Bye Birdie (1963)
- Village of the Giants (1965)
- The Reluctant Astronaut (1967)
- How to Frame a Figg (1971)
- The Alpha Caper (1973)
- The Incredible Hulk (1977–1982)
- The Misadventures of Sheriff Lobo (1978)
- Psycho II (1983)
- Simon & Simon (1981–1988)
- Knight Rider (1982–1986)
- Street Hawk: "Vegas Run" (1984)
- The New Leave It to Beaver (1984–1988)
- Gremlins (1984)
- Back to the Future (1985)
- Magnum, P.I. (1986)
- Back to the Future Part II (1989)
- Sneakers (1992)
- Weird Science (1994–1998)
- Dr. Quinn, Medicine Woman (1994)
- The Nutty Professor (1996)
- Jingle All the Way (1996)
- Escape from L.A. (1996)
- Batman & Robin (1997)
- Amistad (1997)
- That Darn Cat (1997)
- Buffy the Vampire Slayer (1998)
- Sliders (1999)
- The Offspring: "Why Don't You Get a Job?" (1999)
- Bruce Almighty (2003)
- The Cat in the Hat (2003)
- Ghost Whisperer (2005–2010)
- Falling Skies (2011–2015)
- The Campaign (2012)
- House M.D.,"The Confession" (2011)
- Hairspray Live! (2016)
- Goosebumps 2: Haunted Halloween (2018)
- A.P. Bio (2020)
- Rutherford Falls (2021-2022)
- Ted (2024)
- MaXXXine (2024)

== See also ==
- RKO Forty Acres
- Colonial Street

== External links and references ==
- HILL VALLEY – COURTHOUSE SQUARE 1955–2015
- The Studio Tour entry on "Courthouse Square"
