= List of Ghost Whisperer episodes =

The following is an episode list for the CBS drama, Ghost Whisperer. The show's title is a reference to the main character, Melinda Gordon (portrayed by Jennifer Love Hewitt), who has the ability to see and communicate with the dead.

As of 2011, all seasons are available on DVD. During the course of the series, 107 episodes of Ghost Whisperer aired over five seasons, between September 23, 2005, and May 21, 2010.

hetshow

== Overview ==
| Season | Episodes | Originally released | |
| Season | Episodes | First released | Last released |
|---|---|---|---|
| 1 | 22 | September 23, 2005 | May 5, 2006 |
| 2 | 22 | September 22, 2006 | May 11, 2007 |
| 3 | 18 | September 28, 2007 | May 16, 2008 |
| 4 | 23 | October 3, 2008 | May 15, 2009 |
| 5 | 22 | September 25, 2009 | May 21, 2010 |

== Episodes ==
=== Season 1 (2005–06) ===
| No. overall | No. in season | Title | Directed by | Written by | Original release date | U.S. viewers (millions) |
|---|---|---|---|---|---|---|
| 1 | 1 | "Pilot" | John Gray | John Gray | September 23, 2005 | 11.25 |
| 2 | 2 | "The Crossing" | Ron Lagomarsino | Catherine Butterfield | September 30, 2005 | 10.87 |
| 3 | 3 | "Ghost, Interrupted" | Ian Sander | Jed Seidel | October 7, 2005 | 11.07 |
| 4 | 4 | "Mended Hearts" | John Gray | John Gray | October 14, 2005 | 9.99 |
| 5 | 5 | "Lost Boys" | Peter O'Fallon | David Fallon | October 21, 2005 | 10.55 |
| 6 | 6 | "Homecoming" | James Frawley | Lois Johnson | October 28, 2005 | 11.73 |
| 7 | 7 | "Hope and Mercy" | Bill L. Norton | John Wirth | November 4, 2005 | 12.78 |
| 8 | 8 | "On the Wings of a Dove" | Peter O'Fallon | Catherine Butterfield | November 11, 2005 | 11.41 |
| 9 | 9 | "Voices" | Kevin Hooks | John Belluso | November 18, 2005 | 12.05 |
| 10 | 10 | "Ghost Bride" | Joanna Kerns | Jed Seidel | November 25, 2005 | 12.25 |
| 11 | 11 | "Shadow Boxer" | Joanna Kerns | Emily Fox | December 9, 2005 | 11.19 |
| 12 | 12 | "Undead Comic" | Eric Laneuville | Doug Prochilo | December 16, 2005 | 10.89 |
| 13 | 13 | "Friendly Neighborhood Ghost" | David Jones | Lois Johnson | January 6, 2006 | 11.31 |
| 14 | 14 | "Last Execution" | James Frawley | David Fallon | January 13, 2006 | 10.92 |
| 15 | 15 | "Melinda's First Ghost" | Peter Werner | Catherine Butterfield | January 27, 2006 | 11.62 |
| 16 | 16 | "Dead Man's Ridge" | James Frawley | John Gray | February 3, 2006 | 10.62 |
| 17 | 17 | "Demon Child" | Eric Laneuville | Jed Seidel | March 3, 2006 | 12.40 |
| 18 | 18 | "Miss Fortune" | James Chressanthis | Emily Fox | March 10, 2006 | 10.34 |
| 19 | 19 | "Fury" | Peter Werner | Rama Stagner | March 31, 2006 | 10.22 |
| 20 | 20 | "The Vanishing" | Ian Sander | Catherine Butterfield | April 7, 2006 | 10.05 |
| 21 | 21 | "Free Fall" (Part 1) | John Gray | John Gray | April 28, 2006 | 10.00 |
| 22 | 22 | "The One" (Part 2) | John Gray | John Gray | May 5, 2006 | 11.06 |

=== Season 2 (2006–07) ===
| No. overall | No. in season | Title | Directed by | Written by | Original release date | U.S. viewers (millions) |
|---|---|---|---|---|---|---|
| 23 | 1 | "Love Never Dies" | John Gray | John Gray | September 22, 2006 | 10.33 |
| 24 | 2 | "Love Still Won't Die" | John Gray | John Gray | September 29, 2006 | 9.73 |
| 25 | 3 | "Drowned Lives" | Ian Sander | Jed Seidel | October 6, 2006 | 9.77 |
| 26 | 4 | "The Ghost Within" | Frederick E.O. Toye | Lois Johnson | October 13, 2006 | 10.18 |
| 27 | 5 | "A Grave Matter" | Eric Laneuville | Catherine Butterfield | October 20, 2006 | 10.27 |
| 28 | 6 | "The Woman of His Dreams" | John F. Showalter | Catherine Butterfield | October 27, 2006 | 10.88 |
| 29 | 7 | "A Vicious Cycle" | Eric Laneuville | Jeannine Renshaw | November 3, 2006 | 11.12 |
| 30 | 8 | "The Night We Met" | Peter O'Fallon | David Fallon | November 10, 2006 | 11.46 |
| 31 | 9 | "The Curse of the Ninth" | Peter Werner | Breen Frazier | November 17, 2006 | 10.13 |
| 32 | 10 | "Giving Up the Ghost" | Peter O'Fallon | Jim Kouf | November 24, 2006 | 10.57 |
| 33 | 11 | "Cat's Claw" | Victoria Hochberg | Jim Kouf | December 15, 2006 | 9.66 |
| 34 | 12 | "Dead to Rights (aka. Dead Reckoning)" | Peter Werner | Wendy Mericle | January 5, 2007 | 11.18 |
| 35 | 13 | "Déjà Boo" | Gloria Muzio | Lois Johnson | January 12, 2007 | 10.44 |
| 36 | 14 | "Speed Demon" | James Frawley | Alan Di Fiore | February 2, 2007 | 10.66 |
| 37 | 15 | "Mean Ghost" | Ian Sander | Jeannine Renshaw | February 9, 2007 | 11.16 |
| 38 | 16 | "The Cradle Will Rock" | James Chressanthis | Jed Seidel | February 16, 2007 | 11.35 |
| 39 | 17 | "The Walk-In" | Eric Laneuville | Breen Frazier | February 23, 2007 | 9.54 |
| 40 | 18 | "Children of Ghosts" | Frederick E.O. Toye | Teddy Tenenbaum | March 30, 2007 | 9.36 |
| 41 | 19 | "Delia's First Ghost" | Kim Moses | Jeannine Renshaw | April 6, 2007 | 9.66 |
| 42 | 20 | "The Collector" (Part 1) | Ian Sander | Story by : Melissa Jo Peltier; Teleplay by : Jim Kouf | April 27, 2007 | 9.20 |
| 43 | 21 | "The Prophet" (Part 2) | John Gray | John Gray | May 4, 2007 | 9.25 |
| 44 | 22 | "The Gathering" (Part 3) | John Gray | John Gray | May 11, 2007 | 9.15 |

=== Season 3 (2007–08) ===
| No. overall | No. in season | Title | Directed by | Written by | Original release date | U.S. viewers (millions) |
|---|---|---|---|---|---|---|
| 45 | 1 | "The Underneath" | John Gray | John Gray | September 28, 2007 | 8.72 |
| 46 | 2 | "Don't Try This at Home" | Ian Sander | Teddy Tenenbaum & Laurie McCarthy | October 5, 2007 | 8.91 |
| 47 | 3 | "Haunted Hero" | Eric Laneuville | Breen Frazier & Karl Schaefer | October 12, 2007 | 8.90 |
| 48 | 4 | "No Safe Place" | Peter O'Fallon | Jeannine Renshaw | October 19, 2007 | 8.95 |
| 49 | 5 | "Weight of What Was" | Gloria Muzio | P.K. Simonds | October 26, 2007 | 9.99 |
| 50 | 6 | "Double Exposure" | Eric Laneuville | Laurie McCarthy | November 2, 2007 | 9.18 |
| 51 | 7 | "Unhappy Medium" | Frederick E.O. Toye | Breen Frazier | November 9, 2007 | 9.85 |
| 52 | 8 | "Bad Blood" | Peter Werner | Teddy Tenenbaum | November 16, 2007 | 9.56 |
| 53 | 9 | "All Ghosts Lead to Grandview" | Frederick E.O. Toye | P.K. Simonds & Laurie McCarthy | November 23, 2007 | 9.98 |
| 54 | 10 | "Holiday Spirit" | Steven Robman | Jeannine Renshaw | December 14, 2007 | 9.80 |
| 55 | 11 | "Slam (a.k.a. Slambook)" | Mark Rosman | Karl Schaefer & Daniel Sinclair | January 11, 2008 | 9.86 |
| 56 | 12 | "First Do No Harm" | Ian Sander | John Gray | January 18, 2008 | 9.91 |
| 57 | 13 | "Home But Not Alone" | Eric Laneuville | P.K. Simonds & Laurie McCarthy | April 4, 2008 | 9.06 |
| 58 | 14 | "The Grave Sitter" | Frederick E.O. Toye | John Gray | April 11, 2008 | 8.55 |
| 59 | 15 | "Horror Show" | Ian Sander | Jeannine Renshaw | April 25, 2008 | 8.98 |
| 60 | 16 | "Deadbeat Dads" | Gloria Muzio | Mark B. Perry | May 2, 2008 | 9.21 |
| 61 | 17 | "Stranglehold" (Part 1) | Eric Laneuville | P.K. Simonds & Laurie McCarthy | May 9, 2008 | 8.78 |
| 62 | 18 | "Pater Familias" (Part 2) | John Gray | John Gray | May 16, 2008 | 8.44 |

=== Season 4 (2008–09) ===
| No. overall | No. in season | Title | Directed by | Written by | Original release date | U.S. viewers (millions) |
|---|---|---|---|---|---|---|
| 63 | 1 | "Firestarter" | Eric Laneuville | P.K. Simonds | October 3, 2008 | 9.44 |
| 64 | 2 | "Big Chills" | Peter Werner | Laurie McCarthy | October 10, 2008 | 9.69 |
| 65 | 3 | "Ghost in the Machine" | Steven Robman | Jeannine Renshaw | October 17, 2008 | 8.97 |
| 66 | 4 | "Save Our Souls" | Gloria Muzio | Mark B. Perry | October 24, 2008 | 10.14 |
| 67 | 5 | "Bloodline" | Ian Sander | Melissa Blake & Joy Blake | October 31, 2008 | 9.40 |
| 68 | 6 | "Imaginary Friends and Enemies" | Eric Laneuville | Vivian Lee & Ann Shrake | November 7, 2008 | 11.06 |
| 69 | 7 | "Threshold" | John Gray | John Gray | November 14, 2008 | 11.57 |
| 70 | 8 | "Heart & Soul" | Ian Sander | Mark B. Perry & P.K. Simonds | November 21, 2008 | 11.28 |
| 71 | 9 | "Pieces of You" | Jim Chressanthis | Laurie McCarthy | December 5, 2008 | 9.71 |
| 72 | 10 | "Ball & Chain" | Eric Laneuville | Christina M. Kim & Jeannine Renshaw | December 19, 2008 | 10.18 |
| 73 | 11 | "Life on the Line" | Eric Laneuville | Christina M. Kim & Jeannine Renshaw | January 9, 2009 | 10.64 |
| 74 | 12 | "This Joint's Haunted" | Mark Rosman | Mark B. Perry | January 16, 2009 | 10.58 |
| 75 | 13 | "Body of Water" | Jennifer Love Hewitt | P.K. Simonds & Laurie McCarthy | January 23, 2009 | 11.18 |
| 76 | 14 | "Slow Burn" | Steven Robman | Jeannine Renshaw | February 6, 2009 | 11.41 |
| 77 | 15 | "Greek Tragedy" | Karen Gaviola | Christina M. Kim | February 13, 2009 | 10.30 |
| 78 | 16 | "Ghost Busted" | John Behring | Mark B. Perry & P.K. Simonds | February 27, 2009 | 11.54 |
| 79 | 17 | "Delusions of Grandview" | Jefery Levy | Laurie McCarthy & Mark B. Perry | March 6, 2009 | 11.09 |
| 80 | 18 | "Leap of Faith" | Ian Sander | P.K. Simonds & Laurie McCarthy | March 13, 2009 | 10.58 |
| 81 | 19 | "Thrilled to Death" | Gloria Muzio | Laurie McCarthy & Jeannine Renshaw | April 10, 2009 | 10.08 |
| 82 | 20 | "Stage Fright" | Eric Laneuville | Mark B. Perry | April 24, 2009 | 9.23 |
| 83 | 21 | "Cursed" | Kim Moses | Laurie McCarthy | May 1, 2009 | 9.79 |
| 84 | 22 | "Endless Love" | Ian Sander | P.K. Simonds | May 8, 2009 | 9.50 |
| 85 | 23 | "The Book of Changes" | John Gray | John Gray | May 15, 2009 | 9.15 |

=== Season 5 (2009–10) ===
| No. overall | No. in season | Title | Directed by | Written by | Original release date | U.S. viewers (millions) |
|---|---|---|---|---|---|---|
| 86 | 1 | "Birthday Presence" | Jennifer Love Hewitt | P.K. Simonds & Laurie McCarthy | September 25, 2009 | 8.76 |
| 87 | 2 | "See No Evil" | Eric Laneuville | Jeannine Renshaw | October 2, 2009 | 7.62 |
| 88 | 3 | "Till Death Do Us Start" | Gloria Muzio | Mark B. Perry | October 9, 2009 | 8.78 |
| 89 | 4 | "Do Over" | John Gray | John Gray | October 16, 2009 | 8.05 |
| 90 | 5 | "Cause for Alarm" | Ian Sander | Melissa Blake & Joy Blake | October 23, 2009 | 8.59 |
| 91 | 6 | "Head Over Heels" | Steven Robman | Laurie McCarthy & Stephanie SenGupta | October 30, 2009 | 8.29 |
| 92 | 7 | "Devil's Bargain" | James Chressanthis | Mark B. Perry & P.K. Simonds | November 6, 2009 | 7.99 |
| 93 | 8 | "Dead Listing" | Peter Werner | Laurie McCarthy & Mark B. Perry | November 13, 2009 | 8.06 |
| 94 | 9 | "Lost in the Shadows" | Kim Moses | P.K. Simonds & Laurie McCarthy | November 20, 2009 | 8.42 |
| 95 | 10 | "Excessive Forces" | Kenny Leon | Stephanie SenGupta | December 4, 2009 | 8.18 |
| 96 | 11 | "Dead Air" | Gloria Muzio | Laurie McCarthy & Mark B. Perry | January 8, 2010 | 9.00 |
| 97 | 12 | "Blessings in Disguise" | Jan Eliasberg | Jeannine Renshaw & Ben Chaney | January 15, 2010 | 8.61 |
| 98 | 13 | "Living Nightmare" | Ian Sander | P.K. Simonds | January 29, 2010 | 8.61 |
| 99 | 14 | "Dead to Me" | Ralph Hemecker | Pam Norris | February 5, 2010 | 8.73 |
| 100 | 15 | "Implosion" | Jennifer Love Hewitt | John Gray | March 5, 2010 | 7.35 |
| 101 | 16 | "Old Sins Cast Long Shadows" | Jefery Levy | Mark B. Perry | March 12, 2010 | 7.22 |
| 102 | 17 | "On Thin Ice" | Ian Sander | Melissa Blake & Joy Blake | April 2, 2010 | 5.96 |
| 103 | 18 | "Dead Eye" | John Behring | P.K. Simonds & Laurie McCarthy | April 9, 2010 | 6.55 |
| 104 | 19 | "Lethal Combination" | Kim Moses | Stephanie SenGupta & Steve Gottfried | April 30, 2010 | 6.57 |
| 105 | 20 | "Blood Money" | Eric Laneuville | P.K. Simonds & Laurie McCarthy | May 7, 2010 | 6.46 |
| 106 | 21 | "Dead Ringer" | Ian Sander | Mark B. Perry & Stephanie SenGupta | May 14, 2010 | 6.48 |
| 107 | 22 | "The Children's Parade" | John Gray | John Gray | May 21, 2010 | 6.83 |

== Webisodes ==
=== The Other Side (2007) ===
| No. overall | No. in season | Title | Written by | Original release date |
|---|---|---|---|---|
| 1 | 1 | "Webisode 1" | Unknown | March 30, 2007 |
| 2 | 2 | "Webisode 2" | Kim Moses | April 6, 2007 |
| 3 | 3 | "Webisode 3" | Kim Moses | April 13, 2007 |
| 4 | 4 | "Webisode 4" | Kim Moses | April 20, 2007 |
| 5 | 5 | "Webisode 5" | Kim Moses | April 27, 2007 |
| 6 | 6 | "Webisode 6" | Kim Moses | May 4, 2007 |
| 7 | 7 | "Webisode 7" | Kim Moses | May 11, 2007 |
| 8 | 8 | "Webisode 8" | Kim Moses | May 18, 2007 |

=== The Other Side III (2009) ===
| No. overall | No. in season | Title | Written by | Original release date |
|---|---|---|---|---|
| 17 | 1 | "The Haunting" | Kim Moses | March 13, 2009 |
| 18 | 2 | "Is Your House Haunted?" | Kim Moses | March 20, 2009 |
| 19 | 3 | "Fright Night" | Kim Moses | March 27, 2009 |
| 20 | 4 | "Ghost Rider" | Kim Moses | April 3, 2009 |
| 21 | 5 | "Beyond the Grave" | Kim Moses | April 10, 2009 |
| 22 | 6 | "Romancing the Ghost" | Kim Moses | April 17, 2009 |
| 23 | 7 | "Spirit Awakening" | Kim Moses | April 23, 2009 |
| 24 | 8 | "Death Do Us Part" | Kim Moses | May 1, 2009 |

=== The Other Side IV (2010) ===
| No. overall | No. in season | Title | Written by | Original release date |
|---|---|---|---|---|
| 25 | 1 | "Episode 1" | Kim Moses | April 9, 2010 |
| 26 | 2 | "Episode 2" | Kim Moses | April 16, 2010 |
| 27 | 3 | "Episode 3" | Kim Moses | April 16, 2010 |
| 28 | 4 | "Episode 4" | Kim Moses | April 23, 2010 |
| 29 | 5 | "Episode 5" | Kim Moses | April 30, 2010 |
| 30 | 6 | "Episode 6" | Kim Moses | May 7, 2010 |
| 31 | 7 | "Episode 7" | Kim Moses | May 14, 2010 |
| 32 | 8 | "Episode 8" | Kim Moses | May 21, 2010 |
| 33 | 9 | "Episode 9" | Kim Moses | May 28, 2010 |
