= List of Profiler episodes =

The following is a list of episodes for the television show Profiler.

== Series overview ==
Season	Episodes	Originally released	
Season	Episodes	First released	Last released
1	22	September 21, 1996	May 10, 1997
2	20	November 1, 1997	May 9, 1998
3	21	October 17, 1998	June 5, 1999
4	20	September 25, 1999	July 1, 2000

== Episodes ==
=== Season 1 (1996–97) ===
No. overall	No. in season	Title	Directed by	Written by	Original release date	US viewers (millions)
1	1	"Insight"	John Patterson	Cynthia Saunders	September 21, 1996	13.53
Dr. Samantha "Sam" Waters is a forensic psychologist with a unique gift for understanding the criminal mind by visualizing a crime through the eyes of both the victim and the killer. "Jack", an admiring serial slayer, murdered her husband three years ago, leaving her devastated. Guilt-ridden, Sam retired and retreated with her young daughter, Chloe, to live an anonymous life at a friend's house in the country. She is coaxed out of self-imposed isolation by her old friend Bailey Malone, head of the FBI Investigative Support Unit, to assist in solving a baffling spate of weekend serial killings that have claimed the lives of several single women in Atlanta, Georgia.
2	2	"Ring of Fire"	Peter O'Fallon	Nancy Miller	September 28, 1996	10.54
Sam Waters joins the newly formed Violent Crimes Task Force (VCTF), based in Atlanta and led by her mentor, Bailey Malone. The VCTF includes police detectives John Grant and Nathan Brubaker, forensic specialist Grace Alvarez, and computer hacker George Fraley. While Sam probes a string of well-publicized arson fires in the Deep South, her anonymity is shattered by her murderous, unseen stalker, "Jack-of-All-Trades". As a result, Sam is forced to move with her daughter Chloe and her best friend, Angel, away from their country house, while she uses her skills to compose a profile of the self-destructive arsonist before he strikes again.
3	3	"Unholy Alliance"	P.J. Pesce	Ken Solarz	October 19, 1996	9.70
Sam investigates a series of murders which bear striking similarities to the methods of a killer whom Bailey put in prison 10 years earlier. Sam suspects that the real culprit is still free, and through her insight, she finds clues in the ancient I Ching art of divination that lead her to a high-ranking military officer who may be protecting the killer.
4	4	"I'll Be Watching You"	John Harrison	Lawrence Hertzog	October 26, 1996	9.81
Sam, Bailey and John must find a twisted assassin before he kills a celebrated political candidate. The clues lead them to a famous pop singer, named Morrisa (guest star Tuesday Knight), who is also targeted by the stalker. But Sam is distracted by new evidence that could locate her own murderous stalker, "Jack-of-All-Trades". Relying on audio clues from a recording that he leaves, the hopeful FBI agents zero in on a Baltimore church which they believe to be Jack's lair, only to find the place cleaned out and a message from Jack saying he will be coming after Sam.
5	5	"Unsoiled Sovereignty"	Sarah Pia Anderson	Phyllis Murphy & Jean Gennis	November 2, 1996	8.31
A series of bomb blasts at power plants draw Sam, Bailey and the rest of the task force to Pittsburgh, where Sam meets a charming ATF bomb squad dismantler, Nick Cooper, and the flirtatious pair quickly form a romantic bond. Even so, their primary focus remains on targeting a deranged man, with an obsessive fetish for cleanliness, who targets Grace as his liaison between the authorities, while he is working on a masterwork blast to poison the city's water supply.
6	6	"Modus Operandi"	Andy Wolk	Bob Lowry	November 9, 1996	11.08
When the twisted, serial killer, Jack-of-All-Trades, murders a kindly neighborhood fix-it man, Sam discovers a pattern: her unseen tormentor is leaving messages to her through his victims, all of whom had some connection to her. As Sam agonizes over her slain acquaintances, her new beau Cooper and Bailey try to comfort and protect her. But they can't watch her all the time: unlike Jack who sets out to target Cooper.
7	7	"Night Dreams"	Ian Toynton	Cynthia Saunders	November 16, 1996	10.51
Sam, Bailey, Grant and Brubaker race the clock to track a serial kidnapper who curiously abducts a wide range of women from a college student to a senior citizen. Based on his ritualistic clues, Sam deduces that they have only hours before the victims are executed. While in pursuit, agent John Grant is wounded during a shootout with the abductor, and the trail cools off until Sam gets an unlikely break when she finds a stripper who survived an attempted kidnapping. Meanwhile, Sam's daughter, Chloe, continues to have recurring nightmares about being accosted by a mysterious man. Sam discovers that Chloe witnessed "Jack-of-All-Trades" killing Sam's late husband.
8	8	"Cruel and Unusual"	Ian Sander	Sibyl Sander	December 14, 1996	10.13
Sam and the team investigate a series of bizarre killings whose victims were connected to the trial of a charming murderer on death row sentenced to die within days. One of her prime suspects is a love struck protester who leads a candlelight watch outside the prison while appeals are filed to halt the execution. Elsewhere, the unseen serial killer and master of disguises, Jack-of-All-Trades, assembles a roulette wheel with pictures of the entire VCTF unit: and one spin will determine his next victim.
9	9	"The Sorcerer's Apprentice"	Lewis Teague	Ken Solarz	January 4, 1997	9.40
When Native American chiefs are ritually murdered on an Arkansas reservation, Sam, Bailey and Grant tiptoe around local suspicions and superstitions as the locals blame a 1,000-year-old spirit, the Nacazanti, and a perplexed Sam consults a tribal wise man to narrow the list of suspects. Back in Atlanta, "Jack-of-All-Trades" somehow steals Bailey's FBI ID and uses it to entrap and kill a woman, and frame Bailey for the murder.
10	10	"Shattered Silence"	Sarah Pia Anderson	George Geiger	January 11, 1997	9.50
The separate kidnappings of two high-profile doctors and the evidence left behind lead Sam to believe that the prime suspect is a patient with an incurable medical condition who is driven to take desperate measures. Meanwhile, Bailey is riddled with guilt when he develops a mutual attraction with the wife of one of the missing men. Also, Jack-of-All-Trades continues his quest to isolate Sam by targeting Agent Brubaker, dropping his jalopy on him while Brubaker is underneath working on it.
11	11	"Doppelganger"	John Patterson	Bob Lowry	January 18, 1997	10.12
Sam interrogates inmate Arthur de Rhodes, a serial killer whom she put in a prison for the criminally insane six years earlier, over a recent murder of an elderly man from poison gas inhalation that bears striking similarities to his modus operandi. However, when another murder occurs, Sam wonders whether the culprit could possibly be the clever de Rhodes, or a copycat killer. All bets are off when de Rhodes eventually escapes, and no one is safe, especially Sam. Meanwhile, "Jack" begins to target and terrorize Angel to drive her away from Sam.
12	12	"Learning From the Masters"	Kevin Hooks	Jean Gennis & Phyllis Murphy	February 1, 1997	7.89
When a series of murder victims are found arranged in elaborately staged tableaux, Sam, Bailey and the team deduce that the killer is replicating famous artworks with their lifeless forms. Her investigation plunges her into the avant-garde art world until she accidentally strays into the killer's lair, where he takes her hostage and prepares to use her for his latest three-dimensional "masterpiece." Meanwhile, Jack-of-All-Trades has compromised the team's vital computer system by hacking in and planting various viruses to offset Sam even more. Also, Sam tries to spend more quality time with Chloe when work takes her away.
13	13	"The House that Jack Built"	Carl Schenkel	Lawrence Hertzog	February 8, 1997	8.28
"Jack-of-All-Trades", the inventive but frighteningly elusive sociopathic serial killer stalking Sam, continues to toy with members of the VCTF team and their families. Bailey orders everyone (Angel and Chloe, Grace's husband, George's partner, and Brubaker's brother) into the task force's bunker-like command center as they scramble to devise a trap to ensnare Jack. As the technologically brilliant Jack delights in eavesdropping and seeing them almost everywhere, the frustrated team uses Sam and Grant as bait to try to flush Jack out into the open. Unsuccessful twice, they trace a hitman hired by Jack to the evil genius's lair (a children's Catholic orphanage). Jack escapes but is forced to leave his lair and equipment behind.
14	14	"Shadow of Angels: Parts 1 & 2"	John Patterson	Sibyl Gardner	February 15, 1997	9.34
15	15	"Shadow of Angels: Parts 1 & 2"	Kevin Hooks	Charles D. Holland	February 15, 1997	9.34
Sam and the VCTF team investigate a series of bizarre murders where the victims are either crushed or strangled with silver coins. As the killings become more violent, Sam puts the evidence together to conclude that the killers are linked to a recluse millionaire named Charles Vanderhorn (guest star James Coburn) who may know the identity of the killer(s). Meanwhile, Sam and the team get a lead on "Jack" when a man named Austin Keller is identified. He flees by plane to Costa Rica where the VCTF team finally capture Keller whom they suspect is Jack. Upon arrival back in Atlanta, Samantha continues to investigate the Vanderhorn murders as well as seeking solace with Coop over the recent events. Samantha is unsure if Austin Keller really is Jack or just an insane wannabe. She then finds herself as a mediator in a hostage situation when the last surviving killer of the quartet of Vanderhorn killers is holed up in a TV station with Charles Vanderhorn as his hostage.
16	16	"Film at Eleven"	David S. Jackson	Steve Feke	March 8, 1997	9.05
Sam and the task force probe a series of ghastly murders which are carefully videotaped and sent to TV newsrooms by a vigilante who announces that the crimes are righteous retribution against guilty people who slip through the judicial system. When a young Brooklyn woman is kidnapped and thought to be alive, Sam, Bailey and John accelerate the investigation to former law students with strong opinions about crime and punishment. Meanwhile, Grace secretly takes a leave when she realizes that she's pregnant. Jack is revealed to be alive and settled in another lair while continuing to spy on Sam and tapping her phone line.
17	17	"Crisis"	Matt Penn	Bob Lowry	March 22, 1997	8.68
Carl Zaun, a zealous anti-nuclear scientist leading a cadre of steely commandos, captures a banquet room full of Washington D.C. brass, and vows to kill them unless the President agrees to meet their demands to ban nuclear weapons. Sam tries to negotiate when they take her hostage as well. While Bailey, Cooper and John debate what to do, Zaun and a few surviving terrorists escape and are cornered in an airplane hangar, where a desperate Sam tries to "profile" the anguished scientist, hoping to find a common bond that might save both their lives. In the meantime, Bailey learns that his estranged 17-year-old daughter, Frances, has run away from the home of his ex-wife in Baltimore and lands in jail for robbery. A nun from the orphanage where Jack formerly hid out recognizes him one day in a store by the scent of his special aftershave. He stalks and kills her.
18	18	"Blue Highway"	Michael Pattinson	Phyllis Murphy & Jean Gennis	April 5, 1997	10.30
Sam and the VCTF investigate a series of fatal hit-and-run auto accidents on remote highways where the only clues are abandoned car hulks, a pattern which leads Sam to suspect a trucker who is reliving a traumatic accident from his childhood. Meanwhile, George is mugged and nearly killed in a video store holdup. Elsewhere, Bailey feels responsible for not being around when Frances begins cutting school and hanging out with a rough crowd. Also, Angel is very appreciative when John speaks to her art class and a romance develops between them.
19	19	"FTX: Field Training Exercise"	Michael Lange	George Geiger & Charles D. Holland	April 12, 1997	7.52
The task force comes under intense scrutiny when the FBI suspects that an insider is selling covert information. Bailey agrees to a mock field training exercise designed to root out the mole, where he learns that one of the agents, Art Behar, has a personal grudge against him for being involved with Behar's ex-wife, Ellen. When a senior investigator, Ed Portero, is found murdered in the command center, Sam tries to profile which one of the team's edgy members might benefit the most from trading FBI secrets. Meanwhile, Grace goes public with the news that she's pregnant, and Nathan stands at the crossroads of the future of his bumpy marriage with his lawyer wife, Michelle.
20	20	"Into the Abyss"	Dan Lerner	David A. Simons	April 26, 1997	8.56
A burned-out Sam takes somber note of a psychic-turned-author, Elliott Wykoff, whose cooperation with police in solving serial murders has taken a heavy toll on his emotional stability. But worst of all, he is targeted by a serial killer intent on putting him out of his misery. Meanwhile, John chafes under Bailey's strict policy and hard-nosed code of secrecy. When John gets an offer to re-join the Atlanta police, he accepts. Bailey has more problems at home when he attempts to rein in his trouble-prone daughter, Frances.
21	21	"Venom: Parts 1 & 2"	James Whitmore Jr.	Steve Feke	May 10, 1997	8.70
22	22	"Venom: Parts 1 & 2"	Dan Lerner	Bob Lowry	May 10, 1997	8.70
Sam, Bailey, Grace, and Nathan are taunted by a diabolical female serial killer who prefers to use a variety of exotic poisonous animals (tree frogs, spiders, snakes, etc.) to kill her victims, while providing her pursuers with cryptic clues to her next murder. Meanwhile, John, now back working for the Atlanta police, arrests Frances during a drug raid and tries to talk some sense into her. A frustrated Bailey is further irritated by the arrival of a sexy private investigator named Christine Logan, who tries to aid the VCTF. The unit's chief nemesis, serial killer "Jack of All Trades", ironically can help the most when he faxes messages to Sam with clues to the killer's identity. Also, Bailey asks Cooper to replace John on the team while Brubaker decides on a transfer and leaves the VCTF for good. Sam figures out the identity of the so-called "venom killer" as Robin Poole (guest star Lori Petty) when a victim, suffering from sea wasp jellyfish stings, disappears from the hospital (it was Robin impersonating a victim). John and Cooper travel to Arkansas to investigate Robin's origins for her murderous lifestyle. Bailey takes drastic measures to curb his carousing daughter, Frances, by sending her to a reform school, where she shoots him with his own gun. John debates the future of his intimate relationship with Angel and they both agree to split up. After a few taunts, Jack strikes again, first by framing the FBI and VCTF by impersonating an agent and beating up a few suspects, and then abducting both Sam and the "venom killer" Robin Poole. He taunts the VCTF by filming it on an Internet web site.

=== Season 2 (1997–98) ===
No. overall	No. in season	Title	Directed by	Written by	Original release date
23	1	"Ambition in the Blood"	Dan Lerner	George Geiger	November 1, 1997
As Bailey clings to life in an Atlanta hospital following the shooting, Sam and the team are forced to take on a high profile case involving an international serial killer. The murderer, Ashok Dupree, has escaped from a prison in Calcutta, India and comes to the U.S. for the purpose of killing a celebrity, so that he too can become world renowned. While working to bring the killer to justice, Sam must convince herself and the overzealous Atlanta Police Department Captain Lou Handleman that she is innocent of the murder that Jack actually committed. Also, John decides to return to the VCTF, and Bailey's daughter, Frances, now on the run as a fugitive, contacts John to check on her father's condition.
24	2	"Primal Scream"	Ian Sander	Steve Feke	November 8, 1997
The VCTF is called in to investigate the seemingly random murders of four people beaten to death during a rainstorm. Sam and the team consult with a psychologist who informs them of a syndrome where people become extremely violent in response to certain types of weather. The clues lead to a construction worker afflicted with the seasonal disorder. Meanwhile, Sharon Lesher (Traci Lords), a young felon is released from prison and is met by her pen pal, Jack, whom he takes back to his lair and it becomes clear this is the beginning of an "unholy alliance." Also, Bailey laments the fact that the police plan to charge Frances with attempted murder once they determine her whereabouts.
25	3	"It Cuts Both Ways"	Jack Bender	George Geiger	November 15, 1997
The VCTF is summoned to New Orleans when the murder of a research librarian has the markings of a Jack kill. Sam is perplexed by what appears to be inconsistencies with Jack's prior modus operandi. It turns out that Jack-of-All-Trades is wreaking havoc with a new lethal female partner-in-crime, Sharon Lesher (Traci Lords), who becomes "Jill-of-All-Trades". Meanwhile, Bailey meets his new boss, Art Behar, who threatens to shut down the VCTF since he still holds a grudge against Bailey for dating his ex-wife. Also, George is confronted by his past misdeeds when a corrupt attorney asks him to use his computer hacking skills to embezzle funds from a local bank.
26	4	"Second Best"	Félix Enríquez Alcalá	Charles D. Holland	November 22, 1997
When a hospital is the target of a bombing attack, the VCTF is called in to investigate. They are dealing with a highly skilled explosives expert who obviously has an agenda in mind. Bailey summons Cooper to Atlanta to assist with the case. His return is awkward for him and Sam as they have previously ended their romantic relationship. With Frances finally in custody, Bailey must deal with her legal problems as the prosecutor sees her case as a stepping stone for political office and is determined to see her do jail time for shooting her father and fleeing prosecution. Meanwhile, George also faces difficulties as he continues to be pressured by an old acquaintance to embezzle funds from a local bank. This "pressure" becomes threats of violence when the guy's muscle, the mysterious Marcus Peyton (Shiek Mahmud-Bey), turns out to be an undercover policeman. Coop manages to capture the bomber, only to be abducted by Jack and killed by his lethal companion, Jill, who are impersonating ambulance workers.
27	5	"Power Corrupts"	Tucker Gates	Jeremy R. Littman	December 6, 1997
The VCTF team is on the trail of a serial killer in Chicago who seems to be taking aim at people he deems corrupt. Jim Henegar, the Chicago detective investigating the murders, is reluctant to relinquish control of the case, and he becomes a hindrance to Sam and the team. The evidence leads to a judge, MacGruder, whose son was corrupted in one way or another by the three victims. At the same time, Bailey, who is still healing from the shotgun wound inflicted by his daughter, receives an unexpected phone call from Frances, who is still on the run and whom he tries to persuade to return home, to no avail. Also, the still-unseen Jack angrily rips down his wanted sketch posters from post offices and sends the VCTF a package that includes his own artistic self portrait made from the hair and teeth of his past victims. (Note: This episode was the second one produced and filmed of the season, but was broadcast out of sequence. Thus, the episode appears to contain various discrepancies, including Frances still being a fugitive and Jack not having yet met Sharon.)
28	6	"Old Acquaintance"	Jack Bender	Dee Johnson	December 13, 1997
At Christmas time, still recuperating from Coop's death at the hands of the serial killing couple Jack-and-Jill-of-All-Trades, Sam decides to attend a college reunion. There, Sam and Angel reunite with friends Colleen, Drew, Greg, Monica, Tracy, and Roy. An enjoyable holiday gathering quickly becomes a nightmare when Colleen is murdered and all the evidence points to Colleen's husband, Drew, whom Sam never liked. Soon another friend, Roy, is murdered, and then Drew himself. Back in Atlanta, Sharon (a.k.a. Jill-of-All-Trades) strikes out on her own and murders a lingerie shop clerk. The team investigates and starts to make headway. When Sharon learns of Jack's obsession with Sam, she sets out to kill her.
29	7	"Jack Be Nimble, Jack Be Quick"	Jefery Levy	George Geiger & Charles D. Holland	January 3, 1998
Still investigating the reunion killer, Sam determines that one of her friends, Greg or Monica, is the likely killer. With the VCTF hot on his trail, a wounded Jack escapes to his lair to recuperate from being shot. In attempting to pursue Jack, as well as the killer of her friends, Sam begins to wonder if it is all becoming a bit too overwhelming. Meanwhile, Frances attempts to give herself an 18th birthday present by seducing John. The plan fails and John calls Sam to help him take the ever-rebellious teen home to her father. Bailey asks Marcus Peyton to join the VCTF team and he accepts, to John's dismay. The team finally corners Jack at a convalescent home where he has gone to get painkilling drugs for his gunshot wound. But Jack hides in a body bag of one of the deceased residents and makes another clever escape.
30	8	"Victims of Victims"	John Patterson	Elaine Loeser	January 10, 1998
When a North Carolina murder occurs that bears all the markings of an unsolved serial case from 1957, Sam and the VCTF team investigate and discover a fingerprint not previously detected. This enables the team to I.D. the killer, who turns out to have committed suicide prior to the most recent murder. Sam talks to a writer who researched the original case and learns of a young boy who claimed to have witnessed one of the crimes. Meanwhile, Jack (whose real name is finally revealed as Albert Newquay) recuperates from his gunshot wound at the Maryland home of his wealthy but equally deranged mother, Miriam (Louise Fletcher). With Jack gone, Sharon redecorates his lair by eliminating all traces of Sam. Sam's in-laws come to town to see Chloe perform in a school play, but are angered when Sam has to miss as Grace goes into labor with a baby boy while the team investigates a crime scene.
31	9	"Birthright"	Bobby Roth	Natalie Chaidez	January 17, 1998
A killer's belief he was switched at birth leads him to kill those he feels stole his identity. Two men, born at the same time and in the same hospital as the killer, are brutally murdered. Sam and the team are called in once the link between the two victims is established. Evidence leads the team to an insane woman who believes her baby was switched at birth. The woman swears the badly-deformed baby she was given in the hospital was actually the child of someone else. She was never able to prove that charge, and unfortunately for the baby given to her, she was a cruel and abusive parent. Meanwhile, Jack reverts to his old murderous form when he kills his mother's butler after discovering she ordered him to follow her son. Also, Sam is concerned about Chloe when she feigns being sick in order to miss school. The problem is revealed to be that Chloe has to write an essay on her parents' occupation and she's afraid to talk about her mom's secret job.
32	10	"Dying to Live"	Jefery Levy	Bob Lowry	January 31, 1998
Two men are killed, and in both instances, their organs are delivered to hospitals minutes before they are needed for transplant surgery. Sam and the team profile the murders and determine their suspect is someone who was probably an organ recipient in the past. Now, he is returning the favor by providing organs for people with his same rare blood type. Meanwhile, Art Behar, Bailey's boss, sets him up to take a fall in a witness tampering scandal. But John, Marcus and George find evidence that clears Bailey and nails Behar once and for all. Elsewhere, Jack becomes displeased when he learns Sharon has struck up a friendship with the friendly proprietor of a local news stand. Jack kills the man, and angrily asserts to Sharon that "he" is her one and only friend. Chloe is followed by a man revealed to be a private investigator hired by Sam's in-laws.
33	11	"Ties that Bind"	Ian Sander	Kim Moses & Ian Sander	February 7, 1998
Ritualized murders are occurring in Atlanta and in neighboring states. The victims are stabbed and their homes are vandalized with gang-like graffiti. The VCTF is called in and focuses on the son of two of the victims. Further investigation reveals that the son is under the influence of a "Heaven's Gate"-like cult, which Sam goes undercover to infiltrate. Meanwhile, Sam's in-laws resort to legal matters in an attempt to gain permanent guardianship of Chloe and Frances continues to cause discord between John and Bailey by claiming that John seduced her. Jack sends Jill out to kill Sam's in-laws, but she backs out of the hit at the last minute and flees Jack's custody.
34	12	"Shoot to Kill"	Jefery Levy	George Geiger	March 7, 1998
Ohio's cities are being terrorized by a seemingly random sniper. On the scene, Sam, Bailey and the rest of the team are perplexed by the sniper's ability to shoot from increasingly long distances. This ability reminds Bailey of an elite task force he encountered while serving in Vietnam. Bailey obtains from his secret intelligence source Casper, the names of the task force members. Sam uses clues left at the crime scenes to put together a profile that suggests the sniper is trying to create his own mythology, much like the Archer in Greek literature. Meanwhile, the attempt on Sam's former in-laws lead to VCTF learning Jill's true identity, while Jack travels to her hometown of Aurora, Illinois with dubious motives. John and Bailey look into Lou Handleman, who has tried to discredit John by using Frances. But when they attempt to arrest him, Handleman resists and accidentally shoots himself.
35	13	"Bloodlust"	James Whitmore Jr.	Sybil Gardner	March 14, 1998
The dead bodies of badly beaten men are being found in the Boston metropolitan area. Sam and the team quickly surmise these men were involved in some sort of deadly, ultimate, bare-knuckle fighting match. Searching local hospitals, they find a participant in one of the fights. Sam is able to put together from talking to him and researching the backgrounds of the victims, that all were desperate men in need of money. All the men have a bookie in common and the team eventually gets this man to confess his role in the murders. To catch the fight's mastermind in the act, John goes undercover as one of the fighters.
36	14	"Every Five Minutes"	Kim Moses	Steve Feke	March 21, 1998
The VCTF are called in to investigate a serial rapist terrorizing the Florida panhandle. The victims are able to provide the team with a number of clues which Sam uses to form her profile of the assailant. Amid the investigation, Sam butts heads with a local female sheriff who continuously criticizes the VCTF's handling of the case; Sam eventually learns the woman was once a rape victim herself. Back in Atlanta, John and Marcus get a hot tip on Sharon Lesher. Desperate for cash, she has made it known on the street that she is looking for Jimmy Coniglio, one of her old partners in crime who betrayed her in which she was sent to prison four years ago for an armed robbery that Jimmy actually committed. John and Marcus plan to use Jimmy to capture Sharon in a sting operation.
37	15	"Breaking Point"	Ian Toynton	Dee Johnson & Sybil Gardner	March 28, 1998
Bill Porter, a desperate father, kidnaps Sam's roommate Angel, in a last-ditch effort to save his son from the electric chair. Porter's son, Scott, has recently been convicted of murder committed during a robbery. The father believes his son was an innocent bystander and wants Sam and the VCTF to prove it by interrogating the two suspects who were suspected in the robbery. Also, Jack plots to break Sharon out of prison first by tapping into the prison's blueprints to know the building.
38	16	"Lethal Obsession"	Kees van Oostrum	Charles D. Holland	April 4, 1998
Sam and the VCTF investigate the "prime time kidnapper", a madman who has a pathological need for media attention and projects his mania onto an attractive but terrified local TV anchorwoman, Nikki Ware, whom he wants to exclusively cover the prisoner exchanges. Meanwhile, Sam worries about what's really behind her daughter Chloe's reluctance to perform in the children's ballet. Also, the murderous Jack-of-All-Trades makes plans for the release of his imprisoned Jill by killing a prison guard and planning to impersonate him.
39	17	"Cycle of Violence"	Jack Bender	Deidre Strohm & Stacy Codikow	April 11, 1998
A series of vigilante ax murders of abusive husbands leads the VCTF team to an eccentric and reclusive cartoonist, named Evie Long, whose work has apparently influenced the killer. Meanwhile, Sam finally confronts the imprisoned Sharon Lesher (Jill of All Trades) and tries to solicit her help in finding and identifying Jack. But Sharon is very hostile and refuses to cooperate, knowing Jack will eventually try to break her out of the prison, while Sam tries to convince Sharon that Jack intents to kill her to prevent her from talking. Also, Sam becomes nervous when she plans to receive an award from the American Association of Women in Law Enforcement.
40	18	"Die Beautiful"	Ian Toynton	Bob Lowry	May 2, 1998
The VCTF are invited to an ongoing investigation on the murder of a teen beauty who was killed a year ago, and no arrests have been made. Bailey and the team first think the parents of the first victim did it. But they find a killer on death row with matching breaking and entering techniques, but Sam thinks the convict didn't kill his victims. Meanwhile, Bailey's budding romance with Ellen Behar makes Frances more than a little jealous. Sam tries to give more confidence in Chloe, who resents her school friends being better looking than she. Jack of All Trades escalates his harassment of Sam by mailing her a ghoulish board game detailing his next move.
41	19	"The Root of All Evil: Parts 1 & 2"	Ian Sander	Steve Feke & George Geiger	May 9, 1998
42	20	"The Root of All Evil: Parts 1 & 2"	Ian Sander	Steve Feke & George Geiger	May 9, 1998
In the two-part season finale, the team tries to catch a diabolical killer determined to take revenge on people who are so blinded by their love of money that they can't see the repercussions their actions have on the other side of the world, starting with the setting off of incendiary car bombs outside a wealthy business office. The game between Jack and VCTF begins with Sharon as bait to lure Jack to the prison so they can catch him. But Jack has other plans. Meanwhile, Sam pays a visit to her long-estranged father for the first time in a decade. As she struggles to both deal with her father and the elusive avenging killer still committing bombings across the country, she soon makes the final connection to the killer in order to catch him. Also, Bailey goes to extremes for Frances's future when she's accepted into a prestigious college in Boston, but is forbidden to leave Atlanta as a condition of her parole.

=== Season 3 (1998–99) ===
No. overall	No. in season	Title	Directed by	Written by	Original release date
43	1	"Coronation"	Ian Toynton	Stephen Kronish	October 17, 1998
The day after Jack's escape from prison, Sam must look into herself in order to find him. Everything seems to point to her childhood which reveals that Jack has apparently stalked her all his life. Then, Jack abducts an infant and tries to lure Sam into finding him.
44	2	"Cravings"	Jefery Levy	Clifton Campbell	October 24, 1998
The team investigates a serial rapist-turned-murderer in Illinois, whose sporadic timing of the attacks puzzles Sam as well as the connection between his victims who are left in the woods. Sam figures out that the killer is an angry and frustrated married man taking out his rage and frustration on about-to-be-wed women. Meanwhile, with Donald Lucas, the Jack-of-All-Trades killer, finally captured and imprisoned, Sam searches for a new house for her and Chloe.
45	3	"Do the Right Thing"	Ian Toynton	Linda McGibney	October 31, 1998
Sam and the team try to track down a new serial killer who castrates his victims and seems to be driven by feelings of public duty and legal responsibility. Meanwhile, John gets into trouble through no fault of his own for something that appears in the news about the case. Also, Sam finds herself attracted to Paul Sterling, the district attorney assigned to prosecute Donald Lucas.
46	4	"Double Vision"	Lee Bonner	Doris Egan	November 7, 1998
Twelve women of a small Alabama town have mysteriously disappeared. When one of the missing is found dead, the VCTF begins an investigation which leads to the discovery of the remaining 11 women buried in a shallow mass grave. Once on scene, Sam is confounded when evidence points to a domineering, controlling pathology, while other evidence points to a more passive one. When Bailey pressures Sam to narrow her profile, her anxiety builds and she begins to question her own abilities. But it turns out that there are two killers working as a team, each with different profiles. Meanwhile, Sam tries to get a date with Paul Sterling, with less than successful results.
47	5	"The Sum of Her Parts"	Cliff Bole	Jason Cahill	November 14, 1998
Years of verbal and physical abuse take a deadly toll when its victim lashes out against his abuser. Unable to kill the actual perpetrator, his mother, the deranged man strikes those who remind him of the wretched woman. The team investigates and Sam accurately assesses the killer's pathology, but mistakenly assumes the man is acting out against his wife, not his mother. When the ages of the victims begin to rise, Sam realizes her error and theorizes that the killer is slowly working up the courage to murder his tormentor. The team then races to find the ill-fated woman before her son can exact his final revenge. Sam realizes she and Chloe must begin a new life, and to that end, decides to move into a new home.
48	6	"The Monster Within"	Kristoffer Tabori	Jeff Pinkner	November 21, 1998
The VCTF is called in to assist in a stalled investigation which revolves around a series of killings in Allentown, Pennsylvania in which the victims' faces have been burned off. Sam is leery about interceding since her former boyfriend is leading the investigation. Sam and Bailey disagree about his handling of the case when Bailey feels his performance is subpar. Forensic evidence shows that the victims' eyes were the specific target to the killer. Sam uses her intuition and the evidence gathered to theorize the killer did not want to be seen by his victims.
49	7	"Perfect Helen"	James Quinn	Melinda Snodgrass	December 5, 1998
Sam and George travel to his Minnesota hometown to investigate when someone is stealing the corpses of young, recently deceased Jewish women. Though evidence initially points to a local Neo-Nazi group, Sam soon determines that the crimes are motivated by something other than anti-Semitism. This theory takes shape when one of the bodies is found undamaged with minor cosmetic changes made. Sam puts together a profile that characterizes the perpetrator as someone looking to create or re-create his vision of the perfect woman. Eventually, evidence points to a man who is insanely infatuated with a woman who works in his office. When the man kidnaps the object of his affection, Sam fears he will attempt to 'immortalize' his vision of perfect beauty for all eternity.
50	8	"Home for the Homicide"	Jefery Levy	Jennifer Furlong & Sanford Golden	December 12, 1998
The youngest member of an orphaned clan kills to keep his dysfunctional family together. The first murder occurs when the young man kills the boyfriend his sister is considering marrying. Her marriage would result in her leaving the family and that would be unacceptable. Sam profiles that the killer is someone who has felt loss and who is desperately trying to hold on to something he values. The VCTF eventually discover this decidedly unconventional family, and at first, mistakenly believe the physically abusive eldest brother is the killer. Sam soon realizes that there is another, more emotionally immature force at work. Meanwhile, Bailey realizes his ex-wife, Janet, is seriously involved and considering remarriage. Chloe is upset when Sam invites her new boyfriend, Paul, over for Christmas.
51	9	"All in the Family"	Chuck Bowman	Jason Cahill	January 2, 1999
Fueled by the abuse they suffered as children, a brother and sister decide to save another child from the same unfortunate fate. To do this, the warped siblings kill the boy's parents as well as two others to make it look like a mafia hit. The VCTF investigates the mass murder and Sam immediately bonds with the abused boy, Mark. The parents had mob ties, so it is immediately assumed that their murder resulted from their illegal activities. Though skeptical of this scenario, Sam does not dispute it for that would result in Mark being held by the system until the murder is solved. Meanwhile, Sam's estranged father returns and the two try to heal their strained relationship.
52	10	"Ceremony of Innocence"	Vern Gillum	Doris Egan	January 9, 1999
One of Sam's first profiles resulted in a man being sentenced to death. Ten years later when the man is about to be executed, murders begin happening that match the m.o. of the prior killings. Ballistics evidence proves the same gun was used for all the crimes. Sam, feeling culpable for what might have been a deadly mistake, reopens the investigation. Evidence leads to a lowly bicycle courier who is mortally wounded when he resists arrest. Once the dying man is in custody, the death row inmate is released from prison. Though a wrong seems to have been righted, Sam still feels something is amiss.
53	11	"Where or When"	Arthur W. Forney	Linda McGibney	January 16, 1999
A serial killer who kills with his bare hands leaves the bodies of his male victims at the Brown Derby, the Trocadero, and other Hollywood landmarks. Sam profiles the killer as someone trying to rectify some trauma he experienced in his past. The team follows a trail of clues that eventually leads them to a rather ordinary cab driver who does not seem to have the strength necessary to commit the crimes. A search of the man's apartment yields evidence that matches Sam's profile to the letter. Sam soon realizes the man suffers from multiple personality disorder. Meanwhile, the imprisoned Donald Lucas continues to taunt Sam while George meets with Bailey where they discover that Sam's father, a scientist, participated in experiments that had deadly consequences.
54	12	"Inheritance"	Jon Cassar	Jason Cahill & Doris Egan & Jeff Pinkner	February 6, 1999
People who seem to have nothing in common are being killed in the Southeast USA. Grace's autopsies find that all the victims have the same rare blood type. The team uncovers evidence that confirms all the victims were the children of Chris James Allmon, a Charles Manson-like cult leader currently incarcerated in a Georgia psychiatric facility. Sam interviews the adoptive parents of one of the remaining children and quickly surmises their son, Toby Watson, is the killer. She theorizes that he is killing his siblings to 'cleanse' himself of his deadly lineage. Meanwhile, Sam confronts her father, Walter Anderson, about his unethical viral experiments during the 1960s that led to the mental breakdown of 34 people.
55	13	"Heads, You Lose"	Lee Bonner	Steve Feke & Cynthia Saunders	February 13, 1999
Someone is killing the young and beautiful in Florida's trendy South Beach by decapitating the victims and leaving their heads on public display. Sam profiles that the killer is striking against beautiful people as a result of his low self-esteem. Evidence eventually points to a young shipping magnate, Thomas King, who has squandered his multi-million dollar inheritance on South Beach's cosmopolitan lifestyle. Instead of blaming himself, he is now striking out at those who helped him spend his fortune. Meanwhile, Grace attempts to reconcile the strained relationship she has with her Cuban-American mother (played by Lillian Hurst). The detective on the case, Mario Monagno, falls for Sam and tries to land a date with her.
56	14	"Otis, California"	Richard Compton	Josh Appelbaum & André Nemec	February 20, 1999
When Donald Lucas, the imprisoned Jack-of-All Trades killer, manages to hack onto the Internet, Bailey fears that he is communicating with a disciple. The investigation leads the VCTF to the small and very strange town of Otis in northern California, which is plagued by a series of Jack-of-All-Trade murders. With the assistance of seemingly crackpot Sheriff Ed Post (Dennis Christopher), the team try to find the suspect. But George is abducted by the suspect, who is connected to a reclusive, embittered professor named Philip Menzies, who is later murdered. The search leads to an underground lab where Sam discovers her father once worked for his government-sponsored mind-control experiments, in which Lucas was one of the test subjects.
57	15	"Spree of Love"	Jefery Levy	Clifton Campbell	February 27, 1999
A series of murders across the Southwest leads Sam and the VCTF team to an unlikely couple: a 32-year-old woman, Josie Wells, and a 16-year-old boy, Alex Lopez, who apparently abducted her from her child's soccer field in Boulder, Colorado. Sam figures the woman was apparently the victim of physical abuse as a child and has abandoned her unhappy and lonely married life and reliving her glory days with the boy she met on a help phone line. Meanwhile, Bailey tries to persuade his ex-wife, Janet, not to remarry. He harbors hopes for their own reconciliation.
58	16	"Burnt Offerings"	Kristoffer Tabori	Melinda Snodgrass	March 20, 1999
Sam and the team try to catch a mystic arsonist on the loose in Atlanta. Sam profiles that he apparently risks his own life by setting the fires himself on the spot. After a red herring lead involving a photographer who is on the scene of all the fires, Sam and the team find graffiti messages on walls of the burned out buildings in Persian meaning 'fire god'. The man is apparently seeking a 'chosen one' immune to fire in order take him to the afterlife to meet his deceased wife. Meanwhile, Sam is worried about Chloe when she becomes emotionally withdrawn after one of her classmates becomes a victim of one of the fires.
59	17	"Three Carat Crisis"	Arthur W. Forney	Melinda Snodgrass & Cynthia Saunders	April 3, 1999
Sam and Bailey get caught up in a jewel heist by a trio of mentally unbalanced crooks named Randy, Kate and Stevie, that quickly turns into a hostage situation within the jewelry store. Sam and Bailey struggle to profile the perpetrators and their relationships with one another before any lives are lost. Sam tries to reason with the ringleader, Randy, to give up. Meanwhile on the outside the building, John quarrels with the pompous and overzealous police commander who wants to catch or kill all the perpetrators, even if it means that all of the hostages will be killed.
60	18	"Seduction"	Ian Toynton	Steve Feke	April 10, 1999
George and Sam go undercover as IRS agents at Borden & Associates, a management office in Palm Beach, Florida, because five of their clients have been murdered with one finger from their left hand missing. As Sam profiles the most likely suspect, Bobby O'Hara, who shows a strong interest in her, the firm's shadowy security chief, Leo Cantrell, becomes suspicious of Sam's true identity. Meanwhile, Kevin Miller, an arrogant FBI agent working the case, complicates the investigation much to Bailey's concern for Sam's safety. John works with the local police detective, Lt. Cynthia Ford, in discovering the bodies.
61	19	"Grand Master"	Vern Gillum	Jason Cahill	May 8, 1999
Sam continues to study the case of Bryce Banks, a 13-year-old chess prodigy, whose life might still be in danger and deals with 'Pretender' Jarod (impersonating a police detective named Doyle) who is looking after Bryce. Her fears are proven right when Bryce disappears. Sam and Jarod suspect the enigmatic Father (Ronald Dain) is using the boy in his revenge plans by killing all the members of a top-secret project 20 years before involving brainwashing. This episode concludes a crossover with The Pretender that begins on "End Game".
62	20	"What's Love Got To Do With It"	Richard Compton	Barry M. Schkolnick	June 5, 1999
Sam and Bailey work with FBI field agent Susan Marsh who is tracking Robert Lee Gregg, a conservative civic leader in Atlanta suspected in the killing of six gay men. But their investigation is hampered by Susan's former boyfriend, Richard Russell, who is stalking her. Susan insists she's in control of the situation, but Bailey thinks otherwise when Marsh's boyfriend is murdered and Russell becomes a suspect. Things get worse when Russell targets Bailey and his ex-wife Janet who are now back together. Meanwhile, Sam leaves the investigation and travels to Miami to investigate the disappearance of a local man who may be connected to the Gregg killings, and she finds herself being pursued by Detective Monagno, who still wants to date her.
63	21	"Las Brisas"	Lee Bonner	Clifton Campbell & Stephen Kronish	May 15, 1999
In the two-part season finale, the Donald Lucas trial begins as the team heads out to Mexico where in the small town of Las Brisas, women have been vanishing without a trace for the past year, and some corpses have been discovered. But their investigation is hampered on both sides of the border by the corrupt police chief, Miguel Villalobos, who is under the thumb of a U.S sheriff, J.D. Tollman, who try to derail the VCTF's investigation when the murders lead to a powerful U.S. businessman named James Lofton, who's running a textile factory in Las Brisas and has been seen in the company of local prostitutes, some of whom ended up as victims. While assisting Marta Fernandez, a loyal policewoman with the investigation, Sam and the group commute back and forth to Atlanta for Lucas' trial with testimony from her, Bailey, George, against Lucas. Also testifying on Sam's behalf is Sheriff Ed Post from Otis, California who, unknown to everyone, is actually the real "Jack-of-All-Trades", who has been hiding in the open all this time and using Lucas, his disciple, to get close to Sam.

=== Season 4 (1999–2000) ===
No. overall	No. in season	Title	Directed by	Written by	Original release date
64	1	"Reunion, Part 1"	Lee Bonner	Stephen Kronish	September 25, 1999
The day after getting shot by the real Jack-of-All-Trades, a wounded Bailey calls upon FBI profiler Rachel Burke to find Sam after Jack kidnaps her and subjects her to tortuous mind games by confining her within an abandoned warehouse and trying to get her to be like him in killing to achieve a sense of superiority. In the meantime, Rachel quickly works out the self-serving confessions of Donald Lucas, who she correctly assumes was a pawn in Jack's game and by questioning Samantha's father about her history, finally learns Jack's real identity as Albert Newquay and of his methods.
65	2	"Reunion, Part 2"	Jon Cassar	Hans Beimler	October 2, 1999
A kidnapped Sam stalls for time as "Jack" (Dennis Christopher) twists the facts hoping to convince her that she too will kill -- when the subject and timing are right -- while a recovering Bailey and new profiler Rachel Burke grope for clues about Jack's hideout. But Jack shows a new card when he lures Sam's young daughter, Chloe, into his web of deceit by convincing her that her mother was responsible for her father's slaying.
66	3	"Blind Eye"	Lee Bonner	Clifton Campbell	October 30, 1999
Now a member of the VCTF team, newly relocated Agent Rachel Burke sorts through a series of murders where the killer singles out successful career women and subjects them to perform humiliating housework and compulsive cleaning before posing them naked in kitchens or bathrooms. While Rachel closes in on a suspect whose own timid, fearful wife may be the missing link, she must first overcome her combative relationship with an increasingly skeptical John.
67	4	"Old Ghosts"	Richard Compton	Raymond Hartung	November 6, 1999
An obsessed Malone is haunted by an unsolved case in Georgia concerning several teenage girls who were slain with a knife 15 years ago, and when more older victims are suddenly found - marked with slashes on their bodies -- his focus zeroes in on their original prime suspect who has resurfaced in the area. Once he has the VCTF team on board, he enlists Rachel's help to connect the two crime sprees but his decision to exhume the earlier victims understandably draws the wrath of their grieving parents.
68	5	"Infidelity"	Anson Williams	I.C. Rapoport	November 13, 1999
When Rachel and Bailey investigate a series of Ohio murders in which the mutilated victims are cheating husbands, they suspect that the killer is the vengeful boyfriend of a woman common to all of the dead men... until she offers an unconvincing confession. Meanwhile, the VCTF team must contend with a local sheriff who wants to join their force, Grace must deal with her crumbling marriage and new pregnancy, and George is left limping after a painful car accident.
69	6	"To Serve & Protect"	Sarah Pia Anderson	Meg Jackson	December 4, 1999
When a series of random murder victims are found on the streets of St. Louis, Missouri, Rachel and the VCTF team believe the killer is a military veteran who uses weapons of opportunity, and their focus shifts to an incoherent, ranting homeless person who fits the profile. However, Rachel wonders if she should widen her field of suspects to include any ex-serviceman, and trained killer, who is susceptible to an altered state psychosis. Back at VCTF headquarters in Atlanta, George ignores his increasing reliance on prescription pain pills while recovering from his minor car accident.
70	7	"Original Sin"	James Quinn	Raymond Hartung	December 11, 1999
As Christmas nears, Rachel and the VCTF work into the night in search of a twisted serial killer who goes on-line to select his victims, all of whom are carefully screened, seeking a candidate he can make over into his ideal woman. Meanwhile, Rachel is surprised when her troubled younger brother, Danny, drops in from out of town and displays telltale signs of substance abuse. Also, Rachel finally confronts George about his own addiction to pain pills and other drugs.
71	8	"Train Man"	Vern Gillum	Linda Loiselle Guzik	January 8, 2000
Rachel and Bailey respond to the growing list of isolated elderly men and women who are strangled while riding the rails in the Southwest, and Rachel notes cigarette burns that indicate the young killer must have been a victim of abuse as well. While the killer eyes his next targets, the VCTF theorizes that the dead victims must be surrogates for an angry drifter who feels rejected by society and taking it out on other derelicts. Meanwhile, Rachel begins to suspect George's painkiller addiction due to his increasingly erratic behavior while Bailey quarrels with the by-the-book Arizona Sheriff Cunningham over their investigation.
72	9	"Quid Pro Quo"	Bill L. Norton	I.C. Rapoport	January 15, 2000
The VCTF team search for a serial killer who strangles women with knots of their own hair. But when the latest victim is the daughter of powerful mob boss James Perrone, the FBI profiler must gain the grieving father's confidence to learn more about her habits. Meanwhile, Rachel is under pressure from the Bureau's Organized Crime Division director, Joel Marks, to take advantage of her access to Perrone and wear a wire to trick him into confessing to a fellow mobster's murder, thereby ending a lengthy investigation.
73	10	"Clean Sweep"	Tim Hunter	Clifton Campbell & Hans Beimler	February 5, 2000
The VCTF work with Jarod (Michael T. Weiss) when two dirty Secret Service agents, who are their most direct link to the killers of a fellow agent, are found slain. However, while romantic sparks fly between the pair, Jarod suddenly disappears and is tortured by the murderer Todd Baxter, who is on a crazed mission to eliminate everyone he thinks is involved in the agency's corruption. Meanwhile, Grace learns of George's addition to painkillers and pep pills and tells him to get treatment or she'll have to inform on him. This episode concludes a crossover with The Pretender that begins on "Spin Doctor".
74	11	"Random Act"	James Quinn	Stephen Kronish & I.C. Rapoport	February 12, 2000
When John's girlfriend is hurt during a convenience-store robbery, he shoots one of the criminals. Rachel and Bailey grow concerned that John may seek justice outside the law as his shooting comes under review, leading him to resign out of anger and guilt over his girlfriend's condition.
75	12	"Besieged"	Richard Compton	Jeff Pinkner & Meg Jackson & Raymond Hartung	February 19, 2000
Rachel appears on a radio call-in show at her old college when a rapist calls to play mind games. While searching for the rapist, Rachel reunites with an old boyfriend who has since married her old roommate. She also meets the therapist assigned to her brother's drug rehabilitation. In the meantime, George misses work in his attempt to kick his addiction to painkillers.
76	13	"Proteus"	P.J. Pesce	Hans Beimler	February 26, 2000
Rachel faces charges for a past incident involving Grant while the team searches for a killer. Elsewhere, Rachel becomes more romantic with Tom Arquette. Bailey orders George to get help for his addiction to painkillers.
77	14	"Paradise Lost"	Vern Gillum	Clifton Campbell	March 11, 2000
Rachel and her colleagues track down the killer of a woman and her two daughters. Meanwhile, George's substance abuse problem creates a huge embarrassment just as a congresswoman begins an investigation of the team. Danny finds out about Rachel dating his drug counselor. Just as George takes a leave of absence to resolve his addiction, Rachel receives word that her brother has left rehab.
78	15	"The Long Way Home"	Sarah Pia Anderson	John Fasano	March 18, 2000
Rachel faces her demons on both the professional and personal front. A teenager who escaped abduction leads the team to a kidnapper/killer whom she prosecuted, but was unable to convict due to procedural errors. And when her brother runs away from rehab, she awaits in agony of hearing from or about him. Bailey deals with external pressures from an investigation by a congresswoman, while George worries about his placement on the team during his leave of absence when his replacement Kim Doyle (Judith Moreland) proves competent.
79	16	"House of Cards"	Tim Iacofano	Story by : Linda Loiselle Guzik and I.C. Rapoport; Teleplay by : Paul Barber & Larry Barber	March 25, 2000
The team becomes involved in a standoff against a sniper haunting a public park. Racing against the clock, Rachel tries to find a motive and pattern to discover the sniper's identity. While George waits to hear about his reinstatement, he and Grace console each other when complications arise in her pregnancy.
80	17	"Mea Culpa"	Anson Williams	Michael Sadowski	April 22, 2000
The team links a 12-year-old's abduction from a diner to three recent murders, but has the added pressure of the boy's parents engaged in an intense custody battle. Bailey becomes romantically entangled with the congresswoman investigating the VCTF, but finds himself crossed by her at a congressional hearing as she prepares a battle to defund and disband the unit. Rachel's showdown with Marks intensifies as her home is ransacked, and a crucial piece of evidence against him is stolen and given to his superiors in Washington. Mistaking that Rachel is behind his firing, Marks swears revenge on her.
81	18	"Pianissimo"	Bill L. Norton	Jessica Abrams & Stephen Kronish	April 29, 2000
The team investigates the murder of a pianist who is found disemboweled inside of a piano. But the case becomes complex as it was discovered that the pianist had secretly given birth, leading to two possible different profiles. As the investigation against Marks begins, he begins to stalk and harass Rachel with the help of Kim Doyle, who is revealed to have been planted by Marks. Jarod returns to help Rachel investigate. This episode features Jarod from The Pretender, but does not have a corresponding episode on that show.
82	19	"On Your Marks"	Richard Compton	Stephen Kronish & Clifton Campbell	May 6, 2000
A series of brutal murders around Memphis leads the team to an erotophonophilatic couple. As Marks intensifies his revenge plot against Rachel, Bailey begins to feel guilt and Rachel faces paranoia. Danny is now clean and sober with a job on the loading docks, but soon finds himself a victim of Marks as well. George watches over Grace as goes into a difficult labor; after the birth, he discovers that she has named her baby after him.
83	20	"Tsuris"	P. J. Pesce	Marc Rubel	July 1, 2000
Rachel is devastated when Danny dies from an overdose shortly after her confrontation with Marks. She plunges herself into work with the investigations into the murders of businessmen via electrocution by an unknown device. However, she becomes agonized when her visions connect Marks to the crimes. Meanwhile, rumors fly about the fate of the VCTF as Bailey is forced to supply the personal information of all VCTF agents. Marks kidnaps Rachel, revealing to her that he has been forced into the killings by the unknown serial killer "Damian Kartais". He recruits her to help him bring down Kartais, who hates Rachel for her gift. However, Marks is killed by Kartais. The series ends on a cliffhanger as Rachel is framed with the murder of Marks; and Bailey discovers that the VCTF has lost its funding effective immediately, with its agents reassigned.
