= French Kiss (2015 film) =

- Directed by: John Gray
- Written by: John Gray
- Produced by: David Beebe; Kim Moses; Ian Sander
- Starring: Tyler Ritter; Margot Luciarte
- Cinematography: Joël Labat
- Edited by: Neil Mandelberg
- Music by: Michael A. Levine
- Release date: May 19, 2015
- Running time: 24 minutes
- Countries: United States; France
- Language: English

French Kiss is an American live action short film. It was written and directed by John Gray, and produced by David Beebe, Kim Moses, and Ian Sander. The film was produced by Marriott Hotel's creative content studio in partnership with Sander Moses Productions, and was completely shot in Paris, France.

The film is centered on Ethan, an American in Paris on a business trip. Margaux is a beautiful young Parisian who admires Ethan from afar. Determined to remedy his obsession with work, a mischievous Margaux tricks Ethan into following her and her string of clues all over the city.

The film was released in select theaters and online via YouTube on Marriott's website on May 19, 2015. As of June 9, 2015 it has over 6 million views.

== Cast ==
- Tyler Ritter as Ethan - An American in Paris on business trip who is led on a magical journey across the city by Margaux.
- Margot Luciarte as Margaux - The beautiful and mysterious woman who leads Ethan across the city with her magic.
- Vincent Menjou-Cortès as Waiter - An employee serving an oblivious Ethan at the Marriott cafe.
- Michaël Vander Meiren as Taxi Driver - A Paris cabbie who takes Ethan to a location pointed out on his magical map.
- Cédric Weber as Shopkeeper - A florist who believes Ethan sees a flying laptop but is hesitant to help
- Marc Jarousseau as Man In Kissing Couple - A young man who switches between arguing and passionately kissing his girlfriend when Ethan adjusts his magic glasses.
- Nathalie Odzierejko as Woman in Kissing Couple - A young woman who switches between arguing and passionately kissing her boyfriend when Ethan adjusts his magic glasses.
- Stéphane Dausse as Man Ghost - A ghost in the cemetery who riddles Ethan and directs him where to go next.
- Melissa Jo Peltier as Ghost Woman - A ghost in the cemetery who suggests Ethan visit the Eiffel tower.
- Dee Lay Chérod as Conference Volunteer - A young volunteer who requires Ethan check into the conference.
- Lassana Lestin as Ethan's Boss - A tall and strict man who is furious Ethan is late to the conference.
- Béleina Win as Slick Software Exec. - The conference exec. who introduces Ethan as a guest speaker.

== Music ==
The original soundtrack was composed Michael A. Levine and features songs from several French artists.

== Release ==
The film was released in select theaters and online via YouTube on Marriott's website on May 19, 2015. On the same day a premiere screening was hosted at the Marriott hotel in Marina Del Rey, California. A premiere screening was also hosted in Paris, France at the Marriott Champs Elysees on May 27, 2015.

== Reception ==
Cfayla Johnson (Beach Foodie) said French Kiss is "a stunningly beautiful film about finding love in Paris in the midst of a corporate conference. The energy is joyful, loving, and captivating and gives you 23 minutes of fun."
