= Reckless (American TV series) =

American legal drama television series

- Genre: Legal drama
- Created by: Dana Stevens
- Starring: Anna Wood; Cam Gigandet; Shawn Hatosy; Georgina Haig; Adam Rodríguez; Michael Gladis; Kim Wayans; Gregory Harrison
- Composer: Fil Eisler
- Country of origin: United States
- Original language: English
- No. of seasons: 1
- No. of episodes: 13

Production
- Executive producers: Catherine Hardwicke; Corey Miller; Dana Stevens; Ian Sander; Kim Moses
- Running time: 60 minutes
- Production companies: Sander-Moses Productions; CBS Television Studios

Original release
- Network: CBS
- Release: June 29 – September 13, 2014

Reckless is an American legal drama television series created by Dana Stevens. The series stars Anna Wood, Cam Gigandet, Adam Rodríguez, Shawn Hatosy, Kim Wayans, Gregory Harrison, Michael Gladis, and Georgina Haig. It premiered on CBS on June 29, 2014.

On October 9, 2014, CBS canceled the series after one season.

== Cast ==
=== Main ===
- Anna Wood as Jamie Sawyer, a lawyer originally from Chicago
- Cam Gigandet as Roy Rayder, city attorney for the City of Charleston and a partner in Dec's firm
- Shawn Hatosy as Terry McCandless, a detective in the Charleston PD
- Georgina Haig as Lee Anne Marcus, a waitress and former Charleston PD officer and Jamie's client
- Adam Rodríguez as Preston Cruz, a detective within the Charleston PD and Jamie's ex-boyfriend
- Michael Gladis as Holland Knox, Deputy Chief of the Charleston PD and mayoral candidate
- Kim Wayans as Vi Briggs, Jamie's paralegal employee at her law firm, who serves as the firm's private investigator
- Gregory Harrison as Decatur "Dec" Fortnum, a lawyer and Roy's ex-father-in-law and his partner at their law firm

=== Recurring ===
- Bess Armstrong as Roy's mother, Melinda.
- Falk Hentschel as Lee Anne's husband, Arliss Fulton.
- Kelly Rutherford as Joyce Reed, a councilwoman in Charleston who is running for mayor against Knox.
- Rick Gomez as Russ Waterman, a shady businessman who runs an underground counterfeit weapons ring in Charleston, and sells illegal weapons to the corrupt cops in the Charleston PD.
- David Keith as Terry's father, Pat.
- Emily Baldoni as Nancy Davis, a local television news reporter in Charleston who briefly dated Roy.
- Linda Purl as Decatur's wife, Barbara.
- Susan Walters as Decatur's mistress, Lindsay.
- Owen Teague as Jacob.

== Development and production ==
In March 2013, Georgina Haig and Kim Wayans were the first to be cast as Lee Anne, a police officer from the Charleston PD and Vi, Jamie's paralegal. Shawn Hatosy was cast next as Terry, a police detective in the Charleston PD. Shortly after Anna Wood was cast in the lead female role of Jamie, a gorgeous Yankee litigator as well as Adam Rodriguez as Preston, a well respected police detective who works alongside Terry within the Charleston PD.

On May 12, 2013, Reckless was picked up by CBS for a pilot order with a series order coming shortly after. Shooting for the pilot began on March 22, 2013, in Charleston, South Carolina.

== Reception ==
Reckless has received mixed reviews. On Metacritic, the show holds a score of 46 out of 100, based on 15 critics, indicating "mixed or average" reviews. On Rotten Tomatoes, the show holds a rating of 46% based on 13 reviews.

== Episodes ==
| No. | Title | Directed by | Written by | Original release date | U.S. viewers (millions) |
|---|---|---|---|---|---|
| 1 | "Pilot" | Catherine Hardwicke | Dana Stevens | June 29, 2014 | 3.99 |
When disgraced Charleston cop Lee Anne Marcus is fired for sending pictures of herself using the police department's email, she decides to sue and hires defense attorney Jamie Sawyer, who has relocated from Chicago. Roy Rayder, the newly appointed city attorney, takes the department's case. It is revealed that multiple cops might have had sex with another fellow officer, one after the other, and the victim has no memory of that night and was probably drugged.
| 2 | "Parting Shots" | John Gray | Dana Stevens | July 6, 2014 | 3.77 |
Jamie and Roy take on clients on opposite sides of a heated custody battle with Jamie is the wife's attorney whereas Roy works for the husband. In the course of the case, someone takes a shot at the wife making it even more confused. Meanwhile, Roy struggles with what to do with the missing footage from the police department sex tape. When Jamie asks to see it, Roy learns that the missing footage had been sabotaged.
| 3 | "Stand Your Ground" | Stephen Surjik | Corey Miller | July 13, 2014 | 3.94 |
As Lee Anne's lawsuit against the police department continues to scandalize the city, a judge suggests that she accept a settlement offer. At the same time, Jamie and Roy argue opposing sides of a "stand your ground" case.
| 4 | "Blind Sides" | Ed Ornelas | Allen MacDonald | July 20, 2014 | 3.96 |
Two football players are accused of killing their coach. Jamie and Roy must work together to clear their names.
| 5 | "Bloodstone" | Michael Apted | Brian Oh | July 27, 2014 | 4.07 |
Jamie dedicates herself to clearing the name of a pro bono client wrongfully accused of murder, and enlists Roy's help with the case. Meanwhile, Knox faces a moral dilemma regarding the Lee Anne Marcus case as he considers running for mayor.
| 6 | "Family Plot" | John Gray | Corinne Brinkerhoff | August 3, 2014 | 4.29 |
Roy agrees to represent his ex-wife Shelby's fiance in a disputed property deal which may have resulted in murder. Jamie awaits the results of Lee Anne's drug test done via the use of her hair.
| 7 | "Deep Waters" | Joshua Butler | Paul Sciarrotta | August 17, 2014 | 4.32 |
When an affluent Charleston socialite goes missing after a boating accident, Jamie and Roy face off over the ensuing wrongful death suit brought against the city. All the while, the tension between Jamie and Roy heats up when they share a dance at the Mayor's ball. Lee Anne finds support from an unlikely ally, as her case is threatened when another woman brings similar charges of sexual harassment against the city. Dec's mistress Lindsay is pregnant and she tells him, despite his wife telling her not to.
| 8 | "When the Smoke Clears" | Eric Laneuville | Jon Worley | August 24, 2014 | 3.96 |
Roy defends his former high school sweetheart against murder charges, which puts his family's reputation and his law firm position on the line. Meanwhile, Lee Anne tries to end her relationship with Terry forever and Preston's undercover assignment goes to a dangerous conclusion.
| 9 | "Damage Control" | Randy Zisk | Denise Hahn | August 30, 2014 | 2.99 |
Terry is asked by Roy to testify against Lee Anne in court, in the hopes of getting her lawsuit thrown out of court. Because of this, Terry considers turning his back on Lee Anne. After being undercover, Preston had been found out right before being shot. Knox's boss threatens to fire him if he doesn't comply with having Terry and Preston being held as heroes. Also, Jamie goes up against Dec in court. While Preston is fighting for his life, Jamie learns from Knox that he had been working undercover.
| 10 | "Fifty-One Percent" | Coky Giedroyc | Kathryn Miller Kelley | August 31, 2014 | 4.36 |
Jamie and Roy face off in civil court as Charleston reacts to the Lee Anne Marcus sex tape being leaked to the media. Meanwhile, Knox faces a moral dilemma when he discovers a dirty secret that could derail Joyce Reed's mayoral campaign.
| 11 | "And So It Begins" | Jan Eliasberg | Devon Greggory | September 7, 2014 | 4.68 |
When Vi's ex-husband is accused of medical malpractice, Jamie works to clear his name, only to find out that a relationship with a former patient could put his entire career at risk. Jury selection in Lee Anne's case is complicated by a possible planted juror. Meanwhile the love triangle between Jamie, Roy and Preston gets even hotter.
| 12 | "Civil Wars (Part 1)" | Ian Sander | Corey Miller | September 13, 2014 | 2.92 |
Jamie and Roy are on opposite sides of the biggest courtroom battle of their careers when Lee Anne's sexual harassment case against the Charleston Police Department finally goes to trial.
| 13 | "Civil Wars (Part 2)" | John Gray | Dana Stevens | September 13, 2014 | 3.63 |
The verdict on the Lee Anne Marcus trial is announced. Also, Jamie and Roy decide whether or not they are ready to take the next step in their relationship.

== Ratings ==
Reckless premiered to 3.99 million viewers and at 0.6 in the 18-49 demo. The least watched episode is the twelfth, "Civil Wars: (Part 1)", with 2.92 million viewers. The most watched episode to date is the eleventh, "And So It Begins", with a series high of 4.68 million viewers.

Beginning July 13, the show moved from 9:00 pm Sunday to 10:00 pm Sunday.

| Season | Number of episodes | Time slot (EST) | Premiere | | Finale | | TV season | Average viewers (millions) | Average ratings (18-49) |
| Season | Number of episodes | Time slot (EST) | Date | Viewers (millions) | Date | Viewers (millions) | TV season | Average viewers (millions) | Average ratings (18-49) |
|---|---|---|---|---|---|---|---|---|---|
| 1 | 13 | Sunday 9:00 pm (Episodes 1-2); Sunday 10:00 pm (Episodes 3-13) | June 29, 2014 | 3.99 | September 13, 2014 | 3.63 | 2014 | 4.0 | 0.6 |

=== U.S. live ratings ===
| Episode number | Title | Original air date | Viewers (in millions) | Ratings share (Adults 18–49) |
|---|---|---|---|---|
| 1 | "Pilot" | June 29, 2014 | 3.99 | 0.6 |
| 2 | "Parting Shots" | July 6, 2014 | 3.77 | 0.6 |
| 3 | "Stand Your Ground" | July 13, 2014 | 3.94 | 0.5 |
| 4 | "Blind Sides" | July 20, 2014 | 3.96 | 0.6 |
| 5 | "Bloodstone" | July 27, 2014 | 4.07 | 0.6 |
| 6 | "Family Plot" | August 3, 2014 | 4.29 | 0.6 |
| 7 | "Deep Waters" | August 17, 2014 | 4.32 | 0.5 |
| 8 | "When the Smoke Clears" | August 24, 2014 | 3.96 | 0.5 |
| 9 | "Damage Control" | August 30, 2014 | 2.99 | 0.5 |
| 10 | "Fifty-One Percent" | August 31, 2014 | 4.36 | 0.9 |
| 11 | "And So It Begins" | September 7, 2014 | 4.68 | 0.7 |
| 12 | "Civil Wars" | September 13, 2014 | 2.92 | 0.6 |
| 13 | "Civil Wars (Part 2)" | September 13, 2014 | 3.63 | 0.5 |

== Home media ==
The full complete series was released on DVD as for CBS Home Entertainment on April 14, 2020.

== International broadcast ==
The program premiered on Network Ten in Australia on October 8, 2014, rating a very low 79,000 viewers. In Latin America the series premiered on Cinemax on August 5, 2014. Alibi secured the airing rights in the United Kingdom, and were to begin airing the show from April 10, 2015, at 9 p.m.
