= Ghost Whisperer =

American supernatural drama TV series (2005–2010)

- Genre: Supernatural drama; Fantasy
- Created by: John Gray
- Starring: Jennifer Love Hewitt; Aisha Tyler; David Conrad; Camryn Manheim; Jay Mohr; Christoph Sanders; Jamie Kennedy
- Composers: Mark Snow; Dan Beyer ("Body of Water")
- Country of origin: United States
- Original language: English
- No. of seasons: 5
- No. of episodes: 107 (list of episodes)

Production
- Executive producers: John Gray (seasons 1–3); Ian Sander; Kim Moses; Jennifer Love Hewitt (season 5)
- Producer: Jennifer Love Hewitt
- Running time: 42–44 minutes
- Production companies: Sander/Moses Productions; CBS Television Studios (Note: Known as Paramount Television for season 1 and CBS Paramount Television for seasons 2–4); ABC Studios (Note: Known as Touchstone Television for seasons 1–2)

Original release
- Network: CBS
- Release: September 23, 2005 – May 21, 2010

Ghost Whisperer is an American supernatural television series, which ran on CBS from September 23, 2005, to May 21, 2010.

The series follows the life of Melinda Gordon (Jennifer Love Hewitt), who has the ability to see and communicate with ghosts. While trying to live as normal a life as possible—she is married and owns an antique store—Melinda helps earthbound spirits resolve their problems and cross over into the light, or the spirit world. Her tasks are difficult and at times she struggles with people who push her away and do not believe in her gift. In addition, the ghosts are mysterious and sometimes menacing at first, and Melinda must use the clues available to her to understand the spirits' needs and help them. The show was created by John Gray and was produced by Sander/Moses Productions, executive producer, and Jennifer Love Hewitt in association with ABC Studios and CBS Television Studios.

On May 18, 2010, CBS canceled the series after five seasons.

== Premise ==
Melinda Gordon (Jennifer Love Hewitt) is a young woman from the town of Grandview, New York, who has the ability to see and communicate with the dead. Melinda lives with her husband, Jim Clancy (David Conrad), and later their son Aiden (Connor Gibbs). She owns a shop called "Same as It Never Was Antiques".

Each ghost seeks Melinda's help in relaying a message or completing a task that will put their spirit to rest, and allow them to cross over into the light. Those who died with unfinished business become earthbound and cannot cross over, and Melinda, as their earthly representative, helps them to find peace. The show does not present the ghosts as having sinned; rather it is the spirits' own guilt that condemns them, and their own fear of judgment that keeps them from "crossing over" into an afterlife.

The series also starred Aisha Tyler as Andrea Marino, Melinda's best friend, who runs the antique shop with her. Andrea is killed in the finale of season 1 when she was driving to her brother's apartment located in the city. During the premiere of season 2, Melinda meets Delia Banks (Camryn Manheim), a struggling real estate agent who forms a friendship with Melinda and who eventually agrees to run the antique shop with her. Delia is a widow. Her husband died prior to the show. Delia is shocked to find out about Melinda's abilities; in fact, at first she claims Melinda needs psychological help. Delia eventually accepts Melinda's gift, though she remains skeptical at times. Delia has a son named Ned Banks (Tyler Patrick Jones and Christoph Sanders) who finds out about Melinda's gift long before his mother does.

Melinda also forms a friendship with Rick Payne (Jay Mohr), a professor at Rockland University. He helps Melinda solve the conflicts of ghosts throughout the Ghost Whisperer season 2 and season 3. He departs in the fourth season premiere for an expedition in the Himalayas. The same episode introduced Eli James (Jamie Kennedy), another professor at the university, who goes through a near-death experience which unlocks an ability to hear ghosts. Unlike Melinda, he cannot see them. He becomes a close friend to Melinda and helps her investigate the hauntings.

== Episodes ==
Season	Episodes	Originally released	
Season	Episodes	First released	Last released
1	22	September 23, 2005	May 5, 2006
2	22	September 22, 2006	May 11, 2007
3	18	September 28, 2007	May 16, 2008
4	23	October 3, 2008	May 15, 2009
5	22	September 25, 2009	May 21, 2010

== Cast ==
- Jennifer Love Hewitt as Melinda Gordon
- Aisha Tyler as Andrea Marino (seasons 1–2) (Note: In season 2, Aisha Tyler is credited a main cast member in the first episode only.)
- David Conrad as Jim Clancy / Sam Lucas
- Camryn Manheim as Delia Banks (seasons 2–5) (Note: In season 2, Camryn Manheim is credited a main cast member from the second episode onwards.)
- Jay Mohr as Professor Rick Payne (recurring season 2; main season 3; special guest season 4)
- Tyler Patrick Jones (season 2) and Christoph Sanders (seasons 3–5) as Ned Banks (recurring seasons 2–3; main seasons 4–5)
- Jamie Kennedy as Professor Eli James (seasons 4–5)

== Production ==
=== Development ===
Ghost Whisperer is based in part on the work of Mary Ann Winkowski. Development of the show dates back to at least two years before its premiere. James Van Praagh was a co-executive producer and consultant on the show.

The show was produced by Sander/Moses Productions in association with CBS Television Studios (originally Paramount Network Television) in season one and ABC Studios (originally Touchstone Television in the first two seasons) and CBS Paramount Network Television in seasons two to four.

The show was filmed on the Universal Studios back lot in Los Angeles. Cast and crew members said they believed that the set got visits from real spirits. After the show's cancellation and shortly before the sets were torn down, Jennifer Love Hewitt filmed a tour demonstrating the ways in which the areas were different from those shown in the TV broadcast.

Sound effects were completed at Smart Post Sound. Visual effects for the pilot and some season one episodes were completed at Flash Film Works. Visual effects for nearly the entire series were created at Eden FX. Roy Forge Smith, who frequently collaborated with John Gary, was the production designer on 44 episodes of the show, spanning two seasons, from 2005 to 2007.

== Release ==
=== Broadcast ===
Season one premiered on September 23, 2005, and ended on May 5, 2006. It received an average of 10.20 million viewers. Season two of Ghost Whisperer premiered on September 22, 2006, and ended on May 11, 2007, again airing Friday nights on CBS during the same timeslot. CBS officially renewed the show for a third season placing it in its regular Friday 8 p.m. ET time slot. The third season premiered September 28, 2007. Twelve episodes were completed before the Writers Guild of America strike, and once the strike ended, CBS had announced that the show would return April 4, 2008, with six episodes. On February 15, 2008, CBS renewed Ghost Whisperer for a fourth season. For the fourth season, Jamie Kennedy joined the cast as Psychology professor Eli James. Jay Mohr left after the first episode as the plot had his character, Professor Rick Payne, going on sabbatical (Mohr took a role in Gary Unmarried). Recurring cast member Christoph Sanders joined as a regular cast member. The fourth season of Ghost Whisperer premiered on Friday, October 3, 2008, and concluded on May 15, 2009, and consisted of 23 episodes. In an interview by P.K. Simonds with E! Online, it was announced that Ghost Whisperer would return for a fifth season. CBS renewed Ghost Whisperer for the fifth season on May 20, 2009, which began airing on Friday, September 25, 2009, at 8 p.m. ET and ran for 22 episodes.

=== Syndication ===
On May 5, 2008, it was announced that the first three seasons of Ghost Whisperer were purchased for $169.8 million ($700,000 per episode, per network) for syndication by SYFY, Ion Television, and WeTV. Episodes began airing in mid-2009 on ION, and in the third quarter of 2009 on SYFY and We. The first four seasons began airing in syndication on CBC Television in Canada on August 31, 2009. It currently airs on Start TV every day at 5:00 AM EST.

=== Home media ===
The Region 1 DVD releases are distributed by Paramount Home Entertainment/CBS DVD, while releases in all other regions are distributed by Walt Disney Studios Home Entertainment (formerly Buena Vista Home Entertainment).

On March 17, 2015, CBS DVD released Ghost Whisperer - The Complete Series on DVD in Region 1.

Season	Specifications	Special features	Release dates
1	22 episodes; 6 discs; Video: Anamorphic widescreen 1.78:1 aspect ratio; Audio: Dolby Digital 5.1 Surround; No subtitles	Audio commentaries; Blooper reel; Deleted scenes; Two featurettes; Virtual tour: Grandview; Ghost Whisperer Mythology; Scare Tactics	Region 1 October 31, 2006 Region 2 July 9, 2007 (Europe); April 23, 2008 (Japan) Region 3 May 29, 2007 (Hong Kong); June 19, 2007 (Korea) Region 4 May 23, 2007 (Australia) October 22, 2007 (Brazil)
2	22 episodes; 6 discs; Video: Anamorphic widescreen 1.78:1 aspect ratio; Audio: Dolby Digital 5.1 Surround; Closed captioned	Audio commentaries; Behind-the-scenes featurettes; The Other Side webseries; Tarot cards; Music video	Region 1 September 18, 2007 Region 2 February 25, 2008 Region 3 April 8, 2008 (Hong Kong); July 26, 2008 (Korea) Region 4 April 2, 2008 (Australia) September 12, 2008 (Brazil)
3	18 episodes; 5 discs; Video: Anamorphic widescreen 1.78:1 aspect ratio; Audio: Dolby Digital 5.1 Surround; Closed captioned	Audio commentaries; Behind-the-scenes featurettes; The Other Side II web series; Interactive games; Interactive Haunted House; Interactive Mash up; Melinda's Haunted Diary	Region 1 September 2, 2008 Region 2 April 6, 2009 Region 3 March 3, 2009 Region 4 March 12, 2009 (Australia) May 12, 2009 (Brazil)
4	23 episodes; 6 discs; Video: Anamorphic widescreen 1.78:1 aspect ratio; Audio: Dolby Digital 5.1 Surround; Closed captioned	Audio commentaries; Behind-the-scenes featurettes; The Other Side III web series	Region 1 September 22, 2009 Region 2 March 1, 2010 Region 3 N/A Region 4 March 9, 2010 (Australia) May 12, 2010 (Brazil) March 10, 2010 (Argentina)
5	22 episodes; 6 discs; Video: Anamorphic widescreen 1.78:1 aspect limo; Audio: Dolby Digital 5.1 Surround; Closed captioned	Audio commentaries; Behind-the-scenes featurettes; Celebrating 100; A Triple Threat; A Season of Changes; The Other Side IV web series; Ghost Town; Ghosts of Rockland Memorial	Region 1 October 12, 2010 Region 2 March 21, 2011 Region 3 N/A Region 4 March 2, 2011 (Australia) TBA (Brazil) TBA (Argentina)

=== Streaming ===
The series is available to stream on The CW's free digital-only network, CW Seed.

The show's first 4 seasons are available on Hulu in the US and all 5 seasons are available on its sister streaming service Disney+ internationally.

== Reception ==
=== U.S. ratings ===
Season	Episodes	Originally aired		U.S Seasonal rankings (based on average total viewers per episode)		
Season	Episodes	Season premiere	Season finale	Rank	Rating/share (18–49 demo)	Viewers (in millions)
1	22	September 23, 2005	May 5, 2006	#47	2.9/10	10.20
2	22	September 22, 2006	May 11, 2007	#44	3.0/10	9.90
3	18	September 28, 2007	May 16, 2008	#64	2.4/8	8.67
4	23	October 3, 2008	May 15, 2009	#34	3.7/11	10.62
5	22	September 25, 2009	May 21, 2010	#54	1.9/6	7.78

Episodes in the first half of the fourth season won their time slot every week in viewers, and across all age demographics, including the 18–49 age bracket, and also usually won the night for CBS as the most-watched show on Friday nights. Furthermore, fourteen episodes from Season 4 surpassed 10 million viewers, of which seven surpassed 11 million viewers.

=== Cancellation ===
On May 18, 2010, citing rising costs and a decline in viewership, CBS announced that Ghost Whisperer would not be renewed for another season. ABC expressed interest in picking up Ghost Whisperer for the 2010–11 U.S. television season; however, on May 27, 2010, Michael Ausiello reported that ABC had passed on renewing Ghost Whisperer for a sixth season.

In 2010, Zap2it declared Ghost Whisperer the second "most missed axed show" after a poll determined 19.4 percent of voters would miss it.

In October 2010, Jennifer Love Hewitt thanked the fans of the show for their support in a goodbye video (filmed in June 2010), saying "Your love and support has meant everything to the cast and crew of Ghost Whisperer and we will all miss you guys very, very much. Go get our DVDs, think about us, miss us and know how much we all will miss you. Much love."

In January 2011, Hewitt told the press of her opinion about the cancellation, saying "When you've taken people on a journey for so long, the least you can do is give them a goodbye. For a show that was about unfinished business, we didn't get to finish."

In January 2018, Hewitt was really adamant about a potential reboot or revival: "If they're going to redo it, then I have to go back and be the ghost whisperer because I am not giving up my "Ghost Whisperer" throne. That part just meant too much to me, and it was so much of who I was, I worked really hard to make Melinda who she is. So if they wanted to do a 10-episode revival on Netflix, like finishing the series or something, I'm happy to do that. But giving it over to somebody would crush me."

=== Awards and nominations ===
Year	Group	Award	Recipient	Result	Refs
2006	Saturn Awards	Best Actress on Television	Jennifer Love Hewitt	Nominated	
2006	Emmy Awards	Outstanding Main Title Design	Ghost Whisperer	Nominated	
2006	Kids' Choice Awards	Favorite Television Actress	Jennifer Love Hewitt	Nominated	
2006	Teen Choice Awards	TV—Choice Breakout Show	Ghost Whisperer	Nominated	
2006	Young Artist Awards	Best Performance in a Television Series (Comedy or Drama) – Guest Starring Young Actor	Joseph Castanon	Won	
2007	Saturn Awards	Best Actress in a Television Program	Jennifer Love Hewitt	Won	
2007	Emmy Awards	Outstanding Music Composition for a Series (Original Dramatic Score)	Episode: "Love Never Dies"	Nominated	
2007	Teen Choice Awards	Choice TV Actress: Drama	Jennifer Love Hewitt	Nominated	
2007	Young Artist Awards	Best Performance in a TV Series – Guest Starring Young Actress	Jenna Boyd	Nominated	
2008	Saturn Awards	Best Actress on Television	Jennifer Love Hewitt	Won	
2008	TV Land Awards	Favorite Character from the "Other Side"	Jennifer Love Hewitt	Nominated	
2008	Young Artist Awards	Best Performance in a TV Series – Guest Starring Young Actress	Isabelle Fuhrman	Nominated	
2009	GLAAD Media Awards	Outstanding Individual Episode (in a series without a regular LGBT character)	Episode: "Slam"	Nominated	
2009	Emmy Awards	Outstanding Special Visual Effects For A Series	Episode: "Ghost In The Machine"	Nominated	
2009	Emmy Awards	Outstanding Music Composition For A Series (original Dramatic Score)	Episode: "Leap Of Faith"	Nominated	
2009	Saturn Awards	Best Actress on Television	Jennifer Love Hewitt	Nominated	
2009	Visual Effects Society Award	Outstanding Visual Effects in a Broadcast Series	Episode: "Ghost in the Machine" — Armen Kevorkian, Arthur J. Codron, Matt Scharf, & Stefan Bredereck	Nominated	
2009	Visual Effects Society Award	Outstanding Models and Miniatures in a Broadcast Program or Commercial	Episode: "Save Our Souls" – Claridon Ship Shots, Eric Hance	Nominated	
2010	Saturn Award	Best Series on Television	Ghost Whisperer	Nominated	
2010	Saturn Award	Best Actress on Television	Jennifer Love Hewitt	Nominated	
2010	Young Artist Awards	Best Performance in a TV Series – Recurring Young Actress	Madison Leisle	Nominated	
2010	Young Artist Awards	Guest Starring Young Actor 14 and Over	Hunter Gomez	Nominated	
2011	Young Artist Awards	Guest Starring Young Actress Ten and Under	Joey King	Nominated	
2011	Young Artist Awards	Guest Starring Young Actor 14–17	Billy Unger	Nominated	
2011	Young Artist Awards	Guest Starring Young Actor 14–17	Joey Luthman	Nominated	
2011	Young Artist Awards	Guest Starring Young Actress Ten and Under	Samantha Bailey	Won	
2011	Young Artist Awards	Recurring Young Actor Ten and Under	Connor Gibbs	Won	

== In other media ==
=== Webisodes ===
Ghost Whisperer: The Other Side is a series of webisodes that serves as a companion to the television series. A total of 32 webisodes were produced across four seasons from 2007 to 2010, with eight episodes per season. The series was written by series creator Kim Moses and distributed through CBS's broadband platforms, including the Innertube channel and later CBS.com. Each season featured corporate sponsorship from Saturn and GMC vehicles.

==== Seasons 1–2 (2007–2008) ====
Directed by Claudio Fäh, the first two seasons follow Zach (Mark Hapka), a delivery boy who dies in a bicycle accident. Zach believes his friend Danny (Matthew Alan) killed him and begins haunting Danny in an act of revenge. After an act of revenge causes Danny to fall out of a window, Zach eventually realizes his death was an accident. Learning about medium Melinda Gordon from another spirit, Zach decides to seek her help. He appears in the Season 2 finale of Ghost Whisperer, "The Gathering" (May 11, 2007), where he is dragged into the Dark Side just after approaching Melinda on the street.

Season 2 continues with Zach trapped in the Dark Side as consequence for his vengeful actions against Danny. With guidance from a mentor spirit named BJ (Lucas Alifano), Zach eventually redeems himself and is freed. Zach later appears in the television series' Season 3 episode "Deadbeat Dads" (May 2, 2008), where Melinda helps him cross over into the light.

==== Season 3 (2009) ====
Directed by Félix Enríquez Alcalá, Season 3 introduces Mark (Justin Loyal Baker), a ghost who attempts to help his living high school crush Olivia (Jaimi Paige) realize her fiancé George (Ryan Deal) does not truly love her. Mark is able to talk to Olivia by manipulating her friend Stacey's (Zarah Mahler) vehicle's GPS navigation system. After Olivia ends her engagement, Mark finds wedding rings in what he believes is Stacey's car and uses them to propose to Olivia. Olivia declines, stating she needs to find happiness independently. After learning from Stacey that the rings came from Melinda Gordon's car, which had been temporarily parked in Stacey's spot, Olivia and Mark travel to Grandview to return them. They make brief, uncredited appearances in the television series' Season 4, Episode 21, "Cursed" (May 1, 2009), as Melinda digs for the rings in her car.

==== Season 4 (2010) ====
Directed by Larry Carroll, the fourth season follows the Tyler family, consisting of James (Mark Lutz), Meg (Kasey Wilson), and their daughter Daisy (Hailey Sole), as they move into a house haunted by the ghost of Bo Thompson (Matt Knudsen). The family experiences escalating poltergeist activity, including furniture being moved, locked doors, and objects flying across rooms. The parents consult multiple books for guidance, including the real-world books Ghost Whisperer: Spirit Guide, an official companion book to the TV series by executive producers Kim Moses and Ian Sander, and When Ghosts Speak by Mary Ann Winkowski, the paranormal consultant for the television series. When Bo overhears them discussing how to remove him, he ties them up in retaliation. Daisy finds her parents restrained and tells Bo to leave, which he does. The web series finale aired on May 21, 2010, the same day as the television series' final episode, "The Children's Parade".

=== Internet promotion ===
andshamethedevil.net was a site linked to Ghost Whisperer. The site is mentioned in the Season 3 premiere. By clicking on the star in the upper right hand corner, the site appeared to crack into pieces. Those pieces could be moved by dragging, revealing the message: "Meet Me In The Underworld". Small type at the bottom of the page read the repeated words: "bloody mary. bloody mary. bloody mary." Clicking on the word "bloody" led to another site, rubloodymary.com. There was a hidden message under the graphic. By holding down the mouse key and dragging it around, a new image would appear along with the message. andshamethedevil.net is no longer active.

In the series, penthius.info is often used by Melinda to look up information about the families and ghosts that she is investigating in Grandview. A real-world version of this site was created in February 2008. The site description read: "Penthius.Info is a free search engine and video super site based on the search engine in the television series The Ghost Whisperer with Jennifer Love Hewitt." It was first mentioned in a post on TV.com by misscalais, a fan who created the site to promote the show.

Ghost Whisperer was also heavily promoted on the website, House of Ghost Whisperer built and maintained by Scott L. Spencer.

=== Video game ===
In July 2009, Legacy Interactive announced a licensing agreement with CBS Consumer Products to develop a video game based on the Ghost Whisperer television series. In January 2010, it was announced that the game was set to debut on the PC and Mac and include characters and themes from the show. On November 1, 2010, a developer diary was posted on the game's website, detailing areas in the game and confirming that Melinda, Jim, Delia and Eli will feature. The release date, which was initially early 2010, was changed to 2011 and the subtitle announced in the original press release, Shadowlands, was dropped from the game. The game was written by Emmy award-winning television writer Lance Gentile. It was released on August 7, 2012, exclusively at Wal-Mart.

== See also ==
- List of ghost films
- El don de Alba (remake)
