= Anna Wood (actress) =

American actor

- Wood in 2014
- Born: Mount Airy, North Carolina
- Education: University of North Carolina School of the Arts
- Occupation: Actress
- Years active: 2009–present
- Spouse: Dane DeHaan (m. 2012)
- Children: 2

Anna Wood is an American film, stage, and television actress. Her credits include Cold Case (2009), Brothers & Sisters (2010), Mad Men (2012), NCIS: Los Angeles (2012), Madam Secretary (2014), Deception (2013), Reckless (2014), Falling Water (2016), The Good Wife (2016), The Code (2019), Law & Order: Special Victims Unit (2021), and Watson (2026).

== Early life ==
Wood was born and raised in Mount Airy, North Carolina. She was only six years of age whe she performed acting in community theatre. At age seven she performed in a production of Peter Pan. She obtained a BFA in acting at the University of North Carolina School of the Arts, where she also met her husband-to be Dane DeHaan who also studied there.

== Career ==
Her first appearnance on screen was in 2009 in episode of Cold Case. She secured a recurring role in the NBC television drama series Deception (2013), and starred as attorney Jamie Sawyer in the CBS legal drama series Reckless (2014). She played "The Woman in Red" in the USA supernatural drama series Falling Water (2016). She has also appeared in Brothers & Sisters (2010), Mad Men (2012), NCIS: Los Angeles (2012), Madam Secretary (2014), and The Good Wife (2016).

In 2019, she landed a main role as Captain Maya Dobbins in the CBS military drama series The Code.

== Personal life ==
Anna Wood married actor Dane DeHaan on June 30, 2012, in the Blue Ridge Mountains in Virginia. They met at the University of North Carolina School of the Arts in Winston-Salem, North Carolina during high school and began dating in 2006. They have a daughter born in 2017 and a son born in 2020. They now (2016) live in Williamsburg, Brooklyn.

== Filmography ==
=== Films ===
Year	Title	Role	Notes
2010	Nice Guy Johnny	Claire	
2010	Delusions of Love: A Case Study in Jealousy and 19th Century Formal Wear	Joanne	Short film
2010	The Layla Project	Jackie	Short film
2011	Negative Space	Elizabeth Axelrod	
2012	Chronicle	Monica	

=== Television ===
Year	Title	Role	Notes
2009	Cold Case	Kristi Duren '86	Season 7, Episode 6
2009	Royal Pains	Ana	Season 1, Episode 10
2010	Brothers & Sisters	Young Sarah Walker	Season 4, Episode 18
2012	Mad Men	Janet "Lakshmi" Bennett	Episode: "Christmas Waltz"
2012	NCIS: Los Angeles	House Sitter	Season 3, Episode 20
2012	House of Lies	Courtney Pelios	Season 1, Episode 11
2013	Trooper	Dakota	TV movie
2013	Deception	Nichole Frishette	6 episodes
2014	Reckless	Jamie Sawyer	TV series
2014	Madam Secretary	NSA Officer Sarah Eckhart	2 Episodes
2015	The Following	Juliana Barnes	Season 3, Episodes 3 & 5
2016	The Good Wife	Kristen Balko	Season 7, Episode 6
2016	Falling Water	The Woman in Red	Pilot
2019	The Code	Maya Dobbins	Main role
2020	Bull	Vivian Cahill	Episode: "Flesh and Blood"
2021	Law & Order: Special Victims Unit	Diana Richards	Episode: "What Can Happen in the Dark"
2025	Law & Order	Nicole Potter	Episode: "Look the Other Way"
2026	Watson	Shelly Davis	Episode: "Respect the Process. Respect the Quirks"
