= The Children's Parade =

- Ghost Whisperer episode
- Episode no.: Season 5 Episode 22
- Directed by: John Gray
- Written by: John Gray
- Production code: 522
- Original air date: May 21, 2010

Episode chronology
← Previous "Dead Ringer"	Next → —
- Ghost Whisperer (season 5)

"The Children's Parade" is the series finale of the American supernatural television series Ghost Whisperer, due to its cancellation on May 18, 2010. It is the 22nd and final episode of the show's fifth season, and the 107th episode overall. It originally aired on May 21, 2010 on CBS in the United States.

== Plot ==
Melinda and Jim have told Aiden ghosts aren't real, and neither are the shadows and shinies, but he didn't stop seeing them. Melinda can no longer tell the dead from the living. Eli has trouble talking because of a toothache, but when Carl asks him why Melinda is ignoring him, Eli says he told her Aiden shouldn't see ghosts, and he reveals that he must have been possessed by the shadows when he said that, because he would never normally say such a thing, since it is the worst time for Aiden not to use his gift.

At the hospital, the ghost of a thirteen-year-old boy is leading the child ghosts of polio victims on marches to show they are not afraid of the shadows. Melinda gets taken over by the shadows, and when Carl sees Aiden talking to someone he can't see, Aiden reveals that it's a shiny- or the crossed over ghost of a child. After the Book of Changes tells Carl and Eli how to stop the shadows, Aiden must convince the shinies to help. Mel and Aiden cross over the polio victims and the boy. Mel and Jim tell Aiden they were wrong to try to get him to deny his gift.

== Cast ==
=== Main cast ===
- Jennifer Love Hewitt as Melinda Gordon
- David Conrad as Jim Clancy
- Camryn Manheim as Delia Banks
- Christoph Sanders as Ned Banks
- Jamie Kennedy as Eli James
- Connor Gibbs as Aiden Lucas

=== Guest Starring ===
- Nick Hodaly as Fred the Janitor
- Billy Unger as Pete
- George Wendt as George the Plumber
- Asante Jones as Stuart
- Jack Donner as Man in Hospital Gown
- Peter Holden as Darren
- Tammy Townsend as Jacqueline
- Zayne Emory as Pig Mask Kid
- Rebecca McFarland as Joan

=== Recurring ===
- Joey King as Cassidy

== Reception ==
The episode averaged 6.85 million viewers, rating of 1.6/7 and a share of 9. Isabelle Carreau commented on the episode as a surprise because of the "happy ending and no cliffhangers", although there still were unfinished storylines. She also commented on how quickly the Shadows were destroyed without fulfilling the promise of an action-packed episode and an epic battle.

== Cancellation ==
On May 18, 2010 CBS announced that Ghost Whisperer would not return for a sixth season. After the cancellation on May 18, 2010 it was rumored that ABC would produce a sixth season because it produced the show along with CBS. On May 27, 2010, Michael Ausiello confirmed the show's cancellation.
