= Profiler (TV series) =

American crime drama television series

- Genre: Crime drama
- Created by: Cynthia Saunders
- Starring: Ally Walker; Robert Davi; Julian McMahon; Roma Maffia; Michael Whaley; Peter Frechette; Erica Gimpel; Caitlin Wachs; Heather McComb; Traci Lords; Jamie Luner
- Theme music composer: Angelo Badalamenti
- Country of origin: United States
- Original language: English
- No. of seasons: 4
- No. of episodes: 83 (list of episodes)

Production
- Executive producers: Clifton Campbell; Stephen Kronish; Kim Moses; Ian Sander
- Producers: John Forrest Niss; Lorie Zerweck; Charles Holland; Anthony Santa Croce
- Production companies: Sander/Moses Productions; Three Putt Productions (1998–2000; seasons 3–4); NBC Studios

Original release
- Network: NBC
- Release: September 21, 1996 – July 1, 2000

Profiler is an American crime drama created by Cynthia Saunders that aired on NBC from September 21, 1996, to July 1, 2000. The series follows the exploits of a criminal profiler working with the fictional FBI Violent Crimes Task Force (VCTF) based in Atlanta, Georgia.

The show initially starred Ally Walker as profiler Dr. Samantha Waters, the victim of a stalker known as "Jack of All Trades". At the end of the third season, Walker departed the series and was replaced by Jamie Luner as prosecutor-turned-profiler Dr. Rachel Burke during the show's final season. Robert Davi, Roma Maffia, Peter Frechette, and Julian McMahon co-starred for all four seasons. Caitlin Wachs and Erica Gimpel also co-starred for the first two seasons; Wachs was replaced by Evan Rachel Wood in a recurring role for the third season, while Gimpel appeared as a guest star.

Along with The Pretender, Profiler was a staple of NBC's Saturday night lineup during the late 1990s. The series shared a similar lead character and premise with the Fox series Millennium, which also premiered at the beginning of the 1996–97 television season.

== Plot ==
=== Seasons 1–3 ===
Dr. Samantha "Sam" Waters (Ally Walker) is a forensic psychologist working for the FBI's (fictitious) Violent Crimes Task Force ("VCTF"), based in Atlanta, Georgia. She is a criminal profiler with her own unique gift to "see" through the eyes of others. This gift gives Sam an added special insight into the workings of the criminal mind.

Sam performs all of her duties diligently and competently, her drive coming from experiencing both a professional and personal tragedy years earlier in which her husband was murdered by a serial killer known only as "Jack of All Trades." Due to Jack's dangerous and pathological nature, Sam must live under 24/7 police guard in a former firefighter station with her seven-year-old daughter Chloe (Caitlin Wachs, later Evan Rachel Wood); and her best friend, artist Angel Brown (Erica Gimpel).

After helping her mentor Bailey Malone (Robert Davi) on a difficult case, Sam comes out of retirement and reclusiveness to join the FBI Violent Crimes Task Force. Also on the team are detectives John Grant (Julian McMahon) and Nathan Brubaker (Michael Whaley), computer hacker George Fraley (Peter Frechette), forensic pathologist Grace Álvarez (Roma Maffia).

In season two, Brubaker leaves the VCTF and is replaced by Marcus Payton (Shiek Mahmoud-Bey), who creates tension on the team due to his skepticism of Sam's methods. Jack also recruits violent ex-felon Sharon Lesher (Traci Lords) to become his partner-in-crime "Jill of All Trades." Bailey is also faced with the rebellious behavior of his daughter Frances (Heather McComb) after she becomes involved in criminal activity.

In season three, all three of the new characters were dropped while Chloe was downgraded to a recurring character. With "Jack" seemingly being captured as a childhood schoolmate of Sam named Donald Lucas (Mark Rolston), the series began to focus more on VCTF cases and Sam's attempts to reintegrate back into society. Sam and Chloe move into an upscale house in the Atlanta suburbs, while Sam also begins to reconnect with her estranged father Walter Anderson (Lawrence Pressman) and pursue a relationship with prosecutor Paul Sterling (John Mese). Bailey also reconciles with his ex-wife Janet (Patricia Healy).

=== Season 4 ===
It is discovered at the end of season three that Lucas is not the real "Jack"; he was instead framed by violent sociopath Albert Newquay (Dennis Christopher). To mislead and tease the viewers, Albert Newquay, the real Jack's true name, was first mentioned in season two when he took refuge at the Maryland home of his wealthy mother Miriam (Louise Fletcher) to recover after being shot by Sam. Newquay then appeared on-camera for the first time in season three posing in disguise as Ed Post, the seemingly buffoonish sheriff of a sinister fictional small northern California town.

At the start of season four, Sam is kidnapped by Newquay. Bailey calls in for assistance from profiler Rachel Burke (Jamie Luner), a former FBI instructor at Quantico who also had Waters' skill of profiling. After being freed, Sam departs VCTF and Burke joins the team.

Burke initially alienates the team members due to her brusque take-charge manner that is unlike Sam. She and John Grant, who had met her previously, in particular clash due to a disagreement on whether they had actually engaged in intercourse during a liquor-filled nightcap. Rachel struggles to help her self-destructive younger brother Danny (Raphael Sbarge); Grace faces dealing with her second pregnancy after her husband leaves her; and George develops an addiction to painkillers after being injured in a minor car accident.

Rachel soon receives a stalker of her own with the shadowy urban legend named Damian Kennasas. Unstable FBI agent Joel Marks (Gregory Itzin) is initially presented as the main suspect, but however, the season ends with a cliffhanger as Rachel is framed for Joel's murder by the real Damian. The VCTF also faces disbandment from U.S. Congress over its high budget but this resulted in these cliffhangers never being answered after the show was cancelled.

== Episodes ==
Season	Episodes	Originally released	
Season	Episodes	First released	Last released
1	22	September 21, 1996	May 10, 1997
2	20	November 1, 1997	May 9, 1998
3	21	October 17, 1998	June 5, 1999
4	20	September 25, 1999	July 1, 2000

== Cast ==
Actor	Character	Seasons			
Actor	Character	1	2	3	4
Ally Walker	Dr. Samantha "Sam" Waters	Main	Main	Main	Guest
Robert Davi	Agent Bailey Malone	Main	Main	Main	Main
Julian McMahon	Agent John Grant	Main	Main	Main	Main
Roma Maffia	Dr. Grace Alvarez	Main	Main	Main	Main
Michael Whaley	Agent Nathan Brubaker	Main			
Peter Frechette	George Fraley	Main	Main	Main	Main
Erica Gimpel	Angel Brown	Main	Main	Guest	Guest
Caitlin Wachs	Chloe Waters (Note: Wood replaced Wachs as Chloe after season 2. However, she was credited in a recurring role instead of a main role.)	Main	Main		
Evan Rachel Wood	Chloe Waters			Recurring	Guest
Heather McComb	Frances Malone	Recurring	Main		
Shiek Mahmud-Bey	Agent Marcus Payton		Main		
Traci Lords	Sharon Lesher		Main		
Jamie Luner	Agent Rachel Burke				Main

=== Recurring ===
- A Martinez as Nick Cooper (seasons 1–2), an ATF bomb disposal expert and love interest of Sam Waters. He was murdered by "Jack" out of jealousy at the beginning of season two. Martinez and Walker had previously worked together on the NBC daytime serial Santa Barbara.
- Evan Rachel Wood as Chloe Waters (seasons 3–4)
- Mark Rolston as Donald Lucas (season 3), a childhood schoolmate of Sam who is believed to be "Jack." However, it is proven he was framed by the real "Jack"
- John Mese as Paul Sterling (season 3), a prosecutor whom Sam begins dating.
- Lawrence Pressman as Walter Anderson (season 3), Sam's estranged father who has a mysterious connection to Donald Lucas.
- Patricia Healy as Janet Bailey (season 3), Bailey's ex-wife with whom he tries to reconcile. The reconciliation is ultimately unsuccessful, and she is not seen again after the third season.
- Raphael Sbarge as Danny Burke (season 4), Rachel's younger brother. A self-destructive drug addict, he dies from an overdose towards the end of season four.
- Gregory Itzin as Joel Marks (season 4), an unstable FBI agent who stalked Rachel after she taped him threatening her and derailed his career. He is murdered at the end of season four, with Rachel being framed for the crime as revenge for her brother's death.

=== Unconfirmed ===
- Dennis Christopher as "Jack of All Trades"/Albert Newquay (uncredited or credited as "Jack" during seasons 1–2)

== The Pretender universe ==
Profiler shared the same universe with The Pretender, with three crossover episodes, three with Michael T. Weiss guest-starring on Profiler, Ally Walker made a guest appearance on The Pretender in season 3, episode 19, and Jamie Luner making a guest appearance on The Pretender in season 4, episode 10.

== Broadcast ==
Profiler was first syndicated to Court TV in 2000 and it aired weeknights at 1:00 a.m. and 4:00 a.m. Eastern on NBC Universal's 24-hour crime and mystery-themed cable channel Sleuth (now Cloo) in 2007. From 2018 to 2022, reruns aired at 1:00 a.m. and 2:00 a.m. daily on the network channel Start TV.

In Europe, it aired on CNBC Europe, in Hungary on TV3 and TV2, in the Czech Republic on ČT1 and TV Prima, in Italy on Rai 2, Fox and Fox Crime, in Slovakia on Markíza, in Poland on Fox Life, in Bulgaria first on cable television with subtitles, then on BNT 1 with the first Bulgarian dubbing and later with a new dubbing on Diema 2 and on AXN Crime with subtitles, in Germany on VOX, in France on M6, Série Club, Téva, TF6 and NT1, in Belgium on La Un, in Switzerland on RTS 1, in Japan, in South Korea, in Ukraine on QTV and Antenna and in Russia on STS with voice-over.

== Home media ==
=== DVD release ===
A&E Home Video (under license by NBC Entertainment) has released the entire series on DVD in Region 1 in the United States of America, but this four-season release box set has been discontinued and is now out of print.

- Episode #1.4 "I'll Be Watching You" from Season 1 was not included in the set due to music right issues over the title song.

Title	Format	Ep #	Discs/Tapes	Region 1 (USA)	Special features	USA Distributor
Profiler (Season 1)	DVD	21	6	1 July 2003; 29 July 2003	Profiles of Evil: Inside the Criminal Mind episode of A&E's American Justice series Commentary by Ally Walker and Robert Davi on the pilot episode "Insight" Photo gallery Cast Biographies	A&E Home Video
Profiler (Season 2)	DVD	20	6	28 October 2003; 25 November 2003	Commentary with Investigative Criminal Profiler Pat Brown on episode "Victims of Victims" Cast Biographies	A&E Home Video
Profiler (Season 3)	DVD	22	6	30 March 2004; 27 April 2004	Commentary with Roma Maffia on the episode "Heads You Lose" Ally Walker's final season Cast Biographies	A&E Home Video
Profiler (Season 4)	DVD	20	5	28 September 2004; 26 October 2004	Interview with series consultant Howard Teten, Former FBI Unit Chief and Criminal Profiler Commentary with executive producer Clifton Campbell on the final episode "On Your Marks" Cast Biographies	A&E Home Video

=== Streaming ===
As of 2026, this show is not available to stream on Peacock, but is currently available on The Roku Channel in the United States. International rights to the show were handled by Metro-Goldwyn-Mayer.

In Romania, in a remastered widescreen version (which is to co-incide the day after this show's 30th anniversary), it is available to stream all but three seasons on the Amazon Prime Video service.

== Australian DVD release ==
Title	Format	Ep #	Discs/Tapes	Region 4 (Australia)	Special features	Australia Distributor
Profiler (Season 1 & 2)	DVD	42	12	22 May 2019	Bonus Episode – "I'll Be Watching You"	Via Vision Entertainment
Profiler (Season 3 & 4)	DVD	41	12	10 July 2019	None	Via Vision Entertainment
Profiler (The Complete Series)	DVD	83	23	16 November 2019	None	Via Vision Entertainment

== Ratings ==
Season		U.S. ratings	Network	Rank
1	1996–97	7.4 million	NBC	#82
2	1997–98	9.9 million	NBC	#86
3	1998–99	8.9 million	NBC	#89
4	1999-00	8.1 million	NBC	#86
