= Kim Moses =

American film producer

Kim Moses is a principal in Sander/Moses Productions where she has both developed and served as an executive producer on over 600 hours of prime-time television programming.

== Career ==
Kim Moses began her career in television at Ohlmeyer Productions where she developed reality-based programs, game shows, and rock & roll and sports programs, specializing in live broadcasts. She also worked on Capitol Hill on the U.S. House of Representatives Committee on Science and Technology.

Her earliest television producing credits include the reality series How'd They do That! on CBS, Comic Strip Live Primetime and My World On Video, the reality special The Extreme Edge, and the sports reality series Power Boat Racing With Don Johnson. She has also served as a producer on the MTV Video Music Awards I & II, the Emmy Awards, the CBS live music special Super Bowl Saturday Night, the live music special Walt Disney's 4th of July Spectacular and the music special Disney's Christmas on Ice.

Her other television executive producer credits are Ali, An American Hero, the Emmy Award-winning Stolen Babies, Chasing the Dragon and How to Marry a Billionaire. Additional feature film script writing credits include The Surgeon and Home of Champions.

She has also executive produced Profiler, for which she also co-wrote and directed episodes, as well as The Beast, New York News, Brimstone, and For the People.

Along with Ian Sander, Moses produced "Hollywood and Civil Rights: Destination Freedom," a live event for the Democratic National Committee during the 2000 Democratic National Convention in Los Angeles.

Moses was executive producer and director of the CBS drama Ghost Whisperer, and she co-authored the show's companion book, Ghost Whisperer: Spirit Guide. She also co-created and written the award-winning Ghost Whisperer: The Other Side web series. Along with Ian Sander, she developed and executive produced the special Psychic in Suburbia for the Style Network.

Moses served as executive producer on the legal drama series Reckless, a legal drama developed and produced by Sander/Moses Productions and premiered on June 29, 2014. The series was not renewed.

== Total Engagement Experience ==
Moses pioneered the Total Engagement Experience (TEE), which is a business and creative model for television that uses each show as a component of a broader multi-platform entertainment experience that includes the internet, publishing, music, mobile, DVDs, video games and more, establishing an infinity loop driving ratings and increasing revenue streams.

== Personal life ==
Moses is the widow of Ian Sander, and they have two children, Aaron and Declan.
