= Ian Sander =

American television actor, director and producer (1947–2016)

- Born: November 22, 1947; New York City, New York, U.S.
- Died: May 3, 2016 (aged 68); Malibu, California, U.S.
- Education: University of Southern California
- Occupation: Television producer
- Spouse: Kim Moses
- Children: 2

Ian Sander (November 22, 1947 – May 3, 2016) was an American television producer, whose works include Ghost Whisperer and Profiler. He was a principal in Sander/Moses Productions.

== Biography ==
Sander was born in New York City. He graduated with a B.S. from the University of Southern California and attended Loyola Law School.

Sander worked as an actor and then as a producer by forming Kaleidoscope Films with Laura Ziskin. Sander's early producer credits include the theatrical film noir thriller D.O.A. and the feature Everybody's All-American.

Sander was Executive Producer and Director of the CBS drama Ghost Whisperer, and he co-authored the show's companion book, Ghost Whisperer Spirit Guide. He also co-created the award-winning Ghost Whisperer: The Other Side webseries.

Sander's other television executive producer credits include Profiler, The Beast, New York News, and For the People, all of which he also directed, and Brimstone. Sander was a producer of the Emmy Award-winning series Equal Justice and the Emmy Award-winning two-hour series pilot I'll Fly Away.

While Sander was executive producer of I'll Fly Away, it was the recipient of many honors, including Emmy Awards, a Peabody Award, Humanities Awards, Golden Globe Awards, The American Television Awards, Writers Guild of America Awards, Producers Guild of America Award, Directors Guild of America Awards, NAACP Image Awards, the Television Critics Association Awards, and Anti-Defamation League Artistic Achievement Award. He was also named Television Producer of the Year by the Producers Guild of America.

His television movie executive producer credits include Ali, An American Hero, the Emmy Award-winning Stolen Babies, Kansas, Chasing the Dragon, which he directed, and I’ll Fly Away: Then and Now, which he also directed, and for which he garnered a nomination for Outstanding Directorial Achievement for a Dramatic Special by the Directors Guild of America.

Sander (along with his wife Kim Moses) produced Hollywood and Civil Rights: Destination Freedom, a live event for the Democratic National Committee during the 2000 Democratic National Convention in Los Angeles.

For ten years, Sander created and produced entertainment event programming for the Internet, including Confessions of a Desperate Housewife for ABC.com and Electronic Entertainment Expo Internet events for UGO.com.

Sander and Kim Moses developed and served as executive producers on the special Psychic in Suburbia for the Style Network.

In addition to producing and directing, Ian Sander wrote the feature scripts The Surgeon and Home of Champions.

He was also a professor at the University of Southern California School of Cinematic Arts.

== Total Engagement Experience ==
Sander co-created (with Kim Moses) the "Total Engagement Experience," which is a way they described their promotional efforts for television series.

== Speaking engagements ==
Sander and Kim Moses participated in a panel on "Episodic TV: Elements of a Hit" at the Produced By Conference in 2009. Sander spoke at the National Association of Broadcasters in 2010 on the panel "Unboxing Advertising and Entertainment: Building a Transmedia Experience".

== Personal life and death ==
Sander married Kim Moses in 1994, and they had two children, Aaron and Declan. He died after a heart attack in his home in Malibu, California on May 3, 2016, at the age of 68.

== Filmography ==
Year	Title	Role	Notes
1970	Beyond the Valley of the Dolls	Boy-in-Tub	
1974	The Swinging Cheerleaders	Ron	
1976	God's Gun	Red Clayton	
