= After (film series) =

Film series article

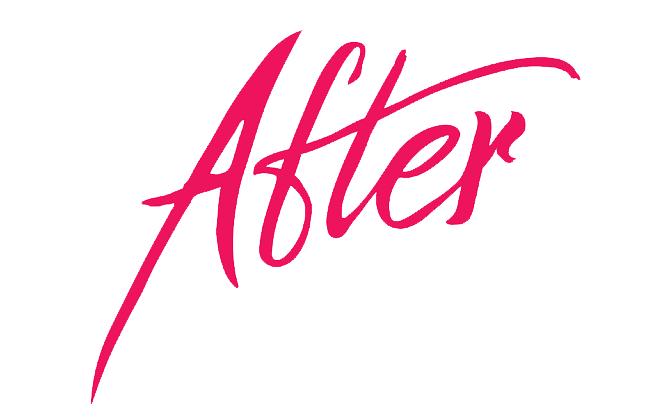
- Official film series logo
- Based on: After series by Anna Todd
- Starring: Josephine Langford; Hero Fiennes Tiffin
- Country: United States
- Language: English
- Budget: $42 million (3 films)
- Box office: $168.9 million (5 films)

The After film series consists of American romantic dramas based on the Anna Todd-authored After novels. The plot centers around the positive and negative experiences of a romantic relationship between a young couple named Tessa and Hardin. Over the events of their courtship, the pair overcome their various differences, all while strengthening their plans to build a future together.

Though the franchise has been met with negative reviews from critics, it has both attained a fanbase and fared well financially. The films' monetary successes have led the associated production studios to greenlight production on multiple installments at the same time.

The series will continue with another sequel and a prequel, both currently in development.

== Films ==
=== After (2019) ===
Tessa prides herself as an accomplished dedicated student and responsible daughter, and has always been a loyal girlfriend to her high school boyfriend. When she ventures away to college however, this is all called into question when she meets a brooding and mysterious guy named Hardin. Through an eventful series of romantic encounters, Tessa questions what she believed, her character, and what she wants in her future.

=== After We Collided (2020) ===
Following a passionate start to their relationship, Tessa and Hardin have experienced tumultuous differences, and an on-off series of courtships. Despite this the pair repeatedly return to each other, believing that their love has helped them to find a pathway to building a lasting relationship. Though Hardin can be mean, Tessa is drawn to him. Hardin struggles to work through his dark familial past, and in managing his anger issues. As his life experiences come to light, Tessa questions their future together. When she crashes her car following an argument, Hardin begins to believe he will only bring her harm.

=== After We Fell (2021) ===
When Tessa's alcoholic absent-father re-enters her life, she and Hardin try to develop a relationship with him. As Tessa plans to move away for a job opportunity, the pair's relationship once again grows strained. As they drift apart they begin to explore romantic interests in other people, all while becoming jealous of each other's potential suitors. Though they consider other options, they eventually reconcile. As they decide to get back together, revelations of Hardin's true family lead the couple on a new adventure.

=== After Ever Happy (2022) ===
Though they have had a variety of difficulties throughout their relationship, Tessa and Hardin find their love has only grown stronger. When they discover that they both have secrets regarding their respective families and upbringings, they realize that they're not so different as they had initially thought. Their time together has balanced each of their strengths and weaknesses; Tessa is no longer the simple good girl and Hardin has overcome his cruel rigid exterior. Despite this, they continue to work through their new differences, while determined to create a family together.

=== After Everything (2023) ===
Hardin is heartbroken that Tessa wants to move on and not be with Hardin while Hardin wants to be with her, Tessa tells Hardin to move on. Hardin goes to Lisbon, Portugal to make Natalie forgive him for everything he did to her, when he comes face to face with Natalie, Natalie wants him gone. Hardin comes across Sebastian (Natalie's friend) and hates Hardin and says to him "if it was up to me you would rot in jail" and later on Hardin ends up in jail because he keeps fighting Sebastian. Whether Hardin and Tessa will be together after these situations remains a mystery.

=== Future ===
In April 2021, it was announced that two additional installments were in development, a prequel and a sequel scheduled to film back-to-back in fall 2021. The films were confirmed to be written and directed by Castille Landon. In June of the same year, the filmmaker stated that she would continue work on the film series after first completing principal photography on an original script centered around a MMA love story.

==== Before ====
In 2021, Landon revealed information about a prequel, Before, based on the novella of the same name, which revolves around Hardin before he met Tessa. The project will detail a "larger conversation", with a more expanded plot including the character's trauma and family life. As the film will portray the character at a younger age, Fiennes Tiffin will not reprise the role.

==== Untitled sequel ====
Inspired by the details of the epilogue from After Ever Happy, the plot will center around the next-generation of the Scott family. The primary characters of the film will be Emery and Auden Scott, and their cousin Addy. Hardin and Tessa will feature into the plot, though as supporting characters as the parents of Emery and Auden; while Tiffin and Langford will not reprise the respective roles. Writer/director Landon stated the film will explore "carry[ing] the sins of [the] parents...trying to break out of that." Though the story will have less source material than the previous adaptations the filmmaker stated that it will "stay truthful" to past installments.

Film	U.S. release date	Director	Screenwriter(s)	Producers
After	April 12, 2019	Jenny Gage	Jenny Gage, Tom Betterton, Susan McMartin & Tamara Chestna	Anna Todd, Aron Levitz, Mark Canton, Jennifer Gibgot, Meadow Williams & Courtney Solomon
After We Collided	October 23, 2020	Roger Kumble	Anna Todd & Mario Celaya	Anna Todd, Brian Pitt, Aron Levitz, Mark Canton, Jennifer Gibgot, Nicolas Chartier & Courtney Solomon
After We Fell	September 30, 2021	Castille Landon	Sharon Soboil	Brian Pitt, Aron Levitz, Mark Canton, Jennifer Gibgot, Nicolas Chartier, Courtney Solomon, Jonathan Deckter & Hero Fiennes Tiffin
After Ever Happy	September 7, 2022	Castille Landon	Sharon Soboil	Brian Pitt, Aron Levitz, Mark Canton, Jennifer Gibgot, Nicolas Chartier, Courtney Solomon, Jonathan Deckter & Hero Fiennes Tiffin
After Everything	September 13, 2023	Castille Landon	Castille Landon	Brian Pitt, Aron Levitz, Mark Canton, Castille Landon, Jennifer Gibgot, Nicolas Chartier, Courtney Solomon & Hero Fiennes Tiffin

== Main cast and characters ==
List indicator

This section includes characters who will appear or have appeared in the franchise in main roles.

- An empty grey cell indicates the character was not in the film, or that the character's official presence has not yet been confirmed.

Character	Films				
Character	After	After We Collided	After We Fell	After Ever Happy	After Everything
Character	2019	2020	2021	2022	2023
Main cast
Tessa Young	Josephine Langford	Josephine Langford	Josephine Langford Samantha Fries^{Y}	Josephine Langford	Josephine Langford
Hardin Scott	Hero Fiennes Tiffin	Hero Fiennes Tiffin John Jackson Hunter^{Y}	Hero Fiennes Tiffin	Hero Fiennes Tiffin Franklyn Kendrick^{Y}	Hero Fiennes Tiffin
Carol Young	Selma Blair	Selma Blair	Mira Sorvino	Mira Sorvino	Mentioned
Landon Gibson	Shane Paul McGhie	Shane Paul McGhie	Chance Perdomo	Chance Perdomo	Chance Perdomo
Karen Scott	Jennifer Beals	Karimah Westbrook	Frances Turner	Frances Turner	Mentioned
Ken Scott	Peter Gallagher	Rob Estes	Rob Estes	Rob Estes	Rob Estes
Supporting cast
Molly Samuels	Inanna Sarkis	Inanna Sarkis			
Tristan	Pia Mia	Pia Mia			
Steph Jones	Khadijha Red Thunder	Khadijha Red Thunder			
Zed Evans	Samuel Larsen	Samuel Larsen			
Noah Porter	Dylan Arnold	Dylan Arnold			
Trevor Matthews		Dylan Sprouse			
Trish Daniels		Louise Lombard	Louise Lombard	Louise Lombard	Louise Lombard
Christian Vance		Charlie Weber	Stephen Moyer	Stephen Moyer	Stephen Moyer
Kimberly		Candice King	Arielle Kebbel	Arielle Kebbel	Arielle Kebbel
Richard Young		Stefan Rollins	Atanas Srebrev	Atanas Srebrev	
Robert Freeman			Carter Jenkins	Carter Jenkins	Carter Jenkins
Nora			Kiana Madeira	Kiana Madeira	Kiana Madeira
Smith Vance		Max Ragone	Anton Kottas	Anton Kottas	Anton Kottas
Emery Young					Aya Ivanova
Nathalie					Mimi Keene
Sebastian					Benjamin Mascolo
Naomi					Ella Martine
Maddy					Jessica Webber

== Additional crew and production details ==
Film	Crew/Detail					
Film	Composer	Cinematographer(s)	Editor	Production companies	Distributing companies	Running time
After	Justin Burnett	Adam Silver, Tom Betterton	Michelle Harrison	Voltage Pictures, Offspring Entertainment, CalMaple Media, Diamond Film Productions, Frayed Pages Entertainment, Wattpad Entertainment	Aviron Pictures	106 minutes
After We Collided	Justin Burnett	Larry Reibman	Anita Brandt-Burgoyne	Voltage Pictures, Offspring Entertainment, CalMaple Media, Frayed Pages Entertainment, Wattpad Entertainment	Open Road Films	105 minutes
After We Fell	George Kallis	Rob C. Givens, Joshua Reis	Morgan Halsey	Voltage Pictures, Vertical Entertainment, CalMaple Media, Ethea Entertainment, Wattpad Entertainment	Voltage Pictures	99 minutes
After Ever Happy	George Kallis	Rob C. Givens, Joshua Reis	Morgan Halsey	Voltage Pictures, CalMaple Media, Wattpad Studios	Voltage Pictures	95 minutes
After Everything	George Kallis	Joshua Reis	Joshua Kirchmer	Voltage Pictures, Wattpad Studios	Voltage Pictures	93 minutes

== Reception ==
=== Box office performance ===
Film	Box office gross			All-time ranking		Budget	Ref.
Film	U.S. and Canada	Other territories	Worldwide	U.S. and Canada	Worldwide	Budget	Ref.
After	$12,138,565	$57,359,022	$69,497,587	#4,820	#1,984	$14,000,000	
After We Collided	$2,386,483	$45,603,931	$47,990,414	#7,457	#2,142	$14,000,000	
After We Fell	$2,170,750	$19,398,396	$21,569,146	#7,587	#3,539	$14,000,000	
After Ever Happy	$1,072,750	$18,165,323	$19,238,073	#8,717	#4,469	—N/a	
After Everything	—	$10,628,992	$10,628,992			—	
Totals	$17,768,548	$151,155,664	$168,924,212	#7,145	#3,034	>$42,000,000	

=== Critical response ===
Film	Rotten Tomatoes	Metacritic
After	18% (39 reviews)	30 (8 reviews)
After We Collided	12% (17 reviews)	14 (4 reviews)
After We Fell	8% (12 reviews)	—N/a
After Ever Happy	0% (8 reviews)	—N/a
After Everything	(4 reviews)	—N/a
