= After (2019 film) =

- Theatrical release poster
- Directed by: Jenny Gage
- Screenplay by: Susan McMartin; Tamara Chestna; Jenny Gage; Tom Betterton
- Based on: After by Anna Todd
- Produced by: Jennifer Gibgot; Courtney Solomon; Mark Canton; Vassal Benford; Aron Levitz; Anna Todd; Meadow Williams; Dennis Pelino
- Starring: Josephine Langford; Hero Fiennes Tiffin; Selma Blair; Inanna Sarkis; Shane Paul McGhie; Pia Mia; Khadijha Red Thunder; Dylan Arnold; Samuel Larsen; Jennifer Beals; Peter Gallagher
- Cinematography: Adam Silver; Tom Betterton
- Edited by: Michelle Harrison
- Music by: Justin Burnett
- Production companies: Voltage Pictures; CalMaple Media; Diamond Film Productions; The Benford Company; Offspring Entertainment; Wattpad Studios; Frayed Pages Entertainment
- Distributed by: Aviron Pictures
- Release dates: April 8, 2019 (The Grove); April 12, 2019 (United States)
- Running time: 106 minutes
- Country: United States
- Language: English
- Budget: $14 million
- Box office: $69.5 million

After is a 2019 American romantic drama film directed by Jenny Gage, who co-wrote the screenplay with Susan McMartin, Tamara Chestna, and Tom Betterton, based on the 2014 novel of the same name by Anna Todd. It is the first installment in the After film series. The film stars Hero Fiennes Tiffin and Josephine Langford and follows a young woman who begins to romance a mysterious student during her first months of college. The cast includes Selma Blair, Inanna Sarkis, Shane Paul McGhie, Pia Mia, Khadijha Red Thunder, Dylan Arnold, Samuel Larsen, Jennifer Beals and Peter Gallagher in supporting roles.

After premiered at The Grove in Los Angeles on April 8, 2019, and was released in the United States on April 12, by Aviron Pictures. Despite negative reviews from critics, who criticized its screenplay and narrative glamorizing abusive relationships, it was a commercial success, grossing over $69 million worldwide against its $14 million budget.

A sequel, After We Collided, was released in 2020.

== Plot ==
Tessa Young begins her first year of college by moving into her dorm room with the help of her mother, Carol, and her boyfriend, Noah. During this process she meets her new roommate Steph and her girlfriend Tristan. The day after, Tessa shares a brief encounter with Steph's friend, Hardin Scott.

The following day Steph persuades Tessa to attend a party where she meets her other friends: Zed, Molly, and Jace, and meets Hardin for the second time. The group play truth or dare, which reveals Tessa's virginity; she is dared to kiss Hardin but refuses. Later on at the party he attempts to kiss Tessa, but she rejects his advances and leaves.

The following day Tessa meets with Landon, a classmate she met on her first day of classes. He reveals to her that he and Hardin are soon to become stepbrothers, with his mother engaged to Hardin's father. Following a class debate Hardin again approaches Tessa and insists they start over, inviting her to a nearby lake.

While they swim, Hardin kisses Tessa, saying that they cannot remain only friends. Later, they encounter Molly and Zed at a diner, following which Tessa promises to tell her boyfriend about the kiss she shared with Hardin. He tells her not to do so, saying that he does not date, disappointing her.

Noah surprises Tessa with a visit, and they experience an evening together around a bonfire. In a game of 'suck and blow' at the bonfire party, Jace purposely fails in order to kiss Tessa, making Hardin jealous and leading to a physical confrontation. While Noah sleeps in Tessa's bed after the party, she responds to Landon's call to check in on Hardin, who has destroyed the house in a drunken rage. She comforts him and they kiss, staying by his side to help him sleep.

The next day Tessa returns to her dorm to check on Noah. He realises she stayed overnight with Hardin, so leaves, heartbroken. Tessa and Hardin finally decide to date, but her mother threatens to cut her off financially if she continues the relationship, believing him to be a bad influence.

Hardin finds an apartment for them to live together in and they attend his father's wedding reception. He reveals that his father was a drunk and his mother was assaulted by some men his father provoked while intoxicated. Tessa comforts him, and they head back to their apartment where she loses her virginity to him.

Later, Tessa grows concerned about text messages sent to Hardin by Molly; she attempts to confront him, but he dismisses her and leaves. Leaving the apartment to search for him, Tessa finds him at a diner with Molly, Zed, Steph, and Jace. Molly cruelly shows Tessa a video from the first party they attended, revealing that he pursued her as a challenge and intended to make her fall in love with him before breaking her heart. Hardin attempts to convince her that his intentions changed as he got to know her, but she ends their relationship.

A heartbroken Tessa returns home to reconcile with her mother and Noah, who both forgive her. In the weeks that follow, she cuts ties with Steph and her group of friends, eventually interviewing for an internship at Vance Publishing. Before Tessa leaves college at the end of the semester, her lecturer hands her an essay written by Hardin, in which he confesses his love for her; after reading it, she returns to the lake to meet him.

== Cast ==
- Josephine Langford as Tessa Young
- Hero Fiennes Tiffin as Hardin Scott
- Selma Blair as Carol Young
- Inanna Sarkis as Molly
- Shane Paul McGhie as Landon
- Khadijha Red Thunder as Steph
- Swen Temmel as Jace
- Pia Mia as Tristan
- Dylan Arnold as Noah
- Samuel Larsen as Zed
- Jennifer Beals as Karen
- Peter Gallagher as Chancellor Ken Scott
- Naomi Yvonne Watson as TV Watcher

== Production ==
=== Development ===
In 2013, author Anna Todd posted the first chapters of a fanfiction titled After on fanfiction- and fiction-publishing website Wattpad. The fanfiction's original storyline was based on the boyband One Direction, and featured the band's members Harry Styles, Liam Payne, Niall Horan, Louis Tomlinson and Zayn Malik, portrayed as students at Washington State University. The story followed Tessa Young, an "innocent good girl" who becomes involved in a relationship with "bad boy" Styles.

Within a month of publishing the first chapters, the story had acquired 544 million reads; Todd later landed a deal with Simon & Schuster to publish novelizations of the series, with the lead male character's name changed to Hardin Scott; the novels were subsequently released in 2014. The books gained media attention and became New York Times bestsellers.

In 2014, Paramount Pictures acquired the rights to adapt After for film; before the expiry of the company's rights to the film production in mid-2017, the project was headed by screenwriter Susan McMartin. Following this, CalMaple Media and Offspring Entertainment acquired the filming rights, with writer Tamara Chestna hired to rework McMartin's script, and director Jenny Gage overseeing the script's final revisions. McMartin, Chestna, and Gage all received final script credit. CalMaple Media's Mark Canton and Courtney Solomon, Offspring Entertainment's Jennifer Gibgot, Wattpad's Aron Levitz, Meadow Williams of Diamond Film Productions and Dennis Pelino were all credited as producers on the film, alongside Todd herself. The film was financed by CalMaple, Voltage Pictures and Diamond Film Productions, with executive production by Swen Temmel, Nicolas Charier, Jonathan Deckter, David Dinerstein, Jason Resnick, Scott Karol, Ian Brereton, Eric Lehrman, Adam Shankman, Brian Pitt and Vassal Benford. Aviron Pictures distributed the film domestically, with Voltage Pictures handling foreign distribution.

=== Casting ===
On May 8, 2018, Julia Goldani Telles and Hero Fiennes Tiffin were cast in the main roles of Tessa Young and Hardin Scott respectively. The actors were selected by the production team, including Todd herself, who was present at the castings and contributed to the casting decisions.

In July 2018, Telles announced her exit from the film due to scheduling conflicts. In the same month, Josephine Langford was announced to play Tessa Young. Todd would later state that once she saw Langford, she "knew right away that was Tessa." Pia Mia was cast in the role of Tristan, a previously male character in the books. Executive producer Swen Temmel was cast as Jace, Shane Paul McGhie and Khadijha Red Thunder were added as Landon Gibson and Steph Jones respectively, Samuel Larsen was set as Zed Evans, and Inanna Sarkis played Molly Samuels. Producer Meadow Williams was additionally cast as Professor Soto, another previously male character in the books. On July 27, Peter Gallagher and Jennifer Beals were announced to play Ken Scott and Karen Gibson, Hardin's father and Landon's mother, respectively, with Selma Blair announced for Carol Young, Tessa's mother, and Dylan Arnold announced for Noah Porter on July 30.

=== Filming ===
Principal photography was due to begin in June 2018 in Boston, Massachusetts. In early July, producer Jennifer Gibgot stated that shooting would begin on July 16, 2018, in Atlanta, Georgia shortly after Langford had been cast as Tessa. Principal photography was mainly conducted at Emory University, and production was completed on August 24 of the same year.

== Release ==
After premiered at The Grove in Los Angeles on April 8, 2019, and was released in the United States on April 12, 2019, by Aviron Pictures. The film was released in Latin America on April 10, 2019, by Diamond Films, ahead of its North American release.

=== Box office ===
After grossed $12.1 million in the United States and Canada and $57.6 million in other territories for a worldwide total of $69.7 million against a production budget of $14 million.

In the United States and Canada, the film was released alongside Hellboy, Little and Missing Link, and was projected to gross $3–12 million from 2,138 theaters in its opening weekend. The film earned $2.9 million on its first day, including $550,000 from Thursday night previews. It went on to debut to $6 million, finishing eighth at the box office. In its second weekend, the film dropped 58% to $2.5 million, finishing 11th.

=== Critical response ===
On Rotten Tomatoes, the film holds an approval rating of 18% based on 39 reviews, with an average rating of 3.6/10. The site's critical consensus reads, "Tepid and tired, After's fun flourishes are let down by its generic story." The film has a weighted average of 30 out of 100 on Metacritic, based on eight critics, indicating "generally unfavorable" reviews. Audiences polled by CinemaScore gave the film an average grade of "B" on an A+ to F scale, while those at PostTrak gave it 2.5 out of 5 stars.

Critics found the screenplay at fault, with Owen Gleiberman of Variety writing that After was an "innocuous teen pulp soap opera that flirts with 'danger' but, in fact, keeps surprising you with how mild and safe and predictable it turns out to be." John Fink of The Film Stage echoed this sentiment, commenting that "the talented cast is burdened by a dead on arrival screenplay that waters down what could have been an intoxicating tale of first love," though he noted the film was "beautifully shot" and "occasionally aesthetically pleasing."

=== Accolades ===
After won the 2019 Teen Choice Award in the category Choice Drama Movie and the 2019 E! People's Choice Award in the category The Drama Movie of 2019.

== Sequels ==
In May 2019, a sequel was announced, with both Langford and Fiennes Tiffin returning to their respective roles. After We Collided released September 2, 2020, with costars Dylan Sprouse, Charlie Weber, Rob Estes, Louise Lombard, Candice King, Karimah Westbrook and Max Ragone.

A second sequel, After We Fell, released September 1, 2021.

A third sequel, After Ever Happy, has been completed and was released on September 7, 2022. Another sequel and prequel were in development, but in 2023, Voltage Pictures announced that After Everything is fifth and final chapter of franchise.

On September 13, 2023, the fourth sequel titled After Everything was released with Langford and Fiennes Tiffin both reprising their roles. The fifth and final installment in the After film series, it was the only film to not be based on a book in the series.
