= After We Collided (novel) =

Novel by Anna Todd

- Cover of the original 2014 release
- Author: Anna Todd
- Audio read by: Elizabeth Louise; Shane East
- Language: English
- Series: After
- Genre: Romance, contemporary
- Publisher: Gallery Books
- Publication date: November 25, 2014
- Publication place: United States
- Media type: Print (paperback); Ebook; Audiobook
- Pages: 688
- ISBN: 9781476792491
- Preceded by: After
- Followed by: After We Fell

After We Collided is a 2014 young adult American romance novel written by Anna Todd under her Wattpad name Imaginator1D and published by Gallery Books, an imprint of Simon & Schuster. After We Collided is the second installment of the After novel series.

A film adaptation of the same name was released on October 23, 2020.

== Background ==
Like its predecessor, After We Collided was originally released as fanfiction on Wattpad as the sequel to After, which was titled as After 2.

== Plot ==
After Tessa found out that Hardin played with her feelings, she leaves him and focuses on school and her life. She restored her relationship with her mother Carol and ex-boyfriend Noah. She even gets a job at VP (Vance Publishing in the first book). Life started being good for Tessa and her new colleague Trevor falls in love with her.

Hardin, on the other hand, is furious and sad at his friends, especially Molly, because she destroyed his first-ever relationship with a girl who liked him. He is determined to change himself. He fixes his relationship with his father Ken and accepted Landon as brother and friend.

A few days later Tessa, Trevor, Kimberly, and Vance go to Seattle to celebrate book publishing at a club. Tessa gets drunk and started dancing, accidentally kissing a stranger because she imagined him to be Hardin. She later drunk calls him about it and he drives all the way to Seattle to see her.

Trevor shows up to Tessa's hotel room after they accidentally switched phones in the car ride back from the club. Shortly after Trevor walks into her hotel room, Hardin arrives banging on the door where he finds Tessa and Trevor. After Hardin tries to fight Trevor, Tessa tells Trevor to leave so she can calm Hardin down. Hardin asks her if she's slept with him and after she responds no he proceeds to ask her if she wanted to. Tessa plays on his feels for her in response and seduces Hardin to sleep with her. After trying to deny her, he and Tessa make love. He tells her he loves her repeatedly and she drunkenly shushes him until she falls asleep.

The next morning, Tessa and Hardin argue about the incident the previous night. Hardin tries to get them to talk about the state of their relationship when Tessa says there is no relationship with them anymore and calls the previous night a mistake. She tries to say that Hardin should've never came and should've told her "no" which Hardin responds by repeating all things she way saying to him the night before. Embarrassed, Tessa tells Hardin to get out of her hotel room. Before he storms out, Hardin lies and says that he was sleeping with Molly while she kissed the stranger in the club.

At work, Tessa is talking to Trevor, and he asks her if she loves Hardin. Tessa tells him, yes but they are apart because of personal issues.

Three months after her work at VP Tessa pays a visit to her mother. Tessa tells her that she temporarily broke up with Hardin because he started having anger issues. Carol is delighted about the news, but Tessa said that she will not have any boyfriend from now on. Carol agrees and before Tessa leaves, she says to her mother that she loves her.

While driving to work one day, Tessa gets a text message from Hardin that causes her to get into a minor car accident. Hardin sitting passenger while on the drive back from sleeping over a friend's house spots Tessa's wrecked car and jumps out the car immediately to find her. After he sees she's okay, Tessa sees the "friend", Carly, Hardin has been with all night and tells him how she knew he was a liar and that he should leave the hospital.

They visited tattoo parlor where Hardin got new tattoo. On their way home, they run into homeless man which is Tessa's dad Richard.

== Characters ==
- Tessa Lynn Young – an ambitious American 19-year-old girl, English Literature major, and intern at Vance Publishing. Has straight dirty blonde hair, blue-grey eyes, tan skin, and is Hardin's on-and-off girlfriend. Birthday: December 19, 1994.
- Hardin Allen Scott – a rebellious English 20-year-old boy, English Literature major at WSU. Has dark curly-hair, green eyes, tan skin, and is Tessa's on-and-off boyfriend. Described to have multiple facial piercings and full tattoo sleeves. Birthday: February 5, 1993.
- Trish Powell – Hardin's mother.
- Christian Vance – CEO of Vance Publishing, Tessa's boss, Kimberly's boyfriend.
- Kimberly – Receptionist at Vance Publishing, Christian Vance's assistant/girlfriend and Tessa's friend.
- Carol Young – Tessa's controlling mother.
- Noah Porter – Tessa's childhood best friend and ex-boyfriend.
- Trevor Mathews – Accountant at Vance Publishing.
- Ken Scott – Hardin's father and chancellor at Washington Central University.
- Karen Scott – Ken's new wife and Landon's mother.
- Landon Gibson – Tessa's best friend, Hardin's stepbrother, English Literature major at WCU.
- Zed Evans – Hardin's friend, Hardin's opponent in the "bet", Tessa's love interest. Student at WSU.
- Steph Jones – Edgy, red-haired girl, Hardin's friend and Tessa's ex-roommate, Tristan's girlfriend. Student at WSU.
- Molly Samuels – Pink-haired, Mean girl, ex-friend-with-benefits of Hardin. Student at WSU.

== Adaptations ==
=== Film ===
A film adaptation for After We Collided was announced in May 2019. Langford and Fiennes Tiffin reprised their respective roles as Tessa and Hardin, and the film was released on October 23, 2020.

=== Graphic novel ===
In July 2021, it was announced that the novel series will be adapted into graphic novels by artist Pablo Andrés.
