= After We Collided =

2020 film directed by Roger Kumble

- Theatrical release poster
- Directed by: Roger Kumble
- Screenplay by: Anna Todd; Mario Celaya
- Based on: After We Collided by Anna Todd
- Produced by: Jennifer Gibgot; Nicolas Chartier; Anna Todd; Aron Levitz; Vassal Benford; Courtney Solomon; Mark Canton; Brian Pitt
- Starring: Josephine Langford; Hero Fiennes Tiffin; Dylan Sprouse; Shane Paul McGhie; Candice King; Khadijha Red Thunder; Inanna Sarkis; Samuel Larsen; Selma Blair
- Cinematography: Larry Reibman
- Edited by: Anita Brandt-Burgoyne
- Music by: Justin Burnett
- Production companies: Voltage Pictures; Offspring Entertainment; Wattpad Studios; CalMaple Media; Frayed Pages Entertainment
- Distributed by: Open Road Films
- Release dates: September 2, 2020 (Europe); October 23, 2020 (United States)
- Running time: 105 minutes
- Country: United States
- Language: English
- Budget: $14 million
- Box office: $48 million

After We Collided is a 2020 American romantic drama film directed by Roger Kumble from a screenplay by Anna Todd and Mario Celaya, based on the 2014 novel of the same name by Todd. It is the sequel to After (2019) and the second installment in the After film series. The film stars Josephine Langford and Hero Fiennes Tiffin reprising their roles as Tessa Young and Hardin Scott, respectively, with Dylan Sprouse, Shane Paul McGhie, Candice King, Khadijha Red Thunder, Inanna Sarkis, Samuel Larsen, and Selma Blair in supporting roles.

After We Collided premiered in Europe on September 2, 2020, and was released simultaneously in theaters and video-on-demand in the United States on October 23, by Open Road Films. Like its predecessor, the film received negative reviews from critics, with many criticizing the screenplay and glamourized portrayal of toxic relationships. Despite this, it was a box-office success, grossing $48 million worldwide against a $14 million budget.

A sequel, After We Fell, was released in 2021.

== Plot ==
While reflecting upon his breakup with Tessa Young, Hardin Scott meets a homeless man, whom he rebuffs after the man tries to ask him a question. On her first day as an intern at Vance Publishing, Tessa shares an awkward encounter with coworker Trevor Matthews. Impressed with her work, Vance's owner Christian Vance takes Tessa, Trevor, and his secretary and girlfriend Kimberly to a Seattle-area work event.

At a nightclub, Tessa and Trevor network with and impress a businessman considering an investment in Vance. Tessa drunk-dials Hardin, compelling him to track her down. He arrives at her hotel room to find a half-dressed Trevor (whose clothes were drying after Tessa accidentally spilt wine on them). Hardin kicks him out of the room, and she fights with him before they have sex.

The next morning, Hardin and Tessa fight again before she and Trevor leave with Vance. He informs his interns that he has secured financing from the businessman. Tessa and Hardin each come to regret ending their relationship.

When Tessa returns to the apartment she shared with Hardin to retrieve some belongings, he steps in with his mother Trish, who believes they are still dating. Tessa plays along and finds that she enjoys spending time with both of them. Trish reveals to her the source of Hardin's issues: he was traumatized after watching her get violently raped by men to whom his father Ken owed money when he was a boy.

On the following day, her birthday, Tessa visits her mother Carol's and encounters her ex-boyfriend Noah. The two accidentally reveal that Tessa's long-lost father had come looking for her, but her mother had turned him away. Feeling betrayed, Tessa returns to Hardin's apartment and resumes their relationship.

On Christmas Day, Hardin, Tessa, and Trish attend a holiday party at Hardin's dad Ken's. Furious at Ken's apparent willingness to forgive himself for his past misdeeds, Hardin gets drunk and assaults him. Tessa recounts the incident to Trevor, who warns her that her relationship with Hardin will not end well. Vance contacts Tessa to inform her that his company is expanding and moving to Seattle, so offers her a job there.

On New Year's Eve, Tessa and Hardin attend a party hosted at a university frat house, where they reconnect with a number of their former college friends. Each misinterprets a conversation held by the other: Tessa assumes Hardin is cheating on her when she sees him asking for the forgiveness of another girl with whom he had previously been involved, and Hardin accidentally learns of Vance's offer and concludes that Tessa will leave him for Trevor.

The couple fight, and she storms off. Hardin only sees apologetic texts sent by Tessa the next day after charging his phone. He calls her, but she reaches for her phone while driving and is injured in a car accident.

Devastated by his indirect responsibility for the accident, Hardin decides to end his relationship with Tessa, but Trish talks him out of it. He races to Vance's farewell party, where Vance proposes to Kimberly. Tessa fights with Hardin once more before forgiving him. Later, the homeless man who spoke to Hardin earlier confronts them, revealing his identity: he is Tessa's father.

== Cast ==
- Josephine Langford as Tessa Young
- Hero Fiennes Tiffin as Hardin Scott
- Dylan Sprouse as Trevor
- Louise Lombard as Trish
- Shane Paul McGhie as Landon
- Candice King as Kimberly
- Charlie Weber as Christian Vance
- Khadijha Red Thunder as Steph
- Inanna Sarkis as Molly
- Pia Mia as Tristan
- Samuel Larsen as Zed
- Dylan Arnold as Noah
- Karimah Westbrook as Karen
- Rob Estes as Ken
- Selma Blair as Carol

Anna Todd, the writer of the source novel and co-writer of the film's screenplay, has a brief cameo as a club patron.

== Production ==
In May 2019, it was confirmed that a sequel to the film After was planned with Josephine Langford and Hero Fiennes Tiffin reprising their roles as Tessa Young and Hardin Scott respectively.

On August 4, it was announced that Roger Kumble would direct the sequel. On August 5, it was announced that Dylan Sprouse was cast as Trevor, Tessa's coworker. On August 15, Charlie Weber, Rob Estes, Louise Lombard, Candice King, Karimah Westbrook and Max Ragone were announced to play Christian Vance, Ken Scott, Trish, Kim, Karen, and Smith, respectively. Estes and Westbrook replaced Peter Gallagher and Jennifer Beals as Ken and Karen Scott respectively.

Principal photography began in August 2019 in Atlanta, Georgia.

== Release ==
After We Collided was theatrically released in Italy, Ireland, Portugal and the United Kingdom on September 2, 2020. On September 3, 2020, the film was released in Austria, Cyprus, Czech Republic, Germany, Greece, Hungary, Slovakia, Spain, Switzerland, and Ukraine. It was then released in Sweden on September 9, in Australia, Denmark, the Middle East and New Zealand on September 10, and in Canada, Estonia, Latvia, Lithuania, Norway, Poland, and Romania on September 11. It was released simultaneously to theaters and on-demand in the United States on October 23, 2020, by Open Road Films. In selected regions, it was released on Netflix on December 22, 2020.

== Reception ==
=== Box office and VOD ===
The film debuted to $10 million from 16 countries, with Italy ($2.6 million) being the largest market. In its second weekend, the film grossed $4.2 million from 21 countries, for a 10-day running total of $21 million. In Sweden, the film grossed $295,567 from 122 theaters during the first five days of its theatrical release, beginning on September 9. Following the strong sophomore numbers, it was announced the film would have an increase in the theater totals in several countries, including the United Kingdom where its gross jumped 18% in the second weekend and was being distributed by Shear Entertainment would increase from 59 theaters to 360. In its third weekend the film made $4.1 million from 31 countries. In its fourth weekend, the film earned $3.25 million from 32 countries. In Spain the film earned (€3.2 million) $3.7 million.

In After We Collided's domestic debut, it grossed $422,899 from 460 theaters. Over that same period, it was the number one most rented film on Google Play and Apple TV, and second at FandangoNow. The following weekend it remained first at Google and Apple, while finishing third at both Fandango and Spectrum.

=== Critical response ===
On Rotten Tomatoes, the film holds an approval rating of 12% based on 17 reviews, with an average rating of 3.9/10. On Metacritic, it has a weighted average score of 14 out of 100, based on four critics, indicating "overwhelming dislike."

== Sequels ==
In September 2020 it was announced that two sequels, After We Fell and After Ever Happy, were greenlit to go into back-to-back production, with Castille Landon directing both films. After We Fell was theatrically released on September 30, 2021. After Ever Happy was theatrically released on September 7, 2022.

On August 24, 2022, it was announced that another sequel, titled After Everything, has finished filming. Langford and Fiennes Tiffin are both set to reprise their roles. It will be the fifth and final movie in the After film series. It will also be the only film that will not be based on a book in the series.

Another sequel and prequel are in development.
