= After (Todd novel) =

2014 novel written by Anna Todd

- Cover of the original 2014 release
- Author: Anna Todd
- Audio read by: Elizabeth Louise
- Language: English
- Series: After
- Genre: Romance, contemporary
- Publisher: Gallery Books
- Publication date: October 21, 2014
- Publication place: United States
- Media type: Print (paperback); Ebook; Audiobook
- Pages: 592
- ISBN: 978-1-4767-9248-4
- Followed by: After We Collided

After is a 2014 young adult romance novel written by American author Anna Todd under her Wattpad name Imaginator1D and published by Gallery Books, an imprint of Simon & Schuster. After is the first installment of the After novel series.

A film adaptation of the same name was released on April 12, 2019.

== Background ==
After was originally released as a fanfiction on Wattpad. Anna Todd's writing of the novel was inspired by the music and fandom of One Direction. She took inspiration from singer Harry Styles and based the fanfiction on him.

== Plot ==
Tessa Young, an incoming freshman at Washington State University, arrives at college with her mother, Carol, and boyfriend Noah. The conservative Carol is horrified by Tessa's alternative-styled roommate and her friend, upperclassman Steph Jones. When Carol fails to convince Tessa to switch dorms, Carol warns her daughter about the dangers of college parties before leaving with Noah. The next morning, Tessa returns to her room to find one of Steph's friends inside, an attractive, tattooed boy who makes several rude comments to Tessa. Steph tells Tessa about the boy, Hardin Scott, who is a rebellious figure on campus.

On the first day of college classes, Tessa befriends Landon Gibson, who is also an English major. Tessa learns from Landon that Hardin is his future step-brother since Landon's mom and Hardin's dad are engaged. After the first week of college, Tessa reluctantly accompanies Steph to the party and plays "Truth or Dare" with Steph's friends, including Hardin, during which she admits she is a virgin. Hardin is dared to kiss Tessa, but she runs from the group, embarrassed. Hardin catches up to her and they share an intense moment that he takes as trivial. Carol disapproves of Tessa's activities and blames Hardin, so Tessa promises to ignore him. But Hardin falls for Tessa.

Hardin brings Tessa to a stream in the woods. When Tessa implies the two are now dating, Hardin says he doesn't date, leaving Tessa heartbroken. She subsequently ignores Hardin and invites Noah to stay the night with her. That night, Landon calls Tessa to help him control a drunken Hardin. After an argument with Hardin, they are intimate together again. The next morning, Tessa begs Noah for forgiveness for leaving him alone, and he says he'll think about it.

Tessa meets Ken Scott, Hardin's father and the chancellor of the college, and he invites her to dinner at his home. During the course of the evening, Hardin argues with Ken and storms out to the backyard, where Tessa consoles him. Tessa stays the night and witnesses Hardin's intense nightmares. The next morning, Hardin takes Tessa back to her room, only for Noah to be waiting for them. A fight almost breaks out between the two men, but Tessa tells Noah to leave. Landon warns Tessa to be careful with Hardin.

Ken uses his connections to get Tessa an internship at Vance's Publishing, asking in exchange for Tessa to convince Hardin to come to his wedding with Karen. Hardin, initially pleased with the news of Tessa's internship, becomes cold when he meets with his friends and abandons Tessa. Tessa later finds Hardin with Molly on his lap. Fuming, Tessa plays Truth or Dare with the group and kisses Zed to upset Hardin. Hardin, in turn, dares Molly to kiss him. When Tessa tries to run away, Hardin chases her and declares his love in front of everyone. Tessa rejects him and leaves. Hardin sullenly takes back his declaration, so Tessa goes on a date with Zed. They attend a party, and after Tessa returns to Zed's apartment, they kiss. However, this makes Tessa realize how strong her feelings are for Hardin. She returns to Hardin, and they confess their love for each other. Hardin finally agrees to attend his father's wedding.

They return to Tessa's dorm and find a furious Carol waiting for them. Carol demands Tessa stop seeing Hardin and go back to Noah or else be cut off.

Several of Hardin's friends flirt with Tessa, leading to Hardin becoming angry. Tessa agrees to move in with him to a shared apartment, but he doesn't come home on the second night together, upsetting Tessa. Carol finds out Tessa has been living with Hardin and slaps her before cutting her off.

On their way to Ken's wedding, Tessa spots Zed with terrible bruises he seemingly got from Hardin. Tessa confronts Hardin over his suspicious behavior, revealing their living situation to the group, leading him to finally admit the truth: after the game of Truth or Dare, Hardin and Zed bet on if he could take Tessa's virginity, which Hardin proved by showing the group the bloody sheets. Hardin says that over the course of fulfilling the bet, he falls in love with Tessa, and begs for her forgiveness. She flees and runs into Zed. She asks for all the details of the bet and leaves with him, leaving Hardin behind.

== Characters ==
- Theresa "Tessa" Young – An 18-year-old girl who starts her first year of college and falls in love with Hardin Scott.
- Hardin Scott – A rebellious, brooding British student to whom Tessa is drawn.
- Landon Gibson – Tessa's best friend and Hardin's step-brother.
- Ken Scott – who Hardin believes is his father but later finds out he is not and current chancellor at Washington State University.
- Karen Scott – Ken's new wife and Landon's mother.
- Carol Young – Tessa's mother who doesn't like Hardin Scott.
- Noah Porter – Tessa's high school boyfriend.
- Zed Evans – Hardin's friend from college who is interested in Tessa.
- Steph Jones – An edgy, red-headed girl and Tessa's roommate.
- Molly Samuels – A mean girl who has on-and-off relations with Hardin.
- Christian Vance - Hardin's father

== Reception ==
The book was criticized for glamorization of an abusive relationship, poor character arcs and Todd's lack of style and prose.

Kelly Faircloth of Jezebel said it was "sloppy fan fiction." She also compared its prose to that of Fifty Shades of Grey, writing, "If you complained about the prose of 50 Shades, After is going to send you in a conniption." Sara Dobie Bauer of Sheknows complained that the story was unoriginal and the dialogue was stilted. Bauer also compared the book to the Fifty Shades series, writing, "After is being called the innocent version of Fifty Shades, which makes me grind my teeth to nubs because Fifty Shades was atrocious enough. If it weren't for the sex scenes in Fifty Shades, the book would have been nothing but the constant nagging of an insecure idiot."

== Adaptations ==
=== Film ===
A film adaptation starring Josephine Langford as Tessa Young and Hero Fiennes Tiffin as Hardin Scott was released on April 12, 2019, by Aviron Pictures.

=== Graphic novel ===
In July 2021, it was announced that the novel series will be adapted into graphic novels by artist Pablo Andrés. After: The Graphic Novel was released on May 3, 2022.
