= After We Fell =

- Theatrical release poster
- Directed by: Castille Landon
- Screenplay by: Sharon Soboil
- Based on: After We Fell by Anna Todd
- Produced by: Jennifer Gibgot; Brian Pitt; Aron Levitz; Nicolas Chartier; Jonathan Deckter; Hero Fiennes Tiffin; Courtney Solomon; Mark Canton
- Starring: Josephine Langford; Hero Fiennes Tiffin; Louise Lombard; Rob Estes; Arielle Kebbel; Chance Perdomo; Frances Turner; Kiana Madeira; Carter Jenkins; Stephen Moyer; Mira Sorvino
- Cinematography: Rob C. Givens; Joshua Reis
- Edited by: Morgan Halsey
- Music by: George Kallis
- Production companies: Voltage Pictures; Wattpad Studios; Ethea Entertainment; CalMaple Media
- Distributed by: Voltage Pictures
- Release dates: September 1, 2021 (Europe); September 30, 2021 (United States)
- Running time: 98 minutes
- Country: United States
- Language: English
- Box office: $21.8 million

After We Fell is a 2021 American romantic drama film directed by Castille Landon from a screenplay by Sharon Soboil, based on the 2014 novel of the same name by Anna Todd. The film is a sequel to After We Collided (2020) and the third installment in the After film series. It stars Josephine Langford and Hero Fiennes Tiffin reprising their roles as Tessa Young and Hardin Scott, respectively. Louise Lombard, Rob Estes, Arielle Kebbel, Chance Perdomo in his feature film debut, Frances Turner, Kiana Madeira, Carter Jenkins and Mira Sorvino appear in supporting roles.

The plot follows Tessa's preparations for a job in Seattle, the arrival of Tessa's father, and revelations about Hardin's family, all of which threaten the couple's relationship.

Shooting back-to-back took place in Bulgaria in 2020 with its sequel, After Ever Happy. Due to scheduling conflicts and travel restrictions during the COVID-19 pandemic, several characters were recast.

After We Fell was released in Europe on September 1, 2021, and in the United States on September 30, by Voltage Pictures. The film received criticism for its screenplay and acting. The sequel, After Ever Happy, was released in 2022.

== Plot ==
In a flashback, Carol Young kicks her husband Richard out of their house over his alcoholism, despite Tessa's pleas for him to stay. In the present, Tessa and her boyfriend Hardin Scott bring a now-homeless Richard to their apartment. Tessa wants to let her father stay so she can build a relationship with him, while Hardin distrusts Richard, even offering him money to leave. Richard declines the money, explaining that he only wants to make amends.

Tessa and Landon, Hardin's step-brother, discuss Tessa's move to Seattle to be closer to her employer Vance Publishing. Hardin arrives and argues with Tessa over the move; he hoped to move with her to London after graduation. After a phone call with his mother Trish, who asks Hardin to attend her upcoming wedding and talks about her close relationship with Vance's owner Christian Vance, Hardin accompanies Richard to a bar, where they get into a fight with a bystander over lewd comments about Tessa.

The next day, Richard decides to leave the apartment, while Hardin and Tessa fight again about her move to Seattle. Vance's fiancée Kimberley offers to let Tessa and Hardin stay with the couple in Seattle, after which Hardin apologizes to Tessa.

Tessa and Hardin accompany Hardin's dad Ken, his step-mom Karen, and Landon to the family's lake house for a weekend vacation. Hardin sheds some of his previous hostilities towards his family, growing closer to them. While the family is out for dinner, Hardin encounters his old friend Lillian, who he introduces to Tessa. She grows jealous of the attention Lillian receives from Hardin and begins to flirt with their waiter Robert.

After having sex in a hot tub, Hardin asks Tessa if she ever had feelings towards her coworker Trevor. When she admits she may have briefly, he storms away. When Hardin tells Tessa that he is with Lillian, Tessa goes to the restaurant from before and flirts with Robert, who gives her his phone number.

Hardin and Lillian arrive, and Lillian explains she is gay and thus has no interest in Hardin. When Hardin finds Robert's phone number in Tessa's belongings the next day, they leave the lake house early.

Following her move to Seattle, Tessa and Hardin do not speak for several days. He finds her journal, wherein she describes all the pain caused by their relationship. Eventually, they reconcile, and Hardin takes up boxing as a way of resolving his anger issues. Vance and Kimberly tell Tessa that they are expecting a child. When Hardin has a nightmare of Tessa being unfaithful to him, he surprises her in Seattle, admits to reading her journal, and apologizes for causing her pain.

After spending some time together, Hardin returns home, where he finds Richard in his apartment, brutally beaten. He had been attacked by men to whom he owed money, so Hardin gives him a watch to pay off the debt. When Tessa visits her gynecologist to start birth control, she is informed that, because of an issue with her cervix, she may never conceive. Hardin tells Tessa he plans on moving to Seattle in two months.

Hardin eventually agrees to attend his mother's wedding in London, taking Tessa along and showing her his hometown. The night before the wedding, Hardin catches Trish and Vance having sex, causing an altercation between the three. Trish and her fiancé get married the next day.

Tessa sits with Kimberley, who admits she knows of Vance's infidelity, but that she loves him and cannot stay angry with him. Hardin discusses the previous night's events with Vance at a local bar. Kimberley tells Tessa, and Vance tells Hardin, that Vance is Hardin's real father. The news shocks Tessa and infuriates Hardin, who storms out of the bar. Tessa finds Hardin and they embrace lovingly in the street.

== Cast ==
- Josephine Langford as Tessa Young
- Hero Fiennes Tiffin as Hardin Scott
- Louise Lombard as Trish
- Rob Estes as Ken
- Arielle Kebbel as Kimberley
- Chance Perdomo as Landon
- Frances Turner as Karen
- Kiana Madeira as Nora
- Carter Jenkins as Robert
- Stephen Moyer as Christian Vance
- Mira Sorvino as Carol

== Production ==
Filming for After We Fell and its sequel After Ever Happy began in Sofia, Bulgaria, in September 2020. It was later announced that the characters of Kimberley, Christian Vance, Carol Young, Landon Gibson and Karen Scott were recast because the original actors not being able to travel to Bulgaria due to the COVID-19 pandemic or that they were already committed to other projects.

Castille Landon directed the film using a script written by Sharon Soboil. The film was produced by Jennifer Gibgot, Brian Pitt, Wattpad's Aron Levitz, CalMaple's Mark Canton, and Courtney Solomon.

== Release ==
After We Fell was released in multiple European countries on September 1, 2021. The film performed well in Germany, Russia, Spain, the Netherlands, and Poland, grossing $9.2 million on its opening weekend at the worldwide box office. It debuted atop the Belgian box office and achieved 50% of the total box office that the prior film, After We Collided, received in its opening weekend.

The film was released on September 30, 2021, in the United States, with Voltage Pictures partnering with Fathom Events. In select regions, it was released directly to Netflix on October 21, 2021 and arrived on Netflix US on January 17, 2022. In United Kingdom, Italy and France, it was released directly to Amazon Prime on October 22, 2021.

== Reception ==
=== Box office ===
The film has grossed $2.2 million in the United States and Canada and $19.4 million in international territories, for a worldwide total of $21.6 million.

In Canada, the film earned $428,300 during its three-day opening weekend across 230 theaters, grossing $215,600 on its opening day. The film earned $9.2 million across 31 international territories during its three-day opening weekend, in which it opened at number one in Belgium and in second place in Germany, Spain, Russia, The Netherlands, Austria and Mexico.

=== Critical reception ===
The review aggregator website Rotten Tomatoes reported a 0% approval rating based on 11 reviews, with an average rating of 2.91/10.

Caroline Siede of The A.V. Club rated the film a 'D', describing it as a "filler episode" of the franchise, saying "the problem is that most of After We Fell is too boring to even lend itself to mockery". Cath Clarke of The Guardian panned the film, giving it 1 star out of 5, criticizing the acting as "daytime-soap standard. Jade Budowski of Decider urged viewers to skip the film, describing it as "a yawn-inducing continuation of After We Collided, picking up exactly where it left off and schlepping along at a pace so slow and uneventful I kept checking how many minutes were left". She criticized the film's plot and runtime, saying it "feels like an eternity, dragging its way through lackluster sex scenes set to B-list pop songs and very little actual conflict". Writing for Screen Rant, Molly Freeman expressed that while the film may please fans of After, "it doesn't provide the same level of entertainment as the previous movies" and described the plot as "where stuff happens, but it all feels meaningless - so much so that even the melodrama loses its fun". David Pardillos of Cinemanía gave the film 2 out of 5 stars, saying it is "reduced to the now classic series of outbursts of anger by Hero Fiennes-Tiffin" and "to the squared sex scenes arranged throughout its montage". Sabela Pillado of La Voz de Galicia was also critical, calling it a "hormonal mess with overtones of a chic soap opera" and likened it to an "unfinished chapter that you can only continue if you have seen (and will continue to watch) the other films". Sandra Hall of The Sydney Morning Herald awarded the film 2 stars out of 5, noting that "After We Fell is unlikely to interest fans of the popular Netflix series Sex Education, and its unfiltered treatment of the black comic aspects of teenage sexuality.

== Sequels ==
In October 2020, it was announced that After We Fell and After Ever Happy were greenlit to go into back-to-back production, with Castille Landon directing both films. After Ever Happy was released in September 2022. Filming began December 28, 2020 and concluded on February 16, 2022. The film was released on September 7, 2022.

On August 24, 2022, it was announced that final movie of franchise, titled After Everything, had finished filming. Langford and Fiennes Tiffin will reprise their roles. It will be the fifth movie in the After film series. It will also be the only film that will not be based on a book in the series.
