= The Silencing =

2020 American action-thriller film directed by Robin Pront

- Official release poster
- Directed by: Robin Pront
- Written by: Micah Ranum
- Produced by: Cybill Lui Eppich
- Starring: Nikolaj Coster-Waldau; Annabelle Wallis; Hero Fiennes Tiffin; Zahn McClarnon; Melanie Scrofano
- Cinematography: Manuel Dacosse
- Edited by: Alain Dessauvage
- Music by: Brooke Blair; Will Blair
- Production companies: Anova Pictures; XYZ Films
- Distributed by: Saban Films
- Release dates: July 16, 2020 (DirecTV Cinema); August 14, 2020 (United States)
- Running time: 93 minutes
- Countries: United States; Canada
- Language: English
- Box office: $170,653

The Silencing is a 2020 action-thriller film directed by Robin Pront from a screenplay by Micah Ranum. It stars Nikolaj Coster-Waldau, Annabelle Wallis, Hero Fiennes Tiffin, Zahn McClarnon, and Melanie Scrofano. The film is about a hunter and a sheriff who track down a murderer who may have kidnapped the hunter's daughter years before.

It was released through DirecTV Cinema on July 16, 2020, and in theaters and VOD on August 14, 2020, by Saban Films.

== Plot ==
Alcoholic Rayburn Swanson is the owner of the Gwen Swanson Sanctuary in northern Minnesota, named after his missing daughter. The sanctuary is an act of penance, both because Gwen disapproved of his trapper lifestyle and because she had disappeared from his car five years earlier while he went into a store to buy whiskey. Rayburn keeps hunters out by using surveillance cameras.

Sheriff Alice Gustafson is the sister of a troubled young man, Brooks. While examining the body of a young girl found by a lake, Alice notices a scar on the girl's throat, along with the point of a spearhead (marked with an “MB”) buried in a tree. After learning about the body, Rayburn arrives to make a positive ID, but it is not Gwen. Alice learns that the spear was used with a rare weapon known as an atlatl.

Rayburn sees a man in a ghillie suit stalking the woods; when Rayburn attempts to confront the man, he is wounded by a thrown spear. While fleeing, he comes across a black pickup truck with the license plates removed. He marks the truck by scratching a small 'x' on the fender. After returning home and stitching his wound, he reviews his surveillance footage and observes a girl being hunted in the sanctuary by the same man. Rayburn returns to the sanctuary and rescues the girl, Molly, then keeps her safe in an unused spike trap overnight. She was rendered mute, having a throat scar similar to the one on the dead girl. They make it back to the cabin the next evening but are ambushed by the hunter. The hunter injures Rayburn and stabs Molly with a spear. Alice arrives and, after seeing that Molly has been stabbed, immediately suspects Rayburn, until the hunter appears behind her. Still disguised, his mannerisms cause her to believe it is her brother. Alice shoots Rayburn, wounding him, and causing him to flee so that her brother can escape.

Alice searches for Rayburn and steps on a bear trap he had set, injuring her ankle. He escapes in her patrol car and calls an ambulance for Molly; Alice calls for Rayburn's arrest. He flees to the home of his former wife, Debbie, and her husband, Karl Blackhawk, Sheriff of the local Indian tribal police. They take him to the "Factory", an abandoned mill where the homeless stay, and call Dr. Jon Boone to treat him. Brooks coincidentally arrives and is arrested by Karl, although he has an alibi to establish his innocence through committing another less serious crime. Karl and Alice question Sam Moonblood, an indigenous man who sells atlatls, but the atlatl used by the killer was not one he'd made. Alice, realizing her moral failure, promises Molly, now hospitalized, that she will catch the killer. She also noticed the same throat scar on Molly.

Rayburn decides to clean up and throw out his liquor, except for the still unopened bottle he bought on the day Gwen had gone missing. He remembers the marked truck and locates it. After breaking into a house, he finds the same weapons and clothes worn by the killer, along with a trove of "missing" posters, including one for his daughter. After finding a still-living girl under a sheet with her throat surgically cut open, the killer appears and captures Rayburn by knocking him unconscious.

Alice notices issues with the autopsy report by Dr. Boone. While waiting for him in his office, she sees a photo of the doctor with his daughter Melissa wearing a necklace with the initials "MB". Alice realizes that Boone is the killer and immediately calls for backup to raid Boone's home; the same home Rayburn had found.

Boone explains to Rayburn that while grieving his own daughter, who had been killed by a drunk driver, he began kidnapping and killing teen girls with bad parents, including Rayburn. He claims they would have grown up as a drain on society like their parents, saying these were girls no one would miss, enraging Rayburn. Boone takes Rayburn to the wildlife sanctuary and forces him to flee so that he can be hunted. Alice sees Rayburn on the surveillance. Rayburn overpowers Boone and beats him severely as Alice arrives; she attempts to stop Rayburn, but he ignores her and throws Boone into one of the spike traps, mortally wounding him. Alice looks on as Rayburn closes the doctor in, telling her that they are even (he had lied earlier, saying the intruder shot him instead of Alice). She later sits in a patrol car, listening to the radio about the ongoing manhunt for Dr. Boone.

Rayburn and his ex-wife have a funeral for Gwen, which Molly attends, providing him closure. He then empties his last bottle of whisky into the lake in memory of his daughter.

== Cast ==
- Nikolaj Coster-Waldau as Rayburn Swanson, the hunter
- Annabelle Wallis as Alice Gustafson, Sheriff of Cutler County
- Hero Fiennes Tiffin as Brooks Gustafson, Alice's younger brother
- Zahn McClarnon as Karl Blackhawk
- Melanie Scrofano as Debbie
- Shaun Smyth as Dr. Boone
- Danielle Ryan as Dr. Patel

== Production ==
In May 2018, it was announced Nikolaj Coster-Waldau had joined the cast of the film, with Anders Engstom directing from a screenplay by Micah Ranum. In February 2019, Annabelle Wallis joined the cast of the film, with Robin Pront directing the film, replacing Engstom. In April 2019, Hero Fiennes Tiffin joined the cast of the film. In May 2019, Melanie Scrofano, Zahn McClarnon and Shaun Smyth joined the cast of the film.

Principal photography began in May 2019 in Canada. Filming took place in Greater Sudbury, Ontario.

== Release ==
The film was scheduled to have its world premiere at South by Southwest in March 2020, however the festival was canceled due to the COVID-19 pandemic. Shortly after, Saban Capital Group acquired the rights to the film for distribution through its division, Saban Films. It was released in the United States through DirecTV Cinema on July 16, 2020, and released in theaters and to video on demand on August 14, 2020. It was released in Canada on August 14, 2020. The film opened as the top rental in the country and opened on 79 screens, taking in $53,205, making it the top grossing new film release with the highest per-screen average in the United States. Over its first week of home release, it made around $5 million from VOD sales.

== Reception ==
On review aggregator website Rotten Tomatoes, the film holds an approval rating of 20% based on 25 reviews, with an average rating of 5/10. The site's critics consensus reads: "The Silencing mistakes mood for character development, leading to an undercooked mystery that fails to generate much interest."

Ronak Kotecha of The Times of India said that the film "is one of those serial killer sagas that's not so much about what it is telling you, but how it is telling you. And that's where it makes quite a killing".

Peter Travers of Rolling Stone gave it 2 out of 5.

Conversely, Jeannie Blue of Cryptic Rock gave the film 4 out of 5 stars.
