= After Ever Happy =

2022 film by Castille Landon

- Theatrical release poster
- Directed by: Castille Landon
- Screenplay by: Sharon Soboil
- Based on: After Ever Happy by Anna Todd
- Produced by: Jennifer Gibgot; Brian Pitt; Aron Levitz; Nicolas Chartier; Jonathan Deckter; Hero Fiennes Tiffin; Courtney Solomon; Mark Canton
- Starring: Josephine Langford; Hero Fiennes Tiffin; Louise Lombard; Rob Estes; Arielle Kebbel; Chance Perdomo; Frances Turner; Kiana Madeira; Carter Jenkins; Stephen Moyer; Mira Sorvino
- Cinematography: Rob C. Givens; Joshua Reis
- Edited by: Morgan Halsey
- Music by: George Kallis
- Production companies: Voltage Pictures; CalMaple Media; Ethea Entertainment; Wattpad Studios
- Distributed by: Voltage Pictures
- Release dates: August 22, 2022 (Italy); September 7, 2022 (United States)
- Running time: 95 minutes
- Country: United States
- Language: English
- Box office: $19.2 million

After Ever Happy (released in some countries as After Ever After and After Forever) is a 2022 American romantic drama film directed by Castille Landon from a screenplay by Sharon Soboil, based on the 2015 novel of the same name by Anna Todd. It is the sequel to After We Fell (2021) and the fourth installment in the After film series. The film stars Josephine Langford and Hero Fiennes Tiffin reprising their roles as Tessa Young and Hardin Scott, respectively.

The film was shot back-to-back in Bulgaria in 2020 with its predecessor, After We Fell.

After Ever Happy was released in Italy on August 22, 2022, in Europe from August 24, 2022, and was released in the United States on September 7, by Voltage Pictures. Like its predecessors, it received negative reviews.

== Plot ==
A few hours after Christian Vance reveals to Hardin he is his biological father, Hardin returns to his mother's wedding reception with Tessa, where he confronts her about the deception. Vance tries to explain himself, but he storms off with a bottle of whiskey.

That evening, Tessa finds a drunk Hardin breaking into Trish's house and setting the place on fire. He realizes his mistake and tries to put the fire out, to no avail. Vance arrives and sneaks Hardin out the back to Vance's car as the fire department arrives. Hardin wakes up the next morning and Tessa tells him Vance took the blame for the fire himself. They drive to a hill where they have sex.

Tessa and Hardin return to their hotel where she confides in Vance's fiancée Kimberley. Tessa tracks the missing Hardin down to a party, where she finds him drunk and high. She offers him a chance to live with her, but he declines, so she returns to the US.

Upon returning to their apartment, Tessa finds her father, dead from an apparent overdose. Landon calls Hardin dozens of times to let him know before he finally picks up. He hurries back to Tessa and tries to comfort her, but she shuts him out. Hardin argues with her mom, Carol, about whether he is good for Tessa as he always seems to abandon her.

Nevertheless Hardin, along with Landon, attends Richard's funeral to support Tessa. They go to a dinner hosted by Hardin's dad Ken, and Landon's mom Karen, along with Landon and his friend Nora, to say farewell to Landon as he moves to NYC for school, where Nora also lives.

After dinner, Tessa brings Hardin outside to talk. She tells him they need time apart to heal from their recent family traumas, so she has decided to leave Vance Publishing to move to NYC with Landon. Hardin is hurt by the bombshell and nearly hits Landon out of rage for not telling him. Landon reminds him he is also Tessa's friend as much as Hardin is his brother. Tessa gives him an ultimatum: if he loves her, he will not follow her there to let them have their time apart, to which he reluctantly agrees.

Tessa moves in with Landon and starts working with Nora at a fancy restaurant, while Hardin starts going to AA and graduates from university. Months later, Hardin comes to NYC for work so Landon offers to host him.

Tessa takes double shifts to avoid Hardin, but Landon and Hardin come to her restaurant and request her as their server. Hardin stays until she is off work and they talk about how they have been; Hardin's sobriety and Tessa waiting to get accepted into NYU. Over the next few days, they spend time together, slowly reconnecting, during which Landon finally starts a romantic relationship with Nora, much to Hardin and Tessa's happiness.

One night when Landon is at Nora's, Tessa and Hardin give in and have sex again. The next morning after Hardin leaves, Tessa finds a book draft in his bag, titled "After", documenting his life since their first kiss. When he returns, she confronts him about it, not wanting her life to be published for everyone to read about, however Hardin tells her there is already a bidding war for the book. He had read his journal during therapy, a publisher ended up reading it and everything escalated since. Tessa declares that their relationship is officially over.

Sometime later, Hardin's book has become a New York Times Best Seller. With not many friends at school and Landon having basically moved in with Nora, Tessa reaches out to Nora's friend Robert for company. That night, she sneaks into Hardin's book signing without him knowing so she can listen in. She misinterprets a look between him and a woman and as Tessa leaves, Hardin catches a glimpse of her.

== Cast ==
- Josephine Langford as Tessa Young
- Hero Fiennes Tiffin as Hardin Scott
- Louise Lombard as Trish Daniels
- Chance Perdomo as Landon Gibson
- Rob Estes as Ken Scott
- Arielle Kebbel as Kimberley
- Stephen Moyer as Christian Vance
- Anton Kottas as Smith
- Mira Sorvino as Carol Young
- Frances Turner as Karen Scott
- Kiana Madeira as Nora
- Jack Bandeira as James
- Carter Jenkins as Robert Freeman

== Production ==
=== Development ===
In September 2020, a feature film adaptation of After Ever Happy was announced to be in development. Developed at the same time as After We Fell, the films were announced to be directed by Castille Landon with Sharon Soboil serving as a screenwriter. Josephine Langford and Hero Fiennes-Tiffin were confirmed to reprise their roles as Tessa Young and Hardin Scott, respectively.

=== Filming ===
The film entered pre-production in September 2020, prior to the release of After We Collided. Principal photography took place, back-to-back with After We Fell. In December 2021, Louise Lombard, Kiana Madeira, Chance Perdomo, Rob Estes, and Carter Jenkins were confirmed to have reprised their roles from previous movies. The first teaser trailer was released in December 2021.

Photography took place in Bulgaria and wrapped production in December 2020. Landon stated that the novel series' realistic analysis of love, drew her to join the production, stating that her intent while directing the projects was to show that "romance isn't always beautiful". During production, the cast worked closely together and stayed in a hotel in a more isolated manner, while cameras weren't rolling, due to COVID-19 pandemic restrictions and protocols.

== Release ==
The film was released in Europe from August 22, 2022, and was later released in the United States on September 7, 2022, with Voltage Pictures another distribution companies.

== Reception ==
On the review aggregator website Rotten Tomatoes, 0% of 7 critics' reviews are positive, with an average rating of 2.6/10.

== Sequel ==
In August 2022, it was announced that production had commenced on a sequel to After Ever Happy, titled After Everything. Langford and Fiennes Tiffin reprised their roles as Tessa Young and Hardin Scott, respectively.

== Future ==
Another sequel and prequel were in development in 2021.
