= I Do, They Don't =

2005 television film

I Do, They Don't is a television movie starring Josie Bissett and Rob Estes. It premiered on ABC Family on March 20, 2005. It was directed by Steven Robman.

== Plot ==
Young widow Carrie Lewellyn has a successful cookies business and four kids: Moira, Andrew "Drew", little Nathan and little Daisy. Widower Jim Barber, a furniture maker, also has four: Sandy, Jeff, Andrew "Andy" and Lily, plus a dog, Java. On their first weekend trip to Vegas together, they get married in the casino church. When they get back both their kids find out by magazines and TV. To try to merge the families before they move into one house, the families meet for a picnic. They both realize how hard everything will be now. Jim's family has a dog but Carrie's son Drew is allergic. Jim's house is too small, and if they move into Carrie's they will be outsiders, but if they all move into a new house everyone would be uprooted. Moving day is a challenge as the Barbers move into Carrie's house, with Jim's eldest daughter, Sandy, being cold to Carrie. Andy. and Moira surprise everyone when they are found kissing in the back yard. To try to bring them together they have a hooky day. They go bowling, boys vs. girls. The girls win thanks to Carrie distracting Jim. When they do not fight, the kids try to play the parents against each other, which puts their marriage under pressure.

== Cast ==
- Josie Bissett as Carrie Lewellyn
- Rob Estes as Jim Barber
- Lyndsy Fonseca as Sandy Barber, Jim's older daughter
- Ephraim Ellis as Jeff Barber, Jim's older son
- Martha MacIsaac as Moira Lewellyn, Carrie's older daughter
- Fraser McGregor as Andrew Barber, Jim's younger son
- Clare Stone as Lily Barber, Jim's younger daughter
- Kristopher Clarke as Andrew Lewellyn, Carrie's older son
- Jason Spevack as Nathan Lewellyn, Carrie's younger son
- Jessie Wright as Daisy Lewellyn, Carrie's younger daughter
- Tyler Hynes as Rusty
- Jayne Eastwood as Thelma
- Junior Williams as Eric Eckart
- Rahnuma Panthaky as Ginny Falls
- Hal Roberts as Las Vegas Reporter
