= Nicolas Chartier =

French film producer

- Born: France
- Occupation: Film producer
- Awards: Academy Award for Best Picture (2010) BAFTA Award for Best Film (2010) PGA Award for Best Theatrical Motion Picture (2010)
- Website: voltagepictures.com

Nicolas Chartier (French: [nikɔla ʃaʁtje]) is a French film producer. In 2005, he founded Voltage Pictures, a film production and distribution company based in Los Angeles. He is its CEO.

== Beginning of career ==
During his time as a Disneyland Paris janitor, Chartier sold his first screenplay which allowed him to buy a one-way ticket to Los Angeles. In order to scrape together a living, he wrote softcore porn for cable television. He then held various executive level roles in both sales and acquisitions. He championed the sale of film My Big Fat Greek Wedding and Academy Award-winning film Crash directed by Paul Haggis, a Canadian screenwriter and director. Chartier founded Voltage Pictures, where his breakthrough film, The Hurt Locker, allowed him to produce other successful films.

== Career ==
=== Film ===
The Hurt Locker was Voltage's first in-house production and won six Academy Awards in 2009, including Best Picture. Killer Joe was Voltage's second production, directed by William Friedkin and starring Matthew McConaughey. In 2013, Chartier executive produced Dallas Buyers Club, for which Matthew McConaughey won the Academy Award for Best Actor and Jared Leto for Best Supporting Actor. Chartier also produced The Company You Keep, directed by Robert Redford and starring Redford and Shia LaBeouf; The Zero Theorem directed by Terry Gilliam, starring Christoph Waltz; Don Jon, directed by Joseph Gordon-Levitt, starring Scarlett Johansson and Julianne Moore; Good Kill, directed by Andrew Niccol, starring Ethan Hawke; Fathers and Daughters, starring Russell Crowe, Amanda Seyfried, and Aaron Paul; I.T. directed by John Moore starring Pierce Brosnan, and was an executive producer on A Tale of Love and Darkness, starring, written, and directed by Natalie Portman and was an official selection at the 2015 Cannes Film Festival.

Other movies include I Feel Pretty starring Amy Schumer and Michelle Williams, which grossed nearly $100 million worldwide; Extremely Wicked, Shockingly Evil and Vile starring Zac Efron and Lily Collins, which premiered at the 2019 Sundance Film festival; After starring Josephine Langford and Hero Fiennes Tiffin and based on the worldwide best-seller from Anna Todd; and Ava starring Jessica Chastain, Colin Farrell, John Malkovich, Common, and Geena Davis. Previous films produced by Chartier include Colossal written and directed by Nacho Vigalondo starring Anne Hathaway and Jason Sudeikis, and A Family Man directed by Mark Williams starring Gerard Butler which both premiered at the 2016 Toronto International Film Festival. He was also executive producer on Taylor Sheridan's directorial debut Wind River, starring Jeremy Renner and Elizabeth Olsen, which premiered to rave reviews at the 2017 Sundance Film Festival taking in over $44 million in worldwide box office.

Chartier is best known for his work in financing The Hurt Locker, directed by Kathryn Bigelow and starring Jeremy Renner. The film won many awards including an Academy Award. In 2006, The Hurt Locker script was circulated by Creative Artists Agency to foreign sales companies in the hopes of getting picked up and financed. Chartier, the owner of Voltage Pictures, called CAA to speak more in detail about the film as well as wanting to help produce it. The ask was for him to pay $20 million and Chartier pointed out that was too high of a budget. An Iraqi war drama with no notable stars attached, would be unlikely to receive any reasonable funding from skeptical foreign buyers. The budget was inevitably lowered by 35% to $13 million. In order to acquire proof of finance for a production loan, he managed to put together 25-30% of pre-sale loans from various territories including the EU, Asia, and even airline companies. Unable to get the bulk of the production loan in time before pre-production, Chartier put in his own money in order to finance the bulk of the film, going as far as mortgaging his own home. In all, the overall budget for The Hurt Locker was $15 million. The film generated $49.2 million at the box office.

Before the Oscars, the academy banned Chartier from the ceremony for sending out a mass email to voters to try to convince them to vote for the film rather than James Cameron's Avatar. In response, Chartier threw his own private party. Jeff Steele (CFO of Magnet Media Group) wrote about Chartier onThe Warp, a blog, "I would say that anybody who can cobble together the financing from pre-sales, gap, bridge, tax credits and equity funding to produce a theatrical feature worthy of consideration for Best Picture is already a winner in my book."

== Filmography as producer ==
- 2025 – Safe House (producer)
- 2021 – Stowaway (executive producer)
- 2020 – Ava (producer)
- 2019 – After (executive producer)
- 2019 – The Professor and The Madman (producer)
- 2019 – Extremely Wicked, Shockingly Evil, and Vile (producer)
- 2018 – Welcome Home (producer)
- 2018 – Then Came You (producer)
- 2018 – Distorted (executive producer)
- 2018 – I Feel Pretty (producer)
- 2018 – Elizabeth Harvest (executive producer)
- 2018 – Beast of Burden (executive producer)
- 2018 – The Titan (executive producer)
- 2017 – Revolt (producer)
- 2017 – Once Upon a Time in Venice (producer)
- 2017 – Keep Watching (producer)
- 2017 – Wind River (executive producer)
- 2016 – Lady Bloodfight (producer)
- 2016 – The Midnight Man (executive producer)
- 2016 – A Family Man (producer)
- 2016 – The Secret Scripture (executive producer)
- 2016 – Colossal (producer)
- 2016 – I.T. (producer)
- 2016 – Good Kids (producer)
- 2016 – Mr. Church (co-producer)
- 2015 – Fathers & Daughters (producer)
- 2015 – Pay the Ghost (producer)
- 2015 – A Tale of Love and Darkness (executive producer)
- 2014 – Playing It Cool (producer)
- 2014 – The Cobbler (executive producer)
- 2014 – Good Kill (producer)
- 2014 – Burying the Ex (executive producer)
- 2013 – Force of Execution (producer)
- 2013 – Dallas Buyers Club (executive producer)
- 2013 – The Zero Theorem (producer)
- 2013 – Charlie Countryman (executive producer)
- 2013 – Don Jon (executive producer)
- 2012 – Seal Team Six: The Raid on Osama Bin Laden (producer)
- 2010-2012 – True Justice (executive producer)
- 2012 – The Country You Keep (producer)
- 2012 – Generation Um... (executive producer)
- 2011 – Killer Joe (producer)
- 2010 – The Whistleblower (executive producer)
- 2009 – The Keeper (executive producer)
- 2008 – The Hurt Locker (producer)
- 2001 – Tangled (associate producer)
