= Anna Todd =

American author (born 1989)

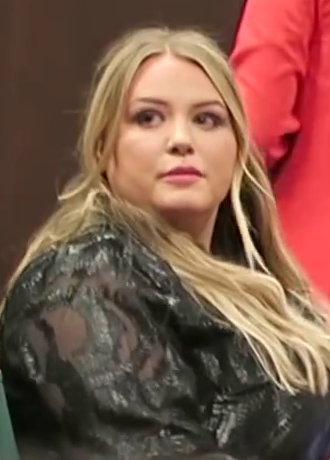
- Anna Todd in 2019
- Born: March 18, 1989 (age 37); Dayton, Ohio, U.S.
- Occupations: Author, film producer, screenwriter, influencer
- Years active: 2013–present
- Spouse: Jordan Todd (m. 2007; div. 2022) Jinwook Hong (m. 2025)
- Children: 1
- Website: https://annatodd.com/

Anna Renee Todd (born March 18, 1989) is an American novelist who is The New York Times bestselling author of the After series, the Brightest Stars trilogy, The Spring Girls, and The Last Sunrise. Todd began writing stories on her phone through Wattpad, with After becoming the platform's most-read series with over two billion reads. She has served as a producer and screenwriter on the film adaptations of After and After We Collided and is a producer on the film Regretting You from Paramount Pictures and the upcoming film The Last Sunrise for Amazon MGM studios.

In 2017, she founded the entertainment company Frayed Pages Media to produce work across film, television, and publishing.

In 2021, Todd announced Frayed Pages Media would be partnering with Wattpad for her publishing imprint, Frayed Pages x Wattpad Books, publishing 11 works as of 2025.

== Career ==
Todd's writing was initially inspired by the music and fandom of One Direction, and the singer Harry Styles is a model for the protagonist in her After series, Hardin Scott. She started by writing stories on her phone with the Wattpad app in 2013, publishing a chapter almost daily for over a year. Todd wrote three books in the After series on Wattpad.

The series has sometimes been compared to the Fifty Shades trilogy as both series had their start as fan fiction. Reviewers at the website Jezebel criticized the series and stated that it "echoes the troubling dynamics of 50 Shades," as they felt that Hardin's character "behaves at best like a prick, at worst like an abusive boyfriend in the making."

In 2015, Todd announced that she would be publishing Before, a prequel novel that tells the events of After from the perspective of Hardin Scott. Her next book, The Spring Girls, a re-telling of Louisa May Alcott's Little Women, was published in 2018.

In October 2014, Paramount Pictures acquired film rights to the After series with Offspring Entertainment set to produce. The film, based on her first book, was eventually released by Aviron Pictures on April 12, 2019. Josephine Langford portrays Tessa, the female protagonist, and Hero Fiennes Tiffin portrays Hardin, the male protagonist.

=== The After Series ===
Todd’s foray into writing started with writing fan fiction that was inspired by the music and fandom of One Direction. Todd wrote the After series on Wattpad via her phone by publishing chapters daily for over a year. The series, on Wattpad, ended with Todd writing over one million words.

After interest from multiple publishing houses, Todd signed with Gallery Books, a division of Simon & Schuster, to publish the After series in 2014. The original stories remained available for readers on her Wattpad profile, imaginator1d.

After was first published in 2014, with the subsequent books After We Collided, After We Fell, and After Ever Happy. The series was then followed by Before as well as The Landon Gibson series, Nothing More and Nothing Less. All books were published under the Gallery imprint. After has been published in over 35 languages and read over 2 billion times on Wattpad.

=== The Spring Girls ===
In January 2018 Gallery published the stand alone book, The Spring Girls. The book is a retelling of Louisa May Alcott’s classic, Little Women. Todd took on the daunting task of retelling the classic story, partly to “resolve her lifelong heartache over Jo and Laurie’s relationship.”

The Spring Girls is a contemporary novel by Anna Todd, published in 2018. It is a modern-day retelling of Louisa May Alcott's Little Women, set on a military base in New Orleans. The story follows the lives of the four Spring sisters—Meg, Jo, Beth, and Amy—as they navigate adolescence and early adulthood while their father is deployed overseas. With their mother managing the household in his absence, each sister faces personal challenges related to identity, ambition, love, and family dynamics. The novel explores sisterhood, resilience, and coming of age in the modern age.

=== Frayed Pages Media ===
In 2021, Todd started her own imprint in partnership with Wattpad Books. Frayed Pages will publish the author's future novels, as well as other writers' works. The imprint was announced in November 2021 along with the news that After would become a graphic novel, scheduled to be released in May of the next year.

In February 2022, Cosmopolitan announced the release of Todd's new novel to be published under her imprint. The Falling, which is a rewritten version of one of her previous works, The Brightest Stars, tells the story of a young girl named Karina falling in love with Kael, a soldier fighting to overcome PTSD following three deployments in Afghanistan. The following novels will complete the series: The Burning and The Infinite Light of Dust.

== Personal life ==
Born March 18, 1989, Todd was born and raised in Dayton, Ohio. In 2007 at the age of 18, she married her first husband, Jordan. With her husband having joined the army, the two moved to Fort Hood, Texas. Anna and Jordan divorced in 2022. The couple has one child, a son named Asher.

Todd's son Asher has tuberous sclerosis. Tuberous sclerosis is a rare genetic disorder that causes noncancerous tumors to develop in many parts of the body that are not expected. Symptoms vary widely, depending on where the growths develop and how large the tumors grow.

In August 2025, Anna married Jinwook Hong in Santa Barbara, California, with her son at her side. She announced that she had gotten married on her Instagram account with a carousel of her wedding photos.

Todd and her husband, Jinwook, along with her son Asher and golden doodle Winnie, live in the Los Angeles area.

== Bibliography ==
=== Single novels ===
- Imagines: Keeping the Kool (co-written with Kevin Fanning and Kate J. Squires – April 2017)
- The Spring Girls: A Modern-Day Retelling of Little Women (2018)
- The Last Sunrise (May 6, 2025)

=== After series ===
1. After (October 2014)
2. After We Collided (November 2014)
3. After We Fell (December 2014)
4. After Ever Happy (February 2015)
5. Before (Prequel) (December 2015)

==== Landon series ====
1. Nothing More (September 2016)
2. Nothing Less (December 2016)

==== After graphic novels ====
1. After: The Graphic Novel (Volume One) (May 2022)
2. After: The Graphic Novel (Volume Two) (October 2023)

=== Stars series ===
1. The Falling (July 2022)
2. The Burning (August 2023)
3. The Infinite Light of Dust (July 2024)
