= Carter Jenkins =

American actor (born 1991)

- Jenkins in 2026
- Born: September 5, 1991 (age 35)
- Occupation: Actor
- Years active: 2001–present

Carter Jenkins (born September 5, 1991) is an American actor. He is best known for his roles in the films Aliens in the Attic (2009), Valentine's Day (2010), and Struck by Lightning (2012) and the After film series. On television, Jenkins was part of the main cast of Surface (2005–2006), Viva Laughlin (2007), and Famous in Love (2017–2018).

== Early life ==
Jenkins is the son of Mary and Eric Jenkins. He grew up in Carrollwood, Florida, where he attended Independent Day School. His family later moved to Sherman Oaks, Los Angeles. He has an older brother, Renneker Jenkins, who is also an actor, and an older sister, Tiffany. Like his character in Keeping Up with the Steins, Jenkins is Jewish, and attended Hebrew school.

== Career ==
Jenkins began performing in community theatre, and then on local and national commercials. He played lead roles in the television series Surface (2005–06) and Viva Laughlin (2007), and guest starred in episodes of CSI: Miami, House, CSI: NY, Without a Trace, The Bernie Mac Show, and Unfabulous. He has also starred in feature films such as Bad News Bears and Keeping Up with the Steins, and starred in the television film Life Is Ruff.

In 2009, Jenkins appeared in the film Aliens in the Attic, playing the lead role Tom Pearson. In 2010, he appeared in the romantic-comedy Valentine's Day, playing Alex Franklin, the boyfriend of Emma Roberts' character. Jenkins had a supporting role in the 2012 coming-of-age comedy-drama Struck by Lightning, which starred Chris Colfer, who also wrote the screenplay. In 2015, Jenkins portrayed one of the main roles in the supernatural thriller film Nightlight. He starred as Rainer Devon on Freeform's Famous in Love from 2017 to 2018. In 2020, he joined the cast of the After film franchise.

== Filmography ==
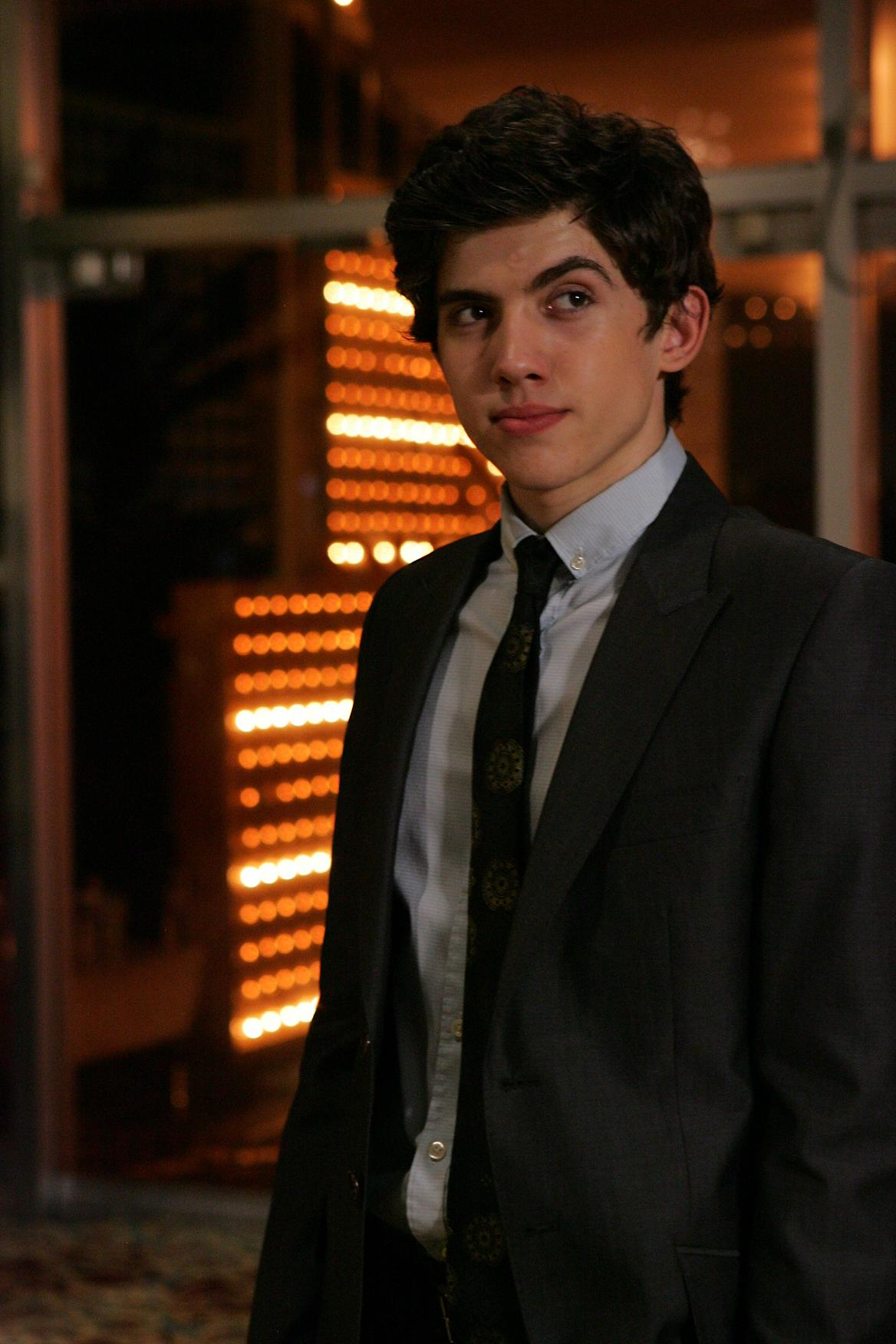
Jenkins in 2008

=== Film ===
Year	Title	Role	Notes
2003	The Honor System	Peg	Short film
2004	The Three Body Problem	Byron	Short film
2005	Bad News Bears	Joey Bullock	
2005	Life Is Ruff	Preston Price	Television movie
2006	Think Tank	Young Dex	
2006	Keeping Up with the Steins	Zachary Stein	
2008	A Day's Work	Zack	Short film
2009	Aliens in the Attic	Tom Pearson	
2010	Valentine's Day	Alex Franklin	
2010	Arcadia Lost	Sye	
2011	JAW	Seth	Short film
2012	The Nevsky Prospect	David	
2012	Struck by Lightning	Nicholas Forbes	
2012	Happenstance	Nick	Short film
2013	Life Life in in Space Space	Inspector Shnotzy	Short film
2014	Heavy Water	River	
2014	Drink	Gray	Short film
2015	Nightlight	Chris	
2015	Circle	The College Guy	
2015	A Light Beneath Their Feet	Jeremy	
2015	Tales from the Darkside	Carter	Television movie
2015	Any Tom, Dick, or Harry	JJ Hale	Television movie
2016	Summer of 8	Jesse	
2021	After We Fell	Robert Freeman	
2022	After Ever Happy	Robert Freeman	
2023	After Everything	Robert Freeman	
2025	Paws in the City	Theo	Television film

=== Television ===
Year	Title	Role	Notes
2003	Without a Trace	Kyle	Episode: "Fallout: Part 1"
2003	Jimmy Kimmel Live!	Kid	Episode #1.134
2003	Run of the House	Young Kurt Franklin	Episode: "Just Like Mom"
2003–2004	The Bernie Mac Show	Michael	2 episodes
2004	Joint Custody	Nate	Unsold The WB pilot
2004	Scrubs	Young Todd Quinlan	Episode: "My Tormented Mentor"
2004	Oliver Beene	Boy	Episode: "Babysitting"
2004	Everwood	David Beck	Episode: "Staking Claim"
2004–2005	Unfabulous	Eli Pataki	Recurring role, 9 episodes
2005	Surface	Miles Barnett	Main role
2005	CSI: NY	Will Galanis	Episode: "Tri-Borough"
2005	Lost	Young Tom Brennan	Episode: "Born to Run"
2006	The 4400	Todd Barstow	Episode: "Graduation Day"
2006	House	Mark McNeil	Episode: "Meaning"
2006	CSI: Miami	Raymond Caine Jr.	Episode: "Rio"
2007	Viva Laughlin	Jack Holden	Main role
2009–2010	Lie to Me	Rick Massey	2 episodes
2014	Chosen	Reid	Episode: "Downward Spiral"
2014	The Following	Preston Tanner	4 episodes
2015	Mad Men	Andy	Episode: "The Milk and Honey Route"
2015	Tales from the Darkside	Carter	Unsold The CW pilot
2015	Any Tom, Dick, or Harry	JJ Hale	Television film; also writer
2016	Aquarius	William Garretson	Episode: "Everyone's Got Something to Hide Except Me and My Monkey"
2016	Sweet/Vicious	Will Powell	2 episodes
2017–2018	Famous in Love	Rainer Devon	Main role
2020	Doom Patrol	Johnny Bills	Episode: "Wax Patrol"
2020	Kappa Kappa Die	Stewart	CW Seed Halloween special
2022	Women of the Movement	Roy Bryant	Main role

=== Podcasts ===
Year	Title	Role	Notes	Ref.
2020–2021	The Shadow Diaries	Cooper Rose	Voice role	
