= Fan fiction =

Type of fiction created by fans of the original subject

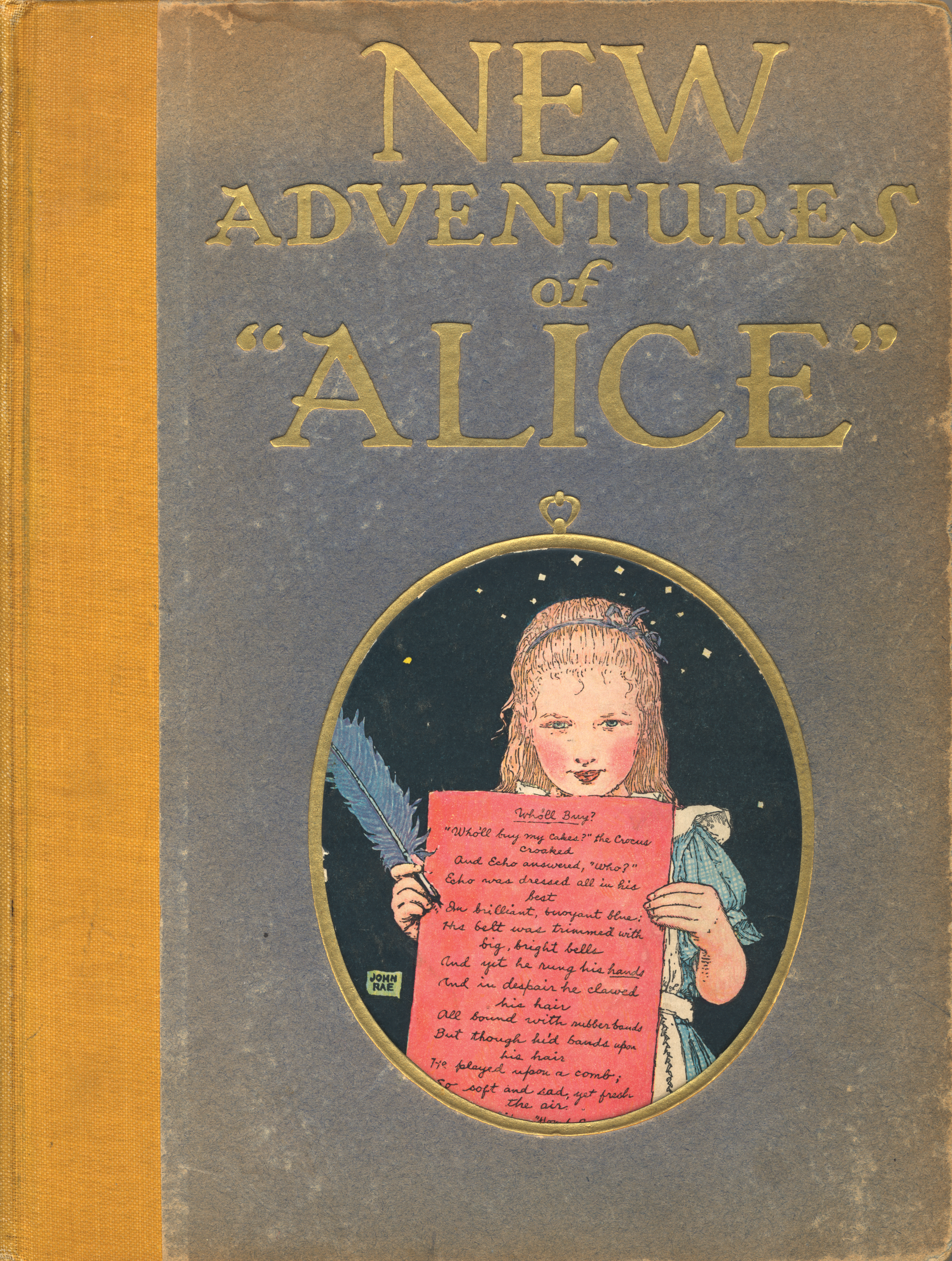
New Adventures of Alice (1917) by John Rae, an early pastiche or fan fiction

Fan fiction or fanfiction, also known as fan fic, fanfic, fic or FF, is fiction typically written in an amateur capacity by fans as a form of fan labor, unauthorized by, but based on, an existing work of fiction and/or real people with a cultural presence. The author uses copyrighted characters, settings, or other intellectual properties from the original creator(s) as a basis for their writing and can retain the original characters and settings, change them, (for example, by adding or removing characters, themes, or plot points) or both. Fan fiction ranges in length from a few sentences to novel-length and can be based on fictional and non-fictional media, including novels, movies, comics, television shows, musical groups, theatrical productions, cartoons, web series, anime, manga, and video games.

Fan fiction is rarely commissioned or authorized by the original work's creator or publisher or professionally published. It may infringe on the original author's copyright, depending on the jurisdiction and on legal questions, such as whether or not it qualifies as "fair use" (see Legal issues with fan fiction). The attitudes of authors and copyright owners of original works towards fan fiction have ranged from encouragement to indifference or disapproval, and they have occasionally responded with legal action.

The term came into use in the 20th century as copyright laws began to distinguish between stories using established characters that were authorized by the copyright holder and those that were not.

Fan fiction is defined by being related to its subject's canonical fictional universe, either staying within those boundaries but not being part of the canon, or being set in an alternative universe. Thus, what is considered "fanon" is separate from canon. Fan fiction is often written and published among fans, and as such does not usually cater to readers without knowledge of the original media.

== Definition ==
The term fan fiction has been used in print as early as 1938; in the earliest known citations, it refers to amateur-written science fiction, as opposed to "pro fiction". The term also appears in the 1944 Fancyclopedia, an encyclopaedia of fandom jargon, in which it is defined as "fiction about fans, or sometimes about pros, and occasionally bringing in some famous characters from [science fiction] stories". It also mentions that the term is "sometimes improperly used to mean fan science fiction; that is, ordinary fantasy published in a fan magazine".

== History ==
=== Before copyright ===
Before the adoption of copyright in the modern sense, it was common for authors to copy characters or plots from other works. For instance, Shakespeare's plays Romeo and Juliet, Much Ado About Nothing, Othello, As You Like It and The Winter's Tale were based on recent works by other authors of the time.

In 1614, Alonso Fernández de Avellaneda wrote a sequel to Miguel de Cervantes's Don Quixote before he had finished and published his own second volume.

There is a debate within the fanfiction community as to whether or not Dante Alighieri's Inferno can be considered self-insert fanfiction of the Bible.

=== 19th century ===
Among 19th-century literature that has been subject to depictions not authorized by the original author include Bram Stoker's Dracula's depiction in the translated adaptation Powers of Darkness. The works of Jane Austen remain among the most popular works for unauthorized adaptations, with a notable example of Jane Austen fan fiction being Old Friends and New Fancies. Many unauthorized stories of Sherlock Holmes by Arthur Conan Doyle have been created, including The Adventure of the Two Collaborators by J. M. Barrie. Other notable works include The Space Machine and Morlock Night, respectively based on The War of the Worlds and The Time Machine by H. G. Wells; A New Alice in the Old Wonderland, based on Alice's Adventures in Wonderland by Lewis Carroll; and Wide Sargasso Sea, based on Jane Eyre by Charlotte Brontë.

=== Star Trek fandom ===
The Star Trek fanzine Spockanalia contained the first fan fiction in the modern sense of the term.

The modern phenomenon of fan fiction as an expression of fandom and fan interaction was popularized and defined by the Star Trek fandom and its fanzines, which were published in the 1960s. The first Star Trek fanzine, Spockanalia (1967), contained some fan fiction; many others followed its example. These fanzines were produced using offset printing and mimeography and mailed to other fans or sold at science fiction conventions for a small fee to cover the cost of production. Unlike other aspects of fandom, women were the primary authors of fan fiction; 83% of Star Trek fan fiction authors were female by 1970, and 90% by 1973. One scholar states that fan fiction "fill[s] the need of a mostly female audience for fictional narratives that expand the boundary of the official source products offered on the television and movie screen."

=== Internet ===
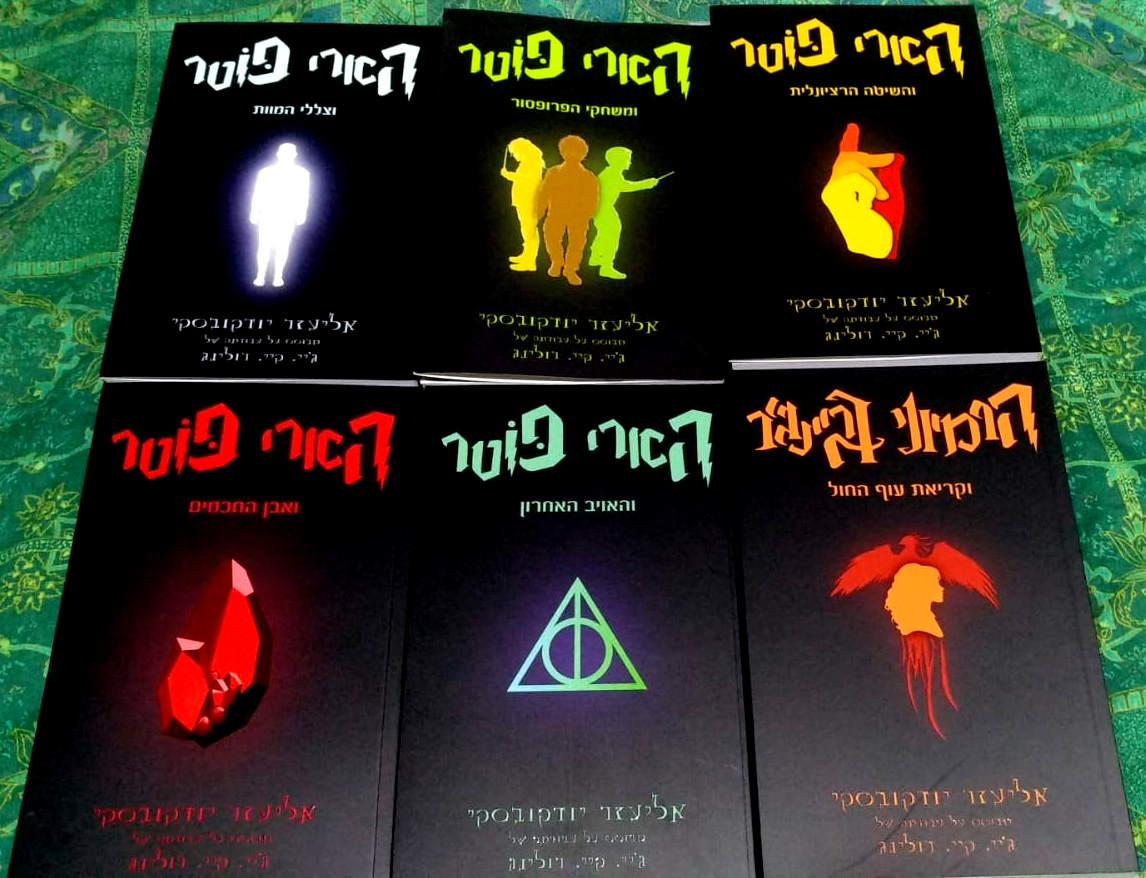
Harry Potter and the Methods of Rationality is a notable work of fan fiction inspired by Harry Potter that was initially published online.

Fan fiction has become more popular and widespread since the advent of the Internet. According to one estimate, fan fiction comprises one-third of all book-related content on the Internet. In addition to traditional fanzines and conventions, Usenet newsgroups and electronic mailing lists were established for fan fiction and fan discussion. Online, searchable archives of fan fiction were also created, with these archives initially being non-commercial hand-tended and specific to a fandom or topic. These archives were followed by non-commercial automated databases. In 1998, the non-profit site FanFiction.Net was launched, which allowed anyone to upload content in any fandom. The ability to self-publish fan fiction in an easily accessible archive that did not require insider knowledge to join, as well as the ability to review stories directly on the site, led the site to quickly gain popularity. A popular example of modern fan fiction is E. L. James's Fifty Shades of Grey, which was originally written as fan fiction for the Twilight series and featured Bella and Edward. To avoid copyright infringement, James changed the characters' names to Ana and Christian for the purposes of her novels, a practice known as 'pulling-to-publish'. Anna Todd's 2013 fan fiction After, about the boy band One Direction, secured a book and movie deal with renamed characters in 2014. A movie adaptation, After, was released on April 12, 2019.

On May 22, 2013, online retailer Amazon launched a new publishing service, Kindle Worlds, which allowed fan fiction of certain licensed media properties to be sold in the Kindle Store, with terms including 35% of net sales for works of 10,000 words or more and 20% for short fiction ranging from 5,000 to 10,000 words. However, this arrangement included restrictions on content, copyright violations, poor document formatting, and use of misleading titles. Amazon shut down Kindle Worlds in August 2018.

=== Japanese doujinshi ===
A similar trend began in Japan in the 1960s and 1970s, as doujinshi, independently published manga and novels, were published by doujin circles, with many being based on existing manga, anime, and video game franchises. Manga artists such as Shotaro Ishinomori and Fujiko Fujio formed doujin groups, such as Fujio's New Manga Party (新漫画党, Shin Manga-tō). At the time, artists used doujin groups to make their debut as professional artists. This changed in the following decades, as doujinshi became more popular and doujin groups formed in groups such as school clubs. This culminated in 1975 with the Comiket, a convention in Tokyo that helped to establish the fandom.

== Demographics ==
A 2010 study found that 75.2% of account holders on FanFiction.Net allowed the website to disclose their location and that 57% of accounts originated from the United States, followed by 9.2% created in the United Kingdom, 5.6% in Canada, and 4% in Australia.

A 2020 study of Harry Potter fan fiction writers on Archive Of Our Own (AO3) found that of the surveyed profiles that stated their location, 59.7% were located in North America, 16.9% in Great Britain and an additional 10.1% in Mainland Europe, 6.3% in Oceania, 2.8% in Scandinavia, 2.2% in Asia, 1.8% in South America and the Caribbean, and 0.2% in the Middle East. The study did not include profiles written in Chinese, Greek, Indonesian, Japanese, Korean, Polish, Russian, or Turkish.

The same study of Harry Potter fan fiction authors found that of the users who disclosed their gender in their profiles, 50.4% were female or femme-leaning and 13.4% were male or masc-leaning. 11% of users were transgender, 21% identified as nonbinary, genderfluid, and/or genderqueer, and an additional 3.9% stated that they identified as agender or genderless.

The study also found that Harry Potter fan fiction writers tend to be in their early to mid-20s. Of these writers, 56.7% were university students and young adults, 21.3% were 30 years or older, 19.8% were teenagers, and 0.2% were of retirement age.

Unlike many fan fiction communities that trend female in participation, Fimfiction (the largest repository for My Little Pony: Friendship Is Magic fan fiction) has a predominantly male audience.

== Categories and terms ==
=== Genres ===
In addition to the "regular" list of genres, there are some genres particularly associated with fan fiction. These genres can overlap and include:

==== Angst ====
Stories with an angst-ridden mood that focus on a character or characters who are brooding, sorrowful, or in anguish.

==== Alternative universe (AU) ====
Stories that feature characters set in a universe other than their canonical one. There are several types of alternative universe: it may make dramatic changes to the setting, such as a "fantasy AU" that places characters from a non-fantasy canon in a world of magic; change characterization, which is often referred to as someone being "out of character" (OOC) rather than a proper AU; or change major plot events to suit the author's purposes, such as in a fix-it fic.

===== Soulmate AU =====
Stories that feature characters in a world, often very similar to canon, where soulmates are real. Common mechanics include a person having their soulmate's name written on their skin at birth or a specific change that occurs when two soulmates see or touch each other for the first time. The most common trope in this genre is a character being convinced that they do not have, want, or deserve a soulmate, only to be proven wrong as they fall in love.

===== Time travel AU =====
Stories in which a character is sent back in time to get a second chance while having knowledge of the original plot. It is also called "Peggy Sue" after the movie Peggy Sue Got Married, in which this scenario happens to the titular character. "Groundhog Day", named after the film, is a variation of this trope in which time travel happens repeatedly, usually until the time traveler "gets it right".

==== Crossover ====
Stories that feature characters, items, or locations from multiple fandoms. Another type of crossover is "fusion fic", in which the two universes are merged into one.

==== Darkfic ====
Stories that are darker or more depressing than the original, often done in contrast to them. This is sometimes done with media that is intended to be light-hearted or for children. Darkfic can also refer to content that is "intentionally disturbing", such as physical or emotional violence or abuse. However, not all stories tagged as "dark" are considered to be a darkfic.

"Dead Dove Do Not Eat", sometimes abbreviated as DDDNE, is a sub-category of darkfic. It began as an AO3 tag in 2015, intended to warn people that the story contained dark themes without explicitly condemning them; because the dark themes were tagged, it served to reinforce readers' attention to them. Since 2015, it has evolved into its own tag, usually meaning that readers should take any other tagged dark themes more seriously than they otherwise would.

This term is in reference to the TV sitcom Arrested Development, in which a character opens a bag that says "Dead Dove" on the outside only to discover that within it is a dead dove. The character then remarks "I don't know what I expected." This is used to illustrate that fanfictions tagged with this tag should be reviewed carefully, as the other tags should be taken seriously by the reader before reading, and thus the tag is in dialogue with other genre and warning tags on the fic.

==== Fix-it fic ====
Stories that rewrite canonical events that the author disliked or otherwise wanted to "fix", such as major plot holes or a tragic event or ending; for instance, an alternate universe where "everyone lives". Fix-it fics that focus on correcting flaws in the original work are also known as a "rebuild fic", named after the Rebuild of Evangelion series. If it focuses heavily on critical thinking skills and deductive reasoning, it can be considered a "rationalist rewrite", as popularized by Harry Potter and the Methods of Rationality.

==== Fluff ====
Stories designed to be light-hearted and romantic. Another term for this genre is WAFF, which is short for "warm and fuzzy feelings".

==== Hurt/comfort ====
Stories in which a character is put through a traumatic experience in order to be comforted. The climax of these stories is usually when one character witnesses another character's suffering and alleviates it. Another type of hurt/comfort is whump, which focuses on the character's suffering, sometimes to the exclusion of comfort; excessive whump may also be considered darkfic.

==== Self-insert ====
Stories in which a version of the author is transported to the fictional world that the fan fiction is based on, which are often written in the first person. Self-insert fanfiction is often compared to Mary Sue characters. Some researchers argue that self-insert characters can be found in literature from the 19th century and earlier. There are several types of self-inserts, including: "y/n" (short for "[insert] your name"), "xReader", and "imagines". Several of these subgenres are unique to specific platforms.

==== Recursive/meta/fan-verse ====
Stories based on an existing fan work. On Archive of Our Own, this type of recursive fan fiction is called a "remix".

==== Songfic ====
Stories which are interspersed with the lyrics of a relevant song. The term is a combination of "song" and "fiction"; as such, it is also referred to as "songfiction". Since many song lyrics are under copyright, whether songfics are a violation of copyright law is a subject of debate. Some fan fiction sites, such as FanFiction.Net, have prevented authors from posting songfics with lyrics from songs that are not in the public domain.

In an essay in Music, Sound, and Silence in Buffy the Vampire Slayer, University of Sydney professor Catherine Driscoll commented that the genre was "one of the least distinguished modes of fan production" and that "within fan fiction excessive attachment to or foregrounding of popular music is itself dismissed as immature and derivative".

==== Uberfic ====
Uberfic is a form of alternative universe in which characters physically resemble and share personality traits with their canon counterparts, but have new names and backgrounds in a different setting. The term originated in the Xena: Warrior Princess fandom and was inspired by the episode "The Xena Scrolls", which featured 1940s-era descendants of the characters Xena, Gabrielle, and Joxer, who are played by their respective actors, on an archaeological dig in an Indiana Jones pastiche. As the concept of the uberfic can be adapted into original fiction, many uberfic authors, such as Melissa Good, Radclyffe, and Lori L. Lake, have legally published their Xena uberfic as original lesbian literature.

==== Trollfic ====
A type of satirical fanfiction, often created to mock and/or comment on specific fandoms, fandom tropes, or fandom participants. The word "trollfic" is derived from "trolling", an internet slang term for purposefully annoying online behavior. While some trollfics openly disclose their satirical status, many are posted under kayfabe, with the author playing a character when posting/interacting with readers. Because of this purposeful obscuring of authorial intent, many works of fanfiction (such as infamous Harry Potter fanwork My Immortal) are suspected of being trollfics, but few have been definitively proven as such.

=== Terminology ===
==== Author's note (A/N) ====
Also abbreviated as A/N, author's notes are typically found directly before the beginning or after the end of a fan fiction or its chapters, but can be written at any point in the story and are used to convey direct messages from the author to the reader regarding it.

==== Beta reader ====
Also known as a beta. Someone who edits or proofreads someone else's fan fiction.

==== Canon ====
The original story. This refers to anything related to the original source, including the plot, setting, and characters.

==== Disclaimer ====
Disclaimers are author's notes which typically inform readers about who deserves credit for the original source material, and often containing pseudo-legal language disavowing any intent of copyright infringement or alluding to fair use. Such disclaimers have no legal effect, as intent does not change whether a derivative work is a fair use or an infringement. Disclaimers have fallen out of use since Archive of Our Own's rise in popularity.

==== Drabble ====
A drabble is a piece of writing that is exactly 100 words long, although it is commonly used to refer to any short fan fiction.

==== Fandom ====
A fandom is a group of fans of a work of fiction who dedicate their time and energy to their interest. Fan labor, such as fan fiction, is written by fans as a way to express their creativity and love for the original work.

==== Fangirl/fanboy ====
A person who is an enthusiastic member of one or more fandoms. The term fangirling/fanboying refers to when a person is excited about a fandom.

==== Fanon ====
A portmanteau of fan and canon. It is an "unofficial canon" idea that is widely accepted to be true among fans, but is neither confirmed nor officially endorsed by the original author or source creator, preventing it from being considered canon. Fanon can refer to an interpretation of the original work or details within it.

==== Hanahaki disease ====
Hanahaki disease is a fictional disease that is used as a trope in fanworks. This disease takes form in the growing of flowers from one party in a pairing when they are not in a requited relationship with them. This can be with knowledge of having interest in said party or without knowledge.

==== Head canon (HC) ====
A fan's personal interpretation of canon, such as the backstory of a character or the nature of relationships between characters. It can be drawn from subtext present in the canon, but cannot directly contradict it. If other fans share this interpretation, it can become fanon.

==== Mary Sue ====
A Mary Sue, also known as MS, is a term which editors and writers credit as originating in Star Trek fan fiction and later becoming part of the mainstream. In early fan fiction, a common plot was a minor member of the USS Enterprise's crew saving the life of Kirk or Spock, often being rewarded with a sexual relationship as a result. The term "Mary Sue", which originated in a parody of stories in the wish fulfillment genre, often refers to an idealized or overpowered character who lacks flaws and is often seen as a representation of the author.

==== One true pairing (OTP) ====
An abbreviation of the term "one true pairing", referring to a person's favorite ship. OT3, OT4, and so on is the term used for a polyamorous OTP.

==== One shot ====
A standalone piece of writing, as opposed to a multichapter work.

==== Real person fiction (RPF) ====
Stories about real people, usually celebrities, rather than fictional characters. Real person fiction is sometimes edited and published as original fiction. For example, the book After by Anna Todd, later adapted into a film of the same name, was originally a real person fan fiction about One Direction member Harry Styles.

==== Shipping ====
Shipping is a variant of romance that focuses on exploring a relationship between two or more characters from the original fandom(s). It has several fandom-specific subgenres, including slash, which focuses on homosexual pairings, and femslash, which is similar but instead focuses on lesbian pairings. The term "shipping" can also refer to a fan who is heavily invested in a relationship between two characters. Writers of fan fiction often use the genre to explore homosexual pairings for popular characters who are not in, or not specified to be in, homosexual relationships in canon. A subcategory of shipping, "curtainfic", which depicts romantic couples in mundane domestic situations such as picking out curtains, was once used but has somewhat fallen out of use.

==== Smut ====
Also known as porn or erotica. Sexually explicit or pornographic fan fiction, which can be a part of a story or the entire story. Historically, the terms "lemon", or explicit pornography, and "lime", sexually suggestive works, were euphemisms used to refer to explicit material. These terms were once common in the 2000s, but fell out of use before becoming popular again in December 2018 due to the censorship of adult content on Tumblr, as it allowed writers to circumvent "explicit terminologies" that could get their work flagged by platforms like Tumblr while still being able to tag their work as explicit.

==== Trigger warning (TW) ====
Trigger warnings are used to warn people of content in fan fiction that could be harmful or "triggering" for those who have dealt with traumatic situations, allowing them to prepare for or avoid certain content. Sometimes, content warning (CW) is used, either instead of or in addition to a trigger warning.

Trigger warnings are usually used when the subject matter of a work deals with issues such as drug abuse, mental illness, abuse, or extreme violence. Archive of Our Own has codified a system of common warnings into its core tags, requiring authors to either disclose or explicitly choose not to disclose if their work contains graphic violence, major character death, rape, or underage sex.

== Interactivity in the online era ==
Reviews can be posted by both anonymous and registered users on most sites, which are often programmed to notify the author of new feedback. This makes them a common way for readers and authors to communicate online, as well as to help authors improve their writing through constructive criticism. Occasionally, unmoderated review systems are abused for flaming, spam, or trolling; to prevent this, an author can either disable or enable anonymous reviews, depending on their preference. Fan fiction has also been shown to improve literacy by allowing authors to have a wider audience for their works and encouraging people to write.

Other ways that members of a fandom can participate in their community include gift exchanges and fic exchanges. A gift exchange is an organized challenge in which participants create fan fiction for other participants. They may research what the user receiving their gift enjoys or submissions may include a "letter" explaining what the recipient wants or does not want.

== Social and psychological aspects ==
=== Escapism and coping ===
Fanfiction provides an alternative narrative space that allows readers to distance themselves from everyday stressors or unsatisfying circumstances. Engagement with narrative texts draws readers into fictional settings and characters that hold personal meaning. This form of engagement allows readers to control how they experience a story, such as rereading favoured sections or skipping less engaging parts. This contributes to a sense of agency.

In fanfiction, this experience is shaped by the flexibility of familiar stories. Writers create alternative versions of existing narratives, including alternate universes that change characters or events, and "allows writers and readers to engage their own experience more directly, saturating the imaginary worlds they have created with a variety of details and cultural discourses that are of personal importance for them".

=== Identity rehearsal ===
For adolescent readers and writers, fanfiction can function as a form of identity rehearsal, in which fictional characters provide a means of exploring possible selves, relationships, and futures within an imaginative setting.

Within fan culture, more broadly, emotionally sustained engagement with fictional texts has been described as taking place in a conceptual "third space" situated between internal psychological experience and external cultural materials. In this space, interaction with a text is both personally lived through and externally shared, combining subjective emotional investment with participation in a common cultural object. This framework has been used to account for the intensity and durability of fans' attachments to particular narratives and characters. When applied to fanfiction, this form of engagement provides a space where "fan fiction writers can experience, feel and live in a playful way within the texts".

=== Narrative expansion and revision ===
The desire to expand parts of a story that were left unclear or undeveloped in the original source material, such as characters' inner lives or background histories, has also been identified as a motivation for fanfiction engagement. Fans create "fix-it" stories, which revise or undo plot developments that were viewed as unsatisfying, such as character deaths or unresolved endings, in order to provide emotional closure or alternative outcomes.

=== Community and belonging ===
Fandom (including fanfiction) communities have been identified as commonly operating through a "gift" economy, where participants exchange fan-created works for rewards such as feedback, commentary, reviews, or "likes". Interaction with other fans can strengthen social connectedness, particularly within online environments where shared interests provide a basis for sustained engagement and interpersonal connection. These forms of exchange support ongoing participation by reinforcing social bonds and encouraging continued creative contribution.

== Legality ==
There is ongoing debate about to what extent fan fiction is permitted under contemporary copyright law.

Some argue that fan fiction does not fall under fair use, as it is derivative work. The 2009 ruling by United States District Court Judge Deborah Batts, permanently prohibiting publication in the United States of a book by Fredrik Colting (under the name John David California ), a Swedish writer whose protagonist is a 76-year-old version of Holden Caulfield of The Catcher in the Rye, may be seen as upholding this position regarding publishing fan fiction, as the judge stated, "To the extent Defendants contend that 60 Years and the character of Mr. C direct parodied comment or criticism at Catcher or Holden Caulfield, as opposed to Salinger himself, the Court finds such contentions to be post-hoc rationalizations employed through vague generalizations about the alleged naivety of the original, rather than reasonably perceivable parody."

Others such as the Organization for Transformative Works (OTW) uphold the legality of non-profit fan fiction under the fair use doctrine, as it is a creative, transformative process. The terms of service of Archive of Our Own, a site run by OTW, distinguishes between "transformative" and "non-transformative" fan works, allowing only fan works that they consider transformative and prohibiting verbatim copying of pre-existing fan works or posting adaptations that only make minor modifications to an existing work, such as audio narrations (podfics), translations, and "conversions" (works in which "the original content is modified slightly to fit a different fandom, ship, character, or format"), without the permission of the copyright holder.

Jamar and Bloom (2014) point out that works of fan fiction vary widely in the amount of copyrightable expression they borrow from their source material, "from works that merely rewrite endings... to those that create whole new stories with new plot lines and new characters" set in existing fictional universes. They point out that many aspects of fictional worlds may not be copyrightable at all, as copyright only protects expression, not ideas. On the other hand, Klapper (2025) claims that even fan works that only borrow the settings "are likely using a significant portion of the original work on a qualitative level."

In 1981, Lucasfilm Ltd. sent out a letter to several fanzine publishers, asserting Lucasfilm's copyright to all Star Wars characters and insisting that no fanzine publish pornography. The letter also alluded to possible legal action that could be taken against fanzines that did not comply.

The Harry Potter Lexicon is one case where the encyclopedia-like website for the Harry Potter series moved towards publishing and commercializing the Lexicon as a supplementary and complementary source of information to the series. Author J. K. Rowling and her publishers levied a lawsuit against the website creator, Steven Vander Ark, and the publishing company, RDR Books, for a breach of copyright. While the lawsuit did conclude in Vander Ark's favor, the main issue in contention was the majority of the Lexicon copied a majority of the series' material and does not transform enough of the material to be held separately from the series itself. While the HP Lexicon case is an example of Western cultural treatment of fan fiction and copyright law, in China, Harry Potter fan fiction is less addressed in legal conflicts but is used as a cultural and educational tool between Western and Chinese cultures. More specifically, while there are a number of "fake" Harry Potter books in China, most of these books are said to be addressing concepts and issues found in Chinese culture. This transformative usage of Harry Potter in fan fiction is allegedly from the desire to enhance and express value to Chinese tradition and culture.

Some prominent authors have given their blessings to fan fiction, notably J. K. Rowling. By 2014, there were already almost 750,000 Harry Potter fan stories on the web, ranging from short stories to novel-length tomes. Rowling said she was "flattered" that people wanted to write their own stories based on her fictional characters. Similarly, Stephenie Meyer has put links on her website to fan fiction sites about her characters from the Twilight series. The Fifty Shades trilogy was developed from a Twilight fan fiction originally titled Master of the Universe and published episodically on fan-fiction websites under the pen name "Snowqueen's Icedragon". The piece featured characters named after Stephenie Meyer's characters in Twilight, Edward Cullen and Bella Swan.

However, in 2003, a British law firm representing J. K. Rowling and Warner Bros. sent a letter to webmasters requesting that adult Harry Potter fan fiction ("stories containing graphically violent and sexual content") be removed from a prominent fan fiction website, citing concerns that children might stumble upon the illicit content. In response, the webmasters from several websites hosting adult Harry Potter fan fiction, among other types of fan fiction, "made claims of 'fair use' and nonprofessional status" to justify their right to continue hosting the adult content.

As an example of changing views on the subject, author Orson Scott Card (best known for the Ender's Game series) once stated on his website, "to write fiction using my characters is morally identical to moving into my house without invitation and throwing out my family." He changed his mind completely and since has assisted fan fiction contests, arguing to the Wall Street Journal that "Every piece of fan fiction is an ad for my book. What kind of idiot would I be to want that to disappear?"

However, Anne Rice consistently and aggressively prevented fan fiction based on any of her fictional characters (mostly those from her famous Interview with the Vampire and its sequels in The Vampire Chronicles). While Rice would later develop a milder "live and let live" stance in regards to these works, she, along with Anne McCaffrey (whose stance has been changed by her son, Todd McCaffrey, since her death) and Raymond Feist, asked to have any fiction related to their series removed from FanFiction.Net. George R. R. Martin is also strongly opposed to fan fiction, believing it to be copyright infringement and a bad exercise for aspiring writers. Sharon Lee and Steve Miller, creators of the Liaden universe, strongly oppose fan fiction written in their universe, with Lee saying that "Nobody else is going to get it right. This may sound rude and elitist, but honestly, it's not easy for us to get it right sometimes, and we've been living with these characters ... for a very long time."

== See also ==
- Canon (fiction)
- Collaborative fiction
- Continuation novel
- Database consumption
- Fan art
- Fandom
- Omegaverse
- Parallel novel
- Pastiche
- Revisionism (fictional)
- Apocrypha
- My Immortal – famous Harry Potter fan fiction
- My Little Pony: Friendship Is Magic fan fiction
