= Shane Paul McGhie =

American actor (born 1993)

- Born: November 26, 1993 (age 32); Los Angeles, California, U.S.

Shane Paul McGhie (born November 26, 1993) is an American film and television actor. He is known for his role as Deputy Joseph Harris in Entertainment One's crime drama television series Deputy.

== Early life ==
McGhie was born in Los Angeles, California, to Jamaican parents. He attended Beverly Hills High School where he studied in the Theatre Arts department of the school. While in school, McGhie was also said to have received classical vocal training in Madrigals. In June 2011, after his graduation from high school, he attended California State University, Northridge for one year while pursuing his acting career. After a year in the institution, McGhie transferred to the University of Southern California where he eventually graduated with a BFA in Acting in 2016.

== Career ==
In 2017, McGhie landed a role in CBS's crime drama series Criminal Minds where he played a minor role in season 13 as Hunter. The same year, he was given another minor role in Shameless. In 2018, he played a recurring role in Sacred Lies as Jude Leland. In 2019, he played a role as Jamal Barry in BET Films comedy drama What Men Want alongside Taraji P. Henson, Aldis Hodge, Erykah Badu and Tracy Morgan. In 2019, he was featured in the film After as Landon, reprising the role in the 2020 sequel After We Collided. In 2023, he guest starred in the third episode of Rian Johnson's TV series, Poker Face starring Natasha Lyonne.

== Filmography ==
=== Film ===
Year	Title	Role	Notes
2015	Victor	Spike	
2019	What Men Want	Jamal Barry	
2019	American Skin	Jordin King	
2019	Foster Boy	Jamal Randolph	
2019	After	Landon Gibson	
2020	After We Collided	Landon Gibson	
2020	The Last Shift	Jevon	
2023	Fool's Paradise	Intern	
2026	Do Not Enter	Vernon	Post-production

=== Television ===
Year	Title	Role	Notes
2017	Rebel	Carlton Silver	Episode: "Partners"
2017	Criminal Minds	Hunter	Episode: "Lucky Strikes"
2017	Shameless	Jude Toussaint	Episode: "The (Mis)Education of Liam Fergus Beircheart Gallagher"
2018	Sacred Lies	Jude Leland	4 episodes
2019	Unbelievable	Connor	Miniseries; 3 episodes
2019	Dolly Parton's Heartstrings	Lincoln Dollarhyde	Episode: "Down from Dover"
2019–2020	Greenleaf	Dante	7 episodes
2020	Amazing Stories	Lee Easton	Episode: "The Heat"
2020	Deputy	Deputy Joseph Harris	13 episodes
2020	A Teacher	Shawn	Miniseries
2021	Calls	Lou (voice)	Episode: "The Universe Did It"
2023	Poker Face	Austin / Hanky T. Pickens	Episode: "The Stall"
2024	Genius	Sanford	Episode: "MLK/X: Graduation"
2024	Grey's Anatomy	Eddie Oliver	Episode: "Never Felt So Alone"
2026	Abbott Elementary	Jonathan Pierce	Episode: "Trip"
