= Chance Perdomo =

American and British actor (1996–2024)

- Publicity photo of Chance Perdomo
- Born: 20 October 1996; Los Angeles, California, U.S.
- Died: c. 29 March 2024 (aged 27); Upstate New York, U.S.
- Occupation: Actor
- Years active: 2016–2024

Chance Perdomo (20 October 1996 – c. 29 March 2024) was an American and British actor. He earned a British Academy Television Award nomination for his performance in the BBC Three film Killed by My Debt (2018). He gained further prominence through his roles as Ambrose Spellman in the Netflix series Chilling Adventures of Sabrina (2018–2020) and Andre Anderson in the first season of the Amazon Prime Video series Gen V (2023). He also appeared in the films After We Fell (2021), After Ever Happy (2022), and After Everything (2023). He died from injuries sustained in a motorcycle accident while travelling to begin filming for Gen V's second season.

== Early life and education ==
Perdomo was born in Los Angeles, California, on 20 October 1996. He moved to Southampton in the county of Hampshire, England, as a child and was brought up there by his mother and stepfather. Perdomo held both British and American citizenship, and had Latino heritage, including Guatemala and Dominican Republic on his mother's side.

Perdomo attended the local Redbridge Community School, where he served as head boy and discovered theatre. He then went to Peter Symonds College in Winchester, where he was elected president of the sixth form's student union. Perdomo intended to study law after graduating but decided to pursue acting instead, moving, with money he made working in a shoe shop and at a cinema, to London. He joined the National Youth Theatre and trained at Identity School of Acting.

== Career ==
Perdomo made his television debut with a recurring role as Henry Goodall in the third series of the CBBC adaptation of Hetty Feather, which aired in 2017. This was followed by a lead role as Jerome in the 2018 BBC Three drama film Killed by My Debt. For his performance, Perdomo was nominated for the British Academy Television Award for Best Actor.

In February 2018, it was announced that Perdomo was cast in the series regular role of Ambrose Spellman on the Netflix series Chilling Adventures of Sabrina. Reports revealed that Perdomo previously auditioned for the role of Jughead Jones on Riverdale, but the role was given to Cole Sprouse. Perdomo, however, impressed series creator Roberto Aguirre-Sacasa with his audition so much that the latter wrote the role of Sabrina's Ambrose with the actor in mind.

In 2019, Perdomo was named a Screen International Star of Tomorrow and a BAFTA Breakthrough Brit.

Perdomo made his feature film debut as Landon Gibson in After We Fell (2021), the third installment of the After film series. He would reprise his role as Landon in the subsequent two films in the series, After Ever Happy (2022) and After Everything (2023). He voiced Snork in the third season of Finnish television series Moominvalley. His final feature film appearance was in Bad Man.

For his final television role, Perdomo starred as Andre Anderson in Gen V, a 2023 spinoff of the superhero series The Boys. After his death, production of the second season was delayed.

== Death ==
Perdomo died in a motorcycle crash at the age of 27. It is believed the accident occurred late on 29 March or early 30 March 2024 while Perdomo was travelling through upstate New York en route to Toronto to begin filming for the second season of Gen V. Out of respect for Perdomo, his character of Andre Anderson was not recast and the second season was rewritten.

== Filmography ==
=== Film ===
Year	Title	Role	Notes
2016	Longfield Drive	Rodell	Short film
2017	The Importance of Skin	Ryan	Short film
2021	After We Fell	Landon Gibson	
2022	After Ever Happy	Landon Gibson	
2023	After Everything	Landon Gibson	
2025	Bad Man	DJ	Posthumous release; final film role; dedicated in memory

=== Television ===
Year	Title	Role	Notes
2017	Hetty Feather	Henry Goodall	Recurring role
2018	Shakespeare & Hathaway: Private Investigators	Hamish Kingly	Episode: "The Chameleon's Dish"
2018	Killed by My Debt	Jerome Rogers	Nominated for BAFTA for Best Actor in a Leading Role
2018	Midsomer Murders	Leo Scott	Episode: "Death of the Small Coppers"
2018–2020	Chilling Adventures of Sabrina	Ambrose Spellman	Main cast
2022	Moominvalley	Snork	Season 3
2023	Gen V	Andre Anderson	Main cast; season 1

=== Podcast ===
Year	Title	Role	Notes
2020	The Cipher	Benny	Main cast
