= Hero Fiennes Tiffin =

British actor and producer (born 1997)

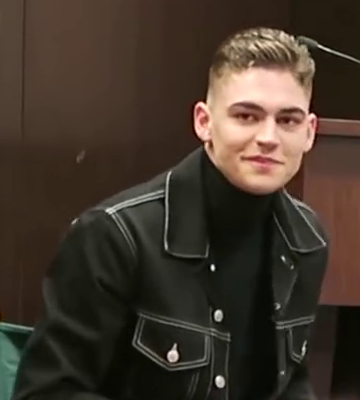
- Fiennes Tiffin in 2019
- Born: Hero Beauregard Faulkner Fiennes Tiffin; 6 November 1997 (age 28); London, England
- Occupations: Actor; model; film producer
- Years active: 2008–present
- Mother: Martha Fiennes
- Relatives: Maurice Fiennes (great-grandfather); Mark Fiennes (maternal grandfather); Jennifer Lash (maternal grandmother); Ralph Fiennes (maternal uncle); Joseph Fiennes (maternal uncle)
- Family: Twisleton-Wykeham-Fiennes family

Hero Beauregard Faulkner Fiennes Tiffin (/faɪnz/; born 6 November 1997) is an English actor and film producer. First gaining recognition as the young Tom Riddle in Harry Potter and the Half-Blood Prince (2009), he is most known for his starring roles as Hardin Scott in the After film series (2019–2023), and Sherlock Holmes in the Amazon Prime Video series Young Sherlock (2026–present).

== Early life and work ==
Hero Fiennes Tiffin was born in London on 6 November 1997, the son of film director Martha Fiennes and cinematographer George Tiffin. He has two siblings. He does not hyphenate his name because his parents were never married. He was educated at Reay Primary School in Lambeth, Emanuel School in Battersea, and Graveney School in Tooting.

He is a member of the Twisleton-Wykeham-Fiennes family; his great-grandfather was Maurice Fiennes, and his maternal uncles are actors Ralph and Joseph Fiennes. His maternal grandparents were photographer Mark Fiennes and novelist Jennifer Lash. Prior to his acting career, Fiennes Tiffin worked as a landscaper and caterer.

Fiennes Tiffin made his first film appearance as Spartak in the 2008 drama film Bigga than Ben. He was subsequently cast as 11 year-old Tom Riddle in Harry Potter and the Half-Blood Prince, out of thousands of young actors who auditioned for the role. Although at least one publication alleged that his family connections alone helped him get the part, director David Yates said he was cast due to his ability to find 'the darker space' in his line readings, and that he did not get the role solely due to his relation to Ralph Fiennes, his uncle, who played Lord Voldemort. However, Yates did admit that the family resemblance was a "clincher". Yates described Fiennes Tiffin as "very focussed and disciplined". He said Fiennes Tiffin "got the corners and dark moods and odd spirit of the character", as well as having a "wonderful haunted quality that seemed to bring Tom Riddle alive on-screen for us".

== Career ==
Following Harry Potter, Fiennes Tiffin appeared in British television roles in Private Peaceful (2012) and Safe (2018), as well as a short independent film called Possession with Intent to Supply (2016). In 2019, Fiennes Tiffin was cast in the lead role of Hardin Scott in the film After. The film's success led to four sequels: After We Collided (2020), After We Fell (2021), After Ever Happy (2022), and After Everything (2023), in which Fiennes Tiffin reprised his role as Hardin Scott. The last three films were filmed simultaneously in Bulgaria in late 2020, due to the COVID-19 pandemic. Fiennes Tiffin also played Brooks Gustafson in the action-thriller film The Silencing (2020), Jim Albright in the romantic drama First Love (2022), Santo Ferreira in the historical drama starring Viola Davis entitled The Woman King (2023), Henry Hayes in The Ministry of Ungentlemanly Warfare (2024), and Charlie in Picture This (2025). In 2026 he starred alongside his uncle Joseph Fiennes as a teenaged Sherlock Holmes in the Prime Video series Young Sherlock, directed by Guy Ritchie.

In addition to acting, Fiennes Tiffin has modelled for Dolce & Gabbana, Dior, H&M, Hugo Boss, Fendi, Oliver Peoples, Superdry, Ferragamo, and David Yurman.

His upcoming projects include The Climb, a film based on the 2013 Greenpeace protest where activists illegally scaled The Shard in London in protest against Arctic oil drilling, Mr. Smith, a thriller in which Fiennes Tiffin's character returns to an Irish port to solve his brother's sadistic murder (written and directed by Declan O'Dwyer), Above the Below, a thriller where Fiennes Tiffin plays an idealistic astronaut on a mission of survival following a botched re-entry to earth (starring opposite Idris Elba who plays the mission's commander), and Making Noise.

== Personal life ==
Fiennes Tiffin is a football fan and supports West Ham United F.C.

Fiennes Tiffin with West Ham United ended the Club's The Soccer Tournament (TST) campaign on a high with victory over Culture by Mo Ali FC in 2023. Hero, with other celebrities, played golf in a Charity Pro-Am at the BMW PGA Championship in September 2025.

Fiennes Tiffin has played football in the Sellebrity Soccer Charity Match several times: May 2024, April 2025, and October 2025.

== Filmography ==
Film roles
Year	Title	Role	Notes	Ref.
2008	Bigga than Ben	Spartak	Credited as Hero Fiennes-Tiffin	
2009	Harry Potter and the Half-Blood Prince	11-year-old Tom Riddle		
2012	Private Peaceful	Young Charlie	Credited as Hero Fiennes-Tiffin	
2019	After	Hardin Scott		
2020	The Silencing	Brooks Gustafson		
2020	After We Collided	Hardin Scott		
2021	After We Fell	Hardin Scott	Also producer	
2022	After Ever Happy	Hardin Scott	Also producer	
2022	The Woman King	Santo Ferreira		
2022	First Love	Jim Albright		
2022	The Loneliest Boy in the World	Mitch / Zombie		
2023	After Everything	Hardin Scott	Also producer	
2024	The Ministry of Ungentlemanly Warfare	Henry Hayes		
2024	Beyond After	Himself	Documentary	
2025	Picture This	Charlie		
2026	Above the Below	Rhodes	Post-production	

Audiobook and podcast roles
Year	Title	Role	Notes
2019	After	Hardin Scott	Chapter 98, "The Bet"
2020	Day by Day	Sam	Episode: "Big Nights In"
2020	Shoemaker of Dreams	Narrator	Chapter 13
2026	Time to Walk by Apple Fitness	Himself	

Television roles
Year	Title	Role	Notes	Ref.
2018	Safe	Ioan Fuller	8 episodes	
2018	The Tunnel	Leo	1 episode	
2019	Cleaning Up	Jake	5 episodes	
2023	Soccer AM	Himself	1 episode	
2026	Young Sherlock	Sherlock Holmes	8 episodes	

== Awards and nominations ==
Year	Awards	Category	Title	Result	Ref.
2019	Teen Choice Awards	Choice Drama Movie Actor	After	Won	
2019	Ischia Global Film & Music Festival	Rising Star	Himself	Won	
2019	Just Jared Awards	Favorite Actor of 2019		Runner-up	
2022	Just Jared Awards	Favorite Actor of 2022		Won	
2025	Saturn Awards	Best Action/Adventure Film	The Ministry of Ungentlemanly Warfare	Nominated	
