= Rob Estes =

American actor (born 1963)

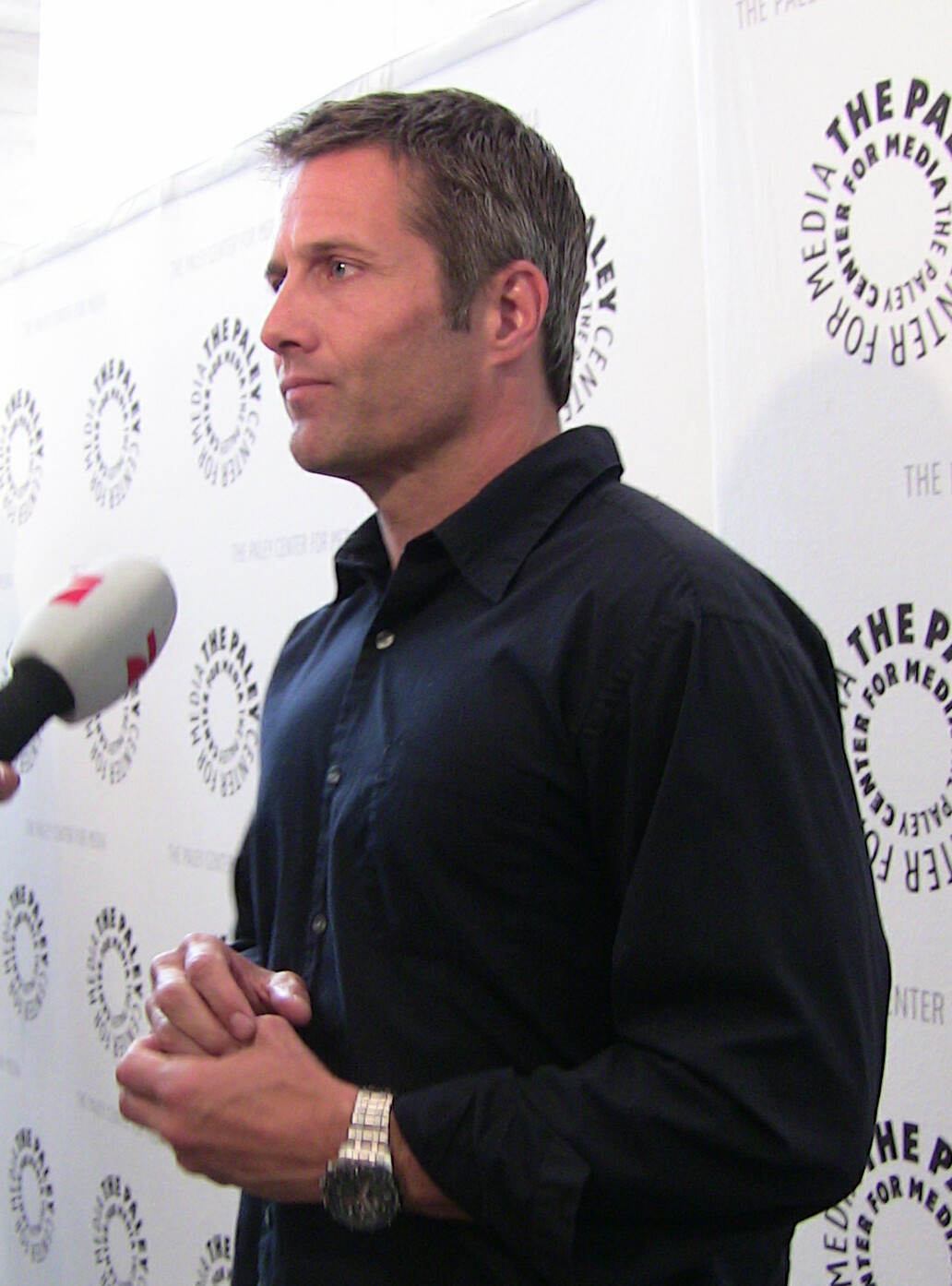
- Estes in 2009
- Born: July 22, 1963 (age 63); Norfolk, Virginia, United States
- Occupation: Actor
- Years active: 1986–present
- Spouses: Josie Bissett (m. 1992, divorced) (until c. 2006) Erin Bolte (m. 2010)
- Children: 3

Rob Estes (born July 22, 1963) is an American actor. He is known for his roles as Harry Wilson on the teen drama series 90210, as Sgt. Chris Lorenzo on the crime drama series Silk Stalkings, and as Kyle McBride on the primetime soap opera Melrose Place.

== Career ==
Estes first became interested in acting while training to be a stunt double. One of his first acting jobs was playing Glenn Gallagher in the Days of Our Lives (1986–1987). He later gained widespread recognition for his role as Sergeant Chris Lorenzo in Silk Stalkings (1991–1995), half of the "dynamic duo" alongside Mitzi Kapture.

In 1993, Estes had a guest role on the prime time Fox soap opera Melrose Place, playing Sam Towler. Three years later, the series' producers brought him back but cast him in a different role, restaurateur Kyle McBride. Estes played the role from 1996 to the series' cancellation in 1999.

Following Melrose Place, he had guest starring roles on Providence, Suddenly Susan, Law & Order: Special Victims Unit and Gilmore Girls. He also performed in theater, and had roles in Same Time, Next Year (2004) and The Lake (2005).

Estes starred in the comedy film I Do, They Don't (previously titled Blended), which premiered on ABC Family in March 2005 and starred his Melrose Place co-star and then-wife Josie Bissett. He returned to series television playing Sean Cole in the ABC television crime drama The Evidence.

He completed a recurring role on CSI: Miami as Nick Townsend, the abusive ex-husband of Natalia Boa Vista. In a January 2007 episode, he was murdered by the husband of a killer to cover up her crime.

Estes then portrayed Lieutenant Tom Hogan, Inspector Lindsay Boxer's ex-husband and current boss in the ABC police procedural and legal drama Women's Murder Club.

In May 2008, Estes was cast as Harry Wilson in 90210 on The CW. Like Melrose Place before it, the series is a spin-off from the original 1990s series Beverly Hills, 90210, marking Estes' third appearance in the franchise.

On January 20, 2010, Estes announced that the second season of 90210 would be his last. "This is my final season on 90210, and I wish the show, cast and crew nothing but the best. I am looking forward to spending time with my kids and exploring other opportunities", Estes said in a statement.

== Personal life ==
On May 1, 1992, Estes married actress Josie Bissett, another cast member of Melrose Place. In 2005, they separated, with Estes reportedly moving out of their Seattle home at his wife's request. The couple have two children, son Mason (born 1999/2000) and daughter Maya (born 2002/2003). In January 2006, the couple announced their plans to divorce.

On June 15, 2010, after a few years living together, Estes married teacher and surfer Erin Bolte. As of 2017, after repeated moves, including return stays, between Santa Monica, Seattle and San Clemente, Estes and his wife had settled in San Clemente with Mason and their child, son Makai (born 2011).

== Filmography ==
=== Film ===
Year	Title	Role	Notes
1987	Uninvited	Corey	Direct-to-video
1989	Phantom of the Mall: Eric's Revenge	Peter Baldwin	
1989	Trapper Country War	Ryan Cassidy	
1992	Aces: Iron Eagle III	Doyle	
2000	Nostradamus	Michael Nostrand	
2006	How to Go Out on a Date in Queens	Artie	
2012	Hello Herman	Chet Clarkson	
2019	I'll Be Watching	Detective Mark Paine	
2020	After We Collided	Ken Scott	
2021	After We Fell	Ken Scott	
2022	After Ever Happy	Ken Scott	
2023	Beautiful Disaster	Benny	
2023	See You on Venus	Kyle's father	
2023	After Everything	Ken Scott	
2024	Beautiful Wedding	Benny	

=== Television ===
Year	Title	Role	Notes
1986	CBS Schoolbreak Special	Billy	Episode: "Have You Tried Talking to Patty?"
1986–1987	Days of Our Lives	Glenn Gallagher	Recurring role
1987	Student Exchange	Beach	TV movie
1988	Simon & Simon	John Channing	Episode: "First, Let's Kill All the Lawyers"
1988	Perfect People	Monty	TV movie
1989	Thunderboat Row		TV movie
1989	Heartland	Brian	Episode: "Gus Sees a Dead Guy"
1989	21 Jump Street	Darryl	Episode: "Say It Ain't So, Pete"
1989	The Young Riders	Curly	Episode: "A Good Day to Die"
1990	Checkered Flag	Mike Reardon	TV movie
1991	Zorro	Monty	Episode: "The New Zorro"
1991–1995	Silk Stalkings	Sgt. Chris Lorenzo	Main cast (seasons 1–5)
1992	Lady Against the Odds	Martin Anderson	TV movie
1993	Melrose Place	Sam Towler	2 episodes
1994	Come Die with Me: A Mickey Spillane's Mike Hammer Mystery	Mike Hammer	TV movie
1996	Sweet Temptation	Billy Stone	TV movie
1996	A Loss of Innocence	Erik Eriksen	TV movie
1996–1999	Melrose Place	Kyle McBride	Main cast (seasons 5–7)
1997	Close to Danger	Adam	TV movie
1998	Terror in the Mall	Glen Savoy	TV movie
1999–2000	Suddenly Susan	Oliver Browne	Main cast (season 4)
2000	Providence	John Hemming	Recurring role (season 3)
2000	The Man Who Used to Be Me	Sam (younger)	TV movie
2002	Counterstrike	ATF Special Agent Thomas Kellogg	TV movie
2002	The Twilight Zone	Scott Turner	Episode: "Sanctuary"
2003	Law & Order: Special Victims Unit	Dan Hoffman	Episode: "Desperate"
2003	Gilmore Girls	Jimmy	2 episodes
2005	I Do, They Don't	Jim Barber	TV movie
2006	The Evidence	Sean Cole	Main cast
2006–2007	CSI: Miami	Nick Townsend	4 episodes
2007–2008	Women's Murder Club	Tom Hogan	Main cast
2008–2010	90210	Harry Wilson	Main cast (seasons 1–2)
2011	Edge of the Garden	Brian Connor	TV movie
2012	Psych	Jordon Beaumont	Episode: "Santabarbaratown"
2012	Necessary Roughness	Rob Maroney	Recurring role (season 2)
2012	Tailor Made Murder	Randy Williams	TV movie
2014	Signed, Sealed, Delivered for Christmas	Jordan Marley	TV movie
2014	Castle	Julian Bruckner	Episode: "Dressed to Kill"
2015	CSI: Crime Scene Investigation	Tod Spanna	Episode: "Merchants of Menace"
2015	CSI: Cyber	Julian Perkins	Episode: "iWitness"
2017	Major Crimes	Clark Farman	Episode: "Heart Failure"
2017	Daytime Divas	Vance Gordan	4 episodes
2017	The Night Shift	Colonel Parnell	2 episodes
2018	Famous in Love	Steve	4 episodes
2019	When Calls the Heart	Theodore Richardson	Episode: "Heart on My Sleeve"
