= Josephine Langford =

Australian actress (born 1997)

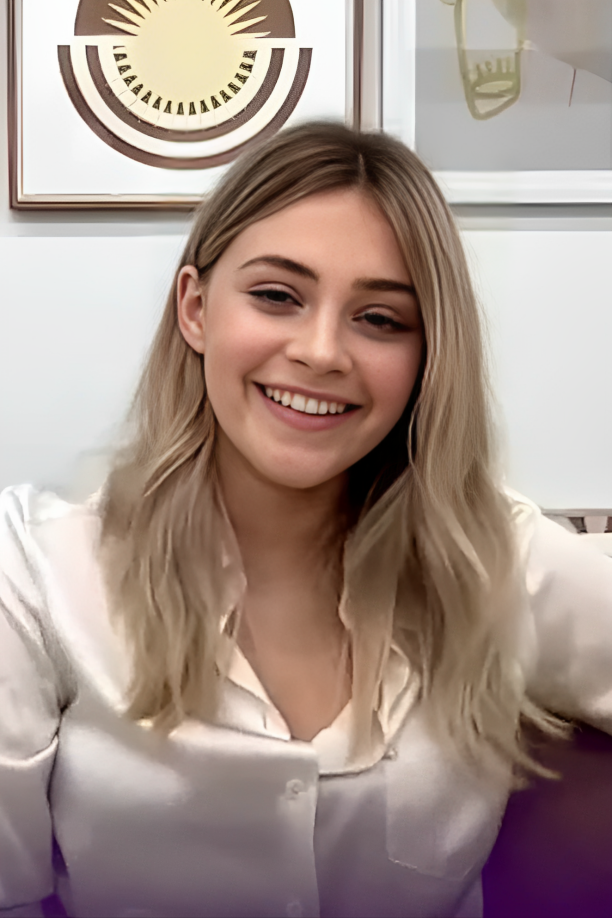
- Langford in September 2021
- Born: Josephine Eliza Langford; 18 August 1997 (age 29); Perth, Australia
- Occupation: Actress
- Years active: 2007–present
- Relatives: Katherine Langford (sister)

Josephine Eliza Langford (born 18 August 1997) is an Australian actress best known for her starring role as Tessa Young in the After film series. She also portrayed Emma Cunningham in the Netflix film Moxie. She also played Zoey Miller in the Amazon Prime Video romcom The Other Zoey and Katy Gibson in Gigi & Nate.

== Early life ==
Langford was born in Perth, Western Australia, and raised in Applecross, a riverside suburb of Perth. She is the youngest daughter of Stephen Langford, a flying doctor and the director of medical services at the Royal Flying Doctor Service Western Operations, and Elizabeth Green, a pediatrician. Her older sister Katherine is also an actress known for starring in the 2017 Netflix series 13 Reasons Why.

As a child, Langford became interested in music and played the saxophone, the violin, and the piano. She's also played cricket in her childhood. In 2008, at the age of 10, Langford wrote and performed a song called "Shadows" for a music competition, which won her the "Song of the Year" title. She also wrote two more songs, "Lonely" (2007) and "Sea Shanty" (2008) with fellow young composer Kristina Lang.

== Career ==
Langford started taking acting classes at the age of 13. In 2012, she began taking acting classes at Perth Film School. At the age of 14, she began appearing in several short films such as Sex Ed (2013), When Separating (2013), and Gypsy Blood (2014). She made her screen debut in the indie film Pulse (2017), which screened at film festivals. She also starred as a supporting actress the same year on the American horror film Wish Upon, acting alongside Joey King. She also made her television debut in 2017 on the Australian series Wolf Creek.

In July 2018, Langford was cast as Tessa Young in the film After, based on the 2014 new adult fiction novel of the same name written by Anna Todd. The film premiered in 2019, and grossed $69.7 million worldwide. She won a Teen Choice Award for her role as Tessa. Josephine Langford reprised role in the sequel, After We Collided, which was released in September 2020. In 2019, Langford also appeared in the American horror anthology web television series Into the Dark as Clair. In November 2019, Langford was cast as Emma Cunningham in the Netflix film Moxie, which is based on the novel of the same name written by Jennifer Mathieu. The third and fourth installments in the After series, After We Fell and After Ever Happy were released in 2021 and 2022 respectively. The fifth and final film, After Everything, was released in 2023.

== Filmography ==
Film roles
Year	Title	Role	Notes
2017	Wish Upon	Darcie Chapman	
2019	After	Tessa Young	
2020	After We Collided	Tessa Young	
2021	Moxie	Emma Cunningham	
2021	After We Fell	Tessa Young	
2021	The Great Gatsby Live Read!	Jordan Baker	
2022	Gigi & Nate	Katy Gibson	
2022	After Ever Happy	Tessa Young	
2023	After Everything	Tessa Young	
2023	The Other Zoey	Zoey Miller	
2024	Beyond After	Herself	Documentary

Television roles
Year	Title	Role	Notes
2017	Wolf Creek	Emma Webber	Episodes: "Journey", "Outback"
2019	Into the Dark	Clair Singer	Episode: "They Come Knocking"
2020	Day by Day	Lucy	Voice role; episode: "At the Peak of It All"
2020	Day by Day	Belle Williams	Voice role; episodes: "Class of 2020: Prom", "Class of 2020: Graduation"

== Awards and nominations ==
Year	Awards	Category	Nominated work	Result
2019	Teen Choice Awards	Choice Drama Movie Actress	After	Won
2021	Just Jared Awards	Favourite Actress of 2021	Herself	Won
2022	Just Jared Awards	Favourite Young Actress of 2022	Herself	Won
