= Austin North =

American actor (born 1996)

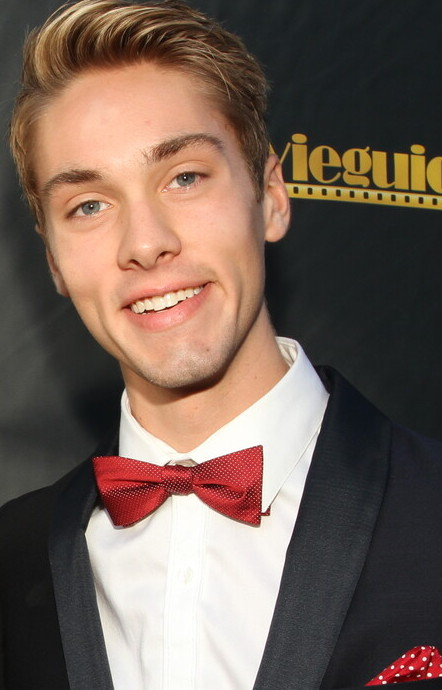
- North in early 2014
- Born: Austin Michael North; July 30, 1996 (age 30); Cincinnati, Ohio, U.S.
- Occupation: Actor
- Years active: 2011–present
- Notable work: Outer Banks; I Didn't Do It

Austin Michael North (born July 30, 1996) is an American actor. He has portrayed the roles of Logan Watson in the original Disney Channel sitcom I Didn't Do It (2014–2015) and Topper Thornton in the Netflix series Outer Banks (2020–2026).

== Early life ==
North was born in Cincinnati, Ohio. Later, he and his family relocated to Atlanta, Georgia.

== Career ==
At the age of fifteen, North began his professional acting career in 2011, when he appeared in several guest star roles in TV Series, including Kickin' It, General Hospital, A.N.T. Farm, Jessie and See Dad Run.

In 2014, North was cast to play the main role in the Disney Channel original series I Didn't Do It opposite Olivia Holt, Piper Curda, Peyton Clark and Sarah Gilman, in which he played the main role of Logan Watson.

In 2018, North was cast to play the main role in the teen comedy streaming series All Night, in which he played the main role of Oz, created by Jason Ubaldi that premiered on May 11, 2018, on Hulu.

In 2020, North was cast to play the main role in the teen drama Outer Banks opposite Chase Stokes, Madelyn Cline, Madison Bailey, Jonathan Daviss, Rudy Pankow and Drew Starkey, which he played the antagonist role as Topper, created by Josh Pate, Jonas Pate, and Shannon Burke that premiered on Netflix on April 15, 2020.

In 2023, North made his film debut in the romantic drama film Beautiful Disaster starring Dylan Sprouse and Virginia Gardner, based on Jamie McGuire's 2011 new adult novel of the same name, which was released on April 12, 2023, in which he played role of Shepley Maddox.

== Personal life ==
=== Relationships ===
In 2018, North dated reality television star Sadie Robertson from Duck Dynasty for four months. After Robertson broke up with North, she said, "We broke up. He's an amazing guy and I wish him all the best. We're friends. It just didn't work out. He actually just texted me the other day and said he was thinking about me and I think that's beautiful. That's how it should be."

=== Alleged assault and subsequent arrest ===
On 13 February 2024, North was arrested after he allegedly attacked Las Vegas Hospital employees. He allegedly assaulted several nurses and a phlebotomist after entering the emergency room. He was taken into custody and booked for gross misdemeanor battery and was subsequently released on bail.

On 15 February 2024, North addressed the incident on Instagram Story stating:

"I am deeply upset by the events that took place in Las Vegas this past week. My friend drove me to the hospital because I thought I was having a heart attack. Several tests were taken, including blood, which came back negative for any drugs or alcohol in my system. I was having a severe anxiety attack. I have very little memory of the events that day at the hospital. I have the utmost respect for healthcare workers and hospital staff. I have battled anxiety on and off for years and this was the most extreme panic attack I've ever had. Going forward, I hope to shed light on this debilitating disorder and send hope to those who have also struggled."

== Filmography ==
Film
Year	Title	Role	Notes
2023	Beautiful Disaster	Shepley Maddox	
2024	Beautiful Wedding	Shepley Maddox	
2024	One Fast Move	Cody	

Television
Year	Title	Role	Notes
2011	Kickin' It	Ricky Weaver	Episode: "Ricky Weaver"
2012	General Hospital	Bodhi	Uncredited
2012	A.N.T. Farm	Holland	Episode: "MutANT Farm II"
2013	See Dad Run	Dean	Episode: "See Dad Play Hard to Get"
2014–15	I Didn't Do It	Logan Watson	Main role; 39 episodes
2015	Jessie	Logan Watson	Special guest star; Episode: "The Ghostest with the Mostest"
2018	All Night	Oz	Main role; 4 episodes
2020–26	Outer Banks	Topper Thornton	Main role
