= Beautiful Disaster =

Beautiful Disaster may refer to:

== Music ==
- A Beautiful Disaster, an album by JellyRoll, 2020
- "Beautiful Disaster" (311 song), 1997
- "Beautiful Disaster" (Kelly Clarkson song), 2003
- "Beautiful Disaster", a song by American Hi-Fi from The Art of Losing, 2003
- "Beautiful Disaster", a song by Jon McLaughlin from Indiana, 2007
- "Beautiful Disaster", a song by Mika from No Place in Heaven, 2015
- "Beautiful Disaster", a song by Roxen, competing to represent Romania in the Eurovision Song Contest 2020

== Other uses ==
- Beautiful Disaster (film), a 2023 American romantic comedy
- Beautiful Disaster (novel), a 2012 novel by Jamie McGuire
- "A Beautiful Disaster" (Criminal Minds), a 2016 television episode
