= Young adult literature =

Literature written for adolescents and young adults

Young adult literature (YA) is literature written for readers aged 12 to 18. It may include themes found in adult fiction, such as family dysfunction, substance abuse, alcoholism, and sexuality.

The earliest known use of term young adult occurred in 1942. Librarians developed the category of young adult literature to help bridge the gap between children's literature and adult literature. According to a study conducted in 2023, 55% of young adult literature consumers were over 18 years of age. 78% of adult consumers purchased with the intent to read themselves. Of these adult buyers, 51% were between ages 30 and 44. This highlights the fact that readers of young adult literature are often adults.

== Definitions ==
According to author and academic Michael Cart, the term young adult literature "first found common usage in the late 1960s, in reference to realistic fiction that was set in the real (as opposed to imagined), contemporary world and addressed problems, issues, and life circumstances of interest to young readers aged approximately 12–18". However, "The term 'young adult literature' is inherently amorphous, for its constituent terms 'young adult' and 'literature' are dynamic, changing as culture and society — which provide their context — change", and "even those who study and teach it have not reached a consensus on a definition".

Victor Malo-Juvera and Crag Hill, in "The Young Adult Canon: A Literary Solar System", note that in 2019 there was no consensus on the definition of young adult literature and list a number of definitions, including:

- Books that readers aged 12 to 20 chose independently
- Literature written for young people aged 11 to 18 and books marked as "young adult" by a publisher
- Literature including a teenager who is the main character and who, as the center of the plot, engages in problems related to and relatable to the lives of teenagers
- Novels told by "a teen protagonist speaking from an adolescent point of view, with all the limitations of understanding that implies"

This provides an overall consensus in the literary world that the definition of young adult literature is unique to the author, reader, and publisher. There are common themes and tropes seen across young adult literary work that lead a piece to be classified as young adult literature as a general classification with some aspects that may fall into adult literature as well as children's literature.

== History ==
Librarians first defined this new category of fiction, in particular librarians from the New York Public Library. The NYPL's first annual Books for Young People list was sent in 1929 to schools and libraries across the country. Then "In 1944 [...] NYPL librarian Margaret Scoggin changed the name of her library journal column from 'Books for Older Boys and Girls' to 'Books for Young Adults', and the genre was christened with a name that has lasted to this day". Initially the YA genre "tended to feature the same" boy and girl love story. But in the 1960s the novels developed to more fully examining the lives of adolescents. Particularly noteworthy was S. E. Hinton's The Outsiders.

=== Pre-20th century ===
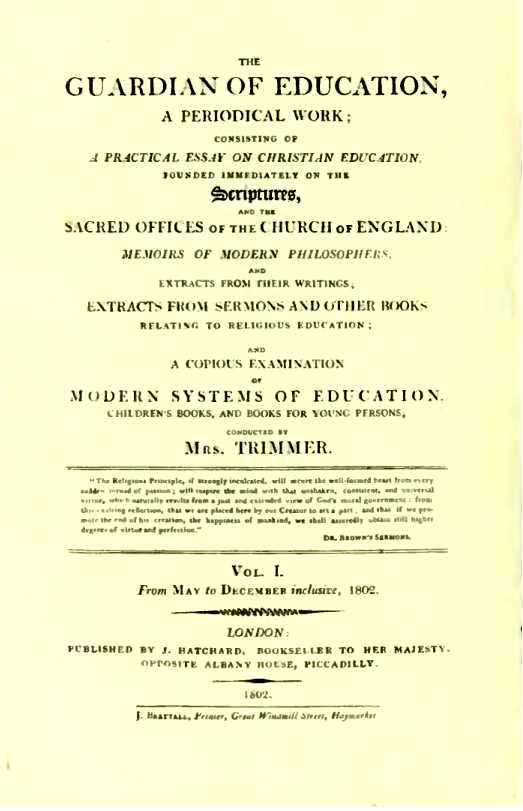
Title page from Sarah Trimmer's The Guardian of Education, vol. I, 1802

French historian Philippe Ariès argues, in his 1962 book Centuries of Childhood, that the modern concept of childhood only emerged in recent times. He argues that children were in the past not considered as greatly different from adults and were not given significantly different treatment. Furthermore, "Teenagers weren't a designated demographic in most respects until around World War II, due in part to advances in psychology and sociological changes, like the abolishment of child labor". With this development came the marketing of "clothes, music, films, radio programs, and ... the novel" for young adults.

On the other hand, Sarah Trimmer, in 1802, recognized young adults as a distinct age group, describing "young adulthood" as lasting from ages 14 to 21. In her children's literature periodical, The Guardian of Education, Trimmer introduced the terms "Books for Children" (for those under fourteen) and "Books for Young Persons" (for those between fourteen and twenty-one), establishing terms of reference for young adult literature that still remain in use.

"At the beginning of the eighteenth century", according to M. O. Grenby:

very few ... enjoyable books for children ... existed. Children read, certainly, but the books that they probably enjoyed reading (or hearing) most, were not designed especially for them. Fables were available, and fairy stories, lengthy chivalric romances, and short, affordable pamphlet tales and ballads called chapbooks, but these were published for children and adults alike. Take Nathaniel Crouch's Winter-Evenings Entertainments (1687). It contains riddles, pictures, and "pleasant and delightful relations of many rare and notable accidents and occurrences" which has suggested to some that it should be thought of as an early children's book. However, its title-page insists that it is "excellently accommodated to the fancies of old or young".

A number of works by eighteenth and nineteenth-century authors, though not written specifically for young readers, have appealed to them. Novels by Daniel Defoe, Jonathan Swift, Jane Austen, Walter Scott, Charles Dickens, Lewis Carroll, Robert Louis Stevenson, Mark Twain, Frances Hodgson Burnett, and Edith Nesbit.

Alice's Adventures in Wonderland by Lewis Carroll, published in 1865 and one of the best-known works of Victorian literature, has had widespread influence on popular culture and literature, especially in the fantasy genre. It is credited as helping end an era of didacticism in children's literature, inaugurating an era in which writing for children aimed to "delight or entertain". The tale has had a lasting popularity with adults as well as with children. It was inspired when, on 4 July 1862, Lewis Carroll and Reverend Robinson Duckworth rowed in a boat with the three young daughters of scholar Henry Liddell: Lorina (aged 13); Alice (aged 10); and Edith Mary (aged 8). During the trip Carroll told the girls a story that he described in his diary as "Alice's Adventures Under Ground" and which his journal says he "undertook to write out for Alice". She finally got the manuscript more than two years later. A shortened version for young children, The Nursery "Alice", was published in 1890.

A number of novels by Robert Louis Stevenson were first published in serial form, in a weekly children's literary magazine, Young Folks, including Treasure Island, Kidnapped, and The Black Arrow. This magazine was for boys and girls of an older age than many of its contemporaries.

Mark Twain's Tom Sawyer is described by publisher Simon & Schuster as "The classic tale of a young boy's adventures on the Mississippi in the nineteenth century". The same description can be applied to its sequel, Huckleberry Finn. The protagonist is an early adolescent who is navigating the hardships of society with an entertainment aspect of adventure that ties in history with literary merit.

=== 20th century ===
According to journalist Erin Blakemore, "Though young adult literature had existed since at least Laura Ingalls Wilder's Little House series, which was published in the 1930s, teachers and librarians were slow to accept books for adolescents as a genre".

In 1942, Seventeenth Summer – called by some the first young adult novel – by seventeen-year-old Maureen Daly, was published. Its themes were especially relevant to teenagers, underaged drinking, driving, dating, and angst. Another early example is the Heinlein juveniles, which were science fiction novels written by Robert A. Heinlein for Scribner's young-adult line, beginning with Rocket Ship Galileo in 1947. Scribner's published eleven more between 1947 and 1958, but the thirteenth, Starship Troopers, was instead published by Putnam. The intended market was teenaged boys. A fourteenth novel, Podkayne of Mars (1963), featured a teenaged girl as the protagonist.

In the 1950s, The Catcher in the Rye (1951) attracted the attention of the adolescent readers although it was written for adults. The themes of adolescent angst and alienation in the novel have become synonymous with young adult literature.

The Hobbit (1937) and The Lord of the Rings (1954–5) by J. R. R. Tolkien are highly successful fantasy novels selling over 150 million copies by 2007. Often read to young children and read by both children and adults, they are found in the teen or young adult section of American public libraries.

A Wrinkle in Time, written by Madeleine L'Engle in 1960, received over twenty-six rejections before publication in 1962, because it was, in L'Engle's words, "too different", and "because it deals overtly with the problem of evil, and it was really difficult for children, and was it a children's or an adults' book, anyhow?"

In 1957 the Young Adult Library Services Association – initially called the Young Adult Services Division following a reorganization of the American Library Association – had been created. YALSA evaluates and selects materials for young adults, with the most active YALSA committee being the book selection committee.

Michael Cart argues that the 1960s was the decade when literature for adolescents "could be said to have come into its own". A significant early example of young adult fiction was S. E. Hinton's The Outsiders (1967). The novel features a truer, darker side of adolescent life that was not often represented in works of fiction of the time. Written during high school and written when Hinton was only 16, The Outsiders also lacked the nostalgic tone common in books about adolescents written by adults. The Outsiders remains one of the best-selling young adult novels of all time. In the late 1960s and early 1970s, five other very popular books were published: I Know Why the Caged Bird Sings (1969), an autobiography of the early years of American poet Maya Angelou; The Friends (1973) by Rosa Guy; the semi-autobiographical The Bell Jar (US 1963, under a pseudonym; UK 1967) by poet Sylvia Plath; Bless the Beasts and Children (1970) by Glendon Swarthout; and Deathwatch (1972) by Robb White, which was awarded 1973 Edgar Award for Best Juvenile Mystery by the Mystery Writers of America. The works of Angelou and Plath were published as adult works but The Bell Jar deals with a nineteen year old's "teenage angst", and Angelou's autobiography is one of the ten books most frequently banned from high school and junior high school libraries and classrooms.

Authors Philip Pullman and Neil Gaiman have both argued for the importance of British fantasy writer Alan Garner. According to Pullman Garner "is indisputably the great originator, the most important British writer of fantasy since Tolkien, and in many respects better than Tolkien". Similarly Ursula K. Le Guin, in a review praising Garner's novel Red Shift, argued that "Some of the most interesting English novels of recent years have been published as children's books". Although Garner's early work is often labelled "children's literature", Garner himself rejects such a description. Critic Neil Philip, commenting on Garner's early novels, notes that "It may be that Garner's is a case" where the division between children's and adults' literature is "meaningless".

Judy Blume author of Are You There God? It's Me, Margaret. (1970), has significantly contributed to children's and young adult literature. She was one of the first young adult authors to write novels focused on such controversial topics as masturbation, menstruation, teen sex, birth control, and death.

Ursula K. Le Guin's A Wizard of Earthsea, published in 1968, had a significant influence on YA fantasy fiction. It won or contributed to several notable awards for Le Guin, including the Boston Globe–Horn Book Award in 1969, and was one of the last winners of the Lewis Carroll Shelf Award. With regard to the Earthsea series Barbara Bucknal stated that "Le Guin was not writing for young children when she wrote these fantasies, nor yet for adults. She was writing for 'older kids'. But in fact she can be read, like Tolkien, by ten-year-olds and by adults. Margaret Atwood said that ... A Wizard of Earthsea ... since it dealt with themes such as "life and mortality and who are we as human beings", it could be read and enjoyed by anybody older than twelve. Reviewers have commented that the basic premise of A Wizard of Earthsea, that of a talented boy going to a wizard's school and making an enemy with whom he has a close connection, is also the premise of Harry Potter.

As publishers began to focus on the emerging adolescent market, more booksellers and libraries began creating young adult sections distinct from children's literature and novels written for adults. The 1970s to the mid-1980s have been described as the golden age of young-adult fiction, when challenging novels began speaking directly to the interests of the identified adolescent market.

In the 1980s, young adult literature began pushing the envelope in terms of the subject matter that was considered appropriate for their audience: Books dealing with topics such as rape, suicide, parental death, and murder which had previously been deemed taboo, saw significant critical and commercial success. A flip-side of this trend was a strong revived interest in the romance novel, including young adult romance. With an increase in number of adolescents, the genre "matured, blossomed, and came into its own, with the better written, more serious, and more varied young adult books (than those) published during the last two decades".

The first novel in J.K. Rowling's seven-book Harry Potter series, Harry Potter and the Philosopher's Stone, was published in 1997. Originally marketed in the UK under the broad category of children's literature, the books received attention and praise for their increasingly mature and sophisticated nature, eventually garnering a significant audience of adult readers. This phenomenon led many to see Harry Potter and J.K. Rowling as responsible for a resurgence of young adult literature. The books "kickstarted a YA novel-to-blockbuster-movie boom and waved in an era of speculative fiction". The end of the decade saw a number of awards appear such as the Michael L. Printz Award and Alex Awards, designed to recognize excellence in writing for young adult audiences.

Philip Pullman's fantasy trilogy His Dark Materials, published between 1995 and 2000, added another controversial topic to the field by attacking established religion, especially Roman Catholicism. Northern Lights, the first volume in the trilogy, won the 1995 Carnegie Medal as the year's outstanding English-language children's book. Pullman has written other YA fiction, including the Sally Lockhart series (1985–94), as well as books for younger children.

=== 21st century ===
The early 2000s saw young adult fiction diversify into various speculative fiction subgenres. Paranormal romance became a trend with the publication of the Twilight series by Stephenie Meyer, as did the love triangle. The emergence of dystopian young adult novels was seen with the publication of The Hunger Games trilogy by Suzanne Collins, The Maze Runner, and Divergent.

It has continued to expand into other media and genres: graphic novels/manga, light novels, fantasy, mystery fiction, romance novels, and even subcategories such as cyberpunk, techno-thrillers, and contemporary Christian fiction. There was also "a YA novel-to-blockbuster-movie boom" beginning with the 2001 adaptation of Harry Potter and the Philosopher's Stone.

A survey of attendees at a 2018 conference of educators found that the most frequently taught YA texts in America from 2013 to 2018, ordered from most to least taught, were Speak, The Absolutely True Diary of a Part-Time Indian, The Giver, The Outsiders, The House on Mango Street, American Born Chinese, Monster, The Book Thief, Persepolis, and The Perks of Being a Wallflower.

== Themes ==
Many young adult novels feature coming-of-age stories. These feature adolescents beginning to transform into adults, working through personal problems, and learning to take responsibility for their actions. YA serves many literary purposes. It provides a pleasurable reading experience for young people, emphasizing real-life experiences and problems in easier-to-grasp ways, and depicts societal functions.

An analysis of YA novels between 1980 and 2000 found seventeen expansive literary themes. The most common of these were friendship, getting into trouble, romantic and sexual interest, and family life. Other common thematic elements revolve around the coming-of-age nature of the texts. This includes narratives about self-identity, life and death, and individuality.

Young adult novels do not always end with a "happy ever after" compared to that of children's literature. As authors develop their literary work to target young adult ages, readers who are entering adulthood are introduced to the idea that things do not always end how they would like them to. Being introduced to this idea at a younger age can allow for young adults to be comfortable and adept to possible upcoming obstacles and hardships in their future.

== Genre ==
Some of the most common YA genres are dystopian, contemporary fiction, fantasy, science fiction, historical fiction, and romance. Hybrid genres are also common in YA.

=== Common genres ===
==== Social problem novels ====
The social problem novel or problem novel is a sub-genre of literature focusing and commenting on overarching social problems including gender, race, or class. This type of novel is usually seen as originating in the 19th century, though there were precursors in the 18th century, like Amelia by Henry Fielding (1751), and Caleb Williams (1794) by William Godwin. They are typically a type of realistic fiction that characteristically depict, in the YA version of this genre, issues such as poverty, drugs, and pregnancy. Published in 1967, S.E. Hinton's The Outsiders is a well-known example of the YA problem novel. Following its publication, problem novels became popular during the 1970s.

Librarian Sheila Egoff described three reasons why problem novels resonate with adolescents:

- They depict real situations that the readers are experiencing so they have "therapeutic value".
- They are interesting, new and foreign to those not experiencing these issues.
- They feature mature story lines which appeal to a child's desire to grow up.

A classic example of a problem novel, and one that defined the sub-genre, is Go Ask Alice anonymously published by Beatrice Sparks in 1971. Go Ask Alice is written as the diary of a young girl, who, to cope with her many problems, experiments with drugs. More recent examples include Speak by Laurie Halse Anderson, Crank by Ellen Hopkins, and The Perks of Being a Wallflower by Stephen Chbosky.

==== Dystopian ====
In the more recent years young adult literature has shifted towards a dystopian era with many of the most popular young adult novels including deadly games, a post world war and technological advancements. Protagonists of these novels are young characters who are taking control over their destiny and finding their place within their warped societies where the odds are pinned against them. The Hunger Games by Suzanne Collins is a young adult dystopian novel.

==== Romantasy ====
The romantasy genre is a mix between fantasy and romance. A young adult novel that has been written surrounding this genre, Lightlark by Alex Aster, involves world building in a fantasy realm, romance, love triangles, friendship and finding one's self. These are all common tropes among young adult literature that is continuing to create new boundaries of the genre in the world of today.

=== Boundaries between children's, young adult, and adult fiction ===
The boundary between books for children and adult literature is flexible and loosely defined and in particular "the young have always been efficient [plunderers] of stories from all sources, and have carried off such literary booty as pleased them". This boundary has been policed by adults and has "alternated between the rigid and the permeable depending on the political and cultural climate".

At the lower end of the age spectrum, fiction targeted to readers aged 8–12 is referred to as middle grade fiction. Some novels originally marketed to adults are of interest and value to adolescents, and vice versa, as in the case of books such as the Harry Potter series of novels. Some examples of middle grade novels and novel series include the Percy Jackson & the Olympians series by Rick Riordan, The Underland Chronicles by Suzanne Collins, and Diary of a Wimpy Kid by Jeff Kinney.

Examples of young adult novels and novel series include the Harry Potter series by J. K. Rowling, The Hunger Games trilogy by Suzanne Collins, the Alex Rider series by Anthony Horowitz and the Mortal Instruments series by Cassandra Clare.

Middle grade novels are usually shorter, and are significantly less mature and complex in theme and content than YA. YA novels are for ages 12–18, and tackle more mature and adult themes and content than middle grade novels. The latter usually feature protagonists between the ages of 10 and 13, whereas young adult novels usually feature protagonists from 14 to 18.

Adult fiction may explore concepts such as sex, drug use and violence in more graphic ways. In adult romance novels intimate scenes can be graphic in detail. However, in young adult literature intimate scenes may be mentioned but lack excessive detail and events may be said to have happened rather than described. For individual pieces of literary work the line between young adult and adult can become blurry based on a variety of factors, one being the level of graphic detail in the content and the manner in which it is described.

== New adult fiction ==
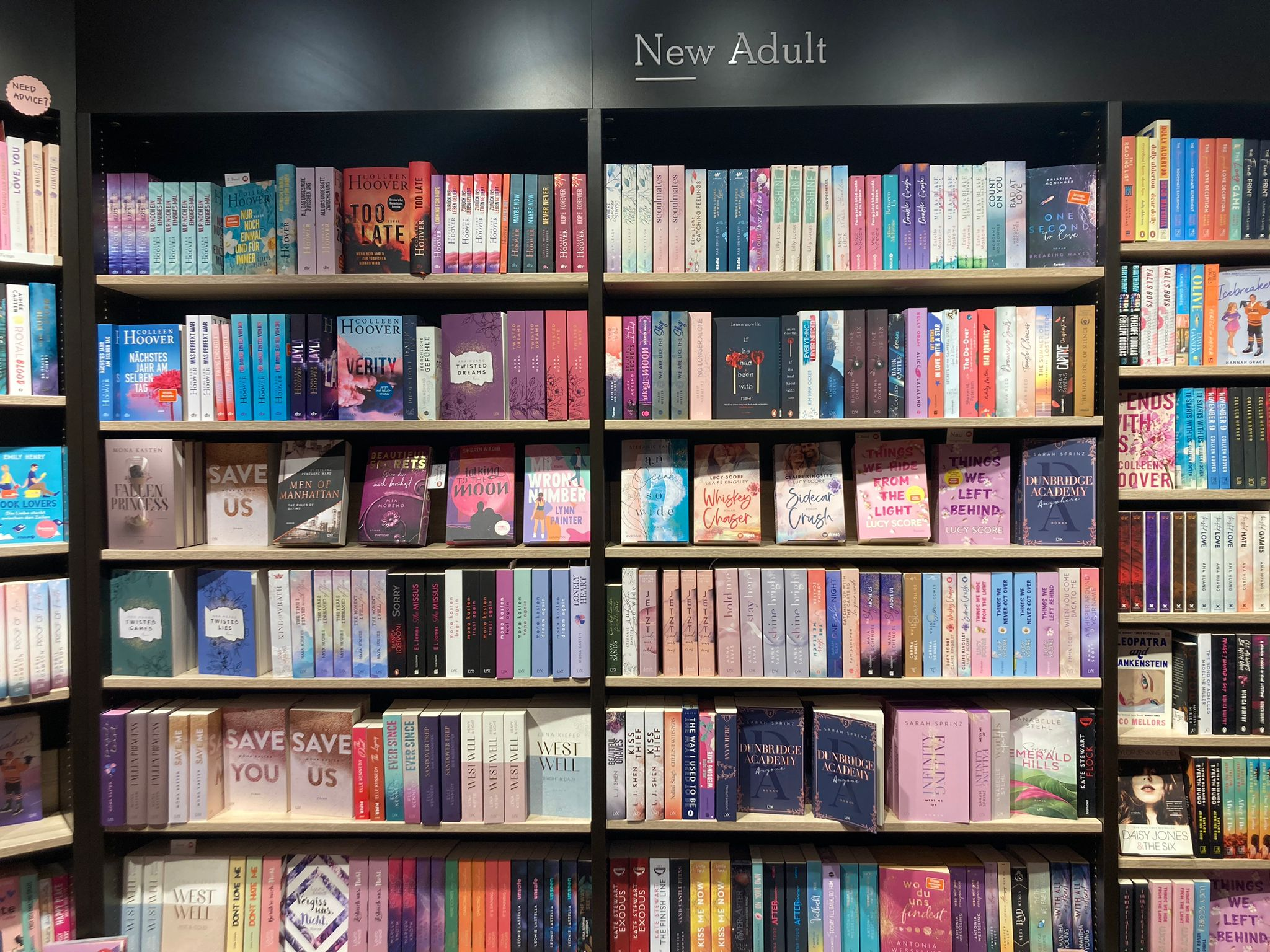
Department with new-adult books in a German bookstore (2023)

New adult (NA) fiction is a developing genre of fiction with protagonists in the 18–29 age bracket. St. Martin's Press coined the term in 2009, when they held a special call for "fiction similar to young adult fiction (YA) that can be published and marketed as adult—a sort of an 'older YA' or 'new adult'". New adult fiction tends to focus on issues such as leaving home, developing sexuality, and negotiating education and career choices. The genre has gained popularity rapidly over the last few years, particularly through books by self-published bestselling authors such as Jennifer L. Armentrout, Cora Carmack, Colleen Hoover, Anna Todd, and Jamie McGuire.

The genre originally faced criticism, as some viewed it as a marketing scheme, while others claimed the readership was not there to publish the material. In contrast, others claimed the term was necessary; a publicist for HarperCollins described it as "a convenient label because it allows parents and bookstores and interested readers to know what is inside".

Examples of books in the new adult genre include Sarah J. Maas's A Court of Thorns and Roses and Throne of Glass, Jennifer L. Armentrout's Wait for You and Blood and Ash series, Jamie McGuire's Beautiful Disaster, Colleen Hoover's Slammed, Cora Carmack's Losing It, Kendall Ryan's The Impact of You and Casey McQuiston's Red, White & Royal Blue.

== Uses in the classroom ==
YA has been integrated into classrooms to increase student interest in reading. Studies have shown that YA can be beneficial in classroom settings. YA fiction is written for adolescents and some believe it to be more relevant to students' social and emotional needs instead of classic literature. Use of YA in classrooms is linked to:

- higher levels of engagement and motivation among students
- increased levels of self-confidence, personal development and self-identification
- increased desire to read similar books

Students who read YA are more likely to appreciate literature and have stronger reading skills than others. YA also allows teachers to talk about "taboo" or difficult topics with their students. For example, a 2014 study shows that using Laurie Halse Anderson's novel Speak aided in discussions on consent and complicity. Those who read about tough situations like date rape are more emotionally prepared to handle the situation if it arises. It is important to use diverse literature in the classroom, especially in discussing taboo topics, to avoid excluding minority students.

Literature written for young adults can also be used as a stepping stone to canonical works that are traditionally read in classrooms, and required by many school curriculums. In Building a Culture of Readers: YA Literature and the Canon by Kara Lycke, Lycke suggests pairing young adult literature and canon works to prepare young adults to understand the classic literature they will encounter. YA can provide familiar and less alienating examples of similar concepts than those in classic literature. Suggested pairings include Rick Riordan's Percy Jackson series with the Iliad or the Odyssey, or Stephenie Meyer's Twilight with Wuthering Heights. When discussing identity, Lycke suggests pairing Hawthorne's The Scarlet Letter with Sherman Alexie's The Absolutely True Diary of a Part-Time Indian. Common required texts in high schools of America include, The Outsiders, Of Mice and Men, and The Crucible.

== Criticism ==
=== Political content ===
Conservative activists and religious groups have criticized young adult fiction for violence, explicit sexual content, obscene language, and suicide. Speculative young adult fiction is sometimes targeted by critics for religious reasons, including religious debates over the Harry Potter series and Philip Pullman's trilogy His Dark Materials. Criticism has also been leveled at young adult fiction authors for alleged insensitivity to marginalized communities or cultural appropriation.

=== Banned books ===
Some Americans have been critical about young adult literature and challenged their children's access to it. The American Library Association conducted a study to determine which books from 2010 to 2019 were most frequently challenged. Titles on this list included The Absolutely True Diary of a Part Time Indian, The Bluest Eye, The Hunger Games, and Of Mice and Men.

=== Lack of diversity ===
English language young adult fiction and children's literature in general have historically shown a lack of books with a main character who is a person of color, LGBT, or disabled. In the UK 90% of the best-selling YA titles from 2006 to 2016 featured white, able-bodied, cisgender, and heterosexual main characters. The numbers of children's book authors have shown a similar lack of diversity. Between 2006 and 2016, eight percent of all young adult authors published in the UK were people of color.

In the mid-2010s, more attention was drawn to diversity from various quarters. In the several years following, diversity numbers seem to have increased: One survey showed that in 2017, 25% of children's books were about minority protagonists, almost a 10% increase from 2016.

=== Literary merit ===
Jack Zipes, a professor of German and literature, has criticized the standardized nature of young adult fiction in Western society. He writes that to become a phenomenon, a work has to "conform to the standards [...] set by the mass media and promoted by the culture industry in general." Zipes complains of similarities between Harry Potter and other well known heroes.

Professor Chris Crowe argues that criticism of young adult fiction arises from the fear that the genre will replace classic works. He also suggests that because there is much poorly written young adult fiction, and the genre's recent development, it has difficulty in establishing its value in relation to the classics of literature.

== See also ==
- Genre fiction
- List of children's classic books
- Children's literature periodicals
- Gay and lesbian teen fiction
- Light novel
- List of young adult authors
- Literary genre
- Shōjo and Shōnen manga
- Verse novel
- Young Adult Library Services Association

== Cited references ==
- Cart, Michael (1996). From Romance to Realism: 50 Years of Growth and Change in Young Adult Literature. New York: HarperCollins
