= Disfluency (2021 film) =

- Theatrical release poster
- Directed by: Anna Baumgarten
- Written by: Anna Baumgarten
- Based on: Disfluency (2018 short film)
- Produced by: Anna Baumgarten; Elaine Hastings Edell; Danny Mooney
- Starring: Libe Barer; Ariela Barer; Chelsea Alden; Dylan Arnold; Travis Tope; Molly Hagan
- Cinematography: Sevag Chahinian; John Fisher
- Edited by: Kevin Birou
- Music by: Nathan Alexander
- Production companies: New Moon Flicks; Vanishing Angle; Chicago Media Angels
- Distributed by: Buffalo 8 Productions; Kanopy
- Release dates: 23 October 2021 (Austin Film Festival); 10 January 2025 (United States); 10 January 2025 (Canada)
- Running time: 95 minutes
- Country: United States
- Language: English

Disfluency is a 2021 American drama film written and directed by Anna Baumgarten, based on her 2018 short film of the same name. The film premiered in competition at the Austin Film Festival, where it won the Grand Jury Prize for Best Narrative Feature. The film subsequently received over two dozen awards and nominations on the festival circuit. The cast includes Libe Barer, Ariela Barer, Chelsea Alden, Dylan Arnold, Travis Tope, and Molly Hagan.

On January 10, 2025, nearly four years after its premiere, Disfluency received a limited theatrical release in the United States and Canada through Buffalo 8 Productions before becoming available to stream via Tubi. The film was met with critical acclaim, and received five nominations from the Indiana Film Journalists Association, including Best Picture, Best Director for Baumgarten, Best Actress for Barer, and Best Supporting Actress for Alden.

== Plot ==
Jane (Libe Barer), a college senior studying speech language pathology fails her final course under unclear circumstances and returns to her family’s lake house in Michigan. Withdrawn and frequently apologetic, she struggles to readjust to life at home with her parents and her sister, Lacey (Ariela Barer), while concealing the cause of her academic collapse. Over the summer, Jane reconnect with childhood friends, including her longtime crush Jordan (Dylan Arnold), but remains emotionally distant as she experiences fragmented memories related to a traumatic incident.

Jane reconnects with Amber (Chelsea Alden), a former childhood friend who has recently become a single mother. Suspecting that Amber’s young son is deaf, Jane begins teaching her American Sign Language. Through this process Jane becomes increasingly aware of her own difficulties in communicating. As the summer progresses, Jane’s anxiety from suppressed memories intensifies, revealing she experienced a sexual assault that led her to withdraw from school. Initially uncertain of how to define or confront the incident, she grapples with feelings of guilt, shame, and a fear of not being believed.

Encouraged by her growing bond with Amber, and with her family’s support, Jane gradually finds the means to articulate her experience. In a pivotal moment, she finally discloses the assault using sign language, marking a breakthrough in her ability to communicate what happened. By summer’s end, Jane beings to reclaim a sense of agency. Though her recovery remains ongoing, she resolves to move forward—returning to college and confronting her trauma with greater clarity and confidence.

== Cast ==
- Libe Barer as Jane
- Ariela Barer as Lacey
- Chelsea Alden as Amber
- Dylan Arnold as Jordan
- Travis Tope as Dylan
- Molly Hagan as Professor Parker
- Kimiko Singer as Kennedy
- Ricky Wayne as Louis
- Diana DeLaCruz as Dorothy
- Wayne David Parker as Officer Fitzpatrick
- Garrett Edell as Brendon
- Michael Alan Herman as Theo

== Production ==
=== Development ===
Disfluency was initially made as a 2018 short film, written by Baumgarten and directed by Laura Holliday. The short film premiered at the National Film Festival for Talented Youth. Disfluency was subsequently selected for Jim Cummings' Short to Feature Lab, where Baumgarten developed a feature-length script. The story picks up after the events of the short, as Jane spends the summer at her family's lake house, trying to find a new way to live with her trauma, a process aided by learning American Sign Language. Both Barer and Arnold, who were featured in the original short film, returend for the feature-length project.

=== Filming ===
Disfluency was primarily filmed on location in the Metro Detroit area of Michigan in the summer of 2019, specifically in Commerce Township, Livonia, Royal Oak, and Walled Lake, utilizing local spots like the Creamy Freeze and Penny Lane Market, with the director wanting to capture the feeling of her own Michigan roots. The film's production crew was composed primarily of University of Michigan alumni.

== Release ==
Disfluency premiered in competition at the Austin Film Festival on October 23, 2021, where it won the Grand Jury Prize for Best Narrative Feature. The film continued to play the festival circuit for the next year, but failed to find distribution. Nearly four years later, the film's distribution rights were acquired by Buffalo 8 Productions for a limited theatrical release in the United States and Canada beginning January 10, 2025, before becoming available to stream January 24, 2025.

== Reception ==
=== Critical response ===
Disfluency received mostly positive reviews, with many critics lauding Barer's performance as well as Baumgarten's potential as a filmmaker. The film currently holds a score of 86% "Fresh" on the review aggregator website Rotten Tomatoes.

Clint Worthington of RogerEbert.com awarded the film 2.5/4 stars, noting

An unabashed treatise on the way trauma interrupts our lives, short-circuits our esteem, and forces us to take a breath and start over. Oftentimes, that didacticism gets in the way of the picture’s aims, with clunky metaphors and treacly microbudget indie quirks. But a couple of scenes, and some strong performances, make it ultimately worth the sit… It’s full of disfluency, whether we need a novel new term for it or not. When Baumgarten and her game cast remember that, “Disfluency” hums with surprising resonance.

Adrienne Hunter in a review for The Austin Chronicle observed

While there are moments of dialogue and character interaction where the film’s message is very explicit, even heavy-handed, they are more than made up for by the genuineness exuding from the film. Through attention to detail, dynamic character relationships, and strong performances, Disfluency proves to clearly communicate a meaningful and insightful story that will surely leave a strong impression.

In a similar vein, Manuel Betancourt in a review for Variety noted

"Scenes when Baumgarten has Jane tackle her trauma head-on — when she shows us the messy ways she first dealt with it and the imperfect ways she’s dealing with it now — are its most effective and affecting. Treating Jane’s experience with care, she refuses to make her story — as a victim, as a survivor, as both or neither — into a neat tale… If its ambitions never quite meet its execution, “Disfluency” is (clunky title aside) an amiable watch with its heart (and head) in the right place that still manages to charm, perhaps because it so exalts the very concept of imperfection."

=== Accolades ===
Year	Association	Category	Nominee	Result	Ref.
2021	Austin Film Festival	Best Narrative Feature	Anna Baumgarten	Won	
2021	Heartland International Film Festival	Best Narrative Feature	Anna Baumgarten	Nominated	
2021	Calgary International Film Festival	Best Narrative Feature	Anna Baumgarten	Nominated	
2021	Indiana Film Journalists Association	Best Picture	Anna Baumgarten	Nominated	
2021	Indiana Film Journalists Association	Breakthrough of the Year	Anna Baumgarten	Nominated	
2021	Indiana Film Journalists Association	Best Director	Anna Baumgarten	Nominated	
2021	Indiana Film Journalists Association	Best Actress	Libe Barer	Nominated	
2021	Indiana Film Journalists Association	Best Supporting Actress	Chelsea Alden	Nominated	
2022	Portland Film Festival	Best Narrative Feature	Anna Baumgarten	Won	
2022	Oxford Film Festival	Best Narrative Feature	Anna Baumgarten	Won	
2022	Cleveland International Film Festival	American Independents Competition	Anna Baumgarten	Nominated	
2022	Florida Film Festival	Best Narrative Feature	Anna Baumgarten	Nominated	
2022	Capital City Film Festival	Best Narrative Feature	Anna Baumgarten	Won	
2022	Newport Beach Film Festival	Best Screenplay	Anna Baumgarten	Won	
2022	Newport Beach Film Festival	Best Actress	Libe Barer	Won	
2022	Lake County Film Festival	Best Narrative Feature	Anna Baumgarten	Won	
2022	Eastern Oregon Film Festival	Best Narrative Feature	Anna Baumgarten	Won	
2022	DeadCENTER Film Festival	Best Narrative Feature	Anna Baumgarten	Won	
2022	Naples International Film Festival	Programmers Choice Award	Anna Baumgarten	Won	
2022	New Hampshire Film Festival	Best Narrative Feature	Anna Baumgarten	Nominated	
2022	Ouray International Film Festival	Best Feature	Anna Baumgarten	Won	
2022	Ouray International Film Festival	Audience Choice Award	Anna Baumgarten	Won	
2023	Film Club's The Lost Weekend	Best Film	Anna Baumgarten	Won	
2023	Film Club's The Lost Weekend	Best Actress	Libe Barer	Won	
2023	Film Club's The Lost Weekend	Best Director	Anna Baumgarten	Won	
