= Abbi Glines =

American novelist

- Born: Lora Abigail Potts; Birmingham, Alabama, U.S.
- Spouses: Keith Austin Glines (1997-2018); Britt Sullivan (2020-Present)
- Children: Keith Austin Glines Jr; Rebecca Annabelle Glines; Ava Sophia Glines; Emerson Pearce Sullivan
- Writing career
- Genre: new-adult fiction
- Website: abbiglinesbooks.com

Abbi Glines (Abigail Glines) is an American New York Times, USA Today, and Wall Street Journal bestselling novelist. Her new-adult fiction titled Fallen Too Far was self-published on eBook and paperback in 2012.

The remaining of the Too Far series, Never Too Far and Forever Too Far had a lot of success with younger audiences. The content of the books is rated 16+ because of its explicit content. Glines is also the author of the initially self-published young adult bestselling series The Vincent Boys.

Glines recently released the last of the Too Far series in the male lead's point of view. The ninth book in the Rosemary Beach series, titled You Were Mine, was released 2014.

== Bibliography ==
=== The Field Party ===
1. Until Friday Night (2015)
2. Under the Lights (2016)
3. After the Game (2017)
4. Losing the Field (2018)
5. Making a Play (2019)
6. Game Changer (2022)
7. The Last Field Party(2022)

=== Rosemary Beach ===
1. Fallen Too Far (2012)
2. Never Too Far (2013)
3. Forever Too Far (2013)
4. Rush Too Far (2014)
5. Twisted Perfection (2013)
6. Simple Perfection (2013)
7. Take a Chance (2014)
8. One More Chance (2014)
9. You Were Mine (2014)
10. Kiro's Emily (2014)
11. When I'm Gone (2015)
12. When You're Back (2015)
13. The Best Goodbye (2015)
14. Up In Flames (2016)
15. Going Too Far (2022)

=== Sea Breeze ===
1. Breathe (2011)
2. Because of Low (2012)
3. While it Lasts (2012)
4. Just For Now (2012)
5. Sometimes It Lasts (2013)
6. Misbehaving (2013)
7. Bad for You (2015)
8. Hold on Tight (2015)
9. Until the End (2016)

=== Existence Trilogy ===
1. Existence (2011)
2. Predestined (2012)
3. Leif (2012)
4. Ceaseless (2012)

=== The Vincent Boys ===
1. The Vincent Boys (2011)
2. The Vincent Brothers (2012)

=== Once She Dreamed ===
1. Once She Dreamed: Part 1 (2016)
2. Once She Dreamed: Part 2 (2016)

=== Sea Breeze Meets Rosemary Beach ===
1. Like a Memory (2017)
2. Because Of Lila (2017)
3. Best I’ve Ever Had (2019)

=== South of the Mason Dixon ===
1. Boys South of the Mason Dixon (2017)
2. Brothers South of Mason Dixon (2018)
3. Broken South of Mason Dixon (2019)

=== Black Souls series ===
- Charmed Souls (2020)

=== Smoke series ===
1. smokeshow (2023)

=== Standalone Novels ===
- As She Fades (2018)
- About Tomorrow... (2020)
