= Kendall Ryan =

Kendall Ryan may refer to:

- Kendall Ryan (cyclist) (born 1992), American racing cyclist
- Kendall Ryan (novelist) (born 1981), American novelist
