= Beautiful Wedding =

2024 film by Roger Kumble

- Theatrical release poster
- Directed by: Roger Kumble
- Screenplay by: Roger Kumble
- Based on: A Beautiful Wedding by Jamie McGuire
- Produced by: Brian Pitt; David Shojai; Roger Kumble; Nicolas Chartier; Jonathan Deckter
- Starring: Dylan Sprouse; Virginia Gardner; Austin North; Libe Barer; Steven Bauer; Alex Aiono; Rob Estes; Kyle Richards
- Cinematography: Theo van de Sande
- Edited by: Justin Reeder
- Music by: Sam Ewing
- Production company: Voltage Pictures
- Distributed by: Vertical Entertainment
- Release date: January 24, 2024
- Running time: 94 minutes
- Country: United States
- Language: English
- Box office: $1,760,838 (international only)

Beautiful Wedding is a 2024 American romantic comedy film written and directed by Roger Kumble. It is based on Jamie McGuire's 2013 novel A Beautiful Wedding, and serves as the sequel to Beautiful Disaster (2023).

After a crazy night in Las Vegas, Abby and Travis are shocked to find that they are married, so they head to Mexico for a honeymoon with friends and family, during which time they grapple with the possibility of getting an annulment.

The film was released in theaters for by Fathom Events for two nights starting on January 24, 2024. It was released on digital platforms by Vertical Entertainment on February 13, 2024.

== Plot ==
After a crazy night in Vegas, Abby and Travis wake up as accidental newlyweds. Travis receives a call from Benny, who previously tried to con Abby into settling her father's debts to him by playing poker. He warns them not to leave town to avoid settling their debt to him.

Abby and Travis, along with their friends Shepley and America, take a helicopter to a resort in Gatito, Mexico for their honeymoon. They are greeted by their host, Sancho and a mariachi band.

At dinner, Abby presents Travis with a point-based pros and cons list for getting their marriage annulled. During this dinner he pretends to be sick to watch the NBA finals with Shepley until she catches them.

When the power at the resort goes out, Abby reveals that she has always wanted to live in Paris, upsetting Travis. They reconcile via pool sex. The next day, Travis finds Abby juggling with a shirtless Manuel, the local priest in training.

Travis is enraged and they fight until they reach the beach. There, he is hit on by topless women, prompting Abby to remove her bikini top which provokes him into get into fighting with multiple other beach goers. The couple ends up in Mexican jail, where they are bailed out by Sancho.

Benny is notified that Abby and Travis are in Mexico and suggests to his boyfriend Darius that they go down there to settle the debt. However, Darius leaves Benny.

Travis confesses always wanting a bachelor party, so his brothers fly down to Mexico to join the group. During the party, the same two women who had flirted with Travis topless, answer Abby's FaceTime call to his phone again topless. Abby feels prompted to seek revenge.

Abby and America are spending the night at the house of a woman they met that day at the spa, who also turns out to be the mother of Parker Hayes, who she had dated briefly in college. Abby crawls into Parker's bed in an attempt to take a selfie with him while he is asleep. In the morning, Travis finds her in bed with Parker and a fight ensues. This leads the couple to counseling with Manuel where Travis walks out.

On her way to speak with Travis, Abby runs into Benny and they engage in a physical fight. He explains he is in Mexico to try and reconcile with Darius, not to threaten Travis and Abby. They return to the resort and make peace. Travis and Abby then hold a wedding reception at the resort and agree to no longer keep track of points in their marriage.

== Cast ==
- Dylan Sprouse as Travis Maddox
- Virginia Gardner as Abby Abernathy Maddox
- Austin North as Shepley Maddox
- Libe Barer as America
- Rob Estes as Benny
- Steven Bauer as Sancho
- Kyle Richards as Vivian Hayes
- Alex Aiono as Miguel
- Emmanuel Kabongo as Buzz
- Declan Laird as Taylor Maddox
- Trevor Van Uden as Thomas Maddox
- Jack Hesketh as Trenton Maddox
- Micky Dartford as Tyler Maddox
- Neil Bishop as Parker Hayes

== Production ==
In September 2023, it was announced that the sequel to 2023's Beautiful Disaster titled Beautiful Wedding was set to be released. Roger Kumble returned to direct along with the main cast also returning. Principal photography took place at the end of 2022 in the Dominican Republic.

== Release ==
Like with the first film, Beautiful Wedding was released in the United States in limited theaters by Fathom Events for two nights starting January 24, 2024. The film was released on digital platforms by Vertical Entertainment on February 13, 2024.
