= Libe Barer =

American actress

- Born: Libe Alexandra Barer; December 19, 1991 (age 34); Los Angeles, California, U.S.
- Education: Los Angeles County High School for the Arts; University of California, Los Angeles (B.A.)
- Occupation: Actress
- Years active: 2007–present
- Relatives: Ariela Barer (sister)

Libe Alexandra Barer (born December 19, 1991) is an American actress. She is best known for playing Carly Bowman in the Amazon Prime Video original series Sneaky Pete (2015-2019). She has also had recurring roles in the NBC drama series Parenthood (2014-2015), the USA science fiction series Colony (2016), and the truTV sitcom Those Who Can't (2016-2019). Her film work includes roles in the horror films I See You (2019) and Slapface (2021), the indie drama Disfluency (2021), the romantic comedy Beautiful Disaster (2023), and its sequel Beautiful Wedding (2024).

In animation, Barer has voiced numerous characters including Sage in Disney's Star Darlings (2015–2016), Violet Sabrewing in DuckTales (2019–2021), Jen in Rugrats (2021–2023), and Casey Calderón in Marvel's Moon Girl and Devil Dinosaur (2023–2025). For her performance in the latter, Barer was nominated for the Imagen Award for Best Voice-Over Actor. Her younger sister is actress Ariela Barer.

== Early life and education ==
Barer was born on December 19, 1991, in Los Angeles, California to Mexican-born Jewish parents. Her father is a pianist and classical composer, while her mother is a visual artist and writer who previously worked for a comedy radio program in Mexico. Her younger sister is actress and filmmaker Ariela Barer.

Barer attended the Los Angeles County High School for the Arts, where she received a Moondance Film Festival Award for her student screenplay On Top of the World. She later matriculated to the University of California, Los Angeles, earning a B.A. from the UCLA School of Theater, Film and Television.

== Career ==
=== 2007-2014: Child acting ===
Barer began her career as a child actor in 2007, appearing as a guest star on the Nickelodeon sitcom Unfabulous. Later that year, she played the recurring role of Tareen on season one of iCarly, also on Nickelodeon. In 2010, she appeared as Fatima Vences in the pilot episode of the ABC legal drama The Whole Truth. In 2014, she had guest role as teen patient Monica McKeever on season 11 of the ABC medical drama Grey's Anatomy. She later appeared in a recurring role on seasons 5 and 6 of the NBC family drama series Parenthood as the teenage daughter of Tina Holmes character.

=== 2015-present: Sneaky Pete and feature film roles ===
In 2015, Barer was cast as a series regular on the Amazon Prime Video original series Sneaky Pete. The series received critical acclaim and ran for three seasons, concluding its run in 2019. In 2016, Barer had a recurring arc as high school student Pia on season one of the USA science fiction series Colony. That same year, she began portraying teacher Beth on the truTV sitcom Those Who Can't, which ran for three seasons until 2019. Later that year, Barer made her feature film debut opposite Helen Hunt and Jon Tenney in the horror film I See You. The film premiered at the SXSW Film Festival to generally positive reviews from critics.

In 2021, Barer starred in the independent feature film Disfluency, a coming-of-age drama about sexual assault. The film was well received on the festival circuit with Barer winning Best Actress prizes at the Newport Beach Film Festival and Film Club's The Lost Weekend. Additionally, she was nominated in the Best Actress category by the Indiana Film Journalists Association. Clint Worthington, in a review for RogerEbert.com noted "Barer's a beautifully brittle nerve effortlessly captures the anxiety that comes from not just facing the trauma of what's happened to you, but questioning whether it even happened the way you remember." Later that same year, Barer starred in the horror film Slapface. The film premiered at the Cinequest Film Festival where it won the Audience Award and received distribution through Shudder. Slapface received critical praise and holds a score of 91% "Fresh" on the review aggregator Rotten Tomatoes. In 2022, Barer was a featured vocalist in Baz Luhrmann's music biopic Elvis. The following year she co-starred as America Mason in Roger Kumble's romantic comedy Beautiful Disaster, based on the Jamie McGuire novel of the same name. She reprised her role in the 2024 sequel Beautiful Wedding.

=== Voice acting ===
In addition to her work on screen, Barer is also a voice actress. From 2015 to 2016, she voiced Sage in the Disney animated series Star Darlings. From 2019 to 2021, she voiced the recurring character Violet Sabrewing in the reboot of the Disney animated series Ducktales. From 2021 to 2023, she voiced the recurring character of Jen Z in the reboot of the Nickelodeon animated series Rugrats. From 2023 to 2025, Barer voiced the character Casey Calderón in the Marvel animated series Moon Girl and Devil Dinosaur, which aired on Disney+. For her work on the series, Barer was nominated for the Imagen Award for Best Voice-Over Actor. Since 2024, Barer has voiced the character Seven in the English dub of the anime series Beastars on Netflix.

== Personal life ==
Barer lives in New York City. She identifies as Latina and Jewish.

== Filmography ==
=== Film ===
Year	Title	Role	Notes	Ref.
2019	I See You	Mindy		
2019	The Lost Weekend	Penelope	Short film	
2021	Disfluency	Jane		
2021	Slapface	Anna		
2022	Elvis	Singer		
2023	Among the Beasts	Lola		
2023	Beautiful Disaster	America Mason		
2024	Beautiful Wedding	America Mason		

=== Television ===
Year	Title	Role	Notes	Ref.
2007	Unfabulous	Marie	Episode: "The New Best Friend"	
2007–2008	iCarly	Tareen	2 episodes	
2010	The Whole Truth	Fatima Vences	Episode: "Pilot"	
2014	Grey's Anatomy	Monica McKeever	Episode: "I Must Have Lost It On My Wind"	
2014–2015	Parenthood	Kiara	5 episodes	
2015–2019	Sneaky Pete	Carly Bowman	Main role, 30 episodes	
2015–2016	Star Darlings	Sage (voice)	Main role, 13 episodes	
2016	Colony	Pia	3 episodes	
2016–2019	Those Who Can't	Beth	6 episodes	
2019–2021	DuckTales	Violet Sabrewing (voice)	8 episodes	
2021–2023	Rugrats	Jen (voice)	2 episodes	
2023–2025	Moon Girl and Devil Dinosaur	Casey Calderón (voice)	Main role, 40 episodes	
2024–present	Beastars	Seven (voice)	2 episodes	
2025	Wildemount Wildlings	Jessep Nimblethorp	3 episodes	

=== Theatre ===
Year	Title	Role	Playwright	Venue	Ref.
2019	Here I Lie	Maris	Courtney Baron	59E59 Theaters, Off-Broadway	
2025	The American Dream	Corina	Juan Ramirez Jr.	Urban Stages, Off-Broadway	

== Awards and nominations ==
Year	Award	Category	Work	Result	Ref.
2019	Northeast Film Festival	Best Supporting Actress	The Lost Weekend	Won	
2021	Indiana Film Journalists Association	Best Actress	Disfluency	Nominated	
2021	Newport Beach Film Festival	Best Actress	Disfluency	Won	
2021	Film Club's The Lost Weekend	Best Actress	Disfluency	Won	
2024	Imagen Awards	Best Voice-Over Actor	Moon Girl and Devil Dinosaur	Nominated	
