= Beautiful Disaster (film) =

2023 film by Roger Kumble

- Theatrical release poster
- Directed by: Roger Kumble
- Screenplay by: Roger Kumble
- Based on: Beautiful Disaster by Jamie McGuire
- Produced by: Brian Pitt; Nicolas Chartier; Jonathan Deckter; Roger Kumble; Mark Clayman
- Starring: Dylan Sprouse; Virginia Gardner; Austin North; Libe Barer; Rob Estes; Brian Austin Green; Michael Cudlitz; Neil Bishop
- Cinematography: Joshua Reis
- Edited by: Matthew Rundell
- Music by: Sam Ewing
- Production company: Voltage Pictures
- Distributed by: Vertical Entertainment
- Release date: April 12, 2023
- Running time: 95 minutes
- Country: United States
- Language: English
- Box office: $6.9 million (international only)

Beautiful Disaster is a 2023 American romantic comedy drama film directed and written by Roger Kumble and starring Dylan Sprouse and Virginia Gardner. The film is based on Jamie McGuire's 2011 novel.

The film follows Abby, a card playing prodigy turned college freshman, in hopes to reinvent herself while trying to resist her attraction to bad boy, Travis.

The film was released in theaters on April 12, 2023, and was released digitally on May 2, 2023. A sequel, Beautiful Wedding was released in theaters on January 24, 2024.

== Plot ==
Abby Abernathy, groomed from a young age by her father to excel at cards, leaves her home in Las Vegas in hopes of reinventing herself in college. She is roommates with her old friend Mer, who on her first night takes her to a secret fight club. There, Abby and the star fighter Travis have instant chemistry.

The next day, Abby pays for her first semester to the bursar in cash but is warned that future payments must be done through the bank. Talking about it with Mer, Travis pops by and throws her off guard, then disappears.

Travis reappears in Abby's class, catching her spying on him on Instagram. He insists on picking her up later for a dinner date. Although Abby does meet with him at the designated time, she dresses in a decidedly non-sexy way, will not allow him to pay and clearly establishes they are only platonic friends. Travis tells her about his family, but she divulges nothing about herself before calling it a night.

When Abby's dorm has a water issue, Travis's cousin and Mer's boyfriend Shepley let Abby stay in their apartment. Sharing with Travis, he offers Abby a spot on his massive bed, but in the morning, she accidentally stimulates him.

After Abby has a dinner date with fellow student Parker, he takes them to watch a fight. Turning out to be another Travis fight, Travis begins to show his jealously you of Abby being with another guy. In the heat of an argument, a bet was struck. Travis wagers if he can go the whole fight and win, without the other fighter touching him, Abby must stay at his apartment with him for a month. If he loses, he agrees to having no sex for a month. After an intense fight, Travis wins.

A few weeks in, Travis takes Abby home to meet his dad and four brothers. Soon, they break out cards and chips for poker. Initially opting out, eventually they deal her in. When she cleans house, her Vegas background is revealed, that she is an infamous player nicknamed Lucky 13. Her celebrity status make her an instant family member with the brothers.

The following days they get closer and closer, culminating in Travis and Abby starting to have sex. Panicking, she throws him to the floor and seeks Mer. Abby believes she is in love with him, but before she can return, Travis bolts. Having seen a loving message from Mick on her computer, he gets jealous.

Travis has no idea Mick is Abby's father, whom she had avoided engaging with since she left Vegas. Abby leaves, furious, and is later found asleep in the library by Parker. After Shepley sends out an APB for her, he takes her to her surprise birthday party, thrown by Travis as a way to apologize.

Drinking and dancing all night, Travis finds Abby, stops her drinking and nurses her. Thanks to him, by 1 p.m. the next day she wakes, hangover free. After Travis gives her a full body massage, they finally make love. In the morning, back at her dorm, a car is waiting for her. A man tells her she needs to go back to Vegas. When Abby refuses, he tells her it’s about her father.

Arriving to Vegas, Abby meets with her father and loan shark Benny. With Mick’s poker luck dwindling over the years, Benny is now charging Abby to pay off her father’s $100,000 debt. Meanwhile, Travis finds out from Mer about Abby’s troubles and races to Vegas to help her. After hours of poker playing, she is successful and about to leave when a security guard she grew up with stops her. He confiscates the money as she is under 21. Told she still owes the money, Travis offers to participate in a prize fight to win it back.

Meanwhile, Abby discovers it was a ruse, Mick does not owe anyone anything and wanted Abby to win money for him to skip town. She gets the money back with a taser, then heads to stop the fight. Starting a fire as a distraction, she and recently arrived Shepley rescue Travis. After discovering the money Abby stole back, Travis and Abby celebrate their relationship and freedom with one more night in Vegas.

== Cast ==
- Dylan Sprouse as Travis Maddox
- Virginia Gardner as Abby Abernathy
- Libe Barer as America
- Austin North as Shepley
- Neil Bishop as Parker Hayes
- Brian Austin Green as Mick Abernathy
- Rob Estes as Benny
- Samuel Larsen as Jesse
- Michael Cudlitz as Jim Maddox
- Declan Michael Laird as Taylor Maddox
- Micky Dartford as Tyler Maddox
- Jack Hesketh as Trenton Maddox
- Trevor Van Uden as Thomas Maddox
- Akshay Kumar as Adam
- Autumn Reeser as Professor Felder

== Production ==
In 2012, Warner Bros. Entertainment optioned the film rights for Beautiful Disaster, but the project never went into development and the Warner Bros. option ended May 13, 2014. In 2020, it was optioned by Voltage Pictures, production began in 2021 with Roger Kumble directing, and Dylan Sprouse, Rob Estes and Virginia Gardner in the cast.

The project received public criticism due to McGuire's controversial far-right political statements.

== Release ==
Beautiful Disaster was released in the United States for two nights only, April 12–13, as part of Fathom Events. It was released on digital platforms by Vertical Entertainment on May 3, 2023. The film began streaming on Hulu August 11, 2023.

=== Reception ===
On the review aggregator website Rotten Tomatoes, 29% of 7 critics' reviews are positive, with an average rating of 4.5/10.

== Sequel ==
A sequel was released in theaters on January 24, 2024.
