= Disfluency (2018 film) =

- Directed by: Laura Holliday
- Story by: Anna Baumgarten
- Produced by: Anna Baumgarten
- Starring: Libe Barer
- Production company: Vanishing Angle
- Release date: October 27, 2018 (NFFTY)
- Country: United States
- Language: English

Disfluency is a 2018 American short film directed by Laura Holliday and starring Libe Barer. The film follows a young woman through her daily life, from her passive usage of the phrase "I'm sorry," to her being raped and the emotional aftermath.

== Cast ==
- Libe Barer as Jane
- Dylan Arnold as Mark
- Julia Barrett-Mitchell as Kelsey
- Yoshi Sudarso as Sean
- Jon Berry as Professor
- Kelly L. George as Nurse
- Garrett Louis as Brendon
- Ella Shockey as Doe.
