= Sneaky Pete =

American crime drama television series (2015–2019)

- Genre: Dark comedy; Comedy drama; Crime drama
- Created by: David Shore; Bryan Cranston
- Starring: Giovanni Ribisi; Marin Ireland; Shane McRae; Libe Barer; Michael Drayer; Peter Gerety; Margo Martindale; Jane Adams; Efrat Dor
- Opening theme: "Harder Out Here" by The Bright Light Social Hour
- Composers: Nathan Barr; Stephen Lukach
- Country of origin: United States
- Original language: English
- No. of seasons: 3
- No. of episodes: 30

Production
- Executive producers: Graham Yost; Michael Dinner; Fred Golan; Bryan Cranston; Seth Gordon; James Degus; David Shore (Pilot); Erin Gunn (Pilot)
- Producers: Sal Calleros; Ingrid Escajeda; Margo Myers Massey; Mary Rohlich (Pilot)
- Cinematography: Rene Ohashi; David Hennings (Pilot); Frankie DeMarco, ASC (Season 2)
- Camera setup: Single-camera
- Running time: 41–59 minutes
- Production companies: Shore Z Productions; Nemo Films; Moonshot Entertainment; Exhibit A Sony Pictures Television; Amazon Studios

Original release
- Network: Amazon Prime Video
- Release: August 7, 2015 – May 10, 2019

Sneaky Pete is an American comedy crime drama television series created by David Shore and Bryan Cranston. The series follows Marius Josipović (Giovanni Ribisi), a released convict who adopts the identity of his cellmate, Pete Murphy, to avoid his past life. The series also stars Marin Ireland, Shane McRae, Libe Barer, Michael Drayer, Peter Gerety and Margo Martindale.

The pilot episode premiered on August 7, 2015, and was followed by a full series order that September. Shore left the project in early 2016 and was replaced by Graham Yost, who served as executive producer and showrunner for the remaining nine episodes. The first season premiered in its entirety on January 13, 2017, exclusively on Amazon Prime Video. On January 19, 2017, Amazon announced that Sneaky Pete had been renewed for a second season, which was released on March 9, 2018. On July 28, 2018, Amazon announced that the series had been renewed for a third season, which was released on May 10, 2019. On June 4, 2019, Amazon cancelled the series after three seasons.

== Premise ==
Sneaky Pete follows Marius, a con man who gets out of prison only to find himself hunted by the vicious gangster he once robbed. With nowhere else to turn, Marius takes cover from his past by assuming the identity of his cellmate, Pete, and then "reunites" with Pete's estranged family, who have no reason to suspect he is not their long-lost loved one.

== Cast and characters ==
=== Main ===
- Giovanni Ribisi as Marius Josipović / Pete Murphy
- Marin Ireland as Julia Bowman
- Shane McRae as Taylor Bowman
- Libe Barer as Carly Bowman
- Michael Drayer as Eddie Josipović (season 1)
- Peter Gerety as Otto Bernhardt
- Margo Martindale as Audrey Bernhardt
- Jane Adams as Maggie Murphy (season 2, guest season 3)

=== Recurring ===
- Ethan Embry as the real Pete Murphy
- Bryan Cranston as Vince Lonigan (season 1)
- Victor Williams as Richard (season 1)
- Karolina Wydra as Karolina (season 1)
- Jacob Pitts as Lance Lord
- Michael O'Keefe as Detective Winslow (season 1)
- Virginia Kull as Katie Boyd (season 1, guest season 2)
- Alison Wright as Marjorie
- Mike Houston as Dennis
- Tobias Segal as Sean
- Brad William Henke as Brendon Boyd (season 1)
- Jeté Laurence as Ellen
- Justine Cotsonas as Shannon
- Kevin Chapman as Bo Lockley
- Jay O. Sanders as Sam
- Chaske Spencer as Chayton Dockery
- René Ifrah as Wali
- Jasmine Carmichael as Gina (seasons 1–2)
- Pej Vahdat as Raj Kumar Mukherjee (season 1)
- Max Darwin as Tate
- Jeffrey De Serrano as Ayawamat
- Malcolm-Jamal Warner as James Bagwell
- C. S. Lee as Joseph Lee (seasons 1–2)
- Ben Vereen as Leon Porter (seasons 1–2)
- Domenick Lombardozzi as Abraham Persikof (season 1)
- Debra Monk as Connie Persikof (season 1)
- Joseph Lyle Taylor as Frank (seasons 1–2)
- Michael DeMello as Mikey (season 1)
- Desmond Harrington as Joe (seasons 1–2)
- David Kallaway as Bako (season 2)
- Jesse Lenat as AJ
- Michael Oberholtzer as Colin (season 2)
- Jennifer Ferrin as Joyce Roby (season 2)
- Miriam Morales as Teacher (season 2)
- John Ales as Luka Delchev (season 2)
- Sara Tomko as Suzanne (season 2)
- Chris Ashworth as Miro (season 2)
- Justine Lupe as Hannah (season 2)
- Efrat Dor as Lizzie DeLaurentis (season 3)
- Jeff Ross as D.C. Doug Decker (season 3)
- Leonardo Nam as Alexandre Park-Sun (season 3)
- Ricky Jay as T. H. Vignetti (season 3). This was Jay's last performance before his death in 2018.
- Darren Pettie as Chuck Johnson (season 3)
- Stephanie Faracy as Dotti (season 3)
- Charlayne Woodard as Hickey (season 3)
- Amy Landecker as Lorraine Sheffield (season 3)
- M. Emmet Walsh as Tex Hopkins (season 3)
- Patrick J. Adams as Stefan Kilbane (season 3)

=== Guest ===
- Rory Culkin as Gavin
- Wayne Duvall as Charles McGregor
- Steve Wiebe as Stephen Davidson

== Episodes ==
=== Series overview ===
Season	Episodes		Originally released
1	10	1	August 7, 2015
1	10	9	January 13, 2017
2	10		March 9, 2018
3	10		May 10, 2019

=== Season 1 (2015–17) ===
No. overall	No. in season	Title	Directed by	Written by	Original release date
1	1	"Pilot"	Seth Gordon	Story by : David Shore & Bryan Cranston; Teleplay by : David Shore	August 7, 2015
On the run from vicious gangster Vince Lonigan (Bryan Cranston), con man Marius Josipovic (Giovanni Ribisi) takes cover from his past by assuming the identity of his prison cellmate, Pete (Ethan Embry), who has talked so much about his family that Marius thinks he knows enough about them to pull it off. He meets and moves in with Pete's estranged family, who believe him to be Pete.
2	2	"Safe"	Michael Dinner	Graham Yost	January 13, 2017
As their bail bonds business continues to not do so well, tensions rise between Pete's grandparents, Otto (Peter Gerety) and Audrey (Margo Martindale). Marius proposes a risky play to help "cousin" Julia (Marin Ireland) manage a dangerous client, but when they encounter problems, the "cousins" must rely on Audrey's expertise. While evading a mysterious pursuer, Marius visits former partners Katie (Virginia Kull) and Karolina (Karolina Wydra) in NYC and remembers how three years ago, he made a powerful enemy in Vince by trying to work an unsuccessful "con" on him.
3	3	"Mr. Success"	Michael Pressman	Fred Golan	January 13, 2017
Marius' parole officer (Malcolm-Jamal Warner) insists that he come into the city for a mandatory appointment. To get there on time, Marius must fend off Pete's curious cousins, including an increasingly suspicious Audrey. Meanwhile, Marius' brother Eddie (Michael Drayer) is still held captive by Vince. Winslow (Michael O'Keefe), an NYPD detective on Vince's payroll, hunts for Marius, and Katie helps Marius cover his tracks.
4	4	"The Fury"	Craig Zisk	Benjamin Cavell	January 13, 2017
Lured by the promise of a big payday in the bail bonds office safe, Marius tries to work the angles with Pete's family. However, he finds it more difficult than expected to manipulate Taylor (Shane McRae), who harbors both a hair-trigger temper and a dangerous secret of his own: he is sleeping with the wife of a high school enemy who owns a competing bail bonds business. Back in the city, Vince struggles with a difficult client at the poker table and takes his frustrations out on his crew.
5	5	"Sam"	Sarah Pia Anderson	Graham Yost	January 13, 2017
Audrey and Otto argue over Audrey's unilateral decisions, the fallout from which may cost them their business. In the process of helping Otto investigate one of his suspicions, Marius makes a major discovery about Audrey's finances. Meanwhile, Carly (Libe Barer) quizzes Marius/Pete about his past, while Julia rekindles her relationship with ex-husband Lance (Jacob Pitts).
6	6	"Coyote Is Always Hungry"	Adam Arkin	Jennifer Kennedy	January 13, 2017
When the Dockery case gets favorably resolved in court, Bernhardt Bail Bonds struggles to recover the money they put up as collateral, as they need to return it to Dockery (Chaske Spencer). Fearing major problems if they can't come up with the money, Otto visits old friends on the local Indian reservation, and Marius recruits younger talent to help. An outside source leads Carly to unearth a major secret about Marius/Pete, and Julia must decide whether she can trust Lance again.
7	7	"Lieutenant Bernhardt"	Laura Innes	Sal Calleros	January 13, 2017
As they struggle to save the family business, Audrey strategizes with Marius, while Otto insists on doing things his way. Confronted by Carly's discoveries, Marius pays visits to both his old mentor and his former cellmate to backstop his identity as Pete. Taylor gathers evidence about the incident that left him suspended from the force, and Winslow follows Marius' trail to Katie and her family.
8	8	"The Roll Over"	Bryan Cranston	Ian MacDonald	January 13, 2017
After discovering that Audrey risked Bernhardt Bail Bonds's future on a fraudulent investment engineered by Lance, Marius convinces her and Julia to con back the money from Lance. Unbeknownst to Audrey and Marius, Otto decides to hire a hit man to kill him so that his family can collect on his life insurance. Meanwhile, Katie and her husband Brendon (Brad William Henke) hold Winslow bound and gagged in their basement.
9	9	"The Turn"	Rosemary Rodriguez	Benjamin Cavell	January 13, 2017
Otto's plan to get himself killed goes awry, and the person who was supposed to execute Otto ends up dead at the hands of Dockery's henchman. Otto, Marius, and Lance are left at the mercy of Dockery, who wants his collateral money back. Meanwhile, Vince comes up with a new plan to catch a cheater at his table.
10	10	"The Longest Day"	Michael Dinner	Story by : Graham Yost; Teleplay by : Fred Golan	January 13, 2017
With all of the pieces in place, Marius sits down at Vince's poker table for one final con. Everything is going according to plan, until Vince becomes suspicious that he's seen this play before, stops the game, and instructs everyone else at his other poker tables to leave the premises. When Audrey finds herself involved in Winslow's death, she must go against her instincts and trust Taylor to help her manage the situation.

=== Season 2 (2018) ===
No. overall	No. in season	Title	Directed by	Written by	Original release date
11	1	"The Sinister Hotel Room Mystery"	Adam Arkin	Graham Yost	March 9, 2018
After being seized by two mercenaries who think Marius is really Pete (Ethan Embry), Marius sees an opportunity searching for Pete's mother Maggie (Jane Adams) and the eleven million dollars she stole from their employer. Meanwhile, Audrey and Otto deal with the fallout from Winslow's death, and Julia struggles to keep her promise to Dockery.
12	2	"Inside Out"	Giovanni Ribisi	Fred Golan	March 9, 2018
In order to get more information on Maggie, Marius and Marjorie (Alison Wright) take on the prison system in an attempt to free Pete. Taylor meets NYPD detective Joyce Roby, who has come to Connecticut to investigate Winslow's death. Otto and Sam do a favor for Irish Moe.
13	3	"Man on the Run"	Ami Canaan Mann	Ingrid Escajeda	March 9, 2018
Marius tries to contain the newly emancipated Pete and pump him for information on Maggie. Frank and Joe (Joseph Lyle Taylor and Desmond Harrigton respectively) tighten their grip on family surveillance. Colin, the son of the dead hit man appears, wanting to know what happened to his father. Carly tries to investigate further into Marius Josipovic. Taylor struggles to keep Roby from learning about Audrey's involvement with the Winslow case.
14	4	"Maggie"	Cherie Nowlan	Jennifer Kennedy	March 9, 2018
Marius leads Frank and Joe to Maggie's suspected hideaway in the psychic town of Rosedale, New York. Taylor and Roby head back to the scene of the Winslow crime. Otto becomes hostage to the hitman's son. Julia works a lead to find Lance and force him to cooperate in a plan to help her launder money.
15	5	"The Tower"	Jon Avnet	Sal Calleros	March 9, 2018
Marius tries to find Maggie while also trying to evade Frank and Joe. Just as Julia discovers the solution to her money problem, she finds herself in deeper trouble. A new development in the Winslow investigation starts to turn Roby in Audrey's direction. Carly seeks a connection to her parents and gets more than she bargained for.
16	6	"11 Million Reasons You Can't Go Home Again"	Laura Innes	Ian MacDonald	March 9, 2018
Maggie's return to the Bernhardt homestead leads to old family tensions resurfacing. As Marius tries to pry the location of the money from Maggie, they are grabbed by FBI agents. Taylor and Shannon's relationship begins to drift. Frustrated by their inability to find his money, Luka shows Frank and Joe that he's not playing games, and kills Joe.
17	7	"The Reluctant Taxidermist"	Helen Shaver	Adam Reid & Max Reid	March 9, 2018
With the location of the money revealed, Marius makes a bold move to snatch it all for himself, but Maggie and Luka are not so easily fooled. Taylor makes plans to frame the hitman for Winslow's murder and save Audrey. Carly turns to Maggie in search of an otherworldly connection to her parents. Julia's new bondee proves more of a challenge than she anticipated. Otto and Sam (Jay O. Sanders) find that their Colin troubles are far from over.
18	8	"Marius Josipovic"	Adam Bernstein	Story by : Graham Yost; Teleplay by : Ingrid Escajeda	March 9, 2018
Jealous of Marius' relationship with his family, Pete threatens to implode the heist unless he is granted a special request. Otto and Sam retrieve the Proclamation, but discover the larger threat that Colin poses to Julia. Audrey's suspicions about Maggie and Marius come to a head.
19	9	"Buffalo Soldiers"	Denise Di Novi	Story by : Graham Yost; Teleplay by : Sal Calleros	March 9, 2018
After Marius' "Roosevelt Buffalo" plan works too well, the heist's fate is left in Pete's hands. Carly and Audrey investigate Marius and Maggie's motives for returning to the family. Julia enlists the aid of Otto, Sam, and Lance in protecting Valerie from Colin. Taylor takes the final steps to frame the hitman for Winslow's death, and hopefully save Audrey.
20	10	"Switch"	Michael Dinner	Graham Yost & Fred Golan	March 9, 2018
Marius' plan falls apart as it becomes clear he was wrong about the money's location, and he must now face Luka's (John Ales) wrath. Julia, Valerie, Otto and Sam square off with Colin and Ayawamat at the storage facility. Audrey discovers the danger of Luka and rushes to protect her family. Roby closes the Winslow case, although she hints that she knows that Audrey must have been involved. Maggie gives Carly new information about what happened to her parents.

=== Season 3 (2019) ===
No. overall	No. in season	Title	Directed by	Written by	Original release date
21	1	"The Double Up and Back"	Jon Avnet	Blake Masters	May 10, 2019
22	2	"The Huckleberry Jones"	Jon Avnet	Jamie Pachino	May 10, 2019
23	3	"The Stamford Trust Fall"	Clare Kilner	Ed McCardie	May 10, 2019
24	4	"The Vermont Victim and the Bakersfield Hustle"	Clare Kilner	Michael Saltzman	May 10, 2019
25	5	"The Invisible Man"	Jon Avnet	Sarah Sutherland	May 10, 2019
26	6	"The California Split"	Jon Avnet	Dipika Guha	May 10, 2019
27	7	"The Little Sister"	Laura Innes	Jamie Pachino	May 10, 2019
28	8	"The Sunshine Switcheroo"	Nick Gomez	Michael Saltzman	May 10, 2019
29	9	"The Mask Drop"	Liza Johnson	Ed McCardie	May 10, 2019
30	10	"The Brooklyn Potash"	Laura Innes	Ed McCardie	May 10, 2019

== Development ==
Promotional poster.

In November 2014, CBS gave a production commitment to Sneaky Pete. A formal pilot for the show was shot in New York in March 2015. On May 8, CBS decided to pass on the pilot, while also canceling David Shore's other series on the network, Battle Creek. Just two days later, it was reported that the pilot might be moving to cable networks, with many expressing interest.

In June, it was reported that Amazon was in negotiations to pick up the pilot, with some tweaking and possible minor reshoots before being made available to the viewers. The pilot was released on Amazon on August 7, 2015 and was ordered to series on September 2, 2015.

In March 2016, it was announced that Shore would be leaving the project, and would be replaced by Graham Yost, who would be taking over as executive producer and showrunner. Start of production of the full series was pushed back to allow for the transition.

Episode 2 and the remainder of the first season premiered on January 13, 2017.

The show's title theme, "Harder Out Here", was composed and performed by The Bright Light Social Hour at the request of Bryan Cranston.

== Reception ==
=== Critical response ===
The first season of Sneaky Pete received positive reviews from critics. Rotten Tomatoes gave the first season a 97% rating, based on 31 critics’ reviews, with the critical consensus "Suspenseful, smart, and terrifically cast, Sneaky Pete is part dramedy, part crime caper, and all in all entertaining." Metacritic gave the first season a 77 out of 100 score based on 22 critic reviews.

The second season of Sneaky Pete received positive critical reviews as well. Rotten Tomatoes gave the second season a 92% rating, based on 12 critic reviews, with the critical consensus "Sneaky Pete's sophomore season replicates its predecessor's finesse with narrative sleight of hand and deliciously twisted capers."

The third season of Sneaky Pete continued to receive positive critical reviews, with Rotten Tomatoes giving it a 100% rating, based on five critic reviews.

=== Awards and nominations ===
Margo Martindale was nominated for her performance for Best Supporting Actress in a Drama Series at the 23rd Critics' Choice Awards in 2017.
