= I See You (2019 film) =

2019 film directed by Adam Randall

- Theatrical release poster
- Directed by: Adam Randall
- Screenplay by: Devon Graye
- Produced by: Matt Waldeck
- Starring: Helen Hunt; Jon Tenney; Owen Teague; Libe Barer; Judah Lewis
- Cinematography: Philipp Blaubach
- Edited by: Jeff Castelluccio
- Music by: William Arcane
- Production companies: Bankside Films; Head Gear Films; Quickfire Films; Zodiac Features
- Distributed by: Saban Films
- Release dates: March 13, 2019 (SXSW); December 6, 2019 (United States)
- Running time: 96 minutes
- Country: United States
- Language: English
- Budget: $5 million
- Box office: $1.2 million

I See You is a 2019 American horror-thrillerfilm directed by Adam Randall from a screenplay by Devon Graye. It stars Helen Hunt, Jon Tenney, and Judah Lewis. Its plot follows the sequence of strange events that begin to happen inside an investigator's family home after the case of a child who disappeared 15 years ago is reopened.

It premiered at the 2019 SXSW Film Festival and was released on December 6, 2019, to generally positive reviews.

== Plot ==
Ten-year-old Justin Whitter is abducted by an unknown force while riding his bike. Greg Harper is made the lead detective on the case, assisted by Detective Spitzky. A green pocket knife is found at the scene, connecting the crime to a series of abductions committed 15 years prior by a man named Cole Gordon, who is now imprisoned. They go to speak with Tommy Braun, one of Gordon's two surviving victims, but he becomes hysterical when he sees them.

Greg's wife, Jackie, recently had an affair, leading their only child, Connor, to resent her. Mysterious events occur in their house - items go missing, a repairman states he was let into the house by their daughter, and Greg becomes trapped in a closet while trying to catch a hamster that is somehow loose, but when Jackie frees him, Greg sees nothing blocking the door and no one else in the house.

Jackie is visited by her former lover, Todd, who claims to be in love with her and encourages her to continue their affair. Jackie attempts to amicably end things with Todd before he is hit in the head by a pot, which Jackie assumes Connor threw at him then hid. Jackie hides Todd in the basement and promises to take him to the hospital when she returns from driving Connor to school. Jackie nearly runs over Justin Whitter's mother, who is standing in the driveway, visibly frail and distressed at the disappearance of her son. Mrs. Whitter says she knows Justin is still alive and Jackie reassures her that Greg will safely return him to her.

While Jackie is gone, Todd is attacked again by a person with a bat. Jackie returns to find Todd dead and assumes Connor did it from the earlier injury. Jackie leads Greg to Todd's body and confesses that he had visited earlier that day, but insists they just talked and their affair was over. Jackie believing Connor killed him, perhaps unintentionally, tells Greg her theory. She and Greg bury him to protect Connor.

At home, Connor discovers the missing silverware wrapped in clothing in the dryer. He receives a bizarre message on his computer as a masked person appears behind him. When they arrive back, Greg and Jackie find Connor tied up in the bathtub with a green pocket knife next to him. Jackie takes Connor to the hospital.

Through flashbacks it is revealed that the mysterious happenings in the house were caused by two homeless people, Mindy and Alec, who have been hiding in the Harper home. Mindy had done this before in order to have a place to sleep, while this is Alec's first time and suggested this home to stay in for a few nights. Mindy stays hidden while the family is present but Alec decides to make them think they are going insane despite her warnings. Alec is revealed to be the one to take items, mess with the TV remote, locked Greg in a closet, and made Greg believe he peed himself in his sleep by peeing on him.

Mindy witnesses Todd get murdered, where the assailant is revealed to be Greg. When Greg and Jackie go to bury Todd, she goes to tell Alec they need to leave only to see Alec tying up Connor. She threatens to call the police, but he accidentally pushes her down the stairs before hiding her unconscious body in Greg's car. He plans to drive Greg's car but the couple returns home before he can. After Jackie leaves to take Connor to the hospital, Greg also drives away, unknowingly taking Mindy with him.

When Mindy awakens, she discovers multiple green pocket knives and Justin's shirt while searching Greg's bag and realizes he is the kidnapper. When he parks in the forest, she sneaks out and calls 911, but the broken conversation is cut off from the unstable connection. She comes across an old trailer where Justin and another missing boy are trapped and begging for help. As she tries to free them, Greg knocks her out, takes her home, and fatally shoots her. He makes it look like she was trying to attack him and he was defending himself. Greg is attacked by Alec but believes he knocked Alec out, then stabs himself to make it seem like he was attacked by both. Alec regains consciousness and confronts Greg with his own gun. Greg attempts to justify his actions revealing that he was also a victim as a child, but Alec immediately rebukes him and fatally shoots Greg.

Greg's Lieutenant gets news of the 911 call and can't get ahold of Greg, so Spitzky does to find out why. Spitzky arrives, sees a dead Greg, and shoots Alec in the shoulder. But the two realize that they recognize each other as Spitzky investigates the scene. Jackie and Connor arrive to find their home swarming with police. Spitzky discovers the bag of evidence in Greg's car and the two boys are rescued by the 911 call following the GPS signal where Mindy had called. As Alec is carried to an ambulance, flashbacks show a younger Alec Travers and Tommy Braun encountering Greg, revealing that Alec was Greg's other kidnapped survivor, and he targeted Greg's home to get revenge and stop him.

== Cast ==
- Helen Hunt as Jackie Harper
- Jon Tenney as Greg Harper
- Owen Teague as Alec Travers
- Judah Lewis as Connor Harper
- Libe Barer as Mindy
- Gregory Alan Williams as Spitzky
- Erika Alexander as Lieutenant Moriah Davis
- Allison King as Officer Grace Caleb
- Adam Kern as Window Repairman
- Jeremy Gladen as Tommy Braun
- Teri Clark as Mrs. Braun
- Nicole Forester as Mrs. Whitter
- Sam Trammell makes an uncredited appearance as Todd.

== Production ==
Helen Hunt joined the cast in June 2017. Principal photography took place in May 2018 around Chagrin Falls, Cleveland and Lakewood, Ohio.

== Release ==
The film had its world premiere at the SXSW Film Festival, in the Midnighters section, on March 13, 2019. It was released in theaters by Saban Films on December 6, 2019, and on VOD by Cinema Epoch Video on December 3, 2019.

== Reception ==
=== Box office ===
I See You grossed $1.2 million worldwide against a production budget of $5 million.

=== Viewership ===
According to U.S. streaming data reported by Media Play News using figures from PlumResearch, I See You registered 6.0 million unique viewers on Netflix during the week ending April 2, 2023, with an average time spent of 72 minutes.

=== Critical response ===
On the review aggregator website Rotten Tomatoes, 73% of 45 critics' reviews are positive. The website's consensus reads: "I See You gets tripped up on its own narrative contortions, but a solid cast and an effective blend of scares and suspense make this slow-building mystery worth watching." Metacritic, which uses a weighted average, assigned the film a score of 65 out of 100, based on 8 critics, indicating "generally favorable" reviews.

Dennis Harvey of Variety described the film as "an eerie suspense exercise that starts out looking like a supernatural tale — one of several viewer presumptions this cleverly engineered narrative eventually pulls the rug out from under." Stephen Dalton of The Hollywood Reporter stated, "I See You is such a finely crafted exercise in slow-burn suspense that its loopy plot contortions only seem absurd in retrospect," and elaborated, "actor turned first-time screenwriter Devon Graye's tricksy script keeps audiences on their toes with all this multi-viewpoint misdirection, so much so that most will be caught off-guard by further major reveals." Kevin Maher of The Times gave it a score of 4/5, writing, "The director's smartest achievement, however, is the way that he shifts the narrative emphasis around, frequently via plot twists, minor and major."

Nick Allen of RogerEbert.com gave the film 1.5/4 stars, writing, "It would be impossible to guess the ending of I See You during its tiresome first act, which is something numerous films can’t tout, but the movie uses cheap tricks to earn that kudos." Meagan Navarro of Bloody Disgusting gave it a score of 2.5/5, saying, "It’s a great concept that’s well produced and is anchored by a talented cast. The big picture narrative is also thrilling and teases so much potential. But because the story’s unique structure is given so much time and attention, everything else is diminished in the process."

== See also ==
- List of horror films of 2019
- List of thriller films of the 2010s
- List of mystery films
