= The Surrender =

2025 film directed by Julia Max

- Film poster
- Directed by: Julia Max
- Written by: Julia Max
- Starring: Colby Minifie; Kate Burton
- Distributed by: Shudder
- Release date: March 9, 2025
- Running time: 96 minutes
- Country: Canada
- Language: English

The Surrender is a 2025 Canadian supernatural horror film written and directed by Julia Max, starring Colby Minifie and Kate Burton.

== Premise ==
Robert, a family patriarch, is ill and bedridden, and is looked after by his wife Barbara and daughter Megan. After Robert dies, Barbara enlists the help of a mysterious figure to bring Robert back to life by means of an occult ritual.

== Cast ==
- Colby Minifie as Megan
  - Alaina Pollack as Young Megan
- Kate Burton as Barbara
  - Chelsea Alden as Young Barbara
- Vaughn Armstrong as Robert
  - Pete Ploszek as Young Robert
- Riley Rose Critchlow as Lacey
- Mia Ellis as Nikki
- Neil Sandilands as The Man

== Release ==
The Surrender was released in the United States on March 9, 2025 at the South by Southwest Film & TV Festival.

== Reception ==
On the review aggregator website Rotten Tomatoes, 85% of 40 critics' reviews are positive. The website's consensus reads: "Extracting a maximum amount of creepy mood from a simple setup while reaching surprising poignancy as a mother-daughter story, The Surrender is a victorious feature debut from writer-director Julia Max." Metacritic, which uses a weighted average, assigned the film a score of 66 out of 100, based on 5 critics, indicating "generally favorable" reviews.

Simon Abrams, writing for RogerEbert.com, gave the movie 3 stars out of 4, praising the performances and calling it "an eerie and accomplished gut-muncher that also happens to have grief and mother-daughter trauma on its mind." Shaina Weatherhead, writing for Collider, said that the film is "unafraid to take risks" and "ultimately delivers a fraught family drama replete with gag-inducing body horror and a whole lot of blood."
