= Chelsea Alden =

American actress

- Born: April 7, 1988 (age 37); Southern California, U.S.
- Education: Professional Performing Arts School
- Occupation: Actress
- Website: chelseaalden.com

Chelsea Alden is an American actress, known for her roles in 13 Reasons Why, American Horror Story: Roanoke, The Tale, and Unfriended: Dark Web. Alden also appeared in an episode of Veep.

== Filmography ==
=== Film ===
Year	Title	Role	Notes
2012	Pause	Lily	
2016	Face 2 Face	Ella	
2017	Where's the Money	Sorority Girl #1	
2018	The Tale	Samantha	
2018	Unfriended: Dark Web	Kelly	
2020	Disfluency	Amber	
2021	Rosé All Day	Olivia Harper	
2022	Piece	Wife	Short film
2023	Sweet On You	Bree	TV film
2024	The Mood Swing	Nancy	Short film
2025	The Surrender	Young Barbara	
TBA	The Aftertaste	Carol	

=== Television ===
Year	Title	Role	Notes
2004	Grounded for Life	Friend	Episode: "Day Tripper"
2009	iCarly	Giggling Girl	Episode: "iMove Out"
2011–2012	Unintentionally Awesome	Ginger McMill	3 episodes
2012	White Collar	Owen's Girl, the Waitress	2 episodes
2013	The Mentalist	Young Holly	Episode: "The Red Barn"
2013	Bona Fide	Ily	Episode: "Ily"
2013	Squaresville	Angie	Episode: "Beautiful Manga Aisle Forever"
2013	Red Scare	Irene Miller	8 episodes
2013	The Online Gamer	Katie	8 episodes
2014	Necrolectric	Z	2 episodes
2015	About a Boy	Assistant	Episode: "About a Manniversary"
2015	Jane the Virgin	Winnie	Episode: "Chapter Twenty-One"
2015–2016	Get Spy	Samantha Casey	12 episodes
2016	Cooper Barrett's Guide to Surviving Life	Young Woman	Episode: "How to Survive Your Loveable Jackass"
2016	The People v. O. J. Simpson: American Crime Story	Kato's Fan 1	Episode: "The Dream Team"
2016	American Horror Story: Roanoke	Alissa	3 episodes
2017	Speechless	Cashier	Episode: "D-I - DING"
2017	Veep	Renee Holt	Episode: "Library"
2017	Blake & Emily Get Famous	Emily	3 episodes
2017	Grey's Anatomy	Danielle Gordon	Episode: "Come on Down to My Boat, Baby"
2017	The Ranch	Brittany	Episode: "Wrapped Up in You"
2018	NCIS	Stephanie Vairo	Episode: "Date with Destiny"
2018–2019	13 Reasons Why	Mackenzie	13 episodes
2019	I'm Sorry	Diana Ross	Episode: "Miss Diana Ross"
2019	The Wasteland	Kimberly	Episode: "Matchmaker"
2020	The Good Doctor	Kayley Parker	Episode: "Influence"
2020	Laps Around the Sun	Sheri	Post-production
2021	Shameless	Tish	3 episodes
2021	Good Girls	Penny	Episode: "The Banker"
2021	9-1-1	Keisha	Episode: "Treasure Hunt"
