= Jessica Sorensen =

American novelist

Jessica Sorensen is an American novelist. Her novel The Secret of Ella and Micha was featured in the USA Today Bestseller List and was responsible for creating a new wave of New-adult fiction. Sorensen also wrote the fantasy series The Fallen Star and Darkness Falls. The books in her The Coincidence series are also bestsellers.

== Writings ==
=== The Coincidence series ===
- The Coincidence of Callie & Kayden (2012)
- The Redemption of Callie and Kayden (2013)
- The Destiny of Violet and Luke (2014)
- The Probability of Violet and Luke (2014)
- The Certainty of Violet and Luke (2014)
- The Resolution of Callie and Kayden (2014)
- Seth and Greyson (2015)

=== The Secret series ===
- The Prelude of Ella and Micha (2014)
- The Secret of Ella and Micha (2012)
- The Forever of Ella and Micha (2013)
- The Temptation of Lila and Ethan (2013)
- The Ever After of Ella and Micha (2013)
- Lila and Ethan: Forever and Always (2013)
- Ella and Micha: Infinitely & Always (2014)

=== Nova series ===
- Breaking Nova (2013)
- Saving Quinton (2014)
- Delilah: The Making of Red (2014)
- Nova and Quinton: No Regrets (2014)
- Tristan: Finding Hope (2014)
- Wreck Me (2014)
- Ruin Me (2015)

=== Unraveling You series ===
- Unraveling You (2014)
- Raveling You (2015)
- Awakening You (2015)
- Inspiring You (2015)

=== Unbeautiful series ===
- Unbeautiful (2014)
- Untamed (2014)

=== Darkness Falls ===
- Darkness Falls (2012)
- Darkness Breaks (2012)
- Darkness Fades (Sept 2013)

=== Fallen Star ===
- The Fallen Star (2011)
- The Underworld (2011)
- The Vision (2011)
- The Promise (2012)
- The Lost Soul (2012)
- The Evanescence (2012)
- The Mist of Stars (2020)

=== Shattered Promises ===
- Shattered Promises (2013)
- Fractured Souls (2013)
- Unbroken (2013)
- Broken Visions (2014)
- Scattered Ashes (2015)

=== Death Collectors ===
- Ember (2013)
- Cinder (2013)
- Spark (2015)

=== Death Collectors X ===
- Ember X (2013)
- Cinder X (2013)
- Spark X (2015)

=== Standalones ===
- The Forgotten Girl (2014)
