= Jennifer L. Armentrout =

American author

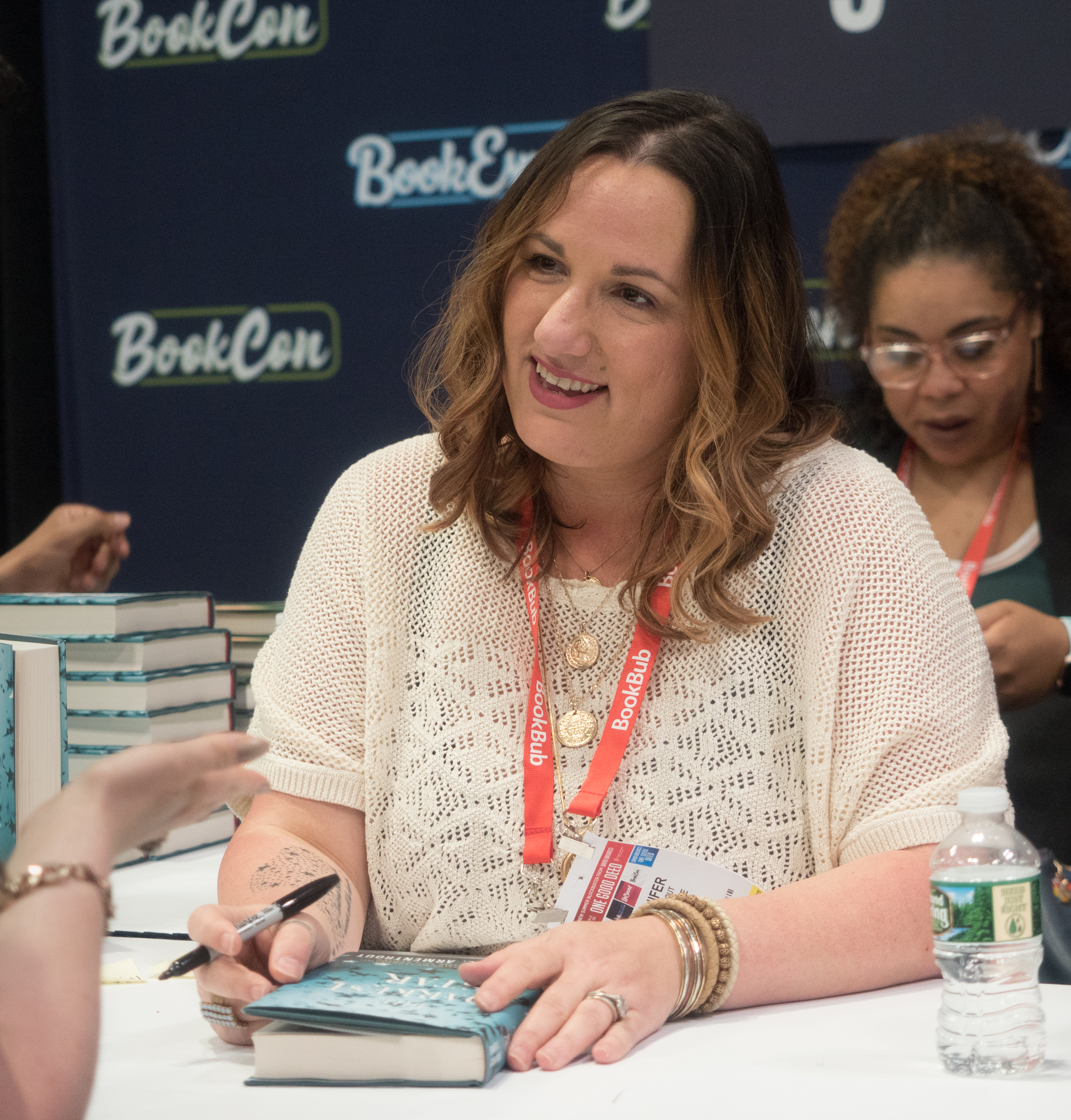
- Jennifer Armentrout at BookCon in 2019
- Born: Jennifer Lynn Armentrout; June 11, 1980 (age 46); Martinsburg, West Virginia, U.S.
- Occupation: Novelist
- Writing career
- Pen name: J. Lynn
- Period: 2011–present
- Genres: Fantasy; Romance; New Adult
- Notable works: Blood and Ash series, The Problem with Forever
- Notable awards: RITA award – Young Adult Romance; 2017 The Problem with Forever
- Website: www.jenniferlarmentrout.com

Jennifer Lynn Armentrout (born June 11, 1980), also known by the pseudonym J. Lynn, is an American writer of contemporary romance, new adult and fantasy. Several of her works have made The New York Times Best Seller list.

She is considered a "hybrid" author, having successfully self-published while maintaining active contracts with small independent presses, and traditional publishers. Her current publishers include Spencer Hill Press, Entangled Publishing, Harlequin Teen, Disney/Hyperion, and HarperCollins.

Not be confused with fellow novelist Jenny Gallifrey Joel Trout, who was born Jennifer Lynne Armintrout, also in 1980.

== Early life ==
Jennifer Lynn Armentrout was born in West Virginia. She was inspired to become a writer after reading the works of L.J. Smith, including The Vampire Diaries, The Secret Circle Series, The Forbidden Games Series, and myriad others. The book series that remained close to her heart was The Forbidden Games, with the final novel bringing her to tears. Upon completing the series she decided she wanted to leave the same impact on her future readers.

Her first experience with writing an actual novel was in high school during algebra class. Despite her desire to be an author, she went to college and graduated with a major in psychology.

== Career ==
Despite receiving a great deal of rejections before her career began, Armentrout's first book was published in 2011. As of September 2019, she had fifty-three of her fifty-seven total written works published. The majority of her published works for young adults are romance, fantasy and paranormal, and some contemporary and science fiction. With her pseudonym J. Lynn, she writes suspenseful romance novels for her adult readers.

In 2013, her young adult novel Obsidian was optioned by Sierra Pictures, but the rights were later returned to the author.

In 2015, Armentrout's colleague suggested that she do a book signing for the first release in her Titan series. She was opposed to doing a lonely and awkward book signing, so she asked authors to come join her in the daylong event. After this, Armentrout created ApollyCon, which rapidly became a new way for authors and readers to come together in celebration of recently released books. The convention's success continues to grow with each event.

She is a #1 New York Times and a USA Today Best Seller. She has published books independently and with publishing companies, earning the title of being a "hybrid" author.

In 2025, her novel Storm and Fury tied for the eighth most banned and challenged book in the United States.

== Personal life ==
Armentrout was diagnosed with retinitis pigmentosa in 2015. She has become passionate about teaching readers about it by being representative and spreading awareness. She also enjoys being a source of support for her readers that share the same disorder.

As of 2020, Armentrout lives with her husband, her dog Apollo, and her alpacas on a farm in Martinsburg, West Virginia.

She likes writing stories for both age groups to prevent writer burnout. Armentrout has said she writes for eight hours a day almost every day. During the creative process, she likes to alternate between typing and handwriting so she can avoid writer's block.

== Publications ==
=== Books written under Jennifer L. Armentrout ===
==== Covenant series ====
- Daimon (novella, prequel to Half-Blood) (2011)
- Half-Blood (2011)
- Pure ( 2012)
- Deity (2012)
- Elixir (novella, prequel to Apollyon) (2012)
- Apollyon (2013)
- Sentinel (2013)

==== Titan Series (Spin-Off to Covenant) ====
- The Return (2015)
- The Power (2016)
- The Struggle (2017)
- The Prophecy (2018)

==== Lux series ====
- Shadows (novella, prequel to Obsidian) (2012)
- Obsidian (2011)
- Onyx (2012)
- Opal (2012)
- Origin (2013)
- Opposition (2014)
- Oblivion (2015)

==== Arum novel (Lux spin-off) ====
- Obsession (2013)

==== Origin series (Lux spin-off) ====
- The Darkest Star (2018)
- The Burning Shadow (2019)
- The Brightest Night (2020)
- The Fevered Winter (TBA)

==== The Dark Elements series ====
- Bitter Sweet Love (prequel novella) (2013)
- White Hot Kiss (2014)
- Stone Cold Touch (2014)
- Every Last Breath (2015)

==== The Harbinger series (Dark Elements spin off) ====
- Storm and Fury (2019)
- Rage and Ruin (2020)
- Grace and Glory (2021)

==== Wicked trilogy ====
- Wicked (2014)
- Torn (2016)
- Brave (2017)
- The Prince (A 1001 Dark Nights Novella) (2018)
- The King (A 1001 Dark Nights Novella) (2019)
- The Queen (A 1001 Dark Nights Novella) (2020)
- The Summer King (Novella Collection) (2020)

==== Blood and Ash series ====
- From Blood And Ash (2020)
- A Kingdom of Flesh and Fire (2020)
- The Crown of Gilded Bones (2021)
- The War of Two Queens (2022)
- A Soul of Ash and Blood (2023)
- The Primal of Blood and Bone (2025)
- The Throne of Bone and Ash (2027)

==== Flesh and Fire series (Spin-off and prequel to Blood and Ash) ====
- A Shadow in the Ember (2021)
- A Light in the Flame (2022)
- A Fire in the Flesh (2023)
- Born of Blood and Ash (2024)

==== Blood and Ash and Flesh and Fire companion ====
- Visions of Flesh and Blood: A Blood and Ash/Flesh and Fire compendium (2024) (co-written with Rayvn Salvador)
- A Crown of Ruin (Novella) (2025)

==== Awakening series ====
- Fall of Ruin and Wrath (2023)

==== de Vincent series ====
- Moonlight Sins (2018)
- Moonlight Seduction (2018)
- Moonlight Scandals (2019)

==== Standalone novels ====
- Cursed (2012)
- Unchained- Nephilim Rising (2013)
- Don't Look Back (2014)
- The Dead List (2015)
- The Problem with Forever (2016)
- Till Death (2017)
- If There's No Tomorrow (2017)

Anthologies

- Meet Cute
- Life Inside My Mind
- Fifty First Times

=== Books written under her pen name J. Lynn ===
==== Gamble Brothers series ====
- Tempting the Best Man (2012)
- Tempting the Player (2012)
- Tempting the Bodyguard (2014)

==== Wait for You series ====
- Wait for You (2013)
- Trust in Me (2013)
- Be With Me (2014)
- Believe in Me (Short Story in Fifty First Times Anthology) (2014)
- The Proposal (Short Story) (2014)
- Stay With Me (2014)
- Fall With Me (2015)
- Dream of You (A 1001 Dark Nights Novella) (2015)
- Forever With You (2015)
- Fire in You (2016)

==== Frigid series ====
- Frigid (2013)
- Scorched (2015)

== Awards and reception ==
Awards for Jennifer L. Armentrout
Year	Nominated work	Category	Award	Result	Notes	Ref.
2017	The Problem with Forever	Young Adult Romance	Romance Writers of America RITA Award	Won		
