= Jenny Gallifrey Joel Trout =

American author

- Born: Jennifer Lynne Armintrout; July 15, 1980 (age 46)
- Occupation: Novelist
- Writing career
- Pen name: Abigail Barnette, Jennifer Armintrout, Jenny Trout
- Genres: Urban Fantasy, fantasy, drama, romance, erotic romance
- Website: jennytrout.com

Jenny Gallifrey Joel Trout (née Jennifer Lynne Armintrout; born July 15, 1980) is an American writer best known for a series of urban fantasy novels known as the Blood Ties series, published by Mira Books. The books chronicle the life of Dr. Carrie Ames, an emergency room doctor who must adapt to life as a vampire after being attacked by one of her patients. Armintrout's Blood Ties series has been published in five countries, with the first volume making USA Today's top 150 book list. Trout also publishes erotica under the pseudonym Abigail Barnette.

In 2015, Trout officially changed her legal name from Jennifer Lynne Armintrout to Jenny Gallifrey Joel Trout in part to avoid being confused with similarly named novelist Jennifer L. Armentrout, also born in 1980. She chose Gallifrey after the fictional planet of the same name from the science fiction TV series Doctor Who.

== Reception ==
Reception to Trout's work has been mixed to positive, with Romantic Times giving her work mostly four stars. Publishers Weekly positively reviewed The Turning, calling it "a squirm-inducing treat", but stating that while American Vampire had an "unusual premise, there's not much to distinguish this from other dark paranormal romances".

== Bibliography ==
=== Blood Ties series ===
1. The Turning (2006)
2. Possession (2007)
3. Ashes to Ashes (2007)
4. All Souls' Night (2008)

=== Lightworld/Darkworld series ===
1. Queene of Light (2009)
2. Child of Darkness (2009)
3. Veil of Shadows (2009)

=== The Boss series (as Abigail Barnette) ===
1. The Boss (2013)
2. The Girlfriend (2013)
3. The Bride (2014)
4. The Hook-Up (2014)
5. The Ex (2014)
6. The Baby (2015)
7. The Sister (2017)
8. The Boyfriend (2018)
9. Sophie (2021)

=== Standalone novels ===
1. American Vampire (2011)
2. Such Sweet Sorrow (as Jenny Trout) (2014)
3. Say Goodbye to Hollywood (as Jenny Trout) (2017)
4. Where We Land (as Abigail Barnette) (2019)
