= Briana Cuoco =

American actress and singer (born 1988)

- Born: Briana Justine Cuoco; November 29, 1988 (age 37); Ventura, California, U.S.
- Other name: Bri Cuoco
- Occupations: Actress; singer; choreographer
- Years active: 2001–present
- Spouse: Brian Logan Dales (m. 2024)
- Relatives: Kaley Cuoco (sister)
- Website: www.brianacuoco.com

Briana Justine Cuoco (/ˈkwoʊkoʊ/ KWOH-koh; born November 29, 1988) is an American actress, singer, and choreographer.

== Early life ==
Briana Justine Cuoco was born on November 29, 1988, in Ventura, California, and grew up in Camarillo, California. She is the younger daughter of Layne Ann (née Wingate), a homemaker, and Gary Carmine Cuoco, a realtor. Her sister, Kaley, is an actress and producer who played Penny on The Big Bang Theory. The sisters have Italian ancestry through their father while their mother is of English and German descent.

== Career ==
Cuoco began her acting career in 2001, starring in an episode of The Nightmare Room as Nikki. In 2012, Cuoco starred in the spin-off web series of The Lizzie Bennet Diaries, The Lydia Bennet as Mary Bennet, and reprised her role in an episode of the main series. Since 2012, Cuoco has choreographed three flash mob routines for the cast and crew of The Big Bang Theory. In 2015, Cuoco starred in the romance-comedy Beauty in the Broken as Pele Peterson, starring alongside Chris Payne Gilbert and Lisa Marie.

In December 2019, it was announced that Cuoco would voice multiple characters in the DC Universe/HBO Max/Max adult animation Harley Quinn, which is executive produced by and stars Cuoco's sister, Kaley. From 2020 to 2022, Cuoco had a recurring role as Cecilia in the comedy drama mystery thriller The Flight Attendant, which is also executive produced by and stars Cuoco's sister. In February 2021, it was announced that Cuoco would star in the comedy film, Rosé All Day, written by Katie Amanda Keane and directed by Marla Sokoloff. In November 2022, it was announced that Cuoco would star in the Netflix series Dead Boy Detectives as the character Jenny. The series premiered on Netflix on April 25, 2024, and ran for one season.

=== The Voice ===
On September 24, 2013, it was announced that Cuoco would be competing in season 5 of NBC's singing competition, The Voice. At the blind auditions on September 30, 2013, Cuoco performed Lady Gaga's "You and I", persuading CeeLo Green and Christina Aguilera to turn their chairs. Cuoco chose Aguilera to be her coach.

In the Battle rounds, Cuoco was paired with Jacquie Lee where they sang the song "The House of the Rising Sun", with Cuoco losing to Lee. After the loss, Cuoco had the option to be stolen by CeeLo Green and Blake Shelton, and was stolen by Shelton. In the Knockouts round, Cuoco was paired against Shelbie Z, singing the song "Don't Speak". Cuoco lost to Shelbie and was ultimately eliminated from the competition on October 28, 2013.

== Personal life ==
In 2021, Cuoco began dating The Summer Set's lead vocalist, Brian Logan Dales. They became engaged on September 12, 2023, and were married on December 31, 2024.

== Filmography ==
=== Film ===
Year	Title	Role	Notes
2015	Beauty in the Broken	Pele Peterson	
2022	The Secret Life of College Escorts	Serena	
2022	BLUR: A HuMech Story	Audrey Finley	Short film
2022	Rosé All Day	Chloe Stokes	

=== Television ===
Year	Title	Role	Notes
2001	The Nightmare Room	Nikki	Episode: "Tangled Web"
2012	The Newsroom	Neal's Girl	Episode: "The 112th Congress"
2012	The Lydia Bennet!!	Mary Bennet	14 episodes
2012	The Lizzie Bennet Diaries	Mary Bennet	Episode: "Party Time"
2013	The Big Bang Theory	Gretchen	Episode: "The Tangible Affection Proof"
2013	The Mentalist	Maggie	Episode: "Behind the Red Curtain"
2013	The Voice	Herself	Season 5 contestant
2017	Mom	Tabitha	Episode: "A Seafaring Ancestor and a Bloomin' Onion"
2018	Criminal Minds	Janice Fox	Episode: "The Dance of Love"
2019	The Bold and the Beautiful	Tyler	Season 33, Episode 17
2019	NCIS	Rosalind	Episode: "IRL"
2020–present	Harley Quinn	Barbara Gordon / Batgirl / Oracle, Girl 2, Goth Chick, Hostess	Voice, main role
2020–2022	The Flight Attendant	Cecilia	Recurring role
2021	Curb Your Enthusiasm	Female Employee #1	Episode: "The Mini Bar"
2023	With Love	Ana	2 episodes
2024	Dead Boy Detectives	Jenny Green	Main role
2024	Based on a True Story	Park mom	2 episodes
