= Rosé All Day =

2022 film by Marla Sokoloff

- Film poster
- Directed by: Marla Sokoloff
- Screenplay by: Katie Amanda Keane
- Produced by: Corey Moss; Brad T. Gottfred
- Starring: Chelsea Alden; Veronica Dunne; Jenna Ushkowitz; Alice Hunter; Briana Cuoco; Cameron Kelly
- Cinematography: Chloe Weaver
- Edited by: Jennifer Reilly
- Music by: Alec Puro
- Production companies: Bold Soul Studios; Attic Light Films
- Release date: November 11, 2022
- Running time: 78 minutes
- Country: United States
- Language: English

Rosé All Day is an American comedy film written by Katie Amanda Keane and directed by Marla Sokoloff (in her theatrical film directing debut). The film stars Chelsea Alden, Veronica Dunne, Jenna Ushkowitz, Alice Hunter, Briana Cuoco and Cameron Kelly. The film was released on November 11, 2022.

== Cast ==
- Chelsea Alden as Olivia Harper
- Veronica Dunne as Gwen Glenn
- Jenna Ushkowitz as Kelly Motley
- Alice Hunter as Paige Fuller
- Briana Cuoco as Chloe Stokes
- Cameron Kelly as Morgan Davis
- Avery Norris as Natalie Mansfield

== Production ==
On February 2, 2021, it was announced that Chelsea Alden, Jenna Ushkowitz and Briana Cuoco joined the cast of the film.

The film was set to start production in February 2021, but was delayed due to COVID-19 concerns. Principal photography began in March 2021 and expected to conclude a month later in Encino, California.
