= Starfish (2018 film) =

- Directed by: A.T. White
- Written by: A.T. White
- Produced by: Aida Bernal
- Starring: Virginia Gardner
- Cinematography: Alberto Bañares
- Edited by: Alex Elkins; A.T. White
- Music by: A.T. White
- Release date: 2018
- Running time: 1h 41m
- Language: English

Starfish is a 2018 science fiction horror film directed by A.T. White and starring Virginia Gardner. It was an official selection of Brooklyn Horror Film Festival.

== Inspiration ==
White saw a screening of Monsters at FrightFest and met director Gareth Edwards, who encouraged him to make a short film on a digital camera (for which he is thanked in the credits of Starfish). The screenplay was written in reaction to White going through a divorce and his best friend dying of cancer.

== Plot ==
After her close friend Grace dies, a grieving Aubrey breaks into Grace's old home and squats there. She falls asleep, experiencing strange dreams, then wakes up to find that her small town has been attacked by mysterious alien creatures.

An unknown person contacts her via a walkie talkie and tells her that Grace discovered a signal that triggered this event. Aubrey finds cassette tapes that include messages from Grace saying that she has hidden the rest of the tapes. Aubrey experiences more cryptic visions and looks for the remaining tapes. Following the visions, Aubrey visits places such as the grocery store, library, and cinema. She avoids aggressive aliens and mutated humans throughout her search.

Eventually, Aubrey finds all the tapes and takes them to a radio station at the top of a hill. Using the broadcast equipment, she plays them simultaneously in hope of closing the dimensional gate. However, the voice on the walkie talkie informs her that she actually opened the doors even further, thus dooming the world.

Aubrey goes outside the radio station, enters an antigravity field caused by the dimensional gate, and floats up into it.

== Cast ==
- Virginia Gardner as Aubrey
- Christina Masterson as Grace

== Production ==
Filmed in and around Leadville, Colorado, for the town's high elevation and winter setting.

== Reception ==
Starfish has an 89% critics' score on Rotten Tomatoes, based on 63 reviews and a Metacritic score of 74 based on 6 reviews.
