= Dylan Arnold =

American actor (born 1994)

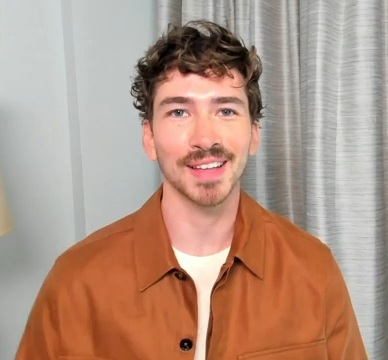
- Born: February 11, 1994 (age 32); Seattle, Washington, U.S.
- Education: University of North Carolina School of the Arts (BFA)
- Occupation: Actor
- Years active: 2010–present

Dylan Arnold (born February 11, 1994) is an American actor. He is known for playing Noah in the romantic drama After (2019), and its sequel After We Collided (2020), Cameron Elam in Halloween (2018), and its sequel, Halloween Kills (2021), Theo Engler in You (2021), and Frank Oppenheimer in Oppenheimer (2023). On stage, he portrayed Justin in Roberto Aguirre-Sacasa's Good Boys and True at the Pasadena Playhouse in 2019.

== Early life ==
Born on February 11, 1994 in Seattle, Washington, Arnold grew up on Bainbridge Island, Washington. He attended the University of North Carolina School of the Arts.

== Career ==
In November 2020, Arnold was cast in the main role of Theo Engler for the third season of the Netflix psychological thriller series You.

== Filmography ==
=== Film ===
Year	Title	Role	Notes
2010	Shortcomings	Jared Boy	Short film
2010	On the Brightside	Clark	Short film
2011	Rockstars: The Pete Weaver Experience	Pete Weaver	Short film
2012	Fat Kid Rules the World	Dayle	
2013	Helpless	Chayse	Short film
2014	Laggies	Patrick	
2014	4 Minute Mile	Eric Whitehall	
2015	7 Minutes	Johnny	
2017	Mudbound	Carl Atwood	
2017	Sweet Nothing	Chris	Short film
2018	Halloween	Cameron Elam	
2018	Disfluency	Mark	Short film
2019	After	Noah Porter	
2019	Adventure Force 5	Nolan Seturmer	
2019	Abnormal Cells Make Pretty Flowers	Otis	Short film
2019	Come Be Creepy With Us	Dean	Short film
2020	After We Collided	Noah Porter	
2021	Halloween Kills	Cameron Elam	
2021	Disfluency	Jordan	
2022	(Manic)quin	Beaver	Short film
2023	Oppenheimer	Frank Oppenheimer	
2024	1992	Dennis	

=== Television ===
Year	Title	Role	Notes
2017	When We Rise	Young Gilbert Baker	Episode: "Night II: Parts II and III"
2017, 2019	S.W.A.T.	Whip	2 episodes
2018	Nashville	Twig Wysecki	8 episodes
2018	The Purge	Henry Bodreaux	3 episodes
2019	Into the Dark	Hank/Michael	2 episodes
2020	Trish & Scott	Chris	2 episodes
2021	You	Theo Engler	Main cast (Season 3)
2024	Lady in the Lake	Stephen Zawadzkie	Limited series, 6 episodes
2026	Adults	Greg	1 episode

=== Podcast ===
Year	Title	Role	Notes
2022	Zaya	Thierry	2 episodes
