= New adult fiction =

Fiction with protagonists aged 18–29

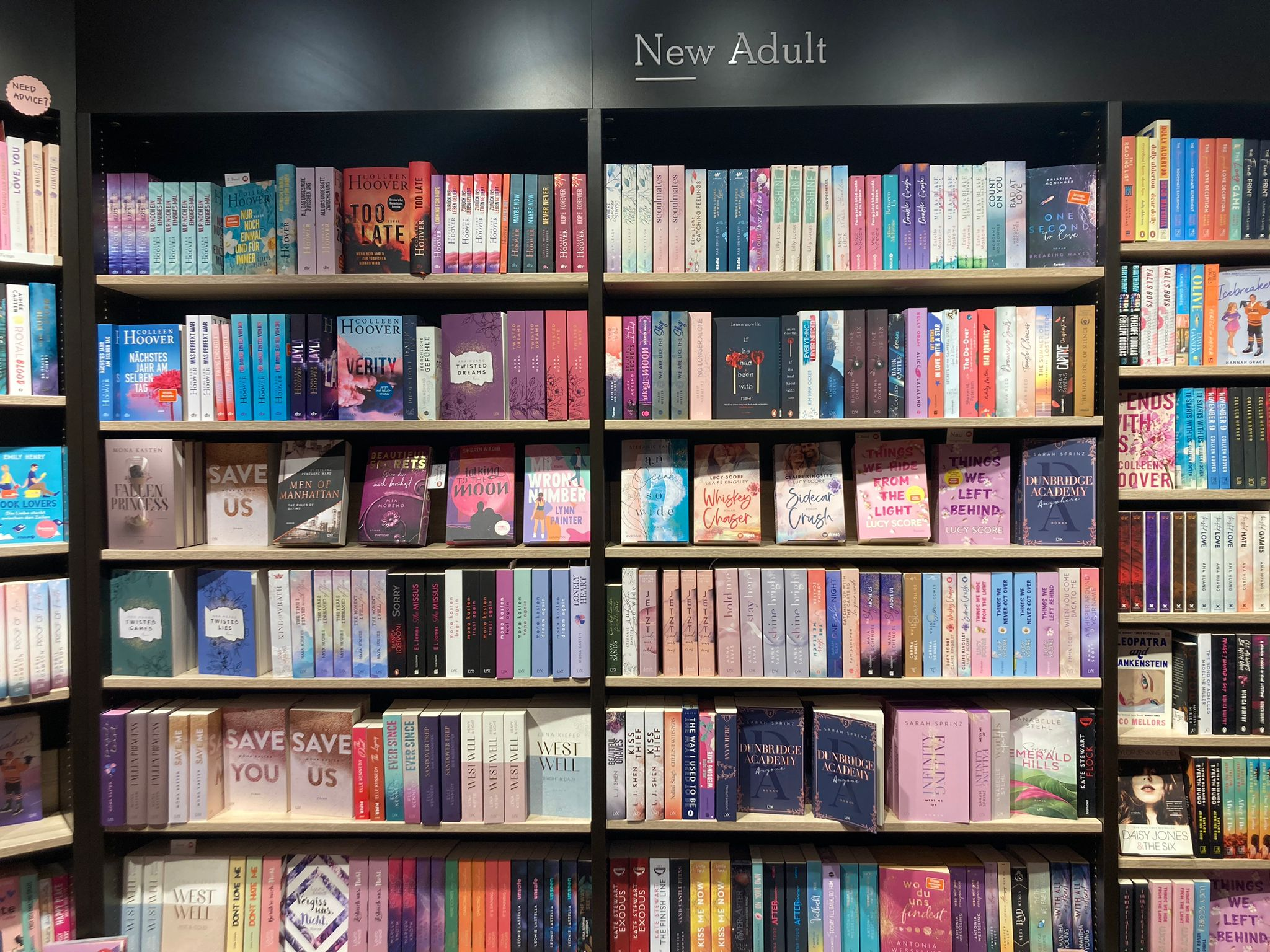
Department with new-adult books in a German bookstore (2023)

New adult (NA) fiction is a developing genre of fiction with protagonists in the 18–29 age bracket. St. Martin's Press coined the term in 2009, when they held a special call for "fiction similar to young adult fiction (YA) that can be published and marketed as adult—a sort of an 'older YA' or 'new adult'". New adult fiction tends to focus on issues such as leaving home, developing sexuality, and negotiating education and career choices. The genre has gained popularity rapidly over the last few years, particularly through books by self-published bestselling authors such as Jennifer L. Armentrout, Cora Carmack, Colleen Hoover, Anna Todd, and Jamie McGuire.

The genre originally faced criticism, as some viewed it as a marketing scheme, while others claimed the readership was not there to publish the material. In contrast, others claimed the term was necessary; a publicist for HarperCollins described it as "a convenient label because it allows parents and bookstores and interested readers to know what is inside".

Examples of books in the new adult genre include Sarah J. Maas's A Court of Thorns and Roses and Throne of Glass, Jennifer L. Armentrout's Wait for You and Blood and Ash series, Jamie McGuire's Beautiful Disaster, Colleen Hoover's Slammed, Cora Carmack's Losing It, Kendall Ryan's The Impact of You and Casey McQuiston's Red, White & Royal Blue.

== Marketing ==
This category is intended to be marketed to post-adolescents and young adults ages 18 to 29. This age group is considered to be the lucrative "cross-over" category of young-adult titles that appeal to both the young-adult market and to an adult audience.

== Controversies ==
=== Publishing industry ===
Many agents and large publishing houses have yet to recognize the category due to various issues. Some view the category as a marketing scheme, while others claim the readership is not there to publish the material. Therefore, authors have turned to self-publishing as a means to get their books out into the market. The success of these authors has led to many independent publishing houses and agents opening up to the category. Publishers are now publishing these books with many of the bestsellers having deals with large publishers.

=== Sex ===
In 2012, new adult fiction saw a rise in the romance subgenre of contemporary when self-published titles such as Slammed by Colleen Hoover, Easy by Tamarra Webber, and Beautiful Disaster by Jamie McGuire were acquired by major publishing houses. Some believe this jump in response to the category came from the release of the popular erotic novel Fifty Shades of Grey, which featured a heroine in college. Since new adult fiction tackles issues such as sex and sexuality and many of the categories' successful titles deal with those same issues the category itself and the single issue of sex have been stated as synonymous, and even been called over-sexualized versions of young adult fiction. In 2012 and 2013, both readers and authors of the category responded to the claim by stating that the category deals with the exploration of a character's life, and feel that sex is not ubiquitous in new adult titles.

== 2009 to present ==
Following the end of the St. Martin's Press contest, the new adult category has become increasingly popular through self-publishing. Major New York publishers are taking self-published authors of these titles and acquiring them for mass market sales. Some authors include:

- Cora Carmack for Losing It
- Sylvia Day for Reflected in You
- Colleen Hoover for Slammed and Point of Retreat
- Jamie McGuire for Beautiful Disaster
- Tammara Webber for Easy

== Authors ==
Some noteworthy authors of the category include:

- Abbi Glines
- Casey McQuiston
- Gail O. Dellslee
- Gemma Burgess
- J.A. Redmerski
- Jessica Sorensen
- Katy Evans
- Sarah J. Maas
- Sylvain Reynard
