= Capital City Film Festival =

Annual film festival held in Lansing, Michigan

- Location: Lansing, Michigan, U.S.
- Founded: 2011
- Language: International
- Website: www.capitalcityfilmfest.com

The Capital City Film Festival (CCFF) is an annual film festival held in Lansing, Michigan. The festival is held every April using a variety of venues across the city as screening locations. Past venues have included: the Fledge, Sears Frandor, Hot Water Works, The Avenue, the Lansing Center, the Lansing Public Media Center, The Loft, Mac's, Robin Theatre, Harem, The Exchange, Lansing Community College, the Michigan Historical Museum, Impression 5 Science Center, Riverwalk Theater, R.E. Olds Transportation Museum, Central United Methodist Church and the Temple Building.

== Recognition ==
Named one of the 25 Coolest Film Festivals in the World by MovieMaker Magazine. Recipient of an Applause Award for Arts and Cultural Organization of the year from the Arts Council of Greater Lansing.

== History ==
The Capital City Film Festival was founded in 2011 in the hopes of screening and encouraging local shorts and feature-length movies being made in and about Michigan. The scope broadened immediately due to the response from filmmakers and the festival now programs a wide variety of documentaries, narratives, experimental, and short films. The goal of promoting and giving screening space to Michigan-based films has expanded to include films from across the nation and the world. The festival emphasizes movies, music and technology. A full lineup of movies is shown across the Greater Lansing Region, alongside national bands and parties in the evenings. The signature events have included the Red Carpet Opening Night Party, Fortnight Film Contest, Symphonic Cinema, TEDxLansing, The MSU Media Sandbox, and free screenings throughout. Cofounded by Nicole Szymczak, Dominic Cochran, Jason Gabriel, and Camron Gnass

== Fortnight Film Contest ==
In addition to the festival, the CCFF also hosts the Fortnight Film Contest. The Fortnight Film Contest is a two-week (one fortnight) film competition, where 20+ teams compete to create short films ranging from 31.4 seconds to 10 minutes, including credits. Teams are given three required elements to be included in their films, but unlike some film competitions, the required elements need not be the focus of the short. Their primary purpose is to ensure the film was made within the two-week period. Keeping with the festival's Michigan heritage, at least one of the major creative positions must be filled by a Michigan resident: Writer, Director, Cinematographer, or Editor. The short must also be shot and edited in Michigan.
