= Virginia Gardner =

American actress (born 1995)

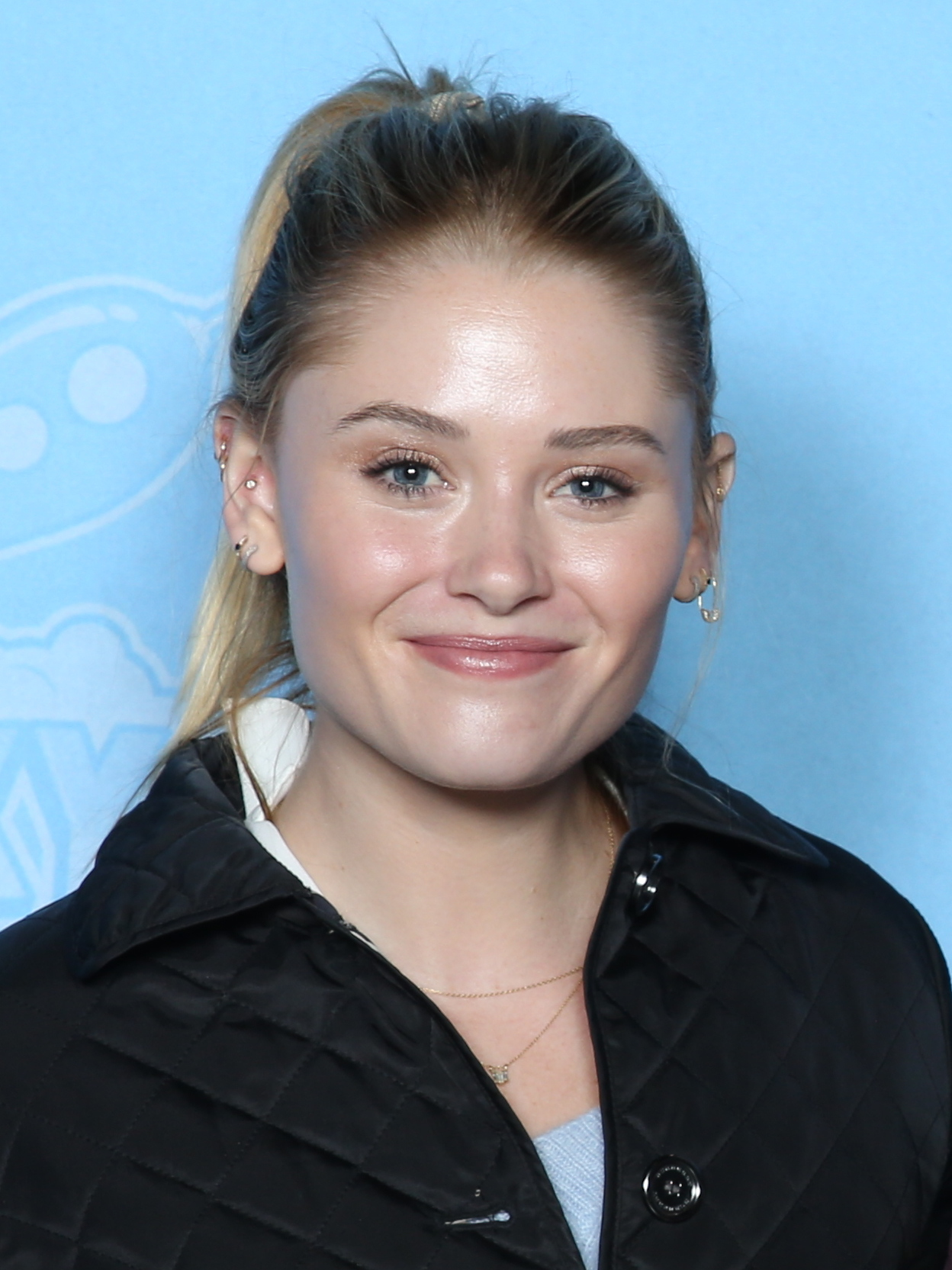
- Gardner at GalaxyCon Richmond in 2022
- Born: Virginia Elizabeth Gardner; April 18, 1995 (age 31); Sacramento, California, U.S.
- Occupations: Actress; model
- Years active: 2011–present
- Spouse: Jed Elliott (m. 2023)

Virginia Elizabeth Gardner (also known as Ginny Gardner; born April 18, 1995) is an American actress who played Karolina Dean in the Hulu original series Marvel's Runaways (2017–2019), Vicky in David Gordon Green's horror film Halloween (2018), and Shiloh Hunter in Lionsgate's survival film Fall (2022).

== Early life ==
Virginia Elizabeth Gardner was born on April 18, 1995 in Sacramento, California. She attended Sacramento Country Day School from kindergarten to eighth grade, taking part in many of her middle school's productions. In 2011, she took online schooling when she moved to Los Angeles, but then chose to take the California High School Proficiency Exam when she was allowed to, in October 2011. Her desire to act was due to the 2001 film I Am Sam, explaining "[I wanted to] make things that can affect people and that people can relate to." Her nonverbal autistic brother Chas inspired her as well.

Gardner initially lived with her mother to pursue acting full-time. Gardner lived with her mother for the first year; however, once she started to be more successful and able to handle herself, she moved into her own apartment and began to live on her own.

== Career ==
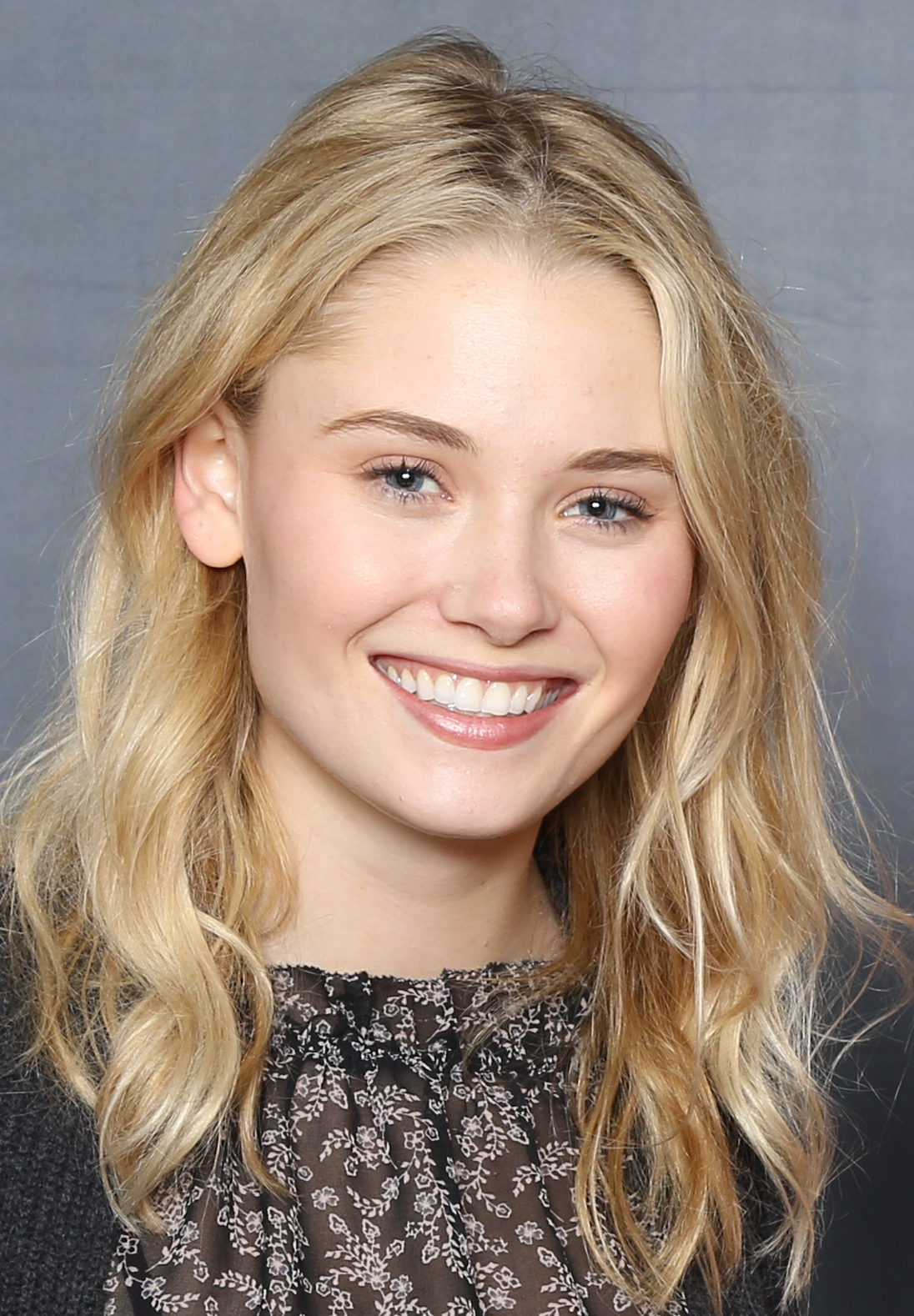
Gardner at Paradise City Comic Con in 2018

After appearing on the Disney Channel series Lab Rats, she took a year off from acting to work on modeling. When she became absorbed in modeling, she was going to stop acting, but then heard about the audition for Glee. She has modeled for Kohl's, Love Culture, HP, Hollister, LF, and Famous Footwear.

In 2015, Gardner starred in the found footage science fiction thriller film Project Almanac as Christina Raskin, the main character's younger sister. The movie helped Gardner to establish herself in Hollywood. In February 2017, it was announced that Gardner would star as Karolina Dean in Marvel's Runaways (2017), a Hulu original series. She received wide recognition for her portrayal of the LGBTQ hero. She starred as Vicky in the horror film Halloween (2018), a sequel to the 1978 film of the same name.

In 2022, she played Shiloh Hunter in Scott Mann thriller Fall alongside Grace Caroline Currey.

== Personal life ==
Gardner describes herself as a feminist. In August 2023, she married Jed Elliott, bassist of The Struts. She has a black belt in taekwondo, and also took up boxing and nunchucks.

== Filmography ==
=== Film ===
List of Virginia Gardner film credits
Year	Title	Role	Notes
2015	Project Almanac	Christina Raskin	
2016	Goat	Leah	
2016	Good Kids	Emily	
2016	Tell Me How I Die	Anna Nichols	
2018	Little Bitches	Kelly	
2018	Halloween	Vicky	
2018	Monster Party	Iris	
2018	Starfish	Aubrey	
2020	All the Bright Places	Amanda	
2022	Fall	Shiloh Hunter	
2023	Beautiful Disaster	Abby Abernathy	
2023	See You On Venus	Amelia "Mia"	Also executive producer
2024	Beautiful Wedding	Abby Abernathy	
2025	F*** Marry Kill	Kelly	
2025	A Breed Apart	Thalia Hearst	
2026	F Valentine's Day	Gina	
2026	Killer Whale	Maddie	
2026	Fall 2: Deadpoint	Shiloh Hunter	

=== Television ===
List of Virginia Gardner television credits
Year	Title	Role	Notes
2011	Hart of Dixie	Young Lemon	Episode: "Hairdos & Holidays"
2012	Lab Rats	Danielle	Episode: "Leo's Jam"
2013	Glee	"Katie Fitzgerald" / Marissa	Episodes: "Feud", "Shooting Star"
2013–2014	The Goldbergs	Lexy Bloom	Recurring, 8 episodes
2015	How to Get Away with Murder	Molly Barlett	Episode: "Skanks Get Shanked"
2016	Law & Order: Special Victims Unit	Sally Landry	Episode: "Fashionable Crimes"
2016	Major Crimes	Brie Miller	Episode: "Family Law"
2016	Secrets and Lies	Rachel	Episodes: "The Detective", "The Daughter"
2017	Zoo	Clem-2	Episodes: "No Place Like Home", "Diaspora"
2017	The Tap	Michelle Cuttriss	Episode: "Pilot"
2017–2019	Marvel's Runaways	Karolina Dean	Main role
2019	Dolly Parton's Heartstrings	Young Harper	Episode: "Sugar Hill"
2019	The Righteous Gemstones	Lucy	Episode: "Is This the Man Who Made the Earth Tremble"
2021	American Horror Stories	Bernadette	Episode: "BA'AL"
2022	Gaslit	Sharon	Episode: "Honeymoon"
2025	1923	Mabel	Season 2, episodes 6 and 7

== Awards and nominations ==
List of Virginia Gardner accolades
Year	Award	Category	Nominated work	Result	Ref.
2015	Hollywood Beauty Awards	New Beauty Award	Herself	Won	
2017	Golden Issue Awards	Best Ensemble Cast (shared with the Cast)	Marvel's Runaways	Won	
