= Kendall Ryan (novelist) =

American novelist (born 1981)

- Born: August 15, 1981 (age 45); South Carolina, U.S.
- Education: Western Michigan University
- Occupation: Author
- Writing career
- Language: English
- Genres: romance, new-adult

Kendall Ryan (born August 15, 1981) is a New York Times, Wall Street Journal and USA Today bestselling American novelist. She has written more than two dozen novels, including the self-published bestsellers Resisting Her, Hard to Love, The Impact of You, Hitched, Screwed, The Fix Up, Filthy Beautiful Lies and The Room Mate. Her books are described as "beautiful, electrifying love stories that can make even the most pessimistic person believe in happily ever afters." She writes romance, new adult and romantic comedies, and her books have sold more than 2 million copies worldwide. Her traditionally published books include the bestselling Love By Design series with Simon & Schuster.

== Biography ==
Ryan was born on August 15, 1981, in South Carolina. She has lived in South Carolina, Idaho, Guam, Michigan, California, Illinois, Minnesota and Texas. She graduated from Western Michigan University with a bachelor's degree in business, emphasis on Marketing.

Ryan signed with a literary agent in 2011 and was on submission to sell her first novel when she saw the rising success of indie authors on Amazon's new self-publishing platform, and decided to try self-publishing rather than accept a traditional publishing deal. In 2012 she left her job in corporate America to pursue writing full-time. Since that time, she has been featured on the New York Times and USA Today bestsellers lists more than three dozen times.

In 2015 Filthy Beautiful Lies was featured in Newsweek magazine as "The Next Fifty Shades". Ryan's new series, When I Break was featured in Cosmopolitan Magazine.

Ryan has a passion for humanitarian work, particularity with disadvantaged children, and orphans. Adoption is a theme often explored in her books. In 2017, she signed on for a publishing contract with the Waterhouse Press, as well as Radish Fiction. She lives in Texas with her husband and two sons.

== Selected works ==
Unravel Me

- Unravel Me (2012)
- Make Me Yours (2012)

A Love by Design

- Working It (2013)
- Craving Him (2014)
- All or Nothing (2014)

Filthy Beautiful Lies

- Filthy Beautiful Lies (2014)
- Filthy Beautiful Love (2014)
- Filthy Beautiful Lust (2014)
- Filthy Beautiful Forever (2015)

Hard to Love

- The Dare (formerly Hard to Love) (2013)
- The Temptation (formerly Reckless Love) (2015)

When I Break

- When I Break (2014)
- When I Surrender (2014)
- When We Fall (2014)

Lessons with the Dom

- The Gentleman Mentor (2015)
- Sinfully Mine (2015)

Alphas Undone

- Bait & Switch (2016)
- Slow & Steady (2016)

Imperfect Love

- Hitched: Volume One (2016)
- Hitched: Volume Two (2016)
- Hitched: Volume Three (2016)

Roommates

- The Room Mate (2017)
- The Play Mate (2017)
- The House Mate (2017)
- The Soul Mate (2017)

Forbidden Desires

- Dirty Little Secret (2017)
- Dirty Little Promise (2017)
- Torrid Little Affair (2017)
- Tempting Little Tease (2018)

Penthouse Affair

- The Two Week Arrangement (2019)
- Seven Nights of Sin (2019)

Escorts, Inc.

- Boyfriend for Hire (2019)
- The Hookup Handbook (2019)

Hot Jocks

- Playing for Keeps (2019)
- All the Way (2019)
- Trying to Score (2019)
- Crossing the Line (2020)
- Down and Dirty (2020)
- Wild for You (2020)
- Taking His Shot (2020)
- The Bedroom Experiment (2020)
- Breaking the Rules (2021)

Frisky Business

- The Boyfriend Effect (2020)
- My Brother's Roommate (2020)
- The Stud Next Door (2021)

Looking to Score

- The Rebel (2021)
- The Rival (2021)
- The Rookie (2021)
- The Rebound (2021)

Hart Brothers

- The Forever Formula (2023)
- The Marrying Kind (2023)
- The Boyfriend Bet (2023)
- Every Summer Since (2023)
- The Impact of You (2013)
- Resisting Her (2013)
- Monster Prick (2015)
- Screwed (2015)
- The Fix Up (2016)
- Wednesday (2016)
- The Bed Mate: A Room Mate Novella (2017)
- Sexy Stranger (2017)
- xo, Zach (2018)
- Baby Daddy (2018)
- Love Machine (2018)
- Dear Jane (2018)
- Bro Code (2018)
- Mister Tonight (2018)
- Flirting with Forever (2018)
- Misadventures with the Boss (2018)
- Hunky Heartbreaker: A Whiskey Kisses Novella (2018)
- Junk Mail (2019)
- Only for Tonight (2019)
- Bossy Brit (2019)
- Penthouse Prince (2020)
- How to Date a Younger Man (2020)
- Hot Blooded (2022)
- Tempted (2023) (co-written with Billie Bloom)

Ryan also writes under the pseudonym Poppy St. James

- Second Chance Summer (2021)
- Beauty and the Brit (formerly Bossy Brit under Kendall Ryan) (2021)
- Romancing His Rival (formerly Hitch Vol. 1-3 under Kendall Ryan) (2021)
