= Beautiful Disaster (novel) =

Novel by Jamie McGuire

- First edition
- Author: Jamie McGuire
- Language: English
- Genre: New adult, romance, Young Adult
- Publisher: Atria Books
- Publication place: United States
- Pages: 432

Beautiful Disaster is a new adult novel by American author Jamie McGuire. It appeared first on the New York Times Best Seller list as a self-published novel in 2012. Beautiful Disaster was originally self-published in May 2011, then acquired by Atria Books of Simon & Schuster and re-released in August 2012. It has been translated into over fifty languages worldwide.

== Characters ==
- Travis "Mad Dog" Maddox
- Abby "Pigeon" Abernathy
- America Mason
- Shepley Maddox
- Parker Hayes
- Kara Lin
- Megan
- Trenton Maddox
- Marek Young
- Finch
- Tyler Maddox
- Mick Abernathy
- Jim Maddox
- Taylor Maddox
- Thomas Maddox
- Adam
- Ethan
- Jason Brazil
- Chris Jenkins

== Film adaptation ==
In 2012, Warner Bros. Entertainment optioned the film rights for Beautiful Disaster, but the movie never went to production and the Warner Bros. option ended May 13, 2014. The book was then optioned for film by Voltage Pictures, production began in 2021 with Roger Kumble as director, and actors featured in the project include Dylan Sprouse, Rob Estes and Virginia Gardner. The project has received public criticism due to the author's controversial statements and far right political viewpoints. The film screened as part of Fathom Events on April 13, 2023. The film will stream on Hulu starting August 11, 2023.
