= Jamie McGuire (author) =

American author

- Born: November 6, 1978 (age 47); Tulsa, Oklahoma, U.S.
- Education: Northern Oklahoma College; University of Central Oklahoma; Autry Technology Center
- Occupation: Writer
- Notable work: Beautiful Disaster
- Children: 3

Jamie McGuire (born November 6, 1978) is an American romance novelist from Oklahoma. She writes primarily in the new adult fiction genre, and became popular with the release of her novel Beautiful Disaster. Several of her books have been self-published.

== Biography ==
Jamie McGuire was born in Tulsa, Oklahoma, and raised in Blackwell, Oklahoma. McGuire is a 1997 graduate of Blackwell High School. She received further education at Northern Oklahoma College, the University of Central Oklahoma, and Autry Technology Center. She holds an Associate Degree of Applied Science in radiography from Northern Oklahoma College.

Prior to becoming a full-time author she worked for many years as a radiographer. She previously lived in Enid, Oklahoma, and currently resides in Jenks, Oklahoma. McGuire has two daughters and a son. In 2019 she went viral for her opposition to vaccinations.

In 2020, she attempted a run as a Republican for the Oklahoma House of Representatives in house district 69, but was disqualified due to residency requirements.

== Self-publishing ==
McGuire self-published her first four novels, Providence, Requiem, Beautiful Disaster, and Eden. Due to the success of Beautiful Disaster as a New York Times best seller she was offered a publishing contract with Atria Books for the rights to Beautiful Disaster and its sequel, Walking Disaster. Atria Books also published Beautiful Oblivion, Red Hill, and A Beautiful Wedding. Many of her novels have ranked on the New York Times best seller list, including Walking Disaster which also ranked on the USA Today, and Wall Street Journal lists.

In 2014 McGuire returned to self-publishing for her next novel, Happenstance, because she realized she would make a higher profit by keeping her own digital rights. Since then, with the exception of From Here to You and All the Little Lights in 2018, most of her work has been self-published.

== Bibliography ==
=== Providence ===
1. Providence (2010, self-published; ISBN 9780615417172)
2. Requiem (2011, self-published; ISBN 9781475258950)
3. Eden (2012, self-published; ISBN 9781475145571)
- Sins of the Innocent: A Novella (2015, self-published; ISBN 9781514601471)
- Sins of the Immortal: A Novella (2021, self-published; ISBN 9798576130313)

=== Beautiful ===
1. Beautiful Disaster (2011, self-published / 2012, Atria Books; ISBN 9781476712048)
2. Walking Disaster (2013, Atria Books; ISBN 9781476712987)
3. Almost Beautiful (2022, self-published; ISBN 9780997242010)
- "Mrs. Maddox" (2012, self-published, short story)
- A Beautiful Wedding (2013, Atria Books; ISBN 9781501103070)
- Endlessly Beautiful (2016-2017, self-published, extended chapters)

=== Maddox Brothers ===
1. Beautiful Oblivion (2014, Atria Books; ISBN 9781476759586)
2. Beautiful Redemption (2015, self-published; ISBN 9781502541857)
3. Beautiful Sacrifice (2015, self-published; ISBN 9781511847506)
4. Beautiful Burn (2016, self-published; ISBN 9781512284133)
5. A Beautiful Funeral (2016, self-published; ISBN 9781534623576)
6. Beyond Oblivion (2025, self-published; ISBN 9798230119777)
- Something Beautiful: A Novella (2015, self-published; ISBN 9781512284041)

=== Red Hill ===
- Red Hill (2013, Atria Books; ISBN 9781476763514)
- Among Monsters: A Red Hill Novella (2014, self-published; ISBN 9781502937537)

=== Happenstance ===
1. Happenstance (2014, self-published; ISBN 9781505357608)
2. Happenstance 2 (2014, self-published; ISBN 9781500852047)
3. Happenstance 3 (2015, self-published; ISBN 9781505517767)

=== Crash and Burn ===
1. From Here To You (2018, Forever Romance; ISBN 9781538730010)
2. The Edge of Us (2019, self-published; ISBN 9781098574314)
3. The Art of Dying (2023, self-published; ISBN 9780997242058)

=== The Sovereign Saga ===
1. The Sovereign: Part One (2025, self-published; ISBN 9780997242041)

=== Stand alone work ===
- Apolonia (2014, self-published; ISBN 9781501022081)
- Sweet Nothing (2015, self-published, co-authored with Teresa Mummert; ISBN 9781799987031)
- All the Little Lights (2018, Montlake Romance; ISBN 9781503902787)
