= Sidelined 3: End Game =

Upcoming American romantic comedy film

- Promotional poster
- Directed by: Michael Medico
- Based on: The QB and Me by Tay Marley
- Produced by: McKenna Marshall; Lindsay Macadam; Adam Wescott; Maxwell Mitcheson; Madison Thompson; Jason Fischer; David Madden; Jason Goldberg
- Starring: Siena Agudong; Noah Beck; Charlie Gillespie
- Cinematography: Mark Chow
- Edited by: Jane MacRae
- Production companies: Marshall Arts; Blue Ant Studios; Wattpad Webtoon Studios
- Distributed by: Tubi
- Release date: November 26, 2026
- Running time: 94 minutes
- Country: United States
- Language: English

Sidelined 3: End Game is an upcoming American romantic comedy film. Directed by Michael Medico, the film is the sequel to Sidelined 2: Intercepted (2025) and the third and final installment in the Sidelined trilogy. Siena Agudong, Noah Beck and Charlie Gillespie reprise their roles.

== Plot ==
Set two years after Sidelined 2: Intercepted, USC quarterback Drayton Lahey travels to New York City as a Heisman Trophy hopeful. However, his real goal is to win back his former high school sweetheart, Dallas Bryan, who is busy building a new career and dating her new boyfriend, Skyler.

== Cast ==
- Siena Agudong as Dallas Bryan
- Noah Beck as Drayton Lahey
- Charlie Gillespie as Skyler
- Drew Ray Tanner as Nathan Bryan
- Kolton Stewart as Zach Morgan
- Sage Linder as Miley
- Asia Lizardo as Gabby
- Jason Fernandes as Josh Lahey
- Sarah Levy as Christina

== Production ==
On May 7, 2026 Tubi announced that a third film in the Sidelined franchise was in development. It will be the final installment, and Noah Beck, Siena Agudong and Charlie Gillespie will reprise their roles. Michael Medico directs the film, replacing Justin Wu, who directs the previous films. McKenna Marshall, Lindsay Macadam, Adam Wescott, Maxwell Mitcheson, Madison Thompson, Jason Fischer, David Madden and Jason Goldberg will produce it. On August 25, 2026, Sarah Levy joined the cast.

Principal photography began in Victoria on April 29, 2026 and concluded on May 21, 2026.

== Release ==
Sidelined 3: End Game will premiere on Tubi on November 26, 2026.
