= Jonaxx =

Filipino author

- Born: Jonah Panen Pacala
- Other names: Queen J, Queen Jonaxx
- Education: Xavier University – Ateneo de Cagayan
- Occupations: Author; Teacher
- Writing career
- Pen name: Jonaxx
- Language: English; Tagalog; Visayan
- Years active: 2012–present
- Website: www.wattpad.com/jonaxx jonaxxstories.com

Jonah Panen Pacala also known by her pseudonym as Jonaxx, is a Filipino author, who hails from Cagayan de Oro, Philippines. She is currently the most followed Wattpad author worldwide with over 10 million followers and is widely known as the "Wattpad Empress" and "Queen of Romance". Jonaxx is one of the all-time best-selling authors in the Philippines. In 2017, she has published around 500,000 copies of her books and was featured in Yes! magazine. Her best works include Pop Fiction's Mapapansin Kaya?, Every Beast Needs A Beauty, and the Baka Sakali Trilogy— some of which made it to National Book Store's local fiction bestseller list.

== Education ==
Jonaxx attended the Xavier University – Ateneo de Cagayan, where she graduated with a bachelor's degree in early childhood education in 2011.

== Career ==
Jonaxx joined the online teen forum TeenTalk on the website candymag.com (the online affiliate of Candy magazine, published by Summit Media), and she posted her work on "Creative Corner," a TeenTalk subsection dedicated to poems and stories way back 2003.

In November 2012, acting on an old tip from one of her readers, Jonaxx signed up on the online writing platform Wattpad to call out a user who had plagiarized one of her works. She then became the first Filipino writer to be verified by Wattpad and was followed by Allen Lau on the platform.

In March 2017, she ended her Pop Fiction run with the release of an entire trilogy, the Baka Sakali Trilogy, which was launched in one of the biggest book signing events by a single author by a local publisher. Summit Books held the book signing in Filoil Flying V Arena.

In December 2018, the Alegria Boys Boxed Set was launched under Jonaxx's own imprint Majesty Press. It was held in the Filoil Flying V Arena. Two years after the launch, MPress' Alegria Boys Boxed Set remains as one of the bestselling books.

In November 2019, Cristina Pantoja-Hidalgo acknowledged the natural talent of writers like Jonaxx in her speech at the 69th Carlos Palanca Memorial Awards for Literature, saying that the author is "so big that the company has created an imprint just for her".

In September 2020, Jonaxx was included in a module as one of the Tanyag na Manunulat in the Philippines together with the national hero José Rizal.

In March 2021, the acclaimed poet-writer Jerry Gracio, named Jonaxx as one of the most influential writers over the past 10 years in the Philippines together with Bob Ong, Conchitina Cruz, and Allan Popa.

On April 24, 2022, Jonaxx was awarded the Silver Play Button for surpassing 100,000 subscribers on YouTube. As of July 2023, her TikTok hashtag – #jonaxx has exceeded over 1 billion combined views, despite not having an official account on the platform.

Jonaxx has written over 40 books and 17 books were published in the mainstream. Her works are written in Taglish and have inspired fierce loyalty and great dedication among fans, who are one of the most active in the local romance novel scene. Due to her immense popularity, her stories have also been published and sold at bookstores. Since their publication, her books have consistently ranked among the Top 10 bestselling local novels at the National Book Store. On Summit Books' Pop Fiction, Sizzle, and Majesty Press, she has published stories from the Elizalde Brothers Series (Heartless and Worthless), the Good Lips Series (Every Beast Needs A Beauty), the Art of Seduction Series (Training To Love and Why Do You Hate Me?), the Jimenez Cousin Series (Chase and Hearts), the Alegria Boys Series (Mapapansin Kaya?, Baka Sakali, End This War, and Tale From Alegria), and the Azucarera de Altagracia Series (Against The Heart, Getting To You, Hold Me Close, and Never Get Past Him).

She has also self-published her stories from the Montefalco Series (Until Trilogy – Until He Was Gone, Until He Returned, Until Forever), the Good Lips Series (One Night, One Lie and Give In To You), 24 Signs of Summer, and the Costa Leona Series (Scorching Love, Waves of Memories, Island of Fire, Blown by the Wind, What Lies Beneath the Sand, Sands of Time, Ruling the Wild Waves, and Sunburned Heart).

Other very popular series and stories by Jonaxx are the Azucarera Series, Del Fierro Series, Alegria Girls Series, Nuevo Series, After The Last Series, City of Embers Series, Rara Avis Series, Viejo Series, and many more to come which can be read in her own app.

== Bibliography ==
=== After the Last Series ===
1. Made of Ruins
2. Made of Glass
3. Made of Scars
4. Made of Ashes

=== Alegria Boys Series ===
1. Baka Sakali Trilogy
  – Baka Sakali 1
  – Baka Sakali 2
  – Baka Sakali 3
2. Mapapansin Kaya?
3. End This War

=== Alegria Girls Series ===
1. Whipped: Entice
2. Ripped: Freya
3. Tripped: Lilienne

=== Art of Seduction Series ===
1. Training To Love
2. Why Do You Hate Me?

=== Azucarera de Altagracia Series ===
1. Against the Heart
2. Getting To You
3. Hold Me Close
4. Never Get Past Him (Exclusive Novella)

=== City of Embers Series ===
1. Nightfall Promised

=== Costa Leona Series ===
1. Scorching Love
2. Waves of Memories
3. Island of Fire
4. Blown by the Wind
5. What Lies Beneath the Sand
6. Sands of Time
7. Ruling the Wild Waves
8. Sunburned Heart
9. Whispers of the Wind
10. Love in the Dark
11. Kissing the Dust
12. Sweet Flames of Vengeance
13. After the Chains
14. The Sun's Heartbeat
15. A Kiss to Costa Leona (Anthology)

=== Del Fierro Series ===
1. One Rebellious Night
2. The Beast in Paradise
3. Giving You Wildfire

=== Elizalde Brothers Series ===
1. Heartless
2. Worthless

=== Good Lips Series ===
1. Every Beast Needs A Beauty
2. One Night, One Lie
3. Give In To You

=== HBS ===
1. Suntok sa Buwan

=== Jimenez Cousins Series ===
1. Invisible Man
2. No Perfect Prince
3. Chase and Hearts

=== Montefalco Series ===
1. Until Trilogy
  – Until He Was Gone
  – Until He Returned
  – Until Forever
2. To Stay
3. To Fall Again
4. To Be With You
5. To Get Over You
6. From Afar

=== Nuevo Series ===
1. From the Start
2. It Was You
3. Til the Very End

=== One Shot and Short Novels ===
1. Nung Na-realize Mo Na
2. The Unloved Goddess
3. Glitch

=== Rainy Nights Series ===
1. No.1 Girl
2. Boy Next Door

=== Rara Avis Series ===
1. Shelter in Your Fingertips
2. A Call to Your Arms
3. Rushing Through My Veins
4. Never Just Skin Deep

=== Stand Alone Stories ===
1. Downfall Chronicles
2. Just That
3. 24 Signs of Summer
4. Remembering Summer

=== Viejo Series ===
1. Light A Candle
2. In Front of the Mirror
3. At Midnight

== Majesty Press ==
In July 2017, Jonaxx launched her own imprint, Majesty Press (MPress) under Summit Media. Majesty Press is a publisher of Jonaxx stories. It publishes the unabridged, uncut versions of her stories— some of which contain new and special content written exclusively for the MPress books imprint. In April 2020, Majesty Press released eBooks for the published books under MPress on Shopify. In April 2022, all of the books published under MPress were made available on Google Play Books.

== Jonaxx Stories app ==
On July 26, 2020, Jonaxx launched her own free online reading application, Jonaxx Stories, on IOS, and on August 7, 2020, it was released on Android. On February 23, 2021, Jonaxx Stories surpassed one million downloads on Google Play Store. On April 15, 2022, Jonaxx Stories ranked no. 2 in the Top Free Books iPhone Apps in App Store in the Philippines, behind Wattpad.

== Awards and Recognitions ==
- Most Followed Wattpad Author Worldwide
- The Best-Selling Author
- The Most Influential Writer/Author
- One Of The Asian Popular Writers
- Tanyag Na Manunulat
- Jaw Dropping Plot Twist Author
- Pop Fiction Queen
- Writer of the Year (2013)
- Most Active Writer Of the Year (2013)
- Best Romance Story (2013) – Chase and Hearts
- Best Teen Fiction Story – Invisible Man
- Best Story of the Year (2013) – Baka Sakali
- Best Romance Story (2013) – Baka Sakali
- Best Non Teen Fiction Story (2013) – Baka Sakali
- Summit Media Queen (2014)
- Gawad Kasulatan Awardee (2014)
- Filipino Readers Choice Award for Romance in Filipino (2015) – Heartless
- Best General Fiction Story – Heartless
- MyWattysChoice (2015) – To Stay
- People's Choice Award (2015) – Until Trilogy
- Best Romance Story – Until Trilogy
- Watty's People Choice Award – Tripped
- Best Writer in Watty's Best of the Best Awards (2017)
- Best International Story by The Fiction Awards (2019) – Until He Was Gone
