= Chat fiction =

Fiction written in text-message or instant messaging

Chat fiction is a format of web fiction written solely in the form of text-message or instant messaging conversations. Works are read primarily through dedicated mobile phone applications, the earliest being Hooked, which launched in 2015. The format became popular among teenagers and young adults, and other competing platforms followed, including Yarn and Tap, among others.

== History ==
The first chat fiction platform, Hooked, was created by Prerna Gupta and Parag Chordia, who were writing a novel and decided to do A/B testing to gauge reader preferences. They found that most of their target audience of teenagers failed to finish 1,000-word excerpts of best-selling young-adult novels, but read through stories of the same length written as text message conversations. They accordingly developed and launched Hook in 2015. The app gained popularity from late 2016, and reached the Apple App Store's top position among free apps in 2017. Competing apps began launching the same year, including Yarn, which also has a focus on interactive fiction, and Tap, developed by the online publishing platform Wattpad.

== Format ==
Chat fiction stories are presented as digital text conversations between two or more characters, without any narration. The format limits possible storytelling options, and presents a challenge to authors in conveying narrative only through dialogue. Most popular stories are of the horror and thriller genres. The format has been popular among teenagers and young adults, though it has been criticized as not providing a meaningful reading experience.

Applications usually present the story incrementally, with the user tapping to advance the story message by message. Some platforms feature content by paid writers, while others allow or rely on user contributions. Revenue is usually based on a freemium model, with basic access being free while subscribing offers removal of limits and other benefits.
