= Noah Beck =

American influencer (born 2001)

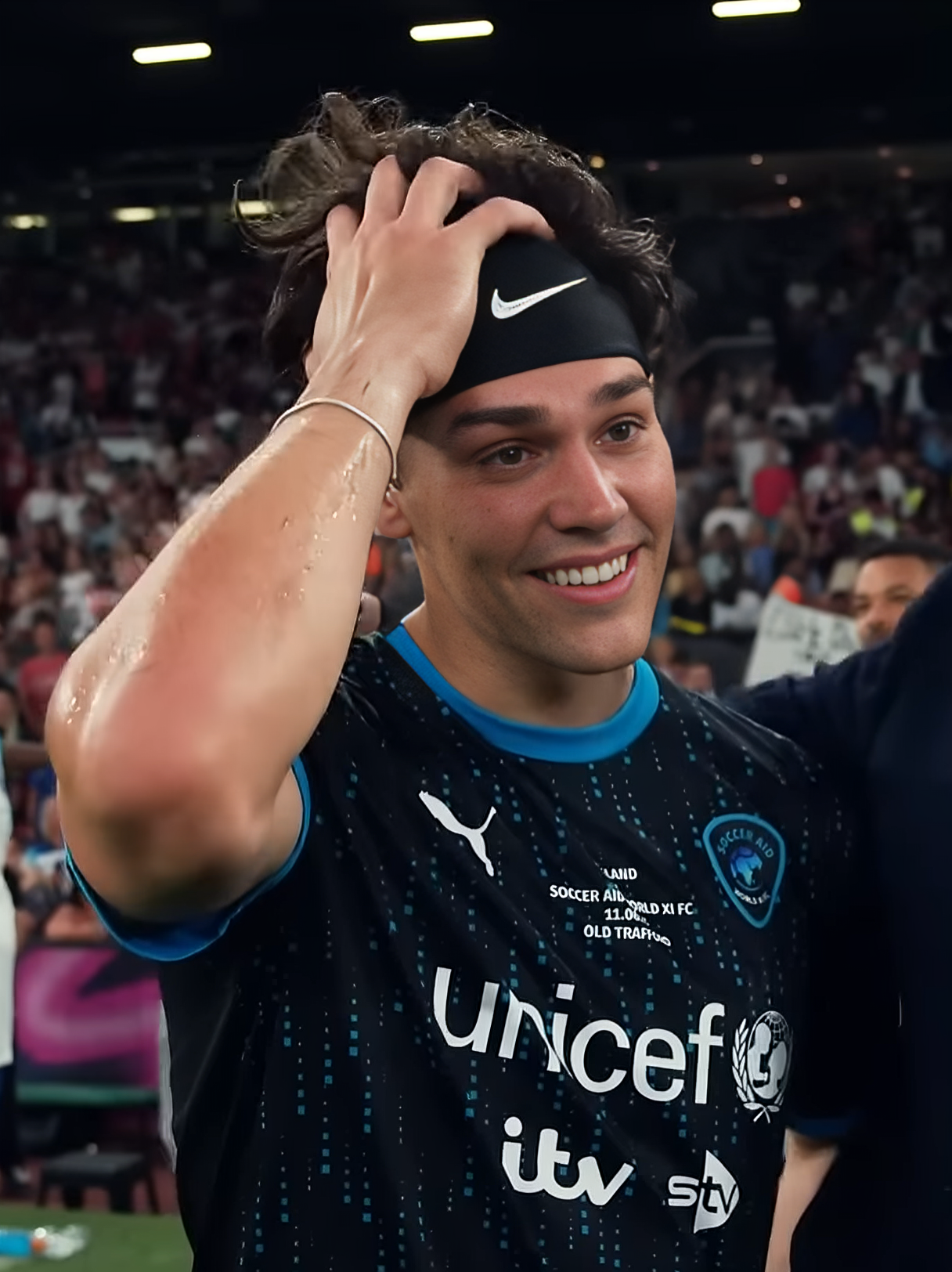
- Beck in 2023
- Born: May 4, 2001 (age 25); Peoria, Arizona, U.S.
- Education: University of Portland
- Occupations: Media personality; actor; footballer
- Years active: 2020–present

TikTok information
- Page: noahbeck
- Followers: 33.0 million

YouTube information
- Channel: Noah Beck
- Subscribers: 1.48 million
- Views: 96.6 million
Association football career
- Position: Midfielder
Youth career
- –2017: SC del Sol
- 2018–2019: Real Salt Lake
College career
Years	Team	Apps	(Gls)
2019	Portland Pilots	17	(0)
- Last updated: May 11, 2026

Noah Beck (born May 4, 2001) is an American media personality and actor, widely known for his content on TikTok. In 2019, Beck was a midfielder for the Portland Pilots men's soccer team. Beck's content includes dances and skits to audio clips of songs, movies, and TV shows. Beck has 33.5 million followers on TikTok, 7.8 million on Instagram, and over 1.51 million YouTube subscribers. TikTok listed Beck as one of the Top 10 breakout content creators of 2020. In 2023, he created the underwear brand IPHIS.

== Early life ==
Beck was born on May 4, 2001, and is from Peoria, Arizona. He attended Ironwood High School and Desert Valley Elementary School. Beck played for the SC del Sol club football team in Phoenix. In Arizona, he was a team captain in the U.S. Youth Football Olympic Development Program from 2014 to 2017. He moved to Utah during his last two years of high school, where he played for the Real Salt Lake Academy. Starting in 2019, Beck attended the University of Portland, where he was a midfielder on the Portland Pilots men's soccer team. Due to the COVID-19 pandemic in Portland, Oregon, Beck completed his second semester of his freshman year online before dropping out.

== Career ==
During the onset COVID-19 pandemic, Beck began using TikTok just before quarantine and his videos began to go viral within a month. In June 2020, he joined Sway House after being contacted by a member, Blake Gray. There, Beck duets and collaborates with other social media personalities. In November 2020, Beck was criticized by fans for charging fees for duets, although he later clarified that the fees were for brand deals. In 2021, Beck was enrolled in acting classes.

He is the subject of an AwesomenessTV short-form series titled Noah Beck Tries Things. The six-episode series premiered on January 22, 2021. The show includes his girlfriend and several of his friends. In March 2021, Beck was on a digital cover of VMan. His wardrobe, including fishnet tights, cuffed jeans, and stiletto heels, led to comparisons with David Bowie, Prince, Troye Sivan, and Harry Styles.

In 2021, Beck was a VIP guest for the Louis Vuitton menswear show. Beck also starred in Machine Gun Kelly's 2021 music video for his song Love Race. On September 24, 2022, Beck participated in a Sidemen Charity Match at The Valley that raised over £1m split across various charities. Beck finished with two assists in 83 minutes. Beck made his feature film acting debut in the romantic comedy Sidelined: The QB and Me. It was produced by Beck and is based on a popular Wattpad story by Tay Marley. It released on Tubi in 2024. In 2025, he reprised his role in its sequel Sidelined 2: Intercepted. In 2023, he was listed among Forbes 30 Under 30 Social Media list.

== Personal life ==
Beck was in a relationship with Dixie D'Amelio that started in September 2020. In December 2020, Beck and D'Amelio were criticized by fans for vacationing in Nassau, Bahamas, during the COVID-19 pandemic. He responded that he needed a chance to 'disconnect'. Beck elaborated that they were careful, traveled by private jet and stayed in a mostly empty hotel. D'Amelio and Beck broke up in late 2022.

Beck is a fan of Manchester United, and his football idol is Cristiano Ronaldo.

In April 2026, Beck's older sister Haley Beck was fired from her high school teaching position after she and another teacher were accused of grooming and sexually abusing a minor. Ongoing police investigation coupled with Beck's popularity increased public scrutiny of the family, resulting in his mother, Amy Beck, also being placed on leave from her teaching position after a sexually suggestive video she created with Beck resurfaced.

== Filmography ==
=== Film ===
Year	Title	Role	Note
2024	Sidelined: The QB and Me	Drayton Lahey	Tubi Original Movie
2025	Sidelined 2: Intercepted	Drayton Lahey	Tubi Original Movie
2026	Baton		Post-production
2026	Sidelined 3: End Game	Drayton Lahey	

=== Television ===
Year	Title	Role	Note
2021	Side Hustle	Perry	Episode: "The Way You Luke Tonight"
2023	Doogie Kameāloha, M.D.	Matty Bud	Episode: "Now What?"
2025	Doctor Odyssey	Steve	Episode: "Spring Break"
2027	Baywatch	Luke	Filming

=== Music video ===
Year	Title	Artist(s)
2020	"Canceled"	Larray
2021	"Love Race"	Machin Gun Kelly, Kellin Quinn

== Awards and nominations ==
Award	Year	Nominee(s)	Category	Result	Ref.
MTV Millennial Awards	2021	Himself	Global Creator	Nominated	
GQ Australia Men of the Year Awards	2023	Himself	International Sensation	Won	

=== Listicles ===
Publisher	Year	Listicle	Result	Ref.
Forbes	2023	30 Under 30: Social Media	Placed	

== See also ==
- List of most-followed TikTok accounts
