= Hooked (app) =

Chat fiction mobile application

- Developer: Telepathic Inc.
- Initial release: 2015; 11 years ago
- Operating system: iOS, Android
- Type: Chat fiction
- License: Freemium
- Website: hooked.co

Hooked is a mobile application where users can write or read chat fiction, short pieces of fiction told in the format of text messages between fictional characters. The app was released in September 2015 and was developed by Telepathic Inc.

== Features ==
Hooked is a freemium smartphone app that allows users to write or read short stories made up of text messages between characters. CEO Prerna Gupta described the app as "books for the Snapchat generation" or "Twitter for fiction." As of March 2019, the app had more than 40 million active users.

The stories are written by a mix of professional authors and crowd-sourced participants. The most popular genres are suspense and horror. The stories usually lack literary elements like character arcs, are simply written and are intended to be suspenseful or addicting. Each piece of fiction on the app is approximately 1,000 to 1,300 words long and can be read in about five minutes. Some longer stories are told in "chapters" and a 32,000-word thriller called Dark Matter was released in 2018.

The app provides a certain number of text messages for free, then delays the next text message by 15 minutes unless the user pays for a subscription. Prior to 2020, the app offered a three-day free trial and then required users to pay. According to Gupta, the app was intended to get the younger generation to read more without getting distracted. Most users of the app are between 13 and 24 years-old.

== History ==
The Hooked app was first released in September 2015. Initially, Hooked featured about 200 stories that were written by professional authors selected by the app developers. The following year, Telepathic Inc. released Hooked 2.0, which allowed users of the app to create and share their own short stories. By mid-2016, the app had 700 stories written by professional authors and 9,000 stories written by users.

Hooked had 1.8 million downloads by 2016 and 20 million download as of 2017, which generated $6.5 million in revenue. The response to Hooked prompted others to create similar text-message based short story apps, like Yarn and Tap.

Sensor Tower reported that the Hooked app received 2.22 million downloads during the period from October 2016 to March 2017.

Starting in 2020, longer stories divided into chapters debuted on the app. In March, the company launched Hooked TV, an app to showcase video pilots based on a number of scripts themed around the app's content. Out of 50 pilots, those that were most popular among users of the app and social media were expanded into original series as Hooked TV evolved into a streaming platform in the second half of 2021.

== Background ==
The idea for Hooked was conceived when Gupta was working on writing a book of her own. Prerna Gupta and her husband Parag Chordia tested short stories with 15,000 people and found that readers were five times more likely to read a story to its end if the story was presented in a text message format. They created Telepathic Inc., which developed Hooked.

According to Celebrity Secret when they first started out, the stories were basically as if two people were texting each other and some sort of drama unfolds. Some of their most popular initial stories were actually horror stories, where a mom gets a text from her daughter and something creepy is happening to her. Over time, they started to turn those into podcasts, which then led to making their own movies and TV shows.

As of 2017, the Telepathic has raised $6 million in funding to develop and support the Hooked app. From the main website itself the Hooked investors include Sound Ventures, The Chernin Group, WME/Endeavor, MACRO, Greg Silverman, Steph Curry, Kevin Durant, LeBron James, Mariah Carey, Jamie Foxx, Joe Montana, Aasif Mandvi, Max Martin, Anjula Acharia, Savan Kotecha, Cyan Banister, Eric Ries, A Capital, SV Angel, Cowboy Ventures, Founders Fund and Greylock, among many others.
