= Joshua Sweeney =

American Para ice hockey player and cross-country skier (born 1987)

Josh Sweeney
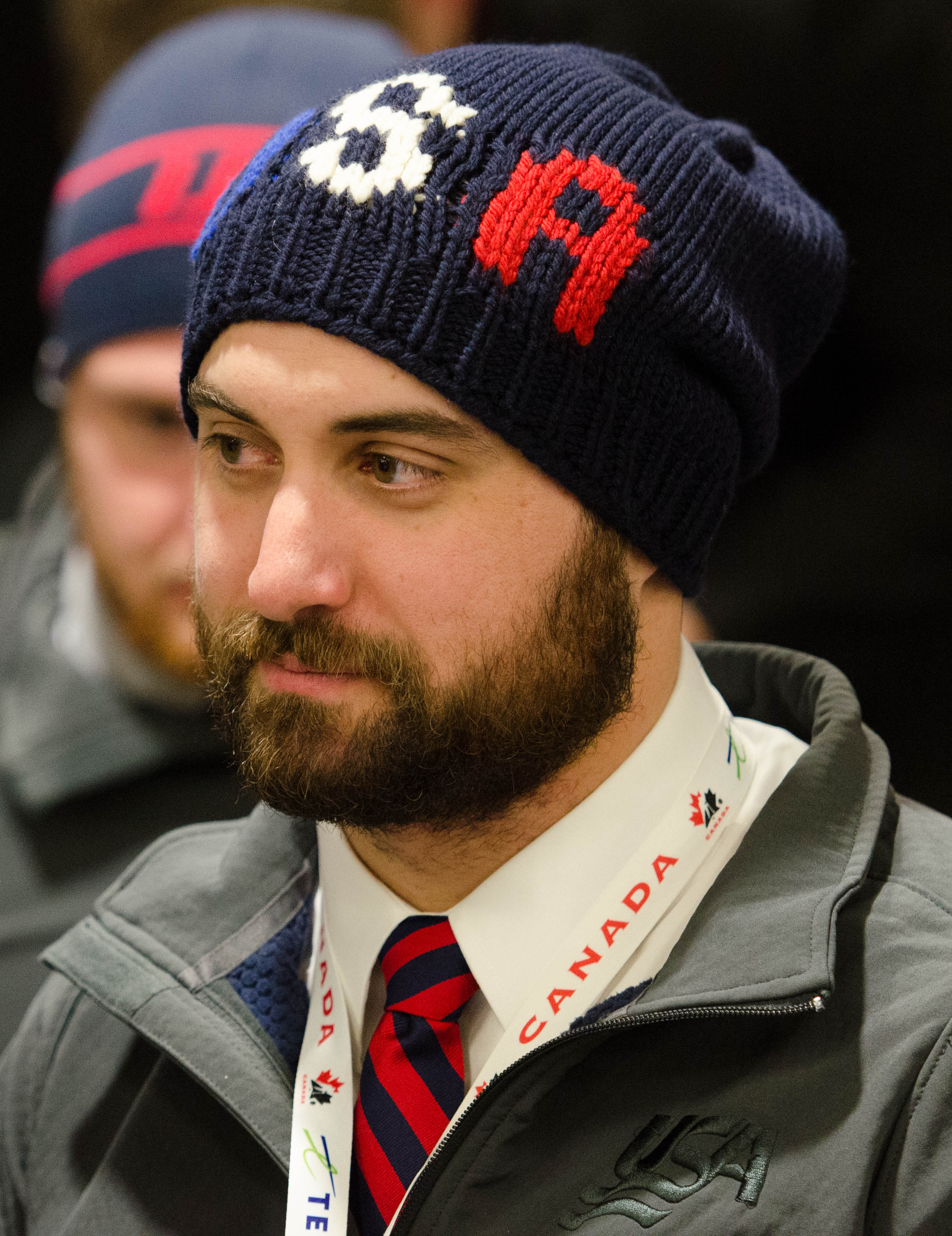
- Sweeney in 2015

Personal information
- Full name: Joshua Sweeney
- Born: June 6, 1987 (age 39) Williams AFB, Arizona, U.S.
- Education: Ironwood High School
- Height: 5 ft 8 in (173 cm)
- Military career
- Allegiance: United States of America
- Branch: United States Marine Corps
- Service years: 2005–2010
- Rank: Sergeant
- Unit: 3rd Battalion, 4th Marines
- Conflicts: Global War on Terrorism: Iraq War; Operation Enduring Freedom; War in Afghanistan
- Awards: Purple Heart

Sport
- Country: United States
- Sport: Para ice hockey; Para cross-country skiing
- Disability class: LW12 (skiing)
Medal record
Representing United States
Para ice hockey
Paralympic Games
Gold medal – first place	2014 Sochi	Team competition
World Championships
Gold medal – first place	2012 Hamar	Team competition
Gold medal – first place	2015 Buffalo	Team competition
Silver medal – second place	2013 Goyang	Team competition
Men's Para cross-country skiing
Paralympic Games
Gold medal – first place	2026 Milano Cortina	4 × 2.5 km mixed relay

Joshua Sweeney (born June 6, 1987) is an American gold medal Para ice hockey player, cross-country skier, and Purple Heart recipient. He competed at the 2014, 2022, and 2026 Winter Paralympics. A native of Arizona, he lived in Nampa, Idaho, as of 2014.

== Early life ==
Sweeney's passion for hockey began at an early age, as he played ice hockey during middle school & competed in his high school team. A graduate of Ironwood High School's class of 2005, he shortly enlisted in the United States Marine Corps.

== Military life ==
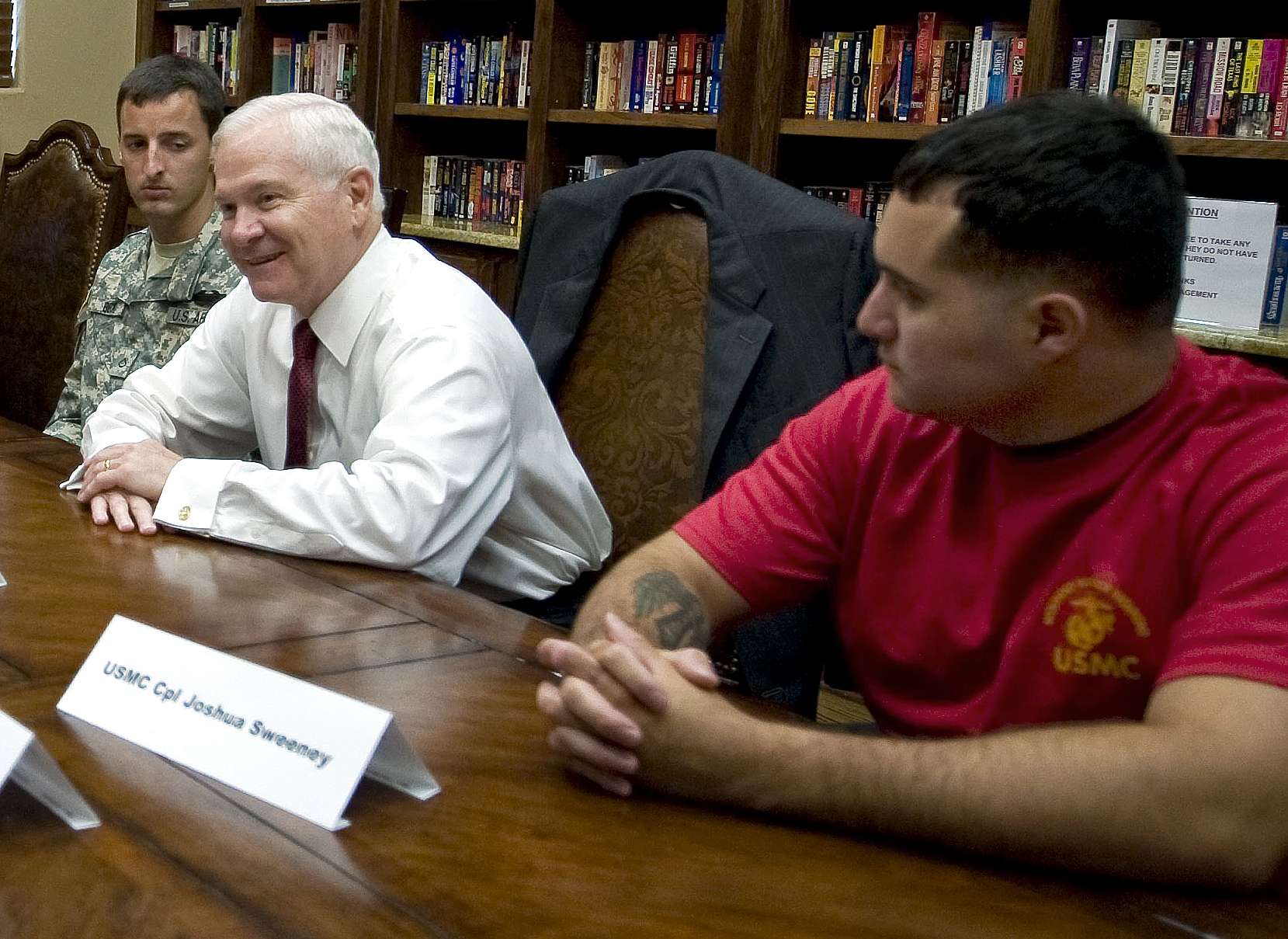
Sweeney (right) speaks with Secretary of Defense Robert Gates at a 2010 meeting with wounded warriors

In September 2009, Sergeant Sweeney was deployed to Afghanistan for his second deployment as a scout sniper to Nowzad, Afghanistan.

On October 28, 2009, while on patrol duty, Sgt. Sweeney was injured when he stepped on an IED. The blast severed both his legs & caused injury to his left hand & arm. He had to wait two hours to be evacuated.

== Paralympic career ==
In 2014, Sweeney joined Paralympic sled hockey team in Sochi and lost 2–1 to the Russians. Couple of days later, he scored the only goal with which his team won a gold medal in a final against the same country.

In 2022, Sweeney competed in Beijing in Para cross-country skiing making him a two-time Paralympian. He competed again in 2026 in Milano Cortina, where he earned a gold medal in the mixed 4 × 2.5 kilometre relay event with Oksana Masters, Sydney Peterson, and Jake Adicoff.
