= Eric Hagg =

American football player (born 1989)

No. 37, 27
- Position: Safety

Personal information
- Born: September 15, 1989 (age 37); Peoria, Arizona, U.S.
- Listed height: 6 ft 1 in (1.85 m)
- Listed weight: 205 lb (93 kg)

Career information
- High school: Glendale (AZ) Ironwood
- College: Nebraska
- NFL draft: 2011: 7th round, 248th overall pick

Career history
- Cleveland Browns (2011–2012); Denver Broncos (2014)*
- * Offseason or practice squad member only

Awards and highlights
- Third-team All-American (2010); First-team All-Big 12 (2010)

Career NFL statistics
- Total tackles: 33
- Fumble recoveries: 1
- Stats at Pro Football Reference

Eric Hagg (born September 15, 1989) is an American former professional football player who was a safety in the National Football League (NFL). He was selected by the Cleveland Browns in the seventh round of the 2011 NFL draft. He played college football for the Nebraska Cornhuskers.

== Early life ==
Hagg played high school football in Arizona at Ironwood High School.

== Professional career ==
Pre-draft measurables
Height	Weight	Arm length	Hand span	Wingspan	40-yard dash	10-yard split	20-yard split	20-yard shuttle	Three-cone drill	Vertical jump	Broad jump	Bench press
6 ft 1 3/8 in (1.86 m)	209 lb (95 kg)	32 7/8 in (0.84 m)	10 1/8 in (0.26 m)	6 ft 5 3/8 in (1.97 m)	4.56 s	1.55 s	2.62 s	4.19 s	6.73 s	38.5 in (0.98 m)	10 ft 1 in (3.07 m)	18 reps
All values from NFL Combine/Pro Day

=== Cleveland Browns ===
Hagg was selected by the Cleveland Browns in the 2011 NFL draft with their 7th round pick. He was released on May 21, 2013.

Hagg played in 10 games for the Cleveland Browns as a rookie after being injured in training camp. He finished his rookie season with 11 tackles and 1 pass deflection.

=== Denver Broncos ===
Hagg signed a future contract with the Denver Broncos in January 2014. On July 21, 2014, he retired from football.
