= Roan Curtis =

Canadian actress (born 1997)

- Born: February 1, 1997 (age 29); Vancouver, British Columbia, Canada
- Occupation: Actress
- Years active: 2007–present

Roan Curtis (born February 1, 1997) is a Canadian actress. She is best known for playing Young Kate in the drama series Firefly Lane and Marian Sykes in the teen drama film Before I Fall.

== Early life ==
Curtis is from Vancouver, British Columbia to entrepeneur Kildare Curtis and Stephanie Butler. At the age of 8 she began acting and convinced her parents to sign her with one of Canada's top talent agencies. She was involved with the theater in her high school. In the 8th grade she played Juliet in Romeo and Juliet, her first Shakespearan play.

== Career ==
Early on in her career she made appearances in the action series Supernatural portraying a demon and in the superhero series Smallville portraying a young version of Lily Sullivan played by Allison Mack. Curtis first recurring role came playing Emma Gilbert in the drama series Shut Eye. Her first big role came playing Sylvia in the crime series The Magicians. She played Marian Sykes, one of the lead characters in the teen drama film Before I Fall. Her biggest role so far has been playing Young Kate in the drama series Firefly Lane starring Katherine Heigl and Sarah Chalke. As of 2026 she is currently playing Olivia Quinn in the drama series Hope Valley 1874 starring Bethany Joy Lenz.

== Filmography ==
=== Film ===
Year	Title	Role	Notes
2012	Diary of a Wimpy Kid: Dog Days	Girl at Cranium Shaker#1	
2017	Before I Fall	Marion Sykes	
2017	1922	Victoria	
2018	Girl on a Bus	Mary Holmberg	Short
2018	In God I Trust	Samantha	
2019	Daughter	Mel	
2021	To Die For	Kristina Beard	
2023	The More Love Grows	Aly	
2025	Sidelined 2: Intercepted	Charlotte Carlisle	

=== Television ===
Year	Title	Role	Notes
2007	The L Word	Kid	Episode; Lexington and Concord
2007	Smallville	Young Chloe Sullivan	Episode; Progeny
2007	Bionic Woman	Little Girl	Episode; Pilot
2008	Supernatural	Bela's Demon	Episode; Time is on My Side
2016	Shut Eye	Emma Gilbert	5 episodes
2017-2018	The Magicians	Sylvia	4 episodes
2021	Charmed	Kyra	Episode; O' The Tangled Web
2021	The Good Doctor	Tory Starzak	Episode; Gender Reveal
2021-2023	Firefly Lane	Young Kate	26 episodes
2025	Alert: Missing Persons Unit	Bella	Episode; Bella, Genevieve, Amelia, Tally & Kate
2025	Murder in a Small Town	Marita Solway	Episode; Acts of Murder
2026	Hope Valley: 1874	Olivia Quinn	8 episodes
2026	Every Year After	Taylor	3 episodes
