= Figure 1 =

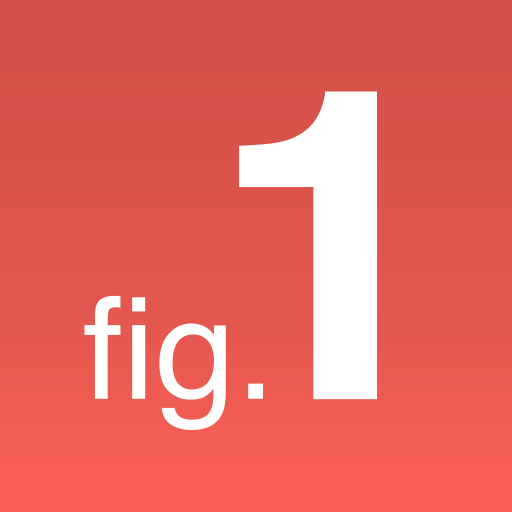
Logo

Figure 1 is a Toronto, Ontario-based online social networking service for healthcare professionals to post and comment on medical images.

Figure 1 was founded in Toronto by Dr. Joshua Landy, Richard Penner and Gregory Levey. The platform launched in North America in May 2013 and is now available in more than 100 countries.

The privately held company reports more than 1 million healthcare professionals use its app and website.

== Funding ==
In 2013, Figure 1 launched with $2 million (CDN) in seed money, with Rho Canada Ventures and Version One Ventures led the investment.

In 2015, the company added $5 million (USD) to its Series A financing round, which was led by Union Square Ventures, an early investor in Twitter, Tumblr, Etsy, and Kickstarter.

This brings the total round to $9 million (USD).

== Reception ==
Figure 1's content has been characterized as "gruesome".

The app's founder said the "very colorful images" are what medics see every day. "It's a transparent view into a world you rarely get to see," he told the BBC.

When the company launched in Europe in 2014, privacy concerns were raised over the sharing of personal medical information. The app has a built-in consent form which every patient signs via a smartphone, as well as tools make it easy to anonymize an image.

Before the company launched in 2013, it claimed that 13 percent of medical professionals were already using their smartphones to share images with one another via email or text message.

Figure 1 documented the spread of MERS (Middle East respiratory syndrome) in May, 2014.

During the Russian invasion of Ukraine, Figure 1 created a special feed to help medical professionals in Ukraine with its archives of cases on gunshot wounds and broken limbs.

== See also ==
- Medical image sharing
