= Wattpad Presents =

2014 Philippines television serialized drama

- Also known as: Wattpad Presents: TV Movie
- Genre: Drama
- Created by: TV5 Network, Inc.
- Country of origin: Philippines
- Original language: Filipino
- No. of seasons: 7

Production
- Camera setup: Multiple-camera setup
- Running time: 30 minutes
- Production companies: TV5 Network, Inc. Wattpad Studios

Original release
- Network: TV5
- Release: September 22, 2014 – July 29, 2017

Wattpad Presents is a 2014 Philippine drama television series produced by TV5 in partnership with Wattpad Studios and Life is Beautiful Publishing Company. It features stories from Wattpad as a primetime mini series on TV5.

== Premise ==
A series of Wattpad stories turned into TV dramas. Wattpad stories aired on the show are usually those that were published by LIB Publishing.

== Release ==
Wattpad Presents premiered on TV5 on September 22, 2014 as the network's primetime line-up.

== Episodes ==
Season	Episodes	Originally released		Format
Season	Episodes	First released	Last released	Format
1	60	September 22, 2014	December 19, 2014	serialized
2	65	January 19, 2015	April 24, 2015	serialized
3	45	April 27, 2015	July 3, 2015	serialized
4	40	July 20, 2015	October 2, 2015	serialized
5	50	October 26, 2015	January 8, 2016	serialized
6	19	February 6, 2016	June 18, 2016	TV movies
7	11	April 29, 2017	July 29, 2017	TV movies
