= Gregory Levey =

Canadian writer and entrepreneur

Gregory Levey (born c. 1978) is a Canadian writer and entrepreneur. He is associate professor of professional communication at Toronto Metropolitan University, co-founder of the software company Figure 1, a journalist and an author.

== Career ==
Levey was a young law student at Fordham University in New York City when he was hired in 2004 as a speechwriter for the Israeli Delegation to the United Nations and then was a writer of speeches for an Anglophone audience for Israeli Prime Minister Ariel Sharon until 2006. He worked for some years as a journalist and freelance writer, then became a professor of communication at Ryerson University (now Toronto Metropolitan University) and co-foundered the software company Figure 1.

Levey's "controversial and much-discussed" 2009 magazine article, "Lament for the iGeneration", caused a stir with its assertion that a generation of students, the iGeneration, brought up on online, lack the skills and capacity to handle a post-secondary education.

== Figure 1 (corporation) ==
Levey co-founded the social media company Figure 1.

== Books ==
Levey's 2008 memoir, Shut Up, I'm Talking: And Other Diplomacy Lessons I Learned in the Israeli Government: A Memoir, recounts his stint as a speech writer at the United Nations. The book recounts how Levey, then a 20-year-old Law student, landed a job as a speechwriter for Prime Minister Ariel Sharon. The book's title went viral on social media.

Levey's second book, How to Make Peace in the Middle East in Six Months or Less: Without Leaving Your Apartment, was a satire of the Middle Eastern peace process.
