= Ironwood High School =

Coordinates: 33°36′09″N 112°11′20″W

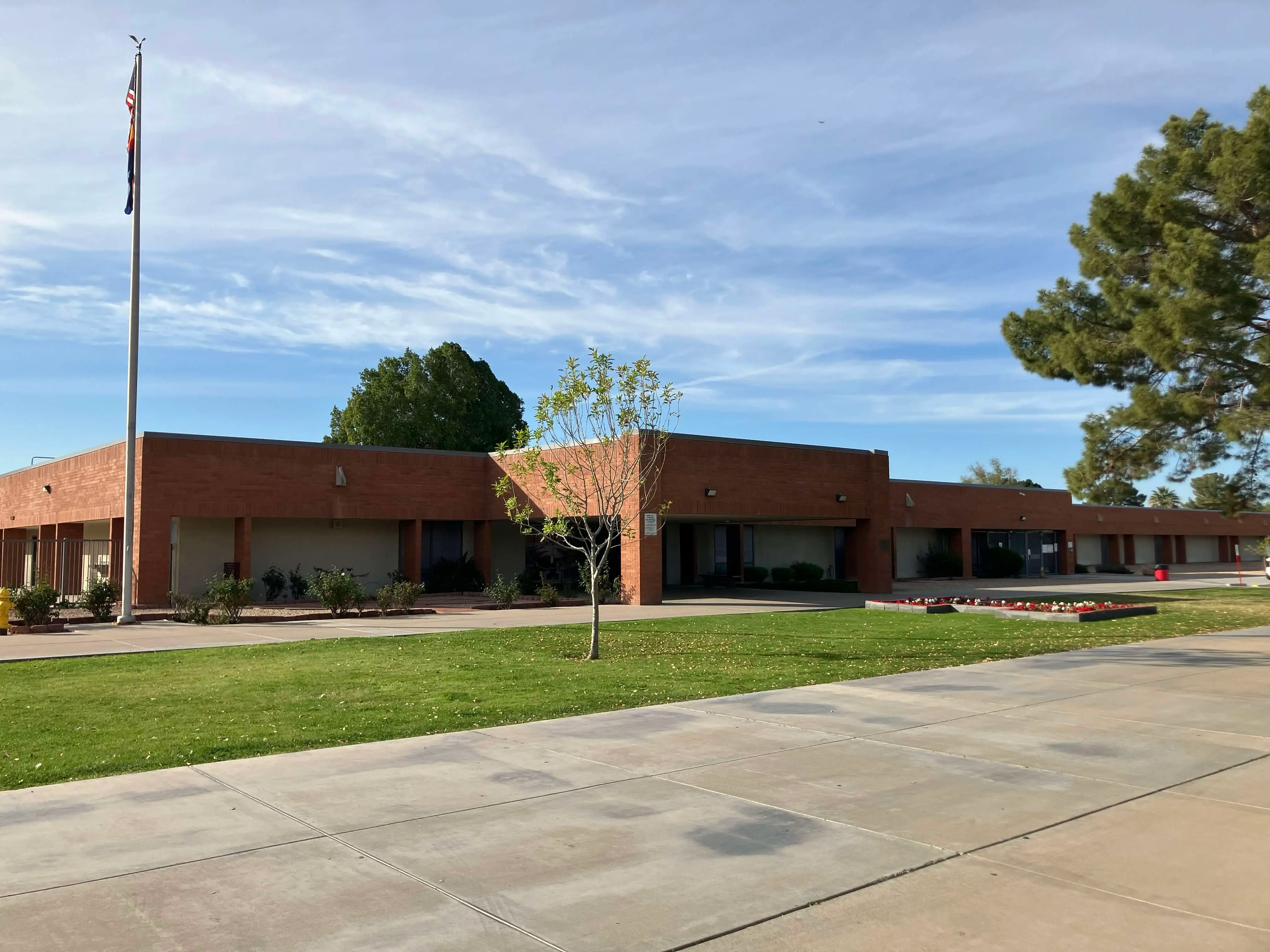

Location
- 6051 W Sweetwater Ave, Glendale AZ 85304

Information
- Type: Public Secondary
- Motto: It's Just Better Here #IJBH
- Established: 1986; 40 years ago
- Principal: Russell Dunham
- Teaching staff: 88.57 (FTE)
- Enrollment: 1,885 (2023-2024)
- Student to teacher ratio: 21.28
- Colors: Red and grey
- Mascot: Eagle
- AIA Class: 5A Conference
- Website: Ironwood Home Page

Ironwood High School is a public secondary school located in Glendale, Arizona, United States, part of the Peoria Unified School District. The school opened in August 1986 with its first graduating class in 1989. Since 2005, it has offered the IB Diploma Programme to its junior and senior year students, with a Pre-IB program for its freshman and sophomore-year students. It is the district's third-largest high school by enrollment.

== Academics ==
=== IB Program ===
In April 2005, Ironwood High School began to offer the International Baccalaureate Diploma Programme to juniors and seniors. Since 2005, the school has graduated over 100 full diploma members. Ironwood offers the standard five areas of English, History, Science (Physics and Biology), Foreign Language (French and Spanish), and Math, as well as numerous sixth area courses. The six area courses offered include Art, Computer Science, Economics, Music, Photo, Physics, and Theatre. The school also offers a two-year AIM program sponsored by the district in order to prepare pre-IB students. Ironwood offers the IB/AIM Club as a way to support IB and Pre-IB students.

=== Advanced Placement Program ===
Ironwood offers numerous Advanced Placement courses. These include higher level computer science, history, math, and science.

== Sports ==
Fall

- Football (male) State runners up: 1995, 1996, 2002, 2020
- Cheerleading (male and female)
- Volleyball (female)
- Badminton (female)
- Cross country (male and female)
- Swim and dive (male and female)
- Golf (male and female)
- Marching band - Ironwood Marching Eagle Regiment (male and female)

Winter

- Basketball (male and female) Mens Basketball State champions: 2020, 2024
- Wrestling (male and female) Mens Wrestling State Champions: 2023
- Soccer (male and female)
- Cheerleading (male and female)
- Drumline (male and female)

Spring

- Baseball (male) State runners up: 1999
- Softball (female)
- Track and field (male and female)
- Volleyball (male) State Runners up: 2016, 2023
- Tennis (male and female)

== Feeder schools ==
The following are K-8 schools that feed into Ironwood:

- Copperwood
- Desert Palms
- Desert Valley
- Heritage
- Marshall Ranch
- Sahuaro Ranch

== Notable alumni ==
- Noah Beck - social media personality (Class of 2019)
- Danny Cruz - soccer player, San Francisco Deltas (Class of 2007)
- Mackenzie Dern - six-time World Jiu-Jitsu Champion (Brazil), current Mixed Martial Artist (Class of 2011)
- Paul Ernster - National Football League punter (Class of 2000)
- Eric Hagg - National Football League safety (Nebraska) (Class of 2007)
- Alia Shelesh - YouTuber known has SSSniperWolf (Class of 2010)
- Joshua Sweeney - Paralympic gold medalist (Class of 2005)
