= Alex & Me =

2018 film

- Blu-ray cover
- Directed by: Eric Champnella
- Written by: Eric Champnella
- Produced by: Mike Karz; William Bindley
- Starring: Alex Morgan; Siena Agudong; Andrew Rush
- Cinematography: Alice Brooks
- Edited by: Maysie Hoy
- Music by: Philip White
- Production company: Gulfstream Pictures
- Distributed by: Warner Bros. Home Entertainment
- Release date: June 12, 2018
- Running time: 80 minutes
- Country: United States
- Language: English

Alex & Me is a 2018 American fantasy-sports comedy film written and directed by Eric Champnella in his feature film debut. The film stars soccer player Alex Morgan in her acting debut and Siena Agudong. It was released direct-to-video by Warner Bros. Home Entertainment on June 12, 2018.

== Plot ==
Reagan Wills (Siena Agudong) is excited about her try for the girls soccer club the Crush, the number one girls' soccer club in the state and 3-time Diamond Cup champion. However, her parents are preoccupied by recruiting visits for their son Logan, who is a star on his high school football team. On her way to the tryout, her bike chain breaks, causing her to be late. She tells the coach she plays striker, the position of nemesis and her coach's favorite Claire, who is paid by her father for every goal she scores.

After being cut from the team, Reagan calls a number of clubs, but all spots have been filled. While tearing down a poster of her favorite player Alex Morgan, she falls off a chair and hits her head. When she comes to, she sees Alex Morgan in her room but thinks it is just a hallucination caused by the fall. She accepts she is the only one that sees Alex and they begin to train together.

Her crush Ben tells her there may be a spot on a team called the Breakaways, a poorly played club formed by players who were rejected from Crush and is led by Nigel. At the tryout she discovers the team illegally practices on a field owned by the city, and that Lexi, their goalkeeper, is allergic to grass. Reagan makes the team and becomes their best player.

The city finds out about the practices and they are forced to move to a vacant lot across the street from Reagan's house. Their coach is replaced by Reagan's father after the girls find out he is not British and has no experience coaching soccer.

The Breakaways begin to improve and win games, trying to finish in the top 4 in their league in order to play in the Diamond Cup, a tournament of the best clubs in the state. Claire finds out the Breakaways qualified for the Diamond Cup and confronts Reagan, threatening to have her father buy the vacant lot where they practice. While Claire tries to tear down the Breakaways banner, Reagan hits her head. When she wakes up, she no longer sees Alex Morgan.

Reagan's team makes it to the Diamond Cup finals against the Crush. The game is played on the field where the US Women's soccer team practices. However, the Breakaways struggle in the 1st half, conceding 2 goals to the Crush. Before the 2nd half, Reagan inspires her teammates to prove everyone that they are champions and not the players who were rejected by Crush, regardless if they win or lose. With the help of Reagan, the Breakaways begin to tie the game 2-2. As Alex Morgan and other members of the national team look on, Reagan scores the winning goal in the final seconds, beating the Crush 3–2 in an upset and winning their 1st Diamond Cup title. Claire and her father leave in defeat.

After the game, Reagan meets her hero Alex Morgan and asks her for a favor. Alex makes an appearance at a fundraiser to help the Breakaways raise money to purchase the empty lot where they practice.

== Cast ==
- Alex Morgan as herself, Reagan's idol and the star forward of the United States women's national soccer team, who comes to life from the poster after Reagan bumps her head, though only Reagan can see her.
- Siena Agudong as Reagan Wills, a young 13-year-old girl who dreams of playing soccer just like Alex Morgan and is the main protagonist of the film.
- Matt Cornett as Logan Wills, Reagan's older brother who is a high school football player.
- Colin Critchley as Ben, Reagan's crush.
- Jerry Trainor as Coach Nigel, the former coach of the Breakaways who lies about being British and playing soccer.
- Jim Klock as Joe Wills, Reagan's father who becomes the new coach of Breakaways.
- Chuti Tiu as Anne Wills, Reagan's mother.
- Jessica Treska as Claire Bishop, Reagan's rival who is a striker for Crush and is the main antagonist of the film.
- Andrew Rush as Tom Bishop, Claire's father.
- James Moses Black as Coach Oz, the coach of Crush.
- Ava Acres as Gia
- Lily Mae Silverstein as Penny
- Julia Antonelli as Grace
- Mikari Tarpley as Lexi, the goalkeeper of Breakaways who is allergic to grass.
- Reagan Lake Champanella as Bug
- Joey Nader as Soccer Dad
- Dane Rhodes as College Football Coach
- Dylan Karz as Dylan
- Bronley Wittmann as Much Taller Girl
- Olivia Renee Dupree as Claire's friend
- Toney Chapman Steele as Parent
- Bruce Vincent Logan as Photographer (uncredited)
