= Version One Ventures =

Canadian venture-capital company

- Industry: Venture Capitalism
- Founder: Boris Wertz
- Headquarters: British Columbia, Canada
- Key people: Angela Tran Kingyens
- Services: Startup Investment
- Website: versionone.vc

Version One Ventures is a Vancouver-based, early-stage venture capital firm founded by Boris Wertz and run by him and his investing partner Angela Tran. The company provides investments to startups, primarily in SaaS, marketplace, cryptocurrency, financial tech, and healthcare industries.

Mr. Wertz raised his first, $18.7-million fund from outside investors in 2012. In October 2014, Version One announced the launch of their second fund ($35 Million) with Northleaf Venture Catalyst Fund and BDC Capital as the two anchor LPs. Up to this point, Version One Ventures has made investments in many companies including Figure 1, Mattermark, Wattpad, Uniswap, AngelList, Indochino, Volley and others.

== Company history ==
Version One Ventures was founded in July 2012.

== Boris Wertz ==
Boris Wertz started as an entrepreneur in 1999 founding the German company Just Books. This company was later purchased by Amazon.com in 2008 (a company Wertz couldn't compete with). which spurred Wertz to make the transition from entrepreneur to investor. He has now been an investor for approximately seven years, and was a board partner for the firm Andreessen Horowitz based in Silicon Valley. He has been publicly recognized for his entrepreneurial achievements.
