= Sidelined 2: Intercepted =

2025 American romantic comedy film

- Promotional poster
- Directed by: Justin Wu
- Written by: Crystal Ferreiro
- Based on: The QB and Me by Tay Marley
- Produced by: Lindsay MacAdam; Mckenna Marshall; Adam Wescott; Jason Fischer; Jason Goldberg; Aron Levitz; David Madden; Maxwell Mitcheson
- Starring: Siena Agudong; Noah Beck; Drew Ray Tanner; James Van Der Beek
- Cinematography: Mark Chow
- Edited by: Maureen Grant
- Music by: Brian H. Kim
- Production companies: Marshall Arts; Great Pacific Media; Wattpad Webtoon Studios
- Distributed by: Tubi
- Release date: November 27, 2025
- Running time: 101 minutes
- Country: United States
- Language: English

Sidelined 2: Intercepted is a 2025 American romantic comedy film. A sequel to Sidelined: The QB and Me (2024), Justin Wu returns as director, with Crystal Ferreiro as writer. Siena Agudong, Noah Beck, James Van Der Beek and Drew Ray Tanner reprise their roles.

The film was released on Tubi on November 27, 2025. A third and final film, Sidelined 3: End Game will premiere on November 26, 2026.

== Plot ==
Dallas and Drayton are still happily together, attending their dream colleges in Los Angeles, CalArts and USC respectively. They try to keep in touch via their cell phones. Just as Dallas and Drayton finally meet up, her best friend Gabby and his adoptive brother Josh call simultaneously to announce their breakup, saying high school relationships never last.

Dallas discovers her tuition has risen almost $20,000, thanks to inflation, so must find a job. Drayton, arriving late to practice because of traffic, is pulled from the starting lineup. Their coach keeps the team late, so he misses dinner with Dallas.

The coffee shop interview goes long and, although Dallas tells Skyler she does not really want to work there before realizing he is the manager, he hires her. In the meantime, Drayton is playing his first game of the season. In the final play, he injures his ACL. Dallas arrives just after, so seeks him in the hospital.

When Dallas finds Drayton, he is very dejected. She asks questions, but he is uncommunicative. Dallas then announces she got the café job, so can no longer meet on weekends. Offering to stay, Drayton sends her home as his father is around to help.

Drayton and Dallas try to attend a USC frat party, but as neither feels great, they leave. He is anxious to return to playing but everyone encourages him to rest his knee. Grumpy, Drayton lashes out at Dallas. Later, he apologizes and they have an okay date.

Skyler invites Dallas to dance in his new song's music video. Back at the coffee shop he mentions he has tickets to her showcase, where they both expect him to meet Drayton. Nate shows up, so he lets her off work.

When Nathan asks Dallas about things, she reveals she feels like she is being pulled in multiple directions at once. He talks about feeling purposeless since she left. When Dallas suggests he go back to college, he insists it has been too long.

Drayton first misses dinner with Nathan and Dallas then, soon after, her showcase. Afterwards he catches up with an upset Dallas. She feels humiliated because Drayton shows up so rarely, people think he does not exist. So they break up.

During fall break, Gabby comes to support Dallas, while Josh does for Drayton. The next day, Abby appears at Drayton's with a box of his belongings. Taking advantage of the opportunity, he finds Dallas at the café, proposing they parent trap Gabby and Josh, since they both miss each other.

Dallas and Drayton take Gabby and Josh individually to a Halloween party and, soon after, they are back together. Drayton proposes he and Dallas become friends but she insists that it is impossible.

Dallas's birthday soon comes up. She is out celebrating in a country western bar and, while Skyler sings her a song as a present, Drayton calls to wish her a happy birthday. They both talk about Thanksgiving, saying that they plan to stay in LA and not go home, so organize to spend the day together.

As Drayton and Dallas are making lunch, she gets a call back to dance in a New York City film starting soon. Hanging up, she is torn with the idea of taking it for not postponing her studies. Drayton suggests Dallas go for it.

After eating, they get cozy and then mutually decide to make love. Drayton wakes up the next day to find a note from Dallas. Apologizing for not saying goodbye, as it would have been too hard, and wishing him luck for the future.

Nathan is with Dallas as she packs up for New York. He reveals he has enrolled in college again. When Dallas mentions Drayton stayed in LA for Thanksgiving for the team, Nathan tells her he lied because he still loves her. Dallas realizes she must say goodbye to Drayton.

That night the football team has their final game determining if they go into the playoffs. Entering in the last five minutes, Drayton secures the win. Dallas finds him after to give him a proper goodbye. Kissing her, Drayton says it is goodbye for now, as they still could have a future later on.

== Cast ==
- Siena Agudong as Dallas Bryan
- Noah Beck as Drayton Lahey
- Charlie Gillespie as Skyler
- James Van Der Beek as Leroy Lahey
- Drew Ray Tanner as Nathan Bryan
- Asia Lizardo as Gabby
- Jason Fernandes as Josh Lahey
- Roan Curtis as Charlotte Carlisle
- Kolton Stewart as Zach Morgan
- Sage Linder as Miley
- Terry Mullany as Ryan Decker
- Michael Xavier as Coach Watson
- Dreyton Free as Marcus Redding
- Catherine Lough Haggquist as Dean Adams

== Production ==
On February 5, 2025, it was announced that a sequel for Sidelined: The QB and Me was in development with Noah Beck and Siena Agudong set to reprise their roles, Justin Wu returning as director and McKenna Marshall, Adam Wescott, Maxwell Mitcheson, Lindsay Macadam, Jason Fischer, Aron Levitz, David Madden and Jason Goldberg producing.

On March 27, 2025 it was revealed that the sequel would be titled Sidelined 2: Intercepted, and that James Van Der Beek and Drew Ray Tanner would reprise their roles, along Charlie Gillespie, Roan Curtis, Kolton Stewart, Sage Linder, Terry Mullany and Michael Xavier joining the cast.

Principal photography began on Victoria on March 10, 2025 and concluded on April 2, 2025.

== Release ==
The film was released on Tubi on November 27, 2025.

== Sequel ==
On May 7, 2026 it was announced that a third and final film was in development, with Noah Beck, Siena Agudong and Charlie Gillespie reprising their roles and Michael Medico as director, replacing Justin Wu, who directed the previous films.
