= Drew Ray Tanner =

Canadian actor (born 1992)

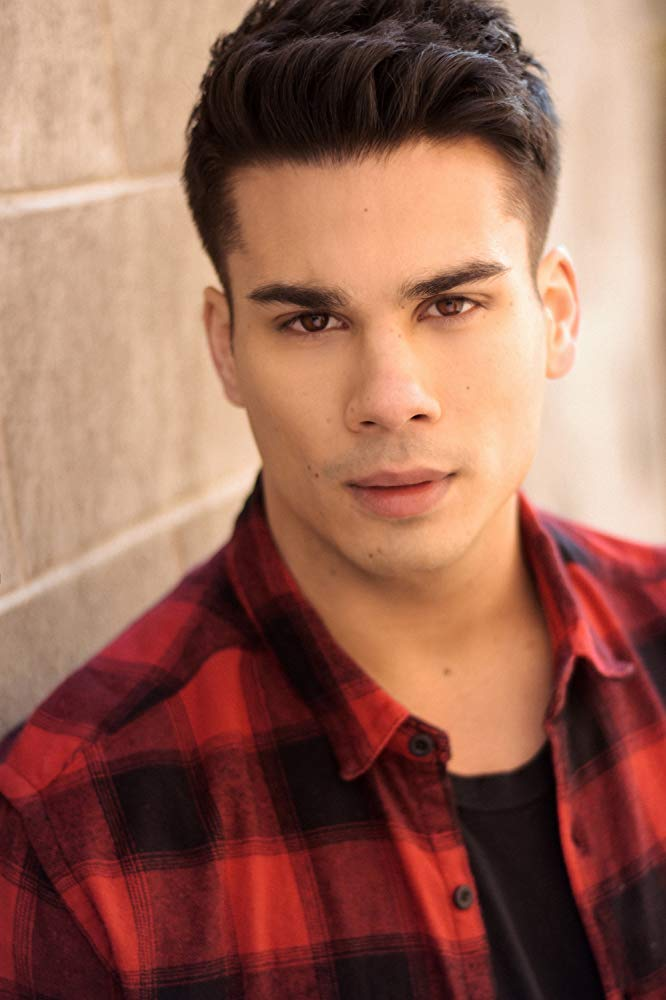
- Born: Victoria, British Columbia
- Occupation: Actor
- Years active: 2011–present
- Known for: Riverdale

Drew Ray Tanner (born 1992) is a Canadian actor best known for his role as Fangs Fogarty on Riverdale.

== Early life ==
Tanner was born in Victoria, British Columbia. When he was two years old, his father left, and his mother decided to move to Aldergrove, in Fraser Valley, British Columbia, where Tanner was raised. His mother is a teacher and he has an older brother. Tanner's grandfather would often do magic tricks and involve Tanner when he was child, which inspired him to join the entertainment industry. In eighth and ninth grade, Tanner participated in a local improv group. He attended Aldergrove Community Secondary School and later transferred to W. J. Mouat Secondary School. He also played football. Tanner received the role of John Proctor in a production of The Crucible at his school. During his teenage years, Tanner also formed a rap group with a friend. Following his high school graduation, Tanner turned down football scholarships and began working at a local tire retread plant so that he could support himself and travel to Vancouver for auditions.

== Career ==
In 2015, Tanner auditioned for the roles of Jughead Jones and Reggie Mantle in Riverdale, but did not receive either role. In 2016, Tanner's friends invited him to visit Rocko's Diner in Mission, British Columbia, which is famous for its milkshakes and was used as the filming location for diner scenes in Riverdale. When they arrived, there was a line of fans around the corner and Tanner made it his goal to have a role on Riverdale. When season two of the show began casting, Tanner auditioned for the role of Sweet Pea. While auditioning, he noted they were also casting for the role of Fangs Fogarty, so Tanner went in and auditioned for Fangs's character as well. Tanner joined the cast of Riverdale as Fangs Fogarty, the love interest of Kevin Keller, during season two, which began airing in 2017. Originally, Tanner was only supposed to appear in a couple episodes, but he was brought back several times until season four, when his character had a role in a major story arc. After three years in a recurring role, Tanner was promoted to be a series regular for season five of the show, which aired in 2021.

Tanner and his Riverdale co-star Vanessa Morgan bonded on set over their love of music and formed a group, These Girls These Boys. They released their first single, Sleep When I'm Dead, in May 2020.

In 2019, Tanner appeared in the Netflix film Work It as the romantic interest of one of the main characters. The role required Tanner to engage in improvisational acting. To prepare for the role, he lost nineteen pounds in twenty-one days through an intensive diet and training program.

== Personal life ==
Tanner is biracial.

== Filmography ==
=== Film ===
Year	Title	Role	Notes	Ref.
2014	Mom's Day Away	Richie		
2014	Zapped	Shirtless Guy		
2015	All of My Heart	Rusty		
2015	Liar, Liar, Vampire	Band Singer		
2015	Once Upon a Holiday	Concierge		
2016	Dater's Handbook	Phil		
2016	Date With Love	Colin Hartling		
2016	Home	Mirrored Goggles		
2017	The Birthday Wish	Kian		
2017	Power Rangers	Young Lover #2		
2017	Like Cats and Dogs	Tyler		
2017	All for Love	P.J. Salazar		
2017	All of My Heart: Inn Love	Rusty		
2018	Secret Millionaire	Parking Attendant	as "Drew Tanner"	
2020	Work It	Charlie		
2024	Boot Camp	Axel Chandler		
2024	Sidelined: The QB and Me	Nathan Bryan		
2025	Sidelined 2: Intercepted	Nathan Bryan		

=== Television ===
Year	Title	Role	Notes	Ref.
2011	The Haunting Hour: The Series	Michael	as "Drew Tanner"	
2012	Fairly Legal	Elevator Person #4	1 episode	
2013	Arrow	Rookie	1 episode	
2013	Motive	Tyson	1 episode	
2015	iZombie	Sam		
2016	Supernatural	Cliff	1 episode	
2017	Supergirl	Student	1 episode	
2017	Somewhere Between	Jesse Reed / Jessie Reed	Recurring role	
2017–2023	Riverdale	Fangs Fogarty	Recurring (Seasons 2–4); Main (Season 5-7)	
2018	You Me Her	Alex	2 episodes	
2019	The Order	Todd	1 episode	
2020	50 States of Fright	David Freeman		
2020	Legends of Tomorrow	Dion/Dionysus		
