= Sidelined: The QB and Me =

2024 American romantic drama film

- Promotional poster
- Directed by: Justin Wu
- Written by: Crystal Ferreiro; Mary Gulino
- Based on: The QB and Me by Tay Marley
- Produced by: Mckenna Marshall; Aron Levitz; Lindsey Ramey; Adam Wescott
- Starring: Siena Agudong; Noah Beck; Drew Ray Tanner; James Van Der Beek; Deborah Cox
- Cinematography: Mark Chow
- Edited by: Maureen Grant
- Music by: Nikhil Seetharam
- Production companies: Marshall Arts; Great Pacific Media; Wattpad Webtoon Studios
- Distributed by: Tubi
- Release date: November 29, 2024
- Running time: 99 minutes
- Country: United States
- Language: English

Sidelined: The QB and Me is a 2024 American romantic comedy film based on The QB and Me novel by Tay Marley. Directed by Justin Wu and written by Crystal Ferreiro and Mary Gulino, the film stars Siena Agudong, Noah Beck, Drew Ray Tanner, James Van Der Beek and Deborah Cox.

The film was released on November 29, 2024 on Tubi. A sequel, Sidelined 2: Intercepted, was released on November 27, 2025.

== Plot ==
Headstrong dancer Dallas Bryan transfers to a public Texas high school for her senior year, where her best friend Abby attends and her brother and guardian Nathan is the football coach. Upon her arrival, star quarterback Drayton Lahey makes a flashy entrance on his motorcycle. He then cockily enters late to their shared English class.

After football practice, Drayton asks his kid brother Josh about the new girl. He discovers Dallas is coach's off-limits, younger sister. Asking Nathan why they are not finishing yet, he discovers his father is pressuring him to ride them hard, against his suggestion.

After practice, Nathan encourages Drayton to explore his college options. The quarterback insists his father expects he attend Waco, as a legacy. Nathan acknowledges the pressure Drayton is under, having once been a star quarterback himself, but mentions he could become professional.

Outside, directly after practice, Drayton flirts with Dallas, who notes his arrogance. Then his teammate throws him a football and he accidentally breaks her car's driver mirror. Drayton apologizes and his brother Josh gives her a lift.

Dallas expresses frustration to Nathan as her dance teacher criticized her CalArts audition piece for feeling too rehearsed. Under pressure, with the cheer squad and the audition piece, she feels she does not have enough time. Nathan suggests she socialize more so as to obsess less.

Dallas and Abby attend the senior class party, finding both Drayton and Josh. Drayton continues pushing for a date with Dallas, so they play beer pong with water. She wins, walks away, then is disgusted to see another girl hitting on Drayton.

Dallas gets very drunk, after which Drayton finds her trying to walk home. He gives her a ride on his motorcycle, not wanting to go home drunk. Dallas sleeps in his room, surprised Drayton does not try anything. The next morning, hungover, she slips out.

A week later the team has an overnight away game. After the team's win, almost everyone parties in one of the rooms. Dallas is not interested, so Drayton takes her out salsa dancing. On their return to the motel, Nathan catches them, chewing them out. At school on Monday both Drayton and Dallas are reprimanded by the principal, receiving a one-week suspension.

Furious, Dallas refuses to talk to Drayton. However, he shows up at the dance studio, so her dance instructor Alicia convinces him to dance with her. Afterwards, Drayton suggests they fly to CalArt to see the campus. She tours the school, while he has other appointments.

Meeting later, they share more about each other, then play truth or dare, resulting in kissing. However, Dallas puts off anything more, suggesting they go to sleep. The next morning, she friend zones him, calling him 'bud'.

Once home, Dallas meets with Drayton. He directly says he likes her, proposing they go for it or not. Dallas decides yes with a kiss and they are intimate. Dallas and Drayton are then inseparable. As they get even closer, he reveals his twin Abigail disappeared when they were eight, assumed dead a short time later.

At Drayton's 18th birthday party, Drayton and his father argue over which college he might attend. Dallas excuses herself and leaves, Drayton soon follows. She confronts him, asking if he is considering California colleges for her. Dallas exclaims they have a impending finishing date, so they break up.

Dallas isolates herself for the next three weeks, going to the dance studio distracted. Finally Abby turns up, chewing her out for being self-absorbed. Dallas she did not even support her when Princeton rejected her.

Nathan surprises Dallas with tickets to audition at CalArts in person. Afterwards, her mother's college roommate and friend introduces herself. Then she says unofficially that Dallas will be admitted.

Dallas first makes up with Abby, then afterwards tells Drayton her news about CalArts. He congratulates her and they eventually get back together as she has decided to live in the moment.

Drayton sends Dallas off to college by plane. A few days later, he shows up with a USC sweatshirt, revealing he is also studying in LA. Elated, she jumps into his arms and they kiss.

== Cast ==
- Siena Agudong as Dallas Bryan
- Noah Beck as Drayton Lahey
- Drew Ray Tanner as Nathan Bryan
- James Van Der Beek as Leroy Lahey
- Deborah Cox as Miss Alicia
- Asia Lizardo as Gabby
- Jake Foy as Mr. Justin Douglas
- Kendall Cross as Ellie Lahey
- Jason Fernandes as Josh Lahey

== Production ==
On March 31, 2022 it was announced that Noah Beck would executive produce and star in The QB and Me, a film adaptation of Tay Marley's novel of the same name. It was also revealed that Mary Gulino would write the film. Aron Levitz, Lindsey Weems Ramey, Adam Wescott, Nick Phillips and McKenna Marshall would produce the film, with Maxwell Mitcheson as executive producer.

Later, on June 6, 2024, it was announced that the film, retitled as Sidelined: The QB and Me, would premiere on Tubi, with Justin Wu as director. It was also announced that James Van Der Beek, Siena Agudong, Drew Ray Tanner, Deborah Cox and Jake Foy would star in the film.

Principal photography began on Victoria, on May 29, 2024, and concluded on June 21, 2024.

== Release ==
The film premiered on Tubi on November 29, 2024.

== Sequel ==
On February 5, 2025 it was announced that a sequel was in development. Sidelined 2: Intercepted premiered on Tubi on November 27, 2025.
