= Star Falls =

American sitcom

- Genre: Comedy
- Created by: George Doty IV
- Starring: Siena Agudong; Kamaia Fairburn; Elena V. Wolfe; Dion Johnstone; Jadiel Dowlin; Marcus Cornwall
- Composers: Craig Robert McConnell; Justin Forsley
- Country of origin: United States
- Original language: English
- No. of seasons: 1
- No. of episodes: 20

Production
- Executive producers: George Doty IV; Joan Lambur; Nat Abraham; Ira Levy; Michael McGuigan; Peter Williamson
- Producer: Jim Corston
- Production locations: Toronto, Ontario, Canada; Port Hope, Ontario, Canada
- Camera setup: Single-camera
- Running time: 21–22 minutes
- Production companies: Breakthrough Entertainment; Nickelodeon Productions

Original release
- Network: Nickelodeon; TeenNick
- Release: March 31 – September 2, 2018

Star Falls is an American sitcom created by George Doty IV that aired on Nickelodeon from March 31 to July 28, 2018, and on TeenNick from August 5 to September 2, 2018. The series stars Siena Agudong, Kamaia Fairburn, Elena V. Wolfe, Dion Johnstone, Jadiel Dowlin, and Marcus Cornwall.

== Premise ==
Craig Brooks is a popular Hollywood actor, and the father of Diamond, Phoenix, and Bo Brooks. For his latest movie role, he temporarily moves his family to the town of Star Falls, where his movie is being filmed. While there, Diamond Brooks befriends a local girl, Sophia Miller. Sophia and Diamond team up to set their parents up with each other.

== Cast ==
=== Main ===
- Siena Agudong as Sophia Miller
- Kamaia Fairburn as Diamond Brooks
- Elena V. Wolfe as Beth
- Dion Johnstone as Craig
- Jadiel Dowlin as Phoenix Brooks
- Marcus Cornwall as Bo Brooks

=== Recurring ===
- Tomaso Sanelli as Nate
- Shawn Lawrence as Lou
- Liz Johnston as Ginger

== Production ==
The series from Breakthrough Entertainment was green-lit with a 20-episode order on November 13, 2017.

== Broadcast and release ==
Star Falls premiered on Nickelodeon on March 31, 2018. The first two episodes of the series were made available on the Nickelodeon website with no login required, and on the Nick app, on March 9, 2018.

Broadcast of the series moved to TeenNick on August 5, 2018, starting with the twelfth episode.

== Ratings ==
Viewership and ratings per season of Star Falls
| Season | Episodes | First aired | | Last aired | | Avg. viewers (millions) |
| Season | Episodes | Date | Viewers (millions) | Date | Viewers (millions) | Avg. viewers (millions) |
|---|---|---|---|---|---|---|
| 1 | 20 | March 31, 2018 | 0.73 | September 2, 2018 | 0.07 | 0.38 |

== Episodes ==
| No. | Title | Directed by | Written by | Original release date | Prod. code | U.S. viewers (millions) |
|---|---|---|---|---|---|---|
| 1 | "The Celebrity Setup" | Stefan Scaini | George Doty IV | March 31, 2018 | 101 | 0.73 |
Additional cast: Tomaso Sanelli as Nate, Shawn Lawrence as Lou, Steve Whistance-Smith as Janitor, Joseph Cochrane as Mover
| 2 | "The Everything Wash" | Steve Wright | Jennifer Daley | April 7, 2018 | 102 | 0.62 |
Additional cast: Tomaso Sanelli as Nate, Shawn Lawrence as Lou, Liz Johnston as Ginger, Margaret Mactavish as Woman on Lawn Mower
| 3 | "The Assistant" | Stefan Scaini | Ethan Banville | April 14, 2018 | 107 | 0.60 |
Additional cast: Tomaso Sanelli as Nate, Shawn Lawrence as Lou, Liz Johnston as Ginger, Daniel Stolfi as Props Guy
| 4 | "The Birthday" | Steve Wright | Daphne Ballon | April 21, 2018 | 103 | 0.60 |
Additional cast: Tomaso Sanelli as Nate, Shawn Lawrence as Lou, Liz Johnston as Ginger
| 5 | "The Owl Bomb" | Stefan Scaini | Laura Seaton | April 28, 2018 | 108 | 0.73 |
Additional cast: Tomaso Sanelli as Nate, Shawn Lawrence as Lou, Liz Johnston as Ginger
| 6 | "The Play" | Steve Wright | Cole Bastedo | June 9, 2018 | 104 | 0.47 |
Additional cast: Tomaso Sanelli as Nate, Shawn Lawrence as Lou, Jordan Baker as Sophia Photo Double
| 7 | "The Picnic Auction" | Steve Wright | Cole Bastedo | June 16, 2018 | 109 | 0.60 |
Additional cast: Tomaso Sanelli as Nate, Shawn Lawrence as Lou, Amanda Barker as Woman #1, Josette Jorge as Joanna
| 8 | "The Mole" | Steve Wright | Jennifer Daley | June 23, 2018 | 105 | 0.56 |
Additional cast: Tomaso Sanelli as Nate, Shawn Lawrence as Lou, Liz Johnston as Ginger, Nneka Elliott as Reporter
| 9 | "The Co-Star" | Steve Wright | Meghan Read | June 30, 2018 | 111 | 0.43 |
Additional cast: Tomaso Sanelli as Nate, Natalie Lisinska as Cynthia
| 10 | "The Pet Whisperer" | Stefan Scaini | Daphne Ballon | July 14, 2018 | 106 | 0.70 |
Additional cast: Tomaso Sanelli as Nate, Shawn Lawrence as Lou, Jamaal Grant as Father, Mikayla Radan as Tania Absent: Dion Johnstone as Craig, Marcus Cornwall as Bo Brooks
| 11 | "The Red Carpet" | Steve Wright | Jennifer Daley | July 28, 2018 | 110 | 0.59 |
Additional cast: Tomaso Sanelli as Nate, Shawn Lawrence as Lou, Liz Johnston as Ginger, Tracey Beltrano as Clara, Jonathan Goldapple as Reporter
| 12 | "The Creth" | Steve Wright | Jennifer Daley | August 5, 2018 | 112 | 0.14 |
Additional cast: Tomaso Sanelli as Nate, Liz Johnston as Ginger, Tony Nappo as Vince, Latoya Webb as Café Worker #1, Umed Amin as Café Worker #2
| 13 | "The Fall of the Owl" | Mars Horodyski | Cole Bastedo | August 5, 2018 | 114 | 0.10 |
Additional cast: Tomaso Sanelli as Nate, Shawn Lawrence as Lou, Liz Johnston as Ginger, Matt Baram as Mr. Peterson, Scott Hurst as Patron #1, Minh Ly as Patron #2, Christie Stewart as Patron #3 Absent: Elena V. Wolfe as Beth
| 14 | "The Engagement" | Mars Horodyski | Laura Seaton | August 12, 2018 | 113 | 0.12 |
Additional cast: Tomaso Sanelli as Nate, Clyde Whitham as Farmer, Jonathan Gould as Banjo Player
| 15 | "The Boys vs. the Girls" | Mars Horodyski | Ethan Banville | August 12, 2018 | 116 | 0.12 |
Additional cast: Tomaso Sanelli as Nate, Shawn Lawrence as Lou, Rob Ramsay as Exterminator
| 16 | "The Camping Trip" | Mars Horodyski | Jennifer Daley | August 19, 2018 | 115 | 0.07 |
Additional cast: Tomaso Sanelli as Nate, Shawn Lawrence as Lou, Christo Graham as Delivery Guy
| 17 | "The Mystery Artist" | Don McCutcheon | Cole Bastedo | August 19, 2018 | 119 | 0.06 |
Additional cast: Tomaso Sanelli as Nate, Shawn Lawrence as Lou, Liz Johnston as Ginger, Jason Blake as Customer
| 18 | "The Family Picnic" | Don McCutcheon | Laura Seaton | August 26, 2018 | 118 | 0.10 |
Additional cast: Liz Johnston as Ginger, Milton Barnes as Emcee, Monica Dotter as Kate King, David Ingram as Kevin King, Madison Ferguson as Kimmy King, Mathew Edmondson as Kris King, Jayne Eastwood as Granny King
| 19 | "The Stranding and the Dresses" | Don McCutcheon | Jennifer Daley | August 26, 2018 | 117 | 0.09 |
Additional cast: Shawn Lawrence as Lou, Boyd Banks as Security Guard, Arlene Duncan as Sales Woman
| 20 | "The Wedding" | Don McCutcheon | George Doty IV | September 2, 2018 | 120 | 0.07 |
Additional cast: Tomaso Sanelli as Nate, Shawn Lawrence as Lou, Liz Johnston as Ginger, Tyler Murree as Speedmeyer
