= Soul's Road =

2024 Canadian drama film directed by Joel Stewart

- Directed by: Joel Stewart
- Written by: John K. MacDonald
- Produced by: Don Depoe; Michael Feehan; John K. MacDonald
- Starring: Dallas Smith; Camille Stopps; Charlie Gillespie; Allan Hawco
- Cinematography: Asaf Benny
- Edited by: Dean Evans
- Music by: Stew Kirkwood
- Production company: Dept. 9 Studios
- Release date: September 27, 2024 (CIFF)
- Running time: 101 minutes
- Country: Canada
- Language: English

Soul's Road is a Canadian drama film, directed by Joel Stewart and released in 2024. Stewart's directorial debut, the film stars Dallas Smith as Ronan Garrett, a disgraced rock star returning to his hometown for the first time since burning his bridges when he left town a decade earlier in pursuit of fame and fortune.

The cast also includes Camille Stopps, Nik Belitchenko, Clayton Bellamy, Eli Bradley, Geordie Cheeseman, Josh Collins, Kevin Corey, Heather Decksheimer, Celeste Desjardins, Tom Edwards, Martin Galba, Charlie Gillespie, Allan Hawco, Tanner David Hayden, Kirk Heuser, Sue Huff and Abigail Issler in supporting roles.

== Production ==
The film was shot in fall 2023 in Edmonton, Alberta.

In addition to musical performances by Smith in the narrative, the film's soundtrack also includes songs by Blue Rodeo, The Dead South, Northern Beauties, Mike Plume and Lawrence Gowan.

== Distribution ==
The film premiered at the 2024 Calgary International Film Festival, before going into commercial release in 2025.

== Critical response ==
Liam Lacey of Original Cin wrote that "Smith’s musical performances in the film, which are big on power chords, anthemic hooks, and gravel-voiced melancholy, help fill some the film’s emotional weak spots. What primarily distinguishes this lowkey, unsurprising drama is a well-stocked soundtrack, courtesy of music supervisor Natasha Duprey, amounting to a survey of Canadian alt-country songs over the past three-and-a-half decades."

== Awards ==
Ashly Mckessock received a Canadian Screen Award nomination for Best Makeup at the 14th Canadian Screen Awards in 2026.
