= No Good Nick =

2019 American comedy streaming television series

- Genre: Comedy drama; Sitcom
- Created by: David H. Steinberg; Keetgi Kogan
- Written by: David H. Steinberg; Keetgi Kogan; Erika Kaestle; Patrick McCarthy; Eric Goldberg; Peter Tibbals; David Tolentino; Stefanie Leder; Johanna Stokes; Emily Schmidt; Teddy Steinkellner
- Directed by: Andy Fickman; Bob Koherr; Phill Lewis; Eric Dean Seaton; Erika Kaestle; Robbie Countryman; Jody Margolin Hahn
- Starring: Siena Agudong; Lauren Donzis; Kalama Epstein; Sean Astin; Melissa Joan Hart
- Composer: Chris Alan Lee
- Country of origin: United States
- Original language: English
- No. of seasons: 1 (2 parts)
- No. of episodes: 20

Production
- Executive producers: David H. Steinberg; Keetgi Kogan
- Producer: Pixie Wespiser
- Cinematography: John Simmons
- Editors: Timothy Ryder; Chris Harvey
- Camera setup: Multi-camera
- Running time: 25–33 minutes
- Production company: Iron Triangle Productions

Original release
- Network: Netflix
- Release: April 15 – August 5, 2019

No Good Nick is an American comedy-drama television series, created by David H. Steinberg and Keetgi Kogan. The series stars Siena Agudong, Lauren Donzis, Kalama Epstein, Melissa Joan Hart and Sean Astin, and the first part premiered on April 15, 2019, on Netflix. Part two was released on August 5, 2019. In September 2019, it was announced that the series was canceled after one season.

== Premise ==
Thirteen-year-old Nicole "Nick" Franzelli was raised by her father Tony who ran the popular Franzelli's restaurant in Portland, Oregon. After Liz Thompson opened her rival Crescendo Restaurant across the street, the Thompson family used dirty tactics to drive Franzelli's out of business. Tony borrowed money from the mob in a desperate effort to keep his restaurant afloat and then went to prison for robbing a convenience store to meet his repayments to the mob. Taken into state care, Nick was placed with corrupt foster parents Sam and Dorothy Harbaugh, who trained her as a con artist.

The series begins as Nick infiltrates the Thompson home under the alias "Nicole Patterson," claiming that her parents recently died in a car crash and the family are her closest living relatives. Under the influence of her father and the Harbaughs, Nick endeavors to steal money and valuables from the Thompsons and wreak revenge on them. However, as she becomes increasingly attached to the family, Nick's loyalties are divided and she struggles to carry out her plan.

== Genre ==
Reviews note the difficulty in classifying the genre of No Good Nick, citing that, although it casts veteran child stars of Disney, Freeform, and Nickelodeon, the series features themes more attuned to adults such as physical violence and drama.

== Cast and characters ==
=== Main ===
- Siena Agudong as Nick, a teenage con artist who is planning to rob the Thompson family and gain revenge on them for ruining her father's business.
- Lauren Donzis as Molly, the youngest Thompson child, a student and an environmental activist with a large online following, who frequently stoops to coercive methods to impose her beliefs on those around her. Molly previously used her knowledge of social media to fabricate negative reviews of Franzelli's and hurt the restaurant's rating.
- Kalama Epstein as Jeremy, the eldest Thompson child, an overachieving high-school sophomore who is suspicious of Nick. He previously stole menus that Nick had printed to promote Franzelli's. He later comes out as gay to his family.
- Sean Astin as Ed, the patriarch of the Thompson household and a senior loan officer at Overton Bank, where Tony Franzelli was a longstanding client. Ed previously abused his position to deny Franzelli a loan extension, leading to his borrowing money from the mob.
- Melissa Joan Hart as Liz, the matriarch of the Thompson household, a chef, and owner of the Crescendo Restaurant. She aspires to appear on Top Chef. A ruthless businesswoman, Liz originally has no reservation about crushing rival businesses like Franzelli's, but she regardless still cares very much for her family and did not mean any harm.

=== Recurring ===
- Kyla Drew-Simmons as Becky, activist and leader of the volunteer squad, Molly's frenemy
- Sanai Victoria as Tamika, member of the volunteer squad
- Tiana Le as Xuan, member of the volunteer squad
- Eddie McClintock as Tony Franzelli, Nick's father. While incarcerated, he has Nick gain revenge on the Thompsons and obtain money so that he can continue to meet his repayments to the mob. For the first half of the series, he lies to Nick telling her the money is paying a lawyer.
- Ted McGinley and Molly Hagan as Sam and Dorothy Harbaugh, Nick's corrupt foster parents. They train their many foster children as con artists and thieves to steal money and valuables on their behalf. Dorothy also poses as a social services coordinator to endorse Nick's credentials.
- Alex Poncio as Jim, Jeremy's friend
- August Kamp as Eric, Jeremy's love interest
- Marco Sanchez as Eduardo, an employee of the Crescendo Restaurant
- Lori Mae Hernandez as Riley, Nick's childhood best friend
- Josie Totah as Lisa Haddad, a high-school senior who competes with Jeremy for student council president
- Jerry Trainor as Todd, an accomplice of Nick
- Anthony Turpel as Will, Nick's love interest and a spy for the Harbaughs
- Gavin Lewis as Omar, another of Sam and Dorothy's foster children. Nick uses his image to create a GoFundMe campaign to raise $10,000 for her dad
- Jonathan Silverman as Paul, a worker for the mob boss who Tony owes money.

=== Guest stars ===
- Ana Rey as Sheri ("The Catfish")
- Elaine Kao as Ms. Lee ("The Catfish")

== Episodes ==
No.	Title	Directed by	Written by	Original release date
Part 1
1	"The Catfish"	Andy Fickman	David H. Steinberg & Keetgi Kogan	April 15, 2019
Nick, a teenage con artist enters the Thompson family as a distant cousin (Hence the title The Catfish). The family consists of Ed (dad) a senior loan officer at a bank, Liz (mom) a chef who owns a restaurant, Jeremy (son) and Molly (daughter). Nick's partner in crime Dorothy Harbaugh posing as social services coordinator establishes her credentials. Molly shares her room with Nick. She begins going to school, where Jeremy is a sophomore class rep. She starts working in Liz's restaurant in the kitchen after school. The family arranges a welcome dinner for Nick but Jeremy does not trust her so she decides to pull off the heist that night itself by giving them chloroformed cider. After listening to the emotional speeches the family members give while toasting her, she postpones her heist. The episode ends with her talking on the phone with her dad Tony.
2	"The Pig in the Poke"	Andy Fickman	David H. Steinberg & Keetgi Kogan	April 15, 2019
While talking to her dad, it is revealed that he and Nick have an ulterior motive. Her dad warns her against getting attached to the Thompsons. Liz is looking for some ideas to increase sales in her restaurant and Nick comes up with the idea of a wine tasting weekend. Crescendo, the restaurant, fully books up for the event with the help of Molly's social media recommendation. In the chores market bidding for pocket allowance, Nick outsmarts Jeremy and Molly applying Monopoly tricks. During the wine tasting weekend, Nick plays her scam by pasting labels of high-end wine on cheap wine bottles and passing them to diners (Hence the title The Pig in the Poke). She is grossly disappointed when she finds out from her guardians and partner scammers that $5000 worth of wine bottles can't be fenced off without the original labels. The wine tasting event in restaurant was a huge success. Liz and Ed invite Nick for celebrations but as Liz lifts the wine bottle the label falls off breaking the bottle. The episode ends with Ed calling Molly for clean up.
3	"The Money-Box Scheme"	Andy Fickman	Erika Kaestle & Patrick McCarthy	April 15, 2019
As Molly cleans up the kitchen Jeremy complains that they are doing the chores while Nick is watching videos. Liz informs them that the restaurant is booked solid for the next two months and that they sold $8000 worth of wine. Nick receives a call from her dad asking for money. Nick approaches the 'volunteer squad' to plan her next scam. She suggests that they fine costume dancers who wear insensitive and offensive costume at the school dance. Later they can hire a cultural sensitivity trainer with the collected fine. Jeremy authorizes a $5 fine to avoid scandal and boycott of the event. They start collecting fines from costume dancers and put the money in a locked box. As Nick comes in, she starts fining students but puts the money in a similar box that she is carrying and switches the boxes after the dance (Hence the title The Money-Box Scheme). In all this Jeremy is prevented from going to his own event. Nick makes around $700 from the scam. At the end of the night the box didn't contain enough money to hire a trainer so the volunteer squad donate the money and Nick gives Jeremy a certificate of appreciation for the donation. Jeremy is still suspicious of Nick so he makes inquiries about Dorothy from Social Services.
4	"The Badger Game"	Andy Fickman	Eric Goldberg & Peter Tibbals	April 15, 2019
Jeremy informs Nick that Dorothy is not level. Nick's dad tells her on phone that 'con' is short of confidence so she should win Jeremy's trust. Molly informs Nick that since Student Body President has moved away there will be election in 3 days. She convinces Jeremy to run for it against Lisa Haddad to become the youngest Student Body President. She appoints herself his campaign manager and in her own words 'Electrol Sherpa' to do that uphill task. Nick canvasses students to vote for Jeremy by appealing to their ethnicity or various interests. She gives Jeremy an estimate of his win being 321 to 299 votes. While making his election speech Jeremy makes several faux pas and is booed off. The teacher in charge gives the box of votes to a student to take it to front office and Nick pushes the box out of his hands making it look like an accident. While picking up the box, she switches the votes. Jeremy wins the election. As Jeremy thanks Nick, she tells him that they are family and so they cover for each other. She feels she has won his trust. The winning margin was the same (321 to 299), as given earlier by Nick. This makes him wonder if something is fishy. Title reference: Badger game or The Badger Game
5	"The Pigeon Drop"	Bob Koherr	David H. Steinberg & Keetgi Kogan	April 15, 2019
Nick's dad tells her on the phone that the lawyer Walter Strickland has agreed to take his case for $5000 to be delivered on Saturday at noon. Nick's accomplice Todd (Jerry Trainor) robs the Thompson's open garage. On Saturday, Ed arranges for the installation of a security system because of the robbery and declares it the Thompson family 'safety day', so they are locked in for the next 3 hours. After completion of phase 1, emergency preparation drill, Nick asks Todd to deliver the money to her in the house hidden in a pizza box. Everyone enjoys the second phase, security training, but Nick leaves the house on pretext of wanting to watching her dad's favorite movie, alone. She delivers the money in front of the lawyer's office to an imposter. Ed declares the Thompson family safety day a success. Title reference: The Pigeon Drop.
6	"The Glim Dropper"	Bob Koherr	David Tolentino	April 15, 2019
Sam is becoming impatient with Nick as he is not getting any money from her. Nick tells her dad that she wants to stop conning and be happy like they were before. Nick tries to pry out from Liz where cash is kept in the restaurant. To her disappointment she learns that it is all cashless, but she learns that Liz takes off her jewelry before cooking. Jeremy wants Ed to chaperone the team building exercise for the Student Council which is an escape room. Molly and Liz patch up with Nick's efforts, and cook together Molly's favorite mousse and ladyfingers. Nick then steals Liz's ring and calls Sam to come at midnight to collect a 'super valuable ring'. At midnight, Nick comes down and finds Liz looking for her ring. She has taken the sink apart. When Nick learns that Liz has a very emotional attachment to the ring, she pretends to find it and gives it back to Liz. Finding the ring makes Liz happy. When Sam comes to take the ring Nick gives him four napkin rings, which angers him. He tells her that he is 'pulling the plug' and asks Nick to pack her bags and come home there and then. Title reference: Glim-Dropper
7	"The Charity Mugger"	Bob Koherr	Stefanie Leder	April 15, 2019
Sam and Dorothy want money faster but Nick tells them that she will get it for them on her timeline. Nick sets up an online GoFundMe charity fraud in the name of Omar, another foster care child of Sam and Dorothy. Her request for opening a bank account is turned down as her being a minor means her parents have to sign. She goes to Ed for that. Liz gives the job of busboy to Jeremy so that he can save to buy a car. Nick pits Becky and Molly against each other to raise $10,000 for Omar. Ed is tracking her account as a parent so when she transfers the money to her account he sees. Nick makes up a story about helping Omar. Ed arranges a ceremony to hand over the check to Omar and publicize Nick's role in raising the fund. As she leaves the bank Sam catches her and takes away the check despite Nick's pleadings. As the ceremony is filmed live by Molly, one of Nick's friends from her past recognizes her. Title reference: The Charity Mugger
8	"The Block Out"	Bob Koherr	Johanna Stokes	April 15, 2019
Nick's old friend Riley comes to her school looking for her. Ed and Liz are also called to her school as she is doing badly in many of her assignments. Nick skips class and goes with Riley to catch up. Jeremy follows them also cutting school. When Ed and Liz find that Nick is not in school they get worried. They ask Molly but she herself is waiting for her volunteer squad meeting. They call Jeremy and find out where she is. They bring Nick and Riley back to the house to play games. Nick tells Riley that she has told the Thompsons her last name is Patterson and that her parents died in a car crash and asks her to keep the truth a secret. The family tries to glean information about Nick from Riley. Sensing danger, she tells Riley to leave and blocks her out. Seeing Nick crying and not feeling at home makes Ed and Liz call an expert family therapist so they can get to know the real Nick. Title reference: Nick blocks Riley out like blocking on social media.
9	"The Man in the Middle Attack"	Phill Lewis	Erika Kaestle & Patrick McCarthy	April 15, 2019
Ingrid, a therapist from social services comes to the house. Nick calls Sam and tells him about the therapist. He tells her not to worry as her file has been fixed and in case of a problem she is to text him 911. The therapist breaks them in groups to see how they interact. She makes Molly and Nick do fun buddy exercises. As Jeremy clearly does not trust Nick, they do trust building exercise. Nick gives a rosy picture of Liz and Ed. Ingrid feels that whole show was staged. Nick wriggles out of the situation by using Man-in-the-middle attack techniques. Jeremy says that Nick has just told them what they want to hear and that they know her no better still. Ingrid announces that it is Jeremy who needs therapy. Jeremy walks out and Molly follows him to talk. In Molly's room they open the vent as it is very hot and there they find Nick's secret phone. Jeremy accuses her of being a liar and she punches him in the face, making him realize the effects of his actions. Title reference: Man-in-the-middle attack
10	"The Jam Auction"	Phill Lewis	David H. Steinberg & Keetgi Kogan	April 15, 2019
Nick's dad tells her that the lawyer is asking for $10,000 by the end of the next day to keep the case. The Thompsons inform Nick that they have four tickets to Hamilton for which they will leave by noon. Nick says that she will go to library with a study group. Nick plans a scam by listing items of furniture in the house for an estate sale. Jeremy receives an envelope from Oregon state department of record from his request. He throws it unopened in the trash can. The Thompsons want to organize a surprise birthday party for Nick so Jeremy takes Nick to the park to talk. Nick cancels estate sale and calls the lawyer. She learns from his assistant that they are not demanding money. The Thompson family showers Nick with thoughtful gifts to make her feel at home. They have a party for her and Nick describes it as her 'perfect day'. Nick learns from her dad that there was no lawyer and he might never come home. A dejected Nick finally unpacks and accepts the Thompson family home as her home. Liz finds the envelope in the trash and opens it to settle Jeremy's trust issues. The details on the records match Nick's but the picture of the girl is different. The first part of the series ends with Liz asking herself "If this is Nicole, then who the hell is living with us?" Title reference: Jam Auction
Part 2
11	"The Bankjob"	Eric Dean Seaton	Eric Goldberg & Peter Tibbals	August 5, 2019
Nick confronts her father about him lying to her and finds out that he owes $100,000 to the Mob with the man who he thought was the lawyer in question was working for the Mob. Ed brings Nick and Molly to the bank for Take Our Daughters and Sons to Work Day. Jeremy pressures Liz into finding out more about the file, which causes Liz to confront Nick. Nick is able to convince Liz to call Dorothy to find out the truth. Nick asks a lot of questions during the tour of the bank including questions about its security. Liz calls Dorothy to find out the truth and Dorothy tries to explain that it is because of a mix-up, but Jeremy persists and persuades Liz to ask questions at the social services office. Meanwhile, Nick finds a moment alone with Ms. Lewis (the bank manager) where she tries to find out her personal information. With the information, Nick tries to make a transfer but she is interrupted by Ed who wants to show her the safe deposit room. There Nick sees Ms Chang with a 150 000 Dollar necklace. At the social services office, Dorothy gets help from Cheryl to clear up all the confusion about Nicks file. At the Bank, Nick manages to get an internship and Ed is very proud of her which causes Molly to be jealous. Lastly, Dorothy grows suspicious with the information she gained from Liz at social services convincing her that they need to keep an eye on Nick.
12	"The Big Mitt"	Erika Kaestle	Emily Schmidt	August 5, 2019
A handsome new student named Will joins the volunteer squad. Ed surprises Liz with the job of catering the poker tournament thinking that it is the perfect business opportunity. Nick partners with the handsome new students to stack the deck at a charity poker tournament and they start to grow closer. Ed is concerned when no one likes Liz's food, so he helps her fix the recipes. The Volunteer Squad questions Molly's leadership. Nick uses Todd to cheat in the raffle competition and she wins the 7 000 dollar ATV. They leave Molly alone and Molly is really upset. Nick and Will almost kiss but then she sees Jeremy kissing Eric. Nick promises Jeremy not to tell anyone about him being gay. Will calls Dorothy and Sam Harbaugh and keeps them up to date on what has happened with Nick since he has arrived.
13	"The Trojan Horse"	Robbie Countryman	Teddy Steinkellner	August 5, 2019
Nick tricks Ed into taking away all of the phones from the kids in school for the '90s-themed day at the school. Nick talks with Will and figures out that Will knows the Harbaughs. The '90s-themed day at the school brings Liz face to face with her former rival Cheri. Nick uses a trojan horse to sneak past Jeremy, who is guarding all of the confiscated phones. While stealing the phones Nick is caught by Will who is hiding in the vents. They then decide to team up. Nick sends the Harbaughs a message by using a fake security guard to catch Will with the phones. Liz and her former rival make up which helps Molly try to bury the hatchet with Becky. Will gets a call from the Harbaughs and insists that he still wants to tail Nick.
14	"Follow The Lady"	Robbie Countryman	David Tolentino	August 5, 2019
Molly grows suspicious of Nick when it is discovered that Will stole the phones. Nick sets her sight on scamming Ed's wealthiest banking client. To convince Ms Chang to switch all of her accounts to Jeremy's bans he wines and dines her at Crescendo. But an increasingly suspicious Molly is watching Nick's, trying to get her fingerprints while Jeremy tries to prevent Molly from getting them. Molly is finally able to get Nick's fingerprints. Nick finds out that Liz wants to open a new restaurant at the location of Nick's father's old restaurant Franzelli's.
15	"The Italian Job"	Phill Lewis	David H. Steinberg & Keetgi Kogan	August 5, 2019
A flashback episode reveals the origins of Nick's revenge plot against the Thompsons. To help Liz's new restaurant (Crescendo) take off, the Thompsons all had a part in making Franzelli's go bankrupt: Liz copied Franzelli's menu and undercut their prices. Ed refused Nick's father's plea of extending the loan at his bank for the restaurant, even though he had been a perfect client. Molly asked her friends for help and wrote bad reviews of the restaurant on Yelp. Jeremy stole the flyers of Nick's last chance of getting the customers back to Franzelli's. Nick's desperate father took a loan from the mob and did a series of heists to pay back the loan. This led to the arrest of Nick's father. They see the Thompsons and rant about how they did everything to put them out of business. As Tony is taken away, Nick is approached by a child service worker who puts her with the Harbaughs. In the present, Liz states that they now have two properties which bothers Nick.
16	"The Mystery Shopper"	Jody Margolin Hahn	Stefanie Leder	August 5, 2019
Nick is reluctant on taking down the Thompsons because she doesn't want to hurt Molly. Molly decides that she will give Nick a personality test to see if she is trustworthy. Nick concocts a plan to teach Molly a much-needed lesson about how what she did to Franzelli's is wrong, which leads to Molly losing all of her Twitter followers. Ed and Jeremy cook up a challenge to help Liz ace her Top Chef interview, during which Liz goes through multiple personalities. Molly still hasn't learnt her lesson so Nick releases the security video of Molly badmouthing her friends, causing them to disband and Molly breaking off her friendship with Nick. Liz aces her Top Chef interview.
17	"The Pied Piper"	Eric Dean Seaton	Johanna Stokes	August 5, 2019
When Top Chef sends a camera crew to Crescendo, Nick unleashes a plan involving rats to try to prevent Liz from being able to get the Franzelli's building and she uses a Franzelli's regular to do it. She has a brief change of heart after Liz mentions she considers her family and able to run the restaurant eventually, but when Liz brags about running Franzelli’s out of business, Nick proceeds with the plan. Meanwhile, Molly tries to replace the friends she lost with another activist group, but they quickly abandon her after she starts trying to take control of the group. Ed tries to cheer up Molly, which leads to Molly realizing that she is the one that screwed up. Nick succeeds in ruining Liz's reputation and Liz is now known as "Rat Lady". Nick finds out that the person who stole the Franzelli's flyers was Jeremy.
18	"The Diploma Mill"	Jody Margolin Hahn	Eric Goldberg & Peter Tibbals	August 5, 2019
To get revenge, Nick tries to sabotage Jeremy's presidency by framing him for cheating on tests and during the election. Meanwhile, Eric and Jeremy move forward with their relationship, but struggle with deciding how to come out to the Thompsons. Will continues to spy on Nick, but when he gets caught by the mob Nick lies to protect him. Back at the restaurant, Liz and Molly sift through the evidence to try and figure out who set Crescendo’s up, but quickly abandon the search after ruling Franzelli’s out, realizing that they are going through what they put Franzelli’s through. Jeremy confronts Nick about setting him up and getting him expelled. Nick starts to fall apart and tries to go to her father for help and her father tries to manipulate Nick into hurting Ed as well. Torn, Nick goes to see Will, who gives Nick a one-way bus ticket and a fake ID, before kissing her goodbye.
19	"The Box Job"	Eric Dean Seaton	Erika Kaestle & Patrick McCarthy	August 5, 2019
Nick moves forward with the bank heist so she can finally pay off her father's debts. Jeremy plans a special evening, where he wants to come out to his family and wants it to be perfect. Molly helps Liz who is trying to buy a car for Jeremy to cheer him up. Jeremy's plan of how he wants to come out doesn't go according to plan when Molly and Liz try to surprise him with the car and find out early, but they accept him nonetheless. Meanwhile, Nick succeeds in the bank heist and retrieves Ms. Chang’s necklace, only to return home and discover Liz and Ed want to officially adopt her, causing her to regret her actions. The test results for Nick’s fingerprints finally arrive, allowing Molly and Jeremy to discover Nick’s true identity. As they reveal this to Liz and Ed, the police arrive and arrest Ed for the bank heist.
20	"The Fool's Errand"	Phill Lewis	David H. Steinberg & Keetgi Kogan	August 5, 2019
With nowhere to run, a cornered Nick confronts the Thompsons and comes clean about her past and vendetta, and the family leave her in the hands of the police. The Harbaughs get Nick out of police custody and confront Nick about everything that she has done. The Harbaughs try to blackmail Nick into giving them the necklace. Meanwhile, the Thompsons struggle to come to terms with Nick’s betrayal, but before they can decide on whether or not to forgive her, Nick arrives, now following through with the Harbaughs plan and knocks them out. She opens the door allowing the Harbaughs to enter. In a last-minute twist, it turns out that the Thompsons aren't really asleep and the police arrest the Harbaughs, revealing that it was all a set up. Full of guilt and fear that the Thompsons can't forgive her, Nick runs away leaving them a note stating that she has undone some damages to them, such as mending Molly's friendships and receding Jeremy's expulsion. Will catches up with Nick and gives her a picture he found of her mother with the Harbaughs. Lastly, the Thompsons arrive to take Nick back while giving her their forgiveness.

== Production ==
On September 21, 2018, it was announced that Netflix had given the production a series order for a first season consisting of twenty episodes. The series was created by David H. Steinberg and Keetgi Kogan, both of whom were also expected to executive produce. It was further announced that Andy Fickman would serve as the series' director. On March 6, 2019, Netflix announced that the series is set to release the first 10 episodes on April 15, 2019, and a promotional poster was released.

Alongside the series order announcement, it was confirmed that Melissa Joan Hart, Sean Astin, Siena Agudong, Kalama Epstein, and Lauren Lindsey Donzis had been cast in starring roles.

Principal photography for the series had reportedly already begun by September 2018.

On September 15, 2019, it was announced that the series was canceled after one season.

== Reception ==
On review aggregator Rotten Tomatoes, the series holds an approval rating of 60% based on 5 reviews, with an average rating of 6.5/10. A critic from the Hollywood Gossip writes: "There are plenty of ways that No Good Nick could have made more of its premise, but it never really stumbles on a compelling one."
