= Conchitina Cruz =

Filipina poet

- Born: June 15, 1975 (age 51); City of Manila, Philippines
- Occupations: Poet, author
- Years active: 2005–present day
- Notable work: Dark Hours, Elsewhere Held and Lingered, Disappear
- Awards: National Book Award for Poetry 2006

Conchitina "Chingbee" T. Cruz is a Filipina poet who teaches creative writer and comparative literature at the University of the Philippines Diliman in Quezon City.

== Biography ==
Formerly an INTARMED student, Cruz shifted to the University of the Philippines Creative Writing program, from which she graduated magna cum laude and College of Arts and Letters valedictorian in 1998.

While on a Fulbright grant, she studied and taught at the University of Pittsburgh, Pennsylvania, where she received her MFA in Writing. She obtained her PhD in English from SUNY Albany.

Her works include Disappear, a chapbook published in 2005 by High Chair, Dark Hours, published in 2005 by The University of the Philippines Press, elsewhere held and lingered, published in 2008 by High Chair, A catalogue of clothes for sale from the closet of Christine Abella: perpetual student, ukay fan, and compulsive traveler, published in 2012 by the Youth & Beauty Brigade, and There is no emergency, published in 2015 by the Youth & Beauty Brigade. She is also the youngest poet in the anthology A Habit of Shores, the third part in Gémino H. Abad's three-volume collection of one hundred years of Philippine poetry and verse.

Some of her works have also appeared in Mid-American Review, Indiana Review, Philippine Studies and the online journal High Chair. In September 2006, Dark Hours was reviewed by Andy Brown, the creative writing program director at the University of Exeter.

== Awards ==
Cruz has won two Palanca Awards to date, one in 1996 for "Second Skin" and another in 2001 for "The Shortest Distance". Her book Dark Hours won the 2006 National Book Award for Poetry.
