= Siena Agudong =

American actress (born 2004)

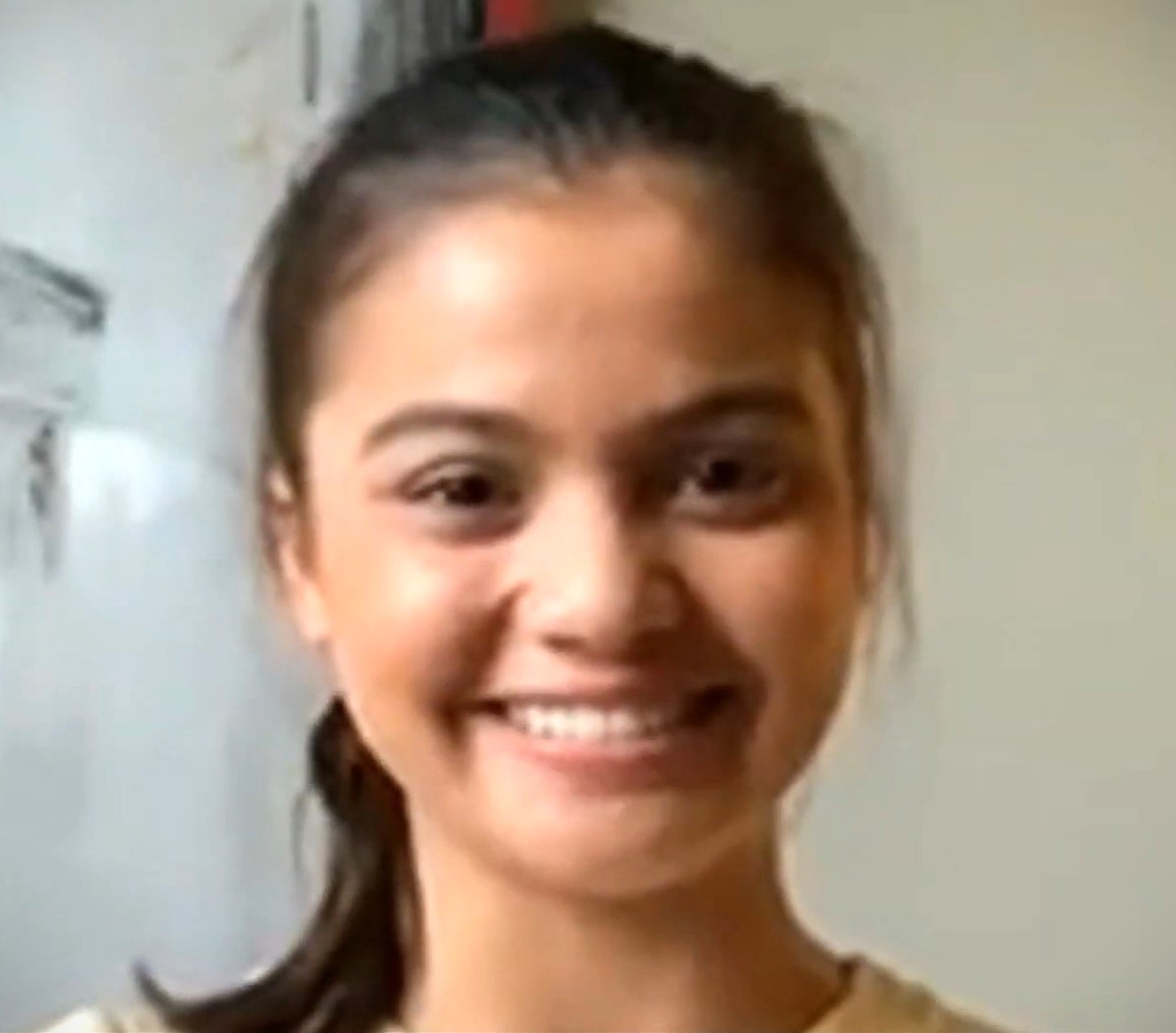
- Agudong in 2019
- Born: Siena Nicole Agudong; August 19, 2004 (age 22); Kauai, Hawaii, U.S.
- Occupation: Actress
- Years active: 2013–present
- Relatives: Sydney Agudong (sister)

Siena Nicole Agudong (born August 19, 2004) is an American actress. On television, she is known for her roles in the Nickelodeon series Star Falls (2018), and the main role in the Netflix series No Good Nick (2019), Resident Evil (2022), and Carrie (2026). Her films include Alex & Me (2018), Upside-Down Magic (2020), Kevin Smith's The 4:30 Movie (2024), and Sidelined: The QB and Me (2024).

== Early life and education ==
Siena Nicole Agudong was born in Kauai, Hawaii. She is of Caucasian and Filipino descent. Her older sister, Sydney, who would later portray Nani Pelekai in the live-action Lilo & Stitch, inspired her to act.

Agudong attended King Kaumuali‘i Elementary School and Island School. She then switched to online school during her acting career.

== Career ==
Agudong started acting when she was 7 in local productions, her first role being in Willy Wonka at the Hawaii Children's Theatre. She made her television debut at the age of 8 with a recurring role as Lulu Parker in Killer Women. She played the recurring role of Natlee on Nicky, Ricky, Dicky & Dawn and has had guest roles in Teachers and Sydney to the Max.

Agudong's work earned her several Young Artist Award and Young Entertainer Award nominations since 2015 and a win for Best Guest Starring Young Actress – 12 & Under in 2017.

Agudong starred in 2018 Warner Bros. direct-to-video film Alex & Me as Reagan Wills. In 2018, Agudong also was cast as the lead, Sophia Miller, in the Nickelodeon series Star Falls. In September 2018, it was announced she would play the titular role of a young con-artist in 2019 Netflix sitcom, No Good Nick. In August 2019 it was announced that Agudong had been cast in the co-starring role of Reina Carvajal in the Disney Channel Original Movie, Upside-Down Magic, which premiered on July 31, 2020. The latter film was officially Agudong's first lead role in a film. Siena later portrayed a younger Mia Toretto in F9.

== Personal life ==
Siena Agudong holds a PADI Scuba certification, which she earned through Reef Pirates.

== Filmography ==
=== Film ===
Year	Title	Role	Notes
2013	Second Chances	Mindy	
2018	Alex & Me	Reagan Wills	
2021	F9	Mia Toretto (young)	
2021	Let Us In	Scarlett	
2024	The 4:30 Movie	Melody Barnegat	
2024	Sidelined: The QB and Me	Dallas Bryan	Tubi Original Movie
2025	Sidelined 2: Intercepted	Dallas Bryan	Tubi Original Movie
2026	Buzzkill	Nora	Also executive producer; Tubi Original Movie
2027	Extraction 3		Netflix Original Movie

=== Television ===
Year	Title	Role	Notes
2014	Killer Women	Lulu Parker	Recurring role
2015–2018	Nicky, Ricky, Dicky & Dawn	Natlee	Recurring role (seasons 2–4)
2016–2019	Teachers	Tiffany	3 episodes
2018	Star Falls	Sophia Miller	Main role
2019	Sydney to the Max	Brittany	Episode: "You've Got Female"
2019	No Good Nick	Nicole "Nick" Franzelli	Lead role
2020	Hawaii Five-0	Olivia	Episode: "E ho'i na keiki oki uaua o na pali"
2020	Upside-Down Magic	Reina Carvajal	Television film (Disney Channel Original Movie)
2020	Raven's Home	Mikka	Episode: "Tesscue Me"
2022	Resident Evil	Billie Wesker	Main role
2024	Transformers: EarthSpark	Izzy / Quintesson Shapeshifter	Voice role; 6 episodes
2026	Carrie	Susan "Sue" Snell	Main role

== Awards and nominations ==
Year	Award	Category	Work	Result	Refs
2015	Young Artist Awards	Best Performance in a TV Series – Recurring Young Actress 10 and Under	Killer Women	Nominated	
2016	Young Artist Awards	Best Performance in a TV Series – Guest Starring Young Actress 10 and Under	Nicky, Ricky, Dicky & Dawn	Nominated	
2017	Young Artist Awards	Best Performance in a TV Series – Recurring Young Actress	Nicky, Ricky, Dicky & Dawn	Nominated	
