= Rocko's Diner =

Restaurant in Mission, British Columbia, Canada

- Interactive map of Rocko's Diner

Restaurant information
- Established: July 11, 1956
- Owner: Schiller Family
- Previous owner: Nick Nicholson
- Food type: diner
- Location: 32786 Lougheed Highway, Mission, British Columbia, Canada
- Coordinates: 49.13276°N 122.31681°W
- Website: rockosdiner.com

Rocko's Diner is a diner located in Mission, British Columbia, best known for its forty flavours of milkshakes and its use as a filming location for several televisions shows. The diner was the first drive-in and first 24-hour restaurant in Mission. In 2017, USA Today named the diner one of Canada's top ten filming locations.

== History ==
On July 11, 1956, under ownership of Nick Nicholson, the diner opened as Nick's Diner and then was named Hi-Lite Burger Bar. It was Mission's first highway drive-in. To celebrate the opening, Nicholson hosted an open-air dance on the driveway of the restaurant. The Schiller family acquired the Hi-Lite Burger Bar in the early 1980s and renamed it Rocko's Diner in 1986.

== In popular culture ==
Because the Schiller family owns both the land and the diner, the restaurant is an attractive filming location for production companies. Rocko's Diner has been a filming location for several films and television shows, including various Hallmark movies, Percy Jackson and the Lightning Thief, Killer Among Us, and Horns.

The diner is the site for the pilot scenes of Pop's Chock'lit Shoppe in Riverdale. The set used for later scenes in the series was modeled after Rocko's. After the Riverdale scenes were filmed at the diner, fans of the show began visiting the diner. Rocko's named milkshakes after the characters of Archie, Veronica, and Betty, and created a burger called the Jughead Burger. Following Luke Perry's death, the diner created a milkshake to honour him and his acting career.
