= Prerna Gupta =

American businesswoman

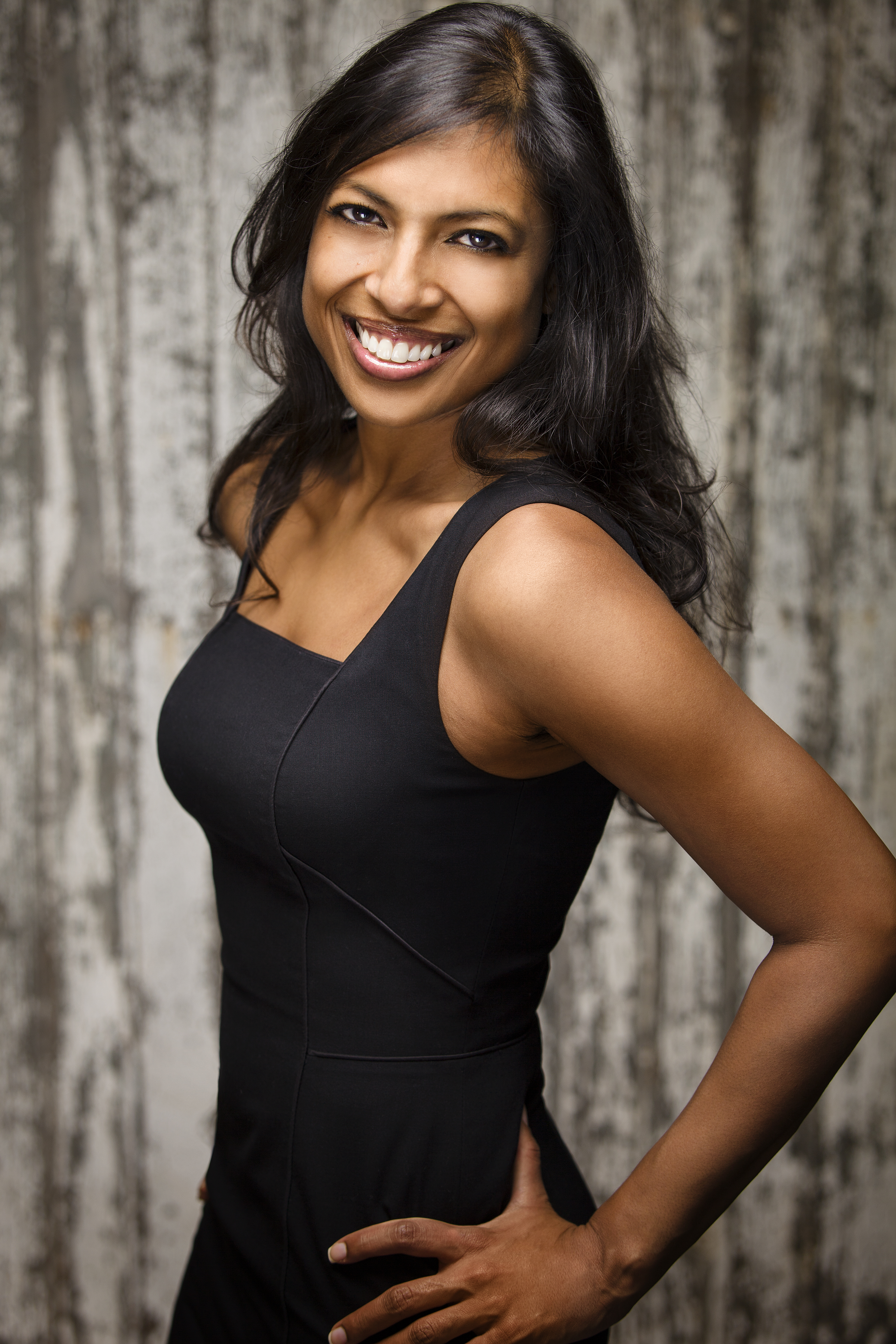
- Born: 1981 or 1982 (age 43–44); Shawnee, Oklahoma, United States
- Education: Stanford
- Occupation: Businesswoman
- Spouse: Parag Chordia
- Website: prernagupta.com

Prerna Gupta is an American businesswoman. She currently is the CEO of Telepathic Inc., which developed the smartphone app Hooked. She cofounded several startups focusing on music, dating, and short-stories. In 2011, she was named one of the most influential women in technology by the Fast Company magazine.

== Early life and education ==
Prerna Gupta was born c. 1981/1982 to Dr. Sudhir and Shikha Gupta, in Shawnee, Oklahoma. Her parents were Indian-American immigrants.

In 1999, Gupta won the title of Miss Asia Oklahoma at a beauty pageant. She also was mistress of ceremonies at Brad Henry's inauguration, the governor of Oklahoma in 2003; she had met his wife, Kim Henry, in one of her high school history classes. Gupta graduated with a degree in economics from Stanford University in 2004, earning the Phi Beta Kappa honor. While at Stanford, Gupta joined Kappa Alpha Theta.

== Career ==
Gupta's first job out of college was at the Monitor Group in San Francisco, a strategy consulting practice. In 2006, she and her husband moved to Atlanta, Georgia and created a dating site for young Indians called Yaari. Gupta grew the site to two million users before moving to her second venture.

In 2009, the couples started an app company called Khush which developed an iPhone app called LaDiDa creating background music to a user's singing. It became one of the most downloaded free music apps. The company also developed the app Songify. Khush was acquired by Smule in December 2011. After the acquisition, Gupta became the Chief Product Officer at Smule, staying there until 2013. She also became involved in angel investing.

After leaving Smule, Gupta went on a road trip and started writing a book, a fiction piece that took place in a futuristic Silicon Valley. Abandoning the book, she and her husband created Telepathic Inc. and an app called Hooked where users share 1,000-word pieces of fiction. By 2017, Hooked was one of the most popular apps on the iTunes store. In 2018, the company released its first feature-length story.

== Personal life ==
Gupta married to her husband Parag Chordia on March 16, 2009. She lives in San Francisco, California.
