= Allen Lau =

Hong Kong-born Canadian entrepreneur

Allen Lau is a Hong Kong-born Canadian entrepreneur who is the co-founder and former CEO of Wattpad.

== Biography ==
Lau was born in Hong Kong, and at age 19, he emigrated to Canada, where he attended the University of Toronto. There, he earned his bachelor's degree in electrical engineering in 1991, followed by a master's in electrical engineering in 1992.

After graduating, Lau got a job as a software developer at IBM, but did not like working at such a big company. In 1993, he moved on to Toronto-based software start-up Delrina. A few years later, he joined Brightspark, a Toronto-based venture capital incubator founded by the same entrepreneurs who started Delrina. It was at Brightspark that Lau started his first company, Tira Wireless, which published games for mobile phones. Lau says that that was where he got the idea for Wattpad. Wattpad, which Lau founded in 2006, is an online platform that allows writers to share their writing with the online Wattpad community.

Lau is a prominent member of the Canadian entrepreneurship community; in 2014, he and his wife, Eva Lau, founded Two Fish Ventures, a venture firm that invests in internet-based startups in the Toronto and Kitchener-Waterloo regions.

In 2021, Wattpad announced that it was being acquired by South Korean conglomerate Naver, for US$600 million; Wattpad is planning to continue running independently with Lau maintaining his leadership position.
