= Wattpad =

Online community themed around reading and writing

Wattpad.com
- Current, rebranded logo since 2019
- Company type: Subsidiary
- Website type: Reading app, social networking service
- Available in: Multilingual; stories available in more than in 50 languages
- Headquarters: Toronto, Ontario, Canada
- Area served: Worldwide (except blocking countries)
- Owners: Webtoon Entertainment (Naver Corporation and LY Corporation)
- Founders: Allen Lau; Ivan Yuen
- President: David Lee
- Employees: 145
- Website: wattpad.com
- Registration: Required for nearly all actions.
- Users: 500 million (2020)
- Launched: December 2006; 19 years ago
- Current status: Active
- Native clients on: Web, Android, iOS

Wattpad is a website for reading and publishing original fiction and connecting with fellow writers and readers. Its most popular genres are romance, teen fiction, and fan fiction. As of September 2023, Wattpad has a global audience of more than 90 million users, the majority of whom are younger women. There are over 665 million story uploads in total.

Some stories originally published on Wattpad have been adapted into mainstream novels, TV series, and films, including After and The Kissing Booth series. In January 2019, Wattpad launched its own publishing division, Wattpad Books, to simplify publishing for authors. In January 2021, Naver Corporation announced that it would acquire Wattpad, and the deal was completed in May 2021.

== History ==
Wattpad was developed in 2006 as the result of a collaboration between Allen Lau and Ivan Yuen. The company is based in Toronto, Ontario. In 2011, Wattpad announced that it received $3.5M in total funding from its current investors, and from W Media Ventures, Golden Venture Partners, and Union Square Ventures. In June 2012, Wattpad raised $17.3M from a group of venture funds led by Khosla Ventures. In April 2014, they announced a $46M of Series C funding led by OMERS. In January 2018, Wattpad announced $51M in funding from Tencent Holdings Limited, BDC, Globe Telecom's Kickstart Ventures, Peterson Group, Canso, and existing investor Raine. As of January 2018, Wattpad had received about $117.8M in funding from investors.

Wattpad logo (2006–2018)

In December 2011, Wattpad was selected as the hottest digital media company in the country at the Canadian Innovation Exchange.

=== Acquisition by Naver ===
In January 2021, Wattpad announced that it would be acquired by South Korean conglomerate Naver Corporation in a $600 million cash-and-stock deal. Wattpad remained headquartered in Canada and under its current leadership.

== Platform Overview ==
According to a June 2009 Wattpad press release, the application had been downloaded over 5 million times. In March 2009, an iPhone version was released. This was followed by the launch on BlackBerry App World in April 2009, on Android in June 2009, and on Apple in April 2010. In December 2015, a Windows version was also released.

=== Sister apps ===
In February 2015, Wattpad launched the standalone app After Dark. The app focuses on the romance genre and is intended for adult readers.

In February 2017, Wattpad launched a chat stories app called Tap, which has stories in the form of text messages as if reading a private conversation on someone else's phone. In the first few weeks after the launch, the company reported that 25,000 user-generated stories had been made. On July 28, 2017, Tap launched Tap Originals, a series of original stories with chapters released on a weekly basis.

=== Paid stories ===
In October 2018, Wattpad began Wattpad Next as a beta test. Wattpad Next featured stories that were to be paid for with coins, from which writers could earn money. The beta test concluded in April 2019, with Wattpad concluding that "Wattpadders are ready for a program that funds writers". The program, relaunched as Paid Stories, was initially available in the United States, Great Britain, Canada, Australia, New Zealand, Ireland, Mexico, and the Philippines. In May, it was expanded to Latin America and Spain, and in July it became worldwide with stories available in English and Spanish.

=== Wattpad Books ===
On January 24, 2019, Wattpad launched the publishing division Wattpad Books led by Wattpad Studios' Publishing Deputy Manager Ashleigh Gardner, with operations managed by Wattpad Studios' Publishing Director Deanna McFadden. According to CEO Allen Lau, this project was in an effort to take the "guesswork" out of publishing.

The Wattpad Books acquisitions team uses a mix of machine learning algorithms and human editors. The acquisitions team looks to Wattpad's large and existing digital library (over half a billion titles) in order to select notable material for publication. According to Wattpad Books leader Ashleigh Gardner, this is in an effort to combat bias inherent in human editors. Gardner says that this technology analyses the data behind each title, looking at story structure and word use in addition to levels of reader engagement per title. This data is then compared to analyses of other books on Wattpad and in the public domain. Once all the data has been collected and engagement has been looked at, human staffers read the titles and create their lists.

All published titles are a combination of international hits and notable but known material from their digital library. These titles are distributed by Macmillan, Raincoast Books, and Penguin Random House in India and the United Kingdom, with their Fall 2019 list available in leading North American retailers. Outside North America, Gardner has sold the rights to Hachette (France) for Deanna Cameron's What Happened Last Night. Additionally, Lauren Palphreyman's rights to Cupid's Match have been sold in French (Hachette) and German (S. Fischer Verlag).

Wattpad's first list consisted of six young adult novels. The QB Bad Boy & Me by Tay Marley (28.8 million reads) will be their lead title and was slated for release on August 13, 2019. The remaining five books will be released between September and October 2019 and include: Trapeze by Leigh Ansell (2.5 million reads), What Happened That Night by Deanna Cameron (over 1 million reads), Saving Everest by Sky Reads (17.2 million reads), Cupid's Match by Lauren Palphreyman (46.4 million reads), and I'm a Gay Wizard by V.S. Santoni (404,000 reads). Wattpad hopes to publish 18 titles in their 2020 list.

Besides Wattpad Books, Wattpad announced a partnership with Anvil Publishing, Inc., one of the Philippines' leading publishers, to create Bliss Books, a YA imprint with Filipino young adults and romance fanatics as their target market. In February 2007, Wattpad announced the addition of over 17,000 e-books from Project Gutenberg, making them available to mobile users.

=== Statistics ===
As of September 2020:

- More than 80% of its traffic and usage comes from mobile devices
- The site has 90 million monthly users
- There were over 665 million story uploads in total
- 70% of users are female, 80% of whom are millennials or Gen Z

As of 2018, nearly 300,000 writers from 35 countries took part in Wattpad's yearly writing competition, The Watty Awards.

== Platform usage ==
=== Publishing ===
Famous authors such as Margaret Atwood and R. L. Stine have also joined Wattpad. Atwood has posted poetry and judged a poetry contest on the platform. Stine has used Wattpad to post chapters of his books and has done interactive events with readers.

Wattpad has formed ties with publishing houses to try to help Wattpad authors receive compensation for their works. A new branch, Wattpad Studios, was developed to connect popular writers to both the publishing and film industries. Wattpad has, in the past, teamed up with publishing groups such as Sourcebooks to help Wattpad authors receive book deals and get their work into hard copies. More traditional publishing houses such as Random House and HarperCollins have approached popular Wattpad writers to negotiate publishing deals, allowing the website to serve as a springboard into the more traditional publishing industry.

Author Anna Todd, whose work After has received over a billion reads on the site, was given a publishing deal with Simon & Schuster to turn her online work into a multiple-book published saga. A film version starring Josephine Langford, Hero Fiennes Tiffin, Selma Blair, Jennifer Beals, Peter Gallagher, and Shane Paul McGhie was released by Aviron Pictures on April 12, 2019.

=== Fan fiction ===
Wattpad has increased in popularity among many fandoms, who take to the platform to craft their own fan fiction. One of the most notable stories on the platform is the After series by Anna Todd, which was originally published as Harry Styles fan fiction. After its large popularity amongst the One Direction fandom and the app's readers, the story became the most-read book on Wattpad, having achieved just under 10 million unique readers on the platform and has been read more than one billion times. The series went on to be published by Gallery Books and became a New York Times Best Seller.

By crafting a spot for fanfiction alongside its other genres, Wattpad prioritizes its teen readers and gives the platform a twist. Deputy General Manager, Ashleigh Gardner, added the following about the genre: "What's unique about Wattpad is that fanfic is treated like any other genre, living alongside other forms of fiction. This makes it more fluid for readers of original fiction to discover a new fanfic, or inspire a fanfiction writer to start a new story and bring their audience along with them."

Fan fiction is the third-largest category on Wattpad, closely behind Romance and Teen Fiction, many of which are also fan fiction.

=== Contests ===
Wattpad hosts a number of writing contests each year, including the annual Watty Awards, the largest writing competition in the world. In 2011, The Watty Awards introduced three entry levels (Popular, On The Rise, and Undiscovered) to allow greater chances of winning for every type of writer. Contests are open to anyone who has a Wattpad account.

During the summer of 2012, Wattpad in collaboration with Margaret Atwood, Canadian poet/novelist/literary critic, held the "Wattys": the first major poetry contest offering a chance to poets on Wattpad to compete against each other in one of two categories, either as an "Enthusiast" or a "Competitor". It has been going on ever since, and now the contest is open to books of all genres.

=== Entertainment ===
Several stories published on Wattpad have been adapted to film and television, most of which are produced under Wattpad's in-house production company, Wattpad Webtoon Studios (formerly Wattpad Studios). In July 2025, the company rebranded as Webtoon Productions, taking the name of its sister platform Webtoon.

The first Wattpad-to-screen adaptation was the 2014 Philippine film Diary ng Panget, which is based on the novel of the same name published on the platform by Denny R. (under the pseudonym HaveYouSeenThisGirL). In March 2014, Wattpad partnered with Pop Fiction, an imprint of the Philippine publishing company Summit Media, to market stories by its writers in the Philippines. Since then, some Wattpad stories have also been adapted into Philippine television dramas or teleseryes. Philippine television network TV5, in partnership with Wattpad and Life is Beautiful Publishing Company, launched Wattpad Presents, an anthology series of TV dramas based on Wattpad stories from Filipino authors, most of which were published locally by LIB Publishing.

The first Hollywood adaptation of a Wattpad story was the 2018 Netflix film The Kissing Booth, which was based on the novel of the same name by Beth Reekles that originated as a story on the platform, where it won a Watty Award for "Most Popular Teen Fiction" in Wattpad's annual writing contest. It premiered on May 11, 2018, and was hailed as "one of the most-watched movies in the country, and maybe in the world" by co-CEO of Netflix, Ted Sarandos. The Kissing Booth was the fourth most popular movie in IMDb's popularity rankings in June 2018.

Wattpad has also signed deals with Asian distribution partners, including the pan-Asian streaming platform Iflix to co-produce dozens of original movies based on Wattpad stories from Indonesian authors, as well as the Singaporean public broadcaster Mediacorp to bring Wattpad stories to the broadcaster's free-to-air channels such as Channel 5 (with exception of CNA) and its streaming service mewatch (formerly Toggle).

On December 8, 2021, it was announced that ViacomCBS would be partnering with Wattpad to produce some of its original stories. The first series produced under this partnership was the Hulu television series Light as a Feather, based on the book Light as a Feather, Stiff as a Board by Zoe Aarsen and produced by ViacomCBS-owned company AwesomenessTV, which received ten Daytime Emmy Award nominations.

==== Adaptations of Wattpad works ====
Table key
| † | Adaptations co-produced by Wattpad Studios/Wattpad Webtoon Studios/Webtoon Productions |

===== Film =====
| Title | Based on | Distributor | Country | Original release | Ref(s) |
|---|---|---|---|---|---|
| Diary ng Panget | Diary ng Panget by Denny R. (HaveYouSeenThisGirL) | Viva Films | Philippines | April 2, 2014 | |
| She's Dating the Gangster | She's Dating the Gangster by Bianca Bernardino (SGWannaB) | Star Cinema | Philippines | July 16, 2014 | |
| Talk Back and You're Dead | Talk Back and You're Dead by Alesana Marie | Star Cinema; Viva Films | Philippines | August 20, 2014 | |
| Just the Way You Are | The Bet by Kimberly Joy Villanueva (ilurvbooks) | Star Cinema | Philippines | June 17, 2015 | |
| Must Date the Playboy | Must Date the Playboy by Imma delos Santos (notjustarandomgirl) | iWant TV | Philippines | August 1, 2015 | |
| The Kissing Booth | The Kissing Booth by Beth Reekles | Netflix | United States | May 11, 2018 | |
| After † | After by Anna Todd (Imaginator1D) | Aviron Pictures | United States | April 12, 2019 | |
| The Kissing Booth 2 | The Kissing Booth by Beth Reekles | Netflix | United States | July 24, 2020 | |
| After We Collided † | After We Collided by Anna Todd (Imaginator1D) | Open Road Films | United States | October 23, 2020 | |
| The Kissing Booth 3 | The Kissing Booth by Beth Reekles | Netflix | United States | August 11, 2021 | |
| After We Fell † | After We Fell by Anna Todd (Imaginator1D) | Voltage Pictures | United States | September 30, 2021 | |
| Through My Window (A través de mi ventana) | Through My Window by Ariana Godoy | Netflix | Spain | February 4, 2022 | |
| After Ever Happy † | After Ever Happy by Anna Todd (Imaginator1D) | Voltage Pictures | United States | September 7, 2022 | |
| Perfect Addiction † | Perfect Addiction by Claudia Tan | Amazon Prime Video | United States | March 23, 2023 | |
| My Fault (Culpa mía) | Culpa mía by Mercedes Ron | Amazon Prime Video | Spain | June 8, 2023 | |
| Through My Window: Across the Sea (A través del mar) | Through My Window by Ariana Godoy | Netflix | Spain | June 23, 2023 | |
| After Everything † | After by Anna Todd (Imaginator1D) | Voltage Pictures | United States | September 13, 2023 | |
| Float † | Float by Kate Marchant | Elevation Pictures; Lionsgate | Canada | September 30, 2023 | |
| Through My Window 3: Looking at You (A través de tu mirada) | Through My Window by Ariana Godoy | Netflix | Spain | February 23, 2024 | |
| The Tearsmith (Fabbricante di lacrime) | The Tearsmith by Erin Doom | Netflix | Italy | April 4, 2024 | |
| Boot Camp † | Boot Camp by Gina Musa | Blue Fox Entertainment | Canada | August 2, 2024 | |
| Sidelined: The QB and Me † | The QB Bad Boy and Me by Tay Marley | Tubi | United States | November 29, 2024 | |
| Your Fault (Culpa tuya) | Culpa tuya by Mercedes Ron | Amazon Prime Video | Spain | December 27, 2024 | |
| Bad Influence (Mala influencia) | Mala influencia by Teensspirit | Tripictures | Spain | January 24, 2025 | |
| My Fault: London | Culpa mía by Mercedes Ron | Amazon Prime Video | United Kingdom | February 13, 2025 | |
| Follow My Voice (Sigue mi voz) | Sigue mi voz by Ariana Godoy | Beta Fiction Spain | Spain | September 12, 2025 | |
| Our Fault (Culpa nuestra) | Culpa nuestra by Mercedes Ron | Amazon Prime Video | Spain | October 16, 2025 | |
| Sidelined 2: Intercepted † | The QB Bad Boy and Me by Tay Marley | Tubi | United States | November 27, 2025 | |
| Kissing Is the Easy Part † | Kissing Is the Easy Part by Christine Duann (rainbowbrook) | Tubi | United States | February 13, 2026 | |
| Love Me Love Me † | Love Me Love Me by Stefania S. | Amazon Prime Video | Italy | February 13, 2026 | |
| Boulevard | Boulevard by Flor M. Salvador | Sony Pictures International Productions | Spain | April 10, 2026 | |
| Your Fault: London | Culpa tuya by Mercedes Ron | Amazon Prime Video | United Kingdom | June 2026 | |

===== Television =====
| Title | Based on | Original broadcaster | Country | Original release | Ref(s) |
|---|---|---|---|---|---|
| Wattpad Presents † | Various stories | TV5 | Philippines | September 22, 2014 – July 29, 2017 | |
| Wansapanataym: My App #Boyfie | My App Boyfie by Noreen Capili | ABS-CBN | Philippines | September 27 – October 26, 2014 | |
| Bagito | Bagito by Noreen Capili | ABS-CBN | Philippines | November 17, 2014 – March 13, 2015 | |
| Light as a Feather † | Light as a Feather, Stiff as a Board by Zoe Aarsen | Hulu | United States | October 12, 2018 – October 4, 2019 | |
| Turn On | Turn On by Tiara Wales | Vidio | Indonesia | January 14 – March 4, 2021 | |
| He's Into Her | He's Into Her by Maxine Lat Calibuso (Maxinejiji) | iWantTFC; Kapamilya Channel; A2Z | Philippines | May 28, 2021 – August 3, 2022 | |
| The Girl He Never Noticed | The Girl He Never Noticed by Neilani Alejandrino (sweetdreamer33) | Mewatch | Singapore | September 22, 2022 | |
| Luv Is † | Caught In His Arms by Ventre Canard; Love at First Read by Chixnita | GMA Network | Philippines | January 16 – July 28, 2023 | |
| The Rain In España | University Series - The Rain in España by Gwy Saludes (4reuminct) | Viva One | Philippines | May 1 – July 3, 2023 | |
| My Life with the Walter Boys | My Life with the Walter Boys by Ali Novak | Netflix | United States | December 7, 2023 – present | |
| Ang Mutya ng Section E † | Ang Mutya ng Section E by Lara Flores (Eatmore2behappy) | Viva One | Philippines | January 3, 2025 – present | |
| Seducing Drake Palma † | Seducing Drake Palma by Ariesa Jane Domingo (beeyotch) | Viva One | Philippines | June 15 – September 26, 2025 | |
| I Love You Since 1892 † | I Love You Since 1892 by Mia Alfonso | Viva One | Philippines | September 5, 2025 – January 2, 2026 | |
| Golden Scenery of Tomorrow † | Golden Scenery of Tomorrow by Gwy Saludes (4reuminct) | Viva One | Philippines | October 16, 2025 – present | |
| Hell University † | Hell University by KnightInBlack | Viva One | Philippines | February 6, 2026 – present | |
| Project Loki † | Project Loki by AkoSiIbarra | Viva One; Cignal Play | Philippines | February 21, 2026 – present | |
| Must Date the Playboy | Must Date the Playboy by Imma delos Santos (notjustarandomgirl) | Vasantham | Singapore | April 22, 2026 – present | |

== Criticisms and controversies ==
In April 2024, Wattpad announced that it would be removing a private messaging (PM) feature from the platform in response to a report on sexual grooming in PMs.

Wattpad has stated that the feature has "only been relevant to a small percentage of our user base" and removing it could foster "transparent dialogue." However, proponents of retaining private messaging have stated that private messaging allows for collaboration among other things.

=== June 2020 data breach ===
In June 2020, Wattpad suffered a huge data breach that exposed almost 270 million records. The data was initially sold before being published on a public hacking forum where it was widely circulated. The incident exposed extensive personal information including names and usernames, email and IP addresses, genders of users, birth dates, and passwords stored as bcrypt hashes.

Later that same year on July 14, researchers at Risk Based Security discovered that a threat actor from an unknown source was responsible for the breach, along with the sourcing of over 278 million password credentials and email addresses, with breakdown analysis suggesting that Gmail, Yahoo, and Outlook accounts were mostly affected. The Wattpad Corporation has since investigated and patched the issue.

=== Countries restricting access to Wattpad ===
==== China ====
Access to Wattpad from within mainland China is restricted. Censorship in China covers topics such as LGBTQ+ content, which censors consider to be immoral.

==== Russia ====
Wattpad could be restricted in Russia in response to over its refusal to delete stories depicting same-sex relationships under Russia's strict "LGBT propaganda" laws. Already, similar platforms like Archive of Our Own and Ficbook have been banned for promoting 'non-traditional sexual relations.'

==== Turkey ====
In July 2024, a Turkish court, the Ankara 10th Penal Court of Peace, ordered that access to Wattpad be blocked. As of July 18, 2024, users within Turkey have been unable to access the site without the use of a VPN. This makes Turkey the first country to officially restrict access to the site.

=== Copyright issues ===
Early in its history, some large volumes of user-uploaded material hosted on Wattpad were copyrighted material created by authors who did not grant republication rights. In May 2009, an article in The New York Times noted, "Sites like Scribd and Wattpad, which invite users to upload documents like college theses and self-published novels, have been the target of industry grumbling in recent weeks, as illegal reproductions of popular titles have turned up on them".

The Wattpad website notes, "We do not welcome upload of material that violates its copyright terms," but also states "It is simply not possible to screen and verify all posted content." In response to industry criticism, in April 2009 (before the publication of the New York Times article that named Wattpad as a vehicle for user-generated e-book infringement) Wattpad announced an "Authors In Charge" program, designed to allow authors or their representatives to identify and directly remove infringing content from the site, but this program is designed specifically for "authors with published books for sale." Authors may begin their stories on Wattpad and then choose to publish their work. In most cases, the work on Wattpad is only a sample to ensure funds go to them in regard to their writing.

== Effects on writers ==
According to a study, online writing communities like Wattpad help young writers learn and grow their craft through constructive feedback and criticism. Composed of students and their experiences on online writing platforms, the study aims to show how constructive criticism affects their writing process. Most participants prefer serious feedback over subtle critiquing, based on the results.

Wattpad, as well as similar online writing communities, help young authors build and construct their self-perception as writers, as well as establish an audience and interact with readers. It acts as a gateway into the publishing realm and offers hands-on experience with digital writing. This type of experience helps writers develop personal authorship. Claudia Tan, author of Perfect Addiction, described Wattpad as “a training ground to hone my writing skills.”

Readers on Wattpad are able to comment on specific paragraphs and lines within the texts they read. Such comments are available to be viewed by all readers and the author themselves, acting as a form of feedback for the writer.
