= Kerstin Avemo =

Swedish opera soprano (born 1973)

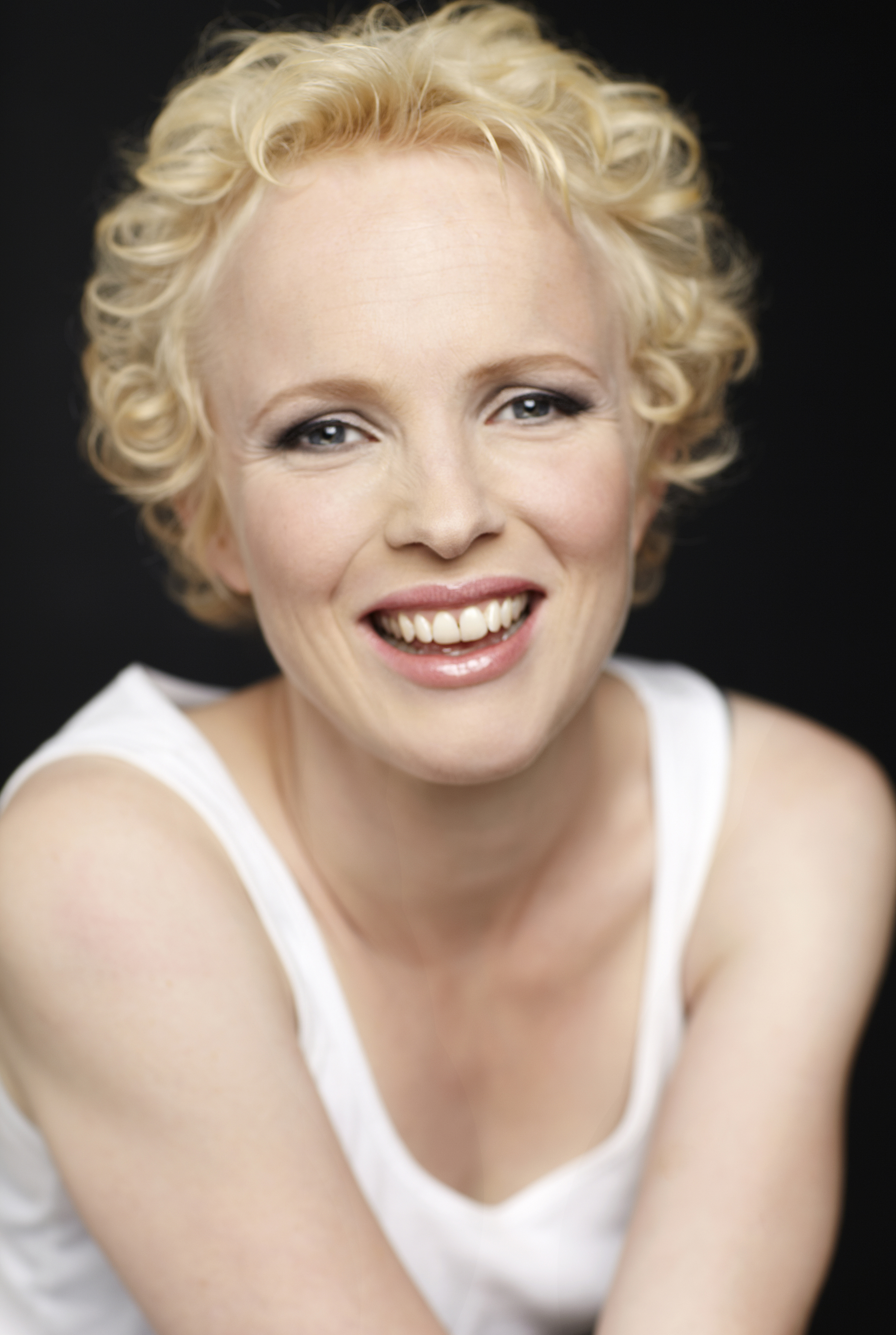

Kerstin Avemo (born 27 October 1973) is a Swedish opera singer with an active international career as a coloratura soprano.

== Early life and education ==
Born in Stockholm, Avemo attended Adolf Fredrik's Music School (Swedish: Adolf Fredriks Musikklasser), a school in Stockholm known for its song and choral curriculum. After deciding to pursue a professional singer's career she studied at the University College of Opera (Operahögskolan i Stockholm) in Stockholm.

Avemo debuted with classic tragic roles at Folkoperan in Stockholm as Violetta in La traviata, the title role in Lucia di Lammermoor and Gilda in Rigoletto, as well as in Stjärndamm (Stardust) with music by Kerstin Nerbe and commissioned by the Folkoperan. Her interpretation of the title role in Alban Berg's Lulu at the Royal Swedish Opera attracted much attention.

== Career ==
Since 2003 Avemo has worked at opera houses in Brussels, Düsseldorf, Frankfurt, Zurich, Paris (Théâtre du Châtelet), Lille, Copenhagen, Moscow, Madrid, Geneva and Strasbourg, as well as the Vienna Festival and the Aix-en-Provence Festival.

Avemo has been heard in roles such as Olympia in The Tales of Hoffmann, Oscar in Un ballo in maschera, Ofelia in Hamlet, Blondchen in Die Entführung aus dem Serail and Servilia in La clemenza di Tito. She also portrayed Kristin in Philippe Boesmans' 2005 opera Julie based on Strindberg's play Julie, and Wendla Bergmann in Benoît Mernier's setting of Frank Wedekind's play Spring Awakening, both premiered at La Monnaie in Brussels.

In 2010 to 2012 Avemo starred in Toshio Hosokawa's Hanjo directed by Calixto Bieito at the Ruhrtriennale arts festival, Zerlina in Don Giovanni at the Bolshoi Theater in Moscow, Sophie in Der Rosenkavalier in Otto Schenk's production in Geneva, Gilda in Rigoletto and Violetta in La traviata in Weimar, the title role in Lucia di Lammermoor at the Gothenburg Opera and Adèle in Die Fledermaus at the Royal Swedish Opera.

In the spring of 2013 Avemo sang Despina in Mozart's Così fan tutte in a production of Michael Haneke at the Teatro Real in Madrid. In the summer of 2013, she appeared in the show Schwanengesang D744 with music by Schubert, directed by Romeo Castellucci at the Festival d' Avignon.

In the autumn of 2013 Avemo participated in the filming of Casanova Variations directed by Michael Sturminger. The film was premiered in 2014.

Avemo performs regularly in concerts with for example Bach's Passions, Brahm's Ein Deutsches Requiem, Carl Orff's Carmina Burana, Mozart's Great Mass in C minor and concert arias and music by Britten, Poulenc, Grieg and Weill. She has been heard in a series of European festivals and venues such as the Palais des Beaux Arts, the Théâtre des Champs-Élysées and the Berliner Philharmonie.

== Personal life ==
Avemo is married and has one son and a daughter. She has lived in Paris but is now back in her native Stockholm.

== Awards ==
- 2001: Folkoperan's Friends soloist stipend
- 2002: Svenska Dagbladet' Opera Award (Swedish: Svenska Dagbladets operapris)
- 2002: received the Opera Magazine prize
- 2016: received the Swedish Royal Medal Litteris et Artibus

== Discography ==
- CD – Gluck, Orpheus und Eurydice. Vienna Urfassung, in 1762. Drottningholm Theatre Orchestra. Conductor: Arnold Östman. Naxos 8.660064 S.
- CD – Handel, Messiah. Freiburger Barockorchester, Choir of Clare College, Cambridge. Conductor: René Jacobs. Harmonia Mundi HMC 901928.29.
- CD and DVD – Mernier, Frühlings Erwachen. Conductor: Jonas Alber. Cypres CYP4628. (2 CD + 1 DVD).
- DVD – Mozart, Blonde in Die Entführung aus dem Serail. With Diana Damrau. Oper Frankfurt. Frankfurter Museumsorchester. Conductor: Julia Jones. 24 January 2013.
- CD and DVD – Boesmans, Julie. With Malena Ernman and Gary Magee. Chamber Orchestra of La Monnaie. Conductor: Kazushi Ōno. Aix-en-Provence. 2008. Bel Air.
