= Lilly Krug =

German actress

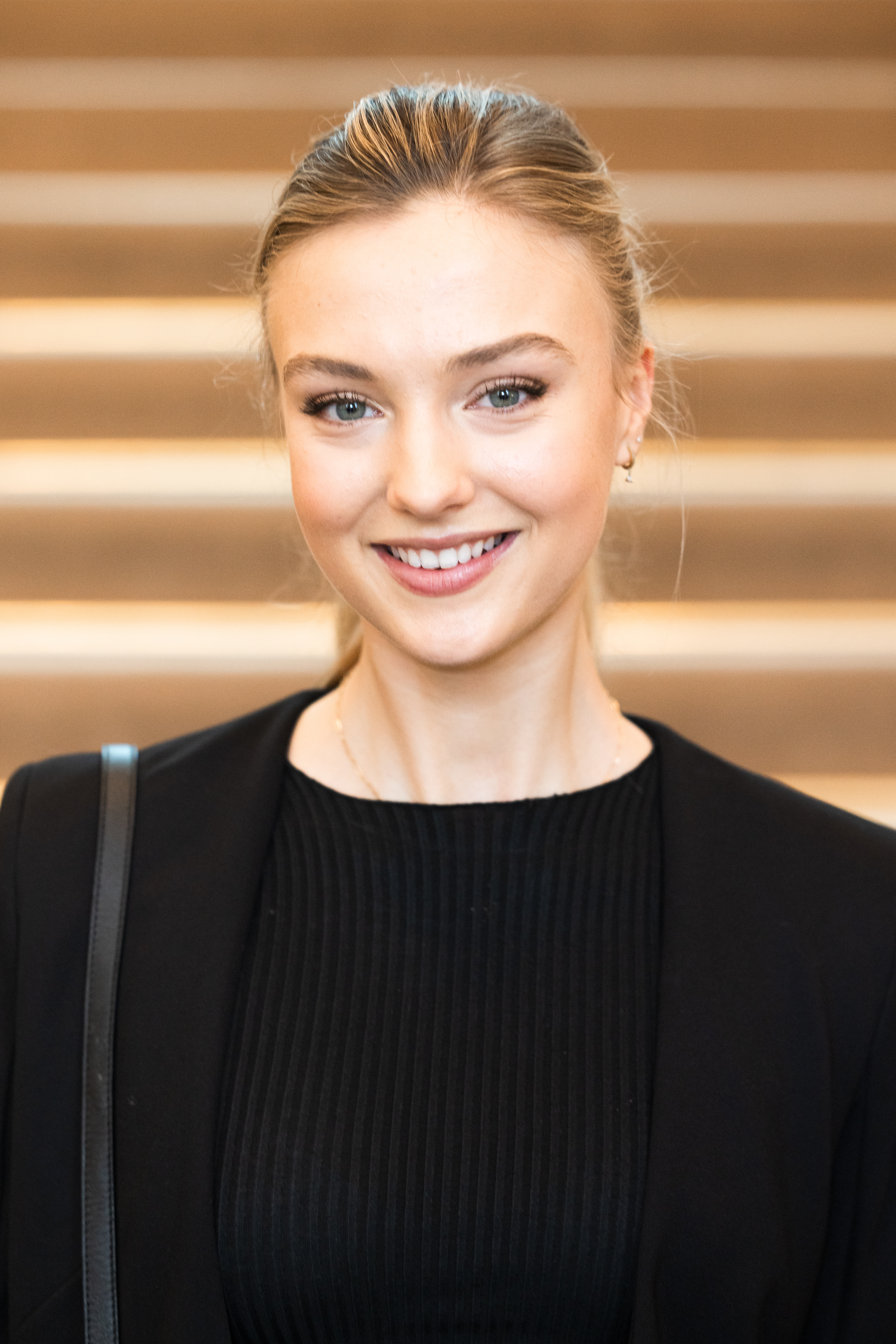
- Krug in 2024
- Born: 5 June 2001 (age 25); Munich, Germany
- Education: University of Southern California (BA) (enrolled)
- Occupation: Actress
- Years active: 2016–present
- Parent(s): Martin Krug (father); Veronica Ferres (mother)
- Relatives: Carsten Maschmeyer (step-father)
- Website: lillykrug.com

Lilly Krug (born 5 June 2001) is a German film and television actress.

== Early life and education ==
Lilly Krug was born in Munich to actress Veronica Ferres and marketing manager Martin Krug. After her parents had divorced and her mother remarried, entrepreneur Carsten Maschmeyer became her stepfather.

In 2019, Krug graduated from the Bavarian International School in Munich with the International Baccalaureate diploma. She went on to study psychology and acting at the University of Southern California.

== Career ==
Krug, who currently resides in Los Angeles, followed her mother's footsteps and began working as an actress. She has been featured in movies alongside Michael Shannon, Casey Affleck and Gael García Bernal.

Lilly has also mentioned that her idol and primary influence is actress Margot Robbie.

== Filmography ==
Year	Title	Role	Language	Director	Notes
2016	Salt and Fire	Passenger	English	Werner Herzog	
2019	Malou	Milena	German	Adi Wojaczek	Short film
2020	Gipfelstürmer - Das Berginternat	Lucie Albert	German		TV series - Episode "Sehtest"
2021	Every Breath You Take	Lilly	English	Vaughn Stein	
2021	Heart of Champions	Sara	English	Michael Mailer	
2022	Shattered	Sky	English	Luis Prieto	
2022	Zero Contact	Jamie	English	Rick Dugdale	
2023	Plane	Brie	English	Jean-François Richet	
2025	DRAGN	Adele Varens	English	Peter Webber	
2025	April X	April	English	Michel K. Parandi	
2025	Hurricanna	The Receptionist	English	Francesca Gregorini	
