= Shattered (2022 film) =

2022 American psychological thriller film

- Theatrical release poster
- Directed by: Luis Prieto
- Written by: David Loughery
- Produced by: Claudia Bluemhuber; Veronica Ferres; John Malkovich; Luis Prieto
- Starring: Cameron Monaghan; Frank Grillo; Lilly Krug; John Malkovich
- Edited by: Federico Conforti
- Music by: Tom Howe
- Production companies: Grindstone Entertainment Group; Silver Reel; Construction Film
- Distributed by: Lionsgate
- Release date: January 14, 2022
- Running time: 92 minutes
- Country: United States
- Language: English

Shattered is a 2022 American psychological thriller film directed by Luis Prieto and written by David Loughery. The film stars Cameron Monaghan, Frank Grillo, Lilly Krug, and John Malkovich.

== Plot ==
Chris is delaying signing divorce papers from Jamie when he bumps into Sky during a late-night shop. He comes to her rescue by offering a ride when her Uber is cancelled. On arriving at the motel she is staying at, she hesitates to leave saying that her roommate Lisa is a handful due to drugs and can be disruptive when not asleep. Chris suggests she could wait at his for a few hours and then he'll bring her back. After enjoying each other's company for a few hours, they make love and Sky heads to the motel in the morning where Lisa is furious.

Chris finds Sky at her workplace and walking back to his car catches someone trying to break in and an altercation follows. Due to a broken leg and cast, with Chris' lack of mobility Sky offers to help care for him. He gives her the passcodes for his house which is powered and secured by Watchdog, a security program he wrote for his company that his wife had thought always came first and led to the breakdown of his marriage, even though he had sold it as an attempt to prove it wasn't.

Sky goes to the motel to pick up some things and Lisa suggests she can't move out as she knows things. Ronald, their landlord, fed up with excuses on their overdue rent tries to get access to their rooms and with no answer lets himself in and is horrified to find Lisa dead in the bath. He gives the police Sky's name, but they find nobody of those details on file.

On hearing Chris broke his leg Jamie suggests an impromptu visit on Friday to allow their daughter Willow to cheer him up. Chris, feeling more positive and loved up, finally feels able to say he'll sign the divorce papers for her to collect as well.

The next day Chris wakes up unable to find his phone, but sees on the T.V. news that Lisa is dead. Sky arrives with food and won't discuss his phone until after they eat. During the conversation she mentions that she killed Lisa and only stayed there for two months to reconstruct his very specific schedule pattern via telescope. Knowing that his cleaner isn't due for a number of days, she locks all the doors with the app on his stolen phone and tasers Chris.

Waking up tied to a wheelchair, Sky requests his bank passwords by drilling through his broken leg. After Sky transfers millions, she stops him from attempting to escape by threatening to hurt his daughter. Meanwhile, Ronald is cleaning the rooms and spots the telescope. He proceeds to spy on a neighbor doing naked yoga, then pans around to Chris's house and spots Sky.

As he enters to begin removing property, it's revealed that Sky was working with the man who was trying to break into Chris's car and that breaking his leg was done purposefully. Left alone in the house, Ronald breaks in but rather than immediately helping Chris, he blackmails him for a reward and in the process of freeing him, Sky returns after being alerted on the app. As she chases Ronald through the house and kills him with a samurai sword, Chris frees the rest of his bonds and escapes on a snowbike but is catapulted off after hitting a rock. Being picked up by a driver he finally thinks he's free until he realizes he's being driven back to his house to a blood-soaked Sky.

The driver is her stepfather Sebastian and they started a relationship after Sky's mother abruptly died. She tells Chris that it's a shame he was a con as he's the best lover, and Chris says she could have had it all if she hadn't turned out to be a psychopath. The pair want millions in bonds that need face to face access at a bank and cut-off Chris's thumb so that Sebastian can pretend to be Chris by using a sling with the hidden digit. Before they leave, Jamie and Willow arrive unexpectedly and get locked into a room with Chris. Realizing Willow is small enough to access a vent to get them out she crawls out. Once alone, Chris says to Jamie what the thieves are after, and Jamie announces the bonds aren't in that safebox as they are now in her private box which means they'll be back soon.

Willow uses the passcode to get into the house just before Sky and Sebastian return. Chris and Sebastian fight but Sky suddenly chooses to shoot Sebastian in the hope that she and Chris can make up. Chris stabs Sky in the shoulder and grabs the phone and hides. He sends an SOS signal to the police while Sky hunts him and uses the app to access music and lights to distract her. Sky finds him and during their fight Jamie runs out to assist but also gets hurt. Just as Sky is about to kill them, they suddenly hear a gunshot and Sky falls to the floor, mortally wounded. It is revealed that Willow was behind her and shot her in the back.

== Cast ==
- Cameron Monaghan as Chris Decker
- Lilly Krug as Sky / Margaret
- Frank Grillo as Sebastian
- John Malkovich as Ronald
- Sasha Luss as Jamie Decker
- Ash Santos as Lisa
- Ridley Bateman as Willow Decker
- David Madison as Briggs
- Dat Phan as Kiju

== Production ==
Filming wrapped in Montana in June 2021.

== Release ==
The film was released in select theaters and On Demand on January 14, 2022, and released on DVD and Blu-ray on February 22, 2022.

== Reception ==
On the review aggregator website Rotten Tomatoes, 19% of 37 critics' reviews are positive, with an average rating of 3.9/10. Metacritic, which uses a weighted average, assigned the film a score of 27 out of 100, based on 6 critics, indicating "generally unfavorable" reviews.

Angela Dawson of Forbes gave the film a positive review, calling it a "simmering thriller that is reminiscent of classic femme fatale thrillers … but infused with a modern sensibility." Michael Nordine of Variety gave the film a negative review and wrote, "What follows has shades of everything from Misery to Audition, albeit with little of either film’s bawdy bravura." Matt Zoller Seitz of RogerEbert.com awarded the film one and a half stars, calling it "a machine that promises to fulfill certain functions. Unfortunately, the craftsmanship is lacking."
