= Carsten Maschmeyer =

German businessman

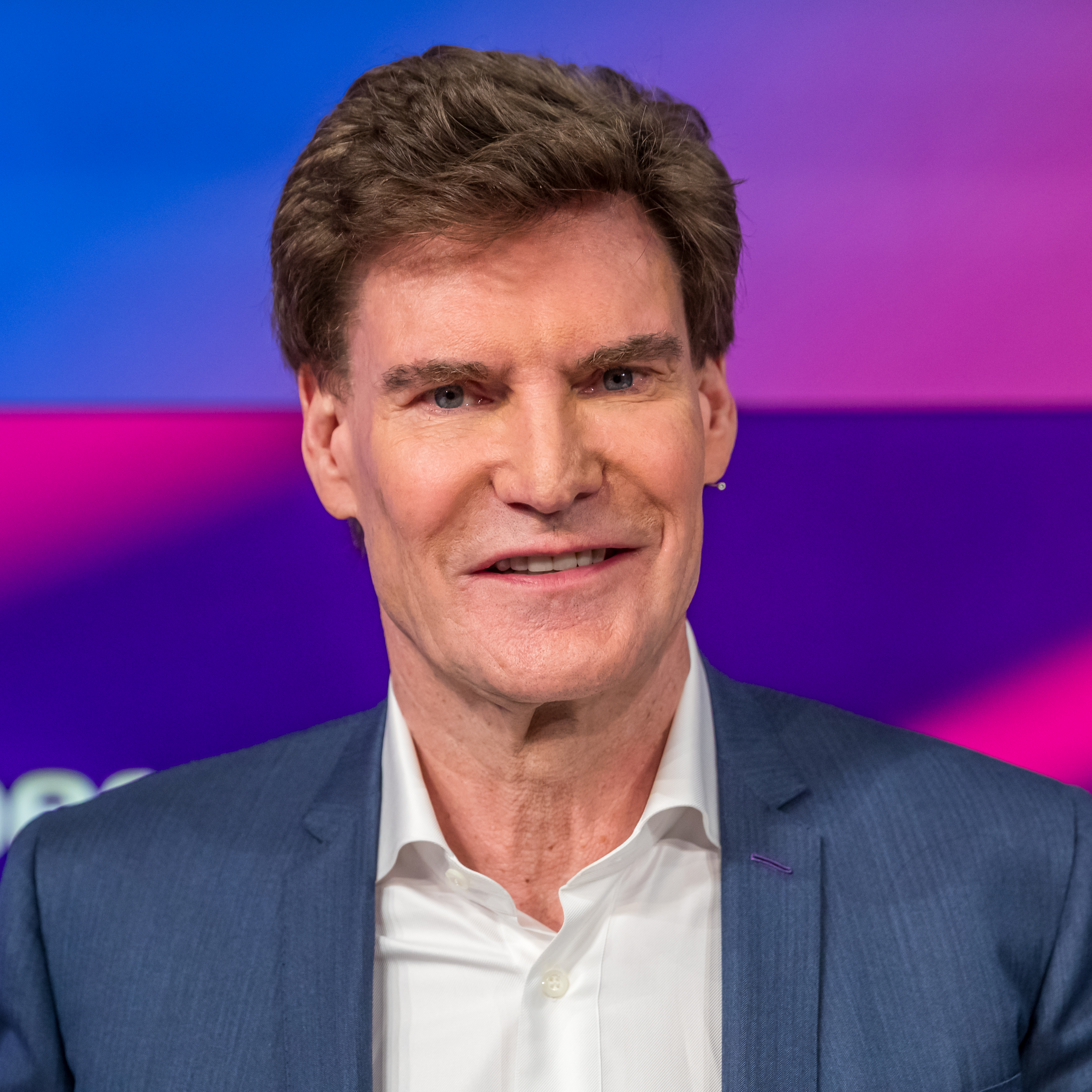
- Maschmeyer in 2025
- Born: Carsten Jens Maschmeyer; 8 May 1959 (age 67); Bremen, West Germany
- Occupations: Businessman, investor
- Years active: 1982–present
- Spouse: Veronica Ferres (m. 2014)
- Children: Lilly Krug (step-daughter); Marcel Jo Maschmeyer (son); Maurice Jean Maschmeyer (son)

Carsten Jens Maschmeyer (born 8 May 1959) is a German billionaire businessman, investor, and panel member of the German investment television series Die Höhle der Löwen ("The Lions' Den"). He is the founder and owner of the Maschmeyer Group which combines all of his current business activities. Through ALSTIN (Alternative Strategic Investments) he invests growth capital in emerging industries and future markets with innovations in sectors like the internet, technology, and life sciences. Through seed + speed Ventures, Maschmeyer provides pre-seed and seed investments to early-stage companies in Germany. To access the early-stage startup markets in the Americas and Israel, he co-founded Maschmeyer Group Ventures with Managing Partner Marc Schröder. As of 2026, Forbes estimated that Maschmeyer's net worth was $2 billion.

== Early life ==
Born in Bremen, Germany, Maschmeyer grew up in Hildesheim (Lower Saxony) and had a deprived childhood. He never saw his father and lived in an orphanage. He has one half-brother, whom he first met at the age of 40. As a teenager, he was a successful athlete (middle-distance-runner). In 1978, he completed his Abitur (higher-education entrance qualification) and joined the German Armed Forces for two years. To fund his university courses in medicine in Hanover, he worked part time in the sales department of a financial advisory firm (OVB Vermögensberatung) before becoming a full-time financial consultant in 1982, leaving the university without a degree. He became director of the Lower Saxony division at a very young age, responsible for approximately 3,000 people. He worked at OVB until 1987. Carsten Maschmeyer is a reserve officer of the Joint Medical Service of the Bundeswehr.

== Career ==
In 1988, Carsten Maschmeyer established an independent financial advisory for individuals by founding the AWD (Allgemeiner Wirtschaftsdienst) financial group. His company grew rapidly and became Europe's largest independent financial advisory. It went public in 2000, rising in the M-DAX (member of the 100 listed companies) as well as expanding into 11 countries employing approximately 11,000 people. It managed €15 billion (US$22 billion) for 2 million customers in 2007. In 2007, Swiss Life, the largest Swiss Life Insurance provider, bought all shares in the company for CHF 1,9 billion (approx. US$2.1 billion).

=== Investments ===
Maschmeyer presently maintains significant holdings in a variety of companies. In a recent study about the fastest growing startups in Germany, his private equity fund is the only one invested in two companies that were ranked in the top 10.

Maschmeyer founded the early-stage venture capital firm seed + speed in 2016. Based in Berlin, the firm invests in pre-seed and seed-stage B2B software startups, with Alexander Kölpin serving as managing director.

In 2017, Maschmeyer provided the founding capital for Maschmeyer Group Ventures, Inc., a San Francisco-based seed-stage venture capital firm co-founded and led by Marc Schröder, previously head of global sales at the Maschmeyer Group.

==== HMNC Brain Health ====
HMNC Brain Health (HMNC) specializes in developing diagnoses of and therapies for depression and anxiety disorders. Together with partners from academia, the company uses prominent research results to generate marketable concepts. The company was founded by Professor Florian Holsboer and Maschmeyer in December 2010 and is based in Munich, Bavaria. Both founders want to improve the treatment of depression and anxiety disorders. In 2026, HMNC completed the first $50 million closing of a Series B financing round led by MEDICE, with the Maschmeyer Group participating as an existing investor. The funding was intended to advance the company's BH-200 and KET01 depression-treatment programs.

==== Orderbird ====
Orderbird is the provider of a cash register system used by restaurants. The system is based on iPad technology and used by more than 5,000 eateries in Germany, Switzerland and Austria. In the 4th quarter of 2014 Concardis (MasterCard) joined as new strategic investor. Orderbird received accolades from the Financial Times in 2012. In May 2022, Orderbird was acquired by Nexi, and continued operating as an independent brand within the group.

==== Blacklane ====
Maschmeyer first invested in Blacklane, a worldwide booking platform for chauffeur-driven limousines with taxi-like pricing, in January 2013. Blacklane was recognized as Germany's fastest growing tech startup in March 2015. Maschmeyer's investment company, ALSTIN, invested in Blacklane again in August 2016, in Blacklane's biggest funding round to date, along with previous investors Daimler, RI Digital Ventures and b-to-v. In March 2026, Uber agreed to acquire Blacklane.

==== Usercentrics ====
In 2019, Maschmeyer's ALSTIN Capital led a Series A financing round for Usercentrics, a Munich-based developer of consent-management software.

==== Modern Health ====
Maschmeyer Group Ventures participated in Modern Health's 2018 seed financing round. In 2021, the workplace mental-health company was valued at $1.17 billion, making it the first company in Maschmeyer's investment portfolio to achieve "unicorn" status, with its valuation exceeding $1 billion.

=== Consultant, author, speaker ===
Maschmeyer also advises decision-makers on strategies in numerous businesses, e.g. large European banks and insurance companies. Maschmeyer is a frequent speaker in Germany, Austria and Switzerland, mostly on topics like entrepreneurship, investments, sales, communication, networking, marketing, success and mental power. Maschmeyer became a bestselling author through his book entitled "Selfmade - erfolg reich leben" which is about the fundamental rules of success. The book is presently in its 7th edition. Furthermore, his second book "Die Millionärsformel – Der Weg zur finanziellen Unabhängigkeit" also became a bestseller in the first few days following its publication.

=== Philanthropy ===
Maschmeyer is an honorary senator of the Leibniz University in Hanover and a freelance lecturer at the International School of Management in Munich. At both institutions, Maschmeyer finances scholarships. Motivated by his personal interest in psychology and neurology, he promotes the "Neurological Learning" project at the University of Hildesheim and co-founded the international "Neurobionic" foundation. He also finances a professorship at the Music College in Hanover. Moreover, Maschmeyer supports several charity projects and initiatives aimed at helping children. For example, he founded the "AWD Kinderhilfe", having paid all costs in order to ensure that every euro spent will be given to the projects, "Herz für Kinder". In recent years, he gave the largest single donation, €1 million, that has ever been received. He also donated a helicopter to the Order of Saint John (Bailiwick of Brandenburg), a voluntary humanitarian organization, and supports the ALS-Gala, Sean Penn's "J/P Haitian Relief Organization", Surgeon-Congress and HOPE Cape Town against AIDS, the Elton John AIDS Foundation. In 2015, Maschmeyer shared his private house in Hanover with two Syrian refugee families for several months in order to help them build new lives in Germany. He provides online-language learning programs to refugees for free.

=== Television ===
Maschmeyer announced he would be joining the TV show Die Höhle der Löwen, produced by German TV channel VOX, as a potential investor in new ideas showcased on the programme. This is the German version of the US show Shark Tank. Entrepreneurs present their business ideas to five "lions" (or investors), who then invest their own money and in return receive shares in the business.

=== Legal ===
==== Bank Safra Sarasin ====
Maschmeyer was a litigant in a legal dispute against Bank Safra Sarasin, along with several prominent investors. Together with other investors, he invested €40 million in a fund (Sheridan fund) that was offered by Bank Safra Sarasin. Unbeknown to the investors, the fund was based on illegal tax refunds. After several proceedings, the bank refunded Maschmeyer.

==== MLP ====
As CEO of AWD, Maschmeyer's vision was a merger between AWD and MLP, a German financial advisory. In 2008, he held 26.74% of MLP-shares, however, the takeover failed. Afterwards, MLP accused Maschmeyer of having violated reputing obligations, but did not succeed in terms of their claim.

== Personal life ==
Maschmeyer maintains residences in Munich and Hanover, Germany; Côte d'Azur, France and Beverly Hills, California, United States. He has been married to the German actress Veronica Ferres since 2014 and is the father of two sons from a previous marriage, and a stepdaughter. Maschmeyer has an art collection which includes works by Damien Hirst, Andreas Gursky, David Reed, Daniel Richter, Thomas Ruff, Steve McQueen, David LaChapelle, Anselm Kiefer and Igor Mitoraj.
