= Kidnap (2017 film) =

2017 film by Luis Prieto

- Theatrical release poster
- Directed by: Luis Prieto
- Written by: Knate Lee
- Produced by: Lorenzo di Bonaventura; Erik Howsam; Joey Tufaro; Gregory Chou; Halle Berry; Elaine Goldsmith-Thomas
- Starring: Halle Berry; Sage Correa; Chris McGinn; Lew Temple
- Cinematography: Flavio Labiano
- Edited by: Avi Youabian
- Music by: Federico Jusid
- Production companies: di B Pictures; Lotus Entertainment; 606 Films; Gold Star Films; Ingenious Media; Well Go USA; Rumble Entertainment
- Distributed by: Aviron Pictures
- Release dates: July 31, 2017 (ArcLight Hollywood); August 4, 2017 (United States)
- Running time: 95 minutes
- Country: United States
- Language: English
- Budget: $21 million
- Box office: $34.8 million

Kidnap is a 2017 American action thriller film directed by Luis Prieto and written by Knate Lee. It stars Halle Berry, Sage Correa, Chris McGinn, and Lew Temple. The story follows a working mother who pursues her young son's captors. The film was produced by di B Pictures, Lotus Entertainment, 606 Films, Gold Star Films, Ingenious Media, Well Go USA, and Rumble Entertainment on a budget of $21 million. It was announced in September 2014, and filmed in New Orleans and Slidell, Louisiana from October to December 2014.

The film's original distributor, Relativity Media, filed for bankruptcy in 2015, delaying its release several times. In May 2017, the newly founded Aviron Pictures acquired the distribution rights. Kidnap premiered at the ArcLight Hollywood multiplex on July 31, 2017, and was released in the United States on August 4. The film received mixed reviews; critics commended Berry's performance but criticized the writing and directing. At the 49th NAACP Image Awards, Berry was nominated for Outstanding Actress in a Motion Picture.

== Plot ==
Waitress and single mother Karla Dyson takes her six-year-old son, Frankie, to a carnival. While there, she receives a call from her lawyer discussing a custody battle over Frankie. After the call, Karla loses sight of her son. She looks for him, but only finds his toy voice recorder. In the parking lot, she sees a woman physically dragging her son into a green Ford Mustang driven by a man. Karla initially chases after them on foot before entering her vehicle and driving after them, leaving her phone behind after she initially drops it.

The two kidnappers evade Karla by tossing a spare tire into a busy highway and causing a chain reaction crash pile-up and then threatening to kill Frankie with a knife. Karla learns the female assailant's name is Margo through a recording from her son's toy. She purposely attracts the attention of a police officer on a motorcycle and explains the situation to him, but the kidnappers kill him. Margo talks to Karla, requesting $10,000 in exchange for her son. Margo enters Karla's car and tells her to follow her accomplice's car. At Belle Chasse Tunnel, Margo attacks Karla, who fights back and throws Margo out of the car. The other captor threatens to hurt Frankie, forcing Karla to stop following him.

Minutes later, Karla comes across a traffic jam and finds the Mustang smashed-up and abandoned. She's told by other motorists that the male driver and Frankie are now traveling on foot. Karla goes to the police station to report the kidnapping but, taking note of the number of missing children that are never found, decides to take matters into her own hands. She spots the male kidnapper, named Terry, in a stolen black Volvo V70 and attempts to intercept the vehicle, but fails to do so, she chases him until her vehicle runs out of fuel. She tries to hitch a ride from a motorist, but they are blindsided by the Volvo and the good samaritan is killed instantly. Terry emerges from the car with a shotgun, but Karla manages to trap his arm in the door of her minivan, then disabling its parking brake so it rolls downhill, crashing into a tree, killing Terry. She finds his identification card that contains his address. Once there, she dials 911 and then locates Frankie in a barn with two other kidnapped children she saw pictures of at the police station earlier that day. Karla and her son leave, promising to come back, they hide underwater after Margo and her dog appear. Karla pulls Margo underwater and drowns her and shoots the dog. Karla returns to the barn with her son and encounters a man claiming to be a neighbour. She realises he is part of the child kidnapping ring when he calls out to the children, saying how many children are hiding and that they are girls. The man tries to kill Karla, but Karla knocks him out with a shovel saying, "You took the wrong kid." The police arrive shortly afterward, and all the children are rescued. Karla's actions lead to the dissolution of an international child abduction ring, and she is praised for saving the children.

== Cast ==
- Halle Berry as Karla Dyson, a working mother whose son is kidnapped
- Sage Correa as Frankie McCoy-Dyson, Karla's six-year-old son
- Chris McGinn as Margo Vickey, a female kidnapper and Terry's wife
- Lew Temple as Terrence / Terry Vickey, a male kidnapper and Margo's husband
- Jason Winston George as David Dyson, Karla's estranged husband
- Christopher Berry as Bearded man, the middleman of the child kidnapping ring
- Taryn Terrell as Pedestrian girl hit by the kidnapper's black Volvo
- Brice Fisher as Tyler, a customer who complains about his hashbrowns

== Production ==
Kidnap was announced at the 67th Cannes Film Festival on May 15, 2014, with Halle Berry joining the cast of the Luis Prieto–directed feature. The film is a co-production between di B Pictures, Lotus Entertainment, 606 Films, Gold Star Films, Ingenious Media, Well Go USA, and Rumble Entertainment. Relativity Media acquired the distribution rights in September, and Sage Correa, Chris McGinn, and Lew Temple were added to the cast in October. Berry said that as a mother, she found her character's actions to be genuine and representational of a loving parent. Principal photography took place from October 27 to December 7, 2014, in New Orleans and Slidell, Louisiana, with cinematographer Flavio Labiano. Prieto said the action sequences were inspired by films from the 1980s that encouraged him to implement practical effects, so the actors' reactions could be genuine, instead of CGI. Filming locations included the New Orleans City Park, the Huey P. Long Bridge, the Crescent City Connection, Interstate 310, I-10, and the Highway 11 bridge in Slidell. During post-production, the film score was composed by Federico Jusid.

== Release ==
=== Theatrical ===
In September 2014, Relativity Media gave the film a release date for October 9, 2015. However, in July 2015, the distributor was $320 million in debt and filed for Chapter 11 bankruptcy, which resulted in the release date for Kidnap being moved to February 26, 2016. By September, Kidnap was put on hiatus, to the dismay of several producers, and in December 2015, the company vowed to release the film the following year, setting it for May 13 before postponing it to December 2. In November 2016, Relativity removed Kidnap from its schedule altogether, but after several positive test screenings, the company scheduled the film for March 10, 2017, while also trying to sell the film to potential distributors. In May 2017, the newly founded Aviron Pictures bought the distribution rights to the film. On July 31, 2017, Kidnap premiered at the ArcLight Hollywood multiplex, before being theatrically released in the United States and Canada on August 4, 2017.

=== Home media ===
Kidnap was released on Digital HD via digital distribution through Amazon Video and iTunes on October 17, 2017, before receiving its physical release on DVD and Blu-ray on October 31. In its first week, the film sold 47,629 DVDs and 33,521 Blu-rays as the sixth-most sold feature on both formats in the United States. The following week, the feature sold 16,706 DVDs and 13,060 Blu-rays, moving down the charts to tenth and twelfth place, respectively. In December 2017, Home Media Magazine revealed that on its "rental chart", the film had moved to first place after becoming available on Redbox. Overall, Kidnap made $3.9 million through home media releases.

== Reception ==
=== Box office ===
Kidnap grossed $31 million in the United States and Canada, and $3.8 million in other territories, for a worldwide total of $34.8 million against a production budget of $21 million.

The film was released alongside The Dark Tower and the wide expansion of Detroit, and was projected to gross $8 million from 2,378 theaters in its opening weekend. It made $3.7 million on its opening day (including $500,000 from Thursday night previews), and $10 million in its opening weekend, placing fifth at the box office. Television advertisements that aired throughout its second week in theaters cost $4.53 million, and the film made $5 million in its second weekend. Kidnap was removed from theaters after 105 days.

=== Critical response ===
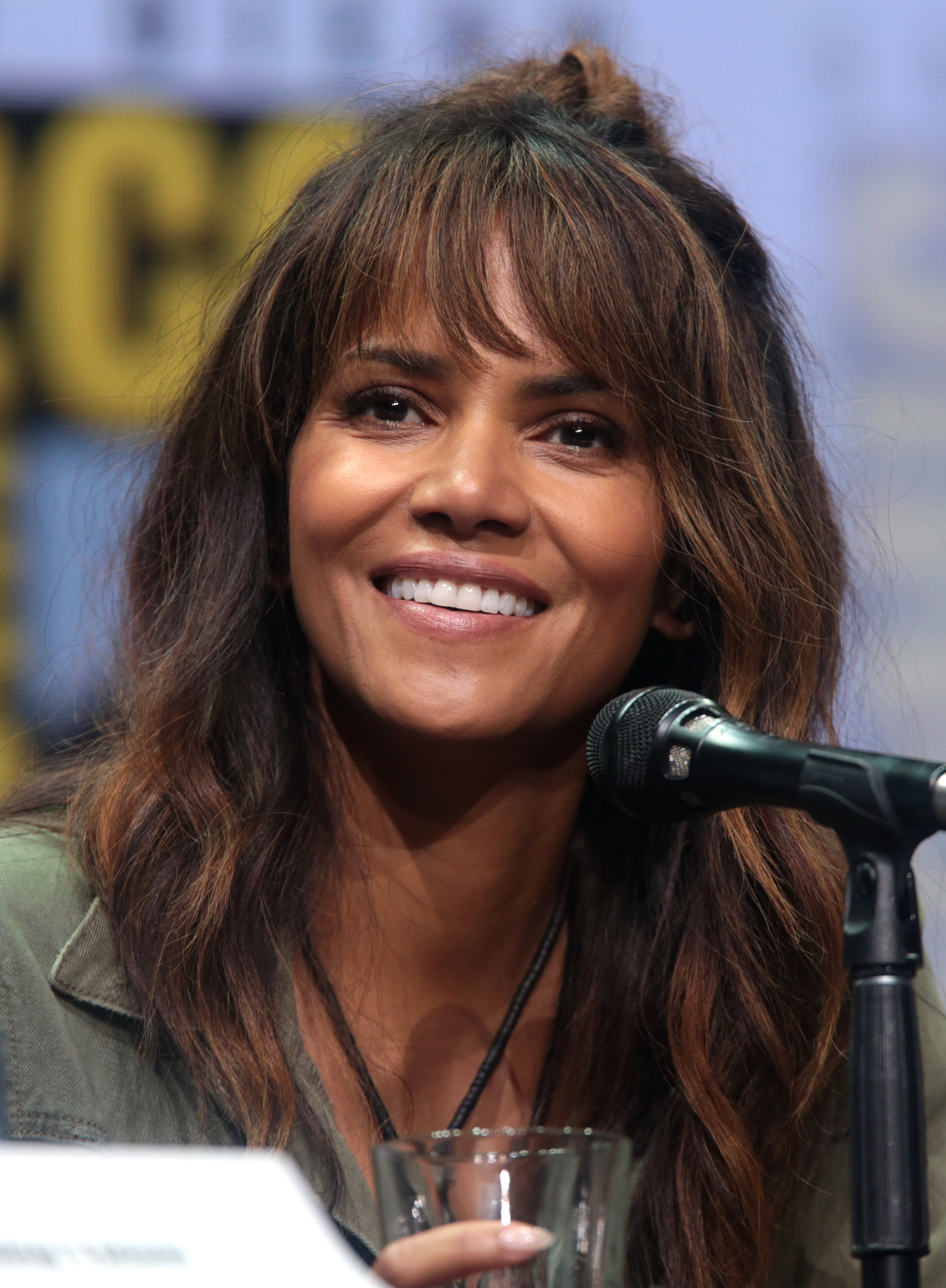
Halle Berry received praise for her performance.

On the review aggregator website Rotten Tomatoes, 35% of 94 critics' reviews are positive, with an average rating of 4.4/10. The website's critical consensus reads, "Kidnap strays into poorly scripted exploitation too often to take advantage of its pulpy premise – or the still-impressive talents of its committed star." Metacritic, which uses a weighted average, assigned the film a score of 44 out of 100, based on 26 critics, indicating "mixed or average" reviews. Audiences polled by CinemaScore gave the film an average grade of "B+" on an A+ to F scale, while PostTrak reported 74% of audience members gave it a positive score, with 53% saying they would definitely recommend it.

Glenn Kenny, writing for RogerEbert.com, gave the feature half a star out of four, called it "garbage", and gave negative remarks to the screenplay, overall plot, and the main character's tendency to talk to herself throughout the entire film. David Ehrlich from IndieWire gave it a "D−" along with a similar response where he also criticized the directing, writing that Prieto "never demonstrates the interest to allow his heroine to take things into her own hands, but the movie does gain momentum as it chugs along."

Writing for the Chicago Tribune, Michael Phillips gave Kidnap two stars out of five, and said that the film did not do everything possible to take advantage of its "own monstrously exploitative premise" and instead focused on making it realistic. The Chicago Sun-Times' Richard Roeper also gave the same rating and criticized the runtime, screenplay, characters, cinematography, and repetitive closeups, while also giving praise to Halle Berry's performance. From Time Out, Michael Gingold gave a three stars out of five mixed review, where he said the film was "more absurd than Taken". In his three stars out of four review, Rex Reed from The New York Observer found the feature to be "another entry in the overcrowded, snatched-in-broad-daylight genre of abducted-children thrillers", but said that it had "no shortage of thrills".

Alonso Duralde from TheWrap summarized the entire film and Berry's performance by saying that it is a "cheesy little thriller, an unapologetic B-movie and a clear attempt by Oscar-winner Halle Berry at having a Taken of her very own." From The New York Times, Teo Bugbee gave Kidnap a positive review, writing that it "doesn't waste time trying to build an arc to Karla's desperation" and found that Berry "approaches the task of playing this unhinged mother on the run with sincerity [...] her adrenaline kicks in the moment she sees Frankie being shoved into the back seat of an unfamiliar Mustang, and it doesn't dip until the credits roll."

=== Accolades ===
In June 2018, Kidnap was awarded The ReFrame Stamp for its representation of women. At the annual Taurus World Stunt Awards, Taryn Terrell received a nomination for Best Overall Stunt by a Stuntwoman and won for Hardest Hit. In July 2018, Brice Fisher was nominated at the 39th Young Artist Awards for Best Performance in a Feature Film – Supporting Teen Actor. At the 49th NAACP Image Awards, Berry earned a nomination for Outstanding Actress in a Motion Picture.
