= Every Breath You Take (film) =

2021 American psychological thriller film

- Official release poster
- Directed by: Vaughn Stein
- Written by: David Murray
- Produced by: Richard B. Lewis; Veronica Ferres; Morgan Emmery; Jean-Charles Levy
- Starring: Casey Affleck; Sam Claflin; Veronica Ferres; India Eisley; Emily Alyn Lind; Michelle Monaghan
- Cinematography: Michael Merriman
- Edited by: Laura Jennings
- Music by: Marlon Espino
- Production companies: Southpaw Entertainment; Construction Films; 13 Films; Fourward Entertainment; Trinity Film Financing; Vertical Entertainment
- Distributed by: Vertical Entertainment
- Release date: April 2, 2021 (United States)
- Running time: 105 minutes
- Countries: United States; Germany
- Language: English
- Box office: $338,771

Every Breath You Take, also known as You Belong to Me, is a 2021 psychological thriller film directed by Vaughn Stein and written by David Murray. It stars Casey Affleck, Michelle Monaghan, Sam Claflin, and Veronica Ferres. It follows a psychiatrist whose life is disrupted after a client's brother who, after the client's death, insinuates himself into the psychiatrist's family.

It was released on April 2, 2021, by Vertical Entertainment.

== Plot ==
Philip Clark is a psychiatrist who lives a strained, distant life with his wife Grace and daughter Lucy, who are all struggling to cope with grief associated with the death of the younger child, Evan, after a car accident three years prior.

Among Philip's clients is Daphne Flagg, a young depressive woman recovering from an abusive relationship, which she was able to leave with the support of Philip's therapy. Daphne is writing a book about her struggle with mental illness.

One afternoon, Philip receives a call from Daphne, who tells him that her best friend Joan has been killed in a hit-and-run accident. Later, Daphne is found dead outside her home, which the police believe to be suicide. Philip comforts her estranged British brother, James Flagg, who arrives at the scene extremely distraught. The next evening, James drops by Philip's house to drop off a book that Daphne had borrowed; sympathetic, Grace invites him to stay for dinner. Philip learns that James has written a book called Shadow Cast and is interested in buying it, which will take two weeks to arrive.

Dr. Vanessa Fanning confronts Philip for the unconventional methods he employed to help Daphne, which included confiding in her things that he had never shared with his family. Grace meets up with James to discuss selling his sister's house. She tells him that despite Philip's profession, he has been unable to address the pain of losing Evan and, as a result, the couple has become alienated from each other and from Lucy. Philip soon notices an inappropriate connection between his wife and James and asks James to stay away. Grace secretly goes to see James again and, despite her attempts to break off their relationship, they have sex.

James files a formal complaint against Philip with the Washington Board of Psychiatry, and Philip is suspended from his practice until it is fully investigated. James also befriends Lucy, who has a history of discipline and drug problems stemming from her grief over losing her half-brother, and they soon form a romantic connection. Lucy expresses a desire to run away, and James persuades her to pack her bags so they can do so together, but then later ignores her phone calls, leaving her heartbroken.

When Grace's car breaks down, James conveniently appears and offers her a ride. He purposely misses a turn and begins driving erratically, then knocks Grace unconscious as she attempts to alert Philip. Philip chases them down and saves Grace. Back at home, they tell Lucy that James is a dangerous man but she does not believe them, obsessed by her idea of their relationship. Philip receives a call from Dr. Toth who tells him that James admitted himself to a psychiatry facility due to auditory hallucinations. Philip visits James who admits that he read Daphne's notes about her therapy with Philip, and about Philip's family background. As he is escorted back into his cell, James maniacally tells Philip that he "still smells" Grace.

Philip finally receives Shadow Cast and sees the real James Flagg on the back cover, exposing the James they have all met as an American man called Eric Dalton, Daphne's abusive ex-boyfriend. Philip discovers that Eric is psychotic; he killed Joan to make Daphne distraught in hopes that she would return to him, and when she didn't, he murdered Daphne. Philip realizes Eric has been taunting his family because Philip had helped Daphne end her relationship with Eric. Philip calls Dr. Toth to order him to lock Eric down, but Eric has already escaped after killing security guard.

Realizing that Eric is going after Lucy, Philip and Grace race back to their house. Eric attacks Lucy and, after a violent struggle, Grace kills him with the blade of Evan's old ice-skating boot. The three embrace as the police sirens approach.

== Cast ==
- Casey Affleck as Phillip Clark
- Michelle Monaghan as Grace Watson
- Sam Claflin as James Flagg / Eric Dalton
- Veronica Ferres as Dr. Vanessa Fanning
- Emily Alyn Lind as Daphne Flagg
- India Eisley as Lucy Watson
- Hiro Kanagawa as Dr. Toth
- Vincent Gale as Stuart Fanning
- Lilly Krug as Lilly Fanning
- Brenden Sunderland as Evan

== Production ==
In June 2012, it was announced Rob Reiner would direct the film, at that time titled You Belong to Me, from a screenplay by David Murray. In October 2012, it was announced Harrison Ford and Zac Efron had joined the cast of the film. In October 2019, it was announced Casey Affleck, Michelle Monaghan, Sam Claflin and Veronica Ferres were cast in the film, and that Christine Jeffs would be directing. In December 2019, it was announced Vaughn Stein would replace Jeffs as director who dropped out.

=== Filming ===
Principal photography began in Vancouver in December 2019.

== Release ==
In March 2021, Vertical Entertainment acquired distribution rights to the film, and set its release in US theaters and on VOD for April 2, 2021.

== Reception ==
=== Box office ===
Every Breath You Take grossed a worldwide total of $338,771.

=== Critical response ===
The film received largely negative reviews from critics. On review aggregator Rotten Tomatoes, the film holds a 20% approval rating based on 41 reviews, with an average rating of 4.2/10. The website's critics consensus reads: "Despite the A-list talent involved, Every Breath You Take never amounts to much more than a thuddingly familiar psychological thriller". On Metacritic, the film holds a rating of 32 out of 100, based on eight critics, indicating "generally unfavorable" reviews.
