= Aviron Pictures =

American film company

- Type: Private
- Industry: Film industry
- Predecessor: Clarius Entertainment
- Founded: May 11, 2017; 9 years ago
- Founder: William Sadleir
- Defunct: May 22, 2020; 6 years ago
- Fate: Inactive
- Headquarters: Beverly Hills, California, U.S.
- Area served: Worldwide
- Key people: David Dinerstein; William Sadleir; Greg Forston; Claire Heath
- Number of employees: 11-50 people
- Website: avironpictures.com

Aviron Pictures was an American film production and distribution company founded by William Sadleir, founder of Clarius Entertainment (which, as the company went inactive shortly after his departure, Aviron can be considered a successor of) and David Dinerstein, a founder of Paramount Classics and formerly of Lakeshore Entertainment and LD Entertainment, in 2017.

== History ==
In May 2017, it was announced David Dinerstein had launched a film production and distribution company that would release up to eight wide release films, per year, starting off to distribute Kidnap, Drunk Parents, and The Strangers: Prey at Night. In February 2018, it was announced the company had acquired Serenity, and A Private War.

In 2019, a lawsuit was filed by investor BlackRock against Aviron and its founder William Sadleir, citing fraud and financial impropriety in the company structure. Sadleir subsequently exited from his role as the operating manager of Aviron Pictures, a subsidiary of Aviron Group, in January 2020; he had already had a history of sketchy financial health, even further proven from the short history of money-losing features from his previous company Clarius Entertainment, directly resulting in said company silently ending most operations shortly after his departure in 2015.

On May 22, 2020, U.S. Attorney for the Southern District of New York, Geoffrey Berman, announced multiple fraud charges against William Sadleir. He was charged with wire fraud and aggravated identity theft to convince BlackRock to invest $75 million in his Aviron Group, he then allegedly siphoned off more than $20 million from his production company and diverted more than $14 million of it into his mansion. Sadleir also allegedly redirected nearly $1 million of the Coronavirus Paycheck Protection Program loans he applied, meant to keep Aviron staff on payroll, for his personal debts. On January 19, 2022, Sadleir pled guilty and was sentenced on September 9, 2022, to 72 months in prison.

== Filmography ==
Release date	Title	Notes
August 4, 2017	Kidnap	
March 9, 2018	The Strangers: Prey at Night	
August 31, 2018	Destination Wedding	Under their "Regatta" banner.
November 2, 2018	A Private War	
January 25, 2019	Serenity	
April 12, 2019	After	

== See also ==
- Neon
- STX Entertainment
- Rogue Pictures
- A24
- Annapurna Pictures
- Blumhouse Productions
- Bleecker Street
- Drafthouse Films
