= Blacklane =

German chauffeur company based in Berlin

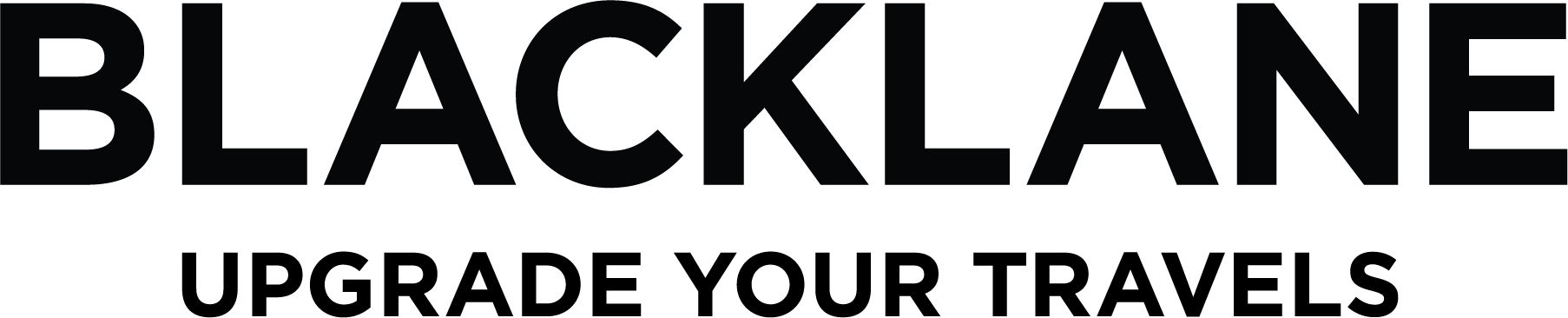
- Type: Privately held company
- Industry: Transport
- Founded: September 2011; 15 years ago in Berlin, Germany
- Founders: Jens Wohltorf, Frank Steuer
- Headquarters: Berlin, Germany
- Area served: Worldwide
- Services: Professional chauffeur and airport concierge service
- Number of employees: over 300 (2025)
- Website: blacklane.com/en

Blacklane GmbH is a provider of premium global chauffeur services, which provides a chauffeur portal connecting people to professional chauffeurs via their mobile app, website and hotline. The company offers a prebooking service at a fixed rate and doesn't own its own fleet, but works with local chauffeur companies in each of its cities. Airport pickups include one hour of free waiting time, while all non-airport pickups include 15 minutes. Guests can also edit or cancel their bookings for free up to one hour before a one-way transfer.

In 2026 Uber announced an acquisition of Blacklane.

== History ==
=== 2011-2012 ===
The company was founded in 2011 university friends, Jens Wohltorf and Frank Steuer, in Berlin, Germany. Backed by the investors RI Digital Ventures, B-to-V Partners, 88 investments GmbH, and Car4you, the company officially launched in June 2012. From the beginning of September, they were operating in Düsseldorf, Frankfurt, Hamburg, Cologne, München and Stuttgart. By the end of the year, they had added Bremen, Leipzig, Dresden and Hannover.

=== 2013 ===
In January 2013, it was reported that another investment round had successfully been closed with RI Digital Ventures, B-to-V Partners and Car4You taking part again, as well as Alternative Strategic Investments (Alstin), owned by German investor, Carsten Maschmeyer, taking part. By May 2013, the company was operating in Germany, Austria, Switzerland, the Netherlands, Italy, France and the UK. In August 2013, Blacklane started a project called "Mission 100", which saw 100 cities launched in as many days, ending on 16 December in Palma de Mallorca. This project took Blacklane's coverage to 130 cities and 45 countries by the end of 2013. A day after the launch in Palma de Mallorca, it was announced that Daimler AG had invested around 10 million euros in the start up, valuing the company at just under 60 million euros.

=== 2014 ===
In March, Blacklane officially launched in eight UK cities - London, Manchester, Birmingham, Bristol, Leeds, Liverpool, Edinburgh and Glasgow - after completing its year-long beta phase. Also announced in March was the testing of Blacklane's Smart Class in Berlin. The "Mobilität im Wandel: Fortschritt oder Stillstand?" conference took place on 17 September 2014, in the Ritz-Carlton hotel, Berlin 10,12. The conference was called by Jens Wohltorf, the CEO and Founder of Blacklane, in the hope of provoking an open dialogue and providing the opportunity to collaborate not through the media, but face-to-face with decision makers from government, business, the taxi industry and mobility startups. Most attention was paid to Uber Germany's General Manager and spokesperson, Fabien Nestmann, with Uber being called "criminal", and Nestmann being asked if he is in favour of "Schwarzarbeit", by Michael Müller, the President of the German Taxi and Car Hire Association. The main argument for this was focused on opponents saying Uber was trying to get around Germany's "Personenbeförderungsgesetz" which determines the rules of passenger transportation. Further attendees and speakers included Kai Wegner of the CDU/CSU political party, Alexander Mönch from MyTaxi, Sabine Toepfer Kataw, Secretary of State in the Senate Department of Justice and Consumer Protection, Robert Henrich, from moovel GmbH, Clemens Grün, from the Hamburg Taxi Union and Sascha Schubert, from the Federal Union of German Startups.

=== 2015 ===
In March 2015, Blacklane partnered with Amadeus IT Group. Also in March, Blacklane was recognized as Germany's fastest growing tech startup at the European Tech5 Awards in Berlin. In April, Blacklane expanded service to 36 more cities in North America. Quartz, a news publication from Atlantic Media, used this launch to discuss the company's business model: "Blacklane, a Berlin-based taxi app operating in 186 cities across 50 countries, is betting on an alternative to price rationing: reverse Dutch auctions." A traditional Dutch auction starts with a high price and consistently goes lower until the item is sold, but with reverse auctions, the price starts low and goes higher until it is sold. For Blacklane, when a ride is booked, an offer is sent out to drivers at a low price, and after a few minutes, if no one buys the ride, then the price goes up. Blacklane made Wired UK's list of Europe's Hottest Startups 2015.

=== 2016 ===
In February 2016, Blacklane added Las Vegas to its destinations followed by Venice, Monaco and Toulouse in July. On 1 August Blacklane announced new investment in its biggest funding round yet. Daimler, RI Digital Ventures, b-to-v and Alstin invested in this round. The amount has been described as "eight-digit" by Daimler or "more than 10 million euros" by Blacklane's CEO, Jens Wohltorf. In early November 2016, the German hotel reservation service HRS chose Blacklane as its “first professional driver service to transfer guests from airports to their accommodation”. In December Ralf Echtler, a former Daimler executive, joined Blacklane as chief operating and chief financial officer. Echtler had previously sat on Blacklane's board of advisors. Blacklane also announced the rolling out of an additional 64 cities in 12 countries across the Asia-Pacific region, the opening of a regional office in Singapore and a partnership with Asia Miles. When Daimler increased their presence with Blacklane it was to enable a larger customer base in Asia Pacific and the Middle East.

=== 2017 ===
In February 2017, Blacklane integrated with the global ground transportation system GroundSpan. This gave the company connectivity with the Concur Technologies, Sabre (computer system) and Travelport travel tools.

In March, Hertz announced its new "Hertz Driver Services powered by Blacklane." Hertz offers Blacklane rides around the world to customers based in Belgium, Czech Republic, France, Germany, Italy, Luxembourg, Netherlands, Spain, and the United Kingdom. Expedia, Inc. was also named as a customer. Expedia offers Blacklane as an add-on for customers' flight and hotel reservations. In April, Blacklane and Asia Miles offered a triple miles promotion for every U.S. dollar, euro or British pound spent on completed rides. Asia Miles is the rewards program for Cathay Pacific airline. In June, Blacklane integrated into Finnair. The partnership allows travellers to buy airport transfers when they purchase flights. In an industry first, Finnair connects air tickets to rides with the Passenger Name Record. In September, Blacklane partnered with Qatar Airways to provide passengers with door-to-door transportation. In October, Blacklane partnered with Lufthansa’s Miles & More awards program for a promotion where members could sign up to receive five times the miles for every Blacklane ride taken that month. Blacklane also acquired Solve, an airport concierge booking service, planning to integrate their service in December. Solve offers meet and greet service, fast-track security, expedited customs and immigration, connecting flight assistance, and lounge access.

=== 2018 ===
24 January Blacklane announced their largest funding round to date, with ALFAHIM joining existing investors Daimler and btov Partners. They also launched their airport concierge service, Blacklane PASS, and a service class of electric vehicles called the Green Class.

=== 2019 ===
In February, Blacklane opened their Australian office in Brisbane. In March the company began their expansion into the Middle East by offering chauffeur services in Amman, Jordan, and Beirut, Lebanon. Blacklane plans an IPO in the next three years, according to Blacklane CEO Jens Wohltorf. During an interview at a Dubai tourism fair, Wohltorf stated "this would be a natural evolution of our business model and our traction to IPO in the next years to come. That’s pretty realistic."

On 6 June 2019 Blacklane unveiled their rebrand. The company moved towards humanizing the chauffeur industry, placing the chauffeurs at the heart of the company. "A chauffeur inspires confidence in every personal interaction and maneuver of the vehicle. We infuse that premium experience into our entire brand and in every traveler’s encounter with us," said Wohltorf. "Chauffeurs, airport concierges, and everyone behind the scenes go the extra mile, literally and figuratively, to anticipate guests’ needs and perform service with precision."

On 1 August 2019 CEO Jens Wohltorf was featured on the cover of the German-language print edition of Forbes (DACH) "Smart Cities".

On 16 August 2019, it was announced that Blacklane will be working with Miracle Flights, a nonprofit organization providing free air transportation to families and children in need of medical assistance throughout the United States.

=== 2020 ===
In September, Blacklane announced flat rates for intercity rides to and from London, England, and in December they announced new rates for various intercity routes in the United States.

=== 2021 ===
In February, Blacklane invested in London-based all-electric chauffeur service Havn, acquiring a majority stake.

In March, Blacklane launched "chauffeur hailing", a ride-hailing service with chauffeurs, in 22 cities. They also raised €22 million in funding which further develops their intercity and chauffeur hailing services, as well as supporting sustainability initiatives.

== Regulatory opposition and outcomes ==
=== Taxi price misrepresentation 2013 ===
In April 2013, Blacklane came under attack from taxi companies saying that they were misrepresenting their pricing. The accusation, which saw Blacklane taken to court in Berlin, was that Blacklane had unfairly and, to a great part, incorrectly presented taxi prices with a number of "hidden" additional costs. These additional costs included such things as 10% for potential delays due to traffic as well as a requirement to pay a 10% tip. This led to Blacklane's own pre-tax prices, which are fixed, appearing cheaper than the pre-tax price of a taxi. This was seen as libel and Blacklane was given the chance to remove such comparisons or face either paying up to 250,000 euros in fines or having to cease operations for up to 6 months.

=== The Smart regulatory allowance 2014 ===
Blacklane caused a stir again in 2014 upon rolling out their Smart Class. A German law states that all taxis and limousines must have 2 doors on the right side of the vehicle. A Smart car has only one door on the right, but also only one door on the left. Taxi companies threatened to take action, accusing Blacklane of breaking the law by using Smart cars. Blacklane revealed in interviews, that they had requested and received special permission for the use of Smart cars before the launch as only one door on the right side sufficed when it came to the safety of a Smart car.

== Awards ==
At the European Tech5 Awards in March 2015, Blacklane was named the fastest growing tech startup in Germany. The company was an official contender for the title of Europe's fastest growing tech startup at The Next Web Conference in April 2015 in Amsterdam, however the award went to Amsterdam-based Fairphone. In April 2017, The German Stevie Awards recognized CEO and co-founder Jens Wohltorf as a Gold winner for "Manager of the Year -- Transport." Blacklane won a Silver for Company of the Year - Automotive, Transportation and Transport.

In 2018, Blacklane won further Stevie Awards for Corporate Social Responsibility Program of the Year (Bronze), Technological Innovation (Gold), and Transport Company of the Year (Gold). Lux Life Magazine also awarded Blacklane the award for Most Outstanding Luxury Chauffeur Service - New York at the Luxury Lifestyle Awards that same year.

In January 2019 Blacklane, won Best Ground Transportation Company at the Business Travel Awards in London.
