= Jutta Fleck =

German activist and survivor of the German Democratic Republic

- Born: 1946 (age 78–79); Dresden
- Other names: Jutta Gallus "The Woman from Checkpoint Charlie"
- Occupation: Computer scientist
- Known for: Attempted escape to West Germany and public demonstrations for the release of her daughters from East Germany

Jutta Fleck (born 1946) is an attempted escapee and former political prisoner of the Socialist Unity Party of Germany. She is known as "The Woman from Checkpoint Charlie". Following a failed attempt to escape from the German Democratic Republic (GDR) with her daughters in August 1982, she was imprisoned in Hoheneck Women's Prison and, after being deported to West Germany, spent four years protesting for her daughters' release from East Germany.

== Biography ==
Jutta Fleck was born in Dresden in 1946. She was known as Jutta Gallus by her first marriage. She worked as a computer scientist. After divorcing her husband, she had sole custody of her daughters, Claudia and Beate Gallus. Following her mother's death, Fleck became dissatisfied with the restrictions of living in East Germany and decided to flee with her two daughters.

=== Attempted escape and imprisonment ===
In August 1982, Jutta Fleck attempted to escape from East Germany with her two daughters and the help of a smuggler. Using West German passports, they planned to make their escape route from the Romanian town of Severin across the Danube to Yugoslavia, and then continue to Bad Oeynhausen. This plan was thwarted when Fleck's money and documents were stolen. On 25 August, Fleck attempted to emigrate using a passport issued by the Bucharest Embassy of the Federal Republic of Germany. The Romanian official who was responsible for issuing the exit visa had become suspicious. The Securitate, the Romanian secret police, arrested them and interrogated them at the airport. Fleck asked a stewardess to call her uncle who was living in West Germany, so that the West German authorities could be informed. On 2 September 1982, they were boarded onto an Interflug aeroplane with ten Stasi officials and flown back to the German Democratic Republic. Upon arrival at Schönefeld Airport, Fleck was immediately separated from her daughters without being allowed to say goodbye. Fleck was held in custody for one day at the Ministry for State Security in Berlin, then transferred to the Stasi detention center on Bautzner Strasse in Dresden. It took a four-month wait before a verdict was reached at a hearing on 4 January 1983. Fleck was sentenced to serve three years in Hoheneck Women's Prison for attempting to escape from the republic, where she was twice placed in isolation. After about two years, she was freed by the Western authorities through the Federal Ministry for Inner-German Relations. Prior to her deportation to the Federal Republic of Germany, she was transferred with other prisoners in a camouflaged truck to Karl-Marx-Stadt on 17 February 1984 where she was held in detention. Although Fleck was bought out by Western authorities, the deal did not include her daughters, so Fleck began to write to politicians from West Germany to be reunited with her daughters.

=== Separation ===
Fleck spent six years separated from her two daughters. Her children were initially sent to a children's home near Dresden where their movement was restricted. The two girls were separated from each other and identified by a number rather than by their names. After a few months, their uncle was able to visit them. Their father was given custody of his daughters. He was a staunch supporter of the GDR and told them that Fleck was an enemy of the state. Beate Gallus stated that they were not allowed to make contact. The two children secretly exchanged letters with their mother.

=== Public demonstrations ===
Fleck began to make public demonstrations with the help of the International Society for Human Rights to demand for the German Democratic Republic to return her daughters. These demonstrations included standing for six months before the border guards at Checkpoint Charlie border crossing of the Berlin Wall. From 24 October 1984, she spent every day at the border crossing holding a sign that displayed the demand, "Give me back my children". This caught widespread media attention. The author Ines Veith based her book titled The Woman from Checkpoint Charlie on Fleck, who subsequently became widely known by the name in public. Her campaign also resulted in a meeting with foreign minister Hans-Dietrich Genscher, and an audience with John Paul II at St. Peter's Square in April 1985. Fleck demonstrated in front of the Conference on Security and Cooperation in Europe in Helsinki in August 1985 by chaining herself to a railing. She was warned about a potential assassination attempt at a press conference on a ship and consequently did not take part. At the 25th anniversary of the construction of the Berlin Wall, at the Reichstag on 13 August 1986, Fleck took an opportune moment to protest in front of a 1,500 live audience and television audience to call upon politicians to help end her separation from her daughters but received no response from chancellor Helmut Kohl.

=== Reunion ===
Claudia and Beate applied for exit visas with the help of German lawyer Wolfgang Vogel. Due to widespread media attention, Fleck's campaign was supported by Erich Honecker. She was reunited with her two daughters in West Berlin on 25 August 1988. She moved to Bavaria, remarried and settled in Wiesbaden with her husband and daughter Beate.

=== Later life ===
In 2009, Fleck was awarded the Order of Merit of the Federal Republic of Germany by President Horst Köhler. Fleck and her daughter Beate Gallus gave lectures at various locations, such as at the Bad Liebenzell Civic Center on 12 October 2019, to recount their experiences of life in the GDR.

== Related media ==
In 2006 a two-part television film titled Die Frau Vom Checkpoint Charlie was released, which was based on Jutta Fleck's life. The film was directed by Miguel Alexandre and starred Veronica Ferres.
