= Serenity (2019 film) =

2019 film directed by Steven Knight

- Theatrical release poster
- Directed by: Steven Knight
- Written by: Steven Knight
- Produced by: Greg Shapiro; Guy Heeley; Steven Knight
- Starring: Matthew McConaughey; Anne Hathaway; Diane Lane; Jason Clarke; Jeremy Strong; Djimon Hounsou
- Cinematography: Jess Hall
- Edited by: Laura Jennings
- Music by: Benjamin Wallfisch
- Production companies: Global Road Entertainment; Starlings Entertainment; Nebulastar; Shoebox Films
- Distributed by: Aviron Pictures
- Release date: January 25, 2019 (United States)
- Running time: 106 minutes
- Country: United States
- Language: English
- Budget: $25 million
- Box office: $14.4 million

Serenity is a 2019 American mystery thriller film written, produced and directed by Steven Knight. The film stars Matthew McConaughey, Anne Hathaway, Diane Lane, Jason Clarke, Djimon Hounsou, and Jeremy Strong, and follows a fishing boat captain who is approached by his ex-wife to murder her abusive new husband. First announced in January 2017, principal photography on the film began in Mauritius that July.

Serenity was released in the United States on January 25, 2019, by Aviron Pictures. Following poor test screenings, its distributor abruptly dropped its marketing efforts and the film was a critical and commercial failure.

== Plot ==
Baker Dill is a fishing boat captain living a quiet and sheltered life. He spends his days leading tours off a tranquil, tropical enclave called Plymouth Island and is obsessed with catching an evasive giant yellowfin tuna whom he calls "Justice."

One day, Dill's ex-wife Karen tracks him down and begs him to save her and their young son, Patrick, from her new, powerful but violently abusive husband Frank. She offers Dill $10 million to murder him by throwing him overboard. She tells him that Frank will be arriving later in the week and that they have booked Frank for a fishing trip, the perfect opportunity for Dill to kill Frank.

Torn between his conscience and his desire to help Karen, Dill is thrust back into a life he had tried to forget, as his world is plunged into a new reality that may not be all that it seems.

It soon becomes apparent that Dill is a character in a computer game Patrick created, based on his father, John Mason, a U.S. Marine Corps Captain who was killed in Iraq in 2006. Patrick had based the character on a memory of his father taking him fishing when he was three years old. When the widowed Karen remarried, Patrick introduced his mother and abusive step-father as new characters in the game, and changed Dill's task from catching tuna to murdering his step-father.

Dill soon begins to realize that he and the other inhabitants of Plymouth Island are merely artificial intelligence characters created by his son inside the pupil of his eye. Nevertheless, he decides to go along with the objective of killing Frank.

As Dill carries out the objective, Patrick summons up the courage to confront Frank in real life and stabs him in the chest with a knife that belonged to his father. Frank dies and Patrick is charged with murder, but he is released into his mother's custody while awaiting trial. He designs a new computer game in which he and his father are reunited.

== Cast ==
- Matthew McConaughey as John Mason/Baker Dill
- Anne Hathaway as Karen Zariakas
- Diane Lane as Constance
- Jason Clarke as Frank Zariakas
- Djimon Hounsou as Duke
- Jeremy Strong as Reid Miller
- Garion Dowds as Samson
- Charlotte Butler as Lois
- David Butler as Jack
- Rafael Sayegh as Patrick Zariakas

Hathaway stated she was attracted to playing Karen because the character puts up a "mask" defined by the "male gaze", and also that she was not usually asked to play these kinds of characters.

== Production ==
On January 28, 2017, it was announced that Matthew McConaughey and Anne Hathaway would star in a "sexy noir" film, Serenity, which would be directed by Steven Knight from his own script. Greg Shapiro and Guy Heeley would produce the film through IM Global, which also financed. The production received a local government rebate of 30 percent. McConaughey and Hathaway hadn't acted together since Interstellar. On April 18, Jason Clarke joined the film to play Hathaway's character's wealthy, abusive husband. On May 10, 2017, more cast were announced, including Uma Thurman to play McConaughey's character's love interest (although Thurman soon removed herself from the production due to scheduling conflicts), and Djimon Hounsou for an unspecified role. By July 2017, confirmed cast included McConaughey, Hathaway, Clarke, Hounsou, Diane Lane (replacing Thurman), and Jeremy Strong.

Principal photography on the film began late-July 2017 in Mauritius. The film's production caused a scandal in the country, as Prime Minister Pravind Jugnauth was accused of having misappropriated funds in excess of 200 million Mauritian rupees (~US$6 million) to support the film.

== Release ==
In February 2018, Aviron Pictures acquired distribution rights to the film. The film was originally scheduled to be released on September 28, 2018, but was later pushed back to October 19, 2018, and then again to its actual release date: January 25, 2019. It was released on DVD and Blu-ray on April 30, 2019.

Following poor test screenings, the movie's distributor Aviron reportedly ceased its promotion and advertisement efforts. This came even after the film's stars agreed to a full campaign "including a junket and as many late-night and daytime talk shows as would have them." According to Deadline Hollywood, "maybe only nine spots aired in obscure locales and not in any time slots that would have helped create awareness for the film," and that the film's stars and director were misled about the amount of junket and late night interviews they would be able to participate in to promote the film. In response, Aviron said in a statement: "As much as we love this film and still hope it finds its audience, we tested and retested the film—with audiences and critics alike—and sadly, the data demonstrated that the film was not going to be able to perform at our initial expectations, so we adjusted our budget and marketing tactics accordingly." Some of the film's stars, such as McConaughey and Hathaway, were reportedly upset because Aviron pledged to put up a promotion and advertising campaign commensurate with a 2500-screen release.

Scott Mendelson, a writer for Forbes, defended Aviron's decision, stating "an original, R-rated, star-driven, sexually-explicit thriller from a small distributor, with poor reviews, a D+ from Cinemascore and (understandably) misleading marketing is the very definition of DOA", concluding, "Aviron would merely have been burning money to spend any more on marketing Serenity than they already did".

== Reception ==
=== Box office ===
Serenity grossed $8.5 million in the United States and Canada, and $5.8 million in other territories, for a total worldwide gross of $14.4 million, plus $1.4 million with home video sales, against a production budget of $25 million.

In the United States and Canada, Serenity was released alongside The Kid Who Would Be King, and was initially projected to gross around $7 million from 2,561 theaters in its opening weekend. The film made $1.6 million on its first day, including $250,000 from Thursday night previews, lowering estimates to $4 million. It ended up debuting to $4.4 million, finishing eighth, and marking the worst wide release opening of Hathaway's career. In its second weekend, the film fell 62% to $1.7 million, finishing 14th.

=== Critical response ===
On review aggregator Rotten Tomatoes, the film holds an approval rating of 21% based on 199 reviews, and an average rating of 4.1/10. The website's critical consensus reads, "A high-concept mystery with a twist, Serenity isn't what it appears to be at first—unfortunately, it's also not anywhere near as clever or entertaining as it thinks." On Metacritic, the film has a weighted average score of 37 out of 100, based on 38 critics, indicating "generally unfavorable reviews". Audiences polled by CinemaScore gave the film an average grade of "D+" on an A+ to F scale, while those at PostTrak gave it an overall positive score of 56% and a recommend rating of 34%.

Christy Lemire of RogerEbert.com gave the film one star, calling it "terrible and insane" and writing: "Similar to Collateral Beauty and The Book of Henry—recent dramas with esteemed casts that went off the rails in enjoyably awful ways—Serenity is the kind of bonkers movie that truly must be seen to be believed". The Hollywood Reporter's Todd McCarthy wrote, "Actors can usually have fun with such melodramatic roles, but Knight's stratagems serve to straitjacket the cast more than liberate it to diminishing returns as the climax remains an elusive vision on the horizon. Like a long fishing day without a bite, Serenity invites impatience rather than excited anticipation, and the eventual payoff provokes a big 'huh?'" Several reviewers, including Vanity Fair and The Independent, criticized the plot twist.

In his review for The New York Observer, Rex Reed stated that "The new year is not even a month old, but a hunk of junk called Serenity already qualifies as the worst film of 2019" and that "[a]t the critics' screening I attended, the audience was reduced to hysterics". Michael O'Sullivan of The Washington Post wrote that "[t]he dialogue is bad, to the point of self-parody... The performances are cartoonish, especially that of Hathaway, whose femme fatale comes across as a kind of live-action Jessica Rabbit from Who Framed Roger Rabbit. And the scenario abounds with cliché and lazy shorthand." This view was shared by the New Yorker review, which cited the film as a mere collection of cliches that were assembled as a meta movie. In Rolling Stone, Peter Travers defined Serenity "like the bastard child of Body Heat and The Sixth Sense, minus the heat and the sense."

The movie ended up on several lists of worst movies of 2019, including Hollywood Reporter, The A.V. Club, Variety, and CBS News.

=== Accolades ===
The film was nominated for two Golden Raspberry Awards, Matthew McConaughey for Worst Actor and Anne Hathaway for Worst Actress (also for The Hustle).

== See also ==
- "Playtest", an episode of the TV series Black Mirror with a similar premise.
- Don't Worry Darling, a film with a similar premise.
