= Zero Contact =

- Theatrical release poster
- Directed by: Rick Dugdale
- Written by: Cam Cannon
- Produced by: Peter Toumasis; Rick Dugdale; Cam Cannon
- Starring: Anthony Hopkins; Chris Brochu; Aleks Paunovic; Veronica Ferres
- Cinematography: Edd Lukas
- Edited by: Håkan Karlsson
- Music by: Klas Wahl; Anders Niska
- Production companies: Enderby Entertainment; Grindstone Entertainment; People in the Park Postproduction
- Distributed by: Vuele (International); Lionsgate (United States)
- Release dates: September 24, 2021 (International); May 27, 2022 (United States)
- Running time: 97 minutes
- Country: United States
- Language: English

Zero Contact is a 2021 American thriller film directed by Rick Dugdale and starring Anthony Hopkins. It was the only feature film to be released via Vuele, a non-fungible token platform.

Zero Contact was released internationally on September 24, 2021, and was released in the United States on May 27, 2022, by Lionsgate.

== Cast ==
- Anthony Hopkins as Finley Hart
- Chris Brochu as Sam Hart
- Veronica Ferres as Veronica Schultz
- Aleks Paunovic as Trevor Williams
- Lilly Krug as Jamie Schultz
- TJ Kayama as Riku Matsuda
- Martin Stenmarck as Hakan Nordquist
- James C. Burns as Doug Mancini
- David Beatty as William
- Angella Kostic as Katherine Hart
- Tova Novotny as Host
- Rukiya Bernard as Taylor Williams
- Osman Aboubakr as Omar
- Adrian Holmes as Phil
- Linda Darlow as Rebecca
- Marcus West as Opposing Council

== Production ==
In May 2020, it was announced Enderby Entertainment would commence production on a thriller titled 92. The film was shot in 17 countries. It was filmed entirely virtually via Zoom and during the 2020 COVID-19 pandemic. In September 2021, the film's first official trailer officially revealed production details including: Peter Toumasis and Cam Cannon, served as producers alongside Dugdale; Edd Lukas served as cinematographer; and Håkan Karlsson served as editor. It also stated that People in the Park Productions is credited in post-production.

== Release ==
The film was released as an NFT via CurrencyWorks Inc.'s platform Vuele.

In January 2022, it was announced that Lions Gate Entertainment had acquired distribution rights via its subsidiary Grindstone Entertainment, with a scheduled release date in May 2022. Zero Contact was released on May 27, 2022.

=== Marketing ===
The first trailer was released online, in September 2021. It notably announced many of the production details on-screen. In May 2021, following Lionsgate's purchase of distribution rights, a new poster and trailer was released alongside the official announcement of the movie's official release date.

== Reception ==
The film has a 10% rating on Rotten Tomatoes based on 10 reviews.

Rich Cross of Starburst gave the film a positive review and wrote, "High-concept techno-thriller Zero Contact is the latest mainstream movie determined to make a virtue out of the necessity of the Covid lockdown." Frank Scheck of The Hollywood Reporter gave the film a negative review and wrote, "Let’s just say that 'The machine runs on dark matter reactor' is one of the script’s more coherent lines." Dennis Harvey of Variety gave the film a negative review, calling it "a steaming pile of nada."

== Future ==
In January 2022, it was announced that two sequels will be filmed back-to-back. Anthony Hopkins will reprise his role from the first movie, which was filmed remotely via Zoom. Director Rick Dugdale revealed that principal photography had already commenced, with the projects in various degrees of production. The collaborative development with Lionsgate is noted as being the first feature film to be produced on-location in Antarctica. The production crew worked alongside Sebastian Copeland and David Hatcher Childress to ensure safety in the extreme conditions of the frozen Tundra continent. The production will also take place in 14 other geographical locations.
