= Malou (film) =

2019 short film by Adi Wojaczek and Patrick Mölleken

- Film poster
- Directed by: Adi Wojaczek
- Screenplay by: Adi Wojaczek
- Produced by: Patrick Mölleken
- Starring: Veronica Ferres; Romina Küper; Charles Rettinghaus
- Cinematography: Stephan Fröhlich
- Edited by: Adi Wojaczek
- Music by: Adam Lukas
- Production company: Omertà Pictures
- Release date: July 19, 2019 (LA Shorts Fest)
- Running time: 15 minutes
- Country: Germany
- Language: German

Malou is a German 2019 social short film drama starring Romina Küper, Veronica Ferres and Charles Rettinghaus, directed by Adi Wojaczek and produced by Patrick Mölleken.

The film celebrated its world premiere on July 19, 2019, at the 23rd LA Shorts International Film Festival in Los Angeles and was screened at the TCL Chinese Theatre in Hollywood in August 2019 as part of the 15th HollyShorts Film Festival's official selection.

Malou has been selected as a finalist at the Oscar-qualifying 22nd Manhattan Short Film Festival 2019, prevailing against more than 1,250 submissions from 70 countries.

== Plot ==
Inspired by real events, the film tells the story of a young dancer facing discrimination. The young passionate dancer, Malou, is irresistible fighting for her dream of a career on the big stage. After years of struggle and rejection she suddenly receives her one chance at life – leading up to an unexpected reveal.

== Cast ==
- Romina Küper as Malou
- Veronica Ferres as Regina Vollmer
- Charles Rettinghaus as Prof. Josef Berns
- Matilda Herzog as Young Girl
- Patrick Mölleken as Michael
- Lilly Krug as Milena

== Production ==
Malou is a German film production that was shot in North Rhine-Westphalia, Germany. Among others the Folkwang University of the Arts in Essen-Werden as well as the Düsseldorfer Schauspielhaus served as its film sets.

== Awards & Film Festivals ==
- Official Selection – 7th Annual NoHo Cinefest 2020
- Official Selection – 1st Filmoramax International Film Festival 2020
- Official Selection – 21st Newport Beach Film Festival 2020
- Official Selection – 4th Cordillera International Film Festival 2020
- Official Selection – 12th Go Short - International Short Film Festival Nijmegen 2020
- Official Selection – 44th Cleveland International Film Festival (CIFF) 2020
- Official Selection – 10th Awareness Film Festival 2019
- Finalist – 22nd Manhattan Short Film Festival 2019
- Official Selection – 15th HollyShorts Film Festival 2019
- Official Selection – 23rd LA Shorts International Film Festival 2019
