= Casanova Variations =

2014 French film by Michael Sturminger

- Film poster
- Directed by: Michael Sturminger
- Screenplay by: Michael Sturminger; Markus Schleinzer
- Based on: Histoire de ma vie by Giacomo Casanova
- Produced by: Paulo Branco; Alexander Dumreicher-Ivanceanu; Bady Minck
- Starring: John Malkovich
- Cinematography: André Szankowski
- Edited by: Evi Romen
- Distributed by: Alfama Films
- Release date: September 22, 2014 (San Sebastian)
- Running time: 118 minutes
- Countries: France; Austria; Germany
- Languages: English; Italian

Casanova Variations is a 2014 French-Austrian-German fantasy historical musical drama film written and directed by Michael Sturminger and starring John Malkovich. It is based on a play with the same name from 2011 by Sturminger, which was shown at the Ronacher in Vienna and toured the globe, with Malkovich having played the same roles, and it is furthermore based on Histoire de ma vie by Giacomo Casanova, who is played by Malkovich. The film premiered in Vienna on 19 January 2015.

== Cast ==
- John Malkovich as Giacomo Casanova
- Veronica Ferres as Elisa
- Florian Boesch as Giacomo II
- Miah Persson as Elisa II
- Lola Naymark as Cecile
- Kerstin Avemo as Leonilda
- Tracy-Ann Oberman as Jessica
- Maria João Bastos as Lady Doctor
- Kate Lindsey as Belline
- Anna Prohaska as Caterina
- Barbara Hannigan as Sofia
- Topi Lehtipuu as Duke
- Fanny Ardant as Lucrecia
- Jonas Kaufmann as Count Branicki
