= Pay the Ghost =

2015 film by Uli Edel

- Theatrical release poster
- Directed by: Uli Edel
- Screenplay by: Dan Kay
- Based on: "Pay the Ghost" by Tim Lebbon
- Produced by: Nicolas Chartier; Craig J. Flores; Ian Levy; Patrick Newall
- Starring: Nicolas Cage; Sarah Wayne Callies; Veronica Ferres
- Cinematography: Sharone Meir
- Edited by: Jeff McEvoy
- Music by: Joseph LoDuca
- Production companies: Midnight Kitchen Productions; Voltage Pictures
- Distributed by: RLJ Entertainment
- Release date: September 25, 2015
- Running time: 94 minutes
- Country: United States
- Language: English

Pay the Ghost is a 2015 American supernatural horror film directed by Uli Edel. The screenplay was written by Dan Kay, based on a short story of the same name by Tim Lebbon. The film stars Nicolas Cage, Sarah Wayne Callies and Veronica Ferres. The film was released on September 25, 2015, by RLJ Entertainment.

== Plot ==
A professor, Mike Lawford frantically searches for his son Charlie, who was abducted during a Halloween carnival. As nearly a year goes by, Mike and his wife Kristen are still looking for Charlie and are starting to hear and see him reaching out to them from the other world. Mike sees Charlie on a passing bus but upon chasing the bus down and gaining access, Charlie is not there. He disembarks and notices spray painted on a building, "pay the ghost," the phrase Charlie uttered before vanishing. He enters the building and finds homeless people living there. Unearthly screams of a woman are heard and a blind homeless man calls for the others to mask their fires, explaining to Mike that the screams are heard every year before Halloween. Mike asks about the phrase and is taken to a wall with more of the same phrases written on it. Engrossed by the wall and the homeless man, he does not notice the wall behind him shift into another world and a demonic figure briefly appears behind him, then vanishes. The homeless man explains nothing but quickly tells Mike to leave.

Kristen later sees Charlie's scooter move on its own and calls him. Later that night while pouring wine, the power in Mike and Kristen's home goes out. Mike looks out the window to see three children appear and burned at the stake, then turns and sees his apartment crowded with figures of children standing lifeless and pale. They call Jane, a psychic, to investigate. Standing in Charlie's room, Jane senses nothing but then abruptly walks to the window, looks at the approaching storm and says, "It's here... it has all the children." Jane is then thrown against the wall and strangled before collapsing, burn scars all over her hands. A later autopsy shows her internal organs were burned to ash.

Later, Mike walks upstairs to Kristen's room and she addresses him with Charlie's voice, pleading for help and saying "She's coming, Dad. I'm scared." Mike walks closer and sees Kristen cutting herself. Cleaning the wound, they find a symbol, which leads them to a Celtic Halloween celebration. A participant explains that the children are burning dolls to pay the ghost, so they will not be taken. Their friend Hannah who was helping them by doing research calls Mike and says that on Halloween night of 1679, because of her Celtic worship, young widow Annie Sawquin living in early New York was burned alive with her three children by an angry mob of settlers suspecting her to be a witch. Annie takes revenge every year on Halloween, when the border between the spiritual world and the physical world dissolves for a short time. Since then, every Halloween, Annie's ghost takes three living children from their parents and puts them in an alternate world. The borders solidify until next Halloween and the children taken are able to reach out and be rescued. But if the children cannot escape this alternate world within the first year, they are stuck in this world forever.

After Mike and Kristen are injured in a taxi by a flock of black vultures, Hannah is thrown out of a window and killed by the malignant entity while trying to leave the institute. Mike returns to the same building and finds the blind homeless man again, he gives him his watch in exchange for helping him find Charlie. He shows Mike the hazy road and tells him that he has until Halloween ends at midnight, otherwise he will be trapped there forever. Mike arrives at Annie's cabin and goes down to the basement where he finds the souls of many children who were locked up over the centuries at Halloween time. Mike finally finds Charlie along with Mia Wen and Pablo, two other children that were also taken within the last year.

While Mike, Charlie, Mia and Pablo are escaping, the ghost of Annie appears as she has learned that they were attempting to escape. Annie tries to stop Mike from taking the three children away by trying to kill him. All of the other children's souls arrive to help him and they are able to kill Annie by surrounding her, unknowingly freeing themselves into the afterlife. Mike and the children manage to get out just as the portal closes. At dawn, Mike and Charlie finally make it home. While reuniting with Kristen, it is revealed that Charlie has no recollection of the time that he spent missing. Outside, a black vulture is seen flying away.

In a scene mid-credits, three black vultures appear surrounding Hannah's corpse and she awakens, possessed.

== Cast ==
- Nicolas Cage as Mike Lawford
- Sarah Wayne Callies as Kristen Lawford
- Veronica Ferres as Hannah
- Lyriq Bent as Detective Jordan Reynolds
- Lauren Beatty as Annie Sawquin
  - Kalie Hunter as Ghost Annie Sawquin
- Jack Fulton as Charlie Lawford
- Stephen McHattie as Blind Man
- Susannah Hoffmann as Jane
- Caroline Gillis as Priestess
- Janet Lo as Jai Wen
- Erin Boyes as Emily
- Leah Jung as Mia Wen
- Juan Carlos Velis as Officer Morales
- Alex Mallari Jr. as EMT
- Darren Frost as Ice Cream Vendor
- Matteo Ghazni as Pablo

== Production ==
On May 15, 2014, Nicolas Cage joined the cast. On August 25, 2014, Sarah Wayne Callies joined the cast. On September 5, 2014, Veronica Ferres joined the cast. On September 4, 2014, Lyriq Bent joined the cast. Principal photography began in September 2014 in Toronto, Canada.

== Release ==
On August 6, 2015, it was announced RLJ Entertainment had acquired distribution rights to the film and set a September 23, 2015, limited release and video on demand release date. The film was released on September 25, 2015, in a limited release and through video on demand.

== Reception ==
Pay the Ghost received negative reviews from critics. On the review aggregator website Rotten Tomatoes, 10% of 31 critics' reviews are positive, with an average rating of 3.7/10. The website's consensus reads: "Pay the Ghost takes a weak stab at supernatural horror, but ultimately, it's only viewers who will pay for watching this sloppily assembled picture." On Metacritic, the film has a score of 23 out of 100, based on 9 critic reviews, indicating "generally unfavorable reviews".

Andrew Barker of Variety wrote: "This somnolent supernatural thriller is a low-energy wash from start to finish." Brian Tallerico of Roger Ebert.com declared it a "new low" for Nicolas Cage and branded the movie a "lazy, boring retread of Insidious.
