= Jonas Alber =

German conductor and violinist (born 1969)

- Born: March 11, 1969 (age 56); Offenburg, West Germany
- Genres: Classical
- Years active: 1997–present
- Website: www.jonasalber.com

Jonas Alber (born March 11, 1969) is a German conductor and violinist based in Berlin. He was appointed general music director of the Staatstheater Braunschweig in 1998, becoming Germany’s youngest conductor to hold such a position at the time.

== Early life ==
Born in Offenburg, West Germany, Jonas Alber studied violin and conducting at the Hochschule für Musik Freiburg, where he was a student of Nicolas Chumachenco. He later attended the Universität für Musik und Darstellende Kunst in Vienna, where he studied conducting under Leopold Hager and Karl Österreicher, and qualified as a conductor. He was awarded the Herbert von Karajan Foundation scholarship in 1995.

== Staatstheater Braunschweig ==
Alber was named Kapellmeister at the Staatstheater Braunschweig in 1997 and his talent quickly gained attention. He was appointed general music director the following year, a position he held until 2007. Among his tenure’s highlights include his 1998 to 2002 production of Richard Wagner’s opera tetralogy, Der Ring des Nibelungen. Alber received international recognition for his premieres of Reigen, Wintermärchen and Julie by Philippe Boesmans, and of Mozart’s La Clemenza di Tito, with newly composed recitative texts by Manfred Trojahn, in 2006, the 250th anniversary of Mozart’s birth. He earned additional acclaim for his world premiere of Siegfried Matthus’ Cosima.

During his career at the Staatstheater Braunschweig, Alber was particularly known for his performances of newly composed and contemporary pieces, in addition to works by such neglected composers as Erich Wolfgang Korngold and Alexander von Zemlinsky.

== Guest conducting work ==
Following his work at the Staatstheater Braunschweig, Alber became known for his guest conducting appearances with leading orchestras and opera companies in Europe, Africa, Asia and Australasia, and at prestigious music festivals.

=== Europe ===
Alber has conducted the Armenian Philharmonic Orchestra, the BBC Symphony Orchestra, the Belgrade Philharmonic Orchestra, the Brussels Philharmonic Orchestra, the City of Birmingham Symphony Orchestra, the Flanders Symphony Orchestra, the Gran Canaria Philharmonic Orchestra, the Iceland Symphony Orchestra, the Kristiansand Symfoniorkester, the Orchestre National de Belgique, the Orchestre National de Lille, the Residentie Orkest of The Hague, the Symphony Orchestra of St. Gallen, the Tonkünstler Orchestra of Lower Austria, the Zagreb Philharmonic Orchestra and the Zurich Chamber Orchestra.

In Germany, he has performed with the Bavarian Radio Symphony Orchestra, the Bochum Symphony Orchestra, the Dresden Philharmonic, the Hamburg Symphony Orchestra, the Leipzig MDR Symphony Orchestra, the Rundfunk-Sinfonieorchester Saarbrücken and the WDR Symphony Orchestra Cologne.

In 2007, Alber conducted the world premiere of Benoît Mernier’s opera, Frühlings Erwachen, at the Théâtre Royal de la Monnaie in Brussels. The following year, he premiered Mats Larsson Gothe’s Poet and Prophetess at NorrlandsOperan in Sweden. In 2009, he led a new production of Mozart’s The Abduction from the Seraglio at the Teatro Colón in Buenos Aires, after which he returned to the Staatstheater Braunschweig for a new staging of Beethoven’s Fidelio. In 2010, he conducted Richard Wagner’s Das Rheingold and Götterdämmerung at the Semperoper in Dresden, and Richard Strauss’ Der Rosenkavalier at the Teatro Real in Madrid. In 2011, Alber conducted the Orquesta Sinfónica del Principado de Asturias in Handel's Messiah at the cathedral in Oviedo, Spain. He later conducted Mozart’s The Magic Flute at the Hamburgische Staatsoper in Germany.

Among his other operatic conducting performances include Tiefland by Eugen d’Albert; Peter Grimes by Benjamin Britten; The Makropulos Case by Leoš Janáček; Carmina Burana by Carl Orff; Notre Dame by Franz Schmidt; Der Schatzgräber by Franz Schreker; Der Kaiser von Atlantis by Viktor Ullmann; and Mona Lisa by Max von Schillings.

=== Africa ===
Alber has made guest appearances with the Cape Philharmonic Orchestra and the KZN Philharmonic Orchestra in South Africa. In 2008, he led the production of Mats Larsson Gothe’s Poet and Prophetess at the Cape Town Opera. Alber later returned to South Africa in summer 2011 to conduct the world premiere of Winnie the Opera by Bongani Ndodana-Breen, a work based on the life of Winnie Madikizela-Mandela, at the South African State Theatre in Pretoria.

=== Asia and Australasia ===
In 2007, Alber conducted the Auckland Philharmonia Orchestra in the production of Beethoven’s Fidelio. Two years later, he made his conducting debuts in China and Japan with the Guangzhou Symphony Orchestra and the Osaka Philharmonic Orchestra. In 2010, he conducted the Vietnam National Symphony Orchestra and the Berlin Philharmonic Choir in Hanoi for the Year of Germany opening, with a performance of Beethoven’s Symphony No. 9. He made his debut with the Wuhan Symphony Orchestra in China later that year.

=== Music festivals ===
Alber is a regular guest conductor at such festivals as the Flanders Festival in Belgium, the Kammeroper Schloss Rheinsberg opera festival in Germany, the Stellenbosch International Chamber Music Festival in South Africa, and the Festival de Laon, the Festival de Violoncelle de Beauvais and the Festival des Forêts in France.

== Musical collaborations ==
Alber has worked with soloists Radek Baborák, Isabelle Faust, Martin Fröst, Sol Gabetta, Natalia Gutman, Håkan Hardenberger, Shlomo Mintz, Igor Oistrach, Steven Osborne and Maxim Rysanov. Additionally, he has collaborated with such vocalists as Joyce DiDonato, Franz Hawlata, Hans-Peter König, Genia Kühmeier, Anne Schwanewilms and Iris Vermillion.

== Awards and honors ==
- 2008: Diapason d’Or for his recording of Benoît Mernier’s Frühlings Erwachen

== Discography ==
- 1999: Jean Sibelius, Symphony No. 2 D major, Finlandia, released by Classiconcert
- 2000: Robert Schumann, Symphonies Nos. 2 and 3, released by Classiconcert
- 2001: Robert Schumann, Symphonies Nos. 1 and 4, Manfred, released by Classiconcert
- 2001: Felix Mendelssohn, Symphony No. 3 A minor, The Hebrides; Richard Strauss: Macbeth, released by Classiconcert
- 2001: Antonín Dvořák, Complete Works for Violin and Orchestra, released by Confido
- 2002: Johannes Brahms, Concerto for Violin and Violoncello A minor, released by Confido
- 2004: César Franck, Symphony D minor, Le chasseur maudit, released by Coviello Classics
- 2004: Gustav Mahler, Symphony No. 3 D minor, released by Coviello Classics
- 2005: Gustav Mahler, Symphony No. 2 C minor, released by GENIUN Musikproduktion
- 2007: Richard Strauss, An Alpine Symphony, released by Coviello Classics
- 2007: Benoit Mernier, Frühlings Erwachen, Opera in 3 acts, released by Cypres Records
- 2008: Richard Strauss, A Hero's Life, Death and Transfiguration, released by Coviello Classics
- 2008: Sergei Rachmaninoff, Piano Concerto No. 3 D minor, released by Linear Art Transfer

== Recording labels ==
- Classiconcert
- Confido
- Coviello Classics
- Cypres Records
- GENUIN Musikproduktion
- Linear Art Transfer
