= April X =

- Theatrical release poster
- Directed by: Michel K. Parandi
- Screenplay by: Michel K. Parandi; Jack Coulton
- Produced by: Lavinia Postolache
- Starring: Connor Storrie; Lilly Krug
- Cinematography: Nathan Haugaard
- Edited by: Hugo Caruana
- Music by: Matthew Atticus Berger
- Distributed by: Vertigo Releasing (United Kingdom); Sunrise Films / Rialto Distribution (North America)
- Running time: 92 minutes
- Countries: United States; Romania
- Language: English

April X is a 2025 science fiction thriller film directed by Michel K. Parandi and written by Parandi and Jack Coulton. It stars Connor Storrie and Lilly Krug as twins Bax and April. The film was shot on location in Bucharest, Romania, and is Parandi's feature directorial debut.

The film was a finalist in the New American Cinema Competition at the 2026 Seattle International Film Festival. It had its UK premiere on 17 June 2026 as the opening gala film of the 34th Raindance Film Festival. Vertigo Releasing released the film theatrically in the United Kingdom on 18 September 2026. It was given a limited United States theatrical release through Sunrise Films and Rialto Distribution on 2 October 2026.

== Plot ==
Twins Bax and April live together and record their dreams onto discs. Both conceal how they earn money: Bax traffics human organs, while April, currently selling wigs made of her hair, considers selling recordings of her dreams to gangster Sergei Tetris. After Bax falls into debt, April disappears. As he works off his debt, Bax searches the city for any trace of her, becoming increasingly consumed by the effort to find her.

== Cast ==
- Connor Storrie as Bax
- Lilly Krug as April
- Tudor Chirilă as Tetris
- Șerban Pavlu as Klein
- Tourialay Akbari as Ronny
- Iulian Postelnicu as Adrian
- Berite Labelle as Gaby
- Marius Chivu as The Bear
- Lavinia Postolache as Rose

== Production ==
Michel K. Parandi directed April X from a screenplay he co-wrote with Jack Coulton. Connor Storrie was cast as Bax early in the audition process. In a 2026 interview with Variety, Parandi said that the producers had encouraged him to continue auditioning actors for the role, but that he became convinced early on that Storrie was the right choice. Storrie was cast before his later breakthrough in the television series Heated Rivalry. Lilly Krug was cast opposite him as April.

The film was shot on location in Bucharest, Romania. Hugo Caruana edited the film and Matthew Atticus Berger composed the score.

== Release ==
April X screened at the Rhode Island International Film Festival in 2025, where it received first prize in the festival's Vortex Sci-Fi, Fantasy & Horror feature category.

The film screened at the Seattle International Film Festival in May 2026 as a finalist in its New American Cinema Competition. It had its UK premiere on 17 June 2026 as the opening gala film of the 34th Raindance Film Festival at Vue West End in Leicester Square, London.

Vertigo Releasing released the film theatrically in the United Kingdom on 18 September 2026. The film was given a limited theatrical release in the United States on 2 October 2026 through Sunrise Films and Rialto Distribution.

== Reception ==
=== Critical response ===
On the review aggregator website Rotten Tomatoes, 19% of 16 critics' reviews are positive, with an average rating of 4/10.

Anne-Louise Fortune of Starburst praised the performances of Storrie and Krug and the film's visual atmosphere, while criticizing the number of underdeveloped plot strands and aspects of its world-building. Diya Gohil of Filmhounds praised the film's production design, atmosphere and central performances, particularly those of Storrie and Krug, but criticized the screenplay's world-building, dialogue and character development. Paul Risker of DMovies lauded the film's balance of darker science-fiction elements with its emotional focus, writing, "Beneath the sci-fi tropes, April X is a touching story about family, and the lengths one will go to for the ones we love." Rich Cline of Shadows on the Wall praised the film's grisly and menacing tone, while finding its simple and enigmatic approach to storytelling frustrating.

=== Accolades ===
Year	Award / festival	Category	Recipient	Result	Ref.
2025	Rhode Island International Film Festival	Vortex Sci-Fi, Fantasy & Horror Award (Feature) – First Prize		Won	
2025	Boise Film Festival	Best Narrative Feature		Won	
2026	Hollywood Reel Independent Film Festival	Best Thriller		Won	
2026	Seattle International Film Festival	New American Cinema Competition		Finalist	
2026	Raindance Film Festival	Best International Feature		Nominated	
2026	Raindance Film Festival	Best Debut Director	Michel K. Parandi	Nominated	
2026	Raindance Film Festival	Best Performance in a Debut Feature	Connor Storrie	Nominated	
