= Luis Prieto (director) =

Spanish film director and screenwriter (born 1970)

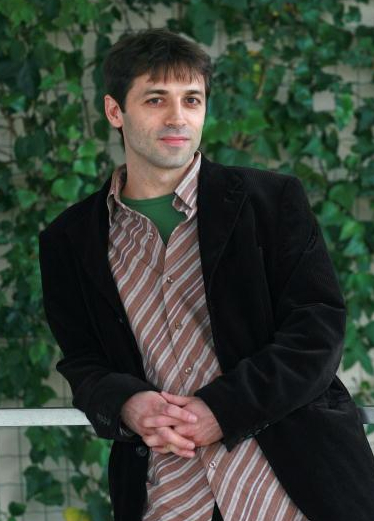
- Prieto in 2007
- Born: 10 July 1970 (age 56); Madrid, Spain
- Education: CalArts
- Occupations: Film director; screenwriter
- Writing career
- Period: 1994–present
- Genres: Action; thriller
- Notable works: Ho voglia di te "Bamboleho"
- Website: luisprieto.com

Luis Prieto (born 10 July 1970) is a Spanish-born film director and screenwriter.

== Early life ==
Prieto was born in Madrid, Spain. He studied economics and photography in Spain and film at the California Institute of the Arts in Los Angeles where he graduated in 1994 with honors from the School of Film and Video.

== Career ==
=== Early career ===
From 1994 and 1999 Prieto lived in Seattle, San Francisco and Los Angeles where he worked as an editor on short films, commercials and documentaries—including the 1994 Student Academy Award Nominee The Night Voice.

In 2001, Prieto directed the short film Bamboleho, which won over 45 international awards, including Best Short Film at the first edition of Robert De Niro's Tribeca Film Festival and a Special Jury Mention at the 2001 Venice Film Festival.

Condon Express, Prieto's feature film directorial debut, was filmed in 2004 in Buenos Aires, Argentina.

== Other projects ==
In 1999, Prieto worked as a video artist for musician Peter Gabriel in Real World Studios, Box, England.

== Filmography ==
=== Films ===
Year	Title	Director	Writer	Producer	Notes
2001	Bamboleho	Yes	Yes	No	Also editor
2003	Mariposas de Fuego	Yes	Yes	Executive	
2005	Condon Express	Yes	Yes	No	
2007	Ho voglia di te	Yes	No	No	
2009	Meno male che ci sei	Yes	No	No	
2012	Pusher	Yes	No	No	
2017	Kidnap	Yes	No	No	
2022	Shattered	Yes	No	Yes	
2024	Last Stop: Rocafort St.	Yes			

=== Television ===
Year	Title	Notes
2014	Z Nation	Director (episodes "Philly Feast", "Home Sweet Zombie")
2016	StartUp	Director (episodes "Proof of Concept", "Angel Investor", "Bootstrapped", "Valuation")
2016	Code Black	Director (episode 4 season 2)
2018	Snatch	Director (episodes "Haymaker", "Good Work for Good Money", "Close Quarters", "Job Done")
2020	White Lines	Director (episodes 3, 4 & 5)
