= Veronica Ferres =

German actress (born 1965)

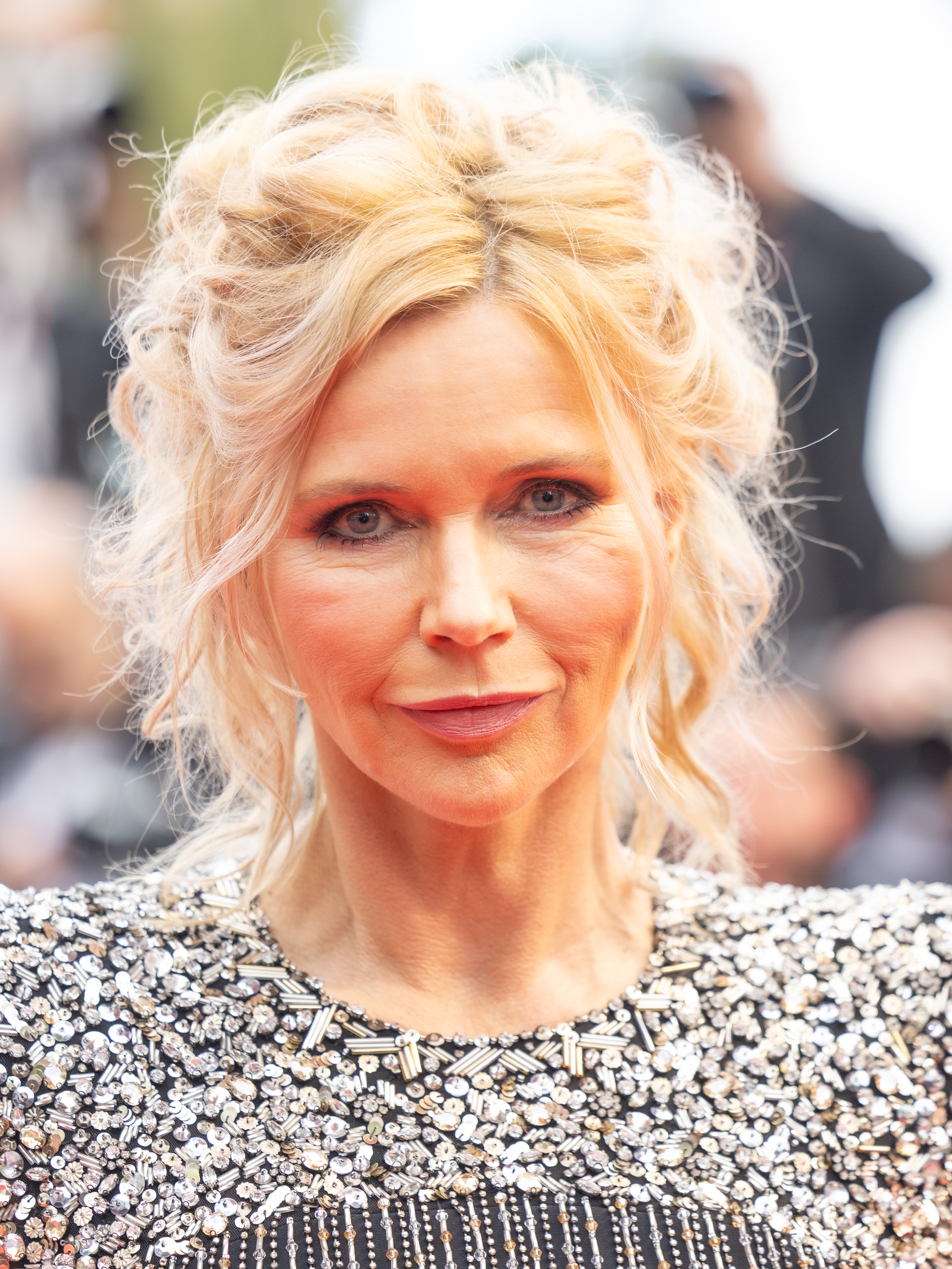
- Ferres at the 2025 Cannes Film Festival
- Born: Veronika Maria Cäcilia Ferres; 10 June 1965 (age 61); Solingen, West Germany
- Education: LMU Munich
- Occupation: Actress
- Years active: 1992–present
- Spouse(s): Martin Krug (m. 2001; div. 2010) Carsten Maschmeyer (m. 2014; sep. 2026)
- Children: Lilly Krug
- Awards: See Awards
- Website: veronicaferres.com

Veronika Maria Cäcilia Ferres (German pronunciation: [veˈʁoːnikaː ˈfɛʁɛs]; born 10 June 1965) colloquially Veronica Ferres is a German actress. Her 2007 portrayal of Sara Bender in Die Frau vom Checkpoint Charlie, based on the true story of Jutta Fleck, earned her the award for Best Actress at the Deutscher Fernsehpreis (German Television Awards).

== Early life ==
Ferres was born 10 June 1965 in Solingen, West Germany (presently Germany), the youngest of three children, to Peter Ferres (1930–2015), a coal and potato merchant, and Katharina Ferres (1934–2000).

She completed her Abitur at the Gymnasium Schwertstraße in Solingen, and then completed a German, theatre studies and psychology degree at LMU Munich.

== Career ==
In Germany, Ferres's breakthrough came with the title role in the 1996 comedy film The Superwife, followed by starring roles in films such as the Schtonk!, Rossini, Klimt (alongside John Malkovich) and Saviors in the Night, making her a household name in Germany. Her TV productions include The Manns, Destined to Witness, The Woman from Checkpoint Charlie, The Miracle of Berlin, Marco W. – 247 Days in a Turkish Prison, and She Deserved It, among others.

Her awards include the Grimme-Preis, the German Television Award, the Bavarian TV Award, the Golden Camera Award, and the Bambi Award. She played the female lead in Jedermann (Everyman), the traditional opening play of the Salzburg Festival, considered the highest honor in German stagecraft.

In 2013, Ferres shot the international feature Hector and the Search for Happiness with Simon Pegg and Jean Reno, and played the main role in the feature film Casanova Variations, again with John Malkovich. Her 13th international production, The Devil's Violinist, was released theatrically in late 2013. In 2015, she starred opposite Nicolas Cage in the thriller Pay the Ghost, directed by Uli Edel. In 2016, she had the leading role in Werner Herzog's film Salt and Fire, co-starring Michael Shannon and Gael García Bernal. Ferres also co-starred in The Comedian, her 17th English feature film, along with Robert De Niro, Leslie Mann, and Danny DeVito. She was able to display her comedic talent in the cinema comedies “DER NANNY” written and starring by Matthias Schweighöfer, Unter Deutschen Bettern and an episode of the hit series Jerks, among others.

The ARD feature film Meister Des Todes by Daniel Harrich even gathered political attention. The film, based on Harrich’s journalistic research into illegal arms exports, prompted several investigations against arms manufacturers in Germany. The second part Meister Des Todes 2 followed in 2020. The short film Malou by director Adi Wojaczek and producer Patrick Mölleken, premiered at the 23rd L.A. Shorts International Film Festival in Los Angeles. At the 22nd Manhattan Short Film Festival, it was on the Academy Award shortlist for 2020. In 2019 her filmography included Crisis with Gary Oldman and Luke Evans, the mystery thriller The Darker The Lake directed by Lok Kwan Woo and the romantic comedy Love, Weddings, and Other Disasters starring Diane Keaton and Jeremy Irons. Furthermore, she appeared in Best Sellers with Michael Caine and in Every Breath You Take with Casey Affleck, Michelle Monaghan, and Sam Claflin. In 2020, she starred in the thriller Zero Contact alongside Anthony Hopkins. In 2021, she shot Paradise Highway with Juliette Binoche and Morgan Freeman, which premiered at the Locarno Film Festival.

In 2022 she starred in the action thriller The Bricklayer alongside Aaron Eckhart and Nina Dobrev. Furthermore, Veronica played a leading role in the popular German television series Tatort in the episode “Königinnen” directed by Rudi Gaul.

The same year, she played in the new film adaptation of Robert E. Howard’s original Marvel comic “RED SONJA”, directed by M.J. Bassett the mother of Red Sonja as well as the Goddess Ashera alongside Mathila Lutz, Wallis Day and Robert Sheehan. Just recently she finished the english language streaming series El Turco in Budapest.

In 2023, Veronica Ferres is filming the American feature film Unholy Trinity directed by Richard Gray in Montana. She plays the female lead alongside Pierce Brosnan and Samuel L. Jackson.

She is also starring in the ZDFneo horror series Hameln, which is based on the legend of the Pied Piper of Hameln, and the ZDF comedy series Andere Eltern, directed by Lutz Heineking, jr.

Ferres founded her own production-company, Construction Film GmbH, in 2013.

== Personal life ==
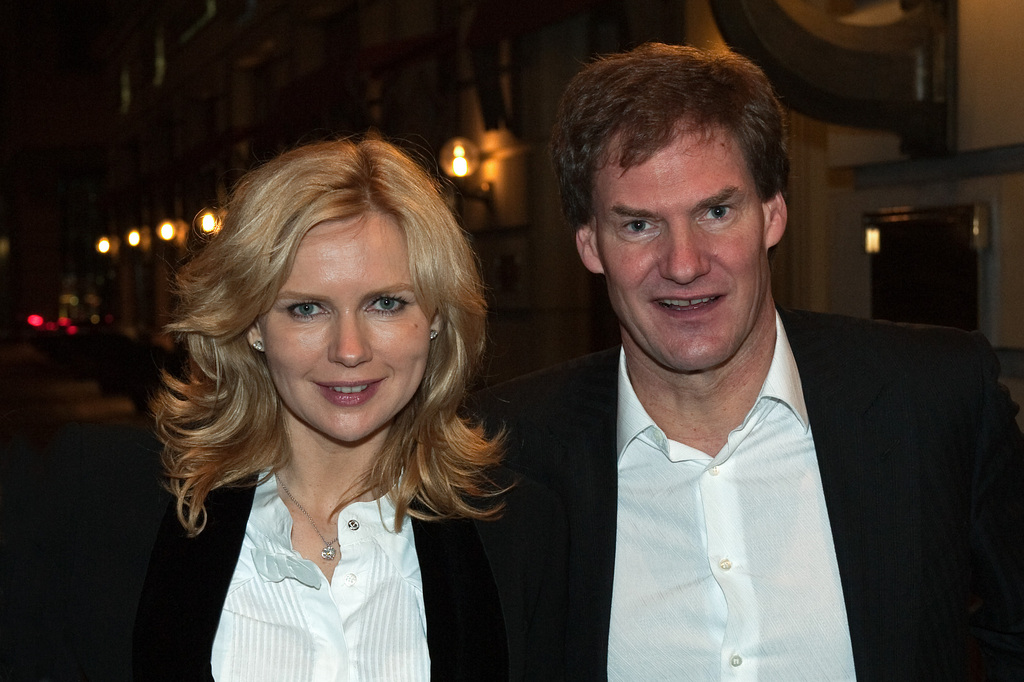
Ferres with Carsten Maschmeyer in 2010

Ferres was in a relationship with Helmut Dietl from 1990 to 1999. They collaborated on movies like Schtonk! (1991), Rossini (1997), Late Show (1999) and many others. In February 2000, they announced their separation. She has one daughter, Lilly Krug, with her ex-husband Martin Krug. The marriage lasted from 2001 until their divorce in 2010. In 2014, Ferres married Carsten Maschmeyer.

== Filmography ==
=== Television ===
Year	Title	Role	Notes
1983–1984	Büro, Büro	Kantinenwirtin Vroni	TV series
1985	Tatort: Schicki-Micki	Party guest (uncredited)	
1989	Tatort: Blutspur	Helma (uncredited)	
1989	Pyjama für Drei		TV series
1990	So wie wir sind		
1991	Der Castillo Coup	Debby	
1992	Die zweite Heimat (Leaving Home)	Dorli	2 episodes
1992	Der Bergdoktor: Der Fiedel-Joscha	Annemarie	
1993-1996	Unser Lehrer Doktor Specht	Anita Kufalt	29 episodes
1993	Ein Bayer auf Rügen	Anni	13 episodes
1993	Tatort: Alles Palermo	Maria Zell	
1993	Das Sahara-Projekt	Julia Dahlhaus	TV miniseries
1994	Peter und Paul	Dr. Ida Hundhammer	5 episodes
1994	Die skandalösen Frauen		
1994	Inspector Rex: Ein perfekter Mord	Gerda Felsner	
1994	Dr. Schwarz und Dr. Martin: Rosenkavaliere	Elisabeth	TV series Ärzte
1994	Tatort: … und die Musi spielt dazu	Nele Hinrichs	
1995	Fatale Mutterliebe	Ingrid	
1995	Tonino und Toinette		
1996	Der Bulle von Tölz: Unter Freunden	Elfriede Seidl	
1996	Catherine the Great	Vorontsova	
1997	Kowalsky	Veronika Jansen	5 episodes
1997	Die Chaos-Queen	Luise Schumann	
1997	Doktor Knock	Dr. Kai Richardi	Based on Doctor Knock
1998	Eine ungehorsame Frau	Marlene	
1999	Jack's Baby	Jacqueline	
2000	Les Misérables	Madame Thénardier	TV miniseries
2000	Sans famille	Johanna von Strauberg	
2001	Die Manns – Ein Jahrhundertroman	Nelly Mann	TV miniseries
2002	Bobby	Rosi Huber	
2003	Für immer verloren	Sabine Winter	
2003	Annas Heimkehr	Anna Schweighofer	
2004	Stärker als der Tod	Lena Koch	
2004	Die Rückkehr des Tanzlehrers	Veronica Molin	Based on The Return of the Dancing Master
2004	Sterne leuchten auch am Tag	Iris Hermann	
2005	Under the Dark Sun of Africa	Catherine Coburn	
2006	Destined to Witness	Bertha Baetz	Based on Destined to Witness
2007	Mein alter Freund Fritz	Lydia Seidel	
2007	End of the Ice Age	Lena Jörning	
2007	Die Frau vom Checkpoint Charlie	Sara Bender	
2008	The Miracle of Berlin	Hanna Kaiser	
2008	Die Patin – Kein Weg zurück	Katharina Almeda	TV miniseries
2010	Das Geheimnis der Wale	Anna Waldmann	
2010	She Deserved It	Nora Wagner	
2010	Rosannas Tochter	Nela	
2010	Das blaue Licht	Witch	Based on The Blue Light
2011	Marco W. – 247 Tage im türkischen Gefängnis	Martina Weiss	
2011	My Own Flesh and Blood	Franziska	
2012	The Long Wave After the Keel	Sylva Burian	
2012	Tsunami – Das Leben danach	Billi Cramer	
2012–2016	Lena Fauch	Lena Fauch	4 episodes
2012	Little Lady	Dolores Hobbs	Based on Little Lord Fauntleroy
2013	Mein Mann, ein Mörder	Minette Frei	
2013	The Hong Kong Affair	Victoria Philips	
2014	Das Glück der Anderen	Ellen König	
2014	Die Staatsaffäre	Chancellor Anna Bremer	
2015	Master of Death	Sabine Stengele	
2018	Im Wald – Ein Taunuskrimi	Inka Hansen	TV series Der Taunuskrimi
2018	Liebe auf den ersten Trick	Annabel	
2018	Unzertrennlich nach Verona	Ulla Biggemann	
2019	Berlin Station: Book of the Fallen	Suzanne Berg	
2019	Meister des Todes	Daniel Harrich	
2022	Tatort: Königinnen	Rudi Gaul	
2022-2023	EL TURCO	Uluç Bayraktar	
2023	Hameln	Rainer Matsutani	
2023	Andere Eltern	Lutz Heineking Jr.	
2026	Kacken an der Havel	Veronica Ferres	

=== Film ===
Year	Title	Role	Language	Director	Notes
1985	Der Unsichtbare	Schaffnerin (uncredited)	German	Ulf Miehe	
1988	The Vulture Wally	Magd	German	Walter Bockmayer	
1991	Babylon	Apothekerin	German	Ralf Huettner	
1992	Schtonk!	Martha	German	Helmut Dietl	
1992	The Parrot	Helga	German	Ralf Huettner	
1994	Voll normaaal	Carmen Krause	German	Ralf Huettner	
1996	The Superwife	Franziska Herr-Gross	German	Sönke Wortmann	
1996	Honigmond	Barbara	German	Gabriel Barylli	
1997	Rossini	Schneewittchen	German	Helmut Dietl	
1999	Late Show	Maria Keller	German	Helmut Dietl	
1999	Die Braut	Christiane Vulpius	German	Egon Günther	
1999	Ladies Room	Lauren	English	Gabriella Cristiani	
2006	Wild Chicks	Sibylle	German	Vivian Naefe	Based on the Wild Chicks books
2006	Bye Bye Harry!	Sophie	English	Robert Young	
2006	Klimt	"Midi" (Emilie Flöge)	English	Raúl Ruiz	
2007	Wild Chicks in Love	Sibylle	German	Vivian Naefe	Based on the Wild Chicks books
2008	Adam Resurrected	Frau Fogel	English	Paul Schrader	
2009	The Wild Chicks and Life	Sibylle	German	Vivian Naefe	Based on the Wild Chicks books
2009	Saviors in the Night	Marga Spiegel	German	Ludi Boeken	
2010	Life Is Too Long	Natasha Miesbach-Boronowski	German	Dani Levy	
2013	Ruby Red	Grace Shepherd	German	Felix Fuchssteiner	Based on the Ruby Red Trilogy
2013	King Ordinary	Sabine Müller	German	David Dietl	
2013	The Devil's Violinist	Elizabeth Wells	English	Bernard Rose	
2014	Sapphire Blue	Grace Shepherd	German	Felix Fuchssteiner, Katharina Schöde	Based on the Ruby Red Trilogy
2014	Hector and the Search for Happiness	Anjali	English	Peter Chelsom	
2014	Casanova Variations	Elisa	English	Michael Sturminger	
2015	The Manny	Ilona	German	Matthias Schweighöfer	Cameo
2015	Pay the Ghost	Hannah	English	Uli Edel	
2016	Short Term Memory Loss (a.k.a. Tod auf Raten)	Annett Gräber	German	Andreas Arnstedt	
2016	The Comedian	Karola	English	Taylor Hackford	
2016	Salt and Fire	Dr. Laura Sommerfeld	English	Werner Herzog	
2017	Unter deutschen Betten	Linda Lehmann	German	Jan Fehse	
2018	Siberia	Raisa	English	Matthew Ross	
2018	Intrigo: Death of an Author	Kerr	English	Daniel Alfredson	
2018	Head Full of Honey	Woman on the train	English	Til Schweiger	Cameo
2019	Berlin, I Love You	Else Speck	English	Anthology film by 11 directors	
2019	Malou	Regina Vollmer	German	Adi Wojaczek	
2020	Love, Weddings & Other Disasters	Bev	English	Dennis Dugan	
2021	Crisis	Meg Holmes	English	Nicholas Jarecki	
2021	Every Breath You Take	Dr. Vanessa Fanning	English	Vaughn Stein	Also producer
2021	The Unforgivable	—N/a	English	Nora Fingscheidt	Producer
2021	Best Sellers	Drew Davis	English	Lina Roessler	
2022	Paradise Highway	Rose	English	Anna Gutto	
2022	Zero Contact	Veronika Schultz	English	Rick Dugdale	
2024	The Bricklayer	Greta Becker	English	Renny Harlin	
2024	The Unholy Trinity	Sarah	English	Richard Gray	
2025	Red Sonja	Ashera and Mother of Red Sonja	English	M. J. Bassett	

== Awards ==
- 2024: Bavarian Film Award, Honorary Award of the Bavarian Minister President
- 2021: Inspiring Youth Award, TV Series Festival in Berlin for national and international movie success
- 2020: Kitzbühel Filmfestival, Honorary award
- 2019: Bavarian Europe Medal, award for special services to the Free State of Bavaria in Europe and the world
- 2018: ST. George Order for artistic achievements and charitable commitment
- 2017: 10th Maler Media Prize for Human Rights, awarded by Amnesty International for the film Master of Death
- 2013: Hadassah-Award "Citizen of the World" for longstanding engagement for Hadassah
- 2013: Cinema for Peace Award against anti-Semitism and hatred of foreigners
- 2013: Oldenburg Film Festival - Star of Excellence - Walk of Fame
- 2011: Boston Jewish Film Festival - Saviors in the Night - Winner of Audience Award
- 2011: Premio Bacco
- 2010: SIGNIS Award at the International Film Festival DC in Washington for Saviors in the Night
- 2009: Steiger Award in the category Film
- 2008: Jupiter in the category Best TV-production for Die Frau vom Checkpoint Charlie
- 2008: Deutscher Fernsehpreis in the category Best actress for Die Frau vom Checkpoint Charlie
- 2007: "Hans-Rosenthal-Ehrenpreis" for her encouragement for her charity project "Power-Child"
- 2007: Book of the Month - The book No, I don't go with strangers! was chosen as "Book of the month" of March 2007 by the "Deutsche Akademie für Kinder-und Jugendliteratur e.V."
- 2007: "Bad Iburger" Children's Literary PrizeE for her book No, I don't go with strangers!
- 2006: "Bavarian Merit Award" for her extraordinary achievements and dedication for Bavaria
- 2006: "Goldene Feder" Award, best actress
- 2005: Best Actress Award "Bambi" in Germany for her excellent career in movies, on television and on stage
- 2005: "DIVA - HALL OF FAME - German Award"
- 2004: "Bavarian TV Award" for Anna's Return, Forever Lost and Stronger than Death
- 2002: EMMY - Best film/serial for The Manns
- 2002: "Golden Grimme" Award for The Manns
- 2002: "Golden Camera" Award, best actress of feature film and TV movie in Germany
- 2002: "Bavarian TV" Award for The Manns
- 2002: "ROMY" Award, most popular actress in Austria
- 1999: Abruzzo Filmfestival, best actress
- 1999: Best Actress Award for The Bride, 9th International Film-Festival, Pescara, Italy
- 1998: "Golden Camera" Award, best actress of feature film and TV movie in Germany for Rossini
- 1997: SPA Award, Beauty Award
- 1992: Best Actress Award "Bambi" in Germany for Schtonk

== Nominations ==
- 2009: German Television Award - Best mini-series for The Godmother
- 2008: German Television Award - Best TV-movie for The Woman from Checkpoint Charlie and The Miracle of Berlin
- 2008: Emmy - TV-movie for The Miracle of Berlin
- 2008: Festival in Canada/BANFF - Best foreign language film for The Woman from Checkpoint Charlie
- 2007: German Television Award for best actress in a leading role and best TV-movie Snow in December
- 2007: Goldene Henne Award for best actress
- 2007: Golden Camera Award - Best German TV-movie for Destined to witness
- 2007: Bambi - For the TV-event of the year 2007 for The Woman from Checkpoint Charlie
- 1998: Adolf Grimme Award for her role in The Naughty Woman and in The Chaos Queen
- 1998: Tele Star - Best actress in a movie made for TV – The Naughty Woman
- 1992: Oscar - Best foreign language film for Schtonk (role: Martha)
