= Michel K. Parandi =

Film director

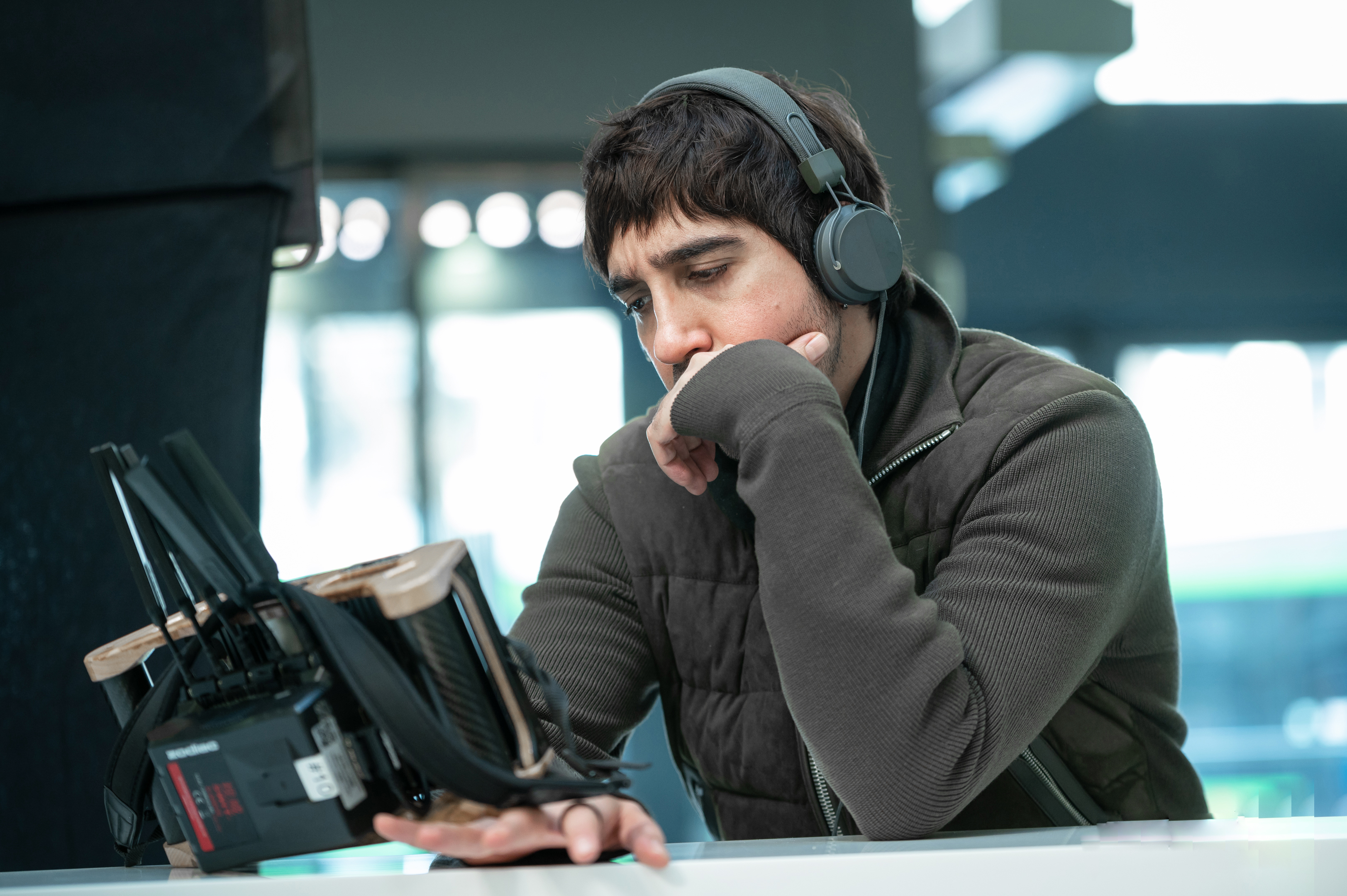
- Parandi on the set of April X
- Occupations: Film director, producer, screenwriter
- Years active: 2005–present
- Website: parandiverse.com

Michel K. Parandi, also credited as K-Michel Parandi, is a filmmaker.

== Career ==
In 2005, he directed Midnight Wolf which was awarded by Moebius Jean Giraud a Sopadin Award at the Festival du Film de Paris. He is also known for having directed a series of designs presenting a futuristic Dubai for the biotechnology park DuBiotech— the short film From The Future With Love about police privatization. The proof of concept went viral and lead to a development series with HBO.

On November 8, 2021, Variety reported that Parandi, together with Interplay Entertainment Corp. APA, is developing the game Earthworm Jim into a television series.

Parandi’s psychological thriller April X, starring Connor Storrie and Lily Krug, will be released theatrically in the United States in September 2026.
