= Benoît Mernier =

Belgian organist and composer

Benoît Mernier (born 16 December 1964) is a Belgian classical organist and composer.

== Biography ==
Born in Bastogne, he was a student of Philippe Boesmans.

He is also professor of organ and improvisation at the Higher Institute of Music and Pedagogy in Namur.

His first opera Frühlings Erwachen after Frank Wedekind was premiered in 2007 at La Monnaie of Brussels then resumed in September 2008 at the Opéra national du Rhin in Strasbourg. His works are the subject of a series of discographic productions including a CD/DVD box set of Frühings erwachen (Cypres Records), which was awarded a Diapason d'or in 2009. His second opera La Dispute after the eponymous play by Marivaux was premiered on 5 March 2013 at La Monnaie.

Mernier premiered his first piano concerto at the opening of the 2008 "Festival de Wallonie" by French pianist Cédric Tiberghien with the Orchestre Philharmonique de Liège. It was later revived by David Lively and the Orchestre national de Montpellier Languedoc-Roussillon in 2014. In 2015, his first concerto for violin and orchestra - dedicated to the violinist Lorenzo Gatto - was premiered by the famous Belgian violinist and the National Orchestra of Belgium, at the Centre for Fine Arts, Brussels, in commemoration of the Great 1914-1918 War (concertos issued in 2016 by Cypres Records).

Mernier is a member of the Académie Royale de Belgique.
