= Krečič =

Krečič is a Slovene surname. Notable people with the surname include:

- Jela Krečič Žižek (born 1979), Slovene journalist
- Peter Krečič (born 1947), Slovene historian
