= A World Without Police =

2021 book by Geo Maher

A World Without Police: How Strong Communities Make Cops Obsolete
- Author: Geo Maher
- Language: English
- Genre: Politics, non-fiction
- Publisher: Verso Books
- Publication date: August 24, 2021
- Publication place: United States
- Media type: Hardcover
- ISBN: 9781839760075

A World Without Police is a book written by historian and political theorist Geo Maher focused on police abolition and what society may look like with a transition from traditional law enforcement agencies to community-based policing.

== Background ==
The author, Geo Maher, became interested in police abolition following the killing of Oscar Grant in 2009. Following the incident, Maher began to teach a course at Vassar College titled "Global Policing, Prisons and Abolition" while working as a visiting associate professor.

== Structure ==
In the first chapter, Maher discusses the Kenosha unrest shooting, writing that "self-deputized defenders of property and whiteness have almost always served as a brutal adjunct to the police", saying that American law enforcement agencies have been complicit in such behavior, including with border protection militias and lynch mobs. Citing W. E. B. Du Bois' Black Reconstruction in America where Du Bois wrote that poor white individuals served as a "special police force", Maher says that impoverished whites betrayed their class and oppressed African Americans during the Reconstruction era to maintain a feeling of superiority. Tracing the origins of law enforcement in the United States to the slave patrols and strike breaking groups, Maher states that "American policing has always been about two things at once ... racist fear and economic profit." With the latter, the author writes: "Police embodied the division of the poor and in their practical function they uphold that division every day, patrolling the boundaries of property and that most peculiar form of property that is whiteness."

Later, Maher writes that police in the United States have no legal obligation to protect the public, citing multiple federal court verdicts; in particular the author details how following the Parkland high school shooting, a court ruling determined that the local sheriff was not required to protect school students. He also examines data that shows that police in modern times does not prevent or reduce crime in a significant measurement, featuring a statement from David H. Bayley; "one of the best kept secrets of modern life ... police do not prevent crime." Regarding police reform, Maher notes that diversity in policing, police body cams and other initiatives have actually worsened police performance. Citing the Urban Institute, Maher says that "state and local spending on the police increased astronomically between 1977 and 2017, from $42 billion to $115 billion" without taking into account inflation and that over this period the militarization of police has increased.

Focusing on capitalism's relation to imperialism, the book delves into how United States policy forces individuals from their native nations and criminalizes them for illegal immigration. Maher writes that "the policing of imperial power has developed in conjunction with the domestic policing of colonized and formerly enslaved populations", criticizing the United States as a global policeman.

Finally, the book covers potential alternatives to traditional police forces. Maher suggests focusing on grassroots community safety groups, promoting restorative justice and funding after school programs. To achieve such an end to the established policing system, Maher says that an end of capitalism is required.

== Reception ==
Publishers Weekly describes A World Without Police as a "provocative and well-researched polemic", writing in conclusion that "[t]hough some readers will take issue with Maher’s fiery language, his ample evidence and firm convictions make a persuasive case. This is an essential introduction to the case for abolishing the police." In NPR, historian Kamil Ahsan writes that "Geo Maher's vision may not get readers to see past the horizon into a world without police—but it is as convincing as any book can be that we must at least try." Kirkus Reviews says that A World Without Police is "[a] thesis sure to stir plenty of controversy but worthy of discussion."

Christian Noakes of Workers World wrote that the book "is both one of the most compelling arguments for police abolition and a complete depiction of the nationwide George Floyd uprisings" and that it is bolstered "by extensive historical documentation and journalistic rigour."

== See also ==
- Beth Richie
- Michelle Alexander
- Ruth Wilson Gilmore
