= The Pervert's Guide to Cinema =

- Theatrical release poster
- Directed by: Sophie Fiennes
- Written by: Slavoj Žižek
- Produced by: Sophie Fiennes; Georg Misch; Martin Rosenbaum; Ralph Wieser
- Starring: Slavoj Žižek
- Cinematography: Remko Schnorr
- Edited by: Sophie Fiennes; Marek Kralovsky; Ethel Shepherd
- Music by: Brian Eno
- Production companies: Mischief Films; Amoeba Film
- Distributed by: P Guide Ltd. ICA Projects (UK)
- Release dates: 17 June 2006 (Sydney Film Festival); 16 January 2009 (United States)
- Running time: 150 minutes
- Countries: United Kingdom; Austria; Netherlands
- Language: English

The Pervert's Guide to Cinema is a 2006 documentary directed and produced by Sophie Fiennes, and scripted and presented by Slavoj Žižek. It explores a number of films from a psychoanalytic theoretical perspective.

Fiennes and Žižek released a follow-up, The Pervert's Guide to Ideology on 15 November 2012, with a similar format; Žižek speaks from within reconstructed scenes from films.

== List of films discussed ==
- Possessed (1931)
- Monkey Business (1931)
- Frankenstein (1931)
- City Lights (1931)
- Duck Soup (1933)
- The Testament of Dr. Mabuse (1933)
- Pluto's Judgement Day (1935)
- The Wizard of Oz (1939)
- The Great Dictator (1940)
- Saboteur (1942)
- Dead of Night (1945)
- The Red Shoes (1948)
- Kubanskie Kazaki (1949)
- Alice in Wonderland (1951)
- Rear Window (1954)
- To Catch a Thief (1955)
- The Ten Commandments (1956)
- Vertigo (1958)
- Ivan the Terrible: Part II (1958)
- North by Northwest (1959)
- Psycho (1960)
- The Birds (1963)
- Dr. Strangelove or: How I Learned to Stop Worrying and Love the Bomb (1964)
- Persona (1966)
- Solaris (1972)
- The Exorcist (1973)
- The Conversation (1974)
- Alien (1979)
- Stalker (1979)
- Dune (1984)
- Blue Velvet (1986)
- Wild at Heart (1990)
- Three Colors: Blue (1993)
- Lost Highway (1997)
- Alien: Resurrection (1997)
- The Matrix (1999)
- Fight Club (1999)
- Eyes Wide Shut (1999)
- Mulholland Drive (2001)
- The Piano Teacher (2001)
- In the Cut (2003)
- Dogville (2003)
- Star Wars: Episode III – Revenge of the Sith (2005)

== Reception ==
The Pervert's Guide to Cinema holds an 87% approval rating on Rotten Tomatoes, based on reviews from 23 critics.

== See also ==
- Examined Life
- Jacques Lacan
- Marx Reloaded
- Liebe Dein Symptom wie Dich selbst!
- The Pervert's Guide to Ideology
- The Reality of the Virtual
- Žižek!
