= The Reality of the Virtual =

- Directed by: Ben Wright
- Starring: Slavoj Žižek
- Release date: 2004
- Running time: 74 minutes
- Language: English

The Reality of the Virtual is a 2004 documentary film lecture by Slovenian philosopher Slavoj Žižek. Recorded in a single day by Ben Wright, the film consists of seven long takes of Žižek seated in front of a bookshelf. The discourse concerns the concept of "real effects produced, generated, by something which does not yet fully exist, which is not yet fully actual", with numerous examples from psychoanalysis, politics, sociology, physics and popular culture.

== See also ==
- Žižek!
- The Pervert's Guide to Cinema
- The Pervert's Guide to Ideology
- Liebe Dein Symptom wie Dich selbst!
- Examined Life
- Marx Reloaded
- Jacques Lacan
- Virtuality (philosophy)
