= The Pervert's Guide to Ideology =

- Theatrical release poster
- Directed by: Sophie Fiennes
- Written by: Slavoj Žižek
- Produced by: Sophie Fiennes; Katie Holly; Martin Rosenbaum; James Wilson
- Starring: Slavoj Žižek
- Cinematography: Remko Schnorr
- Edited by: Ethel Shepherd
- Music by: Magnus Fiennes
- Distributed by: P Guide Productions; Zeitgeist Films
- Release date: 7 September 2012 (Toronto)
- Running time: 136 minutes
- Country: United Kingdom
- Language: English

The Pervert's Guide to Ideology is a 2012 British documentary film directed by Sophie Fiennes and written and presented by Slovenian philosopher and psychoanalytic theorist Slavoj Žižek. It is a sequel to Fiennes's 2006 documentary The Pervert's Guide to Cinema. Though the film follows the frameworks of its predecessor, this film's emphasis is on ideology itself. Through psychoanalysis Žižek explores "the mechanisms that shape what we believe and how we behave." Among the films explored are Full Metal Jacket and Taxi Driver. The film was released in the United States by Zeitgeist Films in November 2013.

== Synopsis ==
Žižek appears transplanted into the scenes of various movies, exploring and exposing how they reinforce prevailing ideologies. As the ideologies undergirding cinematic fantasies are revealed, striking associations emerge: from nuns advising following your desires at The Sound of Music to the political dimensions of Jaws. Taxi Driver, Zabriskie Point, The Searchers, The Dark Knight, John Carpenter's They Live ("one of the forgotten masterpieces of the Hollywood Left"), Titanic, Kinder Surprise eggs, verité news footage, the emptiness of Beethoven's "Ode to Joy," and propaganda epics from Nazi Germany and Soviet Russia all inform Žižek's psychoanalytic-cinematic argument.

== Films discussed ==
- Triumph of the Will (1935)
- The Eternal Jew (1940)
- Brief Encounter (1945)
- The Fall of Berlin (1950)
- The Searchers (1956)
- West Side Story (1961)
- The Sound of Music (1965)
- Loves of a Blonde (1965)
- Seconds (1966)
- The Firemen's Ball (1967)
- Oratorio for Prague (1968)
- If.... (1969)
- MASH (1970)
- Zabriskie Point (1970)
- A Clockwork Orange (1971)
- Cabaret (1972)
- Jaws (1975)
- Taxi Driver (1976)
- Brazil (1985)
- Full Metal Jacket (1987)
- The Last Temptation of Christ (1988)
- They Live (1988)
- Titanic (1997)
- I Am Legend (2007)
- The Dark Knight (2008)

Additionally includes news footage of the September 11 attacks, 2011 Norway attacks, and 2011 England riots, concert footage of Rammstein, and excerpts from a Coca-Cola commercial.

== Awards ==
- 2012: Toronto International Film Festival, Official Selection

== Reception ==
"Though its ideas are indeed heady and high-flown, they are presented in a way that's consistently engaging and accessible. And the bearded, bulky, Slovenia-born Žižek comes across as a born raconteur and explainer, the kind of professor whose courses are deservedly his department's most popular. You don't have to share his materialist philosophy to find his analyses of culture and movies witty, insightful and usefully thought-provoking." —Godfrey Cheshire, RogerEbert.com

"What remains? You will get a lot of answers to questions you never knew you had." —Anne-Katrin Titze, Eye for Film

"Intellectual rock star Slavoj Žižek dishes out another action-packed lesson in film history and Marxist dialectics with The Pervert’s Guide to Ideology, a riveting and often hilarious demonstration of the Slovenian philosopher's uncanny ability to turn movies inside out and accepted notions on their head." —Jordan Mintzer, The Hollywood Reporter

"Žižek's romp through pop culture feels like a strange dream, with a mad professor re-enacting our favourite movie moments through the eyes of a therapist. The Pervert’s Guide to Ideology is invigorating, zany, completely memorable and often hilarious. Žižek goes from praising Coca-Cola to analyzing what the shark attacks really mean in Jaws." —Matthew Hays, Rover Arts Review

Rotten Tomatoes gives the film a score of 92 percent based on reviews from 24 critics.

== See also ==
- The Pervert's Guide to Cinema
- Žižek!
- The Reality of the Virtual
- Liebe Dein Symptom wie Dich selbst!
- Examined Life
- Marx Reloaded
- The Sublime Object of Ideology
