= Zizek! =

- DVD cover
- Directed by: Astra Taylor
- Produced by: Lawrence Konner
- Starring: Slavoj Žižek
- Cinematography: Jesse Epstein; Martina Radwan
- Edited by: Laura Hanna
- Music by: Jeremy Barnes
- Distributed by: Zeitgeist Films
- Release date: November 17, 2005
- Running time: 71 minutes
- Countries: United States; Canada
- Language: English
- Box office: $40,331 (Worldwide)

Zizek! or Žižek! is a 2005 documentary film directed by Astra Taylor. An international co-production of the United States and Canada, its subject is philosopher and psychoanalyst Slavoj Žižek, a prolific author and former candidate for the Presidency of Slovenia.

Zizek! premiered at the 2005 Toronto International Film Festival on September 11, 2005, and opened in one theatre in New York City on November 17. It eventually grossed $20,177 in the US and $20,154 in foreign markets for a total worldwide box office of $40,331.

== Critical reception ==
A. O. Scott of The New York Times observed, "Ms. Taylor, clearly thrilled by her proximity to her hero, seems incapable of the analytical distance that would provide insight into either his ideas or the cultural phenomenon he represents. On the basis of this film, it is hard to know whether Mr. Žižek's superstar status is merited, or to say what his cult says about the state of contemporary thought. Zizek! is entertaining without being especially illuminating."

In contrast, Paul Jaussen, writing for The Seattle School of Theology & Psychology's The Other Journal, noted that "Taylor and her crew … problematize [Žižek's international celebrity], moving back and forth between Žižek the icon and Žižek the philosopher". The fact that "like [with] every good celebrity, hype hides a certain void", then allows Žižek to draw attention to "a central tenet of his own intellectual project, a continuity of the great tradition of philosophy of the negative".

BBC's David Mattin judged the work "consistently amusing" in its "testimony to the great man's 24/7 brain" and "the next best thing … until Zizek is at a hall near you". As he put it, "Yes, there are flights into the intellectual upper atmosphere; but there's nothing of the 9am lecture about all this. Zizek's wildly energetic and unerringly strange personality makes for plenty of fun".

Eddie Cockrell of Variety called the film a "verbose profile" of Žižek containing "a lot of esoteric, eccentric theories, and little context within his globetrotting life."

Sean Axmaker of the Seattle Post-Intelligencer graded the film B and said it "attempts to put Žižek's philosophy into practical, accessible terms. Accessible, of course, being a relative term — key concepts are dropped through the film in snippets and sound bites that are gone before you've had a chance to really chew them over. You may not grasp his ideological philosophy, but you'll have a good time making the attempt."

Peter Bradshaw of The Guardian rated the film three out of five stars, adding he thought it "doesn't quite have the interest and focus of Sophie Fiennes' recent Žižek documentary, The Pervert's Guide to Cinema."

Jonathan Rosenbaum: "his frenetic and lucid manner is neatly captured by the jazzy style of director Astra Taylor."

== See also ==
- The Reality of the Virtual (2004)
- The Pervert's Guide to Cinema (2006)
- The Pervert's Guide to Ideology (2012)
- Liebe Dein Symptom wie Dich selbst! (1996)
- Examined Life (2008)
- Marx Reloaded (2011)
