= Stefan Gandler =

German philosopher

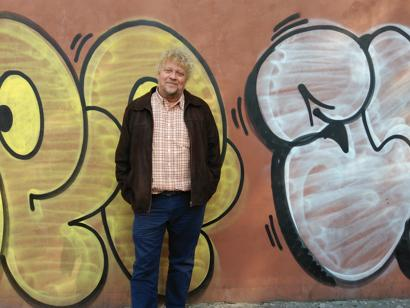
Stefan Gandler (2018)

Stefan Gandler (born 1964 in Munich) is a philosopher and social scientist. He studied at Frankfurt University and has lived in Mexico since 1993

== Life ==
Gandler studied Philosophy, Latin American studies, Romance Languages and Literatures and Political science in Frankfurt/Main, among others with Alfred Schmidt, and he was the Chairman of the Frankfurt General Students' Committee (AStA) in 1989/90.

1997 Stefan Gandler earned his doctorate with a study on Contemporary Social philosophy in Mexico, which has been translated in two languages. 1997 Gandler was tenured as professor for Social theory and Social Philosophy at the Universidad Autónoma de Querétaro (UAQ) and has this position until today, and since 2008 he is additionally permanent invited professor for philosophy at the Universidad Nacional Autónoma de México. Gandler is also, since 2001, member of the Sistema Nacional de Investigadores (category 3) and founded in 2012 the Research Project on Critical Theory from the Americas of the National Council of Science and Technology (CONACYT). Gandler is since 2007 chair of the academic group Modernity, development and region from the Mexican Federal Education Authority. (SEP) In his sabbatical years he researched und taught at the Universität Frankfurt am Main (2001/2002), the University of California, Santa Cruz (2009/2010), the Tulane University, New Orleans (2015/2016). and the Universität Innsbruck (2021/2022). The main research fields of Stefan Gandler are the Critical theory of the Frankfurt School, the critical western Marxism, philosophy in Latin America, Critique of ideology and Walter Benjamin. He worked also as translator of philosophical texts between Spanish and German and published texts on Today's Germany and the National Socialism. Gandler is working on a productive conceptual confrontation between the Critical theory of the Frankfurt School and its contemporary further developments in Latin America, for example from the Ecuadorian-Mexican philosopher Bolívar Echeverría, trying to overcome the limitations of both: the philosophical Eurocentrism in the first case, and the reduced Critique of ideology in the second.In that context he uses also the non dogmatic interpretation of the works of Karl Marx made by the Spanish-Mexican philosopher Adolfo Sánchez Vázquez, and that made by the Horkheimer-successor Alfred Schmidt.

In 2018 participes in the process for the election of the new director for the Institut für Sozialorschung in Frankfurt.

In 2021 Gandler received the Bolívar Echeverría Prize from the International Herbert Marcuse Society for his book Marxismo crítico en México. Adolfo Sánchez Vázquez y Bolívar Echeverría.

== Main works ==
=== Books ===
- Wolfgang Pohrt, Klaus Bittermann, Stefan Gandler et al., Gemeinsam sind wir unausstehlich. Die Wiedervereinigung und ihre Folgen. Berlin: Edition Tiamat, 1990. 159 pp. ISBN 3-923118-42-2 (2nd edition: 1992).
- Peripherer Marxismus. Kritische Theorie in Mexiko. Argument, Hamburg/ Berlin 1999, ISBN 3-88619-270-9, DNB 95744995X.
  - Spanish translation: Marxismo crítico en México. Adolfo Sánchez Vázquez y Bolívar Echeverría. Translated by Stefan Gandler, with the collaboration of Max Rojas and Marco Aurelio García Barrios. Pref. by Michael Löwy. México, Fondo de Cultura Económica / Universidad Nacional Autónoma de México / Universidad Autónoma de Querétaro, 2007, ISBN 978-968-16-8404-4. (2nd edition, updated, expanded and corrected. Pref. by Jorge Coelho Soares. México, Fondo de Cultura Económica / Universidad Autónoma de Querétaro, 2025, ISBN 978-607-16-8956-6. E-book edition ISBN 9786071628596).
  - English translation: Critical Marxism in Mexico. Adolfo Sánchez Vázquez and Bolívar Echeverría. Translated by George Ciccariello-Maher and Stefan Gandler. Pref. by Michael Löwy. Leiden/Boston: Brill, 2015, 467 pp. ISBN 978-90-04-22428-5. Softcover edition: Haymarket Books, Chicago, 2016. ISBN 978-1-60846-633-7.
  - Expanded and updated new edition of the German original: Kritischer Marxismus in Mexiko. Adolfo Sánchez Vázquez und Bolívar Echeverría. Zu Klampen, Lüneburg 2023, ISBN 978-3-86674-838-5.
- Materialismus und Messianismus. Zu Walter Benjamins Thesen "Über den Begriff der Geschichte". Bielefeld, Aisthesis, 2008, ISBN 978-3-89528-695-7.
- Fragmentos de Frankfurt. Ensayos sobre la Teoría crítica. Siglo XXI Editores, México 2009, ISBN 978-607-03-0070-7. (2nd edition, updated, expanded and corrected. Siglo XXI Editores, México 2025 ISBN 978-607-03-1557-2).
  - German translation: Frankfurter Fragmente. Essays zur kritischen Theorie. Translated by Dorothea Hemmerling, Stefan Gandler. Frankfurt am Main: Lang, 2013, ISBN 978-3-631-63400-4.
- Patricia Palacios Sierra, Alfonso Serna Jiménez, Stefan Gandler, Modernidad y diferencia. Reflexiones conceptuales y estudios empíricos en género y territorio. México: Porrúa, 2010, ISBN 978-6-07-401243-9.
- El discreto encanto de la modernidad. Ideologías contemporáneas y su crítica. Siglo XXI Editores / Universidad Autónoma de Querétaro, México 2013, ISBN 978-607-03-0479-8.
  - German translation: Der diskrete Charme der Moderne. Zeitgenössische Ideologien und ihre Kritik. Translated by Stefan Gandler. Pref. by Michael Löwy. Münster, Lit-Verlag, 2020, ISBN 978-3-643-14743-1.
- Teoría crítica: imposible resignarse. Pesadillas de represión y aventuras de emancipación. (Ed.) Miguel Ángel Porrúa / Universidad Autónoma de Querétaro, México 2016, ISBN 978-607-524-029-9.
- Teoría crítica desde las Américas. (Ed.) Miguel Ángel Porrúa / Universidad Autónoma de Querétaro, México 2021, ISBN 978-607-524-444-0.

=== Essays ===
- Tesis sobre diferencia e identidad. In: Dialéctica. Revista de la Benemérita Universidad Autónoma de Puebla. Puebla, year 23, no. 32, spring 1999, pp. 109–116. ISSN 0185-7770.
  - English translation: Difference and identity. In: Lo Straniero. Journal of IMISE, Naples, year 14, no. 29, May 1999, pp. 16–18. ISSN 1123-8542.
  - Italian translation: Dialettica dell'identità. Translated by Nunzia Augeri. In: Marxismo oggi. Rivista quadrimestrale di cultura e politica. Milano: Teti Editore, Jan.-April 2006, no. 1, pp. 48–57. ISSN 0393-3741.
  - Turkish translation: Kimlik diyalektiği. Translated by Denize Kanit. In: Felsefelogos, Bulut Yayınevi, Istanbul, year 10, no. 30/31, 2006-2/3, pp. 321–326. ISBN 975-286-219-5.
- Mestizaje cultural y ethos barroco. Una reflexión intercultural a partir de Bolívar Echeverría. In: Itinerarios. Revista de estudios lingüísticos, literarios, históricos y antropológicos, Warsaw: University of Warsaw, Instituto de Estudios Ibéricos e Iberoamericanos, no. 4, 2001, pp. 77–98. ISSN 1507-7241.
  - German translation: Zum Ethos-Begriff in der heutigen lateinamerikanischen Philosophie. In: Deutsche Zeitschrift für Philosophie. Berlin: Akademie-Verlag, November 2006, year 54, no. 5, pp. 767–783. ISSN 0012-1045.
- ¿Por qué el Ángel de la Historia mira hacia atrás? In: Utopía y Praxis Latinoamericana. Revista internacional de Filosofía Iberoamericana y Teoría Social, Maracaibo, Venezuela Universidad del Zulia, año 8, númº20, enero-marzo 2003, pp. 7–39. ISSN 1316-5216.
  - French translation: Pourquoi l'ange de l'histoire regarde-t-il vers l'arrière? Translated by Marc Sagnol. In: Les Temps Modernes. Paris, year 58, no. 624, May–June–July 2003, ISSN 0040-3075, pp. 54–74.
  - English translation: The Concept of History in Walter Benjamin's Critical Theory. In: Radical Philosophy Review. Radical Philosophy Association, San Francisco, CA, vol. 13, no. 1, 2010, ISSN 1388-4441, pp. 19–42.
  - Italian translation: "Perché l'angelo della storia guarda indietro?" In: Marxismo oggi. Rivista quadrimestrale di cultura e politica, Milano, Teti Editore, spring 2004, no. 1, pp. 111–134.
  - Czech translation: Proč se anděl dějin hledí zpět? In: Filosofický časopis. Filosofický ústav Akademie věd České republiky. Prague, Czech Republic, year 55, no. 5, fall 2007, pp. 645–671 (abstract) (complete text)
  - Turkish translation: Tarih Meleği Neden Geriye Bakiyor? In: Cogito. Üç Aylık Düşünce Dergisi, Istanbul, Turkey, Yapi Kredi Yayinlari, no. 52, fall 2007, pp. 161-181 (part 1)., Tarih Meleği Neden Geriye Bakiyor? II. Bölüm. In: Cogito, no. 59, summer 2009 (part 2).
  - Chinese translation: "W.本雅明批判理论中的历史概念 [W. Běn yǎmíng pīpàn lǐlùn zhōng de lìshǐ gàiniàn]". 学 习 与 探 索 [Xuéxí yǔ tànsuǒ] [Study & Exploration]. 262 (5). Harbin, Province Heilongjiang, China: Academy of Social Sciences at Heilongjiang. 2017.
- ¿Quién es Bolívar Echeverría?. In: La Jornada Semanal, supplement of La Jornada. México, no. 805, August 8, 2010, pp. 5–7.
  - English translation, resumed: In Memoriam – Bolívar Echeverría. In: International Sociology. Journal of the International Sociological Association. Sage, London, vol. 26, no. 2, March 2011, ISSN 0268-5809, pp. 266–267.
- Razón, sociedad y Estado en la Filosofía del Estado de Hegel. In: Carlos Oliva Mendoza (ed.), Hegel: la ciencia de la experiencia. México: UNAM, Facultad de Filosofía y Letras, 2010, pp. 139–161. ISBN 9786070215650.
  - English translation: Society and State in Marcuse and Hegel. In: Philosophy StudyNew York, N.Y., January 2014, vol. 4, no. 1, pp. 55–67. ISSN 2159-5313.
- Alfred Schmidt. In: La Jornada Semanal, supplement of La Jornada, México, no. 916, September 23, 2012, p. 16.
  - English translation, resumed: In memoriam Alfred Schmidt. In: International Sociology. Journal of the International Sociological Association. Sage, London, vol. 28, no. 2, March 2013, ISSN 0268-5809, pp. 248–249.
- Adolfo Sánchez Vázquez: rebelión, antifascismo y enseñanza. In: La Jornada Semanal, supplement of La Jornada, México, no. 865, October 2, 2011, pp 8–10.
- Juárez y el liberalismo político mexicano. Aportaciones emancipadoras desde las Américas. In: Revista Internacional de Pensamiento Político, Huelva/Sevilla: Fundación Tercer Milenio/Universidad de Huelva/ Universidad Pablo de Olavide, vol. 8, 2013, pp. 233–250. ISSN 1885-589X.
- The quadruple modern Ethos: Critical Theory in the Americas. In: APA Newsletter on Hispanic/Lantino Issues in Philosophy, Newark, DE: American Philosophical Association/University of Delaware, vol. 14, núm. 1, fall 2014, pp. 2–4. ISSN 2155-9708.
- Subject and identity in today's Latin American philosophy. Bolívar Echeverría: cultural studies and linguistics. In: Interculture philosophy. Journal for Philosophy and its Cultural Context. no. 1, 2015, ISSN 2363-6815, pp. 25–53.
- A Critical Praxis from the Americas. Thinking about the Zapatistas in Chiapas with Herbert Marcuse, Bolivar Echeverría, and Adolfo Sánchez Vázquez. In: Funke, Lamas and Wolfson (eds.), The Great Refusal: Herbert Marcuse and Contemporary Social Movements, Philadelphia, PA: Temple University Press, 2017. ISBN 978-1-4399-1303-1.
- Etnocentrism and Critical Theory. Two cases: United States and Mexico. In: Comunicações. Revista do Programa de Pós Graduação em Educação da Universidade Metodista de Piracicaba. Piracicaba, SP, Brasilien, year. 24, No. 2, May–August 2017, ISSN 0104-8481, pp. 33–56.
- Praxis, Nature, Labour. In: Beverley Best, Werner Bonefeld, Chris O'Kane, Neil Larsen (eds.) The SAGE Handbook of Frankfurt School Critical Theory. Thousand Oaks, CA/London, Sage Publications, 2018. ISBN 978-1-4739-5334-5, pp. 734–749.
- Adolfo Sánchez Vázquez: Philosophy of Praxis as Critical Theory. In: Beverley Best, Werner Bonefeld, Chris O'Kane, Neil Larsen (eds.) The SAGE Handbook of Frankfurt School Critical Theory. Thousand Oaks, CA/London, Sage Publications, 2018. ISBN 978-1-4739-5334-5, pp. 448–464.
- Claude Lanzmanns «Shoah» und meine Generation in Alemania. In: S:I.M.O.N. Shoah: Intervention. Methods. Documentation. Vienna Wiesenthal Institute of Holocaust Studies, Viena, vol. 5, No. 1, June 2019, pp. 101–114. ISSN 2408-9192.
- Sprechen und Hören im Spätkapitalismus. Reflektionen zur kritischen Theorie Bolívar Echeverrías. In: Zeitschrift für kritische Theorie. Lüneburg, Allemagne, year 25, No. 48/49, October–November 2019, ISSN 0945-7313, pp. 117–144.
- Cuatro encuentros con Bolívar Echeverría. In: La Jornada Semanal. Supplement of La Jornada. México, no. 1320, June 21, 2020, p. 12.
- Préface à la présente édition. In: Adolfo Sánchez Vázquez Philosophie de la praxis. Trans. Luis Dapelo. Paris, Éditions Delga, 2020. ISBN 978-2-37607-180-8, pp. 5–42.
- 历史风气，资本主义现代性的四重风气和巴洛克风情。 B.Echeverría 对美洲批判理论的贡献. [Historical Ethos, Quadruple Ethos of the Capitalist Modernity and Baroque Ethos. Contributions of B. Echeverría for A Critical Theory from the Americas.] In: 当代国外马克思主义评论 [Contemporary Marxism Review. The journal of the Center for Contemporary Marxism Abroad], Shanghai, Fudan University Press, Nr. 23, 2022, pp. 86–122.
- 阿道弗·桑切斯·巴斯克斯的实践哲学.; [Adolfo Sánchez Vázquez's Philosophy of Praxis.] In: 当代国外马克思主义评论 [Contemporary Marxism Review. The journal of the Center for Contemporary Marxism Abroad], Shanghai, Fudan University Press, Vol. 35, Nr. 4, 2024, pp. 434–455.
- Reflections from the Americas on Marcuse’s State Philosophy. In: Jina Fast, Nicole K. Mayberry, Sid Simpson (Hrsg.): Creolizing Marcuse. Lanham, Maryland/London, Rowman & Littelfield, 2025. ISBN 9781538198148, pp. 213–232.
- Critical theory from the Americas. In: Arthur Bueno, David Strecker y Mariana Teixeira (Hrsg.): De-Centering Global Sociology. The peripheral turn in social theory and research. London, Routledge, 2023, 198 S. ISBN 978-0-367-51481-5, S. 49–63.
- Multiple Subjectivities in Neoliberal Times: Reflections from a Critical Theory in Latin America. In: Taylor Hines, Peter-Erwin Jansen, Robert E. Kirsch, Terry Maley (Hrsg.): The Dialectics of Liberation in Dark Times. Marcuse’s Thought in the Neoliberal Era. London, Palgrave Macmillan, 2023. ISBN 978-3-031-22487-4, S. 163–185.
- Philosophical Foundations of the Critical Theory from the Americas. On the social philosophies of Bolívar Echeverría and Adolfo Sánchez Vázquez. In: Journal of Speculative Philosophy, Jg. 38, Nr. 2. University Park, Pennsylvania, Penn State University Press, Juni 2024, S. 186-205. ISSN 0891-625X, e-ISSN 1527-9383.
- Reflections from the Americas on Marcuse’s State Philosophy. In: Jina Fast, Nicole K. Mayberry y Sid Simpson (Hrsg.), Creolizing Marcuse, Rowman & Littelfield, Lanham, Maryland/London, 2024 (ebook) und 2025 (print), S. 213-232. ISBN 9781538198148 (print), ISBN 9781538198155 (epub) y 9798881862398 (pdf).
- Ideology, Fetishism and Objective Appearance on Marx’s Philosophical Reflections in Capital as Foundation for a Critical Theory of Society. In: World Marxist Review, World Association for Political Economy/Northwestern Polytechnical University/Canut Press, China, Vol. 2, No. 3, Sept. 2025. ISSN 3023-672X (print), e-ISSN 3023-8056 (Online), S. 21-34.
- The Berlin wall: an involuntary anti-fascist monument. (Together with Sandra Loyola Guizar.) In: Daniel Palacios González und José María Durán Medraño (Hrsg.), Redefining Monuments: Materialist Memory Theories and Radical Heritage Practices. London, Palgrave Mcmillan, 2025. ISBN 978-3-031-86381-3 (hardcover), ISBN 978-3-031-86384-4 (paperback), e-ISBN 978-3-031-86382-0.
- Critical Theory and Latin America. Towards a philosophical discussion between Mexico and Germany. In: Alexis Gros, Agustín L. Prestifilippo and Santiago M. Roggerone (eds.), Contemporary Critical Theory and Latin America. A South-North Dialogue on the Crises of the Present. London, Routledge, 2026. ISBN 9781041012559.

=== Television lectures ===
- Javier Laso, Stefan Gandler, Palabra Suelta: Bolívar Echeverría, (part 2). In: ECTV (Ecuador TV), July 14, 2010.
- Ismael Carvallo, Stefan Gandler, Marxismo crítico en México. Adolfo Sánchez Vázquez y Bolívar Echeverría. In: Plaza de Armas, no. 92, Canal Capital21, México, February 15, 2012.
- Alfredo Rodríguez, Stefan Gandler, Teoría crítica: imposible resignarse. Pesadillas de represión y aventuras de emancipación . In: Presencia universitaria, TV UAQ, Universidad Autónoma de Querétaro, February 7, 2018, canal 24.1.
- Teoría crítica desde la Américas . In: Presencia universitaria, TV UAQ, Universidad Autónoma de Querétaro, September 26, 2018, channel 24.1.
- La teoría crítica de Theodor W. Adorno en su 50 aniversario luctuoso . In: Presencia universitaria, TV UAQ, Universidad Autónoma de Querétaro, August 14, 2019, channel 24.1.
- David Antonio Jiménez, Stefan Gandler, Aportaciones filosóficas y socio teóricas de Bolívar Echeverría . In: Presencia universitaria, TV UAQ, Universidad Autónoma de Querétaro, January 2, 2020, channel 24.1.
- David Antonio Jiménez, Stefan Gandler, La teoría crítica de Walter Benjamin . In: Presencia universitaria, TV UAQ, Universidad Autónoma de Querétaro, May 14, 2020, channel 24.1.

=== Radio lecture ===
- Sound recording of the tribute to Habermas: Jürgen Habermas (1929-2026). Eine kritische Würdigung, Innsbruck University, March 24, 2026. Shortened version: Jürgen Habermas, Taktgeber der Nachkriegsgeneration und kritischer Staatsphilosoph broadcast in the radio program Philosophischer Brocken, Viena University, May 26, 2026.

== Secondary literature (selection) ==
In English

- Willem Assies: (Review of: S. Gandler, Critical Marxism in Mexico. Adolfo Sánchez Vázquez and Bolívar Echeverría) Gandler, Stefan: Peripherer Marxismus. Kritische Theorie in Mexiko. In: Thesis Eleven. Critical Theory and Historical Sociology. Australia, no. 71, nov. 2002, pp. 133–139.
- Michael Löwy, At a Glance: Stefan Gandler, Marxismo crítico en México: Adolfo Sánchez Vázquez y Bolívar Echeverría. In: International Sociology. Journal of the International Sociological Association, Sage Publications, London, vol. 23, no. 2, March 2008, p. 235. ISSN 0268-5809.
- Carlos Alberto Sánchez, From the editor. In: APA Newsletter on Hispanic/Latino Issues in Philosophy, American Philosophical Association, University of Delaware, Newark, DE, vol. 14, no. 1, fall 2014, p. 1. ISSN 2155-9708.
- Javier Sethness, Stefan Gandler: Critical Marxism in Mexico. Adolfo Sánchez Vázquez and Bolívar Echeverría. In: Marx & Philosophy. Review of Books. Canterbury, 25. Nov. 2016.
- Arnold L. Farr, Review of Critical Marxism in Mexico: Adolfo Sánchez Vázquez and Bolivar Echeverría (Haymarket). In: Lateral. Journal of the Cultural Studies Association. núm. 6.1, Chicago, IL, 2017, ISSN 2469-4053.
- Jake M. Bartholomew, Stefan Gandler's Renewal of Critical Theory from Latin America. In: The Journal of Speculative Philosophy. vol. 37, no. 3, University Park, PA, 2023, pp. 308-318. ISSN 1527-9383.

In Spanish (book reviews)

- Levy del Águila, Stefan Gandler: Marxismo crítico en México: Adolfo Sánchez Vázquez y Bolívar Echeverría ). In: Areté. Revista de Filosofía, Pontificia Universidad Católica del Perú, Departamento de Humanidades, vol. 20, no. 2, 2008, pp. 335–344. ISSN 1016-913X.
- José Cepedello Boiso, Marxismo crítico en México. In: Revista Internacional de Pensamiento Político, Fundación Tercer Milenio/Universidad de Huelva/Universidad Pablo de Olavide de Sevilla, vol. 4, 1st semester of 2009, pp. 231–233. ISSN 1885-589X.
- Jaime Torres Guillén, Praxis y ethos moderno como crítica al eurocentrismo. In: Desacatos. Revista de Antropología Social, Mexico City, Centro de Investigaciones y Estudios en Antropología Social, no. 30, May–August 2009, pp. 178–185. ISSN 1405-9274.
- Israel Sanmartín, Marxismo crítico en México: Adolfo Sánchez Vázquez y Bolívar Echeverría. In: Memoria y civilización. Anuario de Historia, Universidad de Navarra, Pamplona, España, no. 13, 2010, pp. 124–127. ISSN 1139-0107.
- Julio Boltvinik, Fragmentos de Frankfurt. Ensayos sobre la Teoría crítica. (Part 1). In: La Jornada, Mexico City, Nov. 5, 2010, p. 26. (Part 2: Nov. 12, p. 32.)
- Aureliano Ortega Esquivel, Stefan Gandler, Fragmentos de Frankfurt. Ensayos sobre la Teoría crítica. In: Diánoia. Revista de Filosofía. Instituto de Investigaciones Filosóficas, Universidad Nacional Autónoma de México, Mexico City, Vol. 57, no. 68, May 2012, pp. 220–224.
- Lissette Silva Lazcano, Stefan Gandler (2013), El discreto encanto de la modernidad. Ideologías contemporáneas y su crítica. In: Signos Filosóficos. Universidad Autónoma Metropolitana Iztapalapa, Mexico City, no. 33, January–June 2015, pp. 126–131. ISSN 1665-1324.
- Rebeca Pérez León, Stefan Gandler, El discreto encanto de la modernidad. Ideologías contemporáneas y su crítica. In: Estudios Sociológicos. Centro de Estudios Sociológicos, Colegio de México, Mexico City, year 34, no. 101, May–August 2016, pp. 432–441.
- Bernardo Cortés Márquez, Sobre un pequeño desencantamiento de Occidente. In: Metapolítica. Benémerita Universidad Autonoma de Puebla, Pubela, Mexico, no. 95, Nov. 2016.

In German (book reviews)

- Christoph Görg: Gandler, Stefan: Peripherer Marxismus. In: Peripherie. Zeitschrift für Politik und Ökonomie in der Dritten Welt, Berlin, 2000, no. 8. pp. 112–115.
- Jörg Nowak: Gandler, Stefan: Peripherer Marxismus. Kritische Theorie in Mexiko. In: Das Argument. Zeitschrift für Philosophie und Sozialwissenschaften. Hamburg, Berlin, year 43, vol. 242, no. 4/5, 2001, ISSN 0004-1157, pp. 710–711.
- Hans Schelkshorn: Undogmatischer Marxismus in Mexiko. In: Polylog. Zeitschrift für interkulturelles Philosophieren. Vienna, no. 7, 2001, pp. 96–97.
- Jörg Nowak: Gandler, Stefan, Frankfurter Fragmente. Essays zur kritischen Theorie, Peter Lang, Frankfurt/M 2013. In: Das Argument. Zeitschrift für Philosophie und Sozialwissenschaften. Hamburg/Berlin, year 57, vol. 311, no. 1, 2015, ISSN 0004-1157, pp. 113–115.
