= George Ciccariello-Maher =

American political scientist (born 1979)

- Born: George Joseph Ciccariello-Maher IV; March 12, 1979 (age 47)

Academic background
- Education: University of California, Berkeley
- Thesis: Identity against Totality: the Counterdiscourse of Separation beyond the Decolonial Turn (2010)
- Doctoral advisor: Wendy Brown
- Influences: Wendy Brown, C. L. R. James, Georges Sorel, Hegel, Frantz Fanon, Michel Foucault, Enrique Dussel

Academic work
- Discipline: Political theorist

George Ciccariello-Maher (born March 12, 1979), also known as Geo Maher, is an American political scientist. His provocative opinions—including a tweet in 2016 ("All I Want for Christmas is White Genocide") resulted in his losing his post as associate professor of politics and global studies at Drexel University.

== Early life and education ==
Born in Maine in 1979, George Ciccariello-Maher and his two siblings grew up in impoverished conditions. The family shopped at Salvation Army thrift stores. His mother said they lived without electricity for nine years.

George did his undergraduate work at St. Lawrence University and Cambridge University, where he was a Davies-Jackson Scholar. He earned a master's degree at UC Berkeley before taking a sabbatical in Mexico, which helped him become fluent in Spanish. He then completed his Ph.D. in political science at Berkeley in 2010.

== Academic career ==
Ciccariello-Maher was appointed assistant professor of politics and global studies at Drexel University in Philadelphia in 2010. He was promoted to associate professor in 2016.

He has authored several scholarly books. His first, We Created Chavez: A People's History of the Venezuelan Revolution, chronicles the Bolivarian Revolution. He also translated the writings of Enrique Dussel, Immanuel Wallerstein, and Stefan Gandler. He served on the editorial board of Abolition: A Journal of Insurgent Politics, and is co-editor (with Bruno Bosteels) of the Duke University Press book series "Radical Américas".

Ciccariello-Maher has often commented on politically charged events in the U.S., such as the role of white supremacy in the killings of Trayvon Martin, shooting death of Michael Brown, the deaths of Freddie Gray and Philando Castile, the Ferguson unrest, the 2015 Baltimore protests, and the movement to abolish the police. In 2025, he spoke publicly about Luigi Mangione, accused of murdering UnitedHealthcare CEO Brian Thompson.

Throughout 2017, Ciccariello-Maher became a subject of national controversy after he tweeted the prior Christmas Eve, "All I want for Christmas is white genocide". He added, "To clarify: when the whites were massacred during the Haitian Revolution, that was a good thing indeed". In April 2017, Drexel's provost M. Brian Blake announced that the university had launched an investigation into Ciccariello-Maher's Twitter communications. In October, Drexel placed the professor on administrative leave. On December 28, 2017, the university accepted his resignation, effective December 31. Ciccariello-Maher cited "nearly a year of harassment by right-wing, white supremacist media outlets and Internet mobs, after death threats and threats of violence directed against me and my family."

Between 2018 and 2019, he was a visiting scholar at New York University's Hemispheric Institute of Performance and Politics. He also held visiting positions at the College of William & Mary and the National Autonomous University of Mexico.

As of 2026, he was a part-time lecturer at the University of Pennsylvania and taught at the Brooklyn Institute for Social Research in New York.

== Activism ==
While in England as a university student, Ciccariello-Maher was a member of Cambridge's Anti-Capitalist Action (CACA) group, and was later arrested during the 20 March 2003 anti-war protest that occurred the day after the U.S. invasion of Iraq. When four of his activist friends were rusticated from King's College, Cambridge in 2002 for participating in a squatted social center, Ciccariello-Maher co-authored an appeal that resulted in their reinstatement.

He was a member of Bring the Ruckus, co-founded by the late Joel Olson. In Oakland, he was arrested for involvement in the protests that followed the shooting death of Oscar Grant by transit officer Johannes Mehserle.

As a longtime supporter of Venezuela's Bolivarian Revolution, Ciccariello-Maher spoke out against the country's widespread protests in early 2014. He was interviewed on Democracy Now and said that opposition leader Leopoldo López was being portrayed in The Washington Post as a "left-leaning moderate", but actually "represents the far right of the Venezuelan political spectrum" with direct ties to the U.S. Ciccariello-Maher was also critical of anarchists and leftists who were advocating for the Venezuelan opposition.

In 2017, he was a keynote speaker for the Oxford Radical Forum, held at the University of Oxford.

In 2019, he was involved in the activities of the American Historical Association's Historians for Peace and Democracy group.

In 2023, he founded the W.E.B. Du Bois Movement School for Abolition & Reconstruction in Philadelphia, with financial help from the Abolitionist Law Center, and became its coordinator. He spoke at the 2025 Socialism Conference, organised by Haymarket Books.

== Social media controversies ==
Ciccariello-Maher's statements on social media have embroiled him in controversy, including calls for his dismissal from teaching. In the wake of the 2015 Baltimore unrest, he wrote in Salon that "Riots Work", that racism against white people is imaginary, and that the police should be abolished. In the same year, he tweeted that a South Carolina school police officer, who lost his job after body-slamming a black female student during an arrest, should be "put up against a wall" and done "like Old Yeller."

Ciccariello-Maher's biggest controversy stemmed from his Christmas Eve 2016 tweet about "white genocide". He said the tweet was sent in response to a racist backlash against State Farm Insurance for purportedly advancing "white genocide" by depicting an interracial couple in an advertisement. He reported receiving more than 100 death threats and 250 voicemails. His family members were harassed on social media. His mother got a threatening call at home in Maine. On Christmas Day, Drexel issued a public statement disavowing Ciccariello-Maher's tweet:

Drexel became aware today of Associate Professor George Ciccariello-Maher's inflammatory tweet, which was posted on his personal Twitter account on Dec[ember] 24, 2016. While the University recognizes the right of its faculty to freely express their thoughts and opinions in public debate, Professor Ciccariello-Maher's comments are utterly reprehensible, deeply disturbing, and do not in any way reflect the values of the University. The University is taking this situation very seriously. We contacted Ciccariello-Maher today to arrange a meeting to discuss this matter in detail.

When answering questions about the tweet, Ciccariello-Maher wrote: "On Christmas Eve, I sent a satirical tweet about an imaginary concept, 'white genocide.' For those who haven't bothered to do their research, 'white genocide' is an idea invented by white supremacists and used to denounce everything from interracial relationships to multicultural policies.... It is a figment of the racist imagination, it should be mocked, and I'm glad to have mocked it". He condemned Drexel's response, which "amounts to caving to the truly reprehensible movements and organizations that I was critiquing... White supremacy is on the rise, and we must fight it by any means. In that fight, universities will need to choose whether they are on the side of free expression and academic debate, or on the side of the racist mob."

Some observers criticized Drexel, claiming that he misinterpreted Ciccariello-Maher's tweet, and infringed on his academic freedom and due process. Hank Reichman, chair of the American Association of University Professors Committee on Academic Freedom, suggested that "Drexel should apologize to Professor Cicciariello-Maher."

Theodore Kupfer, managing editor of National Review, called Ciccariello-Maher hypocritical for his pro-free speech stance, citing his prior attempts to suppress the speech of people on the political right. Kupfer also mentioned the professor's support for former Venezuelan President Hugo Chávez and current President Nicolás Maduro, who were accused of violating the free speech of their political opponents, and using physical force against them.

In March 2017, Ciccariello-Maher provoked more controversy by tweeting his reaction to what he witnessed on a plane flight: "Some guy in first class gave up his seat for a uniformed soldier. People are thanking him. I'm trying not to vomit or yell about Mosul." The tweet alluded to the recent U.S. bombing of Mosul that killed 200 civilians.

Shortly after the October 2017 Las Vegas mass shooting, Ciccariello-Maher tweeted that the tragedy, which left 59 people dead and hundreds injured, was the product of a system that favors white males. His statements such as "It's the white supremacist patriarchy, stupid" led to death threats against him. Subsequently, he published an op-ed in The Washington Post where he elaborated on his social media comments:

Last week, I sent a string of relatively uncontroversial tweets in the aftermath of the Las Vegas massacre, in which I sought to answer a question about mass shootings in the United States: "Why are these crimes almost always carried out by white men? "It's the white supremacist patriarchy, stupid," I tweeted, before then diagnosing a sense of double entitlement – as white people and as men – that, when frustrated, can occasionally lead to violent consequences.

He added that "the narrative of white victimization has been gradually built over the past 40 years" and that "White people and men are told that they are entitled to everything. This is what happens when they don't get what they want." Throughout Ciccariello-Maher's many controversies, Drexel distanced itself from the professor's statements and claimed that the university was losing prospective students and donors because of the furor over his tweets.

== Bibliography ==
=== Books ===
- Ciccariello-Maher, George (2013). We Created Chávez: A People's History of the Venezuelan Revolution. Durham, North Carolina: Duke University Press. ISBN 978-0-82235-452-9. OCLC 963857640.
  - Spanish translation: Nosotros creamos a Chávez: Una historia popular de la revolución venezolana. Translated by Valentina Figuera.
  - French translation: La révolution au Venezuela: Une histoire populaire. Translated by Étienne Dobenesque.
  - Arabic translation: نحن من صنعنا تشافيز تاريخٌ شعبيٌّ للثورةِ الفنزولية. Translated by Bassam Abu-Ghazalah.
- Ciccariello-Maher, George (2016). Building the Commune: Radical Democracy in Venezuela. New York: Verso. ISBN 978-1-78478-223-8. OCLC 957554745.
- Ciccariello-Maher, George (2017). Decolonizing Dialectics. Radical Américas. Durham, North Carolina: Duke University Press. ISBN 978-0-82237-370-4. OCLC 940521740.
- Ciccariello-Maher, George (2018). "Chapter 6: Venezuela Between Two States". In Falleti, Tulia G.; Parrado, Emilio A. (eds.). Latin America Since the Left Turn. Democracy, Citizenship, and Constitutionalism. University of Pennsylvania Press. pp. 113–137. ISBN 978-0-8122-4971-2. JSTOR j.ctv16t6m7s.9.
- Maher, Geo (2021). A World Without Police: How Strong Communities Make Cops Obsolete. London: Verso Books. ISBN 9781839760051.
- Maher, Geo (2022). Anticolonial Eruptions: Racial Hubris and the Cunning of Resistance. Oakland, CA: University of California Press. ISBN 9780520379350.

=== Articles ===
- "El Libertario: beware Venezuela's false 'anarchists'". ROAR. March 28, 2014.
- "We must disband the police: Body cameras aren't enough—only radical change will stop cops who kill". Salon.com. April 24, 2015. Archived from the original on April 25, 2015.
- "Riots work: Wolf Blitzer and the Washington Post completely missed the real lesson from Baltimore". Salon.com. May 4, 2015. Archived from the original on May 6, 2015.
- "Yes, Philando Castile Was Killed for the Color of His Skin". Jacobin. July 19, 2016.
- "Conservatives Are the Real Campus Thought Police Squashing Academic Freedom". The Washington Post. October 10, 2017.
- Ciccariello-Maher, George (2018). "The Time of the Commune". Diacritics. 46 (2): 72–94. doi:10.1353/dia.2018.0010. JSTOR 26776659.
- "Review: Cutting the Populist Knot". Latin American Research Review. 55 (2): 368–378. 2020. doi:10.25222/larr.961. JSTOR 27037759.
