= Liebe Dein Symptom wie Dich selbst! =

1996 film

- VHS Cover
- Directed by: Claudia Willke; Katharina Höcker
- Starring: Slavoj Žižek
- Release date: 1996
- Country: Germany
- Languages: English; German

Liebe Dein Symptom wie Dich selbst! (German: Thou shalt love thy symptom as thyself; 1996) is a German documentary film about the Slovenian philosopher and psychoanalyst Slavoj Žižek.

The title of the film is taken from a book published under the same name by Žižek via Merve Verlag, a Berlin-based publisher with leftist orientation.

The film opens with Žižek sharing a joke that he has repeated elsewhere.

This river here is the official geographical limit between the Balkans and Mitteleuropa. So, beware! On the other side: Horror, oriental despotism, women get beaten, get raped, and like it. On this side: Europe, civilization, women get beaten, get raped, and don’t like it.

== See also ==
- Žižek!
- Marx Reloaded
- The Reality of the Virtual
- The Pervert's Guide to Cinema
- The Pervert's Guide to Ideology
- Examined Life
- Jacques Lacan
