= Slavoj Žižek =

Slovenian philosopher (born 1949)

- Žižek in 2026
- Born: 21 March 1949 (age 77); Ljubljana, PR Slovenia, FPR Yugoslavia
- Political party: Democracy in Europe Movement 2025 (2016–present)
- Other political affiliations: See list: Alliance of Socialist Youth of Slovenia (1990); League of Communists of Slovenia (until 1988)
- Spouse: Jela Krečič (m. 2013)
- Children: 2

Education
- Education: University of Ljubljana (BA, MA, DA); University of Paris VIII (PhD)
- Thesis: La philosophie entre le symptôme et le fantasme (1986)
- Doctoral advisor: Jacques-Alain Miller

Philosophical work
- Era: Contemporary philosophy
- Region: Western philosophy
- School: Continental philosophy; Ljubljana school of psychoanalysis; Lacanian psychoanalysis; Post-Hegelianism; Freudo-Marxism
- Institutions: University of Ljubljana; University of Paris VIII; New York University; Birkbeck, University of London
- Doctoral students: Adrian Johnston; Alenka Zupančič
- Main interests: Ideology; Marxism; ontology; political theory; psychoanalysis; cultural studies; film theory; theology; German idealism; dialectic
- Notable ideas: Interpassivity; Over-identification; Ideological fantasy (ideology as an unconscious fantasy that structures reality); Revival of dialectical materialism

Slavoj Žižek (Note: /ˈslɑːvɔɪ ˈʒiːʒək/ SLAH-voy ZHEE-zhək; Slovene: [ˈsláːʋɔj ˈʒíːʒək]) (born 21 March 1949) is a Slovenian philosopher, cultural theorist and public intellectual.

Žižek is a Global Distinguished Professor of German at New York University, professor of philosophy and psychoanalysis at the European Graduate School and senior researcher at the Institute for Sociology and Philosophy at the University of Ljubljana. He was the international director of the Birkbeck Institute for the Humanities at the University of London from 2004 until September 2025. He primarily works on continental philosophy (particularly Hegelianism, Lacanian psychoanalysis and Marxism) and political theory, as well as film criticism and theology.

Žižek is an associate of the Ljubljana School of Psychoanalysis, a group of Slovenian academics working on German idealism, Lacanian psychoanalysis, ideology critique, and media criticism. His first book in English is The Sublime Object of Ideology (1989), which was used in the introduction of the Ljubljana School's thought to English-speaking audiences. He has written over 50 books in multiple languages and speaks Slovene, Serbo-Croatian, English, German, and French. The idiosyncratic style of his public appearances, frequent magazine op-eds, and academic works, characterised by the use of obscene jokes and pop cultural examples, as well as politically incorrect provocations, have gained him fame, controversy, and criticism both in and outside academia.

== Life and career ==
=== Early life ===
Žižek was born in Ljubljana, PR Slovenia, Yugoslavia, into a middle-class family. His father Jože Žižek was an economist and civil servant from the region of Prekmurje in eastern Slovenia. His mother Vesna, a native of the Gorizia Hills in the Slovenian Littoral, was an accountant in a state enterprise. His parents were atheists. He spent most of his childhood in the coastal town of Portorož, where he was exposed to Western film, theory and popular culture. When Žižek was a teenager, his family moved back to Ljubljana where he attended Bežigrad High School. Originally wanting to become a filmmaker himself, he abandoned these ambitions and chose to pursue philosophy instead.

=== Education ===
In 1967, during an era of liberalization in Titoist Yugoslavia, Žižek enrolled at the University of Ljubljana and studied philosophy and sociology.

Žižek had already begun reading French structuralists prior to entering university, and in 1967 he published the first translation of a text by Jacques Derrida into Slovenian. Žižek frequented the circles of dissident intellectuals, including the Heideggerian philosophers Tine Hribar and Ivo Urbančič, and published articles in alternative magazines, such as Praxis, Tribuna and Problemi, which he also edited. In 1971, he accepted a job as an assistant researcher with the promise of tenure, but was dismissed after his Master's thesis was denounced by the authorities as being "non-Marxist". He graduated from the University of Ljubljana in 1981 with a Doctor of Arts in Philosophy for his dissertation entitled The Theoretical and Practical Relevance of French Structuralism. He spent the next few years in what was described as "professional wilderness", spending four years doing national service in the Yugoslav People's Army in Karlovac and four years unemployed.

=== Academic career ===
During the 1980s, Žižek edited and translated Jacques Lacan, Sigmund Freud, and Louis Althusser. He used Lacan's work to interpret Hegelian and Marxist philosophy.

In 1986, Žižek completed a second doctorate, a Doctor of Philosophy in psychoanalysis, at the University of Paris VIII under Jacques-Alain Miller, entitled "La philosophie entre le symptôme et le fantasme".

Žižek wrote the introduction to Slovene translations of G. K. Chesterton's and John le Carré's detective novels. In 1988, he published his first book dedicated entirely to film theory, Pogled s strani. The following year, he achieved international recognition as a social theorist with the 1989 publication of his first book in English, The Sublime Object of Ideology.

Žižek has been publishing in journals such as Lacanian Ink and In These Times in the United States, the New Left Review and The London Review of Books in the United Kingdom, and with the Slovenian left-liberal magazine Mladina and newspapers Dnevnik and Delo. He also cooperates with the Polish leftist magazine Krytyka Polityczna, regional southeast European left-wing journal Novi Plamen, and serves on the editorial board of the psychoanalytical journal Problemi. Žižek is a series editor of the Northwestern University Press series Diaeresis that publishes works that "deal not only with philosophy, but also will intervene at the levels of ideology critique, politics, and art theory".

In 2012, Foreign Policy listed Žižek on its list of Top 100 Global Thinkers, calling him "a celebrity philosopher", while elsewhere he has been dubbed the "Elvis of cultural theory" and "the most dangerous philosopher in the West". Žižek has been called "the leading Hegelian of our time", and "the foremost exponent of Lacanian theory". A journal, the International Journal of Žižek Studies, was founded by professors David J. Gunkel and Paul A. Taylor to engage with his work.

=== Political career ===
In the late 1980s, Žižek came to public attention as a columnist for the alternative youth magazine Mladina, which was critical of Tito's policies and Yugoslav politics, especially the militarization of society. He was a member of the League of Communists of Slovenia until October 1988, when he quit in protest against the JBTZ trial together with 32 other Slovenian intellectuals. Between 1988 and 1990, he was actively involved in several political and civil society movements which fought for the democratization of Slovenia, most notably the Committee for the Defence of Human Rights. In the first free elections in 1990, he ran as the Liberal Democratic Party's candidate for the former four-person collective presidency of Slovenia. He only slightly missed becoming elected, receiving the fifth-most votes.

Žižek is a member of the Democracy in Europe Movement 2025 (DiEM25) founded in 2016.

=== Public life ===
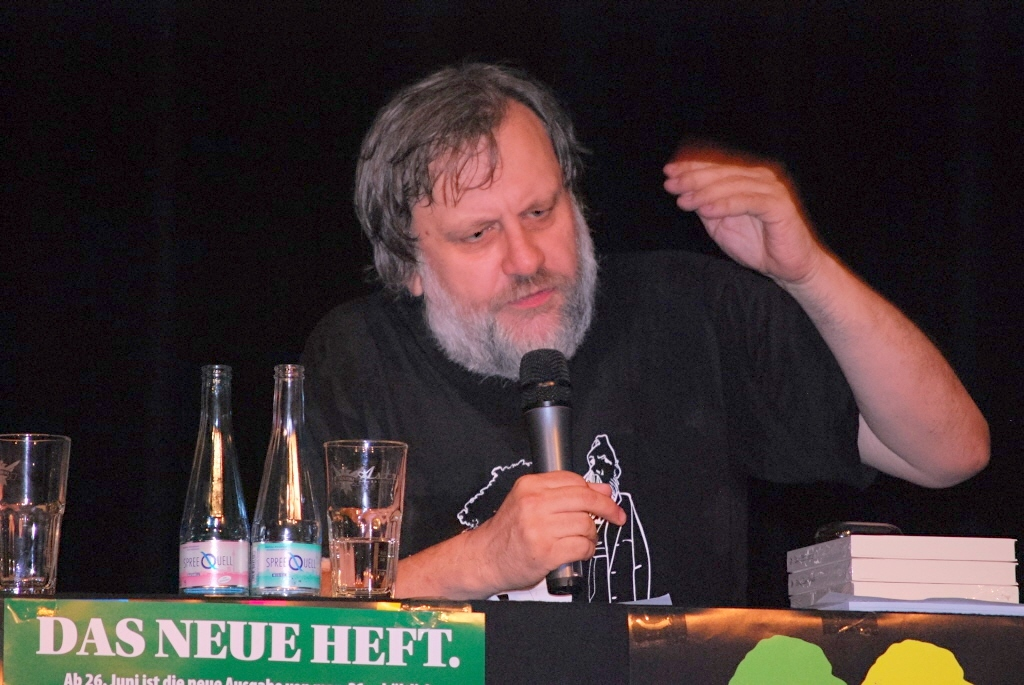
Žižek speaking in 2011

In 2003, Žižek wrote the text to accompany Bruce Weber's photographs in a catalog for Abercrombie & Fitch. Questioned as to the seemliness of a major intellectual writing ad copy, Žižek told The Boston Globe, "If I were asked to choose between doing things like this to earn money and becoming fully employed as an American academic, kissing ass to get a tenured post, I would with pleasure choose writing for such journals!"

Žižek and his thought have been the subject of several documentaries. The 1996 Liebe Dein Symptom wie Dich selbst! is a German documentary on him. In the 2004 The Reality of the Virtual, Žižek gave an hour-long lecture on his interpretation of Lacan's tripartite thesis of the imaginary, the symbolic, and the real. Zizek! is a 2005 documentary by Astra Taylor on his philosophy. The 2006 The Pervert's Guide to Cinema and 2012 The Pervert's Guide to Ideology also portray Žižek's ideas and cultural criticism. Examined Life (2008) features Žižek speaking about his conception of ecology at a garbage dump. He was also featured in the 2011 Marx Reloaded, directed by Jason Barker.

Foreign Policy named Žižek one of its 2012 Top 100 Global Thinkers "for giving voice to an era of absurdity".

In 2019, Žižek began hosting a mini-series called How to Watch the News with Slavoj Žižek on the RT network. In April, Žižek debated psychology professor Jordan Peterson at the Sony Centre in Toronto, Canada over happiness under capitalism versus Marxism.

== Personal life ==
Žižek has been married four times and has two adult sons, Tim and Kostja. His second wife was Slovene philosopher and socio-legal theorist Renata Salecl, fellow member of the Ljubljana school of psychoanalysis. His third wife was Argentinian model Analia Hounie, whom he married in 2005. Currently, he is married to Slovene journalist, author and philosopher, Jela Krečič.

In early 2018, Žižek experienced Bell's palsy on the right side of his face. He went on to give several lectures and interviews with this condition; on March 9 of that year, during a lecture on political revolutions in London, he commented on the treatment he had been receiving, and used his paralysis as a metaphor for political idleness.

Aside from his native Slovene, Žižek is a fluent speaker of Serbo-Croatian, French, German and English.

=== Taste ===
In the 2012 Sight & Sound critics' poll, Žižek listed his 10 favourite films: 3:10 to Yuma, Dune, The Fountainhead, Hero, Hitman, Nightmare Alley, On Dangerous Ground, Opfergang, The Sound of Music, and We the Living. On this list, he clarified: "I opted for pure madness: the list contains only 'guilty pleasures'". In his tour of The Criterion Collection closet, he chose Trouble in Paradise, Sweet Smell of Success, Picnic at Hanging Rock, Murmur of the Heart, The Joke, The Ice Storm, Great Expectations, Roberto Rossellini's history films, City Lights, a box set of Carl Theodor Dreyer's films, Y tu mamá también and Antichrist.

In an article called "My Favourite Classics", Žižek states that Arnold Schoenberg's Gurre-Lieder is the piece of music he would take to a desert island. He goes on to list other favourites, including Beethoven's Fidelio, Schubert's Winterreise, Mussorgsky's Khovanshchina and Donizetti's L'elisir d'amore. He expresses a particular love for Wagner, particularly Das Rheingold and Parsifal. He ranks Schoenberg over Stravinsky, and insists on Eisler's importance among Schoenberg's followers.

Žižek often lists Franz Kafka, Samuel Beckett and Andrei Platonov as his "three absolute masters of 20th-century literature". He ranks/prefers Varlam Shalamov over Aleksandr Solzhenitsyn, Marina Tsvetaeva and Osip Mandelstam over Anna Akhmatova, Daphne du Maurier over Virginia Woolf, and Samuel Beckett over James Joyce. His theories have been applied to studying a variety of literature, including Finnegans Wake.

== Thought and positions ==
Žižek and his thought have been described by many commentators as "Hegelo-Lacanian". In his early career, Žižek claimed "a theoretical space moulded by three centres of gravity: Hegelian dialectics, Lacanian psychoanalytic theory, and contemporary criticism of ideology", designating "the theory of Jacques Lacan" as the fundamental element. In 2010, Žižek instead claimed that for him Hegel is more fundamental than Lacan—"Even Lacan is just a tool for me to read Hegel. For me, always it is Hegel, Hegel, Hegel."—while in 2019, he claimed that "For me, in some sense, all of philosophy happened in [the] fifty years" between Immanuel Kant's Critique of Pure Reason (1781) and the death of Georg Wilhelm Friedrich Hegel (1831). Alongside his academic, theoretical works, Žižek is a prolific commentator on current affairs and contemporary political debates.

=== Subjectivity ===
For Žižek, although a subject may take on a symbolic (social) position, it can never be reduced to this attempted symbolisation, since the very "taking on" of this position implies a separate 'I', beyond the symbolic, that does the taking on. Yet, under scrutiny, nothing positive can be said about this subject, this 'I', that eludes symbolisation; it cannot be discerned as anything but "that which cannot be symbolised". Thus, without the initial, attempted, failed symbolisation, subjectivity cannot present itself. As Žižek writes in his first book in English: "the subject of the signifier is a retroactive effect of the failure of its own representation; that is why the failure of representation is the only way to represent it adequately."

Žižek attributes this position on the subject to Hegel, particularly his description of man as "the night of the world", and to Lacan, with his description of the barred, split subject, who he sees as developing the Cartesian notion of the cogito. According to Žižek, these thinkers, in insisting on the role of the subject, run counter to "culturalist" or "historicist" positions held by thinkers such as Louis Althusser and Michel Foucault, which posit that "subjects" are bound by and reducible to their historical/cultural(/symbolic) context.

=== Political theory ===
==== Ideology ====
Žižek's Lacanian-informed theory of ideology is one of his major contributions to political theory; his first book in English, The Sublime Object of Ideology, and the documentary The Pervert's Guide to Ideology, in which he stars, are among the well-known places in which it is discussed. Žižek believes that ideology has been frequently misinterpreted as dualistic and, according to him, this misinterpreted dualism posits that there is a real world of material relations and objects outside of oneself, which is accessible to reason.

For Žižek, as for Marx, ideology is made up of fictions that structure political life; in Lacan's terms, ideology belongs to the symbolic order. Žižek argues that these fictions are primarily maintained at an unconscious level, rather than a conscious one. Since, according to psychoanalytic theory, the unconscious can determine one's actions directly, bypassing one's conscious awareness (as in parapraxes), ideology can be expressed in one's behaviour, regardless of one's conscious beliefs. Hence, Žižek breaks with orthodox Marxist accounts that view ideology purely as a system of mistaken beliefs (see False consciousness). Drawing on Peter Sloterdijk's Critique of Cynical Reason, Žižek argues that adopting a cynical perspective is not enough to escape ideology, since, according to Žižek, even though postmodern subjects are consciously cynical about the political situation, they continue to reinforce it through their behaviour.

==== Freedom ====
Žižek claims that (a sense of) political freedom is sustained by a deeper unfreedom, at least under liberal capitalism. In a 2002 article, Žižek endorses Lenin's distinction between formal and actual freedom, claiming that liberal society only contains formal freedom, "freedom of choice within the coordinates of the existing power relations", while prohibiting actual freedom, "the site of an intervention that undermines these very coordinates." In an oft-quoted passage from a book published in the same year, he writes that, in these conditions of liberal censorship, "we 'feel free' because we lack the very language to articulate our unfreedom". In a 2019 article, he writes that Marx "made a valuable point with his claim that the market economy combines in a unique way political and personal freedom with social unfreedom: personal freedom (freely selling myself on the market) is the very form of my unfreedom." However, in 2014, he rejects the "pseudo-Marxist" total derision of 'formal freedom', claiming that it is necessary for critique: "When we are formally free, only then we become aware how limited this freedom actually is."

Žižek co-signed a petition condemning the "use of disproportionate force and retaliatory brutality by the Hong Kong Police against students in university campuses in Hong Kong" during the 2019–2020 Hong Kong protests. The petition concludes with the statement: "We believe the defence of academic freedom, the freedom of speech, freedom of the press, freedom of assembly and association, and the responsibility to protect the safety of our students are universal causes common to all."

=== Religion ===
In a 2006 New York Times op-ed, Žižek wrote that atheism "is a legacy worth fighting for", describing it as "one of Europe's greatest legacies and perhaps our only chance for peace". He said that religious conflict and fundamentalism refute and invert Fyodor Dostoyevsky's assertion that "If there is no God, everything is permitted". He advocated a forthright but respectful criticism of religion, and rejected "the relativist stance of multiple 'regimes of truth', [that disqualifies] as violent imposition any clear insistence on truth". He nonetheless finds conceptual value in Christianity, particularly Protestantism: the subtitle of his 2000 book The Fragile Absolute is "Or, Why Is the Christian Legacy Worth Fighting For?". He has labelled his position "Christian Atheism", and has written about theology at length.

In The Pervert's Guide to Ideology, Žižek suggests that "the only way to be an Atheist is through Christianity", since, he claims, atheism often fails to escape the religious paradigm by remaining faithful to an external guarantor of meaning, simply switching God for natural necessity or evolution. Christianity, on the other hand, in the doctrine of the incarnation, brings God down from the 'beyond' and onto earth, into human affairs; for Žižek, this paradigm is more authentically godless, since the external guarantee is abolished.

=== Communism ===
Although sometimes adopting the title of 'radical leftist', Žižek also identifies as a communist. However, he rejects 20th-century communism as a "total failure", and has stated, "The communism of the 20th century, more specifically all the network of phenomena we refer to as Stalinism are [sic] maybe the worst ideological, political, ethical, social (and so on) catastrophe in the history of humanity." Žižek justifies this choice by claiming that only the term 'communism' signals a genuine step outside of the existing order, in part since the term 'socialism' no longer has radical enough implications, and means nothing more than that one "care[s] for society."

In Marx Reloaded, Žižek rejects both 20th-century totalitarianism and "spontaneous local self-organisation, direct democracy, councils, and so on". There, he endorses a definition of communism as "a society where you, everyone would be allowed to dwell in his or her stupidity", an idea with which he credits Fredric Jameson as the inspiration.

Žižek has labelled himself a "communist in a qualified sense" and has advocated for a "moderately conservative Communism". When he spoke at a conference on The Idea of Communism, he applied (in qualified form) the 'communist' label to the Occupy Wall Street protestors:

They are not communists, if 'communism' means the system which deservedly collapsed in 1990—and remember that the communists who are still in power today run the most ruthless capitalism (in China). ... The only sense in which the protestors are 'communists' is that they care for the commons—the commons of nature, of knowledge—which are threatened by the system. They are dismissed as dreamers, but the true dreamers are those who think that things can go on indefinitely the way they are now, with just a few cosmetic changes. They are not dreamers; they are awakening from a dream which is turning into a nightmare. They are not destroying anything; they are reacting to how the system is gradually destroying itself.

=== Electoral politics ===
In May 2013, during Subversive Festival, Žižek commented: "If they don't support SYRIZA, then, in my vision of the democratic future, all these people will get from me [is] a first-class one-way ticket to [a] gulag." In response, the center-right New Democracy party claimed Žižek's comments should be understood literally, not ironically.

Just before the 2017 French presidential election, Žižek stated that one could not choose between Macron and Le Pen, arguing that the neoliberalism of Macron just gives rise to neofascism anyway. This was in response to many on the left calling for support for Macron to prevent a Le Pen victory.

In 2022, Žižek expressed his support for the Slovenian political party Levica (The Left) at its 5th annual conference.

==== Donald Trump ====
In a 2016 interview with Channel 4, Žižek said that were he American, he would vote for Donald Trump in the 2016 United States presidential election:

I'm horrified at him [Trump]. I'm just thinking that Hillary is the true danger. ... if Trump wins, both big parties, Republicans and Democratics, would have to return to basics, rethink themselves, and maybe some things can happen there. That's my desperate, very desperate hope, that if Trump wins—listen, America is not a dictatorial state, he will not introduce Fascism—but it will be a kind of big awakening. New political processes will be set in motion, will be triggered. But I'm well aware that things are very dangerous here ... I'm just aware that Hillary stands for this absolute inertia, the most dangerous one. Because she is a cold warrior, and so on, connected with banks, pretending to be socially progressive.

These views were derisively characterised as accelerationist by Left Voice. Noam Chomsky said that the disruption caused by a Trump victory would be "completely regressive", and that Žižek's argument was similar to those made in Germany in the 1930s.

In 2019 and 2020, Žižek defended his views, saying that Trump's election "created, for the first time in I don't know how many decades, a true American left", citing the boost it gave Bernie Sanders and Alexandria Ocasio-Cortez.

However, regarding the 2020 United States presidential election, Žižek reported himself "tempted by changing his position", saying "Trump is a little too much". In another interview, he stood by his 2016 "wager" that Trump's election would lead to a socialist reaction ("maybe I was right"), but claimed that "now with coronavirus: no, no—no Trump. ... difficult as it is for me to say this, but now I would say 'Biden better than Trump', although he is far from ideal." In his 2022 book, Heaven in Disorder, Žižek continued to express a preference for Joe Biden over Donald Trump, stating "Trump was corroding the ethical substance of our lives", while Biden lies and represents big capital more politely.

=== Social issues ===
Žižek's views on social issues such as Eurocentrism, immigration and LGBT people have drawn criticism and accusations of bigotry.

==== Decency and political correctness ====
In January 2017, Žižek argued that the populist right represents "the decay of common morality and decency". He contrasted Hegel's concept of Sittlichkeit, the "thick unwritten rules which makes our social life bearable", with political correctness, which he described as "a desperate reaction to this disintegration", that fails by trying to produce precise regulations and prohibitions. In 2018, Žižek wrote that "manners do matter. In tense situations, they are a matter of life and death, a thin line that separates barbarism from civilization." He noted that where vulgarity was associated in the 1960s with the political left, "today, vulgar language is an almost exclusive prerogative of the radical Right, so that the Left finds itself in a surprising position of the defender of decency and public manners".

In November 2024, in a speech at the Oxford Union, Žižek argued that, contrary to the expectation that exposing Donald Trump's vulgarities and lies should weaken him, these are the basis of why his supporters identify with him. "When I was young, we were these old style leftists, we thought those in power have dignity, but we [use] obscene gestures, we use dirty words. And we got the answer, which is that those in power are now more obscene than we even imagined to be. We got it so wrong." Žižek concluded that in the current era of permissiveness, "the question to ask is ... how to restore a basic sense of shame".

==== Europe and multiculturalism ====
In his 1997 article 'Multiculturalism, Or, The Cultural Logic of Multinational Capitalism', Žižek critiqued multiculturalism for privileging a culturally 'neutral' perspective from which all cultures are disaffectedly apprehended in their particularity because this distancing reproduces the racist procedure of Othering. He further argues that a fixation on particular identities and struggles corresponds to an abandonment of the universal struggle against global capitalism.

In his 1998 article 'A Leftist Plea for "Eurocentrism"', he argued that Leftists should 'undermine the global empire of capital, not by asserting particular identities, but through the assertion of a new universality', and that in this struggle the European universalist value of equaliberty (Étienne Balibar's term) should be foregrounded, proposing 'a Leftist appropriation of the European legacy'. Elsewhere, he has also argued, defending Marx, that Europe's destruction of non-European tradition (e.g. through imperialism and slavery) has opened up the space for a 'double liberation', both from tradition and from European domination.

In her 2010 article 'The Two Zizeks', Nivedita Menon criticised Žižek for focusing on differentiation as a colonial project, ignoring how assimilation was also such a project; she also critiqued him as privileging the European Enlightenment Christian legacy as neutral, 'free of the cultural markers that fatally afflict all other religions.' David Pavón Cuéllar, closer to Žižek, also criticised him.

In the mid-2010s, over the issue of Eurocentrism, there was a dispute between Žižek and Walter Mignolo, in which Mignolo (supporting a previous article by Hamid Dabashi, which argued against the centrality of European philosophers like Žižek, criticised by Michael Marder) argued, against Žižek, that decolonial struggle should forget European philosophy, purportedly following Frantz Fanon; in response, Žižek pointed out Fanon's European intellectual influences, and his resistance to being confined within the black tradition, and claimed to be following Fanon on this point. In his book Can Non-Europeans Think? (foreworded by Mignolo), Dabashi also critiqued Žižek for privileging Europe; Žižek argued that Dabashi slanderously and comically misrepresents him through misattribution, a critique supported by Ilan Kapoor.

==== Transgender issues ====
In his 2016 article "The Sexual Is Political", Žižek argued that all subjects are, like transgender subjects, in discord with the sexual position assigned to them. For Žižek, any attempt to escape this antagonism is false and utopian: thus, he rejects both the reactionary attempt to violently impose sexual fixity and the "postgenderist" attempt to escape sexual fixity entirely; he aligns the latter with 'transgenderism', which he claims does not adequately describe the behaviour of actual transgender subjects, who seek a stable "place where they could recognise themselves" (e.g., a bathroom that confirms their identity). Žižek argues for a third bathroom: a "GENERAL GENDER" bathroom that would represent the fact that both sexual positions (Žižek insists on the unavoidable "twoness" of the sexual landscape) are missing something and thus fail to adequately represent the subjects that take them on.

In his 2019 article "Transgender dogma is naive and incompatible with Freud", Žižek argued that there is "a tension in LGBT+ ideology between social constructivism and (some kind of biological) determinism", between the idea that gender is a social construct, and the idea that gender is essential and pre-social. He concludes the essay with a "Freudian solution" to this deadlock:

...psychic sexual identity is a choice, not a biological fact, but it is not a conscious choice that the subject can playfully repeat and transform. It is an unconscious choice which precedes subjective constitution and which is, as such, formative of subjectivity, which means that the change of this choice entails the radical transformation of the bearer of the choice.

Che Gossett criticized Žižek for his use of the "pathologising" term "transgenderism" throughout the 2016 article, and for writing "about trans subjectivity with such assumed authority while ignoring the voices of trans theorists (academics and activists) entirely", as well as for purportedly claiming that a "futuristic" vision underlies so-called "transgenderism", ignoring present-day oppression. Sam Warren Miell and Chris Coffman, both psychoanalytically inclined, have separately criticized Žižek for conflating transgenderism and postgenderism; Miell further criticised the 2014 article for rehearsing homophobic/transphobic clichés (including Žižek's designation of inter-species marriage as a possible "anti-discriminatory demand"), and misusing Lacanian theory; Coffman argued that Žižek should have engaged with contemporary Lacanian trans studies, which would have shown that psychoanalytic and transgender discourses were aligned, not opposed. In response to the title of the 2019 article, McKenzie Wark had t-shirts made with the transgender flag and "Incompatible with Freud" printed on them.

Žižek defended his 2016 article in two follow-up pieces. The first addresses purported misreadings of his position, while the second is a more sustained defence (against Miell) of the article's application of Lacanian theory, to which Miell responded in turn. Douglas Lain also defended Žižek, claiming that context makes it clear that Žižek is "not opposed [to] the struggle of LGBTQ people" but is instead critiquing "a phony liberal ideology that set up the terms of the LGBTQ struggle", "a certain utopian postmodern ideology that seeks to eliminate all limits, to eliminate all binaries, to go beyond norms because the imposition of a limit is patriarchal and oppressive."

In a 2023 piece for Compact entitled "Wokeness is Here to Stay", Žižek saw an embedded "paradox" in the Tavistock and Portman NHS Foundation Trust provision of puberty blockers. Regarding adults being sent to prisons matching their self-identified gender, he cited the case of Isla Bryson whom he referred to as "a person who identifies itself as a woman using its penis to rape two women". He wrote, "[t]he point here is that there is no easy solution, because sexual identity is in itself not a simple form of identity, but a complex dimension, full of inconsistencies and unconscious features." Melanie Zelle on Swarthmore Phoenix responded critically.

=== Global affairs ===
In 2013, Žižek corresponded with imprisoned Russian activist and Pussy Riot member Nadezhda Tolokonnikova.

All hearts were beating for you as long as you were perceived as just another version of the liberal-democratic protest against the authoritarian state. The moment it became clear that you rejected global capitalism, reporting on Pussy Riot became much more ambiguous.

In 2015, he criticized Western military interventions, alongside "great powers exert[ing] their economic colonialism", in developing countries. He asserted, "It was the European intervention in Libya which threw the country in chaos. It was the [U.S.-led invasion of Iraq] which created the conditions for the rise of ISIS. The ongoing civil war in the Central African Republic is not just an explosion of ethnic hatred; France and China are fighting for the control of oil resources through their proxies".

Žižek believes that China is the combination of capitalism and authoritarianism in their extreme forms, and the Chinese Communist Party is the best protector of the interests of capitalists. From the Cultural Revolution to the reform and opening up, "Mao himself created the ideological condition for rapid capitalist development by tearing apart the fabric of traditional society."

It is capitalism, again and again, that emerges as the only alternative, the only way to move forward and the dynamic force for change when social life gets stuck into some fixed form. Today, capitalism is much more revolutionary than the traditional Left obsessed with protecting the old achievements of the welfare state. Just consider how much capitalism has changed the entire texture of our societies in the past decades.

In 2016, Žižek wrote "The true tragedy is that the very remaining authenticity of the Cuban revolution made it possible for the Castro brothers' government to drag on endlessly and meaninglessly, deprived of the last vestiges of an emancipatory potential." He criticized the Western political left's valorization of Cuba out of a perceived loyalty to Fidel Castro, arguing that the U.S. embargo against Cuba could not alone be blamed for its economic crisis. He also wrote, "what right does a typical middle-class Western Leftist...have to despise a Cuban who decided to leave Cuba not only because of political disenchantment but also because of poverty?" He also saw that "[t]here is a small hope" that a "reasonable compromise" between democratization and the maintaining of the "small but important achievements of the Revolution, from healthcare to education," would be reached.

In an opinion article for The Guardian, Žižek argued in favour of giving full support to Ukraine after the Russian invasion and for creating a stronger NATO in response to Russian aggression, later arguing that it would also be a tragedy for Ukraine to yoke itself to western neoliberalism. Commenting on the meeting between Presidents Trump and Zelenskyy in February 2025, he stated, "Ukrainians are being portrayed as if they could choose peace but instead decide to engage in a war that displaces a quarter of their population, just for the sake of a proxy war. But in reality, it's a matter of their survival." He compared the struggle of Ukraine against its occupiers to the Palestinians' struggle against the Israeli occupation.

After the October 7 attacks in Israel, Žižek wrote:

We can and should unconditionally support Israel's right to defend itself against terrorist attacks. But we also must unconditionally sympathize with the truly desperate and hopeless conditions faced by Palestinians in Gaza and the occupied territories. Those who think there is a "contradiction" in this position are the ones who are effectively blocking a solution.

In April 2024, Žižek criticized Israel's actions in the Gaza Strip, arguing that Israel's true goal, disguised under claims of eliminating Hamas, was to annex both Gaza and the West Bank.

=== Other ===
Žižek wrote that the convention center in which nationalist Slovene writers hold their conventions should be blown up, adding, "Since we live in the time without any sense of irony, I must add I don't mean it literally."

== Criticism and controversy ==
=== Inconsistency and ambiguity ===
Žižek's philosophical and political positions have been described as ambiguous, and his work has been criticized for a failure to take a consistent stance. While he has claimed to stand by a revolutionary Marxist project, his lack of vision concerning the possible circumstances which could lead to successful revolution makes it unclear what that project consists of. According to John Gray and John Holbo, his theoretical argument often lacks grounding in historical fact, which makes him more provocative than insightful.

In a very negative review of Žižek's book Less than Nothing, John Gray attacked Žižek for his celebrations of violence, his failure to ground his theories in historical facts, and his "formless radicalism" which, according to Gray, professes to be communist yet lacks the conviction that communism could ever be successfully realized. Gray concluded that Žižek's work, though entertaining, is intellectually worthless: "Achieving a deceptive substance by endlessly reiterating an essentially empty vision, Žižek's work amounts in the end to less than nothing."

Žižek's refusal to present an alternative vision has led critics to accuse him of using unsustainable Marxist categories of analysis and having a 19th-century understanding of class. For example, post-Marxist Ernesto Laclau argued that "Žižek uses class as a sort of deus ex machina to play the role of the good guy against the multicultural devils."

In his book Living in the End Times, Žižek suggests that the criticism of his positions is itself ambiguous and multilateral:

I am attacked for being anti-Semitic and for spreading Zionist lies, for being a covert Slovene nationalist and unpatriotic traitor to my nation, for being a crypto-Stalinist defending terror and for spreading Bourgeois lies about Communism... so maybe, just maybe I am on the right path, the path of fidelity to freedom.

Gabriel Rockhill writes that although Žižek is one of the most visible public intellectuals on the left, "...one might assume that the thinker in question is a rightwing ideologue promoted by imperialist think tanks and the U.S. national security state" on account of being "a self-declared Eurocentric", his endorsement of Donald Trump's 2016 presidential campaign, for having "repeatedly taken strong positions against actually existing socialism" in Cuba and China while "he abides by Margret Thatcher’s infamous neoliberal mantra: TINA—There Is No Alternative".

=== Stylistic confusion ===
Žižek has been criticized for his chaotic and non-systematic style: Harpham calls Žižek's style "a stream of nonconsecutive units arranged in arbitrary sequences that solicit a sporadic and discontinuous attention". O'Neill concurs: "a dizzying array of wildly entertaining and often quite maddening rhetorical strategies are deployed in order to beguile, browbeat, dumbfound, dazzle, confuse, mislead, overwhelm, and generally subdue the reader into acceptance." Noam Chomsky deems Žižek guilty of "using fancy terms like polysyllables and pretending you have a theory when you have no theory whatsoever", adding that his views are often too obscure to be communicated usefully to common people.

Conservative thinker Roger Scruton claims that:

To summarize Žižek's position is not easy: he slips between philosophical and psychoanalytical ways of arguing, and is spell-bound by Lacan's gnomic utterances. He is a lover of paradox, and believes strongly in what Hegel called 'the labour of the negative' though taking the idea, as always, one stage further towards the brick wall of paradox.

=== Careless scholarship ===
Žižek has been accused of approaching phenomena without rigour, reductively forcing them to support pre-given theoretical notions. For example, Tania Modleski alleges that "in trying to make Hitchcock 'fit' Lacan, he [Žižek] frequently ends up simplifying what goes on in the films". Similarly, Yannis Stavrakakis criticises Žižek's reading of Antigone, claiming it proceeds without regard for both the play itself and the interpretation, given by Lacan in his 7th Seminar, which Žižek claims to follow. According to Stavrakakis, Žižek mistakenly characterises Antigone's act (illegally burying her brother) as politically radical/revolutionary, when in reality "Her act is a one-off and she couldn't care less about what will happen in the polis after her suicide."

Noah Horwitz alleges that Žižek (and the Ljubljana School to which Žižek belongs) mistakenly conflates the insights of Lacan and Hegel, and registers concern that such a move "risks transforming Lacanian psychoanalysis into a discourse of self-consciousness rather than a discourse on the psychoanalytic, Freudian unconscious."

==== Allegations of plagiarism ====
Žižek's tendency to recycle portions of his own texts in subsequent works resulted in the accusation of self-plagiarism by The New York Times in 2014, after Žižek published an op-ed in the magazine which contained portions of his writing from an earlier book. In response, Žižek expressed perplexity at the harsh tone of the denunciation, emphasizing that the recycled passages in question only acted as references from his theoretical books to supplement otherwise original writing.

In July 2014, Newsweek reported that online bloggers led by Steve Sailer had discovered that in an article published in 2006, Žižek plagiarized long passages from an earlier review by Stanley Hornbeck that first appeared in the journal American Renaissance, a publication condemned by the Southern Poverty Law Center as the organ of a "white nationalist hate group". In response to the allegations, Žižek stated:

The friend send [sic] it to me, assuring me that I can use it freely since it merely resumes another's line of thought. Consequently, I did just that—and I sincerely apologize for not knowing that my friend's resume was largely borrowed from Stanley Hornbeck's review of [Kevin] Macdonald's book. ...In no way can I thus be accused of plagiarizing another's line of thought, of 'stealing ideas'. I nonetheless deeply regret the incident.

== Works ==
=== Filmography ===
| Year | Title |
|---|---|
| 1993 | Laibach: A Film From Slovenia |
| 1996 | Liebe Dein Symptom wie Dich selbst! |
| 1996 | Predictions of Fire |
| 1997 | Post-Socialism+Retro Avantgarde+Irwin |
| 2004 | The Reality of the Virtual |
| 2005 | Zizek! |
| 2006 | The Pervert's Guide to Cinema |
| 2006 | The Possibility of Hope |
| 2008 | Examined Life |
| 2008 | Violence |
| 2009 | Terror! Robespierre and the French Revolution |
| 2009 | Alien, Marx & Co. – Slavoj Žižek, Ein Porträt |
| 2011 | Marx Reloaded |
| 2012 | Catastroika |
| 2012 | The Pervert's Guide to Ideology |
| 2013 | Balkan Spirit |
| 2016 | Risk |
| 2016 | Houston, We Have a Problem! |
| 2018 | Turn On (short) |
| 2021 | Bliss |
| 2026 | The Pervert's Guide to Utopias |
