= Uprising (2012 film) =

- Official Film Poster
- Directed by: Fredrik Stanton
- Produced by: Fredrik Stanton, Alexander Davidis, Samer Ezeldin
- Cinematography: Samer Ezeldin
- Edited by: William James Hamilton
- Production company: Rebellion Films
- Distributed by: Zeitgeist Films
- Release dates: December 8, 2012 (Santa Fe International Film Festival); January 4, 2013
- Running time: 85 minutes
- Country: United States
- Language: English

Uprising is a 2012 documentary that traces the origins of the Egyptian Revolution of 2011 that began in January 2011. It provides a first hand account of the early stages of revolution and follows various leaders and organizers of the movement. The film is directed and produced by Fredrik Stanton and is being distributed by Zeitgeist Films.

== Synopsis ==
The documentary begins with coverage of the spontaneous marches against the 30 year oppressive military rule of president Hosni Mubarak. For the first time in history, organizers and activists turned to social media to voice their opinions and organize protests in Tahrir Square. Though initially a peaceful demonstration, the violence of the police charged with putting down the revolution inspired further violence on both sides as protesters continued to demand that Hosni Mubarak step down from the presidency. When the appointment of the former head of the Egyptian General Intelligence Directorate, Omar Suleiman, as Vice-President was not enough to end protests, Mubarak agreed to step down on February 11, 2011. It was decided that the military would rule for six months until elections could be held. While the film only covers the events leading up to and shortly following the end of the Mubarak regime, the revolution in Egypt continues to this day as new challenges are faced.

== Awards ==
- 2012: CINE - Best Documentary Feature
- 2012: Lone Star Film & Television Awards - Best Documentary Feature
- 2013: St. Louis International Film Festival - Best Documentary
- 2013: Canada International Film Festival - Royal Reel Award
- 2013: Fargo Film Festival - Honorable Mention, Documentary Feature Film
- 2013: Kansas City FilmFest - Best Documentary

== Reception ==
Daniel M. Gold of The New York Times stated, "Among the film's virtues is its analysis of the strategies that channeled the unrest... Uprising is a concise commemoration of a new society's birth pains."
