= Critique of ideology =

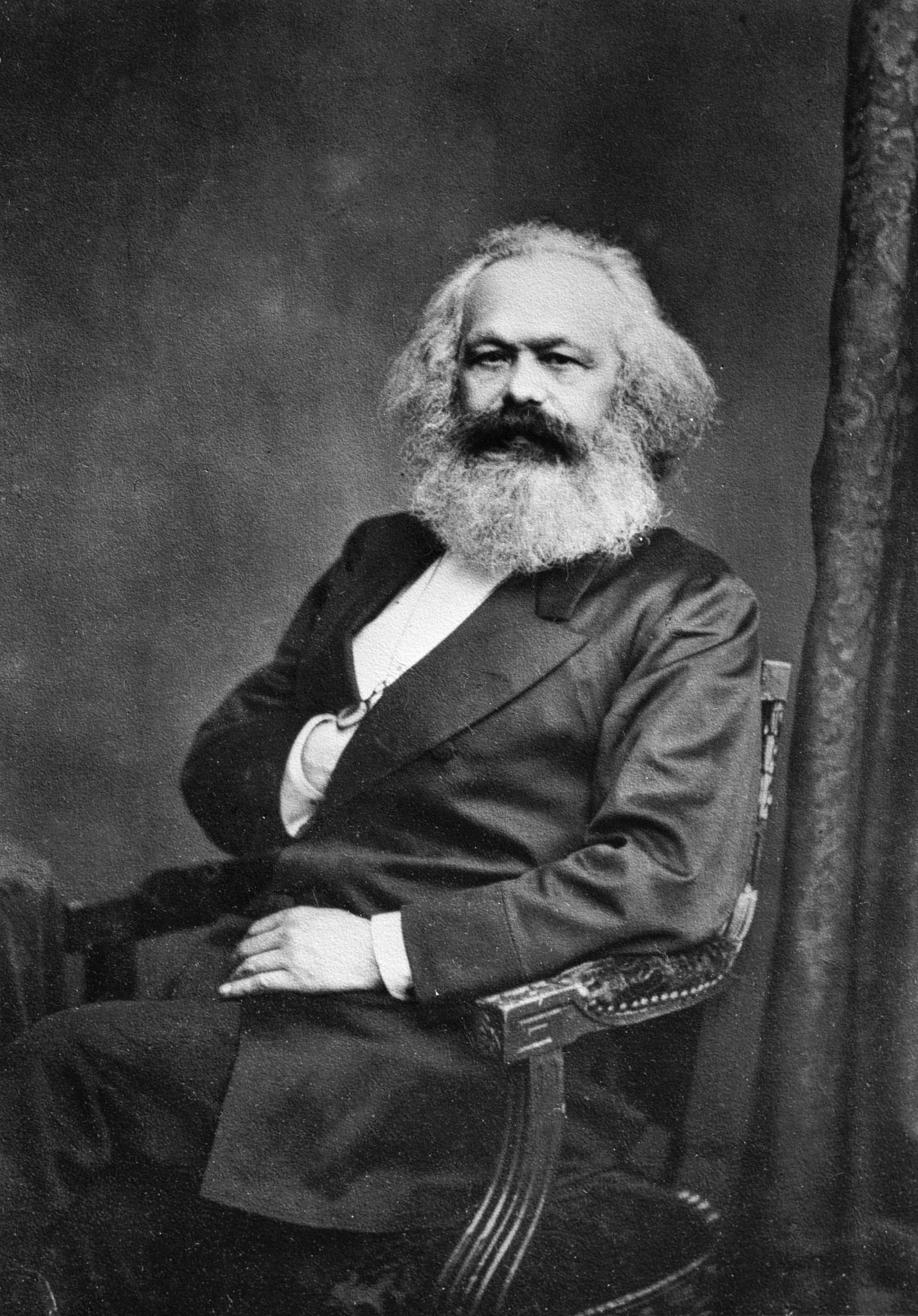
The critique of ideology is rooted in Karl Marx and Friedrich Engels's writings. The above is an 1875 portrait of Marx.

The critique of ideology is a concept used in critical theory, literary criticism, and cultural studies. It focuses on analyzing the ideology found in cultural texts, whether those texts be works of popular culture or high culture, philosophy or TV advertisements. These ideologies can be expressed implicitly or explicitly. The focus is on analyzing and demonstrating the underlying ideological assumptions of the texts and then criticizing the attitude of these works. An important part of ideology critique has to do with “looking suspiciously at works of art and debunking them as tools of oppression”.

== Terminology ==
The critique of ideology has a particular understanding of "ideology," distinct from political perspective or opinions. This specialized meaning comes from the term's root in the works of Karl Marx and Friedrich Engels. For the critique of ideology, ideology is a form of false consciousness. Ideology is a lie about the real state of affairs in the world. In Raymond Williams's words, it is about "ideology as illusion, false consciousness, unreality, upside-down reality".

German philosopher Markus Gabriel defines ideology as "any attempt to objectify the human mind [...] to eradicate the historical dimensions of it, to turn something which is historically contingent, produced by humans, into some kind of natural necessity." In the work of Marx and Engels, ideology was the false belief that capitalist society was a product of human nature, when in reality it had been imposed, often violently, in particular circumstances, in particular places, at particular historical periods.

The term "critique" is also employed in a special manner. Rather than a synonym for criticism, "critique" comes from Immanuel Kant's usage of the term, which meant an investigation into the structures under which we live, think, and act. A critic of ideology, in this sense, is not merely one who expresses disagreement or disapproval, but who is able to bring to light the belief's true conditions of possible existence. Because conditions are constantly changing, showing a belief's existence to be built on mere conditions implicitly shows that they are not eternal, natural, or organic, but are instead historical, contingent, and therefore changeable. Frankfurt School philosopher Max Horkheimer termed a theory critical if it aims "to liberate human beings from the circumstances that enslave them."

== After Marx ==
There is no universally agreed upon definition or model of ideology. The classical and orthodox Marxist definition of ideology is false belief, emergent from the oppressive society which educates its citizens to be obedient workers. The failures of the 1918 revolutions, the rise of Stalinism and fascism, and the explosion of another world war saw a new focus on the importance of ideology among Marxists. Rather than a mere lie of the political-economic establishment, ideology was recognized to be a force in its own right. Wilhelm Reich and later the Frankfurt School complemented Marx's theory of society with Freud's theory of the subject, departing from orthodox Marxism and the Leninist traditions, and setting the foundations of what later came to be called "critical theory."

Reich saw the rise of fascism as an expression of a long-repressed sexuality. Frankfurt School philosopher Theodor W. Adorno wrote in his essay "The Culture Industry: Enlightenment as Mass Deception" how the mass entertainment blunts the possibilities for liberatory action by creating and satisfying false needs.

Interested parties like to explain the culture industry in technological terms. Its millions of participants, they argue, demand reproduction processes which inevitably lead to the use of standard products to meet the same needs at countless locations. The technical antithesis between few production centers and widely dispersed reception necessitates organization and planning by those in control. The standardized forms, it is claimed, were originally derived from the needs of the consumers: that is why they are accepted with so little resistance. In reality, a cycle of manipulation and retroactive need is unifying the system ever more tightly.

Adorno identifies supply and demand reasoning as ideological. It is not merely a false belief: it is a false worldview or philosophy which enables the maintenance of the contingent, historical status quo while appearing to be objective and scientific. A major theme of the Frankfurt School is that those modes of thinking which, at first, are liberatory, may become ideological as time goes on.

== See also ==
- Antonio Gramsci
- Binary opposition
- Cultural hegemony
- Culture industry
- Immanent critique
- Interpellation
- Louis Althusser
  - "Ideology and Ideological State Apparatuses"
- Marxist literary criticism
- Slavoj Žižek
  - The Sublime Object of Ideology
