= The People's Platform =

2014 nonfiction book by Astra Taylor

- Author: Astra Taylor
- Language: English
- Subject: Internet, Media culture, Media studies
- Genre: Nonfiction
- Published: April 2014 (Metropolitan Books)
- Publication place: United States
- Media type: Print
- Pages: 288
- ISBN: 9780805093568
- Text: The People's Platform at the book publisher's website

The People's Platform: Taking Back Power and Culture in the Digital Age is a 2014 book by Astra Taylor. Its central argument "challenges the notion that the Internet has brought us into an age of cultural democracy." The book was the winner of the American Book Award and has been praised by The Boston Globe, Flavorwire, and NY1 News' The Book Reader.

== Summary ==
(From back cover of Picador-published paperback):

The Internet has been hailed as an unprecedented democratizing force. A place where all can participate equally. But how true is this claim? In a seminal dismantling of techno-utopian visions, The People's Platform argues that the Internet in fact amplifies real-world inequities at least as much as it ameliorates them. Online, just as off-line, attention and influence largely accrue to those who already have plenty of both. A handful of giant companies remain the gatekeepers, while the worst habits of the old media model -- the pressure to seek easy celebrity, to be quick and sensational above all -- have proliferated in the ad-driven system.

"We can do better, Astra Taylor insists. The online world does offer a unique opportunity, but a democratic culture that supports work of lasting value will not spring up from technology alone. If we want the Internet to truly be a people's platform, we will have to make it so."

The People's Platform was created to document how the internet has been instrumental in wiping out the "cultural industry’s middle classes" and that the middle class has been "replaced by new cultural plantations ruled over by the West Coast aggregators."

== Writing and Inspiration ==
Astra Taylor credits much of the inspiration behind writing The People's Platform to her work as an independent filmmaker. She cites "frustration with the mainstream media" because they failed to cover subjects and stories that were of concern to Taylor. After, she saw firsthand how the internet is not the "egalitarian or noncommercial paradise" she once believed it was. She mentions concerns about writing critically about technology, as criticism of technology has often been met with resistance.

== Reception ==
The LA Times states that “Taylor makes a thorough case that the technological advances we’ve been told constitute progress—that anyone can start a blog, that we can easily keep up with our friends (and frenemies) on Facebook, that Twitter can foment democratic revolution — are actually masking and, in some cases, exacerbating social ills that have long plagued our society… Compelling and well argued.”

The Boston Globe notes that “Taylor’s smart and nuanced overview of the new media landscape is the best I’ve recently read and an excellent summary of the mess we’re in…. After reading Taylor’s brisk and lucid survey, there’s no denying that in online media, the market is falling short.”

Publishers Weekly writes, “With compelling force and manifest-like style, writer and documentary filmmaker Taylor lays out one of the smartest and most self-evident arguments about the nature and effect of technology in our digital age. Taylor’s provocative book has the power to help shape discussions about the role of technology in our world.”
