= Sunaura Taylor =

American painter, writer and activist for disability and animal rights

- Born: March 21, 1982 (age 44); Tucson, Arizona, U.S.

Sunaura "Sunny" Taylor (born March 21, 1982) is an American academic, painter, writer and activist for disability and animal rights. She currently resides in Oakland, California, and is assistant professor in the department of Environmental Science, Policy, and Management at the University of California, Berkeley.

== Biography ==
A professor at UC Berkeley, Taylor earned her PhD in American Studies from New York University. Her book, Beasts of Burden: Animal and Disability Liberation won the 2018 American Book Award. She has published in both academic and popular outlets.

Taylor's work has been displayed in the Smithsonian and in other important galleries across the United States. She is the recipient of a 2008 Joan Mitchell Foundation Award. In 2004, she received the Grand Prize in the VSA arts Driving Force juried exhibition for emerging disabled artists. A portion of her work deals with animal rights issues, as Taylor is an abolitionist vegan.

Taylor was born with arthrogryposis, and uses a wheelchair. She is active in the Society for Disability Studies and has participated in marches for disability rights. Her work on the disability rights movement has appeared in the Marxist magazine Monthly Review, and her Self Portrait with TCE was the first full-color image ever printed in the publication's long history. She has been featured on All Things Considered on National Public Radio, and the Georgia Public Broadcasting series State of the Arts. Her work has also been featured frequently in Flagpole Magazine in her home town, Athens, Georgia.

Taylor argued her position against animal products in her February 17, 2009 article, "Is It Possible to Be a Conscientious Meat Eater?" and again in her March 29, 2011 article, "Why There's No Such Thing as Humane Meat," both published on AlterNet.

She is also the sister of the filmmaker Astra Taylor, and appeared in her 2008 film Examined Life alongside philosopher Judith Butler.

== Publications ==
- Taylor, Sunaura (2017). Beasts of Burden: Animal and Disability Liberation. The New Press. ISBN 978-1620971284.
- Taylor, Sunaura (May 2024). Disabled Ecologies: Lessons From a Wounded Desert. University of California Press. ISBN 9780520393066.

== See also ==
- List of animal rights advocates
