= Zeitgeist Films =

American independent film distributor

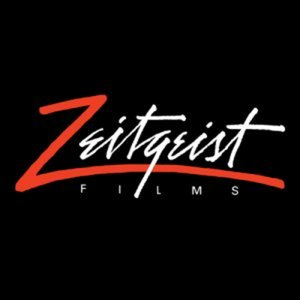
- Zeitgeist Films logo
- Type: Privately held company
- Industry: Film distribution
- Founded: June 1988; 38 years ago
- Founders: Nancy Gerstman; Emily Russo
- Headquarters: New York City, United States
- Key people: Adrian Curry
- Website: zeitgeistfilms.com

Zeitgeist Films is a New York-based distribution company founded in 1988 which acquires and distributes films from the U.S. and around the world. In 2017, Zeitgeist entered into a multi-year strategic alliance with film distributor Kino Lorber.

Zeitgeist has distributed early films by directors such as Todd Haynes, Christopher Nolan, Francois Ozon, Laura Poitras, Atom Egoyan, and the Quay Brothers. Their catalog also includes filmmakers such as Marguerite von Trotta, Ken Loach, Guy Maddin, Derek Jarman, Nuri Bilge Ceylan, Peter Greenaway, Yvonne Rainer, Andrei Zyvagintsev, Astra Taylor, and Raoul Peck. Previous Zeitgeist Films releases in association with Kino Lorber include Ken Loach's Sorry We Missed You, Ric Burns’ Oliver Sacks: His Own Life, and M.C. Escher: Journey to Infinity.

Five Zeitgeist films have been nominated for Academy Awards, of which Nowhere in Africa (2001) won the Academy Award for Best Foreign Language Film. Their films have been featured in various film festivals including Cannes, Berlin, Sundance, Tribeca, and IDFA in Amsterdam. The Museum of Modern Art honored Zeitgeist with a month-long, 20th anniversary retrospective of their films in 2008. Founders Russo and Gerstman received a Lifetime Achievement Award from the Art House Convergence in 2020.

== Selected films ==
Year	Title	Notes	Ref.
1991	Poison	Sundance Grand Jury Prize, directed by Todd Haynes	
1992	Careful	Directed by Guy Maddin	
1993	Blue	Final feature film of director Derek Jarman	
1993	Manufacturing Consent: Noam Chomsky and the Media	Featuring Noam Chomsky	
1997	See the Sea		
2002	Derrida	San Francisco Film Festival Golden Gate Award	
2002	Nowhere in Africa	Academy Award for Best Foreign Language Film	
2004	The Corporation		
2005	Ballets Russes		
2005	Sophie Scholl – The Final Days	Academy Award for Best Foreign Language Film nominee	
2006	Into Great Silence	Sundance Film Festival Special Jury Prize	
2006	Manufactured Landscapes		
2006	My Country, My Country	Documentary about Iraq under U.S. occupation by Laura Poitras	
2007	Billy the Kid	Winner South by Southwest Jury Prize	
2007	Chris & Don: A Love Story		
2007	Jellyfish	Camera d'Or	
2008	Examined Life	Directed by Astra Taylor, featuring Cornel West	
2008	Fados		
2008	Harlan – In the Shadow of Jew Süss		
2008	Louise Bourgeois: The Spider, the Mistress and the Tangerine		
2008	Stranded: I've Come from a Plane that Crashed in the Mountains		
2008	Three Monkeys	Turkey's Academy Award submission for Best Foreign Language Film, directed by Nuri Bilge Ceylan, Best Director Award Cannes Film Festival 2008	
2008	Trouble the Water	Academy Award for Documentary Feature nominee	
2008	Tulpan	Kazakhstan's Academy Award submission for Best Foreign Language Film	
2008	Up the Yangtze	2008 Best Feature Documentary San Francisco International Film Festival, 2009 Canadian Oscar Genie Award for Best Documentary, and 2008 Asian Oscar Golden Horse Film Festival and Awards for Best Documentary	
2009	Act of God	Hot Docs Opening Night Gala	
2009	Afghan Star	Sundance Film Festival People's Choice Award (the World Cinema Audience Award for a Documentary) and Best Director for a Documentary (the World Cinema Directing Award)	
2009	A Town Called Panic	Cannes Film Festival Official Selection, Fantastic Festival Audience Award	
2009	Earth Days	Sundance Film Festival Closing Night Film	
2009	The Horse Boy	Winner South by Southwest Audience Award	
2009	The Sun Behind the Clouds	Winner Palm Springs International Film Festival Best of the Fest award	
2010	Last Train Home	Sundance Film Festival Official Selection	
2010	Mid-August Lunch	Venice Film Festival Best First Film, Best Italian Film Award. London Film Festival Satyajit Ray Award	
2010	The Oath	Sundance Film Festival Best Cinematography Award: US Documentary, Berlin International Film Festival Official Selection	
2010	Vision	Toronto International Film Festival Official Selection	
2011	Bill Cunningham New York	New Directors/New Films Festival Official Selection, Sydney Film Festival Best Documentary Film	
2011	Paul Goodman Changed My Life	October 19, 2011 U.S. theatrical release date	
2011	Queen to Play	Tribeca Film Festival Official Selection, Palm Springs International Film Festival Special Mention for John Schlesinger Award for Outstanding First Feature	
2011	Something Ventured	Premiered April 24, 2011 at the San Francisco International Film Festival	
2011	The Tree	2010 Cannes Film Festival Closing Night Film, Premiered at the 2010 Sydney Film Festival	
2011	!Women Art Revolution	Toronto International Film Festival Official Selection, Sundance Film Festival Official Selection, Berlin International Film Festival Official Selection	
2012	China Heavyweight	January 20, 2012 premiere at Sundance Film Festival	
2012	Elena	May 16, 2012 U.S. theatrical release date	
2012	Gregory Crewdson: Brief Encounters	October 31, 2012 U.S. theatrical release date	
2012	Koch	October 8, 2012 premiere at Hamptons International Film Festival, U.S. release in February 2013	
2012	Let My People Go!	January 11, 2013 U.S. theatrical release date	
2012	Payback	January 20, 2012 premiere at Sundance Film Festival, U.S. release in April 2012	
2012	The Salt of Life	March 2, 2012 U.S. theatrical release date	
2012	Uprising	December 2012 U.S. premiere and Golden Eagle winner at CINE competition	
2013	Hannah Arendt	May 29, 2013 U.S. theatrical release date	
2013	Let the Fire Burn	October 2013 U.S. theatrical release date	
2013	One Track Heart: The Story of Krishna Das	May 8, 2013 U.S. theatrical release date	
2013	The Pervert's Guide to Ideology	November 2013 U.S. theatrical release date	
2014	Child's Pose	February 2014 U.S. theatrical release date	
2014	Diplomacy	October 2014 U.S. theatrical release date	
2014	The Galapagos Affair	April 2014 U.S. theatrical release date	
2014	Rocks in My Pockets	September 2014 U.S. theatrical release date	
2014	Siddharth	June 2014 U.S. theatrical release date	
2014	Zero Motivation	December 2014 U.S. theatrical release date	
2015	Court	July 2015 U.S. theatrical release date	
2015	Every Last Child	June 2015 U.S. theatrical release date	
2015	Forbidden Films	May 2015 U.S. theatrical release date	
2015	My Friend Victoria	December 2015 U.S. theatrical release date	
2016	A Space Program	March 2016 U.S. theatrical release date	
2016	Call Her Applebroog	June 2016 U.S. theatrical release date	
2016	Don't Call Me Son	November 2016 U.S. theatrical release date	
2016	Eva Hesse	April 2016 U.S. theatrical release date	
2016	Innsaei	October 2016 U.S. theatrical release date	
2016	Old Stone	November 2016 U.S. theatrical release date	
2016	Vita Activa: The Spirit of Hannah Arendt	April 2016 U.S. theatrical release date	
2017	Bombshell	November 2017 U.S. theatrical release date—Acquired in Partnership with Kino Lorber	
2017	The Divine Order	October 2017 U.S. theatrical release date—Acquired in Partnership with Kino Lorber	
2017	Harold and Lillian: A Hollywood Love Story	April 2017 U.S. theatrical release date	
2018	Love, Cecil	June 2018 U.S. theatrical release date—Acquired in Partnership with Kino Lorber	
2018	Studio 54	October 2018 U.S. theatrical release date—Acquired in Partnership with Kino Lorber	
2018	The Doctor from India	June 2018 U.S. theatrical release date—Acquired in Partnership with Kino Lorber	
2019	The Garden (re-release)	May 2019 U.S. theatrical release date—Acquired in Partnership with Kino Lorber	
2019	Recorder: The Marion Stokes Project	November 2019 U.S. theatrical release date—Acquired in Partnership with Kino Lorber	
2019	What Is Democracy?	January 2019 U.S. theatrical release date—Acquired in Partnership with Kino Lorber	
2019	Working Woman	March 2019 U.S. theatrical release date—Acquired in Partnership with Kino Lorber	
2019	Zen for Nothing	June 2019 U.S. theatrical release date—Acquired in Partnership with Kino Lorber	
2020	Beyond the Visible -- Hilma af Klint	April 2020 U.S. theatrical release date—Acquired in Partnership with Kino Lorber	
2020	My Wonderful Wanda	April 2020 U.S. theatrical release date—Acquired in Partnership with Kino Lorber	
2020	Sorry We Missed You	March 2020 U.S. theatrical release date—Acquired in Partnership with Kino Lorber	
2020	The Woman Who Loves Giraffes	January 2020 U.S. theatrical release date—Acquired in Partnership with Kino Lorber	
2021	Against the Current	June 2021 U.S. theatrical release date—Acquired in Partnership with Kino Lorber	
2021	Hive	November 2021 U.S. theatrical release date—Acquired in Partnership with Kino Lorber	
2021	In Balanchine's Classroom	September 2021 U.S. theatrical release date—Acquired in Partnership with Kino Lorber	
2023	The Old Oak	Premiered at Cannes Film Festival on May 26, 2023 (Main Competition); April 2024 U.S. theatrical release date—Acquired in Partnership with Kino Lorber	

== Awards ==
- Trouble the Water – 2008 Academy Award Nominee for Best Documentary Feature
- Tulpan – Kazakhstan's 2009 Academy Award submission for Best Foreign Language Film
- Three Monkeys – Turkey's 2009 Academy Award submission for Best Foreign Language Film
- Into Great Silence – 2006 Sundance Special Jury Prize
- Nowhere in Africa – 2002 Academy Award for Best Foreign Language Film
- Sophie Scholl – The Final Days – 2005 Academy Award nominee for Best Foreign Language Film
- Taste of Cherry – 1997 Palme d'Or at the Cannes Film Festival
- Poison – 1991 Sundance Grand Jury Prize winner
- The Umbrellas of Cherbourg (1996 re-release) – Academy Award nominee, Palme d'Or winner (1964)
