= What Is Democracy? =

2019 film

- Directed by: Astra Taylor
- Written by: Astra Taylor
- Produced by: Isaac Linares; Lea Marin
- Cinematography: Maya Bankovic
- Edited by: Robert Kennedy
- Music by: Heather McIntosh
- Production company: National Film Board of Canada
- Distributed by: Zeitgeist Films; Kino Lorber
- Release date: June 9, 2018 (SIDF)
- Running time: 107 minutes
- Country: Canada
- Language: English

What Is Democracy? is a 2018 documentary film written and directed by Astra Taylor. The documentary blends everyday experience and political theory to address questions viewed as central to democracy. Interview subjects include academics, activists, politicians, refugees, trauma surgeons, students, and a barber. While attempting to address the primary question, the documentary also looks at pressing issues of contemporary times, including the Greek debt crisis. In the documentary, Taylor suggests that the current form of democracy is bad and people should seek more direct democracy. Reviewers noted that the documentary never directly answers the title question.

== Summary ==
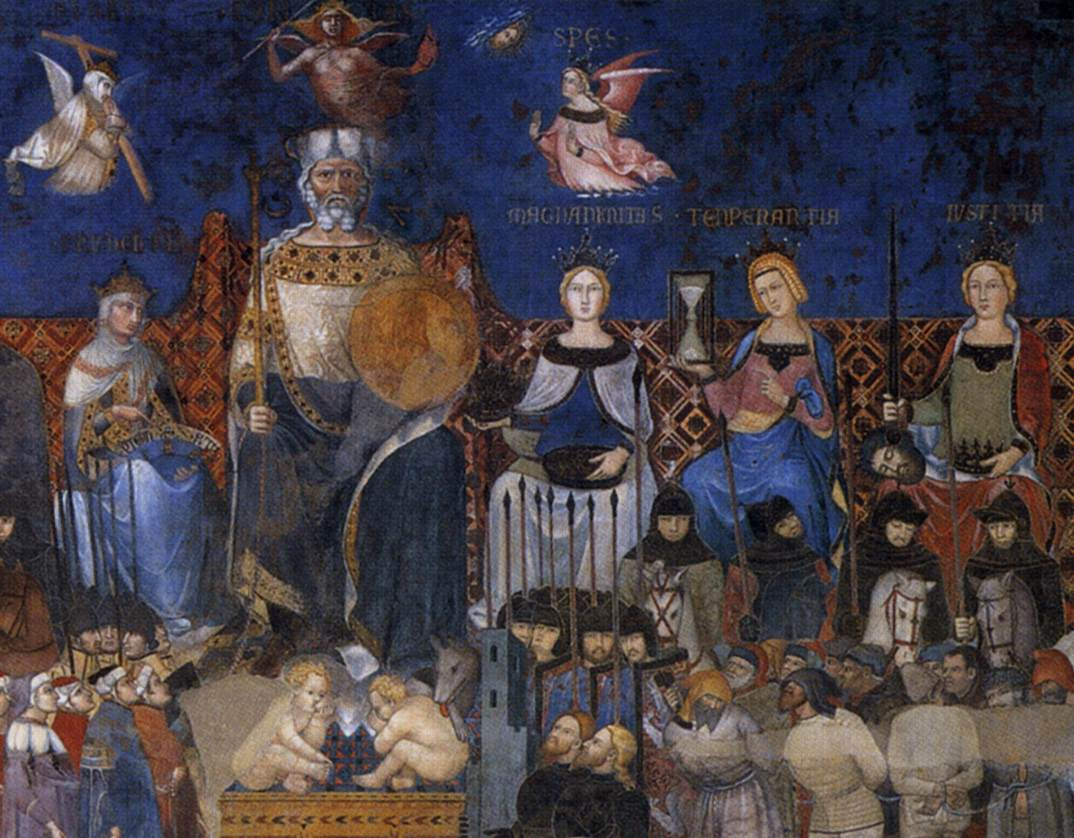
The Allegory of Good and Bad Government is used as a structuring device in the film.

At the beginning of the documentary, Astra Taylor discusses the meaning of The Allegory of Good and Bad Government with Silvia Federici in front of the fresco. In this discussion, Federici highlights that early European democracies recognized that a democracy came with its winners and its losers. The discussion of the fresco is used throughout the film as a structuring device, alongside discussions in important sites of ancient Athens with Efimia Karakantza and quotations from Plato's Republic.

Cornel West builds on the winners and losers that Federici discussed to observe the large number of people left out of modern democracies. He also discusses when important change has come about as an undermining of majority-rule. The documentary then turns to a local healthcare group, operating illegally, as an example of people organizing at a local level to solve problems that no one else is.

Later, Wendy Brown discusses the divide in philosophy between philosophers who prioritize individual bodily security, such as Thomas Hobbes, and philosophers who believed in the possibility of collective action, such as Jean-Jacques Rousseau. Brown also presents the question of how to "make a democratic people out of an undemocratic one" and describes it as "our problem today." The film, however, presents a perspective of the people interviewed as people who are civically minded, even when democratic institutions do not work for them.

== Distribution ==
The film premiered in June 2018 at the Sheffield Doc/Fest, and was screened at the 2018 Toronto International Film Festival and the 2018 Vancouver International Film Festival.

It was released commercially on January 16, 2019.

== Critical reception ==
On Rotten Tomatoes the film has a rating of 96% based on reviews from 26 critics. On Metacritic it has a score of 71% based on reviews from 7 critics.

Gary Goldstein of the Los Angeles Times, viewed the film as a "crucial first step" in "surveying anew where democracy stands — and falls — in our present universe." John Defore reviewed the film for The Hollywood Reporter, finding it to be "unfocused" and "scattered", but nonetheless "consistently engaging". Ben Kenigsberg of The New York Times reviewed the film, saying, "Yet the movie has a tendency to take arguments to overbroad ends (should grade school be a democracy?) and is inevitably unwieldy. It's easy to imagine a more cogent film that weighted either philosophy or reportage more heavily." Charlie Phillips awarded four stars to the film, when reviewing it for The Guardian, writing "An extended and good-looking essay, it serves as a sharp reminder to pay attention to politics and to remember that the personal and the local are political."

The film received a Vancouver Film Critics Circle award nomination for Best Canadian Documentary at the Vancouver Film Critics Circle Awards 2018.
