= Paul Goodman Changed My Life =

- Film Poster
- Directed by: Jonathan Lee
- Produced by: Israel Ehrisman; Robert Hawk; Jonathan Lee; Kimberly Reed
- Music by: Miriam Cutler
- Distributed by: Zeitgeist Films
- Release date: October 19, 2011 (New York)
- Running time: 89 minutes
- Country: United States
- Language: English

Paul Goodman Changed My Life is a 2011 documentary film directed by Jonathan Lee and distributed by Zeitgeist Films.

== Synopsis ==
Paul Goodman Changed My Life is the first documentary feature about Paul Goodman, social activist, lay psychologist, public intellectual and author best known for Growing Up Absurd. The film tells Goodman's story primarily through interviews with his contemporaries, with extensive use of archival footage and personal photographs, as well as readings of his poetry and journals.
