= Building the Commune =

2016 book by George Ciccariello-Maher

Building the Commune: Radical Democracy in Venezuela
- First edition
- Author: George Ciccariello-Maher
- Subject: Nonfiction
- Publisher: Verso Books, Jacobin magazine
- Publication date: 2016
- Media type: Print
- Pages: 138 pp.

Building the Commune is a 2016 book by sociologist and philosopher George Ciccariello-Maher. In this work Maher focuses on the participatory democratic nature of the Venezuelan communal councils focusing on the history of this institution developing within the poor barios of Venezuela during the economic troubles of the 1980s and 1990s and their political growth under the Hugo Chávez presidency.

== Reception ==
According to Stephen Pimpare, "It is a thoughtful, far-ranging, and provocative book, and an important intervention."
