= David H. Bayley =

American political scientist (1933–2020)

- Born: March 26, 1933; New York, NY
- Died: May 10, 2020 (aged 87); Granville, Ohio, U.S.
- Education: Denison University; University of Oxford; Princeton University
- Occupation: Political scientist
- Spouse: Anita Ellis
- Children: 2 daughters

David H. Bayley (March 26, 1933 – May 10, 2020) was an American political scientist who taught at the University of Denver and the State University of New York at Albany. He was dean of SUNY Albany's School of Criminal Justice from 1995 to 2004 and was Distinguished Professor Emeritus. He authored 18 books, and he became a "policing research pioneer." Bayley was described in 2015 as “America’s principal, most respected and longest serving policing expert at-large and the world’s preeminent scholar of international policing studies.”

== Selected works ==
- Bayley, David H.; Mendelsohn, Harold (1968). Minorities and the Police: Confrontation in America. New York: Free Press. OCLC 13034111.
- Bayley, D. H. (1969). Police and Political Development in India. Princeton University Press.
- Bayley, David H., ed. (1977). Police and Society. Beverly Hills, California: SAGE Publications. ISBN 9780803908628. OCLC 490322083.
- Bayley, David H. (1985). Patterns of Policing: A Comparative International Analysis. Brunswick, New Jersey: Rutgers University Press. ISBN 9780813516189. OCLC 27922027.
- Bayley, David H. (1991). Forces of Order: Policing Modern Japan. Berkeley, California: University of California Press. ISBN 9780520072626. OCLC 878023005.
- Bayley, David H., ed. (1998). What Works in Policing. New York: Oxford University Press. ISBN 9780195108200. OCLC 36768022.
- Bayley, David H. (2006). Changing The Guard: Developing Democratic Police Abroad. New York: Oxford University Press. ISBN 9780195189759. OCLC 474405922.
- Bayley, David H.; Perito, Robert (2011). Police Corruption: What Past Scandals Teach About Current Challenges. Washington, D.C.: U.S. Institute of Peace. OCLC 760183850.
