= Jela Krečič =

Slovenian journalist (born 1979)

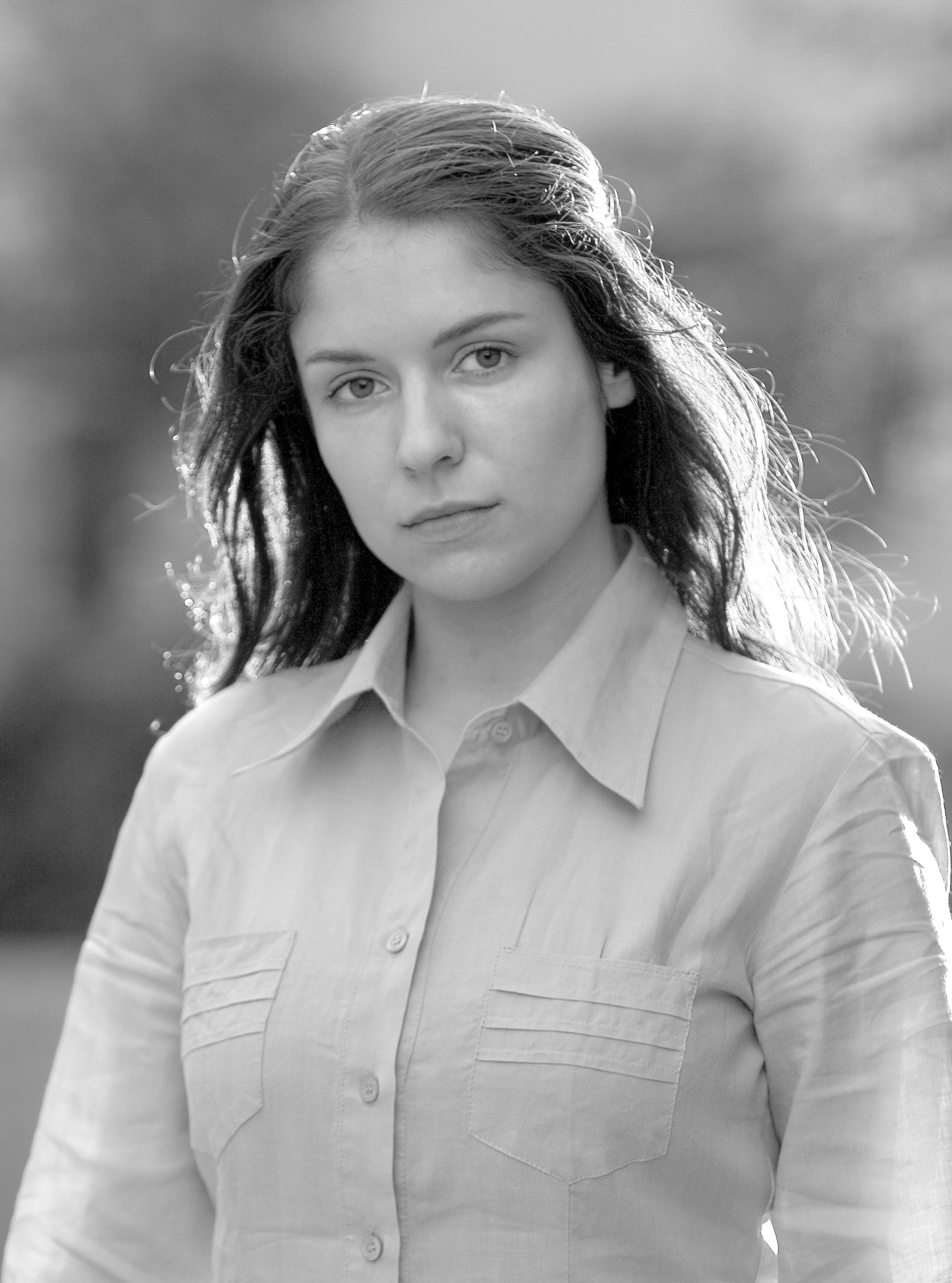
- Krečič in 2005
- Born: February 26, 1979 (age 47); Ljubljana, PR Slovenia, FPR Yugoslavia
- Education: University of Ljubljana (PhD, 2009)
- Occupations: Writer; journalist
- Spouse: Slavoj Žižek (m. 2013)
- Father: Peter Krečič

Jela Krečič Žižek (née Krečič; born February 26, 1979) is a Slovenian writer and journalist.

== Personal life and education ==
Jela Krečič born on 26 February 1979. After graduating from grammar school, she enrolled in the study of cultural studies at the Faculty of Social Sciences in Ljubljana. She graduated in 2002 at the Faculty of Social Sciences of the University of Ljubljana. In 2009, under the mentorship of Mladen Dolar, she earned a PhD in philosophy from the Faculty of Arts.

Her father is the architectural historian Peter Krečič. She has been married to Slavoj Žižek since 2013.

== Career ==
She was employed by the newspaper Delo; in December 2013 her exclusive interview with Julian Assange was published by the newspaper in Slovenian and English. As of 2020 her personal opus, after 2002, includes over 500 bibliographic units.

She has published two books to date: None Like Her (Ni druge) which has been translated into English by Istros Books, and The Book of Others (Knjiga drugih) which was published in 2018 and was nominated for the Kresnik Award. None Like Her is a novel about a Slovenian man's romantic problems against a backdrop of nostalgia for the era of Josip Broz Tito. The Book of Others tells a story around a book that is passed from one character to another and affects their lives despite none of them having read it.
