= ROAR Magazine =

Defunct journal

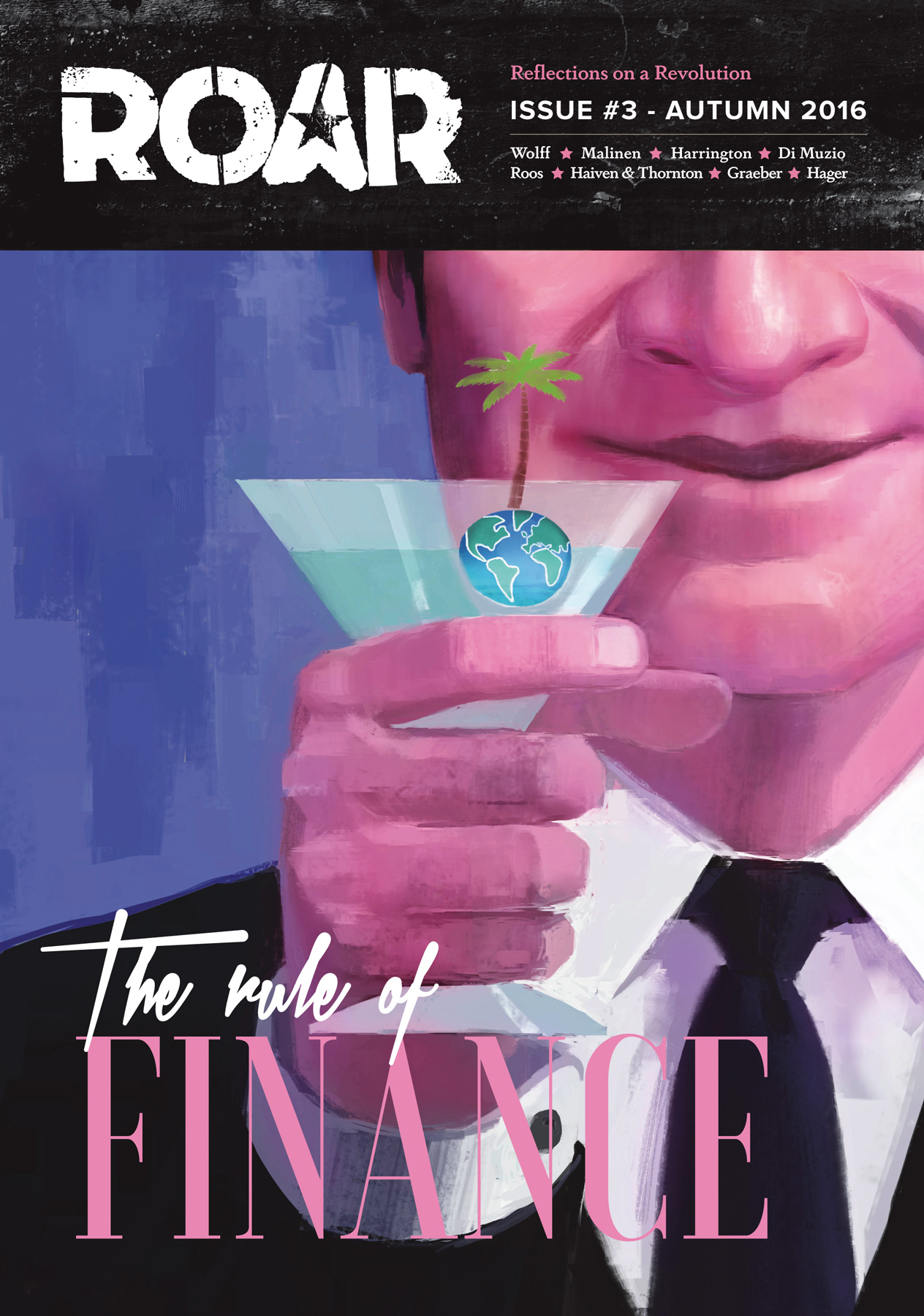
- Cover for ROAR Magazine Issue #3
- Categories: Politics, society
- Frequency: Quarterly
- Circulation: 100,000/month (online)
- Founded: 2010
- Based in: Amsterdam
- Language: English
- Website: roarmag.org
- ISSN: 2468-1695

ROAR Magazine was an independent publication that described itself as a "journal of the radical imagination". Its stated aim was to "provide grassroots perspectives from the front-lines of the global struggle for real democracy".

Founded as an activist blog in 2010, the project expanded into an online magazine and quarterly print journal. In its early years, ROAR particularly discussed the political fallout of the 2008 financial crisis and the social movements that emerged in its wake. The journal covered a broad set of social, political and economic issues.

ROAR announced its closure in April 2022.

== Bibliography ==
- Baker, Mona (2020). "Rehumanizing the migrant: the translated past as a resource for refashioning the contemporary discourse of the (radical) left". Humanities and Social Sciences Communications. 6 (12). doi:10.1057/s41599-019-0386-7. ISSN 2662-9992.
- Buts, Jan (2020). "Community and authority in ROAR Magazine". Humanities and Social Sciences Communications. 6 (16). doi:10.1057/s41599-020-0392-9. ISSN 2662-9992.
- della Porta, Donatella; Mattoni, Alice, eds. (2015). Spreading Protest: Social Movements in Times of Crisis. ECPR Press. ISBN 9781910259207.
- Siapera, Eugenia (2023). "The Challenge of Far-Right Media". In Farrell, Seamus; Siapera, Eugenia; Souvlis, George (eds.). Radical Journalism. Routledge. ISBN 9781003221784.
- Tutek, Hrvoje (2015). "The Form of Resistance: Literary Narration and Contemporary Radical Political Experience". In Habjan, Jernej; Imlinger, Fabienne (eds.). Globalizing Literary Genres. Routledge. ISBN 9781315708621.
