= Diversity in policing =

Diversity in policing or Diversification in policing is a widely proposed policing reform with a difficult to assess impact. The main idea behind the concept is that the correlation between race and gender of officers and civilians and their interactions should be studied. According to the Miami Police Department, the diversity in the police force ensures that policemen are prepared for cultural differences between the force and civilians of different cultural backgrounds. People coming from certain cultures are more likely to communicate better via body language and subtle conversational cues with members of the same culture.

Diversity is based on difference. Key trainings for employee motivation and success in diversity teach that a various combination of human differences is essential to growth in any organization.

== Diversity Training ==
=== Diversity Training in Policing ===
Diversity training is mandatory in many police departments in the United States. Diversity training programs focus on critically examining cultural stereotypes and assumptions. Such trainings examine the ways participants perceive each other. Policing a diverse society, like the ones forming in the United States or Canada, requires an equally diverse police force.

=== Diversity Training in the Department of Justice (Valuing differences mode) ===
The Department of Justice acts in training based on valuing differences between individuals. This approach focuses on helping employees deal with issues created by their differences by becoming open to learn from people they regard as different. The value differences mode stems from the work of Diversity Activities and Training Designs by Julie O'Mara. It consists of four principles.

1. People perform best when they feel valued.
2. People feel the most valued when their differences have been taken into account individually or as in a group.
3. People that have developed the ability to learn from others they regard as different can become fully empowered.
4. Feeling valued and empowered is the key to working together and building relationships between employees and civilians.

These principles have been widely used to shape the understanding in employees in the Department of Justice, regarding of occupation. The main benefits that such a program might entail but is not limited to are increased employee motivation, decrease in diversity-related conflicts, improved morale and increased loyalty, and decreased absenteeism.

== Other studies ==
Similar diversity studies have been conducted in order to increase the productivity and efficiency of both the private and public workforce. A study that McKinsey conducted concluded that companies with a more diverse executive board achieved 53 percent greater Return on equity (ROE). Moreover the EBIT margins were 14 percent higher on these same companies.
