= The Sublime Object of Ideology =

1989 book by Slavoj Žižek

- Cover of the first edition
- Author: Slavoj Žižek
- Language: English
- Subject: Ideology, Marxism, psychoanalysis
- Publisher: Verso Books
- Publication date: December 1989
- Publication place: United Kingdom
- Media type: Print
- Pages: 336
- ISBN: 978-0860919711
- OCLC: 21158412

The Sublime Object of Ideology is a 1989 book by the Slovenian philosopher and cultural theorist Slavoj Žižek. The work is widely considered his masterpiece.

== Summary ==
Žižek thematizes the Kantian notion of the sublime in order to liken ideology to the experience of something that is absolutely vast and powerful beyond all perception and objective intelligibility. Žižek provides an analysis of "How did Marx Invent the Symptom?", in which he compares the ways in which the notion of symptom runs through the work of the philosopher Karl Marx and Sigmund Freud, the founder of psychoanalysis. Žižek opposes any simplistic reading of the two thinkers, who are shown to have discovered the "kernel" of meaning concealed within the apparently unconnected "forms" of commodities (Marx) and dreams (Freud). Žižek thinks it is more important to ask why latent content takes a particular form. Žižek therefore argues that according to both Freud and Marx the dream-work and commodity-form itself require analysis.

== Reception ==
Žižek believes The Sublime Object of Ideology to be one of his best books, while the psychologist Ian Parker writes that it is "widely considered his masterpiece". Anthony Elliott writes that the work is "a provocative reconstruction of critical theory from Marx to Althusser, reinterpreted through the frame of Lacanian psychoanalysis".

== See also ==
- The Pervert's Guide to Ideology
