= Peter Krečič =

Slovenian historian (born 1947)

Peter Krečič (born 24 June 1947) is a Slovenian historian of art and architecture, born in Ljubljana. He is a specialist on the life and work of architect Jože Plečnik, and has published numerous books on this topic, including Plecnik:The Complete Works and Plecnik's Ljubljana. He is the father of the writer Jela Krečič.
