= Astra Taylor =

Canadian-American documentary filmmaker (born 1979)

- Taylor in 2026
- Born: September 30, 1979 (age 47); Winnipeg, Manitoba, Canada
- Education: The New School
- Spouse: Jeff Mangum (m. 2005)
- Relatives: Sunaura Taylor (sister)

Astra Taylor (born September 30, 1979) is a Canadian-American documentary filmmaker, writer, activist, and musician. Taylor has written articles for a range of publications, and is the author or editor of seven books: Examined Life: Excursions with Contemporary Thinkers (2009), Occupy!: Scenes From Occupied America (co-editor with Keith Gessen) (2012), The People's Platform: Taking Back Power and Culture in the Digital Age (2014), Democracy May Not Exist, but We'll Miss It When It's Gone (2019), Remake the World: Essays, Reflections, Rebellions (2020), The Age of Insecurity: Coming Together as Things Fall Apart (CBC Massey Lectures) (2023), End Times Fascism and the Fight for the Living World (with Naomi Klein) (2026).

== Early life and career ==
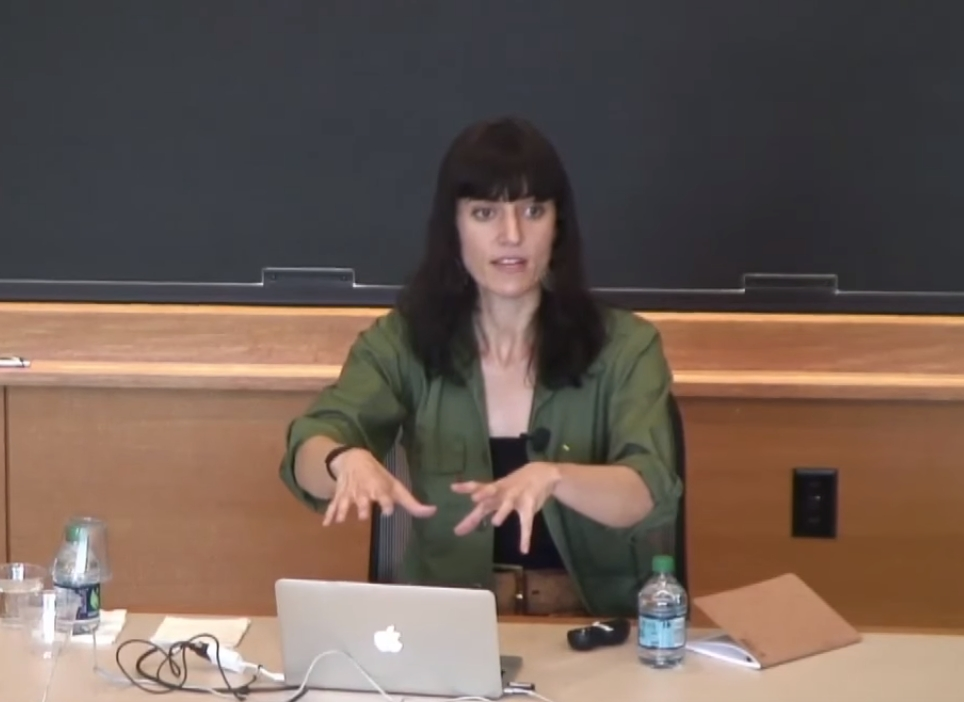
Taylor at the Berkman Klein Center for Internet & Society in 2015

Born in Winnipeg, Manitoba, Taylor grew up in Athens, Georgia, and was unschooled until age 13 when she enrolled in ninth grade. At 16 she abandoned high school to attend classes at the University of Georgia; at the university she studied Deleuze and Guattari under Ronald L. Bogue. Taylor enrolled at Brown University, where she attended classes for a year before dropping out. Taylor completed a Master of Arts in liberal studies at The New School.

Taylor has taught sociology at the University of Georgia and SUNY New Paltz. Her writings have appeared in numerous magazines, including Dissent, n+1, Adbusters, The Baffler, The Nation, Salon, and the London Review of Books. Her book The Age of Insecurity: Coming Together as Things Fall Apart was shortlisted for the Governor General's Award for English-language non-fiction at the 2024 Governor General's Awards. The book was also a finalist for the 2024 Shaughnessy Cohen Prize for Political Writing.

== Activism ==
Taylor was active in the Occupy movement and was the co-editor of Occupy!: An OWS-Inspired Gazette with Sarah Leonard and Keith Gessen. The broadsheet covered Occupy Wall Street in five issues over the course of the first year of the occupation and was later anthologized by Verso Books. Taylor is a co-founder of Debt Collective, a debtors' union fighting to cancel debts. She is a fellow of the Shuttleworth Foundation for her work on challenging predatory debt practices.

Taylor has resisted the label "activist" in her writing. She is a member of the Democratic Socialists of America, and is also on the Progressive International council. She supports a boycott of Israeli cultural institutions, including publishers and literary festivals. She was an original signatory of the manifesto "Refusing Complicity in Israel's Literary Institutions". She has been described as a Marxist in light of her concern with the political economy and the productive forces. In 2026, Taylor endorsed Avi Lewis in that year's federal NDP leadership race.

== Personal life ==
Taylor is the sister of painter and disability activist Sunny Taylor, and is married to Jeff Mangum of Neutral Milk Hotel. She joined Neutral Milk Hotel onstage for a number of shows in 2013 and 2014, playing guitar and accordion. She is a vegan. She lives in New York City.

== Works ==
=== Film ===
- Zizek!, 2005
- Examined Life, 2008
- What Is Democracy?, 2018

=== Writing ===
- Examined Life: Excursions with Contemporary Thinkers (editor), The New Press, 2009, ISBN 9781595584472
- Occupy!: Scenes From Occupied America (co-editor with Keith Gessen), Verso Books, 2012, ISBN 9781844679409
- The People's Platform: Taking Back Power and Culture in the Digital Age, Henry Holt and Company, 2014, ISBN 9780007525591
- "The faux-bot revolution", in A Field Guide to The Future of Work, Royal Society of Arts Future Work Centre, 2018
- Democracy May Not Exist, but We'll Miss It When It's Gone, Metropolitan Books, 2019, ISBN 9781250179845
- Can't Pay, Won't Pay: The Case for Economic Disobedience and Debt Abolition (foreword), Haymarket Books, 2020, ISBN 9781642594003
- Remake the World: Essays, Reflections, Rebellions, Haymarket Books, 2020, ISBN 9781642594546
- The Age of Insecurity: Coming Together as Things Fall Apart (CBC Massey Lectures), House of Anansi Press, 2023, ISBN 978-1-4870-1193-2
- Solidarity: The Past, Present and Future of a World-Changing Idea (with Leah Hunt-Hendrix), Penguin Random House, 2025, ISBN 9780593686997
- End Times Fascism and the Fight for the Living World (with Naomi Klein), Knopf Canada, 2026, ISBN 978-1-0390-5937-5
