= Examined Life =

- Theatrical release poster
- Directed by: Astra Taylor
- Produced by: Ron Mann; Silva Basmajian
- Starring: Cornel West; Slavoj Žižek; Judith Butler; Kwame Anthony Appiah; Michael Hardt; Martha Nussbaum; Avital Ronell; Peter Singer; Sunaura Taylor
- Cinematography: John M. Tran
- Edited by: Robert Kennedy
- Distributed by: Zeitgeist Films
- Release dates: September 5, 2008 (Toronto International Film Festival); February 25, 2009 (United States)
- Running time: 88 minutes
- Country: Canada
- Language: English

Examined Life is a 2008 Canadian documentary film directed by Astra Taylor about philosophers. The film has eight influential modern philosophers walking around New York and other metropolises, discussing the practical application of their ideas in modern culture.

== Featured philosophers ==
The philosophers are Cornel West, Avital Ronell, Peter Singer, Kwame Anthony Appiah, Martha Nussbaum, Michael Hardt, Slavoj Žižek and Judith Butler, who is accompanied by Taylor's sister, the disability activist Sunny (Sunaura Taylor).

== Production and release ==
The film appeared in the 2008 Toronto International Film Festival, the 2009 Melbourne International Film Festival and the 2009 Kingston Canadian Film Festival. It was co-produced by Sphinx Productions and the National Film Board of Canada, in association with the Ontario Media Development Corporation, TVOntario and Knowledge Network.

== Reception ==
Reception has been generally favorable (Rotten Tomatoes gives it 77%), However, Martha Nussbaum subsequently complained in The Point magazine, that although Examined Life displays "a keen visual imagination and a vivid sense of atmosphere and place" it nonetheless "presents a portrait of philosophy that is... a betrayal of the tradition of philosophizing that began, in Europe, with the life of Socrates".

== See also ==
- Žižek!
- Derrida
- Waking Life
- The Ister
