= Ralph Fiennes on screen and stage =

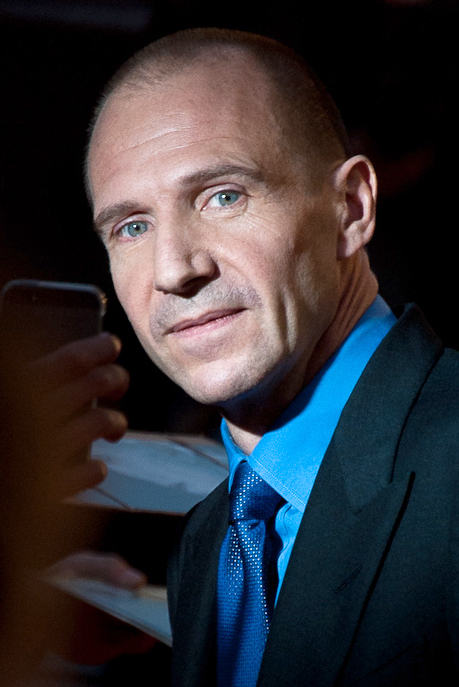
Fiennes in 2013

Ralph Fiennes is an English actor and director who has worked extensively on stage and screen. Regarded as one of the finest performers of his generation, Fiennes is known for his versatile performances across independent films, blockbusters, and the stage. Fiennes trained as an actor at the Royal Academy of Dramatic Art before becoming known as a Shakespeare interpreter, where he excelled onstage at the Royal National Theatre before having further success at the Royal Shakespeare Company. He made his feature film debut portraying Heathcliff in the historical film Emily Brontë's Wuthering Heights (1992).

Fiennes has been nominated for an Academy Award for Best Supporting Actor for his portrayal of Amon Göth in Steven Spielberg's holocaust epic Schindler's List (1993) as well as two Academy Awards for Best Actor for his portrayal of László Almásy in the Anthony Minghella's historical romance The English Patient (1996) and a Cardinal in Edward Berger's religious drama Conclave (2024). Fiennes started his career acting in dramatic films such as Quiz Show (1994), Oscar and Lucinda (1997), The End of the Affair (1999), and Sunshine (1999). He further established himself with acting in diverse films such as Maid in Manhattan (2002), The Constant Gardener (2005), In Bruges, The Duchess, The Reader (all 2008), The Hurt Locker (2009), A Bigger Splash (2015), Hail, Caesar! (2016), The Menu (2022), and 28 Years Later (2025).

He earned critical and awards attention playing against type, taking on the comedic role of a charming concierge in the Wes Anderson comic adventure The Grand Budapest Hotel (2014). He also gained international attention for portraying the villain Lord Voldemort in the Harry Potter film series (2005–2011) and Gareth Mallory / M in the James Bond action franchise films (2012–2021). He is also known for voicing roles in animated films such as The Prince of Egypt (1998), Wallace & Gromit: The Curse of the Were-Rabbit (2005), Kubo and the Two Strings (2016), and The Lego Batman Movie (2017).

Fiennes made his Broadway debut playing Prince Hamlet in the 1995 revival of the William Shakespeare play Hamlet where he won the Tony Award for Best Leading Actor in a Play. He was Tony-nominated for playing a traveling faith healer in the Brian Friel play Faith Healer (2006). On television, he was nominated for the Primetime Emmy Award for Outstanding Lead Actor in a Limited Series or Movie for playing a self-destructive Irish butler Bernard Lafferty in the HBO movie Bernard and Doris (2006). He also acted in the BBC films Page Eight (2001), Turks & Caicos (2014), and Salting the Battlefield (2014).

Fiennes is an Honorary Associate of London Film School and received the Stanislavsky Award in 2019.

== Film ==
Key
†	Denotes films that have not yet been released

Year	Title	Role	Notes
1992	Emily Brontë's Wuthering Heights	Heathcliff	
1993	The Baby of Mâcon	The Bishop's Son	
1993	Schindler's List	Amon Göth	
1994	Quiz Show	Charles Van Doren	
1995	Strange Days	Lenny Nero	
1996	The English Patient	Count László de Almássy	
1997	Oscar and Lucinda	Oscar Hopkins	
1998	The Avengers	John Steed	
1998	The Prince of Egypt	Ramesses	Voice
1999	Sunshine	Ignatz Sonnenschein / Adam Sors / Ivan Sors	
1999	Onegin	Evgeny Onegin	Also executive producer
1999	The End of the Affair	Maurice Bendrix	
1999	The Miracle Maker	Jesus	Voice
2002	Spider	Dennis "Spider" Cleg	
2002	The Good Thief	Tony Angel	Uncredited
2002	Red Dragon	Francis Dolarhyde	
2002	Maid in Manhattan	Christopher Marshall	
2005	The Chumscrubber	Mayor Michael Ebbs	
2005	Chromophobia	Stephen Tulloch	
2005	The Constant Gardener	Justin Quayle	
2005	Wallace & Gromit: The Curse of the Were-Rabbit	Lord Victor Quartermaine	Voice
2005	The White Countess	Todd Jackson	
2005	Harry Potter and the Goblet of Fire	Lord Voldemort	
2006	Land of the Blind	Joe	
2007	Harry Potter and the Order of the Phoenix	Lord Voldemort	
2008	In Bruges	Harry Waters	
2008	The Duchess	William Cavendish	
2008	The Reader	Older Michael Berg	
2009	The Hurt Locker	Contractor Team Leader	
2009	Harry Potter and the Half-Blood Prince	Lord Voldemort	Archival footage
2010	Cemetery Junction	Mr. Kendrick	
2010	Clash of the Titans	Hades	
2010	Nanny McPhee and the Big Bang	Lord Gray	
2010	The Wildest Dream	George Mallory	Documentary
2010	Harry Potter and the Deathly Hallows – Part 1	Lord Voldemort	
2011	Harry Potter and the Deathly Hallows – Part 2	Lord Voldemort	
2011	Coriolanus	Coriolanus	Also director and producer
2012	Wrath of the Titans	Hades	
2012	Skyfall	Gareth Mallory / M	
2012	Great Expectations	Abel Magwitch	
2013	The Invisible Woman	Charles Dickens	Also director
2014	The Grand Budapest Hotel	Monsieur Gustave H.	
2014	Two Women	M.A. Rakitin	
2015	A Bigger Splash	Harry Hawkes	
2015	Spectre	Gareth Mallory / M	
2016	Hail, Caesar!	Laurence Laurentz	
2016	Kubo and the Two Strings	Moon King / Raiden	Voice
2017	The Lego Batman Movie	Alfred Pennyworth	Voice
2017	Sea Sorrow	Prospero	Documentary
2018	The White Crow	Alexander Pushkin	Also director and producer
2018	Holmes & Watson	Professor Moriarty / Jacob Musgrave	
2019	Official Secrets	Ben Emmerson	
2019	The Lego Movie 2: The Second Part	Alfred Pennyworth	Voice; cameo
2020	Dolittle	Barry	Voice
2021	The Dig	Basil Brown	
2021	No Time to Die	Gareth Mallory / M	
2021	The Forgiven	David Henninger	
2021	The King's Man	Orlando, Duke of Oxford	Also executive producer
2022	The Menu	Chef Julian Slowik	
2023	The Wonderful Story of Henry Sugar	Roald Dahl / The Policeman	Short film
2023	The Swan	Roald Dahl	Short film
2023	The Rat Catcher	Roald Dahl / Rat Man	Short film
2023	Poison	Roald Dahl	Short film
2023	Coast	Self	Short film
2024	Macbeth: Ralph Fiennes & Indira Varma	Macbeth	Stage recording
2024	Conclave	Cardinal Thomas Lawrence	Also executive producer
2024	The Return	Odysseus	
2025	28 Years Later	Dr. Ian Kelson	
2025	The Choral	Dr. Guthrie	
2026	28 Years Later: The Bone Temple	Dr. Ian Kelson	
2026	The Hunger Games: Sunrise on the Reaping	President Coriolanus Snow	
TBA	Embers †	Henrik	Filming

== Television ==
Year	Title	Role	Notes
1991	Prime Suspect	Michael	2 episodes
1992	A Dangerous Man: Lawrence After Arabia	T. E. Lawrence	Television film
2003	Liberty's Kids	Charles Cornwallis	Voice, 1 episode
2008	Bernard and Doris	Bernard Lafferty	Television film
2011	Page Eight	Alec Beasley	Television film
2011–2014	Rev.	Bishop of London	2 episodes
2014	Turks & Caicos	Alec Beasley	Television film
2014	Salting the Battlefield	Alec Beasley	Television film
2022	Harry Potter 20th Anniversary: Return to Hogwarts	Himself	Television special

== Theatre ==
Year	Title	Role	Venue	Ref.
1985	Twelfth Night	Curio	Regent's Park Open Air Theatre, London	
1985	A Midsummer Night's Dream	Cobweb	Regent's Park Open Air Theatre, London	
1986	A Midsummer Night's Dream	Lysander	Regent's Park Open Air Theatre, London	
1986	Romeo and Juliet	Romeo	Regent's Park Open Air Theatre, London	
1987	Six Characters in Search of an Author	Son	Royal National Theatre, London	
1987	Fathers and Sons	Arkady Nikolayevich Kirsanov	Royal National Theatre, London	
1987	Ting Tang Mine	Lisha Ball	Royal National Theatre, London	
1988	Much Ado About Nothing	Claudio	Stratford-upon-Avon	
1988–1989	The Plantagenets: Henry VI, The Rise of Edward IV, Richard III His Death	Henry VI	Stratford-upon-Avon; Barbican Centre, London	
1989	King John	Dauphin	Stratford-upon-Avon; The Pit Theatre, London	
1989	The Man Who Came to Dinner	Bert Jefferson	Barbican Centre, London	
1989	Playing with Trains	Gant	The Pit Theatre, London	
1990	Troilus and Cressida	Troilus	Stratford-upon-Avon	
1990	King Lear	Edmund	Stratford-upon-Avon	
1991	Love's Labour's Lost	King of Navarre	Stratford-upon-Avon; Barbican Centre, London	
1995	Hamlet	Prince Hamlet	Hackney Empire, London; Belasco Theatre, Broadway	
1997	Ivanov	Ivanov	Almeida Theatre, London	
2000	Coriolanus	Coriolanus	BAM Harvey Theatre, Brooklyn	
2000	Richard II	Richard II	BAM Harvey Theatre, Brooklyn	
2001	The Play What I Wrote	Sir Ralph Fiennes	Wyndham's Theatre, London's West End	
2003	The Talking Cure	Carl Jung	Royal National Theatre, London	
2003	Brand	Brand	Stratford-upon-Avon; Theatre Royal Haymarket, London	
2005	Julius Caesar	Mark Antony	Barbican Centre, London and tour	
2006	Faith Healer	Francis Hardy	Gate Theatre, Dublin; Booth Theatre, Broadway	
2007	First Love		Sydney Festival	
2008	God of Carnage	Alain Reille	Gielgud Theatre, London	
2008	Oedipus the King	Oedipus	Royal National Theatre, London	
2011	The Tempest	Prospero	Theatre Royal Haymarket, London	
2013	National Theatre: 50 Years on Stage	Lambert Le Roux (Pravda)	Royal National Theatre, London	
2015	Man and Superman	Jack Tanner	Royal National Theatre, London	
2016	The Master Builder	Halvard Solness	The Old Vic, London	
2016	Richard III	Richard, Duke of Gloucester	Almeida Theatre, London	
2018	Antony and Cleopatra	Antony	Royal National Theatre, London	
2020	Beat the Devil	Performer	Bridge Theatre, London	
2021	Four Quartets	Performer	Theatre Royal, Bath/Tour	
2022	Straight Line Crazy	Robert Moses	Bridge Theatre, London; The Shed, Off-Broadway	
2023	Macbeth	Macbeth	The Depot, Liverpool; Royal Highland Centre, Edinburgh; Dock X, London; Shakespeare Theatre Company, Washington, D.C.	
2025	Grace Pervades	Henry Irving	Theatre Royal, Bath	
2025	Small Hotel	Larry	Theatre Royal, Bath	
2026	Eugene Onegin		Opéra de Paris	Director
2026	Grace Pervades	Henry Irving	Theatre Royal Haymarket, London	

== Video games ==
Year	Title	Voice role	Notes
2005	Harry Potter and the Goblet of Fire	Lord Voldemort	
2007	Harry Potter and the Order of the Phoenix	Lord Voldemort	
2015	James Bond: World of Espionage	M	Mobile game

== Theme park attractions ==
Year	Title	Role	Venue
2014	Harry Potter and the Escape from Gringotts	Lord Voldemort	Universal Studios Florida

== Spoken word ==
- When Love Speaks (2002, EMI Classics) – "Sonnet 129" ("Th'expense of spirit in a waste of shame")

== See also ==
- List of awards and nominations received by Ralph Fiennes
- List of British actors
- List of British film directors
- List of English speaking theatre directors in the 20th and 21st centuries
- List of Academy Award winners and nominees from Great Britain
- List of actors with Academy Award nominations
- List of actors with more than one Academy Award nomination in the acting categories
