= List of awards and nominations received by Ralph Fiennes =

Ralph Fiennes awards and nominations
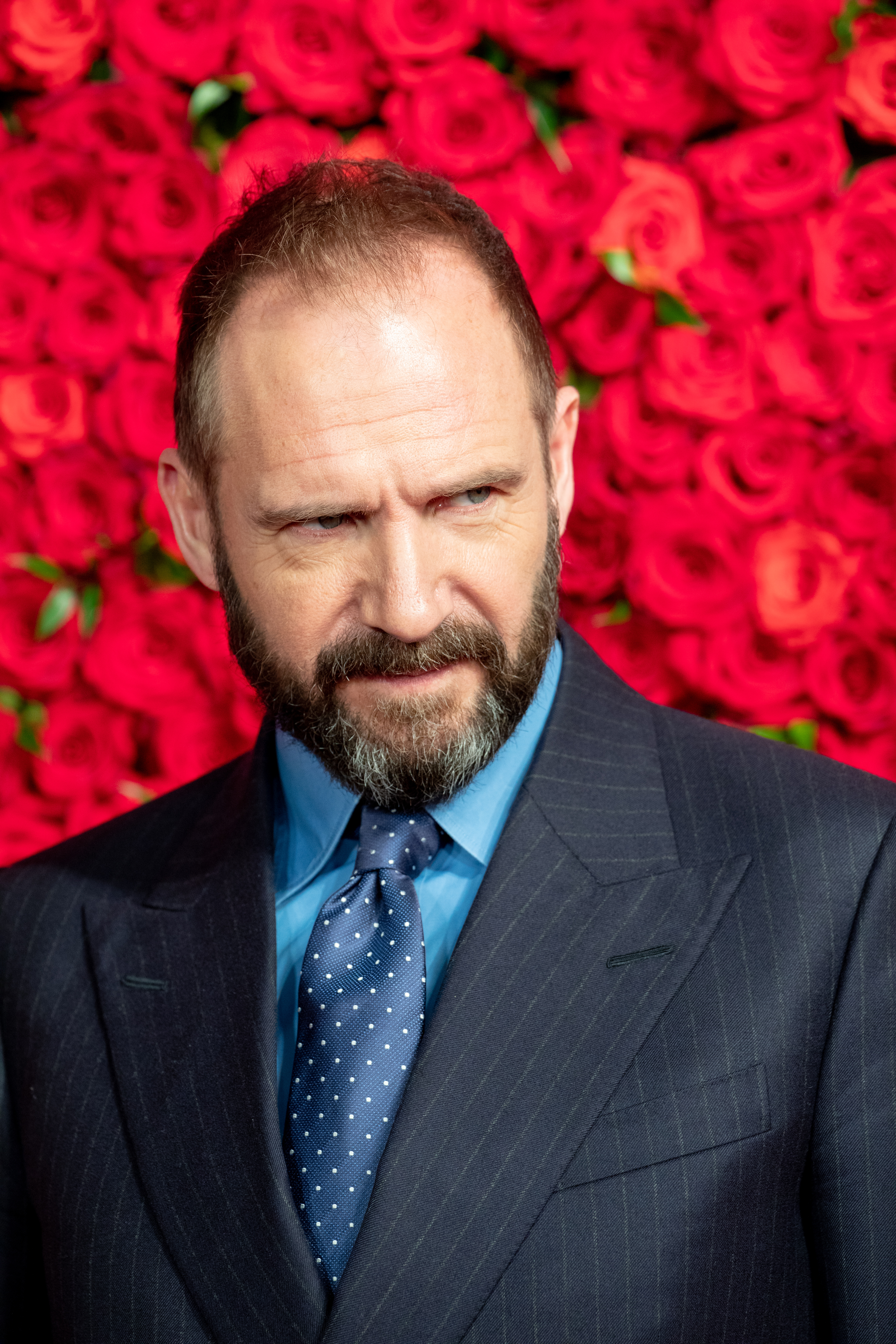
- Fiennes at the Tokyo International Film Festival 2018.
Awards and nominations
Award	Wins	Nominations
Academy Awards	0	3
Actor Awards	1	6
BAFTA Awards	1	7
Critics' Choice Awards	1	5
Emmy Awards	0	1
Golden Globe Awards	0	7
Tony Awards	1	2

Totals (Note: Certain award groups do not simply award one winner. They acknowledge several different recipients, have runners-up, and have third place. Since this is a specific recognition and is different from losing an award, runner-up mentions are considered wins in this award tally. For simplification and to avoid errors, each award in this list has been presumed to have had a prior nomination.)
- Wins: 14
- Nominations: 57

Ralph Fiennes is an English actor and director. Known for his intense and versatile roles on stage and screen, he has received numerous accolades including a BAFTA Award, a Critics' Choice Movie Award, an Actor Award and a Tony Award as well nominations for three Academy Awards, a Primetime Emmy Award, and seven Golden Globe Awards.

Fiennes made his film debut playing Heathcliff in Emily Brontë's Wuthering Heights (1992). The following year, Fiennes received widespread acclaim for his portrayal of sadistic Nazi officer Amon Göth in the Steven Spielberg-directed Holocaust drama Schindler's List (1993) for which he earned the BAFTA Award for Best Actor in a Supporting Role as well as nominations for the Academy Award and the Golden Globe Award. For playing László Almásy in Anthony Minghella's romantic war drama The English Patient (1996), he received Best Lead Actor nominations for the Academy Award, Actor Award, BAFTA Award, and the Golden Globe Award. He played the romantic lead in the Neil Jordan romantic dramaThe End of the Affair (1999), and a British diplomat attempting to solve the murder of his wife in the Fernando Meirelles thriller The Constant Gardener (2005) earning nominations for the BAFTA Award for Best Actor in a Leading Role for both.

Fiennes made his directorial debut with Coriolanus (2011) earning a nomination for the Outstanding Debut by a British Writer, Director or Producer. He played William Cavendish in the period drama The Duchess (2008) earning a Golden Globe Award for Best Supporting Actor – Motion Picture nomination. Fiennes took a rare comedic role as an refined and flirty concierge in the Wes Anderson comedy The Grand Budapest Hotel (2014) earning nominations for the BAFTA Award, the Critics' Choice Movie Award, and the Golden Globe Award for Best Actor. He played a sinister Chef in the dark comedy The Menu (2022) receiving a nomination for the Golden Globe Award for Best Actor in a Motion Picture – Musical or Comedy. He played a cardinal undergoing a crisis of faith in the drama Conclave (2024) earning nominations for the Academy Award, the BAFTA Award, the Critics' Choice Movie Award, the Golden Globe Award, and the Actor Award for Best Actor.

On television, Fiennes portrayed an Irish butler Bernard Lafferty in the HBO television movie Bernard and Doris (2006) for which he was nominated for the Primetime Emmy Award, the Golden Globe Award, and the Actor Award. On stage, he received the Tony Award for Best Leading Actor in a Play for playing the title role in a revival of the William Shakespeare tragedy Hamlet (1995). He was further Tony-nominated for playing a faith healer in the Brian Friel play Faith Healer (2006). Fiennes is an Honorary Associate of London Film School and received the Richard Harris Award in 2011, and the Stanislavsky Award in 2019.

== Major associations ==
=== Academy Awards ===
Year	Category	Nominated work	Result	Ref.
1994	Best Supporting Actor	Schindler's List	Nominated	
1997	Best Actor	The English Patient	Nominated	
2025	Best Actor	Conclave	Nominated	

=== Actor Awards ===
Year	Category	Nominated work	Result	Ref.
1997	Outstanding Cast in a Motion Picture	The English Patient	Nominated	
1997	Outstanding Actor in a Leading Role	The English Patient	Nominated	
2009	Outstanding Actor in a Miniseries or Television Movie	Bernard and Doris	Nominated	
2015	Outstanding Cast in a Motion Picture	The Grand Budapest Hotel	Nominated	
2025	Outstanding Cast in a Motion Picture	Conclave	Won	
2025	Outstanding Actor in a Leading Role	Conclave	Nominated	

=== BAFTA Awards ===
Year	Category	Nominated work	Result	Ref.
British Academy Film Awards
1994	Best Actor in a Supporting Role	Schindler's List	Won	
1997	Best Actor in a Leading Role	The English Patient	Nominated	
2000	Best Actor in a Leading Role	The End of the Affair	Nominated	
2006	Best Actor in a Leading Role	The Constant Gardener	Nominated	
2012	Outstanding Debut By A British Writer, Director or Producer	Coriolanus	Nominated	
2015	Best Actor in a Leading Role	The Grand Budapest Hotel	Nominated	
2025	Best Actor in a Leading Role	Conclave	Nominated	

=== Critics' Choice Awards ===
Year	Category	Nominated work	Result	Ref.
Critics' Choice Movie Awards
2015	Best Actor	The Grand Budapest Hotel	Nominated	
2015	Best Actor in a Comedy	The Grand Budapest Hotel	Nominated	
2015	Best Acting Ensemble	The Grand Budapest Hotel	Nominated	
2025	Best Actor	Conclave	Nominated	
2025	Best Acting Ensemble	Conclave	Won	
Critics' Choice Super Awards
2023	Best Actor in a Horror Movie	The Menu	Won	
2026	Best Actor in a Horror Movie	28 Years Later: The Bone Temple	Won	

=== Emmy Awards ===
Year	Category	Nominated work	Result	Ref.
Primetime Emmy Awards
2008	Outstanding Lead Actor in a Miniseries or Movie	Bernard and Doris	Nominated	

=== Golden Globe Awards ===
Year	Category	Nominated work	Result	Ref.
1994	Best Supporting Actor – Motion Picture	Schindler's List	Nominated	
1997	Best Actor – Motion Picture Drama	The English Patient	Nominated	
2009	Best Supporting Actor – Motion Picture	The Duchess	Nominated	
2009	Best Actor – Miniseries or Television Film	Bernard and Doris	Nominated	
2015	Best Actor – Motion Picture Musical or Comedy	The Grand Budapest Hotel	Nominated	
2023	Best Actor – Motion Picture Musical or Comedy	The Menu	Nominated	
2025	Best Actor – Motion Picture Drama	Conclave	Nominated	

=== Tony Awards ===
Year	Category	Nominated work	Result	Ref.
1995	Best Lead Actor in a Play	Hamlet	Won	
2006	Best Lead Actor in a Play	Faith Healer	Nominated	

== Miscellaneous awards ==
Organization	Year	Category	Work	Result	Ref.
AACTA International Awards	2025	Best Actor	Conclave	Won	
Annie Awards	1999	Outstanding Achievement for Voice Acting in a Feature Production	The Prince of Egypt	Nominated	
Annie Awards	2006	Outstanding Achievement for Voice Acting in a Feature Production	Wallace & Gromit: The Curse of the Were-Rabbit	Nominated	
Berlin International Film Festival	2011	Golden Bear	Coriolanus	Nominated	
British Independent Film Awards	2005	Best Actor	The Constant Gardener	Won	
British Independent Film Awards	2008	Best Supporting Actor	In Bruges	Nominated	
British Independent Film Awards	2008	Best Supporting Actor	The Duchess	Nominated	
British Independent Film Awards	2011	Richard Harris Award	—N/a	Honored	
British Independent Film Awards	2011	Douglas Hickox Award for Best Debut Director	Coriolanus	Nominated	
European Film Awards	1999	European Actor	Sunshine	Won	
European Film Awards	2002	People's Choice Award for Best European Actor	Spider	Nominated	
European Film Awards	2018	European Achievement in World Cinema	—N/a	Honored	
European Film Awards	2024	European Actor	Conclave	Nominated	
Filmfest München	2019	CineMerit Award	—N/a	Honored	
Genie Awards	2000	Best Performance by an Actor in a Leading Role	Sunshine	Nominated	
Göteborg Film Festival	2014	Honorary Dragon Award	—N/a	Honored	
Gotham Awards	2009	Best Ensemble Performance (Note: (shared with Jeremy Renner, Anthony Mackie, Brian Geraghty, Guy Pearce, David Morse, Evangeline Lilly))	The Hurt Locker	Won	
IFTA Film & Drama Awards	2009	Best International Actor	The Duchess	Nominated	
IFTA Film & Drama Awards	2025	Best International Actor	Conclave	Won	
Independent Spirit Awards	2017	Best Supporting Male	A Bigger Splash	Nominated	
Palm Springs International Film Festival	2025	Ensemble Performance Award	Conclave	Honored	
Santa Barbara International Film Festival	2025	Outstanding Performer of the Year Award	Conclave	Honored	
Satellite Awards	1997	Best Actor in a Motion Picture Drama	The English Patient	Nominated	
Satellite Awards	2008	Best Actor in a Miniseries or a Motion Picture Made for Television	Bernard and Doris	Nominated	
Satellite Awards	2023	Best Actor in Motion Picture, Comedy or Musical	The Menu	Nominated	
Satellite Awards	2025	Best Actor in a Motion Picture Drama	Conclave	Nominated	
Saturn Awards	1996	Best Actor	Strange Days	Nominated	
Saturn Awards	2003	Best Supporting Actor	Red Dragon	Nominated	
Saturn Awards	2012	Best Supporting Actor	Harry Potter and the Deathly Hallows – Part 2	Nominated	
Saturn Awards	2024	Best Actor in a Film	The Menu	Nominated	
Tokyo International Film Festival	2018	Best Artistic Contribution	The White Crow	Won	

== Critics associations ==
Organization	Year	Category	Work	Result	Ref.
Boston Society of Film Critics	1993	Best Supporting Actor	Schindler's List	Won	
Chicago Film Critics Association	1993	Best Supporting Actor	Schindler's List	Won	
Chicago Film Critics Association	1993	Most Promising Actor	Schindler's List	Nominated	
Chicago Film Critics Association	2024	Best Actor	Conclave	Nominated	
Dallas–Fort Worth Film Critics Association	1993	Best Supporting Actor	Schindler's List	Won	
Dallas–Fort Worth Film Critics Association	2024	Best Actor	Conclave	Won	
Evening Standard British Film Awards	2006	Best Actor	The Constant Gardener	Won	
Evening Standard Theatre Awards	2015	Evening Standard Theatre Award for Best Actor	Man and Superman	Nominated	
Evening Standard Theatre Awards	2016	Evening Standard Theatre Award for Best Actor	The Master Builder and Richard III	Won	
Evening Standard Theatre Awards	2018	Evening Standard Theatre Award for Best Actor	Antony and Cleopatra	Won	
London Film Critics' Circle	1995	British Actor of the Year	Schindler's List	Won	
London Film Critics' Circle	2001	British Actor of the Year	The End of the Affair	Nominated	
London Film Critics' Circle	2003	British Actor of the Year	Spider	Nominated	
London Film Critics' Circle	2006	British Actor of the Year	The Constant Gardener	Won	
London Film Critics' Circle	2009	British Actor of the Year	The Duchess	Nominated	
London Film Critics' Circle	2023	British/Irish Actor of the Year	The Forgiven and The Menu	Nominated	
London Film Critics' Circle	2025	Actor of the Year	Conclave	Won	
Los Angeles Film Critics Association	1993	Best Supporting Actor	Schindler's List	Runner-up	
New York Film Critics Circle	1993	Best Supporting Actor	Schindler's List	Won	
Online Film Critics Society	2024	Best Actor	Conclave	Won	
San Diego Film Critics Society	2024	Best Actor	Conclave	Nominated	
Seattle Film Critics Society	2024	Best Lead Actor	Conclave	Nominated	
Toronto Film Critics Association	2014	Best Actor	The Grand Budapest Hotel	Runner-up	
Toronto Film Critics Association	2016	Best Supporting Actor	A Bigger Splash	Runner-up	
Toronto Film Critics Association	2024	Outstanding Lead Performance	Conclave	Runner-up	

== See also ==
- Ralph Fiennes on screen and stage
- List of British actors
- List of British film directors
- List of English speaking theatre directors in the 20th and 21st centuries
- List of Academy Award winners and nominees from Great Britain
- List of actors with Academy Award nominations
- List of actors with more than one Academy Award nomination in the acting categories
