= Andrew Levitas =

American artist and filmmaker (born 1977)

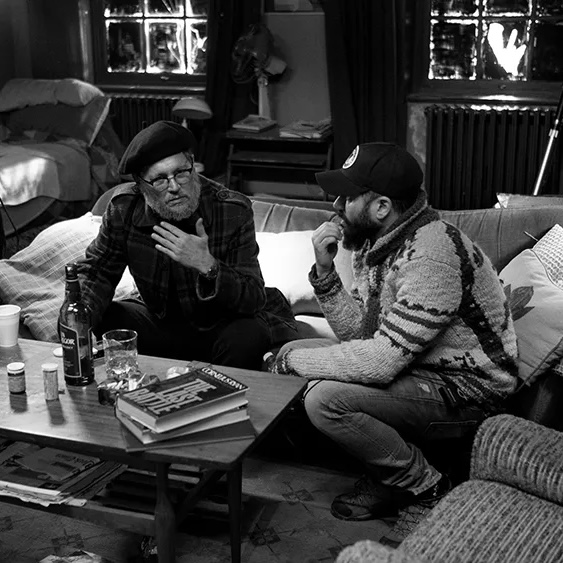
- Levitas (right) with Johnny Depp on set for Minamata in 2024
- Born: Andrew James Levitas September 4, 1977 (age 48); New York City, US
- Education: Horace Mann School; Dalton School
- Alma mater: New York University (BA)
- Occupations: Painter; sculptor; filmmaker; actor; writer; producer; photographer; restaurateur
- Years active: 1997–present
- Known for: Photographic sculpting, painting
- Spouse: Katherine Jenkins (m. 2014)
- Children: 2

Andrew James Levitas (born September 4, 1977) is an American filmmaker, painter, sculptor, actor, writer, producer, photographer and restaurateur.

== Early life ==
Levitas was born in New York City. He attended Horace Mann School and then Dalton School in Manhattan. After graduating from the Dalton School, he attended New York University. He graduated in 2000 with a degree from the Gallatin School of NYU. He is Jewish.

== Art career ==
=== Photographic sculpture ===
The New York Times declared that social impact artist Andrew Levitas “has the Midas touch” when describing his continued work across multiple creative platforms. Levitas has been a mainstay on the New York and European art scene for over two decades. In 2004 Levitas produced his "Metalwork Experiment". Metalwork Photography photographic sculptures are formed by a process involving the transfer of photographs onto custom transparencies that are in turn melted onto hand detailed sheets. Levitas’ installations are each composed of multi-paneled interlocking metal sheets whose collective impact transcends their individual materiality. Other works included in the exhibition are crumpled sheets of metal that resonate with John Chamberlain's mangled installations, inspired by the action abstract expressionist paintings that typified the Post-War New York School. However, as opposed to Chamberlain's incorporation of ready-mades, Levitas' creation and subsequent disfiguration of his own artwork adds a performative twist to his artwork that situates it at the vanguard of contemporary art. The result is a work that combines the imagery of a photograph with the presence of a sculpture. While these works are printed as editions, they function as unique objects since each print differs, depending on the level of hand tooling.

Levitas’ work has also garnered attention through top auction houses, museums, and art fairs. 2012 highlights include a solo exhibition Metalwork Photograph: Sculptures at Phillips de Pury in Manhattan, as well as a ten-year retrospective Andrew Levitas: A Brief Survey 2002–2012 at New York University. 2014 highlights include the first solo exhibition ever presented at the highly anticipated Phillips, Berkeley Square, which included examples of Levitas's earlier two-dimensional artwork in which he successfully fused metalwork and photography, as well as examples of the artist's more recent works depicting crumpled sheets and three-dimensional freestanding installations, all made in his distinctive and innovative style. Levitas' work has been showcased worldwide. Most notably, his work has been acquired by museums including the National Museum Wales and 10 Downing Street and he is one of only a handful of American artists accepted to show with the Société Nationale des Beaux-Arts at the Louvre. Levitas' most recent sculptural work on environmental pollution debuted with a solo exhibition at the Goulandris Museum of Contemporary Art in Athens, where he was artist-in-residence in 2021. Upcoming museum exhibitions include Lisbon, London, and Tel Aviv.

=== Paintings ===
Levitas’ "organic abstractions" (paintings built from home-made pigments, canvas, and organic materials – in some cases entire trees) have also received critical acclaim. The work, often reflective of Los Angeles life, is in part a commentary on emotion and the way we choose to express ourselves, as well as the ways in which we insulate ourselves from essential truth. The work also stresses a larger discourse on nature, the organic and its place in the contemporary world.

Levitas’s fine art engages with the same environmental and inspirational themes that are seen in his films.

=== Brand Collaborations ===
Levitas has worked on a number of collaborations with like minded brands — In 2015 Levitas created the CUBA X LEVITAS as part of an artist collaboration with the skate brand Supra.

== Film career ==
Levitas wrote and directed the critically acclaimed 2020 feature film Minamata, which follows photojournalist W. Eugene Smith (Johnny Depp) who travels to the Japanese coastal town of Minamata to expose corporate negligence and government cover-ups by documenting one of the world’s most devastating environmental disasters. Minamata had its gala premiere at Berlinale 2020, where it was acquired for theatrical distribution by MGM in 2021 with a subsequent Academy Award campaign. At the 94th Academy Awards in 2022, the film ranked third place in the Oscars Fan Favorite contest. On review aggregator Rotten Tomatoes, the film scored 78%.

When MGM suppressed the release of the film due to the #MeToo allegations against the lead actor, Johnny Depp, several photojournalists and industry figures publicly expressed support for Minamata, highlighting the significance of its focus on victims of corporate pollution and environmental issues.

The film received dazzling reviews for both the production and Depp's performance. The LA Times wrote, "Taken on its own merits — as an accessible if ahistorical dramatization of an environmental tragedy — Minamata does what it sets out to do very well" The Guardian called the film, "a forthright, heartfelt movie, an old-fashioned 'issue picture' with a worthwhile story to tell about how communities can stand up to overweening corporations and how journalists dedicated to truthful news can help them". Greenpeace, commenting on why you should watch Minamata now, said, “Whether you like it or not, no one lives without environmental or human rights issues. The happy ending may still be ahead. But the journey is not endless. Everyone could do something and make their own contribution.”

Prior to Minamata, Levitas wrote and directed Lullaby (2014 film) which stars Amy Adams, Richard Jenkins, Terrence Howard, Jennifer Hudson and Garrett Hedlund. The film, an exploration of patients’ rights, was described by Pete Hammond (Deadline) as a “strong human drama” with “Jenkins a true actor’s actor, delivering a very Oscar-worthy supporting turn.” The premiere of the film was held at the Museum of Modern Art in New York City.

In 2017 he produced British film The White Crow written by David Hare and directed by Ralph Fiennes. It stars Oleg Ivenko as the ballet dancer Rudolf Nureyev, chronicling his life and dance career. It is inspired by the book Rudolf Nureyev: The Life by Julie Kavanagh. It premiered at the 2018 Telluride Film Festival and the 2018 BFI London Film Festival. The film also screened at the Tokyo International Film Festival, Cinemania (Bulgaria) and Febiofest (Czech Republic). Ralph Fiennes received the Special Achievement Award for Outstanding Artistic Contribution at the Tokyo International Film Festival, with the film receiving a Tokyo Grand Prix nomination. The film was released on March 22, 2019, in the UK (StudioCanal) and on April 26, 2019, in the US (Sony Pictures Classics). The New York Times wrote “The White Crow is a portrait of the artist as a young man, an attempt to show the complex array of factors — biographical, psychological, social, political — that led to the moment when the 23-year-old dancer made a decision that would change the history of ballet: Nureyev became Nureyev by defecting from Russia to the West at Le Bourget airport in France in June 1961… Throughout [the film], Fiennes and Hare suggest the extraordinary will and curiosity that drove Nureyev to dance, and to seek out art and culture wherever he could.”

Levitas brought to life director Adewale Akinnuoye-Agbaje’s own story in Farming . Screen Daily wrote of the film, “Actor turned director Adewale Akinnuoye-Agbaje makes an arresting feature debut with Farming. Told with raw emotion and lurid violence, it transforms elements of his life story into a disturbing, eye-opening coming of age drama.” Farming premiered at the 2018 Toronto International Film Festival on 8 September in the Discovery Section. The film won the Michael Powell Award at the 2019 Edinburgh Film Festival. Lionsgate UK released the film in the United Kingdom on 11 October 2019, followed by a United States release on 25 October.

In 2018, Levitas produced My Zoe from writer and director Julie Delpy. My Zoe premiered at the 2019 Toronto International Film Festival as part of the Platform Prize program. IndieWire raved that “Delpy’s ability to believe in both her audience and her wild story remains compelling throughout the film... Delpy earns every minute of the story, one that shows off her ability (and desire) mix things up with a fresh eye.”

Levitas produced 2019 film Georgetown from Christoph Waltz in his feature directorial debut. Georgetown had its world premiere at the Tribeca Film Festival on April 27, 2019. The Hollywood Reporter praised the film, noting that "it's the kind of serious but broadly appealing, modestly scaled picture that people love to say doesn't exist any more."

Levitas created the highly acclaimed Comic book “Eternus” with filmmaker Andy Serkis. The book was launched at New York Comic Con and was subsequently picked up by Simon and Schuster for global distribution.****

== Academic career ==
Also a part-time professor at New York University, Levitas has taught a course called "The Artist's Mind" for over a decade. In addition, Levitas has guest lectured at universities internationally, including Yale University. Recently, Levitas taught a masterclass at the Goulandris Foundation in Athens as the Artist in Residence, alongside other environmentalists, as well at the Barbican in 2023. He continues to teach worldwide.

== Personal life ==
Since October 2013, Levitas has been in a relationship with British classical-crossover singer Katherine Jenkins. The pair were engaged in April 2014, and married at Hampton Court Palace on September 27, 2014. Jenkins gave birth to the couple's first child, a daughter, in September 2015. With his wife, Levitas wrote the song "8 Nights of Joy," which was recorded at Abbey Road Studios and was on her album "Home Sweet Home." Their son was born in April 2018. Levitas was previously co-owner of West Village hotspot Play and is current part-owner of SoHo restaurants Little Prince and Lola Taverna.

== Cygnet Gin ==
In 2022, Levitas launched Cygnet Distillery Gin in partnership with his wife. Cygnet is produced near Katherine’s childhood home in Wales and currently sold in the UK.

=== Awards ===
- Cygnet Gin has been both nominated for and received numerous awards, including:
- 2023 International Wine & Spirits (IWSC) - Cygnet Welsh Dry Gin & Tonic (Gold)
- 2023 International Wine & Spirits (IWSC) - Cygnet 22 (Gold, Ultra Premium Gin)
- 2023 World Beverage Innovation Awards - Cygnet 22 (Best Glass Design)
- 2023 World Beverage Innovation Awards - Cygnet 22 (Best Alcohol Beverage)
- 2024 Spirits Business Luxury Masters - Cygnet 22 (Masters)
- 2024 World Gin Awards - Cygnet 22 (Design Best Bottle)
- 2024 World Gin Awards - Cygnet 22 (Signature Botanicals Gold)

== Social Impact ==
Levitas has been an outspoken advocate on environmental protection and wildlife conservation and has spoken on these issues at numerous events around the world. In 2020, Levitas was joined by Frans Timmermans, Executive Vice President of the European Commission, and Jeremy Wates, Secretary General, European Environmental Bureau, and others at the European Environmental Bureau and gave a speech on strategies for sustainability. In 2021, Levitas spoke at UNEP’s Cop 4 Indonesia - with Senior Policy Coordination Officer, Claudia Ten Have. In June 2023, Levitas presented and spoke at the Cop-5 Briefing hosted by the United Nations Environment Programme (UNEP), alongside others including Monika Stankiewicz of the Minamata Convention, Kenneth Davis of the Chemicals and Health branch of UNEP and Christian Hofer of the Global Environment Facility. Levitas also joined jury members and winners of the #MakeMercuryHistory photography contest at the United Nations Environment Programme to share unique perspectives on the role of photography in driving positive change and how it can deepen our commitment to preserving the human health and the environment from the toxic effects of mercury. Levitas is also the global patron for the Wilderness Foundation and an Ambassador of Tusk Trust.

== Filmography ==
=== Producer ===
- At Any Price (2012) (co-producer)
- Great Neck (2013) (producer)
- Regular Boy (2014) (producer)
- Below the Surface (2011) (producer)
- The Art of Getting By (2011) (executive producer)
- Bad Actress (2011) (co-executive producer)
- Searching for Glitter (2009) (associate producer)
- Innocence (2014) (producer)
- Affluenza (2014) (Executive Producer)
- Flower (2017) (executive producer)
- The White Crow (2018) (producer)
- Farming (2018) (producer)
- My Zoe (2019) (producer)
- Last Moment of Clarity (2019) (producer)
- Georgetown (2019) (producer)
- The Quarry (2019) (executive producer)
- Last Moment of Clarity (2020) (producer)
- The Gateway (2021) (producer, writer)

=== Actor ===
- Bad Actress (2011) .... George Apodaca
- The Art of Getting By (2011) .... Javier
- Holy Rollers (2010) .... David
- The Box (2009/I) .... Black Op
- Entourage .... Gregg (1 episode, 2009)
- Friendly Fire (2006) ... Dastardly Handsome
- Beauty Shop (2005) .... Stacy
- Hellbent (2004) .... Chaz
- North Shore .... Reese (1 episode, 2004)
- It's All Relative .... Eddie Donovan (1 episode, 2003)
- Psycho Beach Party (2000) .... Provoloney
- Boy Meets World .... Luther (1 episode, 1999)
- Party of Five .... Cameron Welcott (6 episodes, 1999)
- The Nanny .... Michael Brolin (4 episodes, 1998–1999)
- Nick Freno: Licensed Teacher .... Marco Romero (21 episodes, 1997–1998)
- In & Out (1997) .... Locker Room Guy

=== Director ===
- Lullaby (2013) (director & writer)
- Minamata (2020) (director & producer)
