= Nigerian prince =

Nigerian prince may refer to:

- Nigerian traditional rulers or, specifically, the junior dynasts of their royal houses in the broader Nigerian Chieftaincy
- Nigerian prince, a type (or stereotype) of advance-fee scammer
- Nigerian Prince (film), a 2018 Nigerian-American film
