= Curvature (disambiguation) =

Curvature refers to mathematical concepts in different areas of geometry.

Curvature may also refer to:

- Curvature LLC, a network hardware company
- Human vertebral column, curvature of the spine
- Curvatures of the stomach, curvatures of the stomach
- Figure of the Earth, curvature of the Earth
- Degree of curvature, degree of curvature used in civil engineering
- Curvature (2017 American film), directed by Diego Hallivis
