= The Gateway (2021 film) =

- Theatrical release poster
- Directed by: Michele Civetta
- Screenplay by: Alexander Felix Bendaña; Michele Civetta; Andrew Levitas
- Story by: Alexander Felix Bendaña
- Produced by: Andrew Levitas; Stephen Israel
- Starring: Shea Whigham; Olivia Munn; Zach Avery; Taryn Manning; Mark Boone Junior; Keith David; Frank Grillo; Bruce Dern
- Cinematography: Bryan Newman
- Edited by: Suzy Eimiger; Trish Fuller
- Music by: Alec Puro
- Production companies: Grindstone Entertainment Group; Metalwork Pictures
- Distributed by: Lionsgate
- Release date: September 3, 2021
- Running time: 91 minutes
- Country: United States
- Language: English

The Gateway is an American crime thriller film directed by Michele Civetta and starring Shea Whigham, Olivia Munn and Frank Grillo. The screenplay, written by Alexander Felix and originally titled Where Angels Die, was included in the 2013 Black List. The film was released in theaters and on VOD on September 3, 2021.

== Plot ==
A troubled but dedicated social worker, assisting a working and struggling single mother and her daughter, intervenes when the father returns from prison and drags his family back to his habitual world of crime.

== Cast ==
- Shea Whigham as Parker Jode
- Olivia Munn as Dahlia Montrose
- Zach Avery as Mike Montrose
- Bruce Dern as Marcus Jode
- Frank Grillo as Duke Harmaday
- Alex Wraith as Louis
- Taegen Burns as Ashley Montrose
- Jackson James as Tommy
- Shannon Adawn as Detective King
- Nicholas Daly as Detective Bachman
- Mike O'Connell as Stu
- Taryn Manning as Corey Belton
- Mark Boone Junior as Gary Wolfbock
- Keith David as Terry Thompson

== Production ==
The film was shot in Norfolk, Virginia in May 2019.

== Release ==
The film was released in selected theaters and on video-on-demand on September 3, 2021 in the United States.

== Reception ==
The review aggregator website Rotten Tomatoes surveyed 37 critics and, categorizing the reviews as positive or negative, assessed 19 as positive and 18 as negative for a 51% rating.
