= The Devil Below =

- Film poster
- Directed by: Brad Parker
- Written by: Stefan Jaworski; Eric Scherbarth
- Story by: Eric Scherbarth
- Produced by: Diego Hallivis; Julio Hallivis; Alejandro De Leon; Andres Rosende
- Starring: Alicia Sanz; Adan Canto; Zach Avery; Chinaza Uche; Jonathan Sadowski; Jesse LaTourette; Will Patton
- Cinematography: Morgan Susser
- Edited by: David Kashevaroff
- Music by: Nima Fakhrara
- Production company: 1inMM Productions
- Distributed by: Vertical Entertainment
- Release date: March 5, 2021
- Running time: 88 minutes
- Country: United States
- Language: English

The Devil Below is a 2021 American horror film directed by Bradley Parker. The film stars Alicia Sanz, Adan Canto, Zach Avery, Chinaza Uche, Jonathan Sadowski, Jesse LaTourette and Will Patton.

It was released on March 5, 2021, by Vertical Entertainment.

== Plot ==
A mining crew is leaving the Shookum Hills Coal Mine when an unknown creature attacks Eric, the son of miner Schuttmann. Schuttmann attempts to save him, but the creature stabs him in the throat, paralysing him. A bloodied Eric is taken away screaming.

Years later, a team of scientists—Darren, Shawn, Terry, and Jaime—led by adventurer Arianne, searches for Shookum Hills and its abandoned coal mines. The town disappeared from maps in the 1970s, and its population seemingly vanished. It is believed that the disappearance was connected to an underground coal fire that caused sinkholes to form around the town. Darren believes the fires were caused by a rare mineral.

After buying supplies, Arianne asks a shopkeeper for directions to Shookum Hills. He denies knowing the town and orders her to turn back, then secretly warns someone about the group's presence. A car follows them, but Arianne evades it and reaches a dirt road blocked by an electrical fence. The group climbs over it and discovers the abandoned mine. They find a sinkhole enclosed by an improvised electrified barrier, dismantle it, and lower sensors into the hole. Terry is suddenly dragged inside. Arianne and Jaime descend after him but cannot find him. A local, Dale, confronts Darren and Shawn, demanding to know why they opened the sinkhole. When Dale cuts their rope, Shawn knocks him unconscious.

Arianne returns and warns that there is “something else” in the tunnels. The group takes Dale's truck and flees, but crashes into a pothole and continues on foot through the woods. Shawn is killed by one of the creatures, while Dale reports that the sinkhole has been breached before being killed himself. Darren, Arianne, and Jaime are rescued by locals led by Schuttman, the former owner of the mines. He reveals that monsters inhabit the tunnels and were the true reason for the town's disappearance. The remaining townspeople have stayed behind to keep the creatures contained.

Arianne volunteers to return to the sinkhole with locals Ellroy and Shelby, accompanied by Darren and Jaime. The creatures ambush them, and Ellroy sacrifices himself to allow the others to escape into the tunnels. Shelby then distracts the creatures so the others can flee. Jaime attempts to kill several creatures with a grenade, but one knocks it from his hand, and he dies when it detonates.

Darren confesses that the expedition was not intended to map the area, as he had claimed. He is being paid by a coal mining company seeking the rare mineral in the caves. Refusing to continue, he leaves Arianne, who promises to return with help. She reaches the surface but is paralysed and captured by a creature. She awakens briefly on a raft being steered by a creature, alongside Shelby's corpse. At the creatures' lair, she finds Darren and Shawn alive. Shawn explains that the creatures breed and colonise like ants or bees, before being fed to their queen, a bloated and immobile creature. Arianne is also brought before the queen, but recovers from the venom and uses a grenade given to her by Darren to kill it.

Afterwards, Arianne and Darren escape and climb a rope towards the surface, but a creature attacks them. Arianne gives Darren a knife, but he is poisoned and cuts the rope to save her, sacrificing himself. The locals arrive, and Schuttman stops one of them from cutting the rope and killing Arianne. They help her escape, then use flamethrowers and rifles to force the creatures back into the tunnels.

Meanwhile, Schuttmann drives Arianne towards the fence. He tells her about Eric's death and asks her to help keep the creatures contained. Although uncertain that they can defeat the monsters, Arianne reluctantly agrees to help.

== Cast ==
- Alicia Sanz as Arianne
- Adan Canto as Darren
- Will Patton as Schuttmann
- Zach Avery as Jaime
- Chinaza Uche as Shawn
- Jonathan Sadowski as Terry
- Jesse LaTourette as Shelby
- William Mark McCullough as Dale
- Alpha Trivette as Ellroy
- Tom Proctor as Kip
- Nathan Phillips as Cain

== Production ==
Plans to film The Devil Below, then titled Shookum Hills, were first announced in 2018. The film went into production in May 2018 in Kentucky, based on a script written by Eric Scherbarth and Stefan Jaworski.

== Release ==
The Devil Below was given a limited theatrical release in the United States on March 5, 2021, alongside a VOD release on the same date in the United States.

== Reception ==
The Devil Below holds a rating of 15% on Rotten Tomatoes, based on 13 reviews.
