= A Good Person =

2023 film by Zach Braff

- Theatrical release poster
- Directed by: Zach Braff
- Written by: Zach Braff
- Produced by: Zach Braff; Pamela Koffler; Florence Pugh; Christine Vachon; Christina Piovesan; Noah Segal
- Starring: Florence Pugh; Morgan Freeman; Celeste O'Connor; Molly Shannon; Chinaza Uche; Zoe Lister-Jones
- Cinematography: Mauro Fiore
- Edited by: Dan Schalk
- Music by: Bryce Dessner
- Production companies: Killer Films; Elevation Pictures
- Distributed by: Metro-Goldwyn-Mayer Pictures (through United Artists Releasing)
- Release dates: March 8, 2023 (The Ham Yard Hotel, London); March 24, 2023 (United States)
- Running time: 129 minutes
- Country: United States
- Language: English
- Box office: $3.1 million

A Good Person is a 2023 American drama film written, directed, and produced by Zach Braff. The film stars Florence Pugh, Morgan Freeman, Celeste O'Connor, Molly Shannon, and Chinaza Uche.

Aspiring musician Allison's life suddenly, drastically falls apart following a fatal accident, and her road to acceptance and recovery is arduous.

A Good Person was released in the United States on a limited theatrical release on March 24, 2023, before a wide expansion on March 31, 2023, by Metro-Goldwyn-Mayer. The film received a mixed response from critics.

== Plot ==
Allison is an aspiring musician, engaged to her high school boyfriend, Nathan. The day following their engagement party, Allison gets into a car crash while driving with her eyes off the road, killing Nathan's sister Molly and Molly's husband, and sustaining critical injuries herself.

One year later, dealing with severe depression and unable to deal with her guilt, Allison lives with her mother Diane, who attempts to curb her daughter's addiction to pain pills. Meanwhile, Nathan and Molly's ex-cop father Daniel is taking care of his granddaughter Ryan. She also is still processing the loss of her parents.

After failing to get drugs illicitly from her friend Becka, and after a humiliating encounter with two high school acquaintances that leads her into a downward spiral, Allison joins an AA group. There, she unexpectedly encounters Daniel, who reveals in a meeting that his drinking resulted in repeated blackouts where he would not remember his violent behavior. On one such occasion, he destroyed the hearing in Nathan's ear.

Ryan, in her turn, is bullied for her status as an orphan and in trouble for her behavior. When Allison meets Daniel at his house, while leaving she is confronted by Ryan about Allison's direct responsibility for her parents’ deaths. This causes her to relapse.

Ryan invites Allison to a concert, as well as Nathan, who brings his new paralegal girlfriend. Allison is devastated, perceiving it as a cruel act by Ryan, and accompanies her to an after-party where she relapses again. Allison is unable to protect Ryan from being taken advantage of in a back room, but Daniel arrives drunk and puts an end to it, threatening Ryan’s potential rapist with a handgun.

During the altercation, Nathan steps in front of the gun, talking his father down from his relapsed state. Outside, Daniel confesses that he considered Allison a test from God. Now he perceives her as a waste and insults her before hailing a cab.

After accepting her role in the crash, Allison is able to move toward recovery and checks herself into a rehab centre. A year later, Allison is writing songs again, and she and Nathan reacquaint themselves. Daniel passes away, leaving Ryan in Nathan and Allison's care until she leaves for college, and Allison attends the funeral where she discovers Daniel's letter to her explaining his thoughts and that the Latin translation of his tattoo "amor fati" is "to love one's fate". After the wake, Ryan and Allison embrace sitting on the front door stoop.

== Cast ==
- Florence Pugh as Allison
- Morgan Freeman as Daniel
- Celeste O'Connor as Ryan
- Molly Shannon as Diane
- Chinaza Uche as Nathan
- Zoe Lister-Jones as Simone
- Nichelle Hines as Molly
- Toby Onwumere as Jesse
- Ignacio Diaz-Silverio as Quinn
- Oli Green as Thomas
- Alex Wolff as Mark
- Brian Rojas as Diego
- Ryann Redmond as Becka
- Sydney Morton as Joelle

Other appearances include Drew Gehling as Max, Jessie Mueller as Sandra Keen, Shirley Rumierk as Dr. Gonzalez, Cary Brothers as himself, Charlene Kaye as bassist, and Jackie Hoffman as Belinda.

== Production ==
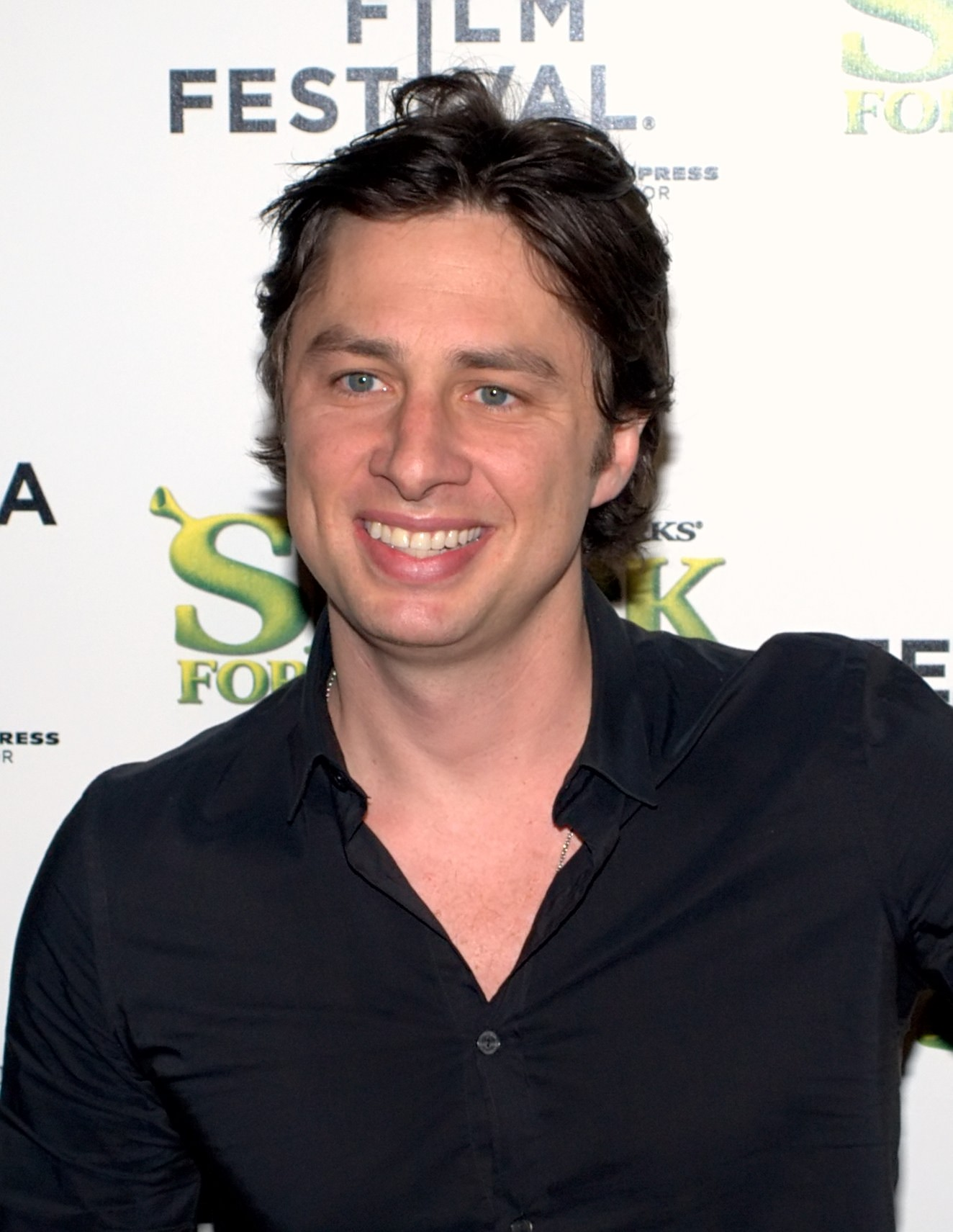
Writer, director, and producer Zach Braff

On February 26, 2021, it was reported Zach Braff would write and direct A Good Person, a drama starring Florence Pugh and Morgan Freeman. By March 2021, Metro-Goldwyn-Mayer (MGM) was in negotiations to acquire the rights to the film in territories including North and Latin America, Scandinavia, Russia, Eastern Europe, China, Japan, South Korea, Hong Kong, India, Taiwan, Thailand and Vietnam in a multimillion-dollar deal. In September 2021, it was confirmed MGM would be producing and distributing the film, with Molly Shannon joining the cast, and Braff and Pugh set to produce.

In July 2021, when asked if he would go back to directing feature films, Braff said "I'd like to do more. I just kind of, for better, for worse, I just go where the wind takes me ... and then the pandemic happened and I wrote this screenplay. And then that came together with Florence [Pugh] and Morgan Freeman". Principal photography began in October 2021, with Celeste O'Connor, Zoe Lister-Jones, and Chinaza Uche joining the cast. In November 2021, filming took place at Columbia High School, Braff's alma mater, in Maplewood, New Jersey.

== Release ==
It was released on limited release on March 24, 2023, with wide expansion from March 31, 2023. The film had its red carpet premiere at the Ham Yard Hotel in London on March 8, 2023. The film was released on Blu-ray on May 30.

== Reception ==
=== Box office ===
A Good Person made $2.2 million in the United States and Canada, and $890,791 around the rest of the world, grossing a worldwide total of $3.1 million.

In limited release, the film grossed $832,007 at the box office from 530 theatres, finishing in 12th place. The film had a wide expansion on March 31 alongside Dungeons & Dragons: Honor Among Thieves, A Thousand and One and His Only Son, and grossed $510,210 at the box office, expanding 687 theatres and finishing 14th place beaten up by Champions (2023) (in a record of $700,000).

=== Critical response ===
On the review aggregator website Rotten Tomatoes, 57% of 120 critics' reviews are positive, with an average rating of 5.9/10. The website's consensus reads: "Busy, baggy, and schmaltzy, A Good Person proves that the best of intentions and terrific performances can sometimes add up to a movie that's merely fine." Metacritic, which uses a weighted average, assigned the film a score of 50 out of 100, based on 32 critics, indicating "mixed or average" reviews.

=== Recognition ===
Cary Brothers and Scott Effman received a nomination for Best Original Song in an Independent Film at the 14th Hollywood Music in Media Awards. Chinaza Uche was nominated for a BAFTA Scotland Award for Best Actor in a Film.
