= How to Rob (film) =

- Directed by: Peter Horgan
- Written by: Peter Horgan
- Produced by: Peter Horgan; Chinaza Uche; Josh Koopman; Samantha Brindisi; Vera Teixeira; Becca E. Davis; Rio Contrada; Sara Franzman; Andrew Gerzon; Caitlin Zoz
- Starring: Chinaza Uche
- Distributed by: Cranked Up Films
- Release date: January 20, 2023
- Running time: 93 minutes
- Country: United States
- Language: English

How to Rob is a 2023 American crime film written and directed by Peter Horgan and starring Chinaza Uche. It is Horgan's feature directorial debut.

== Cast ==
- Joshua Koopman as Jimmy Winters
- Chinaza Uche as Sean Price
- Kevin Nagle as Ralph Judge
- Vera Teixeira as Frankie
- Caitlin Zoz as Tina
- David Pridemore as Phil

== Production ==
The film was shot in Boston and Cape Cod. The film was shot in 12 days.

== Release ==
The film was released on demand on January 20, 2023.

In June 2023, it was announced that Cranked Up Films acquired North American distribution rights to the film.

== Reception ==
The film has a 100% rating on Rotten Tomatoes based on six reviews.

James Verniere of the Boston Herald awarded the film three stars out of four.
