= Chinaza Uche =

British actor

- Born: Edinburgh, Scotland, UK
- Education: New York University Tisch School of the Arts
- Occupation: Actor
- Television: Silo

Chinaza Uche is a Scottish-born actor based in the United States. He is known for his series regular role in the Apple TV series Dickinson and Silo. He was nominated for a Scottish BAFTA for Best Actor in a Film for his performance in the film A Good Person (2023).

== Early life and education ==
Chinaza Uche was born in Edinburgh, Scotland, of Nigerian heritage.

He attended the New York University Tisch School of the Arts.

== Career ==
In 2018 Uche appeared in the lead role of Pius in the film Nigerian Prince, which had its world premiere at the Tribeca Film Festival in April 2018, and closed the Africa International Film Festival in Lagos in November 2018.

Uche has many off-broadway stage credits, including at the Manhattan Theatre Club, New York Theatre Workshop, Classic Stage Company, and the National Black Theatre.

He appeared as a series-regular role as Henry opposite Hailee Steinfeld in the Apple TV+ comedy series Dickinson. He also had roles in television series such as Fear the Walking Dead, Little America, and The Blacklist.

In November 2021 he joined the cast of Apple TV+ thriller series Silo.

He starred in the Zach Braff drama film A Good Person alongside Florence Pugh and Morgan Freeman, released in 2023.

== Awards and nominations ==
Uche was nominated for a Scottish BAFTA for Best Actor in a Film for his performance in the film A Good Person (2023).

== Selected filmography ==
| Year | Title | Role | Notes |
|---|---|---|---|
| 2012 | Blue Bloods | Pete | 1 episode |
| 2013 | Deception | Calvin | 1 episode |
| 2013 | Mother of George | Frank | Film |
| 2013–2014 | Producing Juliet | Aarons | 4 episodes |
| 2015 | Working On It | Eddie | 2 episodes |
| 2018 | Nigerian Prince | Pius | Film |
| 2019–2021 | Dickinson | Henry | 23 episodes |
| 2019 | The Blacklist | Tom Hardekopf | 1 episode |
| 2020 | Little America | Chioke | 1 episode |
| 2021 | Fear the Walking Dead | Derek | 1 episode |
| 2021 | The Devil Below | Shawn | Film |
| 2023 | How to Rob | Sean Price | Film |
| 2023 | A Good Person | Nathan | Film |
| 2023–present | Silo | Paul Billings | Series |
| 2024 | Law & Order | Kenneth Cartwright | 1 episode |
| 2026 | The Terror: Devil in Silver | Coffee | Miniseries |
