= Lullaby (2014 film) =

- Promotional poster
- Directed by: Andrew Levitas
- Written by: Andrew Levitas
- Produced by: Cary Brokaw; Andrea Stone-Brokaw
- Starring: Garrett Hedlund; Richard Jenkins; Jessica Brown Findlay; Anne Archer; Jennifer Hudson; Jessica Barden; Terrence Howard; Amy Adams
- Cinematography: Florian Ballhaus
- Edited by: Julie Monroe
- Music by: Patrick Leonard
- Production companies: Avenue Pictures; Ananta Productions; Metalwork Pictures; Media House Capital; Lullaby New York
- Distributed by: ARC Entertainment
- Release date: June 13, 2014
- Running time: 117 minutes
- Country: United States
- Language: English

Lullaby is a 2014 American drama film written and directed by Andrew Levitas, and starring Garrett Hedlund, Richard Jenkins, Anne Archer, Jessica Brown Findlay, Amy Adams, Jessica Barden, Terrence Howard, and Jennifer Hudson. The movie explores the right-to-die issues of a cancer-stricken Jewish patriarch who has decided to stop taking his medication and turn off his life support machines, and how his decision affects his family members' relationships with him and with each other.

== Cast ==
- Garrett Hedlund as Jonathan
- Richard Jenkins as Robert
- Anne Archer as Rachel
- Jessica Brown Findlay as Karen
- Amy Adams as Emily
- Jessica Barden as Meredith
- Terrence Howard as Dr. Crier
- Jennifer Hudson as Nurse Carrie
- Daniel Sunjata as Officer Ramirez
- Frankie Shaw as Janice
- Darren Le Gallo as Ethan
- Maddie Corman as Beth
- Anne Vyalitsyna as Brooke
- Sterling Jerins as Young Karen
- Robert Bogue as Steven Lavipour
- Zac Ballard as Nicholas

== Production ==
On February 6, 2014, ARC Entertainment announced that they have acquired all the North American distribution rights to the film.

== Reception ==
Rotten Tomatoes, a review aggregator, reports that 29% of 28 surveyed critics gave the film a positive review; the average rating is 5.2/10. Metacritic rated it 35/100 based on 14 reviews.
