= Last Moment of Clarity =

- DVD cover
- Directed by: James Krisel; Colin Krisel
- Written by: James Krisel; Colin Krisel
- Produced by: Stephen Israel; Andrew Levitas; Allan Loeb
- Starring: Samara Weaving; Carly Chaikin; Zach Avery; Brian Cox
- Cinematography: Andrew Wheeler
- Edited by: Arndt-Wulf Peemöller
- Music by: Benjamin Patrick
- Production companies: Metalwork Pictures; Rogue Black
- Distributed by: Lionsgate
- Release date: May 19, 2020
- Running time: 90 minutes
- Country: United States
- Language: English

Last Moment of Clarity is a 2020 American neo-noir thriller film written and directed by James and Colin Krisel, as their directorial debuts. It stars Samara Weaving, Carly Chaikin, Zach Avery, and Brian Cox.

The film was released on May 19, 2020, by Lionsgate.

== Plot ==
Before Sam, gangsters murder his girlfriend Georgia, to whom he had intended to propose. Overwhelmed by grief, he flees and conceals himself in Paris, where he is compelled to endure a desolate existence. His sole source of solace consists of frequent visits to the cinema.

Three years later, his latent hope is rekindled when he recognizes his beloved's likeness on the silver screen, portrayed by a renowned Hollywood actress named Lauren Clerk. Driven by an obsession with his past love and a determination to unravel the truth, Sam returns to Los Angeles, where he once again becomes entangled in the violent machinations of the mafia.

== Cast ==
- Zach Avery as Sam
- Brian Cox as Gilles
- Udo Kier as Ivan
- Samara Weaving as Georgia
- Carly Chaikin as Kat
- Hal Ozsan as Vince
- Pasha D. Lychnikoff as Karl
- Alex Fernandez as Bill Rice
- Karl E. Landler as Pierre
- Robert Wesley Mason as Johnny

== Production ==
In February 2018, it was announced that Samara Weaving, Carly Chaikin, Zach Avery, Brian Cox, Udo Kier, and Hal Ozsan had joined the film casting, with James and Colin Krisel directing from a screenplay they wrote.

Principal photography began in February 2018 in Norfolk, Virginia.

== Reception ==
According to Leslie Felperin's review for The Guardian, "this identity thriller suffers from over-reliance on coincidences and perplexing cameos from Brian Cox and Udo Kier". Reviews in Filmhounds and Firstpost were very critical of the production.
