= Sam & Kate =

2022 film by Darren Le Gallo

- Theatrical release poster
- Directed by: Darren Le Gallo
- Written by: Darren Le Gallo
- Produced by: Ben Shields Catlin; Orian Williams; Ford Corbett; Cindy Bru; Darren Le Gallo
- Starring: Dustin Hoffman; Sissy Spacek; Jake Hoffman; Schuyler Fisk
- Cinematography: Robert Yeoman
- Production company: Bond Group Entertainment
- Distributed by: Vertical Entertainment
- Release date: November 11, 2022
- Running time: 110 mins
- Country: United States
- Language: English

Sam & Kate is a 2022 American comedy film written and directed by Darren Le Gallo, and starring Dustin Hoffman, Sissy Spacek, Jake Hoffman and Schuyler Fisk. It is Le Gallo's feature-film directorial debut, and his wife, Amy Adams, served as an executive producer. Hoffman's real son and Spacek's real daughter play these roles in the film.

== Plot ==
Sam, a regular worker at a chocolate factory, meets Kate, who owns a bookstore. He is intrigued; however, she rebuffs his advances by insisting that she is not dating.

Sam is a gifted artist who returned home to take care of Bill, his father. Kate is close with her mother, Tina, who lives on her own and suffers from Diogenes syndrome (in Kate's words, "She is a hoarder").

Kate is upset upon looking at pictures that her mother has found and given her for Christmas, and leaves the room to compose herself. Bill has health problems, and smokes, drinks and eats red meat, against the advice of his doctor. Kate accepts a cup of coffee with Sam, which they both enjoy, and, after a few get-togethers that involve family and friends, they kiss and spend the night together after skating on New Year's Eve.

Bill goes on a date with Tina, after which they return to her house. When he sees the chaos of her hoarding he leaves abruptly, calling the authorities to alert them. Kate is notified, so must again empty her mother's house.

Sam and others help. In the house, Sam finds pictures of Kate with a baby boy and another man, which upsets him as he had no idea about them. He mistakenly gives away a box of items that Kate had intended to keep, chiefly mementos of her son.

Kate confesses to Sam that her family had died in a car accident. The subsequent awkwardness keeps them apart, although he is able to return one toy to her that had belonged to her son.

Sam finally feels inspired to make positive changes. He quits the factory, starts painting, and opens a café which has a corner for live music and he puts his art on the walls.

One day, Sam comes home to find his father dead in front of the TV. Both Kate and Tina come to pay their respects at the funeral.

After a few days, Sam goes to Kate's house to tell her that he has learned so much from his father after going through his things; knowledge that he feels he should have had when he was alive. Sam confesses that he would hate for Kate not to know how much she means to him; they fall into a warm embrace and kiss.

Kate plays a song for Sam on the piano that she composed about how he gave her life.

== Cast ==
- Dustin Hoffman as Bill
- Sissy Spacek as Tina
- Jake Hoffman as Sam
- Schuyler Fisk as Kate
- Henry Thomas as Ron
- Elizabeth Becka as Beth

== Production ==
Filming began in Thomasville, Georgia, in February 2022. In April 2022, it was announced that filming wrapped.

== Release ==
In September 2022, it was announced that Vertical Entertainment acquired distribution rights to the film in North America and UK/Ireland. It was released November 11, 2022. It premiered at the Austin Film Festival.

== Reception ==
On the review aggregator website Rotten Tomatoes, 73% of 30 critics' reviews are positive. The website's consensus reads: "As a life-affirming ode, Sam & Kate is a timeless tale told in a comforting old-fashioned way." Metacritic, which uses a weighted average, assigned the film a score of 58 out of 100, based on five critics, indicating "mixed or average" reviews.
