= Darren Le Gallo =

American artist and actor

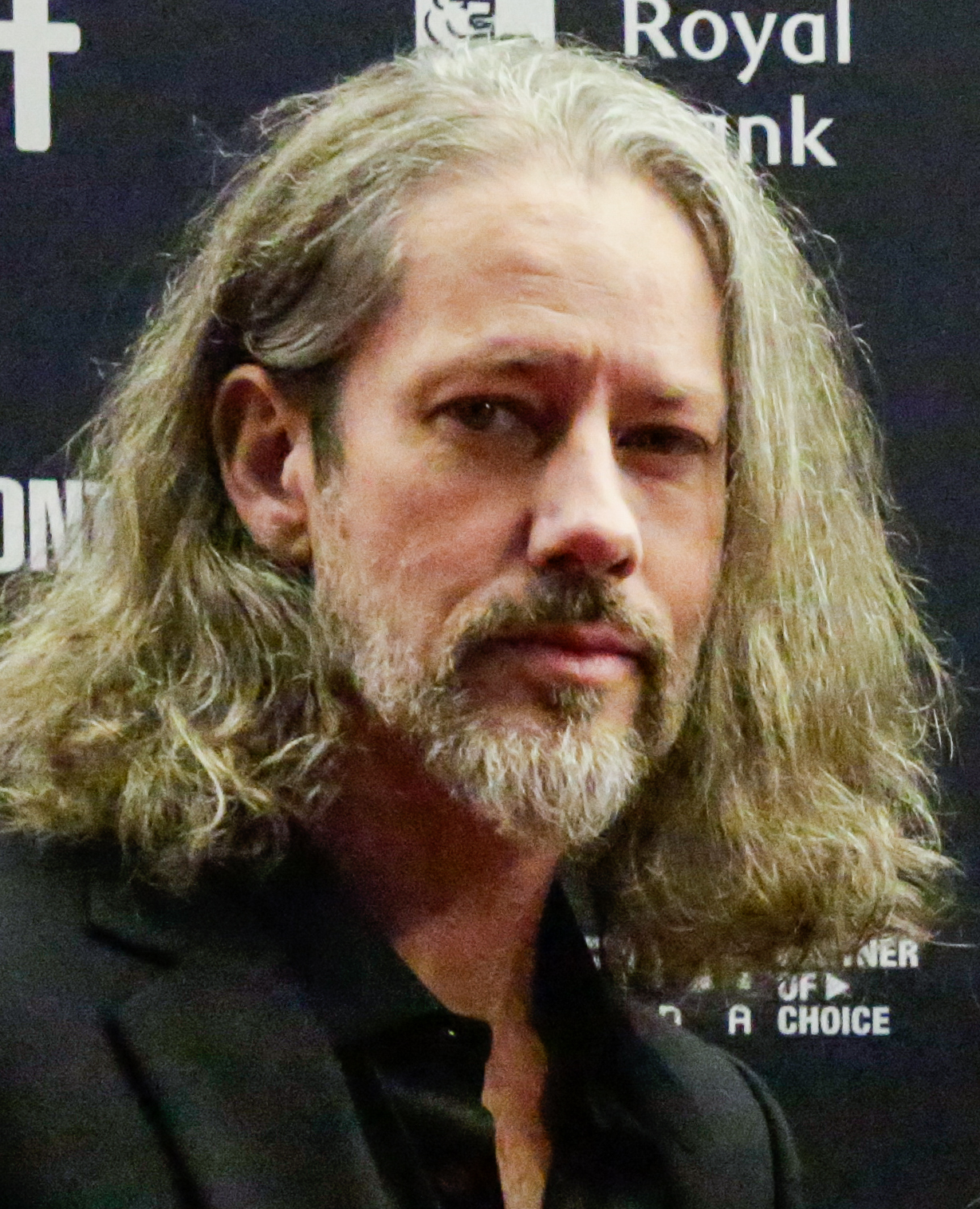
- Le Gallo in 2024
- Born: July 21, 1974 (age 52); Landstuhl, West Germany
- Education: Abilene Christian University (BA)
- Spouse: Amy Adams (m. 2015)
- Children: 1

Darren Le Gallo (born July 21, 1974) is an American actor, filmmaker, and painter.

== Early life and education ==
Le Gallo was born in Landstuhl, West Germany, while his father was serving in the United States Air Force. At the age of four, Le Gallo's family moved to San Antonio, Texas, where he graduated from Tom C. Clark High School. He earned a Bachelor of Arts degree in painting from Abilene Christian University in 1996.

== Career ==
Le Gallo exhibited his artwork at the Trigg Ison Fine Art gallery in Los Angeles in 2020. He has also exhibited his work in the Bold Hype Gallery in Manhattan, the Bergamot Station Arts Center in Santa Monica, and Ghetto Gloss in Los Angeles.

Among his acting credits include the short film Pennies (2006), the feature film Date Night (2010) and the television series Six Feet Under. He also appeared in episodes of Living in Your Car and Then We Got Help!.

Le Gallo has also appeared in the 2022 film Disenchanted. Other film credits include Broken Kingdom (2012), Trouble with the Curve (2012), The Master (2012), and Lullaby (2014).

Le Gallo directed the 2010 short film It Goes. In 2022, he wrote, directed, and acted in the feature film Sam & Kate starring Dustin Hoffman and Sissy Spacek.

== Personal life ==
Le Gallo met Amy Adams in an acting class in 2001; they got engaged in 2008 and married in 2015. They have a daughter, who was born in 2010.

== Filmography ==
=== Film ===
Year	Title	Role	Notes
2010	Date Night	Teaneck Waiter	
2010	Love & Distrust	Cowboy Jim	
2012	Broken Kingdom	Chris	
2012	The Master	Master's Dinner Guest	Uncredited
2012	Trouble with the Curve	Nurse	
2014	Lullaby	Ethan	
2014	Stuck	Dad	
2015	Cindy's New Boyfriend	Nick	
2022	Sam & Kate	Coffee Patron	Also director and writer
2022	Disenchanted	Painter in Town Square	

=== Television ===
Year	Title	Role	Notes
2001	Six Feet Under	Teenage Boy #1 / School Boy #1	2 episodes
2002	First Monday	Man	Episode: "Showdown"
2010	Living in Your Car	Homeless Man 3	Episode #1.6
2011	Then We Got Help!	Michael	10 episodes
