= Curvature (film) =

- Film poster
- Directed by: Diego Hallivis
- Written by: Brian DeLeeuw
- Produced by: Diego Hallivis; Julio Hallivis
- Starring: Lyndsy Fonseca; Linda Hamilton
- Cinematography: Noah Rosenthal
- Edited by: Joel Griffen
- Music by: Adam Taylor
- Release date: October 8, 2017 (Shriekfest)
- Running time: 90 minutes
- Country: United States
- Language: English

Curvature is a 2017 American science fiction mystery thriller film directed by Diego Hallivis and starring Lyndsy Fonseca and Linda Hamilton.

== Plot ==
After receiving a phone call from herself, a woman must break into a top-secret facility to travel back in time in order to prevent a murder.

== Cast ==
- Lyndsy Fonseca as Helen
- Glenn Morshower as Tomas
- Linda Hamilton as Florence
- Zach Avery as Alex
- Alex Lanipekun as Kraviz
- Noah Bean as Wells

== Reception ==
The film has a 47% rating on Rotten Tomatoes.

Scott Tobias of Variety wrote: "Part metaphysical thriller, part inquiry into scientific ethics and the morality of revenge, the sci-fi indie Curvature wants to get the heart racing and the mind bending simultaneously, but flatlines in both departments." Tobias adds that "the film recalls the budget-conscious likes of Primer and Coherence, which explored similar conceits on limited resources, but this pic hasn't been thought through nearly as deeply or cleverly," that the filmmakers "shoot for a comprehensive entertainment that packs a love story inside an action film inside a puzzle picture, but they stretch themselves perilously thin," and ultimately concludes that "Curvature seems destined to slip through the space-time continuum."

Frank Scheck of The Hollywood Reporter was particularly critical of the film, writing that "Until better headache remedies are invented, there really needs to be a respite from time-travel movies that generally prove far more confusing than fun. Such is the case with this film," and advising any potential viewers that "If the prospect of watching Linda Hamilton in a sci-fi thriller involving a character who travels through time to prevent a murder sounds exciting, my advice is to rent one of the Terminator movies. They are far preferable to Curvature, Diego Hallivis' low-budget effort exploiting a similar idea only with drastically duller results," and that "if you happen to get a phone call from yourself advising you not to see Curvature, by all means heed it."
