= Oleg Ivenko =

Ukrainian ballet dancer and actor

- Born: 1992 or 1993 (age 33–34); Kharkiv, Ukraine
- Education: Kharkov Choreographic School; Belarusian State Choreographic College
- Occupations: Ballet dancer and actor
- Known for: Principal dancer with the tatar state opera

Oleg Ivenko (Ukrainian:Олег Івенко, born 14 august 1991) is a Ukrainian ballet dancer and actor, known for his portrayal of Rudolph Nureyev in the film The White Crow. He is a principal dancer with the Tatar State Opera in Kazan.

== Life and career ==
Born in Kharkiv, Ukraine, Ivenko graduated from the Kharkov Choreographic School in 2006 and from the Belarusian State Choreographic College in 2010.

His role in The White Crow was his film debut.

In 2020, Ivenko was awarded the Leonide Massine Prize in Positano, Italy in the category "Best Dancer of the Year on the International Stage".

He played a supporting role in the 2023 biopic drama Joika about the American ballerina Joy Womack.
