= Nigerian Prince (film) =

2018 film by Faraday Okoro

- Directed by: Faraday Okoro
- Written by: Faraday Okoro; Andrew Long
- Produced by: Oscar Hernandez; Bose Oshin; Faraday Okoro
- Starring: Antonio J Bell; Chinaza Uche
- Cinematography: Sheldon
- Music by: Eric V. Hachikian; Peter Nashel
- Production companies: Tribeca Film Institute; AT&T
- Distributed by: Vertical Entertainment; Netflix
- Release dates: 24 April 2018 (Tribeca); 19 October 2018 (United States)
- Running time: 104 minutes
- Countries: Nigeria; United States
- Languages: English; Igbo

Nigerian Prince is a 2018 Nigerian-American bilingual suspense thriller drama film written and directed by New York based Nigerian-American Faraday Okoro in his feature film directorial debut. The film is based on a stock term referring to a type of advance-fee scam. The film stars newcomers Antonio J. Bell and Chinaza Uche in the main lead roles while Tina Mba, Bimbo Manuel, Ebbe Bassey and Dean Cameron in the supporting roles. The film was made as a part of the inaugural AT&T Presents: Untold Stories program as it entered the competition with the intention of securing financial backing and potential distribution.

== Cast ==
- Antonio J Bell as Eze
- Chinaza Uche as Pius
- Tina Mba as Grace
- Bimbo Manuel as Smart
- Ebbe Bassey as Mercy
- Dean Cameron as Bob
- Crystabel Goddy as Bimbo
- Rita Edward as Agent Nifemi
- Craig Stott as Wallace
- Omar Maskati as Raju
- Russell G. Jones as Kingsley
- Eric Nwanso as Stanley
- Shawn Faqua as Isaac
- Amara Onoh as Ikenna
- Toyin Oshinaike as Baba
- Kelechi Udegbe as Officer Femi
- Gregory Ojefua as Henry

== Plot ==
A stubborn Nigerian-American teenager Eze (Antonio J. Bell) is forced to go to Nigeria by his mother. He then joins his cousin Pius (Chinaza Uche) who runs an online scamming business. He joins the online scamming business to collect the required amount of money in order to return to the US.

== Production ==
The film project was announced by debutant director Faraday Okoro who previously helmed few short films such as Full Windsor and Blitz which were also screened in film festivals. He penned the script along with Andrew Long which was also supported by the executive producer of the film Spike Lee. Lee also guided and mentored Okoro to write the screenplay of the film.

In April 2017, Nigerian Prince was shortlisted as one of the five finalists of the inaugural edition of the AT&T Presents: Untold Stories, a project which was initiated in 2017 by AT&T in collaborative partnership with Tribeca, Tribeca Film Festival and Tribeca Film Institute to financially support the underrepresented film projects of underrated emerging upcoming male and female filmmakers in Hollywood. Okoro was adjudged the winner of the inaugural edition on 20 April 2018 and was granted US$1 million for the production of the film. The film eventually became a winning project of AT&T Presents and it is also the first feature film to have completed with a grant from the Untold Stories.

The film was predominantly shot and set in Lagos, Nigeria and the principal photography of the film was wrapped up within 12 months. Soon after the completion of the film, it was slated for the worldwide premiere at the 2018 Tribeca Film Festival.

== Distribution ==
The US theatrical distribution rights of the film was sold to the Vertical Entertainment. The film was also distributed across AT&T's video platforms such as DirecTV, U-verse and DirecTV Now under a five-year license agreement.

== Release ==
The film was screened at the Tribeca Film Festival in April 2018 and opened to generally positive reviews from critics. It had its theatrical release in US on 19 October 2018. The film was also streamed via Netflix on 14 August 2020 and opened to positive reviews from the audience.
