= Zach Avery =

American actor and fraudster (born 1986)

- Born: Zachary Joseph Horwitz; December 5, 1986 (age 39); Berkeley, California, U.S.
- Occupations: Actor and producer
- Years active: 2009–2021
- Spouse: Mallory Hagedorn (m. 2014; div. 2021)
- Children: 2
- Criminal information
- Status: Incarcerated
- Criminal charge: Securities fraud
- Penalty: 20 years imprisonment

Details
- Imprisoned at: FPC Yankton

Zachary Joseph Horwitz (born December 5, 1986), also known by his stage name Zach Avery, is an American convicted fraudster, and a former actor and film producer. In 2021, he pled guilty to securities fraud for his role in defrauding investors of $227 million through a Ponzi scheme and, as a result, was sentenced to twenty years in prison in 2022.

== Early life ==
Avery was born Zachary Joseph Horwitz in Berkeley, California. Avery grew up in Tampa, Florida, and moved to Fort Wayne, Indiana, where he was raised by his mother and a step-father. In 2005, he graduated from Carroll High School.

Avery attended Indiana University Bloomington, graduating in 2010. Avery claimed to have played intramural football in college, and would later claim that an injury kept him out of the National Football League. During his college years, he met his future wife, Mallory Hagedorn.

== Career ==
After college, Avery and Hagedorn moved to Chicago, where Avery started a Doctoral Program in the Chicago School of Professional Psychology, but dropped out 3 months later. In 2011, while in Chicago, Avery heavily invested his money into his first enterprise, a juice bar called "Fül”. The business closed after just a few months of operation. He supplemented his income by selling Quickbooks software door-to-door.

A year after Fül was established, Avery created a fake email from Howard Schultz (Starbucks’ former CEO) reportedly offering him a lucrative job in Los Angeles as the leader of the "entrepreneur outreach" program for his venture capital firm "Mavron". Avery used the fake job offer as a way to convince his wife to close down "Fül" for good in order to move to Los Angeles. Upon moving to Hollywood, he started pursuing an acting career.

Hollywood publicist Nedda Soltani, who was assigned by the company "Entertainment Fusion Group" to help boost Avery's profile as an actor, stated that Avery's time in Hollywood was a split between acting and a "financial startup situation" where he "invested in emerging brands and companies".

== Fraud ==
=== Investment scheme ===
In 2013, Avery was a co-founder, along with the Hallivis brothers (Julio and Diego Hallivis), of the 1inMM Productions company (“One in a Million”). One of the company's projects of note was a new film fund to produce and finance two to three elevated genre films under $5M per year for global audiences.

In 2015 the company had purported to start to produce, acquire, and distribute content to mainstream audiences. Avery had told investors that he had acquired and distributed dozens of films including titles like the documentary Active Measures, the Italian comedy-drama and Director’s Fortnight selection Lucia's Grace, the Canadian Indigenous-focused zombie film Blood Quantum, and the French drama La Melodie, particularly in Latin America. In 2015, 1inMM's annual report touted that it had acquired and distributed 49 films “without incurring a single loss in the process.”

=== Funds ===
The scheme was promoted as a “safe” investment as it was one which acquired the rights to film titles prior to releasing funds for the film. In total, investors had given him a combined $650 million for the fictitious movie deals with HBO and Netflix. However, the funds were used to repay previous investors (i.e., using the money he took from new investors to repay old ones) and to bankroll his lifestyle. Avery's lifestyle expenses included, interior decorating ($706,000), Mercedes Benz and Audi cars ($605,000), private jet and yacht trips ($345,000), Los Angeles party consultant services ($174,000), Las Vegas casinos and nightclubs ($136,000), credit-card payments to American Express ($6.9 million), and a Beverlywood residence ($5.7 million).

=== Defaults ===
In late 2019, Avery began defaulting on payments due to investors. He blamed the problem on HBO and Netflix, which Avery claimed had refused to pay for movies they had licensed from his company. In reality, neither Avery nor his company had ever done business with HBO or Netflix. Avery had not secured any distribution rights, but forged hundreds of distribution contracts as well as correspondence between himself and both HBO and Netflix in order to allay the scheme's investors' concerns. The Federal Bureau of Investigation had estimated that Avery had defaulted around a total of $227 million in payments anticipated by investors.

=== Conviction ===
Avery was arrested on charges of wire fraud (18 U.S.C. § 1343) on 6 April 2021, in connection with the alleged orchestration of a $690 million Ponzi scheme that began in 2015, defrauding investors of over $227 million based on false claims that investor money would be used to acquire licensing rights to films HBO and Netflix had agreed to distribute abroad. On 4 October 2021, Avery pleaded guilty to one count of securities fraud. On 14 February 2022, Avery was sentenced to 20 years in federal prison and ordered to pay $230 million in restitution. Horwitz was sentenced to FCI Terminal Island where he began to serve his long prison sentence. FCI Terminal Island was closed by the Federal Bureau of Prisons. Inmates at this institution were scheduled to be transferred. Horwitz was transferred and is currently incarcerated at FPC Yankton (A Minimum Security Federal Prison Camp). Horwitz is scheduled to be released to supervised release on March 10, 2037. According to fellow inmates, Horwitz is enrolled in "RDAP", the Bureau Of Prisons Drug And Alcohol Abuse Program. This program, upon successful completion, allow inmates a release credit of up to one year off their sentence.

=== Victims' impact ===
The largest source of investor funds for the scheme were raised by JJMT Capital. JJMT Capital had formed when Avery notified friends and fellow Indiana University graduates of his proposal to acquire licensing rights. The group had sourced investors for Avery's promissory notes, including their family, friends and professional contacts. JJMT's principals were reported as having been duped by Avery, and cooperated with the federal investigators. In total, JJMT alone raised about $216 million, securities filings show, and entered into 500 promissory notes. JJMT alerted federal law enforcement to the scheme when Avery stopped making payments on 160 notes sold through JJMT ($160 million in principal and $59 million in returns).

Adam Ferrari, petroleum engineer, who bought nine of the promissory notes ($250,000) through JJMT with a promise of 25% interest, lost $100,000 and subsequently filed a lawsuit against JJMT.

The scheme had impacted over 250 investors. Some investors were financially ruined in what prosecutors called a crime of “staggering magnitude”. Avery's prosecutor stated that some of his victims had been those close to him.

"He began by betraying the trust of his own friends. People who lowered their guard because they could not possibly imagine that someone they had known for years would unflinchingly swindle them and their families out of their life savings."

== Personal life ==
Avery married hair stylist Mallory Hagedorn, whom he had met in college, in 2014. Hagedorn petitioned for divorce the same day her husband was arrested, filing for sole custody of their sons. Hagedorn stated that Avery was “deceiving and manipulating me and everyone around him, and he is not the person that I believed he was.” They have two children.

== Filmography ==
=== Film ===
Avery's screen debut was claimed to be in the 2009 film G.E.D. However, doubt has been cast on the veracity of this claim, with Ivan Parron, a lawyer for Cess Silvera, the director of G.E.D., saying that Silvera had never heard of Avery.

Avery appeared in roles of movies being financed by 1inMM Productions, and being produced by Julio and Diego Hallivis.

Year	Title	Role	Notes
2009	G.E.D.	Thug	Doubt exists
2011	The Duel	Rich Hanger	
2012	Feign	Demon 3	Short film
2013	Nameless	Basketball Player	Short film
2014	Shifter	James Striker	Short film
2014	Fury	SS medic	Uncredited
2016	The Laughing Man	Laughing Man	Short film
2017	Curvature	Alex	
2018	Hell Is Where the Home Is	Joseph	
2018	Farming	Officer Martin Fellows	
2020	You're Not Alone	Mark	
2020	Last Moment of Clarity	Sam Pivnic	
2021	The Devil Below	Jaime Cowan	
2021	The Gateway	Mike	

=== Portrayals ===
Real-life documentaries about Avery include:

Series	Season	Episode	Original Air Date
The Con	2	"The Hollywood Mogul Con"	4 August 2022

Year	Title	Release date
2024	Bad Actor: A Hollywood Ponzi Scheme	6 June 2024
2025	Hollywood Hustler: Glitz, Glam, Scam	17 October 2025
