= Ralph Fiennes =

English actor and director (born 1962)

- Fiennes in 2024
- Born: Ralph Nathaniel Twisleton-Wykeham-Fiennes; 22 December 1962 (age 63); Ipswich, Suffolk, England
- Citizenship: United Kingdom; Serbia
- Education: Royal Academy of Dramatic Art
- Occupations: Actor; producer; director
- Years active: 1985–present
- Spouse: Alex Kingston (m. 1993; div. 1997)
- Partner: Francesca Annis (1995–2006)
- Parents: Mark Fiennes; Jennifer Lash
- Relatives: Twisleton-Wykeham-Fiennes family
- Awards: Full list
- Fiennes's voice from the BBC programme Front Row, 20 November 2011.

Ralph Nathaniel Twisleton-Wykeham-Fiennes (Note: This person has the barrelled surname Twisleton-Wykeham-Fiennes, but is known by the surname Fiennes.) (/ˈreɪf ˈfaɪnz/ rayf FYNEZ; born 22 December 1962) is an English actor and director. Recognised for his work on stage and screen, his accolades include a BAFTA Award and a Tony Award, in addition to nominations for three Academy Awards, seven Golden Globe Awards, and a Primetime Emmy Award.

Born in Ipswich, Fiennes was trained at and graduated from the Royal Academy of Dramatic Art in 1985. A Shakespeare interpreter, he excelled onstage at the Royal National Theatre before having further success at the Royal Shakespeare Company. In 1995, Fiennes made his Broadway debut playing Prince Hamlet in the revival of Hamlet, for which he won the Tony Award for Best Leading Actor in a Play. He was later Tony-nominated for his role as a traveling faith healer in the Brian Friel play Faith Healer (2006).

Fiennes made his film debut playing Heathcliff in Emily Brontë's Wuthering Heights (1992). He has earned Academy Award nominations for his portrayals of Amon Göth in Schindler's List (1993), László Almásy in The English Patient (1996), and a Cardinal in Conclave (2024). He also acted in Quiz Show (1994), The End of the Affair (1999), Maid in Manhattan (2002), The Constant Gardener (2005), In Bruges (2008), The Reader (2008), The Hurt Locker (2009), The Grand Budapest Hotel (2014), A Bigger Splash (2015), Hail, Caesar! (2016) and The Menu (2022).

He gained recognition for playing Lord Voldemort in the Harry Potter film series (2005–2011), M in the James Bond films (2012–2021), Dr. Ian Kelson in 28 Years Later (2025) and 28 Years Later: The Bone Temple (2026), and President Coriolanus Snow in The Hunger Games: Sunrise on the Reaping (2026). He has voiced roles in the animated films The Prince of Egypt (1998), Wallace & Gromit: The Curse of the Were-Rabbit (2005), Kubo and the Two Strings (2016), and The Lego Batman Movie (2017). Fiennes directed and starred in the films Coriolanus (2011) and The Invisible Woman (2013).

== Early life and education ==
Born in Ipswich, England, on 22 December 1962, Fiennes is the eldest child of Mark Fiennes, a farmer and photographer, and Jennifer Lash, a writer. He is a grandson of Maurice Fiennes, great-grandson of Alberic Arthur Twisleton-Wykeham-Fiennes, and great-great-grandson of Frederick Benjamin Twisleton-Wykeham-Fiennes, 16th Baron Saye and Sele, who was born Frederick Benjamin Twisleton. The surname Fiennes is of Norman origin.

Fiennes is the eldest of six children. His siblings are actor Joseph Fiennes; director Martha Fiennes (he played the title role in her film Onegin); composer Magnus Fiennes; filmmaker Sophie Fiennes; and conservationist Jacob Fiennes. His foster brother, Michael Emery, is an archaeologist. His nephew, Hero Fiennes Tiffin, played Tom Riddle (later known as Lord Voldemort) in Harry Potter and the Half-Blood Prince.

Fiennes was raised in the Catholic faith of his mother.

From 1976 to 1981, Fiennes attended Bishop Wordsworth's School in Salisbury. He went on to study painting at Chelsea College of Arts before deciding that acting was his true passion. Fiennes trained at the Royal Academy of Dramatic Art (RADA) in London between 1983 and 1985.

== Career ==
=== 1983–1992: Theatre work and film debut ===
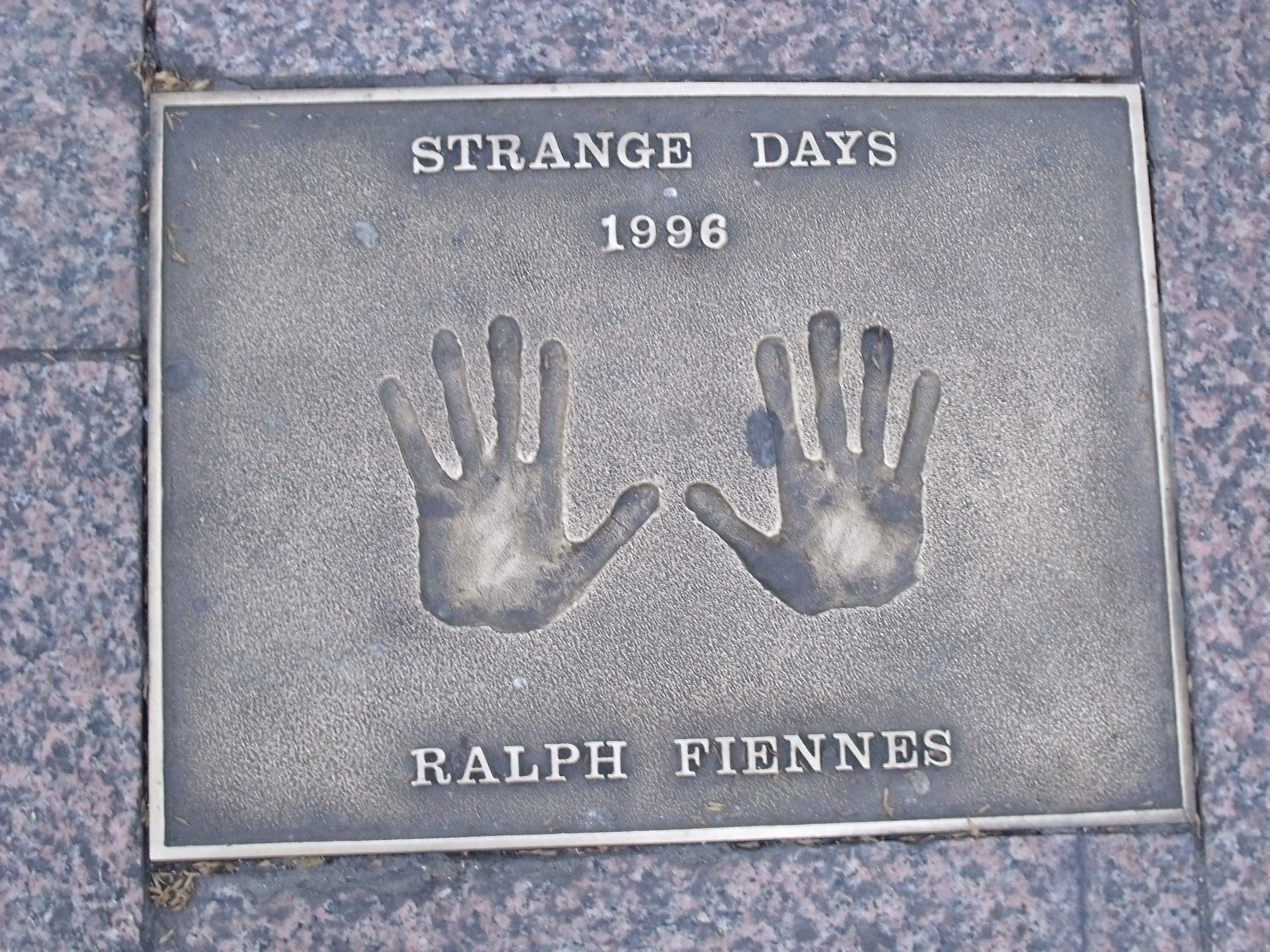
Fiennes's handprints from 1996 at London's Leicester Square, in recognition of the film Strange Days (1995)

Fiennes began his career at the Open Air Theatre, Regent's Park, and also at the National Theatre. He achieved prominence at the Royal Shakespeare Company (RSC). Fiennes first worked on screen in 1990 when he starred as T. E. Lawrence in the British television film A Dangerous Man: Lawrence After Arabia. He made his film debut in 1992 as Heathcliff in Emily Brontë's Wuthering Heights opposite Juliette Binoche. He had a major role in Peter Greenaway's historical drama film The Baby of Mâcon with Julia Ormond, which provoked controversy and was poorly received.

=== 1993–2004: Breakthrough and acclaim ===
In 1993, he portrayed the brutal Nazi concentration camp commandant Amon Göth in Steven Spielberg's historical holocaust drama epic Schindler's List. Todd McCarthy, film critic of Variety praised his performance describing it as "extraordinary" adding that he "creates an indelible character in Goeth. With paunch hanging out and eyes filled with disgust both for his victims and himself, he's like a minor-league Roman emperor gone sour with excess, a man in whom too much power and debauchery have crushed anything that might once have been good." For his performance in the film, he was nominated for the Academy Award for Best Supporting Actor and won the BAFTA Award for Best Supporting Actor. His portrayal of Göth also saw him listed at number 15 on the AFI's list of the top 50 film villains. Fiennes gained weight to portray Göth, but shed it afterwards. Fiennes later stated that playing the role had a profoundly disturbing effect on him.

In 1994, Fiennes portrayed the American academic Charles Van Doren in Robert Redford's historical drama Quiz Show acting opposite John Turturro and Paul Scofield. The film centered around the Twenty-One quiz show scandals of the 1950s. The film received critical acclaim as well as a nomination for the Academy Award for Best Picture. In 1996, he was nominated for the Academy Award, Actor Award, BAFTA Award and Golden Globe Award for Best Actor for playing László Almásy in the epic World War II romantic drama The English Patient, in which he starred with Kristin Scott-Thomas and reunited with Binoche. David Ansen of Newsweek wrote, "once you're hooked, it never loses its grip on your emotions. A great deal of the credit belongs to Fiennes and Scott Thomas, who ignite on screen together." He starred in the romantic drama Oscar and Lucinda (1997) opposite Cate Blanchett, played John Steed in spy comedy The Avengers (1998), and voiced Ramesses II in an animated Biblical epic The Prince of Egypt (1998).

Fiennes's film work has encompassed a variety of genres, including thrillers (Spider, Strange Days), romantic comedy (Maid in Manhattan), and historical drama (Sunshine). In 1999, Fiennes had the title role in Onegin, a film which he also helped produce. His sister Martha Fiennes directed, and brother Magnus composed the score. Fiennes portrayed Francis Dolarhyde in the 2002 film, Red Dragon, a prequel to The Silence of the Lambs and Hannibal. Fiennes's performance as a sympathetic serial killer with a romantic relationship with a blind girl, played by Emily Watson, was praised. Film critic David Sterritt wrote, "Ralph Fiennes is scarily good as [Hannibal Lecter's] fellow lunatic." Fiennes voiced Jesus in The Miracle Maker (2000), a stop-motion animated film depicting the life of Jesus.

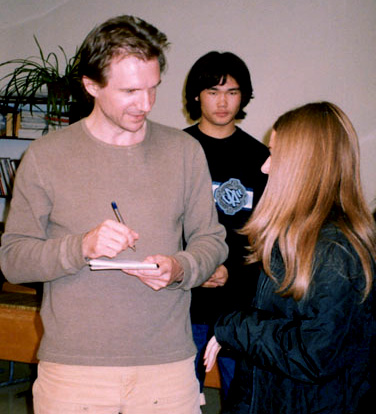
Fiennes gives autographs to fans in Kyrgyzstan, in 2003, during his visit as a UNICEF UK ambassador

=== 2005–2011: Harry Potter and stardom ===
In 2005, Fiennes starred in Fernando Meirelles's The Constant Gardener, a film based on the 2001 novel of the same name by John le Carré acting alongside Rachel Weisz. The film is set in Kenya. It was filmed in part with residents from the slums of Kibera and Loiyangalani. The film received critical acclaim in particular for Fiennes and Weisz's performances. Todd McCarthy of Variety wrote that "Fiennes does some of his finest screen acting" in the film. Fiennes received a BAFTA Award nomination for Best Actor in a Leading Role for his work in the film.

Fiennes voiced Lord Victor Quartermaine in the 2005 stop-motion animated comedy Wallace & Gromit: The Curse of the Were-Rabbit. The role saw him play a cruel upper class bounder who courts Lady Tottington (Helena Bonham Carter) and despises Wallace (Peter Sallis) and his dog Gromit.

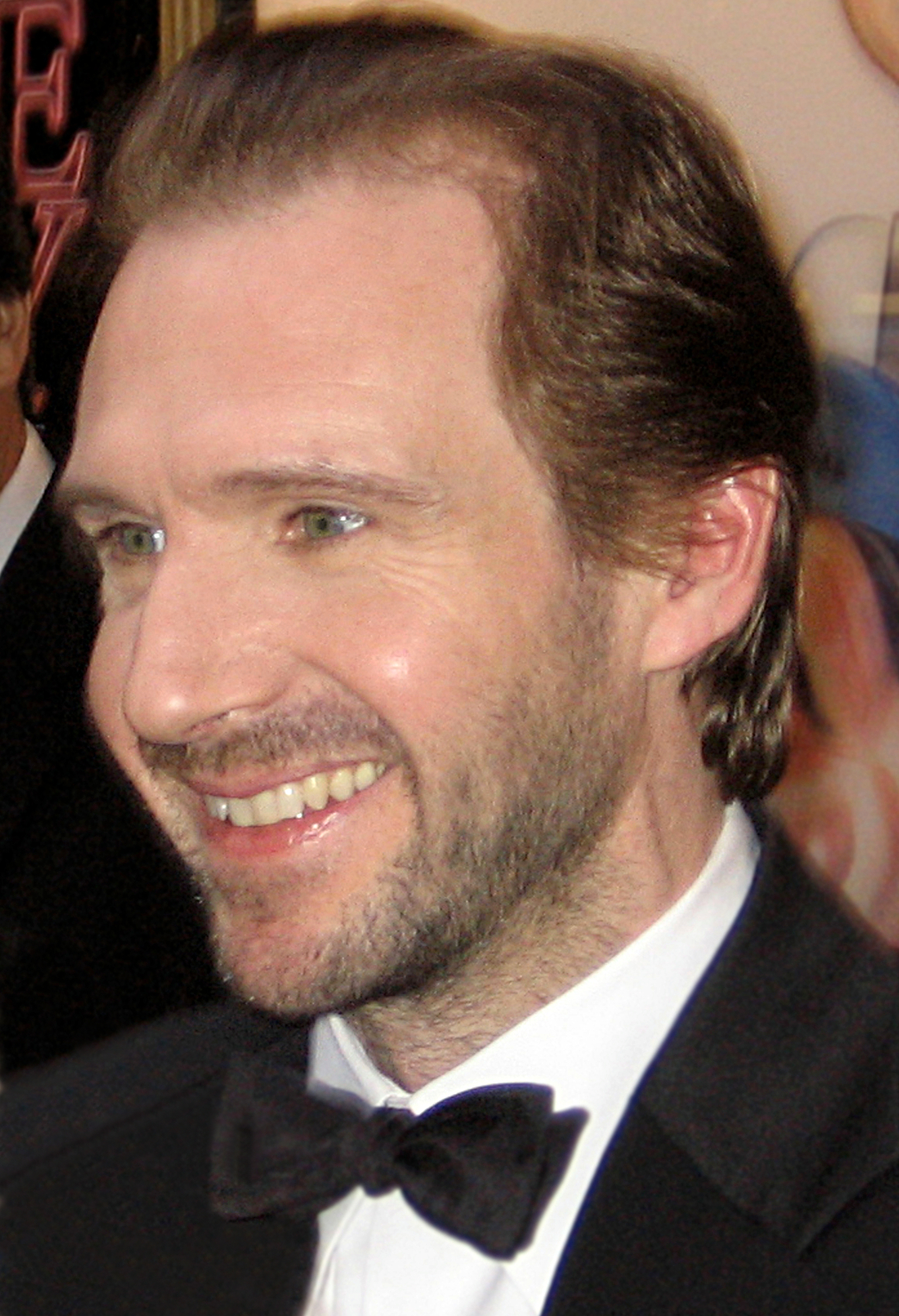
Fiennes in New York City, 2006

Fiennes gained worldwide prominence for his portrayal as Lord Voldemort, the antagonist in the Harry Potter franchise. His first appearance was in the 2005 fantasy film Harry Potter and the Goblet of Fire. He returned to the role for three other films in the series: Harry Potter and the Order of the Phoenix (2007) and both Harry Potter and the Deathly Hallows – Part 1 (2010) and Part 2 (2011). In an interview with Empire magazine, Fiennes said his portrayal of Voldemort was an "instinctive, visceral, physical thing". In a 2024 interview with Collider, Fiennes expanded on playing the character saying, "When I play Voldemort, I'm trying to access something without empathy. It's about power and control and the manipulating of people for power. It's a real, almost erotic pleasure in how I can control you. I know I have the power to do it. You have no chance."

In 2006, Fiennes returned to the stage in Faith Healer alongside Ian McDiarmid. The revival premiered at the Gate Theatre in Dublin before transferring to the Broadway stage at the Booth Theatre. For his performances, Fiennes received a Tony Award nomination for Best Actor in a Play. In 2008, he worked with frequent collaborator director Jonathan Kent, playing the title role in Oedipus the King by Sophocles, at the National Theatre in London.

In 2008, he played the Duke of Devonshire in the film The Duchess opposite Keira Knightley; he also played the protagonist in The Reader, adapted from the novel of the same name alongside Kate Winslet. That same year he also appeared in Martin McDonagh's black comedy crime thriller In Bruges starring Colin Farrell and Brendan Gleeson. In February 2009, Fiennes was the special guest of the Belgrade's Film Festival FEST. He filmed his version of Shakespeare's Coriolanus (in his directorial debut) in the Serbian capital of Belgrade. Fiennes reunited with Kathryn Bigelow for her Iraq War film The Hurt Locker, released in 2009, appearing as an English Private Military Contractor. They had previously worked together on Strange Days (1995). In April 2010, he played Hades in Clash of the Titans, a remake of the 1981 film of the same name.

Fiennes directed and starred in Coriolanus (2011).

=== 2012–2019: Established career ===
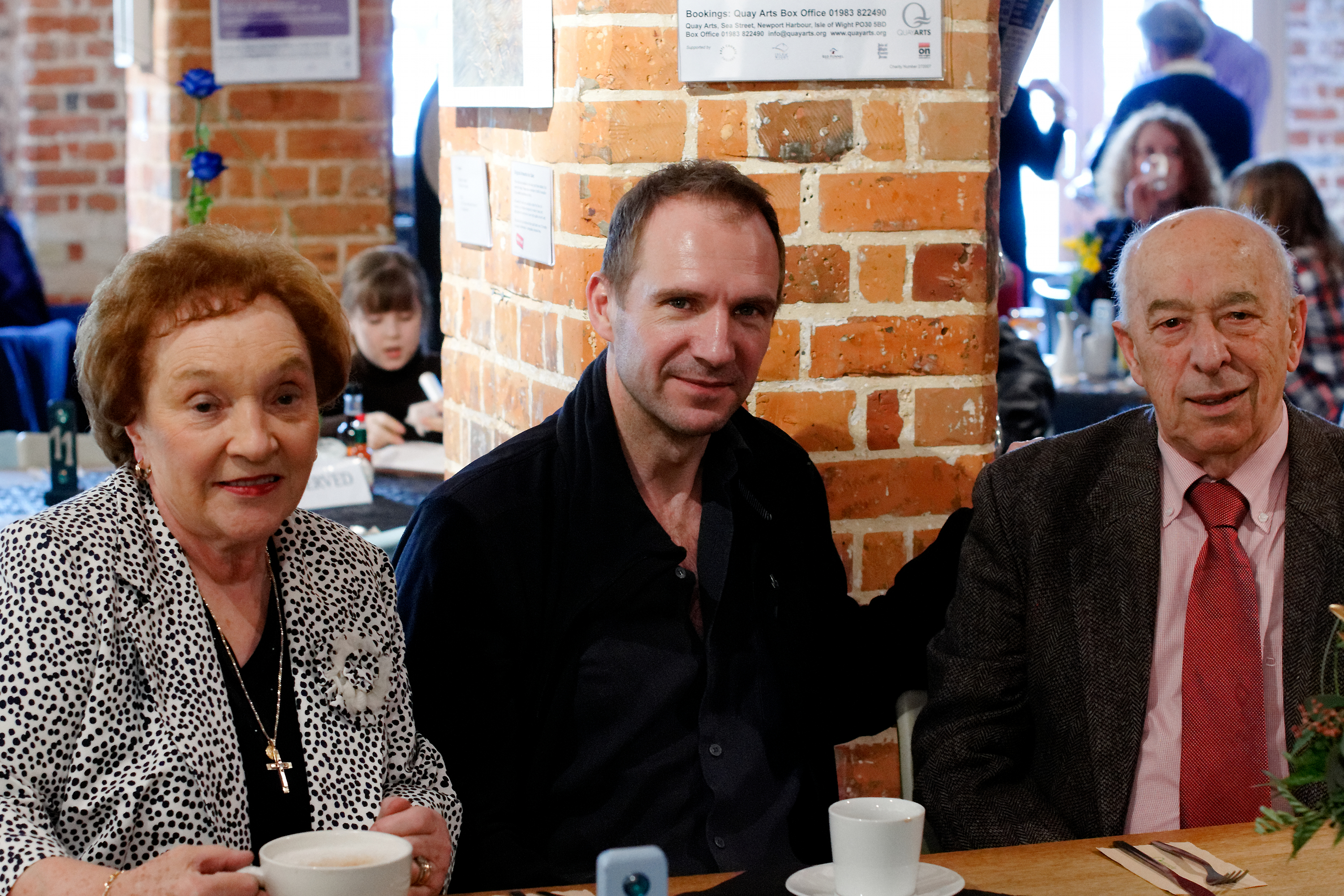
Fiennes with Eddie and Gloria Minghella at the 2011 Minghella Film Festival in England

In 2012, he appeared in the twenty-third James Bond film, Skyfall, directed by Sam Mendes. He replaced Dame Judi Dench as M in subsequent Bond films. That same year, he played Abel Magwitch in Great Expectations (2012), directed by Mike Newell based on the Charles Dickens novel of the same name. He acted alongside Harry Potter alumni Robbie Coltrane and Helena Bonham-Carter. David Rooney of The Hollywood Reporter wrote of his performance that "Fiennes is feral and frightening" adding, "[He] is a touching figure of unexpected integrity and enormous pathos". Also in 2012, he reprised his role of Hades again acting opposite Liam Neeson's Zeus in the action fantasy sequel Wrath of the Titans. Despite the film receiving negative reviews, it was a financial success. In 2013, Fiennes returned to the director's chair helming over the biographical romance drama The Invisible Woman, where he also acted portraying the leading role of Charles Dickens opposite Felicity Jones as Ellen Ternan. The film was well-received with Peter Bradshaw of The Guardian writing, "Fiennes himself portrays a complex figure: a showman, an egotist and an applause-addict whose lovers and children were his enablers, but also a genuine artist and social idealist. This is an engrossing drama, with excellent performances".

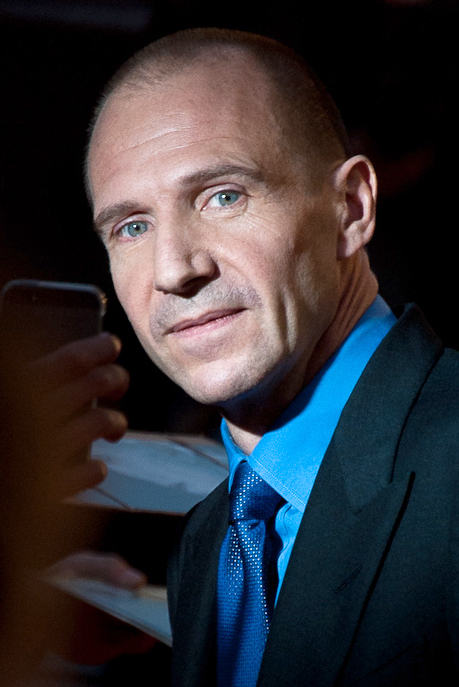
Fiennes at the London Film Festival, October 2013

Though he is not commonly noted as a comic actor, in 2014 Fiennes made an impression with his farcical turn as a flirty and eccentric concierge, Monsieur Gustave in Wes Anderson's comedy-drama The Grand Budapest Hotel. Fiennes used his time as a young porter at London's Brown's Hotel to help construct the character. Film critic Jocelyn Noveck of Boston Magazine stated, "In the end it's Fiennes who makes the biggest impression. His stylised, rapid-fire delivery, dry wit and cheerful profanity keep the film bubbling along." For his performance, Fiennes was nominated for the BAFTA Award for Best Actor in a Leading Role and the Golden Globe Award for Best Actor in a Motion Picture – Musical or Comedy. Film magazine Empire ranked Fiennes's portrayal of Gustave as the 17th Greatest Movie Character of All Time.

In 2015, Fiennes starred in Luca Guadagnino's psychological drama A Bigger Splash alongside Dakota Johnson and Tilda Swinton. In 2016, Fiennes appeared in the Coen brothers ensemble comedy film Hail, Caesar! which is set in 1950s Hollywood. Fiennes plays the fictional Laurence Laurentz, an acclaimed European film director in the movie. That same year, he lent his voice in the stop-motion animated film Kubo and the Two Strings where he played Raiden the Moon King, Kubo's grandfather. In 2017, he voiced the British butler Alfred Pennyworth in The Lego Batman Movie and reprised the role in The Lego Movie 2: The Second Part (2019). In 2018, he directed and starred in The White Crow, a biographical drama film about the Russian ballet dancer Rudolf Nureyev. Fiennes speaks some Russian, which enabled him to play Alexander Pushkin in the film. He received the Special Achievement Award for Outstanding Artistic Contribution at the Tokyo International Film Festival for directing the film The White Crow. In 2019, Fiennes played the MI6 agent Norman Darbyshire in Taghi Amirani's feature documentary Coup 53. Darbyshire, who died in 1993, was the co-author of 1953's Operation Ajax, a joint MI6–CIA military coup that overthrew democracy in Iran.

=== 2020–present ===
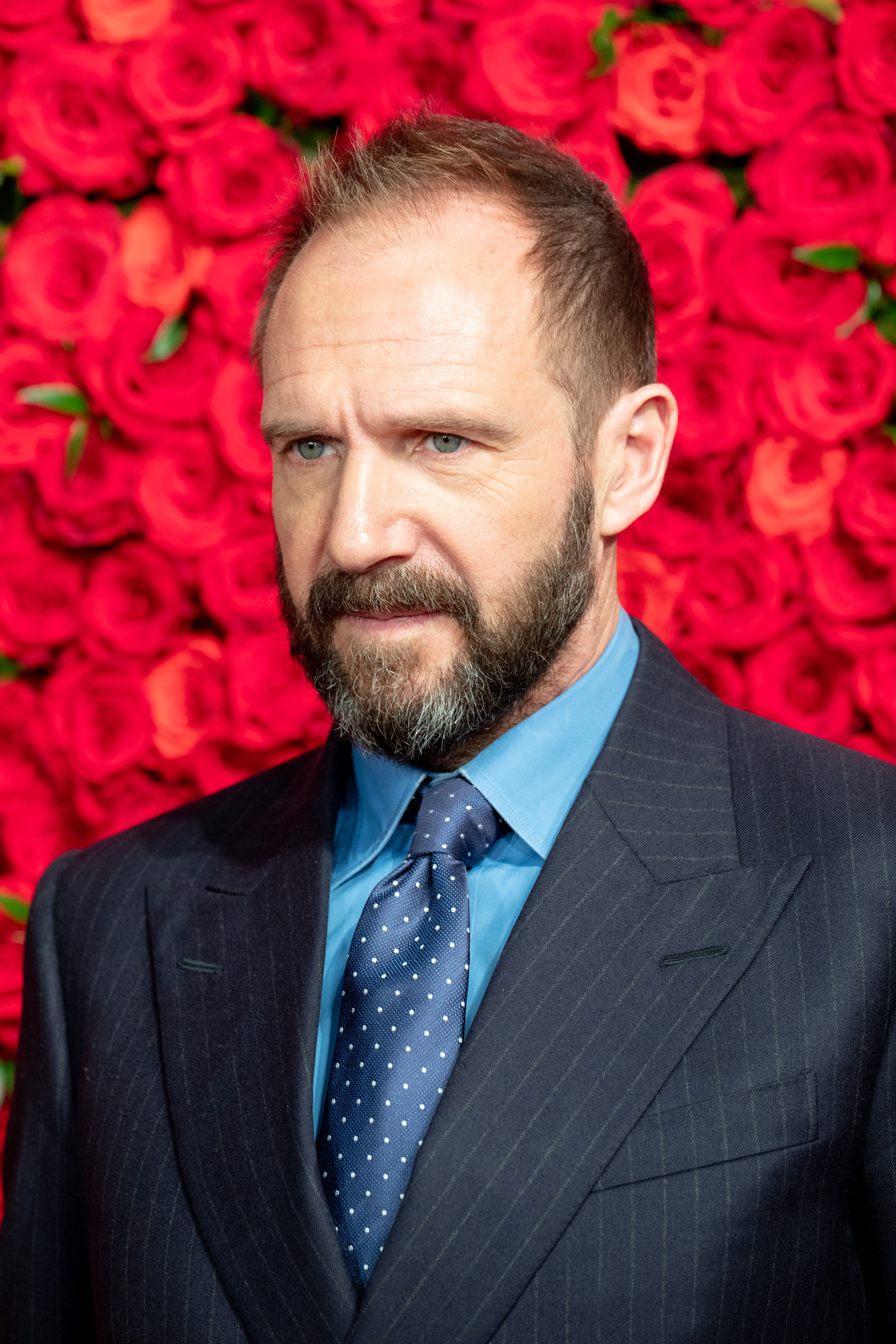
Fiennes at the 2018 Tokyo Film Festival

In 2020, Fiennes voiced a tiger in the family fantasy adventure film Dolittle starring Robert Downey Jr. In the same year, he appeared in the monologue play Beat the Devil by David Hare at the Bridge Theatre in London, and then in the 2021 film version of the play. Also in 2021, he starred in the British drama film The Dig playing the Suffolk archaeologist Basil Brown alongside Carey Mulligan and Lily James. The film received positive reviews with critics praising his performance. The Guardian critic Mark Kermode described Fiennes's portrayal as having an "admirable eloquence". Later in 2021, Fiennes starred in Matthew Vaughn's period spy film The King's Man and Cary Joji Fukunaga's James Bond film No Time to Die.

In 2021, Fiennes returned to the stage in David Hare's latest play Straight Line Crazy at the Bridge Theatre in London. In the play, Fiennes portrays New York's legendary urban planner Robert Moses. His performance has received rave reviews with Variety declaring, "Fiennes is all boldly convincing, controlled threat, his monomania teetering on the edge of malevolence". In The Guardian's five star rave review, critic Mark Lawson described Fiennes's performance as "enthralling" and an "acting triumph".The production made its New York stage debut off-Broadway at The Shed, running from October to December 2022. In 2022, Fiennes starred as chef Julian Slowik in the Mark Mylod-directed comedy horror The Menu. For his performance he received a nomination for the Golden Globe Award for Best Actor in a Motion Picture – Musical or Comedy. Also in 2022 Fiennes collaborated with his sister, the filmmaker Sophie Fiennes, translating to the screen his production and performance of T. S. Eliot's poem, Four Quartets. The original on-stage performance was described as "a magnificent theatrical experience" and "a poignant one-man show about a world under threat." In Sophie Fiennes's film "the lens and the screen bring a new, even more intimate, perspective".

In 2023, Fiennes reunited with the director Wes Anderson in an anthology of short films adapted from the works of British author, Roald Dahl, The Wonderful Story of Henry Sugar and Three More (2023). The series, which sees Fiennes play Dahl in the eponymous first short, also featured performances from Benedict Cumberbatch, Dev Patel, and Ben Kingsley with the eponymous short going on to win the Academy Award for Best Live Action Short Film at the 96th Academy Awards. Fiennes starred on stage as Macbeth in late 2023 as part of Simon Godwin's touring production in the UK. The play, which also starred Indira Varma as Lady Macbeth, was a success, beginning at Liverpool's The Depot in November, before moving on to Edinburgh, London, and Washington, DC. In 2024, Fiennes starred in the Edward Berger film Conclave, for which he received an Academy Award, Actor Award, BAFTA Award and Golden Globe Award nominations for Best Actor. Released in the same year, he played Odysseus in Uberto Pasolini's The Return. In 2025, Fiennes starred in Danny Boyle's 28 Years Later, the third film in the series which is set in a post-apocalyptic Britain 28 years after 28 Days Later (2002).

Fiennes returned to the stage in June 2025, starring as the Victorian star Sir Henry Irving opposite Miranda Raison as the actress Ellen Terry, in David Hare's play Grace Pervades, which explores the working and romantic relationship of Irving and Terry, with the play transferring to the West End in April 2026. His first foray in opera direction took place at the Opéra de Paris in January 2026 with a new production of Eugene Onegin, where one critic noted that he "warned that he would approach the work as theatre. It is hard to say what deserves more admiration: the crowd scenes crafted as living genre paintings or the taut dramatic threads between the protagonists, where singing becomes just one expressive element among others".

In 2026, Fiennes starred in The Hunger Games: Sunrise on the Reaping, the sixth film in the Hunger Games series, as President Coriolanus Snow, previously portrayed by Donald Sutherland and Tom Blyth.

== Personal life ==
Fiennes met English actress Alex Kingston while they were both students at the Royal Academy of Dramatic Art. After dating for ten years, they married in 1993 and divorced in 1997 following his affair with Francesca Annis. Annis and Fiennes separated on 7 February 2006 after 11 years together. The parting was described as "acrimonious"; it followed rumours that Fiennes had an affair with the Romanian singer Cornelia Crișan.

In 2007, Fiennes was embroiled in scandal after having sex with a Qantas flight attendant on a flight from Sydney to Mumbai. After initial denials, it was established that the pair had had sex in the plane's lavatory. The flight attendant was suspended and later fired.

On 7 September 2017, Fiennes was granted Serbian citizenship by Serbian prime minister Ana Brnabić.

=== Charitable endeavours ===
The cast and crew of The Constant Gardener set up the Constant Gardener Trust to provide basic education for children of certain Kenyan villages. Fiennes is a patron of the charity.

Fiennes is a patron of the Shakespeare Schools Festival, a charity that enables school children across the UK to perform Shakespeare in professional theatres.

Fiennes is an Honorary Associate of London Film School. He has served as a goodwill ambassador for UNICEF. Fiennes is also a member of the Canadian charity Artists Against Racism.

=== Advocacy and political views ===
Fiennes opposed the UK leaving the European Union (Brexit). Following the EU membership referendum in 2016, Fiennes stated, "I'm strongly a remainer. I think that our connection with Europe, faulty as it may be in its current state ... it seems to me that the point of the EU was to take down barriers of interactive trade, culture, between cultures, nations."

In a March 2021 interview with The Daily Telegraph, Fiennes voiced support for J. K. Rowling following backlash against her views on transgender people, arguing: "I can't understand the vitriol directed at her. I can understand the heat of an argument, but I find this age of accusation and the need to condemn irrational. I find the level of hatred that people express about views that differ from theirs, and the violence of language towards others, disturbing."

== See also ==
- List of Academy Award winners and nominees from Great Britain
- List of actors in Royal Shakespeare Company productions
- List of actors with Academy Award nominations
- List of actors with more than one Academy Award nomination in the acting categories
- List of British actors
- List of British film directors
- List of English speaking theatre directors in the 20th and 21st centuries
