= The White Crow =

- Theatrical release poster
- Directed by: Ralph Fiennes
- Screenplay by: David Hare
- Based on: Rudolf Nureyev: The Life by Julie Kavanagh
- Produced by: Carolyn Marks Blackwood; François Ivernel; Andrew Levitas; Gabrielle Tana; Ralph Fiennes
- Starring: Oleg Ivenko; Adèle Exarchopoulos; Chulpan Khamatova; Ralph Fiennes; Aleksey Morozov; Raphaël Personnaz; Olivier Rabourdin; Ravshana Kurkova; Louis Hofmann; Sergei Polunin; Maksimilian Grigoriyev
- Cinematography: Mike Eley
- Edited by: Barney Pilling
- Music by: Ilan Eshkeri
- Production companies: BBC Films; HanWay Films; Metalwork Pictures; Lonely Dragon; Magnolia Mae Films; Montebello Productions; Work in Progress; Globus Films
- Distributed by: StudioCanal (United Kingdom); Rezo Films (France); Discovery Films (Croatia); MCF (Serbia)
- Release date: 31 August 2018 (Telluride)
- Running time: 127 minutes
- Countries: United Kingdom; France; Croatia; Serbia
- Languages: English; Russian; French
- Box office: US$7.3 million

The White Crow is a 2018 biographical drama film written by David Hare and directed by Ralph Fiennes. It chronicles the life and dance career of ballet dancer Rudolf Nureyev, played by Oleg Ivenko.

It is inspired by the book Rudolf Nureyev: The Life by Julie Kavanagh. The title is a reference to his childhood nickname of white crow (with a somewhat similar meaning to "black sheep" in English), because he was unusual.

Principal photography was completed in October 2017. It premiered at the 2018 Telluride Film Festival and the 2018 BFI London Film Festival. It also screened at the Tokyo International Film Festival, Cinemania (Bulgaria) and Febiofest (Czech Republic). Ralph Fiennes received the Special Achievement Award for Outstanding Artistic Contribution at the Tokyo International Film Festival, with the film receiving a Tokyo Grand Prix nomination. The White Crow was released on 22 March 2019 in the UK (StudioCanal) and on 26 April 2019 in the US (Sony Pictures Classics).

== Plot ==
The film shuffles through three time periods: the present (1961) in Paris, his childhood, and the beginning of Nureyev's ballet career six years earlier.

The present day in Paris: Rudi has travelled to Paris as part of the Kirov ballet company. During an arranged meeting, he befriends French dancers he read about in a magazine. During one of his dance performances, he befriends Clara Saint.

== Cast ==
- Oleg Ivenko as Rudolf Nureyev
- Adèle Exarchopoulos as Clara Saint
- Chulpan Khamatova as Xenia Iosifovna Pushkina
- Ralph Fiennes as Alexander Pushkin
- Aleksey Morozov as Strizhevsky
- Anastasiya Meskova as Alla Osipenko
- Dmitriy Karanevskiy as Leonid
- Nadezhda Markina as Bureaucrat
- Kseniya Ryabinkina as Anna Udaltsova
- Raphaël Personnaz as Pierre Lacotte
- Olivier Rabourdin as Alexinsky
- Ravshana Kurkova as Farida Nureyeva
- Louis Hofmann as Teja Kremke
- Sergei Polunin as Yuri Soloviev
- Maksimilian Grigoriyev as Rudolf Nureyev (age 8)
- Zach Avery as Michael Jones
- Yves Heck as Jagaud-Lachaume

== Reception ==
=== Critical response ===
On review aggregator website Rotten Tomatoes reports a positive rating of 67% based on 135 reviews, with an average rating of 6.4/10. The website's critical consensus reads, "The White Crow lacks the nimble grace of its subject, but as a reasonably diverting primer on a pivotal period in the life of a brilliant artist, it just about sticks the landing." Metacritic, which assigns a weighted average rating to reviews, gives the film a score of 54 out of 100, based on 8 critics, indicating "mixed or average reviews".

The New York Times wrote, "The White Crow is a portrait of the artist as a young man, an attempt to show the complex array of factors — biographical, psychological, social, political — that led to the moment when the 23-year-old dancer made a decision that would change the history of ballet: Nureyev became Nureyev by defecting from Russia to the West at Le Bourget airport in France in June 1961 ... Throughout [the film], Fiennes and Hare suggest the extraordinary will and curiosity that drove Nureyev to dance, and to seek out art and culture wherever he could."
