= Emily Brontë's Wuthering Heights =

Wuthering Heights
- Theatrical release poster
- Directed by: Peter Kosminsky
- Written by: Anne Devlin
- Based on: Wuthering Heights; 1847 novel by Emily Brontë
- Produced by: Simon Bosanquet; Mary Selway; Chris Thompson
- Starring: Juliette Binoche; Ralph Fiennes; Janet McTeer
- Cinematography: Mike Southon
- Edited by: Tony Lawson
- Music by: Ryuichi Sakamoto
- Distributed by: Paramount Pictures (through United International Pictures)
- Release date: October 16, 1992
- Running time: 106 minutes
- Country: United Kingdom
- Language: English

Emily Brontë's Wuthering Heights is a 1992 historical film adaptation of Emily Brontë's 1847 novel Wuthering Heights directed by Peter Kosminsky. It marked Ralph Fiennes's film debut.

This particular film is notable for including the oft-omitted second generation story of the children of Cathy, Hindley and Heathcliff.

== Plot ==
Inspired by her visit to the ruins of a once-lavish manor home, Emily Brontë composes a story centered on the passionate love between the moor-loving, wild girl Catherine Earnshaw and the poor equally wild spirit her father takes in to be raised as her brother, Heathcliff. When her father dies, Catherine's biological brother, envious of how Heathcliff was favored over him, abuses Heathcliff relentlessly. Driven off, Heathcliff returns years later to find Catherine married to the wealthy Edgar Linton and her family living in near-poverty, and he uses his new fortune to insert himself back into their lives.

The story tracks Heathcliff's and Catherine's fierce love and Heathcliff's rage, pain, jealousy and vengeance that he pitilessly enacts on the man that gets in the way of his marrying her, Edgar Linton. Heathcliff and Catherine's love is painted in intense Romantic tones in contrast to the superficial artifice and shallow feeling of high society as represented by the Lintons.

== Cast ==
- Ralph Fiennes as Heathcliff
- Juliette Binoche as Catherine Earnshaw and Catherine Linton
- Jeremy Northam as Hindley Earnshaw
- Simon Shepherd as Edgar Linton
- Sophie Ward as Isabella Linton
- Janet McTeer as Nelly Dean
- Jason Riddington as Hareton Earnshaw
- Simon Ward as Mr. Linton
- Jennifer Daniel as Mrs. Linton
- Paul Geoffrey as Mr. Lockwood
- John Woodvine as Thomas Earnshaw
- Janine Wood as Frances Earnshaw
- Jonathan Firth as Linton Heathcliff
- Sinéad O'Connor as Emily Brontë (uncredited)

== Production ==
Paramount Pictures was forced to use the author's name in the title of the film as Samuel Goldwyn Studio (later sold to Metro-Goldwyn-Mayer) owned the rights to the simple title Wuthering Heights due to the copyright on their 1939 film version of the novel.

Paramount only distributed the film domestically with its International theatrical distributor at the time United International Pictures distributing the film in the United Kingdom while independent distributors distributed the film in other countries.

The film stars Ralph Fiennes as the tortured Heathcliff and Juliette Binoche as the free-spirited Catherine Earnshaw, in a precursor to their later, successful collaboration on The English Patient.

The role of Heathcliff opened up doors for Ralph Fiennes to play Amon Goeth in Schindler's List. American director Steven Spielberg said he liked Fiennes for Goeth because of his "dark sexuality."

== Critical response ==
The film received mostly negative reviews from film critics. Rotten Tomatoes gives the film a score of 31% based on 13 critic reviews.

The Independent wrote favorably of the film, and notes the fidelity of the movie to the dark sensuality and cruel side of Emily Brontë's character Heathcliff: "Ralph Fiennes makes a demonic Heathcliff, his startlingly blue eyes the only concession to a matinee audience. This performance reminds us that early reviewers of the book were not wrong, when they wondered at the morbidity of its romanticism."
