= Faith Healer =

1979 play by Brian Friel

Flyer for 1981 Royal Court production

Faith Healer is a play by Brian Friel about the life of the faith healer Francis Hardy as monologued through the shifting memories of Hardy, his wife, Grace, and stage manager, Teddy. It was first produced in 1979.

The play was voted as one of the 100 most significant plays of the 20th century in a poll conducted by Royal National Theatre and has been named by The Independent as one of the "40 best plays of all time".

== Synopsis ==
The play consists of four parts, with a monologue making up each part. The monologues are given, in order, by Hardy himself; his wife, Grace; his manager, Teddy, and finally Hardy again.

The monologues tell the story of Hardy, including an incident in a Welsh village in which he cures ten people. Teddy's monologue reveals that Grace dies by suicide, while Hardy ponders whether his gift is real or not. In Hardy’s second monologue, it is suggested that he is beaten to death for his failure to heal a cripple. He says that he knows he will not be able to heal him and, going to face death, he feels a sense of homecoming. From Teddy’s preceding monologue it is made explicit however, that Hardy is actually killed.

== Production history ==
Faith Healer received its first performance on 23 February 1979 in Boston in a production directed by José Quintero and starring James Mason, Clarissa Kaye, and Donal Donnelly. The production then opened in New York City at the Longacre Theatre on Broadway and closed after twenty performances. The first production in Ireland was at the Abbey Theatre in August 1980, in a production by Joe Dowling starring Donal McCann, Kate Flynn and John Kavanagh. The first London production was at the Royal Court Theatre in March 1981, directed by Christopher Fettes, with Patrick Magee, Helen Mirren and Stephen Lewis.

BBC Radio produced the play with Norman Rodway as Frank, June Tobin as Gracie and Warren Mitchell as Teddy. It was produced by Robert Cooper and broadcast on Radio 3 on 13 March 1980, with a repeat on 18 May 1980.

It was revived in 1983 at the Vineyard Theatre, directed by Dann Florek, with J. T. Walsh, Kathleen Chalfant and Martin Shakar. In the same year, William Needles played the title role at the University of California, Irvine. Also in the cast were Mary Anne McGarry and Keith Fowler. The show was revived under the direction of Robert Cohen for a gala presentation to the UCI Theater Guild.

Joe Dowling returned to the play in 1992 at the Royal Court Theatre, London, his production again starring Donal McCann, joined by Sinéad Cusack and Ron Cook to huge acclaim. The critic Sarah Compton remarked that it was "a version so potent that I can look back on it now in vivid, overwhelming detail". Two years later, the production opened at the Long Wharf Theatre, with McCann and Cook. Cusack was sadly unavailable and Judy Geeson took over. The New York Times called the production "incandescent" and recommended it to "any connoisseur of theater".

It was revived in London in 2001 by the Almeida Theatre, in a production by Jonathan Kent. The cast consisted of Ken Stott, Geraldine James and Ian McDiarmid. McDiarmid won the 2001 Critics' Circle Best Actor Award for this role.

Jonathan Kent revived the play again for the Gate Theatre in Dublin early in 2006, this time with Ralph Fiennes, Ingrid Craigie and Ian McDiarmid. This production opened on Broadway at the Booth Theatre on 4 May 2006, with Cherry Jones as Grace. On Broadway it received four Tony Award nominations and won the Best Featured Actor in a Play, Ian McDiarmid.

The Gate Theatre revived the play again in 2009, presenting the play at the Sydney Festival as part of a trio of works being performed to honour the 80th birthday of Friel. The other works were The Yalta Game and Afterplay. This production played at the Gate Theatre in Dublin in January 2010. In 2009, it was also staged by Eric Hill at the Unicorn Theatre as part of the Berkshire Theatre Festival in Stockbridge, Massachusetts, with Colin Lane, Kiera Naughton and David Atkins to unanimous acclaim.

In October 2009, Joe Dowling directed the play yet again at the Guthrie Theater in Minneapolis, Minnesota. This time Dowling also took on the lead role of Frank Hardy himself.

In February 2011, it was staged at Bristol Old Vic under the direction of associate director Simon Godwin.

In June 2016, the play was revived at the Donmar Warehouse by director Lyndsey Turner, with the cast of Stephen Dillane, Gina McKee and Ron Cook, to exceptional reviews.

On 22 October 2016, the play opened at Belvoir St Theatre in Sydney, Australia. Directed by Judy Davis with the cast of Colin Friels as Frank, Alison Whyte as Grace, and Pip Miller as Teddy. The production was co-presented by Belvoir and the State Theatre Company of South Australia at the Space Theatre in Adelaide in September to October 2018. This time Teddy's role was played by Paul Blackwell, who was posthumously awarded a Helpmann Award for Best Male Actor in a Supporting Role in a Play for his performance.

An Abbey Theatre production, directed by Joe Dowling and designed by John Lee Beatty, and starring Aidan Gillen as Frank Hardy, Niamh Cusack as Grace and Nigel Lindsay as Teddy, had been planned for early 2020 but was postponed due to the COVID-19 pandemic. However, the Old Vic Theatre livestreamed a five-performance production featuring Michael Sheen as Frank Hardy, with David Threlfall and Indira Varma, in September 2020. The Abbey Theatre production was rescheduled for November 2020 and still starring Gillen, Cusack and Lindsay, with Cusack and Lindsay receiving Irish Times Theatre Awards nominations.

In 2023 London Classic Theatre launched a UK tour of the play, directed by Michael Cabot. The production starred Paul Carroll as Frank Hardy, Gina Costigan as Grace, and Jonathan Ashley as Teddy. Select tour venues included New Vic Theatre, Theatr Clwyd, Malvern Theatres, The Lighthouse, Theatre Royal, Cambridge Arts Theatre, Hawk's Well Theatre, Millennium Forum, Middlesbrough Theatre, Lichfield Garrick Theatre, Devonshire Park Theatre, and Connaught Theatre.

In 2024 the play had its premiere in Vienna, Austria, in an Open House Theatre production, starring Alan Burgon as Frank Hardy, Anne Marie Sheridan as Grace and Brian Hatfield as Teddy. It was directed by Owen Lindsay.

A new production at The Lyric Hammersmith in London, directed by Rachel O’Riordan, ran from March–April 2024. Frank was played by Declan Conlon, Grace by Justine Mitchell, and Teddy by Nick Holder.

In January 2025, the play was staged for six performances at the King's Arms in Salford. Former Bolton Octagon Artistic Director, David Thacker directed the play, with Colin Connor playing Frank, Vicky Binns portraying Grace and Rupert Hill as Teddy.

== Awards and nominations ==
=== Original Broadway production ===
| Year | Award | Category | Nominee | Result |
|---|---|---|---|---|
| 1979 | Drama Desk Award | Outstanding Actor in a Play | Donal Donnelly | Nominated |

=== 1991 London revival ===
| Year | Award | Category | Nominee | Result |
|---|---|---|---|---|
| 1992 | Laurence Olivier Award | Best Revival | | Nominated |

=== 2006 Broadway revival ===
| Year | Award | Category | Nominee | Result |
|---|---|---|---|---|
| 2006 | Tony Award | Best Revival of a Play | | Nominated |
| 2006 | Tony Award | Best Actor in a Play | Ralph Fiennes | Nominated |
| 2006 | Tony Award | Best Featured Actor in a Play | Ian McDiarmid | Won |
| 2006 | Tony Award | Best Lighting Design of a Play | Mark Henderson | Nominated |
| 2006 | Drama Desk Award | Outstanding Actress in a Play | Cherry Jones | Nominated |
| 2006 | Theatre World Award | | Ian McDiarmid | Won |

=== 2016 London revival ===
| Year | Award | Category | Nominee | Result |
|---|---|---|---|---|
| 2016 | Critics’ Circle Theatre Award | Best Actor | Stephen Dillane | Won |

== Sources ==
- Friel, Brian, Faith Healer. London, Faber, 1980.
- Billington, Michael, "Faith Healer", review of production at the Almeida Theatre, The Guardian, 30 November 2001.
- Fricker, Karen, "Faith Healer", review of production at the Gate Theatre, The Guardian, 9 February 2006.
- Brantley, Ben, "Ralph Fiennes, Portraying the Gaunt Genius in 'Faith Healer'", The New York Times, 5 May 2006.
