= Nicholas Lash =

English Catholic theologian (1934–2020)

- Born: Nicholas Langrishe Alleyne Lash; 6 April 1934; India
- Died: 11 July 2020 (aged 86); Cambridge, England
- Spouse: Janet Chalmers (m. 1976)
- Children: Dominic Lash
- Parents: Henry Alleyne Lash; Joan Mary Moore

Academic background
- Education: St Mary's College, Oscott
- Influences: Thomas Aquinas; Ludwig Wittgenstein; Cornelius Ernst

Academic work
- Discipline: Theology
- Institutions: St Edmund's College, Cambridge; Clare Hall, Cambridge

Ecclesiastical career
- Religion: Christianity (Roman Catholic)
- Church: Latin Church
- Ordained: 1963
- Laicized: 1975

Nicholas Langrishe Alleyne Lash (6 April 1934 – 11 July 2020) was an English Catholic theologian. Having served in the British Army, he trained for Holy Orders at St Mary's College, Oscott, and worked as a Catholic priest until 1975. He left the priesthood and turned to full-time academia, working as a lecturer and then Norris–Hulse Professor of Divinity (1978–1999) at the University of Cambridge.

== Biography ==
=== Education ===
Lash was educated at Worth Preparatory School (Jan 1945 – July 1947) and Downside School (Sep 1947 – Dec 1950). He studied for the Catholic priesthood at St Mary's College, Oscott, between 1957 and 1963.

=== Career ===
==== Military service ====
Lash served in the Royal Engineers from 1951 to 1957. He was commissioned in the British Army on 10 January 1953 as a second lieutenant, as part of his national service. On 1 October 1954, he was promoted to lieutenant and moved to a short-service commission, allowing him to continue his army career. He was moved to the Regular Army Reserve of Officers on 29 August 1957, thereby ending his military service.

==== Ministry and academia ====
After being ordained, he worked as an assistant priest in Slough. In 1969, he was elected a Fellow of St Edmund's College, Cambridge, the only college of the University of Cambridge whose college chapel is Roman Catholic. From 1971 to 1975, he served as Dean of St Edmund's. In 1975, he left the priesthood and became a lecturer in the Faculty of Divinity of the University of Cambridge.

He was president of the Catholic Theological Association of Great Britain from 1988-1990

From 1978 to 1999, he held the post of Norris-Hulse Professor of Divinity at the University of Cambridge, succeeding Donald MacKinnon and being succeeded by Denys Turner.

== Theology ==
Nicholas Lash was the author of numerous theological books and was a regular contributor to The Tablet. A Roman Catholic and considered a liberal, Lash voiced strong but measured criticism of practices among leading figures in his tradition, arguing for open debate on a variety of topics, including the ordination of women.

He was reportedly one of the few Catholic theologians to have read the whole of Karl Barth's Church Dogmatics and the whole of Karl Rahner's Theological Investigations. One of Lash's strongest intellectual influences seems to have been the recovery of Aquinas's theology, using forms of philosophical argument influenced by Ludwig Wittgenstein, which became influential in the 1970s, associated with Cornelius Ernst and Fergus Kerr. Arguably his most significant piece of writing was also one of his shortest, his reflections on the Apostles' Creed, which includes discussion of the doctrine of the Trinity.

He helped organize the 1973 symposium at Maynooth on Bernard Lonergan's Method in Theology.

== Family ==
Lash was born to Joan Mary Moore, a Roman Catholic of Irish descent, and Brigadier Henry Alleyne Lash, an officer in the British Indian Army. He had an elder brother, Father Ephrem Lash (né Christopher John Alleyne Lash; 3 December 1930 – 15 March 2016), who became an Eastern Orthodox archimandrite and prominent translator of patristic and liturgical texts. Nicholas also had two sisters: the artist and novelist Susannah Lash and the writer Jini Fiennes. The latter had seven children, including actors Ralph and Joseph Fiennes, filmmakers Sophie and Martha Fiennes, conservationist Jacob Fiennes, and musician Magnus Fiennes.

After leaving the priesthood, Lash married Janet in 1976. Together, they had a son, Dominic.

== Works ==
His books include

- His Presence in the World: A Study in Eucharistic Worship and Theology (1968; Wipf and Stock, 2005 ISBN 9781592449606)
- Change in Focus: A Study of Doctrinal Change and Continuity (1973)
- Newman on Development: The Search for an Explanation in History (1975)
- Voices of Authority (1976; Wipf and Stock, 2005 ISBN 9781597520478)
- Theology on Dover Beach (1979)
- A Matter of Hope: A Theologian's Reflections on the Thought of Karl Marx (1981)
- Theology on the Way to Emmaus (1986; Wipf and Stock 2005 ISBN 9781597520485)
- Easter in Ordinary: Reflections on Human Experience and the Knowledge of God, Richard Lectures for 1986, (University of Notre Dame Press, 1988) ISBN 9780268009267
- Believing Three Ways in One God: A Reading of the Apostles' Creed (University of Notre Dame Press, 1992) ISBN 9780268006921
- The Beginning and the End of 'Religion' (1996)
- Holiness, Speech and Silence: Reflections on the Question of God (Routledge, 2004) ISBN 9780754650393
- Theology on Dover Beach (2005) ISBN 9781597520492
- Theology for Pilgrims (Darton Longman and Todd, 2008) ISBN 9780232527322
- Seeing in the Dark: University Sermons

Academic offices
Preceded by Donald M. MacKinnon	Norris–Hulse Professor of Divinity; 1978–1999	Succeeded by Denys Turner
