= Henry Alleyne Lash =

British Indian Army officer (1901–1975)

- Born: 8 April 1901; Calcutta, British Raj (now Kolkata, India)
- Died: 13 May 1975 (aged 74); Hindhead, Surrey, England
- Spouse: Joan Mary Moore (m. 1928)
- Military career
- Branch: British Indian Army
- Service years: 1920–1948
- Rank: Brigadier
- Conflicts: World War II
- Awards: Order of the British Empire

Henry Alleyne Lash OBE (8 April 1901 – 13 May 1975) was an officer in the British Indian Army.

== Life and career ==
Henry Lash was born in Calcutta, India, the son of Irish parents Violet Maud (née Keely) and Reverend Nicholas Alleyne Lash. He was educated at Tonbridge and the Royal Military College, Sandhurst.

He was commissioned as a second lieutenant onto the Unattached List of the Indian Army on 24 December 1920, joining the Indian establishment on 4 March 1921. On 7 March 1921 he was attached for his probationary year to the 3rd battalion Worcester Regiment. He joined the Indian Army and was posted to the 4th Battalion, 39th Royal Garhwal Rifles, on the 7 March 1922. This unit later became the 4th Battalion, 18th Royal Garhwal Rifles, after the 1922 reforms. He was promoted to lieutenant on 24 March 1923.

He saw action in Waziristan during 1923–24 and was mentioned in dispatches. He transferred to the 3rd Battalion, 18th Royal Garhwal Rifles, on 6 April 1925. Between 1 June 1926 and 14 October 1928 he served as an aide-de-camp to the Governor of Madras.

On 30 April 1928, Lash, a Protestant, married Joan Mary Moore, an Irish Catholic, daughter of P. L. Moore, C.I.E., I.C.S. They had four children: novelist and painter Jennifer Lash, Roman Catholic theologian Nicholas Lash, Eastern Orthodox Archimandrite and Greek scholar Christopher (in religion Ephrem), and Devon based artist Susannah Lash. Through his daughter Jennifer, Henry Lash is the grandfather of actor Ralph Fiennes, actor Joseph Fiennes, film maker Martha Fiennes, film maker Sophie Fiennes, composer Magnus Fiennes, and conservationist Jake Fiennes. Through his son Nicholas, he is grandfather to the musician Dominic Lash.

He was promoted to captain on 24 December 1928 and was nominated for the Staff College, Quetta, in 1936, graduating in March 1938. He was promoted to major on 1 August 1938. He held an officiating appointment as a Deputy Assistant Adjutant General in the Adjutant General Branch, Directorate of Organisation from 6 April 1939, being advanced to a temporary Deputy Assistant Adjutant General on 1 September 1939.

He served during the Second World War, and was the commanding officer of the 1st Battalion, 18th Royal Garhwal Rifles, by October 1942.

He was appointed an Officer of the Order of the British Empire on 6 June 1946, for his service in Burma as an acting colonel. He was promoted to lieutenant-colonel on 24 December 1946, and retired with the honorary rank of brigadier on 11 March 1948.
