= Sciapode =

French film production company

- Industry: Film Production
- Founded: 2003
- Founder: Emilie Blézat
- Headquarters: Paris, France

Sciapode is a French film production and distribution company headquartered in Paris. Founded in 2003, the company specializes in producing European feature films, both fictional and documentary, blending different genres and art forms.

== History ==
Emilie Blézat founded Sciapode in 2003 to produce films by "strong and ambitious filmmakers." Her first production, Blush, a 2005 choreographic film directed by Wim Vandekeybus, met with public and critical acclaim. Encouraged by this experience, she produced films such as Michaël R. Roskam's The One Thing To Do (2005), Victoire Terminus, a 2008 documentary directed by Florent de la Tullaye and Renaud Barret (officially selected at the 2008 Berlin Film Festival), and Andrew Kötting's 2009 film, Ivul, which was selected at the Locarno International Film Festivals and at the Busan Film Festival. In 2010, two Sciapode productions premiered at the Cannes International Film Festival: Sophie Fiennes' Over Your Cities Grass Will Grow in the official selection, and David Dusa's Flowers of Evil as part of the ACID selection. Both were subsequently entered in numerous festivals around the world. Sciapode also co-produced Valerianne Poidevin's L'Oiseau Sans Pattes (selected at the Cinéma du Réel Festival, held at the Pompidou Centre, as well as the “Vision Du Réel” Festival in Nyon) and Rain, by Anne Teresa de Keersmaeker, Olivia Rochette and Gerard-Jan Claes.

Along with film work, Sciapode also produces works of performance art, like Wayn Traub's opera, Le Comeback de Jean-Baptiste, orchestrated by Hervé Niquet and DJ crew Birdy Nam Nam, and David Dusa's and Mike Sens' L'Emeute des Emotions for the Temps d'Images Arte Festival.

The company is named after the sciapods of Greek mythology.

== Filmography ==
=== International TV series ===
- 2019: Paradise Institute - tv series in development
- 2019: Warm Blood Cold Snow - tv series in development
- 2019: Violence Within - tv series in development
- 2019: Hasugi: animated tv series in development

=== Feature films ===
- 2019: Get Lucky by David Dusa starring Rhydian Vaughan (Feng XiaoYue) - in development
- 2018: His Master's Voice by György Pálfi
- 2017: Grace Jones: Bloodlight and Bami by Sophie Fiennes
- 2015: Galloping Mind by Wim Vandekeybus (Associate Producer)
- 2014: Szabadesés (Free Fall) by György Pálfi
- 2013: Mary Queen of Scots by Thomas Imbach
- 2010: Over Your Cities Grass Will Grow by Sophie Fiennes
- 2010: Flowers of Evil by David Dusa
- 2009: Ivul by Andrew Kötting
- 2008: Victoire Terminus by Florent de La Tullaye & Renaud Barret
- 2006: Here After by Wim Vandekeybus (Associate Producer)
- 2005: Blush by Wim Vandekeybus

=== Feature Documentaries ===
- 2012: Rain by Olivia Rochette, Gérard-Jan Clues & Anne Teresa De Keersmaeker
- 2012: L'Oiseau sans pattes by Valérianne Poidevin
- 2008: The Moon, The Sea, The Mood by Philipp Mayrhoffer & Christian Kobald
- 2007: La Vie de Château by Frédérique Devillez

=== Short films ===
- 2009: Emeutes des Emotions by David Dusa
- 2009: Wild Beast by David Dusa
- 2009: Rushes Instables by Mike Sens & David Dusa
- 2008: Distances by David Dusa
- 2007: Amin by David Dusa
- 2007: C-Song Variations by Jan Lauwers
- 2006: The One thing to do by Michael R. Roskam

=== Stage Opera ===
- 2006: Le Comeback de Jean-Baptiste by Wayn Traub (Premiere at Theatre de la Ville de Paris, Het Toneelhuis Opera House Antwerpen, Kaaitheater Brussels)

=== Films distributed by Sciapode ===
- 2012: Flowers of Evil by David Dusa
- 2003: Guerra by Pippo Delbono

=== DVD releases ===
- 2006: Anthologie by Wim Vandekeybus - 3 DVD Boxset
- 2005: Maria-Dolorès by Wayn Traub
