= Iris Birtwistle =

Iris Mary Birtwistle
- Born: 29 May 1918; Near Blackburn, Lancashire, England
- Died: 22 June 2006 (aged 88)
- Education: Reimann School
- Occupations: Poet and gallerist

Iris Mary Birtwistle (29 May 1918 – 22 June 2006; also known as Lilla and IM Birtwistle) was an English lyric poet and gallery owner.

== Early life and education ==
Birtwistle was born near Blackburn, Lancashire, on 29 May 1918, the second of eight children of the cotton mill owner James Astley Birtwistle and his wife, Muriel Mary (née Marwood). Her brother, Col. Michael Albert Astley Birtwistle, served as High Sheriff of Lancashire. Her younger sister was the poet and non-fiction writer Angela Kirby. She was a cousin of the race horse trainer Monica Dickinson (née Birtwistle), the mother of Michael Dickinson.

She was educated at the Convent of the Holy Child Jesus, Mayfield, Sussex, and at the Reimann School of Art in London. During the Second World War, she was commissioned as an officer in the Women’s Royal Naval Service (Wrens).

== Career ==
Throughout her life, Birtwistle wrote poetry; it appeared during the 1940s, 1950s and 1960s in a number of well known publications, including Poetry Review, The New English Weekly, The Fortnightly, The Spectator, The Tablet, and The Times Literary Supplement. She was well-regarded by several leading writers of her time, including T. S. Eliot, and Robert Graves. Dame Muriel Spark later acknowledged Birtwistle’s influence on her conversion to Catholicism. Birtwistle was a major supporter of and influence on Spark early in the latter's career, giving her "a typewriter, spiritual advice, large sums of money and bags of silken old clothes"; she proved however, in the words of Spark's biographer Professor Martin Stannard, "another chum Muriel wanted largely obliterated from the record" because of Birtwistle's continued friendship with the writer and poet Derek Stanford, who had sold letters from Spark and earned her hatred. Stannard notes however that more recent research in public and private archives "restores [Birtwistle] to her proper importance in Muriel's life",

In the 1950s Birtwistle adopted three sons and settled in Walberswick, Suffolk, where she opened her first art gallery. Jennifer Lash lived with her there for a period of time, and was introduced to her future husband, Mark Fiennes, by Birtwistle.

In Walberswick, she supported the work of the Royal Academicians Mary Potter, Mary Newcomb, Jeffrey Camp and Philip Sutton. She also encouraged emerging artists and sold early work by David Hockney. In the late 1960s and early 1970s, she operated a small gallery in Aldeburgh.

Although Birtwistle continued to write poetry throughout her life, from the 1960s onwards she devoted increasing attention to her family and her galleries, resulting in a gradual decline in her literary output. Her final poem, composed in 1999, marked the marriage of the singer Nick Cave to the model Susie Bick.

In the 1970s, Birtwistle moved to Burnham Deepdale, Norfolk, where she opened the last of her galleries, Deepdale Exhibitions. Birtwistle operated the gallery- while suffering a progressive loss of sight due to hereditary glaucoma, which rendered her blind for the last 15 years of her life- until her death.

Although a collection of her work had been prepared before her death, When Leaf and Note are Gone was published posthumously by Buff Press in 2008, edited by the poets Anne Stewart and Angela Kirby. The introduction was by Derek Stanford.

Birtwistle remained a devout Roman Catholic all her life and died on 20 June 2006, aged 86.
