= Onegin (1999 film) =

- Theatrical release poster
- Directed by: Martha Fiennes
- Screenplay by: Peter Ettedgui; Michael Ignatieff
- Based on: Eugene Onegin by Alexander Pushkin
- Produced by: Simon Bosanquet; Ileen Maisel; Ralph Fiennes
- Starring: Ralph Fiennes; Liv Tyler; Toby Stephens; Lena Headey; Martin Donovan; Alun Armstrong; Harriet Walter; Irene Worth
- Cinematography: Remi Adefarasin
- Edited by: Jim Clark
- Music by: Magnus Fiennes
- Production companies: Rysher Entertainment; Starz!; CanWest Global Television Network; Seven Arts International
- Distributed by: Samuel Goldwyn Films (United States); Entertainment Film Distributors (United Kingdom)
- Release dates: September 18, 1999 (TIFF); November 18, 1999 (Spanish); July 31, 1999 (US)
- Running time: 106 minutes
- Countries: United States; United Kingdom
- Languages: English; Spanish
- Budget: $14 million
- Box office: $2.4 million

Onegin is a 1999 British-American romantic drama film based on Alexander Pushkin's 1833 novel in verse Eugene Onegin. It was co-produced by British and American companies and shot mostly in the United Kingdom. Onegin is Martha Fiennes' directorial debut and stars her brother Ralph Fiennes in the role of Yevgeny (Eugene) Onegin, Liv Tyler as Tatiana and Toby Stephens as Lensky. Two other Fiennes siblings were involved in the project: Magnus Fiennes wrote the music and Sophie Fiennes appeared in a minor role.

== Plot ==
In early 19th century Russia, a bored St. Petersburg socialite named Onegin inherits his uncle's estate in the country. There, he meets a neighbouring landowner and aspiring poet, Lensky, and a widowed mother and her two daughters. The poet is engaged to the elder daughter Olga. Her sister, Tatiana (Tanya), writes Onegin a passionate love letter but he turns her down because of her youth and inexperience. He instead dances with her sister, which the jealous Lensky interprets as flirtation, and challenges his friend to a duel. The duel is arranged to take place in a secluded place by a local lake, and unknown to the participants, Tatiana secretly witnesses the duel from a safe distance. She observes Lensky taking the first shot and missing, followed by Onegin taking careful aim and disposing of Lensky with a shot to his opponent's head.

Onegin departs from his country estate. Six years later, he returns to St. Petersburg, and encounters Tanya, the woman he spurned, who is now a woman of refinement and married to his cousin Prince Nikitin. Onegin immediately sees Tanya as desirable, and falls in love with her. He begs her forgiveness for his past behaviour. Tanya refuses Onegin, explaining to him that he has missed his chance with her; she will be faithful to her husband. He receives her rejection with despair.

== Cast ==
- Ralph Fiennes as Yevgeny Onegin
- Liv Tyler as Tatyana Larina
- Toby Stephens as Vladimir Lensky
- Lena Headey as Olga Larina
- Martin Donovan as Prince Nikitin
- Alun Armstrong as Zaretsky
- Harriet Walter as Madame Larina
- Irene Worth as Princess Alina
- Jason Watkins as Guillot
- Simon McBurney as Triquet
- Gwenllian Davies as Anisia
- Margery Withers as Nanya
- Geoff McGivern as Andrey Petrovitch

== Reception ==
=== Box office ===
Given a limited theatrical release in one theater on 17 December 1999, eventually peaking with six theatres, Onegin grossed US$0.2 million domestically, against a production budget of $14 million.

=== Critical response ===
On the review aggregator website Rotten Tomatoes, 48% of 27 critics' reviews are positive, with an average rating of 5.8/10. Metacritic, which uses a weighted average, assigned the film a score of 59 out of 100, based on 21 critics, indicating "mixed or average" reviews.

It received praise for its production values and performances, but criticism was leveled at the pacing and writing. Roger Ebert of the Chicago Sun-Times said, "There is a cool, mannered elegance to the picture that I like, but it's dead at its center. There is no feeling that real feelings are at risk here." Peter Bradshaw of The Guardian wrote, "An earnest but worthwhile attempt to render the Russian writer's tragic and romantic verse novel of 1833 for the screen... we are estranged from the distinctively comic savour of the original. But there still remains much that is worthwhile in this high-minded adaptation." On the more positive side though, Derek Elley of Variety said ""Onegin" may not appeal to more cynical viewers unprepared to take the emotional leap of faith the movie demands".

=== Awards ===
Martha Fiennes received the Best Director Award at the Tokyo Film Festival and the London Film Critics Circle's award for Best Newcomer. Onegin was also nominated for Best British Film at the British Academy Film Awards and Liv Tyler received the Golden Aries prize for Best Foreign Actress from the Russian Guild of Film Critics.
