= Dominic Lash =

English double bassist and film theorist

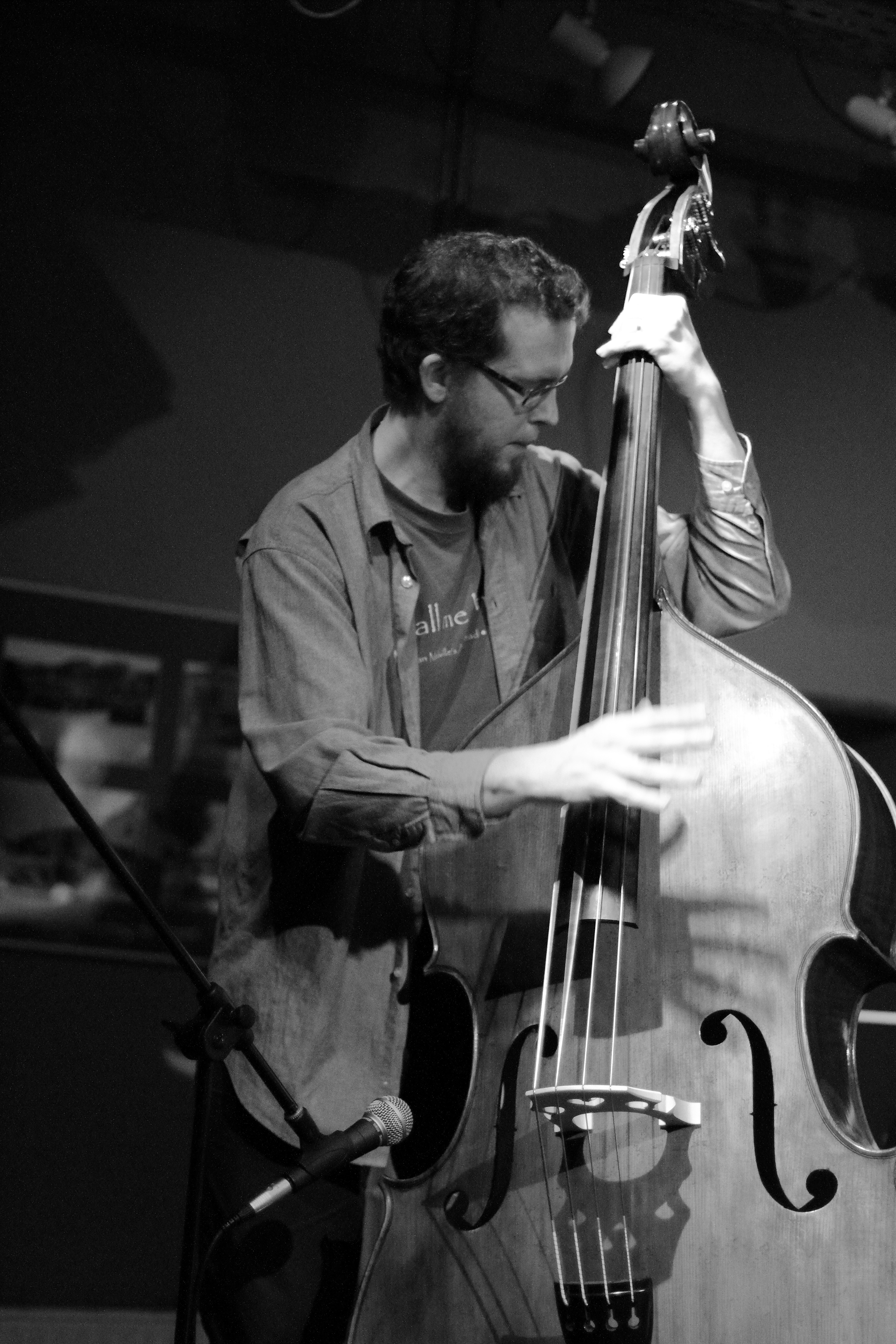
Dominic Lash in concert at Club W71, 2016

Dominic Lash (born 18 January 1980 in Cambridge, England) is a Bristol based double bassist and film theorist. He was formerly a central figure in the musicians' collective Oxford Improvisers. Important long-term musical collaborators include Angharad Davies, Bruno Guastalla, Alexander Hawkins, Tim Hill, Steve Noble, Samantha Rebello, Pat Thomas, Philipp Wachsmann and Alex Ward. He has also performed with saxophonists John Butcher and Evan Parker and violinist Tony Conrad. Recent work includes a UK tour with US guitarist Joe Morris, Australian drummer Tony Buck (of The Necks) and saxophonist Tony Bevan. Festival appearances have included the Manchester Jazz Festival (with the Grew Quartet), Akbank Jazz Festival (Istanbul) and Tampere Jazz Happening.

He is the only child of Nicholas Lash and Janet Lash, and hence first cousin to Ralph Fiennes, Joseph Fiennes and Sophie Fiennes.

As a film theorist he has written the books The Cinema of Disorientation: Inviting Confusions, published by Edinburgh University Press in 2020, and Robert Pippin and Film: Politics, Ethics, and Psychology after Modernism, published by Bloomsbury Publishing in 2022.

== Discography ==
- Grazing - Bruno Guastalla, Dominic Lash (PIE, 2006)
- Live in Oxford - Taylor Ho Bynum, Alexander Hawkins, Dominic Lash, Harris Eisenstadt (FMR, 2007)
- Imaginary Trio - Bruno Guastalla, Dominic Lash, Philipp Wachsmann (Bead, 2007)
- Barkingside – Alex Ward, Alexander Hawkins, Dominic Lash, Paul May (Emanem, 2008)
- Separately and together - London Improvisers Orchestra and Glasgow Improvisers Orchestra (Emanem, 2008)
- Monster Club - Tony Bevan, Chris Corsano, Dominic Lash (Foghorn, 2008)
- No Now Is So - Alexander Hawkins Ensemble (FMR, 2009)
