= The Pervert's Guide to Utopias =

- Directed by: Sophie Fiennes
- Produced by: Katie Holly; Evan Horan; Martin Rosenbaum; Shani Hinton; Sophie Fiennes; Jožko Rutar; Miha Černec; Ineke Kanters; Lisette Kelder; Andrew Grant
- Starring: Slavoj Žižek
- Cinematography: Remko Schnorr
- Edited by: Sophie Fiennes
- Music by: Magnus Fiennes; Horace Fiennes Tummings
- Production companies: Keeper Pictures; P Guide; SPOK Films; The Film Kitchen; Mattima Films; VPRO
- Release date: 7 September 2026 (Venice)
- Running time: 133 minutes
- Countries: Ireland; United Kingdom; Slovenia; Netherlands; Norway
- Language: English

The Pervert's Guide to Utopias is a 2026 documentary film directed by Sophie Fiennes, in which Slovenian philosopher Slavoj Žižek guides viewers through film, music, social media, and archival footage to map the "utopian illusions of our times".

The film had its world premiere out of competition of the 83rd Venice International Film Festival on 7 September 2026.
