= Paul D. Murray =

British theologian

Paul D. Murray is a British theologian. He is currently Professor of Systematic Theology at Durham University's Department of Theology and Religion, and he is the founding Dean-Director of Durham's Centre for Catholic Studies (CCS), the only established academic unit dedicated to Catholic studies located within a British public institution. A prolific author and editor, he was Treasurer of the Society for the Study of Theology (2003–2005), President of the Catholic Theological Association of Great Britain (2012–2014) and he has also worked with the American Academy of Religion, the world's largest scholarly organisation in the field. He was an editor of Concilium International from 2006 to 2011. Since 2011 and 2012 respectively he has collaborated with the Holy See in Anglican-Roman Catholic dialogue and on the Vatican's Justice and Peace committee.

== Early life and education ==
Murray is of Irish descent. He studied at Durham University, where he graduated with a B.A. in Theology in 1986. He then completed an M.Litt with research on the soteriology of Karl Rahner in 1988.

His doctorate at Cambridge (1993–1996) addressed contemporary American pragmatist thought and contemporary theology. This resulted in a number of published papers and, in 2004, the book Reason, Truth and Theology in Pragmatist Perspective.

== Career ==
Murray's current interests focus on ecclesiology, ecclesial practice, and dynamics in ecclesial development. Especially related to these are a number of projects and conferences on 'Receptive Ecumenism' which he initiated and directed. He joined the staff at Durham University in 2002, and became Director of the Centre for Catholic Studies (CCS) in 2008. In 2011 Pope Benedict XVI nominated him to the Anglican-Roman Catholic International Commission (ARCIC). In 2012 the Pope further nominated him to a consultative role in the Pontifical Council for Justice and Peace.

== Books ==
=== As author ===
- Murray, Paul D. (2004). Reason, truth and theology in pragmatist perspective. Leuven, Belgium: Peeters.

=== As editor ===
- Murray, Paul D. (2008). Receptive Ecumenism and the Call to Catholic Learning: Exploring a Way for Contemporary Ecumenism. Oxford: Oxford University Press.
- Flynn, Gabriel & Murray, Paul D. (2012). Ressourcement: A Movement for Renewal in Twentieth Century Catholic Theology. Oxford: OUP.
- Borgman, Erik & Murray, Paul D. (2012). Sacramentalizing Human History: Essays in Honour of Edward Schillebeeckx (1914–2009). Concilium International. SCM Press.
