= Victoire Terminus =

- Directed by: Renaud Barret, Florent de La Tullaye
- Screenplay by: Renaud Barret, Florent de La Tullaye
- Produced by: Sciapode
- Cinematography: Renaud Barret, Florent de La Tullaye
- Edited by: Yannick Coutheron
- Release date: 2008
- Running time: 80 minutes
- Country: France

Victoire Terminus is a French 2008 documentary film about women's boxing in Kinshasa.

== Synopsis ==
During the summer of 2006, in Kinshasa, Martini, Jeannette, Hélène and Rosette spend every day sparring with Coach Judex in the old Tata Rafael stadium, the same one where Muhammad Ali knocked out George Foreman in 1974. At dawn, thousands of people from the ghetto come to train and political parties rally. While others fight for the Presidency of Congo, Judex struggles to organise a woman's boxing tournament with very little money.

== Awards ==
- London Film Festival (2008)
