= Ursula King (academic) =

German theologian

Ursula King (née Brenke; born 22 September 1938) is a German theologian and scholar of religion, who specialises in gender and religion, feminist theology, and Pierre Teilhard de Chardin.

== Academic career ==
King was Professor of Theology and Religious Studies at the University of Bristol from 1989 to 2002, and then President of Catherine of Siena College, University of Roehampton from 2008 to 2015. She had previously been a lecturer at the Coloma College of Education (a teacher training college) and at the University of Leeds. She has held multiple visiting appointments: visiting lecturer at the University of Delhi, Indian Institute of Technology, and the Indian Social Institute; bye-fellow of Newnham College, Cambridge and Gonville and Caius College, Cambridge; and visiting professor at the University of Oslo, Xavier University and the University of Louisville.

== Personal life ==
In 1958 Ursula Brenke passed her Abitur (A-levels) at the Irmgardis-Gymnasium Cologne and in 1963 she married Anthony Douglas King. Together they have four daughters.

King is a Roman Catholic. She signed the Catholic Scholars' Declaration on Authority in the Church, stating "Catholic women need to be able to hold positions within the church authority".

== Selected works ==
- King, Ursula, ed. (1994). Feminist theology from the Third World: a reader. Maryknoll, NY: Orbis Books. ISBN 978-0883449639.
- King, Ursula (2003). Christian mystics: their lives and legacies throughout the ages. London: Routledge. ISBN 978-0415326520.
- King, Ursula; Beattie, Tina, eds. (2005). Gender, religion and diversity: cross-cultural perspectives. London: Continuum. ISBN 978-0826488459.
- King, Ursula (2009). Christ in all things: exploring spirituality with Teilhard de Chardin. Maryknoll, NY: Orbis Books. ISBN 978-0334026839.
- King, Ursula (2011). Teilhard de Chardin and Eastern religions: spirituality and mysticism in an evolutionary world. Paulist Press. ISBN 978-0809147045.
