= Catholic Theological Association of Great Britain =

Religious organisation

The Catholic Theological Association of Great Britain
- Abbreviation: CTAGB
- Formation: 1987
- Type: Professional association
- Legal status: Active
- Purpose: Promotion and study of Catholic theology through teaching, preaching, research, and writing
- Headquarters: Blackfriars Priory, St Giles, Oxford, OX1 3LY, United Kingdom
- Region served: England and Wales, Scotland
- President: Fr. Simon Francis Gaine, O.P.
- Website: ctagb.org.uk

The Catholic Theological Association of Great Britain (CTAGB) is a professional association for those actively involved in the academic promotion and study of theology through their teaching, preaching, and writing.

== Founding ==
Its founding can be traced to the Upholland Theological Consultation, 25—27 April 1984 where Fergus Kerr presented the paper, "The Need for Philosophy in Theology Today" which was published in New Blackfriars.

Its Constitution was first adopted in 1985. The CTAGB was formally registered as a charity on September 11, 1987.

== Membership ==
Presidents have included Tina Beattie, Eamon Duffy, Fergus Kerr, Karen Kilby, Nicholas Lash, Paul D. Murray, Thomas O'Loughlin, Janet Soskice and Edward Yarnold.

The CTAGB members are primarily academic theologians. Members also are those active in chaplaincy, pastoral theology, and fields related to theology, such as history, literature, and philosophy.
