= Angela Kirby =

English writer

- Born: Angela Birtwistle; 4 July 1932 (age 94)
- Occupations: Poet and Non-fiction writer
- Writing career
- Period: 1960–present

Angela Kirby (née Birtwistle; born 4 July 1932) is an English poet and non-fiction writer. Shoestring Press have published five of her poetry collections.

== Background ==
Born 4 July 1932 in rural Lancashire, England, the eighth and last child of a cotton-mill owner James Astley Birtwistle and his wife Muriel Mary (née Marwood). Her eldest sister was the poet and gallery owner, Iris (IM) Birtwistle. A brother, Col. Michael Albert Astley Birtwistle, was a High Sheriff of Lancashire, and she was a cousin of race horse trainer Monica Dickinson (née Birtwistle), the mother of Michael Dickinson. She is the grandmother of Marine Sam Alexander MC killed while on a patrol in 2011 Afghanistan in 2011 by an improvised explosive device (IED).

She was educated by governesses until she was 11, and then at the Convent of the Sacred Heart, Brighton; Rye St Antony, Oxford; and St Mary's Convent, Ascot. She received her MA from Sussex University in 1998 and DPhil in 2006. Married in 1952 to Royal Naval Officer Giles Kirby with five surviving children.

After her divorce in 1975, Kirby worked as a chef, a garden designer, freelance journalist and non-fiction writer on food and gardening. Her first book, Fast Cook was published by Hutchinson in 1982 and other non-fiction books followed until 1998.

With the encouragement of her sister Iris (IM) Birtwistle she began to write poetry as a child and was first published in 1960 but more regularly from 1981. From 1990 she began to concentrate on poetry, becoming published and anthologised, read on BBC TV and Radio 4 and winning the BBC Wildlife Poet of the Year in 1996 and 2001.

== Bibliography ==
=== Poetry collections ===
- 2004: Mr Irresistible (Shoestring)
- 2008: Dirty Work (Shoestring)
- 2013: The Scent of Winter (Shoestring)
- 2015: The Days After Always, New and Selected Poems (Shoestring)
- 2019: Look Left, Look Right (Shoestring)
- 2022: Where the Dead Walk (Shoestring)

=== Non-fiction ===
- 1982: Fast Cook, Good Food for Busy People (Hutchinson)
- 1987: Blooming Ingenious, the impoverished gardener’s guide (Souvenir)
- 1989: Fragrance in the Home (Tigerprint)
- 1997: Gardening in Small Spaces (Pavilion)
- 1998: The Rose Garden, a journal (Friedman Fairfax)

=== Editor ===
- 2008: When Leaf and Note are Gone, Poems of I M Birtwistle (with Anne Stewart) (Buff)
