= Maurice Fiennes =

English industrialist (1907–1994)

Sir Maurice Alberic Twisleton-Wykeham-Fiennes
- Born: March 1, 1907; London, England
- Died: September 14, 1994 (aged 87); London, England
- Education: Repton School
- Occupation: Industrialist
- Known for: Managing Director of Davy & United Engineering; Chairman of Davy-Ashmore
- Notable work: Contributions to British steel industry
- Spouse(s): Sylvia Joan Finlay (m. 1932–1964), Erika Hueller von Huellenried (m. 1967)
- Children: 5, including Mark Fiennes
- Parent(s): Alberic Arthur Twisleton-Wykeham-Fiennes, Gertrude Theodosia Pomeroy Colley
- Relatives: Grandfather of actors Ralph and Joseph Fiennes; great-grandfather of Hero Fiennes Tiffin
- Awards: Knighted in 1965 New Year Honours

Sir Maurice Alberic Twisleton-Wykeham-Fiennes (Note: This British person has the barrelled surname Twisleton-Wykeham-Fiennes, but is known by the surname Fiennes.) (1 March 1907 – 14 September 1994) was an English industrialist.

Fiennes was the son of Alberic Arthur Twisleton-Wykeham-Fiennes, and his wife, Gertrude Theodosia Pomeroy (née Colley), and great-grandson of Frederick Benjamin Twisleton-Wykeham-Fiennes, 16th Baron Saye and Sele. He was educated at the independent Repton School in the village of Repton in Derbyshire and at Armstrong College in Newcastle-upon-Tyne.

He was the managing director of Davy & United Engineering and chairman of Davy-Ashmore in Sheffield, and achieved success as a producer of high quality British steel. He was made a knight in the 1965 New Year Honours in recognition of his contributions to British engineering.

He married Sylvia Joan Finlay, with whom he had five children including photographer Mark Fiennes. He was the grandfather of actors Ralph Fiennes and Joseph Fiennes, and great-grandfather to model and actor Hero Fiennes Tiffin.
