= Janet Soskice =

Canadian-born English Catholic theologian (born 1951)

- Born: May 16, 1951 (age 75); Vancouver, British Columbia, Canada
- Other name: Janet Martin Soskice

Academic background
- Education: Cornell University; University of Sheffield; Somerville College, Oxford

Academic work
- Discipline: Philosophy; theology
- Sub-discipline: Philosophical theology; philosophy of religion
- School or tradition: Roman Catholicism
- Institutions: Duke Divinity School; Jesus College, Cambridge
- Main interests: Relationship between religion and science; religious language; women in Christianity

Janet Martin Soskice (born 16 May 1951) is a Canadian-born English Roman Catholic theologian and philosopher. Soskice completed her Bachelor of Arts at Cornell University and her Master of Arts at Sheffield University. She then obtained her Doctor of Philosophy from Somerville College, Oxford.

She is currently the William K. Warren Distinguished Research Professor of Catholic Theology at Duke Divinity School. She is also professor emerita of philosophical theology and fellow emerita of Jesus College at the University of Cambridge.

Her theological and philosophical work has dealt with the role of women in Christianity, religious language, and the relationship between science and religion.

Her book The Sisters of Sinai details the history of the discovery of the Syriac Sinaiticus by Agnes and Margaret Smith. Soskice has also written that she became religious following a very "dramatic but banal" religious experience.

She was president of the Catholic Theological Association of Great Britain 1992-1994.

== Works ==
=== Books ===
- Soskice, Janet Martin (1985). Metaphor and Religious Language. Oxford: Oxford University Press. ISBN 978-0-19-824727-2.
- ——— (2007). The Kindness of God: Metaphor, Gender, and Religious Language. Oxford: Oxford University Press. ISBN 978-0-19-154433-0.
- ——— (2009). The Sisters of Sinai: How Two Lady Adventurers Discovered the Hidden Gospels. New York: Alfred A. Knopf. ISBN 978-1-4000-4133-6.
- ——— (2023). Naming God: Addressing the Divine in Philosophy, Theology, and Scripture. Cambridge: Cambridge University Press. ISBN 978-1-108-83446-9.

=== Edited by ===
- ———; Ford, David; Quash, Ben, eds. (2005). Fields of Faith: Theology and Religious Studies for the Twenty-First Century. Cambridge, England: Cambridge University Press. ISBN 978-0-511-48840-5.
