= Tina Beattie =

British theologian and broadcaster (born 1955)

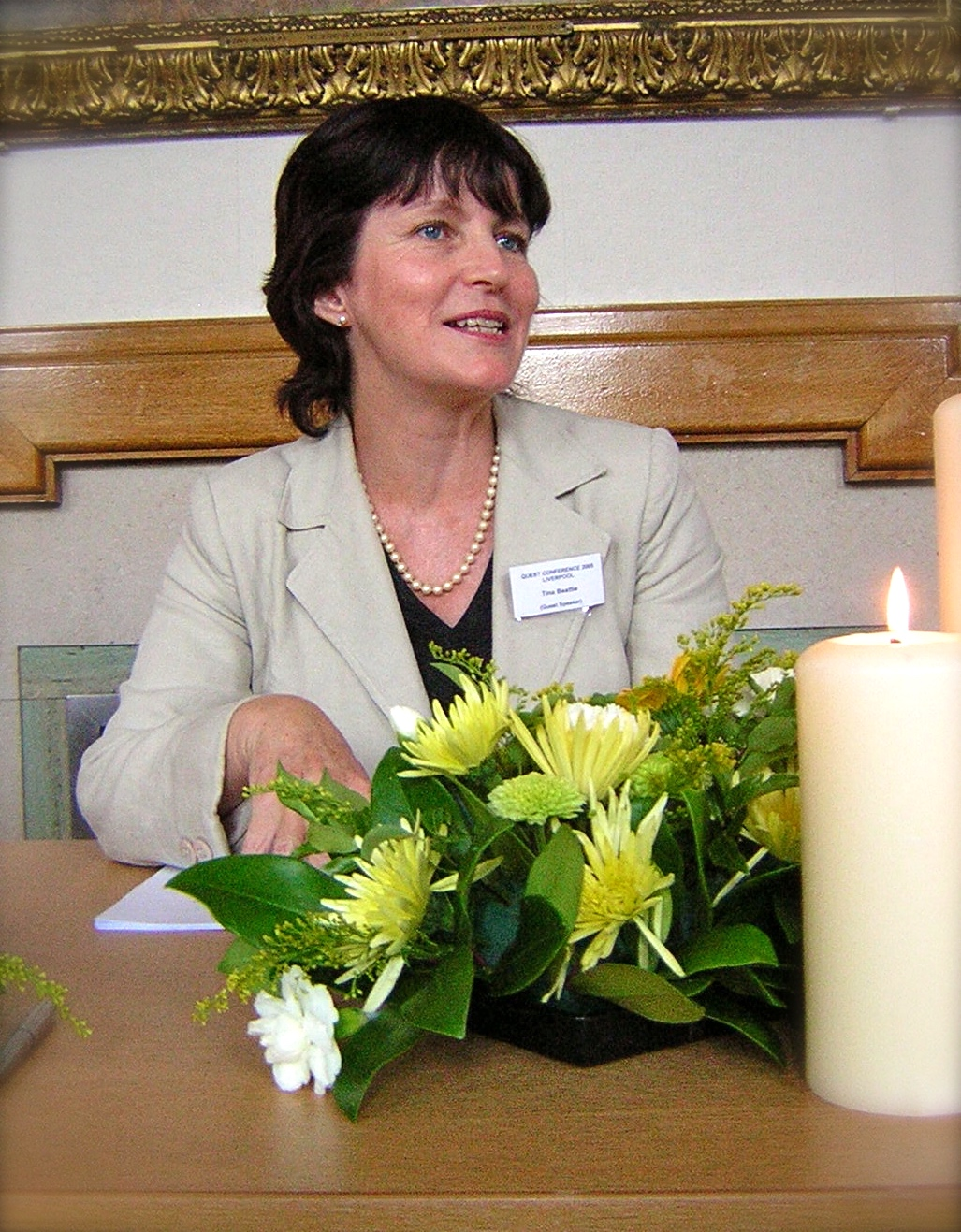
- July 2005
- Born: Christina Jane Bell; 16 March 1955 (age 71); Lusaka, Northern Rhodesia (now Zambia)
- Education: University of Bristol
- Known for: Catholic theology and psychoanalytic theory; gender and sexuality; Marian theology; theology and literature and art; atheism and religion; women's rights
- Spouse: Dave Beattie
- Children: 4
- Scientific career
- Fields: Christian theology
- Workplaces: University of Bristol, Wesley College (Bristol), Open University, University of Roehampton – all UK
- Thesis: God's Mother, Eve's Advocate: a Gynocentric Refiguration of Marian Symbolism in Engagement with Luce Irigaray (1998)
- Doctoral advisor: Ursula King
- Website: https://www.tinabeattie.com

Tina Beattie (born 16 March 1955) is a British Christian theologian, writer and broadcaster.

Until August 2020, she was the Professor of Catholic Studies at the University of Roehampton in London and Director of the Digby Stuart Research Centre for Religion, Society and Human Flourishing at the same university. In retirement, she is remaining Director of Catherine of Siena College at the University of Roehampton and is writing fiction.

Beattie's theological contribution is notable in the areas of Catholic theology and psychoanalytic theory; gender and sexuality; Marian theology; theology and literature and art; atheism and religion; women's rights. She is a long-standing advocate of a more prominent role of women in the Catholic Church.

== Personal life and career ==
Beattie is the eldest of three daughters born to Charlie and Nan Bell. She was born in 1955 in the northern part of the Federation of Rhodesia and Nyasaland, nowadays Zambia, to Scottish Presbyterian parents and lived there for eighteen years, attending the Dominican Convent School in Lusaka. Beattie also lived in Paris, Nairobi and Harare. She is married to Dave Beattie, and worked as a secretary before the birth of their four children (born in 1978, 1980, 1983, and 1986). In 1986, she converted to Roman Catholicism from Presbyterianism.

After moving to Bristol with her family in 1988, she became a mature student at the University of Bristol in 1991, where she received a first class honours degree in theology and religious studies. In 1998, she completed a PhD on the theology and symbolism of the Virgin Mary in the light of the psycholinguistic theory of Luce Irigaray as a resource for the analysis of Christian writings on Mary and Eve in the early Church and in recent Catholic theology.

Beattie lectured at the University of Bristol and Wesley College, Bristol, and also taught for the Open University. She took up a full-time post at the University of Roehampton in 2002. She left her post as Professor of Catholic Studies at the University of Roehampton in August 2020. She continues in her role as Director of Catherine of Siena College, based at the University of Roehampton.

In retirement from active academic research, Beattie has focused on her "first and lifelong passion – to write fiction". Her first novel, The Good Priest, was published in 2019.

== Work and publications ==
Beattie's thesis on the theology and symbolism of the Virgin Mary in the light of the psycholinguistic theory of Luce Irigaray formed the basis of the book, God's Mother, Eve's Advocate (2002), and these ideas are further developed in New Catholic Feminism: Theology and Theory' (2006).

Over the years, she researched and published extensively in the areas of Catholic theology and psychoanalytic theory (Theology After Postmodernity: Divining the Void); theologies and theories of gender and sexuality (New Catholic Feminism: Theology and Theory); the cult of the Virgin Mary (God's Mother, Eve's Advocate); the work of Swiss Catholic theologian Hans Urs von Balthasar from the perspectives of feminist theology and critical theory; Christian mysticism and spirituality; theological perspectives on literature and art; atheism and religion (The New Atheists); Catholic moral theology and social teaching; religion and human and women's rights.

She wrote regularly for the Catholic weekly, The Tablet, and The Guardian newspaper, including an eight-part series on Thomas Aquinas. She also presents the Thought for the Day on BBC Radio 4.

She was a theological advisor to Cafod, the Catholic Agency for Overseas Development; the President of the Catholic Theological Association of Great Britain (2006–08); a Director of the Catholic weekly, The Tablet.

After realisation that the question of women's role in the Catholic Church was not among Pope Francis's priorities, Beattie founded an online community, Catholic Women Speak, in December 2014.

== Controversies ==
=== The University of San Diego withdraws a lecture invitation ===
In October 2012, the University of San Diego cancelled a visiting fellowship for Beattie following the pressure from financial contributors to the university who objected to the theologian's alleged public dissent from the Church's moral teachings. She was scheduled to give a lecture on depiction of sin and redemption in art. The theologian issued a statement rejecting accusations in deviating from the doctrinal truths of the faith as based on serious distortions of her theological position through use of selective quotations out of their context. In the statement, Beattie explained her understanding of her own mission as a theologian and her beliefs:

- Though an academic theologian and a practising Catholic, Beattie acknowledges not being a Catholic theologian "if that implies somebody with a licence who is authorised to teach by the official magisterium". She was aware of and always respected the difference between academic work and a theological work as an educator within the Catholic community.
- Academic theologians must follow "Cardinal Newman's advice of seeking to promote an intellectual culture in which reason rather than fideism is the basis for enquiry and research". In the Catholic tradition, reason and revelation enlighten each other: 'grace perfects nature'. Reason is not the enemy of faith.
- She always and absolutely respected "the difference between the doctrinal truths of the faith, made knowable through revelation alone, and those truths which are arrived at by reason and which involve philosophical reflection informed by natural law and in engagement with other sources of human knowledge". She always defended the mysteries of faith: "they are the grammar of the Catholic faith and knit our community together across the time and space of our historical existence". She only questioned some of the Church's moral and social teachings informed by reason and natural law, "which according to Catholic tradition must be argued in such a way that Catholics are able to enter into dialogue and debate with non-Catholics on questions of shared concern and practice".
- She finds deeply offensive being called pro-abortion by some bloggers. She is pro-life, which in the theologian's understanding means not being able to endorse killing "as good or commendable act, whether it be abortion, war, capital punishment or euthanasia". This does not absolve pro-life Christians from engaging with "the complex and often tragic realities of human life", which means that "a rightful concern to minimise the incidence of abortion must be balanced against the knowledge that nearly 70,000 of the world's poorest women die every year as a result of illegal abortion, and many thousands more suffer serious long-term injury".
- She acknowledges that the question of women's priesthood is of particular complexity, because it is rooted in revelation, and not the natural law tradition. However, since the teaching on women's ordination has never been pronounced infallible, theologians should be free to explore and debate it.

=== Bishops ban Beattie from speaking in their dioceses ===
On two occasions, on instructions from the Vatican's Congregation for the Doctrine of the Faith, British bishops banned Tina Beattie from speaking on Church properties in their dioceses. In 2012, Bishop of Clifton, Declan Lang, canceled a lecture she was to give in Clifton Cathedral. The theologian was told it was because she had been a signatory to a letter in The Times arguing that Catholics could support same-sex marriage in good conscience. In 2014, the Archbishop of St Andrews and Edinburgh, Leo Cushley, ordered to cancel an event at St Catherine's Convent, Edinburgh, where Beattie was due to speak on invitation of the Edinburgh Circle of the Newman Association. In reply to the Archbishop's claim of Beattie being "known to have frequently called into question the Church's teaching", the theologian responded: "Never in my published writings or talks have questioned any of the doctrinal mysteries of the Catholic faith." She claimed the lay Catholics have the right for a "more reasoned and nuanced public dialogue" about same-sex marriage.

=== Cafod defends Beattie's theological advisor role ===
Following signing an open letter to Polish bishops urging support for "early, safe and legal" abortion by Beattie, the Catholic Agency for Overseas Development (CAFOD) came under pressure to withdraw the role of a theological adviser from Beattie. In its statement, CAFOD said that the views in the letter "do not represent nor reflect CAFOD's policies", but refused to meet the demands.

== Writings ==
=== Books ===
- Beattie, Tina (2019). The good priest. Kibworth Beauchamp: Matador. ISBN 9781789016925.
- Beattie, Tina (2013). Theology after postmodernity : divining the void. Oxford University Press. ISBN 9780199566075.
- Beattie, Tina (2007). The new atheists : the twilight of reason and the war on religion. London: Darton, Longman & Todd. ISBN 9780232527124.
- Beattie, Tina; Boss, Sarah, eds. (2007). Marian reader : resources for the study of doctrine and devotion. Tunbridge Wells: Burns & Oates. ISBN 9780860123415.
- Beattie, Tina (2005). New Catholic feminism: theology and theory. London: Routledge. ISBN 9780415301480.
- King, Ursula; Beattie, Tina, eds. (2004). Gender, religion and diversity: cross-cultural perspectives. London: Continuum. ISBN 9780826469342.
- Beattie, Tina (2003). Woman. New Century Theology. London: Continuum. ISBN 9780826457035.
- Beattie, Tina (2002). Eve's pilgrimage. Tunbridge Wells: Burns & Oates. ISBN 9780860123231.
- Beattie, Tina (2002). God's mother, Eve's advocate: a Marian narrative of women's salvation. London: Continuum. ISBN 9780826455635.
- Beattie, Tina (2001). The last supper according to Martha and Mary. Tunbridge Wells: Burns & Oates. ISBN 9780860122906.
- Beattie, Tina (1995). Rediscovering Mary: insights from the Gospels. New York: Triumph. ISBN 9780892438204.

=== Selected journal articles and book chapters ===
- Beattie, Tina (2014). "Whose Rights, Which Rights? – The United Nations, the Vatican, Gender and Sexual and Reproductive Rights" (PDF). Heythrop Journal. Vol. 55, no. 6. pp. 979–1112.
- Beattie, Tina (2014). Littleton, John; Maher, Eamon (eds.). The Revolution of Tenderness – the theology of Pope Francis. Dublin: Columba Press. ISBN 9781782181460.
- 'Mary, Mother of God and Model of a Pilgrim People' in Gavin D'Costa and Emma Harris (eds) The Second Vatican Council (London: Bloomsbury, T & T Clark, 2014)
- 'The Vanishing Absolute and the Deconsecrated God – a theological reflection on revelation, law, and human dignity' in Christopher McCrudden (ed.) Understanding Human Dignity (London and Oxford: British Academy and Oxford University Press, 2013)
- 'The Body Between Us: Towards an Incarnate Mysticism' in Louise Nelstrop and Simon Podmore (eds), Exploring Lost Dimensions in Christian Mysticism: Opening to the Mystical (Farnham, Surrey and Burlington VT: Ashgate Publishing, 2013)
- 'From Ethics to Eschatology: The Continuing Validity of the New Eve for Christian Doctrine and Discipleship' in Rob C. MacSwain et al. (eds) Theology, Aesthetics and Culture (Oxford: Oxford University Press, 2012)
- 'Fragments: Reflections in a Shattered Screen', Political Theology, Vol. 12, No. 5, 2011: pp. 672–77
- 'Catholicism, Choice and Consciousness: A Feminist Theological Perspective on Abortion', International Journal of Public Theology, Vol. 4, No. 1 (2010): pp. 51–75
- 'Earth, Wind and Fire: Fenwick Lawson's Art', Art & Christianity, No. 57, Spring 2009
- 'The End of Woman: Gender, God and Rights Beyond Modernity' in Patrick Claffey and Joseph Egan (eds), Movement or Moment?: Assessing Liberation Theology Forty Years after Medellín (Oxford, Bern, Berlin, Bruxelles, Frankfurt am Main, New York, Wien: Peter Lang, 2009)
- 'Humanae Vitae: nature, sex and reason in conflict', The Pastoral Review, July 2008
- 'From Rosaries to Rights – Towards an Integrated Catholicism' in Bernard Hoose, Julie Clague and Gerard Mannion (eds.) Moral Theology for the Twenty-First Century: Essays in Celebration of Kevin Kelly (London and New York: Continuum, 2008)
- '"Justice enacted not these human laws" (Antigone): Religion, Natural Law and Women's Rights', Religion and Human Rights, Vol. 3, No. 3, 2008: pp. 249–267
- 'Vision and Vulnerability: the significance of sacramentality and the woman priest for feminist theology' in Natalie Watson and Stephen Burns (eds) Exchanges of Grace: Essays in Honour of Ann Loades (London SPCK, 2008)
- 'Mary in Patristic Theology' in Sarah Jane Boss (ed.), Mary: The Complete Resource (London: Continuum, New York: Oxford University Press)
- 'Queen of Heaven' in Gerard Loughlin (ed.), Queer Theology: New Perspectives on Sex and Gender (Oxford: Basil Blackwell, 2007)
- 'Insight beyond Sight: Sacramentality and the Eucharist in the Isenheim Altarpiece', New Blackfriars, Vol. 88.1013, 2007: pp. 67–72
- 'Redeeming Mary: The Potential of Marian Symbolism for Feminist Philosophy of Religion' in Pamela Sue Anderson and Beverley Clack (eds.), Feminist Philosophy of Religion: Critical Readings (London: Routledge, 2003)
- 'Etty Hillesum: A Thinking Heart in a Darkened World' in Ursula King with Tina Beattie (eds), Spirituality and Society in the New Millennium (Sussex: Sussex Academic Press, 2001)
- 'Global Sisterhood or Wicked Stepsisters: Why Aren't Girls with God Mothers Invited to the Ball?' in Deborah Sawyer and Diane Collier (eds.), Is there a Future for Feminist Theology? (Sheffield: Sheffield Academic Press, 1999)
- 'Carnal Love and Spiritual Imagination: Can Luce Irigaray and John Paul II Come Together?' in Jon Davies and Gerard Loughlin (eds.), Sex These Days: Essays on Theology, Sexuality and Society (Sheffield: Sheffield Academic Press, 1997)
- 'Sexuality and the Resurrection of the Body: Reflections in a Hall of Mirrors' in Gavin D'Costa (ed.), Resurrection Reconsidered (Oxford: Oneworld Publications, 1996)

=== Newspaper and magazine articles ===
- 'Sex, Marriage and the Catholic Church', The Guardian, 8 October 2014 – article on being a Catholic and a feminist
- 'Pope Francis has done little to improve women's lives', The Guardian, 27 August 2014 – article on Pope Francis's failure to address issues of maternal mortality and the impact of poverty on women's reproductive lives
- 'Let the Laity Be Heard', The Tablet, 31 July 2014 – article on the International Theological Commission's document, Sensus Fidei in the Life of the Church
- 'Part of the Solution, not Part of the Problem', The Tablet, 8 May 2014 – article on the Holy See, the UN and population and development
- 'Why British outcry at Oklahoma's botched execution rings tragically hollow', The Tablet blog, 6 May 2014 – blog on drugs used in American executions and late abortion
- 'Doorways to Faith – the Role of Mysticism and Sacramentality in Prayer' – reflection published in Independent Catholic News
- 'Towards the Shining City: Rural and Urban in the Easter Story', The Tablet, 7 April 2012 – article on the Holy Sepulchre in Jerusalem
- 'In the Balance', The Tablet, 5 June 2010 – article on the morality of abortion
- 'The Catholic Church's Scandal: Modern Crisis, Ancient Roots', Open Democracy, 14 April 2010 – article on the sex abuse scandal
- 'Antichrist: The Visual Theology of Lars von Trier', Open Democracy, 13 August 2009
- 'Along the precipice: visions of atheism in London', Open Democracy, 6 November 2008 – article on Francis Bacon exhibition
- 'An Immense Maternal Presence', The Tablet, 13 September 2008 – article on Lourdes
- 'The dark (k)night of a postmodern world', Open Democracy, 21 August 2008 – article on The Dark Knight
- 'Simple Gaudete of a Complex Believer', The Tablet, 17 December 2005 – article on Andy Warhol
- 'Feminism, Vatican-style', The Tablet, 7 August 2004 – critique of the Vatican letter on women
- 'Beauty Back on Camera', The Tablet, 26 February 2000 – article on the film American Beauty
