= Cornelius Ernst =

Sri Lankan Dominican theologian (1924–1977)

Cornelius Ernst OP (1924–1977) was a Sri Lankan Dominican theologian.

== Biography ==
Ernst was born in Ceylon (now Sri Lanka) in 1924 to an ethnically Dutch Anglican father and Sinhalese Buddhist mother. For a period, he was a member of the Communist Party of Sri Lanka. He shared the Anglicanism of his father, but later converted to Catholicism after reading John Henry Newman's Apologia Pro Vita Sua.

He was ordained in 1954; following this he taught at Hawkesyard Priory in Staffordshire, England from 1957 until 1966, when he moved to Oxford Priory.

While at Cambridge (1946–7) he attended lectures by Ludwig Wittgenstein, which had a lasting impression on him, leading him to attempt a synthesis of the ideas of Wittgenstein and Aquinas.

Ernst was significantly influenced by Karl Rahner and acknowledged "my profound debt" to him. He produced the first English translation of Rahner's Schriften zur Theologie which he penned the foreword to and named Theological Investigations. This title choice was influenced by Wittgenstein's book Philosophical Investigations. Ernst edited a series of volumes entitled Sacramentum Mundi: an Encyclopedia of Theology alongside Rahner and Kevin Smyth, and also Rahner and Herbert Vorgrimler's Theological Dictionary.

A major focus of Ernst's work was on grace. He edited and wrote the introduction to a Latin-English bilingual translation of the section on grace in Thomas Aquinas' Summa Theologiae, which he published in 1972. In 1974 he published a book, The Theology of Grace.

Ernst was a long time contributor to the New Blackfriars journal.

In 1979, many of his essays were posthumously published as a book, Multiple Echo, featuring a foreword by Donald M. MacKinnon. Ernst's work influenced theologians Nicholas Lash, Fergus Kerr, and Timothy Radcliffe.

== Bibliography ==
- Morals and Language in Blackfriars, Vol. 35, No. 415 (OCTOBER 1954), pp. 414-419.
- The Relevance of Primitive Religion in Blackfriars, Vol. 38, No. 453 (DECEMBER 1957), pp. 524-528.
- Ethics and the Play of Intelligence in Blackfriars, Vol. 39, No. 460-1 (JULY-AUGUST 1958), pp. 324-327.
- Ethics and the Play of Intelligence in Blackfriars, Vol. 39, No. 460-1 (JULY-AUGUST 1958), pp. 324-327.
- Reflections on the Theology of the Blessed Trinity in Life of the Spirit, Vol. 12, No. 141 (MARCH 1958), pp. 388-392
- Truth and Verification in Theology in Blackfriars, Vol. 40, No. 468, HISTORY AND PHILOSOPHY OF SCIENCE (MARCH 1959), pp. 100-111.
- The New Herder in Blackfriars, Vol. 40, No. 470 (MAY 1959), pp. 226-228.
- A Theological Chronicle in Blackfriars, Vol. 41, No. 482 (JUNE 1960), pp. 220-227.
- Faith and Reality: Two Major Works of Biblical Theology in Life of the Spirit, Vol. 16, No. 181 (JULY 1961), pp. 3-10.
- Christianity and Sex: Orientations in Blackfriars, Vol. 42, No. 493 (JUNE 1961), pp. 244-250.
- A Theological Chronicle: Sin in Blackfriars, Vol. 42, No. 498 (DECEMBER 1961), pp. 502-50.
- Theological Survey - The Herder Lexikon: A Report on Progress in Blackfriars, Vol. 43, No. 502 (APRIL 1962), pp. 185-187.
- The Gospel and the Church in Blackfriars, Vol. 43, No. 505/506 (JULY - AUGUST 1962), pp. 301-313.
- Holy, Holy, Holy in Life of the Spirit, Vol. 18, No. 203 (JULY 1963), pp. 12-21.
- Words, Facts and God in Blackfriars, Vol. 44, No. 517/518 (JULY/AUGUST 1963), pp. 292-306.
- The Ontology of the Gospel in The Thomist: A Speculative Quarterly Review, vol. 27 (1963), pp. 170-181.
- Philosophy in the Seminary in New Blackfriars, Vol. 46, No. 537 (March 1965), pp. 330-339.
- Some Themes in the Theology of Karl Rahner in Irish Theological Quarterly, Vol. 32, no. 3 (1965) 251-257.
- The Significant Life of a Dominican House of Studies in New Blackfriars, Vol. 48, No. 566 (July 1967), pp. 533-540.
- Priesthood and Ministry in New Blackfriars, Vol. 49, No. 571 (DECEMBER 1967), pp. 121-132.
- The New Dutch Catechism (with Peter Hastings) in New Blackfriars, Vol. 49, No. 572 (JANUARY 1968), pp. 190-198.
- World Religions and Christian Theology in New Blackfriars, Vol. 50, No. 593 (October 1969), pp. 693-699.
- The Concilium World Congress: Impressions and Reflections in New Blackfriars, Vol. 51, No. 607 (December 1970), pp. 555-560.
- A Preface to Theology in Journal of the Anthropological Society of Oxford, Vol. 2, no. 1 (1971), pp. 1–8.
- Metaphor and Ontology in Sacra Doctrina in The Thomist: A Speculative Quarterly Review, vol. 38 no. 3, 1974, pp. 403-425.
- Meaning and Metaphor in Theology in New Blackfriars, Vol. 61, No. 718 (March 1980), pp. 100-112.
- Thinking about Jesus in New Blackfriars, Vol. 61, No. 720 (May 1980), pp. 208-215.

== See also ==
- Fergus Kerr
