= Over Your Cities Grass Will Grow =

- Theatrical release poster
- Directed by: Sophie Fiennes
- Produced by: Sophie Fiennes; Émilie Blézat; Kees Kasander
- Cinematography: Remko Schnorr
- Edited by: Ethel Shepherd
- Music by: Jörg Widmann; György Ligeti
- Production companies: Amoeba Film; Kasander Film Company; Sciapode
- Release date: 16 May 2010 (Cannes)
- Running time: 105 minutes
- Country: France

Over Your Cities Grass Will Grow is a 2010 Sophie Fiennes documentary about the German industrial artist Anselm Kiefer's creation of a 40 hectare work in progress at an abandoned factory complex outside Barjac, France. Kiefer moved to the South of France from Germany in 1993 and began creating his art installation, "La Ribaute" on 35 acres of land belonging to an old silk factory. The film begins with a lengthy silence to show the tunnels and spaces the artist created before showing the artist and his process in creating the installation and a large landscape painting. The film opened at Cannes in 2010 as a special screening.
