= Jennifer Lash =

English novelist and painter (1938–1993)

- Born: Jennifer Anne Mary Alleyne Lash; 27 February 1938; Chichester, Sussex, England
- Died: 28 December 1993 (aged 55); Odstock, Wiltshire, England
- Other names: Jini Fiennes
- Occupations: Novelist, painter
- Spouse: Mark Fiennes (m. 1962)
- Children: 7, including Ralph, Martha, Magnus, Sophie, and Joseph Fiennes
- Parent(s): Henry Alleyne Lash; Joan Mary Moore
- Relatives: Hero Fiennes Tiffin (grandson)

Jennifer Anne Mary Alleyne Fiennes (née Lash; 27 February 1938 – 28 December 1993), also known as Jini Fiennes, was an English novelist and painter.

In 1961, she published The Burial, her first novel, at the age of 23. Lash was regarded as one of the most promising young people among England's artists at the time. Upon meeting Lash in Suffolk, Dodie Smith, who wrote The Hundred and One Dalmatians, remarked that Lash was "almost too interesting to be true".

== Life and career ==
Lash was born at Chichester, West Sussex on 27 February 1938, the daughter of Joan Mary (née Moore) and Brigadier Henry Alleyne Lash. Lash lived in India, where her father was stationed, until the age of six. Her uncle Bill Lash was the Bishop of Bombay from 1947 to 1961. When her family returned to England, they settled in Surrey. Raised Catholic, Lash attended boarding school at the Convent of the Sacred Heart in Tunbridge Wells, Kent, and continued on to Farnham Art School. When she was 16 years old, her studies were cut short by family problems. She discontinued her education and moved to London where she supported herself with odd jobs to support her artistic pursuits.

In the mid-1950s, she met the lyric poet and gallery owner Iris Birtwistle in Churt, Surrey, where they were both living. Shortly afterwards, when Birtwistle moved to Walberswick, Suffolk, Lash went with her and, encouraged by Birtwistle, began work on her first novel, The Burial. Birtwistle renamed Lash "Jini" and introduced her to her future husband Mark Fiennes, whom she married in 1962, the year in which her second book The Climate of Belief was published. There were seven children of the marriage, including actors Ralph Fiennes and Joseph Fiennes, film makers Martha Fiennes and Sophie Fiennes and composer Magnus Fiennes. The family frequently moved and lived in Suffolk, Wiltshire, Ireland and London. Lash wrote four more novels over the next 20 years: The Prism (1963), Get Down There and Die (1977), The Dust Collector (1979) and From May to October (1980).

Lash's paintings were featured in several exhibitions in The Penwith Galleries in St Ives, The Halesworth Gallery and Westleton Chapel Gallery in Suffolk.

In the late 1980s, Lash was diagnosed with breast cancer. While in remission from the disease, she travelled to Lourdes and Saintes-Maries-de-la-Mer in France and to Santiago de Compostela in Spain. During this time, she wrote On Pilgrimage, her only non-fiction book. Lash died on 28 December 1993 at Odstock, Wiltshire, aged 55. Her final novel, Blood Ties, was published posthumously in 1997.
