= David Dusa =

Hungarian and Swedish film director

- Born: May 17, 1979 (age 47); Budapest, Hungary
- Occupation: Film director
- Years active: 2006–present
- Known for: Flowers of Evil
- Awards: Variety's 10 European Directors to Watch (2012)

David Dusa (born May 17, 1979, in Budapest, Hungary) is a Hungarian and Swedish film director.

== Biography ==
David Dusa is a Hungarian born film maker. He grew up in Sweden, having studied film and French at Gothenburg University, he settled in France in 2001.

In 2004, he completed his studies at the French film school CLCF and started working as an assistant for American documentary director Peter Friedman. Between 2006 and 2009, Dusa directed six short-films which won awards at International Film Festivals around the world, including the UIP Award at the Rotterdam International Film Festival, and the Onda Curta Award at the Curtas Vila Do Conde. In 2008–2009, he assisted Andrew Kötting on directing Ivul, and then edited the movie, an official selection at the Locarno Film Festival.

In June 2009, following the Iranian Green Movement, Dusa wrote Flowers of Evil. The movie premiered at the 2010 Cannes Film Festival (ACID selection) and won the '10 European Directors To Watch Award' delivered by Variety and European Film Promotion. Flowers of Evil was released in France on February 8, 2012.

In 2012, David worked as a dramaturge for Belgian choreographer Wim Vandekeybus, on the show, Radical Wrong. Together with Wim, he also co-wrote the screenplay for Galloping Mind. Between 2012 and 2018, David was based in Beijing, where he wrote original scripts and adaptations of western films and books for the Chinese market and worked extensively with actor Feng Xiao Yue.

In 2016, David David co-wrote and edited Pieter-Jan de Pue's The Land of the Enlightened which won the Special Jury Award at the Sundance Film Festival.

Since 2018 David, has adapted Dov Alfon's book, Long Night in Paris into the TV series Menace imminente, together with Leora Kamenetzky and co-written an original series for Yellow Bird. David is also developing an action feature film for Vendôme Films & Baxtory together with Edgar Marie.

David is the co-founder of Dark Riviera, a Stockholm-based intellectual property generator for television, graphic novels and video games, along with producer Emilie Blezat, graphic novelist Sylvain Runberg and video game producer Robert Bäckström.

== Filmography ==
=== Director ===
- 2011 : Flowers of Evil
- 2008 : Distances
- 2007 : Amin
- 2006 : Machine

=== Writer ===
- 2011 : Flowers of Evil
- 2009 : Emeutes des Emotions
- 2009 : Rushes Instables
- 2009 : Wild Beast
- 2008 : Distances
- 2007 : Amin
- 2006 : Machine

=== Editor ===
- 2017: Nothing is Forgiven
- 2016: The Land of the Enlightened
- 2009: Ivul

== Awards and nominations ==
Year	Work	Category	Award !
2011	Flowers of Evil	10 European Directors to Watch	Variety Selection & European Film Promotion
2011	Flowers of Evil	Discovery Award for Best 1st Feature-Film	Namur International Film Festival
2011	Flowers of Evil	Junior Award for Best Feature-Film	Namur International Film Festival
2011	Flowers of Evil	Passeurs D’Images Kyrnea International Award	Cine Junior Festival
2011	Flowers of Evil	Young Audience Award	Cine Junior Festival
2011	Flowers of Evil	Audience Award	Cine Junior Festival
2011	Flowers of Evil	High Schools and Junior High Schools Award	Cine Junior Festival
2011	Flowers of Evil	Mavericks Jury Award – Best 1st Feature Film	Calgary International Film festival
2011	Flowers of Evil	Best Actor in a Leading role	La Normandie Et Le Monde Festival
2011	Flowers of Evil	Best Screenplay	Blue Whiskey Independent Film Festival
2011	Flowers of Evil	Best Editing	Blue Whiskey Independent Film Festival
2007	Amin	UIP Award	Rotterdam International Film Festival
2007	Amin	Onda-Curta Award	Villa Do Conde Short-Length Film Festival
2007	Amin	Best editing (Nominated)	Deutscher Kamerapreis
2007	Amin	Grand Jury Prize	Maremetraggio Film Festival
2007	Amin	Crystal Simorgh Prize	Fajr film festival
2007	Amin	Grand Jury Prize	Rio de Janeiro International Film Festival
2007	Amin	Aprila Jury Mention	Milano International Film Festival
2007	Amin	Best Short Film – Live Action	27th Fajr International Film Festival, "World Panorama" section
