= Mark Fiennes =

English photographer and illustrator (1933–2004)

- Born: Mark Twisleton-Wykeham-Fiennes; 11 November 1933; Dalton, Northumberland, England
- Died: 30 December 2004 (aged 71); Clare, Suffolk, England
- Education: Eton College
- Occupations: Photographer, illustrator
- Years active: 1973–1995
- Spouses: Jennifer Lash (m. 1962; died 1993) Caroline Evans (m. 1996)
- Children: 7, including Ralph, Martha, Magnus, Sophie, and Joseph
- Parent(s): Sir Maurice Fiennes; Sylvia Finlay
- Relatives: Hero Fiennes Tiffin (grandson)

Mark Twisleton-Wykeham-Fiennes (Note: This British person has the barrelled surname Twisleton-Wykeham-Fiennes, but is known by the surname Fiennes.) (11 November 1933 – 30 December 2004) was an English photographer and illustrator. Fiennes was perhaps best known for his architectural studies.

== Biography ==
Mark Twisleton-Wykeham-Fiennes was born at Dalton, Northumberland, the eldest of five children of industrialist Maurice Fiennes and his wife Sylvia Joan (née Finlay). The father was later knighted for his services to the export of British heavy engineering products. Mark Fiennes's third cousin is Sir Ranulph Twisleton-Wykeham-Fiennes, 3rd Baronet.

== Education ==
Fiennes was educated at Eton College for several years before he fell ill with glomerulonephritis, a type of kidney disease. In hope of improving his health, his parents sent him to Australia, New Zealand and the United States, where Fiennes studied agriculture. With his health restored, he returned to England and became a farming tenant on the estate of the Earl of Stradbroke near Blythburgh, Suffolk.

There he met and married novelist Jennifer Lash in 1962 at Lothingland. Her passion for art inspired Fiennes. He took up photography at the age of 40.

== Career ==
Fiennes' photography featured some of the world's most renowned museums as well as Britain's most celebrated estates. In 1985, he received a commission from the National Gallery of Art in Washington D.C. to produce images for their exhibit Treasure Houses of Britain. After this, his photography recorded the restoration of Windsor Castle for the Royal Collections.

He was commissioned to illustrate books for a number of British and American publishers, including HarperCollins, Random House, Thames & Hudson and Yale University Press. Between 1983 and 1995, he regularly contributed to Country Life magazine.

== Family ==
He and Jennifer "Jini" Fiennes (1938–1993) were the parents of actors Ralph Fiennes and Joseph Fiennes, filmmakers Martha Fiennes and Sophie Fiennes, composer Magnus Fiennes and conservationist Jacob ("Jake") Fiennes. They also had a foster son, Michael Emery, an archaeologist.

Jini Fiennes died from breast cancer in 1993, aged 55. Their grandson Hero Fiennes Tiffin is also an actor.

== Final years ==
In 1996, Fiennes married Caroline Evans and lived with her in Clare, Suffolk until his death in 2004, aged 71, from undisclosed causes.

== See also ==
- Treasure Houses of Britain – 1985 television documentary
