= Fergus Kerr =

Scottish Catholic priest and theologian (1931–2025)

The Reverend Fergus Kerr OP FRSE
- Born: 16 July 1931; Banff, Aberdeenshire, Scotland
- Died: 23 November 2025 (aged 94); Edinburgh, Scotland
- Known for: His work on Ludwig Wittgenstein and Thomas Aquinas

Academic work
- Institutions: Blackfriars, Oxford; University of Edinburgh

Fergus Gordon Thomson Kerr OP FRSE (16 July 1931 – 23 November 2025) was a Scottish Catholic priest of the English Dominican province. He published significantly on a wide range of subjects, but was famous particularly for his work on Ludwig Wittgenstein and Thomas Aquinas.

== Biography ==
Following his education at Banff Academy, Kerr studied at the University of Aberdeen where he obtained a First in English language and literature. He also studied philosophy whilst there and was a student of Donald M. MacKinnon and Antony Flew. After graduation, he completed his National Service in the RAF (1953–1955). Kerr entered the Order of Preachers in 1956. He was ordained to the priesthood in 1962. Kerr continued his studies in Paris, Munich, and Oxford. He was a student of John Holloway, and Cornelius Ernst. From 1966 to 1986, he taught philosophy and theology at the University of Oxford.

In service to the English Dominican province, Kerr was Prior at Blackfriars Hall, Oxford from 1969 to 1978. From 1992 to 1998, he served as Prior at Blackfriars, Edinburgh. In 1998, he returned to Blackfriars, Oxford, where he served as Regent until 2004. Kerr served as the inaugural Director of the Aquinas Institute, Blackfriars, Oxford and was the editor of New Blackfriars, the bimonthly journal of the English Dominicans (1995–2020).

At the time of his death, Kerr was affiliated with Blackfriars, Edinburgh. He held an honorary fellowship in the School of Divinity, University of Edinburgh and had a role in the university's Catholic chaplaincy team. He was also an Honorary Professor of St. Andrews University, a distinction he held since 2005. Kerr belonged to the Catholic Theological Association of Great Britain, of which he was president from 1992 to 1994.

A festschrift was prepared in Kerr's honour entitled Faithful Reading.

Kerr was awarded an Honorary degree of Doctor of Divinity by the University of Edinburgh in December 2019.

Kerr died on 23 November 2025, at the age of 94.

== See also ==
- Cornelius Ernst

== Bibliography ==
=== Books ===
- — (1986). Theology After Wittgenstein. Oxford; New York: Blackwell. ISBN 978-0-631-14688-9. OCLC 13003858.
- — & David Nicholls, eds. (1991). John Henry Newman : reason, rhetoric, and romanticism. Carbondale, IL: Southern Illinois University Press. ISBN 978-0-8093-1758-5. OCLC 22909941.
- — (1997). Immortal Longings: versions of transcending humanity. Notre Dame, IN: University of Notre Dame Press. ISBN 978-0-2680-1180-2. OCLC 36407666.
- — (2002). After Aquinas: versions of Thomism. Malden, MA: Blackwell Publishers. ISBN 978-0-631-21312-3. OCLC 49743625.
- — (2007). Twentieth-Century Catholic Theologians: from neoscholasticism to nuptial mysticism. Malden, MA: Blackwell Publishers. ISBN 978-1-405-12083-8. OCLC 64098440.
- — (2007). Contemplating Aquinas: On the Varieties of Interpretation. London: SCM Press. ISBN 978-0-334-02922-9. OCLC 54715171.
- — (2008). "Work on Oneself": Wittgenstein's Philosophical Psychology. Institute for the Psychological Sciences Monograph Series. Vol. 1. Arlington, VA: Institute for the Psychological Sciences Press. ISBN 978-0-9773-1031-9. OCLC 174138810.
- — (2009). Thomas Aquinas: a very short introduction. Very Short Introductions; 214. Oxford; New York: Oxford University Press. ISBN 978-0-1995-5664-9. OCLC 430497008.
- — (2023). From Aberdeen to Oxford: Collected Essays. ATF Press. ISBN 9781923006355.

=== Selected journal articles ===
- Kerr, Fergus (2022). "Anscombe, Ernst And McCabe: Wittgenstein and Catholic Theology". Divus Thomas: 42–70.
- Kerr, Fergus (2021). "The Gilby Summa". New Blackfriars. 102 (1101): 772–794. doi:10.1111/nbfr.12687.
- Kerr, Fergus (2019). "The Summa Theologiae as Itself Prayer? A Proposal by A.N. Williams". Ephemerides Theologicae Lovanienses. 95 (2): 219–233.
- Kerr, Fergus (2017). "John Webster and Catholic Theology". New Blackfriars. 98 (1076): 457–481. doi:10.1111/nbfr.12296.
- Kerr, Fergus (April 2006). "A Different World: Neoscholasticism and its Discontents". International Journal of Systematic Theology. 8 (2): 169–179. doi:10.1111/j.1468-2400.2006.00187.x.
- Kerr, Fergus (January 2004). "Tradition and Reason: Two Uses of Reason, Critical and Contemplative". International Journal of Systematic Theology. 6 (1): 37–49. doi:10.1111/j.1468-2400.2004.00118.x.
- Kerr, Fergus (May 1985). "Pohier's Apologia". New Blackfriars. 66 (779): 205–210. doi:10.1111/j.1741-2005.1985.tb02704.x.
- Kerr, Fergus (June 1984). "The Need for Philosophy in Theology Today". New Blackfriars. 65 (768): 248–260. doi:10.1111/j.1741-2005.1984.tb06776.x.
- Kerr, Fergus (September 1972). "Communes and Communities". New Blackfriars. 53 (626): 402–409. doi:10.1111/j.1741-2005.1972.tb05157.x.

=== Book reviews ===
Year	Review article	Work(s) reviewed
2021	Kerr, Fergus (November 2021). "[Untitled review]". New Blackfriars. 102 (1102): 1015–1017. doi:10.1111/nbfr.12701.	Fitzpatrick, Joseph (2021). Leavis and Lonergan : literary criticism and philosophy. Lanham, Md.: Hamilton Books.
