= Martha Fiennes =

English film director, writer and producer (born 1964)

- Born: Martha Maria Twisleton-Wykeham-Fiennes; 1964 (age 61–62); Suffolk, England
- Occupations: Film director, writer, producer
- Years active: 1999–present
- Partner: George Tiffin (1991–2011)
- Children: 3, including Hero Fiennes Tiffin
- Parents: Mark Fiennes (father); Jennifer Lash (mother)
- Relatives: Ralph Fiennes (brother); Magnus Fiennes (brother); Sophie Fiennes (sister); Joseph Fiennes (brother); Sir Ranulph Fiennes (third cousin, once removed)

Martha Maria Twisleton-Wykeham-Fiennes (Note: This British person has the barrelled surname Twisleton-Wykeham-Fiennes, but is known by the surname Fiennes.) (/ˈfaɪnz/; born 1964) is an English film director, writer and producer. Fiennes is best known for her film Onegin (1999), which starred her elder brother, Ralph, and her subsequent film Chromophobia (2005).

== Career ==
Fiennes made her directorial debut with the film Onegin – an adaptation of Alexander Pushkin's verse novel Eugene Onegin, which starred her brother Ralph in the title role. The film received much praise, and she won the Best Director Award at the Tokyo Film Festival and the Best Newcomer at the London Film Critics' Circle. Fiennes wrote her second feature film in 2005, Chromophobia, an original multi-stranded drama, which comprised an all star cast and which closed the Cannes Film Festival of 2005.

== Personal life ==
Fiennes was born in Suffolk, England to photographer Mark Fiennes (1933–2004) and novelist Jennifer Lash (1938–1993). Her siblings are actors Ralph Fiennes and Joseph Fiennes, documentary film maker Sophie Fiennes, composer Magnus Fiennes, and Jacob Fiennes, a conservationist.

She has three children with George Tiffin, including Hero Beauregard Faulkner Fiennes Tiffin.

Her son Hero, at the age of nine, played a young version of his uncle Ralph's character, Lord Voldemort, in Harry Potter and the Half Blood Prince. Her daughter Mercy was featured in the 2008 film, The Duchess as the Duchess of Devonshire's daughter, Georgiana (Little G).

== Awards and nominations ==
| Year | Association | Category | Work | Result | Notes |
|---|---|---|---|---|---|
| 1999 | London Film Critics' Circle | British Newcomer of the Year | Onegin | Won | |
| 1999 | Tokyo International Film Festival | Best Director | Onegin | Won | |
| 1999 | British Academy Film Awards | BAFTA Award for Outstanding British Film | Onegin | Nominated | |
