= Magnus Fiennes =

English composer, record producer and songwriter

- Born: Magnus Hubert Twisleton-Wykeham-Fiennes; 21 November 1965 (age 60); Suffolk, England
- Occupations: Composer, record producer, songwriter
- Spouse: Maya Fiennes (m. 1995)
- Children: 2
- Parent(s): Mark Fiennes; Jennifer Lash
- Relatives: Ralph Fiennes (brother); Martha Fiennes (sister); Sophie Fiennes (sister); Joseph Fiennes (brother); Hero Fiennes Tiffin (nephew); Sir Ranulph Fiennes (cousin)

Magnus Hubert Twisleton-Wykeham-Fiennes (Note: This British person has the barrelled surname Twisleton-Wykeham-Fiennes, but is known by the surname Fiennes.) (born 21 November 1965) is an English composer, record producer and songwriter.

He has worked with artists such as Shakira, Pulp, Tom Jones and Morcheeba. In 1997 he produced the million-selling All Saints single "Never Ever", which reached number 4 on the US charts and number 1 throughout Europe; producing and co-writing on their eponymous five million selling album.

He composed and produced much of the two multi-million selling albums from the girl quartet Bond. He has composed several major film scores, numerous commercials and TV series, including many seasons of leading BBC dramas such as Hustle, Murphy's Law, and Death in Paradise. He also created, developed and produced the $20 million animated cartoon series Freefonix.

== Records ==
As a producer/arranger programmer and re-mixer, Fiennes has worked with a diverse range of artists including Neneh Cherry, Marianne Faithfull, Gary Moore, the Spice Girls, Bryan Ferry, Hal David, Seal, Yello, Eagle-Eye Cherry, David McAlmont, Ian McCulloch, Roland Gift, Lenny Kravitz, Nigel Kennedy, Daniel Lanois, Trilok Gurtu, Damien Hirst (in the guise of Fat Les's Vindaloo), Dot Allison, Justin Hawkins, Jamelia and Geneva.

Other work includes producing the double platinum Watching Angels Mend for Australian singer-songwriter Alex Lloyd, a collaboration with Canadian violinist Lara St. John on the album Bach with Beats for Sony Classical, co-writing material with Massive Attack and the Sugababes, and co-writing and producing album tracks and singles for Bertine Zetlitz (a Norwegian number one) and Liberty X. Although Fiennes now works primarily in the field of film and TV composition, he was music director on Shakira's The Sun Come Out 2010 World Tour.

Magnus Fiennes continues to develop and consult on US based film and TV projects including developing a TV series for Silver Television/Pictures.

== Work ==
=== Film ===
- Soup (1995)
- Preaching to the Perverted (1997)
- Onegin (1998)
- The Reckoning (2001)
- Peter Cottontail – The Movie (2005)
- Casper's Scare School (2006)
- Chromophobia (2007)
- Donkeys (2010)

=== Television ===
- Pleasureland (2003)
- Hustle (2004–12)
- Vital Signs (2006)
- Murphy's Law (2006–07)
- Five Days (2006)
- The Last Enemy (2007)
- Freefonix (2008–09)
- The Fixer (2008–10)
- Injustice (2011)
- Death in Paradise (2011–present)

=== Film tracks ===
Fiennes has written and produced a number of featured songs including the title song for Paramount's Addicted to Love (featuring Neneh Cherry), Madonna's Next Best Thing and Scala Pictures music business satire, Five Seconds to Spare. Fiennes has produced tracks for Working Title's Rowan Atkinson vehicle, Johnny English, and co-wrote the closing Massive Attack song on their score for the Luc Besson film, Danny the Dog.

=== Live ===
As a keyboard player, Fiennes toured extensively with blues guitarist Gary Moore in a line-up with Pink Floyd's Guy Pratt on bass and Gary Husband on drums. He was Music Director on Shakira's "The Sun Come Out" 2010 World Tour.

== Personal life ==
Magnus Fiennes was born in Suffolk, England, in 1965 to photographer Mark Fiennes and novelist Jennifer Lash. The third child out of six siblings, he is a younger brother to actor Ralph Fiennes and film maker Martha Fiennes, and an older brother to film maker Sophie Fiennes and actor Joseph Fiennes. He also has two daughters, Cheyenne and Shanti, born in 1996 and 1997 respectively.
