= Sophie Fiennes =

English film director and producer

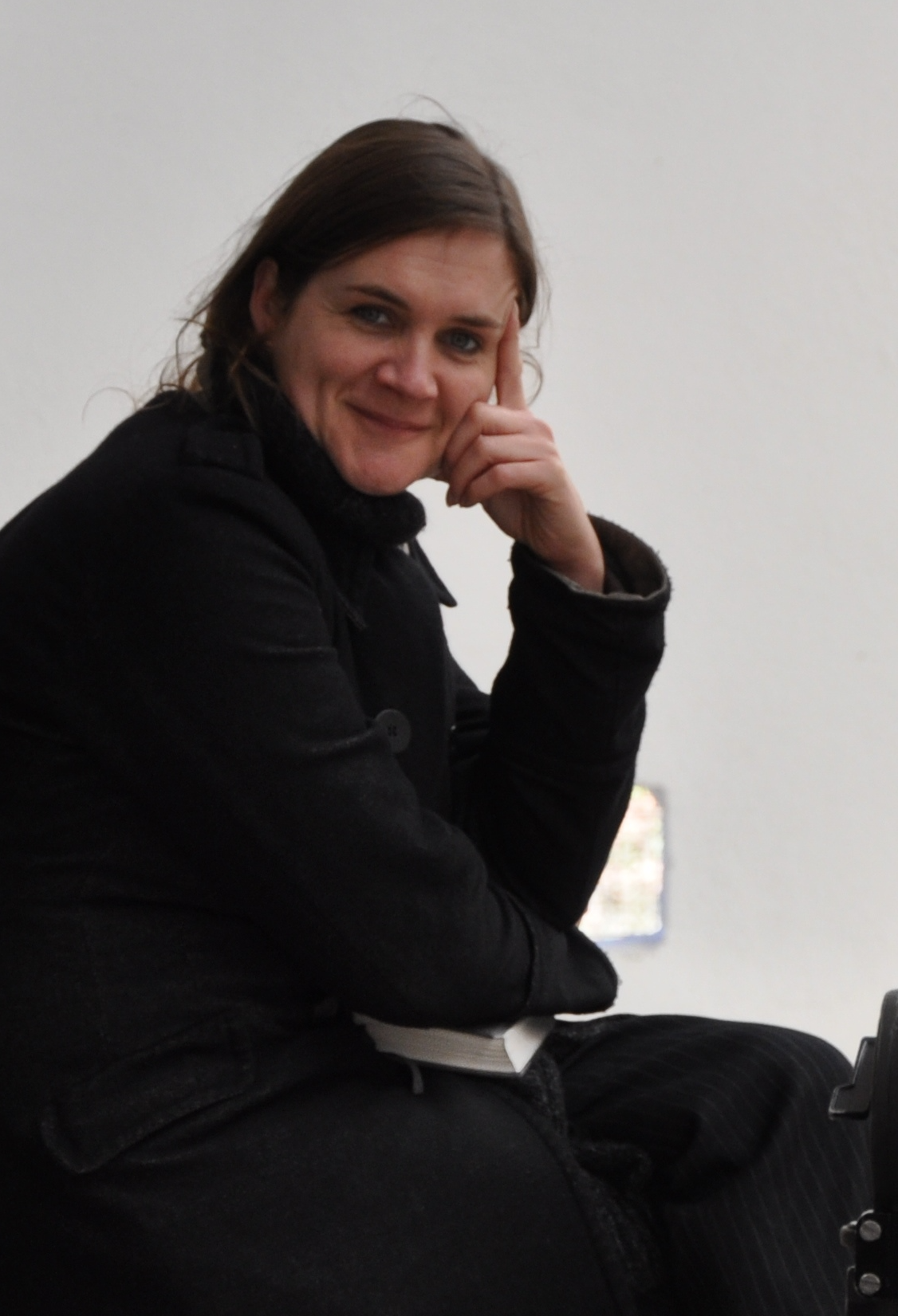
- Sophie Fiennes, photograph by Remko Schnoor
- Born: Sophia Victoria Twisleton-Wykeham-Fiennes; 12 February 1967 (age 59); Ipswich, England
- Occupations: Film director; producer
- Parents: Mark Fiennes (father); Jennifer Lash (mother)
- Relatives: Ralph Fiennes (brother); Martha Fiennes (sister); Magnus Fiennes (brother); Joseph Fiennes (brother); Hero Fiennes Tiffin (nephew); Sir Ranulph Fiennes (cousin)

Sophia Victoria Twisleton-Wykeham-Fiennes, known as Sophie Fiennes (born 12 February 1967), is an English filmmaker best known for Grace Jones: Bloodlight and Bami (2017) and Over Your Cities Grass Will Grow (2010), and for her collaborations with philosopher Slavoj Žižek on The Pervert's Guide to Cinema (2006) and The Pervert's Guide to Ideology (2012).

Fiennes combines observational documentary with staged performance sequences. Reviewing her early work, the critic Danny Leigh wrote that she was "adamant she wants [Michael] Clark – or whoever she happens to be dealing with – to be understood through their work rather than the other way around". Peter Bradshaw described her 2010 film Over Your Cities Grass Will Grow as a "participatory documentary" in which the filmmaker "gets alongside her subject and in some way contributes to the art being created".

Fiennes' work has screened at festivals including Cannes, Toronto, Rotterdam, IDFA and Sundance, and has shown in museums including the Museum of Modern Art in New York, the Hammer Museum in Los Angeles, the Louisiana Museum of Modern Art in Denmark, the Hokkaido Museum of Modern Art in Japan, and the Reina Sofía Museum in Madrid. Tate has acquired the installation current/SEE, a 13-minute extract from her film The Late Michael Clark, produced for the Barbican's 2020 exhibition Michael Clark: Cosmic Dancer.

Fiennes was awarded a NESTA fellowship in 2001 and won the Arte France Cinéma award at Rotterdam's CineMart in 2008. She teaches at University College London, where she is senior tutor on the Creative Documentary by Practice MFA and mentor for the Ethnographic and Documentary Film (Practical) MA. She has also taught at the IDFA summer school and chaired the jury of the Open City Documentary Festival in 2018.

== Early life ==
Fiennes was born in Ipswich, England, the daughter of the photographer Mark Fiennes and the novelist and painter Jennifer Lash (Jini Fiennes). She is the sister of Ralph Fiennes, Martha Fiennes, Magnus Fiennes, Jacob Fiennes and Joseph Fiennes, and the granddaughter of Maurice Fiennes. Her nephew Hero Fiennes Tiffin played the young Lord Voldemort in Harry Potter and the Half-Blood Prince.

The family moved throughout Fiennes' childhood, living at various times in Suffolk, Wiltshire, London, and West Cork and Kilkenny in Ireland, where Mark Fiennes designed and built the family's house and developed his photography practice. His obituary in The Independent described him as "a photographer of extraordinary versatility ... [whose work] reflected his sensitivity to places and people, his perennial sense of humour and, not least, an ingrained dislike of pomposity and hierarchy". Jini Fiennes, whom the novelist Dodie Smith described as "almost too interesting to be true", home-schooled the children, influenced by the Scottish educationalist A. S. Neill.

Fiennes and her siblings helped their parents run Insight Cards, a postcard company selling black-and-white photographs of Ireland taken by Mark and Jini Fiennes; the family sold the business in 1976. Mark Fiennes taught his daughter photography, and Jini Fiennes took her to life-drawing classes at St Edmund's Art Centre, Salisbury, from the age of 11 – an early immersion in observation that Fiennes has described as formative.

== Early career ==
Fiennes attended the Chelsea School of Art foundation course in 1984 and worked as a photographic assistant to Perry Ogden in 1985. Between 1986 and 1991 she held a series of production roles on films directed by Peter Greenaway, including Drowning by Numbers (1988), The Cook, the Thief, His Wife & Her Lover (1989) and Prospero's Books (1991). On the last of these she met the dancer and choreographer Michael Clark, who played Caliban; the two went on to relaunch the Michael Clark Company and produce the stage work Mmm... (1992).

== Style ==
Fiennes began making her own documentary work in the mid-1990s, when digital video cameras made independent production more practicable. She shoots her own observational footage and works with ideas of cinematic staging within non-fiction filmmaking. On 16 mm and 35 mm productions she has often worked with the cinematographer Remko Schnoor, and with Mike Eley on Four Quartets (2022).

Since 2006 Fiennes has edited her own films, at times under the pseudonym Ethel Shepherd. She has described her editing process as an extension of observation rather than narration: "What I'm doing is allowing viewers to engage purely with the visual world, to make it their own." The critic Caryn James called her "a sharp and sensitive observer", and Kristin Hohenadel described her as a director "who isn't afraid to risk alienating audiences with her nonlinear storytelling". Bradshaw has also noted the close collaboration between Fiennes and her subjects in shaping each film's material.

In a 2020 interview, Fiennes described documentary as a practice that precedes the moving image, extending to song, oral tradition, painting and writing; documentation, she said, is "a remainder, a moment witnessed and lost – except for the document."

== Career ==
=== 1998–2001 ===
Fiennes' first short film, Lars from 1–10, in which the Danish director Lars von Trier discusses his Dogme 95 manifesto, premiered at Sundance in 1998.

The Late Michael Clark (1999) combines observational documentary with dance sequences restaged for the camera and shot on 16 mm film. Danny Leigh wrote that "the results are absorbing, inventive and, more unexpectedly, entirely approachable".

In 2001 the London arts organisation Artangel commissioned Fiennes to document Because I Sing, a choral project involving 19 amateur choirs staged by the composer Orlando Gough and the Belgian theatre-maker Alain Platel. It was first broadcast on Channel 4 on 27 May 2001.

=== 2002–2007 ===
Fiennes' first theatrical feature documentary, Hoover Street Revival (2002), uses the sermons of the Pentecostal pastor Noel Jones to frame the life of his Compton, California congregation. Andrew Pulver wrote in The Guardian that Fiennes had "assembled a collage of footage that pays eloquent testimony to the infectious religiosity" of the community.

Fiennes' collaboration with the Slovenian philosopher Slavoj Žižek began with The Pervert's Guide to Cinema (2006), which Peter Bradshaw called "a highly entertaining and often brilliant tour of modern cinema". Žižek later wrote that their aim was "to demonstrate how psychoanalytic cinema-criticism is still the best we have".

VSPRS Show and Tell (2007) documents Les Ballets C de la B's stage work VSPRS, directed by Alain Platel and inspired by Claudio Monteverdi's Vespro della Beata Vergine alongside archival footage of psychiatric patients filmed in 1904. Fiennes filmed the piece with two cameras over seven performances. Fiennes also travelled with Platel to Palestine to make the short film Ramallah! Ramallah! Ramallah! (2005), about his work with the El-Funoun Palestinian Popular Dance Troupe and Ashtar Theatre.

=== 2010–2013 ===
In 2008 the German artist Anselm Kiefer invited Fiennes to document his studio estate, La Ribaute, in the south of France. Over Your Cities Grass Will Grow (2010), shot in cinemascope, records Kiefer's working process; it premiered at the Cannes Film Festival. Bryan Appleyard called it "a wonder" in The Sunday Times, and Peter Bradshaw described it as "a deeply serious meditation on artistic practice and expression". Writing in The Guardian, Charlotte Higgins said the film traced Kiefer's work "with careful, elegant precision", including scenes of the artist pouring molten lead and breaking sheets of glass.

In 2013 Fiennes documented the Chinese painter Liu Xiaodong's London residency in Liu Xiaodong: Half Street, shown alongside his exhibition at the Lisson Gallery, London, from 27 September to 2 November 2013.

The Pervert's Guide to Ideology (2012), Fiennes' second collaboration with Žižek, was called "riveting and often hilarious" by The Hollywood Reporter. Writing in Artforum International, J. Hoberman said the film both represents and explains Žižek's cultural theory.

=== 2017–2024 ===
Grace Jones – sister of Noel Jones, the pastor who featured in Hoover Street Revival – invited Fiennes to make a film about her after seeing that earlier work. Grace Jones: Bloodlight and Bami (2017), made over 12 years, premiered at the Toronto International Film Festival. In The New York Times, Wesley Morris wrote that the film was "a feat of portraiture and a restoration of humanity".

In 2018 Fiennes collaborated with Stopgap Dance Company and the choreographer Lucy Bennett to restage the live performance Artificial Things in a derelict shopping mall; the resulting film won the IMZ Dance on Screen Award in 2019.

In 2022 Fiennes filmed her brother Ralph Fiennes's stage production of T. S. Eliot's Four Quartets. The Financial Times wrote that in her film "the lens and the screen bring a new, even more intimate, perspective".

Acting (2024), shot and edited by Fiennes, follows Declan Donnellan and Nick Ormerod of Cheek by Jowl as they rehearse Macbeth with eight actors in a derelict mansion outside London. It premiered at the Edinburgh International Film Festival and screened at IDFA. Juno Films acquired North American distribution rights in January 2026, and Sovereign Film Distribution acquired UK and Irish rights the following month. The film was released in UK cinemas on 5 June 2026.

The Pervert's Guide to Utopias, Fiennes' third collaboration with Žižek, is an Irish–British–Slovenian co-production between Keeper Pictures, Film Kitchen, P Guide Limited and SPOK Films, with a running time of 120 minutes and completion expected in 2026.

== Filmography ==
- 1998 Lars from 1–10
- 1999 The Late Michael Clark
- 2001 Because I Sing
- 2002 Hoover Street Revival
- 2005 Ramallah! Ramallah! Ramallah!
- 2006 The Pervert's Guide to Cinema
- 2007 VSPRS Show and Tell
- 2010 Over Your Cities Grass Will Grow
- 2012 The Pervert's Guide to Ideology
- 2013 Liu Xiaodong: Half Street
- 2017 Grace Jones: Bloodlight and Bami
- 2018 Artificial Things
- 2022 Four Quartets
- 2024 Acting
- 2026 The Pervert's Guide to Utopias
