= Joseph Fiennes =

English actor (born 1970)

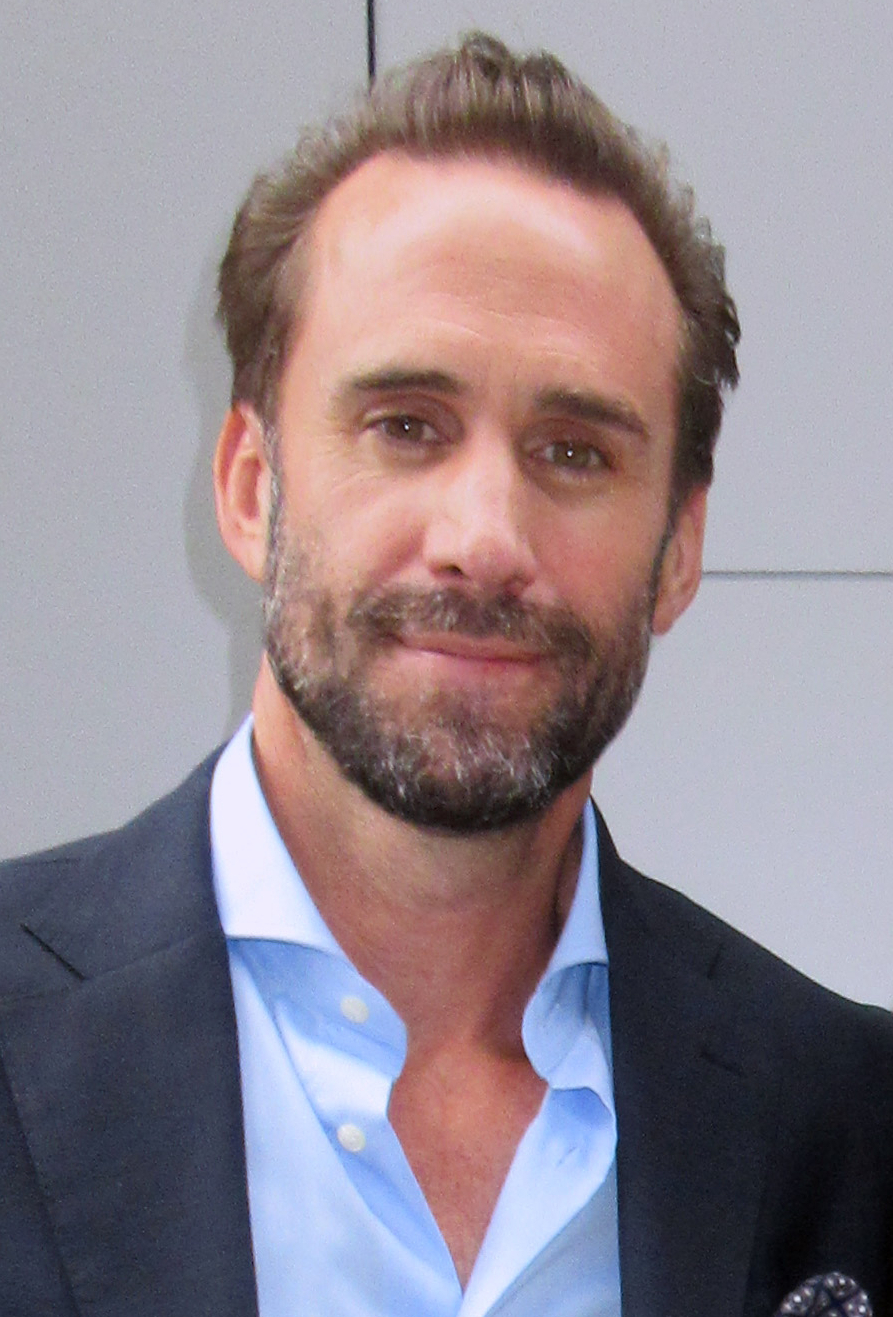
- Fiennes in 2018
- Born: Joseph Alberic Twisleton-Wykeham-Fiennes; 27 May 1970 (age 56); Salisbury, Wiltshire, England
- Education: Guildhall School of Music and Drama (BA)
- Occupation: Actor
- Years active: 1993–present
- Spouse: María Dolores Diéguez (m. 2009)
- Children: 2
- Parents: Mark Fiennes (father); Jennifer Lash (mother)
- Relatives: Ralph Fiennes (brother); Martha Fiennes (sister); Magnus Fiennes (brother); Sophie Fiennes (sister); Hero Fiennes Tiffin (nephew); Ranulph Fiennes (third cousin once removed)

Joseph Alberic Twisleton-Wykeham-Fiennes (Note: This British person has the barrelled surname Twisleton-Wykeham-Fiennes, but is known by the surname Fiennes.) (/faɪnz/; born 27 May 1970), known as Joseph Fiennes, is an English actor. His numerous accolades include an Actor Award as well as nominations for a BAFTA Award and a Laurence Olivier Award.

Fiennes rose to stardom portraying William Shakespeare in the romantic comedy Shakespeare in Love (1998), for which he was nominated for the Actor Award and the BAFTA Award for Best Actor in a Leading Role. He also portrayed Sir Robert Dudley in the biographical drama Elizabeth (1998), Commisar Danilov in the war drama Enemy at the Gates (2001), and Martin Luther in the historical film Luther (2003).

On television, he portrayed Monsignor Timothy Howard in the second season of the TV series American Horror Story (2012–2013). His performance as Commander Fred Waterford in the TV series The Handmaid's Tale (2017–2021) was nominated for the Primetime Emmy Award for Outstanding Supporting Actor in a Drama Series in 2018. On the stage, Fiennes's 2023 portrayal of Gareth Southgate in James Graham's Dear England earned him a nomination for a Laurence Olivier Award for Best Actor.

== Early life and education ==
Joseph Alberic Twisleton-Wykeham-Fiennes was born on 27 May 1970 in Salisbury, Wiltshire, England, the son of Mark Fiennes (1933–2004), a farmer and photographer, and Jennifer Lash (1938–1993), a writer. His siblings are: actor Ralph Fiennes; directors Martha Fiennes and Sophie Fiennes; composer Magnus Fiennes; and conservationist Jacob Fiennes, Joseph's twin brother. They lived mainly in Suffolk as children. His distant cousin is Sir Ranulph (Ran) Fiennes, a decorated English explorer.

Fiennes trained to be an actor at the Guildhall School of Music and Drama in London, graduating in 1993.

== Career ==
=== 1990–1999: Early roles and breakthrough ===
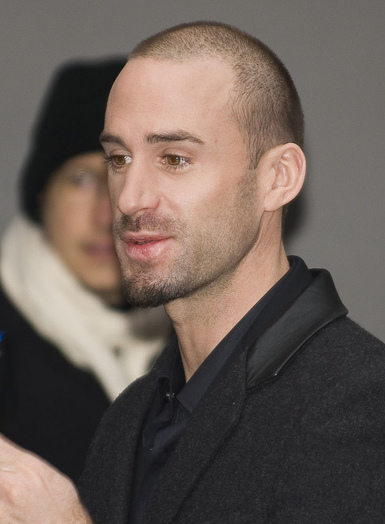
Joseph Fiennes in 2009

Fiennes' first professional stage appearance was in the West End in The Woman in Black, followed by A Month in the Country. He then became a member of the Royal Shakespeare Company for two seasons.

He made his television debut as Willy in the 1995 television film adaptation of The Vacillations of Poppy Carew. His first feature film was 1996's Stealing Beauty. In 1998, Fiennes appeared in two films that were nominated at the Academy Awards: he played Robert Dudley in Elizabeth and he portrayed William Shakespeare in Shakespeare in Love, receiving nominations for the BAFTA Award for Best Actor in a Leading Role and the Actor Award for Outstanding Performance by a Male Actor in a Leading Role.

=== 2000–2016: Established actor ===
In 2001, Fiennes appeared in the film Enemy at the Gates. In 2002, he starred in the independent film Killing Me Softly. In 2003, he lent his voice as Proteus in the DreamWorks animated film Sinbad: Legend of the Seven Seas opposite Brad Pitt. The same year, he starred in the limited-release film Luther, playing Martin Luther, and he also appeared in the 2004 film version of The Merchant of Venice, in which he portrayed Bassanio. Fiennes returned to the theatre in 2006 to perform in the one-man play Unicorns, Almost about World War II poet Keith Douglas at the Old Vic. Also in 2006, he appeared in the films The Darwin Awards, Running with Scissors, and Goodbye Bafana.

Fiennes starred in the ABC science fiction series FlashForward, which debuted on 24 September 2009 and ran through 27 May 2010, as Mark Benford. He starred in Starz's 10-part series, Camelot, as the wizard Merlin. In the second season of American Horror Story, which premiered in October 2012, Fiennes played the role of Monsignor Timothy Howard. In Goodbye Bafana Fiennes portrayed James Gregory, author of the book Goodbye Bafana: Nelson Mandela, My Prisoner, My Friend. He portrayed Roman Tribune Clavius in the 2016 biblical film, Risen alongside his brother's Harry Potter co-star, Tom Felton. Felton shared his recollections of filming scenes with Fiennes in his memoirs and praised his performance.

=== 2017–present ===
From 2017 to 2021, Fiennes starred on the Hulu series The Handmaid's Tale as Commander Fred Waterford. In 2019, he was described in The Guardian as "the go-to actor for English cultural history". In 2023, he appeared in the play Dear England, portraying the England football manager Gareth Southgate.

== Personal life ==
In August 2009, Fiennes married María Dolores Diéguez, a Swiss model and photographer of Spanish/Galician origin, in a Catholic ceremony in Tuscany. They have two daughters. The family resided in Mallorca, Spain near Palma, then later moved back to London.

== Charity work ==
Fiennes was one of the celebrities to design and sign his own card for the UK-based charity Thomas Coram Foundation for Children. The cards were auctioned on eBay in May 2014.

== Acting credits ==
=== Films ===
Year	Title	Role	Notes
1996	Stealing Beauty	Christopher Fox	
1998	Martha, Meet Frank, Daniel and Laurence	Laurence	Released as The Very Thought of You in the US
1998	Elizabeth	Robert Dudley, 1st Earl of Leicester	
1998	Shakespeare in Love	William Shakespeare	
1999	Forever Mine	Manuel Esquema/Alan Riply	
2000	Rancid Aluminum	Sean Deeny	
2001	Enemy at the Gates	Commisar Danilov	
2001	Dust	Elijah	
2002	Leo	Stephen	
2002	Killing Me Softly	Adam Tallis	
2003	Sinbad: Legend of the Seven Seas	Proteus	Voice role
2003	Luther	Martin Luther	
2004	The Merchant of Venice	Bassanio	
2005	The Great Raid	Major Gibson	
2005	Man to Man	Jamie Dodd	
2006	Running with Scissors	Neil Bookman	
2006	The Darwin Awards	Michael Burrows	
2007	Goodbye Bafana	James Gregory	
2008	The Escapist	Lenny Drake	
2008	The Red Baron	Arthur Roy Brown	
2008	You Me and Captain Longbridge	Narrator	
2008	Spring 1941	Artur Planck	
2009	Against the Current	Paul Thompson	
2014	The Games Maker	Morodian	
2014	Hercules	King Eurystheus	
2015	Strangerland	Matthew Parker	
2015	Psy	American man	
2016	Risen	Clavius	
2016	On Wings of Eagles (The Last Race)	Eric Liddell	
2023	The Mother	Adrian Lovell	
TBA	The Way of the Wind	TBA	Post-production

=== Television ===
Year	Title	Role	Notes
1995	The Vacillations of Poppy Carew	Willy	Television film
2008	Pretty/Handsome	Bob Fitzpayne	Unsold TV pilot
2009–10	FlashForward	Mark Benford	22 episodes
2011	Camelot	Merlin	10 episodes
2012–13	American Horror Story: Asylum	Monsignor Timothy Howard	10 episodes
2017	Urban Myths	Michael Jackson	Episode: "Elizabeth, Michael, and Marlon" (Unaired (Note: Casting Fiennes as Jackson was a decision met with controversy, resulting in the episode being pulled from broadcast.))
2017–2021	The Handmaid's Tale	Commander Fred Waterford	36 episodes
2019	Fiennes: Return to the Nile^{†}	Himself	3 episodes
2019	Sherwood	Sheriff Nottingham (voice)	6 episodes
2024	Royal Kill List	Himself	3 episodes
2024	Fiennes Return To The Wild	Himself	Two-part documentary; also features Sir Ranulph Fiennes
2025	Prisoner 951	Richard Ratcliffe	4 episodes
2026	Young Sherlock	Silas Holmes	8 episodes
2026	Dear England	Gareth Southgate	Four-part drama

† released in U.S. as Egypt with the World's Greatest Explorer by the National Geographic

=== Theatre ===
Year	Title	Role	Venue
1993	The Woman in Black	Fortune Theatre, London	
1994	A Month in the Country	Belyaev, Guildford	The Albery Theatre London
1995	A View from the Bridge	Rodolpho	Bristol Old Vic, Strand Theatre London
1996	Les Enfants du Paradis	Lacenaire	Royal Shakespeare Company, London
1996–97	Son Of Man	Jesus Christ	Royal Shakespeare Company, London
1996–97	Troilus and Cressida	Troilus	Royal Shakespeare Company, London
1996–1997	The Herbal Bed	Rafe Smith	Royal Shakespeare Company, London
1997	As You Like It	Silvius	Royal Shakespeare Company, London
1998	Real Classy Affair	Billy	Royal Court Theatre Company, London
2001	Christopher Marlowe's Edward II	Edward II	Crucible Theatre, Sheffield
2001	War Poet's Reading	Performer	Apollo Theatre, London
2002	Othello	Iago	West End, London
2003	Love's Labour's Lost	Berowne	Royal National Theatre, London
2005–06	Epitaph for George Dillon	George Dillon	Royal National Theatre, London
2008	2,000 Feet Away	Deputy	Bush Theatre, London
2009	Cyrano de Bergerac	Cyrano	Chichester Festival Theatre
2016	Ross	T. E. Lawrence	Chichester Festival Theatre
2023	Dear England	Gareth Southgate	Royal National Theatre, London

== Awards and nominations ==
Organizations	Year	Award	Category	Result	Ref.
Actor Awards	1998	Outstanding Cast in a Motion Picture	Shakespeare in Love	Won	
Actor Awards	1998	Outstanding Actor in a Leading Role	Shakespeare in Love	Nominated	
Actor Awards	2017	Outstanding Ensemble in a Drama Series	The Handmaid's Tale (season one)	Nominated	
Actor Awards	2018	Outstanding Actor in a Drama Series	The Handmaid's Tale (season two)	Nominated	
Actor Awards	2018	Outstanding Ensemble in a Drama Series	The Handmaid's Tale (season two)	Nominated	
Actor Awards	2019	Outstanding Ensemble in a Drama Series	The Handmaid's Tale (season three)	Nominated	
Actor Awards	2021	Outstanding Ensemble in a Drama Series	The Handmaid's Tale (season four)	Nominated	
BAFTA Awards	1998	Best Actor in a Leading Role	Shakespeare in Love	Nominated	
Blockbuster Entertainment	1998	Favorite Male Newcomer	Shakespeare in Love	Won	
Critics' Choice Awards	1998	Breakthrough Artist	Elizabeth	Won	
Critics' Choice Awards	1998	Breakthrough Artist	Shakespeare in Love	Won	
Chicago Film Critics Association	1998	Most Promising Actor	Shakespeare in Love	Won	
Cinema for Peace	2008	Best Short Film	The Spirit	Won	
Las Vegas Film Critics Society	1998	Most Promising Actor	Shakespeare in Love	Won	
Laurence Olivier Award	2024	Best Actor	Dear England	Nominated	
MTV Movie & TV Awards	1998	Best Breakthrough Male Performance	Shakespeare in Love	Nominated	
MTV Movie & TV Awards	1998	Best Kiss (with Gwyneth Paltrow)	Shakespeare in Love	Won	
MTV Movie & TV Awards	2019	Best Villain	The Handmaid's Tale	Nominated	
Primetime Emmy Awards	2018	Outstanding Supporting Actor in a Drama Series	The Handmaid's Tale	Nominated	
Satellite Awards	2005	Best Supporting Actor – Motion Picture	The Merchant of Venice	Nominated	
Teen Choice Awards	1998	Sexiest Love Scene (with Gwyneth Paltrow)	Shakespeare in Love	Nominated	
WhatsOnStage Awards	2024	Best Performer in a Play	Dear England	Nominated	

== Discography ==
- 2002 – contributed to the compilation album, When Love Speaks, which consists of Shakespearean sonnets and play excerpts – "Be not afeard, the isle is full of noises" and "Our revels are now ended" (both from The Tempest)
- 2010 – starred in a series of readings of literary love scenes for The Carte Noire Readers.
- Joseph Fiennes reads Presumed Innocent by Scott Turow
- Joseph Fiennes reads The Brightest Star in the Sky by Marian Keyes

== See also ==
- List of actors in Royal Shakespeare Company productions
- List of British actors

== Print sources ==
- Felton, Tom (2023). Beyond the Wand: The Magic and Mayhem of Growing Up a Wizard (Paperback ed.). London: Ebury Publishing. ISBN 9781529149432.
