= Karl Marx in film =

Marx Reloaded features "The Matrix-themed cartoon adventures of Karl Marx, lost in an Alice-style commodity-induced nightmare with only one way out."

Karl Marx and his ideas have been represented in film in genres ranging from documentary to fictional drama, art house and comedy.

The Marxist theories of socialism, communism, class struggle, ideology and political economy influenced early Soviet-era filmmakers such as Dziga Vertov and Sergei Eisenstein. Eisenstein's theory of montage owed its "intellectual basis to Marxist dialectics". However, in addition to his philosophical influence on 20th century cinema and film-makers, Marx's life and times and his principal works have all been represented in film as subjects in their own right.

Eisenstein's project, dating from 1927, to film Marx's book Das Kapital was never realised, although in more recent years the German film director and author Alexander Kluge completed a lengthy homage to Eisenstein's unrealised film entitled News from Ideological Antiquity: Marx – Eisenstein – Das Kapital.

In the 1960s, French new wave directors, notably Jean-Luc Godard, used Marxist themes in their work, including in the films Week End, La Chinoise and Tout va bien.

In the 1970s, the Serbian director Dušan Makavejev made films which were critical and/or satirical of Marx and Marxist ideology.

== Year as Long as Life ==
Year as Long as Life (Russian: Год как жизнь) is a USSR widescreen biopic completed in 1966 about the lives of Karl Marx and Friedrich Engels. The film was directed by Azerbayzhana Mambetova and Grigori Roshal. The film covers one year of the lives of Karl Marx (Igor Kvasha) and Friedrich Engels (Andrei Mironov). The script is also based on a novel by Galina Serebryakova. The film tells about the complex and interesting period in the life of Marx and Engels following the Revolution of 1848. It begins with the narrative of the publication of The Communist Manifesto. After the French Revolution, Marx is expelled from Belgium, and after the start of the revolution in Germany, he moves to Cologne and tries to support the comrades' publication of the Neue Rheinische Zeitung. Then Marx, persecuted by the authorities for their views, must flee with his family to London.

== Marx und Engels - Stationen ihres Lebens ==
In 1978, an 11 part documentary series was produced in the GDR with the name Marx und Engels - Stationen ihres Lebens (Marx and Engels - stations of their lives), featuring many acted scenes of Marx and Engels life.

== Week End ==
Jean-Luc Godard's Week End is a story of a bourgeois Parisian husband and wife who decide to escape to the countryside for the weekend only to be confronted there by the social contradictions of their consumer lifestyle. The film makes frequent references to Marx and revolution, reflecting the wider social issues in France at the time of its production.

== Sweet Movie ==
In Sweet Movie, directed by Dušan Makavejev, a boat with a giant Karl Marx figurehead sailing along a river is a consistent narrative motif. The film includes several characters, such as 'Mr. Kapital' (played by John Vernon), who refer to Marx and Marxist themes.

== News from Ideological Antiquity ==
Helge Schneider as Karl Marx

Alexander Kluge's News from Ideological Antiquity: Marx – Eisenstein – Das Kapital, is an experimental film which explores “the Marxian attention to the production, distribution and consumption at work behind the phenomenological surface of everyday life and experience.” The film is composed of what the Marxist critic Frederic Jameson calls "fragments", akin to "Freudian free association", rather than a conventional and linear narrative. Instead of representing Marx's book Capital, the film is therefore a study of the difficulty facing Eisenstein, or any other director, in trying to represent such a work and the ideas contained in it.

Apart from the more conceptual passages in the film – whose overall running time is a lengthy 570 minutes – comedian Helge Schneider impersonates Marx in several scenes.

== Marx Reloaded ==
Marx Reloaded, written and directed by the British theorist Jason Barker, is a partly animated documentary film which investigates the contemporary relevance of Marx's ideas in the context of the 2008 financial crisis. The film asks whether "(we) should ... accept the crisis as an unfortunate side-effect of the free market" or whether there is "another explanation as to why it happened and its likely effects on our society, our economy and our whole way of life." The film interviews several leading Marx-inspired philosophers and critics including Michael Hardt, Antonio Negri, Jacques Rancière, Peter Sloterdijk, Alberto Toscano and Slavoj Žižek.

In addition to its Marxian analysis the film follows "The Matrix-themed cartoon adventures of Karl Marx, lost in an Alice-style commodity-induced nightmare with only one way out."

== Monty Python's Flying Circus ==
At least two episodes of the BBC TV comedy series Monty Python's Flying Circus include sketches depicting Marx in modern-day settings, and which lampoon the presumed gravity of his thinking. In one episode Marx competes in a TV quiz show for a lounge suit but fails to win when the show's host poses him a prosaic question about football.

== The Young Karl Marx ==
The Young Karl Marx is a 2017 film about Young Marx directed by Raoul Peck starring August Diehl. It traces events in the life of young Marx in the 1840s until the writing of Communist Manifesto and has been positively reviewed by Peter Bradshaw who thought the film absorbing.

== The Leader ==
The Leader is an animation series co-produced by the Chinese government's Office for the Research and Construction of Marxist Theory about Marx's life, friendship, romance, and "his contributions to class struggle and the revolutionary movement."

== Marx filmography ==
Films in which Karl Marx is represented and/or in which his ideas or principal works comprise the main narrative theme:

=== Fiction ===
- 1967 Week End. Directed by Jean-Luc Godard.
- 1968 Mohr und die Raben von London (Moor and the Ravens of London). Directed by Helmut Dziuba.
- 1974 Sweet Movie. Written and directed by Dušan Makavejev.
- 1979 Karl Marx. The Early Years (Die jungen Jahre). Germany-USSR. Parts 1–7.
- 2004 "The Fever". Directed by Gabriel Nero.
- 2010 The Germans – Karl Marx and the Class struggle (Die Deutschen – Karl Marx und der Klassenkampf)
- 2012 The Meeting of the Century (Encontro do século) produced by UNIVESP TV
- 2014 Marx is back (Marx Ha Vuelto) (Argentina)
- 2016 The Limehouse Golem portrayed by Henry Goodman
- 2017 The Young Karl Marx (Le jeune Karl Marx). Directed by Raoul Peck.
- 2020 Miss Marx, about Marx's daughter Eleanor. Portrayed by Philip Gröning.

=== Documentary ===
- 1983 The Spectre of Marxism. Script by Stuart Hall. Produced by Thames Television.
- 1986 Manifestoon. Directed by Jesse Drew.
- 2002 The Mark Steel Lectures. Series 1, episode 6. Produced by BBC.
- 2005 Heaven on Earth: The Rise and Fall of Socialism. Episode 1. PBS, US.
- 2008 Karl Marx – Ein Philosoph macht Geschichte (Karl Marx: A Philosopher Makes History). Directed by Gernot Jaeger and Carsten Jaeger.
- 2011 Marx Reloaded. Written, directed and co-produced by Jason Barker. Medea Film / Films Noirs / Arte / ZDF.
- 2016 Genius of the Modern World: Karl Marx. Episode 1, BBC.

=== Art film ===
- 1999 Wandering Marxwards. Directed by Michael Blum and produced at the Banff Center for the Arts, Alberta, Canada.
- 2008 Nachrichten aus der ideologischen Antike - Marx/Eisenstein/Das Kapital (News from Ideological Antiquity: Marx – Eisenstein – Das Kapital). Directed by Alexander Kluge.

=== Comedy ===
- 1970 Monty Python's Flying Circus, episode 25: 'World Forum/Communist Quiz'.
- 1972 Monty Python's Fliegender Zirkus, episode 2: 'The Philosophers' Football Match'. Directed by Ian MacNaughton.
- 2023 Epic Rap Battles of History, episode 87: "Henry Ford vs. Karl Marx.

== See also ==
- Cinema of the Soviet Union
- Dušan Makavejev
- Jason Barker
- Jean-Luc Godard
- Marx Reloaded
- Sweet Movie
- Week End

== Sources ==
- Frederic Jameson in New Left Review, July–August 2009.
- Karl Marx: Ein Philosoph macht Geschichte at Amazon.
- 'World Forum – Communist Quiz' in Monty Python’s Flying Circus, episode 25 at YouTube.
- Mohr und die Raben von London at the Internet Movie Database.
- News from Ideological Antiquity at the Goethe Institut.
