= Michael Blum =

Michael Blum may refer to:

- Michael Blum (musician) (born 1993), American jazz musician
- Michael Blum (artist) (born 1966), Israeli artist
- Michael Blum (footballer) (born 1988), German footballer
- Mike Blum (1943–2008), Canadian football player
