= Jason Barker =

British film director & philosopher (born 1971)

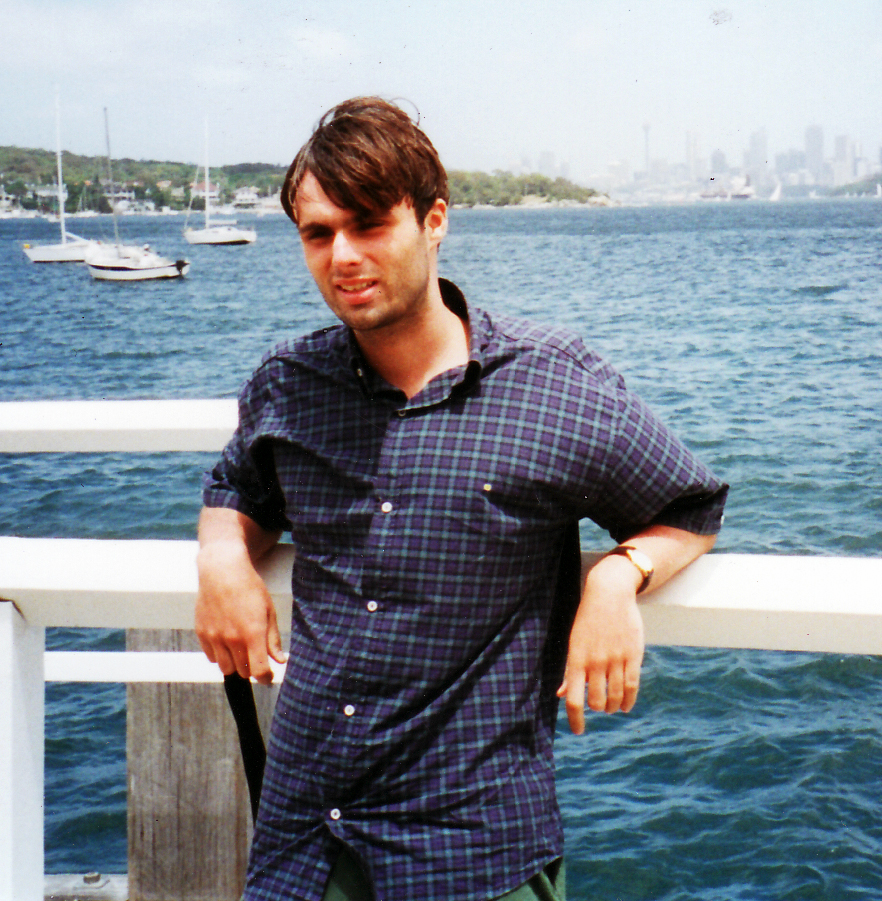
- Jason Barker in 2008
- Born: 1971 (age 54–55); London, England
- Occupations: Scholar of philosophy, novelist, film director, screenwriter, producer

Academic background
- Education: Surrey Institute of Art & Design, University College (1995); Cardiff University (PhD, 2003)

Academic work
- Institutions: Kyung Hee University
- Main interests: Karl Marx, Alain Badiou, Jacques Lacan
- Notable works: Marx Returns; Marx Reloaded

Jason Barker (born 1971) is a British scholar of contemporary French philosophy, a novelist, film director, screenwriter, and producer. He is Honorable Professor at Kyung Hee University in the College of Foreign Language and Literature, where he teaches a masters course on Marxism and Literature with the British philosopher Ray Brassier. He was previously a visiting professor at the European Graduate School, having taught in the Faculty of Media and Communication alongside Alain Badiou, Judith Butler, Jacques Rancière, Avital Ronell, Slavoj Žižek, and others.

Most notable for his translation and introductions to the philosophy of Alain Badiou, Barker draws on an eclectic range of influences including neoplatonism, Lacanian psychoanalysis, and Marxism. Writing in both the English and French languages, Barker has also contributed to debates in post-Marxism.

== Early life ==
Barker was born in London, England. He studied at the Surrey Institute of Art & Design, University College, and graduated with a degree in media studies in 1995. He then studied philosophy at Cardiff University, obtaining a PhD in 2003.

== Karl Marx ==
In an article published in The Guardian in February 2012, Barker criticised the selective interpretation of Karl Marx's writings by economists such as Nouriel Roubini (who declared: "Karl Marx was right") when responding to the global recession. According to Barker, such interpretations water down the revolutionary aspects of Marx's ideas and focus unduly on their reformist tendencies.

Writing in The New York Times on the occasion of the Marx bicentennial anniversary, Barker argued: "The key factor in Marx’s intellectual legacy in our present-day society is not 'philosophy' but 'critique,' or what he described in 1843 as 'the ruthless criticism of all that exists: ruthless both in the sense of not being afraid of the results it arrives at and in the sense of being just as little afraid of conflict with the powers that be'".

== Marx Returns ==
Barker is the author of the novel Marx Returns. The story focuses on the life of Karl Marx and his struggle to write his major work on political economy, Capital. Philosopher Ray Brassier described it as "[c]urious, funny, perplexing, and irreverent". According to Nina Power, reviewing the work in the Los Angeles Review of Books, Marx Returns is "an imaginative, uplifting, and sometimes disturbing alternative history".

== Marx Reloaded ==
Barker is the writer, director and producer of the 2011 partly animated documentary film Marx Reloaded, which considers the relevance of Marx's ideas after the 2008 financial crisis. The film includes interviews with several distinguished philosophers including Michael Hardt, Antonio Negri, Jacques Ranciere, Nina Power, John N. Gray, Alberto Toscano, Peter Sloterdijk and Slavoj Žižek.

The London Evening Standard cited the film alongside the 2012 re-edition of The Communist Manifesto and Owen Jones' best-selling book Chavs: The Demonization of the Working Class as evidence of a resurgence of left-wing ideas. Little White Lies described an "engaging hour-long talking-head-meets-animation doc" and "a compelling dialogue of Marx's theories on capitalism as they apply to its contemporary form."

British philosopher Simon Critchley has described Marx Reloaded as "a great introduction to Marx for a new generation" while German political scientist Herfried Münkler has called it "the type of film that Marx himself would have approved of".

== Select bibliography ==
=== Fiction ===
==== Novels ====
- Marx Returns, Winchester: Zero Books, 2018, ISBN 9781785356605.

==== Short stories ====
- "Justine & Jacquie and their adventures on the other side (an excerpt)" (with Justin Clemens) in Meanjin Vol. 82, no. 2, Winter 2023 (Melbourne University Press), pp. 146–159 ISSN 0025-6293.
- "The Greatest Love of All" Communis (Aug 10, 2025)
- "Halo" Communis (Sept 28, 2025)
- "Halo (Part 2)" Communis (Sept 30, 2025)

=== Poetry ===
- "Chancing on Byzantium" (with Justin Clemens) in Crisis and Critique 12, 2025, Issue 2. ISSN 2311-8172.
- "Blanqui" Communis (May 9, 2026)
- "The Spider" Communis (August 21, 2026)

=== Nonfiction ===
==== Authored books ====
- Alain Badiou: A Critical Introduction, London: Pluto Press, 2002, ISBN 9780745318004.

==== Edited collections ====
- 맑스 재장전: 자본주의와 코뮤니즘에 관한 대담 [Marx Reloaded - A Conversation on Capitalism and Communism], Seoul: Nanjang Publishing House, 2013. ISBN 9788994769134.
- "Other Althussers", Special issue of diacritics, with G. M. Goshgarian (Vol. 43.2, 2015), ISSN 0300-7162.
- "Marginal Thinking: A Forum on Louis Althusser", Los Angeles Review of Books, May 15, 2016 online.
- "Fail Better: Politics and the Arts of Tragedy", Special issue of Filozofski Vestnik 39, 2018, No. 2. ISSN 0353-4510.
- "Karl Marx Bicentennial Forum", Los Angeles Review of Books, March 16, 2018 online.

==== Translations ====
- Alain Badiou, Metapolitics, trans. and with an introduction by Jason Barker, London: Verso Books, 2005, ISBN 9781844670352.

==== Articles ====
- "The Topology of Revolution" in Communication and Cognition (Vol. 36, no. 1/2, 2003), ISSN 0378-0880.
- "Principles of Equality: on Alain Badiou's Manifesto for Philosophy, Deleuze: The Clamor of Being, and Ethics. An Essay on the Understanding of Evil" in Historical Materialism (No. 12.1, 2004), ISSN 1465-4466.
- "Topography and Structure" in Polygraph (no. 17, 2005), ISSN 1533-9793.
- "Nous, Les Sans-Marxisme" in Gilles Grelet (ed.), Théorie-rébellion: Un Ultimatum, Paris: L’Harmattan, 2005, ISBN 2747592103.
- "Nothing Personal: From the State to the Master" in Prelom (no. 8, 2006), ISSN 1451-1304.
- "De L'État au Maître: Badiou et le post-marxisme" in Bruno Besana et Oliver Feltham (eds.) Ecrits Autour de la Pensée d’Alain Badiou, Paris: L’Harmattan, 2006, ISBN 9782296026858.
- “Wherefore Art Thou Philosophy? Badiou without Badiou” in Cosmos and History: The Journal of Natural and Social Philosophy (Vol. 8.1, 2012), ISSN 1832-9101.
- "Master Signifier: A Brief Genealogy of Lacano-Maoism" in Filozofia (Vol. 69, no. 9, 2014), ISSN 0046-385X.
- "Epic or Tragedy? Karl Marx and Poetic Form in The Communist Manifesto" in Filozofia 71, 2016, No. 4, pp. 316–327.
- "First as farce, then as tragedy: Louis Rossel and the Civil War in France" in Filozofski Vestnik 39, 2018, No. 2. ISSN 0353-4510.
- "Socialism's Encore" (with Justin Clemens) in Filozofski Vestnik 40, 2019, No. 3. ISSN 0353-4510.
- "Quentin Tarantino’s Cartoon Violence" in Animation 16, 2021, Issue 1-2. ISSN 1746-8477.
- "Disney’s Wagner Aesthetic: Music Drama in Pursuit of the Total Artwork" in Animation 19, 2024, Issue 1. ISSN 1746-8477.
- "Can Leninism Be Thought?" in Crisis and Critique 11, 2024, Issue 2. ISSN 2311-8172.

=== Filmography ===
- Marx Reloaded. A Film by Jason Barker. Germany/UK: 2010. Medea Film – Irene Höfer/Films Noirs/ZDF/Arte; 52 minutes.

== See also ==
- Marx Reloaded
- Marx Returns
