= Marx Returns =

2018 novel by Jason Barke

- Author: Jason Barker
- Illustrator: Kerstin Hille
- Cover artist: Jason Barker and Eugen Slavik
- Language: English
- Publisher: Zero Books
- Publication date: 23 February 2018
- Publication place: United Kingdom
- Media type: Print (paperback) and ebook
- Pages: 352
- ISBN: 978-1-78535-660-5

Marx Returns is the debut novel by the British writer and filmmaker Jason Barker. It tells the story of the German philosopher Karl Marx and his struggle to complete his magnum opus Capital.

== Reception ==
Reviewing Marx Returns in the Los Angeles Review of Books, Nina Power described it as "an imaginative, uplifting, and sometimes disturbing alternative history". Writing for The Australian, Peter Beilharz declared that "The story that Barker tells is incredibly witty, clever, and creative. It is amusing and entertaining as well as instructive."

Barker discussed his novel at the British Library’s Karl Marx bicentennial event on 5 May 2018. Other invited speakers were Clive Coleman and Richard Bean, writers of the 2017 West End play Young Marx, along with "the team behind Raoul Peck’s film The Young Karl Marx". The event was moderated by Eleanor Marx biographer Rachel Holmes.

In an interview with Marx200, a German commemorative website set up by the Rosa Luxemburg Foundation, Barker observes that "Marx Returns is not a philosophical novel" and is "an adventure story."
