= The Jew of Linz =

1998 book by Kimberley Cornish

- Cover of the first edition
- Author: Kimberley Cornish
- Language: English
- Subject: Ludwig Wittgenstein
- Publisher: Century Books, an imprint of Random House; In Germany as Der Jude aus Linz: Hitler und Wittgenstein (1998) by Ullstein Verlag
- English publication date: 1998
- Media type: Print
- Pages: 298
- ISBN: 0-7126-7935-9
- LC Class: B3376.W564

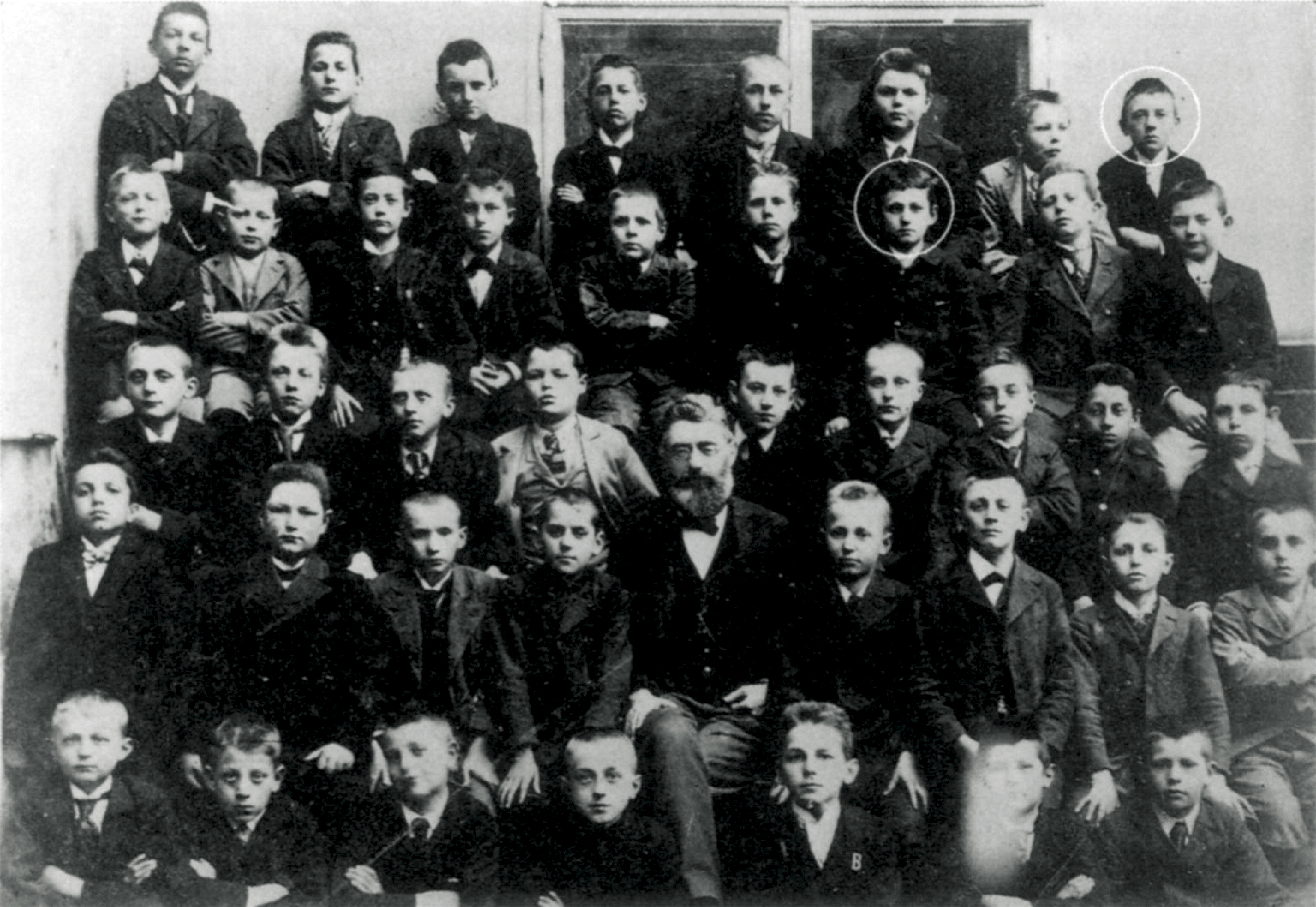
Class photograph at the Linz Realschule c. 1901, a young Adolf Hitler in the back row on the right. In the penultimate row, third from the right, a student who is said by Cornish (dating the photo to c. 1904) to be Ludwig Wittgenstein. The adult is Oskar Langer who taught at the school until 1901.

The Jew of Linz is a 1998 book by Australian writer Kimberley Cornish, in which the author presents the fringe theories that philosopher Ludwig Wittgenstein was the childhood catalyst for the antisemitism of Adolf Hitler and that Wittgenstein was involved in the Cambridge Five Soviet spy ring. Cornish is also responsible for the claim that a school photo that features Hitler also shows Wittgenstein, though it has been reliably dated to two years before the latter's time at the Realschule in Linz. There is no evidence the two ever knew each other.

Despite being only days apart in age, Hitler and Wittgenstein were never in the same class, or indeed year (or grade) at the secondary school. Cornish himself did not claim otherwise, though neither did he clearly acknowledge it. Hitler and Wittgenstein only overlapped at Linz over the academic year of 1903/1904, not 1904/1905 as is often wrongly stated, Hitler having spent that later year at the Realschule in Steyr. Cornish, like Hitler in Mein Kampf, is entirely silent about the year at Steyr and also finds a novel way to be wrong about the time Wittgenstein arrived at Linz by suggesting it was in 1904, but it was in the second semester of the 1903/1904 academic year.

== Contents ==
=== Summary ===
1. The occasion for Adolf Hitler becoming anti-Semitic was a schoolboy interaction in Linz, circa 1904, with Ludwig Wittgenstein.
2. Wittgenstein joined the Comintern, and as a Trinity College don, and a member of the Cambridge Apostles, Wittgenstein recruited fellow Apostles Guy Burgess, Kim Philby and Anthony Blunt, all students at Trinity—as well as Donald Maclean from nearby Trinity Hall—to work for the Soviet Union.
3. Wittgenstein was responsible for the secret of decrypting the German "Enigma" code being passed to Joseph Stalin, which resulted ultimately in the Nazi defeats on the Eastern Front and liberation of the surviving Jews from the camps.
4. Both Hitler's oratory and Wittgenstein's philosophy of language derive from the hermetic tradition, the key to which is Wittgenstein's "no-ownership" theory of mind, described by P. F. Strawson in his book Individuals (1958).

=== Realschule ===
==== The photograph ====
Cornish claims that "a photograph of Hitler aged fourteen at the school also shows the fourteen-year-old Wittgenstein". (Note: Though as journalist Carlos Widmann noted, Hitler and the other boy look younger than 14.) Dating it to 1904, (Note: Cornish, Kimberley. "The boy who haunted Hitler; Book Extract." Sunday Times [London, England], 8 Mar. 1998, p. 1. Gale A59993637 "Ludwig was educated at home by governesses and tutors for his first 14 years, but his father decided in 1904 to send him away ... to a state school in the provinces. ...Wittgenstein arrived in the second term of 1904." cf. Beaney (2023)) Cornish says the Victoria Police photographic evidence unit in Australia examined the photograph and confirmed that it was "highly probable" the other boy is Wittgenstein. "The matter of the photograph" writes Cornish, "is clearly of great significance for our hypothesis". Why two boys not in the same class would be together in the photograph was a question raised by Gerald Stieg. Cornish, in the Notes, says only that "It appears to be the photograph of an age group, not a class."

The photo was published with the caption "Professor Oskar Langer mit der Klasse I b , 1900/1901 Rechts oben der 12jährige Adolf Hitler"(Professor Oskar Langer with Class I b, 1900/1901. Top right: 12-year-old Adolf Hitler) in both Hugo Rabitsch's Aus Adolf Hitlers Jugendzeit (1938) and contemporary publicity for that book in Börsenblatt. The photograph also appears in multiple other near contemporary sources that all identify it as a class photograph featuring Hitler in his first year or at an age he would have been during it. (Note: The same photograph appears in the 1939 illustrated translation of Mein Kampf by James Vincent Murphy which describes it as showing "young Adolf .. as an eleven-year-old schoolboy" with his classmates. It can also be found in a 1953 memoir of the young Hitler by August Kubizek with the caption "ein Bild aus der ersten Klasse der Linzer Realschule" (a picture from the first Class of Realschule in Linz). and its abridged 1954 translation. It also appears in Hitlers Jugend (1956) by Franz Jetzinger, and repeated in the 1958 translation is the information that it shows Hitler in "a photograph of the first class in the Linz Realschule". The latter is directly cited by Cornish for other reasons but he is silent, at least in the English edition, about its use of the photograph and description of it.) A portrait of Langer on the same page of Rabitsch's book is captioned "Hitlers Klassenvorstand 1900/1901" (Hitler's class teacher 1900/1901). Langer has been established by Hermann Möcker as having worked at the school from 1884 only until 1901.

At the time of Cornish's publication, historian Brigitte Hamann dated the photograph to 1900 or 1901 for Focus magazine. (Note: Hamann also told Der Spiegel it predated 1903 and that the child near Hitler was not Wittgenstein. German government library sources date the photograph to circa 1901, American ones to June 1901.) Since then, German historian Werner Maser has insisted that, contra Cornish, it is "Ein Foto der Linzer Realschulklasse 1B. des Schuljahres 1900–1901" (a photograph of the Linz Realschule class 1B from the school year 1900–1901), Austrian historian Roman Sandgruber has asserted it is from 1901 and Israeli historian Steven E. Aschheim has also said it has been "reliably dated" to that year. Wittgenstein did not arrive at Linz until the 1903/1904 academic year, as Cornish himself acknowledges.

==== Wittgenstein and Hitler at Linz ====
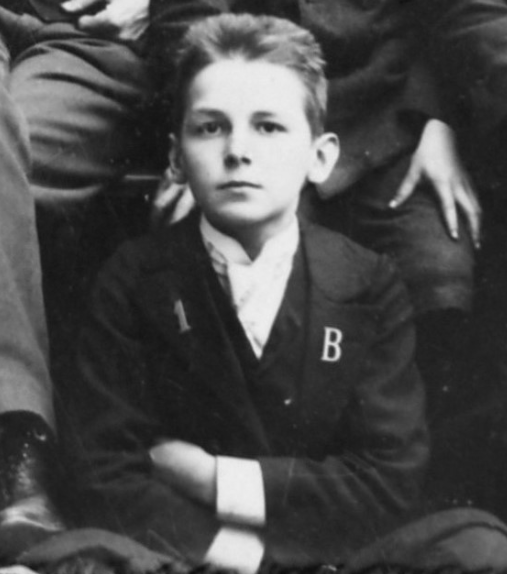
Extract from the Linz Realschule photo. Visual examination of the supposed Hitler/Wittgenstein photograph is itself indicative of it being a '1b' class group. Only Hitler was ever a first year pupil there, and in that class group (1900/1901).

Hitler started at the school in September 1900, repeated the first year in 1901/1902, and left in autumn 1904 to spend the 1904/1905 academic year at the Realschule in Steyr. The year at Steyr is discussed by Franz Jetzinger and by Joachim Fest near to passages Cornish quotes, and by Alan Bullock on a page of Hitler: A Study in Tyranny that he cites. Yet, Cornish makes no mention of Hitler's time there. Möcker charitably allows for the possibility that Cornish is unaware of Hitler's year at Steyr (Hitler being silent about it in Mein Kampf). But he also does not discount the idea that Cornish withheld knowledge of it because it did not fit his desired narrative of a close relationship between Hitler and Wittgenstein in Linz. "Blatant manipulation of secondary sources" is a charge levelled against Cornish by Claudia Pugh-Thomas.

Cornish asserts that Wittgenstein arrived at Linz in 1904, during the "second semester of the academic year 1903/4". (Note: The Austrian academic year for secondary education is divided into two semesters and classes usually run from September to June or July.) The citation given suggests this is a misunderstanding of Wuchterl and Hübner (1979) whose talk of the second semester is about the classes missed by Wittgenstein following the suicide of his brother Rudolf on 2 May 1904, (Note: Oddly Cornish renders his (untranslated) quotation from Wuchterl and Hübner (1979) p.28 as 'Ludwig versaumte damals in Linz, wo er die Realschule besuchte, viele Unterrichtsstunden; im zweiten Semester 1903/04 waren es, im Jahre darauf sogar.' i.e. he deletes the numbers of lessons missed by Wittgenstein in the second semester of 1903/1904 and in the following academic year (124 and 425, respectively).) It is not about when Wittgenstein began schooling at Linz, which is given by the same authors later as autumn 1903. Brian McGuinness, like Ray Monk, also reports that it was in 1903 that Wittgenstein was sent to Linz. (Note: Ray Monk erroneously gives the year that Hitler and Wittgenstein overlapped at the Linz Realschule as 1904–1905 but, almost immediately afterwards, correctly states that Wittgenstein was there from 1903 until 1906. Cornish refers to the first claim but not the second.) Later scholarly commentary reasserts this and that Wittgenstein and Hitler were together at the Linz Realschule from 1903 to 1904.

While Hitler was just six days older than Wittgenstein, they were two grades apart at the school, Hitler having repeated the first year and Wittgenstein being advanced a year, as McGuinness records (and Cornish quotes without correction). There is no evidence that the two got to know each other. But, as, Aschheim notes, this did not deter Cornish from asserting that the cause of Hitler's 'genocidal anti-Semitism' is a supposed 'schoolboy spat' with Wittgenstein. Even though, as Ray Monk is quoted as commenting, "at this time Wittgenstein was not obviously Jewish: He had never been to a synagogue, was brought up a Catholic and considered himself to be ethnically German."

==== The Jew of Linz ====
Cornish's thesis is that the young Wittgenstein was "the very first link in the chain of hatred that led to Auschwitz" and the one Jewish boy from Hitler's school days referred to in Mein Kampf. The last claim referred to the following, as quoted by Cornish:

At the Realschule, to be sure, I did meet one Jewish boy who was treated by all of us with caution, but only because various experiences had led us to doubt his discretion and we did not particularly trust him ...

— Adolf Hitler, Mein Kampf, 1943 translation by Ralph Manheim, as quoted by Cornish.

"This paragraph — a mere forty words in English translation — is the focus of our investigation" writes Cornish. Though, as Nicholas Mosley points out:

in the next sentence Hitler goes on to say about the boy (and Mr Cornish does not quote this): "Beyond that, my companions and myself formed no particular opinions in regard to him." And a few lines later Hitler is explaining that at this time ... hearing hostile remarks about Jews ... aroused in him "a feeling of abhorrence". (Mr Cornish does not mention this either.)

Thus Hitler, whilst denying that he was yet anti-Semitic, (Note: Contrary to some reports, Hitler does not record that he became anti-Semitic because of a Jewish schoolmate in Mein Kampf (or elsewhere).) does refer to a Jewish boy at 'the Realschule' but, as Steven Poole notes, "only due to his lack of 'discretion', rather than his race". As Sean French writes, there is "No evidence that Hitler, in his final unhappy year, even knew a boy two years above him. If they did know each other, there is no evidence that [Wittgenstein] was the boy Hitler distrusted". Still, as Richard J. Evans notes, "Cornish speculates that this boy was Wittgenstein" and as Poole notes "reads this as a revelation of how Hitler's anti-Semitism took root".

Möcker suggests the passage could just as easily refer to an incident in Steyr where Hitler had a Jewish classmate. That pupil has been identified as Josef Sommer, the son of the owner of the Reichraming brass factory in the Steyr-Land district. Even if Hitler were referring to Linz, as Maser notes, since 17 of the 329 pupils in 1903 were Jewish, it cannot be assumed that Hitler meant Wittgenstein. And those practising Jews, unlike Wittgenstein, would normally be identifiable as Jewish to their fellow pupils by their absence from Mass.

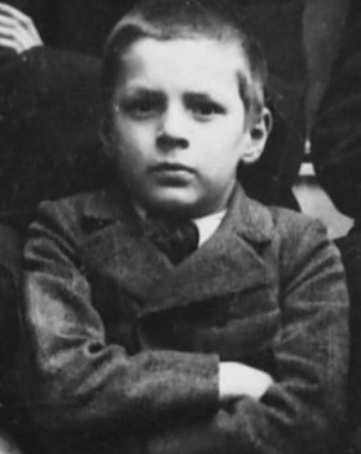
Josef Keplinger

Sandgruber, following Mocker, suggests a more likely candidate than Wittgenstein as 'the jew of Linz' is Hans Hatschek (1890–1956), son of the locally-based industrialist Ludwig Hatschek, who spent three years in the same class as Hitler (from 1901). Hatschek, though Catholic like Wittgenstein, was a first-degree Mischling by Nazi racial doctrine as his paternal grandfather (who had owned a local brewery of some wealth and fame) and his wife were Jewish. Sandgruber reports that Eduard Bloch mentioned in 1941 that Hitler had had a dispute with Hatschek at school and he had feared targeted retaliation after the Anschluss. The report, given so much weight by Cornish, of a schoolmate "Herr Keplinger" (recorded by Jetzinger after the Second World War) of Hitler once using the slur "Saujud!" during a quarrel with a boy who was shocked and unaware of his Jewish heritage until years later is much more likely to have been aimed at Hatschek than Wittgenstein. The interviewee Josef Keplinger, was a classmate of Hitler's from 1900, and from 1901 of both Hitler and Hatschek, and both Keplinger and Hatschek lived on in Linz for many years after school. But Cornish knows nothing of this or about Keplinger's other interviews about Hitler, (Note: Josef Keplinger was interviewed for the Nazi-authorised biography of Hitler credited to Heinz A. Heinz Germany's Hitler (1934) and by John Toland in the 1970s . as well as by Franz Jetzplinger in Hitler's Youth.) or his identifiable presence in the Linz class photograph. (Note: Cornish's ignorance of Hatschek and confusions about Keplinger are made further apparent in a letter he published on the website of the Holocaust-denier David Irving at the end of 1999.)

Still, as Richard J. Evans notes. Cornish argues that Wittgenstein "annoyed Hitler so much as a schoolboy that Hitler attributed his character-defects to Jews in general and tried to avenge himself by exterminating them."

As Michael Feld notes:

Cornish concludes that Hitler hated Jews because he hated Ludwig Wittgenstein. He hated Wittgenstein's family, too – his Catholic family, his assimilated family – because they tried to pass for Austrian, and because they had made themselves fabulously wealthy by establishing a steel cartel in the heart of the Habsburg empire. He hated all assimilated Jews. But at root Hitler hated Jews, Cornish tells us, because of his hatred for Ludwig Wittgenstein.

Jackie Assayag asserts that 'a single fact—that the Wittgenstein family in Vienna was never harassed by the Nazis—undermines the argument of the entire book'. Roz Kaveney also suggests that "if Hitler spent his life hating Wittgenstein, it is odd that Wittgenstein's sisters spent the entire war unmolested in Vienna". (Note: As Adam Kirsch notes, Hitler personally authorised the reclassification of the Wittgensteins as Mischlinge (half-Jewish) just a few days before the invasion of Poland. This was done, as Anthony Gottlieb puts it, "on the pretext that their paternal grandfather had been the bastard son of a German prince. Nobody believed this tale, but the arrangement enabled the German Reichsbank to claim all the gold and much of the foreign currency and stocks held in Switzerland by a Wittgenstein trust." As was noted in Slate, "If Hitler had nursed a lifelong grudge against Wittgenstein, it's doubtful such a transaction would have gone through." In interview, Cornish reports on his fruitless requests to the FBI and CIA for access to the files he thinks ought exist relating to these money transfers.)

Further, as Frank McLynn argues, "No individual, however charismatic, can energise an entire nation to endorse a purely personal grudge. There was far, far more to German anti-semitism in the 1930s than that."

In any event, that "his time at secondary school was the reason for Hitler's hostility to Jews" is a view that, as Sandgruber notes, "must be referred to the realm of inventions".

=== The Cambridge Five ===
As Nigel West notes, Cornish identifies Wittgenstein "as a central figure in the Cambridge spy ring: the talent spotter and recruiter".

McLynn reports that Cornish poses the question of why Wittgenstein, who hated academic life, returned to Trinity in 1929. His answer being that:

Wittgenstein, alarmed by the rise of the Nazis and knowing from his schooldays the manner of man the Fuhrer was, thought the way he could best serve humanity was by becoming a Soviet agent in England.

As McLynn notes, the "obvious objection is that Hitler in 1929 was nowhere near the centre of power".

Cornish presses the question of why the Soviet government offered Wittgenstein the chair in philosophy at what had been Lenin's university during the Great Purge. On this point, Cornish contends in interview that it is undeniably proven that Wittgenstein worked for the Soviets by the fact that he was offered a chair in philosophy in 1935 at Kazan, and that even if this were the only proof it would be quite sufficient.

Antony Flew agrees an explanation is needed "since Wittgenstein was very far from being a Marxist philosopher" and offers some support:

Cornish contends that the reason why ... the USSR treated Wittgenstein with such peculiar generosity was that he had been the recruiter of all the Cambridge spies. The question ... can be definitively settled only if and when the relevant Soviet archives are examined. But I am myself as confident as ... it is possible to be that Mr Cornish is right. For people who during the crucial years between Wittgenstein's return to Cambridge in 1929 and that 1935 offer were attending his classes and/or enjoying other personal contacts with him have given me accounts both of the ... overwhelming force of Wittgenstein's personality and of the absoluteness in those years of his Stalinist commitment.

Adam Shatz writes:

There is, to be sure, a simple explanation for the Russian proposal. As Monk notes, "Wittgenstein was perceived as one of the world's greatest philosophers, and it would have been a great coup for any regime to have him. The Soviet authorities probably offered him the job as a courtesy to John Maynard Keynes, who was friendly with Ivan Maiskii, the Russian ambassador." But Cornish thinks such an explanation is far too simplistic.

Further, West says, not only that there is "nothing to suggest that the Austrian refugee ever met any of his putative subordinates" but that:

The mechanics of recruitment of each of the Cambridge spies are, following the release of the KGB file in Moscow, now well established. ... So the issue of another individual, a talent spotter remotely directing operations, hardly arises.

Similarly, Paul Monk, suggests that "long-standing disputes about who really recruited Philby, Burgess, Maclean, Blunt and Cairncross" appeared to have been already settled. Like West, he also notes Cornish reached his conclusions without consulting the Soviet archives. West writes that "the KGB files tell quite a different story" but "for the committed conspiracy theorist that, too, is further proof of the plot".

Cornish also attributes Soviet victory at the Battle of Kursk to their having obtained the key to the Enigma code from Alan Turing, via Wittgenstein. Kaveney asserts that "in fact, the crucial information was given to them by John Cairncross" noting that "the Cambridge spy who arguably won the war for Russia never had anything to do with Wittgenstein". As reported in The Canberra Times, "the evidence supporting ... the supposed link between Wittgenstein and the Bletchley Park code-breakers, barely amounts even to a scrap".

Steve Clarke classifies Cornish's spymaster thesis as a conspiracy theory.

== Reception ==
Shatz remarks that "Cornish's book caused a stir in England when it was published" and that "a number of drolly dismissive commentaries ran in The Guardian, The Economist, The New Statesman, and The Times Literary Supplement" but "nobody took the book seriously". Cornish himself acknowledged in 1999, that though there had been a "couple of positive responses" to his work "Mainly ... people say it's a farrago of improbabilities, that sort of thing." (A "farrago of implausible and inaccurate theorising" is exactly how it was described by Andrew Riemer.) Some of the book's claims did however resurface in the last chapter of a 1999 book by philosopher Laurence Goldstein, if only to further criticism.

=== Laurence Goldstein ===
In his Clear and Queer Thinking (1999), Goldstein called Cornish's book important, writing: "it is overwhelmingly probable that Hitler and Wittgenstein did meet, and with dire consequences for the history of the world" though the evidence is "admittedly circumstantial".

Goldstein says that "Cornish suggests, with some plausibility, that at certain points in Mein Kampf where Hitler seems to be raging against Jews in general it is the individual young Ludwig Wittgenstein whom he has in mind" and that Wittgenstein "may have inspired ... the hatred of Jews which led, ultimately, to the Holocaust". According to Marie McGinn, this is "exactly this sort of sloppy, irresponsible, but 'plausible' style of thought that Wittgenstein's philosophy, by its careful attention to the particular and to not saying more or less than is warranted, is directed against. Goldstein's susceptibility to the charms of such obvious myths makes his hubristic claim that his 'understanding of Wittgenstein's work has improved immeasurably as a result of developing an empathy for the man' offensive as well as risible." (Note: McGinn, Marie. "Hi Ludwig!" Times Literary Supplement, no. 5069, 26 May 2000, p. 24. quoted in: Fitzgerald, Michael (2 August 2004). Autism and Creativity: Is There a Link between Autism in Men and Exceptional Ability?. Routledge. p. 308. ISBN 978-1-135-45340-4.)

Anthony Palmer notes that "while prepared to grant Ray Monk's view that there is no evidence that Wittgenstein and Hitler had anything to do with one other, this does not prevent Goldstein from speculating that they did". Palmer takes Goldstein to make 'a genuine contribution' in 'the core of the book', but considers it "a pity" that he includes such "fanciful speculations on Wittgenstein the man".

Goldstein suggests that:

After Hitler had established his programme of persecutions, one can easily imagine Wittgenstein being haunted by the thought of what difference it might have made had he taken the trouble to behave less obtrusively and obnoxiously as a schoolboy in Linz.

In response, a review in the journal Philosophy concludes:

It is all too easy to imagine all sorts of things in relation to the Third Reich. Industries are built on such imaginings. Better perhaps to stick to facts ...

Despite these and other criticisms, (Note: Pehrson insists that "history relies on the distinction between 'it might have been' and 'it was so'" and finds that "the threads are too slender, the interpretation too elaborate". Lange suggests anyone who believes that, based on the available evidence, it is undecidable what the “Objects” in Wittgenstein’s Tractatus are ought not, on the other hand, think he is obliged “in the absence of direct evidence ... to try to establish, whether some historical claim or its opposite is likely to be true”.) Goldstein remained convinced of the book's importance, writing in a 2010 review, that the author Béla Szabados "to his discredit" and "like many of Wittgenstein's admirers, entirely disregards Kimberly Cornish's controversial book" (and its "not yet conclusive evidence").

=== Others ===
David G. Stern described Cornish's "account of Wittgenstein's Jewishness as the driving force behind Hitler's anti-Semitism" as "a good example of the dangers of applying the conspiracy theory approach to Wittgenstein". Hans Sluga describes Cornish as a "gossip-writer" and says his book "constructs a completely fantastic narrative".

A leading article in The Economist remarks of Cornish's argument, "The logic is simple: if a claim has not been conclusively refuted, then that is a good reason to believe it. This principle is of little use in the natural sciences, but it works profitable wonders in the science of publishing." That, on the "slender basis" that his "family were Jewish converts to Christianity, and the young philosopher went to the same school as Adolf Hitler", Wittgenstein is deemed "unwittingly responsible for the Holocaust" is, according to an editorial in Philosophy Now, a "tasteless piece of nonsense".

Alan Bennett remarks, "it seems probable that the 'one Jewish boy' mentioned early on in Mein Kampf was, as Cornish asserts, Ludwig Wittgenstein. The trouble is Cornish makes his case in such a tendentious and overheated fashion, and utterly without humour, that he invites scepticism." Peter Bradshaw refers to the book as "far-fetched speculation" that had been "attacked by historians as fiction masquerading as history".

Jane Kramer describes The Jew of Linz as "right-wing idiocy ... a fantasy disguised as a disquisition ... which holds that Hitler murdered six million Jews because of an unfortunate brush with Ludwig Wittgenstein in a Linz Realschule". Glen Newey describes it as a "wacko book". Andreas Kapsner notes that the work "has gained infamy instead of acclaim as a historical work. ... The usually disdainful verdict of the reviewers of the book ... is based on the fact that there is precious little evidence for Cornish's claims".

=== Selected reviews ===
"The lack of any logical framework makes the work in this book insupportable. Moreover, it is erroneous to think that tenuous fragments of information taken as a sum total lead to a weighty hypothesis." writes Sophie Hampshire in Leonardo, "Cornish needs to exercise rigorous deductive analysis and to curb his imagination."

Paul Monk says: "As I read The Jew of Linz, I found myself wondering how on earth Cornish had confected so strange a piece of work. I found it by turns puzzling, funny, challenging and outrageously nutty... Cornish calls his book 'pioneer detective work', but I think it is really pioneer detective fiction."

Daniel Johnson viewed The Jew of Linz as a "revisionist tract masquerading as psycho-history". He wrote, "Cornish correctly identifies 'the twist of the investigation' as the thesis that 'Nazi metaphysics, as discernible in Hitler's writings... is nothing but Wittgenstein's theory of the mind modified so as to exclude the race of its inventor'. So the Jew of Linz was indirectly responsible, at least in part, for the Holocaust. Cornish tries to deflect the implications of his argument thus: 'Whatever 'the Jews' may have done, nothing humanly justifies what was done to them.' But he then offers 'a thought that might occur to a Hasidic Jew, and that is more fittingly a matter for Jewish, as opposed to gentile, reflection: the very engine that drove Hitler's acquisition of the magical powers that made his ascent and the Holocaust possible was the Wittgenstein Covenant violation'. At this point, the nonsensical shades into the downright sinister.

Sean French wrote in the New Statesman: "There is something heroic about this argument and it would be a good subject for a novel about the dangers of creating theories out of nothing. Vladimir Nabokov should have written it. It is not just that there are weak links in the theory. There are no links in the theory." In the same magazine Roz Kaveney calls it a "dishonest book."

Boyd Tonkin, remarks that as "a bizarre showcase of the paranoid style in history, The Jew of Linz would be hard to beat ... this sad obsessive fantasy displays the depth to which ideas about the past can sink once you dump structural causes and simply chronicle the random collisions of actors who move the world (as Hitler desired) by Will alone".

In Slate it was remarked that "Of all the blame-the-Jew hypotheses that have emerged around Hitler over the years, this one may be the most peculiarly repulsive."

== Sources ==
- Cornish, Kimberley (1998). The Jew of Linz: Wittgenstein, Hitler, and their secret battle for the mind. London: Century. ISBN 978-0-7126-7935-0.
