= Mercy Pictures =

Former art gallery in New Zealand

- Established: 2018
- Location: Auckland, New Zealand
- Founders: Teghan Burt, Jerome Ngan-Kee
- Directors: Teghan Burt, Jonny Prasad
- Website: https://www.instagram.com/mercy.pictures/

Mercy Pictures was a New Zealand art gallery that operated from 2018 to 2021 in Auckland. In 2020 it was at the centre of a nation-wide controversy over exhibiting Māori flags alongside flags of white supremacist organisations and movements.

== Early history ==
Mercy Pictures was initiated in 2018 by artists Teghan Burt and Jerome Ngan-Kee. It first opened in a small space on Karangahape Road in central Auckland. Mercy Pictures functioned as both an artist-run exhibition space and a dealer gallery, showing and selling work by individual artists and groups, as well as exhibitions authored under its own name. The gallery showed both local and international artists, such as New-York-based Amalia Ulman, who showed her first solo exhibition in New Zealand, Promise a Future, with the gallery.

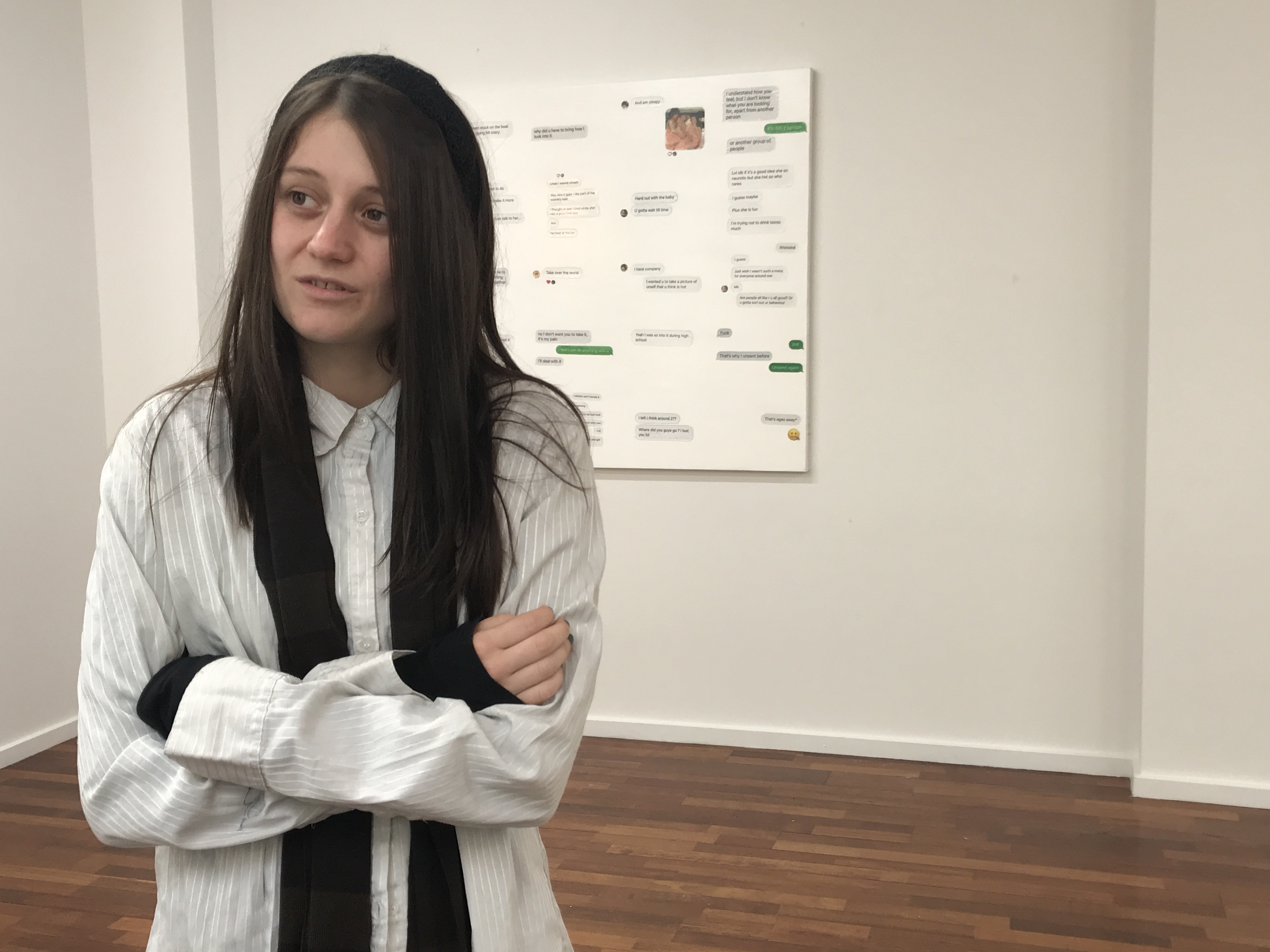
Teghan Burt at the High Street Gallery with her exhibition Touching Each Other.

In 2019 Mercy Pictures moved to a new space in High Street, opening with an exhibition featuring several American artists curated by art consultant and curator Rob McKenzie including Bernadette Van Huy, founding member of the fashion and art collective Bernadette Corporation. The exhibition was the first of a number in a programme writer Eloise Callister Baker described as being, ‘so on the pulse it can be confronting.’ That year Mercy Pictures was invited to show in the Sydney-based art fair Spring 1883 and then selected to exhibit at the Auckland Art Fair.

In 2020 Mercy Pictures opened its third and final gallery, this time on the corner of Pitt Street and Karangahape Road with Jonny Prasad as a third partner.

== People of Colour controversy ==
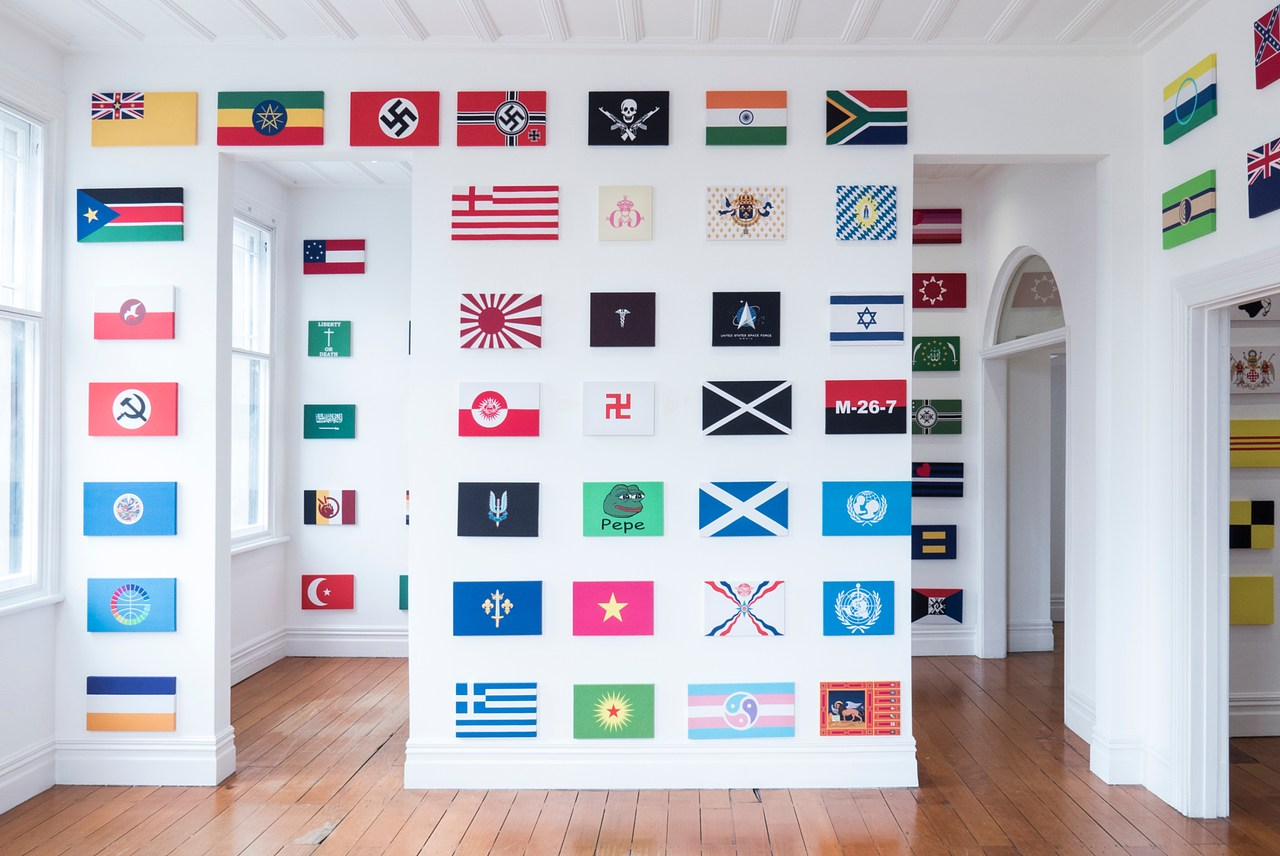
Installation of the 'People of Colour' exhibition.

On the 16th of October 2020, Mercy Pictures opened People of Colour, an exhibition authored by the gallery itself, consisting of hundreds of small flags printed in full colour on fabric and arranged in grids on the gallery walls. These ranged from national and political to ideological and even of fictional origins, such as the flags of Gondor and Mordor featured in Peter Jackson's Lord of the Rings films.

An essay by British writer and philosopher Nina Power was included as the exhibition text, though Power was not involved in creating the artworks themselves. In the essay she commented, ‘Flags have become emojis, tiny rectangular blocks next to names or pseudonyms. If we shrink the flag, do we diminish its power or expand it? People of Colour at Mercy Pictures engages in a semiotic provocation both at the level of scale and the level of meaning.'’

Near the end of the exhibition's run, two individuals wearing white face paint removed one of the flags from the wall and stole it. Some days after the exhibition closed, activist group Tamaki Anti-Fascist Action made an Instagram post labelling the exhibition 'horrific' and demanding that Mercy Pictures '1. Remove the exhibition immediately and apologise for putting it up. 2. Refuse towork with Nina Power in the future. 3. No longer platform fascist and other far-right figures and symbols in the future.'

Following this, an open letter written by Quishile Sharon, Jasmin Singh and Anevili was circulated online. The letter echoed the sentiments of the Anti-Fascist Action post, seconding the demands made and adding their own, including that Mercy Pictures 'apologise to the tribe Ngāi Tūhoe for displaying their flags without permission, without the intent of their original purpose and amongst symbols of white supremacy', that the gallery 'de-platform', and that the directors 'actively engage in accountability with the communities they have harmed...through a third-party mediation process.'

The open letter also made demands on other individuals not formally associated with Mercy Pictures, such as Auckland gallerists Michael Lett (gallery) and Tim Melville - who had posted a photo of Burt, himself and Lett attending the exhibition - insisting that they apologise for their 'platforming' of the exhibition. This led to Lett, Melville and others issuing public apologise in which they stated, among other things, that they had no association with the gallery or its directors. Around this time, the front door of the gallery was vandalised with a large spray-painted swastika.

In the wake of the open letter, a post was made on the Tāmaki Anti-Fascist Action page signed by Ngan-Kee, in which he apologised for the 'harm and re-traumatisation brought about by the exhibition' and declared his intention to 'enter face-to-face accountability processes', calling on the other directors to do the same. Several days later, a statement was released by Mercy Pictures, stating the gallery's belief in the importance of freedom of expression.

Over the following weeks, further statements denouncing the exhibition and gallery were issued by several high-profile organisations, including Auckland Pride, Auckland University of Technology, Auckland arts institution Artspace NZ, and the University of Auckland, in addition to a number of small fellow galleries and artist-run spaces. The New Zealand Jewish Council released a statement claiming that neo-Nazi imagery has a 'well-established reference that can leave people feeling vulnerable', and that 'if it is being presented as art, or as part of an exhibition, it needs to be handled sensitively and contextualised'.

Three days after the exhibition closed, the story was picked up by the New Zealand media, with articles published by the New Zealand Herald, Stuff, The Spinoff, and Radio New Zealand, including an op-ed by prominent Auckland gallerist Sarah Hopkinson, who criticised the exhibition, stating 'if art is a space of radical imagining, surely we can imagine placing reasonable limitations on the expression of toxic views.'

Support came from John Hurrell, editor and founder of EyeContact, a long-running online art review and commentary platform, who supported the idea that Mercy Pictures could be provocative and argued for their right to stand up against censorship. Following Hurrell's article, a number of writers asked for their work to be removed from EyeContact's site. Other writers made their own defences of the gallery, and criticised the negative press, including American writer and former editor of IM-1776 magazine DC Miller, in an article where he described the backlash as an example of 'a conception of art explicitly subordinated to ideological criteria. Here again one discovers the assertion that the act of exhibiting a political symbol in an art gallery equates to promoting it, as if Andy Warhol was promoting Maoism with his giant silkscreens of the Great Helmsman.' A number of group meetings on the exhibition and the ensuing fallout were held online and in person.

Mercy Pictures continued to have further exhibitions following People of Colour before finally closing its physical location at the end of 2021, although its social media page continues to operate. In 2026, Nina Power published an article revisiting the exhibition and backlash.

An archive of the gallery's exhibition history is available at Contemporary Art Library.

== Exhibition history ==
Year	Title	Artists
2018	Promise a Future	Amalia Ulman
2018	Copied Behaviour	Teghan Burt
2018	New content	Jerome Ngan-Kee
2019	Mercy Pictures and New York Artists	Rob McKenzie (curator), And1, Tahj Banks, Travis Bass, Miguel Bendaña, Robert Bittenbender, Ally Boo, Nicolas Ceccaldi, Kye Christensen-Knowles, Whitney Claflin, Devin Kyle Cuthbertson, Joseph Geagan, Zoe Kestan, Andrei Koschmieder, Matthew Longan-Peck, Danny McDonald, Alissa McKendrick, Villa Nastier, Ester Partegàs, Sam Pulitzer, Aurel Schmidt, Emily Sundblad, Bernadette Van-Huy
2019	ʎʇǝᴉɔos	Mercy Pictures
2019	The Annals of Everyday Life	Daniel Malone
2019	Our Creative Heart	Morag Neil, Georgie Nettle, Gili Tal, Lena Tutunjian
2019	Touching Each Other	Teghan Burt
2019	Mercy Pictures at Spring 1883 Art Fair	Teghan Burt, Ch'lita Collins, Jerome Ngan-Kee, Mercy Pictures
2019	All Tomorrow's Parties	Ch'lita Collins, Mercy Pictures, Josephine Pride
2019	Discourse, Identity, Sexuality	Mercy Pictures
2020	Underdeveloped and Overexposed	Teghan Burt and Ch’lita Collins
2020	People of Colour	Mercy Pictures
2021	Neverlost	Teghan Burt, Ch'lita Collins, Giovanni Intra, Daniel Malone, Ralph Paine
2021	Judah	Inspiration Group
2021	:)	Jerome Ngan-Kee
2021	Monogamy	Teghan Burt
