= Magic Farm =

American/Argentine independent film

- Release poster
- Directed by: Amalia Ulman
- Screenplay by: Amalia Ulman
- Produced by: Alex Hughes; Eugene Kotlyarenko; Riccardo Maddalosso
- Starring: Chloë Sevigny; Alex Wolff; Guillermo Jacubowicz; Joe Apollonio; Valeria Lois; Camila del Campo; Simon Rex
- Cinematography: Carlos Rigo Belliver
- Edited by: Arturo Sosa
- Music by: Burke Battelle
- Production companies: Mubi; Spacemaker Productions; Tango Entertainment; REI Cinema; Icki Eneo Arlo
- Distributed by: Mubi
- Release dates: January 28, 2025 (Sundance); April 25, 2025 (United States)
- Running time: 93 minutes
- Countries: Argentina; United States
- Languages: English; Spanish
- Box office: $93,629

Magic Farm is a 2025 absurdist comedy film written and directed by Amalia Ulman and starring Chloë Sevigny, Alex Wolff, Guillermo Jacubowicz, Joe Apollonio, Valeria Lois, Camila del Campo and Simon Rex.

The film world premiered at the 2025 Sundance Film Festival on January 28, 2025 and on February 16, 2025 at the 75th Berlin International Film Festival.

== Premise ==
Against the backdrop of an impending health crisis, a film crew lands in South America to profile a musician but discover they have arrived in the wrong country.

== Cast ==
- Alex Wolff as Jeff
- Chloë Sevigny as Edna
- Joe Apollonio as Justin
- Camila del Campo as Manchi
- Simon Rex as Dave
- Amalia Ulman as Elena
- Valeria Lois as Popa
- Guillermo Jacubowicz as Recepcionista

== Production ==
The film is written and directed by Amalia Ulman and produced by Alex Hughes, Eugene Kotlyarenko and Riccardo Maddalosso. The cast includes Chloë Sevigny and Alex Wolff as well as Joe Apollonio, Camila del Campo and Simon Rex.

Principal photography took place in Argentina. Filming was completed by August 2024.

== Release ==
It premiered at the 2025 Sundance Film Festival on January 28, 2025.

Prior to the premiere, Mubi, which produced the film, acquired distribution rights for North America, the United Kingdom, and Ireland, along with their sales company subsidiary The Match Factory handling international sales for the film. The film was released in the United States on April 25, 2025.

== Reception ==
On the review aggregator website Rotten Tomatoes, 43% of 30 critics' reviews are positive, with an average rating of 5.3/10. Metacritic, which uses a weighted average, assigned the film a score of 59 out of 100, based on 13 critics, indicating "mixed or average" reviews.

Reviewing for Variety, Carlos Aguilar described the film as "a formally radical, biting satire about odious, privileged Americans adrift in a remote Argentine rural town", pointing out that it "operates with refreshing visual anarchy".
