= Andrea Escobar =

Colombian actress, television hostess, and model (born 1993)

- Born: Andrea Escobar Duque; July 21, 1988 (age 38); Valle del Cauca, Colombia
- Occupations: Actress, model, television host
- Years active: 2003–present
- Height: 1.79 m (5 ft 10 in)

Andrea Marcela Escobar Duque (born July 22, 1988) is a Colombian actress, television hostess, and model.

Escobar is the oldest of two. Her brother one year younger is a chef, native of San Juan Bautista de Guacari.

== Modelling career ==
Escobar won the Elite Model Look Colombia 2003 and placed number 16 out of more than 100 contestants in the finals of Elite model look held in Singapore. She then signed a contract with Stock Models in Bogota. A year later Escobar was scouted by the agency Michelle Pommier and moved to Miami. Later that year she changed her agency to Joy Front Management.

Her list of clients includes an exclusive show of Roberto Cavalli's birthday party as her first job in the USA. She has worked with major designers like Agata Ruiz De La Prada, Adolfo Dominguez, Custo Barcelona, Marck Jacobs, Bvlgary, Cartier, American Eagle, Rosa Cha, La Martina, MAC cosmetics, Diesel, Cosmopolitan Magazine, Avanti, South Pole, Gab, Tommy Hilfiger, Sauvage, Beats by Dr Dre, Gottex, Steve Madden, Federciks of Hollywood, YSL, and Victoria's Secret.

Escobar has participated in music videos with artists like Luis Fonsi, Romeo Santos, Ludacris, Pharrell Williams, Lil Wayne, Wycleft, T.I, Timbaland, Pitbull, and David Guetta.

She also was the cover of Diners magazine in August 2004, the cover of Vitalika for the month of July in 2009, and Revista Don Juan had her as the cover of the month of August in 2013. She has appeared on the pages of Infashion (Colombia), Fuscia (Colombia), Caras (Colombia), Novias (Colombia), Revista TV & Novelas (Colombia), Miss & Bliss (Brazil), Eres (Mexico), & (Miami), Ocean drive (Miami), Dmag (Argentina), Venue magazine (Miami), Esquire Latin America (South and Central America), Esquire magazine (Colombia) among others around the globe.

Escobar is also active in helping others. In 2004, she was part of a campaign named "Cartagena look 2004" to raise money for getting help for those affected by the rain in Colombia. She collaborated with Amigos For Kids and Little Lighthouse Foundation.

=== Awards ===
- Winner of Elite Model Look Colombia 2003.
- Modelo Revelacion (Revelation) of the Caliexposhow in 2004.
- TV host of fashion TV CaliExposhow 2004
- Modelo TV & Novelas, 2004
- TV host for Fashion TV Mercedez Benz fashion week 2005, Mexico.
- Winner of Miss Beauty of the world Colombia pageant 2010, Colombia.
- Winner of Miss Beauty of South America, Miss Beauty of the World Pageant 2010, held in China.
- Voted one of the most beautiful women for People in Spanish.

== Acting credits ==
Escobar made her debut as an actress in Colombia in Pasion de Gavilanes in 2003. She has acted in a couple of episodes of Burn Notice, CSI Miami and CSI LA. Film in Miami between 2005 and 2008 Escobar had a recurrent role in the popular TV series Aurora (telenovela) from 2010 to 2011. She also did a small part on the movie Rock of Ages with Tom Cruise and Catherine Zeta-Jones in 2012. Later Escobar had a guest role in La Gata (telenovela) in 2014 She played Brea in Ballers, an HBO series in 2015.

Escobar has studied acting in her country with Alfonso Ortiz, Vicky Hernandez, Sergio Cabrera and his wife Florina Lemetre. Once in Miami she prepared with Sebastian Ligarde, Roberto Huicochea, Adela Romero. She studied acting at the New York film academy.

- 2010: Aurora, TV Series (as Julia Castillo)
- 2015: Ballers, TV Series (as Brea)
- 2017: Metro, TV Series (as Pamela)
- 2021: El Planeta, Movie (as Waitress)

== Sources ==
- Aurora at Internet Movie Database
- Miss Beauty of the World Pageant
- August 2013 Cover
- Victoria's secret
- Modelo revelacion, Caliexposhow 2004
- Angel colombiano de Victoria's Secret
- 'Elite Model Look, Singapour'
- 'Cartagena look 2004'
