= Amalia Ulman =

Argentinian-born Spanish artist and filmmaker

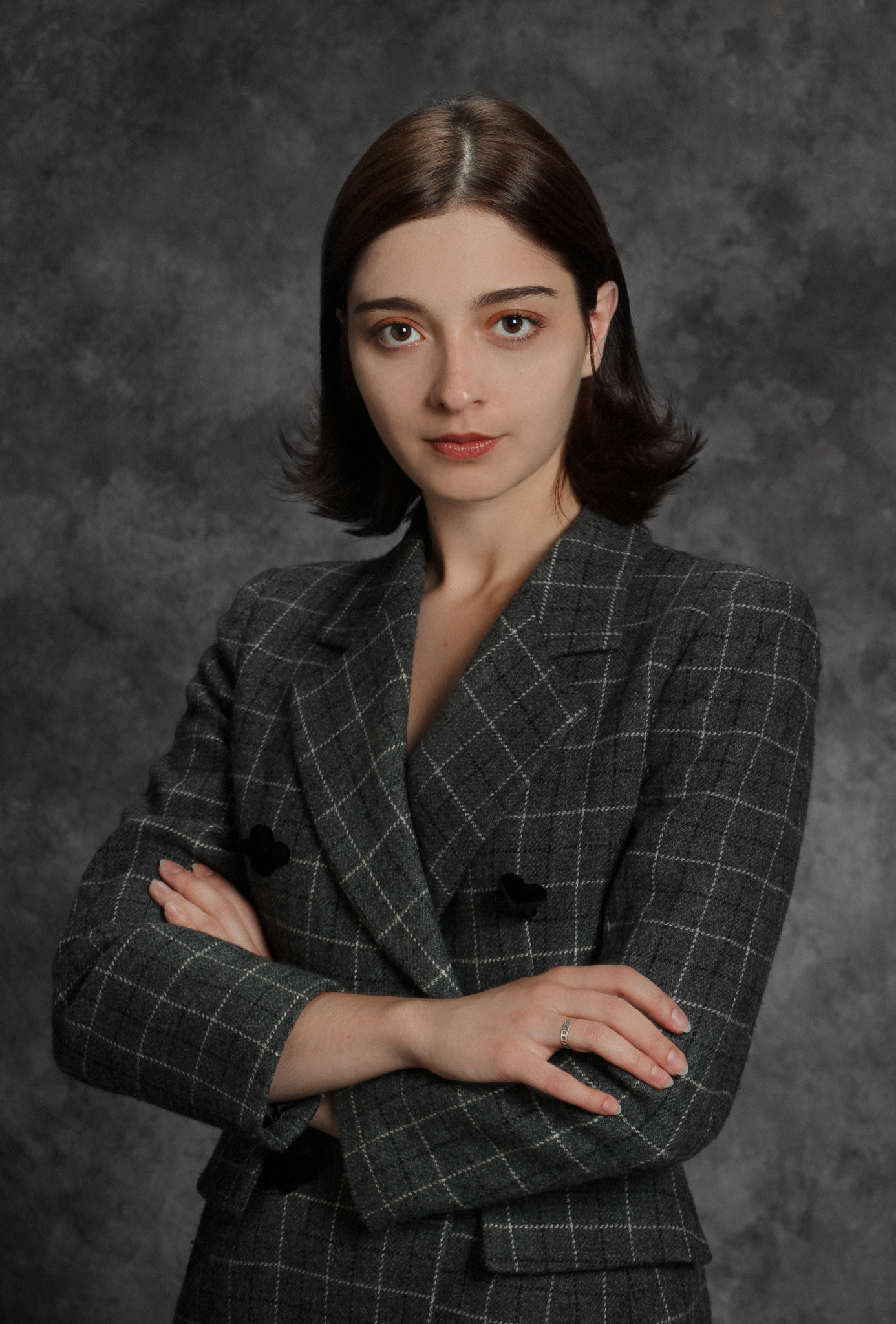
- Ulman in 2016
- Born: 1989 (age 36–37); Buenos Aires, Argentina
- Citizenship: Argentina; Spain
- Education: Central Saint Martins
- Occupation: Multidisciplinary artist
- Years active: 2012–present

Amalia Ulman (born 1989) is an Argentine-Spanish artist and film director whose practice includes performance, installation, video and net-art works. Her work deals with issues of class, gender, sexuality, and middlebrow aesthetics. In 2021, Ulman made her feature film debut, with El Planeta.

== Early life ==
Ulman was born in Argentina in 1989 and was raised in Gijón, in the Spanish province of Asturias, after emigrating with her family.

In 2009, she left Spain to study at Central Saint Martins in London, where she graduated in 2011. In 2013, she was in a serious Greyhound bus accident that left her with a permanent disability.

== Career ==
In April 2013, Ulman presented a video essay Buyer, Walker, Rover as a Skype lecture at the Regional State Archives in Gothenburg.

In 2014, she presented two solo shows in Los Angeles, Used & New at ltd Los Angeles and Delicious Works at Smart Objects, also in LA.

The same year Ulman started Excellences & Perfections, a four-month performance on her Instagram account where she fabricated fictional characters whose story unfolded in three different episodes. Her intention was to prove how easy an audience can be manipulated through the use of mainstream archetypes. (Note: The narrative which unfolded over the course of the performance "Excellences & Perfections" was presented as follows: "The provincial girl moves to the big city, wants to be a model, wants money, splits up with her high-school boyfriend, wants to change her lifestyle, enjoys singledom, runs out of money because she doesn't have a job, because she is too self-absorbed in her narcissism, she starts going on seeking-arrangement dates, gets a sugar daddy, gets depressed, starts doing more drugs, gets a boob job because her sugar daddy makes her feel insecure about her body, and also he pays for it, she goes through a breakdown, redemption takes place, the crazy bitch apologizes, the dumb blonde turns brunette and goes back home. Probably goes to rehab, then she is grounded at her family house.") Instagram selfies were mainly taken sneaking into hotels and restaurants in Los Angeles and posted as if they were documenting a real life. It is a work that shifts the location of performance art and also extends ideas about feminist performance. Excellences and Perfections was later chosen to be a part of the Electronic Superhighway Exhibition at Whitechapel Gallery in 2016.

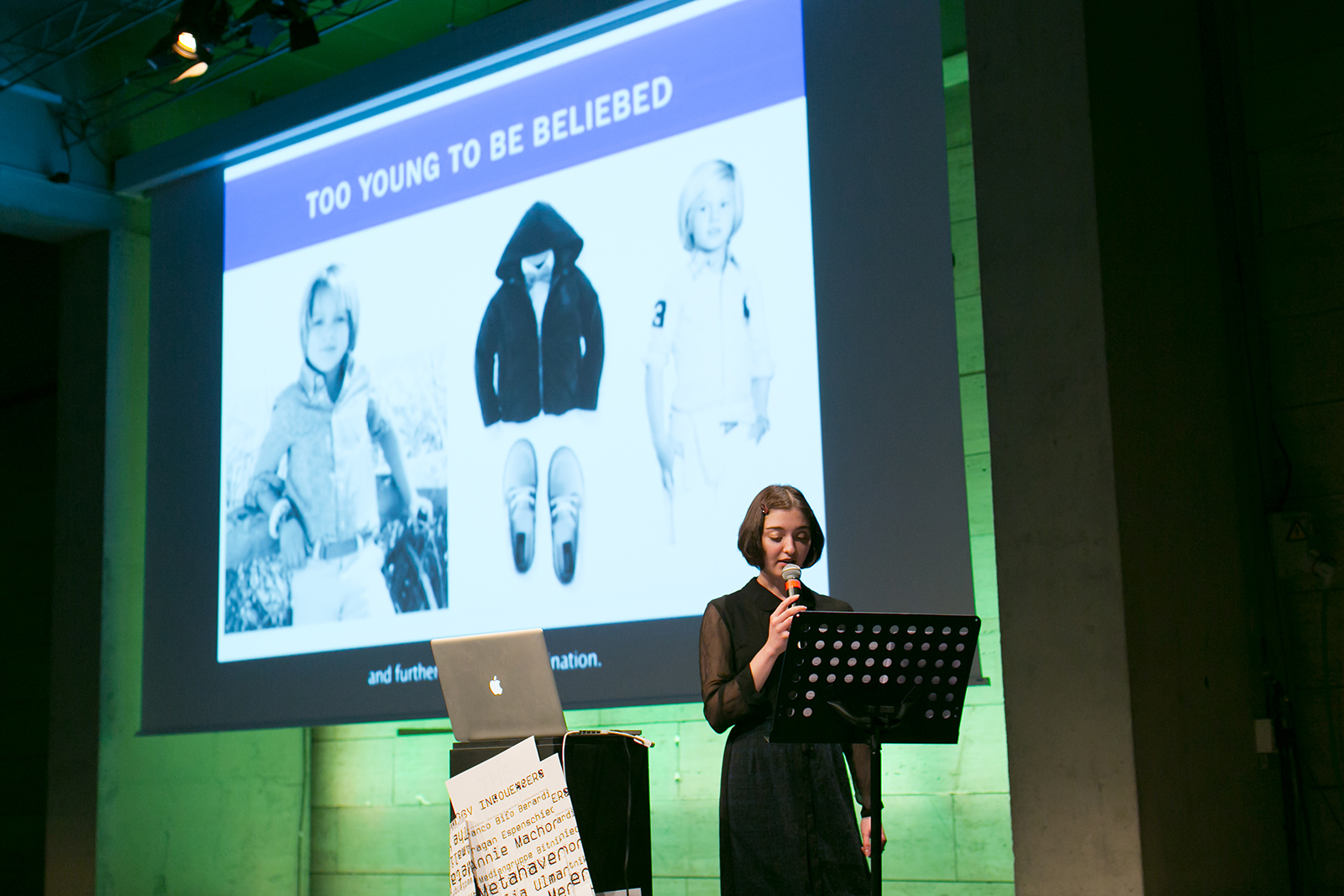
Ulman at The Inluencers in 2015

In October 2014, during Frieze Art Fair, Ulman presented a solo show The Destruction of Experience at Evelyn Yard in London. For the show Ulman made "The Future Ahead", a video essay about Justin Bieber's "growth from angelic teenager to hetero-normative white male".

In January 2015, she presented Stock Images of War, her first solo show in New York City at James Fuentes Gallery. It is an immersive installation composed of twelve simple wire-frame sculptures, each one being named after a different month of the year – i.e. "War in January", "War in February", etc. Towards the end of the same year, Ulman started Privilege, a second, year long, Instagram performance that lasted until shortly after the 2016 U.S. presidential election. The work presented an exaggerated version of Ulman that explored multiplicity in a corporate office setting.

In 2016 Excellences and Perfections was selected to be included in the group exhibition Performing for the Camera at Tate Modern, London (February—June 2016). The exhibition, examined the relationship between photography and performance, brought together over 500 works spanning 150 years from the invention of photography to the selfie-culture of today. Through Ulman's Instagram-based project, social media was examined in the historical context of photographic performances. The installation was also part of the exhibition Electronic Highway at Whitechapel Gallery in London. Ulman has been described as the first social network-based artist to enter top institutional galleries, and the "First great Instagram Artist" by Elle magazine.

In 2018, Excellences & Perfections was published as a book by Prestel. It includes the Instagram posts that she used for the project and essays by German artist Hito Steyerl, editor Rob Horning and others. The same year Ulman would be the opening exhibition of Mercy Pictures, a small artist run gallery in New Zealand with a new version of her exhibition Promise a Future.

=== Film ===
In 2021, Ulman premiered her first feature film, El Planeta, at the Sundance Film Festival to critical acclaim. Ulman wrote, produced, and directed the feature, which stars herself and her mother. An absurdist comedy, the film centers on the story of a mother and daughter facing eviction in post-crisis Spain and scamming their way to a more comfortable lifestyle. The film is loosely based on the real-life Spanish mother-daughter petty-crime duo Justina and Ana Belén. The film was shot in black and white in Gijon, the Spanish town where Ulman grew up. In March 2021, film distribution company Utopia announced that it had bought the North American rights to El Planeta. The film was selected for screening at the Brisbane International Film Festival and the Sydney Film Festival in October and November 2021 respectively.

Ulman's next film, Magic Farm, dealt with a US-based documentary film crew working in northern Argentina, where the film was shot and she was born.

== Personal life ==
As of 2021, Ulman lives with her husband in New York City. Ulman is autistic.

== Solo exhibitions ==
=== 2012 ===
- Savings & Shelves, Headquarters, Zurich
- Overcome, cleanse, Galeria Adriana Suarez, Gijon

=== 2013 ===
- Promise a Future, Marbriers 4, Geneva
- Moist Forever, Future Gallery, Berlin
- Ethira, Arcadia Missa, London

=== 2014 ===
- Used & New, Ltd, Los Angeles
- Delicious Works, Smart Objects, Los Angeles
- Babyfootprints Crow's Feet, Ellis King, Dublin
- The Destruction of Experience, Evelyn Yard Gallery, London

=== 2015 ===
- Stock Images of War, James Fuentes Gallery, New York City
- International House Of Cozy, Showroom MAMA, Rotterdam

=== 2016 ===
- Reputation, New Galerie, Paris
- Labour Dance, Arcadia Missa, London

=== 2017 ===
- Dignity, James Fuentes Gallery, New York City
- Intolerance, Barro, Buenos Aires
- Monday Cartoons, Deborah Schamoni, Munich
- Atchoum!, Galerie Sympa, Figeac
- New World 1717, Rockbund Art Museum, Shanghai

=== 2018 ===
- Privilege, James Fuentes Gallery, New York City

== See also ==
- Aliza Shvarts
- Post-Internet art
