= El Planeta (film) =

2021 comedy film

- Poster
- Directed by: Amalia Ulman
- Written by: Amalia Ulman
- Produced by: Amalia Ulman; Kathleen Heffernan; Kweku Mandela
- Starring: Amalia Ulman; Ale Ulman; Nacho Vigalondo; Zhou Chen; Saoirse Bertram
- Cinematography: Carlos Rigo Bellver
- Edited by: Katharine McQuerrey; Anthony Valdez
- Production company: Holga's Meow Pictures
- Distributed by: Utopia
- Release date: January 30, 2021 (Sundance)
- Running time: 79 minutes
- Countries: United States; Spain
- Languages: Spanish; English

El Planeta is a 2021 absurdist comedy film directed and written by Amalia Ulman. The film stars Amalia Ulman, Ale Ulman (Amalia's real-life mother), Nacho Vigalondo, Zhou Chen and Saoirse Bertram.

The film had its world premiere at the 2021 Sundance Film Festival on January 30, 2021.

== Plot ==
An absurdist comedy, the film centers on the story of a mother and daughter facing eviction in post-crisis Spain and scamming their way to a more comfortable lifestyle. The film is loosely based on the real-life Spanish mother-daughter petty-crime duo Justina and Ana Belén.

== Cast ==
The cast includes:

- Amalia Ulman as Leonor Jimenez
- Ale Ulman as María Rendueles
- Nacho Vigalondo as Older Man
- Zhou Chen as Younger Man
- Saoirse Bertram as Fashion Editor
- Andrea Escobar as Waitress
- Carlos Carbonell as Supermarket Cashier
- Zhou Chen as Younger Man

== Production ==
Ulman wrote, produced, and directed the feature, which stars herself and her mother in the latter's debut performance on the silver screen. The film was shot in black and white in Gijón, the Spanish town where Ulman grew up.

== Release ==
The film had its premiere in the 2021 Sundance Film Festival on January 30, 2021, in the World Cinema Dramatic Competition section.

On March 17, 2021, Utopia acquired the US distribution rights to the film. On July 16, 2021, Static Vision announced their acquisition of the Australian and New Zealand rights to the film.

The film was selected for screening at the Brisbane International Film Festival and the Sydney Film Festival in October and November 2021 respectively. The film was also selected to screen at the 2021 edition of the Melbourne International Film Festival, before the in-person element of the festival was cancelled.

== Reception ==
As of May 2022 review aggregator website Rotten Tomatoes surveyed 41 critics and, categorizing the reviews as positive or negative, assessed 39 as positive and 2 as negative for a 95% rating. Among the reviews, it determined an average rating of 7.5 out of 10.

It won critical acclaim at its Sundance screening.

== Accolades ==
El Planeta has been nominated for and won a number of awards. Wins have included:

- Buenos Aires International Festival of Independent Cinema: Best Director, FEISAL Award
- Galway Film Fleadh: Peripheral Visions Award
- Jerusalem Film Festival: Best International Debut
- Oak Cliff Film Festival: Best Narrative Feature
- Toulouse Cinespaña: Winner, Best Screenplay
