= What Do Men Want? (book) =

2023 book by Nina Power

What Do Men Want: Masculinity and its Discontents
- Author: Nina Power
- Publication date: 2022
- ISBN: 978-0-241-35650-0

What Do Men Want? is a book by British philosopher Nina Power. Power argues for a need for reconciliation of sexes after a claimed period of demonization of men. Power argues for an understanding of historic features of relations between sexes and historic values and virtues to live better together and that there are some biological components to behavioural differences between men and women. Power reviews online men's issues groups, collectively referred to as the Manosphere, which Power argues should be understood.

== Reception ==
Houman Barekat, reviewing in The Guardian, argues the demonisation of men is exaggerated as part of a culture war and that, while there may be pockets of misandry, it is not widespread. Reviewing in The Observer, Tim Adams says that the book is provocative and rigorous. Reviewing in The Telegraph, Tim Stanley says that Power deserves credit for trying to understand Manosphere groups. In The Times, Louise Perry, calls the book bracingly original. According to a review by Patricia Patnode it "is a lovely exploration of our present gender division." The Critic also provides a positive view of Power's venture to reconcile the sexes, "Power is crafting a peace treaty between the sexes and putting forward new terms for negotiation."
