= One Dimensional Woman =

2009 book by Nina Power

- Author: Nina Power
- Language: English
- Publisher: Zero Books
- Publication date: 2009
- Publication place: United Kingdom
- Pages: 74
- ISBN: 978-1-84694-241-9

One Dimensional Woman is a 2009 book by British writer and philosopher Nina Power. Published by Zero Books, the book is an anti-capitalist, feminist text.
