= Marie McGinn =

British philosopher

Marie McGinn (born 1951) is a British philosopher working in philosophy of mind and Wittgenstein. McGinn is an emeritus professor of philosophy at the University of York.

== Biography ==
Marie McGinn holds a bachelor's degree from the University of Manchester and a BPhil and DPhil from University of Oxford, and taught at Oxford, the University of Wisconsin in Madison and University of York. In 2011 she was appointed president of the Aristotelian Society.

== Publications ==
- The Routledge Guidebook to Wittgenstein's Philosophical Investigations (The Routledge Guides to the Great Books), (Routledge, 2013)
- Elucidating the Tractatus: Wittgenstein's Early Philosophy of Logic and Language (Oxford University Press, 2009)
- "The Writer and Society: An Interpretation of Nausea", British Journal of Aesthetics 37 (1997), pp. 118–28.
- "Wittgenstein's Remarks On Colour", Philosophy, Volume 66 (1991), Issue 258, pp. 435–453
