= Nina Power =

British philosopher

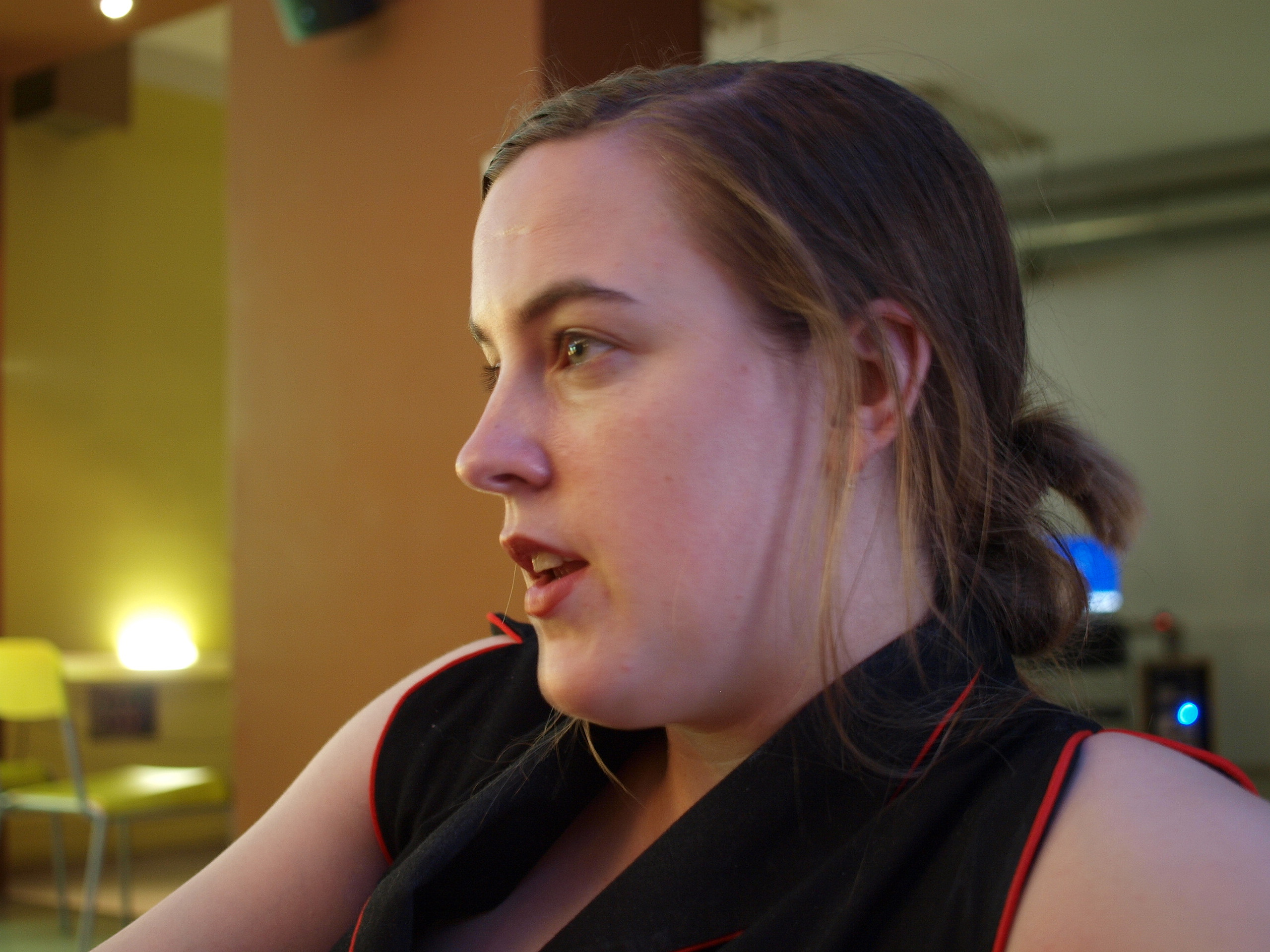
- Power in 2009
- Born: 1978 (age 47–48)
- Education: University of Warwick; Middlesex University
- Notable work: One Dimensional Woman; What Do Men Want?
- Website: ninapower.net

Nina Power (born 1978) is an English writer and philosopher, author of three books.

== Biography ==
Born in 1978, Power lived as a child in rural Wiltshire.

Power attended the University of Warwick, where she received a BA and MA in philosophy, and completed her doctorate in philosophy at Middlesex University.

Power spent a decade in academia, rising to senior lecturer in philosophy at the University of Roehampton.

With Alberto Toscano, Power is both editor and translator of Alain Badiou's 2003 book On Beckett.

Her book One Dimensional Woman was published in 2009. Academic Elena Marchevska said that the book "questioned ... the purpose and economics of feminism today." The Guardian's reviewer said "[Power] casts her critical eye across an impressive range of subjects, from Sarah Palin to pornography, war and how society structures both home and work. ... I salute this book: because it makes you think." Power argued that in a contemporary environment in which "the blurring of work, social, personal and physical life is almost total," feminism must "recognize the new ways in which life and existence are colonized by new forms of domination that go far beyond objectification as it used to be understood."

In 2019, Power and writer Daniel Miller sued artist Luke Turner for defamation over a series of tweets by Turner. Power and Miller argued the tweets suggested they were both antisemitic. Almost £30,000 was raised through a crowdfunder to support Power and Miller's legal action, titled "Targeted, harassed and falsely labelled a fascist". Turner countersued for harassment. The judge dismissed the claims of both parties in November 2023. The judge ordered Power and Miller to pay 80% of Turner's court costs, which ran into six figures. Turner was then able to have Power and Miller declared bankrupt involuntarily the following year. Crypto billionaire Ben Delo loaned Power £350,000 to support her legal case, secured against Power's flat.

In 2020 Power wrote an essay for an exhibition 'People of Colour' at Mercy Pictures, a small artist-run gallery in New Zealand, and was drawn into a controversy over the display of Māori flags being hung alongside symbols of white supremacy like the Nazi flag.

Power published What Do Men Want? in 2021. In The Times, Louise Perry called the book "bracingly original" with a "refreshingly sympathetic view of men and masculinity." Writing in The Guardian, Houman Barekat said that "Power’s ostensibly reasonable call for compassion feels at best platitudinous, at worst disingenuous or even reactionary" when "set against her caricaturing of bien-pensant liberalism."

Power was a senior editor of and columnist for the online magazine Compact until her resignation in July 2024.

== Political views ==
In May 2023, Power spoke at the National Conservatism Conference in London on the topic "After the Individual." Writer Dan Hitchens reported that she "bluntly urged [her] audience to just go to church."

Some of her works have argued for a "return to old values and virtues", especially as a response to a claimed masculinity crisis. In 2024, she published an article in Compact criticizing gender-affirming care and dismissing it as a "fad." Her views have been described as transphobic and aligned with the gender critical movement.

== Books ==
- Power, Nina (2009). One Dimensional Woman. John Hunt Publishing. ISBN 978-1-78099-737-7.
- Power, Nina (2020). Platforms. Morbid Books. ISBN 978-1-9162640-2-1.
- Power, Nina (2022). What Do Men Want?: Masculinity and Its Discontents. Penguin UK. ISBN 978-0-241-35651-7.

== Film appearances ==
- Marx Reloaded, ZDF/Arte, April 2011.
