= Films Noirs =

British Film Production Company

Films Noirs is a British film and television production company specializing in animation.

== Information ==
Films Noirs was established in the year of 2002. This company is known for concentrating in the areas of animation, 3D visual effects and digital compositing. They do work with third parties and their commissions. The team has the ability to work independently or in partnership. Co-founded by the British theorist Jason Barker, the company co-produced the documentary film Marx Reloaded, which was broadcast on Arte on 11 April 2011. Marx Reloaded is one of their recent films, and it premiered at Miller Theater in New York at about 325 registered, and 200 showed up at the event.

== News ==
Films Noirs is currently working on a feature-length animated film entitled Marx Returns, although the release date is unknown.

== Films ==
- Marx Reloaded (in co-production with Medea Film - Irene Höfer for ZDF). Written and directed by Jason Barker.
- Marx Returns (in production)
