= Michael Blum (artist) =

Israeli visual artist

Michael Blum (Hebrew: מיכאל בלום; born 1966 in Jerusalem) is an artist using a variety of media, ranging from photography and video to books, installations, objects, text, printed matter.

He studied history at Paris University, photography at Ecole Nationale de la Photographie, Arles, France, and later spent 2 years at Rijksakademie in Amsterdam. He's been developing works that aim at critically re-reading the production of culture and history. His work has been shown at numerous venues including the Centre Georges-Pompidou (Paris), the New Museum (New York), Transmediale (Berlin), Kunsthalle Vienna, the San Francisco Art Institute, the Baltic, Istanbul, Torino and Tirana Biennials.

== The 1990s ==
Initially and under influence of the OuLiPo, his interest focused on language and classification systems : Choses à récupérer chez Milena à l’exception des meubles, de l’aspirateur et des rideaux, qui seront repris lors d’un déménagement ultérieur (1992), Blum's first video, is an exhaustion of all possible relations between word and object, after a found list of objects written by an unknown manic person.

C’est la vie (1996), a series of poetic obituaries based on French fin-de-siecle journalist and anarchist Felix Feneon, and recorded on almost extinct Super-8 stock, is both hilarious and tragic.

The Network (1994–97) was an attempt at connecting language, as a network of signs, to the whole of urban networks. It took shape as 78 interventions in public spaces throughout France, Germany and the UK. This unpublished work marked the last of Blum's works to use the alphabet as structure and constraint.

== Video travelogues ==
In the following years, Blum confronted his knowledge with personal situations in a global context, which resulted in the production of several travelogues. Wandering Marxwards (1998) was produced during the Long March. Trot, Trot, Mao, Meow residency at the Banff Center for the Arts, Banff, Canada. The project followed Einsenstein's failure to film Marx's Capital and considered the relevance of a re-reading of Marx 150 years after the Communist Manifesto had been written.

In The Language Course (2000), a collaboration with Carlos Amorales and NGO El Caracol in Mexico City, Blum learnt Spanish from former street kids they were working with.

In My Sneakers (2001), Blum embarked on a journey to Indonesia to find out where his Nike sneakers came from. This project was produced in collaboration with Jakarta-based artists collective ruangrupa.

17 Aandbloem Street (2003) is a portrait of post -Apartheid South Africa, centered around a singular house in Cape Town, 10 years after the fall of the apartheid regime.

The Three Failures (2006), a sequel to Wandering Marxwards, was shot in three cities embodying the failure of the three major political ideologies of the 20th century (the past failure of communism in Riga, the current failure of social-democracy in Malmö, the upcoming failure of capitalism in New York). It features Blum dressed up as a whimsical explorer, half-boss and half-worker.

Ciao Ghatoul (2007) is a tongue-in-cheek video documenting a day in the life of an Israeli man who, upset with the constant meows of a neighbouring cat, decides to abduct it and deport it to the West Bank, beyond the «separation wall», a journey made difficult because of the Israeli occupation.

In 2010, he collaborated with Bosnian artist Damir Niksic on a touching tribute to slapstick silent film (and to the 1984 Sarajevo Olympics!): "Oriental Dream".

The Psychics series should also be mentioned. In an attempt at collecting information "beyond the limitations of rational discourse", he hires a psychic to come over to his place and read the space. He videotapes the reading in one single shot. Completely experimental by nature, these videos range from amazing to boring, depending on the style, acting and charisma of the psychic. There are 8 chapters so far since 2003: Cape Town (private residence), Chicago (Austrian studio), Malmoe (Rooseum center for contemporary art), Amsterdam (De Appel center for contemporary art), New York (private residence), Vienna (private residence), Rotterdam (Fotomuseum) and New York (Sculpture Center).

== Research-based projects ==
Parallel to the video works, he developed other projects, dealing with cultural memory, the re-interpretation of history, and engaging more critically with research. 400 Years Without A Grave Is A Long Time To Shut Up (commission by Amsterdams Fonds voor de kunst in 2002) consisted in providing Cornelius de Houtman, the Dutch 'discoverer' of Indonesia, with the grave he had been waiting for since 400 years, thus illuminating Holland's ambiguity towards its colonial past.

The Monument to the Birth of the 20th Century (OK Centrum Linz, 2004, published as a book in 2005 By Revolver) was a political speculation based on the common schooling of Hitler and Wittgenstein, steps away from the inviting art center.

At the 9th Istanbul biennial (2005), Blum presented A Tribute to Safiye Behar, a museum dedicated to a controversial lover of Mustafa Kemal Atatürk, raising questions and eyebrows.

In 2006, Blum conducted another historical investigation on sensitive terrain: Lippmann, Rosenthal & Co (De Appel, Amsterdam, 2006) was the name of the Jewish bank established from 1859 to 1968 in what is now the De Appel art center building, and which stood at the center of the Nazi looting machine during WWII and the occupation of the Netherlands.

Cape Town - Stockholm (On Thembo Mjobo) (Mobile Art Production, Stockholm, 2007) is a book and radio-piece exploring the Swedish support to Southern Africa's liberation movements from the 1960s to the 1990s, which has more or less vanished from Swedish collective memory.

Exodus 2048, presented in 2008 at the Van Abbemuseum in Eindhoven (Becoming Dutch) and in 2009 at the New Museum in New York, was a staged camp for Israeli refugees after they will be expelled in 2048.

== Publications ==
He also publishes books :

- La salle des temps perdus, Le Grand Wazoo, Amiens, 1997.
- Homo Œconomicus. Amsterdam, IDEA Books, 2000
- potlach.doc. Amsterdam, RABK, 2002
- Monument to the Birth of the 20th Century. Frankfurt am Main, Revolver Verlag, 2005
- La Dernière Brève, Centre d'art la synagogue de Delme & Revolver Verlag, 2005
- Cape Town-Stockholm. On Thembo Mjob. Lund, Sweden, Propexus, 2007
- (in German) Mein Land. Ein Künstlerbuch zur europäischen Abschiebepraxis.. Unrast, Münster 2008
- Notre histoire | Our History. Montreal, Galerie de l'UQAM, 2014
- (in German) Oranienstraße. Ausgrabungen. Eine Vers-Chronik. Klak Verlag, Berlin 2019 Ici. (See below)
- (in French) "Domaine Lilium" Héliotrope, Montréal, 2023

He was featured in CREAM 3. London, Phaidon Press, 2003

== See also ==
- Goethe Institute, Montréal: (In German, English, French): Buchpräsentation und Gespräch "A Man Digging - Un homme qui creuse - Oranienstraße, Ausgrabungen. Presentation Sonja Finck, Gatineau. February 2, 2020 Events
- The Jew of Linz - a book by Kimberley Cornish on which the piece The Monument to the Birth of the 20th Century investigates.
