= Alberto Toscano =

Italian scholar and translator

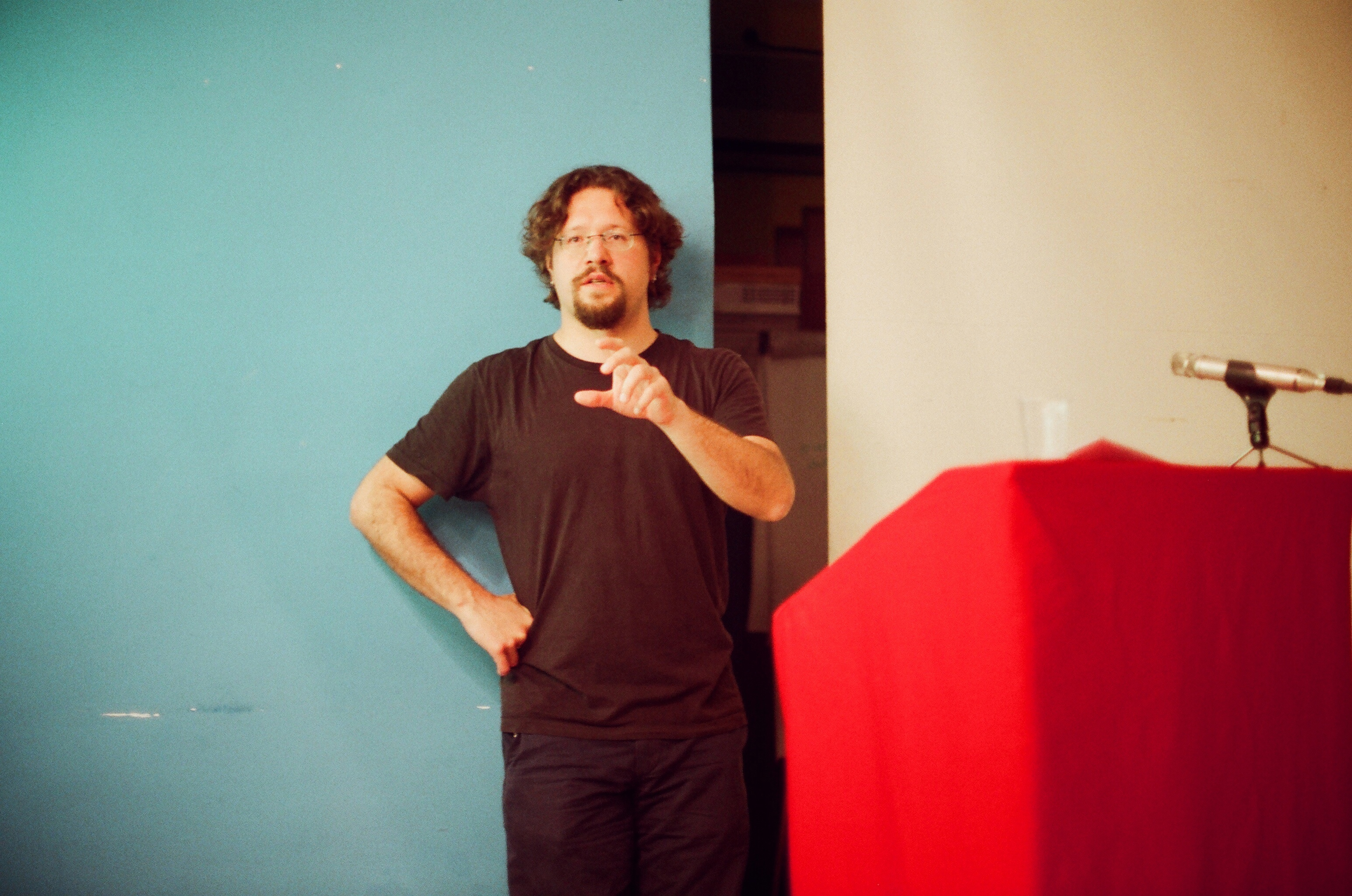
- Born: 1 January 1977 (age 49); Moscow, Russian SFSR, USSR

Philosophical work
- Era: Contemporary philosophy
- Region: Western philosophy
- School: Western Marxism
- Main interests: Cultural criticism

Alberto Toscano (born 1 January 1977) is an Italian cultural critic, social theorist, philosopher, and translator. He has translated the work of Alain Badiou, including Badiou's The Century and Logics of Worlds. He served as both editor and translator of Badiou's Theoretical Writings and On Beckett.

== Work ==
Toscano was born in Moscow, Russian SFSR, USSR, on 1 January 1977. He studied philosophy at the Eugene Lang College, New School for Social Research, where he received his BA Liberal Arts in 1997. He received his MA in Continental Philosophy at the University College Dublin in 1999. He then went on to pursue a PhD in philosophy at the University of Warwick, which he completed in 2003.

Toscano works across critical social theory and philosophy. His current research is divided into three main strands:

- a theoretical and historical inquiry into the politics of authoritarianism and their links to the racial, geopolitical and gendered crises of capital, set out in his recent book Late Fascism: Race, Capitalism and the Politics of Crisis;
- the study of tragedy as a framework through which to understand collective politics and its discontents, from decolonisation to climate action;
- the development of ‘real abstraction’ as a heuristic for the analysis contemporary capitalism, notably in its nexus with processes of racialization, automation and digitalization.

His work has been described both as an investigation of the persistence of the idea of communism in contemporary thought and a genealogical inquiry into the concept of fanaticism. He is the author of The Theatre of Production (2006), and his book Fanaticism: On the Uses of an Idea was published in 2010. Toscano has published on contemporary philosophy, politics and social theory. In an article on the Tarnac 9 case, written for The Guardian in December 2009, Toscano argues that society is losing its ability to distinguish between vandalism and terrorism.

Formerly Reader in Sociology at Goldsmiths, University of London, Toscano is currently Adjunct Professor at the School of Communication, Simon Fraser University. He is a member of the editorial board of the journal Historical Materialism: Research in Critical Marxist Theory. According to Alex Callinicos this journal "has been one of the main drivers of the academic revival of Marxism" since the mid-1990s. Toscano is also the series editor of The Italian List for Seagull Books.

== Selected bibliography ==
Translated books

- Alain Badiou, Logics of Worlds, London: Continuum, 2009.
- Alain Badiou, The Century, London: Polity, 2007.
- (with M. Mandarini) Antonio Negri, Political Descartes: Reason, Ideology and the Bourgeois Project, London: Verso, 2007.
- Alain Badiou, Handbook of Inaesthetics, Stanford: Stanford University Press, 2004.
- (with Ray Brassier) Alain Badiou, Theoretical Writings, London: Continuum, 2004.
- (with E.R. Albert), Éric Alliez, The Signature of the World, Or, What is Deleuze and Guattari's Philosophy?, London: Continuum, 2004.
- (with Nina Power) Alain Badiou, On Beckett, London: Clinamen Press, 2003.
- (with Benjamin Noys) Georges Bataille, Critical Essays. London and Calcutta: Seagull, 2023.

Edited books

- (with an introduction by Brenna Bhandar and Alberto Toscano) Ruth Wilson Gilmore, Abolition Geography: Essays in Liberation. London and New York: Verso, 2022.

Authored books

- The Theatre of Production: Philosophy and Individuation between Kant and Deleuze. Basingstoke: Palgrave, 2006.
- Fanaticism: On the Uses of an Idea. New York: Verso, 2010; 2017, 2nd ed..
  - Le Fanatisme. Modes d'emploi. La fabrique, 2011 (FR).
- Cartographies of the Absolute (with Jeff Kinkle). Winchester, UK: Zero Books, 2015.
- The Communist Differend: Essays on Toni Negri and Alain Badiou. Tokyo: Koshisha, 2017.
- Una visión compleja. Hacia una estética de la economía. Lima: Meier Ramirez, 2020.
- La abstracción real. Filosofia, estética y capital. Santiago, Chile: Palinodia, 2021.
- The SAGE Handbook of Marxism, in 3 vol. (with Sara Farris, Bev Skeggs and Svenja Bromberg). London: SAGE, 2022.
- Terms of Disorder: Keywords for an Interregnum. London and Calcutta: Seagull Books, 2023.
- Late Fascism: Race, Capitalism and the Politics of Crisis. London and New York:Verso, 2023.

== Film appearances ==
- Marx Reloaded, ZDF/Arte, April 2011.

== See also ==
- Speculative realism
