= Side out =

Side out or Side-out may refer to:

- Side out, a term indicating a team has lost their right to serve in sports such as:
  - Pickleball
  - Volleyball
- Side Out, a 1990 American sports film
- Side-Out Foundation, an American non-profit breast cancer charity
- Side-out scoring, a point scoring system used in some racket and net sports

== See also ==
- Inside Out (disambiguation)
