= The John Cooper School =

Prep school in The Woodlands, Texas, US

Location
- One John Cooper Drive; The Woodlands, Texas 77381; United States; 30.175°N 95.526°W

Information
- Type: Independent; Co-educational; College preparatory Non-residential
- Motto: From Curiosity To Wisdom
- Established: 1988; 38 years ago
- Head of school: Dr. Stephen Popp
- Faculty: 163 full time; 71% hold advanced degrees
- Enrollment: 1400
- Average class size: 17
- Student to teacher ratio: 10:1
- Campus type: Suburban
- Colors: Green and Black
- Athletics: Male and Female Varsity, Junior Varsity, and Middle School
- Athletics conference: Southwest Preparatory Conference
- Mascot: Dragon
- Website: www.johncooper.org

The John Cooper School is an independent, college-preparatory, nonsectarian, co-educational day school located in The Woodlands, an unincorporated planned community in Montgomery County, Texas, United States.

== Overview ==
The John Cooper School is an independent, college-preparatory, day school for students in prekindergarten through grade 12. The campus is located in a forested area of The Woodlands, Texas, a planned community of approximately 114,000 residents located approximately 40 miles (64 km) north of Houston. As of 2026, Cooper enrolls 539 students in the Upper School, 345 in the Middle School, and 516 in the Lower School for a total enrollment of 1,400.

== History ==
The John Cooper School was established in 1988 as part of the original plan for The Woodlands, a master-planned community north of Houston. The community's founder was George P. Mitchell, who donated a 43-acre tract for the school campus. The John Cooper School was funded by corporate and private benefactors, parents, and other supporters in The Woodlands and the Houston metropolitan area and was named in honor of John Cooper, the retired headmaster of Houston's Kinkaid School.

George Mitchell collaborated with John Cooper to outline the school's framework, and John Cooper guided the school through its formation and early years of operation. He recruited Marina Ballantyne, the former admissions director at Rice University, to become the school’s founding Head of School. Ballantyne modeled the early curriculum after experimental schools, aiming to combine traditional education with progressive, project-based student learning. She created the school's mascot, Draco the Dragon, after observing a dragon sea serpent statue in Lake Woodlands.

The school opened on September 6, 1988, with an enrollment of 175 students in Pre-Kindergarten through Grade 7. One additional grade level was added each successive year, and the first senior class graduated in 1994. The opening enrollment of 1,400 students for the 2026–27 academic year represents the school's largest ever student body.

== Leaders ==
Dr. Marina Ballantyne (1988–1995) - Dr. Ballantyne served as the founding Head of The John Cooper School. She started working to help structure the institutional framework and guide construction in September 1987 and officially opened the campus to its first classes in September 1988.

Michael F. Maher (2000–2022) - Mr. Maher took office in 2000 and went on to lead the institution for 22 years. Under his lengthy tenure, the school grew dramatically, doubling its facility space and expanding its enrollment past 1,200 students. In 2015, Mr. Maher stated that the opening of ExxonMobil's offices in north Harris County would increase demand for The John Cooper School.

Dr. Stephen Popp (2022–Present) - Dr. Popp was officially appointed the new Head of The John Cooper School for the start of the 2022-23 school year. Dr. Popp previously served as the Upper School Headmaster and Assistant Head of School.

== Campus ==
The campus layout was designed using a multi-phase plan that expanded alongside the school's enrollment. Phase I, completed in 1994, established an eight-classroom Lower School addition and a 15,000-square-foot gymnasium.

Phase II, completed in 2002, added a 28,000-square-foot athletic facility and a dedicated art barn.

Phase III integrated a 15,000-square-foot student center and dining hall which opened in 2005.

The 38,000-square-foot Glenn Performing Arts Center opened in August, 2008, and features a 515-seat main stage theater, 125-seat black box theater and choir, drama, band and dance classrooms.

A new Upper School Library, Middle/Upper School Health Center, and four additional classrooms were added in 2011 in addition to the Pugh Football Field.

A new 16,500-square-foot Lower School 5th Grade classroom facility opened to the Lower School Student and Faculty Body for the 2013-2014 school year.

In August 2016, the school opened the Rock Math+Science Center, a three-story, 60,000-square-foot facility designed for project-based learning. The facility includes three Middle School science laboratories, six Upper School science labs, seven mathematics classrooms, a robotics lab, a computer lab, and a 135-seat lecture hall. The building features an environmentally conscious design, an outdoor courtyard, and the Finnie Family Rooftop Garden and Observatory.

A new, 4,250-square-foot Lower School library building opened in spring of 2018, and the former library was renovated to consolidate administrative offices.

In August 2024, the school opened a new, 25,000-square-foot Athletic Center with weight room, locker rooms, training room, and cheer and practice facilities.

== Accreditation ==
A non-profit corporation governed by a Board of Trustees, Cooper earned its first accreditation by the Independent Schools Association of the Southwest (ISAS) in 1998. That accreditation has continuously been renewed even after a comprehensive review in 2008 and 2018. In addition to its formal accreditation, The John Cooper School holds active memberships in several prominent educational organizations:

- National Association of Independent Schools (NAIS)
- National Association for College Admission Counseling (NACAC)
- Council for Advancement and Support of Education (CASE)
- College Entrance Examination Board (CEEB)
- Educational Records Bureau (ERB)
- Cum Laude Society of America

== Rankings ==
The John Cooper School is ranked as follows:

- #1 Private School In The Woodlands
- #2 Best Private K-12 School In Texas
- #2 Best Private High School In Texas
- #5 Best High School for STEM In Texas

== Academic program ==
=== Curriculum by division ===
==== Lower School (prekindergarten - 5th Grade) ====
The Lower School uses a balanced literacy approach for reading and writing, conceptual math problem-solving, and a hands-on science program in dedicated labs, complemented by Spanish, fine arts, PE, and the Responsive Classroom approach for social-emotional growth.

==== Middle and Upper School (6th - 12th Grade) ====
In the Middle and Upper Schools, academics include English, mathematics, science, social sciences, world languages, physical education, visual arts, and performing arts. The school features a rigorous college-preparatory track. Upper School graduation requirements include four years of English, three years of World Languages, three years of Social Science, three years of Mathematics, three years of Science, two years of Physical Education, two years of Fine Arts, and two years of additional electives.

The John Cooper School offers 22 Advanced Placement (AP) courses with 95% of students earning a score of 3 or higher.

Spanish is offered in prekindergarten through 12th grade, and French is offered beginning in the sixth grade.

The John Cooper School has been recognized by being nominated for the prestigious Siemens Advanced Placement High School Award for having one of the strongest AP math and science programs in the state.

Average SAT composite scores range around 1373, and the average ACT composite score is 31.

The school maintains a 100% college acceptance and matriculation rate, supported by five full-time college counselors for each graduating class, and students have been accepted to top colleges and universities, nationally and internationally.

== Fine Arts Program ==
The John Cooper School Fine Arts Program includes both visual and performing arts and is designed to provide students with classroom instruction, as well as performance and exhibition opportunities.

The Fine Arts program has the following facilities:

- 500 seat theater
- 125 seat black box theater
- Middle and Upper School art studio
- Lower School art room
- Lower School music rooms
- Multimedia production lab
- 3D animation lab
- Innovation lab
- Band room
- Chorus room
- Dance studio
- Scene shop
- Costume room

== Athletics ==
=== Varsity team sports and programs ===
Over 75% of Cooper's Middle and Upper School students participate in at least one sport. Students choose to compete in girls volleyball and softball, boys football and baseball, and boys and girls cross country, soccer, basketball, track, tennis, swimming, cheerleading, and golf. Lacrosse was introduced in the 2025-2026 school year to that year's 6th and 7th graders.

Since 2004, varsity teams have competed in the Southwest Preparatory Conference that comprises 21 independent schools in Texas and Oklahoma.

Cooper's first state championship was achieved by the varsity girls tennis team, who won the 1992 TAPPS Class A title. More recently, the football team won the SPC 3A championship in 2021, their first-ever state title in football, and repeated the feat in 2022. The Boys Varsity Tennis Team have also achieved many accomplishments, winning back-to-back SPC 4A Championships in 2022 and 2023

The Middle School teams participate in the Houston Junior Preparatory Conference.

=== Athletic facilities ===
==== Indoor spaces ====
The John Cooper School has a 25,000-square-foot Athletics Center (training, weight, and fitness rooms), 30,000-square-foot Dunlap Gymnasium (two courts for volleyball and basketball), and the Lower School-dedicated Austin Gymnasium.

==== Outdoor space ====
The John Cooper School several lighted ourdoor playing fields, including a football and soccer field, a six-lane track, baseball and softball diamonds, a batting cage, and a tennis complex.

== Extracurricular activities ==
Extensive club, service, and leadership opportunities are offered at all grade levels. The school community contributes to club and service projects in all divisions as well as school-wide efforts such as the Habitat for Humanity Project that has partially funded and constructed Habitat homes each year since 1999, the Empty Bowls Project held each February to support and fund local hunger relief efforts, and the Dig Pink week held each October to raise funds and awareness for breast cancer. The Cooper Dig Pink fundraiser raised the most money in the nation in both 2015 and 2016.

== Notable alumni ==
- Mallory Bechtel — Actress
- Coby Cotton — YouTuber from the channel Dude Perfect
- Cory Cotton — YouTuber from the channel Dude Perfect
- Rachel Stelter — Professional National Women's Soccer League soccer player
