= Chloé Sweetlove =

British actress

- Occupation: Actress
- Years active: 2016-present
- Television: Bergerac

Chloé Sweetlove is a British-South African actress. On television, she is known for her roles in the Paramount+ series The Crow Girl (2025) and the UKTV series Bergerac (2025-present). Her film credits include The Last Sunrise (2026).

== Early life ==
Sweetlove grew up between Cape Town, South Africa and Britain.

== Career ==
Sweetlove started acting at a young age and had her first role in the ITV series Tutankhamun (2016), portraying young Evelyn, alongside Sam Neill and Max Irons.

Sweetlove appeared as Madeleine in 2025 Channel 4 crime thriller The Crow Girl. She also appeared in 2025 BBC One drama series Wild Cherry.

Sweetlove plays Kim Bergerac, troubled daughter of eponymous detective Jim Bergerac, in the rebooted television series Bergerac set in Jersey, first broadcast in 2025, with Sweetlove returning for the second series in 2026.

Sweetlove appears in the 2026 film adaptation of The Last Sunrise alongside Maia Reficco and Eva Longoria, released on Amazon Prime Video.

== Filmography ==
=== Film ===
Year	Title	Role	Notes
2018	My Husband's Double Life	Zoe	
2026	The Last Sunrise	Amara	

=== Television ===
Year	Title	Role	Notes
2016	Tutankhamun	Young Evelyn	1 episode
2025-2026	The Crow Girl	Madeleine Burkeman	6 episodes
2025–present	Bergerac	Kim Bergerac	12 episodes
2025	Wild Cherry	Tallulah	2 episodes
