= Tell Me Softly =

- Spanish: Dímelo bajito
- Directed by: Denis Rovira
- Screenplay by: Jaime Vaca
- Based on: Dímelo bajito by Mercedes Ron
- Produced by: Borja Pena; Emma Lustres
- Starring: Alícia Falcó; Fernando Lindez; Diego Vidales
- Production companies: Vaca Films; Amazon MGM Studios
- Distributed by: Amazon Prime Video
- Release date: 12 December 2025
- Running time: 120 minutes
- Country: Spain
- Language: Spanish

Tell Me Softly (Spanish: Dímelo bajito) is a 2025 Spanish romantic drama film directed by Denis Rovira and written by Jaime Vaca. Produced under Vaca Films, it stars Alícia Falcó, Fernando Lindez and Diego Vidales. Based on the novel of the same name by Mercedes Ron.

The film was released on Amazon Prime Video on 12 December 2025.

== Plot ==
Kamila "Kami" learned years ago to live a textbook life. But she hadn't counted on the sudden return of the Di Bianco brothers, her best childhood friends. Thiago, the eldest, was her first love, while Taylor was her ally, her unwavering support, and her protector. The three were inseparable until a terrible event caused the Di Biancos to disappear, in theory, forever. With their return, buried feelings will resurface, and others never before confessed.

== Cast ==
- Alícia Falcó as Kamila Hamilton
- Fernando Líndez as Thiago Di Bianco
- Diego Vidales as Taylor Di Bianco
- Celia Freijeiro as Chiara
- Patricia Vico as Anne
- Andrés Velencoso as Tino
- Eve Ryan as Cata
- Fernando Nagore as Jules
- Jan Buxaderas as Dani

== Production ==
=== Development ===
The film was officially commissioned by Amazon Prime Video, with Denis Rovira serving as director and the script is penned by Jaime Vaca, while Vaca Films managed the production.

=== Casting ===
Alícia Falcó, Fernando Líndez, Diego Vidales, Celia Freijeiro, Patricia Vico, Andrés Velencoso, Eve Ryan, and Fernando Nagore were confirmed to appear in the film.

=== Filming ===
Principal photography of the film commenced in October 2024 and filming ended in December 2024. The filming took place in Galicia.

== Release ==
The film teaser was released on 24 July 2025, followed by the trailer on 12 November 2025.

The film was made available to stream on Amazon Prime Video on 12 December 2025.

== Reception ==
Enid Román Almansa of Cinemanía rated the film two-and-a-half stars out of five. María José Cánovas of Los Lunes Seriéfilos gave it 6 out of 10.

== Sequel ==
A sequel titled Tell Me in Secret (Dímelo en Secreto) was announced in October 2025.
