= Pretty Little Liars (2022 TV series) =

American slasher drama television series (2022–2024)

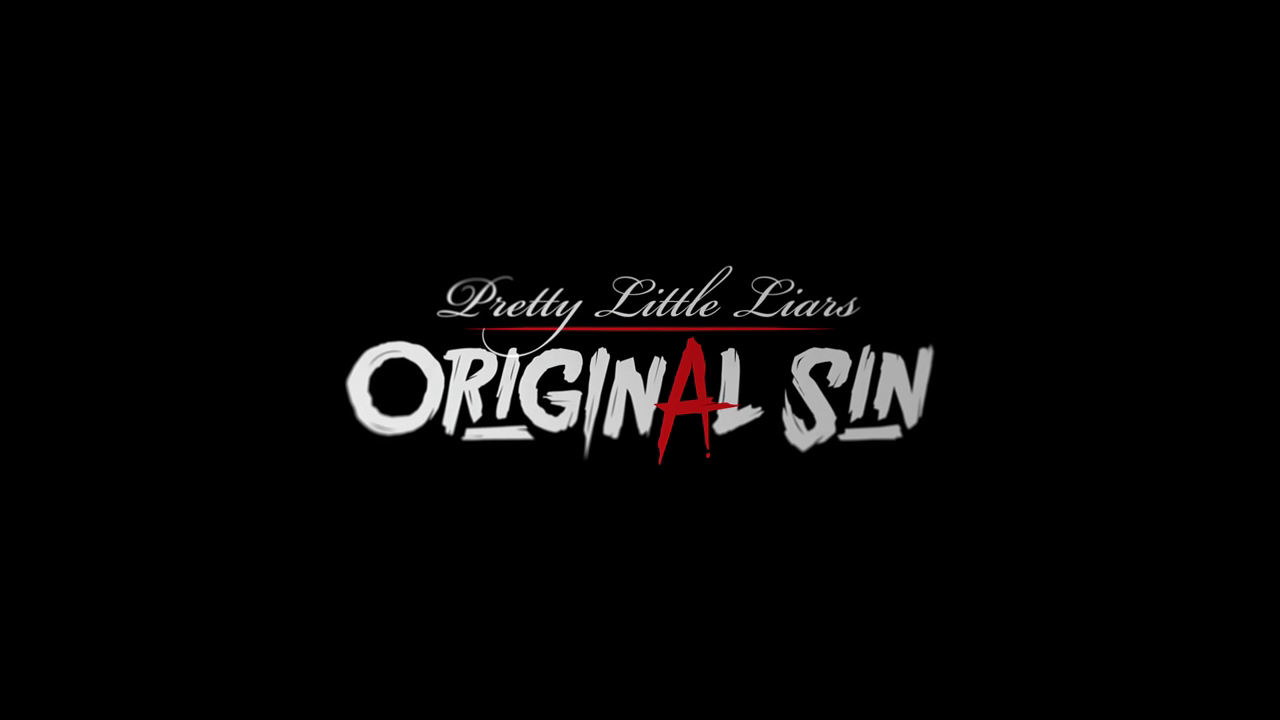
- Title card for the first season
- Also known as: Pretty Little Liars: Original Sin (season 1); Pretty Little Liars: Summer School (season 2)
- Genre: Slasher; Mystery; Teen drama; Thriller
- Created by: Roberto Aguirre-Sacasa & Lindsay Calhoon Bring
- Based on: Pretty Little Liars by Sara Shepard
- Showrunner: Roberto Aguirre-Sacasa
- Creative director: Neil Patel
- Starring: Bailee Madison; Chandler Kinney; Zaria; Malia Pyles; Maia Reficco; Mallory Bechtel; Sharon Leal; Elena Goode; Eric Johnson; Alex Aiono; Lea Salonga; Jordan Gonzalez; Elias Kacavas
- Music by: Joseph Bishara; Ronit Kirchman
- Opening theme: "Secret" by the Pierces (season 1) Transviolet (season 2)
- Country of origin: United States
- Original language: English
- No. of seasons: 2
- No. of episodes: 18

Production
- Executive producers: Marlene King; Gina Girolamo; Leslie Morgenstein; Caroline Baron; Michael Grassi; Roberto Aguirre-Sacasa; Lindsay Calhoon Bring
- Producers: Jimmy Gibbons; Jenina Kibuka; Amy Myrold; Sean Fogel
- Cinematography: Joe Collins; Anka Malatynska; Teodoro Maniaci; Stanley Fernandez; Carmen Cabana
- Editors: Elizabeth Czyzewski; Joseph Hatton; Leigh Dodson; Andrew Kasch; Amy Stuvland Parks
- Running time: 47–53 minutes
- Production companies: Muckle Man Productions; Alloy Entertainment; Warner Bros. Television

Original release
- Network: HBO Max
- Release: July 28 – August 18, 2022
- Network: Max
- Release: May 9 – June 20, 2024

Related
- Pretty Little Liars franchise

Pretty Little Liars is an American slasher teen drama mystery television series created by Roberto Aguirre-Sacasa and Lindsay Calhoon Bring for HBO Max. It is the fourth and final television series in the Pretty Little Liars franchise, which is based on the novel series written by Sara Shepard, and set within the same continuity as the previous series. The series features an ensemble cast, headed by Bailee Madison, Chandler Kinney, Zaria, Malia Pyles, and Maia Reficco.

Warner Bros. announced the series' development with Aguirre-Sacasa as showrunner in September 2020. It was given a straight-to-series order by HBO Max at the end of the same month. Filming took place in New York during the COVID-19 pandemic. It is the only series in the Pretty Little Liars franchise to be carried on HBO Max instead of ABC Family/Freeform.

The first season, titled Original Sin, premiered on July 28, 2022. In September 2022, the series was renewed for a second season, subtitled Summer School, that premiered on May 9, 2024. In September 2024, the series was canceled after two seasons, ending on an unresolved cliffhanger.

== Plot ==
The lives of 5 teenage girls living in Millwood, Pennsylvania, begin intersecting as they all receive cryptic text messages from an anonymous stalker calling themselves A, as they are the targets in a plan of revenge for the actions of their mothers committed that resulted in the suicide of a classmate of theirs at a New Years Eve Party back in 1999.

== Cast and characters ==
=== Main ===
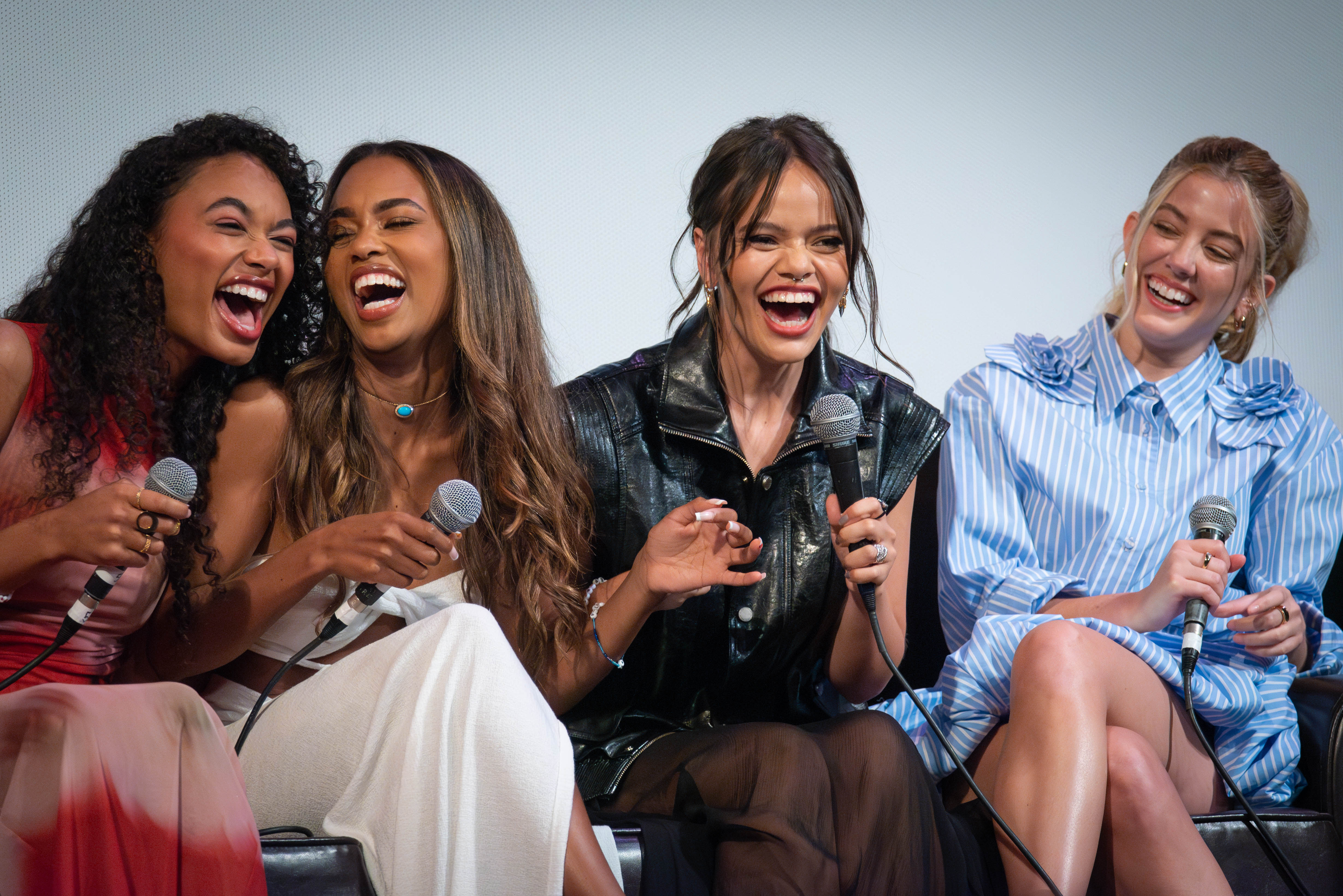
Part of the series' main cast at the 2024 ATX Television Festival. From left to right: Chandler Kinney, Zaria, Malia Pyles, and Mallory Bechtel

- Bailee Madison as Imogen Adams, a resourceful pregnant teen and leader of the Little Liars
- Chandler Kinney as Tabitha "Tabby" Haworthe, an aspiring filmmaker and horror film fanatic
- Zaria as Faran Bryant, a determined ballerina who deals with racism in the industry
- Malia Pyles as Minnie "Mouse" Honrada, an Internet-obsessed teen with a history of trauma
- Maia Reficco as Noa Olivar, a track star freshly out of juvie
- Mallory Bechtel as:
  - Karen Beasley (season 1), the queen bee of Millwood High who recently had a falling out with Imogen
  - Kelly Beasley, Karen's twin sister who often is outshined by her sister
- Sharon Leal as Sidney Haworthe, a real estate agent and Tabby's mother
- Elena Goode as Marjorie Olivar (season 1), a nurse and Noa's mother
- Eric Johnson as Sheriff Tom Beasley (season 1), the local sheriff and the domineering patriarch of the Beasley family
- Alex Aiono as Shawn Noble, a popular jock and Noa's supportive boyfriend
- Lea Salonga as Elodie Honrada (season 1; guest season 2), one of Mouse's mothers, who tries to keep her daughter safe
- Jordan Gonzalez as Ash Romero (season 2; recurring season 1), Mouse's love interest
- Elias Kacavas as Greg Mantzoukas (season 2; recurring season 1), a popular jock and Karen's boyfriend

=== Recurring ===
- Carson Rowland as Chip Langsberry (season 1), Tabby's co-worker and former best friend who is revealed to have sexually assaulted not only Imogen but also Tabby
- Carly Pope as Davie Adams, Imogen's mother
  - Ava DeMary as teen Davie (season 1)
- Ben Cook as Henry Nelson, a ballerino and Faran's love interest
- Jennifer Ferrin as Martha Beasley, Karen and Kelly's mother and Sheriff Beasley's wife
- Derek Klena as Wes, Tabby's boss at the theater who recently graduated from film school at NYU
- Zakiya Young as Corey Bryant (season 1; guest season 2), Faran's mother and a paralegal at a Pittsburgh law firm
  - Kristian Mosley as teen Corey (season 1)
- Benton Greene as Zeke Bryant (season 1; guest season 2), Faran's father
- Kate Jennings Grant as Madame Giry (season 1; guest season 2), the ballet instructor at Millwood High
- Jeffrey Bean as Mr. Smithee (season 1; guest season 2), the film teacher at Millwood High
- Kim Berrios Lin as Shirley (season 1; guest season 2), one of Mouse's mothers
- Lilla Crawford as Sandy Quinn (season 1; guest season 2), Karen's friend
- Alexander Chaplin as Steve Bowers (season 1; guest season 2), a father who seeks comfort in Mouse after his daughter disappeared
- Kristen Maxwell as teen Sidney Haworthe (season 1)
- Sarah-Anne Martinez as teen Marjorie Olivar (season 1)
- Emily Bautista as teen Elodie Honrada (season 1)
- Gabriella Pizzolo as Angela Waters (season 1), a teenager from the mothers' past who killed herself at midnight during a rave to celebrate Y2K
- Robert Stanton as Marshall Clanton (season 1), the principal at Millwood High
  - Nico Kiefer as young Marshall Clanton (season 1)
  - Connor Marsh as teen Marshall Clanton (season 1)
- Brian Altemus as Tyler Marchand (season 1), a student who recorded an exploitative video of Karen
- Michael Maize as Joseph England alies Crazy Joe (season 1), former classmate of Angela Waters
  - Miles McKenzie as teen Joseph England (season 1)
- Charlie Hewson as Pastor Malachi (season 2)
- Annabeth Gish as Dr. Anne Sullivan (season 2), a therapist who previously helped Rosewood's Little Liars. The character was first introduced in the original Pretty Little Liars series.
- Ava Capri as Jen (season 2), Noa's fling in juvenile detention
- Antonio Cipriano as Johnny (season 2), Imogen's co-worker at Millwood's Ice Creamery and love interest
- Noah Alexander Gerry as Christian (season 2), Tabby's co-worker at the Orpheum and love interest
- Loretta Ables Sayre as Lola (season 2), Mouse's grandmother
- Susan Barnes Walker as Rose Waters (guest season 1; guest season 2), Angela and Archie's violently overprotective, severely strict and abusive religious mother with severe and untreated schizophrenia
  - Jeanette Bonner as young Rose
  - Abby Satty as teen Rose

=== Guest characters from Pretty Little Liars (2010) ===
- Charles Gray as Eddie Lamb (season 1), a former nurse at Radley Sanitarium who is now a maintenance manager at the Radley Hotel. Gray replaced Reggie Austin who played the character in the 2010 series.

== Episodes ==
Season	Title	Episodes	Originally released		
Season	Title	Episodes	First released	Last released	Network
1	Original Sin	10	July 28, 2022	August 18, 2022	HBO Max
2	Summer School	8	May 9, 2024	June 20, 2024	Max

=== Season 1: Original Sin (2022) ===
No. overall	No. in season	Title	Directed by	Written by	Original release date
1	1	"Chapter One: Spirit Week"	Lisa Soper	Roberto Aguirre-Sacasa & Lindsay Calhoon Bring	July 28, 2022
In 1999, teen Angela Waters commits suicide at a party after her pleas for help are ignored by everyone, including popular girls Davie Adams, Sidney Haworthe, Corey Bryant, Elodie Honrada, and Marjorie Olivar. Twenty-two years later, Davie receives an envelope with the flyer from the party and an ominous message written on the back. Her teenage pregnant daughter, Imogen, and Imogen's ex-best friend, Karen Beasley, find Davie dead in the bathtub with an 'A' scrawled in blood nearby, to Imogen's shock and confusion. Imogen moves in with Sidney and Sidney's daughter, Tabby, and a month later returns to school. After panicking about her future of raising the baby with no support, Imogen fights with Karen and decides to run against her for Spirit Week Queen and also receives a mysterious message from an unknown person. Meanwhile, Tabby promotes a double feature screening at her workplace, the Orpheum; like Imogen, she soon receives a strange text. Fellow students Noa Olivar, Minnie 'Mouse' Honrada and Faran Bryant also receive similar messages. Meanwhile, a masked figure is watching them. The figure murders a school janitor who found the former's secret lair. Imogen, Tabby, Noa, Mouse, and Faran end up in detention for multiple incidents against Karen. Thinking that Karen framed them, they agree to get revenge against her.
2	2	"Chapter Two: The Spirit Queen"	Lisa Soper	Roberto Aguirre-Sacasa & Lindsay Calhoon Bring	July 28, 2022
The Little Liars devise a plan to humiliate Karen after Imogen shows them an embarrassing video of Karen. Tabby suggests to play it during the double feature at the Orpheum, so no one can record it. Students gather at the Orpheum for the movies; the video is played before the first film and an humiliated Karen flees, followed by her twin, Kelly. Kelly, impersonating Karen, confesses to Principal Clanton that she was the one that committed the crimes The Liars were punished for, but this was just the twins' plan to get back at Imogen for the video. Karen drops out of the spirit queen race. The girls arrive at the dance, and the principal announces Imogen as the spirit queen. Previously, Kelly proposed to get revenge at Imogen by pouring a bucket of red paint on her while she receives her crown. (Note: A reference to the movie Carrie.) Before the plan is executed, the girls see Karen hiding in the rafters and try to warn Imogen. Imogen heeds their warning and looks up to see the masked figure push Karen to her death. The girls receive a text message from "A", who killed Karen for being a bully and threatens them to keep silent or they'll be next.
3	3	"Chapter Three: Aftermath"	Maggie Kiley	Michael Grassi & Evelyn Yves	July 28, 2022
Shortly after the bloody incident, Imogen informs the girls that a masked figure pushed Karen to death, and they reveal to have also seen the figure. Scared to tell the truth, Kelly suggests to Tom that Karen may have committed suicide due to the embarrassing video. An angered Tom is determined to punish the girls. Imogen discovers a news about Angela Waters, a teenager whose body was found days after her death in 1999, in an abandoned warehouse. She visits the warehouse, and soon the masked creeper arrives. While revisiting the warehouse with Tabby, Sidney arrives and explains what happened to Angela the night of the rave, but lies about other details. Noa tries to convince Faran and Mouse to blame Karen's death on Imogen and Tabby after the Sheriff harassed her, but eventually sides with them. Noa reveals to Shawn that she took the blame for her mother's drug use. After telling her father the truth, Kelly meets with Imogen and apologizes for her actions, blaming herself for Karen's death. The Little Liars visit Karen's grave with their own personal messages for her, as the masked creeper is watching them from his van.
4	4	"Chapter Four: The (Fe)male Gaze"	Lisa Soper	Eleanor Jean & Jenina Kibuka	August 4, 2022
In 1999, Marjorie convinces Angela to smoke, but blames her when they got caught and later gives her a friendship doll. In 2022, Marjorie receives the same doll with taunting messages. Tabby and Chip partner for a film project, recreating the shower scene from Psycho and asked Faran & Greg to act. Greg's actions during filming triggered Tabby, who has blurry visions about a party in the woods. Faran begins to believe that Kelly is actually Karen and asked Henry to investigate, since Karen would have a scar on her foot due to the razor blade put on her shoes. During a visit by Sheriff Beasley to the Olivars' apartment, he finds drugs and Marjorie quickly blames it on Noa, who managed to swerve. Later, the masked creeper chases Noa on the building and forces her to "punish the guilty". She reluctantly called the hospital and told them Marjorie has been stealing drugs.
5	5	"Chapter Five: The Night He Came Home"	Lisa Soper	Katie Avery & Alexis Scheer	August 4, 2022
In Halloween 1999, Davie and her friends convince Angela to throw dog feces at a house, but leave her. Tabby is angered by Chip, who finished their project without her, since she wants it to be taken from the female gaze; he apologizes and offers to reshoot the scene together. Henry tells Faran that Kelly indeed has the scar Karen would have, convincing her even more that Kelly is actually Karen. However, Madame Giry reveals that Kelly has self-harmed in the past, and a regretful Faran tries to befriend her. Unwilling to sell her house due to unanswered questions, Imogen plans to throw a fundraising Halloween party. At work, Tabby is harassed by a jock and fellow student, Tyler, who later harasses Minnie at Imogen's party. The masked creeper, who has been lurking around Imogen's house, wears the mask Angela wore in 1999 and kills Tyler. After witnessing Kelly kissing Greg, Faran again accuses her of being Karen. Mouse meets with Steve whose daughter, Rachel is missing and roleplays as her. After the party, Tabby and Imogen reveal to each other that they both have been sexually assaulted.
6	6	"Chapter Six: Scars"	Cierra "Shooter" Glaudé	Pamela Garcia Rooney & Danielle Iman	August 11, 2022
Tabby recounts the night she was drugged and raped but reveals to Imogen that she does not know the identify of the assailant. Imogen also confides that her pregnancy was a result of being raped the night of Karen's party but does not remember due to being heavily intoxicated. The two meet with Joseph England, a former classmate of their mothers, and learn that Angela's mother, Rose, was committed to Radley Sanitarium after Angela's suicide. After further investigating, they learn that Angela was raped and that Rose was visited by Sidney, Davie, Elodie, Marjorie, Corey, and a sixth unknown person. Meanwhile, Noa fails to convince Marjorie to attend rehab and Steve begins stalking Mouse. Faran and Corey's relationship is further strained after they both receive messages from "A" that reveal Faran's corrective scoliosis surgery was not necessary.
7	7	"Chapter Seven: Carnival of Souls"	Alex Sanjiv Pillai	Daniel G. King & Neil McNeil	August 11, 2022
8	8	"Chapter Eight: Bad Blood"	Megan Griffiths	Michael Grassi & Stasia Demick	August 18, 2022
9	9	"Chapter Nine: Dead and Buried"	Roxanne Benjamin	Roberto Aguirre-Sacasa and Lindsay Calhoon Bring	August 18, 2022
The Liars meet up with the mothers explaining Joseph's recent death. Joseph was also in love with Angela and may have been "A". It is revealed that Sidney, Davie, Elodie, Marjorie, and Corey bullied Angela in high school. Tabby and Imogen start to believe that "A" killed Crazy Joe and is still free. During breakfast at the Beasleys', it is revealed that Kelly is not supported by her parents and the Sheriff reveals that it should have been Kelly who slipped and not Karen. Imogen contacts her father to get written permission to exhume Davie's body in order to prove that she was murdered. The girls hear from Marjorie's clinic that there is a match for the DNA from the blood drive. Faran confronts Sheriff Tom and says that he needs to stop emotionally abusing Kelly and that he needs to resign as a Community Service leader due to Noa's allegations. Imogen learns from her father that her mother Davie used to date Tom Beasley in high school. After Faran's father is arrested, she goes to the Beasleys', revealing Tom's obsession with young boys. Mrs. Beasley reveals that Sheriff Tom was the one who raped Angela.
10	10	"Chapter Ten: Final Girls"	Lisa Soper	Roberto Aguirre-Sacasa & Lindsay Calhoon Bring & Michael Grassi	August 18, 2022
Tabby and Imogen confront Chip, suspecting him to be their rapist. "A" listens as Chip admits his actions and chases after him. While investigating the Waters' house, the Liars find clues that make them think that "A" might be Angela's secret brother. The five receive a text from "A", who is holding their mothers captive at school. Martha stabs Tom after he reveals his plan to murder-suicide the family, and Kelly rushes to help the girls after Imogen sends her an emergency text. The Liars find their mothers tied up in a makeshift courtroom at the school gym. Principal Clanton is Angela's father and the mastermind behind "A"; the masked figure is Angela's twin brother, Archie. After Tom raped Angela, Davie made the whole school ignore her and pretend that she did not exist, eventually leading to her suicide. With Davie dead, Clanton decides to punish Imogen personally and sacrifice her. Planning to kill Imogen for avenge of Angela, Archie chases and attacks her, just as she begins going into labor. Kelly arrives with Greg, who is shot by Clanton. Tabby subdues him, and Imogen manages to take Archie down, her water breaking moments later. Tom survives the stabbing, while Clanton and Chip are arrested. The Little Liars and their moms help Imogen get to the hospital in time and her baby is born. (Note: She was to be adopted by Aria and Ezra, two characters from the original series however Imogen changed her mind and gave her daughter to a local couple nearby as revealed in Season 2.) Archie later escapes the hospital, killing Tom and the guard, and attacks Chip.

=== Season 2: Summer School (2024) ===
No. overall	No. in season	Title	Directed by	Written by	Original release date	Prod. code
11	1	"Chapter Eleven: SpookySpaghetti.com"	Maggie Kiley	Roberto Aguirre-Sacasa & Lindsay Calhoon Bring	May 9, 2024	T72.10201
12	2	"Chapter Twelve: Summer Lovin"	Maggie Kiley	Michael Grassi	May 9, 2024	T72.10202
Because of the events of the Millwood Massacre the previous season affecting their grades, the girls are condemned to summer school while dealing with their own personal issues. Tabby meets her new co-worker and horror movie buff match who reminds her of Chip, Noa reconnects with someone in her past, Mouse investigates Bloody Rose and her victims, and Faran gets a job at the Millwood community pool while dealing with being the only female lifeguard. Meanwhile, Imogen is struggling with her anxiety due to various forms of haunting hallucinations and is having difficulty with taking her medications as a result. After visiting her dad at the Quarry, she applies for a job at a nearby diner under a false name. When the girls go to surprise her on her first day, they notice her name change and in behavior as well, much to their confusion and worry.
13	3	"Chapter Thirteen: Sweet Sixteen"	Roxanne Benjamin	Sara Saedi	May 16, 2024	T72.10203
14	4	"Chapter Fourteen: When a Stranger Calls Back"	Roxanne Benjamin	Danielle Iman	May 23, 2024	T72.10204
15	5	"Chapter Fifteen: Friday the 13th"	Alex Sanjiv Pillai	Katie Avery	May 30, 2024	T72.10205
16	6	"Chapter Sixteen: Hell House"	Alex Sanjiv Pillai	Delondra Mesa	June 6, 2024	T72.10206
After Noa's test, Tabby and Imogen realize they are the last ones on Bloody Rose's list. When it is revealed that Kelly's church group is performing Redemption House at Imogen's old home, the Liars discover the true motives behind it. An attempt to retaliate and set them straight goes awry when another member of the group faces their Final Girl test and makes a disturbing discovery.
17	7	"Chapter Seventeen: The Bogeyman"	Rob Seidenglanz	Jenina Kibuka	June 13, 2024	T72.10207
18	8	"Chapter Eighteen: Final Exam"	Rob Seidenglanz	Roberto Aguirre-Sacasa & Lindsay Calhoon Bring	June 20, 2024	T72.10208

== Production ==
=== Development ===
On September 2, 2020, it was announced that a new Pretty Little Liars series was in development at Warner Bros., with Riverdale creator Roberto Aguirre-Sacasa taking over as showrunner from I. Marlene King. The series takes place within the same continuity as the previous television series, but follows new characters and storylines in a new setting.

On September 24, 2020, HBO Max gave the series a direct-to-series order of 10 episodes and was named Pretty Little Liars: Original Sin, with Aguirre-Sacasa teaming up with Lindsay Calhoon Bring to develop the series. Aguirre-Sacasa also executive produces the series alongside King, Leslie Morgenstein and Gina Girolamo. Production companies involved with the series are Muckle Man Productions, Alloy Entertainment, and Warner Bros. Television.

On September 7, 2022, HBO Max renewed the series for a second season, retitled as Pretty Little Liars: Summer School. On September 20, 2024, Max cancelled the series after two seasons.

=== Casting ===
In July 2021, Chandler Kinney, Maia Reficco, and Bailee Madison were cast on starring roles. In August 2021, Zaria, Malia Pyles, Alex Aiono, Mallory Bechtel, and Eric Johnson joined the main cast. In September 2021, Carson Rowland, Jordan Gonzalez, Ben Cook, Elias Kacavas, Benton Greene, Lea Salonga, Sharon Leal, Carly Pope, Elena Goode, and Zakiya Young were cast in recurring roles. In November 2021, Cristala Carter, Derek Klena, Kate Jennings Grant, Robert Stanton, Jennifer Ferrin, Lilla Crawford, Brian Altemus, Anthony Ordonez, and Jeffrey Bean joined the cast in recurring capacities. In December 2021, Ava DeMary, Kristen Maxwell, and Gabriella Pizzolo were cast in recurring roles. In November 2022, Gonzalez was promoted as a series regular for the second season. In April 2023, Elias Kacavas had been promoted to a series regular for the second season. In the same month, it was reported that Annabeth Gish would reprise her role as Dr. Anne Sullivan from the original series.

=== Filming ===
The series was set to film at Upriver Studios in Saugerties, New York, in mid to late 2021. Filming began on August 23, 2021, in the city of Hudson, New York, during the COVID-19 pandemic. Filming wrapped on May 2, 2022.

The series' second season began filming in April 2023. In May 2023, it was reported that filming for the second season has been delayed due to the writers strike. However, after a deal was reached on September 27, along with the actors strike on November 9, filming for the second season resumed later that same month and wrapped on December 8, 2023.

=== Music ===
Film composer Joseph Bishara was hired to do the series' score for Original Sin. He is known for his work in horror movies, including the Insidious film series and The Conjuring franchise. A remix version of "Secret" by the Pierces appeared in the opening sequence. The original song was previously used as the opening theme in the original Pretty Little Liars, while Pretty Little Liars: The Perfectionists used a cover version by Denmark + Winter. In the second season, this time was covered by Transviolet.

Composer Ronit Kirchman was brought onto the Summer School season to score the original music. Kirchman's music, known primarily for her work on The Sinner, was recognized twice by IndieWire as a Best TV Score, where they state that "Kirchman is so deft at dialing up the dissonance in a way that, by the time anyone realizes that something's amiss, it's probably already too late."

The Original Sin and Summer School soundtrack albums are both available on WaterTower Music.

== Release ==
The series premiered on July 28, 2022, with the first three episodes available, followed by two more episodes each on August 4 and 11, and then the final three episodes on August 18. The second season, subtitled Summer School was released on May 9, 2024, with two new episodes, followed by a new episode on a weekly basis until the season finale on June 20, 2024.

== Reception ==
=== Critical response ===
Critical response of Pretty Little Liars
Season	Rotten Tomatoes	Metacritic
1	90% (20 reviews)	82 (5 reviews)
2	90% (10 reviews)	78 (4 reviews)

The first season, Original Sin, was met with critical acclaim from critics. The review aggregator website Rotten Tomatoes reported a 90% approval rating with an average rating of 7.1/10, based on 20 critic reviews. The website's critics consensus reads, "Boasting a tantalizing new mystery along with a refreshingly grounded crop of pretty little liars, Original Sin is a gossipy good time." Metacritic, which uses a weighted average, assigned a score of 82 out of 100 based on five critics, indicating "universal acclaim".

On Rotten Tomatoes, the second season, Summer School, holds an approval rating of 90% with an average rating of 7.2/10, based on 10 critic reviews. On Metacritic, the second season received a score of 78 based on four critics, indicating "generally favorable reviews".

Bailee Madison's performance was praised by critics.
