= Mallory Bechtel =

American musical theatre actress and singer

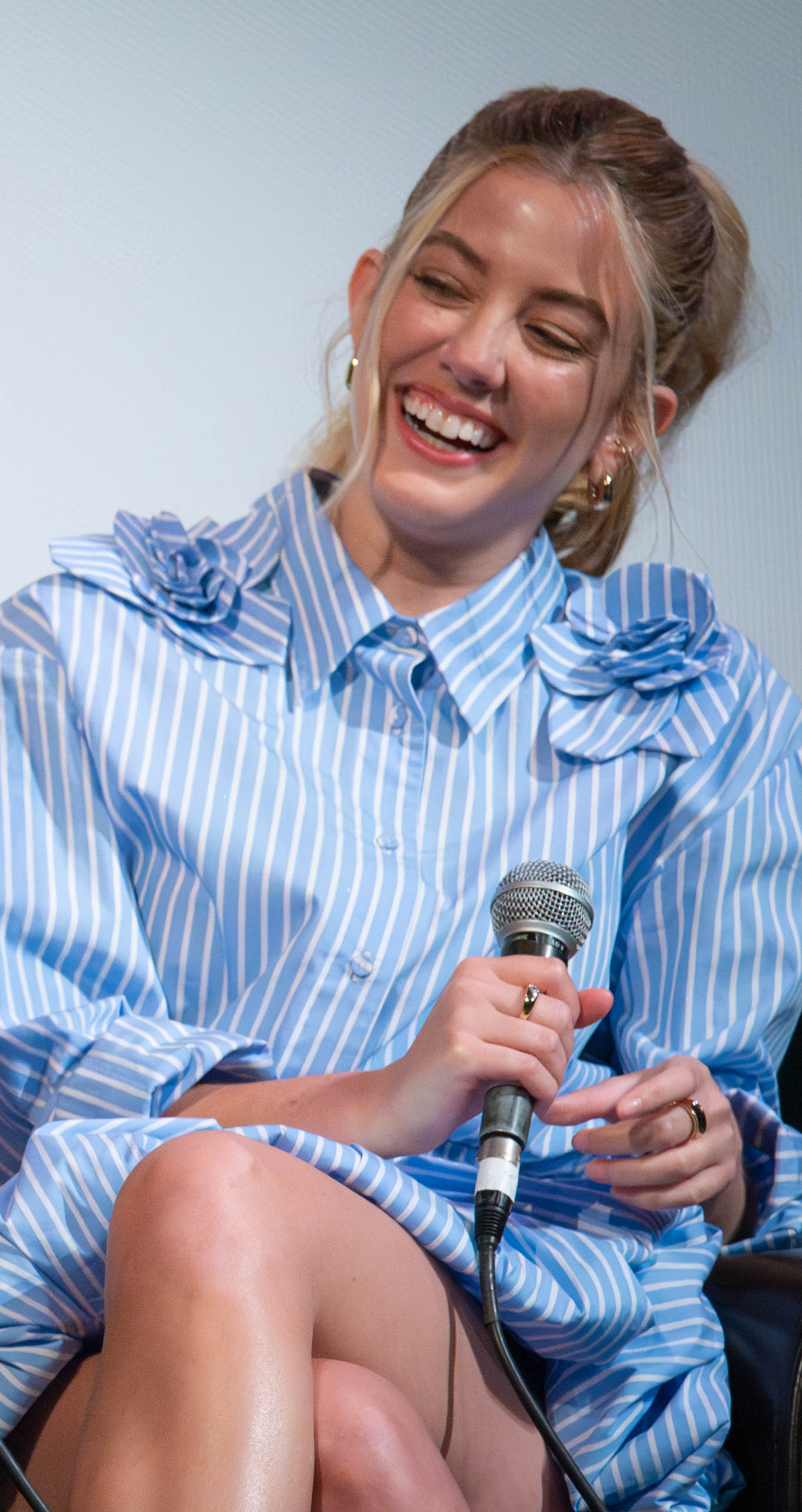
- Bechtel in 2024
- Born: 1999 or 2000 (age 26–27); The Woodlands, Texas, U.S.
- Occupation: Actress
- Years active: 2008–present
- Known for: Dear Evan Hansen; Pretty Little Liars

Mallory Bechtel (born 1999 or 2000) is an American actress. Known for her roles in musical theatre, she has performed as both a lead and understudy in several productions including her Broadway debut as Zoe Murphy in Dear Evan Hansen (2018–2019).

Bechtel made her screen debut in 2018 and later starred as twins Karen and Kelly Beasley in the HBO Max slasher horror Pretty Little Liars (2022–2024).

== Early life ==
Bechtel was born in and spent her early years in The Woodlands where she attended and graduated from The John Cooper School. Bechtel had plans to study at New York University Tisch School of the Arts after high school graduation but her plans were deferred when she was cast as Zoe Murphy in the musical Dear Evan Hansen in 2018.

== Career ==
Bechtel started acting at the age of eight. She appeared for the first time on the professional stage in 2008 when she was cast as Susan Waverly for Theatre Under the Stars production of White Christmas. In 2015, at the age of 15, Bechtel auditioned for the role of Zoe Murphy in Dear Evan Hansen, but was originally denied the part. Two years later, in August 2017, Bechtel was offered a vacation standby role for original Dear Evan Hansen cast member, Laura Dreyfuss. Bechtel never performed as Zoe during this time. However, in July 2018, she took over the role of Zoe Murphy full-time and was on stage at The Music Box Theatre for a year until July 2019. Gabrielle Carrubba took over the role of Zoe after Bechtel's departure from the show.

Apart from performing on stage, Bechtel has appeared in various shows and films. In 2018, Bechtel appeared on NBC's Law & Order: Special Victims Unit. The same year she was cast in Ari Aster's supernatural horror film, Hereditary. In 2020, Bechtel appeared in FBI: Most Wanted on CBS. Her cover of "Requiem" from Dear Evan Hansen garnered over 7 million views on YouTube and gained her a social audience of over sixty thousand followers on YouTube and Instagram collectively. Bechtel was scheduled to play Kim MacAfee in Bye Bye Birdie at the Kennedy Center in 2020, but the production was canceled because of the COVID-19 pandemic.

== Filmography ==
=== Theatre ===
Year	Production	Role	Notes
2017	Bring It On: The Musical	Eva	Theatre Under The Stars (Houston)
2018	Rent	Joanne	Theatre Under The Stars (Houston)
2018–2019	Dear Evan Hansen	Zoe Murphy	Broadway

=== Film ===
Year	Title	Role	Note(s)
2018	Hereditary	Bridget	
2021	Know Fear	Jami	
TBA	Merrily We Roll Along	Beth Spencer	Filming

=== Television ===
Year	Title	Role	Note(s)
2018	Law & Order: Special Victims Unit	Haley Sadler	Episode: "Send in the Clowns"
2020	FBI: Most Wanted	Leanne Manning	Episode: "Prophet"
2022–2024	Pretty Little Liars	Kelly Beasley Karen Beasley	Main cast; 18 episodes
2026	Tracker	Kayla	1 Episode

== Awards and nominations ==
Year	Award	Category	Work	Result
2019	Broadway.com Audience Choice Awards	Favorite replacement (Female)	Dear Evan Hansen	Nominated
