= Bergerac (2025 TV series) =

British television crime drama series

- Genre: Crime drama
- Created by: Toby Whithouse
- Based on: Bergerac by Robert Banks Stewart
- Written by: Toby Whithouse, Catherine Tregenna, Brian Fillas, Polly Buckle
- Starring: Damien Molony, Zoë Wanamaker, Philip Glenister
- Country of origin: United Kingdom
- Original language: English
- No. of seasons: 2
- No. of episodes: 12

Production
- Production company: BlackLight TV

Original release
- Network: UKTV
- Release: 27 February 2025 – present

Bergerac is a British crime drama television series broadcast on UKTV from 2025. It is a reboot of the television series of the same name that ran on BBC One from 1981 until 1991. It aired on U&Drama and is available to stream for free on U from 27 February 2025. A second series was commissioned in April 2025 and was released on 16 April 2026. Plans for a third series were announced in August 2026.

== Synopsis ==
Police detective Jim Bergerac solves crimes in Jersey. In the first series, while battling demons from his past and family issues, he is assigned to solve the murder of Cate, a female member of a wealthy family.

== Cast ==
=== Main characters ===
- Damien Molony as DCI James 'Jim' Bergerac
- Zoë Wanamaker as Charlie Hungerford
- Robert Gilbert as DI Barnabus 'Barney' Crozier
- Sasha Behar as Ch. Supt. Uma Dalal
- Celine Arden as DS Kara Molloy
- Luke Nunn as DC Simon Calvert
- Chloe Sweetlove as Kim Bergerac.

=== Series 1 (2025) ===
- Philip Glenister as Arthur Wakefield
- Pippa Haywood as Margaret Heaton
- Timothy Renouf as Julian Wakefield
- Aidan McArdle as Pete Benedict
- Stephen Wight as John Blakely
- Ayesha Antoine as Chloe Havron.

=== Series 2 (2026) ===
- Adrian Edmondson as Nigel Morton
- Lesley Sharp as Monica Barton
- Camilla Beeput as Nicola Barton
- Turlough Convery as Michael Barton
- Georgina Rich as Ruth Shillinger
- Charles Dale as DS Ian Monkford
- Jonathan Aris as Ch. Supt. Richard Gibbon.

== Series overview ==
Series	Episodes	Originally released
1	6	27 February 2025
2	6	16 April 2026

=== Series 1 (2025) ===
No. overall	No. in series	Title	Directed by	Written by	Original release date	UK viewers (millions)
1	1	"Person of Interest"	Colm McCarthy	Toby Whithouse and Brian Fillis	27 February 2025	N/A
2	2	"Play Nicely"	Colm McCarthy	Toby Whithouse	27 February 2025	N/A
3	3	"Alone, Alas, Alone"	Colm McCarthy	Brian Fillis and Toby Whithouse	27 February 2025	N/A
4	4	"Different Rules Apply"	Sean Spencer	Polly Buckle and Toby Whithouse	27 February 2025	N/A
5	5	"Run the Story"	Sean Spencer	Catherine Tregenna and Toby Whithouse	27 February 2025	N/A
6	6	"Fred"	Sean Spencer	Toby Whithouse	27 February 2025	N/A

=== Series 2 (2026) ===
No. overall	No. in series	Title	Directed by	Written by	Original release date	UK viewers (millions)
7	1	"King of Jersey"	Joss Agnew	Toby Whithouse	16 April 2026	N/A
8	2	"A Small Affair"	Joss Agnew	Ashley Sanders	16 April 2026	N/A
9	3	"Lone Wolf"	Joss Agnew	Faebian Averies and Toby Whithouse	16 April 2026	N/A
10	4	"Look Who's Back"	Nicole Volavka	Emilie Robson	16 April 2026	N/A
11	5	"Our Man in Bermuda"	Nicole Volavka	Brian Fillis and Toby Whithouse	16 April 2026	N/A
12	6	"No More Secrets"	Nicole Volavka	Toby Whithouse	16 April 2026	N/A

== Production ==
=== Development ===
A rebooted series of Bergerac, which originally featured John Nettles as fictional detective Jim Bergerac on BBC One, was reportedly planned in 2013 by the in-house BBC Drama team.

Another attempt, this time by Paramount Network, was planned in 2019. However, the series, which also involved Endemol Shine UK, was delayed in 2020.

A new six-part series to be shown on UKTV was announced in April 2024, to be produced by BlackLight TV. The series was written by Toby Whithouse, Catherine Tregenna, Brian Fillas and Polly Buckle. Filming was scheduled to take place on Jersey, among other locations, in the summer of 2024. In July 2024, it was confirmed that some money for the production was being provided by the Jersey Government by Kirsten Morel, the minister for Sustainable Economic Development.

A second series was commissioned in April 2025 and aired that spring. In August 2026, a third series was confirmed with Georgia Tennant and Jason Flemyng joining the cast.

=== Casting ===
In July 2024, Damien Molony was cast as Jim Bergerac. Actors previously linked to the role in 2024 had included Aidan Turner, James Norton and David Tennant.

The cast includes Zoe Wanamaker, Philip Glenister and Pippa Haywood. In June 2024, John Nettles was reported to have been offered a cameo role but declined, saying that, at 80 years old, he was "too old". In July 2024, Timothy Renouf joined the cast.

=== Filming ===
Filming began in Jersey in the summer of 2024, at locations including Torquay and St Helier. First-look images from filming were released in September 2024. That month, filming also took place in Plymouth, Devon.

== Broadcast ==
Bergerac aired on U&Drama on 27 February 2025 and is available to stream for free on U (formerly UKTV Play).

The first series aired on the Australian Broadcasting Corporation from 4 May 2025, with the second premiering on 26 April 2026.
