= Douggie McMeekin =

English actor

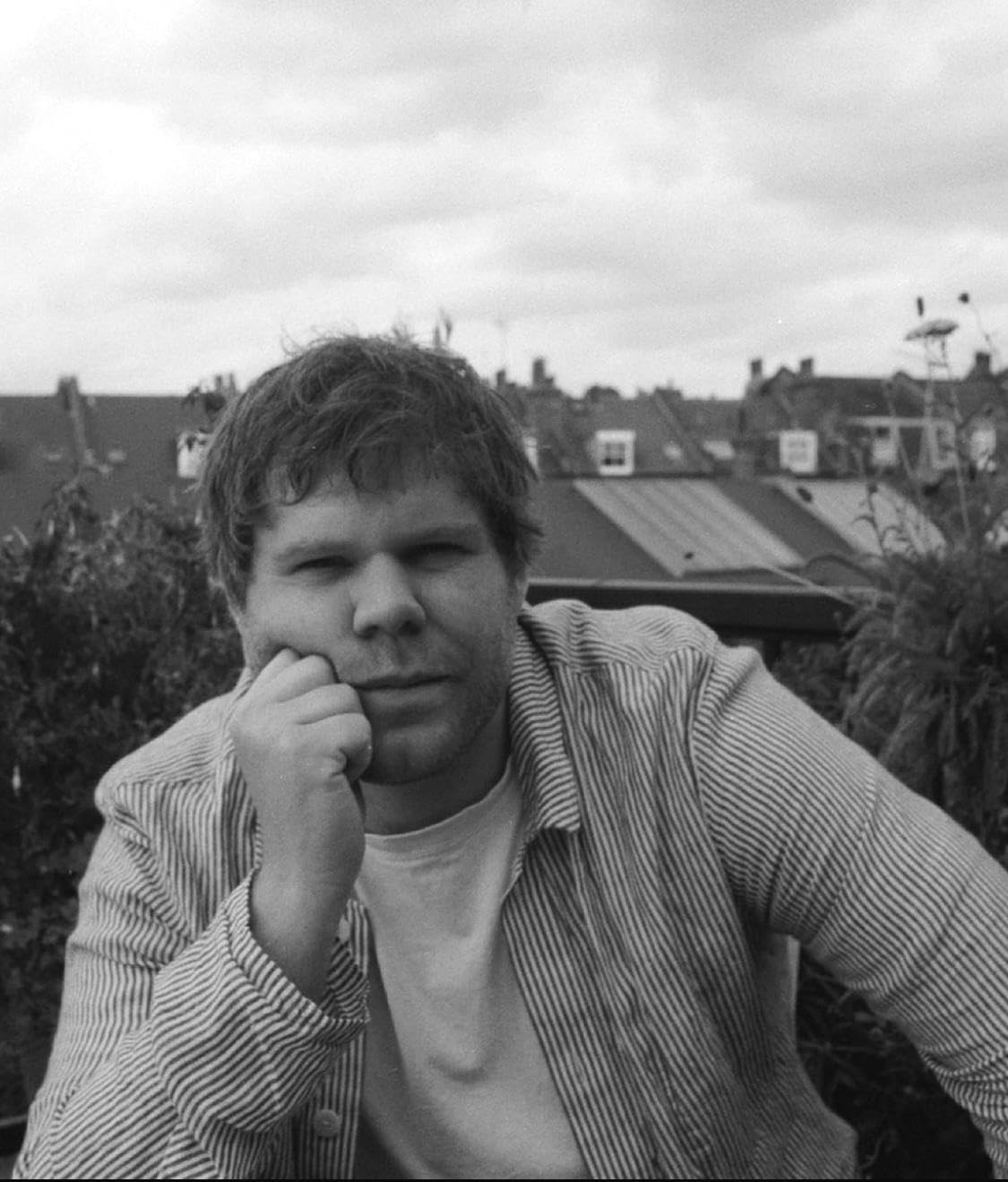
- Education: London Academy of Music and Dramatic Art
- Occupation: Actor
- Years active: 2015–present

Douggie McMeekin is an English stage, television and film actor.

== Early life ==
He graduated with a physics degree from the University of Nottingham. As a student he performed at the Edinburgh Fringe Festival and the National Student Drama Festival where he won the Judges Award for Acting in 2011. He later trained at London Academy of Music and Dramatic Art.

== Career ==
=== Theatre ===
He made his professional stage debut as one of the Lost Boys in Ella Hickson’s Wendy & Peter Pan at the Royal Shakespeare Company in 2015. His theatre roles have also included Nina Raine’s Bach & Sons at The Bridge Theatre in 2021. In April 2018, he was nominated for the Ian Charleson Awards for his performance as Snug the Joiner in A Midsummer Night's Dream at the Young Vic.

=== Film and television ===
In 2017, he played Sunny Blandford in The Crown. The following year he played Charles Quigley in historical drama Harlots. He later played Aleksandr Yuvchenko in historical drama Chernobyl.

He had a role in 2021 Cush Jumbo-led television series The Beast Must Die. He appeared in the 2022 Lena Dunham film Catherine Called Birdy.

In 2024, he could be seen playing Tindaro the sickly nobleman in Netflix historical comedy series The Decameron. That year he also appeared in the IVF film drama Joy, playing John Brown, the father of the first test tube baby.

== Filmography ==
Year	Title	Role	Notes
2015	A Gert Lush Christmas	Jake	
2016	The Call-Up	Adam	
2017-2019	Harlots	Charles Quigley	17 episodes
2017	The Crown	Sunny Blandford	1 episode
2018	Midsomer Murders	Dominic	1 episode
2019	Traitors	Harry Glover	1 episode
2019	The Hustle	Jason	Feature film
2019	Chernobyl	Aleksandr Yuvchenko	2 episodes
2020-2021	The Beast Must Die	Vincent O'Brien	5 episodes
2021	Ragdoll	Eric Turner	2 episode
2022	Catherine Called Birdy	Lord Rolf of Saxony	Feature film
2024	The Decameron	Tindaro	8 episodes
2024	Joy	John Brown	Feature film
2025	Too Much	William	1 episode
2025	Steve	Andy	Film
