= Elena Goode =

American actress and Ford model

- Occupations: Model; actress
- Years active: 2003 – present

Elena Goode is an American actress and model. She is known for her role as Jade Taylor on As the World Turns (2006–2007) and her role as Ma in the 2012 film Elliot Loves.

== Career ==
After Goode portrayed Jade on As the World Turns, she made a commercial for Domino's Pizza.

== Filmography ==
- 2003: Undefeated as Model #1
- 2006–2007: As the World Turns as Jade Taylor #1 (February 2, 2006 – July 17, 2007: 188 episodes)
- 2009: Circledrawers as Ema
- 2012: The Dictator as Virgin Guard
- 2012: Elliot Loves as Ma
- 2012: Gossip Girl as Daphne
- 2013: Blue Bloods as Vicky in "No Regrets"
- 2015: Straight Outta Compton as Nicole Threatt (Dr. Dre's wife)
- 2022-2024: Pretty Little Liars as Marjorie Olivar
- 2026: NCIS as Olivia Garcia in "In Too Deep"
