= Kally's Mashup =

- Genre: Telenovela
- Created by: Adam Anders; Anthony Falcón
- Written by: Patricia Maldonado
- Directed by: Diego Sánchez; Gustavo Cotta
- Starring: Maia Reficco; Alex Hoyer; Sara Cobo; Lalo Brito; Saraí Meza; Tupac Larriera; Tom CL; Daniela Flombaum; Camila Mateos; José Giménez Zapiola; Celeste Sanazi; Milagros Masini; Fernanda Serrano; Ana Julia Anglielio; Juan Cruz Cancheff; Josefina Willa; Zhongbo Li
- Theme music composer: Adam Anders; Nikki Anders; Peer Astrom; Wolfgang Amadeus Mozart
- Opening theme: "Key of Life"
- Countries of origin: Argentina; Mexico
- Original language: Spanish
- No. of seasons: 2 See template documentation for more info. -->
- No. of episodes: 120 + movie

Production
- Executive producers: Tatiana Rodríguez; Adam Anders
- Producer: Adam Anders
- Production companies: Telefe; 360 Powwow; Nickelodeon Latin America

Original release
- Network: Nickelodeon Latin America
- Release: October 23, 2017 – April 19, 2019

Kally's Mashup is a musical telenovela inspired by the life of Swedish producer Adam Anders. The series first aired on Nickelodeon Latin America on October 23, 2017 and aired for two seasons (120 episodes and 4 specials) until July 30, 2021. The series was produced by Nickelodeon along with Telefe, which was also the international distributor. The series was created and produced by Adam Anders along with Antony Falcón. Maia Reficco and Alex Hoyer both star with Reficco as the titular character.

In May 2018, it was confirmed that the show had been renewed for a second season, which premiered in Brazil on October 22, 2018 and in Latin America on February 18, 2019. In October 2019, Iñaki Orive from the company B & R360 (in charge of the distribution of the series) confirmed that a third season was in development. However, the third season was ultimately cancelled on October 16, 2020 due to the COVID-19 pandemic.

The series' conclusive movie, Kally's Mashup: Un Cumpleaños Muy Kally, was released on July 30, 2021 in Latin America and Brazil simultaneously.

== Plot ==
The series revolves around Kally – a 13 year-old musical prodigy who tries to balance her life as a virtuoso pianist and a normal teenage girl after moving from a small town to the country's most prestigious music college. Although everyone thinks she was born to be a classical pianist, her true dream is to become a pop star.

== Cast ==
- Maia Reficco as Kally Ponce
- Alex Hoyer as Dante Barkin
- Sara Cobo as Gloria Skyler
- Lalo Brito as Andrés "Andy" Guiderman
- Sarai Meza as Tina Barkin
- Tupac Larriera as Alexandro "Alex" Alvarez
- Tom CL as Kevin Alvarez
- Daniela Flombaum as Lucy Magliano
- Camila Mateos as Nicole Delon
- José Giménez Zapiola as Tomás "Tommy" Greco
- Celeste Sanazi as Estefanía "Stefi" Loreto
- Milagros Masini as Olivia Grimaldi
- Fernanda Serrano as Lisa Barnes
- Ana Julia Anglielio as Cindy Skyler
- Juan Cruz Cancheff as Evaristo
- Josefina Willa as Laia Meyer
- Zhongbo Li as Marco Li
- Danielle Arciniegas as Wintir

== Series overview ==
- Note 1: The second season was aired first in Brazil, between 22 October and 21 December 2018, few months before the Latin America airdate.

Series	Episodes		Originally released	
Series	Episodes		First released	Last released
1	75	30	23 October 2017	1 December 2017
1	75	45	5 March 2018	4 May 2018
2	45		18 February 2019	19 April 2019
Movie			July 30, 2021	
