= Baton (2026 film) =

Upcoming sports film by Danny Ramirez

- Directed by: Danny Ramirez
- Written by: Danny Ramirez
- Produced by: Victoria Alonso; Tom Culliver; Danny Ramirez; Joshua Harris; Ford Corbett
- Starring: Danny Ramirez; Maia Reficco; Lewis Pullman; Diego Calva; Camila Mendes; Mía Maestro; Gabriel Luna; Becky G; Édgar Ramírez; Eugenio Derbez; Rosario Dawson
- Cinematography: Lucas Gath
- Production companies: Mapuche Films; Pinstripes; Peachtree Media; Gramercy Park Media; Studio 99
- Release date: 2026
- Countries: United States; United Kingdom; Spain
- Language: English

Baton is an upcoming sports drama film written, co-produced, and directed by Danny Ramirez in his filmmaking debut. It stars Ramirez, Maia Reficco, Lewis Pullman, Diego Calva, Camila Mendes, Mía Maestro, Gabriel Luna, Becky G, Édgar Ramírez, Eugenio Derbez, and Rosario Dawson.

Baton is scheduled to be released in the United States in 2026.

== Cast ==
- Danny Ramirez
- Maia Reficco
- Diego Calva
- Camila Mendes
- Mía Maestro
- Lewis Pullman
- Édgar Ramírez
- Eugenio Derbez
- Rosario Dawson
- Gabriel Luna
- Becky G
- Ester Expósito
- Noah Beck
- Fiona Palomo

== Production ==
In November 2024, it was reported that actor Danny Ramirez would be making his directorial debut, as well as writing the script for a new soccer drama film, with Victoria Alonso serving as a producer and David Beckham as an executive producer.

Principal photography wrapped at Atlanta in February 2026, with Maia Reficco, Diego Calva, Camila Mendes, Mía Maestro, Ester Expósito, Becky G, Noah Beck, Lewis Pullman and 4 new additions rounding out the cast. In July 2026, it was reported that Major League Soccer had made a strategic partnership with the film's production, and that David Beckham would serve as an executive producer via his production company Studio 99.

== Release ==
Baton is scheduled to be released in the United States in 2026.
