= Anjelica Bette Fellini =

American actress (b. 1994)

- Born: November 26, 1994 (age 31); New York City, U.S.
- Occupation: Actress
- Years active: 2017–present

Anjelica Bette Fellini (born November 26, 1994) (Note: The date of birth source, HITC, specifies that Anjelica Bette Fellini "is understood to have a birthday of November 26th, 1994".) is an American actress known for her role as Rebecca Hoover/Twist in The Gifted (2018) and as Blair Wesley in the Netflix teen comedy-drama television series Teenage Bounty Hunters in 2020.

== Early life ==
Fellini was born in New York City where she was raised and resides. At an early age, Fellini attended the School of American Ballet (SAB) at the Lincoln Center, New York.

== Career ==
Fellini began her career as a dancer on Broadway. Her dance instructor first suggested she should take up acting, noting her lively and expressive character; by the age of 20, Fellini was performing on stage in The Phantom of the Opera.

In 2018, Fellini landed her first regular television role in Fox's The Gifted as Rebecca Hoover, also known as Twist, a former mental patient mutant liberated by the Inner Circle.

In 2019, Fellini was cast in a main role as Blair Wesley in the Netflix teen comedy-drama television series Teenage Bounty Hunters alongside Maddie Phillips, who plays her twin-sister Sterling, with Blair being the more rebellious sister. The series reached number one on the Netflix Top 10 soon after it first aired.

In 2021, Fellini appeared in the Wes Anderson film The French Dispatch, whose cast includes Tilda Swinton, Elisabeth Moss, Bill Murray, Benicio del Toro, Saoirse Ronan, Christoph Waltz, and Anjelica Huston.

== Personal life ==
Fellini is Jewish, which she confirmed on a livestream in 2020.

== Filmography ==
=== Film ===
Year	Title	Role
2017	Margot (Short)	Margot
2017	#Best Web Series Ever (Short)	Stephanie Roemer
2018	Too Close to the Sun (Short)	Isabella
2021	The French Dispatch	Proof Reader
2023	Classmates	Anabella
2023	Sid is Dead	Katie

=== Television ===
Year	Title	Role	Notes
2018	The Gifted	Rebecca Hoover / Twist	5 episodes
2020	Teenage Bounty Hunters	Blair Wesley	Main role
2025	Watson	Erika Filipello	Episode: "Pilot"
2026	Tires	Cara	Recurring role (Season 3)
