= The Decameron (TV series) =

American medieval black comedy television series

- Series title card
- Genre: Medieval; Black comedy
- Created by: Kathleen Jordan
- Inspired by: The Decameron by Giovanni Boccaccio
- Showrunner: Kathleen Jordan
- Starring: Amar Chadha-Patel; Leila Farzad; Lou Gala; Karan Gill; Tony Hale; Saoirse-Monica Jackson; Zosia Mamet; Douggie McMeekin; Jessica Plummer; Tanya Reynolds
- Composer: Ruth Barrett
- Country of origin: United States
- Original languages: English; Italian
- No. of episodes: 8

Production
- Executive producers: Michael Uppendahl; Blake McCormick; Tara Herrmann; Jenji Kohan; Kathleen Jordan
- Producers: Ashley Glazier; Anthony Natoli; Alex Orr
- Production location: Italy
- Cinematography: Michael McDonough; Emiliano Leurini
- Editors: Amy Fleming; Tamara Meem; Matt Ramsey
- Running time: 48–60 minutes
- Production companies: American Supercube; Tilted Productions

Original release
- Network: Netflix
- Release: July 25, 2024

The Decameron is a medieval black comedy television miniseries created by Kathleen Jordan. It is American-produced but is set and was filmed in Italy, and has a multinational cast. It was inspired by the 14th-century Italian short-story collection The Decameron by Giovanni Boccaccio. It was released on Netflix on July 25, 2024, to generally favorable reviews.

== Premise ==
In 1348, as the Black Death ravages Florence, a group of nobles and their servants retreat to the countryside Villa Santa. As they attempt to wait out the plague in the hills of Tuscany with wine, merriment, and sex, the protagonists eventually must fight for their survival.

== Cast ==
=== Main ===
- Amar Chadha-Patel as Dioneo, Tindaro's personal physician. A handsome and cynical opportunist, Dioneo has convinced the gullible Tindaro of his prowess as a doctor, and is using his patient to access wealthy donors who may help him climb the social ladder.
- Leila Farzad as Stratilia, the villa's cook. Untrusting of nobles in general and largely sarcastic to her fellow servants, she is a practical and pragmatic voice in the chaos.
- Lou Gala as Neifile, Panfilo's intensely religious wife. A devout Catholic who believes God can personally hear her prayers, she has naively taken a vow of chastity despite her loving relationship with her husband, and struggles to contain her strong sexual desire for men.
- Karan Gill as Panfilo, Neifile's social-climbing husband. Cunning, manipulative and always looking for the chance to advance, he prefers the company of men but is nonetheless devoted to his wife.
- Tony Hale as Sirisco, steward of the villa. Loyal and hard-working, he struggles to keep up appearances in the midst of an intense crisis, but his neuroses begin to crack under the pressure.
- Saoirse-Monica Jackson as Misia, Pampinea's charming, optimistic and eternally loyal hand-maiden. A lesbian mourning the loss of her companion Parmena to the plague, her devotion to Pampinea is all she has, and seems to have no bounds.
- Zosia Mamet as Pampinea, a wealthy noblewoman arranged to be married to Leonardo, the owner of the villa. Endlessly vain, spoiled, and temperamental, she is convinced that Leonardo, whom she has never met, is her last chance at true love before she becomes an old maid at 28.
- Douggie McMeekin as Tindaro, the wealthiest guest at the villa, an oafish hypochondriac. Egotistical, naive, and obsessed with the history of warfare, he is distrustful of women but desperate for love.
- Jessica Plummer as Filomena, Leonardo's wealthy cousin, who has lost her entire family to the plague. Self-centered but pragmatic, she will do anything to secure her future.
- Tanya Reynolds as Licisca, Filomena's handmaid. Beaten down by life and cynical about the future, a surprising opportunity allows her to experience freedom for the first time in her life.

=== Recurring ===
- Alfredo Pea as Calandrino, a servant at the villa
- Giampiero de Concilio as Andreoli, a messenger
- Aston Wray as Jacopo, Stratilia's son
- Dustin Demri-Burns as Arriguccio, a friend of Sirisco
- Fares Fares as Ruggiero, a cousin of the viscount
- Tazmyn-May Gebbett as Parmena, Misia's love
- Reis Daniel as Stecchi, Ruggiero's friend
- Logan Wong as Bruno, Ruggiero's friend
- Davy Eduard King as Leonardo, Pampinea's betrothed
- Oleksandr Rudynskyi as Eyeless Bandit
- John Hannah as Eduardo, Filomena's father

== Episodes ==
| No. | Title | Directed by | Written by | Original release date |
|---|---|---|---|---|
| 1 | "The Beautiful, Not-Infected Countryside" | Michael Uppendahl | Kathleen Jordan | July 25, 2024 |
As the Black Plague ravages Florence, several young nobles accept invitations to escape the epidemic in the Visconte Leonardo's countryside estate Villa Santa. Leonardo's narcissistic betrothed Pampinea (who has never met her fiancé) and her servant Misia are greeted by the steward Sirisco, who is trying to hide that Leonardo has passed away and most of the servants have died or fled. Misia has secretly smuggled her lover Parmena, who is infected with plague, into the estate by hiding her in a wine barrel. Leonardo's spoiled cousin Filomena is eager to leave for the villa in hope of finding a match to secure her future, but her maid Licisca refuses to abandon Filomena's dying father Eduardo. Filomena lies to Licisca that Eduardo has died, and the pair depart for the Villa, but after Filomena starts an argument that turns physical, Licisca accidentally pushes her off a bridge into a river. Impulsively, Licisca decides to assume Filomena's identity. Pampinea receives "Filomena" as well as the other guests: the wealthy hypochondriac Tindaro, the fervantly devout Neifile, her social-climbing husband Panfilo, and Tindoro's doctor Dioneo. Both Neifile and Panfilo lust after Dioneo, who flirts with Licisca but is frustrated by Tindaro's interest in her. Jealous, Dioneo gives Tindaro a tea that makes him ill. Pampinea, desperate to marry Leonardo and secure her future, becomes increasingly distraught by his absence. Panfilo deduces that Licisca is actually a servant, and uses this information to ingrain himself with her to gain access to Tindaro's money. Misia discovers Parmena has died of the plague; while disposing of her body she finds Leonardo's corpse, and she and Sirisco make a pact to keep each other's secrets. The group survives an attack by bandits led by Cardinal Agnolo, Neifile's former confessor. He tells the party that the plague is a curse from God and tries to assault Neifile, and Licisca impulsively kills him when it is revealed that he has the plague. The other bandits retreat as a ragged Filomena arrives at the Villa.
| 2 | "Holiday State of Mind" | Michael Uppendahl | Kathleen Jordan | July 25, 2024 |
Filomena furiously attacks Licisca, but Panfilo helps convince the others that Filomena is a jealous and unstable handmaid. Filomena agrees to pretend to be Licisca on the threat of being thrown out of the villa, and begrudgingly is set to work under the stern cook, Stratilia. Neifile, shaken by the cardinal's declaration that God has abandoned humanity, jumps down a well and refuses to come out until God rescues her. Tindaro, assisted by Dioneo, tries to woo "Filomena" with dull history lessons. Pampinea demands to be taken to Leonardo, and Sirisco and Misia privately tell her that Leonardo is dead. The three plot to pretend she has married Leonardo while in town. Panfilo pays Dioneo to retrieve Neifile and claim he was sent by God; Neifile is aroused by the experience. Pampinea announces her marriage to Leonardo, taking control as mistress of the Villa. Angered at Tindaro's pomposity and feeling free for the first time in her life, Licisca visits Dioneo's quarters and they begin an affair.
| 3 | "By Homer, It's a Winner's Wreath!" | Andrew DeYoung | James Rogers III | July 25, 2024 |
Pampinea throws a series of absurd games in honor of her marriage, forcing the guests to participate. Panfilo learns that his family's wealth has been lost, and he tells Neifile they must work to stay in the villa permanently. As Pampinea mourns her "true love" Leonardo, Sirisco seeks to comfort her. They become lovers (as do Panfilo and the messenger Andreoli), but their affair ends some weeks later when she publicly berates him for overstepping his bounds and tells him that she considers him nothing more than a vessel for Leonardo. A humiliated Sirisco begins to plot with Panfilo, who has guessed that Leonardo is dead, to wrest control of the villa from Pampinea. Neifile, overcome with lust, offers herself to Dioneo, but he kindly rejects her since he has fallen in love with Licisca. When Tindaro seems to be making progress with Licisca, Dioneo grows jealous and impulsively poisons Tindaro's drink. Dioneo proposes to Licisca; she rejects him in favor of the financial stability Tindaro offers, but they make love for the last time. Stratilia gives Tindaro an antidote to the poison when she finds him in pain, and he realizes that his illness is a deception of Dioneo, who he secretly observes having sex with Licisca. That night at dinner, Pampinea announces that she is pregnant with Leonardo's child, to Sirisco's shock. Tindaro publicly confronts Dioneo and fires him, and threateningly asks Licisca to marry him.
| 4 | "The Mood is Soiled" | Andrew DeYoung | Anthony Natoli | July 25, 2024 |
Aiming to remove Pampinea, Sirisco and Panfilo invite Leonardo's cousin and heir Ruggiero to the villa, to Stratilia's fury. He arrives accompanied by a crowd of rowdy companions, and offends Pampinea instantly by throwing a lavish feast and carousing incessantly. Dioneo has been exiled from the group, but not from the villa, for his crime, and attempts to gain favor with Licisca and Neifile, in the process revealing that Panfilo paid him to rescue her from the well. Filomena, who has bonded with Misia, attempts to enlist her and Pampinea's help to end Licisca's charade, but Pampinea refuses to believe her. Rejected by Licisca, a self-pitying Tindaro has sex with Stratilia, who treats him like a submissive to his great surprise. He becomes infatuated with her, to her frustration. Ruggiero offends Pampinea by revealing that Leonardo was a notorious womanizer and whoremonger, and he shocks the guests by opening Leonardo's secret parlor, full of pornography and sex toys with a hidden entrance just for prostitutes. Neifile, suffering a crisis of faith, is seduced by Ruggiero, and Panfilo realizes that his plan has backfired. Things boil over when two of Ruggiero's men accidentally kill a member of their party, and Filomena stands up to Ruggiero in defense of Pampinea and is nearly raped before Misia desperately reveals that she is a lady. Licisca confesses the truth to save Filomena's life, but Ruggiero banishes them from the estate for their lie. Sirisco, desperate to destroy Pampinea, reveals that Leonardo has been dead the entire time to the whole party and brings Ruggiero Leonardo's severed head. Angered at the desecration of his cousin's corpse, Ruggiero kicks everyone out of the estate except for Neifile and Dioneo, and the party watches a group of prostitutes, one of whom is visibly ill, enter the villa.
| 5 | "Switcheroo" | Anya Adams | Megan King Kelly | July 25, 2024 |
Panfilo climbs the wall of the estate to sneak back in, but observes Ruggiero and Neifile having intercourse. The morning after, Neifile discovers Ruggiero's friends and the prostitutes dead by the plague, and lets the others back in the Villa. They tie Ruggiero up in his bedroom and discover the body of Dioneo, also killed by the plague. Pampinea and Panfilo both try to ingratiate themselves to Ruggiero to secure property of the Villa, and the latter succeeds, after a heartfelt reconciliation with Neifile, who shows plague blisters on her neck. On their journey back to Firenze, Filomena and Licisca share childhood stories, a night in a cave, and a gruesome experience in a shack, coming to terms with their fractious relationship. Tindaro, mourning the loss of Dioneo, continues his liaison with Stratilia. Sensing Misia is pulling away from her, Pampinea manipulates Misia into her confidence by acknowledging her grief for her lost lover Parmena. After a burial service for Parmena, Pampinea orders Misia to kill Ruggiero for the sake of her unborn child. While grudgingly trying to feed him a poisoned broth, Misia knives him when he jumps her, accidentally killing him. With his dying breath, Ruggiero tells her that he is not the real heir to the villa. Meanwhile, Tindaro discovers that Stratilia has a young son who resembles Leonardo.
| 6 | "A Stony Brook Away" | Anya Adams | Marie Hanhnhon Nguyen | July 25, 2024 |
After Ruggiero’s murder, a shellshocked Misia goes to Sirisco for help but ends up driving him away. Sirisco leaves Villa Santa and meets an old acquaintance, Arriguccio, who invites him to share a meager lunch with his friends. Moved by their selflessness and good nature, Sirisco decides to take Arriguccio’s group with him back to the Villa and create an estate owned by the workers. Tindaro proposes to Stratilia and befriends Jacopo, her illegitimate son with Leonardo. Against Stratilia's wishes, he foolishly takes him to the villa and introduces the boy to Pampinea. Pampinea recognizes his resemblance to Leonardo, realizes he is the true heir to the villa, and locks him away, planning to become his mother and the owner of the villa. When Misia confronts her about this plan, Pampinea admits that she is not pregnant. Panfilo and Neifile share a last blissful day together before she succumbs to the plague in the evening. On their journey, Filomena and Licisca are assaulted by Cardinal Agnolo’s henchmen. They are saved by members of a mercenary army, and bring them to their leader, a nihilistic monk, who sentences them to death after a blunder by Filomena. About to die, she confesses to Licisca that they are half-sisters: Licisca is the result of one of Eduardo’s affairs. They manage to escape by horse and return to the Villa, though Licisca is wounded in the leg during their escape. As they return they discover an increasingly unhinged Pampinea is about to burn Stratilia as a witch for the crime of seducing her "true love" away from her, but is stopped when Sirisco's friends enter the villa. As Tindaro and Filomena attempt to regain control of the situation, a mourning Panfilo watches the chaos.
| 7 | "This is Awful, And You'll Never Recover" | Michael Uppendahl | Zoe Jarman | July 25, 2024 |
Sirisco lets Arriguccio and his friends into the villa, but is more interested in tracking down Pampinea than in letting his starving friends eat. Misia and Filomena reunite and admit their love for each other. Panfilo mourns his wife, coming to terms with all that he has lost and becomes determined to not die pointlessly. Stratilia treats Licisca's wound, declines Tindaro's proposal, and attempts to take Jacopo and leave the nobles behind, but he convinces her to stay and take possession of the estate as rightful heir. Misia and Filomena make love, and Filomena urges Misia to leave Pampinea and return to Florence with her after the plague lifts. Andreoli arrives with the news that the mercenaries are marching on the villa, and Sirisco suggests bribing the army with Pampinea's dowry, a bag of jewels. When Pampinea is tracked down, she claims someone has taken her dowry and refuses to help the others. Misia secretly sneaks the jewels to her before Sirisco turns Pampinea out of the villa. Filomena confesses to Licisca that their father was still alive when they left, and a furious Licisca decides to set out on her own. She discovers Pampinea attempting to swallow her dowry and takes the remaining jewels from her, but is forced to return to the Villa when the mercenaries arrive.
| 8 | "We've Had a Good Cry" | Michael Uppendahl | Kathleen Jordan and Stephen Unckles | July 25, 2024 |
Pampinea lets the mercenaries back into the villa, betraying the group. She agrees to a pact with the general of the mercenaries, getting her dowry back from Licisca in exchange for the villa, but the general renegs and draws his sword to kill them all. Panfilo kills him, but Tindaro is badly wounded in the process, and several of the peasants and servants are killed. Pampinea flees the group, and Tindaro gives the mercenaries her jewels, but the Monk orders the mercenaries to attack anyway. Filomena asks Misia to choose between her and Pampinea, and Misia seems to choose her mistress. Arriguccio attempts to surrender, but is killed, and an enraged Sirisco futilely attempts to burn the villa to the ground. Licisca has the opportunity to escape, but instead chooses to save Filomena from an attacking mercenary. Meanwhile, Misia hides Pampinea in a barrel as she hid Parmena, promising to rescue her after the mercenaries leave. Instead, she sets the cellar on fire, freeing herself from her mistress' control. Tindaro is killed defending Jacopo, and Panfilo sacrifices himself to help the group escape, frightening the superstitious mercenaries with Neifile's plague-ridden body. The mercenaries flee from the plague, leaving the villa empty. The nobles escape into the woods, where the remaining peasants abandon Sirisco. Despite a difficult night sheltering from the rain, the remaining members of the party are able to reach the cave which Licisca and Filomena found on their journey, where the sisters affirm their love for each other. Later, Licisca, Filomena, Stratilia, Jacopo, Misia and Sirisco entertain themselves in an idyllic forest grove, telling stories to pass the time.

== Production ==
In August 2022, Netflix announced that it had ordered a television series loosely inspired by the 14th-century short stories of The Decameron by Giovanni Boccaccio. The series was created by showrunner Kathleen Jordan, and Jenji Kohan would executive produce with Jordan. Michael Uppendahl was set to direct four of the eight episodes. The cast was announced in December 2022, including Zosia Mamet, Saoirse-Monica Jackson, Tanya Reynolds, Amar Chadha-Patel, Leila Farzad, Lou Gala, Karan Gill, Tony Hale, Douggie McMeekin, and Jessica Plummer.

Pre-production for the series began at the end of 2022. Filming began on January 10, 2023, with plans to continue through June. Filming in Rome took place at the Cinecittà Studios, where the interiors of Villa Santa took up Stage 5, with additional portions of the villa utilizing Stage 4 and 11. Additional on-location filming also took place in locations throughout the province of Viterbo, such as the gardens of Castello Ruspoli and having the San Pellegrino quarter serve as 14th-century Florence by covering and hiding modern features such as gutters, cables, windows, and flues. Sets were designed by Luca Tranchino, and costumes were designed by Gabriella Pescucci.

== Reception ==
On the review aggregator website Rotten Tomatoes, 70% of 44 critics' reviews are positive, with an average rating of 6/10. The website's critical consensus states, "A broad spoof of the Black Death teeming with amusing performances, The Decameron's dark streak of humor can border on the flippant but makes for a pretty fun pestilential party." Metacritic gave it a weighted average score of 65 out of 100 based on 23 reviews, indicating "generally favorable reviews".
