= Malia Pyles =

American actress (born 2000)

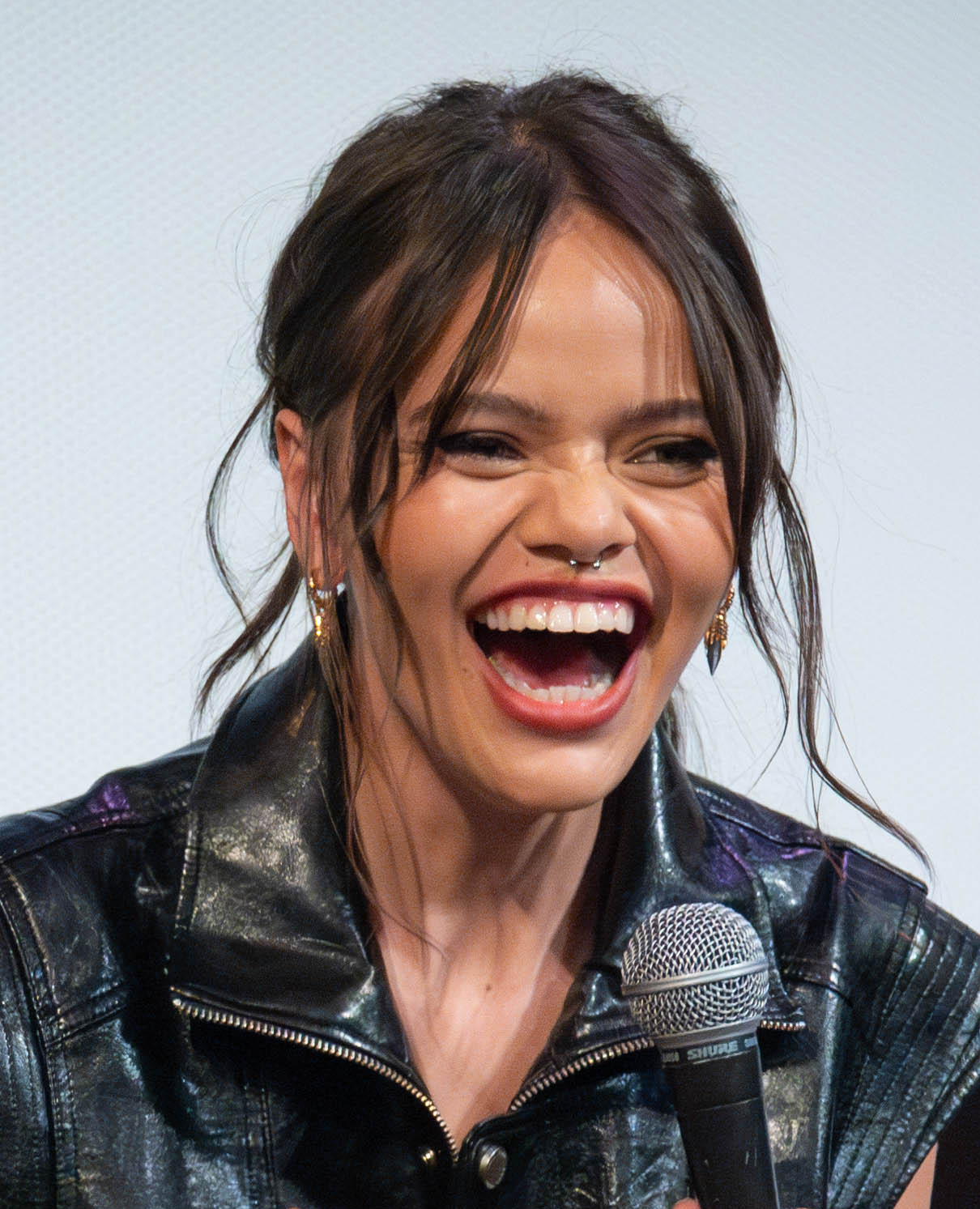
- Pyles in 2024
- Born: Malia Leilani Pyles; July 13, 2000 (age 26); Huntington Beach, California, U.S.
- Occupation: Actress
- Years active: 2011–present

Malia Leilani Pyles (born July 13, 2000) is an American actress. Making her feature film debut in 2015, she gained recognition for her performances in the FX series Baskets (2016–2019) and Max slasher horror series Pretty Little Liars (2022–2024). She went on to star in the Apple TV psychological thriller miniseries Cape Fear (2026).

== Early life and education ==
Malia Leilani Pyles was born on July 13, 2000, in Huntington Beach, California.

Pyles began modeling at age eight for clothing brands and retail store advertisements. She performed in musical theater throughout her grade school years and attended Orange County School of the Arts.

== Career ==
=== 2011–2021: Career beginnings, Baskets, and Batwoman ===
Pyles began acting in short and independent feature film roles. In 2015, she appeared in films such as The Heyday of the Insensitive Bastards and Memoria.

Starting in 2016, Pyles starred in TV shows such as Nickelodeon's Bella and the Bulldogs, ABC's Speechless, The Fosters, and How to Get Away with Murder. In the same year, Pyles landed a recurring role (4 seasons) as Sarah Baskets in the FX comedy series Baskets.

In 2020, Pyles had a recurring guest-star role as Parker Torres in Batwoman.

=== 2022–present: Pretty Little Liars ===
In 2022, Pyles gained international recognition when she began portraying Minnie "Mouse" Honrada, a 15-year-old high school student, in HBO Max's critically acclaimed drama series Pretty Little Liars: Original Sin. In September 2022, the series was renewed for a second season. In October of the same year, the new season was teased under the title Pretty Little Liars: Summer School.

In 2026, Pyles starred in the Apple TV+ series Cape Fear.

== Personal life ==
Pyles identifies as queer.

On October 24, 2022, Pyles officially announced her relationship with Pretty Little Liars co-star Jordan Gonzalez after they appeared in a Halloween photoshoot together.

== Filmography ==
=== Film ===
Year	Title	Role	Notes
2011	Susan's Remembrance	Girl #3	Short film
2012	The Lepidoctor	Student	Short film
2013	No Child Left Deprived	Leslie	Short film
2014	Guests	Handball Girl	Short film
2015	The Heyday of the Insensitive Bastards	Handball Girl	
2015	Memoria	Tasha	
2021	The Soot Man	Katherine	Short film
2021	Conjugal Revivification	Sherry	Short film

=== Television ===
Year	Title	Role	Notes
2014	Scarlett	Kristen	Television debut; 2 episodes: "Friends Don't Let Friends Mix", "The Past Isn't Always the Past
2016	Bella and the Bulldogs	Amanda Jane	1 episode: "Glitz & Grit"
2016–2019	Baskets	Sarah	Recurring role; 11 episodes
2017	Speechless	Prom Queen	1 episode: "P-R-- PROM"
2017	The Fosters	Cherisa	2 episodes: "Resist", "Until Tomorrow"
2017	How to Get Away with Murder	Madison	1 episode: "It's for the Greater Good"
2020	Batwoman	Parker Torres	2 episodes: "A Secret Kept from All the Rest", "How Queer Everything Is Today!"
2022–2024	Pretty Little Liars	Minnie "Mouse" Honrada	Main role
2026	Cape Fear	Nevaeh Valentine	Main role

Key
†	Denotes series or episodes that have not yet been released

=== Voice work ===
Year	Title	Role	Notes	Ref.
2023	Girls Like Girls	SJ		
