= Zakiya Young =

American actress

- Born: March 24, 1979 (age 47); Pennsylvania
- Occupation: Actress
- Years active: 2012–present

Zakiya Young is an American actress. She is best known for playing Corey Bryant in the drama series Pretty Little Liars and for being the first black women to play Supermans love interest Lois Lane.

== Early life ==
Young grew up in Downingtown, Pennsylvania to singer Sidney Young and Barnia Young. She was influenced to become a performer at a young age by her older sister Jamilia who was a talented singer. Young sang in her church choir while attending Downingtown High School. She was a cheerleader in a band and took part in high school productions including West Side Story and Evita. She attended the University of Pittsburgh originally trying to become a doctor but changed her mind and ended up graduating with a BA in communications.

== Career ==
In 2010 Young made history when she became the first black woman ever to play Lois Lane in It's a Bird... It's a Plane... It's Superman at the Dallas Theater Center. She played Sally in the Broadway musical The Lightning Thief at the Lucille Lortel Theatre. She made a one off appearance as Layla in the comedy drama series Orange Is the New Black. Her biggest on screen role of her career so far came playing Corey Bryant in the drama series Pretty Little Liars. She was in the same classroom as Sara Shepard, the writer of the Pretty Little Liars book series.

== Personal life ==
Outside of acting she has gained a large following on her YouTube podcast series called Suburban Black Girl where she discusses various topics such as politics, social justice, current events, dating and religion. From this she created her own show which she performed at the Ojai Playwrights Conference New Works Festival and the La Jolla Playhouse DNA New Works Festival.

== Filmography ==
=== Film ===
Year	Title	Role	Notes
2014	This American Life: One Night Only at BAM	Other Nurse	
2017	Disney Royals	Ursula	
2017	The Vanishing of Sidney Hall	Reporter 2	
2017	Room Enough	Jackie	Short
2019	Cooking Show	Sound Girl	
2021	Authenticity: The Musical	Denise	
2026	Will	Farah Stanton	Short

=== Television ===
Year	Title	Role	Notes
2012	Made in Jersey	Kennedy	Episode; Wingman
2010-2014	Submissions Only	Erica Houston	12 episodes
2015	Orange Is the New Black	Layla	Episode; Trust No Bitch
2016	Mozart in the Jungle	Administrative Assistant	Episode; You're the Best or You F'ing Suck
2017	Iron Fist	Nurse Smith	2 episodes
2022	Little Demon	Kooky Mom, Nun	2 episodes
2024	Diarra from Detroit	Rolexxx	Episode; Fishbones
2022-2024	Pretty Little Liars	Corey Bryant	10 episodes
