= Luca Tranchino =

Italian production designer and art director

Luca Tranchino is an Italian production designer and art director. His film credits, as Production Designer, include movies such as The Legend of Hercules (2014), Unfinished Business (2015), The Ottoman Lieutenant (2017), The Doorman (2020). As Art Director, he has worked on films such as Gangs of New York (2002), Cold Mountain (2003), The Aviator (2004), Casanova (2005), Hugo (2011), To Rome with Love (2012), Seventh Son (2015). In 2011 he has won The ADG Excellence in Production Design Award for a Period Feature Film, for Hugo. In 2016 he has designed Sets for the television drama Prison Break and in 2020 for the Historical TV Series Domina for Sky Atlantic. In 2023 he designed sets for the Netflix TV Series The Decameron, building the main Villa Set on Stage 5, which is the Cinecittà’s biggest, most legendary stage.

== Filmography ==
- 2025 La Dolce Villa - Prod. Designer
- 2024 The Decameron (TV series) - Prod. Designer
- 2022 Domina (TV series), Season 2 - Prod. Designer
- 2021 Domina (TV series), Season 1 - Prod. Designer
- 2020 The Doorman - Prod. Designer
- 2017 Prison Break (TV series), Season 5 - Prod. Designer
- 2017 The Ottoman Lieutenant - Prod. Designer
- 2015 Unfinished Business - Prod. Designer
- 2014 The Legend of Hercules - Prod. Designer
- 2014 Seventh Son - Art Director
- 2013 Prisoners of the Sun - Prod. Designer
- 2013 Third Person - Art Director Supervisor
- 2012 To Rome with Love - Art Director
- 2011 Hugo (Academy Award Winner, ADG Award Winner, BAFTA Award Winner) - Art Director
- 2010 Prince of Persia:The Sands of Time - Art Director
- 2009 The International - Art Director
- 2007 The Hills Have Eyes 2 - Set Decorator
- 2006 The Ten Commandments (TV Mini Series) - Set Decorator
- 2005 Casanova - Art Director
- 2004 The Aviator (Academy Award Winner, ADG Award Nomination, BAFTA Award Winner) - Art Director
- 2003 Cold Mountain (BAFTA Award Nomination) - Art Director
- 2002 Gangs of New York (Academy Award Nomination, ADG Award Nomination, BAFTA Award Nomination) - Art Director
- 1999 Harem Suare - Set Designer
- 1999 Titus - Draftsman
- 1999 The Seventh Scroll (TV Mini Series) - Assistant Art Director
- 1996 Giamaica - Set Designer
- 1995 Cronache del terzo millennio - Set Designer
- 2004 Theatral Opera “Werther” - Set Designer, Bologna Theater
- 2001 Theatral Opera “Orfeo” - Set Designer, Opera Zurich
- 1996 Theatral Opera “Macbeth” - Set Designer, Opera Montecarlo
