= Teenage Bounty Hunters =

2020 American teen dramedy streaming television series

- Genre: Teen comedy-drama
- Created by: Kathleen Jordan
- Showrunner: Robert Sudduth
- Starring: Maddie Phillips; Anjelica Bette Fellini; Kadeem Hardison; Virginia Williams
- Music by: Jonathan Sanford
- Country of origin: United States
- Original language: English
- No. of seasons: 1
- No. of episodes: 10

Production
- Executive producers: Jenji Kohan; Tara Herrmann; Robert Sudduth; Jesse Peretz; Blake McCormick
- Producers: Alex Orr; Arturo Guzman; Aimee Roth
- Cinematography: Michael Berlucchi
- Editors: Amy Fleming; Liza Cardinale; Luis Colina
- Running time: 42–58 minutes
- Production company: Tilted Productions

Original release
- Network: Netflix
- Release: August 14, 2020

Teenage Bounty Hunters is an American teen comedy drama television series created by Kathleen Jordan for Netflix which was released on August 14, 2020. Blake McCormick and Jenji Kohan are executive producers, along with Tara Herrmann and Robert Sudduth serving as showrunner. In October 2020, the series was canceled after one season.

== Premise ==
After denting their father's pickup truck, evangelical high school students and fraternal twins Sterling and Blair Wesley fall into bounty hunting for grizzled bounty hunter Bowser Jenkins in order to pay for the truck's repair, and without their parents' knowledge.

== Cast and characters ==
=== Main ===
- Maddie Phillips as Sterling Wesley, Blair's fraternal twin sister and a student and debater at Willingham Academy who is trying to balance her life as a bounty hunter with being fellowship leader at her Christian high school
- Anjelica Bette Fellini as Blair Wesley, Sterling's more rebellious fraternal twin sister and a lacrosse player who also goes to Willingham Academy and who is also a bounty hunter
- Kadeem Hardison as Bowser Jenkins, a grizzled bounty hunter and mentor to Sterling and Blair, who also runs a frozen yogurt shop named Yogurtopia
- Virginia Williams as Debbie Wesley, the twins' mother

=== Recurring ===
- Spencer House as Luke Creswell, Sterling's boyfriend
- Mackenzie Astin as Anderson Wesley, the twins' father
- Eric Graise as Ezequiel, April's friend
- Wynn Everett as Ellen Johnson, the fellowship teacher at Willingham Academy
- Devon Hales as April Stevens, Sterling's nemesis who is jealous that Sterling is named fellowship leader
- Charity Cervantes as Hannah B., April's friend
- Myles Evans as Miles Taylor, Blair's love interest
- Carolyn Jones Ellis as Cathy, an employee of Yogurtopia
- Cliff "Method Man" Smith as Terrance Coin, a rival bounty hunter to Bowser
- Shirley Rumierk as Yolanda, the owner of Yolanda's Bail Bonds; Bowser's boss and ex-sister-in-law
- Given Sharp as Horny Lorna, a promiscuous student at Willingham Academy
- Jacob Rhodes as Franklin, Luke's golf teammate

== Episodes ==
No.	Title	Directed by	Written by	Original release date
1	"Daddy's Truck"	Jesse Peretz	Kathleen Jordan	August 14, 2020
In Atlanta, fraternal twins Blair and Sterling Wesley are pulled into the world of bounty hunting when they accidentally crash their father’s truck into a car driven by a bail jumper; as they subdue him, bounty hunter Bowser Simmons arrives and mistakes the girls for fellow bounty hunters. As the girls explore the bounty hunting scene further, seeking money to repair the truck, they must also juggle it with their studies at Willingham, a Christian school, boyfriend drama, and their passive-aggressive feud with fellow student April. Sterling becomes her school year's fellowship leader and consummates her relationship with long-time boyfriend Luke, but April stumbles upon evidence (an empty condom wrapper). April's father John Stevens is in hiding after beating up a prostitute; after the twins track down and apprehend Stevens, Bowser allows them to work for him as his 'interns', while also working in his yogurt restaurant as a cover.
2	"What's a Jennings?"	Mark A. Burley	Robert Sudduth	August 14, 2020
The twins and Bowser search for counterfeiter Kenneth Chu, eventually finding him hiding with his grandmother at her retirement home. Intent on having sex with her boyfriend Jennings, Blair uses a relationship quiz to test their compatibility, only to result in them amicably breaking up. April threatens to expose Sterling and Luke's sexual activity to the school unless Sterling relinquishes the position of fellowship leader. Sterling ultimately confesses to everyone and allows April to become fellowship leader.
3	"This Must Be How Dumb Kids Feel"	Andrew DeYoung	Shane Kosakowski	August 14, 2020
The bounty hunters search for Clea Kincaid, an activist who has been decapitating Confederate statues, despite Blair supporting her crusade. Blair reluctantly goes on a date with acquaintance Miles Taylor, only to find herself unexpectedly attracted to him and inadvertently botch their date. Sterling endures gossip and judgement from her peers, and tries to move forwards by getting drunk at a college party she attends with Blair and Miles. While there she has an epiphany that results in the team apprehending Kincaid, though Bowser allows her to behead another statue. The twins' father Anderson quits his job working for his demeaning father, while their mother Debbie punishes Sterling for drinking by making her sleep in a tent in the family's backyard.
4	"Basically Pluto"	Lauren Morelli	Aziza Barnes	August 14, 2020
In an attempt to apprehend a con artist, the twins invite her to Debbie's book club, only for her subordinate John Slack to appear and admit she has fled Atlanta. Debbie hires Miles as valet for the club meeting, leaving Blair embarrassed, but she later discovers his family is even richer than hers: his mother is a state senator, and his father is a banker. Sterling and Luke's sexual activity is inadvertently revealed to both their mothers, who forbid them from seeing each other for a while. The twins discover Bowser was formerly a police officer, but quit due to persistent mockery from his colleagues after he accidentally shot his police horse during a Pride parade.
5	"Death Is Bad"	Rebecca Asher	Zoë Jarman	August 14, 2020
Bowser and the twins attempt to bring in repeat offender Cherry Grigio, a stripper with whom Bowser has a longstanding antagonistic relationship; she tries and fails to seduce him in an escape attempt. During their time apart, Luke becomes more insecure and clingy, while Sterling finds herself missing him less and less. They organise a memorial for solitary substitute teacher Richard Koontz, whose adventurous lifestyle leads Sterling to realise that being alone is not necessarily a bad thing; she breaks up with Luke. Blair becomes convinced Koontz is haunting her, and starts to doubt she is ready to lose her virginity. Miles assures her there is no rush, but they ultimately have sex during a subsequent date.
6	"Master Debater"	Angela Barnes Gomes	Earl Davis	August 14, 2020
Bowser and his employer and longtime friend Yolanda Carrion use a coupon scheme to lure bail skippers; they grow closer throughout the day. Sterling and April participate in an inter-school debate tournament. April digs up scandalous information on other competitors and demands that Sterling, who gets through to the final, publicly humiliate her opponent to win, but Sterling does not go through with it. The ensuing arguments reveal that Sterling impulsively dissolved her friendship with April five years earlier, for which April has resented her ever since. Sterling kisses numerous male students to experiment after her breakup with Luke, but has her first ever orgasm after arguing with April. Suspecting Debbie is being dishonest, Blair spies on her and follows her to a storage locker, where Debbie keeps a large amount of cash and a shotgun.
7	"Cleave or Whatever"	Diego Velasco	Megan King Kelly	August 14, 2020
Bowser and the twins apprehend petty criminal Gary Durbin. Michelle, Bowser's ex-wife and Yolanda's sister, returns and grows close to Bowser again, but he declines to get back together, having realised he has feelings for Yolanda. Blair pesters Anderson with questions about Debbie, resulting in them giving the twins a collection of pictures and keepsakes from Debbie's youth, which she claims she does not discuss due to her grief over her parents' death. Sterling works with April on a school project, and April opens up about her fractured relationship with her father; Sterling eventually kisses her, which, after the initial shock, April reciprocates.
8	"From Basic to Telenovela"	Stephanie Laing	Tara Herrmann	August 14, 2020
Anderson is angry at Debbie over deceiving their children. To find rapper Adam 'Fren-Z' Johanssen, Blair goes undercover as a singer at a recording studio, while Bowser gathers intel on Fren-Z's whereabouts from his manager. At the same time Blair goes on a date with Miles as they have not spent much time together recently, but her running between the two sites and her dishonesty causes Miles to break up with her. She blames Sterling, who was supposed to participate in the mission but instead spent time with April. When Bowser discovers Yolanda has begun dating another bounty hunter, Terrance Coin, he quits working for her.
9	"Our Ham is Good"	Stephen Falk	Jenji Kohan	August 14, 2020
April and Sterling arrange to spend time together at the school's upcoming lock-in; April's father returns, cleared of all charges and seeking reconciliation with her. Investigating the photos from Debbie's childhood, Blair discovers she grew up in the town of Nandina, rather than Savannah as she has always claimed. Sterling feeling guilty about standing up Blair, suggests that they skip school and head to Nandina, where they get into a huge argument. Sterling accuses Blair of always seeking maximum drama and of sabotaging her relationship with Miles, and responds to Blair calling her boring by revealing her relationship with April. Bowser apologises to Yolanda and works with Terrance to apprehend Fren-Z, but abandons Terrance to capture him alone when Blair calls him in tears following the argument with Sterling. The twins' investigation leads them to discover Debbie was apparently a troubled teen and is wanted for arson; Bowser learns this at the same time.
10	"Something Sour Patch"	Nick Sandow	Kathleen Jordan	August 14, 2020
Confronted by her children, Debbie claims she was influenced as a teenager by an extremist Christian cult into setting fire to an abortion clinic. Bowser agrees not to turn Debbie in, but fires the twins, believing they were concealing their mother's crimes from him. Blair visits Miles and professes her love for him, only to learn he has not told his family about her; she cuts off contact with him. April is cold towards Sterling at the lock-in; she later apologises and tells Sterling they cannot be together now that her homophobic father has returned. Debbie's twin sister Dana Culpepper poses as her and collects Sterling from school, but she realises 'Debbie' is an imposter; Dana is the real criminal, and Debbie and Anderson have been reluctantly helping her evade the law, keeping her existence secret from the twins and continuously paying her to stay away. Following clues Sterling leaves for them, Blair, Bowser, Debbie and Anderson pursue Dana and Sterling to a trailer park, where Bowser subdues Dana's boyfriend Levi Yates in a shootout. Sterling is rescued, but as the police approach, Dana reveals that she is Sterling's biological mother.

== Production ==
=== Development ===
The series was originally titled as Slutty Teenage Bounty Hunters, created by Kathleen Jordan, and executive produced by Robert Sudduth, Jenji Kohan, Tara Herrmann, and Blake McCormick. Sudduth also served as the showrunner. The pilot is directed by Jesse Peretz. On July 22, 2020, upon series premiere date announcement, the series was retitled as Teenage Bounty Hunters, dropping the word "slutty". The series premiered on August 14, 2020. The official trailer for the series was released on July 30, 2020. On October 5, 2020, Netflix canceled the series after one season.

=== Casting ===
On June 28, 2019, Maddie Phillips, Anjelica Bette Fellini, Kadeem Hardison, and Virginia Williams had been cast in starring roles. Upon the official trailer announcement, Mackenzie Astin, Method Man, Myles Evans, Spencer House, Devon Hales, Shirley Rumierk were cast in undisclosed capacities.

=== Filming ===
The series was filmed in Atlanta, Georgia from July to October 2019.

== Reception ==
Kristen Baldwin of Entertainment Weekly gave the series a B+ and wrote a review saying, "Brisk and funny, warm and wonderfully oddball, Teenage Bounty Hunters is a binge everyone— except maybe Old Testament God—can get behind." Reviewing the series for The Hollywood Reporter, Inkoo Kang described the series as "winsome and well-crafted" and said, "Teenage Bounty Hunters is propelled by excellent comic performances by Phillips and Fellini, who don't look all that similar but do share a fizzy chemistry, especially in their crackerjack-timed quips and clairvoyant communications."

Review aggregator Rotten Tomatoes reported an approval rating of 93% based on 28 reviews, with an average rating of 7.23/10. The website's critics consensus reads, "Teenage Bounty Hunters has snappy one-liners and style to spare, and though its peculiar premise at times fizzles, it's held together by Maddie Phillips and Anjelica Bette Fellini's killer chemistry." Metacritic gave the series a weighted average score of 72 out of 100 based on 7 reviews, indicating "generally favorable reviews".

The series has been included on many best of 2020 television show lists by critics' including ones published on The New Yorker, The New York Times, and Vulture.

Vulture included Teenage Bounty Hunters on its list on "The Best Overlooked 2020 TV Series". Kathryn VanArendonk praised the show, writing, "It’s snappy and smart, full of sharp twists and emotional revelations but always true to its primary duo, twin sisters Sterling (Maddie Phillips) and Blair (Anjelica Bette Fellini), and their long-suffering bounty-hunter mentor, Bowser (Kadeem Hardison). It has an immediately distinctive voice that supports rather than distracts from the twisty plotting, something mystery shows always aim for and so, so rarely achieve. It’s so funny, and so legitimately fantastic."
