= Fernando Líndez =

Spanish actor and model (born 2000)

- Líndez at the 2026 Málaga Film Festival
- Born: Fernando María Giménez-Guervòs Líndez; March 16, 2000 (age 26); Madrid, Spain
- Occupations: Actor; model
- Years active: 2018–present
- Known for: Skam España; Élite; The Last Sunrise
- Height: 6 ft 2 in (1.88 m)

Fernando María Giménez-Guervòs Líndez (born March 16, 2000) is a Spanish actor and model, known for his roles in Skam España, Élite and The Last Sunrise.

== Career ==
Born in Madrid, Líndez began working in 2018 after being discovered by a talent scout through Instagram for the casting of Skam España. After being selected, Líndez appeared in all four seasons of the series, playing Alejandro. Líndez has also taken part in fashion shows in New York City, Paris, and London. In 2019, Líndez starred in the music video for the song "Nada sale mal" by Aitana.

In 2022, it was announced that Líndez would star in the series Escándalo. Relato de una obsesión alongside Alexandra Jiménez for Telecinco, where he plays Hugo Ribó, a young man who falls in love with a much older woman.

In 2023, Líndez participated in the Versace fashion show in Milan. That same year, it was announced that he would join the seventh season of Élite for Netflix, remaining through its eighth and final season as Joel Castellano.

In 2025, the film Tell Me Softly, based on the first novel of the Dímelo trilogy by author Mercedes Ron, premiered on Prime Video. In it, Líndez plays Thiago Di Bianco, one of the brothers who has a leading role in the trilogy.

In 2026, Líndez starred in the film adaptation of The Last Sunrise. The film was released on Amazon Prime Video on August 26.

== Personal life ==
Between 2021 and 2023, Líndez was in a relationship with Spanish model Eugenia Arranz. Since at least October 2025, he has been dating Spanish actress and model Ainhoa Larretxi.

== Filmography ==
=== Television ===
Years	Title	Role	Notes
2018–2020	Skam España	Alejandro Beltrán	30 episodes (recurring)
2023	Escándalo. Relato de una obsesión	Hugo Ribó Ferrer	Main role; 8 episodes
2023–2024	Élite	Joel Castellano Soler	Main cast; 16 episodes (seasons 7–8)

=== Film ===
Years	Title	Role
2025	Tell Me Softly	Thiago Di Bianco
2026	The Last Sunrise	Julián García
2027	Tell Me in Secret	Thiago Di Bianco

=== Music videos ===
Years	Title	Artist
2019	"Nada sale mal"	Aitana
