= One Fast Move =

2024 film by Kelly Blatz

- Release poster
- Directed by: Kelly Blatz
- Written by: Kelly Blatz
- Produced by: Mike Karz; Bill Bindley
- Starring: KJ Apa; Eric Dane; Maia Reficco; Edward James Olmos; Austin North
- Cinematography: Luca Del Puppo
- Edited by: Seth Clark
- Music by: Nami Melumad
- Production companies: Gulfstream Pictures; Luber Roklin Entertainment
- Distributed by: Amazon MGM Studios
- Release date: August 8, 2024
- Running time: 108 minutes
- Country: United States
- Language: English

One Fast Move is a 2024 American action film written and directed by Kelly Blatz and starring KJ Apa, Eric Dane, Maia Reficco, Edward James Olmos, and Austin North.

== Cast ==
- KJ Apa as Wes Neal
- Eric Dane as Dean Miller
- Maia Reficco as Camila
- Edward James Olmos as Abel
- Austin North as Cody Farrell
- Jackson Hurst as Bobby Tresco

== Production ==
On June 21, 2022, it was announced that Apa was cast in the film. On June 28, 2022, it was announced that Dane was cast and that filming began in Atlanta. In August 2022, it was announced that Reficco, Olmos and North were added to the cast.

== Release ==
One Fast Move was released in the United States by Amazon MGM Studios on August 8, 2024.

== Reception ==
The film has a 60% rating on Rotten Tomatoes based on 20 reviews.
