= Kathleen Jordan =

American television writer

Kathleen Jordan is an American television writer and showrunner known for creating the Netflix series "Teenage Bounty Hunters" and "The Decameron". She is the daughter of Hamilton Jordan, who served as Chief of Staff to President Jimmy Carter.

== Early life and education ==
Jordan grew up in Buckhead, a conservative area of Atlanta, Georgia, in what she has described as a "liberal, Democratic family." She attended a Christian preparatory high school called Westminster, an experience that would later influence her creative work, particularly "Teenage Bounty Hunters." During her high school years, she felt that she didn't quite fit in with the conservative environment, which informed the themes she would later explore in her writing.

== Career ==
=== Teenage Bounty Hunters ===
Jordan created the Netflix series "Teenage Bounty Hunters," which drew heavily from her personal experiences growing up in Atlanta. The series explores the intersection of conservative Christian values and teenage sexuality, themes Jordan has cited as being inspired by her own upbringing. In interviews, she has mentioned that the character Blair is based on her own teenage insecurities, fantasies, and desires for how she wished she had acted at her Christian preparatory high school.

When discussing the show's approach to religion and sexuality, Jordan has stated: "Religion and sex are so much more complicated than the binary ways that we think about how they intersect." She emphasized the importance of treating religious themes with respect while not "pulling any punches," noting that she aimed for the show to be "open-minded and agnostic about religion."

=== The Decameron ===
Jordan created and served as showrunner for the Netflix series "The Decameron," a series inspired by Giovanni Boccaccio's 14th-century collection of novellas of the same name. She developed the show during the COVID-19 pandemic while eight months pregnant, finding parallels between the historical bubonic plague setting and modern pandemic experiences.

In interviews, Jordan has mentioned that she was drawn to The Decameron as source material because it offered an opportunity to process collective pandemic experiences with "ironic distance." She had previously read The Canterbury Tales in high school and revisited Boccaccio's The Decameron during the COVID-19 pandemic. Jordan has described taking "the armature of the text" while reimagining "what really would happen if a bunch of wealthy people thought that money was going to save them from Death."

While the show draws inspiration from Boccaccio's work, Jordan has clarified that the similarities are primarily in "the germination and the structure of the concept and the spirit of the show."

=== Other projects ===
In January 2025, Jordan signed a two-year overall deal with HBO and its streaming service. While she was reportedly one of the finalists considered to lead HBO's "Harry Potter" series, she ultimately was not selected for that project but continues to develop other projects with Warner Bros. Discovery.

== Personal life ==
Jordan is the daughter of Hamilton Jordan, who served as White House Chief of Staff during Jimmy Carter's presidency. She completed her father's unfinished memoir, Boy From Georgia: Coming of Age In The Segregated South, which was published posthumously.

As of 2024, Jordan lives in Los Angeles, California. She wrote "The Decameron" while eight months pregnant during the COVID-19 pandemic.

== Filmography ==
Year	Title	Role	Notes
2024	The Decameron	Creator, Writer, Showrunner	Netflix miniseries
2020	Teenage Bounty Hunters	Creator, Writer, Producer	Netflix series
2019	American Princess	Writer	TV series
2015	Threesome	Writer	TV series
2015	Pacific Warriors	Associate Producer	TV series
2015	The Prancing Elites Project	Associate Producer	TV series
