= Maddie Phillips =

Canadian actress (born 1994)

- Born: Madelaine Rachel Phillips; September 6, 1994 (age 32); Vancouver, British Columbia, Canada
- Occupation: Actress
- Years active: 2013–present

Madelaine Rachel Phillips (born September 6, 1994) is a Canadian actress. She portrayed Randeen in Ghost Wars, Devon D'Marco in Project Mc2, Sterling Wesley in the 2020 Netflix teen comedy-drama television series Teenage Bounty Hunters, and Cate Dunlap in the Amazon Prime Video superhero series Gen V (2023-2025) and The Boys (2024).

== Early life ==
Madelaine Phillips was born in Vancouver, British Columbia, Canada, to a Canadian father and a mother from Perth, Australia. She decided on an acting career at the age of six. Phillips' family moved to Perth, Australia, when Phillips was 10 and back to Vancouver Canada in 2012. She attended the Uniting Church girls-only school of Penrhos College, Perth.

== Career ==
Phillips' debut on-screen appearance was in the 2013 film If I Had Wings. In 2014, she was lead actress in the short film Antoinette. In 2016, Phillips starred as Sugar in the short film Victory Square.

In 2015, she starred in an episode of Supernatural. Phillips' first recurring role came as Devon D'Marco in the Netflix television series Project Mc2 in 2017; the same year, she played Girl Alex in two episodes of season 1 of the television series Hit the Road and starred as Cassandra in the Mockumentary short film The Roommate, which was featured at the International Canadian Comedy Film Festival.

In 2018, Phillips landed a recurring role as Randeen in five episodes of Ghost Wars. She made appearances as Kit in 2 episodes of the Syfy fantasy horror drama television series Van Helsing in 2018. The same year, she starred in another episode of Supernatural, and appeared as a supermarket elf in the Christmas TV movie Santa's Boots.

Phillips was cast in a main role as Sterling Wesley in the 2020 Netflix teen comedy-drama television series Teenage Bounty Hunters, alongside Anjelica Bette Fellini, who plays her twin sister. In 2022 she was cast in an Amazon Original spin-off of The Boys, titled Gen V. She reprised the role as a minor character in the fourth season of The Boys.

== Filmography ==
=== Film ===
Year	Title	Role	Notes
2013	If I Had Wings	Amy's Cheerleader Friend	
2014	Antoinette	Antoinette	Short Film
2014	Nightwing: Prodigal	Harley Quinn	
2016	Victory Square	Sugar	Short Film
2016	Considering Love and Other Magic	Jessie	
2017	The Roommate	Cassandra	Short Film
2019	Two/One	Registration Assistant	
2019	A Cinderella Story: Christmas Wish	Skylar	Direct-to-video film
2020	Summerland	Stacey	Direct-to-video film
2020	Shared Bath	Jen	Short film
2021	Four Walls	Julie	Director - Darcy Touhey
2026	Breeder	Ainsley	Post-production

=== Television ===
Year	Title	Role	Notes
2015	iZombie	Kidnapped Girl #2	Episode: "Maternity Liv"
2015	Backstrom	Lacy Siddon	Episode: "Bogeyman"
2015	Signed, Sealed, Delivered: Truth Be Told	Trainee #1	Television film
2015	Signed, Sealed, Delivered: From Paris with Love	Trainee #1	Television film
2015, 2018	Supernatural	Janet Novoselic / Harper Sayles	2 episodes
2016	Lucifer	Waitress	Episode: "Pops"
2016	Garage Sale Mystery: Guilty Until Proven Innocent	Waitress	Television film
2017–2018	Ghost Wars	Randeen	Recurring role, 5 episodes
2017	Legion	Jr. Prom Date (Crying)	Episode: "Chapter 1"
2017	Hit the Road	Girl Alex	2 episodes
2017	Project Mc2	Devon D'Marco	Recurring role (Part 5), 5 episodes
2017	Woman of the House	Violet	Television film
2017	Story of a Girl	Corvette Kelly	Television film
2018	Loudermilk	Barista	Episode: "Everybody's Got Something to Hide Except for Me and My Monkey"
2018	The Crossing	Holly	Episode: Pilot
2018	Van Helsing	Kit	2 episodes
2018	Santa's Boots	Cara	Television film
2019	The InBetween	Receptionist	Episode: "The Length of a River"
2019	The Detour	Xander	Episode: "The Year"
2019	Garage Sale Mystery: Searched & Seized	Adele Hall	Television film
2019	Undercover Cheerleader	Kara	Television film
2019	Made for You, with Love	Katie	Television film
2019	A Feeling of Home	Janet	Television film
2020	Teenage Bounty Hunters	Sterling Wesley	Main role - 10 episodes
2023–2025	Gen V	Cate Dunlap	Main role
2024	The Boys	Cate Dunlap	2 episodes
2025	Overcompensating	Gigi	Episode: "Lucky"
2027	Meatballs	Skipper	

=== Music videos ===
Year	Title	Artist	Role
2016	"Comfortable"	Hawking	Main female
2020	"Sleepin’"	Noble Son	Main female
2024	"Slowly Fading’"	Diamond Cafe	Main female
