= The Last Sunrise =

American drama film

- Release poster
- Directed by: Carlson Young
- Screenplay by: Anna Klassen
- Based on: The Last Sunrise by Anna Todd
- Produced by: Anna Todd; Jennifer Gibgot; Andrew Panay; Lena Roklin; Brian Pitt
- Starring: Maia Reficco; Fernando Líndez; Eva Longoria; Chloé Sweetlove; Andrés Velencoso; Sabrina Bartlett; Stefanie Martini; Alex Peracaula
- Cinematography: Rob Givens
- Edited by: Julia Wong
- Music by: Isom Innis
- Production companies: Luber Roklin Entertainment; Pitt Street Productions; Ethea Entertainment
- Distributed by: Amazon MGM Studios (via Prime Video)
- Release date: August 26, 2026
- Running time: 107 minutes
- Country: United States
- Language: English

The Last Sunrise is a 2026 American romantic drama film adapted from the 2025 novel of the same name by Anna Todd. It is directed by Carlson Young for Amazon MGM Studios, with a cast led by Maia Reficco, Fernando Líndez, Eva Longoria and Chloé Sweetlove.

Young Texan Ry Pera, a professional dancer suffering from epilepsy, travels with her mother to her native island of Mallorca where she unexpectedly finds romance with the charismatic local Julian Garcia, causing her to rethink her life plan.

The film was released on Amazon Prime Video on August 26, 2026, and received mixed-to-negative film critic reviews.

== Plot ==
Houston-based, 20-something professional dancer Oriah "Ry" Pera collapses during a performance. Her mother Isolde rushes her to the hospital. Ry suffers from Tuberous Sclerosis Complex (TSC) which has caused her to develop epilepsy, and both the doctors and Isolde urge her to consider having an operation to remove the cortical tubers in her brain. Fearful of the surgery, which could cause significant memory loss and other problems, she prefers to simply medicate and is given medication which must be taken several times a day.

Ry's overprotective mother's work takes them to Mallorca. On their private jet flight, Isolde reminds Ry how important not forgetting her medication is, and that alcohol and drugs would counteract it. Ry laments its side effects which include feeling numb to the world and being unable to have any fun.

Arriving at the hotel, Ry meets hotel receptionist Amara, who is her age and very friendly. Her new friend gushes about the island's possibilities, including the attractive locals. The next day, Isolde is busy all day and suggests Ry go to the beach. Amara happily suggests a little-known secluded beach. When Ry arrives, she soon realizes it is a nude beach. A young man approaches her after a bit, making her feel uncomfortable, so she leaves.

Wandering around looking for a phone charger, she bumps into the guy from the beach who offers to help her return to the hotel. Upon arriving, he points out the grass at the hotel is treated with chemicals that pollute the water, which is a problem for local fishermen.

Ry goes clubbing with Amara and her friends, including Julian Garcia, the local she met on the beach. She decides to go off her meds beforehand. After several shots, and Ry almost passing out, Julian takes her for a ride on a moped. They walk along the shore, sharing about themselves. He is a fisherman and his profession is struggling due to tourism, she mentions being a dancer. Ry and Julian go into the water and kiss before he returns her to the hotel. Afterwards, Julian's loan sharks rough him up.

Ry is upset Julian had not called her the next day, so when she sees him in the evening she sings a rejection karaoke song. Later, he follows her to explain he fears the loan sharks could hurt her. As Ry mentions she will not be on the island for long, they spend the next few days together.

Spending the day on the Garcias' fishing boat, Ry helps them fish. Julian cooks up a little of what they caught and later, they make love in his cabin. The next day Ry spots Mateo Garcia's name in her mother's paperwork for the property project. She explains she knows the Garcias after her day on the fishing boat and begs Isolde to not take away their livelihood.

The loan sharks burn the fishing boat, so Mateo signs over his docks. Ry finally reveals to Julian that her mother works for the company behind all this. Upset, he tells her to leave. Ry is miserable, but Amara insists he will come around. Ry goes to the gala with Isolde but leaves shortly after.

Ry is confronted and threatened by the loan shark, but Julian comes to her aid. He forgives her and accompanies her to the gala fundraiser for the Arts Center, a PR exercise undertaken by Isolde to bolster local support for her project. Ry introduces Julian to her mother. Soon after, Mateo greets Isolde, who was apparently her first love.

Ry spends the night with Julian and they wake up for her to see her first sunrise. She returns to the hotel, where Isolde has discovered Ry has not been taking her medication. Isolde wants them to leave immediately, but Ry refuses, storms out and loses consciousness.

When Ry wakes at the hospital, the doctors once again strongly recommend surgery. Isolde explains Ry never wanted the operation for fear of losing her memory. Julian reassures Ry that surgery is the best option for her future.

After the operation, Ry's memories are gone but, staying in Mallorca she slowly recovers them as well as making new ones. Isolde receives Mateo's old letters thanks to Julian. She in turn reveals she will build the new hotel elsewhere and is investing in the Garcias' fishing business.

== Cast ==
- Maia Reficco as Oriah "Ry" Pera
- Fernando Líndez as Juliàn García
- Eva Longoria as Isolde Pera
- Chloé Sweetlove as Amara
- Andrés Velencoso as Mateo García
- Sabrina Bartlett as Prisha
- Stefanie Martini as Lena
- Alex Peracaula as Carlos

== Production ==
The film is from Amazon MGM Studios and is directed by Carlson Young from a script by Anna Klassen adapted from the 2025 novel of the same name by Anna Todd. Todd is listed as a producer alongside Jennifer Gibgot and Andrew Panay of Ethea Entertainment, Lena Roklin of Luber Roklin Entertainment, and Brian Pitt of Pitt Street Productions.

The cast includes Maia Reficco, Fernando Lindez and Eva Longoria, as well as Andrés Velencoso and Chloé Sweetlove.

Principal photography took place in Sa Fortaleza de Pollença, Mallorca, in August 2025.

Isom Innis, a frequent collaborator of Young, composed the score for the film.

== Release ==
The Last Sunrise was released on Amazon Prime Video on August 26, 2026.
