= La Dolce Villa =

2025 film by Mark Waters

- Release poster
- Directed by: Mark Waters
- Written by: Elizabeth Hackett; Hilary Galanoy
- Produced by: Robyn Snyder; Deborah Evans; Nicola Rosada
- Starring: Scott Foley; Violante Placido; Maia Reficco; Giuseppe Futia
- Cinematography: Theo van de Sande
- Edited by: Travis Sittard
- Music by: Caroline Ho
- Production companies: DAE Light Media; Front Row Films
- Distributed by: Netflix
- Release date: February 13, 2025
- Running time: 99 minutes
- Country: United States
- Language: English

La Dolce Villa (The Sweet Villa) is a 2025 American romantic comedy film directed by Mark Waters. It stars Scott Foley, Violante Placido and Maia Reficco. It was released on Netflix on February 13, 2025.

Its title is an homage to the 1960 neosurrealist satirical film La Dolce Vita, directed by Federico Fellini.

== Plot ==
Fifty-something American widower Eric Field is an Ohio business owner, who returns to Italy to find his 24-year-old daughter Liv (Olivia), despite having bad experiences there in the past. He hopes to stop her from blowing her inheritance on rebuilding a villa. Eric has taken time off now for the first time in years from his restaurant support company Main Course Consulting, out of concern that Liv is possibly jeopardizing her future.

On their way to seeing potential properties, they talk about what Liv has been doing while in Italy. She tutored English in Milan, nannied in Florence, worked harvesting olives, then accidentally found the village of Montezara while seeking a wine festival. Eric and Liv go for a coffee, meeting up with the town mayor Francesca.

The 1-euro housing plan is a new economic plan implanted in remote parts of the country, such as the village of Montezara. They are selling abandoned heritage villas “as is” for one Euro to attract new blood to the community. The three officially available properties do not appeal to the Fields, but a fourth one, which is not yet officially available, does.

There, Liv reveals that Eric had been a trained chef. After agreeing to purchase the last house, he contacts Zola at his company to inform her he will stay in Italy for a month. Eric assures her he can manage remotely.

In the evening, as he is finding basic dinner, Eric bumps into Francesca and Bernardo, the geometra or surveyor whose job is to oversee any construction projects. Once Eric leaves, he expresses his concern with non-Italians purchasing property there. As Francesca hopes this first 1-euro housing plan will help revitalize the town, she begs him to support it.

The next day, the general contractor Nino comes. He initially says he can get the plans approved in six months, but Francesca convinces him to let them start straight away. As the house progresses, Eric continues to try and take over, but Liv stands her ground. They uncover beautiful brick floors as well as an authentic brick pizza oven and chimney. As Eric is helping Nino remove old pipes, he learns Francesca is also widowed since five years ago, two years longer than him.

Liv insists Eric leave, as he has now been a month, she gives him a check for the 5,000 initial investment and they go to dinner. Giovanni is the local chef whose constant advances she regularly rejects. Eric invites everyone, including Francesca and Bernardo, to pitch the idea to open up and expand the kitchen to transform the villa into a culinary school, which could boost the local economy. Eric asks Giovanni to participate, then encourages Liv to consider him, as he is vastly more promising than her past relationships.

Eric and Francesca cycle into the countryside to see an old castle which had been renovated and converted into a luxury hotel. After a picnic, before they can connect, she is called into a meeting. As Francesca drops Eric off, she insists they maintain a professional relationship.

Once Eric has been in Montezara two months, Zola warns him their competition Perfect Plate is trying to poach her. Soon after, Liv divulges that Nino helped her get a year-long interior design apprenticeship in Rome, and that he has started to see Francesca. Then Bernardo sees Eric and her together, which angers him.

Francesca has gotten the Fields' building rezoned without Bernardo's help. At the unveiling of the restored fresco for the soon to be culinary school, Bernando brings the American Longos, who he claims are the heirs, the rightful owners of the villa. The man's ancestor Leoni is from the town. Eric eventually offers the couple the villa if they pay for the renovations.

Eric heads to the train station just as Francesca and a team of locals discover the Longos are descendants of the Leones, a different family, who are connected to another of the abandoned houses. She catches up to him and they declare their love. Months later, after the two Ohio restaurant consulting firms have merged, all celebrate the culinary school's success in Montezara.

== Cast ==
- Scott Foley as Eric
- Violante Placido as Francesca
- Maia Reficco as Olivia
- Giuseppe Futia as Giovanni
- Simone Luglio as Nino
- Jenny De Nucci as Donata

== Production ==
Production began in early 2024. Filming took place in Rome, eastern Lazio, and Tuscany. The villa's interiors were constructed at Cinecittà Studios. Sets were designed by Luca Tranchino, and costumes were designed by Catherine Buyse Dian.

== Release ==
The film's trailer was released on January 22, 2025. The film was released on Netflix on February 13, 2025.

== Reception ==
On the review aggregator website Rotten Tomatoes, 75% of 12 critics' reviews are positive, with an average rating of 5.1/10. Metacritic, which uses a weighted average, assigned the film a score of 44 out of 100, based on 4 critics, indicating "mixed or average" reviews.

== Viewership ==
According to data from Showlabs, La Dolce Villa ranked fourth on Netflix in the United States during the week of 10–16 February 2025.
