= The Crow Girl =

British television series

- Genre: Crime thriller
- Created by: Milly Thomas
- Based on: The Crow Girl by Erik Axl Sund
- Directed by: Charles Martin; Rebecca Rycroft
- Starring: Eve Myles; Katherine Kelly; Clara Rugaard; Victoria Hamilton; Dougray Scott
- Composer: Adam Price
- Country of origin: United Kingdom
- Original language: English
- No. of series: 2
- No. of episodes: 12

Production
- Executive producers: Tony Wood; Richard Tulk-Hart; Slash; Milly Thomas; Federico Ambrosini; Niclas Salomonsson; Erik Axl Sund; Eve Myles
- Producers: Andy Mosse; Debs Pisani
- Production companies: ITV Studios; Buccaneer Media

Original release
- Network: Paramount+
- Release: 16 January 2025 – present

The Crow Girl is a television series based on the Crow Girl book series by Erik Axl Sund, adapted by Milly Thomas for Paramount+. The first series was released in its entirety on 16 January 2025. A second season was released on 20 July 2026.

== Premise ==
DCI Jeanette Kilburn and eminent psychotherapist Dr Sophia Craven join forces to hunt the killer of young men. The investigation takes Jeanette and Sophia into a dangerous world of historic abuse and murder.

== Cast and characters ==
=== Main ===
- Eve Myles as DCI Jeanette Kilburn
- Katherine Kelly as Dr Sophia Craven
- Clara Rugaard as Victoria Burkeman
- Elliot Edusah as DC Mike Dilliston
- Victoria Hamilton as Superintendent/CS Verity Pound
- Roger Nsengiyumva as Amar
- Trevor White as Carl Lowry
- Lu Corfield as Eva Andric
- Raphael Sowole as Alex Kilburn
- Karen Ascoe as Mary Burkeman
- Michael Lumsden as Ben Burkeman
- Dougray Scott as DI Lou Stanley (series 1)
- Zoe Telford as Catherine Stirling / Harriet (series 2)
- Ellie Beaven as Eleanor Lowry (series 2)
- Richard Lintern as Piers Stirling (series 2)

=== Supporting ===
- Chloé Sweetlove as Madeleine Burkeman (series 1)
- Lauren Morais as Charlie (series 1)
- Ashling O'Shea as Ursula Wilson (series 1)
- Basel Osman as Jamal (series 1)
- Thomas Coombes as Steve Cooper (series 1)
- Isabella Astbury as Young Victoria
- Lee Boardman as David White

== Episodes ==
Series	Episodes	Originally released
1	6	16 January 2025
2	6	20 July 2026

=== Series 1 (2025) ===
No. overall	No. in series	Episode	Directed by	Written by	Original release date
1	1	"She Sees Herself from Above"	Charles Martin	Milly Thomas	16 January 2025
DCI Jeanette Kilburn hunts a killer, leading her to Dr Sophia Craven.
2	2	"The Egg She Wishes to Crack"	Charles Martin	Milly Thomas	16 January 2025
Another body gives Jeanette new leads, while Sophia is haunted by a patient.
3	3	"She Wishes to Believe"	Charles Martin	Laura Lomas	16 January 2025
Jeanette comes under fire. Madeleine is in danger as Victoria gets closer.
4	4	"The Dirt She Can't Bury"	Rebecca Rycroft	Lydia Mulvey and Milly Thomas	16 January 2025
A cold case shifts Jeanette's focus, as Sophia gets some distressing news.
5	5	"She Shoots for the King"	Rebecca Rycroft	E.V. Crowe	16 January 2025
Jeanette and Sophia dig into Victoria's past. Madeleine plans her escape.
6	6	"I'll See You There"	Rebecca Rycroft	Milly Thomas	16 January 2025
Jeanette turns to Sophia as her world begins to crumble. Victoria seeks revenge.

=== Series 2 (2026) ===
No. overall	No. in series	Episode	Directed by	Written by	Original release date
7	1	"We Are Many"	Charles Martin	Milly Thomas	20 July 2026
8	2	"Amor Fati"	Charles Martin	Milly Thomas	20 July 2026
9	3	"Into The Light"	Charles Martin	E.V. Crowe	20 July 2026
10	4	"Divide and Conquer"	Rebecca Rycroft	Milly Thomas	21 July 2026
11	5	"Swan Song"	Rebecca Rycroft	E.V. Crowe	20 July 2026
12	6	"Alma Mater"	Rebecca Rycroft	Milly Thomas	20 July 2026

== Production ==
=== Development ===
The book series by Erik Axl Sund, the pen name of Swedish author duo Jerker Eriksson and Håkan Sundquist, was optioned by ITV Studios and Tomorrow Studios in 2014.

In 2023, an adaptation by E.V. Crowe for Paramount+ with executive producers Tony Wood and Richard Tulk-Hart, under the banner of Buccaneer Media began to move forward. Milly Thomas adapted the book for the series. Charles Martin and Rebecca Rycroft are directors with Andy Mosse serving as producer.

In March 2024, Katherine Kelly, Dougray Scott and Eve Myles were cast in lead roles. The cast also includes Lee Boardman, Victoria Hamilton and Clara Rugaard. Filming began in Bristol in March 2024. Filming locations include the city's Castle Park and Wine Street. Filming also took place in Brean, Somerset.

In April 2024, guitarist Slash, a huge fan of the original novel who helped bring it to Buccaneer Media for the adaptation, joined the series as an executive producer and a contributor to the series's soundtrack alongside composer Adam Price.

== Release ==
The first series became available on Paramount+ on 16 January 2025. It aired on Virgin Media One in Ireland for free, starting 14 May 2026.

In the United States, it became available on Acorn TV on 8 September 2025.

The second series premiered on Paramount+ on 20 July 2026.

== Reception ==
On the review aggregator website Rotten Tomatoes, 88% of 8 critics' reviews (series 1) are positive.

Vicky Jessop for the Evening Standard gave the show four out of five, and praised the performance of Myles who found "levity in a show that often feels mired in darkness, but never fails to be anything less than compelling". Lucy Mangan in The Guardian also gave the show four out of five and described it as "a very well-made, pacy drama" with an "overall confidence, style and authenticity". Ed Power in The Independent also gave the series four out of five and praised the performance of Myles and the soundtrack which he described as "understated and spooky" and "the perfect accompaniment to a thriller illuminated by the reliably likeable Myles but not afraid to get much darker than the average streaming whodunit".
