= Maia Reficco =

American-Argentine actress (born 2000)

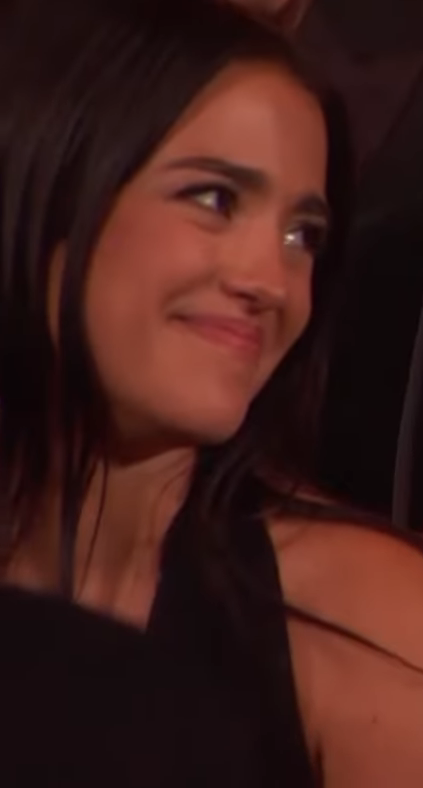
- Reficco at the 78th Tony Awards in 2025
- Born: July 14, 2000 (age 26); Boston, Massachusetts, U.S.
- Citizenship: Argentina; United States
- Occupations: Actress; singer
- Years active: 2017–present
- Partner: Franco Colapinto (2026)
- Musical career
- Genres: Pop; Latin pop; R&B
- Instrument: Vocals
- Label: Interscope Records

Maia Reficco (born July 14, 2000) is an American and Argentine actress and singer. She gained recognition for her portrayals of the title character in the Nickelodeon Latin America musical telenovela Kally's Mashup (2017–2019) and Noa Olivar in the HBO Max horror thriller series Pretty Little Liars (2022–2024), the fourth series in the franchise of the same name. She also acted in the films Do Revenge (2022), One Fast Move (2024) and La Dolce Villa (2025).

In 2024, Reficco made her Broadway stage debut as Eurydice in Hadestown opposite Jordan Fisher.

== Early life ==
Reficco was born in Boston, Massachusetts, and at the age of four, she moved to Buenos Aires, Argentina, with her family of Argentine origin. From a young age, she showed interest in music, singing and playing the guitar, piano, saxophone and ukulele. Her mother Katie Viqueira is a singer and singing teacher, and is the director of her own Center for Vocal Art. Her father Ezequiel Reficco is a professor at the University of Los Andes in Bogotá. She has a younger brother, Joaquín Reficco Viqueira, who is also a singer. Reficco did acrobatics for 11 years. At the age of 15, she traveled to Los Angeles. She lived with Claudia Brant, where she had the opportunity to study singing with Eric Vetro, a vocal coach for artists such as Ariana Grande, Camila Cabello and Shawn Mendes. She also attended a five-week program at Berklee College of Music in Boston in which she excelled, earning a scholarship.

== Career ==
She came to the Nickelodeon Latin America project Kally's Mashup thanks to Claudia Brant and the Instagram social network; Brant was the one who was in charge of sending the covers that Reficco made of different artists and uploaded to the platform, then she was contacted by the production of the series for an audition. Reficco auditioned with the Ariana Grande song "Dangerous Woman". She managed to get the leading role in the series playing Kally Ponce. Reficco signed with the record company Deep Well Records and traveled to Miami to record music for the series. On October 19, 2017, Reficco appeared for the first time at the Kids' Choice Awards Argentina presenting the theme song for the series "Key of Life".

In August 2018, Reficco performed at the Kids' Choice Awards Mexico, where she sang the songs "World's Collide" and "Unísono" with the cast of Kally's Mashup. The same month, in an interview with Billboard Argentina, Reficco confirmed that she was working on her record material as a soloist in conjunction with a major label, as well as revealing that her debut album will be of the pop and R&B genre. Her album will also be fully in English. She performed at the KCA Argentina 2018, where she sang the song "World's Collide" and "Unísono" again with the cast of Kally's Mashup. On November 7, Reficco appeared at the Meus Prêmios Nick 2018, where she performed the same songs again, but this time "Unísono", together with Alex Hoyer and Lalo Brito; Reficco received Nickelodeon Kids' Choice Awards.

In 2022, she appeared in Do Revenge, a Netflix film, and starred as Noa Olivar in the HBO Max series Pretty Little Liars. She also acted alongside KJ Apa in One Fast Move, and La Dolce Villa (2025). In 2026, she starred as Ry in The Last Sunrise.

== Personal life ==
Reficco has identified as bisexual. She was in a relationship with Argentine racing driver Franco Colapinto for several months until October 2026.

== Filmography ==
Key
†	Denotes films that have not yet been released

=== Film ===
Year	Title	Role	Notes
2022	Do Revenge	Montana Ruiz	Regular role
2024	One Fast Move	Camila	
2025	La Dolce Villa	Olivia Field	Lead Role
2026	A Cuban Girl's Guide to Tea and Tomorrow †	Lila Reyes	Post-production
2026	The Last Sunrise	Oriah "Ry" Pera	Lead role
2026	Baton †		Post-production

=== Television ===
Year	Title	Role	Notes
2017–2019	Kally's Mashup	Kally Ponce	Lead role
2019	Club 57	Kally Ponce	Guest role; 1 episode
2021	Kally's Mashup ¡Un cumpleaños muy Kally!	Kally Ponce	Television film
2022–2024	Pretty Little Liars	Noa Olivar	Main role

== Theatre ==
Year	Title	Role	Venue	Notes
2019	Evita	Eva Perón (Young)	New York City Center	Off-Broadway
2020	Next to Normal	Natalie	Kennedy Center	Washington D.C.
2020–2021	Juegos, la obra	Susana	Paseo La Plaza	Buenos Aires
2024–2025	Hadestown	Eurydice	Walter Kerr Theatre	Broadway

== Discography ==
Soundtrack albums

- Kally's Mashup: La Música (Banda Sonora Original de la Serie de TV) (2018)
- Kally's Mashup: La Música, Vol. 2 (Banda Sonora Original de la Serie de TV) (2019)
- Kally's Mashup: Un Cumpleaños Muy Kally – Banda Sonora Original de la Película (2021)

Singles

- 2020: "Tuya"
- 2021: "De Ti"
- 2021: "Tanto Calor"
- 2022: "Rápido y Furioso"
- 2022: "En Cartagena"
