= Side-Out Foundation =

American non-profit organization

The Side-Out Foundation
- The Side-Out Foundation's logo
- Founded: 2004
- Type: Nonprofit organization
- Headquarters: 3935 University Dr. Fairfax, VA 22030
- Website: side-out.org

The Side-Out Foundation, located in Fairfax, Virginia, is an American non-profit breast cancer charity that raises awareness and funds for the treatment of metastatic breast cancer. Side-Out fundraises mainly through volleyball-related events. Their mission, as it is stated on their website is, "to unite volleyball players and coaches and to have them work toward the common goal of furthering breast cancer awareness, education, and patient services." Side-Out has a board of directors and team of scientific advisers.

== History ==
The Side-Out Foundation was established in 2004 by West Springfield High School girls volleyball coach Rick Dunetz, after his mother, Gloria Dunetz, was diagnosed with stage IV breast cancer.

The Dig Pink movement was started by The-Side Out Foundation. On August 13, 2014, The Side-Out Story, a documentary about the Side-Out Foundation was published to Rick Dunetz's YouTube channel. The film also was shown at the All Sports Los Angeles Film Festival where it received an Audience Choice Award.

== Activities ==
Side-Out's activities raise about $1.5 million for the organization each year. Since their roots are in the sport of volleyball their events and activities revolve around the sport.

A Dig Pink Rally at Blue Valley West High School in 2014

Each year hundreds of Middle School, High School, and College volleyball teams host Dig Pink events as part of the rally to raise both funds and awareness for metastatic breast cancer. The 2013 Dig Pink Rally raised $1.3 million from 925 teams across the country.

== The Side-Out Protocol ==
The main beneficiary of the Side-Out Foundation is their own clinical trial, the Side-Out Protocol. The Side-Out Protocol focuses on the treatment of metastatic breast cancer using applied proteomics and molecular medicine. The main basis of The Side-Out Protocol is using personalized medicine as treatment for metastatic breast cancer and is one of the first uses of proteomics in treating breast cancer.
