= List of Amazon MGM Studios films =

This is a list of films originally produced and/or distributed theatrically by the entertainment company Amazon MGM Studios. This list does not include the pre-September 2023 releases from Metro-Goldwyn-Mayer, United Artists, Orion Pictures or American International Pictures, despite titles from 2023 onwards carrying the 2021 MGM logo at the start of them.

== 2010s ==
Release date	Title	Notes
December 4, 2015	Chi-Raq	co-distribution with Roadside Attractions; first film and release as Amazon Studios
March 11, 2016	Creative Control	U.S. co-distribution with Magnolia Pictures
April 22, 2016	Elvis & Nixon	U.S. co-distribution with Bleecker Street
May 13, 2016	Love & Friendship	North American co-distribution excluding airlines with Roadside Attractions
June 24, 2016	The Neon Demon	U.S. co-distribution with Broad Green Pictures
June 24, 2016	Wiener-Dog	North American co-distribution with IFC Films
July 15, 2016	Café Society	North American co-distribution with Lionsgate
July 29, 2016	Gleason	U.S. co-distribution with Open Road Films
August 26, 2016	Complete Unknown	U.S. co-distribution with IFC Films
September 9, 2016	Author: The JT LeRoy Story	co-distribution with Magnolia Pictures
September 23, 2016	The Dressmaker	U.S. co-distribution with Broad Green Pictures
October 21, 2016	An American Girl Story – Melody 1963: Love Has to Win	co-distribution with American Girl
October 21, 2016	The Handmaiden	U.S. co-distribution with Magnolia Pictures
October 28, 2016	Gimme Danger	U.S., U.K. and Irish distribution only; co-distribution with Magnolia Pictures in the U.S.
November 18, 2016	Manchester by the Sea	North American co-distribution with Roadside Attractions; National Board of Review Award for Best Film; Nominated – Academy Award for Best Picture; Nominated – BAFTA Award for Best Film; Nominated – Critics' Choice Movie Award for Best Picture; Nominated – Golden Globe Award for Best Motion Picture – Drama; Nominated – Independent Spirit Award for Best Film; Nominated – Producers Guild of America Award for Best Theatrical Motion Picture
December 28, 2016	Paterson	co-distribution with Bleecker Street
January 27, 2017	The Salesman	North American co-distribution excluding airlines with Cohen Media Group; Academy Award for Best Foreign Language Film; National Board of Review Award for Best Foreign Language Film; Nominated – BAFTA Award for Best Film Not in the English Language; Nominated – Critics' Choice Movie Award for Best Foreign Language Film; Nominated – Golden Globe Award for Best Foreign Language Film
February 3, 2017	I Am Not Your Negro	U.S. co-distribution with Magnolia Pictures; BAFTA Award for Best Documentary; Nominated – Academy Award for Best Documentary Feature; Nominated – Independent Spirit Award for Best Documentary Feature
April 14, 2017	The Lost City of Z	North American co-distribution with Bleecker Street
May 12, 2017	The Wall	co-distribution with Roadside Attractions
June 23, 2017	The Big Sick	distribution in the U.S., U.K., Ireland, France, Germany, Austria, Spain, Russia, Poland, India, China, Japan, Korea and Malaysia only; co-distribution with Lionsgate in the U.S. Critics' Choice Movie Award for Best Comedy; Nominated – Critics' Choice Movie Award for Best Picture; Nominated – Producers Guild of America Award for Best Theatrical Motion Picture
July 7, 2017	City of Ghosts	co-distribution with IFC Films
July 21, 2017	Landline	U.S. co-distribution with Magnolia Pictures
August 11, 2017	The Only Living Boy in New York	co-distribution with Roadside Attractions
August 18, 2017	Crown Heights	co-distribution with IFC Films
September 15, 2017	Brad's Status	co-distribution with Annapurna Pictures
October 13, 2017	Human Flow	U.S. distribution only
October 20, 2017	Wonderstruck	co-distribution with Roadside Attractions
November 3, 2017	Last Flag Flying	co-distribution with Lionsgate
December 1, 2017	Wonder Wheel	
March 9, 2018	Gringo	co-distribution with STXfilms
April 6, 2018	You Were Never Really Here	U.S. distribution only
April 20, 2018	Pass Over	distributed under Amazon Prime Video
July 13, 2018	Don't Worry, He Won't Get Far on Foot	
July 20, 2018	Zoe	distribution in North America, the U.K., Ireland, Australia, New Zealand and Italy only; distributed under Amazon Prime Video
September 21, 2018	Life Itself	U.S. distribution only
October 12, 2018	Beautiful Boy	
October 26, 2018	Suspiria	
December 21, 2018	Cold War	Nominated – Academy Award for Best Foreign Language Film; Nominated – BAFTA Award for Best Film Not in the English Language; Nominated – Critics' Choice Movie Award for Best Foreign Language Film
April 5, 2019	Peterloo	
April 13, 2019	Guava Island	distributed under Amazon Prime Video
May 17, 2019	Photograph	U.S., Indian and Japanese distribution only
June 7, 2019	Late Night	U.S. distribution only
August 9, 2019	One Child Nation	distribution excluding television in the U.S., U.K., Ireland, France, Germany, Austria, Switzerland, the Netherlands, Denmark, Sweden and Norway only
August 23, 2019	Brittany Runs a Marathon	distribution only
September 13, 2019	The Goldfinch	distributed by Warner Bros. Pictures
November 8, 2019	Honey Boy	U.S. and Japanese distribution only
November 15, 2019	The Report	distribution only
December 6, 2019	The Aeronauts	distributed under Amazon Prime Video
December 13, 2019	Seberg	U.S. distribution only
December 20, 2019	Invisible Life	U.S. distribution only

== 2020s ==
Release date	Title	Notes
January 10, 2020	Les Misérables	U.S. distribution only Nominated – Academy Award for Best International Feature Film; Nominated – BAFTA Award for Best Film Not in the English Language; Nominated – Critics' Choice Movie Award for Best Foreign Language Film; Nominated – Golden Globe Award for Best Foreign Language Film; Nominated – Independent Spirit Award for Best International Film
January 17, 2020	Troop Zero	distributed under Amazon Prime Video
March 20, 2020	Blow the Man Down	distribution under Amazon Prime Video only
April 17, 2020	Selah and the Spades	distribution under Amazon Prime Video only
May 29, 2020	The Vast of Night	distribution under Amazon Prime Video only
June 18, 2020	7500	distribution outside Germany, Austria and Switzerland only; distributed under Amazon Prime Video
June 26, 2020	My Spy	U.S. and select international distribution under Amazon Prime Video only; distribution rights currently co-owned by Lionsgate
July 24, 2020	Radioactive	U.S. distribution under Amazon Prime Video only
August 21, 2020	Chemical Hearts	distributed under Amazon Prime Video
August 28, 2020	Get Duked!	distribution under Amazon Prime Video only
September 9, 2020	All In: The Fight for Democracy	distribution only
October 6, 2020	Black Box	co-production with Blumhouse Television; distributed under Amazon Prime Video
October 6, 2020	The Lie	co-distribution with Blumhouse Television only; distributed under Amazon Prime Video
October 9, 2020	Time	distribution only National Board of Review Award for Best Documentary Film; Nominated – Academy Award for Best Documentary Feature Film; Nominated – Critics' Choice Documentary Award for Best Documentary Feature; Nominated – Independent Spirit Award for Best Documentary Feature; Nominated – Producers Guild of America Award for Best Documentary Motion Picture
October 13, 2020	Nocturne	co-production with Blumhouse Television; distributed under Amazon Prime Video
October 13, 2020	Evil Eye	co-production with Blumhouse Television and Purple Pebble Pictures; distributed under Amazon Prime Video
October 23, 2020	Borat Subsequent Moviefilm: Delivery of Prodigious Bribe to American Regime for Make Benefit Once Glorious Nation of Kazakhstan	distribution under Amazon Prime Video only; produced by Four by Two Films; Golden Globe Award for Best Motion Picture – Musical or Comedy; Nominated – Critics' Choice Movie Award for Best Comedy; Nominated – Producers Guild of America Award for Best Theatrical Motion Picture
November 20, 2020	Sound of Metal	U.S. theatrical and worldwide streaming distribution only Nominated – Academy Award for Best Picture; Nominated – Critics' Choice Movie Award for Best Picture; Nominated – Producers Guild of America Award for Best Theatrical Motion Picture
November 25, 2020	Uncle Frank	distribution under Amazon Prime Video only; produced by Miramax and Your Face Here Productions; GLAAD Media Award for Outstanding TV Movie; Nominated – Primetime Emmy Award for Outstanding Television Movie
December 4, 2020	I'm Your Woman	
December 23, 2020	Sylvie's Love	distribution under Amazon Prime Video only; produced by Iam21 Entertainment and Seven Letter Word Films
December 25, 2020	One Night in Miami...	Nominated – Critics' Choice Movie Award for Best Picture; Nominated – Producers Guild of America Award for Best Theatrical Motion Picture
December 30, 2020	Herself	distribution only
February 5, 2021	Bliss	distributed under Amazon Prime Video
February 12, 2021	The Map of Tiny Perfect Things	distributed under Amazon Prime Video
March 5, 2021	Coming 2 America	distributed under Amazon Prime Video; produced by Paramount Pictures, Eddie Murphy Productions, Misher Films and New Republic Pictures
April 30, 2021	Without Remorse	distributed under Amazon Prime Video; produced by Paramount Pictures, Skydance Media, Weed Road Productions, Outlier Society, New Republic Pictures and Midnight Radio Productions
May 7, 2021	The Boy from Medellin	distributed under Amazon Prime Video
May 21, 2021	Pink: All I Know So Far	distributed under Amazon Prime Video
June 25, 2021	Mary J. Blige's My Life	distributed under Amazon Prime Video
July 2, 2021	The Tomorrow War	distributed under Amazon Prime Video; produced by Skydance Media, Paramount Pictures, Phantom Four Films and Lit Entertainment Group
July 23, 2021	Val	U.S. and Latin American distribution only; produced by A24, Boardwalk Pictures and Cartel Films
July 23, 2021	Jolt	distribution in North and Latin America, the U.K., Ireland, Australia, New Zealand, France, Spain, Italy, Greece, Cyprus, Eastern Europe, Scandinavia, the Benelux, Portugal, Turkey and Japan only; distributed under Amazon Prime Video
August 6, 2021	Annette	U.S. distribution only
September 3, 2021	Cinderella	distributed under Amazon Prime Video
September 10, 2021	The Voyeurs	distributed under Amazon Prime Video
September 17, 2021	Everybody's Talking About Jamie	distributed under Amazon Prime Video; Nominated – BAFTA Award for Outstanding British Film; Nominated – GLAAD Media Award for Outstanding Film – Wide Release
September 17, 2021	The Mad Women's Ball	distributed under Amazon Prime Video
September 17, 2021	My Name Is Pauli Murray	
September 24, 2021	Birds of Paradise	distributed under Amazon Prime Video
October 1, 2021	Black as Night	co-production with Blumhouse Television; distributed under Amazon Prime Video
October 1, 2021	Bingo Hell	co-production with Blumhouse Television; distributed under Amazon Prime Video
October 8, 2021	Madres	co-production with Blumhouse Television; distributed under Amazon Prime Video
October 8, 2021	The Manor	co-production with Blumhouse Television; distributed under Amazon Prime Video
October 22, 2021	The Electrical Life of Louis Wain	U.S. distribution only
November 5, 2021	A Man Named Scott	distributed under Amazon Prime Video
November 11, 2021	Flashback	distributed under Amazon Prime Video
November 12, 2021	Mayor Pete	
November 25, 2021	Burning	co-production with Propagate Content and Dirty Films; distributed under Amazon Prime Video
December 3, 2021	Encounter	co-production with Raw and Film4 Productions
December 10, 2021	Being the Ricardos	co-production with Escape Artists; Nominated – Producers Guild of America Award for Best Theatrical Motion Picture
December 17, 2021	The Tender Bar	co-production with Smokehouse Pictures
January 7, 2022	A Hero	North American distribution only Nominated – Critics' Choice Movie Award for Best Foreign Language Film; Nominated – Golden Globe Award for Best Foreign Language Film
January 14, 2022	Hotel Transylvania: Transformania	distribution outside China under Amazon Prime Video only; produced by Columbia Pictures and Sony Pictures Animation
February 11, 2022	I Want You Back	distributed under Amazon Prime Video; co-production with The Safran Company and The Walk-Up Company
March 4, 2022	Lucy and Desi	distributed under Amazon Prime Video
March 18, 2022	Master	distributed under Amazon Prime Video
April 8, 2022	All the Old Knives	co-production with Barry Linen Productions, Chockstone Pictures, Churchill Films, Entertainment One, Jackson Pictures, Nick Wechsler Productions
May 20, 2022	Emergency	
June 24, 2022	A$AP Rocky: Stockholm Syndrome	distributed under Amazon Prime Video
June 27, 2022	My Fake Boyfriend	distributed under Amazon Prime Video
July 1, 2022	Approaching Shadows	co-production with Bohemia Media and TAPE Community Music and Film
July 15, 2022	1UP	distributed under Amazon Prime Video
July 15, 2022	Don't Make Me Go	co-production with De Line Pictures
July 22, 2022	Anything's Possible	distributed under Amazon Prime Video
July 29, 2022	Thirteen Lives	U.S. co-distribution with United Artists Releasing; produced by Metro-Goldwyn-Mayer, Imagine Entertainment, Bron Creative, Magnolia Mae and Storyteller Productions
August 5, 2022	Doblemente Embarazada 2	distributed under Amazon Prime Video
August 26, 2022	Samaritan	U.S. co-distribution with United Artists Releasing; produced by Metro-Goldwyn-Mayer and Balboa Productions
August 26, 2022	Untrapped: The Story of Lil Baby	distributed under Amazon Prime Video
September 9, 2022	Flight/Risk	distributed under Amazon Prime Video
September 16, 2022	Goodnight Mommy	distributed under Amazon Prime Video
September 23, 2022	Catherine Called Birdy	co-production with Working Title Films and Good Thing Going
September 30, 2022	Argentina, 1985	co-production with La Unión de los Ríos, Kenya Films, Infinity Hill; co-distributed with Digicine; Golden Globe Award for Best Foreign Language Film; Nominated - Academy Award for Best International Feature Film; Nominated - BAFTA Award for Best Film Not in the English Language; Nominated - Critics' Choice Movie Award for Best Foreign Language Film
September 30, 2022	My Best Friend's Exorcism	co-production with The Gotham Group, Quirk Productions and Fifth Season
October 5, 2022	The Sound of 007	distributed under Prime Video
October 21, 2022	My Policeman	co-production with Berlanti Schechter Productions
October 28, 2022	Run Sweetheart Run	distribution only; produced by Blumhouse Productions; distributed under Amazon Prime Video
November 4, 2022	Good Night Oppy	co-production with Film 45, Amblin Entertainment and Tripod Media; Critics' Choice Documentary Award for Best Documentary Feature; Critics' Choice Documentary Award for Best Science/Nature Documentary
November 10, 2022	Autumn Beat	distributed under Prime Video
November 18, 2022	Sachertorte	distributed under Prime Video; co-production with DCM Pictures
November 18, 2022	The People We Hate at the Wedding	distributed under Prime Video; co-production with FilmNation
November 23, 2022	Nanny	distributed under Prime Video; co-distribution with Blumhouse Productions; produced by Topic Studios, LinLay Productions and Stay Gold Features
December 2, 2022	Your Christmas or Mine?	distributed under Prime Video
December 9, 2022	Something from Tiffany's	distributed under Amazon Prime Video; co-production with Hello Sunshine
December 21, 2022	Wildcat	distributed under Prime Video
December 24, 2022	Gospel	distributed under Prime Video
January 27, 2023	Shotgun Wedding	distribution in North and Latin America, the U.K., Ireland, Australia, New Zealand, France, Italy, Spain, Scandinavia, the Benelux and Japan under Amazon Prime Video only; produced by Lionsgate, Summit Entertainment, Mandeville Films and Nuyorican Productions
February 10, 2023	Somebody I Used to Know	co-production with Temple Hill Entertainment and Black Bear Pictures distributed under Prime Video
March 3, 2023	Sayen	distributed under Prime Video
March 24, 2023	Reggie	distributed under Prime Video
April 5, 2023	Air	co-production with Mandalay Pictures, Artists Equity and Skydance Sports; international distribution by Warner Bros. Pictures; Nominated – Golden Globe Award for Best Motion Picture – Musical or Comedy
April 7, 2023	On a Wing and a Prayer	distributed under Amazon Prime Video; produced by Metro-Goldwyn-Mayer and LightWorkers Media
April 21, 2023	Judy Blume Forever	distributed under Amazon Prime Video; produced by Imagine Documentaries
May 5, 2023	Mother's Day Is Cancelled	distributed under Amazon Prime Video; co-production with Corazón Films
June 8, 2023	Culpa mía	distributed under Amazon Prime Video; co-production with Pokeepsie Films
July 7, 2023	The Initiated	distributed under Amazon Prime Video
August 11, 2023	Red, White & Royal Blue	distributed under Amazon Prime Video and final film released under the Amazon Studios name; co-production with Berlanti/Schechter Films; Nominated – Primetime Emmy Award for Outstanding Television Movie; Nominated – Producers Guild of America Award for Best Streamed or Televised Movie
September 8, 2023	Sitting in Bars with Cake	distributed under Amazon Prime Video and first film released under the Amazon MGM Studios name; co-production with Resonate Entertainment and All Night Diner
September 15, 2023	A Million Miles Away	distributed under Amazon Prime Video; co-production with Redrum and Select Films
September 22, 2023	Cassandro	distribution only; produced by Escape Artists and Panorama Global
October 6, 2023	Foe	distribution only; produced by See-Saw Films, I Am That Productions, Anonymous Content and Screen Australia
October 6, 2023	The Burial	co-production with Bobby Shriver Inc. and Double Nickel Entertainment
October 6, 2023	Totally Killer	distributed under Amazon Prime Video; co-production with Blumhouse Productions and Divide/Conquer
October 10, 2023	Mr. Dressup: The Magic of Make-Believe	distributed under Amazon Prime Video; co-production with marblemedia, Pyre Productions and Hawkeye Pictures
October 11, 2023	Awareness	distributed under Amazon Prime Video; co-production with Federation Spain and Dbemna Content
October 13, 2023	Daisuke Jigen	distributed under Amazon Prime Video; co-production with TMS Entertainment
October 13, 2023	Silver Dollar Road	distributed under Amazon Prime Video; co-production with Velvet Film, ProPublica and JuVee Productions
October 24, 2023	Hot Potato: The Story of the Wiggles	distributed under Amazon Prime Video; co-production with Screen Australia, Augusto, Frog Productions and SAM Content
October 27, 2023	The Day of the Dead Is Cancelled	distributed under Amazon Prime Video; co-production with Corazón Films
November 2, 2023	Knuckle Girl	distributed under Amazon Prime Video; co-production with Kross Pictures
November 17, 2023	Saltburn	distributed under Metro-Goldwyn-Mayer; co-production with MRC Film, LuckyChap Entertainment and Lie Still; select international distribution by Warner Bros. Pictures; Nominated – Critics' Choice Movie Award for Best Picture
November 17, 2023	Maxine's Baby: The Tyler Perry Story	distributed under Amazon Prime Video; co-production with Bekele Films
November 24, 2023	Elf Me	distributed under Amazon Prime Video; co-production with Goon Films and Lucky Red
December 1, 2023	Candy Cane Lane	distributed under Amazon Prime Video; co-production with Imagine Entertainment, Bubble Pictures and Big Indie Pictures
December 7, 2023	Mast Mein Rehne Ka	distributed under Amazon Prime Video
December 8, 2023	Your Christmas or Mine 2	distributed under Amazon Prime Video; co-production with Mighty Pebble Pictures, Shiny Button Productions and The Story Collective
December 8, 2023	World's First Christmas	distributed under Amazon Prime Video; co-production with Camisa Listrada
December 8, 2023	Dating Santa	distributed under Amazon Prime Video
December 8, 2023	Silver and the Book of Dreams	distributed under Amazon Prime Video; co-production with Constantin Film
December 8, 2023	Merry Little Batman	co-distributed with Warner Bros. Pictures under Amazon Prime Video; co-production with Warner Bros. Animation and DC Studios
December 15, 2023	American Fiction	distributed under Orion Pictures; produced by 3 Arts Entertainment, T-Street Productions, Almost Infinite and MRC Film; Nominated – Academy Award for Best Picture; Nominated – Critics' Choice Movie Award for Best Picture; Nominated – Golden Globe Award for Best Motion Picture – Musical or Comedy; Nominated – GLAAD Media Award for Outstanding Film – Wide Release; Nominated – Independent Spirit Award for Best Film; Nominated – Producers Guild of America Award for Best Theatrical Motion Picture
December 15, 2023	Breath of Life	distributed under Amazon Prime Video; co-production with Nemsia Films
December 22, 2023	How to Succeed at Losing	distributed under Amazon Prime Video; co-production with Dago García Productions
December 25, 2023	The Boys in the Boat	distributed under Metro-Goldwyn-Mayer; co-production with Smokehouse Pictures, Tempesta Films and Anonymous Content; select international distribution by Warner Bros. Pictures
January 12, 2024	The Beekeeper	U.S. and select international distribution under Metro-Goldwyn-Mayer only; co-production with Miramax, Cedar Park Entertainment and Punch Palace Productions
January 12, 2024	Role Play	U.S. and select international distribution under Amazon Prime Video only; co-production with Yes, Norman Productions, The Picture Company and StudioCanal
January 22, 2024	Kevin James: Irregardless	distributed under Amazon Prime Video; co-production with MetaFrame Media and Positive Image Video
January 26, 2024	Trunk - Locked In	distributed under Amazon Prime Video; co-production with Outside the Club
January 26, 2024	The Underdoggs	distributed under Amazon Prime Video; co-production with Metro-Goldwyn-Mayer, Death Row Pictures, Khalabo Ink Society and SMAC Entertainment
February 9, 2024	Upgraded	distributed under Amazon Prime Video; co-production with Gulfstream Pictures, Luber Roklin Entertainment and Tempo Productions
February 12, 2024	Five Blind Dates	distributed under Amazon Prime Video; co-production with Goalpost Pictures
February 16, 2024	This Is Me... Now: A Love Story	distributed under Amazon Prime Video; co-production with Nuyorican Productions
February 19, 2024	Giannis: The Marvelous Journey	distributed under Amazon Prime Video; co-production with Words+ Pictures and Improbable Media
February 29, 2024	Kids Are Growing Up: A Story About A Kid Named Laroi	distributed under Amazon Prime Video; co-production with OBB Pictures
March 7, 2024	Ricky Stanicky	distributed under Amazon Prime Video; co-production with Footloose Productions, Michael de Luca Productions, Rocket Science and Smart Entertainment
March 14, 2024	Frida	distributed under Amazon Prime Video; co-production with Imagine Documentaries, Time Studios and Storyville Films
March 21, 2024	Road House	distributed under Amazon Prime Video; co-production with Metro-Goldwyn-Mayer and Silver Pictures
April 4, 2024	Música	distributed under Amazon Prime Video; co-production with Wonderland Sound and Vision and Shots Studios
April 26, 2024	Challengers	distributed under Metro-Goldwyn-Mayer; co-production with Why Are You Acting?, Frenesy Film Company and Pascal Pictures; international distribution by Warner Bros. Pictures; Nominated – Golden Globe Award for Best Motion Picture – Musical or Comedy
April 26, 2024	Sayen: The Huntress	distributed under Amazon Prime Video
May 2, 2024	The Idea of You	distributed under Amazon Prime Video; co-production with I'll Have Another, Somewhere Pictures, and Welle Entertainment
May 17, 2024	The Blue Angels	distributed under Amazon Prime Video; produced by Bad Robot Productions, Zipper Bros. Films, Sutter Road Picture Company, Diamond Docs, Barnstorm Productions, IMAX Entertainment, and Dolphin Films
May 28, 2024	For Love & Life: No Ordinary Campaign	distributed under Amazon Prime Video; produced by Redtail Media
May 30, 2024	Die Hart 2: Die Harter	distributed under Amazon Prime Video; produced by Hartbeat, LLC
June 18, 2024	Power of the Dream	distributed under Amazon Prime Video; co-production with Trilogy Films, Industrial Media, Joy Mill Entertainment and Togethxr
June 20, 2024	Federer: Twelve Final Days	distributed under Amazon Prime Video; co-production with Lafcadia Productions
June 21, 2024	I Am: Celine Dion	distributed under Metro-Goldwyn-Mayer; co-production with Sony Music Entertainment, Les Productions Feeling and Vermilion Films
July 4, 2024	Space Cadet	distributed under Amazon Prime Video; co-production with Stampede Ventures
July 11, 2024	Tyler Perry's Divorce in the Black	distributed under Amazon Prime Video; co-production with Tyler Perry Studios
July 18, 2024	My Spy: The Eternal City	distributed under Amazon Prime Video; co-production with STX Films, MWM Studios, Dogbone Entertainment, Good Fear Content, Lupin Film, Madison Wells and NV Films
July 25, 2024	The Ministry of Ungentlemanly Warfare	distributed under Amazon Prime Video in select international territories; produced by Jerry Bruckheimer Films, Toff Guy Films and Black Bear Pictures
July 25, 2024	Cirque du Soleil: Without a Net	distributed under Amazon Prime Video; produced by Industrial Media Arts and Trilogy Films
August 8, 2024	One Fast Move	distributed under Amazon Prime Video; co-production with Gulfstream Pictures and Luber Roklin Entertainment
August 8, 2024	The Shakedown	distributed under Amazon Prime Video only; produced by Sketchbook Studios
August 15, 2024	Jackpot!	distributed under Amazon Prime Video; co-production with Roth/Kirschenbaum Films and Feigco Entertainment
August 23, 2024	Blink Twice	distributed under Metro-Goldwyn-Mayer; co-production with Free Association, this is important and Bold Choices; international distribution by Warner Bros. Pictures
September 13, 2024	My Old Ass	distribution only; produced by Indian Paintbrush and LuckyChap Entertainment; select international distribution by Warner Bros. Pictures; Nominated – Critics' Choice Movie Award for Best Comedy
September 26, 2024	Killer Heat	distributed under Amazon Prime Video; co-production with Makeready
October 3, 2024	House of Spoils	distributed under Amazon Prime Video; co-production with Blumhouse Productions, Divide/Conquer and Secret Engine
October 10, 2024	Brothers	distributed under Amazon Prime Video; produced by Legendary Pictures, Mad Chance Productions, Brolin Productions and Estuary Films
October 18, 2024	The Park Maniac	distributed under Amazon Prime Video; co-production with Santa Rita Filmes
October 24, 2024	Canary Black	U.S. distribution under Amazon Prime Video only; produced by Anton, Sentient Entertainment, Brickell & Broadbridge International, and Oakhurst Entertainment
October 31, 2024	Here	distribution in the U.K., Ireland, German-speaking Europe, Australia and New Zealand only; produced by Miramax and ImageMovers; theatrical rights licensed to Curzon Film in the U.K. and Ireland, DCM Film Distribution in German-speaking Europe and VVS Films in Australia and New Zealand
November 1, 2024	Freedom	distributed under Amazon Prime Video; co-production with Pitchipoï Productions
November 15, 2024	Red One	co-production with Seven Bucks Productions, The Detective Agency, Chris Morgan Productions and Big Indie; international distribution by Warner Bros. Pictures
December 6, 2024	Unstoppable	co-production with Artists Equity and Nuyorican Productions
December 13, 2024	Nickel Boys	distributed under Orion Pictures; co-production with Plan B Entertainment, Louverture Films and Anonymous Content; Nominated – Academy Award for Best Picture; Nominated – Critics' Choice Movie Award for Best Picture; Nominated – Golden Globe Award for Best Motion Picture – Drama; Nominated – Independent Spirit Award for Best Film
December 25, 2024	The Fire Inside	distributed under Metro-Goldwyn-Mayer; co-production with Pastel Productions
December 26, 2024	The Order	select international distribution only; produced by AGC Studios and Riff Raff Entertainment; distributed by Vertical in the United States
December 27, 2024	Culpa tuya	distributed under Amazon Prime Video; co-production with Pokeepsie Films
January 30, 2025	You're Cordially Invited	distributed under Amazon Prime Video; co-production with Hello Sunshine and Gloria Sanchez Productions
February 14, 2025	Broken Rage	distributed under Amazon Prime Video; co-production with Kitano Agency
February 28, 2025	Superboys of Malegaon	co-production with Excel Entertainment and Tiger Baby Films
March 6, 2025	Picture This	distributed under Amazon Prime Video; co-production with Ingenious Media and 42
March 19, 2025	My Mom, God, and Sylvie Vartan	co-production with Egérie Productions, Gaumont and Christal Films Productions
March 20, 2025	Duplicity	distributed under Amazon Prime Video; co-production with Tyler Perry Studios
March 27, 2025	Holland	distributed under Amazon Prime Video; co-production with Blossom Films, Pacific View Entertainment, 42 and Churchill Films
March 28, 2025	A Working Man	distribution outside the Middle East, the CIS, the Baltics, Greece, Cyprus and Asia excluding India only; co-production with Black Bear Pictures, Balboa Productions, BlockFilm, CAT5, Cedar Park Entertainment, Eastern Film Investments, Fifth Season and Punch Palace Productions; select international distribution by Warner Bros. Pictures
April 10, 2025	G20	distributed under Amazon Prime Video; co-production with JuVee Productions, Mad Chance Productions and MRC Film
April 17, 2025	The Siege at Thorn High	co-production with Come and See Pictures
April 25, 2025	The Accountant 2	co-production with Artists Equity, 51 Entertainment, Zero Gravity Management and Filmtribe; international distribution by Warner Bros. Pictures
May 1, 2025	Another Simple Favor	distributed under Amazon Prime Video; co-production with Lionsgate and Feigco Entertainment
May 9, 2025	Enemies	co-production with Atípica Films; distributed by Vértice 360 in Spain
May 23, 2025	Bhool Chuk Maaf	co-production with Maddock Films; distributed by PVR Inox Pictures and Pen Studios in India and Yash Raj Films outside of India
July 2, 2025	Heads of State	distributed under Amazon Prime Video; co-production with The Safran Company, Potboiler Productions and Big Indie Pictures
July 4, 2025	Uppu Kappurambu	distributed under Amazon Prime Video; co-production with Ellanar Films
August 6, 2025	The Pickup	distributed under Amazon Prime Video; co-production with The Story Company, Davis Entertainment and Eddie Murphy Productions
August 20, 2025	The Map That Leads to You	distributed under Amazon Prime Video; co-production with Temple Hill Entertainment
September 5, 2025	Preparation for the Next Life	distributed under Orion Pictures; co-production with Plan B Entertainment and Pastel
September 19, 2025	Nishaanchi	co-production with JAR Pictures and Flip Films
October 1, 2025	Play Dirty	distributed under Amazon Prime Video; co-production with Team Downey, Big Red Films and Toberoff Productions
October 8, 2025	Maintenance Required	distributed under Amazon Prime Video; co-production with Future Artists Entertainment, Luber Roklin Entertainment and Roukya Films
October 10, 2025	After the Hunt	co-production with Imagine Entertainment, Frenesy Film Company and Potboiler; international theatrical distribution by Sony Pictures Releasing International
October 22, 2025	Hedda	distributed under Amazon Prime Video; co-production with Orion Pictures, Plan B Entertainment; and Viva Maude
October 24, 2025	Eden	select international distribution only; produced by AGC Studios and Imagine Entertainment
November 5, 2025	Finding Joy	distributed under Amazon Prime Video; co-production with Tyler Perry Studios
November 7, 2025	Sarah's Oil	co-production with Kingdom Story Company, The Wonder Project, Wyldwood Productions and Why Not You Productions
November 12, 2025	Playdate	U.S. and select international distribution under Amazon Prime Video only; produced by WideAwake Pictures, Nickel City Pictures and A Higher Standard
November 14, 2025	Nishaanchi Part 2	distributed under Amazon Prime Video; co-production with JAR Pictures and Flip Films
November 21, 2025	31 Minutes: One Hot Christmas	distributed under Amazon Prime Video; co-production with Aplaplac Studio; based on the Chilean TV series 31 Minutos
December 3, 2025	Oh. What. Fun.	distributed under Amazon Prime Video; co-production with Semi Frontal Productions and TriBeCa Productions
December 10, 2025	Merv	distributed under Amazon Prime Video; co-production with Metro-Goldwyn-Mayer, Catchlight Studios, Lightworkers Media and Matt Baer Films
December 12, 2025	Tell Me Softly	distributed under Amazon Prime Video; co-production with Vaca Films
January 23, 2026	Cheekatilo	distributed under Amazon Prime Video; produced by Suresh Productions
January 23, 2026	Mercy	distributed under Metro-Goldwyn-Mayer; co-production with Atlas Entertainment and Bazelevs Company; international theatrical distribution by Sony Pictures Releasing International
January 28, 2026	The Wrecking Crew	distributed under Amazon Prime Video; co-production with Metro-Goldwyn-Mayer, 6th & Idaho Productions and Hard J Productions
January 30, 2026	Melania	distribution only; produced by RatPac Entertainment and New Element Media
February 4, 2026	Relationship Goals	distributed under Amazon Prime Video; co-production with Franklin Entertainment
February 6, 2026	Fabian and the Deadly Wedding	distributed under Amazon Prime Video; co-production with UFA Fiction
February 13, 2026	Crime 101	co-production with Raw, Working Title Films, The Story Factory and Wild State; international theatrical distribution by Sony Pictures Releasing International
February 25, 2026	The Bluff	distributed under Amazon Prime Video; co-production with AGBO, Cinestar Pictures and Purple Pebble Pictures
February 27, 2026	Man on the Run	distributed under Amazon Prime Video; produced by Tremolo Productions, MPL Communications and PolyGram Entertainment
March 20, 2026	Project Hail Mary	distributed under Metro-Goldwyn-Mayer; co-production with Pascal Pictures, Open Invite Entertainment, Lord Miller Productions and Waypoint Entertainment; international theatrical distribution by Sony Pictures Releasing International
March 25, 2026	Pretty Lethal	distributed under Amazon Prime Video; produced by 87North Productions and Gulfstream Pictures
April 15, 2026	Balls Up	distributed under Amazon Prime Video; co-production with Skydance Media and Reese/Wernick Productions
May 8, 2026	The Sheep Detectives	co-production with Working Title Films, Lord Miller Productions and Three Strange Angels Productions; international theatrical distribution by Sony Pictures Releasing International
May 15, 2026	Is God Is	distributed under Orion Pictures; co-production with Viva Maude and Linden Entertainment
May 20, 2026	Jack Ryan: Ghost War	distributed under Amazon Prime Video; co-production with Paramount Pictures and Sunday Night Productions
June 5, 2026	Masters of the Universe	distributed under Metro-Goldwyn-Mayer; co-production with Mattel Studios and Escape Artists; international theatrical distribution by Sony Pictures Releasing International
July 29, 2026	The Devil's Mouth	distributed under Amazon Prime Video; co-production with Lionsgate and Thunder Road Films
August 7, 2026	Tony	studio credit and select international distribution only; co-production with A24, Star Thrower Entertainment and Zapruder Films
August 26, 2026	The Last Sunrise	distributed under Amazon Prime Video; co-production with Frayed Pages Media, Ethea Entertainment, Luber Roklin Entertainment and Pitt Street
September 2, 2026	The Runner	distribution outside the CIS under Amazon Prime Video only; co-production with Rockwood Pictures
September 4, 2026	Mirzapur: The Movie	co-production with Excel Entertainment; distributed in India by AA Films
September 18, 2026	Vibe	co-production with Drongo Films; distributed in India by PVR Inox Pictures
September 23, 2026	The Love Hypothesis	distributed under Amazon Prime Video; co-production with MRC
September 25, 2026	Your Mother Your Mother Your Mother	distributed under Orion Pictures; co-production with Two & Two Pictures
October 2, 2026	Verity	co-production with Eat the Cat, Semi-Formal Productions, Somewhere Pictures, Heartbones Entertainment and Shiny Penny Productions; international theatrical distribution by Sony Pictures Releasing International
October 14, 2026	Love of Your Life	distributed under Amazon Prime Video; co-production with Open Invite Entertainment
October 16, 2026	Nayyi Navelli	co-production with Colour Yellow Productions; distributed in India by PVR Inox Pictures
October 23, 2026	Ali G: Who Iz I?	distribution only; produced by Four by Two Films; select international theatrical distribution by Sony Pictures Releasing International
November 4, 2026	The Mongoose	distribution outside the U.S., Middle East, Israel, the CIS, Greece, Cyprus and Asia excluding India only; produced by Code Entertainment and Jupiter Peak Productions
November 6, 2026	I Play Rocky	U.S. distribution under Metro-Goldwyn-Mayer only; co-production with Fireside Films and Baha Productions
November 13, 2026	How to Rob a Bank	co-production with Imagine Entertainment and 87North Productions; international theatrical distribution outside Japan by Sony Pictures Releasing International
November 18, 2026	Madden	distributed under Amazon Prime Video; co-production with Escape Artists and SMAC Entertainment

== Upcoming films ==
Release date	Title	Notes
November 23, 2026	Clashing Through the Snow	distributed under Amazon Prime Video; co-production with Wonderland Sound and Vision, Luber Roklin Entertainment and Industry Entertainment
December 2, 2026	The Man with the Bag	distributed under Amazon Prime Video; co-production with Grey Matter Productions
January 15, 2027	The Beekeeper 2	distribution outside German-speaking Europe excluding streaming, the Middle East, Greece, Cyprus and Asia excluding India under Metro-Goldwyn-Mayer only; produced by Miramax, Punch Palace Productions and Long Shot Productions; select international theatrical distribution by Sony Pictures Releasing International
February 24, 2027	The Telepathy Tapes	
March 5, 2027	The Thomas Crown Affair	distributed under Metro-Goldwyn-Mayer; co-production with Outlier Society, Atlas Entertainment and Toberoff Productions; select international theatrical distribution by Sony Pictures Releasing International
April 23, 2027	Spaceballs: The New One	distributed under Metro-Goldwyn-Mayer; co-production with Brooksfilms and Imagine Entertainment
June 25, 2027	The Hole	distributed under Orion Pictures; produced by Anthology Studios, K Period Media and Esmail Corp
August 6, 2027	Jason Statham Stole My Bike	distribution outside the U.S., Caribbean, the CIS, the Middle East, Israel and Asia excluding India only; produced by Black Bear Pictures, 87North Productions, Punch Palace Productions and Beryllium Entertainment
October 1, 2027	Untitled Christopher McQuarrie thriller	distributed under United Artists; co-production with Hungry Bull Productions and Mainstay Entertainment
October 8, 2027	The Haunting of Hotel Transylvania	select international distribution only; co-production with Columbia Pictures and Sony Pictures Animation
November 12, 2027	Seasons	co-production with 21 Laps Entertainment, Blumhouse Productions, Atomic Monster and 12:01 Films
December 3, 2027	Si los muertos hablaran	
December 25, 2027	Alone at Dawn	distributed under Metro-Goldwyn-Mayer; co-production with Imagine Entertainment, The Hideaway Entertainment and Thruline Entertainment
December 25, 2027	Lizard Music	distributed under United Artists; co-production with Out for the Count Productions, Seven Bucks Productions and Magnetic Fields Entertainment
June 9, 2028	The Mandela Catalogue	distributed under United Artists; co-production with Amblin Entertainment and Paper Street Pictures

=== Undated films ===
Release date	Title	Notes	Production status
2027	4 Kids Walk Into a Bank	North American distribution only under Orion Pictures; produced by Miramax, Picturestart, Point Grey Pictures, Black Mask Studios and Uncle Pete Productions	Completed
2027	Ally Clark	co-production with Winkler Films and JuVee Productions	Post-production
2027	Close Personal Friends	co-production with Maximum Effort and Walk-Up Company	Completed
2027	A Colt Is My Passport	distributed under Orion Pictures; co-production with Severn Screen and One More One Productions	Post-production
2027	Goodbye Girl	co-production with Gulfstream Pictures and The RAD Lab	Post-production
2027	Hello & Paris	distribution only; produced by Fifth Season	Post-production
2027	Highlander	distributed under United Artists; co-production with Original Film, 87Eleven Entertainment, Davis-Panzer Productions and Bluegrass 7	Post-production
2027	Hivemind	distributed under Amazon Prime Video; co-production with Thunder Road and Badlands	Post-production
2027	Honeymoon with Harry	co-production with Gulfstream Pictures and Sullivan Street Productions	Post-production
2027	Isle of Man	co-production with Free Association, Plan B Entertainment and Entertainment 360	Post-production
2027	Judgment Day	co-production with Gloria Sanchez Productions and Stoller Global Solutions	Completed
2027	The Kellys	distributed under Amazon Prime Video; co-production with Thunder Road Films	Post-production
2027	The Last Druid	distribution in Canada, the U.K., Ireland, Australia and New Zealand only; produced by AGC Studios, 42 and Nostromo Pictures	Post-production
2027	Love Love	co-production with RK Films and 3 Arts Entertainment	Post-production
2027	Nightwatching	international distribution only; produced by Scott Free Productions, Picturestart, Brick for Sheep and Fifth Season	Post-production
2027	Red, White & Royal Wedding	co-production with Berlanti-Schechter Films and Sullivan Street Productions	Completed
2027	Road House 2	distributed under Metro-Goldwyn-Mayer; co-production with Atlas Entertainment, Silver Pictures and Nine Stories Productions	Post-production
2027	Subversion	co-production with Di Bonaventura Pictures	Completed
2027	Supermax	distribution only; produced by Miramax, the Picture Company and Westbrook Studios	Filming
2027	Tyrant	co-production with The Picture Company and Secret Menu	Post-production
2027	Untitled Mike Thornton biopic film	co-production with Balboa Productions, Hidden Pictures, and AllyCat Entertainment	Post-production
2027	Untitled Stephen Merchant film	co-production with Point Grey Pictures	Post-production
2027	Voltron	co-production with World Events Productions, Hidden Pictures and Hobie Films	Post-production
2027	You Deserve Each Other	co-production with Fifth Season and Likely Story	Completed
TBA	Deadlocked	distributed under Amazon Prime Video; co-production with Range Media Partners, C2, and Foxxhole Productions	Pre-production
TBA	Egg Baby	distributed under Amazon Prime Video; co-production with XYZ Films and BuzzFeed Studios	Pre-production
TBA	The Executioner's Song	distributed under United Artists; co-production with Marsh Entertainment	Pre-production
TBA	Heat 2	distributed under United Artists; co-production with Jerry Bruckheimer Films	Pre-production
TBA	One Night Out	distributed under Orion Pictures	Pre-production
TBA	The Parlay	co-production with Hyperobject Industries, I'd Watch That and 59% Productions	Pre-production
TBA	Pumping Black	select international distribution only; co-production with Shiny Penny Productions, Anton and MountainA	Filming
TBA	Summoner	co-production with Nocturna	Filming
TBA	Throttled	co-production with Brownstone Productions and Ethea Entertainment	Pre-production
TBA	Upgraded 2	co-production with Gulfstream Pictures, Honor Role, Luber Roklin Entertainment and Tempo Productions	Pre-production
TBA	Serendipity	co-production with Miramax and Semi-Formal Productions	Pre-production

=== In development ===
Title	Notes
'68	distributed under Metro-Goldwyn-Mayer; co-production with MACRO
A Murder to Remember	co-production with Audible, Windlight Pictures, and HungryDuck Productions
A Stage Set for Villains	co-production with Premeditated Productions
American Speed	co-production with Atlas Entertainment
Animal	distributed under Metro-Goldwyn-Mayer; co-production with Plan B Entertainment
Attachment Parenting	co-production with Davis Entertainment and Eddie Murphy
Baby Boom	co-production with Shiny Penny and Semi-Formal Productions
Best of Enemies	co-production with Atlas Entertainment
Billion-Dollar Ransom	co-production with 6th & Idaho Productions
Blasphemous	co-production with Seven Bucks Productions and Thunder Road Films
Bob the Builder	co-production with Mattel Studios, ShadowMachine and Nuyorican Productions
Burn Night	co-production with Safehouse Pictures
Butcher & Blackbird	co-production with Lyrical Media and Embrace
Christmas in Paradise	distributed under United Artists
Clean Air	co-production with Westbrook Studios, Kick The Habit Productions and NASCAR
Code Black	co-production with Nine Stories Productions and 12:01 Films
Collision	co-production with Nine Stories Productions and The Story Factory
Compulsive Liar	co-production with 21 Laps Entertainment, Gaumont and Winter Coat
Counting Miracles	co-production with AllyCat Entertainment, Industry Entertainment and Di Novi Pictures
Country Roads	co-production with Seven Bucks Productions
Coyote Blue	co-production with dj2 Entertainment
Crying in H Mart	distributed under Orion Pictures; co-production with Shiny Penny
Da Understudy	co-production with Tall Street Productions and Westbrook
Deep Storm	co-production with Safehouse Pictures
Drago	distributed under Metro-Goldwyn-Mayer; co-production with Balboa Productions and Outlier Society
Dragon Cursed	co-production with Premeditated Productions
Eleanor Oliphant Is Completely Fine	distributed under Metro-Goldwyn-Mayer; co-production with Hello Sunshine
Ending Things	co-production with Davis Entertainment, Lit Entertainment, Purple Pebble Pictures, Inspire Entertainment and Make It With Gravy Productions
Ex-Husbands	co-production with Berlanti Productions
Exoplanet	distributed under Metro-Goldwyn-Mayer; co-production with Matt Tolmach Productions
Expiration Dates	co-production with Belletrist Productions and Featherweight Pictures
Fake Wedding	co-production with Small Victory, 12:01 Films and Davis Entertainment
Fantasy Camp	distributed under United Artists; co-production with 2.0 Entertainment
FernGully	co-production with Shiny Penny, SFO Entertainment and Defiant by Nature
Fiddler on the Roof	distributed under Metro-Goldwyn-Mayer; co-production with The Dan Jinks Company, Harbor Entertainment and Old 320 Sycamore
Freddie the Fix	co-production with K Period Media and Khalabo Ink Society
Fun Home	co-production with Nine Stories Productions
Funny Business	co-production with Counterbalance Entertainment
Game of Pets	co-production with Rideback and Foundation Media Partners
The Gatekeeper	co-production with Di Bonaventura Pictures
Hana Khan Carries On	co-production with Kaling International
Hang the Decorators	co-production with Berlanti/Schechter Films and Invisible String Films
I Am Not Your Perfect Mexican Daughter	distributed under Orion Pictures; co-production with MACRO, Anonymous Content and Aevitas Creative Management
I Do... Not	co-production with Di Bonaventura Pictures
I Used to Eat Brains, Now I Eat Kale	co-production with Open Invite Entertainment
If I Had Your Face	distributed under Orion Pictures; co-production with Concordia Studio and Hopscotch Pictures
Iron Curtain	co-production with Outlier Society
It Takes Two	co-production with Seven Bucks Productions, dj2 Entertainment and Hazelight Studios; distributed under Amazon Prime Video
Jane	co-production with Esperanto Filmoj, Denver and Delilah Productions and Electric Shepherd Productions
Joseph and the Amazing Technicolor Dreamcoat	co-production with SGS Pictures, Electric Somewhere and LW Entertainment
Kill Your Darlings	distributed under United Artists; co-production with Red Om Films and Tribeca Studios
Killing It	
Legally Blonde 3	distributed under Metro-Goldwyn-Mayer; co-production with Marc Platt Productions and Hello Sunshine
Love, Theoretically	co-production with Heartbones Entertainment and Magic Hour Entertainment
Mercy Sparx	distributed under Metro-Goldwyn-Mayer; co-production with Assemble Media, The Picture Company and Devil's Due Publishing
Morning Person	co-production with Welle Entertainment and Arey Cove Media
Moxie	co-production with Palmer Films
Murder 101	co-production with KT Studios
Mysteria	co-production with Secret Menu and Chronology
Nanny Cam	distributed under Orion Pictures; co-production with State Street Pictures
Never Too Old to Die	co-production with Balboa Productions
Night Riders	
No Sleep	co-production with Mortal Media
Office Exchange	co-production with The Safran Company and Nuyorican Productions
Outdueled	co-production with Escape Artists
Play by Play	co-production with Nine Stories Productions and Religion of Sports
Red Shirt	co-production with 87North Productions and Kinberg Genre Films
Repeat After Me	co-production with Premeditated Productions
The Roots Manoeuvre	distributed under Orion Pictures; co-production with BBC Film, Plan B Entertainment and DJ Films
Ruby	co-production with 87North Productions
Sasha	co-production with Berlanti-Schechter Films and These Pictures
Scavenger Hunt	co-production with Balboa Productions
Secret Daughter	co-production with Sunset Lane Media and Purple Pebble Pictures
Shelly	co-production with Ian Bryce Productions
Shield of Sparrows	co-production with Premeditated Productions
Shots! Shots! Shots!	co-production with Rideback
Slow Burn	
Spinster	co-production with Hidden Pictures
Split Fiction	co-production with Story Kitchen, Electric Somewhere and Hazelight Studios
Sporkinfeesten	co-production with Counterbalance Entertainment
Stakehorse	co-production with Perfect Storm Entertainment and Hidden Pictures
Stand In	co-production with Double Dream Productions
The Summer of Broken Rules	co-production with Common Era Projects and Balboa Productions
Survive	co-production with Premeditated Production
T-Minus	co-production with Outlier Society, Point of No Return Films and Electric Shepherd Productions
Teddy Ruxpin	co-production with Seven Bucks Productions and Story Kitchen
Tesseract	distributed under United Artists; co-production with Esmail Corp and Barnstorm
The Beatryce Prophecy	co-production with Netter Films
The Blindings	co-production with 21 Laps Entertainment
The Dwelling	co-production with Outlier Society and Genre Films
The End of Getting Lost	co-production with Tea Time Pictures
The Final Score	co-production with Nine Stories Productions and The Story Factory
The Game of Life	co-production with Chernin Entertainment and Hasbro Entertainment
The Girl in the Lake	distributed under United Artists; co-production with These Pictures and Jack Tar Pictures
The Husbands	co-production with Plan B Entertainment
The Idolmaker	
The Killing Kind	co-production with Maximum Effort
The Last Letter	co-production with Imagine Entertainment and Full Measures
The Mouse and the Motorcycle	co-production with Hobie Films and HarperCollins Productions
The Pirate	co-production with 87North Productions and On the Roam
The Robots Go Crazy	co-production with Party Over Here, Radio Silence Productions and Hyperobject Industries
The Sims	co-production with LuckyChap Entertainment, Vertigo Entertainment and Electronic Arts
The Sweet Spot	
The Tenant	distributed under United Artists; co-production with Something Happy Productions
The Tiger Slam	co-production with Winkler Films and Higher Ground Productions
The Valor	co-production with 87North Productions
Thunderbolt and Lightfoot	co-production with Maximum Effort
Time Zone	co-production with Davis Entertainment
ToeJam & Earl	co-production with Sega and Story Kitchen
Trust the Man	co-production with Invitation Media
Tomb Raider	co-production with dj2 Entertainment
Tough Guys	co-production with Open Invite Entertainment, Gloria Sanchez Productions, and Underground Films
The Two-Body Problem	co-production with MRC
Two Butterflies	co-production with JuVee Productions and Rainforest Entertainment
Untitled Addams Family animated film	distributed under Metro-Goldwyn-Mayer
Untitled Amityville Horror reboot	distributed under Metro-Goldwyn-Mayer; co-production with The Safran Company
Untitled Basic Instinct reboot	distributed under United Artists; co-production with Vault Entertainment
Untitled Bratz film	co-production with MGA Entertainment and Picturestart
Untitled Cyrano Pop film	co-production with Nine Lives Entertainment, Davis Entertainment, and Semi-Formal Productions
Untitled Chitty Chitty Bang Bang remake	distributed under Metro-Goldwyn-Mayer; co-production with Eon Productions
Untitled Evan Gershkovich biopic	distributed under United Artists; co-production with Pascal Pictures
Untitled FBI Wedding Sting Comedy	co-production with AGBO
Untitled firefighter film	co-production with Barnstorm Entertainment and Imagine Entertainment
Untitled George Clinton biopic	co-production with Davis Entertainment
Untitled House of Games remake	co-production with JuVee Productions and House Eleven10
Untitled Jim Jones biopic film	distributed under Metro-Goldwyn-Mayer; co-production with Appian Way Productions
Untitled Kate Warne film	co-production with Seven Bucks Productions and Ledbury Productions
Untitled Keanu Reeves and Sandra Bullock film	co-production with Fortis Films, The Mark Gordon Company and Prologue Entertainment
Untitled Kenny Washington film	co-production with Comet Company, Stay Cool Productions, Entertainment 360 and Awkward Handshake
Untitled Mad Hatter animated film	co-production with Aniventure
Untitled Masters of the Universe sequel	distributed under Metro-Goldwyn-Mayer; co-production with Mattel Studios and Escape Artists; international theatrical distribution by Sony Pictures Releasing International
Untitled Max Barbakow film	co-production with LuckyChap Entertainment, Red Om Films and Echo Films
Untitled Mennomite crime thriller	co-production with Select Films
Untitled My Little Pony live action film	co-production with Hasbro Entertainment
Untitled The Pink Panther reboot	distributed under Metro-Goldwyn-Mayer; co-production with Geoffrey Productions and Rideback
Untitled Plan B remake	co-production with Balboa Productions
Untitled Polly Pocket film	co-production with Mattel Studios and Hello Sunshine
Untitled Squishmallows film	co-production with FlynnPictureCo.
Untitled Thomas & Friends live-action film	co-production with Escape Artists, Mattel Studios and 2DUX²
Untitled The Tomorrow War sequel	co-production with Skydance Media and Paramount Pictures
Untitled 26th James Bond film	distributed under Metro-Goldwyn-Mayer; co-production with Pascal Pictures and Heyday Films
Vineyard Haven	co-production with Berlanti Schechter Films
Untitled WAGs comedy film	distributed under United Artists
Warhammer 40000	co-production with Vertigo Entertainment
Wild Symphony	distributed under Metro-Goldwyn-Mayer; co-production with Weed Road Pictures
Yesteryear	co-production with Somewhere Pictures and Entertainment 360
