= Cas Anvar =

Canadian actor and writer (born 1966)

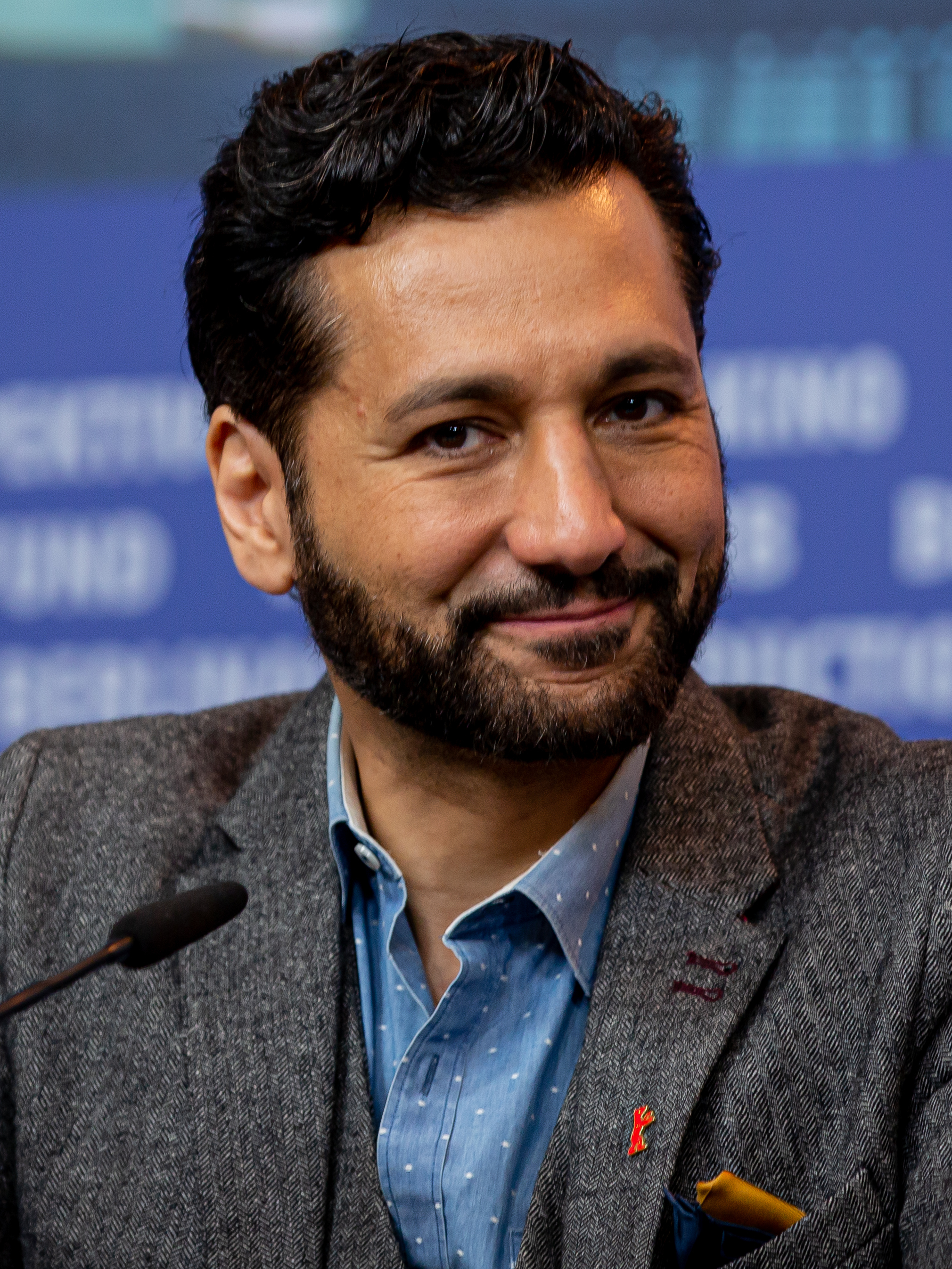
- Anvar in 2019
- Born: 15 March 1966 (age 60); Regina, Saskatchewan, Canada
- Education: National Theatre School
- Occupations: Actor; writer
- Years active: 1988–present
- Known for: Dr Singh in The Tournament; Alex Kamal in The Expanse
- Website: casanvar.com

Cas Anvar (Persian: کاس انور; born 15 March 1966) is a Canadian actor known best for his role in the SyFy/Amazon Prime Video science fiction television series The Expanse.

== Early life and education ==
Anvar was born in Regina, Saskatchewan, to Iranian parents. They moved to Montreal, Quebec, where he was raised. He graduated from Beaconsfield High School in 1983.

He became interested in acting after playing Hamlet in a high school production of Shakespeare's play. Anvar has said that after early studies of psychology and sciences at McGill University, he changed fields and graduated from the National Theatre School in 1989.

== Career ==
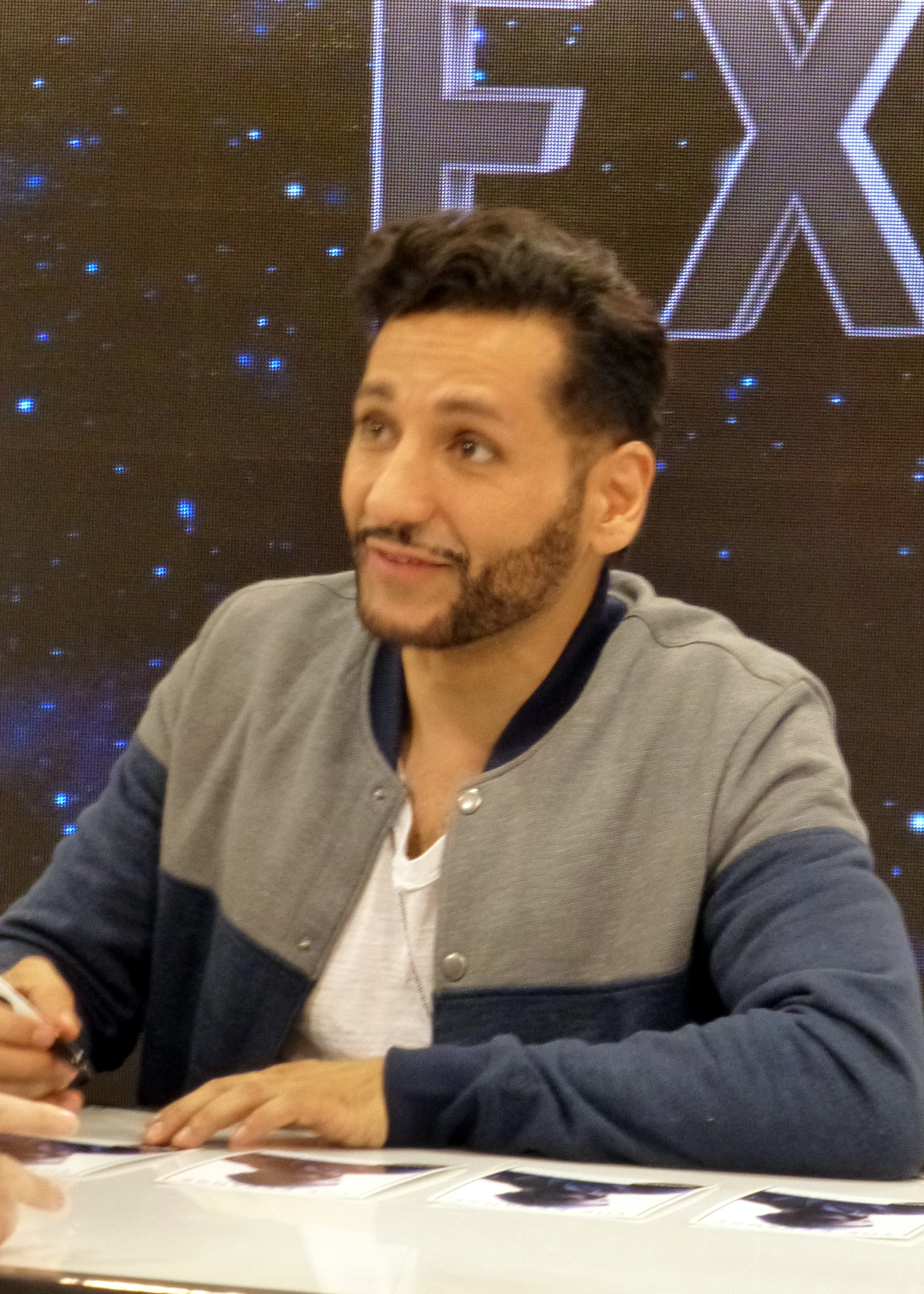
Anvar at the 2015 Fan Expo Canada

He was founding artistic director of Repercussion Theatre. Anvar told CBC Radio's Saskatoon Morning that he founded the company in order to avoid being typecast, so that he could cast himself in the roles he wanted to play. Since 1988 the company toured parks of Montreal, and then throughout North America, with the annual Shakespeare in the Park Festival. Meanwhile, he continued performing in theatre.

In 1992, he debuted in Urban Angel, and has continued to perform roles in television and film.

Anvar starred as journalist Kambiz Foroohar in the 2003 film Shattered Glass.

Anvar guest-starred in an episode of NCIS that premiered in 2007.

In 2011, he voiced Altaïr Ibn-La'Ahad in Assassin's Creed: Revelations. In the same year, he co-starred with Jake Gyllenhaal in the science fiction film Source Code.

Anvar also appeared alongside John Cusack and Jennifer Carpenter in the horror film The Factory.

Anvar was part of the cast of Argo, which won the SAG Award for Best Cast Performance in 2013. Anvar appeared as Dodi Fayed with Naomi Watts in the film Diana in 2013.

Anvar starred in the science fiction television series The Expanse as Alex Kamal. It was first broadcast in December 2015. Anvar co-starred in the 2015 Oscar-nominated film Room. Anvar also starred in the 2015 mythological drama series Olympus, which aired on Syfy.

In 2016, he joined season 3 of The Strain as Sanjay Desai.

Anvar starred in the independent drama The Lie, an English-language adaptation of the German film Wir Monster, which premiered at the Toronto International Film Festival in 2018. In the same year, Anvar starred alongside Diane Kruger in the thriller The Operative.

In 2019, he had a recurring role on How To Get Away With Murder as Robert Hseih.

In November 2020, Alcon announced that Anvar would not be returning for the sixth and final season of The Expanse.

In 2021, Anvar had a guest-role on the television series FBI: International.

In 2024, Anvar had a supporting role in the comedy film Doin’ It, starring Lilly Singh.

Anvar appeared in director Marc Furmie's 2025 action drama Viper as Rafiq “Razor” Alizai.

== Personal life ==
Anvar is fluent in English, French, and Persian, and also speaks some Arabic, Hindi, and Spanish.

== Sexual misconduct allegations ==
In June 2020, Alcon Entertainment hired an independent firm to investigate over 30 allegations of sexual harassment and assault made against Anvar. Anvar released a statement in response indicating his intent to cooperate with the investigation, saying that the accusers should be heard, but that he intended to clear his name. The report was never released and no charges or civil actions against Anvar were ever filed.

== Filmography ==
=== Film ===
Year	Title	Role	Notes
1995	Witchboard III: The Possession	Paramedic #1	
1997	Afterglow	Frederico	
1998	Twist of Fate	Goldwin	
1998	The Incredible Adventures of Marco Polo	Youssef	
1998	Sublet	Nightclub Man	
2000	Seducing Maarya	Zakir	
2001	Cause of Death	Leonard Sheck	
2001	Hidden Agenda	Agent McCoomb	
2002	Wrong Number	Thomas Pitrillo	
2003	Comment ma mère accoucha de moi durant sa ménopause	Médecin, examen gynéco	
2003	Shattered Glass	Kambiz Foroohar	
2003	Timeline	E.R. Doctor	
2004	The Terminal	CBP Officer #3	
2008	Punisher: War Zone	Plastic Surgeon	
2009	Transformers: Revenge of the Fallen	Egyptian Interpol Officer #1	
2011	Source Code	Hazmi	
2012	Argo	Revolutionary Guard	
2012	The Factory	Phil	Uncredited
2012	The Son of an Afghan Farmer	Michael	
2013	Diana	Dodi Fayed	
2013	The Factory	Phil	
2014	Fall	Reza	
2015	Miss India America	Deep Panday	
2015	The Vatican Tapes	Dr. Fahti	
2015	Room	Dr Mittal	
2017	Nobility	Captain Eric Cern	
2018	The Lie	Sam Ismali	
2019	The Operative	Farhad	
2019	Batman vs. Teenage Mutant Ninja Turtles	Ra's al Ghul	Voice
2019	Draupadi Unleashed	Manu	
2024	Doin' It	Farhad	
2025	Viper	Rafiq “Razor” Alizai	
2026	Foreign Tongue	Faroukh	

=== Television ===
Year	Title	Role	Notes
1991–2005	Watatatow	Atys	Main role
1998	La Femme Nikita	Halir	Episode: "Old Habits"
2005	The Tournament	Dr. Singh	Main role, 17 episodes
2007	NCIS	Masoud Tariq	Television TV series, Season 4 Episode 12
2009	The Phantom	Rhatib Singh	Television miniseries
2009	24	Dr. Wyndham	Television TV series
2010	Lost	Omer Jarrah	Episode: "Sundown"
2011	Leverage	Oscar San Guillermo	Episode 4.15: "The Lonely Hearts Job"
2011	Neverland	Gentleman Starkey	Television miniseries
2011–2012	Xeno-Date	Sirus	Webseries, 8 episodes
2014	Castle	Dr. Rampanel	Episode: "Smells Like Teen Spirit"
2014	Intelligence	Ibrahim Al-Munin	Episode: "Red X"
2015	Olympus	Xerxes	Recurring role, 7 episodes
2015–2021	The Expanse	Alex Kamal	Main role, 56 episodes
2016–2017	The Strain	Sanjay Desai	Recurring role, 10 episodes
2019–2020	How To Get Away with Murder	Robert Hsieh	Recurring role, 4 episodes
2020	Cardinal	Taj Roy	Episode 4.02: "Adele"
2021	FBI: International	Ali Majidi	Episode 1.06: "The Secrets She Knows"
2023	Gwen Shamblin: Starving for Salvation	Seller	Television film

=== Internet video ===
Year	Title	Role	Notes
2017	Star Trek Continues	Sentek	Episodes: "To Boldly Go" Part 1; "To Boldly Go" Part 2

=== Video games ===
Year	Title	Role	Notes	Ref.
2011	Assassin's Creed: Revelations	Altaïr Ibn-LaʼAhad	Voice role	
2012	Call of Duty: Black Ops II	Mullah Rahmaan	Voice role	
2012	Halo 4	Dalton	Voice role	
