= Evil Eye (2020 film) =

2020 American horror film

- Official release poster
- Directed by: Elan Dassani; Rajeev Dassani
- Screenplay by: Madhuri Shekar
- Based on: Evil Eye by Madhuri Shekar
- Produced by: Ian Watermeier; Nina Anand Aujla
- Starring: Sarita Choudhury; Sunita Mani; Omar Maskati; Bernard White
- Cinematography: Yaron Levy
- Edited by: Kristina Hamilton-Grobler
- Music by: Ronit Kirchman
- Production companies: Blumhouse Television; Purple Pebble Pictures
- Distributed by: Amazon Studios
- Release date: October 13, 2020
- Running time: 90 minutes
- Country: United States
- Language: English
- Budget: $5 million

Evil Eye is a 2020 American supernatural horror film directed by Elan and Rajeev Dassani and written by Madhuri Shekar, based on her Audible Original audio play of the same name. The film stars Sarita Choudhury, Sunita Mani and Omar Maskati. It was executive produced by Jason Blum of Blumhouse Television and Priyanka Chopra Jonas of Purple Pebble Pictures.

Evil Eye was released on October 13, 2020, by Amazon Studios, as the third installment in the anthological Welcome to the Blumhouse film series.

== Plot ==
Aspiring writer Pallavi lives in New Orleans and has a close but contentious relationship with her mother Usha. Worried for her unmarried daughter, and interested in vedic astrology, Usha tries to set Pallavi up on arranged dates.

After being stood up at one such blind date, Pallavi instead meets another man, Sandeep, and they begin dating. Sandeep seems perfect for her: handsome, wealthy, and Indian. When discussing their romantic pasts, Sandeep tells her that a former girlfriend tried to commit suicide when they broke up. When Pallavi rejects Sandeep's gift - a pair of earrings - she sees his hands clench seemingly in anger, but thinks nothing of it.

Informed of Pallavi's new boyfriend, Usha is concerned instead of overjoyed. While an astrologer tells her the two have unprecedented compatibility, the hired private investigator reports a string of former girlfriends who are reluctant to talk about Sandeep.

After Pallavi refuses Sandeep's invitation to move in with him, he offers to pay her rent on a new apartment, allowing her to quit her job and focus on writing. Pallavi agrees, but Usha believes Sandeep is gaining control over her life. When Pallavi says he is doing this for her own good, that line reminds Usha of her own abusive ex-boyfriend. She suspects that he, who had died on the night Pallavi was born, has reincarnated into Sandeep. Usha tries to convince Pallavi to leave Sandeep, but Pallavi and everyone else thinks she is insane.

When Pallavi gets engaged to Sandeep, Usha has a breakdown. At her husband's urgings, she agrees to give Sandeep a chance. She confides in Pallavi about her past: before she got married she had dated a man who was controlling and abusive. After she broke up with him and married someone else, he would stalk her. One night, when she was eight months pregnant, he attacked her on a bridge. In the struggle, she pushed him into the river and went into labor that night, giving birth to Pallavi. She was never connected to the ex-boyfriend's death.

Sandeep calls Usha and admits that her suspicions are correct: he is the reincarnation of her former boyfriend. He demands that she travel to the United States to meet him in person. When she arrives, Sandeep tells her that he wants what he has always wanted: her. He warns her that if she tries to stop the marriage, he will kill Pallavi. When the three have dinner together, Pallavi becomes suspicious that her fussy mother has suddenly become so supportive. Usha reveals that she has the same set of earrings Sandeep gave to Pallavi, a gift from her ex. Sandeep becomes enraged and attacks Usha. The two women fight him off and injure him.

At the hospital, realizing her mother was right, Pallavi worries about the future, and what might happen with her potential daughters. Usha comforts her as down the hall, Sandeep dies. The final shot shows a newborn baby.

== Cast ==
- Sarita Choudhury as Usha
- Sunita Mani as Pallavi
- Bernard White as Krishnan
- Omar Maskati as Sandeep
- Anjali Bhimani as Radhika

== Production ==
Filming took place in New Orleans from November to December 2019.

== Release ==
The film was released on October 13, 2020 alongside Nocturne as one of the first four films in the eight film anthology Welcome to the Blumhouse, after Nocturne, The Lie, and Black Box.

== Reception ==
On review aggregator Rotten Tomatoes, the film holds an approval rating of 44% based on 54 reviews, with an average rating of 5.4/10. The website's critics consensus reads: "With Evil Eye, directors Elan and Rajeev Dassani spy a premise that has no shortage of potential, but despite the efforts of a game cast, it remains tantalizingly unfulfilled." On Metacritic has a weighted average score of 54 out of 100, based on nine critics, indicating "mixed or average" reviews.
