= International Star Registry =

American novelty company

- Type: Private
- Industry: Novelty item, memorabilia
- Founded: 1979; 47 years ago
- Founders: Ivor Downie
- Products: Certificates, kits
- Services: Unofficial star naming
- Website: www.starregistry.com

International Star Registry (ISR) is an organization founded in 1979 for the purpose of giving the general public the ability to unofficially name a star.

== Overview ==
The company sells the right to unofficially name a star and buy a star package of your choice, often as a gift or memorial. These names are recorded in the book Your Place in the Cosmos, and are not recognized by the scientific or astronomical community as the International Astronomical Union is the only internationally recognized authority for naming celestial bodies. Some astronomers have criticized International Star Registry for not conforming to the IAU's designations while others, like Edward Bowell, approved of it. The company's director of marketing Elaine Stolpe stated that "the service is not intended for scientific research; it is intended as a lasting gift."

Since its founding, International Star Registry has catalogued individual stars using coordinate data. It previously used data from the Smithsonian Astrophysical Observatory Star Catalog, before switching to using data from the NASA Star Guide, which allowed them to locate stars down to the 16th magnitude. The stars are catalogued on charts stored at International Star Registry headquarters, and a catalogue of named stars is stored in a vault in Switzerland.

When customers "buy a star" package they are given a signed certificate, a booklet of star charts, and a chart identifying the named star. Packages sold by the company include framed certificates and personalized jewelry. The text of the certificates, with its blank spaces filled in by hand, is:

Know ye herewith that the International Star Registry doth hereby redesignate star number _____ to the name _____. Know ye further that this star will henceforth be known by this name. This name is permanently filed in The Registry's vault in Switzerland and recorded in a book which will be registered in the copyright office of the United States of America.

== History ==
International Star Registry of Illinois was started in Toronto in 1979 by Ivor Downie, and is thought to be the earliest commercial star naming company. That year, the Toronto International Film Festival announced that it had purchased the naming rights to stars in the Andromeda Galaxy from the company, and would be naming them after festival patrons. In 1980, John and Phyllis Mosele bought an American franchise of the company. Phyllis had first learned of the company when she named a star for her husband as a gift.

The American company quickly grew in popularity, appearing on AM Chicago and Wally Phillips' WGN Morning Show. The Moseles purchased sole ownership in 1981 after Downie's death. The present owner of the company is Rocky Mosele, one of John and Phyllis Mosele's twelve children. The company has published nine large volumes of the copyrighted book named Your Place in the Cosmos.

After the 1986 Space Shuttle Challenger disaster, the city of Daytona Beach named a star after each of the seven astronauts who died in the accident through the ISR.

In 1998, International Star Registry was issued a complaint by the New York City Department of Consumer Affairs for deceptive advertising for claiming "official" naming rights. The Illinois Attorney General later found that the company had done no wrongdoing. International Star Registry's FAQ states that only the International Astronomical Union has the right to name stars.

In 1999, the Delaware Museum of Natural History held a contest to name the star TYC 3429-697-1 in the Ursa Major constellation, after the museum purchased naming rights from International Star Registry. The star was named the "Delaware Diamond", derived from Delaware's nickname "The Diamond State". Despite the nickname not having any scientific validity, a bill recognizing it as the official star of the State of Delaware was passed unanimously by the Delaware General Assembly in 2000.

International Star Registry named a star after each victim of the September 11 attacks as a memorial.

John Smith's Brewery named stars in a pint glass-shaped constellation after fans who won a competition in 2015. As of 2017, the company had reportedly named over two million stars names.

Jack in the Box partnered with the company to nickname a constellation, shaped like the fast food chain's mascot, after various food items offered by the franchise. The promotion was intended to celebrate the dual occurrence of Star Wars Day and National Space Day in May 2018. That same year, the company ran a promotion with the Sprint Corporation for customers who purchased a Samsung Galaxy S9 or S9+.

In 2019, as the series The Big Bang Theory neared its finale, Warner Bros. Television Studios announced that the ISR had nicknamed the Big Dipper constellation "The Big Bang Dipper" in honor of the show. Disney+ commemorated the launch of the Star content hub in February 2021 by naming several stars in International Star Registry.

== In popular culture ==
The company has also appeared in numerous films and television series. In the 2002 romantic coming-of-age film A Walk to Remember depicts a young man (Shane West) naming a star after his girlfriend (Mandy Moore) through International Star Registry. International Star Registry appeared in the American Dad! episode "I Ain't No Holodeck Boy", when Hayley buys Roger's homestar, and claims to be his queen as a result.

A 1992 Time magazine article noted that the company had become popular with celebrities and politicians, with Elizabeth II, Charles III, and Diana, Princess of Wales receiving stars. Some stars have been nicknamed as a memorial, such as when William Baldwin nicknamed a star after John F. Kennedy Jr., in the wake of the latter's death. Nicole Kidman named a star in the Hercules constellation "Forever Tom" in the listing, after her husband Tom Cruise. Winona Ryder also named a star after her then-boyfriend Johnny Depp.

Other public figures who have had stars named for them include Barry Manilow, Engelbert Humperdinck, Donald Trump, Hillary Clinton, and Lindsey Graham. Del E. Webb Construction Company named a star after Marco Rubio in 1993. Actor Kirk Douglas had a star named after him for his 99th birthday in 2015.

In 2012, Anderson Cooper presented guest John Cusack, who had just received a star on the Hollywood Walk of Fame, with a star named after him in International Star Registry. Ellen DeGeneres presented 5-year old Xander Rynerson with a star named after him on a 2020 episode of The Ellen DeGeneres Show. In a 2020 episode of Jimmy Kimmel Live!, Patrick Stewart had a star named for him after defeating Pete Buttigieg in a Star Trek trivia match.

At the 2015 Academy Awards, nominees were given stars named in their honor and hardcover copies of Your Place in the Cosmos, Vol. 10, inside of their Oscar gift bags.

== Bibliography ==
- Your Place in the Cosmos, Volume I. 1985. 530 pages. ISBN 0-9614354-0-2
- Your Place in the Cosmos, Volume II. 1988. 508 pages. ISBN 0-9614354-1-0
- Your Place in the Cosmos, Volume III. 1992. 388 pages. ISBN 0-9614354-2-9
- Your Place in the Cosmos, Volume IV. 1996. 502 pages. ISBN 0-9614354-3-7
- Your Place in the Cosmos, Volume V. 1999. 680 pages. ISBN 0-9614354-4-5
- Your Place in the Cosmos, Volume VI. 2002. 717 pages. ISBN 0-9614354-5-3
- Your Place in the Cosmos, Volume VII. 2004. 773 pages. ISBN 0-9614354-6-1
- Your Place in the Cosmos, Volume VIII. 2007. 652 pages. ISBN 0-9614354-7-X
- Your Place in the Cosmos, Volume IX. 2013. 943 pages. ISBN 0-9614354-8-8
- Your Place in the Cosmos, Volume X. 2017. 738 pages. ISBN 0-9614354-9-6
- Your Place in the Cosmos, Volume XI. 2024.

== See also ==
- Extraterrestrial real estate
- Star designation
