= The Michael's Daughter Foundation =

The Michael's Daughter Foundation is an American non-profit organization based in California. It was founded by the actress and writer Ciera Payton in 2013 and provides services to youth and families in Los Angeles, particularly those affected by incarceration.

The foundation grew out of Payton's experiences growing up with an incarcerated father. She performed a one-woman stage play Michael's Daughter which was based on having an incarcerated father. She began arts based workshops for underserved youth in Los Angeles in 2013. In 2014, she received a Los Angeles Department of Cultural Affairs grant for Michael's Daughter Project.

The project was subsequently evolved into The Michael's DaughterFoundation, expanding Payton's art education for underserved youth and families going through incarceration. The foundation has received grants from California Arts Council for programs including filmmaking, theater, financial literacy, and other art workshops.
