= Charmaine Bingwa =

Australian actress (born 1985)

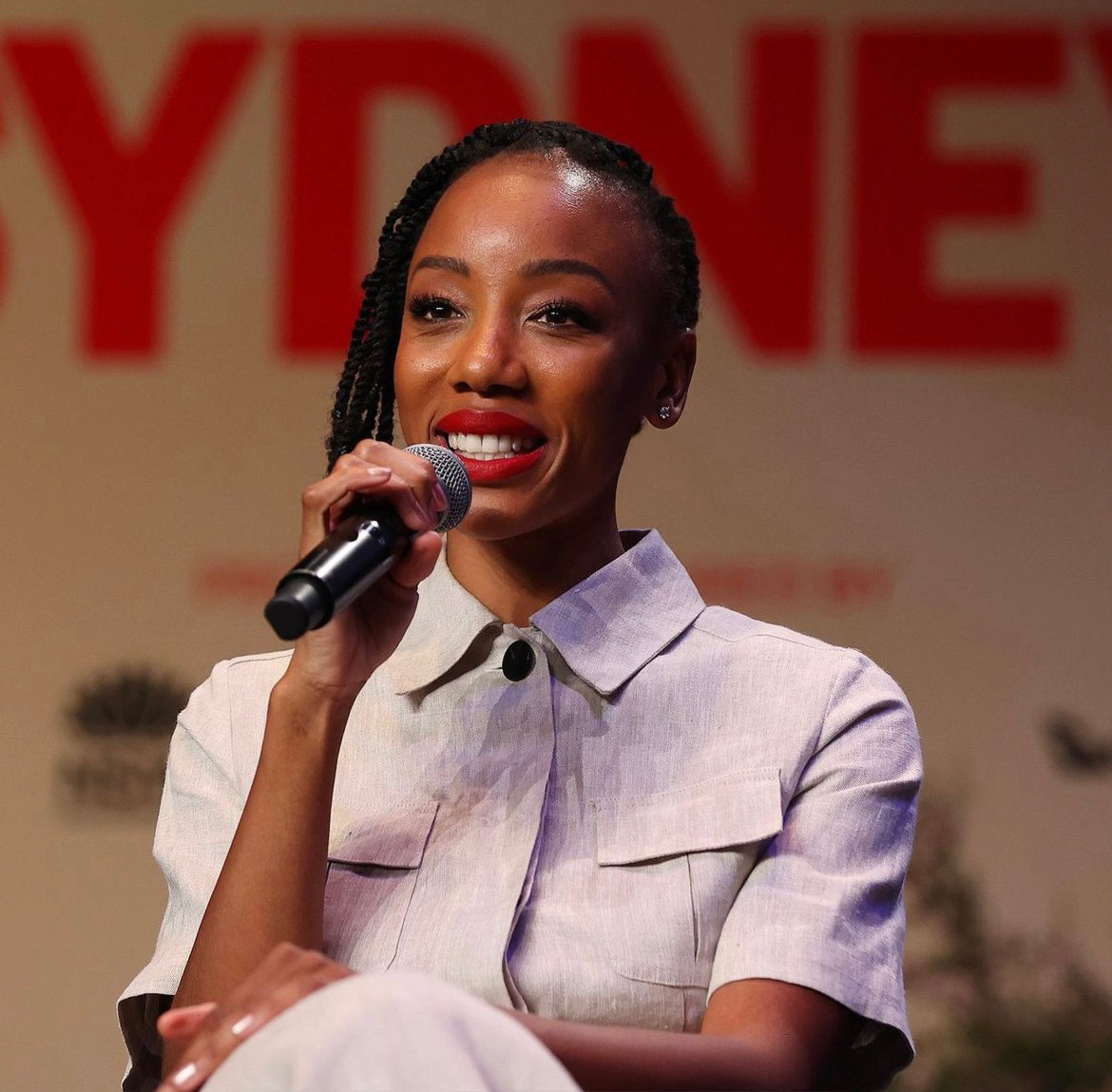
- Born: 13 November 1985 (age 40); Perth, Western Australia, Australia
- Education: Australian Institute of Music
- Occupation: Actress
- Years active: 2013–present
- Awards: Heath Ledger Scholarship

Charmaine Bingwa (born 13 November 1985) is an Australian actress. She is known for her role as Carmen Moyo in the CBS series The Good Fight (2021–2022). She has appeared in films including Black Box (2020) and Emancipation, alongside Will Smith. Bingwa won the 2018 Heath Ledger Scholarship award.

== Life and career ==
Bingwa was born in Perth, Western Australia. She is the daughter of Zimbabwean immigrants to Australia. She attended school at Santa Maria College. After attaining a business degree, Bingwa worked in the corporate world.

Bingwa returned to university to pursue a Bachelor of Music at the Australian Institute of Music in Sydney. She took acting as one of her final electives. She completed the acting course in addition to her music degree and signed with an acting agent soon after graduating.

She won critical acclaim for her performance in the stage play Doubt: A Parable, starring as Mrs. Muller, for which she received a Sydney Theatre Awards nomination. In 2018, Bingwa won the Australian Media, Entertainment and Arts Alliance Scholarship to study at the Atlantic Theater Company in New York and then won the Heath Ledger Scholarship, becoming the first woman of colour and openly gay recipient.

Bingwa starred, wrote, produced and co-directed the series Little Sista, which won the Best Screenplay at the LGBT Toronto Film Festival. She has also starred in the 2020 science fiction horror film Black Box as Miranda Brooks, part of Amazon's Welcome to the Blumhouse anthology film series. She voiced Felicia Cox in both seasons of QCode's podcast, The Burned Photo.

Her role as Carmen Moyo in the legal drama The Good Fight was acclaimed as a "gust of chilly Chicago wind, quickly letting you know who's boss here"; she "made a splash upon joining Reddick & Associates", the fictional Chicago law firm in which she plays a talented, quick-witted, cool, gay, and morally complex junior lawyer. Many labelled Bingwa as "the season’s standout performer" in The Good Fight Season 6.

She starred in Antoine Fuqua's film Emancipation (2022) as Dodienne, wife of Peter (Will Smith). She received critical praise for being “unflinching as the film’s emotional pillar" and "incredibly moving," many even hoped "the Academy won’t overlook such a breakout talent."

Bingwa was to have starred as Isisa, a warrior in Showtime's King Shaka, also executive produced by Fuqua, but the series was dropped by the network in April 2023 due to a programming overhaul.

== Filmography ==
- 2018: Nekrotronic
- 2018: Hello Au Revoir
- 2018 Stille Nacht (short film) (writer)
- 2018: Little Sista (TV series, 7 episodes, also writer, producer and director)
- 2019: In the Shadows (short film) (writer, director, and actor)
- 2020: Black Box
- 2021: The Pitch
- 2021: The Good Fight (TV series)
- 2022: Emancipation
- 2022: Trees of Peace
- 2022: KAPŌ

== Awards ==
Year	Award	Category	Work	Result	Ref
2018	Heath Ledger Scholarship	Scholarship Award	Film	Won	
