= Lords of the Street =

- Directed by: Amir Valinia
- Written by: Kane & Abel; Anthony Faia III; Sheldon Robins
- Produced by: DMX; Kane & Abel
- Starring: Kris Kristofferson; DMX; Ameer Baraka; Kane; Abel
- Cinematography: Tom Banks
- Edited by: Amir Valinia
- Music by: Mary Alice Corton
- Distributed by: Dan Garcia Films; Most Wanted Films; Peace Arch Entertainment Group
- Release date: January 18, 2008
- Running time: 83 minutes
- Country: United States
- Language: English

Lords of the Street, also known as Jump Out Boys, is a 2008 action film starring DMX and Kris Kristofferson, written and produced by David and Daniel Garcia, better known as Kane & Abel and directed by Amir Valinia. The film takes place in New Orleans, Louisiana after Hurricane Katrina. Sheldon Robins and Veronica Berry also star in the film.

== Plot summary ==
A Mexican drug lord escaped from prison to retrieve $15 million, but two cops (Sheldon Robins and Kristofferson) are sent after him.

== Cast ==
- DMX as Vogler
- Kris Kristofferson as Raymond
- Alec Rayme as Jimmy
- Sheldon Robins as Detective McCoy
- Veronica Berry as Myesha
- Ciera Payton as Maria
- Ameer Baraka as Travis Roundtree
- Kane as Thug Twin #1
- Abel as Thug Twin #2
