= Omar Maskati =

American actor (born 1989)

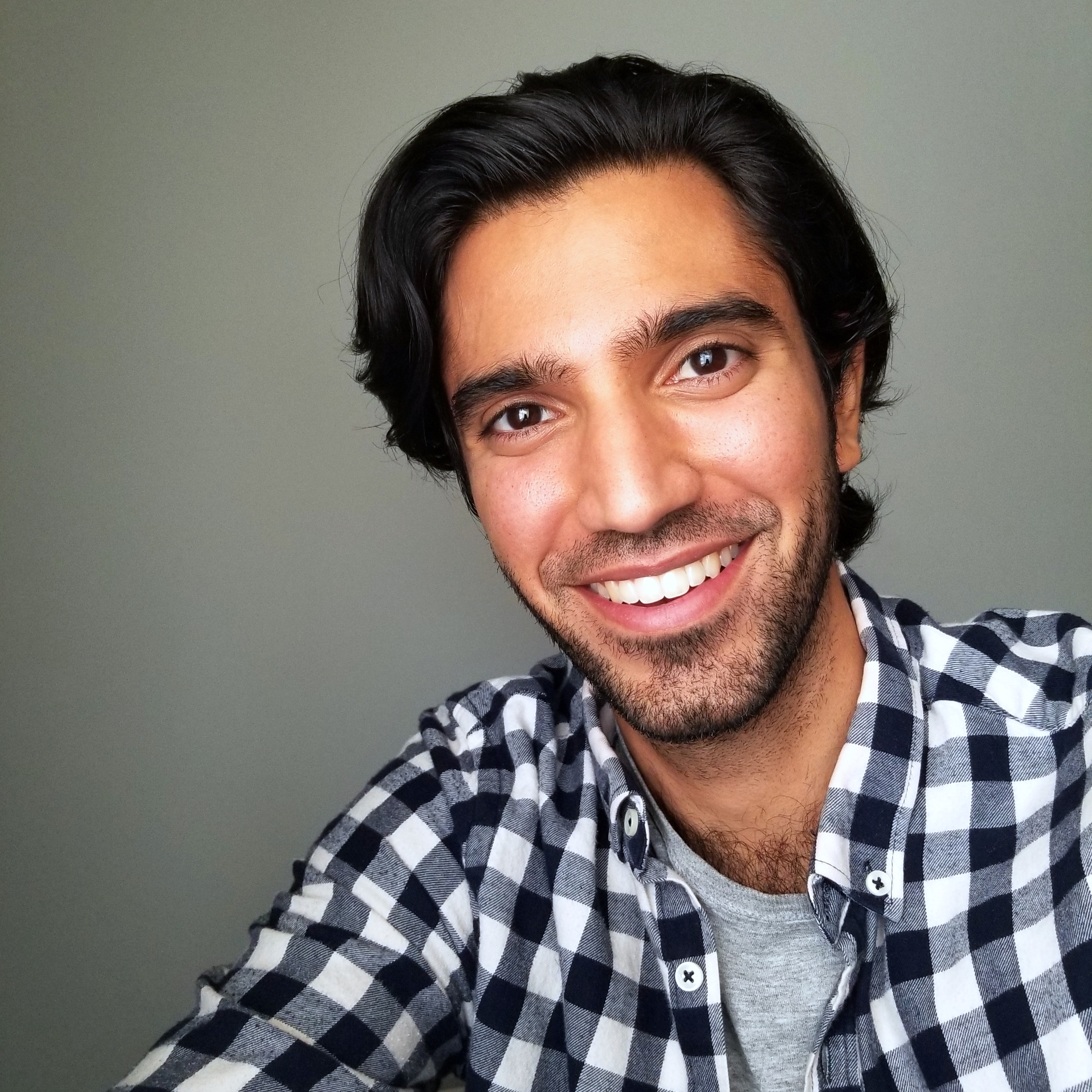
- Maskati in 2021
- Born: September 19, 1989 (age 36); Edison, New Jersey, U.S.
- Education: University of Pennsylvania
- Occupation: Actor
- Years active: 2013–present

Omar Maskati (born September 19, 1989) is an American actor known for his roles in Better Call Saul and Unbelievable. He has also starred in Evil Eye and The Recruit.

== Early life ==
Maskati was born and raised in Edison, New Jersey to a Muslim Indian Marathi father and a Puerto Rican mother. His father is Muslim and his mother is Catholic and he considered himself both Muslim and Catholic in high school. He graduated as salutatorian from Edison High School in 2007. In 2011, he received a degree in engineering from University of Pennsylvania, where he also minored in theater arts and was a member of the Mask and Wig Club. He chose acting as a career after graduation.

== Filmography ==
=== Film ===
Year	Title	Role	Notes
2015	Jack of the Red Hearts	Junior	
2015	Secret Agent Danny Jumbalaya	Evil Leprechaun (voice)	Short film
2018	Nigerian Prince	Raju	
2020	Evil Eye	Sandeep	
2021	Uncle	Haris	Short film, also co–producer
2021	Camcorder	Kenny Rios	Short film
2021	Sand & Snow	Zayn / Aydin	

=== Television ===
Year	Title	Role	Notes
2013	Blue Bloods	Hector Santiago	2 episodes
2014	Believe	Karim	Episode: "Origin"
2015	Person of Interest	Naresh Prasad	Episode: "Q & A"
2015	Tyrant	Marwan	7 episodes
2016	The Good Wife	Saum Binazir	Episode: "Judged"
2016	Better Call Saul	Omar	7 episodes (season 2)
2016	BrainDead	Ahmed Kadhimiya	Episode: "The Path to War Part One"
2017	Brown Girls	Shaan	TV movie
2017	Bull	Jace Rundle	Episode: "The Fall"
2017	Time After Time	Martin	10 episodes
2017	Broad City	Mike	2 episodes
2018	Quantico	Khaled	Episode: "Spy Games"
2018	Revenge Tour	Derek "Milkshake" Qamar	TV short, also producer
2018	Kidding	Xander	Episode: "Bye, Mom"
2019	The Resident	Evan Watson	Episode: "Betrayal"
2019	Unbelievable	Elias	6 episodes
2019	NCIS: Los Angeles	Adnan Das	Episode: "Hail Mary"
2020	68 Whiskey	Qasem	8 episodes
2021	The Handmaid's Tale	Steven	2 episodes
2022	As We See It	Joel	Main cast
2022	Good Sam	Dr. Isan M. Shah	Main cast
2024	The Equalizer	Eric	S4.ep5 and S4.ep10 "Shattered"
2025	The Recruit	Jay King	Main cast
2025	Étoile	Julian	5 episodes
