= Welcome to the Blumhouse =

Horror anthology film series

- Official film series logo
- Edited by: Bob Bowen
- Music by: Alexandra Petkovski
- Production company: Blumhouse Productions
- Distributed by: Amazon Prime Originals
- Country: United States
- Language: English

Welcome to the Blumhouse is a film series consisting of theme-related anthological horror stories, developed and produced by Blumhouse Productions for Prime Video as Amazon Prime Originals. Announced as an ongoing collaboration between the companies, the films include "distinctive vision[s] and unique perspective[s] on common themes". The first four incorporate "family and love as redemptive or destructive forces", while the next four releases center around "institutional horrors and personal phobias."

The first four films in the anthology series were advertised and streamable as double features; the first two films on October 6, followed by the next two installments on October 13, 2020. The series continued in 2021, with two movies released on October 1, and the next two released on October 8.

== Films ==
Welcome to the Blumhouse films
| Film | U.S. release date | Directed by | Screenplay by | Story by | Produced by |
|---|---|---|---|---|---|
| The Lie | October 6, 2020 | Veena Sud | Veena Sud | Veena Sud | Alix Madigan-Yorkin, Christopher Tricarico and Jason Blum |
| Black Box | October 6, 2020 | Emmanuel Osei-Kuffour Jr. | Emmanuel Osei-Kuffour Jr. & Stephen Herman | Emmanuel Osei-Kuffour Jr. & Stephen Herman | John H. Brister and Jason Blum |
| Evil Eye | October 13, 2020 | Elan Dassani & Rajeev Dassani | Elan Dassani & Rajeev Dassani | Madhuri Shekar | Anjula Archaria, Jason Blum, Lisa Bruce, Priyanka Chopra, Jeremy Gold, Emilia Lapenta, Kate Lavin, Guy Stodel, Ian Watermeier and Marci Wiseman |
| Nocturne | October 13, 2020 | Zu Quirke | Zu Quirke | Zu Quirke | Jason Blum, Lisa Bruce, Jeremy Gold and Marci Wiseman |
| Bingo Hell | October 1, 2021 | Gigi Saul Guerrero | Shane McKenzie & Gigi Saul Guerrero and Perry Blackshear | Shane McKenzie & Gigi Saul Guerrero and Perry Blackshear | Jason Blum, Jeremy Gold, Marci Wiseman and Raynor Shima |
| Black as Night | October 1, 2021 | Maritte Lee Go | Sherman Payne | Sherman Payne | Jason Blum, Jeremy Gold, Marci Wiseman, Lisa Bruce, Maggie Malina and Guy Stodel |
| Madres | October 8, 2021 | Ryan Zaragoza | Marcella Ochoa & Mario Miscione | Marcella Ochoa & Mario Miscione | Jason Blum, Jeremy Gold, Marci Wiseman, Lisa Bruce, Sanjay Sharma and Matthew Myers |
| The Manor | October 8, 2021 | Axelle Carolyn | Axelle Carolyn | Axelle Carolyn | Jason Blum, Jeremy Gold, Marci Wiseman, Lisa Bruce, Sandy King and Richard J. Bosner |

=== The Lie (2018) ===
After their teenage daughter claims to have killed her best friend on impulse, two parents desperately cover up the crime. The couple navigates the deception through a complicated web of lies.

=== Black Box (2020) ===
After losing his wife and his memory in a horrific car accident, a single father suffers through a painful experimental treatment. Memories begin to slowly resurface, causing him to question his real character.

=== Evil Eye (2020) ===
A perceived ideal relationship turns into the events of nightmares when a mother becomes obsessed with the belief that her daughter's new boyfriend is a man with a dark history from her own past. Based on the best-selling and award-winning Audible Original by Madhuri Shekar.

=== Nocturne (2020) ===
At a prestigious arts academy, a reserved and shy music student discovers a mysterious notebook that belonged to a recently deceased classmate. Upon following its contents, she begins to outperform her talented and outgoing twin sister, though things may not be as they appear.

=== Bingo Hell (2021) ===
Directed by Gigi Saul Guerrero, from a script she co-wrote with Shane McKenzie and Perry Blackshear, the story features a group of elderly friends in Oak Springs, who refuse to change and be modernized. Together with their leader, Lupita, the friends are as close-knit as family in their community. These senior citizens don't realize that their bingo hall is being sold to a force more powerful than money.

=== Black as Night (2021) ===
Directed by Maritte Lee Go, from a script written by Sherman Payne, the plot centers around a teenaged black girl with low self-esteem who finds confidence upon hunting vampires in New Orleans, with the help of a few of her peers.

=== Madres (2021) ===
Directed by Ryan Zaragoza in his directorial debut, from a script co-written by Marcella Ochoa and Mario Miscione, the plot, set during the 1970s, follows a Mexican-American couple who are approaching the due date for their firstborn child. After moving to a farming community in California, the wife develops unusual symptoms with accompanying horrific visions. Together they try to determine if these strange occurrences are related to a legendary curse, or something more evil.

=== The Manor (2021) ===
Written and directed by Axelle Carolyn, the plot involves a woman named Judith Albright, who recently suffered a stroke and is moved into a prolific nursing home, where she begins to believe that a supernatural force is preying on the residents. In order to escape this threat, Judith must first convince everyone around her that she doesn't need the assisted living.

== Additional crew and production details ==
| Film | Crew/Detail | | | | | |
| Film | Composer(s) | Cinematographer | Editor(s) | Production companies | Distributing companies | Running time |
|---|---|---|---|---|---|---|
| The Lie | Tamar-kali | Peter Wunstorf | Phil Fowler | Blumhouse Productions, Mad Dog Films, Bitter Boy Productions Ltd. | Amazon Prime Video | 97 minutes |
| Black Box | Brandon Roberts | Hilda Mercado | Glenn Garland | Amazon Studios, Blumhouse Productions, Blumhouse Television, Black Bar Mitzvah | Amazon Prime Video | 100 minutes |
| Evil Eye | Ronit Kirchman | Yaron Levy | Kristina Hamilton-Grobler | Amazon Studios, Blumhouse Productions, Blumhouse Television | Amazon Prime Video | 89 minutes |
| Nocturne | Ryan Neil | Carmen Cabana | Andrew Drazek | Amazon Studios, Blumhouse Productions, Blumhouse Television | Amazon Prime Video | 90 minutes |
| Bingo Hell | Chase Horseman | Byron Werner | Andrew Wesman | Amazon Studios, Blumhouse Productions, Blumhouse Television, Luchagore Productions | Amazon Prime Video | 85 minutes |
| Black as Night | Jacques Bridal Bar | Cybel Martin | Tim Mirkovich | Amazon Studios, Blumhouse Television | Amazon Prime Video | 87 minutes |
| Madres | Isabelle Engman-Bredvik & Gerardo Garcia Jr. | Felipe Vara de Rey | Kristina Hamilton-Grobler | Amazon Studios, Blumhouse Productions, Blumhouse Television, Marginal Mediaworks | Amazon Prime Video | 83 minutes |
| The Manor | Christopher Drake | Andrés Sánchez | Kristina Hamilton-Grobler & Robert Hoffman | Amazon Studios, Blumhouse Productions, Blumhouse Television | Amazon Prime Video | 91 minutes |

== Reception ==
Critical and public response
| Film | Rotten Tomatoes | Metacritic |
|---|---|---|
| The Lie | 44% (79 reviews) | 45/100 (13 reviews) |
| Black Box | 71% (68 reviews) | 62/100 (11 reviews) |
| Evil Eye | 44% (55 reviews) | 54/100 (9 reviews) |
| Nocturne | 62% (58 reviews) | 58/100 (11 reviews) |
| Bingo Hell | 65% (37 reviews) | 55/100 (8 reviews) |
| Black as Night | 69% (32 reviews) | 53/100 (7 reviews) |
| Madres | 71% (17 reviews) | 43/100 (5 reviews) |
| The Manor | 61% (28 reviews) | 59/100 (6 reviews) |
