= The Operative (film) =

2019 film directed by Yuval Adler

- Film poster
- Directed by: Yuval Adler
- Written by: Yuval Adler
- Based on: The English Teacher by Yiftach Reicher-Atir
- Produced by: Anne Carey; Jonathan Doweck; Viola Fügen; Michael Weber
- Starring: Diane Kruger; Martin Freeman; Cas Anvar
- Cinematography: Kolja Brandt
- Edited by: Hansjörg Weißbrich
- Music by: Frank Ilfman
- Production companies: Black Bear Pictures; Match Factory Productions; Spiro Films; Archer Gray Productions; Le Pacte; Mountain Trail Films
- Distributed by: Lev Cinemas (Israel); Le Pacte (France); Weltkino (Germany); Vertical Entertainment (United States)
- Release dates: February 10, 2019 (Berlinale); August 2, 2019 (United States)
- Running time: 120 minutes
- Countries: France; Germany; Israel; United States; Iran
- Languages: English; Hebrew; Persian
- Box office: $1.4 million

The Operative is a 2019 internationally co-produced (Note: including Israel, Germany, and the United States) thriller film, written and directed by Israeli filmmaker Yuval Adler, based on the Hebrew novel The English Teacher (המורה לאנגלית) by Yiftach Reicher-Atir, a former intelligence officer. It stars Diane Kruger, Martin Freeman and Cas Anvar.

It had its world premiere at the Berlin International Film Festival on February 10, 2019. It was released on August 2, 2019, by Vertical Entertainment.

== Plot ==
Thomas is a British Jew who until a year ago used to work for Israel's Mossad intelligence agency in Germany. Now he is retired but still has access to some of his former employer's systems and resources. He receives a mysterious phone call from Rachel, another former agent whom he had recruited and who had become a friend but disappeared. Summoned to a safe house in Cologne in order to help find Rachel and determine her motives, Thomas reviews Rachel's recruitment and past assignments with his former supervisors through a series of flashbacks.

Rachel's last known assignment was to pose as an English teacher in Tehran and observe Farhad Razavi, heir to an Iranian electronics firm. Flashback scenes reveal Rachel's acclimatisation to routines of daily life so as not to arouse suspicion. Eventually, she meets Farhad, who asks her to give him English lessons, leading to a romantic relationship as Farhad also introduces her to Tehran's underground nightlife.

Rachel's personal involvement with Farhad allows Thomas to involve him in the smuggling of parts for Iran's nuclear program, which will work to undermine that program and make Farhad a target for recruitment as a Mossad resource. Some of the related assignments put her own life in serious danger. Eventually, Rachel rebels against her assignment, changes her identity, and cuts off communication with Thomas until, returning to the film's present, she needs his help to return to a life of her own without risking assassination because she might be a security threat herself.

== Cast ==
- Diane Kruger as Rachel
- Martin Freeman as Thomas
- Cas Anvar as Farhad
- Liron Levo as Dan
- Yaakov Zada Daniel as Aran
- Ohad Knoller as Stephen

== Production ==
In February 2018, it was announced Diane Kruger and Eric Bana had joined the cast of the film, with Yuval Adler directing from a screenplay he wrote. Eitan Mansuri, Anne Carey, Michael Weber and Viola Fügen would serve as producers on the film under their Spiro Films, Archer Gray, Match Factory Productions banners, while Teddy Schwarzman would serve as an executive producer under his Black Bear Pictures banner. In May 2018, Cas Anvar and Martin Freeman joined the cast of the film, replacing Bana.

== Release ==
The film had its world premiere at the Berlin International Film Festival on February 10, 2019. Shortly after, Vertical Entertainment acquired distribution rights to the film. It was released on August 2, 2019.

== Reception ==
=== Box office ===
The Operative grossed a total worldwide of $1.4 million.

=== Critical response ===
Although many reviewers appreciated Diane Kruger's performance and a couple of especially suspenseful scenes, critics were also disappointed in Rachel's unclear motivations, a lack of chemistry between her and Farhad, and an overly-complex plot structure. Guy Lodge, reviewing the film at the Berlin Film Festival for Variety, remarks " . . . the general shape of the plotting is too recognizable to keep us entirely on edge, despite the stoic, furrowed-brow dedication of the cast", while The Hollywood Reporter complained that Kruger "needs more textured material than she's given in this choppy espionage thriller".

After the film's American release, Ben Kenigsberg, in The New York Times, described it as offering "a few suspenseful sequences, some interesting nuts-and-bolts details of espionage work and a good lead performance en route to an unsatisfying ending". Critic Christy Lemire gave the film two out of four, writing that "the overall sluggish pace and prevailing feeling of ambiguity ultimately make “The Operative” an unsatisfying, frustrating experience".

On review aggregator Rotten Tomatoes, the film holds an approval rating of 41%, based on 32 reviews, and an average rating of 5.1/10. The website's critics consensus reads, "Diane Kruger delivers an appropriately steely performance, but The Operative pursues a forgettable mission that fans of the genre will find all too familiar." On Metacritic, the film has a weighted average score of 47 out of 100, based on 10 critics.
