= Seducing Maarya =

- DVD cover
- Directed by: Hunt Hoe
- Written by: Hunt Hoe
- Produced by: Hunt Hoe
- Starring: Nandana Sen; Mohan Agashe; Cas Anvar; Vijay Mehta
- Cinematography: Michael Wees
- Edited by: Phyllis Lewis; Hunt Hoe
- Music by: Janet Lumb; Dino Giancola
- Release date: 21 June 2000
- Running time: 107 min
- Countries: India; Canada
- Language: English

Seducing Maarya is a 2000 Canadian English drama film directed by Hunt Hoe with Nandana Sen, Cas Anvar, Vijay Mehta, Ryan Hollyman and Mohan Agashe playing the lead roles.

The film was screened at the 31st International Film Festival of India and won the best director award at the Newport Beach International Film Festival in 2000.

== Plot ==
Vijay Chatterjee, a lonely widower is a successful restaurateur in Montreal. He hires Maarya, who recently emigrated from Calcutta, to work in his restaurant. Considering her to be an apt girl for her son Aashish, he gets her to marry him. Thoroughly Westernized Aashish, it turns out is a homosexual. But she plays along, keeping the secret from the elder Chatterjee, so that she can remain in the country. As he realizes the newly married couple are not behaving like one, he decides to teach his son the art of seducing a woman, oblivious to his orientation. He ends up falling in love with her himself. As she is eventually involved with her benefactor and now father-in-law, things get more complicated when Zakir, her jealous knife-wielding brother (and her lover in India), enters their lives and Maarya is found to be pregnant.

== Cast ==
- Nandana Sen as Maarya
- Mohan Agashe as Vijay Chatterjee
- Cas Anvar as Zakir
- Vijay Mehta as Ashish Chatterjee
- Ryan Hollyman as Michel
- Abhishekananda Singh Birla as Babu
- Cecile Cristobal as June Moon
- Hunt Hoe as Albert Woo
- Xavier Georges as Spike
- Todd Moxness as Skip - Band
- Kanika Kapoor
- Paraish Misra as Young Zakir
- Veena Sharma as Young Maarya
