= Ciera Payton =

American actress

Ciera Payton (born January 26, 1986) is an American actress, writer and singer. She has appeared in television series such as The Walking Dead, General Hospital, Graceland, and NCIS. She also had a supporting role as Sylvia in Tyler Perry's A Madea Family Funeral. She currently stars in the BET soap opera The Oval.

== Early life ==
Ciera Payton graduated from the New Orleans Center for Creative Arts and received her bachelor of fine arts degree in drama from the University of North Carolina School of the Arts.

== Career ==
Payton got her start in the feature film Flight of Fury (2007), playing the female lead role of CIA agent Jessica opposite Steven Seagal. She was a junior in college while filming Flight of Fury. In 2009, she made her off-Broadway debut, starring as the lead role of Savannah in Savannah Black and Blue, produced by the Negro Ensemble Company.

In 2010, Payton transitioned from New York to Los Angeles where she booked the role of Janet Tanner in the BBC American reboot of Torchwood. She later appeared on The Closer, playing opposite Keira Sedwick as Keisha Murphy. After gaining a few roles on the small screen, Payton was granted the role of Capri in Spike Lee's film Oldboy, sharing the screen with Josh Brolin.

In 2014, she appeared as the cheerleading coach who takes down a prominent campaign in The Runner starring Nicolas Cage.

In 2016, she received the Los Angeles Pioneer Woman Award for her work providing arts programs to at-risk youth.

In 2019, she starred in the film A Madea Family Funeral.

Payton portrayed talk show host Wendy Williams in the 2021 Lifetime biopic Wendy Williams: The Movie.

== Filmography ==
=== Film ===
| Year | Title | Role | Notes |
|---|---|---|---|
| 2007 | Flight of Fury | Jessica | Video |
| 2008 | Lords of the Street | Maria | |
| 2009 | Madea Goes to Jail | Undercover Detective | |
| 2009 | Midnight Bayou | Effie | TV movie |
| 2009 | The Way Home | Tasha | Short |
| 2010 | Moth to a Flame | Kara | Short |
| 2012 | A Woman's Worth Short Film | Melissa | Short |
| 2013 | The Other Door | Melissa | TV movie |
| 2013 | Paradise | Stripper #2 | |
| 2013 | Oldboy | Capri | |
| 2014 | Xxv (25) | Chris | Short |
| 2015 | American Bad Boy | Raven | |
| 2015 | The Runner | Lucy Hall | |
| 2015 | What's Bullying? | Teacher | TV Short |
| 2015 | Guiltless | Ciera | Short |
| 2016 | Forward | - | Short |
| 2016 | 59 Seconds | Foster Mom | |
| 2017 | Stain | Bernice | |
| 2018 | Dangerous Daze | Benita Bangs | Short |
| 2019 | A Madea Family Funeral | Sylvia | |
| 2019 | Afterthoughts | Det. Paige Aldridge | Short |
| 2020 | Sanctioned | April's Mom | Short |
| 2021 | Wendy Williams: The Movie | Wendy Williams | TV movie |
| 2021 | The Manor | Liesel | |
| 2022 | Respect the Jux | Karen | |
| 2023 | Love & Murder: Atlanta Playboy | Sophia | |

=== Television ===
| Year | Title | Role | Notes |
|---|---|---|---|
| 2008 | All My Children | Reporter | Episode: "1.9970" |
| 2010 | Fake It Til You Make It | MILF | Recurring cast |
| 2011 | The Closer | Keisha Murphy | Episode: "Unknown Trouble" |
| 2011 | Torchwood | Janet | Episode: "Miracle Day: The Middle Men" |
| 2012 | Californication | Hooker | Episode: "The Ride-Along" |
| 2012 | Body of Proof | Eve Johnson | Episode: "Going Viral, Part 2" |
| 2012 | The Mentalist | Angel | Episode: "Something Rotten in Redmund" |
| 2012 | Days of Our Lives | Martine Kent | Regular cast |
| 2012 | Common Law | Kelly | Episode: "Joint Custody" |
| 2013 | NCIS: Los Angeles | Ellen | Episode: "History" |
| 2013–14 | Graceland | Cassandra | Recurring cast: Season 1, Guest: Season 2 |
| 2014 | First | Nikki | Episode: "The First Awkward Moment" |
| 2014 | Bad Teacher | Meg the Bartender | Recurring cast |
| 2014 | It Could be Worse | Actress | Episode: "Too Much Candy" |
| 2015 | Reconcilable Differences | Eve | Recurring cast |
| 2015 | Real Husbands of Hollywood | Tracy | Episode: "Cabin Pressure" |
| 2016 | NCIS | Laurie Perkins | Episode: "Pay to Play" |
| 2017 | General Hospital | Grace McMorris | Episode: "1.13746" & "1.13820" |
| 2017 | Indoor Boys | Alyssa | Episode: "Mafia" |
| 2017 | Ballers | Lydia | Episode: "Alley-Oops" |
| 2017 | The Walking Dead | Zia | Episode: "The King, the Widow, and Rick" |
| 2019 | Being Mary Jane | Keia | Episode: "Becoming Pauletta" |
| 2019 | She's Gotta Have It | Jameelah Hawkins | Recurring cast: Season 2 |
| 2019–Present | Tyler Perry’s The Oval | Lily Winthrop | Main cast |
| 2023 | Princess Power | Queen Katia | Recurring cast |
