= Axelle Carolyn =

Belgian filmmaker, actress and journalist

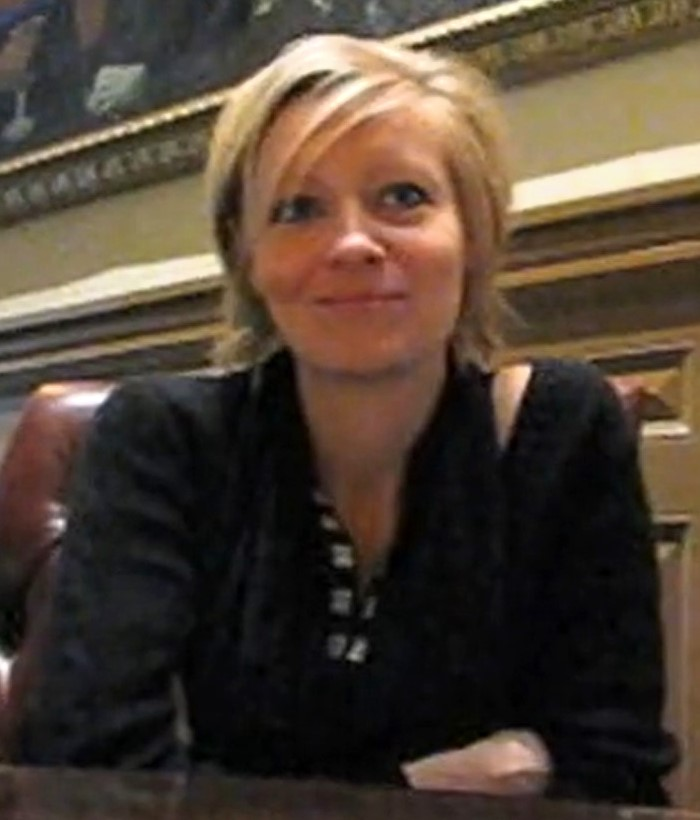
- Carolyn in 2010
- Born: 3 April 1979 (age 47); Brussels, Belgium
- Occupation: Filmmaker
- Spouse: Neil Marshall (m. 2007–2016)

Axelle Carolyn (born 3 April 1979) is a Belgian filmmaker and former actress and journalist.

== Career ==
=== Acting ===
Amongst many other jobs she worked on her way to directing her first films, Carolyn briefly worked in front of the camera. Her most notable appearance was as Pict warrior Aeron in Neil Marshall's Centurion.

=== Writing ===
A horror reporter for various magazines and websites from 2005 to 2008, Carolyn's non-fiction career culminated with the 2008 publication of It Lives Again! Horror Movies in the New Millennium, for which she won the Silver Award at the Book of the Year Awards; and 2018's FrightFest Guide to Ghost Movies, an analysis of the 200 most significant ghost stories ever made. She also had several short stories published in various anthologies, including Dark Delicacies III, and The Mammoth Book of Body Horror.

=== Directing ===
After writing and directing a handful of award-winning short films, Carolyn released her first feature, the ghost story Soulmate, in 2014. The movie premiered in Sitges in 2013, and went on to be screened at genre festivals around the world before its release. It was generally well received, though its mix of horror, drama and gothic romance divided opinions. In 2014, she created the anthology movie Tales of Halloween, which she co-produced with Epic Pictures. She also wrote and directed her own segment "Grim Grinning Ghost". In 2018, she worked in the writers room of Netflix's Chilling Adventures of Sabrina and co-wrote episode 9. In 2019, Carolyn directed episode 8 of Mike Flanagan's Netflix project The Haunting of Bly Manor entitled "The Romance of Certain Old Clothes." She also directed an episode of Creepshow for AMC. In 2021, she directed episodes of Flanagan's The Midnight Club, as well as two episodes of season 10 of American Horror Story. 2021 also saw the release of her second full feature as writer-director: The Manor, a horror mystery produced by Amazon Studios, Blumhouse and Sandy King, and starring Barbara Hershey.

== Personal life ==
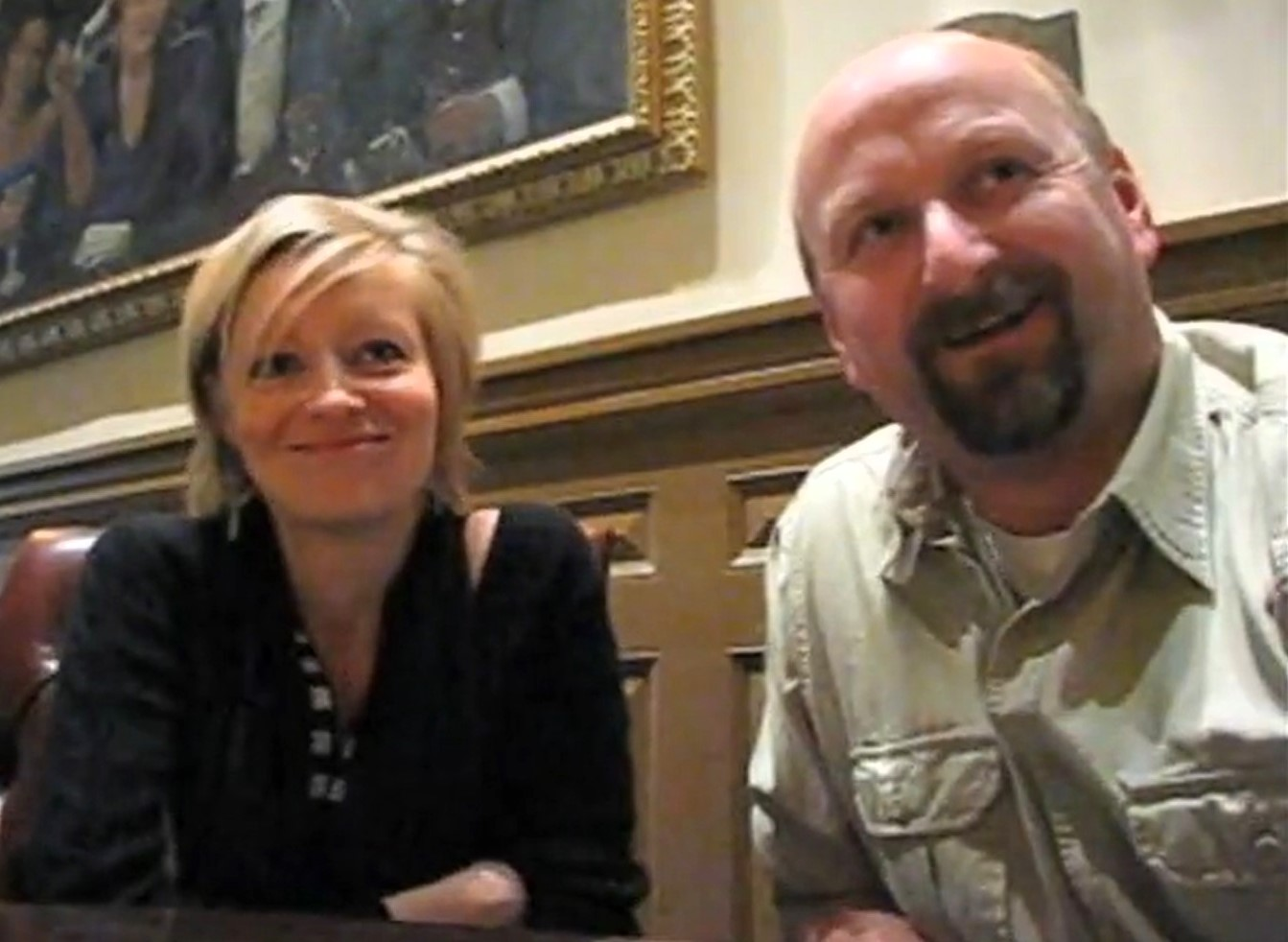
Carolyn with Neil Marshall in 2010

Axelle lives in Los Angeles with her dog (and frequent star) Anubis. She was married to British filmmaker Neil Marshall from 2007 to 2016.

== Filmography ==
=== Film ===
Year	Title	Director	Writer	Producer	Notes
2013	Soulmate	Yes	Yes	No	
2015	Tales of Halloween	Yes	Yes	Yes	Segment "Grim Grinning Ghost"
2021	The Manor	Yes	Yes	No	

Actress

- Beneath Still Waters (2005)
- Doomsday (2008)
- I Love You (2008)
- Horrorshow (2008)
- A Reckoning (2009)
- Blood + Roses (2009)
- Into the Dark: Exploring the Horror Film (2009)
- Psychosis (2009)
- Red Light (2009)
- Brides of Horror (2009)
- Centurion (2010)
- The 4th Reich (2015)

Other credits

- Beyond the Rave (2008) (Unit Publicist)
- Doomsday (2008) (Make-up artist)

=== Television ===
Writer

Year	Title	Notes
2018	Chilling Adventures of Sabrina	Episode "Chapter Nine: The Returned Man"

Director

Year	Title	Notes
2020	The Haunting of Bly Manor	Episode "The Romance of Certain Old Clothes"
2021	Creepshow	Episodes "Dead and Breakfast" and "Stranger Sings"
2021	American Horror Story: Double Feature	2 episodes
2023	Mayfair Witches	2 episodes
2024	Them	Episodes "The Man with the Red Hair" and "Happy Birthday, Sweet Boy"
2026	Something Very Bad Is Going to Happen	Episodes "I Will Light You on Fire" and "The Witness"
2026	Star Trek: Strange New Worlds	Episode "The Griffin Incident"
2026	Carrie	Episode "Dramatic Arts"
