= Black as Night =

2021 Horror film directed by Mariette Lee Go

- Official release poster
- Directed by: Maritte Lee Go
- Written by: Sherman Payne
- Produced by: John Brister; Terra Mair Abroms; Adan Orozco; Paul B. Uddo
- Starring: Asjha Cooper; Frabizio Guido; Mason Beauchamp; Abbie Gayle; Craig Tate; Keith David
- Cinematography: Cybel Martin
- Edited by: Tim Mirkovich
- Music by: Jacques Bridal Bar
- Production company: Blumhouse Television
- Distributed by: Amazon Studios
- Release date: October 1, 2021
- Running time: 87 minutes
- Country: United States
- Language: English

Black as Night is a 2021 American horror film directed by Maritte Lee Go and written by Sherman Payne. It stars Asjha Cooper, Frabizio Guido, Mason Beauchamp, Abbie Gayle, Craig Tate, and Keith David. The film is the sixth installment in the anthological Welcome to the Blumhouse film series.

== Plot ==
Set in post-Katrina New Orleans, the film follows 15-year-old Shawna, a teenager grappling with self-esteem issues, particularly concerning her dark skin. She lives with her father and brother, while her mother, Denise, struggles with drug addiction in the dilapidated Ombreaux housing project, a place still bearing the scars of Hurricane Katrina.

Shawna's summer takes a dark turn when she is attacked by a group of vampires while walking home from a party. Though bitten, she survives without turning, which leads her to discover that vampires are preying on the city's vulnerable homeless population. Her worst fears are confirmed when her mother becomes one of the undead, prompting Shawna to vow revenge.

Determined to stop the vampire menace, Shawna assembles a team comprising her best friend Pedro, her crush Chris, and the affluent yet eccentric Granya. Their investigation leads them to LeFrak, a notorious figure believed to be the vampire leader. However, they soon uncover that the true mastermind is Babineaux, a charismatic preacher who uses his position to recruit followers under the guise of social justice.

Babineaux's plan involves creating an army of vampires to reclaim power for the oppressed, but his methods are twisted and destructive. In their battle, Shawna confronts Babineaux in the mansion's secret tunnels. Utilizing her mother's silver locket, she manages to weaken and ultimately destroy him, turning him into ash.

The victory is bittersweet, as Pedro is bitten during the fight. Though presumed dead, the film's final scene reveals Pedro knocking on Shawna's door, hinting at his transformation into a vampire and leaving their story open-ended.

== Cast ==
- Asjha Cooper as Shawna
- Frabizio Guido as Pedro
- Mason Beauchamp as Chris
- Abbie Gayle as Granya
- Craig Tate as LeFrak
- Keith David as Babineaux

== Release ==
The film was released in the United States on October 1, 2021, by Amazon Studios.

== Reception ==
On review aggregator website Rotten Tomatoes, the film holds an approval rating of 70% based on 33 reviews, with an average rating of 6.20/10. The website's critical consensus reads: "It may not be particularly scary, but Black as Night has just enough bite to satisfy audiences in the mood for dark, teen-focused supernatural drama. On Metacritic, the film has an weighted average score of 53 out of 100 based on 7 critics indicating "mixed or average" reviews.

Denis Harvey of Variety gave the film a positive review and wrote:

It works well enough as a teen supernatural melodrama, reasonably slick if a tad silly - less well as straight-up horror, let alone as a commentary on race-centric historical and political issues that never feel more than pasted-on here.

Andrew Murray from The Upcoming gave the film 3 out of 5 rating and he wrote:

Black as Night is an enjoyably pulpy, but flawed genre outing. Its deployment of social commentary puts an engaging twist on a familiar premise, but a scatter-brained execution sours the taste.

=== Accolades ===
Award ceremony	Category	Recipient	Result	Ref.
NAACP Image Awards	Outstanding Supporting Actor in a Television Movie, Limited Series or Dramatic Special	Keith David	Nominated	
NAACP Image Awards	Outstanding Directing in a Television Movie or Special	Maritte Lee Go	Nominated	
NAACP Image Awards	Outstanding Writing in a Television Movie or Special	Sherman Payne	Nominated	
