= The Manor (film) =

2021 horror film

- Promotional release poster
- Directed by: Axelle Carolyn
- Written by: Axelle Carolyn
- Produced by: Richard J Bosner; Lisa Bruce; Jeremy Gold; Sandy King
- Starring: Barbara Hershey; Bruce Davison; Stacey Travis; Ciera Payton; Jill Larson; Mark Steger
- Cinematography: Andrés Sánchez
- Edited by: Kristina Hamilton-Grobler; Robert Hoffman
- Music by: Christopher Drake
- Production companies: Blumhouse Television; Storm King Productions
- Distributed by: Amazon Studios
- Release date: October 8, 2021
- Running time: 91 minutes
- Country: United States
- Language: English

The Manor is a 2021 American gothic supernatural horror film written and directed by Axelle Carolyn. The film stars Barbara Hershey, Bruce Davison, Stacey Travis, Ciera Payton, Jill Larson and Mark Steger.

The film was released in the United States on October 8, 2021 by Amazon Studios, as the eighth (and final) installment in the anthological Welcome to the Blumhouse film series.

== Plot ==
After suffering a stroke at her 70th birthday party, Judith Albright, a former professional dancer who is now a dance instructor, is moved into a nursing home after being diagnosed with Parkinson's disease. Her 17-year-old grandson, Josh, whom she is very close to, opposes the move, while his mother, Judith's daughter, Barbara, tries to comfort him. Judith assures Josh that the move is best for everyone. Soon, however, she notices strange behaviors and the deaths of other residents. She imagines a tree like figure looming in her room. Eventually, it is revealed that three of the other elderly people living there are much older than the others and have been using witchcraft to suck the life forces out of other patients. This allows them to become young every nightfall, returning to their old forms when the sun rises. Judith decides to join them so that she may live longer and spend more time with Josh, who comes to work at the Manor.

== Cast ==
- Barbara Hershey as Judith Albright
- Bruce Davison as Roland
- Nicholas Alexander as Josh Albright, Judith's grandson
- Jill Larson as Trish
- Fran Bennett as Ruth
- Katie A. Keane as Barbara Albright, Judith's daughter
- Ciera Payton as Liesel
- Nancy Linehan Charles as Annette
- Shelly Robertson as Elizabeth
- Stacey Travis as Ms. Benson
- Mark Steger as Minion
- Cissy Wellman as Imogen
- Andrew Tinpo Lee as Dr. Geoghegan

== Reception ==
On review aggregator website Rotten Tomatoes, the film holds an approval rating of 62% based on 29 reviews, with an average rating of 6/10. On Metacritic, the film holds a rating of 59 out of 100, based on 6 critics, indicating "mixed or average reviews".
