= Bingo Hell =

2021 horror film

- Promotional release poster
- Directed by: Gigi Saul Guerrero
- Screenplay by: Gigi Saul Guerrero; Shane McKenzie; Perry Blackshear
- Produced by: Jason Blum; Jeremy Gold; Marci Wiseman; Raynor Shima
- Starring: Adriana Barraza; L. Scott Caldwell; Joshua Caleb Johnson
- Cinematography: Byron Werner
- Edited by: Andrew Wesman
- Music by: Chase Horseman
- Production companies: Blumhouse Television; Luchagore Productions
- Distributed by: Amazon Studios
- Release dates: September 24, 2021 (Fantastic Fest); October 1, 2021
- Running time: 85 minutes
- Country: United States
- Language: English

Bingo Hell is a 2021 American comedy horror film directed by Gigi Saul Guerrero from a screenplay that she co-wrote with Shane McKenzie and Perry Blackshear. The film is the fifth installment in the anthological Welcome to the Blumhouse film series. The film stars Adriana Barraza, L. Scott Caldwell, and Joshua Caleb Johnson.

The film premiered at Fantastic Fest on September 24, 2021. The film was released in the United States on October 1, 2021, by Amazon Studios.

== Plot ==
A man named Mario comes home, having just sold his bingo hall. Seemingly in a daze, he dances around to the tune of classic Spanish music playing on vinyl. He begins speaking to himself, and then a picture of his dead wife Patricia about the sale. He says he can fulfill his promise of leaving "this place". He puts down a suitcase of money and begins to greedily eat a serving tray full of bingo balls. An ominous voice coaxes him on until he chokes to death.

An elderly woman named Lupita walks around Oak Springs one morning and meets up with her friend Clarence (who owns an auto repair shop). Lupita then goes to see her hairdresser, Yolanda, whose electricity is being fixed by Morris. Morris is not able to fix it because he says he doesn't have the right tools and leaves.

Cut to Dolores, who is mad at her daughter-in-law Raquel for not providing proper discipline for her grandson who has been breaking into cars and getting away with whatever he wants. She is also angry at the daughter-in-law for not doing her part and being irresponsible around the house after moving in when her husband died.

Dolores then goes to Yolanda's and meets up with Lupita who is already there. They have a discussion about Caleb, and Lupita brings up the similarities with Dolores's son, who has died and takes issue with it. After an awkward silence, Lupita apologizes and Dolores accepts begrudgingly before Lupita leaves. Lupita goes to a bingo game at the local bingo hall, but they finish up when they realize Mario has not paid his electricity bills.

The next day, Lupita and her friends find flyers around town saying that the bingo hall is under new management. Lupita, Morris, Clancy, Dolores, and Yolanda decide to take a look at it and realize that the bingo hall has been transformed into a casino. While there, Dolores spots Raquel, who wins ten thousand dollars from the owner, Mr. Big.

The next morning, Caleb and Dolores find that Raquel left them with her money. Raquel arrives at a motel, where she begins to rip off the straps of a dress. However, standing behind her is Mr. Big, who makes her hallucinate while in reality, she is using her fingernails to rip off her flesh. Lupita breaks into Mario's house and finds his corpse, before realizing that she hallucinated it.

They go back to the bingo hall, and this time Clarence wins one hundred thousand dollars. That night, Clarence parties by himself next to his car, drinking a bottle of beer, not realizing that he is actually drinking motor oil. He then sticks his arm into a car motor, violently shredding it and eventually killing him, not seeing the shadow of Mr. Big inside the car.

Lupita finds Clarence's body and sees Morris talking to Mr. Big, who gives him a stamp on his hand which begins to disintegrate. Lupita realizes the entire Oak Springs have been lured into the bingo hall, and heads there with Eric and her shotgun. Caleb tries to break in, blaming the place for his mom's disappearance, but Eric catches him and chases him inside. Mr. Big confronts him and then makes Eric stab himself in the neck with a poisoned syringe, before killing him by stomping on his skull.

Lupita tries to get the residents to leave, but Mr. Big begins to crush her head against a podium before Caleb shoots him in the back. Lupita destroys the TV and the residents attack Mr. Big, brutally beating him, until Lupita cracks open his head with the butt of her shotgun. Caleb sets fire to the money and they escape, leaving Mr. Big to burn.

== Cast ==
- Adriana Barraza as Lupita
- L. Scott Caldwell as Dolores
- Richard Brake as Mr. Big
- Joshua Caleb Johnson as Caleb
- Clayton Landey as Morris
- Jonathan Medina as Eric
- Bertila Damas as Yolanda
- Grover Coulson as Clarence
- Kelly Murtagh as Raquel
- David Jensen as Mario

== Production ==
Filming began on February 11, 2021, in New Orleans, Louisiana.

== Reception ==
On Rotten Tomatoes, the film holds an approval rating of 66% based on 38 reviews, with an average rating of 6.5/10. The site's consensus reads, "Although its card is far from full, Bingo Hell delivers moderately effective socially conscious horror while suggesting greater things for director Gigi Saul Guerrero". Metacritic assigned the film a weighted average score of 55 out of 100, based on 8 critics, indicating "mixed or average" reviews.
