= We Monsters =

2015 film

- Film poster
- Directed by: Sebastian Ko
- Written by: Sebastian Ko; Marcus Seibert
- Produced by: Roswitha Ester; Torsten Reglin
- Starring: Mehdi Nebbou
- Cinematography: Andreas Köhler
- Edited by: Nicole Kortlüke
- Music by: Dürbeck & Dohmen
- Release date: 22 January 2015
- Running time: 95 minutes
- Country: Germany
- Language: German

We Monsters (German: Wir Monster) is a 2015 German drama film directed by Sebastian Ko. It was screened in the Discovery section of the 2015 Toronto International Film Festival.

== Cast ==
- Mehdi Nebbou as Paul
- Ulrike C. Tscharre as Christine
- Janina Fautz as Sarah
- Ronald Kukulies as Kuszinsky

== Remake ==
A poorly-received English-language remake, The Lie, premiered at the 2018 Toronto International Film Festival.
