= 2015 Academy Awards =

2015 Academy Awards may refer to:

- 87th Academy Awards, the Academy Awards ceremony which took place in 2015
- 88th Academy Awards, the Academy Awards ceremony which took place in 2016 honoring the best in film for 2015
