= Black Box (2020 film) =

2020 film directed by Emmanuel Osei-Kuffour Jr.

- Official release poster
- Directed by: Emmanuel Osei-Kuffour Jr.
- Screenplay by: Emmanuel Osei-Kuffour Jr.; Stephen Herman
- Story by: Stephen Herman
- Produced by: John H. Brister
- Starring: Mamoudou Athie; Phylicia Rashad; Amanda Christine; Tosin Morohunfola; Charmaine Bingwa
- Cinematography: Hilda Mercado
- Edited by: Glenn Garland
- Music by: Brandon Roberts
- Production companies: Blumhouse Television; Black Bar Mitzvah
- Distributed by: Amazon Studios
- Release date: October 6, 2020
- Running time: 100 minutes
- Country: United States
- Language: English
- Budget: < $10 million

Black Box is a 2020 American science fiction horror film directed by Emmanuel Osei-Kuffour Jr. (in his directorial debut) and written by Osei-Kuffour Jr. and Stephen Herman. The film stars Mamoudou Athie, Phylicia Rashad, Amanda Christine, Tosin Morohunfola and Charmaine Bingwa. Jason Blum executive produced under his Blumhouse Television banner.

Black Box was released on October 6 by Amazon Studios on its OTT platform Amazon Prime Video as the second installment in the anthological theme-based film series Welcome to the Blumhouse.

== Plot ==
Nolan Wright survives a car crash physically intact but suffering from amnesia. Having lost his wife in the accident, he is now a single father to his 10-year-old daughter, Ava. Nolan has a hard time remembering his past and doing basic tasks, including cooking and picking up his daughter from school. Ava is very mature and highly precocious, and aids him in many of these tasks, even making excuses for him when he falls short in social settings. After receiving three warnings from Ava's teacher regarding his forgetful behavior (which she sees as neglect), and failing to get a photography contract at work, Nolan reconsiders his options.

After talking with his friend, Dr. Gary Yeboah, Nolan ultimately decides to opt for an experimental procedure that might help him get his memory back by enlisting the help of Dr. Brooks, a neurologist at the hospital he was first brought to after the accident. After using hypnosis, Dr. Brooks explores Nolan's mind and deems him a suitable subject for her "black box" treatment, saying that together they can try to regain his memory.

Unfortunately, this is not an easy process; Nolan sees figures, but not faces, and is frequently confronted by some sort of monster that causes him to panic and leave the memories. However, outside Dr. Brooks' office, he begins to catch glimpses of other memories, which help him work towards a more normal and healthy relationship with Ava.

None of this lasts long, though; as Dr. Brooks pushes Nolan further and further, he begins to suspect that there is a dark truth in his past, and although Dr. Yeboah assures him this is not the case, Nolan is frantic with worry. Eventually, in a session with Dr. Brooks, Nolan defeats the monster in his memories and looks into a mirror, only to realize he is not Nolan at all. When he comes to, he is aware of his true identity: Thomas Brooks, Dr. Brooks' own son.

Dr. Brooks reveals that Thomas died some time previously, but before he died she had mapped out his consciousness and uploaded it to the black box, so she could download his consciousness into the suitable host when one arrived. Thomas leaves, pretending to still be Nolan, but is struggling with this new knowledge. Eventually, he leaves Ava with Dr. Yeboah, as he says he no longer trusts himself. Thomas seeks out his wife, and tries to explain to her that he is back, but finds that she has erased all traces of him, and does not want him in her life.

At the same time, Dr. Yeboah is looking into Nolan's file and realizes there are some irregularities. He grows suspicious of Dr. Brooks. Ultimately, he and Ava break into Dr. Brooks' office, where they find her trying to replace what is left of Nolan's consciousness with Thomas's. They manage to interrupt her in time; Thomas and Nolan are physically acting out the fight for Nolan's mind in his consciousness, but Ava's screams remind Thomas of his own daughter's screams, and he gives up, realizing that he was killed by his wife, who threw him down the stairs after years of abuse.

It appears that Thomas has let go of his hold on Nolan as Nolan, Ava, and Dr. Yeboah are shown leaving, but Thomas's exact fate is left unknown. Dr. Brooks is then shown repairing the black box and trying to run Thomas' mapped consciousness, which seems to work, as she looks into the black box, says his name, and smiles.

== Cast ==
- Mamoudou Athie as Nolan Wright
- Phylicia Rashad as Dr. Lilian Brooks
- Amanda Christine as Ava Wright
- Tosin Morohunfola as Dr. Gary Yeboah
- Charmaine Bingwa as Miranda Brooks
- Donald Watkins as Thomas Brooks

== Production ==
In February 2020, it was announced Mamoudou Athie, Phylicia Rashad, Amanda Christine, Tosin Morohunfola and Troy James, had joined the cast of the film, with Jason Blum producing under his Blumhouse Television banner, with Amazon Studios distributing. The film is the first in an 8-part deal Blumhouse has with Amazon Studios. Principal photography took place in New Orleans, Louisiana.

== Release ==
It was released on October 6, 2020, alongside The Lie, as one of the first two films in the eight film anthology Welcome to the Blumhouse.

== Reception ==
=== Critical response ===
On Rotten Tomatoes, the film holds an approval rating of 70% based on 67 reviews and an average rating of 6.3/10. The site's critics consensus reads, "An intriguing debut for writer-director Emmanuel Osei-Kuffour, Black Box compensates for a lack of surprises with strong performances and an emotionally rewarding story." On Metacritic, the film has a weighted average score of 62 out of 100 based on 11 reviews, indicating "generally favorable" reviews.
