= The Lie (2018 film) =

2018 film directed by Veena Sud

- Official poster
- Directed by: Veena Sud
- Written by: Veena Sud
- Based on: We Monsters by: Marcus Seibert; Sebastian Ko
- Produced by: Jason Blum; Alix Madigan; Christopher Tricarico
- Starring: Mireille Enos; Peter Sarsgaard; Nicholas Lea; Joey King
- Cinematography: Peter Wunstorf
- Edited by: Phil Fowler
- Music by: Tamar-kali
- Production companies: Blumhouse Television; Mad Dog Films; Bitter Boy Productions
- Distributed by: Amazon Studios
- Release dates: September 13, 2018 (TIFF); October 6, 2020 (United States)
- Running time: 97 minutes
- Countries: Canada; United States
- Language: English
- Budget: <$10 million

The Lie is a 2018 psychological horror film written and directed by Veena Sud. The film is a remake of the 2015 German film We Monsters, and stars Mireille Enos, Peter Sarsgaard and Joey King. Jason Blum serves as a producer under his Blumhouse Television banner.

The Lie premiered at the Toronto International Film Festival on September 13, 2018. It was later released on October 6, 2020, by Amazon Studios, as the first installment in the anthological Welcome to the Blumhouse film series.

== Plot ==
Divorced father Jay drives his daughter Kayla to a ballet retreat. On the way, they find Kayla's friend, Britney, waiting on the side of the road, and give her a lift. After pulling over so Britney can go to the bathroom in the woods, Jay hears Kayla scream and finds her sitting alone on a bridge over a river. Kayla claims she pushed Britney off the bridge. Jay checks the area for Britney's body, but does not find it and assumes she drowned and was washed away. Kayla finds Britney's purse and they go to see Kayla's mother, Rebecca, an attorney.

At Rebecca's home, Kayla tells her that she murdered Britney. Britney's father, Sam, arrives in search of his daughter. When he asks to speak to Kayla, Rebecca lies, saying she is at the doctor. Later on, Sam gets suspicious and returns to discover that Rebecca lied and Kayla is at home. After a physical altercation with Jay, Sam threatens to go to the police. Noting that Britney had a bruise on her face, Jay convinces Rebecca to try and put suspicion on Sam for the disappearance. She contacts a police associate, Detective Kenji Tagata, to accuse Sam of abusing Britney. When Kenji interrogates Sam, he denies hitting Britney and admits that she has run away before. Kenji interviews Kayla, who says that Sam has a bad temper and hit Britney before.

Sam spots Kayla outside Jay's apartment and tries to grab her, but she retreats back into the house as he is chasing her, banging on the windows, and screaming her name. Jay and Rebecca try to bury Britney's phone behind Sam's house, but he catches them in the act. Before they flee, Sam tells them that he knows Kayla killed Britney. When Sam appears in front of their car, Rebecca purposefully drives into him. Jay and Rebecca consider calling for help before letting him bleed to death and leaving his corpse in the road.

The next morning, as Jay and Rebecca scrub Sam's blood off her car, Britney suddenly appears, alive and well, asking to speak to Kayla. Britney admits her disappearance was no more than an elaborate ruse between her and Kayla to allow for Britney to visit her boyfriend. Britney becomes uncomfortable and leaves after noticing a bloodied rag, and their suspicious reactions. Jay and Rebecca confront Kayla, who tearfully admits that she went along with Britney's plan, and escalated the lie by pretending to "push" Britney off the bridge, hoping that the pseudo-tragedy would bring her divorced parents back together. As the family embrace and Kayla begs her parents not to leave her, the doorbell rings and incoming police sirens are heard.

== Cast ==
- Mireille Enos as Rebecca Marston
- Peter Sarsgaard as Jay Logan
- Joey King as Kayla Logan
- Cas Anvar as Sam Ismali
- Devery Jacobs as Britney Ismali
- Nicholas Lea as Detective Rodney Barnes
- Patti Kim as Detective Kenji Tagata
- Alan van Sprang as Greg
- Rodrigo Fernandez-Stoll as Band Member

== Production ==
Principal photography on the film began in January 2018. Its working title was Between the Earth and the Sky. The film is set in New York and filmed in the Toronto area.

== Release ==
The film premiered at the Toronto International Film Festival on September 13, 2018. In August 2020, Amazon Studios acquired distribution rights to the film, and premiered it on October 6, 2020. Along with Black Box, it's one of the first two movies released from Blumhouse Productions's 8-film anthology Welcome to the Blumhouse.

== Reception ==
On review aggregator Rotten Tomatoes, the film holds an approval rating of 43% based on 77 reviews, with an average rating of 5.1/10. The website's critics consensus reads, "Queasily compelling without ever truly coming together, The Lie won't fool many viewers seeking worthwhile horror fare." On Metacritic, the film has a weighted average score of 45 out of 100, based on 13 critics, indicating "mixed or average reviews".

Kate Erbland of IndieWire wrote, "Too stupid to be the hard-hitting drama it was first sold as and too self-important to be the black comedy it really should be, Sud's film is a master class in bad decision-making, improbable choices, and overwrought acting." A.A. Dowd of The A.V. Club gave it a C− grade, calling the film "laughably ludicrous" and saying that it "seems to fancy itself a meditation on the extremes parents will go to on their children's behalf, but it's curiously disinterested in what should be its driving dramatic force: how Kayla's crime—and how little it seems to weigh on her conscience—might challenge their unconditional love for her." RogerEbert.com's Nick Allen gave it 1.5/4 stars, writing, "Very little about this movie works, in spite of a certain ambition in telling a story based solely on unfathomable decisions."

The Guardian's Phil Hoad gave it 4/5 stars, writing, "the couple are so blinkered in protecting their offspring that it prevents The Lie from entering more psychologically torn territory that might have made it profound. Instead it's merely car-crash compelling." Al Horner of Empire gave it 3/5 stars, calling it "A watchable tale of parental dread, propelled by a strong conceit and sustained tension - but let down by its outlandish twist."
