= List of Amazon Prime Video original films =

Amazon Prime Video is a global on-demand Internet streaming media provider, owned and operated by Amazon, that distributes a number of original programs that includes original series, specials, miniseries, documentaries, and films.

Many of the original contents in the list are not accessible in all countries where the service is available, or are localized only in some languages.

== Original films ==
=== Feature films ===
Title	Genre(s)	Premiere	Language
Brad's Status	Drama	September 15, 2017	English
Pass Over	Drama	April 20, 2018	English
Peterloo	Historical drama	April 5, 2019	English
Guava Island (Note: These shows were once available, but have been since removed from the service.)	Drama	April 13, 2019	English
Brittany Runs a Marathon	Comedy	November 22, 2019	English
The Report	Drama	November 29, 2019	English
The Aeronauts	Biopic	December 20, 2019	English
Troop Zero	Comedy drama	January 17, 2020	English
Blow the Man Down	Black comedy	March 20, 2020	English
Guns Akimbo	Action	March 23, 2020	English
Bloodshot	Action	March 27, 2020	English
Selah and the Spades	Drama	April 17, 2020	English
The Vast of Night	Science fiction	May 29, 2020	English
Ponmagal Vandhal	Legal drama	May 29, 2020	Tamil
Gulabo Sitabo	Comedy drama	June 12, 2020	Hindi
7500	Thriller	June 18, 2020	English
Penguin	Mystery thriller	June 19, 2020	Tamil
My Spy (Note: Available for rent or purchase only.)	Spy comedy	June 26, 2020	English
Fourth River	Drama	June 28, 2020	Malayalam
Sufiyum Sujatayum	Musical drama	July 3, 2020	Malayalam
Law	Legal drama	July 17, 2020	Kannada
Radioactive	Drama	July 24, 2020	English
French Biriyani	Comedy drama	July 24, 2020	Kannada
Shakuntala Devi	Biographical	July 31, 2020	Hindi
Chemical Hearts	Romantic drama	August 21, 2020	English
Get Duked!	Comedy	August 28, 2020	English
C U Soon	Mystery thriller	September 1, 2020	Malayalam
V	Action thriller	September 5, 2020	Telugu
Brutus vs César	Comedy	September 18, 2020	French
The Postcard Killings	Crime	September 25, 2020	English
Nishabdham / Silence	Mystery thriller	October 2, 2020	Tamil; Telugu
Black Box	Horror	October 6, 2020	English
The Lie	Horror	October 6, 2020	English
Nocturne	Horror	October 13, 2020	English
Evil Eye	Horror	October 13, 2020	English
Halal Love Story	Comedy drama	October 15, 2020	Malayalam
Putham Pudhu Kaalai	Drama	October 16, 2020	Tamil
Borat Subsequent Moviefilm	Comedy	October 23, 2020	English
Bheemasena Nalamaharaja	Drama romance	October 29, 2020	Kannada
Gatham	Thriller	November 6, 2020	Telugu
Soorarai Pottru	Drama	November 12, 2020	Tamil
Chhalaang	Comedy drama	November 13, 2020	Hindi
Mane Number 13	Horror	November 19, 2020	Kannada
Historias lamentables	Comedy drama	November 19, 2020	Spanish
Middle Class Melodies	Romance	November 20, 2020	Telugu
Force of Nature	Thriller	November 23, 2020	English
Uncle Frank	Drama	November 25, 2020	English
Bombhaat	Science fiction	December 3, 2020	Telugu
Sound of Metal	Drama	December 4, 2020	English
IIT Krishnamurthy	Mystery thriller	December 10, 2020	Telugu
I'm Your Woman	Neo-noir crime	December 11, 2020	English
Durgamati	Horror thriller	December 11, 2020	Hindi
Guvva Gorinka	Romance drama	December 17, 2020	Telugu
Unpaused	Anthology	December 18, 2020	Hindi
Sylvie's Love	Romantic drama	December 23, 2020	English
Coolie No. 1	Comedy drama	December 25, 2020	Hindi
Maara	Romance drama	January 8, 2021	Tamil
One Night in Miami...	Drama	January 15, 2021	English
Forte	Comedy	January 25, 2021	French
Bliss	Drama	February 5, 2021	English
The Map of Tiny Perfect Things	Romantic comedy	February 12, 2021	English
Drishyam 2	Thriller	February 19, 2021	Malayalam
Coming 2 America	Comedy	March 4, 2021	English
Our Friend	Drama	March 18, 2021	English
Picasso	Comedy	March 19, 2021	Marathi
Joji	Drama	April 7, 2021	Malayalam
Hello Charlie	Comedy	April 9, 2021	Hindi
Well Done Baby	Family drama	April 9, 2021	Marathi
Without Remorse	Action thriller	April 30, 2021	English
De Oost	War	May 13, 2021	Dutch
Ek Mini Katha	Comedy	May 27, 2021	Telugu
Pachchis	Thriller	June 12, 2021	Telugu
Sherni	Thriller	June 18, 2021	Hindi
Cold Case	Thriller	June 30, 2021	Malayalam
The Tomorrow War	Science fiction action	July 2, 2021	English
Sara's	Romance drama	July 5, 2021	Malayalam
Malik	Political crime drama	July 15, 2021	Malayalam
Toofaan	Sports drama	July 16, 2021	Hindi
Narappa	Action drama	July 20, 2021	Telugu
Ikkat	Comedy	July 21, 2021	Kannada
Sarpatta Parambarai	Sports drama	July 22, 2021	Tamil
Jolt	Action comedy	July 23, 2021	English
Kuruthi	Action thriller	August 11, 2021	Malayalam
Shershaah	Biographical	August 12, 2021	Hindi
Home	Action thriller	August 19, 2021	Malayalam
Cinderella	Musical	September 3, 2021	English
The Voyeurs	Erotic thriller	September 10, 2021	English
Tuck Jagadish	Action drama	September 10, 2021	Telugu
Everybody's Talking About Jamie	Musical comedy-drama	September 17, 2021	English
The Mad Women's Ball	Period mystery thriller	September 17, 2021	French
Sunny	Musical drama	September 23, 2021	Malayalam
Birds of Paradise	Drama	September 24, 2021	English
Raame Aandalum Raavane Aandalum	Drama	September 24, 2021	Tamil
Bingo Hell	Horror	October 1, 2021	English
Black as Night	Horror	October 1, 2021	English
Bhramam	Crime thriller	October 7, 2021	Malayalam
Madres	Horror	October 8, 2021	English
The Manor	Horror	October 8, 2021	English
Udanpirappe	Family drama	October 14, 2021	Tamil
Sardar Udham	Biographical	October 16, 2021	Hindi
Rathnan Prapancha	Comedy drama	October 22, 2021	Kannada
Dog Years	Comedy	October 22, 2021	Italian
Dybbuk	Supernatural horror	October 29, 2021	Hindi
Jai Bhim	Legal drama	November 2, 2021	Tamil
Jivan Sandhya	Romantic drama	November 9, 2021	Marathi
Flashback	Science fiction comedy	November 11, 2021	French
The Green Knight	Medieval comedy	November 17, 2021	English
Dhummas	Thriller drama	November 23, 2021	Gujarati
Drushyam 2	Thriller drama	November 25, 2021	Telugu
Chhorii	Horror	November 26, 2021	Hindi
Bali	Horror	December 9, 2021	Marathi
Encounter	Science fiction thriller	December 10, 2021	English
Being the Ricardos	Biographical drama	December 21, 2021	English
The Tender Bar	Coming-of-age	January 7, 2022	English
Hotel Transylvania: Transformania	Animation	January 14, 2022	English
One Cut Two Cut	Comedy	February 3, 2022	Kannada
Book of Love	Romantic comedy	February 4, 2022	English
Mahaan	Action drama	February 10, 2022	Tamil
Gehraiyaan	Romantic drama	February 11, 2022	Hindi
Homestay	Romantic drama Fantasy	February 11, 2022	Japanese
I Want You Back	Romantic comedy	February 11, 2022	English
Family Pack	Comedy	February 17, 2022	Kannada
One Night Off	Comedy	February 21, 2022	German
Master	Horror	March 18, 2022	English
Jalsa	Drama	March 18, 2022	Hindi
S.O.S. Mamis: La película	Comedy	March 18, 2022	Spanish
Achcham Madam Naanam Payirppu	Drama	March 25, 2022	Tamil
Sharmaji Namkeen	Comedy drama	March 31, 2022	Hindi
All the Old Knives	Spy thriller	April 8, 2022	English
Oh My Dog	Comedy drama	April 21, 2022	Tamil
I Love America	Comedy	April 29, 2022	French
Saani Kaayidham	Crime drama	May 6, 2022	Tamil
Emergency	Comedy-drama thriller	May 20, 2022	English
The Contractor	Thriller	June 15, 2022	English
My Fake Boyfriend	Romantic comedy	June 27, 2022	English
Don't Make Me Go	Comedy drama	July 15, 2022	English
1Up (Note: Available to rent or buy only on the Lionsgate+ channel.)	Comedy	July 15, 2022	English
Anything's Possible	Coming-of-age romantic comedy	July 22, 2022	English
Thirteen Lives	Biographical survival	August 5, 2022	English
Doblemente embarazada 2	Comedy	August 5, 2022	Spanish
Samaritan	Superhero drama	August 26, 2022	English
48 Jam untuk Indah	Family drama	September 15, 2022	Indonesian
Goodnight Mommy	Horror	September 16, 2022	English
My Best Friend's Exorcism	Comedy horror	September 30, 2022	English
Maja Ma	Drama	October 6, 2022	Hindi
Catherine Called Birdy	Medieval comedy	October 7, 2022	English
Ammu	Thriller drama	October 19, 2022	Telugu
Perfect Strangers	Comedy drama	October 20, 2022	Indonesian
Argentina, 1985	Historical drama	October 21, 2022	Spanish
Run Sweetheart Run	Horror	October 28, 2022	English
Classico	Comedy	October 28, 2022	French
Before I Met You	Romantic drama	November 3, 2022	Indonesian
My Policeman	Romantic drama	November 4, 2022	English
Overdose	Action thriller	November 4, 2022	French
Autumn Beat	Drama	November 10, 2022	Italian
La caída	Drama	November 11, 2022	Spanish
The People We Hate at the Wedding	Comedy	November 18, 2022	English
Sachertorte	Comedy	November 18, 2022	German
Your Christmas or Mine?	Romantic comedy	December 2, 2022	English
Tomorrow Is Today	Comedy adventure	December 2, 2022	Spanish
Hawa	Drama	December 9, 2022	French
Something from Tiffany's	Romantic comedy	December 9, 2022	English
Nanny	Horror thriller	December 16, 2022	English
Off-Lined	Comedy	December 17, 2022	Spanish
Gospel	Comedy	December 24, 2022	Spanish
Scandal Makers	Comedy drama	January 19, 2023	Indonesian
Shotgun Wedding	Romantic comedy action	January 27, 2023 (Note: United States)	English
In Your Dreams	Romantic comedy	February 3, 2023	Turkish
Casando a mi Ex	Romantic comedy	February 6, 2023	Spanish
Somebody I Used to Know	Romantic comedy	February 10, 2023	English
Ten Little Mistresses	Mystery comedy	February 15, 2023	Filipino
Innocent Vengeance	Thriller	February 16, 2023	Indonesian
Die Hart	comedy	February 24, 2023	English
Sayen	Action thriller	March 3, 2023	Spanish
Tangos, tequilas y algunas mentiras	Romance	March 10, 2023	Spanish
Walang KaParis (Nothing Like Paris)	Romantic drama	March 23, 2023	Filipino
Perfect Addiction	Romantic drama	March 23, 2023	English
On a Wing and a Prayer	Biographical survival	April 7, 2023	English
Gangs of Lagos	Crime film	April 7, 2023	English
The Seed	Comedy	May 3, 2023	French
Beautiful Disaster	Romantic comedy	May 5, 2023	English
Mother's Day Is Cancelled	Comedy	May 5, 2023	Spanish
Air	Biopic	May 12, 2023	English
Ang Mga Kaibigan ni Mama Susan	Horror	May 18, 2023	Filipino
Medellin	Action	June 2, 2023	French
Um Ano Inesquecível - Verão	Romance	June 2, 2023	Portuguese
My Fault	Erotic drama Romance	June 8, 2023	Spanish
Um Ano Inesquecível - Outono	Romance	June 9, 2023	Portuguese
Um Ano Inesquecível - Inverno	Romance	June 16, 2023	Portuguese
200 Pounds Beauty	Romantic comedy	June 22, 2023	Indonesian
Um Ano Inesquecível - Primavera	Romance	June 23, 2023	Portuguese
Tiku Weds Sheru	Romantic drama	June 23, 2023	Hindi
Why Do You Love Me	Road comedy drama	June 28, 2023	Indonesian
The Hottest Summer	Romantic drama	July 6, 2023	Italian
The Initiated	Crime film	July 7, 2023	Spanish
Robots	Comedy	July 17, 2023	English
Bawaal	Romantic drama	July 21, 2023	Hindi
Guy Ritchie's The Covenant	Action	July 27, 2023	English
S.O.S. Mamis 2: Mosquita muerta	Comedy	August 2, 2023	Spanish
Divina señal	Comedy	August 4, 2023	Spanish
Red, White & Royal Blue	Romantic comedy	August 11, 2023	English
Sitting in Bars with Cake	Comedy drama	September 8, 2023	English
Sentinelle	Action comedy	September 8, 2023	French
A Million Miles Away	Drama	September 15, 2023	English
Invalidite	Drama	September 21, 2023	Indonesian
Cassandro	Biographical drama	September 22, 2023	English
Totally Killer	Horror comedy	October 6, 2023	English
Awareness	Science-fiction	October 11, 2023	Spanish
In My Mother's Skin	Folk horror	October 12, 2023	Filipino
The Burial	Drama	October 13, 2023	English
Daisuke Jigen	Action	October 13, 2023	Japanese
Sayen: Desert Road	Action thriller	October 20, 2023	Spanish
The Day of the Dead Is Cancelled	Comedy	October 27, 2023	Spanish
Knuckle Girl	Action	November 2, 2023	Japanese
Pippa	War	November 10, 2023	Hindi
Bihter	Romantic drama	November 16, 2023	Turkish
Congrats My Ex!	Romantic comedy	November 16, 2023	Thai
Elf Me	Christmas adventure comedy	November 24, 2023	Italian
Candy Cane Lane	Christmas fantasy comedy	December 1, 2023	English
Your Christmas or Mine 2	Christmas romantic comedy	December 8, 2023	English
Dating Santa	Christmas romantic comedy	December 8, 2023	Spanish
Merry Little Batman	Animated Christmas action comedy	December 8, 2023	English
Mast Mein Rehne Ka	Comedy	December 8, 2023	Hindi
O Primeiro Natal do Mundo	Christmas comedy	December 8, 2023	Portugues
Silver and the Book of Dreams	Fantasy drama	December 8, 2023	English
Breath of Life	Drama	December 15, 2023	English
Dry Day	Comedy	December 22, 2023	Hindi
How to Succeed at Losing	Sports comedy	December 22, 2023	Spanish
Saltburn	Black comedy psychological thriller	December 22, 2023	English
Foe	Science fiction psychological thriller	January 5, 2024	English
Landscape with Invisible Hand	Science fiction	January 9, 2024	English
Role Play	Action comedy thriller	January 12, 2024	English
The Underdoggs	Sports comedy	January 26, 2024	English
Trunk – Locked in	Thriller	January 26, 2024	German
Upgraded	Romantic comedy	February 9, 2024	English
Still Fabulous	Romantic comedy	February 12, 2024	Italian
Five Blind Dates	Romantic comedy	February 13, 2024	English
Fazendo Meu Filme	Teen romantic comedy	February 14, 2024	Portuguese
This Is Me... Now: A Love Story	Romantic musical	February 16, 2024	English
Ricky Stanicky	Comedy	March 7, 2024	English
Sirens	Action comedy	March 15, 2024	French
Ae Watan Mere Watan	Biographical	March 21, 2024	Hindi
Road House	Action comedy	March 21, 2024	English
Un hipster en la España vacía	Comedy	March 27, 2024	Spanish
The Boys in the Boat	Biographical sports drama	March 29, 2024	English
Música	Romantic comedy	April 4, 2024	English
How to Date Billy Walsh	Teen romantic comedy	April 5, 2024	English
Gli addestratori	Comedy	April 25, 2024	Italian
Sayen: The Huntress	Action thriller	April 26, 2024	Spanish
The Idea of You	Romantic comedy	May 2, 2024	English
Water & Garri	Drama	May 10, 2024	English
Beautiful Wedding	Romantic comedy	May 17, 2024	English
Arthur the King	Drama	May 24, 2024	English
Die Hart 2: Die Harter	comedy	May 30, 2024	English
Les infaillibles	Action	Jun 20, 2024	French
Sharmajee Ki Beti	Comedy	June 28, 2024	Hindi
Space Cadet	Comedy	July 4, 2024	English
Maybe It's True What They Say About Us	Thriller	July 7, 2024	Spanish
Divorce in the Black	Thriller	July 11, 2024	English
My Spy: The Eternal City	Thriller	July 18, 2024	English
One Fast Move	Action	August 8, 2024	English
The Shakedown	Comedy	August 8, 2024	English
Jackpot!	Action comedy	August 15, 2024	English
Killer Heat	Action	September 26, 2024	English
The Initiated: Written from the Shadows	Drama	September 27, 2024	Spanish
House of Spoils	Horror	October 3, 2024	English
El diario	Thriller	October 4, 2024	Spanish
Brothers	Action comedy	October 17, 2024	English
The Park Maniac	True crime drama	October 18, 2024	Portuguese
Blue Cave	Romantic comedy	October 18, 2024	Turkish
Canary Black	Action	October 24, 2024	English
Nokturno	Folk horror	October 31, 2024	Filipino
Apocalypse Z: The Beginning of the End	Science fiction	October 31, 2024	Spanish
Libre	Romantic comedy	November 1, 2024	French
Pimpinero: Blood and Oil	Comedy	November 22, 2024	Spanish
Hunting with Tigers	Action	November 22, 2024	French
Christmas Is Cancelled	Comedy	November 29, 2024	Spanish
The Red Virgin	Drama	December 5, 2024	Spanish
Love in 39 Degrees	Romantic comedy	December 6, 2024	Turkish
Agni	Action thriller	December 6, 2024	Hindi
3 Working Days	Drama	December 11, 2024	English
A Night in 2005	Drama	December 18, 2024	English
Christmas in Lagos	Romance	December 20, 2024	English
Your Fault	Romantic drama	December 27, 2024	Spanish
The Gardener	Action	January 10, 2025	French
Unstoppable	Biographical sports drama	January 16, 2025	English
The Calendar Killer	Thriller	January 16, 2025	German
Undercover Party Crasher	Action comedy	January 17, 2025	Portuguese
You're Cordially Invited	Romantic comedy	January 30, 2025	English
The Mehta Boys	Drama	February 7, 2025	Hindi
My Fault: London	Romantic drama	February 13, 2025	English
Broken Rage	Thriller	February 13, 2025	Japanese
Picture This	Romantic comedy	March 6, 2025	English
Be Happy	Drama	March 14, 2025	Hindi
Duplicity	Drama	March 20, 2025	English
Holland	Thriller	March 27, 2025	English
Desconectados 2: Reconectados	Comedy	March 28, 2025	Spanish
Carjackers	Action	March 28, 2025	French
G20	Action	April 10, 2025	English
Chhorii 2	Horror	April 11, 2025	Hindi
1992	Thriller	April 12, 2025	English
Another Simple Favor	Black comedy	May 1, 2025	English
Tin Soldier	Action thriller	May 8, 2025	English
Graduation Trip: Mallorca	Comedy	May 30, 2025	Spanish
Un mariage sans fin	Comedy	May 30, 2025	French
Stolen	Action thriller	June 4, 2025	Hindi
Paris in Bali	Romantic drama	June 6, 2025	Indonesian
Deep Cover	Action comedy	June 12, 2025	English
Heads of State	Action comedy	July 2, 2025	English
Uppu Kappurambu	Comedy drama	July 4, 2025	Telugu
Sniper: The Last Stand (Note: Available for rent or purchase only.)	Action thriller	July 7, 2025	English
The Lost Days	Drama	July 11, 2025	English
Follow	Thriller	July 18, 2025	Spanish
War of the Worlds	Science fiction action-thriller	July 30, 2025	English
The Pickup	Comedy	August 6, 2025	English
The Siege at Thorn High	Action thriller	August 15, 2025	Indonesian
The Map That Leads to You	Drama	August 20, 2025	English
Say Who Die	Drama action crime	August 29, 2025	English
Songs of Paradise	Biopic	August 29, 2025	Hindi
Enemies	Drama	August 29, 2025	Spanish
McWalter	Comedy action	September 12, 2025	French
Play Dirty	Crime	October 1, 2025	English
Maintenance Required	Comedy	October 8, 2025	English
Our Fault	Romantic drama	October 16, 2025	Spanish
Host	Horror	October 23, 2025	Thai
Hedda	Drama	October 29, 2025	English
Finding Joy	Drama	November 5, 2025	English
Playdate	Action comedy	November 12, 2025	English
Nishaanchi Part 2	Crime	November 14, 2025	Hindi
31 Minutes: One Hot Christmas	Animated Christmas comedy	November 21, 2025	Spanish
Two Worlds, One Wish	Romantic drama	November 25, 2025	Turkey
Mrs. Christmas	Comedy	November 28, 2025	Italian
Perrengue Fashions	Comedy	November 28, 2025	Portuguese
Oh. What. Fun.	Christmas comedy	December 3, 2025	English
Merv	Christmas Romantic drama comedy	December 10, 2025	English
Tell Me Softly	Romantic drama	December 12, 2025	Spanish
Trap House	Action thriller	December 31, 2025	English
Follow My Voice	Romantic drama	January 2, 2026	Spanish
The Tiger	War	January 2, 2026	German
Cheekatilo	Crime thriller	January 23, 2026	Telugu
The Wrecking Crew	Action comedy	January 28, 2026	English
Relationship Goals	Romantic comedy	February 4, 2026	English
Fabian and the Deadly Wedding	Crime comedy	February 6, 2026	German
Love Me Love Me	Romantic drama	February 13, 2026	English
The Bluff	Swashbuckler Action thriller	February 25, 2026	English
Subedaar	Action drama	March 5, 2026	Hindi
Zeta	Action thriller	March 20, 2026	Spanish
Pretty Lethal	Action thriller	March 25, 2026	English
Balls Up	Comedy	April 15, 2026	English
Vengeance	Action thriller	April 22, 2026	Spanish
No Place to Be Single	Romantic comedy	May 8, 2026	Italian
Jack Ryan: Ghost War	Action thriller	May 20, 2026	English
System	Drama	May 22, 2026	Hindi
Summer House	Romantic fantasy	June 6, 2026	Turkish
A Family of Bastards	Comedy	June 12, 2026	French
Still Sexy	Comedy	June 12, 2026	Italian
Your Fault: London	Romantic drama	June 17, 2026	English
Driver's Ed	Comedy	June 26, 2026	English
The Devil's Mouth	Survival horror	July 29, 2026	English
Beast Race	Science fiction Action thriller	August 7, 2026	Portuguese
Mystery Arena	Mystery	August 14, 2026	Japanese
Back to the 90s	Comedy	August 21, 2026	German
The Last Sunrise	Romantic drama	August 26, 2026	English
Babita Singh Reporting	Drama	August 28, 2026	Hindi
Barreda	Drama	August 28, 2026	Spanish
The Runner	Action thriller	September 2, 2026	English
Drawn Together	Romantic drama	September 9, 2026	Spanish
Sultana	Drama	September 17, 2026	Turkish
You+Me – Against the World	Romantic drama	September 18, 2026	French
The Love Hypothesis	Romantic drama	September 23, 2026	English
Don't Be Shy	Romantic comedy	September 25, 2026	Hindi
Love of Your Life	Romantic drama	October 14, 2026	English
Masterplan	Comedy thriller	October 16, 2026	English
Drive – The Pretenders	Sports romantic drama	October 28, 2026	German
Apocalypse Z: New World	Science fiction	October 30, 2026	Spanish
Madden	Biographical sports drama	November 18, 2026	English
Last Meal	romantic drama	November 19, 2026	Turkish
Perfect Liars	Teen drama thriller	November 20, 2026	Spanish
Awaiting release
Clashing Through the Snow	Christmas Comedy	November 25, 2026	English
The Man with the Bag	Christmas action comedy	December 2, 2026	English
Storm	Drama	January 15, 2027	French

=== Documentaries ===
Title	Premiere	Language
Jonas Brothers: Chasing Happiness	June 4, 2019	English
Halston	June 7, 2019	English
Andy Murray: Resurfacing	November 29, 2019	English
Alejandro Sanz: #Lagira de #eldisco	December 5, 2019	Spanish
Happiness Continues: A Jonas Brothers Concert Film	April 24, 2020	English
Amaia: Una vuelta al sol	May 1, 2020	Spanish
All In: The Fight for Democracy	September 18, 2020	English
Kiss the Ground	September 22, 2020	English
Ferro	November 6, 2020	Italian
Bastille: ReOrchestrated	February 10, 2021	English
The Boy from Medellín	May 7, 2021	Spanish
Pink: All I Know So Far	May 21, 2021	English
Mary J. Blige's My Life	June 25, 2021	English
Val	August 6, 2021	English
The Tiger Mafia	August 14, 2021	English
My Name Is Pauli Murray	October 1, 2021	English
Justin Bieber: Our World	October 8, 2021	English
A Man Named Scott	November 5, 2021	English
Mayor Pete	November 12, 2021	English
Burning	November 25, 2021	English
Lucy and Desi	March 4, 2022	English
Elizabeth Windsor	June 1, 2022	English
Kick Like Tayla	June 16, 2022	English
Warriors on the Field	July 7, 2022	English
Beast Mode On	October 26, 2022	English
Good Night Oppy	November 23, 2022	English
Wildcat	December 30, 2022	English
KSI: In Real Life	January 26, 2023	English
Reggie	March 24, 2023	English
Judy Blume Forever	April 21, 2023	English
Destination NBA: A G League Odyssey	August 8, 2023	English
Mr. Dressup: The Magic of Make-Believe	October 10, 2023	English
Silver Dollar Road	October 13, 2023	English
Hot Potato: The Story of the Wiggles	October 23, 2023	English
Maxine's Baby: The Tyler Perry Story	November 17, 2023	English
Victoria's Secret: The Tour '23	December 1, 2023	English
The Greatest Love Story Never Told	February 27, 2024	English
Frida	March 14, 2024	Spanish
For Love & Life: No Ordinary Campaign	May 28, 2024	English
Federer: Twelve Final Days	June 20, 2024	English
I Am: Celine Dion	June 25, 2024	English
Cirque Du Soleil: Without a Net	July 25, 2024	English
Megan Thee Stallion: In Her Words	October 31, 2024	English
ChiefsAholic: A Wolf in Chiefs Clothing	December 24, 2024	English
This Is the Tom Green Documentary	January 24, 2025	English
Man on the Run	February 27, 2026	English
Meal Ticket	March 19, 2026	English
Kyle Larson vs. the Double	May 21, 2026	English
Go Deep: The DeSean Jackson Story	September 24, 2026	English
Terrell & T.O.	November 5, 2026	English

=== Specials ===
Title	Premiere	Language
Savage X Fenty Show	September 20, 2019	English
The Kacey Musgraves Christmas Show	November 29, 2019	English
Savage X Fenty Show Vol. 2	October 2, 2020	English
What the Constitution Means to Me	October 16, 2020	English
Yearly Departed 2020	December 29, 2020	English
Savage X Fenty Show Vol. 3	September 24, 2021	English
Yearly Departed 2021	December 23, 2021	English
The Weeknd X Dawn FM Experience	February 26, 2022	English
Savage X Fenty Show Vol. 4	November 9, 2022	English
Kendrick Lamar Live: The Big Steppers Tour	November 23, 2022	English
Hip Hop World	April 16, 2024	English

=== Stand-up comedy specials ===
Title	Premiere	Language
Kenny Sebastian: Don't Be That Guy	May 1, 2017	English
Biswa Kalyan Rath: Biswa Mast Aadmi	May 19, 2017	Hindi
Kanan Gill: Keep It Real	May 26, 2017	English
Zakir Khan: Haq Se Single	July 9, 2017	Hindi
Nishant Tanwar aka Joke Singh: Delhi Se Hoon B*@!&#%d	April 6, 2018	Hindi
Vaibhav Sethia: Don't	May 25, 2018	English
Zakir Khan: Kaksha Gyarvi	November 23, 2018	Hindi
Kanan Gill & Kenny Sebastian: Sketchy Behaviour	February 14, 2019	English
Jim Gaffigan: Quality Time	August 16, 2019	English
Flo & Joan: Alive on Stage	August 19, 2019	English
Ed Gamble: Blood Sugar	August 19, 2019	English
Paul Chowdhry: Live Init	August 19, 2019	English
Chris Ramsey: Approval Needed	August 19, 2019	English
Alice Wetterlund: My Mama Is a Human and So Am I	August 23, 2019	English
Alonzo Bodden: Heavy Lightweight	August 23, 2019	English
#IMomSoHard Live	August 23, 2019	English
Mike E. Winfield: StepMan	August 23, 2019	English
Biswa Kalyan Rath: Sushi	October 25, 2019	English
Ilana Glazer: The Planet Is Burning	January 3, 2020	English
Jayde Adams: Serious Black Jumper	January 3, 2020	English
Rob Delaney: Jackie	January 17, 2020	English
Russell Peters: Deported	January 17, 2020	English
Celia Pacquola: All Talk	April 10, 2020	English
Zoë Coombs Marr: Bossy Bottom	April 10, 2020	English
Alice Fraser: Savage	April 17, 2020	English
Tommy Little: Self-Diagnosed Genius	April 17, 2020	English
Dilruk Jayasinha: Live	April 24, 2020	English
Judith Lucy: Judith Lucy vs Men	April 24, 2020	English
Lano & Woodley: Fly	May 1, 2020	English
Tom Walker: Very Very	May 1, 2020	English
Tom Gleeson: Joy	May 8, 2020	English
Anne Edmonds: What's Wrong with You?	May 8, 2020	English
Jimmy O. Yang: Good Deal	May 8, 2020	English
Gina Brillon: The Floor Is Lava	June 5, 2020	English
Jim Gaffigan: The Pale Tourist	July 24, 2020	English
Iain Stirling: Failing Upwards	May 27, 2022	English
Nate Bargatze: Hello World	January 31, 2023	English
Kathleen Madigan: Hunting Bigfoot	February 21, 2023	English
Lizzy Hoo: Hoo Cares!?	April 6, 2023	English
Alex Borstein: Corsets & Clown Suits	April 18, 2023	English
Jimmy O. Yang: Guess How Much?	May 2, 2023	English
2 Moms, 1 Mic	May 14, 2023	English
Zarna Garg: One in a Billion	May 16, 2023	English
Jim Gaffigan: Dark Pale	July 25, 2023	English
Zainab Johnson: Hijabs Off	October 24, 2023	English
Dina Hashem: Dark Little Whispers	November 10, 2023	English
Trevor Wallace: Pterodactyl	November 14, 2023	English
Jenny Slate: Seasoned Professional	February 23, 2024	English
Tig Notaro: Hello Again	March 26, 2024	English
Marlon Wayans: Good Grief	June 4, 2024	English
Sam Morril: You've Changed	July 9, 2024	English
Jeff Dunham's Scrooged-Up Holiday Special	November 19, 2024	English
The World According to Kaleb on Tour	November 29, 2024	English
Tom Green: I Got a Mule!	January 28, 2025	English
Kathleen Madigan: The Family Thread	November 21, 2025	English

== Upcoming original films ==
=== Feature films ===
Title	Genre	Release	Language
Ébano	Romantic drama	TBA	Spanish
Throttled	Romantic drama	2027	English
Phoolan	Biographical drama	TBA	Hindi
Red, White & Royal Wedding	Romantic comedy	TBA	English
The Summer I Turned Pretty: The Movie	Romantic drama	TBA	English

=== In development ===
Title	Genre
Black, White & Blue	Drama
Funny Business	Animated comedy
Marília	Biographical drama
