= Gabriel G. Mourreau =

Spanish actor (born 2001)

Gabriel Guevara
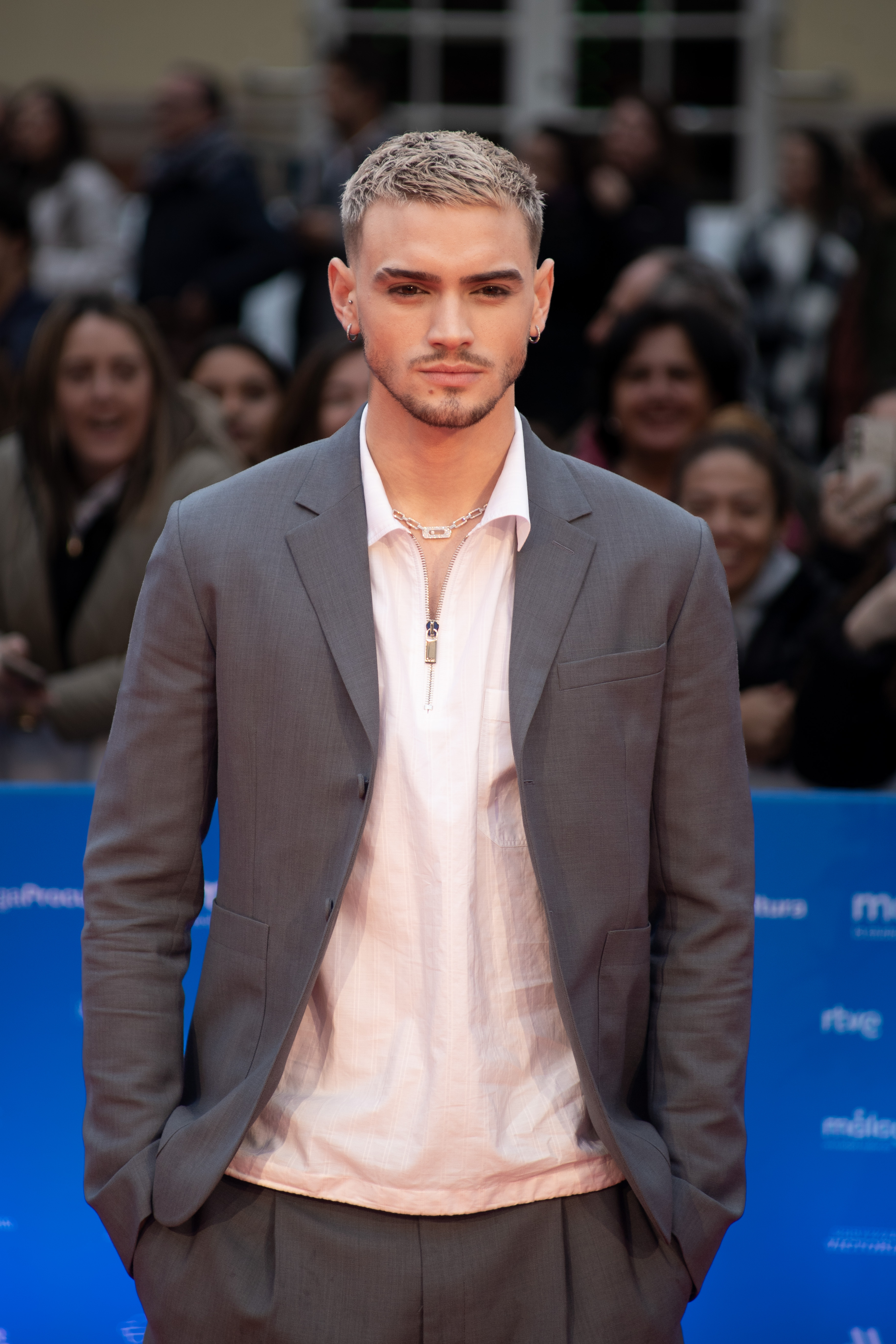
- Guevara in 2024
- Born: 6 February 2001 (age 25); Madrid, Spain
- Education: Instituto Lope de Vega (2018)
- Occupations: Actor; model
- Years active: 2010–2012; 2017–present
- Notable work: HIT; How to Screw It All Up; Raising Voices; Red Flags; Skam España; Culpables trilogy (My 𐄁 Your 𐄁 Our Fault)
- Partner: María de Nati (2024–present)
- Parent: Marlène Mourreau (mother)

Gabriel Alejandro Guevara Mourreau (born 6 February 2001) is a Spanish-Cuban and French actor. He starred as Nick Leister in the Spanish film adaptations of Mercedes Ron's Culpables trilogy—My Fault (2023), Your Fault (2024), and Our Fault (2025), the first of which became the most-watched non-English language film on Amazon Prime Video in the year of its debut.

Guevara is also known for his recurring role in the first two seasons of the Spanish teen drama Skam España, as well as starring roles in the television drama HIT and the Disney+ science fiction series Desde el mañana (English: From Tomorrow).

== Early life ==
Gabriel Alejandro Guevara Mourreau was born and raised in Madrid, Spain, by his mother, Marléne Mourreau—a French vedette, model, actress and television presenter—and his father, Michel Guevara, a Cuban dancer. Much like his parents, he was drawn towards artistic pursuits at an early age, participating in advertising campaigns and small acting roles as an extra, as well as undergoing formal dance training.

Guevara graduated from Instituto Lope de Vega with a Baccalaureate of Performing Arts in 2018. He is bilingual in both Spanish and French, and is proficient in English.

== Career ==
=== Film and television (2018–present) ===
In late 2018, Guevara made his television debut as Cristian Miralles Haro in the first season of Skam España, the Spanish adaptation of Skam, a Norwegian teen drama series that focused on the daily life of teenagers and their struggles. He went on to appear in twelve episodes of the series between seasons one and two.

He made his feature film debut in the 2020 Swedish drama film Charter. The film was later selected as the Swedish entry for the Best International Feature Film at the 93rd Academy Awards, but did not make the shortlist. That same year, he appeared as Cristofer in Señoras del (h)AMPA and as Samu in the television series Riders.

Guevara's next major role came in the 2020 TVE series HIT, a high school drama about an unconventional educator tasked with turning around troubled institutions. He starred as main character Darío Carvajal Aguirre for the first two seasons.

In 2022, Guevara made a guest appearance as choreographer Nacho Duato in the Paramount+ original series Bosé. He went on to appear as young Charly in the Amazon Prime Video film Tomorrow Is Today (Spanish: Mañana es hoy), the first original Spanish film produced for the platform. He also reunited with Estíbaliz Burgaleta—head writer of Skam España—for the Netflix series You Are Not Special (Spanish: Tú no eres especial), in which he appeared as the character Asier. In the same year, he appeared as Fran in the HBO Max series How to Screw It All Up (Spanish: Cómo mandarlo todo a la mierda).

Guevara's breakthrough role came in 2023, when he starred as Nick Leister in the Amazon Prime Video romance film My Fault (Spanish: Culpa mía). The wealthy son of a successful Spanish businessman, his character is involved in the dangerous street racing scene and later begins an illicit romance with his stepsister, Noah Morán, played by his Skam España co-star Nicole Wallace. My Fault is based on the popular Culpables novel series originally published on Wattpad by Mercedes Ron. According to Prime Video, My Fault attained the highest opening three-day viewership figures of any non-English local original film in the history of the service after its release in June 2023. The film was followed by two sequels, 2024's Your Fault (Spanish: Culpa tuya) and 2025's Our Fault (Spanish: Culpa nuestra), which were filmed concurrently and which are based on the second and third books in Ron's original trilogy.

Furthermore, Guevara appeared in the Spanish television series Red Flags as Jorge in 2024, followed by the Netflix miniseries Raising Voices (Spanish: Ni una más), based on the novel of the same name by Miguel Sáez Carral. Portraying the character Alberto, Raising Voices reunited Guevara with his former Culpables and Skam España co-star Nicole Wallace. In the same year, he reunited with another of his Culpables co-stars, Marta Hazas, in the Disney+ science fiction series From Tomorrow (Spanish: Desde el mañana).

=== Stage (2010–present) ===
Outside his television and film career, Guevara has been active in opera and theater productions, first appearing in the Royal Theater opera production Tosca in 2010. He then appeared in Robin Hood, a 2012 theater production in France, and the Krol Roger opera in 2018. Gabriel also worked with his father in Italy on the 2017 opera L'Elixir d'amore.

== Legal issues ==
Guevara was arrested on 2 September 2023 in Venice, Italy, on an international warrant for an alleged sexual assault that had taken place in France. He was set to receive a "Best Young Actor" award from Filming Italy, which was canceled in the wake of his arrest. On 3 September 2023 Guevara's acting representation, Brosson Talent Management, released a statement to the public, saying, "It is an old process in France, when Gabriel was a minor and in Spain, it has already been resolved in his favor with all the acquittals. We hope that he will be released shortly, once the retention error that we understand to be irregular is verified." Guevara's lawyer, Pedro Fernández González, followed up on this statement, saying the case for which he was accused and then acquitted took place when Guevara was 13 years old, and the complainant was his cousin, "who got angry at him." A hearing of the case was scheduled for Monday, September 4, and he was later released that same day, with a condition of his release being that he could not leave Venice until the case was resolved. On 15 September 2023 the Venetian Court of Appeals declared the arrest warrant and extradition request against Guevara null and void, and he was allowed to return home to Madrid.

Prime Video, the streaming service behind the My Fault film franchise, also confirmed they were conducting their own independent investigation into the matter, per their lawyers.

The charges against Guevara were subsequently dropped after the Venetian court of appeals declared the warrant and extradition request null and void. Guevara was released and resumed filming the final two films in the Culpables series.

== Filmography ==
=== Film ===
Year	Title	Role
2018	Charter	Manuel
2022	Tomorrow Is Today	Young Charly
2023	My Fault	Nick Leister
2024	Your Fault	Nick Leister
2025	Our Fault	Nick Leister

=== Television ===
Year	Title	Role	Notes
2018–2019	Skam España	Cristian "Cris" Miralles Haro	Recurring role; 12 episodes (seasons 1–2)
2020	Señoras del (h)AMPA	Cristofer	Guest role; 2 episodes
2020	Riders	Samu	Main role
2020–2021	HIT	Darío Carvajal Aguirre	Main role; 11 episodes (seasons 1–2)
2022	You Are Not Special	Asier	Main role; 6 episodes
2022	Bosé	Nacho Duato	Guest role; 1 episode
2022	How to Screw It All Up	Fran	Main role; 6 episodes
2024	Red Flags	Jorge	Recurring role; 8 episodes
2024	Raising Voices	Alberto Gaspar	Miniseries
2024	From Tomorrow	Mikel Minondo Ascunce	Lead role; 8 episodes
2025	Mar Afuera	Alvaro	Lead Role; 8 episodes
2026	Por Cien Millones	Gabi	Lead Role; 3 episodes

=== Stage ===
Year	Title	Venue/Location	Notes
2010	Tosca	Teatro Real, Madrid, Spain	Opera
2012	Robin Hood	France	Theater
2017	L'Elixir d'amore	Macerata, Italy	Opera
2018	Krol Roger		Opera
