= Nicole Wallace (actress) =

Spanish actress (born 2002)

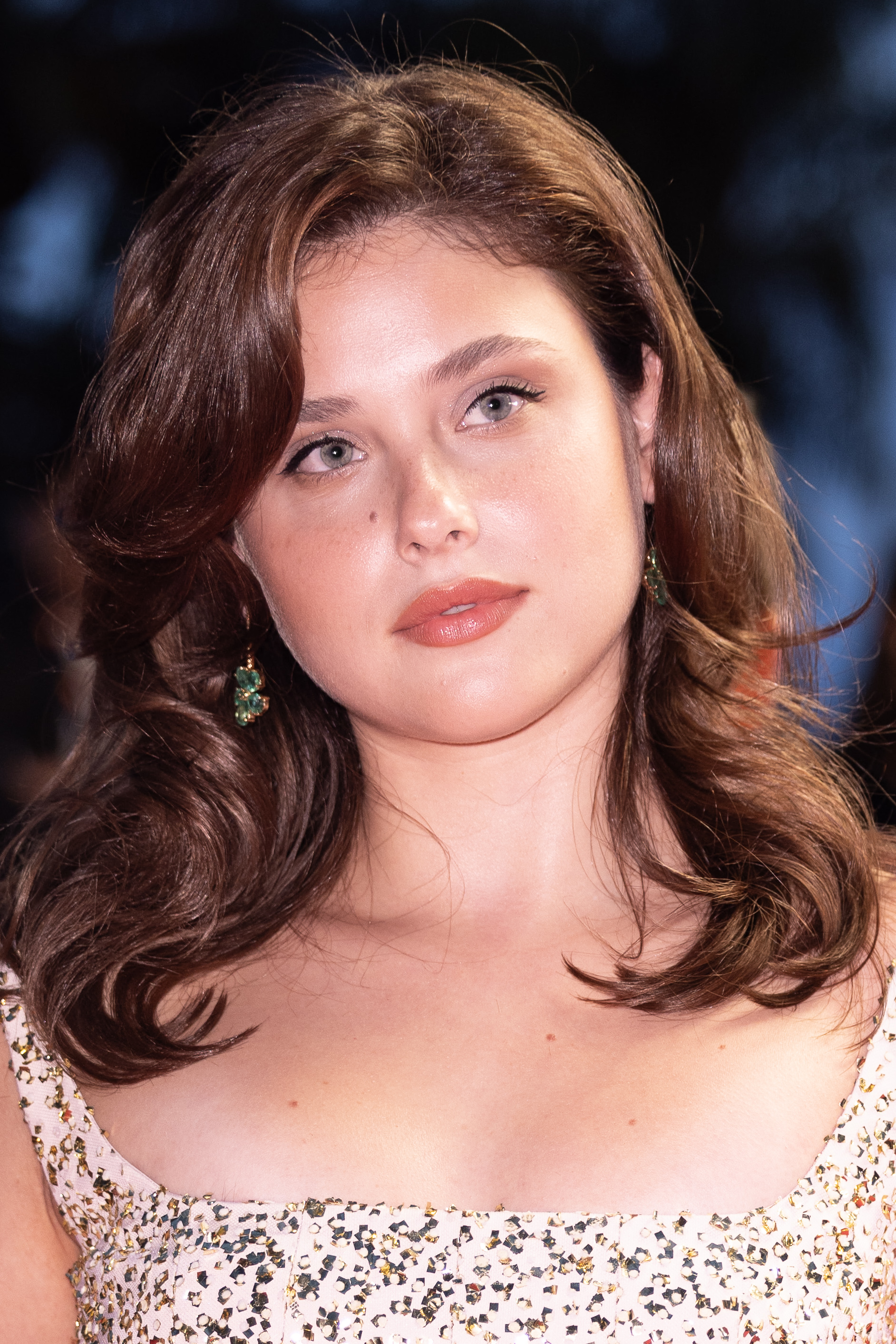
- Wallace in 2025
- Born: Nicole Alejandra Wallace del Barrio; 22 March 2002 (age 24); Madrid, Spain
- Citizenship: Spain; United States
- Occupation: Actress
- Years active: 2008–present

Nicole Alejandra Wallace del Barrio (born 22 March 2002) is a Spanish and American actress. After her television debut in the teen series Skam España, she has starred in the films My Fault (2023), Your Fault (2024), One Year and One Day (2025), and Our Fault (2025), and the miniseries Raising Voices (2024).

== Early and personal life ==
Nicole Alejandra Wallace del Barrio was born in Madrid on 22 March 2002. She holds Spanish and U.S. citizenship, and her father is American and her mother Spanish. Because of this, Wallace is bilingual, and can speak both Spanish and English fluently.

She grew up learning how to play the viola and piano, and took singing lessons from an early age. Wallace has also practiced hip-hop, funk, and modern dance for more than eight years.

She also has an older sister, Chloé, who is a director, writer, and photographer, who directed the Netflix limited series A Perfect Story and the Wattpad adaptation film Mala influencia.

Wallace studied psychology through a distance-learning program at a university for a year, while continuing her career as an actress.

== Career ==
=== Acting (2008; 2017–present) ===
==== The beginning: Stylish Short films and Skam Spain ====
Wallace got her start in short films, first appearing in the 2008 horror short Excision in a small role, opposite actress Tessa Ferrer of Grey's Anatomy fame. She later continued working in short films, appearing in the VR horror Campfire Creepers: The Skull of Sam in 2017 as Vicky, co-starring with horror film legend Robert Englund, best known for portraying Freddy Krueger in the Nightmare on Elm Street film franchise.

In 2018, Wallace then rose to fame after being cast as Nora Grace in the Movistar+ series, Skam España, based on the Norwegian teen series, Skam. The third season of the show centered around her character, Nora, and the character of Viri, played by Celia Monedero. Nora and Viri's season, in particular, was awarded the "Cima TV Award for Equality" from the FesTVal de Vitoria for how it promoted themes of feminism and empowerment to a youth audience.

At the same time, Wallace continued to build a diverse résumé make appearances in various other short films. These included 2019's VR fairytale Ray Sparks (directed by Rafael Pavón), which was nominated for 'Best Interactive Narrative Experience' at the Raindance Film Festival. She also lead the cast of 2021's relationship drama La fuerza del Destino, directed by Javier Alonso. She has continued this success into other acting roles as well, starring in the TVE 2021 drama, Parot.

==== 'Culpables' Phenomenon ====
In 2023, Wallace achieved international stardom with Prime Video romance film, My Fault as Noah, who is drawn into a forbidden romance with her stepbrother, Nick, who's involved in the dangerous street racing scene. It was filmed over the summer of 2022 and Nick is played by Wallace's Skam España co-star, Gabriel Guevara. Her Parot co-star Ivan Massague played Noah's father. My Fault is based on a popular novel series originally published on Wattpad, called Culpables, by Mercedes Ron. According to Amazon Prime Video, My Fault attained the highest opening three-day viewership figures of any non-English local original film in the history of the service after its release in June 2023. Prime Video then confirmed in July 2023 that they would produce two more movies based on the final two books in Mercedes Ron's trilogy, Your Fault and Our Fault, confirming that Wallace would reprise her role as Noah in these two films.

Your Fault and Our Fault began concurrent production on August 31, 2023. The same month, Wallace appeared in the Steffy Argelich film, Vera, as Vera, a teenager discovering her sexuality as a young man comes to stay with her and her mother on an island retreat, away from his responsibilities as a lawyer and a son.

She also appeared in the 2023 short film Echo as Maya, and in the 2024 short film Aorta directed by Andrea Suárez.

==== Cover Queen and Dior Ambassador ====
Since her breakout role as Nora, Wallace has been featured in many publications, such as SModa, Glamour, and Vogue.

On September 1, 2023, Wallace was also announced as the first Dior beauty ambassador from Spain. She went on to make appearances during the 2023 Paris Fashion Week at Dior and other associated brand events later that same month.

==== Raising her voice, raising her status ====
In May 2024, Wallace appeared in a Netflix television miniseries, Raising Voices (aka Ni una más), based on the novel of the same name by Miguel Sáez Carral. It was filmed in the Autumn of 2022 and she played Alma, a teenager who upends the status quo at her high school by speaking up about her rape. The role raised Wallace's status as a highly convincing dramatic actress and she was nominated for various awards.

==== "The rare kind of deep story that stays with you" ====
In June 2024, Wallace relocated to Chile to begin filming the Prime Video limited series The House of the Spirits. It is produced by American actress Eva Longoria and features a star-studded Latin American cast that captures the socio-political significance of Isabel Allende's beloved novel. Wallace has spoken openly about her joy upon being cast after a successful Los Angeles-based audition, with it being adapted from her mother's favorite novel. Also, given its scope of deep-rooted autobiographical history plus the focus on strong women, the series was the catalyst for rediscovering her love for screen projects. She has also emphasized that the spiritual side of Clara really resonated with her upon reading the script, to the point where she made Pinterest boards as a way to illustrate her fascination with the character.

Your Fault, the sequel to My Fault, was released on December 27, 2024 on Amazon Prime Video. Wallace attended its world premiere at the Palacio Vistalegre in Madrid on December 18, with an estimated attendance of 4,000 fans.

==== Signing with American Management ====
On December 19, 2024, Deadline Hollywood reported that Wallace had signed with TFC Management for representation in the United States.

Furthermore, It was announced on October 15, 2026 that Wallace had signed with United Talent Agency (UTA) for representation in all areas.

==== Indie films, adiós Culpables, ciao to Italy and a New York state of mind ====
In March 2025, Wallace appeared in the holiday romance drama Un año y un día (aka One Year and One Day), written and directed by Alejandro San Martin. She stars as Nerea, an aspiring performer who reignites life into a heartbroken man. It was filmed in 2023, and had its premiere at the 28th Málaga Film Festival. The film is currently available to stream worldwide on Amazon Prime Video, and in Spain on Netflix.

In October 2025, Wallace appeared in Our Fault, the third and final movie of the Culpables series. On the week of its world premiere in Ibiza, Variety reported that Wallace had signed an exclusive talent holding deal with Amazon MGM Studios, under which she landed a leading role in the English-language Italian television series Postcards From Italy. The series is directed by Oscar winner Jessica Yu and Wallace has spoken of her excitement for audiences to see her in a comedy role, and playing her own age for a change.

==== An F1 debut ====
In September 2026, Wallace was confirmed to play Maya Alatorre in the motorsport romance Throttled, based on the first instalment of the popular Dirty Air book series written by Lauren Asher. The character is the lead female protagonist who is caught in the middle of a tense rivalry between two Formula One (F1) racers. The film's lead sequence choreographer is Luciano Bacheta, a former FIA Formula Two champion-turned stunt driver, whose most recent and critically acclaimd work was on F1 the Movie. Throttled will be released on Amazon Prime Video and Elizabeth Banks serves as a leading producer.

=== Music (2020–present) ===
==== 'Bella' ====
In 2020, Wallace signed with Universal Music and Sony Music, releasing her first single, Bella, in February 2021. It debuted as one of the Top 50 viral songs in Spain that year, which was quickly followed up by singles Devuélveme and Impatient Eyes. A fourth single, Cuídate, was released in 2022.

==== Playing and performing as Nerea ====
Wallace performed two songs for the official movie soundtrack of One Year and One Day (in which her character Nerea was an aspiring singer), Tres Días and Cyrano. It was released in 2025 and all tracks are available to listen to on YouTube and Spotify.

=== Producing (2026-present) ===
==== Sistersdelhood Films ====
Spanish news outlet El Confidencial reported in October 2026 that Wallace and her sister Chloé have launched a joint audiovisual production company named Sistersdelhood Films - specifically named in accordance with the positive relationships between women, and combining the talents of Nicole on screen and her sister behind the camera. This empowers them with creative control over any future films, television series or documentaries they make, and further paves the way for Nicole's independent success as she branches out into international projects.

== Awards ==
=== Premios Produ 2026 ===
On 9 November 2026, it was announced that Wallace was the winner of the Premios Produ 2026 award for Best Lead Actress in a Historical, Political or Social Drama Series (as Clara del Valle Trueba in Prime Video's The House of the Spirits). The winners' gala will take place on 10 December.

== Filmography ==
=== Television ===
Year	Title	Character	Notes
2018–2020	Skam España	Nora Grace	Main cast; 38 episodes & central character of season 3
2021	Parot	Sol	Main cast; 10 episodes
2024	Raising Voices	Alma	Lead role; 8 episodes
2026	The House of the Spirits	Clara del Valle	Lead role, second of three Clara actresses; 4 episodes
2027	Postcards from Italy	Mia	Lead role, first English language TV role; 6 episodes

=== Film ===
Year	Title	Character	Type	Notes
2008	Excision	Dead Girl #3	Short	
2017	Campfire Creepers: The Skull of Sam	Vicky	Short	Filmed in virtual reality (VR); Credited as "Nichole Wallace"
2018	Post millennial	Nicole	Short	
2019	Ray Sparks		Short	Filmed in VR
2021	La fuerza del Destino	Eva	Short	Co-starring Emmanuel Medina
2023	My Fault	Noah Morán	Feature	First in Culpables trilogy
2023	Vera	Vera	Short	
2023	Echo	Maya	Short	
2024	Aorta		Short	
2024	Your Fault	Noah Morán	Feature	Second in Culpables trilogy
2025	One Year and One Day	Nerea	Feature	Lead actress and singer
2025	Our Fault	Noah Morán	Feature	Third in Culpables trilogy
TBA	Throttled	Maya Alatorre	Feature	First English language feature film role

== Discography ==
=== Music ===
Year	Title	Notes
2021	"Bella"	Single
2021	"Devuélveme"	
2021	"Impatient Eyes"	
2022	"Cuídate"	
2025	"Tres Días"	Featured in One Year and One Day
2025	"Cyrano"	Featured in One Year and One Day
