= Raising Voices (TV series) =

Spanish teen drama television miniseries

- Promotional release poster
- Spanish: Ni una más
- Written by: Miguel Sáez Carral; Isa Sánchez
- Directed by: Eduard Cortés; David Ulloa; Marta Font
- Starring: Nicole Wallace; Clara Galle; Aïcha Villaverde
- Country of origin: Spain
- Original language: Spanish
- No. of episodes: 8

Production
- Executive producers: José Manuel Lorenzo; Miguel Sáez Carral
- Running time: 45 minutes
- Production company: DLO Producciones

Original release
- Network: Netflix
- Release: 31 May 2024

Raising Voices (Spanish: Ni una más) is a Spanish teen drama television miniseries based on the novel by Miguel Sáez Carral. It stars Nicole Wallace, Clara Galle, and Aïcha Villaverde. The series premiered on 31 May 2024 on Netflix.

== Plot ==
At the start of the film we see the main character, Alma putting up a sign at her school, “warning, a sexual predator is in here”, referring to her history teacher, who was a sexual predator to many, including Berta, Alma’s friend who later commits suicide after the trauma. After this scene at the start of the movie, we flash back, and the story begins recounting the events that led up to that moment.

== Cast ==
- Nicole Wallace as Alma
- Clara Galle as Greta
- Aïcha Villaverde as Nata
- Teresa de Mera as Berta
- José Pastor as David
- Gabriel Guevara as Alberto
- Eloy Azorín
- Ruth Díaz
- Iván Massagué

== Production ==
Based on the novel of the same name by Miguel Sáez Carral, the series was written by Sáez Carral along with Isa Sánchez. A DLO Producciones production, the miniseries was executively produced by José Manuel Lorenzo and Miguel Sánchez Carral while Eduard Cortés, David Ulloa, and Marta Font took over direction duties.

== Release ==
The 8-episode miniseries debuted on Netflix on 31 May 2024.

== Reception ==
Tom Ryan of The Age described it as smartly shaped and emotionally powerful.

The series reported to have grossed millions of views in 2024 with 25.40M views in the first half of 2024, and 9.1M in the second half of the year.

== See also ==
- 2024 in Spanish television
