= Our Fault =

- Promotional release poster
- Spanish: Culpa nuestra
- Directed by: Domingo González
- Screenplay by: Domingo González; Sofía Cuenca
- Based on: Culpa nuestra by Mercedes Ron
- Produced by: Álex de la Iglesia; Carolina Bang
- Starring: Nicole Wallace; Gabriel Guevara
- Production company: Pokeepsie Films
- Distributed by: Amazon Prime Video
- Release date: 16 October 2025
- Running time: 113 minutes
- Country: Spain
- Languages: English; Spanish

Our Fault (Spanish: Culpa nuestra) is a 2025 Spanish romantic drama film directed by Domingo González and co-written by Sofía Cuenca which stars Nicole Wallace and Gabriel Guevara. It is the third and final installment of the Prime Video adaptation of the Culpables Saga by Mercedes Ron, following My Fault (2023) and Your Fault (2024).

The film had its global premiere on October 1st, 2025 at the Destino Pacha Ibiza Resort, then was released worldwide on October 16th, 2025 on Amazon Prime Video.

== Plot ==
Four years after their breakup (see Your Fault), Nick and Noah are both invited to their best friends' Lion and Jenna's Ibiza wedding. He is now a high-powered executive for his family's multinational company LCR. Seeing Nick on the cover of Forbes, Noah is visibly affected.

Until given her dress for the wedding Noah does not realise she is the maid-of-honor. Protesting, as she will have to stand with bestman Nick, Jenna insists that everything will be okay. Noah must ride to the rehearsal dinner with Nick, where they subtly antagonise each other. He continues to do so at the dinner, yet still has her name tattooed on his arm.

At the wedding reception, Noah and Nick are continually made to be close. At one point, they both point out how ridiculously obvious it is, however moments later they are in each others' arms. After sleeping together, Noah reveals she saw the message Nick had left written on her father's headstone, he retorts that he cannot forget catching her cheating on him, then leaves.

After graduating with an English-Spanish degree, Noah is having difficulty finding a job. She interviews for the tech company LRB. The CEO is Simón, who she had met on the flight there. Noah is hired, later he convinces her to go on a date, during which she suggests they take it slow.

As LRB is looking for investors, and Nick's company needs to improve its image, he inadvertently buys into it. Nick is surprised to find Noah working there. He tries to antagonise her at every turn. At Christmas, as their parents are still married, the conflict continues.

Nick continues to put the pressure on at work, prohibiting relationships between employees. The frustrated Noah quits, supposedly to continue dating Simón. Nick's mother Anabel signs over custody of Maggie to their father, after being diagnosed with leukemia. Nick convinces Noah he does not want to sleep alone, so they are again intimate. When he wakes in the morning, she is gone.

As the teary Noah drives away, she realises she is bleeding. Concerned, she visits her gynecologist at the hospital, and is shocked to discover she is four months pregnant. Michael, her former college neighbor and college counselor, overhears and uncovers her file.

When Noah tells Jenna about her pregnancy, her friend happily invites her to stay with her and Lion. Afterwards, Jenna tells her husband, but insists he keep it quiet from Nick.

Michael meets with Sofia at the hospital, needing her to rescind the accusation of his deviant behavior while he worked at the college. When Sofia says she cannot, Michael asks if maybe Nick could be convinced. Then he pulls out Noah's ultrasound with all of the information about the pregnancy. Michael mentions the pair have been working together at LSB, which Sofia did not know. As, according to the public she and Nick are together, the news would hurt her father's political career.

Nick and Sophia run into Simon and Noah in a dance club. Seeing them together, Nick gets jealous. So, when he can, he pulls Noah aside to kiss her. Sofia is distracted dancing with Simon. Just when she is about to catch up with the other two, Nick leads Noah out, as she is feeling unwell.

Taking Noah home, she reiterates they both have to move on. A little while later, Anabel succumbs to the leukemia, so again the whole family reunites for the funeral. A short time later, as her pregnancy is becoming too obvious, Noah decides to move to Santander to live with an aunt permanently.

Meanwhile, Nick and Sophia break up, so she suggests he stop holding grudges and go after Noah. Following her advice he finds her, just before she leaves from Jenna and Lion's. Nick sees that Noah is pregnant and, after a bit of a chase, he catches up to her at her mother's.

A disgruntled employee of LCR shot Nick in revenge. Months later, he wakes from a coma. The couple is happily together with a baby until the demented Briar and Michael come to take the baby. After a struggle both she and Michael are defeated. Months later, Noah and Nick finally marry.

== Cast ==
- Nicole Wallace as Noah Moran-Leister (Nick's ex-girlfriend and eventual wife)
- Gabriel Guevara as Nicholas "Nick" Leister (Noah's ex-boyfriend and eventual husband)
- Fran Morcillo as Simón Roger (Noah's boss and love interest)
- Marta Hazas as Rafaella
- Iván Sánchez as William
- Goya Toledo as Anabel
- Víctor Varona as Lion
- Eva Ruiz as Jenna
- Gabriela Andrada as Sofía (Nick's PR girlfriend)
- Daniela Casas as Maggie (Nick's sister)
- Álex Béjar as Briar (Nick's vengeful ex-girlfriend)
- Javier Morgade as Michael (Briar's friend and Noah's former tutor/fling)
- Felipe Londoño as Luca (Lion's brother and Noah's ex)

== Production ==
Our Fault is a Pokeepsie Films (Álex de la Iglesia and Carolina Bang) production. Shooting took place simultaneously with Your Fault's in order to cut costs. The filming included cast members from previous films plus the addition of Fran Morcillo.

== Release ==
The film was released on Amazon Prime Video on 16 October 2025.

== Reception ==
John Serba of Decider.com gave the film a negative recommendation, warning potential viewers to buckle up for the "most insipid not-enough-schtup drama possibly ever".

== See also ==
- List of Spanish films of 2025
