= Dibujando el cielo =

- Film poster
- Directed by: Ana Laura Calderón
- Written by: Ricardo Avilés; Christopher Hool
- Starring: Maite Perroni; Iván Sánchez; Christian Vásquez
- Cinematography: Gerardo Barroso
- Edited by: Aldo Alvarez Morales
- Music by: Diego Benlliure; Héctor Ruiz; Juan Andrés Vergara; Carlos Vertiz
- Release date: 31 August 2018
- Country: Mexico
- Language: Spanish

Dibujando el cielo (lit. 'Drawing the sky') is a 2018 Mexican romantic comedy film directed by Ana Laura Calderón. The film premiered on 31 August 2018, and is stars Maite Perroni, Iván Sánchez, and Christian Vázquez.

== Plot ==
Throughout her life, Sofía (Maite Perroni) has tried to stay away from commitments and routines. As one of the youngest and most successful astrophysicists, she has dedicated her attention and energy in space and the sky, without paying attention to things like love or company. Among her various investigations, Sofia begins to identify chaotic elements of space and its operation with her own personal and professional life. The situation will get complicated when she meet Gerardo (Christian Vásquez), a colleague from the institute who seems to have the opposite elements to her. However, understanding the laws of the universe, Sofia will begin to want to solve her life and her new relationship with Gerardo following the same principles she uses to solve her work. Gradually, the girl's attention will move away from space and focus on what is around her. And although everything looks like a fairy tale, she won't be able to decide between two loves that could balance her life and her work.

== Cast ==
- Maite Perroni as Sofía
- Iván Sánchez as Raúl
- Christian Vásquez as Gerardo
- Claudia Ramírez as Marifer
- Ximena Romo as Marla
- Ana Layevska as Silvia
