= Your Fault (film) =

2024 Spanish film directed by Domingo González

- Promotional release poster
- Spanish: Culpa tuya
- Directed by: Domingo González
- Screenplay by: Domingo González; Sofía Cuenca
- Based on: Culpa tuya by Mercedes Ron
- Produced by: Álex de la Iglesia; Carolina Bang
- Starring: Nicole Wallace; Gabriel Guevara
- Production companies: Pokeepsie Films; Amazon MGM Studios
- Distributed by: Amazon Prime Video
- Release dates: 18 December 2024 (Palacio Vistalegre); 27 December 2024 (Spain)
- Running time: 118 minutes
- Country: Spain
- Language: Spanish

Your Fault (Spanish: Culpa tuya) is a 2024 Spanish romantic drama film directed by Domingo González based on the Culpables series by Mercedes Ron which stars Nicole Wallace and Gabriel Guevara.

The film is the follow-up to My Fault (2023) and the precursor to Our Fault (2025) in the trilogy.

Your Fault premiered on December 27, 2024 on Amazon Prime. It became the most watched non-English language film ever streamed on the platform.

== Plot ==
On Noah Moran’s 18th birthday, her secret boyfriend Nick Leister is away doing a law internship in San Francisco. Melancholy, as her abusive father Jonás died a year ago, her closest friend Jenna reminds her they are about to graduate. Noah takes contraception and longs to be reunited with Nick. He makes a surprise entrance, gifting Noah with a heart shaped necklace and they embrace.

Nick and Noah have a fun summer with Lion and Jenna, but at a beach party, the men watch their girlfriends dance and Lion makes Nick scared that long-distance relationships are doomed to fail. Determined to prove him wrong, Nick rents a apartment nearby to Noah's college in a bid to see her more often. They get passionate, but Nick's confused reaction to Noah referring to the place as their shared one makes her feel embarrassed and insecure.

At a nightclub, Noah has girl-talk with Jenna over Nick's prior hesitancy, who boils the issue down to his fears of abandonment - specifically how his mother just up and left. Simultaneously, Nick confesses to Lion that his love for Noah cannot derail his mental block when the topic of commitment arises. Lion can only ramble about his overwhelming social and financial inadequacy. He fears disappointing his brother Luca over upholding the family business.

Rafaella and Noah tour her college flat. There, Noah meets Briar, her beautiful yet mysterious roommate. At Leister Enterprises, William introduces Nick to fellow intern and recent Harvard graduate Sophia. He recognizes her from childhood, but knowing his bad boy reputation, she dismisses his small-talk as an attempt to get her into bed.

Rafaella shows Noah a photo they intercepted, reminding her to be careful due to the rumors of her being a gold digger. Noah is furious about the breach of privacy and argues with her mother about the seriousness of her feelings for Nick. Rafaella Uncomfortable, Noah leaves for her apartment. Briar is throwing a house party, but quickly ends it. The next door neighbor and university counselor Michael pops in to introduce himself.

Nick insists to Noah that relocating his work to Spain will be no issue. However, he becomes distracted and is strangely evasive when Noah is curious about what his new co-worker is like. It is revealed that Rafaela and William had actually hired Sofia to potentially break up Nick and Noah.

Anabel, Nick and Maggie's mother who abandoned him 10 years ago, constantly calls him. She corners him upon collecting Maggie, but he leaves without a word. Nick and Noah spend the afternoon together then, dropping her off at her apartment, he discovers Briar is her roommate, but hides they know each other.

Lion inadvertently thrusts Nick back into his past life. As his garage faces financial ruin, he agrees to deliver an unknown substance, which Nick verifies is cocaine. Lion enters the pool hall alone, but Nick, then Noah follow close behind. They manage to get out, but get arrested.

When Noah stops home for her things, she comes across a dinner party with Nick, their parents, Sofía and her parents, William's longtime friends. They insinuate that one day Nick and Sofía might become a couple. Distraught by the gossip and Nick's forgetfulness regarding the timing of her kidnapping, she later warns him that their miscommunication and dishonesty is exhausting her.

Anabel manipulates Noah into letting her into the Leisters'. There, the older woman distracts her with photos of the extramarital affair between Rafaella and William. Anabel then steals William's toothbrush.

Nick and Sofía are sent to fight a case in London. He meets with his grandfather Andrew, who reveals he took care of the psychologically delicate Briar. The intern lawyers win their case. During the trip, Nick repeatedly checks that Noah stays in his apartment, which Briar gets wind of.

Briar coaxes Noah back into their apartment, where they party with Michael until she feigns sleepiness. He then almost seduces her, but she rejects him. Just as Noah is letting Michael out, Nick appears. His jealousy angers her, so she suggests they end it. Then Nick gives her a two-week ultimatum - decide about them by the Gala or he accepts a promotion that involves moving to London.

Meanwhile, Lion proposes they participate in a rally for 15,000 on Gala night, believing Jenna and Noah will be distracted. However, the two show up to compete. Unbeknownst to everyone, Briar calls the cops, so the road blocks are lifted. After a harrowing race, Noah and Nick together defeat the recently-released-from-prison Ronnie, so Lion can win.

At the Gala, just as Lion says he is finished with racing and worrying about money, Jenna ends things. Briar, who came with Noah, lets Anabel in. She confronts William, revealing her daughter Maggie is his. Nick is angry Noah was involved, so he breaks up with her, kisses Sofía to hurt her, then abruptly walks away with Sofia on his arm. Noah assumes they are together now and is devastated, but out of sight, Lion jumps in the passenger seat of Nick's car in place of Sofia to lecture Nick on his cruel behaviour.

Briar shows Noah photos which imply Nick is involved with Sofia, so she leaves dejected. Nick returns after a heart to heart with Lion reminded him of his undying love for Noah, but comes across a vengeful Briar who boasts that Noah has left to kill herself. Unaware Briar has stolen her key to their apartment, Noah is left out in the rain with only Michael to turn to. He cunningly switches off her phone so she cannot see Nick's heartfelt apology message and seduces her.

Noah miserably returns to her apartment, but stops at the sight of Nick. Eyeing her up and down, he realizes Noah has slept with Michael, and Noah tearfully walks away as Nick furiously zooms off in his car. Back at the Leister house, Rafaella and William are finally regretting their part in Nick and Noah's relationship breakdown.

Noah visits her father's grave to say a final goodbye to her painful past, then discovers a written message on his headstone from Nick, declaring "I will always be your light in the darkness." She is overcome with sadness.

== Cast ==
- Nicole Wallace as Noah Moran
- Gabriel Guevara as Nicholas "Nick" Leister
- Marta Hazas as Rafaella
- Iván Sánchez as William
- Víctor Varona as Lion
- Eva Ruiz as Jenna
- Goya Toledo as Anabel
- Noah Casas as Maggie
- Gabriela Andrada as Sofía
- Álex Béjar as Briar
- Javier Morgade as Michael
- Felipe Londoño as Luca
- Jaime Ordóñez as Esteban

== Production ==
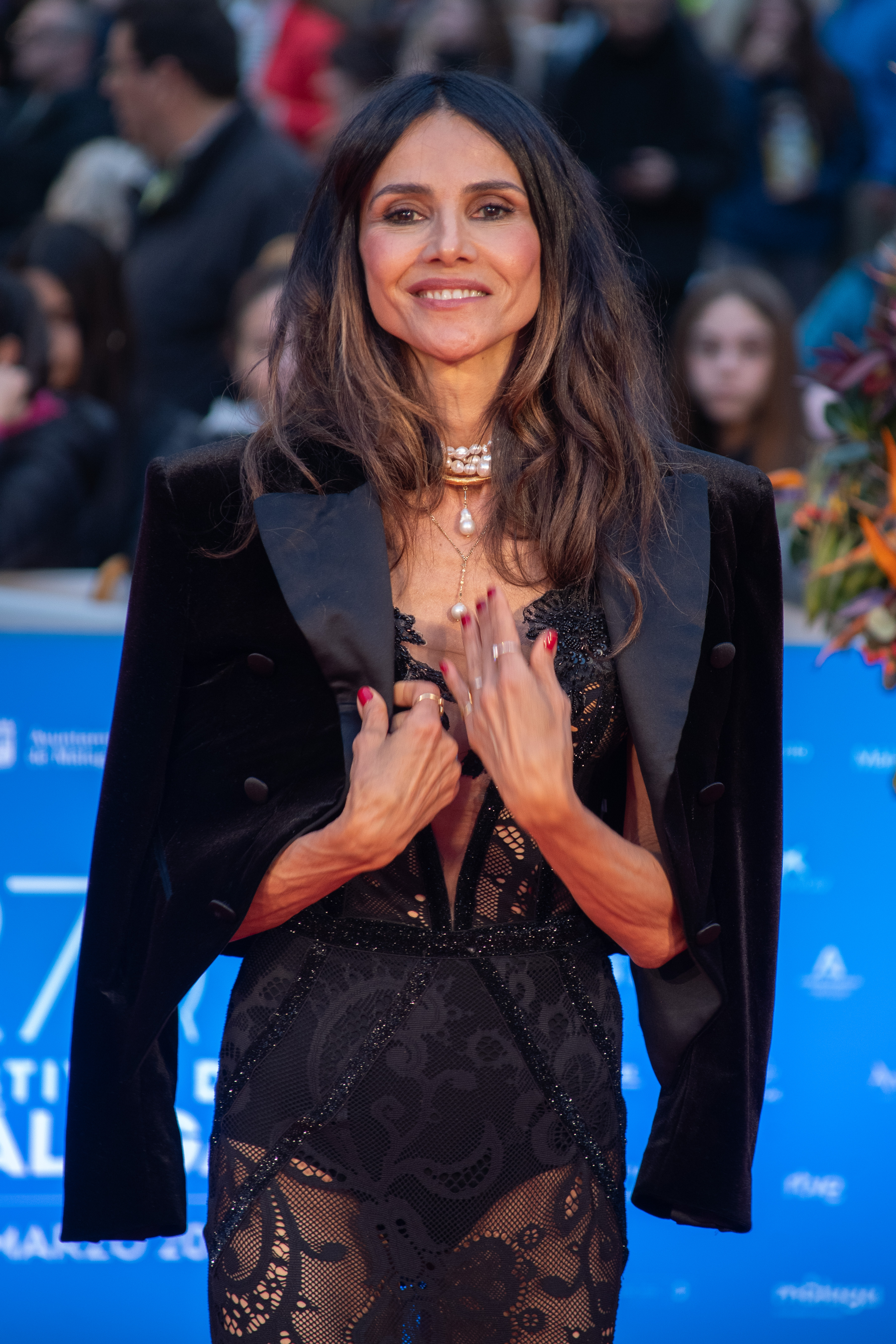
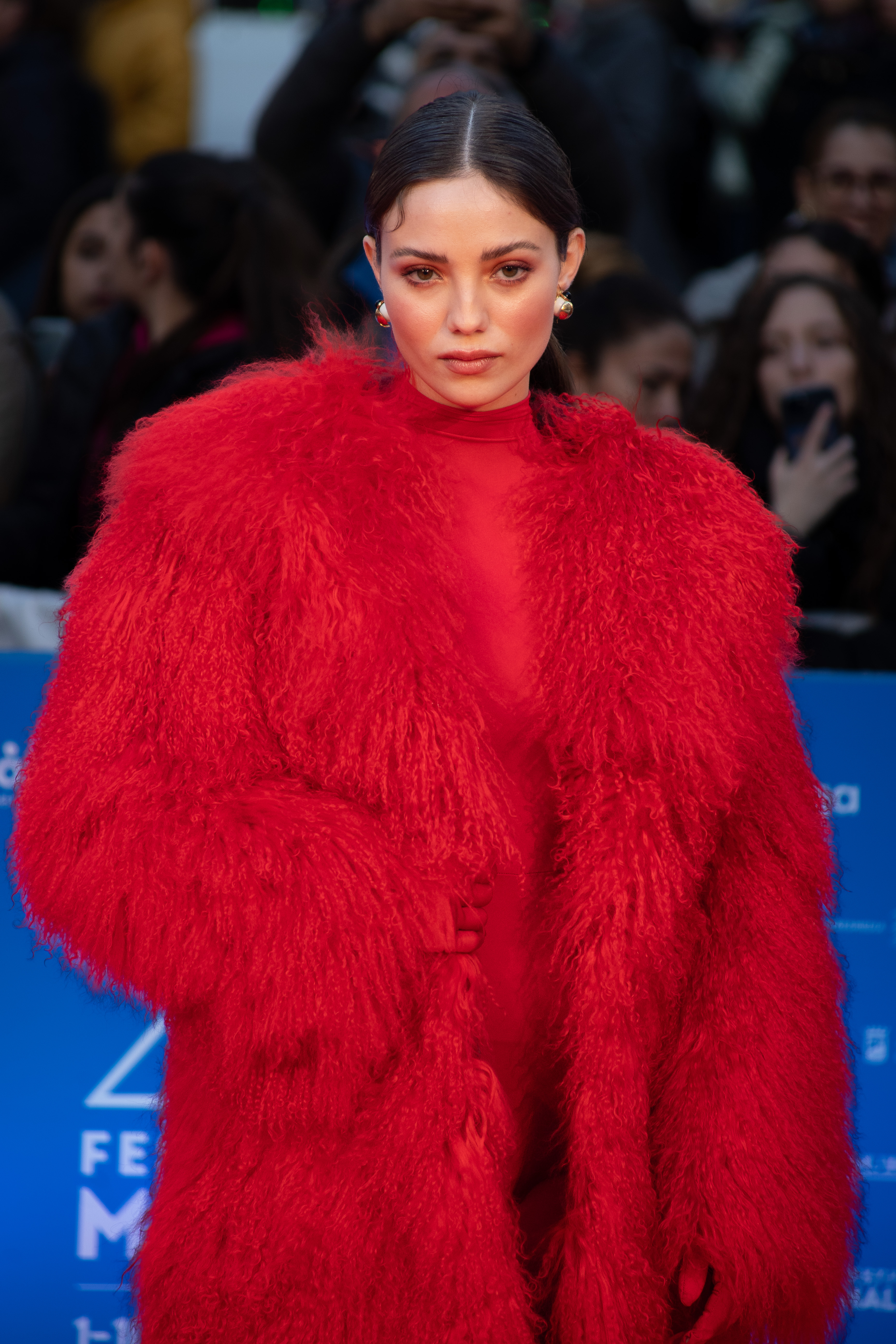
Goya Toledo and Gabriela Andrada (both pictured in 2024) joined the cast for the sequel.

Your Fault, a sequel to My Fault, was shot together with the third installment, Culpa nuestra. The joint shooting of the two films wrapped in Madrid in February 2024. The film is a Banijay Iberia's Pokeepsie Films (Álex de la Iglesia and Carolina Bang) production with Amazon MGM Studios.

== Release ==
The film had a premiere at the Palacio Vistalegre Arena in Madrid on 18 December 2024 in front of 4,000 fans. It became available on Amazon Prime Video on 27 December 2024.

== Reception ==
On the review aggregator website Rotten Tomatoes, 20% of 10 critics' reviews are positive, with an average rating of 4.2/10.

Paula Pardo Luz of Cinemanía rated the film 3 out of 5 stars, writing that it "fulfills its purpose, [as it] entertains and entertains a lot, and leaves you wanting to know what will happen in the third and final installment of the saga".

Peter Bradshaw of The Guardian rated the film 1 out of 5 stars, billing it as a "mind-pulverisingly bizarre and woodenly acted romdram" otherwise making "[any random] daytime TV soap look like Ingmar Bergman".

Alejandro Morillas of ign.com gave the film 6 points ('ok'), conceding that, even if under an "adult and vintage" point of view "we can only look at [the film] with a morbid mixture of horror and fascination", it "is still very entertaining".

Your Fault became the biggest non-English language international (removing viewers in the film's country of origin) original launch on Prime Video to that date.

== Sequel ==
The third and final installment of the series, Our Fault, was released on 16 October 2025.

== See also ==
- List of Spanish films of 2024
