= ChiefsAholic: A Wolf in Chiefs Clothing =

- Directed by: Dylan Sires
- Produced by: Kristian Day; Maggie Gilbride
- Production companies: DreamCrew Entertainment; Five All in the Fifth Entertainment; North of Now Group
- Distributed by: Amazon Prime Video
- Release date: December 24, 2024
- Country: United States
- Language: English

ChiefsAholic: A Wolf in Chiefs Clothing is an American true crime documentary film directed by Dylan Sires. It follows Kansas City Chiefs superfan Xaviar Babudar's secret life as a serial bank robber. It explores his arrest through his own interviews and subsequent legal journey, as well as interviews of other Chiefs fans, a bank teller who was the victim of his final robbery, and Babudar's bail bondsman Michael Lloyd. The film was released on December 24, 2024 on Amazon Prime.

== Production ==
Initial scenes provide the background of Babudar's status as a Chiefs superfan, in which he interacted with other fans on Twitter using the handle ChiefsAholic, attended most games both home and away wearing a wolf costume, and gambled on Chiefs games. After Babudar's arrest in Bixby, Oklahoma in December 2022 on suspicion of bank robbery, documentary producers interviewed Babudar while he was awaiting trial in Oklahoma, having posted bail. Babudar is filmed watching the Chiefs win Super Bowl LVII while wearing an ankle monitor and staying at a hotel. In March 2023, Babudar cut off his ankle monitor and skipped bail, at which point the documentary followed the attempts of bail bondsman Michael Lloyd to locate Babudar and return him to custody in order to avoid an $80,000 charge for failure to adhere to the terms of bail. As more details of Babudar's criminal history are uncovered by investigators, he is accused of committing several other bank robberies. Babudar was convicted for the robbery of more than $800,000 through robberies in the states of Oklahoma, Iowa, Tennessee, Nebraska, Minnesota, Nevada, and California as well as the use of casinos to launder money, and in September 2024 he was sentenced to 17.5 years in prison. In May 2025, Babudar was sentenced to an additional 14.5 years in prison, as deemed appropriate by an Oklahoma courtroom. His total sentence now stands at 32 years.

As of December 2025, Babudar is currently incarcerated at USP Florence High in Florence, Colorado.
