= Trinidad (2026 film) =

- Theatrical release poster
- Directed by: Laura Alvea; José Ortuño
- Written by: Laura Alvea; José Ortuño
- Produced by: Silvia Carvalho
- Starring: Gabriela Andrada; Paz Vega; Guillermo Bedward; Sofía Allepuz; Alfonso Sánchez; Antonio Dechent; James Giblin; Billy Jeffries; Milena Smit; Karla Sofía Gascón
- Cinematography: David Azcano
- Edited by: Fátima de los Santos; Carlos Crespo Arnold
- Production company: Inefable Productions
- Distributed by: Deep Com Roots
- Release dates: 20 December 2026 (IFFI); 4 December 2026 (Spain)
- Country: Spain
- Languages: Spanish; English

Trinidad is a 2026 Spanish Western adventure film directed by Laura Alvea and José Ortuño. Its cast is led by Gabriela Andrada, Paz Vega, and Karla Sofía Gascón.

== Plot ==
19th century. Fleeing from Spanish justice, Trinidad arrives in the Wild West along with her mother and her sister, eking out a living thanks to her skills with weapons while earning herself several foes, including the Bronson widow.

== Cast ==
- Gabriela Andrada as Trinidad
- Paz Vega as Claudia
- Karla Sofía Gascón as la viuda Bronson
- Sofía Allepuz as María
- Milena Smit
- Guillermo Bedward
- James Giblin
- Antonio Dechent
- Alfonso Sánchez

== Production ==
Shooting started in the Canary Islands on 28 April 2025. The film is an Inefable Productions (an ISII Group company) production. It had a reported budget north of €14 million.

== Release ==
Trinidad was programmed to screen in the S.O. Out of Competition – Cinema of the World section of the 57th International Film Festival of India (IFFI Goa) on 22 November 2026. The film was due for a theatrical release on 13 November 2026 by Deep Com Roots. The release date was later set for 4 December 2026. It will be made available on Divergente after the theatrical window.

== See also ==
- List of Spanish films of 2026
