= Megan Maxwell =

Spanish writer (born 1965)

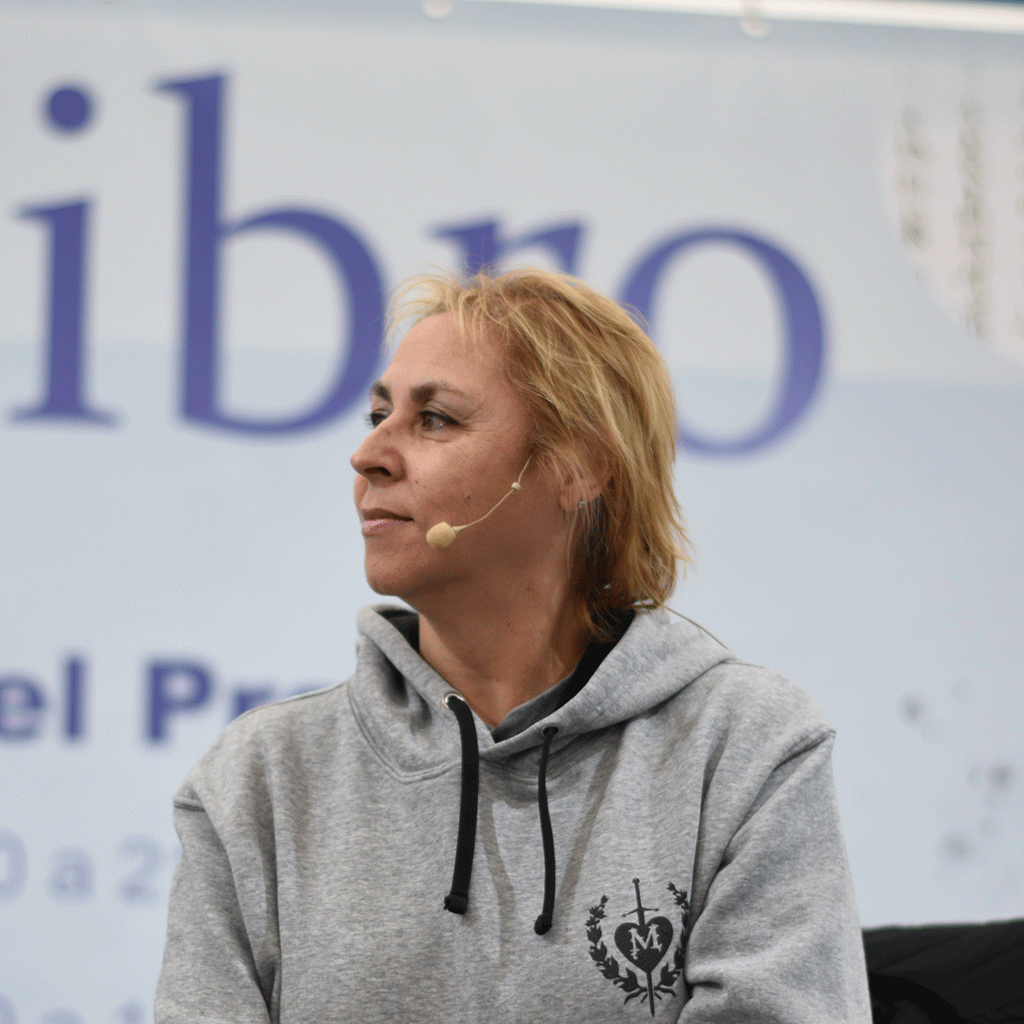
- Born: María del Carmen Rodríguez del Álamo Lázaro; 19 February 1965 (age 61); Nuremberg, Germany
- Occupation: Novelist
- Writing career
- Pen name: Megan Maxwell
- Period: 2009–present
- Genres: Chick lit, Romance, Erotica
- Notable work: Pídeme lo que quieras series
- Website: www.megan-maxwell.com

Megan Maxwell is the pseudonym of María del Carmen Rodríguez del Álamo Lázaro (born 1965 in Nuremberg, Germany), a Spanish romantic novelist whose works can be categorized as chick lit. She was born to a Spanish mother and an American father, who split up before she was born. Shortly after her birth, her mother brought her to Spain and raised her there with minimal paternal contact. Since 2009, she has written several novels.

Her novel Pídeme lo que quieras was made into a movie (Ask Me What You Want) in 2024.
