= Parot (TV series) =

Spanish police thriller television series

- Genre: Thriller; Police drama
- Created by: Pilar Nadal; Alonso Laporta; Luis Murillo Arias; Luis Murillo Moreno
- Directed by: Gustavo Ron; Rafael Montesinos
- Starring: Adriana Ugarte; Blanca Portillo; Iván Massagué
- Country of origin: Spain
- Original language: Spanish
- No. of seasons: 1
- No. of episodes: 10

Production
- Production companies: ViacomCBS International Studios; RTVE; Onza

Original release
- Network: Amazon Prime Video
- Release: 28 May 2021

Parot is a Spanish police thriller television series starring Adriana Ugarte, Blanca Portillo and Iván Massagué, among others. It was originally released on Amazon Prime Video on 28 May 2021, with a later free-to-air broadcasting date by RTVE yet to be disclosed.

== Premise ==
Set in 2013 in Spain, the fiction follows the serial killing of former inmates who have been early released after the annulment of the Parot doctrine reduced their terms of imprisonment. The investigation of the criminal case is assumed by agent Isabel Mora (Adriana Ugarte).

== Cast ==
- Adriana Ugarte as Isabel Mora.
- Blanca Portillo as Andrea Llanes.
- Iván Massagué as Haro.
- Patricia Vico as Ana Hurtado.
- Javier Albalá as Jorge Nieto.
- Antonio Dechent el comisario.
- Michel Brown as Plaza.
- Nicole Wallace as Sol.
- Marcos Marín as Abaño.
- Rodrigo Poison as Perea.
- Nacho Fresneda as Patas.
- Max Mariegues as Basauri.

== Production and release ==
Created by Pilar Nadal, Alonso Laporta, Luis Murillo Arias and Luis Murillo Moreno and directed by Gustavo Ron and Rafael Montesinos, the series was produced by ViacomCBS International Studios, RTVE and Onza. It consists of 10 episodes with a running time of around 45 minutes. Filming started by September 2020 in Madrid. On 25 March 2021, Amazon Prime Video reported the intended release date set for 28 May 2021. Paramount+ released the series in Latin American territories on 20 August 2021.

== Episodes ==
No.	Title	Directed by	Original release date
1	"La excarcelación"	Gustavo Ron	28 May 2021
2	"Otra vez juntos"	Gustavo Ron	28 May 2021
3	"Carnaval"	Rafa Montesinos	28 May 2021
4	"El Traslado"	Rafa Montesinos	28 May 2021
5	"Protestas"	Gustavo Ron	28 May 2021
6	"El zoo"	Rafa Montesinos	28 May 2021
7	"La entrevista"	Gustavo Ron	28 May 2021
8	"El hayedo"	Rafa Montesinos	28 May 2021
9	"Festival"	Gustavo Ron	28 May 2021
10	"Una foto contigo"	Rafa Montesinos	28 May 2021
