= One Year and One Day =

- Theatrical release poster
- Spanish: Un año y un día
- Directed by: Alejandro San Martín
- Written by: Alejandro San Martín
- Starring: Nicole Wallace; Lucho Fernández; Nadia de Santiago; Carlos Iglesias; Víctor Elías; Fanny Gautier; Antonio Gil; Paula Iglesias; Cosette Silguero
- Cinematography: Óscar Montesinos
- Edited by: Sebastián González; Jorge Arrieta
- Music by: Víctor Elías; Jaime Vaquero
- Production company: La Promesa Cinematográfica
- Distributed by: #ConUnPack
- Release dates: 17 March 2025 (Málaga); 21 March 2025 (Spain)
- Country: Spain
- Language: Spanish

One Year and One Day (Spanish: Un año y un día) is a 2025 Spanish romantic drama film written and directed by Alex San Martín in his full-length debut. It stars Luis Fernández, Nadia de Santiago, and Nicole Wallace.

== Plot ==
Broken by his breakup with Sara, Hugo tries to reunite with the love of his life no matter what it takes, and starts to take piano lessons from neighbor Nerea.

== Cast ==
- Luis Fernández as Hugo
- Nadia de Santiago as Sara
- Nicole Wallace as Nerea
- Carlos Iglesias
- Cossete Silguero
- Fanny Gautier
- Víctor Elías
- Antonio Gil
- Paula Iglesias

== Production ==
Víctor Elías and Jaime Vaquero composed the film score, while the songs were performed by Nicole Wallace.

== Release ==
The film was presented at the 28th Málaga Film Festival on 17 March 2025. #ConUnPack and A Contracorriente Films co-handled distribution. It is scheduled to be released theatrically in Spain on 21 March 2025.

== Reception ==
Paula Pardo Luz of Cinemanía rated the film 3½ out of 5 stars, billing it as "a feel-good movie in which you leave the theater happy and a little teary-eyed".

== See also ==
- List of Spanish films of 2025
