= Paraíso perdido =

- Directed by: Humberto Hinojosa Ozcariz
- Written by: Anton Goenechea
- Produced by: Humberto Hinojosa Ozcariz
- Starring: Ana Claudia Talancón; Iván Sánchez; Andrés Almeida; Raúl Briones
- Cinematography: Guillermo Garza Morales
- Edited by: Joaquin Martí
- Music by: Rodrigo Dávila
- Production company: Tigre Pictures
- Distributed by: Videocine
- Release date: 2016
- Running time: 87 minutes
- Country: Mexico
- Language: Spanish

Paraíso perdido (English Lost Paradise) is a 2016 Mexican thriller film directed by Humberto Hinojosa Ozcariz and starring Ana Claudia Talancón, Iván Sánchez, Andrés Almeida and Raúl Briones.

== Plot ==
Sofia, Mateo and Pedro are close friends that decide on a getaway to the exotic and beautiful islands of the Mexican Caribbean. They are unaware that the holiday may be their last.

== Cast ==
- Ana Claudia Talancón as Sofia
- Iván Sánchez as Mateo
- Andrés Almeida as Pedro
- Raúl Briones as El niño

== Crew ==
The movie was filmed in the island of Cozumel in Quintana Roo, Mexico
