= Ask Me What You Want =

- Theatrical release poster
- Spanish: Pídeme lo que quieras
- Directed by: Lucía Alemany
- Screenplay by: Ivy Hesh; Vivian Dakota; Marina Martín
- Based on: Pídeme lo que quieras by Megan Maxwell
- Produced by: Alejandro Miranda
- Starring: Gabriela Andrada; Mario Ermito
- Cinematography: Thais Català
- Edited by: Raúl de Torres
- Music by: Vanessa Garde
- Production companies: Versus Entertainment; Lyo Media; 4Cats; Warner Bros. Pictures
- Distributed by: Warner Bros. Pictures
- Release date: 29 November 2024
- Running time: 114 minutes
- Country: Spain
- Language: Spanish

Ask Me What You Want (Spanish: Pídeme lo que quieras) is a 2024 erotic romantic drama film directed by Lucía Alemany from a screenplay by Ivy Hesh, Marina Martín Laguna, and Vivian Dakota based on the novel by Megan Maxwell starring Gabriela Andrada and Mario Ermito.

== Plot ==
Judith aka Jud, is a woman in her 20s, who works at a corporate office in Madrid. She becomes attracted to her new boss, Eric, who has recently inherited the company. On their first date, Eric reveals to her his kinky side, scaring her. Jud cuts their date short, but later apologises. After she has blindfolded sex with Eric, she is shocked to learn that another woman was present in the room with them, and gave Jud oral sex without her consent. Jud leaves angrily, but runs into Eric the next day at the office.

Eric announces Jud will accompany him on a business trip to Barcelona. Despite establishing professional boundaries, the two have sex again in Barcelona, first in the office conference room and then at their hotel. Afterwards, Eric suddenly leaves and puts Jud on a plane to take her home the next day. Jud visits Jerez instead, intending to stay with her family. She hooks up with an ex-lover, Fernando. Eric shows up to apologize, and takes Jud on a road-trip to his friend, Frida’s house. Frida is the woman who gave Jud oral sex at Eric's apartment. That evening, Eric, Jud, Frida and Frida's husband, attend a swinger party together. Jud and Eric have a threesome with another man. The next morning, Eric has disappeared again.

Jud returns to Madrid alone. She gets promoted on her day back at the office. Eric returns, and they spend the night at Jud's apartment. The next day, Jud decides to explore her kinky side - she ties Eric at his bed and blindfolds him. Unknown to Eric, he ends up having sex with another woman, Betta, who turns out to be an ex-lover. Realising she has been deceived again, Jud starts crying.

At the beach, Jud strips off nude, revealing a tattoo below her waist that bears the film's name. She voices that she is free now and has complete control over her body.

== Cast ==
- Gabriela Andrada as Judith Flores
- Mario Ermito as Eric Zimmerman
- Paco Tous
- David Solans
- Celia Freijeiro as Monica, Judith's manager
- Alba Ribas as Frida, Eric's swinger friend
- Joel Bosqued
- Eva Barrul
- Alicia Bercán
- Lucas Fuica

== Production ==
In 2020, Megan Maxwell announced a collaboration agreement between Versus Entertainment and Warner Bros. Pictures to co-produce a film adaptation of her novel. Featuring an official budget north of €5.2 million, the film was produced by Versus Entertainment, Warner Bros. Entertainment España, Guerreras Maxwell, AIE, Lyo Media, and 4 Cats Pictures and it had the participation of RTVE and Max.

It was shot in Jerez de la Frontera and Madrid in 2024.

== Release ==
Ask Me What You Want was released theatrically in Spain on 29 November 2024 by Warner Bros. Pictures International España.

== Reception ==
Pablo Vázquez of Fotogramas rated the film 3 out of 5 stars, assessing that it is in Andrada's "delicate work" that the film "transcends canon and delivers more than expected".

== See also ==
- List of Spanish films of 2024
