= My Fault (film) =

2023 film directed by Domingo González

- Official release poster
- Spanish: Culpa mía
- Directed by: Domingo González
- Screenplay by: Domingo González
- Based on: Culpa mía by Mercedes Ron
- Produced by: Álex de la Iglesia; Carolina Bang
- Starring: Nicole Wallace; Gabriel Guevara
- Production company: Pokeepsie Films
- Distributed by: Amazon MGM Studios
- Release date: 8 June 2023
- Running time: 117 minutes
- Country: Spain
- Language: Spanish

My Fault (Spanish: Culpa mía) is a 2023 Spanish romantic drama film directed by Domingo González in his directorial feature length debut and starring Nicole Wallace and Gabriel Guevara.

The film is based on the Wattpad story of the same name by Mercedes Ron. There were two sequels to form a trilogy, Your Fault in 2024 and Our Fault in 2025.

My Fault premiered on June 8, 2023 on Amazon Prime. It became an instant hit, garnered lots of attention on TikTok, and was the most watched film on the platform of 2023.

== Plot ==
Seventeen-year-old Noah has to move into a wealthy new home after her mother Rafaella marries billionaire William Leister. Upset about being separated from her boyfriend Dan, she struggles to adjust to the change and immediately clashes with her new stepbrother, Nick Leister, and the family dog Thor. There is, however, obvious sexual tension when he teases her about her freckles, and when her friend Betty asks her on the phone if her stepbrother is hot, she does not deny it.

That evening, Noah is taken to the Leisters' country club for dinner. Although her closet is full of expensive new clothes, she opts for wearing an over-sized Ramones t-shirt. Noah notices a waitress attempt to seduce Nick and intent on picking an argument, she taunts him about being a trust fund baby. An irritated Nick excuses himself saying he has important work to do, but William asks his son to drop Noah off at home first, hoping they will bond.

On the way, Noah touches a nerve with the topic of mothers, so Nick forces her out of the car. Abandoned on the lonely road, she befriends a partygoer named Mario. Nick turns out to be the leader of the party, where Noah looks on in disgust as he makes out with multiple women. Noah calls Nick out on his pretense of being the perfect son, though he acts unbothered and makes strongly flirtatious remarks.

Noah meets Nick's old friend Jenna and they get along well. Nick acts rebellious by licking shots off Anna's chest, but his attention shifts to a party-crasher offering Noah a drink. Nick shifts into protective mode, ordering the man to leave and yelling that he is known for spiking drinks. Noah passes out then acts giddily drunk, amusing Nick. The next day, Nick is visibly jealous upon hearing Noah has a boyfriend in her previous hometown.

At a street rally, Noah receives upsetting images of her boyfriend Dan and her best friend Betty who she left behind. Nick offers to help her send her own make-out pictures with him. Their kiss visibly affects them, but Nick rushes away to hook up with Anna in the hope that his feelings will fade. Left alone in the car, Noah enjoys the feel of being in the driving seat, but Ronnie pulls up alongside her and assumes she is racing in Nick's place.

Goaded into competing, Noah surprises everyone with her racing skills and wins first place over Ronnie. Unable to deal with being beaten by a woman, Ronnie turns the tables by pretending he had no idea that Noah was his competitor and Nick's team automatically loses for getting her to drive instead. The rule in place is that Nick must forfeit 15,000 and his beloved car. Nick attacks Ronnie for verbally insulting Noah. She notices Nick has the same tattoo as her and they share a tender gaze, before Nick disappears for four days.

Nick misses a family gala to secretly visit his younger sister Maggie, who is diabetic. Noah bonds with Thor, and Nick develops a deeper connection with her as he insists the outcome of the race was unimportant. Unaware that he cheated on her daughter, Rafaella invites Dan to the mansion with the intention of cheering up Noah. She fears Dan will recognize Nick from the kissing photo and tell their parents, but Nick's jealousy of their past relationship causes him to be openly seductive around her, to the point where they are caught getting intimate by Dan. Realizing he is second best in her heart, Dan quietly leaves and honors Noah's plea to keep what he saw a secret. Meanwhile, Ronnie shows up threatening Noah, and Nick chivalrously takes a beating to protect her.

Noah receives an anonymous threatening message but hides it away. A love square emerges as Nick and Noah share a car ride with Anna and Mario to an underground arena. It is revealed that Noah had learned about car racing from her father Jonás, who she claims is dead. Nick is touched by Noah gifting him a toy Ferrari for his birthday and discloses his growing feelings for her. Upon discovering that Nick is the star attraction of a fight club, Noah grows fearful and the situation worsens when he pushes her friend Mario to the ground after seeing him kiss Noah. She ends things with Nick, blaming his violent ways without elaborating on who scared her in the past.

Several weeks have passed, showing Nick and Noah are reluctantly estranged. Noah continues to be harassed by an unknown person. Nick is casually seeing Anna again, but his priorities realign as William reveals to him that Noah's abusive father just got out of jail and is out for revenge. Jonás had beat Rafaella for years, but after he put a knife on Noah (creating her scar), she testified to put him away. She has not been told he is out, as Rafaella knows it would terrify her. Nick is consumed by guilt and now understands her defensive reaction at the arena.

Determined to win back her trust, Nick contacts Lion to ask if Noah is at his house party. She's having fun with Jenna but is drowning her sorrows over losing Nick. Noah's fear of the dark emerges as she is locked in a closet by an extremely jealous Anna, causing Noah to scream in fear of believing Jonás is there. A concerned Nick takes her home, where Noah asks him to sleep by her as she fears reliving nightmares of her father.

The next morning, William catches them looking cozy in bed together and realizes the nature of their relationship. Nick and Noah visit Maggie in hospital, and on the way home, Nick declares his love for Noah - insisting that their parents' disapproval should not stand in their way of being together. Noah is less certain of a happy future, but admits she feels the same way as him and they share a night of passion.

Their blissful time is cut short, as Jonás orders Ronnie to kidnap Noah and demands a ransom. Nick teams up with the police to find her, leading to a car chase that ends with Jonás being killed. Nick and Noah have an emotional reunion whereby they resolve to never let each other go, but Rafaella privately tells William she intends to destroy their romance.

== Cast ==
- Nicole Wallace as Noah Morán (Nick's stepsister and love interest)
- Gabriel Guevara as Nicholas “Nick” Leister (Noah's stepbrother and love interest)
- Marta Hazas as Rafaella Leister (Noah's mother)
- Iván Sánchez as William Leister (Nick's father)
- Eva Ruiz as Jenna (Noah's new best friend)
- Víctor Varona as Lion (Nick's best friend)
- Noah Casas as Maggie (Nick's sister)
- Fran Berenguer as Ronnie (Nick's racing rival)
- Iván Massagué as Jonás (Noah's father)
- Adriana Ubani as Anna (Nick's friend-with-benefits)
- Lucas Nabor as Mario (Noah's friend who harbors feelings for her)
- Pablo Riguero as Dan (Noah's boyfriend-turned-ex)
- Eve Ryan as Betty (Noah's longtime friend)

== Production ==
The film is based on the Wattpad story Culpa mía by Mercedes Ron, later expanded into a book trilogy published by Penguin Random House. It is a Pokeepsie Films (Álex de la Iglesia and Carolina Bang) production. Shooting locations in the Costa del Sol included Torremolinos, Manilva, and Marbella.

== Release ==
The film debuted on Amazon Prime Video on 8 June 2023. According to Amazon Prime Video, the film reportedly attained the best opening three-day viewership figures for any non-English local original in the history of the service.

== Reception ==
Lucas Hill-Paul of Daily Express rated the film 2 out of 5 stars, considering that it might be "Prime Video's trashiest venture yet, but it at least arrives with a self-aware wink and two likable leads". John Serba of Decider.com gave My Fault a negative review, deeming it to be "an atrocious movie", with the characters being otherwise "insipid and rudimentary".

My Fault became Amazon Prime Video's most popular film worldwide in 2023. The movie remained in the top 5 the following year in 2024 and became the #4 most popular movie on Prime in 2024.

== Sequels and remake ==
Prime Video green-lit the production of two sequels completing Mercedes Ron's book trilogy: Your Fault (released in December 2024) and Our Fault (released in October 2025). Both sequels feature Domingo González in direction duties.

An English-language remake, My Fault: London, directed by Dani Girdwood and Charlotte Fassler and starring Asha Banks and Matthew Broome, was released in February 2025.

== See also ==
- List of Spanish films of 2023
