= Gabriela Andrada =

Spanish actress

- Andrada in 2026
- Born: 1999 (age 26–27); Madrid, Spain
- Occupation: Actress

Gabriela Andrada (born 1999) is a Spanish actress. She is best known for her performance in the film Ask Me What You Want.

== Life and career ==
Born on 1999 in Madrid, Andrada is the daughter of presenter Minerva Piquero and economist Juan Mario Andrada. She earned a degree in Film and Audiovisual Arts from TAI. She suffered a traffic accident in October 2021, which broke her jaw and teeth and temporarily set back the beginning of her acting career.

She started her television career with appearances in series such as Sequía (2022), Los protegidos A.D.N. (2022) and Heirs to the Land (2022). In the second title, she portrayed Babi, a "competitive" character adversarial to protagonist Sandra. In the latter title she portrayed Dolça. Early film credits included appearances in Lost & Found and Sueños y pan. She landed her first leading film role in the erotic drama Ask Me What You Want (2024), portraying Judith Flores, a young woman from Jerez entering a twisted relationship with her boss. Also in 2024, she featured in Your Fault, the second installment of the saga Culpables. In 2025, she landed the titular role in the Western adventure film Trinidad, starring alongside Paz Vega and Karla Sofía Gascón.
