= IES Lope de Vega =

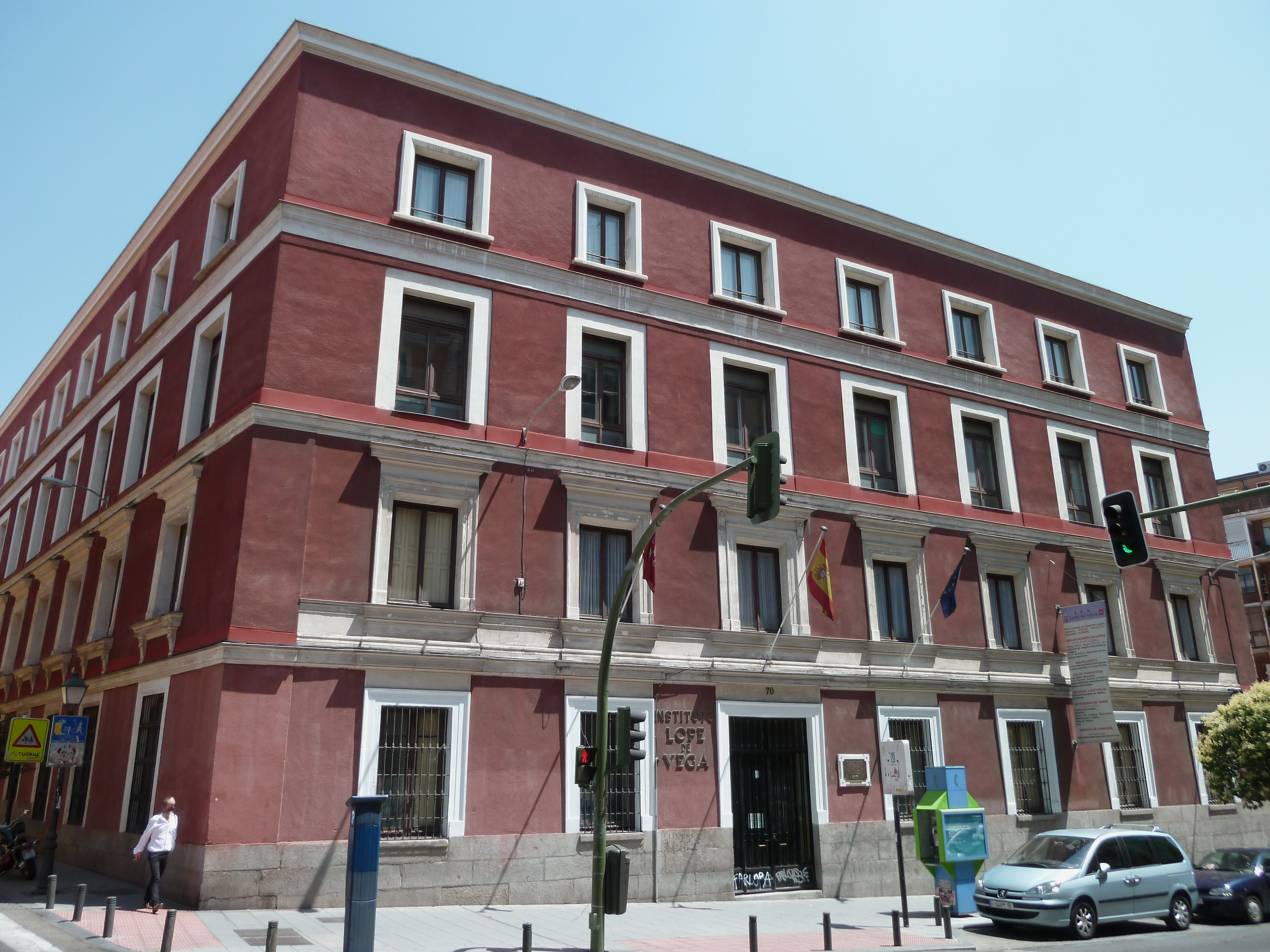

Address
- Calle de San Bernardo, 70, 28015, Madrid, Spain
- Coordinates: 40.426994°N 3.706384°W

Information
- Type: Public secondary school
- Established: 26 August 1933
- Grades: ESO, Bachillerato, ciclos formativos

Spanish Cultural Heritage
- Official name: Edificio del Instituto Lope de Vega
- Type: Non-movable
- Criteria: Monument
- Designated: 26 March 1999
- Reference no.: RI-51-0010461

The Instituto de Enseñanza Secundaria Lope de Vega (IES Lope de Vega) is a public high school in Madrid, Spain. It is located in the calle de San Bernardo. It is operated by the regional administration of the Community of Madrid.

== History ==
The institution was created during the Spanish Second Republic via a decree issued on 26 August 1933. although it was not yet housed at the corner of Calle de San Bernardo with Calle de Daoíz. It was one of the only 3 high schools that remained open in Madrid during the Civil War. The school featured a pro-rebel faculty, constituting a "Nationalist" stronghold in Republican Madrid for the extent of the conflict. It was the only secondary school of those created in the Spanish capital during the second republic which remained undisturbed after the war, as the rest were closed.

Originally housed at a palace in Calle de Manuel Silvela, the high school was briefly located in Calle de Fortuny, returning to Manuel Silvela during the conflict and then moving to its current premises in Calle de San Bernardo in the early 1940s.

The building in San Bernardo (that prior to the installment of the secondary school had housed a Normal school and the Pedagogical Museum) was declared Bien de Interés Cultural on 26 March 1999.

== Decorations ==
- Encomienda de número of the Order of the Dos de Mayo (2017)
