= Tomorrow Is Today =

- Promotional release poster
- Spanish: Mañana es hoy
- Directed by: Nacho G. Velilla
- Screenplay by: Oriol Capel; David Sánchez; Nacho G. Velilla
- Starring: Javier Gutiérrez; Carmen Machi; Asier Ricarte; Carla Díaz
- Cinematography: Ángel Amorós
- Music by: Juanjo Javierre
- Production companies: Atresmedia Cine; Aparte Films
- Distributed by: Amazon Studios
- Release date: 2 December 2022
- Country: Spain
- Language: Spanish

Tomorrow Is Today (Spanish: Mañana es hoy) is a 2022 Spanish comedy film directed by Nacho G. Velilla which stars Javier Gutiérrez, Carmen Machi, Asier Ricarte and Carla Díaz.

== Plot ==
During their 1991 summer holidays, José Luis Gaspar takes his wife Pilar and their two teenagers, Lucia and Rodrigo, to the beach. Lucia gets in an argument with her family and leaves with her boyfriend Charly to attend a carnival, much to Jose's chagrin. The rest of them go out to sea in a paddle boat and, during a sudden thunderstorm, are transported in time to 2022.

In the future, they go back to their old neighborhood and manage to find Rodrigo's best friend and Jose's employee Quique, now a middle-aged man. He explains to them that Lucia died at the carnival in 1991, and the family surmises that Charly killed her. Jose finds a local fortune teller Ana Clara, along with her cousin/assistant Elvirita, to somehow bring his daughter back - Ana Clara received Lucia's personalized bracelet from Jose in 1991, so the three of them believe they can figure out how. Pilar and Rodrigo, meanwhile, try to adapt to life in the future, with Pilar getting a job at a fashion boutique and Rodrigo getting his first girlfriend by resuming life as a high schooler with Quique's help.

At a bar, Jose and Ana Clara spot an aged Charly advertising his family's condo for sale, and confront him at an open house to try to get a murder confession out of him. Charly runs away and is hit by a random car, which Pilar witnesses. When they have a family dinner with Quique at his condo that night, Pilar berates Jose for getting a man killed. Jose makes another desperate attempt at traveling back to 1991, by paddling out to another thunderstorm in a nearly-identical paddle boat, and Pilar and Rodrigo get into the boat with him at the last minute. Jose's plan actually works, and they find Lucia back at the beach in 1991 thinking only an hour or two has gone by.

Jose and Pilar try to prevent Lucia by going to the fateful carnival, first by throwing her a grand birthday party, then by trying to explain to her that they traveled into the future. She believes they are lying and angrily leaves with Charly. Jose, Pilar, Rodrigo and Quique then rush to the carnival to try to rescue her. At the carnival, Lucia and Charly meet a teenaged Ana Clara and Elvirita, and are about to get on a Ferris wheel before Lucia discovers a smart phone from 2022 in her jacket, with footage of her gravestone on it. She then runs away from Charly and finds Quique, and they get on the Ferris wheel together instead to figure out an escape plan. Lucia rejects a kiss from Quique, and in a jealous rage, Quique tries to sexually assault Lucia. Jose spots teenaged Ana Clara and shows her the bracelet, and with actual clairvoyant powers, she points them to the Ferris wheel. Jose climbs up the Ferris wheel to try to rescue Lucia from Quique, but falls off the carriage to his death.

In 2022, aged versions of Pilar, Rodrigo, Lucia, Charly (who has married Lucia with Pilar's blessing), Lucia and Charly's adolescent daughter, Ana Clara and Elvirita go up to the beach ahead of a thunderstorm, and paddle out to the storm in their next of many attempts to bring Jose back.

== Cast ==
- Javier Gutiérrez as José Luis Gaspar
- Carmen Machi as Pilar Gaspar
- Asier Ricarte as Rodrigo Gaspar
- Carla Díaz as Lucía Gaspar
- Gabriel Guevara as Young Charly
- Antonio Pagudo as Charly
- Pepón Nieto as Quique
- Antonia San Juan as Elvirita
- Silvia Abril as Ana Clara
- Mina El Hammani as Andrea
- Aixa Villagrán as Eva
- Marta Fernández Muro as Fina

== Production ==
The film is an Atresmedia Cine and Aparte Films Production for Amazon Prime Video. Shooting locations included Guadalajara and Móstoles.

== Release ==
The film premiered on Amazon Prime Video on 2 December 2022.

== Reception ==
Manuel J. Lombardo of Diario de Sevilla rated the film with a single star, considering that "little works" in the film, writing about "a lazy script development that throws overboard the many possibilities of collision between elements and sensibilities".

Sergio F. Pinilla of Cinemanía rated the film 4 out of 5 stars, assessing that in addition to its "excellent" score, the film stands out for "the parodic and witty [character] of its narrative and mise-en-scène".

Raquel Hernández Luján of HobbyConsolas rated the film with 62 points ('acceptable'), highlighting the starting premise and the casting as the best things about the film while citing the most dramatic part spoiling the fun and the final act as the worst things about it.

== See also ==
- List of Spanish films of 2022
