= Mercedes Ron =

Argentine-Spanish author (born 1993)

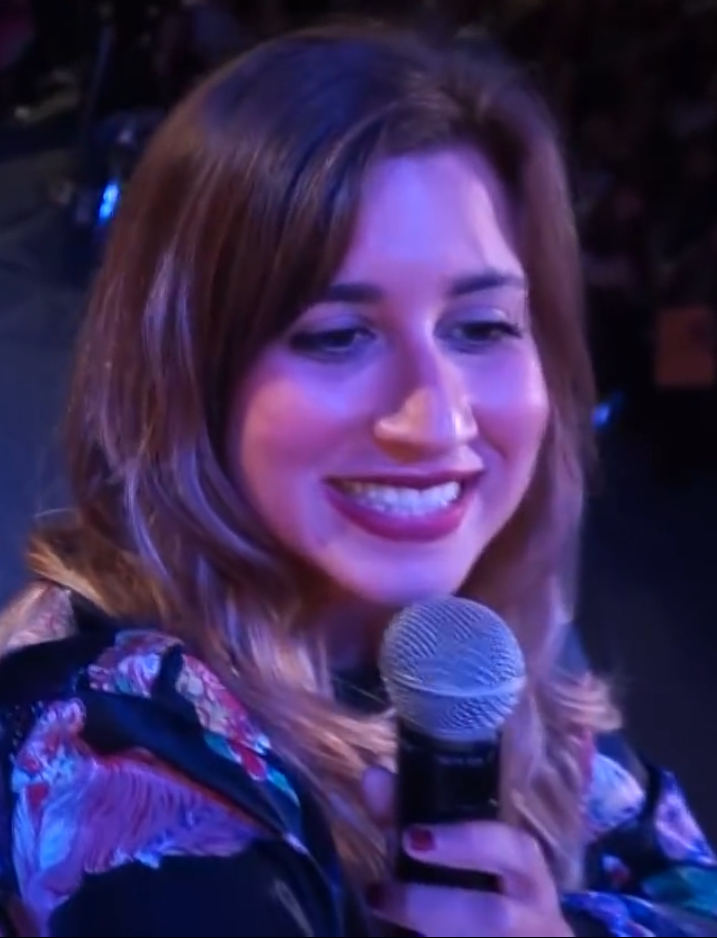
- Ron in 2018
- Born: 1 June 1993 (age 33); Buenos Aires, Argentina
- Education: University of Seville
- Occupation: Author
- Writing career
- Years active: 2014–present
- Genre: Young adult
- Notable awards: Wattys 2016
- Website: www.wattpad.com/MercedesRonn

Mercedes Ron López (born 1 June 1993) is an Argentine-born Spanish author. She is known for the Culpables Saga, a trilogy that became known through Wattpad. The first book of the trilogy, Culpa Mía, was adapted into a movie in 2023. The sequel, Culpa Tuya, was adapted into a movie and released on 27 December 2024. The third and final instalment, Culpa Nuestra, was released in 2025.

An English remake titled My Fault: London was released on Amazon Prime Video on 13 February 2025.

She currently resides in Seville, Spain.

== Early life and education ==
Ron was born in Buenos Aires, Argentina. She fled to Spain with her family in 2001 to avoid the riots in Argentina. She earned a degree in Audiovisual Communication at the University of Seville.

== Writing career ==
She began writing mainly on the Wattpad platform in mid-2015, where she started writing Culpa Mía. In 2016, she won a Wattys Awards badge. In March 2017, her novel Culpa Mía went on sale under the Montena seal of Penguin Random House in Barcelona. A few months later, her second book Culpa Tuya was released. In July 2018, the third and final book of the Guilty Trilogy, Culpa Nuestra, came out and was presented at the 23rd International Book Fair exhibition in Lima, Peru. The Guilty Trilogy was translated into French by publisher Hachette Romans in 2018.

In 2019, she premiered Marfíl, and in October Ébano.

As of 2025, she has over 321,000 followers on Wattpad. The author has over 100 million reads on Wattpad. She is a New York Times best-selling author, with more than three million copies sold worldwide. On June 26, 2026, she had signed a deal with Amazon MGM Studios to adapt literature work into television and film.

=== Novels ===
- Culpables Quartet
  - Culpa Mía (January 2017)
  - Culpa Tuya (September 2017)
  - Culpa Nuestra (January 2018)
  - Culpa Vuestra (May 2026)
- Enfrentados Duology
  - Marfíl (January 2019)
  - Ébano (January 2019)
- Dímelo Trilogy
  - Dímelo Bajito (October 2020)
  - Dímelo En Secreto (November 2020)
  - Dímelo Con Besos (April 2021)
- Bali Saga
  - 30 sunsets para enamorarte (May 2023)
  - 10.000 millas para encontrarte (September 2023)

== Awards ==
Mercedes Ron won the TikTok Book Award 2025 for the "Culpa Mía" series at the Frankfurt Book Fair.

== See also ==
- Argentine literature
