= Iván Sánchez =

Spanish actor, model, and filmmaker

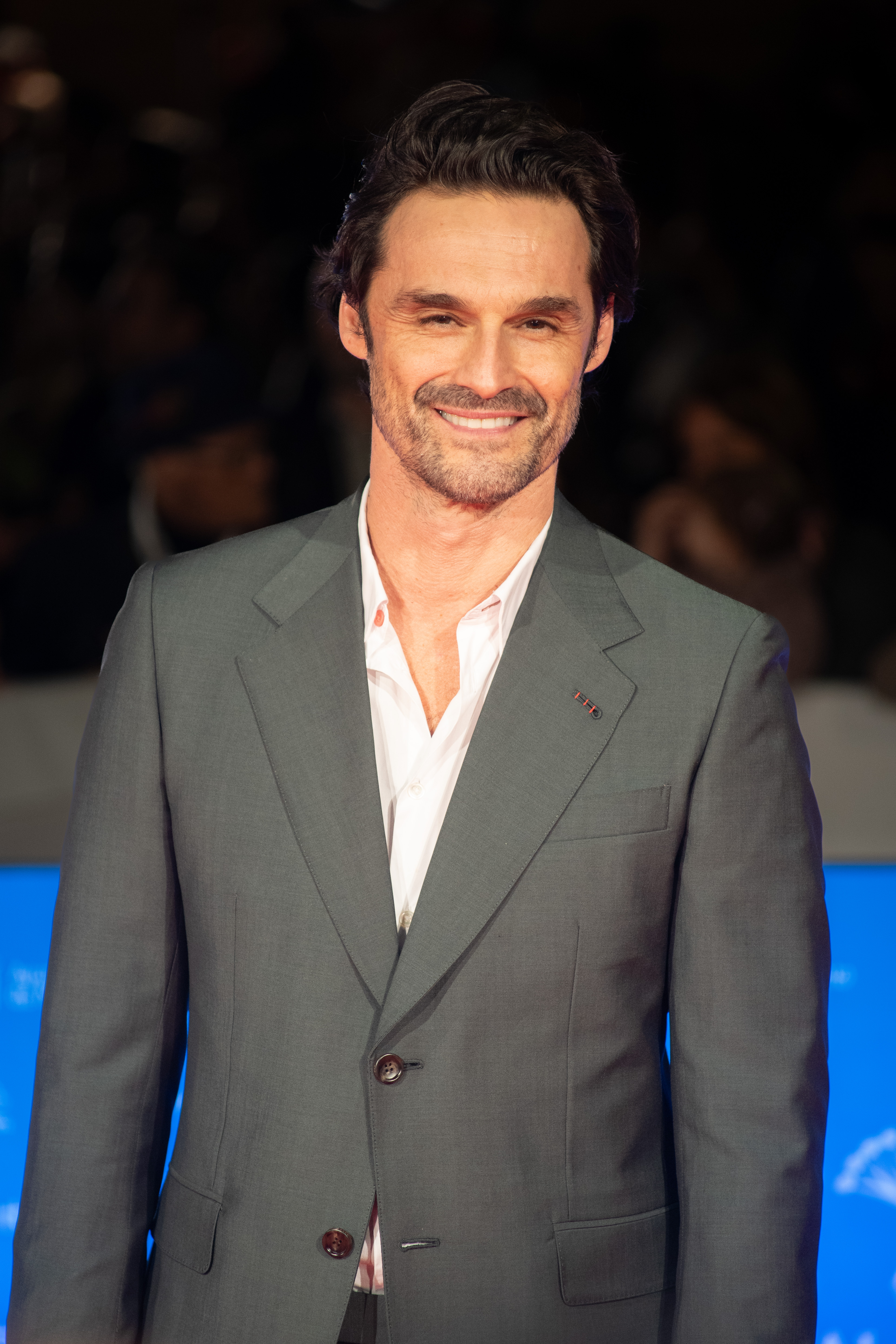
- Sánchez in 2024
- Born: Iván Sánchez; November 19, 1974 (age 51); Madrid, Spain
- Occupations: Actor; model; film producer
- Years active: 2002–present
- Children: 2

Iván Sánchez (born November 19, 1974) is a Spanish actor, model and film producer.

== Life and career ==
Sánchez was born in Madrid on November 19, 1974.

After his time as a model, Sánchez started acting in 2002 in his home country doing cinema, television, and theater. His first starring role was in the 2005 television series, El auténtico Rodrigo Leal as Rodrigo Leal. That series was a satire of Big Brother and similar reality shows. His big break came a year later when he was offered the role of Dr. Raul Lara in the series Hospital Central. Sánchez also acted in movies including Besos de gato (2003).

In March 2011, Sánchez left Hospital Central to join La Reina del Sur and later for the second season of Hispania, la leyenda.

In 2013, he starred as the antagonist opposite William Levy and Ximena Navarrete in Televisa's La tempestad. This was his first telenovela in Mexico. A year later, he appeared as a special guest on the second season of the series Crossing Lines where he played the reporter Mateo Cruz.

In 2015, Sánchez acted in Señorita Polvora. He landed another protagonist telenovela role in, Lo imperdonable beating out Jencarlos Canela for the role. He acted opposite Ana Brenda Contreras.

== Personal life ==
Starting in 2005, Sánchez was in a longtime relationship with his Hospital General co-star Elia Galera. They had two daughters, before ending their relationship in 2011. They reconciled in 2013 and married in 2014. It was revealed in 2016 that he and Galera had separated again.

== Filmography ==
=== Films ===
| Year | Title | Role | Notes |
|---|---|---|---|
| 2003 | Besos de gato | Camarero After | |
| 2006 | El efecto Rubik (& el poder del color rojo) | Unknown role | Short film |
| 2008 | Enloquecidas | David | |
| 2009 | Paco | Paco 6 | Short film |
| 2009 | Cíclope | Erick | Short film |
| 2011 | Edificio Ural | Jorge | Short film |
| 2015 | A la mala | Ex-Kika | |
| 2016 | Paraíso perdido | Mateo | |
| 2016 | Backseat Fighter | Mark | Film producer |
| 2018 | Asesinato en la universidad | Juan Soto Mesa | |
| 2018 | Dibujando el cielo | Raúl | |
| 2023 | My Fault | William Leister | |

=== Television ===
| Year | Title | Role | Notes |
|---|---|---|---|
| 2002 | Periodistas | Unknown role | "Periodistas" (Season 9, Episode 13) |
| 2002–03 | Javier ya no vive solo | Unknown role | "Hechizos de amor" (Season 1, Episode 12); "Que no se entere Javier" (Season 2, Episode 1); "Fantasmas" (Season 2, Episode 2) |
| 2003 | London Street | Doctor | Episode: "La boda" |
| 2003 | El pantano | Camarero | "Misterios" (Season 1, Episode 3); "El diario de Alicia" (Season 1, Episode 4); "Bajo sospecha" (Season 1, Episode 5); "La búsqueda" (Season 1, Episode 8) |
| 2003 | 7 vidas | Raúl Jiménez | "Caray, cómo está el servicio" (Season 6, Episode 10) |
| 2003 | El comisario | Dani | "Ladrones de cuerpos" (Season 6, Episode 3); "Diógenes y la estatua" (Season 6, Episode 5); "Los ojos de la zorra" (Season 6, Episode 11); "Morder el polvo" (Season 6, Episode 13) |
| 2003 | Aquí no hay quien viva | Fran | "Érase un niño" (Season 1, Episode 5) |
| 2003 | Un paso adelante | Unknown role | "¿Y la novia quién es?" (Season 4, Episode 15) |
| 2004 | La sopa boba | Javier | 11 episodes |
| 2004 | De moda | Unknown role | "Marta toca fondo" (Season 1, Episode 8) |
| 2005 | El auténtico Rodrigo Leal | Rodrigo Leal | 12 episodes |
| 2006 | Con dos tacones | Eduardo | 11 episodes |
| 2006–11 | Hospital Central | Dr. Raúl Lara | 123 episodes |
| 2011 | La Reina del Sur | Santiago López Fisterra "El Gallego" | 26 episodes |
| 2011–12 | Hispania, la leyenda | Fabio | 11 episodes |
| 2012 | Imperium | Fabio | "Sulpicio" (Season 1, Episode 1); "Hijos" (Season 1, Episode 4) |
| 2012 | Way Out | John | Television film |
| 2013 | La Tempestad | Hernán Saldaña | Main cast |
| 2014 | Crossing Lines | Mateo Cruz | "The Long Way Home" (Season 2, Episode 10) |
| 2015 | Señorita Pólvora | Miguel Galindo "M8" | Main role |
| 2015 | Lo imperdonable | Martín San Telmo | Main role |
| 2016 | Yago | Yago Vila / Omar | Main role |
| 2019 | You Cannot Hide | Alex | Main role; 10 Episodes |
| 2024 | La mujer de mi vida | Ricardo Orible/Pablo Silva | Main role |
| 2026 | Doc | Dr. Marco Santamaría | |
