= Iván Massagué =

Spanish actor

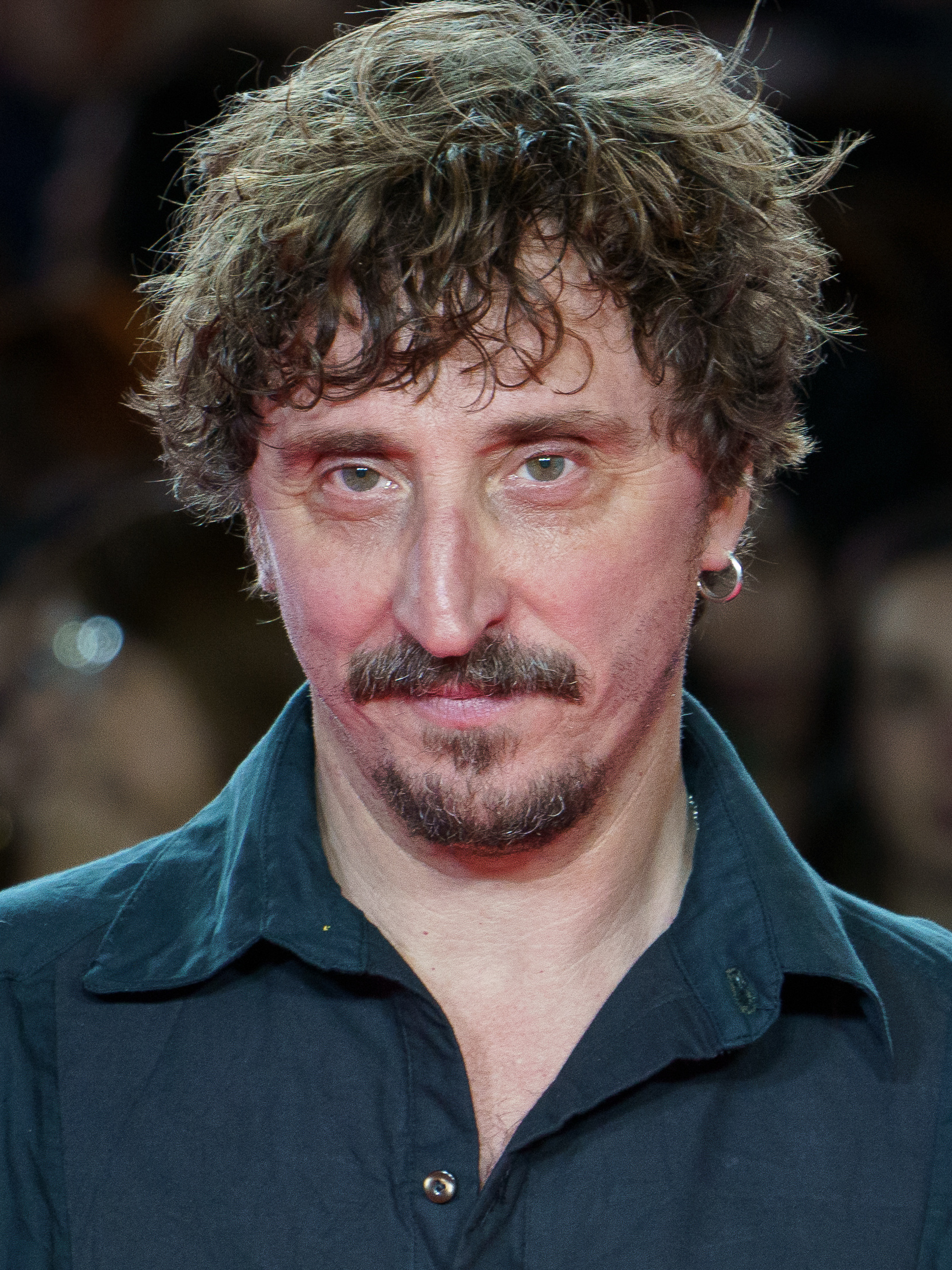
- Massagué in 2025
- Born: Iván Massagué Horta; 4 September 1976 (age 49); Barcelona, Catalonia, Spain
- Occupation: Actor
- Years active: 2000–present

Iván Massagué Horta (born 4 September 1976) is a Spanish actor.

== Biography ==
Massagué studied at the Nancy Tuñón school of theatre in Barcelona. Although he had been working for some years as an actor, his interpretation of Johnny in the last part of the TV series called Siete Vidas (Seven Lives) earned him the most accreditation. He would later star as Marco in La Familia Mata (The Family Kills) and as Burbuja in the TV series El barco.

Massagué also starred in the Spanish family comedy film Pancho, el perro millonario. Released on 6 June 2014. In the same year, he starred in La mujer de negro (The Woman in Black), directed by Emilio Gutierrez Caba.

After the ending of the TV series El Barco, Massagué was cast as the main character of a new sitcom on Cuatro called Gym Tony, starring alongside Antonia San Juan and Usun Yoon, amongst others.

He appeared in the third season of MasterChef Celebrity, in which he became the fourth contestant to be eliminated.

== Filmography ==
=== Movies ===
Year	title	Character	Director
2001	Només per tu	Cambrer 1	Jordi Cadena
2002	Mi casa es tu casa	Nacho	Miguel Álvarez
2002	Peor impossible, ¿qué puede fallar?	Pedro	David Blanco / José Semprún
2003	Nudos	Antonio	Lluís María Guëll
2003	Soldados de Salamina	Quim Figueras (20 años)	David Trueba
2003	Las maletas de Tulse Luper	Luper (joven)	Peter Greenaway
2004	XXL	Laski	Julio Sánchez Valdés
2004	Entre vivir y soñar	Félix (joven)	Alfonso Albacete / David Menkes
2006	El laberinto del fauno	El Tarta	Guillermo del Toro
2006	Tu vida en 65'	Albert Castillo	María Ripoll
2007	Presumptes implicats	Berni	Enric Folch
2007	Déjate caer	Grabi	Jesús Ponce
2013	Los últimos días	Lucas	David Pastor / Álex Pastor
2014	Kamikaze	Camilo	Álex Pina
2014	Pancho, el perro millonario	Alberto	Tom Fernández
2016	Cerca de tu casa	Dani	Eduard Cortés
2018	El año de la plaga	Victor Negro	C. Martín Ferrera
2019	The Platform (El Hoyo)	Goreng	Galder Gaztelu-Urrutia
2022	Bardo, False Chronicle of a Handful of Truths	Hernán Cortés	Alejandro G. Iñárritu
2023	Culpa mía	Jonás	Domingo González
2024	The Platform 2 (El Hoyo 2)	Goreng	Galder Gaztelu-Urrutia
2025	Esmorza amb mi (Join Me for Breakfast)	Salva	

=== TV ===
Year	Channel	Title	Character	Notes
2000	TVE	Estudio 1	Mensajero local	Local messenger (1 episode)
2000	Telecinco	El grupo	Fidel's friend	Local messenger (6 episodes)
2001	Telecinco	El Comisario	Drug Dealer	Local messenger (1 episode)
2001	Antena 3	Policías, en el corazón de la calle	Capi	Local messenger (1 episode)
2002	Telecinco	Hospital Central	Adrián	Episodic character (4 episodes)
2002	Telecinco	Periodistas	?	Episodic character (1 episode)
2002–2005	TV3	El cor de la ciutat	Gus Cerqueda	Cast character(23 episodes)
2005–2006	Telecinco	7 vidas	Johnny	Cast character (9 episodes)
2007	TV3	La vía Augusta	Aaró	Episodic character (4 episodes)
2007–2009	Antena 3	La familia Mata	Marcos Mata	Cast character (36 episodes)
2010	Cuatro	La isla de los nominados	Juanjo	Cast character(11 episodes)
2010	Antena 3	Impares	Maxi	Cast character (6 episodes)
2010–2011	Neox	Impares Premium	Maxi	Cast character (10 episodes)
2011	TVE	Los misterios de Laura	Hermano Jacinto	Cast character (1 episode)
2011–2013	Antena 3	El barco	Roberto Schneider (Burbuja)	Cast character (43 episodes)
2012	?	Entre líneas	Metralleta	?
2014–?	Cuatro	Gym Tony	Antonio Rovirosa "Tony"	Main character (¿? episodios)
2021	Amazon Prime Video	Parot	Haro	

=== Short films ===
Year	Title	Character	Director
2004	Ekaiz (Tormenta)	?	Jordi Cussó
2007	Gallos	?	Maurici Jiménez
2012	Nada que decir	Ramón	Darío Paso
2012	Paramar	Marcelo	Pablo Fernández

=== Theatre ===
Year	Title	Director
1997	El médico a palos	?
1998	El aniversario	?
1999	Ay Caray	?
?	Estudio después de la lluvia	Sergi Bellbel
2000	La chilena	?
2000	Bus 59	
2005	Algo	Alex Mañas
2007	True West	David Selvas
2009	Hamlet	Oriol Boggi
2014	La mujer de negro	Emilio Gutierrez Caba

=== Awards ===
Year	Title	Category
2013	OMGAward	Best Actor
