= Piggy (2022 film) =

2022 film by Carlota Pereda

- Theatrical release poster
- Spanish: Cerdita
- Directed by: Carlota Pereda
- Screenplay by: Carlota Pereda
- Based on: Piggy (short film) by Carlota Pereda
- Produced by: Merry Colomer
- Starring: Laura Galán; Richard Holmes; Carmen Machi; Irene Ferreiro; Camille Aguilar; Claudia Salas; Pilar Castro
- Cinematography: Rita Noriega
- Edited by: David Pelegrín
- Music by: Olivier Arson
- Production companies: Morena Films; Backup Studio; Cerdita AIE; La Banque Postale; Indéfilms
- Distributed by: Filmax (Spain); Backup Films (France)
- Release dates: 24 January 2022 (Sundance); 14 October 2022 (Spain); 2 November 2022 (France)
- Running time: 100 minutes
- Countries: Spain; France
- Language: Spanish
- Budget: €2.5 million
- Box office: $409,224

Piggy (Spanish: Cerdita) is a 2022 horror thriller film written and directed by Carlota Pereda, based on her 2019 short film of the same name. The cast, led by Laura Galán (who reprises her role from the short film), also features Richard Holmes, Carmen Machi, Claudia Salas, Irene Ferreiro, Camille Aguilar and Pilar Castro.

Piggy premiered at the Sundance Film Festival on 24 January 2022, before its theatrical release in Spain (14 October 2022) and France (2 November 2022). It earned six nominations to the 37th Goya Awards, winning Best New Actress (Galán).

== Plot ==
Sara is a fat teenage girl living in a small town in Extremadura. She is bullied by other teenage girls Maca and her friends Roci and Claudia, who call her Cerdita. (Note: Spanish: diminutive of cerda ('Female pig')) During the summer, Sara decides to visit the local swimming pool, only to be discovered by the bullies, who attack her and steal her backpack and clothes. Trudging home in her bathing suit, she is harassed by a group of men who chase her. She escapes onto a side road, where she sees a parked van which, initially unbeknownst to her, an unnamed man has used to kidnap her bullies. Claudia appears through the window, begging Sara to save her, but Sara is frozen with fear. Sara locks eyes with the kidnapper, who silently leaves a towel before driving off. Sara returns home, deciding not to tell anyone about what happened.

News reaches town that the pool's lifeguard has been found dead, and the waitress has gone missing, along with the three girls. Sara is questioned by both her mother Asun and the local Civil Guard. Sara denies that she was at the pool that afternoon. She realises she can track her mobile phone (which was in the backpack the girls had stolen) to determine the whereabouts of the girls. She steals her father's phone and ventures into the forest, where she locates her backpack and phone. Again she encounters the kidnapper, who warns her to be quiet and displays affection toward her before escaping. Family members of the missing girls, including Claudia's mother Elena, undertake their own investigation in the forest, during which they find the body of the missing waitress.

Pedro, a friend of the missing girls, introduces Sara to marijuana and reveals that he knows she was lying about not being at the pool. The townspeople suspect he is responsible for the girls' disappearance, and Sara promises to disclose what she saw if he is arrested. A hysterical Elena attacks Sara before Pedro reveals her truth to the crowd. The Civil Guard takes Sara for questioning. She succumbs to their pressure and begins to tell them information, but the sudden onset of her period prevents further interrogation.

Unbeknownst to Sara and Asun, the kidnapper has come to their home and attacked Sara's father. Sara and Asun have a heated argument, during which the kidnapper incapacitates Asun and takes Sara to an abandoned warehouse. There, Sara discovers Roci and Claudia, who are still alive but have been gagged and are hanging by their wrists. She attempts to untie them, but the kidnapper returns before she can complete the task. She discovers Maca's decomposing body and is found by the kidnapper, who embraces her. He encourages her to kill the two girls with his knife, but she attacks him instead. He accidentally fires his shotgun, blowing off Claudia's hand. Sara grapples with the kidnapper and kills him after biting a chunk out of his neck. She grabs the shotgun and contemplates killing her former bullies, but instead shoots the ropes suspending them and leaves. As Sara walks along a road, she encounters Pedro on a motorbike and rides with him back to town.

== Cast ==
- Laura Galán as Sara
- Richard Holmes as El desconocido
- Carmen Machi as Asun
- Claudia Salas as Maca
- Irene Ferreiro as Claudia
- Camille Aguilar as Roci
- José Pastor as Pedro
- Pilar Castro as Elena
- Julián Valcárcel as Tomás
- Fernando Delgado-Hierro as Juancarlitos
- Chema del Barco as Juan Carlos
- Stéphanie Magnin Vella as Rosa
- Lía Lois as Amaya
- Fred Tatien as Padre Roci
- José Vicente Moirón as Pedro

== Production ==
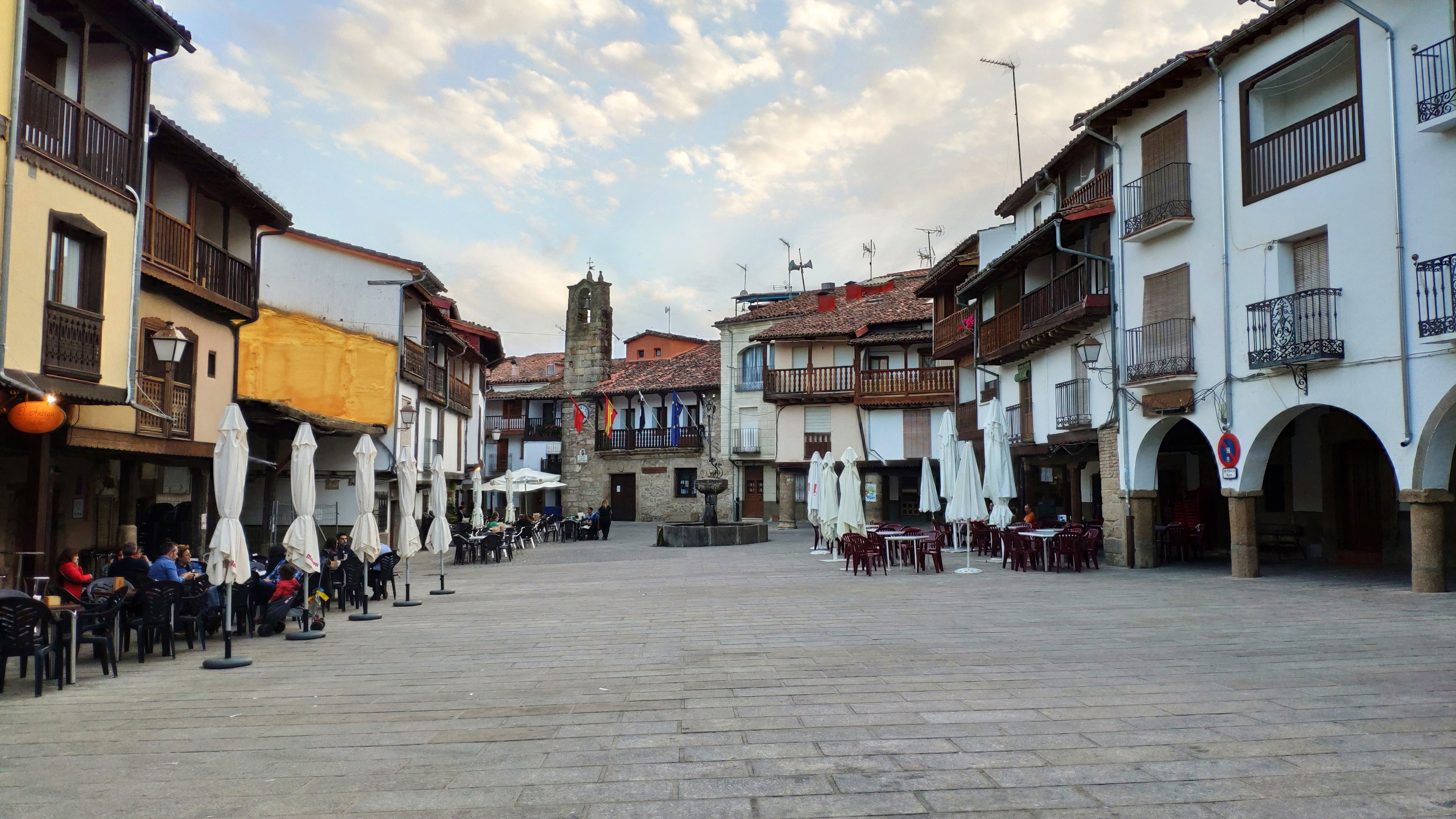
Villanueva de la Vera (in northeastern Extremadura) was the main shooting location.

Piggy, Carlota Pereda's feature film debut, is based on Pereda's short film of the same name, which won the Goya Award and the Forqué Award for Best Short Film in 2019 and stars Laura Galán, Paco Hidalgo, Elisabet Casanovas, Sara Barroso, Mireia Vilapuig and Jorge Elorza.

The feature film saw the return of the short film's lead actress (Laura Galán), and it was completed by Richard Holmes, Carmen Machi, Claudia Salas, Irene Ferreiro, Camille Aguilar, José Pastor, Pilar Castro and Chema del Barco. Rita Noriega took over cinematography duties.

A Spain–France co-production boasting a €2.5 million budget, the film was produced by Morena Films alongside Backup Studio and Cerdita AIE in association with La Banque Postale and Indéfilms, with the participation of RTVE and Movistar+, and support from the Junta de Extremadura, Eurimages, the Creative Europe's MEDIA sub-programme and the Madrid's regional administration. The white colored C15 van, a staple of rural Spain, prominently features in the film.

Filming began on 17 June 2021 and wrapped in late July. Shooting locations included the village of Villanueva de la Vera (Extremadura) and its surroundings.

== Release ==
Piggy had its world premiere at the Sundance Film Festival on 24 January 2022. It had its UK premiere at the FrightFest on 29 August 2022. It was presented in the 'Tabakalera-Zabaltegui' section of the 70th San Sebastián International Film Festival in September 2022. Distributed by Filmax, it was theatrically released in Spain on 14 October 2022. Likewise, the film, distributed by Backup Media, was set for a 19 October 2022 release in French cinemas, later rescheduled to 2 November 2022.

Magnet Releasing acquired North American rights, whereas Vertigo Releasing did so for the United Kingdom and Ireland. Other distribution deals include those with Alamode (Germany), Praesens (Switzerland), I Wonder (Italy), Nonstop Entertainment (Scandinavia and Baltics) and ADS Service (Hungary). Predated by a sneak pre-screening on 4 October 2022, the film received a limited release in the United States in Alamo Drafthouse theatres on 7 October 2022, followed by a wider release elsewhere in the US a week later.

== Reception ==
On the review aggregator website Rotten Tomatoes, 91% of 100 critics' reviews are positive, with an average rating of 7.30/10. The website's consensus reads: "Brought hauntingly to life by Laura Galán's committed performance, Piggy deftly deploys genre thrills in service of sharp social commentary."

Jonathan Holland of Screen Daily wrote that the film "smartly mashes up thriller, rural drama and comedy elements into a lovingly-crafted, potently atmospheric, and thought-provoking whole — with bucketsful of horrible blood thrown in for good measure", and praised the "terrific" character work. Guy Lodge of Variety determined the film "sits at an unexpected intersection of artistic sensibilities, first recalling Catherine Breillat, then Brian De Palma, before taking a deep, bloody plunge into grindhouse territory toward its unsettling, ambiguous finale", comparing Sara's journey to the protagonist of Carrie. David Rooney of The Hollywood Reporter presented the film as a "disturbing psychological drama" spiraling "into blood-drenched horror", considering that while Machi's performance is terrific, Galán's "riveting" performance is the one carrying the film.

=== Top ten lists ===
The film appeared on a number of critics' top ten lists of the best Spanish films of 2022:

- 3rd — Cadena SER (Elio Castro)
- 7th — El Periódico de Catalunya (critics)
- 10th — Cadena SER ('El cine en la SER' critics)
- 10th — El Mundo (Luis Martínez)

== Accolades ==
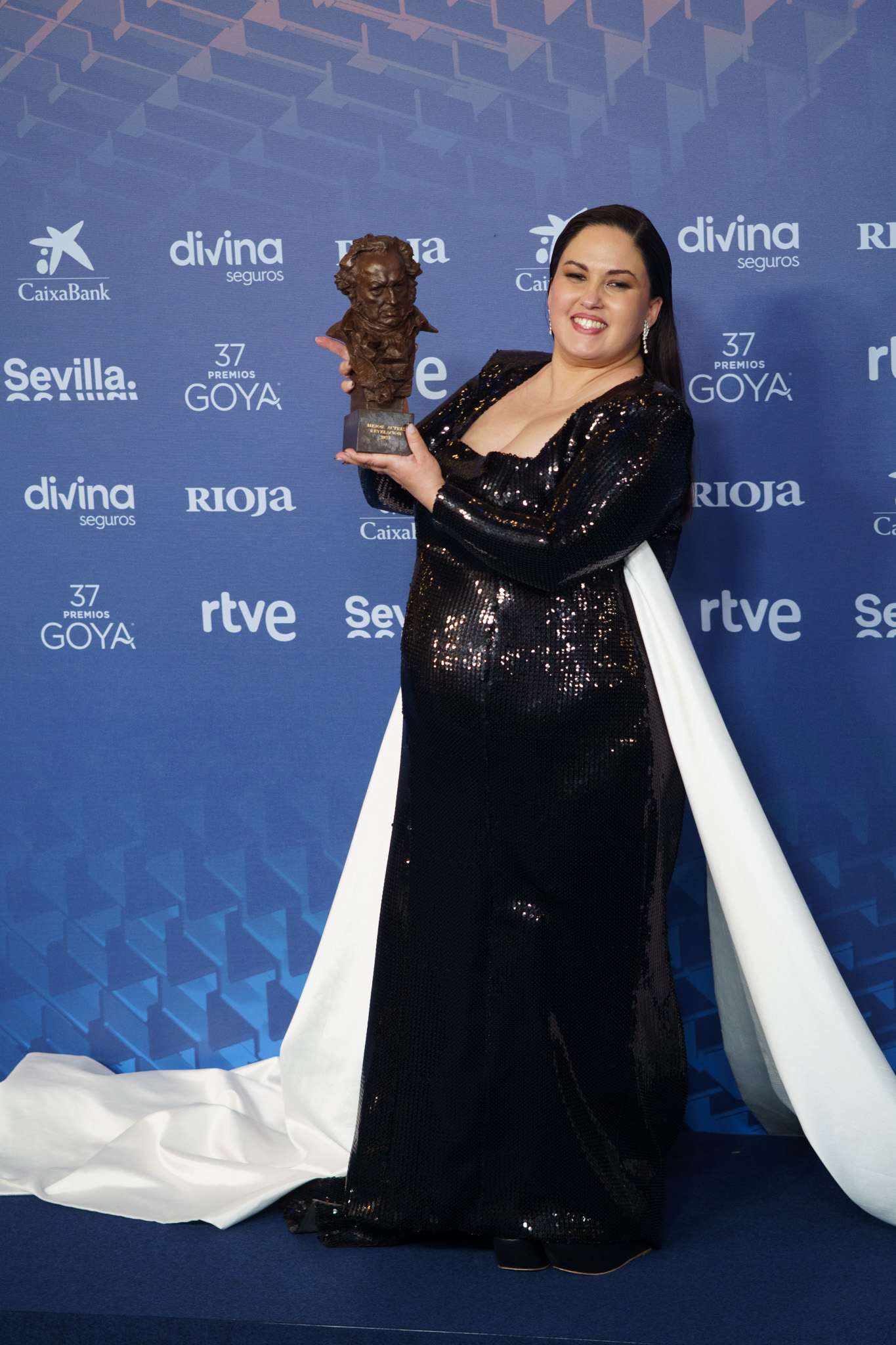
Laura Galán holding her Goya Award for Best New Actress.

Year	Award	Category	Nominee(s)	Result	Ref.
2022	40th Brussels International Fantastic Film Festival	Critics Selection		Won	
2022	17th Fantastic Fest	Best Picture (Horror Competition)		Won	
2022	15th Strasbourg European Fantastic Film Festival	Méliès d'Argent		Won	
2022	55th Sitges Film Festival	Méliès d'Or		Won	
2022	27th Toulouse Spanish Film Festival	Best Actress	Laura Galán	Won	
2022	28th Forqué Awards	Best Film Actress	Laura Galán	Nominated	
2023	10th Feroz Awards	Best Director	Carlota Pereda	Nominated	
2023	10th Feroz Awards	Best Screenplay	Carlota Pereda	Nominated	
2023	10th Feroz Awards	Best Actress in a Film	Laura Galán	Nominated	
2023	10th Feroz Awards	Best Supporting Actress in a Film	Carmen Machi	Nominated	
2023	10th Feroz Awards	Best Film Poster	Eduardo Garcia, Jorge Fuembuena	Nominated	
2023	10th Feroz Awards	Best Trailer	Marta Longás	Won	
2023	78th CEC Medals	Best New Director	Carlota Pereda	Nominated	
2023	78th CEC Medals	Best Supporting Actress	Carmen Machi	Nominated	
2023	78th CEC Medals	Best New Actress	Laura Galán	Won	
2023	78th CEC Medals	Best Adapted Screenplay	Carlota Pereda	Nominated	
2023	37th Goya Awards	Best New Director	Carlota Pereda	Nominated	
2023	37th Goya Awards	Best Adapted Screenplay	Carlota Pereda	Nominated	
2023	37th Goya Awards	Best New Actress	Laura Galán	Won	
2023	37th Goya Awards	Best Supporting Actress	Carmen Machi	Nominated	
2023	37th Goya Awards	Best Makeup and Hairstyles	Paloma Lozano, Nacho Díaz	Nominated	
2023	37th Goya Awards	Best Production Supervision	Sara García	Nominated	
2023	31st Actors and Actresses Union Awards	Best Film Actress in a Secondary Role	Carmen Machi	Nominated	
2023	31st Actors and Actresses Union Awards	Best New Actress	Laura Galán	Won	
2023	10th Platino Awards	Best Actress	Laura Galán	Nominated	
2023	10th Platino Awards	Best Supporting Actress	Carmen Machi	Nominated	
2023	1st Rolling Stone en Español Awards	Fiction Feature Film of the Year	Piggy	Nominated	
2023	1st Rolling Stone en Español Awards	Performance of the Year	Sara Galán	Nominated	

== See also ==
- List of Spanish films of 2022
- List of French films of 2022
