= Voy a pasármelo mejor =

- Theatrical release poster
- Directed by: Ana de Alva
- Screenplay by: David Serrano; Luz Cipriota
- Produced by: Enrique López Lavigne
- Starring: Izan Fernández; Raúl Arévalo; Renata Hermida; Karla Souza; Rodrigo Díaz; Rodrigo Giraja; Alba Planas; Diego Montejo; Rocío Casanova; Michel Herráiz Gurillo; Javier García; Gabriela Soto Belicha; Olaya Menéndez
- Cinematography: Joan Bordera
- Music by: Alejandro Serrano
- Production companies: David y Layla AIE; El Estudio; Paraíso Torres de Satélite
- Distributed by: Beta Fiction Spain
- Release dates: 3 July 2025 (Cines Broadway); 18 July 2025 (Spain)
- Running time: 90 minutes
- Countries: Spain; Mexico
- Language: Spanish

Voy a pasármelo mejor is a 2025 musical comedy film directed by Ana de Alva (in her feature film debut) and written by David Serrano and Luz Cipriota. A sequel to Voy a pasármelo bien (2022), it is a Spanish-Mexican co-production. Its cast features Izan Fernández, Renata Hermida, Alba Planas, Raúl Arévalo, and Karla Souza.

== Plot ==
In 1992, Los Pitus (Note: The gang of friends of the preceding film.) leave Valladolid to attend to a summer camp, experiencing multiple adventures.

== Cast ==
- Izan Fernández as David
- Renata Hermida as Layla
- Michel Herráiz as Fernando
- Rodrigo Gibaja as Luis
- Diego Montejo
- Rodrigo Díaz as Paco
- Javier García as Maroto
- Raúl Arévalo as David (adult)
- Karla Souza as Layla (adult)
- Alba Planas

== Production ==
The film is Ana de Alva's debut feature as a director. It was produced by David y Layla AIE, El Estudio Filmmakers España, and Apaches Entertainment alongside Paraíso Torres de Satélite, with the participation of Prime Video, RTVE, and ICAA and the backing from the Valladolid Film Commission. Shooting locations included Madrid, Valladolid, and Mexico. The film saw the return of the cast members of Voy a pasármelo bien, plus the cast addition of Alba Planas.

== Release ==
The film world premiered at Valladolid's Cines Broadway on 3 July 2025 ahead of the film's 18 July 2025 wide theatrical release in Spain by Beta Fiction Spain.

== See also ==
- List of Spanish films of 2025
