= Celia Monedero =

Spanish actress

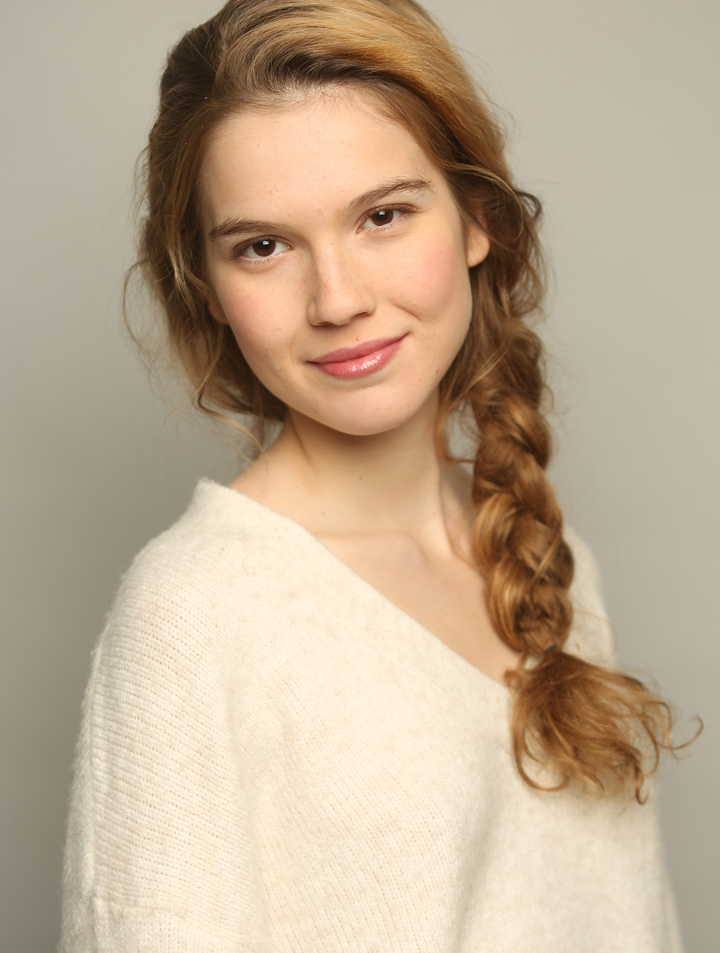
- Born: Celia Monedero Carrasco; 27 April 2000 (age 26); Madrid, Spain
- Occupation: Actress
- Years active: 2018–present
- Notable work: Skam España

Celia Monedero Carrasco (born April 27, 2000) is a Spanish actress, best known for her main role as Elvira "Viri" Gómez Garcia in Skam España, the Spanish adaptation of Skam.

== Early and personal life ==
Celia Monedero Carrasco was born and raised in Madrid, Spain. Since Monedero was a small child, she was interested in acting, eventually attending the Juan Codina Studio for acting classes. It was through these classes that she became aware of the casting process for Skam España, her first professional project.

Besides acting, Monedero is also studying psychology at a university. She has a close relationship with her father, and is a fan of the Call of Duty video games.

== Career ==
Skam España officially premiered on September 16, 2018, on Movistar+ to positive reception and popularity. The third season of the show revolved around Monedero's character of Viri, and Nicole Wallace's character, Nora. In a break from the traditional Skam, which usually only focuses on one central character at a time, España was unique in featuring a concurrent storyline with the two characters, and featuring the central viewpoint of Viri to such an extent that had never been explored in other iterations of Skam. The counterpart of Viri's character in the original Norwegian version, Vilde Hellerud Lien, only had one clip where she was the central focus in the series finale of the show. Viri's clips were originally only shown in the full episodes of season 3, but then became available clip-by-clip after the season finished airing on Movistar's official YouTube channel.

Nora and Viri's season was then awarded the "Cima TV Award for Equality" from the FesTVal de Vitoria for how it promoted themes of feminism and empowerment to a youth audience. Celia continued to appear on the show in a main role, until the show's ending on October 24, 2020.

In 2021, she appeared in two short films, Fomo and Chicas, as well as the Tutto Durán music video "El Momento."

She then went on to reunite with her Skam España co-star, Alba Planas, with a guest role on Prime Video's TV series, Días mejores, in 2022. That same year, she appeared in a recurring role as Ruth in I Don't Like Driving, which premiered exclusively in the US on HBO Max, and TNT in Spain.

In 2023, Monedero guest-starred on a season 3 episode of Netflix's Valeria as Valeria Joven.

== Filmography ==
=== Television ===
Year	Title	Character	Notes
2018–2020	Skam España	Elvira "Viri" Gómez Garcia	Main cast; 39 episodes & central character of season 3
2022	Días mejores	Ainhoa	Guest role; one episode
2022	I Don't Like Driving	Ruth from University	Recurring role; three episodes
2023	Valeria	Valeria Joven	Guest role; one episode

=== Film ===
Year	Title	Character	Notes
2024	Equipo	Marina	Short film
2024	Chicas		Short film

=== Music videos ===
Year	Title	Artist	Notes
2021	"El Momento"	Tutto Durán	Directed by Natt Monroy
