= Voy a pasármelo bien (film) =

- Theatrical release poster
- Directed by: David Serrano
- Written by: David Serrano; Luz Cipriota
- Produced by: Enrique López Lavigne
- Starring: Raúl Arévalo; Karla Souza; Dani Rovira; Raúl Jiménez; Jorge Usón; Izán Fernández; Renata Hermida Richards; Rodrigo Díaz; Rodrigo Gibaja; Michel Herráiz
- Music by: Zeltia Montes
- Production companies: El Estudio; Sony Pictures International Productions; Les Parapluies Rochefort AIE; Paraíso Torres de Satélite
- Distributed by: Sony Pictures Entertainment Iberia
- Release date: 12 August 2022 (Spain)
- Countries: Spain; Mexico
- Language: Spanish
- Box office: €2.1 million

Voy a pasármelo bien is a 2022 Spanish-Mexican musical comedy film directed by David Serrano. Named after the eponymous music album by Hombres G, it features songs by the aforementioned band. It stars Raúl Arévalo, Karla Souza, and Dani Rovira.

A sequel entitled Voy a pasármelo mejor was released in 2025.

== Plot ==
The fiction is set in Valladolid. Initially taking place in 1989, the plot features two tweens (David and Layla) bonded by their love of Hombres G who meet again decades later, when Layla, having become a successful filmmaker, visits her hometown.

== Cast ==
- Raúl Arévalo as David (adult)
- Izán Fernández as David (child)
- Karla Souza as Layla (adult)
- Renata Hermida Richards as Layla (child)
- Dani Rovira as Paco Perona
- Rodrígo Díaz as Paco (child)
- Isabel Aerenlund
- Raúl Jiménez as Luis
- Rodrigo Gibaja as Luis
- Jorge Usón as Fernando "el Cabra"
- Michel Herráiz as Fernando "el Cabra"
- Gabriela Soto as Almudena
- Teresa Hurtado de Ory as Almudena
- Isabel Pera

== Production ==
The screenplay of Voy a pasármelo bien was penned by David Serrano alongside Luz Cipriota. A Spanish-Mexican co-production, the film was produced by El Estudio and Sony Pictures International Productions alongside Les Parapluies Rochefort AIE and Paraíso Torres de Satélite. The film also had support from the Valladolid Film Office. Production began filming on 6 August 2021. Shooting took place in Spain, including Valladolid and Guadalajara.

== Release ==
Distributed by Sony Pictures Entertainment Iberia, the film was theatrically released in Spain on 12 August 2022. Amazon Prime Video (in exclusivity for the first five years) and RTVE nabbed streaming rights for the post-theatrical window. It grossed €2.1 million at the Spanish box office, good for the 9th-largest Spanish release in 2022.

== Reception ==
According to the review aggregation website Rotten Tomatoes, Voy a pasármelo bien has a 100% approval rating based on 5 reviews from critics, with an average rating of 7.3/10.

Raquel Hernández Luján of HobbyConsolas scored 80 out of 100 points ("very good") deeming the film to be "very enjoyable in every way", praising the balance between drama and comedy as well as the young cast, while finding that the budget constraints are noticeable, especially in outdoor settings.

Andrea G. Bermejo of Cinemanía rated the film 3½ out of 5 stars assessing that the cast, artwork, costumes and staging make up a measured and "soulful" nostalgic journey, even if some elements from the past timeline are reiterative and some scenes from the present timeline are somewhat lacking.

Federico Marín Bellón of ABC rated the film 4 out of 5 stars, writing that Serrano (jointly with Cipriota), manages to "compose a story full of good taste and desire to have a good time".

=== Top ten lists ===
The film appeared on a number of critics' top ten lists of the best Spanish films of 2022:

- 1st — ABC (Oti Rodríguez Marchante)
- 6th — El Cultural (Juan Sardá)
- 8th — El Confidencial (Marta Medina)

== Accolades ==
Year	Award	Category	Nominee(s)	Result	Ref.
2023	10th Feroz Awards	Best Comedy Film		Nominated	
2023	78th CEC Medals	Best New Actor	David Lorente	Nominated	

== Sequel ==
The sequel Voy a pasármelo mejor, written by Serrano and Cipriota with newcomer Ana de Alva in direction duties, is set to be released in 2025.

== See also ==
- List of Spanish films of 2022
