= Rizha =

Argentine actress and singer

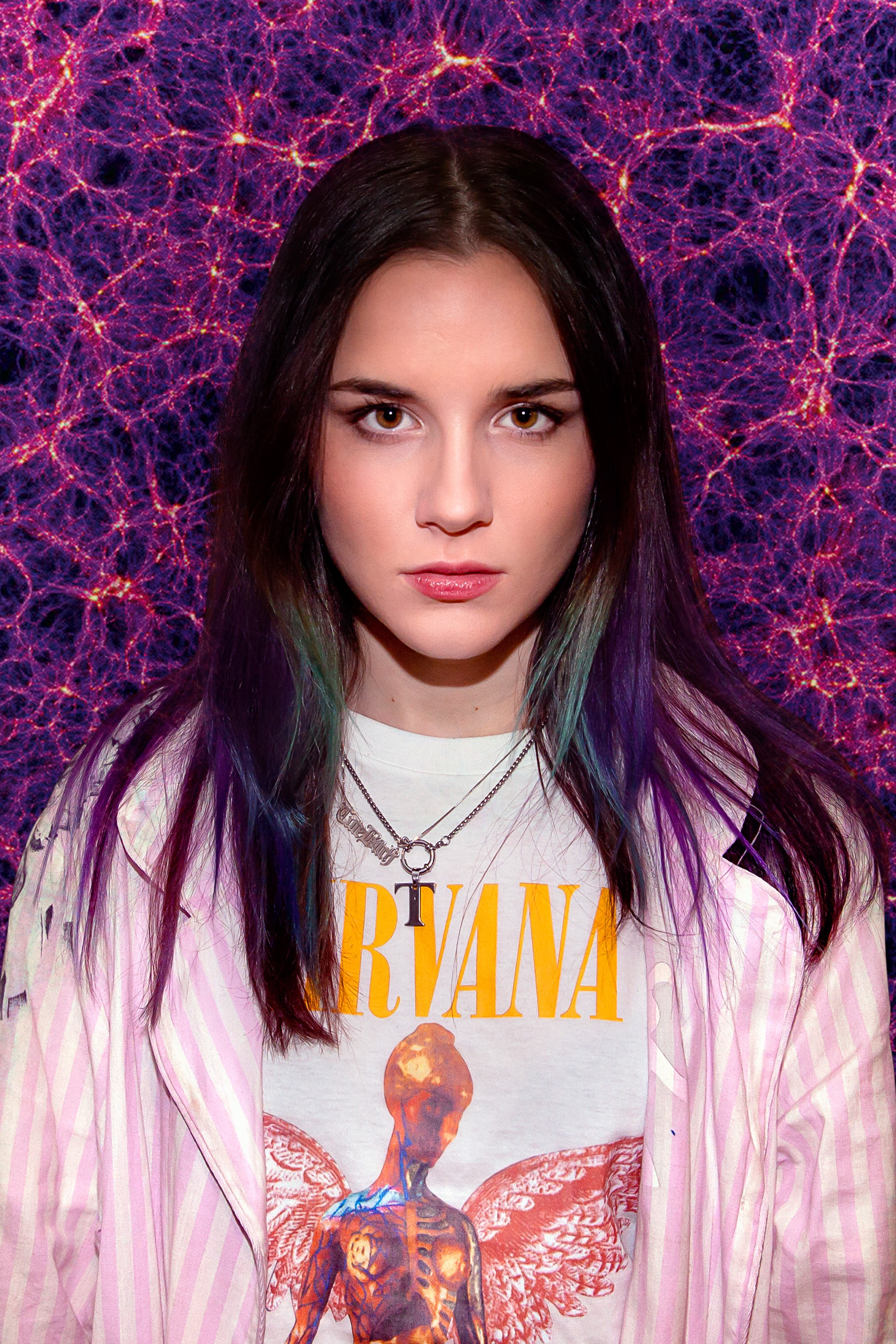
- Promotional photo of Rizha taken in 2019.

Background information
- Born: Tamara Luz Ronchese Bonetto; July 26, 1999 (age 26); Rosario, Argentina
- Origin: Spain
- Genres: Alternative; pop; rock; electronic rock; minimal; ambient; electropop; hyperpop
- Occupations: Actress; singer
- Instruments: Vocals; guitar
- Years active: 2006–present
- Labels: Universal Music Publishing Group (2012-2017); Sony Music Spain (2019–2020); Ghost Kid Records (2017–present); Nacional Records (2020–present)
- Website: www.rizhaofficial.com

Tamara Luz Ronchese Bonetto, known professionally as Rizha, (born July 26, 1999) is an Argentine actress and singer, best known for her main role as Joana Bianchi Acosta in Skam España, the Spanish adaptation of Skam, and for her role of Angel X in the film Teen Spirit, starring Elle Fanning and Rebecca Hall.

== Early life ==
Tamara Luz Ronchese Bonetto was born in Rosario, Argentina to Fernando Ronchese and Malvina Bonetto. She grew up in Las Rosas, and by the age of six, she had learned how to play the guitar, and by eight, she was learning to compose her own songs in Spanish. From 2002 to 2012, she studied primarily at the Dante Alighieri school.

At the age of 13, she moved with her family to Madrid, Spain. She finished her secondary education there, and enrolled at the Complutense University of Madrid to study philosophy in 2018.

== Career ==
=== Music (2014–present) ===
After moving to Spain and starting high school, Ronchese was accidentally discovered by a Universal Music Publishing talent scout named Jordi Tello, who after seeing her perform on a cell phone video recording, offered to help her develop her professional career as an artist.

When starting her music career at 14, she decided to call herself "Rizha." By the end of 2013, she had begun to appear in magazines, including Vanity Fair and the Spanish music magazine 40 Principales. She quickly followed up with her debut EP in 2014, called Grandma Jewels, which was produced in collaboration with Fernando Gómez of the Venezuelan music duo Masseratti 2lts. A music video for the track Back Home was released in 2015.

In 2017, Rizha released her debut album, called FINALLY. On the album, she was also credited as a producer. The album was well received by the public, industry figures, and radio stations, including Radio 3 and Los 40 Principales.

The next year, Rizha released EPs LIFTED, a collaboration with Chesko, and Fuckit. By 2019, she had released her second studio album, OUTSIDE and two more EPs called HIPNOS and DYSNOMIA a collaboration with Ikki.

She has continued releasing music at a rapid pace. She released her third studio album FEVER DREAM in 2020, along with EPs I DON'T NEED YOUR VALIDATION, YOU NEVER MEET MY EXPECTATIONS and XX, where the songs were sung exclusively in Spanish. The years 2021 and 2022 saw Rizha release a total of twelve singles combined, including songs Aladdin 2.0 and LLORANDO A 160BPM.

In September 2023, Rizha dropped a new single, HUMO, along with a music video for the track. She quickly followed up on this release, featuring on Rakky Ripper and detunedfreq's song, RUIDO, and then releasing a new song in English, ADHD, in October.

In January 2024, Rizha released her much anticipated album LLORANDO A 160BPM. Making it her Fourth studio album. Featuring songs like MIDAS ft LVL1, and LIBIDO ft Rakky Ripper. Soon after in April 2024, Rizha released her new EP . (period) featuring popular songs like FANGS. Rizha has since continued releasing new music at a steady pace for all of her fans.

=== Acting (2006–present) ===
As a child, Ronchese was featured in short films La llamada and Ente in small roles. She made a guest appearance on Centro médico in 2017, and then made her English-language debut as singer Angel X in 2018's Teen Spirit, directed and written by Max Minghella.

In 2019, she was cast in the role of Joana Bianchi Acosta in season 2 of Skam España, based on the popular Norwegian teen drama series, Skam. Joana was the love interest of season 2's central character, Cristina "Cris" Soto Peña, played by actress Irene Ferreiro. In a break from the traditional Skam, where a season centers around the romance of two teenage boys, España chose to have the storyline revolve around two teenage girls, and the topics of bisexuality, borderline personality disorder, familial struggles, and dealing with problems and decision-making through Cris, Joana, and their relationship.

She continued to appear on the show through seasons 3 and 4. The final episode aired in October 2020. For its third season, which centered around the characters of Nora and Viri, Skam España was awarded the "Cima TV Award for Equality" from the FesTVal de Vitoria for how it promoted themes of feminism and empowerment to a youth audience. Rizha's music was also featured in the show's soundtrack for seasons 1 and 4.

Ronchese has continued to act, appearing in the movie I Can Quit Whenever I Want in a small role. She will also soon be featured in the short film, The Same, as herself.

== Filmography ==
=== Television ===
Year	Title	Character	Notes
2017	Centro médico	Claudia	Guest cast; one episode
2019–2020	Skam España	Joana Bianchi Acosta	Main cast; 20 episodes (seasons 2–4)

=== Film ===
Year	Title	Character	Notes
2006	La llamada	Little girl	Short film
2014	Ente	Daughter	Short film
2018	Teen Spirit	Angel X	English-language debut
2019	I Can Quit Whenever I Want	Fan of chemistry	Minor role
TBA	The Same	Herself	Short film

=== Music videos ===
Year	Title	Director
2015	"Back home"	Fernando Ronchese
2017	"One To The Drunk Goods"	Fernando Ronchese
2017	"Lost My Voice"	Vincent Lecerf
2017	"Happy Bummer Day"	Fernando Ronchese
2018	"Makeup"	Fernando Ronchese
2018	"Your Bong"	Rizha
2019	"Around"	Fernando Ronchese
2019	"Money"	Fernando Ronchese
2019	"Game"	Fernando Ronchese
2019	"Endling"	Fernando Ronchese
2019	"You can see you coming"	Fernando Ronchese
2020	"Fly Con Vos"	Fernando Ronchese
2020	"20"	Rizha
2020	"Fever Dream"	Rizha
2021	"Aladdin 2.0"	Loz Visuals
2023	"HUMO"	Rizha & @holamellamodiegoarmando
2023	"RUIDO"	Martin Caballero
2024	"BELLA SWAN"	Rizha

== Discography ==
=== Studio albums ===
Year	Title	Notes
2017	"Finally"	Contains 12 songs
2019	"OUTSIDE"	Contains 11 songs
2020	"FEVER DREAM"	Contains 12 songs, 5 are collaborations
2024	"LLORANDO A 160BPM"	Contains 12 songs, 5 are collaborations

=== EPs ===
Year	Title	Notes
2014	"Grandma Jewels"	Collaboration with Fernando Gómez of Masseratti 2lts
2018	"Lifted"	Collaboration with Chesko
2018	"Fuckit"	
2019	"Hipnos"	
2019	"Dysnomia"	Collaboration with Ikki
2020	"I DON'T NEED YOUR VALIDATION, YOU NEVER MEET MY EXPECTATIONS"	
2020	"XX"	
2024	" . " (Period)	

=== Singles ===
Year	Title	Notes
2017	"Every Day is Halloween"	
2017	"Even if it hurts a little"	Collaboration with Exavia
2019	"All Around The World"	Collaboration with Sandjake
2019	"Follow rivers"	Cover of Lykke Li's song
2019	"No Sweater"	Collaboration with Crystal Face
2020	"Start Over"	Collaboration with Chesko
2020	"Right Here"	Cover of Lil Peep's song
2021	"Heaven"	
2021	"Kill The Machine "	Collaboration with Putochinomaricon
2021	"Glitt3r"	Collaboration with Glitch Gum
2021	"Slow Dance With You"	Cover of Marceline's song
2021	"Mario Kart"	
2021	"Sims"	
2021	"Aladdin 2.0"	Collaboration with July Jones
2021	"Highchair"	
2022	"NO MOLESTAR"	Collaboration with Traw
2022	"LLORANDO A 160BPM"	
2022	"VAMONOS"	
2022	"ICONIC"	
2023	"HUMO"	
2023	"RUIDO"	Collaboration with Rakky Ripper and detunedfreq
2023	"ADHD"	
2024	"MIDAS"	Collaboration with LVL1

=== Soundtrack ===
Year	Title	Notes
2017	"Way Up"	Original theme of the movie The Night After My Girlfriend Leave Me, directed by Fernando Ronchese
