= When You Least Expect It =

Spanish dramedy television series

- Spanish: Días mejores
- Created by: Cristóbal Garrido; Adolfo Valor
- Directed by: Alejo Flah; Arantxa Echevarría; Jota Linares
- Starring: Blanca Portillo; Francesc Orella; Marta Hazas; Erick Elías; Alba Planas
- Country of origin: Spain
- Original language: Spanish
- No. of seasons: 1
- No. of episodes: 10

Production
- Production companies: VIS; Zeta Studios

Original release
- Network: Amazon Prime Video
- Release: 22 April 2022

When You Least Expect It (Spanish: Días mejores) is a Spanish dramedy television series created by Cristóbal Garrido and Adolfo Valor which stars Blanca Portillo alongside Francesc Orella, Marta Hazas, Erick Elías, and Alba Planas. It premiered on Amazon Prime Video on 22 April 2022.

== Plot ==
Four strangers from different backgrounds (Pardo, Luis, Graci and Sara) meet in a group therapy session led by Dr. Laforet to find a way to move forward with their lives.

== Cast ==
- Blanca Portillo as Dr. Laforet
- Marta Hazas as Sara
- Pablo de Santos as Fede
- Ismael Martínez as Jose
- Erick Elías as Pardo
- Ana Jara as Lali
- Quique González as Álvaro
- Alba Planas as Graci
- Francesc Orella as Luis
- Daniela Brown as Ana
- Vicenta N'Dongo as Carmen
- Carles Francino
- Celia Monedero as Ainhoa

== Production ==
Created by Cristóbal Garrido and Adolfo Valor, the series was produced by VIS and Zeta Studios. Alejo Flah, Arantxa Echevarría, and Jota Linares took over direction duties. It consists of 10 episodes.

== Release ==
Distributed by Amazon Prime Video, the series premiered in Spain on 22 April 2022. The series was released in the United States by Paramount+ in August 2022.

== Accolades ==
Year	Award	Category	Nominee(s)	Result	Ref.
2022	24th Iris Awards	Best Actress	Blanca Portillo	Pending	
