= Hajar Brown =

Spanish actress

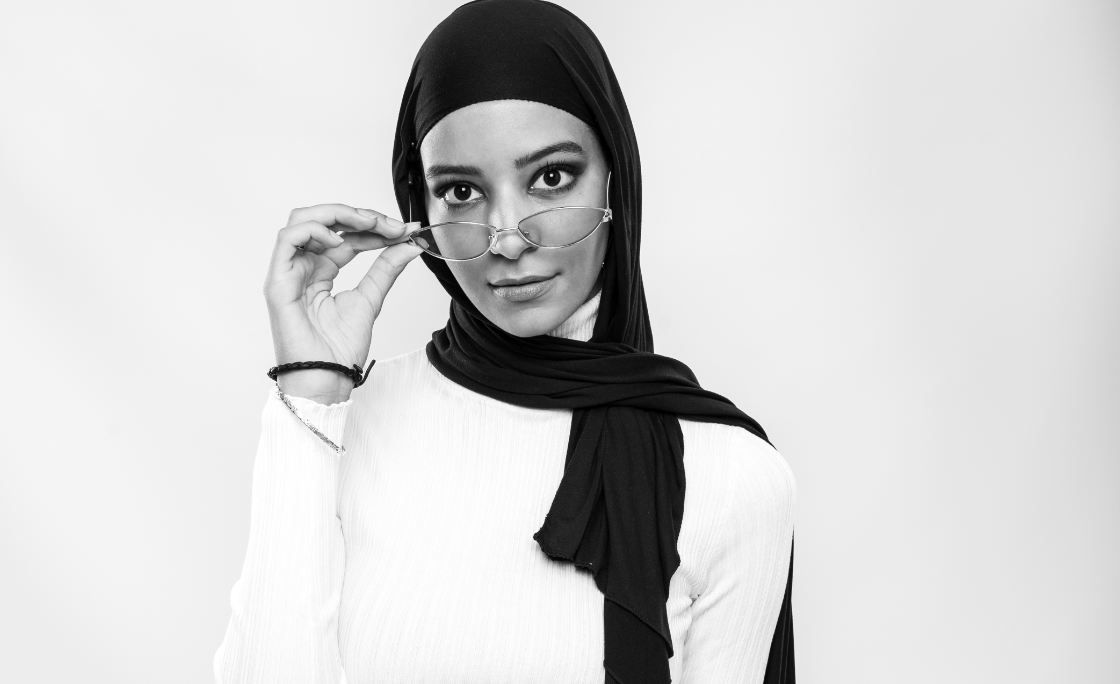
- Born: Hajar El Bahraoui; 15 March 1996 (age 29); Madrid, Spain
- Occupations: Actress; model; activist
- Notable work: Skam España
- Height: 170 cm (5 ft 7 in)

Hajar El Bahraoui, known professionally as Hajar Brown, (born March 15, 1996) is a Spanish-Moroccan actress, model, and activist, best known for her role as Amira Naybet in Skam España, the Spanish adaptation of Skam.

== Early life ==
Hajar Brown was born in Madrid, Spain to Moroccan parents. She dreamed of being an actress at an early age, going on to study acting professionally for four years, from 14 to 18 years old. However, she then decided to focus on her university studies, opting to major in Civil Engineering at the Polytechnic University of Madrid. Even so, she remained linked to the world of acting, participating in different short films, usually with other college students.

Brown is also a practicing Muslim. She can speak Spanish, English, French, and the Moroccan Arabic language, Darija.

== Involvement with Skam ==
A fan of the original version of Skam, a Norwegian teen drama created by Julie Andem, Brown was contacted by the production team in charge of adapting the show for a Spanish audience. They had seen how she talked about her day-to-day life as a practitioner of Islam on various social networks, and were seeking guidance on how to translate the character of Sana Bakkoush, a Muslim teenager who is religious by choice, and encounters prejudice she must deal with regularly.

After the Skam España showrunners worked with Brown to better understand Muslim life in Spain, she was later cast herself to portray Amira, the Spanish counterpart of Sana.

== Career ==
Skam España officially premiered on September 16, 2018, on Movistar+ to positive reception and popularity. The fourth and final season centers around Brown's character of Amira Naybet, and how she faces the challenge of being a Muslim faithful to her beliefs and customs in an environment and society that looks at her in a strange way for being different and wearing a hijab. Brown's appearance in the show made her the first actress with a veil recognized in Spain for her achievements.

The success of Spain's version of Skam also helped to open other doors for Brown, who later debuted as a Spanish ambassador for the Chloé perfume in October 2020, as well as collaborating with Elle Spain magazine that same year. She has also collaborated with the Spanish counterparts of Cosmopolitan and Vogue in later years, appearing on the latter's YouTube channel in July 2023 demonstrating her makeup routine and hijab tutorial.

She also has done influencer work on behalf of companies like Hugo Boss, Bershka, and Electronic Arts.

In August 2023, it was announced that Hajar would be one of the protagonists in Islamization, a six-episode romantic comedy from Compostela production company CTV. The show is partly funded by financial aid through the European Union's Regional Development Fund, a response to alleviate the effects of the COVID-19 pandemic to the most affected sectors of the economy. Islamization was described as "a love story—a universal story—with comedy and a European approach." Brown was also noted to have contributed to the production's script as a consultant.

== Activism ==
Brown seeks to use her creative gifts to emphasize a message in favor of a more democratic and inclusive artist concept and to break stereotypes. Since 2018, she has served as a Coordinator of the Advertising and Media Commission of the Association of Muslim Girls of Spain.

In September 2020, she defended the importance of intersectional and inclusive feminism in a speech at the FesTVal de Vitoria, an event where Skam España received the "Cima TV Award for Equality" for how it promoted feminist values and themes of empowerment to a youth audience for its third season, which focused around the characters of Nora and Viri, two of Amira's best friends.

In October 2023, Brown went viral online when she made a TikTok video describing an Islamophobic incident she endured while attending the opera. While wrapping up her video, she said she wanted to bring attention to this certain situation because of the violent comments and behavior she faced, unlike other incidences she's learned to ignore in her everyday life. The video gained more than 42,000 likes in just a few days, as well as media attention. Many in the industry, including Brown's Skam España co-star, Nicole Wallace, also offered her their support.

== Filmography ==
=== Television ===
Year	Title	Character	Notes
2018–2020	Skam España	Amira Naybet	Main role; 39 episodes & central character of season 4
2021	Alba	Fatia	Recurring role; 4 episodes
TBA	Islamization	TBA	Main role & script consultant

=== Film ===
Year	Title	Character	Notes
2017	SKAM Hajar	Hajar	Short film

=== Music videos ===
Year	Title	Artist
2021	"Con cuidao"	Shack Rose
2021	"Nosotras"	Paula Cendejas
