= The Silence of Marcos Tremmer =

- Theatrical release poster
- Directed by: Miguel García de la Calera
- Written by: Javier Dampierre; Ricardo Urroz
- Produced by: Matias Cardone; Pedro José de la Fuente García; Hans García; Carlos Hansen; Federico Moreira; Adolfo López Sojo
- Starring: Benjamín Vicuña; Adriana Ugarte
- Cinematography: Analia Pollio
- Edited by: Damian Tetelbaum
- Music by: Miguel Miranda; José Miguel Tobar
- Production companies: Helix; La Higuera Films; Gonitel; Inversiones Cinematográficas; Ibermedia; Uruguay Audiovisual
- Release dates: November 29, 2024 (Mar del Plata); January 2, 2025 (Uruguay); January 16, 2025 (Chile); July 31, 2025 (Dominican Republic)
- Running time: 112 minutes
- Countries: Spain; Dominican Republic; Uruguay; Chile
- Language: Spanish

The Silence of Marcos Tremmer (Spanish: El silencio de Marcos Tremmer) is a 2024 romantic drama film directed by Miguel García de la Calera and written by Javier Dampierre and Ricardo Urroz. It stars Benjamín Vicuña and Adriana Ugarte as a couple whose relationship will be affected when Marcos Tremmer is diagnosed with a fatal illness.

A co-production between Spain, the Dominican Republic, Uruguay and Chile, the film premiered on November 29, 2024, at the 39th Mar del Plata International Film Festival.

== Sinopsis ==
Marcos Tremmer is a Uruguayan publicist living in Madrid, Spain, with his wife, Lucía, whom he loves dearly. However, Marcos is diagnosed with a life-threatening illness and will soon die. As a result, he distances himself from Lucía so she can rebuild her life without him.

== Cast ==
The actors participating in this film are:

- Benjamín Vicuña as Marcos Tremmer
- Adriana Ugarte as Lucía
- Félix Gómez as Roberto
- Daniel Hendler as Dr. Alejandro Tremmer
- Enrique Villén as Señor Museo
- Hony Estrella as Susana
- Mirta Busnelli as Catalina Tremmer
- Irene Ferreiro as Natalia
- Rodo Castañares as Leonardo
- Julián Valcárcel as Pedro
- Walter Rey as Abelardo
- Andrés López Sierra as Oncologist

== Production ==
Principal photography was divided into three parts. The first phase lasted three weeks between mid-March and early April 2023 in Montevideo and Colonia de Sacramento, Uruguay. The second phase lasted throughout July of the same year in Plaza Mayor and Gran Vía, Madrid, Spain. Finally, the third phase took place between September and October of the same year in Santo Domingo, Dominican Republic.

== Release ==
The Silence of Marcos Tremmer had its world premiere on November 29, 2024, at the 39th Mar del Plata International Film Festival, then screened in December of the same year at the 45th Havana Film Festival, on January 10, 2025, at the Wikén Film Festival, on January 31, 2025, at the 17th Santo Domingo Global Film Festival, and on February 18, 2025, at the 27th Punta del Este International Film Festival.

The film was released commercially on January 2, 2025, in Uruguayan theaters, on January 16, 2025, in Chilean theaters, and on July 31, 2025, in Dominican theaters. It was released in Latin America on February 26, 2025, on Amazon Prime Video, and on May 8, 2025, in the rest of the world.

== Accolades ==
Award	Ceremony date	Category	Recipient(s)	Result	Ref.
Mar del Plata International Film Festival	1 December 2024	Latin-American Competition - Best Film	The Silence of Marcos Tremmer	Nominated	
