= Skam España =

Spanish television series

- Genre: Teen drama
- Based on: Skam by Julie Andem
- Directed by: Begoña Álvarez; Farhan Adhara; José Ramón Ayerra
- Starring: Alba Planas; Irene Ferreiro; Nicole Wallace; Hajar Brown; Celia Monedero
- Country of origin: Spain
- Original language: Spanish
- No. of seasons: 4
- No. of episodes: 39

Production
- Running time: 13–45 minutes
- Production companies: Movistar+; Zeppelin TV

Original release
- Network: Movistar+
- Release: 16 September 2018 – 24 October 2020

Skam España (transl. 'Skam Spain'; often stylised as SKAM España) is a Spanish teen drama television series based on the Norwegian television series Skam. Its four seasons originally aired from September 2018 to October 2020 on Movistar+.

== Premise ==
The fiction follows the lives of a group of teenagers (most notably Eva, Cris, Nora, Viri and Amira), who study at the IES Isabel la Católica high school near El Retiro, in Madrid, dealing with issues such as shame, loneliness, self-acceptance, bullying, bisexuality, feminism, empowerment, sorority and toxic relationships.

== Characters ==
The following are characters in Skam España, and their counterparts from the original Norwegian series:

Actor	Character	Based on				
Actor	Character	Based on	Season 1	Season 2	Season 3	Season 4
Central characters
Alba Planas	Eva Vázquez Villanueva	Eva Kviig Mohn	Central	Main	Main	Main
Irene Ferreiro	Cristina "Cris" Soto Peña	Isak Valtersen	Main	Central	Main	Main
Irene Ferreiro	Cristina "Cris" Soto Peña	Christina "Chris" Berg	Main	Central	Main	Main
Nicole Wallace	Nora Grace	Noora Amalie Sætre	Main	Main	Central	Main
Celia Monedero	Elvira "Viri" Gómez García	Vilde Hellerud Lien	Main	Main	Central	Main
Hajar Brown	Amira Naybet	Sana Bakkoush	Main	Main	Main	Central
Main characters
Tomy Aguilera	Jorge Crespo Gimeno	Jonas Noah Vasquez	Main	Recurring	Recurring	Recurring
Alejandro Reina	Lucas Rubio Fernández	Isak Valtersen	Main	Recurring	Recurring	Main
Alejandro Reina	Lucas Rubio Fernández	Eskild Tryggvasson	Main	Recurring	Recurring	Main
Fernando Líndez	Alejandro Beltrán de Miguel	William Magnusson	Recurring	Recurring	Main	Main
Tamara Ronchese	Joana Bianchi Acosta	Even Bech Næsheim		Main	Main	Main
Álex Villazán	Miquel Pombo Clemente	William Magnusson			Main	
Álex Villazán	Miquel Pombo Clemente	Nikolai Magnusson			Main	
Lucas Nabor	Daniel "Dani" Soto Peña	Yousef Acar		Recurring	Recurring	Main
Sofian El Ben	Kasim Hamed					Main
Mariam Merrouni	Dounia Hamed	Jamilla Bikarim				Main
Recurring characters
Ruth Bosser	Inés Serrano Martínez	Ingrid Theis Gaupseth	Recurring	Recurring		Recurring
Gabriel Guevara	Cristian "Cris" Miralles Haro	Christoffer "Penetrator-Chris" Schistad	Recurring	Recurring		
Álvaro Cobas	Hugo Centeno	Magnus Fossbakken	Recurring	Recurring	Recurring	Recurring
Gonzalo Pendolema	Dilan	Mahdi Disi	Recurring	Recurring	Recurring	Recurring
Claudia Roset	Lara Louzan Castaño	Iben Sandberg	Recurring			Guest
Iván Sánchez	Rubén	Emma W. Larzen		Recurring		Guest
Guille Guibbs	Eloy Zuñiga	Sonja		Recurring		
Paula Vincente	Emma Grace	Eskild Tryggvasson			Recurring	
Nadia Bettahar	Noor					Recurring
Aicha Martínez	Elena					Recurring

=== Central cast ===
- Alba Planas as Eva Vázquez Villanueva (born 24 November 2002), the main character of the first season. It is established that before the beginning of the series, Eva used to be a popular and outgoing student. However, her friendship with Inés ended when Eva began dating Jorge, Inés' former boyfriend. Because of how their relationship started, Eva struggles to trust Jorge, eventually cheating on him with Cristian. They break up at the end of the first season, but remain close friends in later seasons. Eva also becomes close with Nora, Cris, Viri and Amira, helping to plan class events and a graduation trip, and regains the self-confidence and outgoing personality she had before the beginning of the series.
- Irene Ferreiro as Cristina "Cris" Soto Peña (born 12 November 2002), the main character of season 2. She inhabits traits of both Isak Valtersen and Christina "Chris" Berg from the original series, struggling to make important decisions and deal with her problems head on, while also coming to terms with her attraction to Joana, a new girl at school, and her bisexual identity. As her season comes to a close, she becomes more thoughtful and wise, and reaffirms her commitment towards a romantic relationship with Joana. She has been best friends with Amira since primary school, and also struggles with her friend's decision to put on the hijab and reaffirm her faith as a Muslim early on in the series.
- Nicole Wallace as Nora Grace (born 13 February 2002), one of the central protagonists of season 3. In the beginning of the series, Nora has recently moved back to Madrid from Madison, Wisconsin. She is very empathetic, kind and sensitive to others, and identifies with feminist causes. Her attraction to popular boy Alejandro is a major recurring storyline throughout the show, and is a point of internal strife for Nora. In an effort to get over Alejandro, she dates childhood friend Miquel in season 3, but quickly finds herself in a toxic relationship. After the end of that relationship, she reaffirms her feelings to Alejandro in season 4, and finds strength in speaking up about her experiences.
- Celia Monedero as Elvira "Viri" Gómez García (born 3 April 2002), one of the central protagonists of season 3. In the beginning of the series, Viri presents herself as a girl from a well-to-do family, but avoids talking about her family or having her friends over to her home. It is later revealed that Viri's father lost his job in the Spanish financial crisis, and her mother works long hours to cover the bills. Most of Viri's clothes are thrifted or hand-me-downs, and instead of an extravagant house, she lives in an apartment building. In season 3, Viri decides to get a job to support her family, and also forms up a romantic connection with Hugo, one of Jorge's friends. She gains the courage to be honest about her home life with her friends by the end of the season. Viri spearheads the graduation trip planning, and is also the class representative at their school.
- Hajar Brown as Amira Naybet (born 9 August 2002), the central character of the fourth and final season. Before the beginning of the series, Amira recently decided to put on the hijab, as well as letting go of habits like smoking and drinking. This is a recurring theme throughout the show, as Amira struggles to relate to her friends that still smoke, drink and flirt. She has been best friends with Cris since primary school, and supports Cris when she realizes she has feelings for Joana. Amira also has a crush on Cris' older brother, Dani, a recurring storyline that takes center stage in season 4, when she realizes that Dani returns those feelings, and the two have to navigate a potential romantic relationship between a Muslim and a non-Muslim.

=== Main cast ===
- Tomy Aguilera as Jorge Crespo Gimeno (born 15 July 2002), who is dating Eva in the first season before they end their romantic relationship. They remain close friends. Jorge is best friends with Lucas, Hugo, and Dilan, and also attends the Isabel la Católica school. He is musically inclined.
- Alejandro Reina as Lucas Rubio Fernández (born 4 September 2002), Jorge's best friend. He comes out as gay to Eva in the first season, and then later comes out publicly to his friends, family and classmates in season 2. He supports Cris as she comes to terms with her identity and her feelings for Joana. Later in the series, Lucas struggles with his mental health and his turbulent relationship with Kasim, a closeted Muslim teen. Lucas embodies traits and storylines of both Isak Valtersen and Eskild Tryggvasson of the original series.
- Fernando Lindez as Alejandro Beltrán de Miguel (born 10 February 2000) is a popular boy at school who often has many romantic interests, including Viri and Inés. However, he remains enamored with Nora, and through their friendship and eventual romantic relationship, Alejandro matures, becomes a better friend and classmate, and takes responsibility for his actions. He is older than the girls, but is held back in season 3 and 4 due to poor grades.
- Tamara Ronchese as Joana Bianchi Acosta (born 7 July 2001), is a mysterious new girl that transfers to Isabel la Católica school in season 2. She is very gifted artistically, and also struggles with borderline personality disorder, or BPD, which requires her to take medication, go to therapy, and occasionally be hospitalized. Joana begins a romantic relationship with Cris in the second season, which continues throughout the rest of the show.
- Álex Villazán as Miquel Pombo Clemente (born 20 April 1999), a childhood friend of both Nora and Emma Grace, with who he becomes reacquainted with in the third season. Miquel is in college, and about the same age as Nora's sister. He soon begins a romantic relationship with Nora, who has broken up with Alejandro. However, his controlling, jealous and aggressive behaviors towards Nora causes her to break up with him, and she threatens to report him to the police.
- Lucas Nabor as Daniel "Dani" Soto Peña (born 5 January 1999), Cris' older brother, who often holds her accountable for her actions. When she comes out to him as bisexual at the end of season 2, he is very supportive. In season 3, Dani begins helping out with Amira's Muslim community outreach group, "Las Labass," by teaching rugby to young kids. In season 4, he admits he did this to be closer to Amira, and the two begin an interfaith romantic relationship.
- Sofian al Ben as Kasim Hamed (born 14 December 2001), a closeted Muslim teenager who is romantically involved with Lucas, and tries to balance his responsibilities to his family with his identity as a gay man. Kasim is an original character in Skam España, based on an unnamed Muslim man Eskild mentions he was romantically involved with at some point in the original show and expanded upon in the Spanish adaptation. He is Dounia's brother.
- Mariam Merrouni as Dounia Hamed, Kasim's sister, and a friend of Amira who is also involved with "Las Labass." Dounia is passionate about her work, and also warns Amira about being a devout Muslim with non-Muslim friends that may not understand her experiences or involve her in certain events. She is based on Jamilla Bikarim from the original series.

=== Recurring cast ===
- Ruth Bosser as Inés Serrano Martínez (born 6 October 2002), Eva's former best friend, and Jorge's ex-girlfriend. Inés is initially cold, distant, and rude to Eva in the beginning of the first season, but the two girls eventually make up and become friendly again. Inés is incredibly popular, pretty, and outgoing, and wields a lot of social currency in the girls' class at school. She also is involved with Alejandro during season 2, but he breaks up with her because he is still interested in Nora.
- Gabriel Guevara as Cristian "Cris" Miralles Haro (born 28 January 2001), Alejandro's best friend. He cheats on Lara with Eva during the first season, and continues to be involved with Eva throughout season 2, something that bothers Nora and Jorge. He graduates high school at the end of season 2.
- Álvaro Cobas as Hugo Centeno (born 28 March 2002), one of Jorge's best friends and a classmate of the girls. He is fun-loving, humorous, and is also a gifted rapper. He and Cris are romantically involved in season 1, but he takes a more prominent role in season 3 when he takes a romantic interest in Viri.
- Gonzalo Pendolema as Dilan, one of Jorge's best friends, and is often a source of comic relief for his friends and classmates.
- Claudia Roset as Lara Louzan Castaño (born 12 March 2002), a new student who becomes an acquaintance of Eva in season 1. She is later romantically involved with Boy Cris, which she breaks off when he cheats on her and treats her poorly. She returns in season 4, at a party celebrating the class's graduation from high school.
- Iván Sánchez as Rubén, Dani's best friend, who is romantically involved with Cris throughout season 2. However, as Cris is navigating her confusion surrounding her feelings for Joana, she does treat him poorly, which Dani calls her out for. He returns in season 4, when Dani invites Amira out to meet his friends.
- Guille Gibbs as Eloy Zuñiga (born 20 September 2002), Joana's former boyfriend. They break up early in season 2, when Joana realizes she has much deeper feelings for Cris.
- Paula Vincente as Emma Grace, Nora's older sister. She is also childhood friends with Miquel, but soon realizes the toll that Nora and Miquel's relationship is taking on her younger sister. She resides in New York City, and works in a restaurant. Emma struggles with past trauma from a sexual assault, which was mishandled by the police.
- Nadia Bettahar as Noor, a Muslim teenager and friend of Amira involved with "Las Labass."
- Aicha Martinez as Elena, another Muslim teenager and friend of Amira involved in "Las Labass."

== Production and release ==
Skam España consists of an adaptation of the Norwegian series Skam. Produced by Movistar+ in collaboration with Zeppelin TV, the episodes were directed by Begoña Álvarez and José Ramón Ayerra. The series premiered on 16 September 2018. Shooting of the series took place in Madrid. Season 2 premiered on 1 April 2019. The broadcasting run ended on 24 October 2020, after 4 seasons and 39 episodes, which feature an approximate running time of 35 minutes.

== Episodes ==
=== Series overview ===
Series	Episodes	Originally released			Ref.
Series	Episodes	First released	Last released	Network	Ref.
1	12	16 September 2018	1 January 2019	Movistar+	
2	10	1 April 2019	3 June 2019	Movistar+	
3	9	12 January 2020	8 March 2020	Movistar+	
4	8	6 September 2020	24 October 2020	Movistar+	

=== Season 1 (2018) ===
The first season follows Eva Vázquez Villanueva, a teenager who spends the summer with her boyfriend, Jorge, and his best friends, Lucas, Hugo, and Dilan. As the school year begins, Eva comes to realize that she has no other friends, besides her boyfriend and Lucas. She doesn't know where to find a group where she feels like herself. The topics covered in Eva's season are mistrust, feminism, cyberbullying, rejection of friends, personal dependency, toxic relationships, and friendship. Season 1 consists of 11 episodes, but also has 1 special episode dedicated to the New Year.

No. overall	No. in season	Title	Duration	Original release date
1	1	"Las raras del instituto (The weirdos of high school)"	28 min	16 September 2018
2	2	"Hay lío (It's a mess)"	21 min	23 September 2018
3	3	"Enséñame tu móvil (Show me your mobile)"	16 min	30 September 2018
4	4	"Verdad o atrevimiento (Truth or dare)"	20 min	7 October 2018
5	5	"¿Y cómo soy? (And how am I?)"	23 min	14 October 2018
6	6	"Siempre Enfadados (Always Mad)"	24 min	21 October 2018
7	7	"Hecha una mierda (All fucked up)"	24 min	27 October 2018
8	8	"La verdad por delante (The truth first)"	24 min	4 November 2018
9	9	"Eva la zorra (Eva is the slut)"	25 min	11 November 2018
10	10	"A nadie le importa (Nobody cares)"	21 min	18 November 2018
11	11	"Fin (The end)"	28 min	25 November 2018
12	12	"Feliz año! (Happy New Year!)"	13 min	1 January 2019

=== Season 2 (2019) ===
The second season focuses on Cristina "Cris" Soto Peña. She meets a mysterious new girl named Joana at Hugo's birthday party, and they quickly form a romantic connection. The arc of this season deals with Cris's inability to deal with serious problems, whether it be with friends, family or a romantic partner. The topics discussed within this season are issues of identity exploration, bisexuality, struggles with parents, and what's like to live with borderline personality disorder. Season 2 has 10 episodes overall.

No. overall	No. in season	Title	Duration	Original release date
13	1	"Éxtasis (Ecstasy)"	31 min	1 April 2019
14	2	"Ojos de sapo (Frog eyes)"	23 min	8 April 2019
15	3	"Perdida (Lost)"	22 min	15 April 2019
16	4	"Deseando nadar (Wishing to swim)"	27 min	22 April 2019
17	5	"Puñetazo (Punch)"	25 min	29 April 2019
18	6	"¿Eres lesbiana? (Are you a lesbian?)"	29 min	6 May 2019
19	7	"Desconocida (Unknown)"	26 min	13 May 2019
20	8	"Cobarde (Coward)"	23 min	20 May 2019
21	9	"No puedo evitarlo (I can't help it)"	27 min	27 May 2019
22	10	"Minuto a minuto (Minute by minute)"	36 min	3 June 2019

=== Season 3 (2020) ===
In a break from tradition with the original Skam, Season 3 has two central protagonists, Nora Grace and Elvira "Viri" Gómez García. After her break up with Alejandro, Nora jumps into a new relationship with her childhood friend Miquel. At first, her new relationship seems to be perfect. But after some time, Miquel turns into a manipulative and controlling boyfriend, and Nora feels stuck in a toxic relationship with him.

Viri is a teenager whose family was affected during the Spanish financial crisis. She tries to help her family financially by finding a job. Viri is also focused on organizing a graduation trip to Mallorca for her class. Throughout the season, she develops a romantic relationship with Hugo, one of Jorge's friends. Season 3 consists of 9 episodes.

No. overall	No. in season	Title	Duration	Original release date
23	1	"Fuckboy"	36 min	12 January 2020
24	2	"No se lo cuentes a nadie (Don't tell anyone)"	32 min	19 January 2020
25	3	"Lo de Viri (Thing about Viri)"	34 min	26 January 2020
26	4	"La persona adecuada, el momento adecuado (The right person, the right moment)"	41 min	2 February 2020
27	5	"El concierto (The concert)"	31 min	9 February 2020
28	6	"¿Qué he hecho? (What have I done?)"	32 min	15 February 2020
29	7	"¿En serio no te acuerdas de nada? (You really don't remember anything?)"	32 min	23 February 2020
30	8	"La Nora que me gustaba (The Nora I liked)"	31 min	1 March 2020
31	9	"¿Existen los finales felices? (Are there happy endings?)"	39 min	8 March 2020

=== Season 4 (2020) ===
Season 4 of Skam España focuses on Amira Naybet, a Muslim teenager growing up in Spain. This season centers on her struggles to balance her religion with her identity, as well as her burgeoning romantic relationship with Dani, Cris' older brother, and a non-Muslim. Topics this season discusses are racism, xenophobia, being Muslim in Spain, and friendship. Due to the coronavirus outbreak, Skam España drops the real-time format; as a result, the events of Season 4 are taking place in April 2020, despite the show airing in September 2020. There are eight episodes overall.

No. overall	No. in season	Title	Duration	Original release date
32	1	"Entre dos mundos (Between the worlds)"	37 min	6 September 2020
33	2	"No llevo el hijab (I'm not wearing a hijab)"	43 min	13 September 2020
34	3	"Seguro que Alá lo entiende (I'm sure Allah understands it)"	45 min	20 September 2020
35	4	"Nunca es por Amira (It's never for Amira)"	37 min	27 September 2020
36	5	"Ramadan kareem"	34 min	4 October 2020
37	6	"La mora del instituto (The high school moor)"	37 min	11 October 2020
38	7	"Ya no sé nada (I don't know anything anymore)"	39 min	18 October 2020
39	8	"Las Losers (The Losers)"	40 min	25 October 2020
