= Irene Ferreiro =

Spanish actress, singer, and author

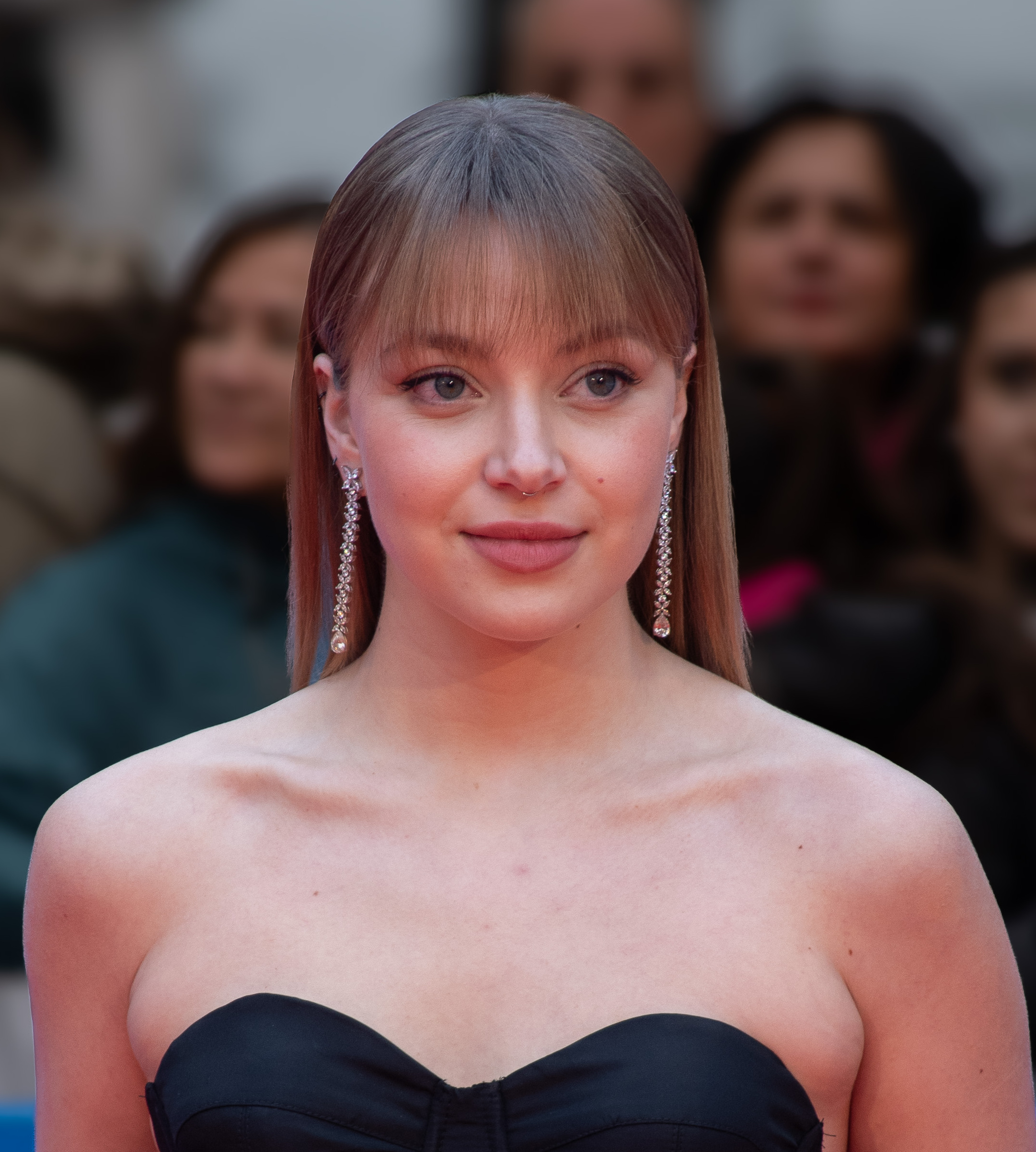
- Ferreiro in 2024
- Born: Irene Ferreiro García; 4 May 2001 (age 25); Madrid, Spain
- Occupations: Actress; singer; author; fashion designer
- Years active: 2018–present
- Notable work: Skam España; Piggy

Irene Ferreiro García (born May 4, 2001) is a Spanish actress, singer, author, and fashion designer, best known for her main roles as Cristina "Cris" Soto Peña in Skam España, the Spanish adaptation of Skam, and as Claudia in the film Piggy, based on the short film of the same name.

== Early life ==
Irene Ferreiro García was born and raised in Madrid, Spain. In Ferreiro's childhood, her mother encouraged her to try many different activities and hobbies. When she turned 12, she began taking acting classes at the Primera Toma school, working her way up to more intensive courses.

== Career ==
=== Acting (2018–present) ===
In 2018, Ferreiro was cast as Cristina "Cris" Soto Peña in the Movistar+ series, Skam España, based on the Norwegian teen series, Skam. The second season of the show centered around her character, Cris, and her growing romantic connection with a mysterious new girl at school named Joana, played by musician Rizha. In a break from the traditional Skam, where a season centers around the romance of two teenage boys, España chose to have the storyline revolve around two teenage girls, and the topics of bisexuality, borderline personality disorder, familial struggles, and dealing with problems and decision-making through Cris, Joana, and their relationship.

For its third season, which centered around the characters of Nora and Viri, two of Cris' best friends, Skam España was awarded the "Cima TV Award for Equality" from the FesTVal de Vitoria for how it promoted themes of feminism and empowerment to a youth audience.

The same year she was cast in Skam España, she also appeared in the short film, Noche de paz, playing the role of Ivan's daughter. The film was directed by Santiago Requejo. In 2019, she starred in the Playz miniseries, Circular, as Blanca Colomina.

In 2022, Ferreiro starred in the horror movie, Piggy, as Claudia, one of the tormentors of the main character who gives her the nickname "Piggy," starring alongside Claudia Salas from the Netflix series, Elite.

In 2023, Ferreiro starred in horror film, The Silence of Marcos Tremmer (El silencio de Marcos Tremmer), as Natalia.

In 2026, Ferreiro is starring in upcoming film, Perfect Liars (Perfectos Mentirosos).

=== Writing (2020) ===
In 2020, the Spanish arm of the Penguin Random House editorial group published a book of poems and illustrations written and drawn by Ferreiro, titled Voces que se ahogaron en el silencio, which translates to Voices drowning in silence in English. The book is described as "a story that tells her vision of feminism, LGBT rights, success, friendships, relationships... An illustrated book that makes the conflicts of the new generation visible."

=== Fashion ventures (2021–present) ===
Ferreiro created her own brand, called KEI Concepts by Irene Ferreiro, in 2021. The brand sells shirts, pants, socks, hats, and purses, among other things. Items can only be bought through their virtual storefront, which is headquartered in Madrid. The brand also has an official Instagram account.

=== Music (2022–present) ===
In 2022, Ferreiro began to release original songs. Between 2022 and 2023 alone, she has released six singles: No Aceleres, Guapo Descarao, Duelo, bonnie&clyde, Fácil, and Millones. The producer for each of her songs is Chickjuarez. Music videos are released via her personal YouTube channel.

== Filmography ==
=== Television ===
Year	Title	Character	Notes
2018–2020	Skam España (Skam Spain)	Cristina "Cris" Soto Peña	Main cast; 39 episodes & central character of season 2
2019	Circular	Blanca Colomina	Main cast; miniseries

=== Film ===
Year	Title	Character	Notes
2018	Noche de paz (Silent Night)	Ivan's daughter	Short film
2022	Piggy (Cerdita)	Claudia	
2024	The Silence of Marcos Tremmer (El Silencio de Marcos Tremmer)	Natalia	
2026	Perfect Liars ( Perfectos Mentirosos)		Post-production

=== Music videos ===
Year	Title	Artist
2017	"Keep On Falling"	Manel Navarro
2019	"Volvimos a Empezar"	VERSOIX
2019	"El Cristal"	VERSOIX
2022	"No Aceleres"	Irene Ferreiro
2022	"Guapo Descarao"	Irene Ferreiro
2022	"Duelo"	Irene Ferreiro
2022	"bonnie&clyde"	Irene Ferreiro
2023	"Fácil"	Irene Ferreiro
2023	"Millones"	Irene Ferreiro

== Discography ==
=== Music ===
Year	Title	Notes
2022	"No Aceleres"	Single
2022	"Guapo Descarao"	Single
2022	"Duelo"	Single
2022	"bonnie&clyde"	Single
2023	"Fácil"	Single
2023	"Millones"	Single

== Bibliography ==
- Voces que se ahogaron en el silencio (Penguin Random House, 2020)
