= Teen Spirit (2018 film) =

- Theatrical release poster
- Directed by: Max Minghella
- Written by: Max Minghella
- Produced by: Fred Berger
- Starring: Elle Fanning; Rebecca Hall; Zlatko Burić
- Cinematography: Autumn Durald
- Edited by: Cam McLauchlin
- Music by: Marius de Vries
- Production companies: Automatik Entertainment; Interscope Films; Blank Tape
- Distributed by: LD Entertainment; Bleecker Street (United States); Lionsgate (United Kingdom)
- Release dates: September 7, 2018 (TIFF); April 12, 2019 (United States); July 26, 2019 (United Kingdom)
- Running time: 92 minutes
- Countries: United States; United Kingdom
- Language: English
- Box office: $1.5 million

Teen Spirit is a 2018 musical drama film written and directed by Max Minghella (in his directorial debut). The film stars Elle Fanning, Rebecca Hall, and Zlatko Burić.

The film had its world premiere at the Toronto International Film Festival on September 7, 2018. It was released in the United States on April 12, 2019, by LD Entertainment and Bleecker Street, and in the United Kingdom on July 26, 2019, by Lionsgate.

== Plot ==
Violet, a shy teenager living in a small village on the Isle of Wight, dreams of pop stardom as an escape from her dismal surroundings and shattered family life. She sings in a near-empty bar without her mother's knowledge. An older man, Vlad, approaches her to say she was good and reveals that he used to be an opera singer in Croatia. Violet doesn't trust him and says she is 21 to discourage his interest.

Later, Violet enters a national singing competition and doesn't tell her mother as she thinks Violet should only sing in church. Violet tries out for Teen Spirit UK alongside many classmates and reaches the next day auditions. She tells the organiser she is 17 and the woman says she'll need to bring a parent or guardian with her tomorrow to give permission for her participation in the competition. She asks Vlad for help and explains she lied about her age to him. He says he'll help but if she wins he will be her manager and take 50% of her earnings. At the next round, she is invited back but must work on her performance and breathing. Vlad says he will train her and they tell her mother.

Her mother is suspicious of Vlad, but agrees to the arrangement, under the condition he received only 15%. In the next round, she fails to advance to the London final and returns home. Her mother sells her horse to cover debts, devastating her. Violet is pursued by a boy from school, Luke, who is in a band. Later, she learns that the heat winner gave a false name and had entered the competition in a previous year, so has been disqualified. As a result, Violet re-joins the competition. She begins singing with Luke's band while Vlad bonds with Violet's mother. As Vlad trains Violet, she learns that he has an estranged daughter living in Paris and encourages him to visit her. In London, the night before the event, a record label executive named Jules offers Violet a record contract, but it must be signed before the final. Vlad is suspicious and says he must read it first. He sees that if Violet signs it, he will be removed from working with her. Violet goes to meet her band friends in a club and ends up kissing Keyan, last year's winner, who she met earlier in Jules' room. Her band mates see she is drunk and try to take Violet back to the hotel. Vlad storms in and carries her out of the club. Angered, Violet says she will sign the contract and Vlad leaves.

The following morning, Violet realises she has lost the gold crucifix her mother gave her. Vlad wakes up on a park bench but returns to the hotel. Jules returns Violet's crucifix to her and again offers her a recording contract. Vlad notices their conversation and leaves the hotel. The competition proceeds with an ensemble song from all the finalists during which Keyan is hostile towards her. Vlad attends and Violet says she didn't sign the contract. The two reconcile before Violet appears on stage for her song. Violet performs her final song, which receives a rapturous applause. She tearfully embraces Vlad backstage, who congratulates her. Some time later, Vlad travels to Paris to meet his daughter, while Violet is on a train with the winner's trophy beside her.

== Cast ==
- Elle Fanning as Violet Valenski
- Zlatko Burić as Vladimir Brajkovic
- Rebecca Hall as Jules
- Agnieszka Grochowska as Marla
- Clara Rugaard as Roxy
- Millie Brady as Anastasia
- Olivia Gray as Lisa
- Ruairi O'Connor as Keyan Spears
- Archie Madekwe as Luke
- Jordan Stephens as Rollo
- Ursula Holliday as Louise
- Rizha as Angel X
- Danny Dyer as TV Dad (cameo)

== Production ==
On January 30, 2017, it was revealed that actor Max Minghella would be making his directorial debut with Teen Spirit from a screenplay that he wrote. It was also revealed that the film would be launched to buyers at the European Film Market in Berlin in the following month. On February 10, 2017, it was announced that Elle Fanning would star in the film, which, at the time, was in pre-production and was being sold to international buyers at the European Film Market. On July 11, 2017, it was announced that principal production for Teen Spirit had commenced in London, England, with the rest of the cast confirmed as well.

In September 2018, a teaser trailer was released, revealing Rebecca Hall as having joined the cast. Additionally, it was announced that the film would feature performances of and music written by Robyn, Ellie Goulding, Ariana Grande, Katy Perry, Tegan & Sara, Annie Lennox, Orbital, Alice Deejay, The Undertones, Major Lazer, Grimes, Whigfield, and Sigrid, and an original song "Wildflowers" written by Carly Rae Jepsen and produced by Jack Antonoff.

== Release ==
Teen Spirit had its world premiere at the Toronto International Film Festival on September 7, 2018. Shortly after, Lionsgate and LD Entertainment acquired British and US distribution rights respectively, with Bleecker Street co-distributing the film in the United States with LD Entertainment. It was released in the United States on April 12, 2019, and in the United Kingdom on July 26, 2019.

== Reception ==
=== Box office ===
After a week of playing in four theaters the film expanded to 696, and grossed $250,536 over the weekend.

=== Critical response ===
On review aggregator Rotten Tomatoes, Teen Spirit holds an approval rating of 71% based on 131 reviews, with an average rating of 6.2/10. The website's critical consensus reads, "Teen Spirit tells a story we know by heart, but writer-director Max Minghella's connection to the material and Elle Fanning's remarkable performance add an effective hook." On Metacritic, the film has a weighted average score of 57 out of 100, based on 24 critics, indicating "mixed or average reviews".

Teen Spirit was selected as a Critic's Pick by The New York Times. Jeannette Catsoulis writes "Max Minghella's sweet and touching directing debut, is both proudly clichéd and refreshingly different."

== Soundtrack ==
The Teen Spirit Original Soundtrack was released on April 5, 2019, by label Interscope Records, features tracks by Elle Fanning, No Doubt, Major Lazer, Grimes, Orbital and an original song written by Carly Rae Jepsen (Wildflowers). The soundtrack's first single "Wildflowers" was released on March 29, 2019, and music video was released on April 5, 2019.

=== Track listing ===
1. Grimes – "Genesis"
2. Elle Fanning – "I Was a Fool"
3. Marius de Vries & Eldad Guetta featuring Elle Fanning – "E.T."
4. No Doubt – "Just a Girl"
5. Elle Fanning – "Dancing on My Own"
6. Elle Fanning – "Lights"
7. Elle Fanning – "Little Bird"
8. Major Lazer featuring MØ & DJ Snake – "Lean On"
9. Elle Fanning & Teen Spirit Finalists – "Good Time"
10. The Shades – "Teenage Kicks"
11. Clara Rugaard – "Tattooed Heart"
12. Elle Fanning – "Don't Kill My Vibe"
13. Orbital featuring Elle Fanning – "Halycon Teen Spirit"
14. Elle Fanning – "Wildflowers"
