= Alba Planas =

Spanish actress

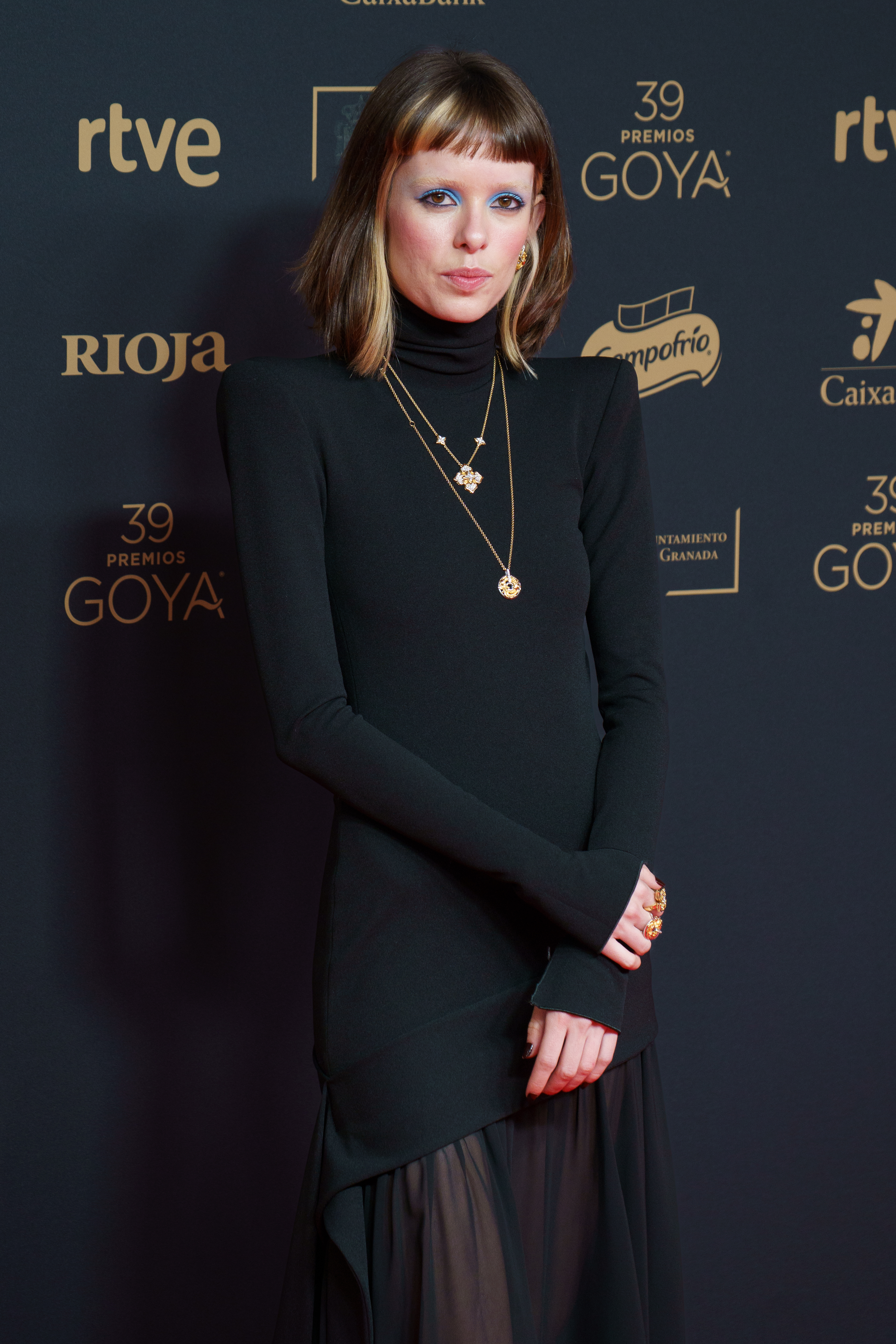
- Planas in 2025
- Born: Alba Planas Menchén; 10 September 2000 (age 24); Madrid, Spain
- Occupation: Actress

Alba Planas Menchén (born 10 September 2000) is a Spanish actress. She portrayed Eva Vázquez Villanueva in the teen drama series Skam España. She made her big screen debut in The Tree of Blood (2018) and portrayed Hildegart Rodríguez in The Red Virgin (2024).

== Early years ==
Alba Planas Menchén was born and raised in Madrid. She began taking acting classes at the age of 7, training in different performing arts schools. Her first steps into the world of acting were small roles in theater and the film El árbol de la sangre, directed by Julio Medem, in which she co-starred with Úrsula Corberó and Álvaro Cervantes. Subsequently, Planas was selected out of a pool of numerous teenagers auditioning to play the lead role of Eva in the first season of Skam España.

Planas can also speak Spanish and English fluently.

== Career ==
Skam España premiered in September 2018, with Planas' character Eva as the central protagonist in the first season of the show. She continued to star in subsequent seasons in a main role until the end of the series in 2020. While appearing as Eva in Skam, she continued to appear in several other short films. For her role in the short film 16, she was given the Best Actress Award by the Official Jury of the Ávilacine Film Festival.

In 2020, she then shot the feature film Por los pelos by Nacho G. Velilla and the series Umbra, filmed in Arnedo. In 2021, she joined the cast of the first original series of Starz Spain's Express, along with Maggie Civantos and Kiti Mánver. In May of the same year, she joined the cast of Prime Video and Mediaset España's Días mejores series, where she plays Graci. Express and Días mejores were then both renewed for second seasons, with Planas continuing on in both her main roles through 2023.

== Filmography ==
=== Television ===
Year	Title	Character	Channel	Notes
2017	Centro médico	Sol	TVE	1 episode
2018–2020	Skam España	Eva Vázquez Villanueva	Movistar+	Main cast; 38 episodes & central character of season 1
2022–2023	Express	Gus Valera Vázquez	Starzplay	Main cast; 16 episodes
2022–2023	Días mejores	Graci	Amazon Prime	Main cast; 18 episodes

=== Cinema ===
Year	Title	Character	Director
2018	El árbol de la sangre	Rebeca (14 años)	Julio Medem
2022	Por los pelos	Aitana	Nacho G. Velilla
2024	La virgen roja	Hildegart	Paula Ortiz
2025	Voy a pasármelo mejor		

=== Short films ===
Year	Title	Character	Director
2018	Canasta	Aurora	Gracia Querejeta
2019	La confianza de mi cabeza entre tus muslos	Lola	Miguel Carreras
2020	16	Laura	Ana Lambarri
