= Villanueva de la Vera =

Coordinates: 40°07′N 5°29′W

Villanueva de la Vera, Spain
- municipality
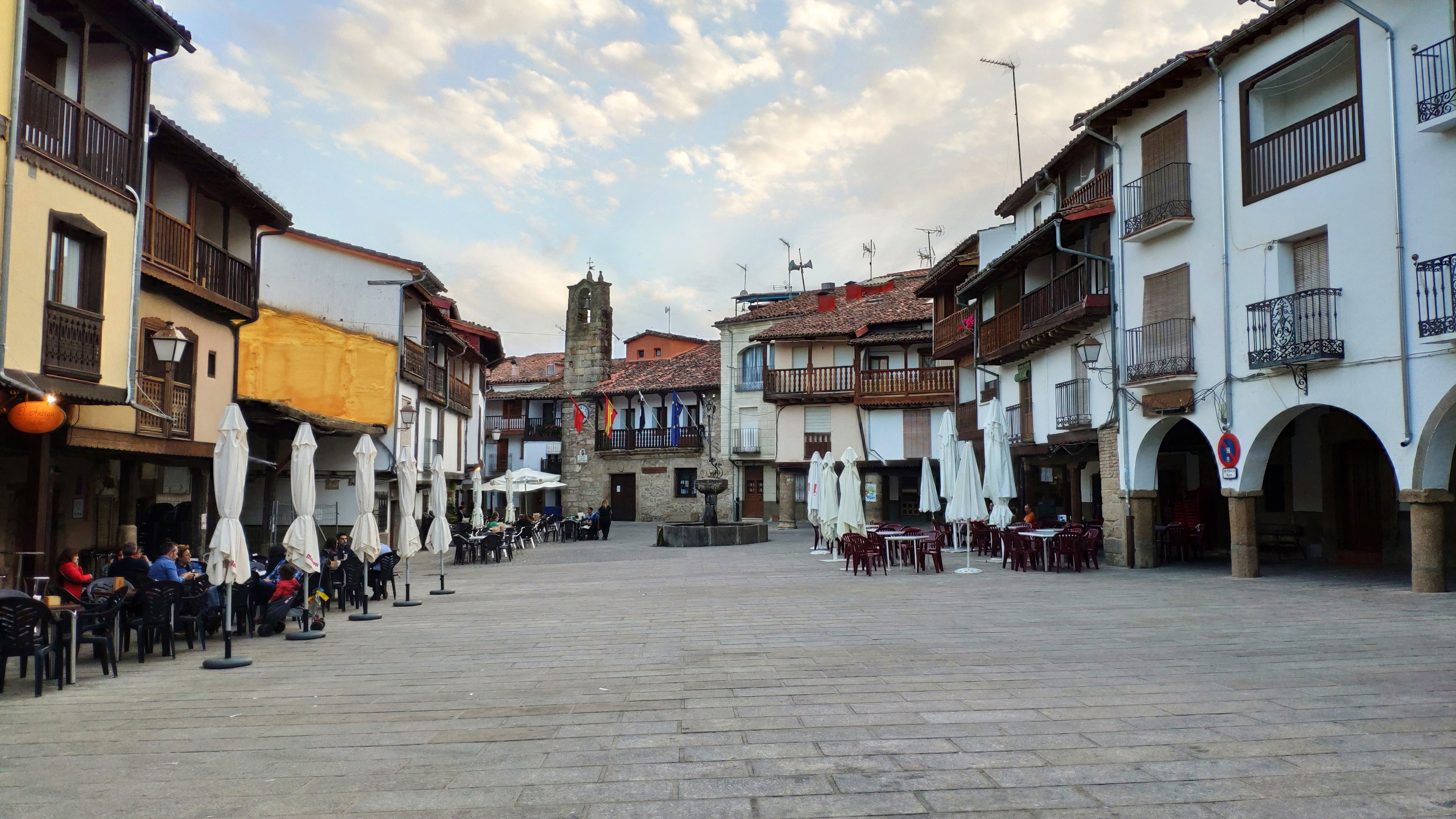
- Town of Villanueva de la Vera in the province of Cáceres

- Flag Coat of arms

- Map of Villanueva de la Vera, Cáceres
- Country: Spain
- Autonomous community: Extremadura
- Province: Cáceres
- Municipality: Villanueva de la Vera

Area
  - Total: 132 km^{2} (51 sq mi)
- Elevation: 498 m (1,634 ft)

Population (2025-01-01)
  - Total: 2,108
  - Density: 16.0/km^{2} (41.4/sq mi)
- Time zone: UTC+1 (CET)
  - Summer (DST): UTC+2 (CEST)

Villanueva de la Vera is a municipality located in the province of Cáceres, Extremadura, Spain. According to the 2005 census (INE), the municipality has a population of 2,163.

== See also ==
- List of municipalities in Cáceres
