= Luz Cipriota =

Argentine actress, dancer and model

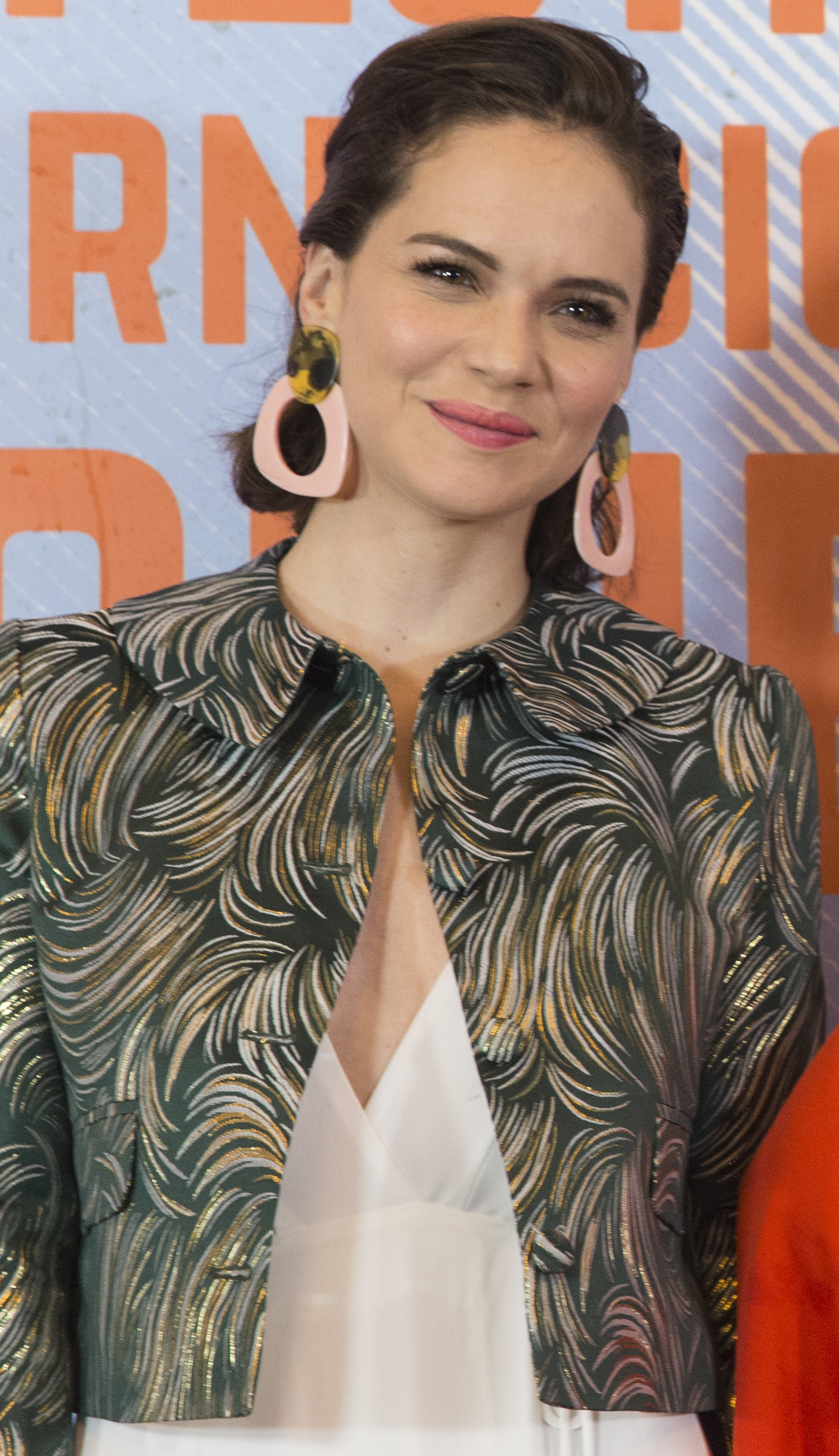
- Born: 6 September 1985 (age 40); Buenos Aires, Argentina
- Occupation: Actress
- Years active: 2006–present

María Luz Cipriota (born 6 September 1985), known professionally as Luz Cipriota, is an Argentine actress, classic dancer and model.

== Career ==
She began her career as a film actress in 2006 starring in the film Deficit, directed by Gael García Bernal in Mexico. That same year she worked on television impersonating Clara in the telenovela El Refugio, later she participated in programs such as Reinas Magas, Almost Angels and Valentino, the Argentine.

In 2009 she starred in the telenovela Herencia de amor, in which she plays Verónica Cabañas.

A year later she participated in the Unitary Life Decisions. In 2012, the RAI chain summoned her to be part of the second season of the Italian miniseries Terra ribelle. During that year and until 2013 he was part of the cast of the telenovela Sos mi hombre. In July of that year, she made a special appearance in the telecomedy The Neighbors at War.

Her film debut took place in 2006 when she starred in Deficit, the first film directed by Gael García Bernal. Later she appeared in films such as No Polo Widow by Blake Mycoskie, Histórias de Amor Duram Barely 90 Minutos by Paulo Halm, Desmadre by Jazmín Stuart and Still Life by Gabriel Grieco.

In 2014 she starred alongside Mariano Torre in the miniseries Coma on Public TV, 6 that same year she had a participation in Tu cara me suena 2. In 2015 she played Jessi in Socios por Accidente 2. In 2016, she played both Tamara in the series Soy Luna as Altea in series 2091, that same year she acted in the Italian film Onda Su Onda where she stars alongside Alessandro Gassmann and Rocco Papaleo speaking in Italian. In 2017, Cipriota played Bianca, Paulina's (Inés Estévez) girlfriend on Channel 13's unit, El Maestro.

In 2018, she joined the third season of Cable Girls, an original series on the Netflix platform. In it she plays the Argentine wife of Uribe, the owner of the telephone company.

== Filmography ==
Television and film roles
Year	Title	Role	Notes
2005	Hombres de honor	Felicitas Matienzo	
2006	El Refugio (de los Sueños)	Clara Mendiazaval	
2007	Casi Ángeles	Brenda Azúcar	
2007	Déficit	Dolores	
2007	Reinas Magas	Gala	
2008–2009	Valentino el argentino	Anahí	
2008	No Polo Widow	Alicia	
2009	Música en espera	Film Woman	
2009–2010	Herencia de amor	Verónica Cabañas	
2009	Historias de amor duram apenas 90 minutos	Carol	
2011	Desmadre	Olimpia	
2011	Decisiones de vida	Virginia	
2016–2017	Soy Luna	Tamara Ríos	Main cast (season 1), 79 episodes Guest (season 2), 2 episodes
2018	Rubirosa	Evita Perón	
2021	Luis Miguel: The Series	Lucía Miranda	Recurring role (season 2); 4 episodes
2022–2024	Elite	Roberta Artiñán	Recurring role (seasons 6–8); 11 episodes

== Theater performances ==
Play
Year	Title
2007	El burdel de París
2008	Reinas magas y el imán de los cuentos
2011	Alegreto
2012	Frustrados en Baires
2013	Más de 100 mentiras
2014	Pegados, el musical
2014	Primeras damas

== Awards and nominations ==
Year	Award	Category	Work	Result
2018	Martin Fierro	Supporting Actress	El maestro	Won
