= Juan of the Dead =

2011 film

- Film poster
- Directed by: Alejandro Brugués
- Written by: Alejandro Brugués
- Produced by: Gervasio Iglesias; Inti Herrera
- Starring: Alexis Díaz de Villegas; Eliécer Ramírez; Andros Perrugorría; Jorge Molina Enríquez; Jazz Vilá; Andrea Duro; Antonio Dechent; Blanca Rosa Blanco; Susana Pous
- Cinematography: Carles Gusi
- Edited by: Mercedes Cantero
- Music by: Sergio Valdés
- Release dates: 10 September 2011 (Toronto); 14 October 2011 (Spain)
- Running time: 96 minutes
- Countries: Spain; Cuba
- Languages: Spanish; English

Juan of the Dead (Spanish: Juan de los Muertos) is a 2011 Spanish-Cuban zombie comedy film written and directed by Alejandro Brugués. A Spanish-Cuban co-production between La Zanfoña Producciones (Spain) and Producciones de la 5ta Avenida (Cuba) involving the participation of the ICAIC, Canal Sur and Televisión Española, the film won the Goya Award for Best Spanish Language Foreign Film in 2012.

== Plot ==
Juan, a lazy man in his forties, lives a carefree life in Cuba with his equally lazy and accident-prone sidekick, Lazaro. While out fishing, they accidentally catch what they believe to be a corpse. To their surprise, the "corpse" awakens and attacks them. Lazaro kills it with a spear gun, but they dismiss it as a strange incident. Juan and Lazaro engage in thuggish activities and associate with their questionable friends, including Lazaro's son Vladi California, drag queen La China, and China's lover Primo.

Unexplained acts of violence suddenly plague the city, with people attacking each other randomly. Juan suspects that vampires or demons are behind the chaos, not capitalist dissidents. Juan and Lazaro encounter reanimated bodies, leading Juan to start a business called "Juan of the Dead" where they kill and dispose of the zombified residents for a fee. Their indoor missions result in high casualties and reveal their corrupt nature, straining Juan's relationship with his daughter, Camila.

A shady military group captures Juan's group and forces them into a truck, supposedly as part of a campaign to recruit able-bodied men to fight the zombies. Chaos erupts when infected individuals reanimate, causing the truck to crash. Juan's group escapes, but China, who was bitten, dies and turns into a zombie while handcuffed to Juan. Camila and Vladi work to free Juan, eventually succeeding. With the increasing number of zombies, the group takes refuge on rooftops, relying on Vladi's solo food retrieval missions.

Desperate for safety, the dwindling group, consisting of Juan, Lazaro, Primo, Vladi, and Camila (who have become romantically involved), decides to head for the mountains. Their attempt to escape in a vehicle fails, forcing them to flee on foot while being pursued by hundreds of zombies. Seeking shelter in a bunker, they discover it is overrun, and Primo is killed. They find temporary safety in a parking garage suggested by a middle-aged man with a harpoon gun mounted on his truck, who hints at a religious solution but is accidentally killed by Lazaro.

Sheltering in the parking garage, Lazaro devises a plan to construct a flotation mechanism using oil drums and attach them to a convertible. Their goal is to drive through a group of zombies and reach the beach, where they plan to float to Florida in hopes of finding safety. Lazaro confesses that he was bitten earlier, but it turns out to be a harmless scratch. Juan and Lazaro fight off the zombies to create a path for the car. Juan rescues a crying child and brings him to the car. They build a ramp of bodies for the car to jump over the wall and make it into the water.

As they prepare to float to freedom, Juan surprises his companions by getting out of the car and heading back to shore. He believes he belongs in his homeland and plans to continue surviving. In an animated cartoon during the end credits, Juan is shown fighting through the zombie horde. Later, it is revealed that Camila, Lazaro, and Vladi have joined Juan in his fight against the undead.

== Release ==
Juan of the Dead was a $3 million Cuban-Spanish co-production making it the most expensive privately-financed movie in Cuba. It was also the first Cuban independent film to receive state approval.

The film was first shown at the 2011 Toronto International Film Festival. Focus Features released the film on 14 August via iVOD and VOD, along with DVD and Blu-ray Disc. It was marketed as Cuba's first zombie film.

== Reception ==
Total Film gave the film three stars out of five, noting the film's "jaunty tone bristling uneasily with often unlikeable heroes" but praised its political context, stating that the film "resurrects the genre's political subtexts with jibes at a country where zombies are dismissed as 'dissidents' and public transport continues to run, no matter what."

As of October 2020, the film has 83% on Rotten Tomatoes based on 23 reviews. The site's critics consensus reads, "Filled with wild splatter slapstick, Juan of the Dead also deftly uses its zombie premise as an undead Trojan horse for insightful political commentary."

== Analysis ==
The film's title draws influence from the genre classic George A. Romero's Dawn of the Dead.

Academic Carlos Rojas observes that the zombies in Juan of the Dead both mirror the dilapidation of contemporary Havana and the inexorability of global capitalism. Noting that the film shows Cuban authorities denying the existence of the zombies and insisting that they are dissidents hired by the United States to further destabilize Cuba, Rojas concludes that the zombies "are imagined in the film as a symbolic manifestation of both a Communist legacy and the capitalist forces against which communism is theoretically opposed, while simultaneously articulating an ironic critique of U.S. attempts to foment dissent within Cuba as well as of Cuba's paranoia about U.S. intervention."

== Cast ==
- Alexis Díaz de Villegas as Juan
- Jorge Molina as Lazaro
- Andrea Duro as Camila
- Andros Perugorría as Vladi California
- Jazz Vilá as La China
- Eliecer Ramírez as El Primo
- Antonio Dechent as Father Jones
- Blanca Rosa Blanco as Sara
- Elsa Camp as Yiya
- Susana Pous as Lucía
- Eslinda Núñez as Leader of CDR Meeting
- Juan Miguel Mas as President of the CDR
- Manuel Herrera as TV Announcer
- Luis Alberto García as Padre
