= Alejandro Brugués =

Argentine-Cuban director and writer

- Born: Buenos Aires, Argentina
- Occupation: Film director
- Known for: Juan of the Dead; Pooka Lives!

Alejandro Brugués is an Argentinian-Cuban director and writer known for directing Juan of the Dead, which has been credited as Cuba's first zombie movie.

== Biography ==
Brugués received his education at San Antonio de los Baños School and made his directorial debut with the 2006 film Personal Belongings, which he filmed in Cuba. He followed this up with Juan of the Dead, the which has been credited as the first zombie movie to be filmed in Cuba. Brugués later moved to Los Angeles, California around 2014, during which time he was approached to direct a segment for ABCs of Death 2.

In 2016 Brugués announced his intent to film a television series for Starz, Santeria. The series, which was to be filmed in Cuba, was met with criticism by Yoruba National Association, which felt that the Santeria practitioners were being portrayed in a negative light. The series was placed on hold while the story was rewritten to take place in Florida, and it was eventually released as part of Quibi's 50 States of Fright, "Destino".

In April 2021, it was reported that Alejandro Brugués was set to direct The Last Will and Testament of Charles Abernathy, which was to be produced and distributed by Netflix. Principal photography began on April 12, 2021 and concluded on June 25, 2021 in Victoria, British Columbia. In January 2023, it was announced that Netflix had dropped the completed film, now titled The Inheritance, and that it would be shopped to other distributors.

== Filmography ==
=== Films ===
- Personal Belongings (2006)
- Juan of the Dead (2011)
- ABCs of Death 2 (2014, segment "E is for Equilibrium")
- Nightmare Cinema (2018, segment "The Thing in the Woods")
- Satanic Hispanics (2022, segment "The Hammer of Zanzibar")
- The Inheritance (2024)

=== Television ===
- From Dusk till Dawn: The Series (2015-2016, 2 episodes)
- Into the Dark (2020, season 2, episode 7, "Pooka Lives!")
- 50 States of Fright (2020, "Destino (Florida)" comprising episodes 12-14 of season 1)
