= Pooka! =

- Into the Dark episode
- Episode no.: Season 1 Episode 3
- Directed by: Nacho Vigalondo
- Written by: Gerald W. Olson
- Cinematography by: Scott Winig
- Editing by: Andrew Wesman
- Original air date: December 7, 2018
- Running time: 83 minutes

Guest appearances
- Nyasha Hatendi as Wilson Clowes; Latarsha Rose as Melanie; Jon Daly as Finn; Dale Dickey as Red; Jonny Berryman as Ty; Bryan Billy Boone as Diner Dad; Caden Dragomer as Pooka Shop Boy; Alex Jayne Go as Pooka Shop Girl; Nicholas Sean Johnny as Older Kid; Diane Sellers as Casting Director; Cliff Weissman as Detective; Katie Wilson as Reporter

Episode chronology
← Previous "Flesh & Blood"	Next → "New Year, New You"

"Pooka!" is an episode of American horror anthology web television series Into the Dark that aired as the third episode of the show's first season. It originally premiered in the United States on December 7, 2018, on Hulu. The episode was directed by Nacho Vigalondo from a script written by Gerald Olson and stars Nyasha Hatendi, Latarsha Rose, Jon Daly, Dale Dickey, and Jonny Berryman.

== Plot ==
Unemployed actor Wilson Clowes (Nyasha Hatendi), moves into a new apartment building to start a new life, befriending a fellow resident, an older woman named Red (Dale Dickey). He finds a vague audition announcement in a coffee shop and attends. After an unusual physical component, Wilson is offered the acting job by Finn (Jon Daly), the advertising director for a new Christmas toy called Pooka. A stuffed animal with large eyes, Pooka selectively repeats what it hears in either a "naughty" or "nice" voice, and Wilson's job will be to portray Pooka in a large, furry costume in both advertisements and live appearances. Wilson is informed that he will be the sole actor portraying Pooka. He accepts after realizing how much he will be paid.

Wilson's portrayal of Pooka coincides with the toy's skyrocketing popularity. However, the costume begins having strange side effects on the actor. When wearing the costume in "naughty" mode, Wilson is prone to violent outbursts and hallucinations and will have no recollection of them afterwards. Meanwhile, Finn gets Wilson the business card of Melanie (Latarsha Rose), a real estate agent to whom he has become attracted after seeing her first at a Christmas tree farm, then at one of his in-store events. Wilson attends an open house showing put on by Melanie, and the two hit it off and date. Wilson buys Melanie's son Ty (Jonny Berryman) a Pooka toy, much to the boy's pleasure. They go to the Christmas tree lot and pick one out together and later put it up in Melanie's house.

Wilson's hallucinations continue, and he has a vision of himself as naughty Pooka entering Red's apartment and killing her. However, when he visits her apartment, she appears unharmed, and as they talk, Wilson remembers that he made his life change to get away from some sort of pain that he thinks he caused. Wilson offers to have Pooka appear at Ty's birthday party, and he appears in costume. The lack of Ty's father-figure at the party causes one of the older kids to point this out to Ty, and comments that everyone knows why his father isn't there. This triggers Wilson into naughty Pooka, and we see the room turns red from Pooka's eyes. He then attacks the child in front of Ty, causing him to be frightened. Melanie still has no idea that Wilson is Pooka, who is upset that the guy in the Pooka costume would attack a child and later discusses it with Wilson. Wilson seems to not acknowledge that it was him in the costume, and takes Melanie's concern as blame and gets very angry. He then sees that the tree that they had gotten with Ty is gone, and accuses Melanie of not trusting him. Melanie does not know what tree he is talking about, it is implied there never was one. She demands that Wilson leave.

The Pooka toy suffers a widespread malfunction and technical errors, causing all the toys to repeat only the distorted phrase in Pooka's naughty voice: "Look at all the pretty lights." Pooka's popularity plummets and Wilson is let go from his job. During an encounter in a bar, however, Finn tells Wilson that there never was a Pooka, and Wilson realizes the bar he's in is actually empty. As all this occurs, the costume appears to be inseparable from Wilson, who is seen visibly hyperventilating until he puts the Pooka head on. With the Pooka costume on, he goes to Melanie's house and leaves a box with a Pooka toy which is relaying an apology for his outburst. Melanie is disturbed and out the window sees Pooka watching from across the street. A pedestrian then gets into a fight with Wilson, and takes the Pooka head, exposing Wilson as Pooka to Melanie.

Wilson's hallucinations worsen. One night, he arrives at his apartment building to find that Red has fallen to her death. The onlookers and investigators imply it was an accidental death due to Red being drunk, but suspecting the sentient Pooka which Wilson has been hallucinating, he goes up to Red's apartment and finds Pooka coated in gasoline and with fire in its eyes. Afraid that Pooka will now go after Melanie and Ty, Wilson calls Melanie to warn that they are in danger, but Ty picks up and quickly dismisses Wilson by saying they have to go to the Christmas tree farm to get a new tree. Wilson goes to the farm and finds the sentient Pooka costume, which he attacks with an ax and seemingly kills. When he goes to Melanie's house, she no longer appears to be living there, and when he goes to the open house home where they first met, he sees the truth about his past. Wilson and Melanie were, in fact, husband and wife and lived in the open house. Wilson in the Pooka costume watched as past-Wilson, prone to violent outbursts, destroys the Christmas Tree and breaking it in half while Ty watches from the doorway. Past-Wilson pleads with Melanie and Ty to go to the tree lot and get a new tree with him, causing Pooka-Wilson to plead to past Melanie to not listen to his past self as he watches the final scene play out, but she cannot hear him.

In the closing scene, Pooka-Wilson witnesses his past self trying to make up for his violence by driving Melanie and Ty to a Christmas tree farm. During the drive, Melanie attempts to distract Ty from Wilson's frantic driving by remarking "look at all the pretty lights," but Wilson, looking in the rear-view mirror at Melanie and Ty, crashes head-on into another car. He is thrown from the vehicle, and Melanie and Ty are killed when it explodes. The driver of the other car was Red, who was killed in the crash. Pooka-Wilson and the sentient Pooka suit now seated in the empty bar, watch sadly as the version of Wilson who was driving the car is taken away by paramedics, one of which is Finn, and the distorted voice of Ty's Pooka toy repeats the phrase "look at all the pretty lights."

== Production ==
=== Development ===
On October 11, 2018, production designer Cecil Gentry revealed in an interview with Dead Entertainment that he was working on ten out of twelve episodes of Into the Dark and that an episode centered on Christmas titled "Pooka" would air in December.

=== Casting ===
On November 12, 2018, it was announced that the episode would star Nyasha Hatendi.

== Release ==
On November 26, 2018, a trailer for the episode "Pooka!" was released. On December 6, 2018, a clip from "Pooka!" was released.

== Reception ==
The episode was met with a positive response from critics upon its premiere. On the review aggregation website Rotten Tomatoes, the episode holds a 75% approval rating with an average rating of 6.11 out of 10 based on 8 reviews.

In a positive review, Bloody Disgusting's Daniel Kurl praised the episode saying, "More than anything, "Pooka!" will definitely be one of the most unique pieces of Christmas horror that you'll see this year. It doesn't take the same bait that other stories do and it's a creative, ambitious endeavor that deserves to be seen." In a similarly favorable analysis, Laughing Place's Mike Mack commended the episode declaring, "The plot of this episode is so perfectly dark and twisted, the cast is fantastic and Pooka himself is the perfect mix of everything this series is going for. If you're looking for something creepy to watch this holiday season, look no further than "Pooka!"." In his review for The Daily Dot, Eddie Strait awarded the episode 3 out of 5 stars and said that it was, "a solid entry for Into the Dark. Not all of the creative choices pay off, but there are enough indelible images that you'll remember "Pooka!", perhaps longer than you'd like. A movie this weird is the exact kind of thing you would expect to find on streaming sites, and that's perhaps the strongest feather in Into the Dark's cap. The show gives you want you want, and something you weren't expecting." In another acclamatory critique, Paste's Jacob Oller gave the episode a rating of 7.9 out of 10 and complimented it saying, "While it's not especially tight—even when the cuts, transitions, and timelines are vague and strange on purpose—and opts for a few stilted narrative shortcuts, "Pooka!" is certainly the first time Into the Dark has filled up its tank with genuine nightmare fuel." Writing for /Film, Matt Donato gave the episode a rating of 7 out of 10 and said of it, "Not the conventional Christmas nightmare one might expect, but sharpened enough to expose purposefully provocative seasonal traumas regarding control, regret, and the psychological toll holidays can take on those still nursing open wounds – self-inflicted or otherwise." While Paste magazine said, ""“Pooka!" is certainly the first time Into the Dark has filled up its tank with genuine nightmare fuel."

In a more mixed assessment, RogerEbert.com's Brian Tallerico gave the episode a rating of 2 ½ stars out of 4 and said, "While I admire its ambition, "Pooka!" kind of wears out its welcome before it's over." He added however that, "Still, there's artistry at work in "Pooka!" that was lacking in the first two films, and the series is heading in the right direction, earning a half-star more from me with each release. At this rate, they'll be making masterpieces by Easter." In an outright negative appraisal, Film School Rejects' Rob Hunter criticized the episode saying, "The film's overly surreal nature also makes it too clear where things are heading. We might not know the specifics, but regular viewers of genre fare will see the third act coming many miles away. Again, it's stretched out to a length beyond what the narrative can handle — it would have made for a killer episode of Monsters (1988-1990) — and threatens to leave viewers dancing between expectation and frustration. They'll know what's coming and wish it was there sooner." In a separate unfavorable evaluation, Bleeding Cool's Jeremy Konrad was very critical of the episode saying that, "This was a frustrating watch from beginning to end and the payoff was not worth it. While a step up visually, this is going to end up being one of the weaker entries in the series. The nice thing about anthologies though is that there is always the next one."

== Sequel ==
A sequel to Pooka! aired as part of season two of Into the Dark on April 3, 2020 called Pooka Lives! The story is about a bunch of friends (portrayed by Felicia Day, Malcolm Barrett, Jonah Ray, and Lyndie Greenwood) who knew each other from high school create their own holiday and an internet meme revolving around the toy Pooka, the history of its creation, as well as an urban legend revolving around the homicide of its creator (portrayed by Rachel Bloom) who was fired from the toy company that she worked at. When the Pooka Challenge goes viral on the internet, events turn into a living nightmare as murderous versions of Pooka come to life. Unlike the first one, the sequel has a more comedic and slightly action oriented tone.

== See also ==
- Stories Untold, a video game with a similar twist ending
- The 12 Days of Christine, the second episode in the second season of the British black comedy anthology series Inside No. 9 with similar plot points and twist ending
