= Nightmare Cinema =

2018 American horror anthology film

- Theatrical release poster
- Directed by: Alejandro Brugués; Joe Dante; Mick Garris; Ryuhei Kitamura; David Slade
- Written by: Sandra Becerril; Alejandro Brugués; Lawrence C. Connolly; Mick Garris; Richard Christian Matheson; David Slade
- Produced by: Mark Canton; Mick Garris; Joe Russo; Courtney Solomon
- Starring: Mickey Rourke; Richard Chamberlain; Patrick Wilson; Eric Nelsen; Mariela Garriga; Elizabeth Reaser; Sarah Withers; Adam Godley; Ezra Buzzington; Stephanie Cood; Annabeth Gish; Faly Rakotohavana
- Cinematography: Andrew Russo; Matthias Schubert; Jo Willems
- Edited by: Tony Kearns; Mike Mendez
- Production companies: Cinelou Films; Cranked Up; Nice Guy Productions
- Distributed by: Cranked Up Films
- Release dates: July 13, 2018 (Fantasia); June 21, 2019 (U.S.)
- Running time: 119 minutes
- Country: United States

Nightmare Cinema is a 2018 American horror anthology film. It comprises five segments and a wraparound, directed by Alejandro Brugués, Joe Dante, Mick Garris, Ryūhei Kitamura, and David Slade. The cast features Mickey Rourke, Richard Chamberlain (in his final film role), Patrick Wilson, Eric Nelsen, Elizabeth Reaser, Adam Godley, Ezra Buzzington and Annabeth Gish.

The film premiered at the 2018 Fantasia International Film Festival. It received a limited theatrical release in the United States, before being releasing on streaming services. This marks the final film role for Chamberlain before his death in March 2025.

== Plot ==
The film comprises five segments and a wraparound, The Projectionist (D: Mick Garris). Five strangers converge at a haunted movie theater owned by The Projectionist (Mickey Rourke). Once inside, the audience members witness a series of screenings that shows them their deepest fears and darkest secrets over five tales.

- The Thing in the Woods (D: Alejandro Brugués), a postmodern sendup of slasher thrillers, involving a killer who is not what he seems. Starring Eric Nelsen, Sarah Withers, Kevin Fonteyne, and Chris Warren.
- Mirari (D: Joe Dante), a woman with facial scars seeks plastic surgery at a sinister clinic. Starring Richard Chamberlain, Zarah Mahler, Mark Grossman, and Belinda Balaski.
- Mashit (D: Ryūhei Kitamura), Catholic schoolgirls become possessed by a demon of child-suicide. Starring Maurice Benard, Stephanie Cood, Calista Bess, and Mariela Garriga.
- This Way to Egress (D: David Slade), a woman waiting for a doctor's appointment experiences disturbing shifts in reality. Starring Elizabeth Reaser, Adam Godley, Ezra Buzzington, Bronwyn Merrill, and Patrick Wilson.
- Dead (D: Mick Garris), an adolescent piano prodigy dies, is revived, and is under attack from supernatural forces. Starring Faly Rakotohavana, Annabeth Gish, Daryl C. Brown, Lexy Panterra, and Orson Chaplin.

== Production ==
The project was announced in September 2017 with the five directors attached and Rourke as the storyteller. Filming took place in the United States in November and December 2017.

== Release ==
The film had its world premiere at the Fantasia International Film Festival in Canada on July 13, 2018. It received a limited release in the United States on June 21, 2019.

== Reception ==
At its premiere at the Fantasia International Film Festival, Nightmare Cinema was praised for its eclectic anthology format. Critics highlighted David Slade's segment This Way to Egress as a standout for its surreal black-and-white style.

=== Critical response ===
On review aggregator Rotten Tomatoes, Nightmare Cinema holds an approval rating of 77%, based on 44 reviews, and an average rating of 6.2/10. Its consensus reads, "Admirably eclectic yet more consistent than most horror anthologies, Nightmare Cinema should entertain viewers in the mood for a good old-fashioned creepshow." On Metacritic, the film has a weighted average score of 59 out of 100, based on eight critics, indicating "mixed or average reviews."

Dennis Harvey, writing for Variety, gave the film a favorable review and called it an "uneven but fun compendium of scare tales."

RogerEbert.com's Nick Allen provided a mixed review, praising certain segments for their creativity and execution but criticizing others for lacking coherence and impact. He noted that the film offers a little something for every type of horror fan, but it can be a bit of a mess.

Noel Murray from the Los Angeles Times also gave a mixed review, appreciating the anthology format and the nostalgic appeal but mentioning that some segments work better than others, leading to an uneven overall experience.
