= Shaunette Renée Wilson =

American actress (born 1990)

- Born: January 19, 1990 (age 36); Linden, Guyana
- Occupation: Actress
- Years active: 2017–present

Shaunette Renée Wilson (born January 19, 1990) is a Guyanese actress. She is best known for four seasons in the role of Dr. Mina Okafor in The Resident (2018–2021). She has also appeared in Billions (2017), Black Panther (2018), and Indiana Jones and the Dial of Destiny (2023).

== Early life and education ==
Shaunette Renée Wilson was born in Guyana and raised in New York City from the age of two. She is the daughter of Deberah and Wesley Wilson, and she has three siblings: brother Andre and sisters Serena and Synique.

Wilson attended the Yale School of Drama, where she earned her MFA degree in 2016. Her Yale credits include Cardboard Piano, Paradise Lost, The Seagull, and The Children. Wilson received her BA in Drama and Theater from Queens College.

== Filmography ==
=== Film ===
| Year | Title | Role | Notes |
|---|---|---|---|
| 2018 | A Kid Like Jake | Dream Mom | Uncredited |
| 2018 | Black Panther | Dora Milaje (1992) | |
| 2023 | Indiana Jones and the Dial of Destiny | Agent Mason | |
| 2024 | The Luckiest Man in America | Donna | |
| 2025 | BLKNWS: Terms & Conditions | | |
| 2025 | Karate Kid: Legends | Ms. Morgan | |
| 2025 | Queens of the Dead | Tiger | |
| 2027 | The 99'ers | Briana Scurry | Filming |

=== Television ===
| Year | Title | Role | Notes |
|---|---|---|---|
| 2017 | Billions | Stephanie Reed | 7 episodes |
| 2018–2021 | The Resident | Dr. Mina Okafor | Main cast (seasons 1–4) |
| 2019 | Into the Dark | Marie | Episode: "Treehouse" |
| 2025 | Washington Black | Big Kit | |
