= Being Mary Jane =

American drama television series

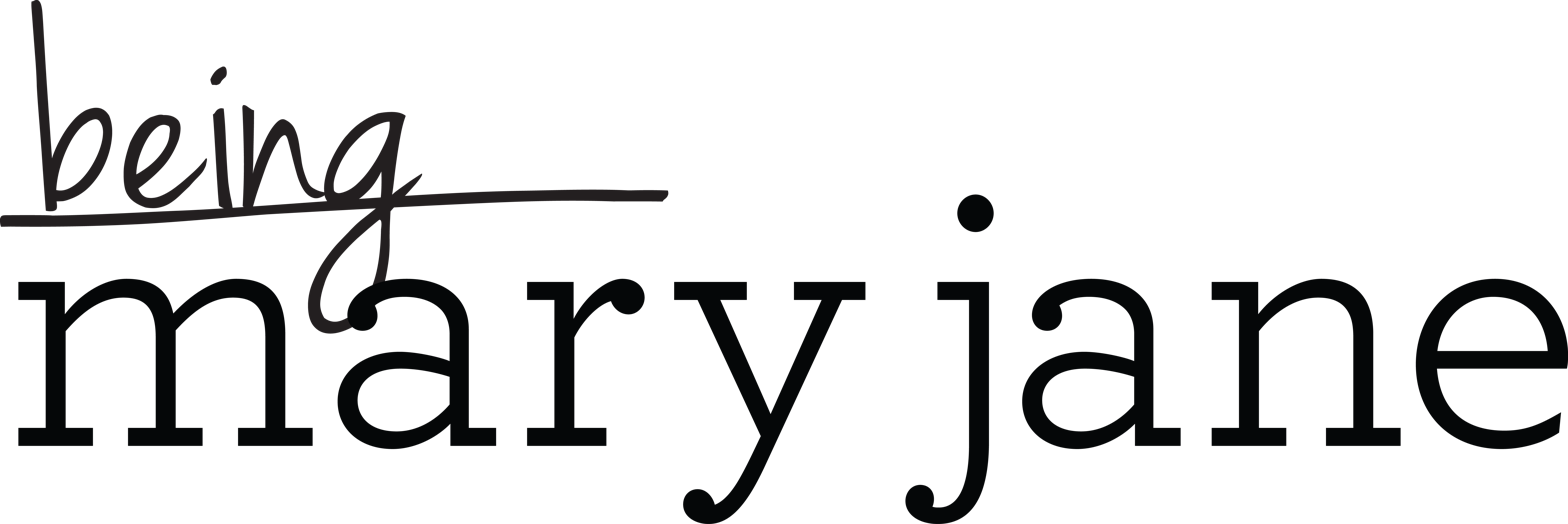
- Genre: Drama
- Created by: Mara Brock Akil
- Starring: Gabrielle Union; Lisa Vidal; Michael Ealy; Margaret Avery; Omari Hardwick; Richard Brooks; B. J. Britt; Latarsha Rose; Raven Goodwin; Aaron D. Spears; Richard Roundtree; Stephen Bishop; Morris Chestnut
- Composer: Kurt Farquhar
- Country of origin: United States
- Original language: English
- No. of seasons: 4
- No. of episodes: 52 (list of episodes)

Production
- Executive producers: Mara Brock Akil; Salim Akil; Gabrielle Union
- Production location: Georgia
- Running time: 61 minutes (pilot); 42 minutes; 120 minutes (finale)
- Production companies: Akil Productions; Breakdown Productions; Season 4 and finale: Schoolcraft Productions; Will Packer Productions

Original release
- Network: BET
- Release: July 2, 2013 – September 19, 2017
- Release: April 23, 2019

Being Mary Jane is an American drama television series created by Mara Brock Akil and starring Gabrielle Union. The pilot aired on July 2, 2013, as an hour-long television film across a 90-minute timeslot, before resuming as a weekly series on January 7, 2014, on BET. The series follows the professional and personal life of successful TV news anchor Mary Jane Paul, who lives in Atlanta and New York City.

Being Mary Jane received positive reviews from critics. It debuted as BET's highest-rated series premiere with four million viewers. On January 6, 2016, the series was renewed for a fourth season, which premiered on January 10, 2017. It was announced on October 11, 2017, that the series would end. A two-hour television film finale was planned to air in 2018 but never came to fruition. On December 7, 2018, BET announced that the finale had been pushed back to air on April 16, 2019. On April 1, 2019, it was announced that the TV film finale date was pushed back to April 23.

== List of episodes ==
Season	Episodes		Originally released	
Season	Episodes		First released	Last released
1	9	TV film	July 2, 2013	
1	9	8	January 7, 2014	February 25, 2014
2	12		February 3, 2015	April 14, 2015
3	10		October 20, 2015	December 15, 2015
4	20	10	January 10, 2017	March 21, 2017
4	20	10	July 18, 2017	September 19, 2017
TV film			April 23, 2019	

=== Season 1 (2013–14) ===
No. overall	No. in season	Title	Directed by	Written by	Original release date	U.S. viewers (millions)
1	1	"Pilot"	Salim Akil	Mara Brock Akil	July 2, 2013	4.01
The story and life of a black woman, her work, and her family as well as her popular talk show, which she hosts. It is about how a woman takes care of her whole family while struggling with herself mentally. She is conflicted about her love life, wanting to get pregnant, taking care of her niece who is pregnant for the fourth time. She discovers that the man she has been seeing is married and end things with him. At the end, she decides to sleep with her ex referring to it as a "booty call" only but steals his sperm to save it for future.
2	2	"Storm Advisory"	Salim Akil	Jessica Mecklenburg	January 7, 2014	3.32
While spending time with David, Andre surprises Mary Jane at her home. Meanwhile, an anchor at the station is fired, placing the careers of Mary Jane, Kara, and Mark in jeopardy.
3	3	"Girls Night In"	Salim Akil	Mara Brock Akil	January 14, 2014	2.77
The affair between Mary Jane and Andre develops a strain on his marriage. Mary Jane ponders about her future—and if it should include Andre. Meanwhile, Kara, and Mary Jane are faced with creative differences when Kara decides to revamp Mark's show. A woman from Paul Sr.'s past makes an attempt to move in on him after learning about Helen's health condition. Guest stars: Lesley-Ann Brandt, Sheila Frazier, Brely Evans
4	4	"The Huxtables Have Fallen"	Salim Akil	Devon Greggory	January 21, 2014	2.58
Patrick learns of Mary Jane's affair with Andre. To help her sort through her dilemma, Patrick takes her to visit their voice-of-reason Aunt Toni. She is once again conflicted about her feelings for Andre and decides to once and for all give him an answer in regard to his marriage proposal. Meanwhile, a former business partner declines further partnership with Patrick, resulting in damaging effects to Patrick's sobriety. Guest stars: Kelly Rutherford, Lorraine Toussaint, Darrin Dewitt Henson
5	5	"Mixed Messages"	Salim Akil	Erica L. Anderson	February 4, 2014	2.69
Andre slips up and reveals that he is still being intimate with his wife, Avery. To even the score, Mary Jane decides to go out on a date with a man she met online. Kara's changes at SNC prove to be over the top for Mark. Meanwhile, Helen misplaces her diamond bracelet in an effort to get Patrick's girlfriend out of the house. Guest stars: Wayne Brady
6	6	"Exposed"	Salim AKil	Erika Graham	February 11, 2014	2.47
Mary Jane and Andre have decided to settle in together at her home in domestic bliss. Meanwhile, Helen is disappointed with Paul Sr. for not receiving a platinum table at an exclusive gala, so he finds an unlikely source in hopes of obtaining one. While Andre declines his invitation to accompany Mary Jane at the gala, she unexpectedly runs into her ex, David. Also, Mary Jane is faced with a challenging decision at SNC involving a fellow journalist. Guest star: Chris "Ludacris" Bridges
7	7	"Hindsight is 20/40"	Salim Akil	Erica L. Anderson	February 18, 2014	2.92
Mary Jane and Andre argue over whether Mary Jane is still involved with David or not, once Andre reveals a picture of the two together. Meanwhile, Paul Sr. gives Patrick an ultimatum as his son decides that he will be moving out soon. Kara is faced with a custody issue involving her sons. Also, P.J. lands himself in trouble once again, and Niecy announces her plans following her delivery. Guest star: Dorian Missick
8	8	"Blindsided"	Salim Akil	Jessica Mecklenburg and Erika Graham	February 25, 2014	2.58
Unsettling news of a fellow journalist's suicide unnerves Mary Jane, who lands in the middle of a scandal. Meanwhile, Niecy grows concerned that the father of her unborn child will not be present for the birth of their baby. Patrick is worried about Helen's well-being now that he has moved out of the house. Guest stars: Ava DuVernay, Keith Boykin
9	9	"Uber Love"	Salim Akil	Mara Brock Akil	February 25, 2014	3.23
Mary Jane decides to right all the wrongs of the people she has hurt. Meanwhile, Lisa and Mary Jane's friendship is put to the test.

=== Season 2 (2015) ===
No. overall	No. in season	Title	Directed by	Written by	Original release date	U.S. viewers (millions)
10	1	"People In Glass Houses Shouldn't Throw Fish"	Salim Akil	Mara Brock Akil	February 3, 2015	2.37
With Andre and David no longer an active part in her life, Mary Jane recommits herself to work, family and friends; David's new girlfriend is pregnant. Guest Starring: Salli Richardson
11	2	"Freedom"	Salim Akil	Laurence Andries	February 10, 2015	2.07
Mary Jane vows to carve out an anxiety-free weekend, but plans go awry when Mark calls asking her to be his "beard" during the unexpected arrival of his parents. Revelations during their visit force Mark to make a change. Guest Starring: Greg Alan Williams, S. Epatha Merkerson
12	3	"Mary Jane Knows Best"	Regina King	Story by : Mara Brock Akil and Erica L. Anderson; Teleplay by : Erica L. Anderson	February 17, 2015	2.46
Mary Jane undergoes a "free" fertility treatment for her modern-day motherhood series on TalkBack; Niecy becomes Mary Jane's new pet project; David realizes he wants to have a future with Mary Jane.
13	4	"Sleepless In Atlanta"	Regina King	Erika Graham	February 24, 2015	2.41
Kara protects Mary Jane; Niecy shields her and Treyvion from his father; Patrick struggles to find balance; Mary Jane and Niecy have a falling out. Guest starring: Kyle Massey
14	5	"No Eggspectations"	Salim Akil	Njeri Brown and Melora Rivera	March 3, 2015	2.09
During a live installment of Talk Back, Mary Jane is not prepared for Dr. Marrs' news; Cameron and Niecy try to come to an agreement now that he has stepped back into her life; and PJ is offered a business opportunity. Guest starring: Gayle King, Kyle Massey
15	6	"Pulling The Trigger"	Salim Akil	Adam Giaudrone	March 10, 2015	1.72
Mary Jane desires to become pregnant; Mary Jane's friendship with Lisa is strained. Guest starring: Salli Richardson, Gary Dourdan
16	7	"Let's Go Crazy"	Regina King	Mara Brock Akil	March 17, 2015	1.43
Mary Jane decides to move forward with her life; Kara must make a decision to stay partners with Mary Jane.
17	8	"One Is The Loneliest Number"	Regina King	Laurence Andries	March 24, 2015	1.23
A fatal Atlanta school shooting; Mary Jane and Sheldon's courtship advances; Mark is depressed over a breakup.
18	9	"Line In The Sand"	Rob Hardy	Erika Graham	March 31, 2015	1.59
Mary Jane gets nominated for an Emmy; Patrick discovers what happened to Tracy. Guest starring: Gary Dourdan, Salli Richardson-Whitfield, Mark Anthony Neal, India Arie, Bevy Smith, Michaela Angela Davis
19	10	"Primetime"	Rob Hardy	Story by : Erika Graham and Craig Quinn; Teleplay by : Erika Graham	April 7, 2015	1.36
Mary Jane does some shop therapy; Paul Jr. decides about a job.
20	11	"Reading The Signs"	Salim Akil	Adam Giaudrone	April 14, 2015	1.30
Mary Jane's rant goes viral; Sheldon struggles; Mark's perspective on dating. Guest starring: Gary Dourdan, Kelly Rutherford, Christina Vidal, Don Lemon
21	12	"Signing Off"	Salim Akil	Mara Brock Akil	April 14, 2015	1.46
Mary Jane moves into her primetime position at SNC; the relationship between Lisa and David is revealed and Mary Jane overhears leading her to get into a huge car accident.

=== Season 3 (2015) ===
No. overall	No. in season	Title	Directed by	Written by	Original release date	U.S. viewers (millions)
22	1	"Facing Fears"	Salim Akil	Mara Brock Akil	October 20, 2015	2.23
Mary Jane is rushed to hospital following her accident and her family rallies against David and Lisa; while sidelined, Kara fights for her future at SNC.
23	2	"Louie Louie"	Mario Van Peebles	Devon Shepard	October 20, 2015	2.24
Cece, the other woman involved in the accident, exploits both SNC and Mary Jane to profit from it; SNC hires a hot young Latina replacement anchor called Marisol Esparza.
24	3	"Sparrow"	Salim Akil	Story by : Mara Brock Akil; Teleplay by : Keli Goff & Jameal Turner	October 27, 2015	1.79
Mary Jane's friend Lisa commits suicide and Mary Jane deals with Lisa's family when they make a surprise visit.
25	4	"Being Kara"	Mario Van Peebles	Adam Giaudrone	November 3, 2015	1.45
Kara's life begin to spiral out of control; as Mary Jane struggles to get back to work, she helps Niecy land her first job.
26	5	"Hot Seat"	Neema Barnette	Erika Graham	November 10, 2015	1.78
Mary Jane resorts to unconventional methods when SNC decides to keep Marisol in the Primetime seat. Elsewhere, Neicy's neverending rift with Patrick continues, so she calls her mother Jill Scott.
27	6	"Don't Call It A Comeback"	Neema Barnette	Melora Rivera	November 17, 2015	1.38
Mark contemplates his future at SNC; things between Mary Jane and Brandon take a surprising turn when she learns about his health issues.
28	7	"If the Shoe Fits…"	Regina King	Devon Shepard	November 24, 2015	1.38
Mary Jane's birthday is forgotten by her parents, but they deal with family drama.
29	8	"Wake Up Call"	Regina King	Erika Graham	December 1, 2015	1.39
Harsh opinions are circled about Mary Jane's show while sitting in on a journalism lecture. Meanwhile, Patrick seems to get his life in order until things take a surprising turn with a family intervention.
30	9	"Purging and Cleansing"	Oz Scott	Adam Giaudrone	December 8, 2015	1.08
Mary Jane prepares to return to her "TalkBack" series and begins a life-cleanse in hopes to revive her finances and her journalism voice reclaim.
31	10	"Some Things Are Black and White"	Oz Scott	Mara Brock Akil	December 15, 2015	1.66
Mary Jane goes out with GG. and finds herself on a topic on "The Real" about interracial dating; David's mom has a talk with Mary Jane; Kara has trouble at work; and Niecy has a run-in with the police which takes a turn for the worse.

=== Season 4 (2017) ===
No. overall	No. in season	Title	Directed by	Written by	Original release date	U.S. viewers (millions)
Part 1
32	1	"Getting Nekkid"	Mario Van Peebles	Erica Kodish Shelton	January 10, 2017	1.19
One year later, Mary Jane prepares to tackle the mean streets of NYC as she seeks to make major changes in her personal life and career. Meanwhile, she has an interesting encounter with a new man that quickly get the wheels spinning in her head. Special Appearances: U.S. Senator Cory Booker, Dave East (credited as Dave Brewster)
33	2	"Getting Naked"	Mario Van Peebles	Rebecca Boss & Chris Masi	January 17, 2017	0.89
Mary Jane goes up against her idol, Ronda; Niecy tries to balance her life.
34	3	"Getting Real"	Kat Candler	Story by : Josef Sawyer; Teleplay by : Rebecca Boss & Chris Masi	January 31, 2017	1.24
An interview with a fiery reality star makes Mary Jane a social media sensation; things rapidly heat up with Lee.
35	4	"Getting Schooled"	Kat Candler	Angel Dean Lopez	February 7, 2017	0.90
Mary Jane's new position as web correspondent fuels her rivalry with Justin as she pursues the story of a teen boy beaten for wearing a skirt.
36	5	"Getting Served"	Rashaad Ernesto Green	Debra J. Fisher & Patrik-Ian Polk	February 14, 2017	0.96
While Mary Jane and PJ are homesick, Niecy has a fight at a nightclub with serious repercussions.
37	6	"Getting Home"	Rashaad Ernesto Green	Debra J. Fisher & Patrik-Ian Polk	February 21, 2017	1.01
Mary Jane and Kara return to Atlanta for pleasure and business. Lee also visits Atlanta and bond with Mary Jane's family.
38	7	"Getting Judged"	Neema Barnette	Rebecca Boss & Chris Masi	February 28, 2017	0.92
Mary Jane's interview with Judge McAlister for Good Day USA doesn't go as anyone planned. Lee's kids come for a visit.
39	8	"Getting Risky"	Neema Barnette	Angel Dean Lopez	March 7, 2017	0.84
Mary Jane and Justin put aside their differences and team up catch a good story. Meanwhile, Mary Jane agonizes about meeting Lee's baby mama.
40	9	"Getting Serious"	Adam Shankman	Patrik-Ian Polk & Debra J. Fisher	March 14, 2017	0.90
Justin ravels up a plan for Mary Jane to get a spot in the anchor chair. Also, she wants to figure out her future with Lee to decide on whether they should have a baby together. Meanwhile, Kara's relationship with Orlando becomes public knowledge.
41	10	"Getting It"	Adam Shankman	Erica Kodish Shelton	March 21, 2017	0.89
Mary Jane and Lee make risky decisions that could affect their relationship. Meanwhile, she agrees to join forces with Justin, so they devise a plan to oust Ronda out of the anchor chair but Kara gets caught in the crossfire.
Part 2
42	11	"Feeling Raw"	Darnell Martin	Erica Kodish Shelton	July 18, 2017	0.67
Mary Jane becomes distrustful of Justin in the aftermath Kara's firing, so she tries to make her relationship work with Lee, but resisting Justin undermines her performance in the coveted co-anchor spot of the morning show; Mary Jane later breaks it off with Lee and Justin realizes he wants to be with Mary Jane.
43	12	"Feeling Conflicted"	Darnell Martin	Rebecca Boss & Chris Masi	July 25, 2017	0.79
Mary Jane and Justin decide to keep their relationship in secrecy, especially since Kara's having a tough time in arbitration with her wrongful termination claim; Mary Jane soon becomes forced in a lie.
44	13	"Feeling Exposed"	Rashaad Ernesto Green	Patrik-Ian Polk	August 1, 2017	0.79
Kara discovers that Mary Jane is sleeping with Justin, putting their friendship and their work relationship in jeopardy; Helen sends Niecy to New York to find out about Mary Jane's activities and also finds love.
45	14	"Feeling Friendless"	Rashaad Ernesto Green	Debra J. Fisher	August 8, 2017	0.76
With her and Kara at odds, Mary Jane hosts a GDU party at her house; Niecy returns to Atlanta invigorated and ready to set her dreams in motion; Patrick becomes a mentor to a rowdy activist; Mary Jane comforts Kara in a family emergency.
46	15	"Feeling Hashtagged"	Adam Shankman	Angel Dean Lopez	August 15, 2017	0.58
While reporting live from a local high school, Justin returns from a vacation and later his and Mary Jane's relationship rant goes viral; Frank, an old family friend of Helen and Paul's, stirs up long-forgotten memories of a love triangle that troubled the early years of their marriage.
47	16	"Feeling Ambushed"	Adam Shankman	Resheida Brady	August 22, 2017	0.88
Mary Jane and Justin's relationship gets tested when their notoriety on social media leads to discoveries about Justin's past; Kara makes her own discovery about the girlfriend of one of Orlando's teammates.
48	17	"Feeling Lost"	Nicole Rubio	Rebecca Boss & Chris Masi	August 29, 2017	0.77
After their breakup, Mary Jane hears word of Lee's brimming success and new girlfriend; the news throws Mary Jane's already brimmed relationship with Justin into doubt; Kara meets Orlando's young, attractive mother.
49	18	"Feeling Destined"	Nicole Rubio	Debra J. Fisher	September 5, 2017	0.78
After learning that Paul and Helen plan to divorce, the Paterson family struggles to cope with the imminent changes; Mary Jane later learns that her actions were a result from her mother's actions.
50	19	"Feeling Seen"	Kevin Rodney Sullivan	Angel Dean Lopez	September 12, 2017	0.64
Mary Jane uncovers information about Justin's past that spins their love into a entirely new phase; With Garret being gone, Kara and Justin meet their new temporary executive producer that they have to take down in order for them to get the executive producer slot; Mary Jane learns that she has to become the deciding vote of choosing between Kara and Justin.
51	20	"Feeling Tested"	Kevin Rodney Sullivan	Erica Shelton Kodish & Patrik-Ian Polk	September 19, 2017	0.82
After hearing the news of being the deciding vote of who replaces Garrett, choosing between Kara and Justin, Mary Jane questions Justin's overtures toward her and Justin questions Mary Jane's loyalty to him; Kara helps Orlando in his transition from athlete to broadcaster; in the end, Kara becomes the new executive producer for Good Day USA and Mary Jane tries explain herself to Justin but he ends up walking out on her; he later shows up at her place trying to repair his relationship with Mary Jane after realizing how good of a person she is and proposes to her.

=== Television film (2019) ===
No. overall	No. in season	Title	Directed by	Written by	Original release date	U.S. viewers (millions)
52	1	"Becoming Pauletta"	Adam Shankman	Story by : Patrik-Ian Polk and Alyson Fouse and Devon Shepard; Teleplay by : Patrik-Ian Polk	April 23, 2019	0.77
Mary Jane must decide on whether to accept Justin's proposal or not. Kara has a very important decision to make that could be life-changing. Niecy seeks her family's support. Guest starring: Morris Chestnut

== Cast and characters ==
=== Main ===
- Gabrielle Union as Pauletta ("Mary Jane Paul") Patterson: a successful TV news anchor for Satellite News Channel (SNC) who remains devoted to a family that does not share her motivation as she juggles her life, her relationships, her work, and commitments. In season four, Mary Jane leaves Atlanta after getting fired from SNC and moves to New York City to work at Great Day USA as a national news correspondent. She eventually works her way up to get back on the anchor chair.
- Lisa Vidal as Kara Lynch: the executive producer of Talk Back (Mary Jane's show) at SNC and Mary Jane's best friend.
- Margaret Avery as Helen Patterson: Mary Jane's overprotective mother, who is battling lupus.
- Latarsha Rose as Dr. Lisa Hudson (seasons 1–3): Mary Jane's best friend since elementary school, an OB/GYN.
- Aaron D. Spears as Mark Bradley (seasons 1–3): a co-anchor at the newsroom and the closeted gay friend of Mary Jane.
- Richard Brooks as Patrick Patterson: Mary Jane's older, less-motivated brother.
- B. J. Britt as Paul Patterson Jr.: Mary Jane's responsible younger brother.
- Raven Goodwin as Niecy Patterson: Mary Jane's niece; Patrick Patterson's daughter, who is also a mother.
- Richard Roundtree as Paul Patterson Sr.: Mary Jane's compassionate father.
- Omari Hardwick as Andre Daniels (season 1): Mary Jane's married love interest
- Stephen Bishop as David Paulk (recurring, season 1; main, seasons 2–3): Mary Jane's playboy love interest.

=== Recurring ===
- Robinne Lee as Avery Daniels (season 1): Andre's wife, who learns of her husband's affair with Mary Jane.
- Tatom Pender as Tracy: Patrick's girlfriend and mother of their child.
- Brely Evans as Nichelle: Mary Jane's friend and publicist to the stars.
- Kelly Rutherford as Cynthia Phillips (seasons 1–2)
- Navia Robinson (seasons 1–2) and Madison Alsobrook (season 4) as D'Asia: Patrick and Tracy's daughter
- Ryan Homchick as Lance (seasons 1–3)
- Salli Richardson as Valerie (season 2) one of Mary Jane's friends who is a doctor.
- Gary Dourdan as Sheldon (season 2)
- Kyle Massey as Cameron (season 2) Niecy's ex and the father of their son Treyvion.
- Loretta Devine as Cece (season 3)
- Daniella Alonso as Marisol Esparza (season 3)
- Thomas Jones as Brandon (season 3) one of Mary Jane's lovers
- Paul Rolfes as Aaron Felty (seasons 3–4) one of the lead co-hosts on Good Day USA
- Rita Rucker as Chante (seasons 3–4)
- Michael Ealy as Justin Talbot (season 4) Mary Jane's colleague at Good Day USA and boyfriend and later husband
- Chiké Okonkwo as Lee Truitt (season 4) Mary Jane's ex-boyfriend
- Valarie Pettiford as Ronda Sales (season 4) one of the lead co-hosts on Good Day USA
- Ashton Holmes as Garrett (season 4) the executive producer of Good Day USA
- Julian Walker as Ty (season 4) Mary Jane's stylist
- Cesar Cipriano as Dante (season 4) Niecy's ex and father to their daughter Isbell
- Tian Richards as Jovan (season 4) a mentee to Patrick
- Nicholas Gonzalez as Orlando Lagos (season 4) Kara's fiancé

=== Guest stars ===
- Jasmine Dustin as Ana Hoem (season 1)
- Lesley-Ann Brandt as Tamiko Roberts (season 1)
- Sheila Frazier as Catherine Stafford (season 1)
- Darrin Dewitt Henson (season 1)
- Lorraine Toussaint as Aunt Toni, Paul's younger sister and Mary Jane's aunt (season 1)
- Wayne Brady as Sean Anders (season 1)
- Ludacris as Terrence Mitchell (season 1)
- Dorian Missick as Detective Cedric Rawlins (season 1)
- Frances Burnett as Dana Shultz (season 1)
- Ava DuVernay (season 1)
- India Arie as herself (season 2)
- Christina Vidal as Lilly, the sister of Kara (Note: Christina Vidal plays the sister of Kara, played by her real-life sister Lisa Vidal.) (season 2)
- Nina Parker (season 3, episode 6)
- Jill Scott (season 3, episode 5)
- Kelly Rowland as Robin (season 3, episode 6)
- Tamar Braxton as Herself (season 3, episode 10)
- Tamera Mowry as Herself (season 3, episode 10)
- Loni Love as Herself (season 3, episode 10)
- Jeannie Mai as Herself (season 3, episode 10)
- Adrienne Bailon as Herself (season 3, episode 10)
- Robert Crayton as Lloyd (season 4)
- Cardi B (season 4)
- Loren "Lo London" Jordan (season 4)
- Dave East (season 4)
- Morris Chestnut as Beau (season 4)

== Production ==
The show was originally to be called Single Black Female. The series centers on successful broadcast journalist Mary Jane Paul (played by Gabrielle Union) and her professional and private family life while searching for "Mr. Right":

Mary Jane Paul has it all: she's a successful TV news anchor, entirely self-sufficient – an all-around powerhouse who remains devoted to a family that doesn't share her motivation. As Mary Jane juggles her life, her work and her commitment to her family, we find out how far she's willing to go to find the puzzle pieces that she, and society, insist are missing from her life as a single Black female.

The series was created and produced by Mara Brock Akil, who also created and produced the hit sitcoms Girlfriends and The Game. The pilot episode was filmed in April 2012 at 780 N. Highland Ave. in the Virginia Highland neighborhood of Atlanta.

After the third season, creator Mara Brock Akil left the series and Erica Shelton Kodish was hired as the show's new showrunner for the fourth season. Kodish had previously worked as a writer and producer on shows like CSI: NY, Cold Case and The Good Wife. Speaking about her approach to taking over the show to BuzzFeed, Kodish stated that she wasn't afraid to shake things up. "I was anxious about how viewers were going to react to change in general — any kind of change. But I felt like it really had to happen". The casting during the fourth season had been done in part by Winsome Sinclair.

== Controversy ==
In 2016, Gabrielle Union sued BET over compensation.

== Streaming ==
The complete series is available to stream on Hulu, Paramount+, and BET+ in the United States.

== Reception ==
=== Critical response ===
The second and third seasons received positive reviews, specifically praising Gabrielle Union's leading performance, Mara Brock Akil's writing, and directing work by Regina King.

On the review aggregator website Rotten Tomatoes, the first season earned an approval rating of 80% based on 10 reviews, with an average rating of 7.1/10. Metacritic, which uses a weighted average, assigned the pilot a score of 78 out of 100 based on 4 critics reviews, indicating "generally favorable reviews".

=== Accolades ===
Year	Award	Category	Nominee(s)	Result
2014	45th NAACP Image Awards	Outstanding Television Movie, Mini-Series, or Dramatic Special	Being Mary Jane	Won
2014	45th NAACP Image Awards	Outstanding Actor in a Television Movie, Mini-Series, or Dramatic Special	Omari Hardwick	Nominated
2014	45th NAACP Image Awards	Outstanding Actress in a Television Movie, Mini-Series, or Dramatic Special	Gabrielle Union	Won
2015	46th NAACP Image Awards			
2015	46th NAACP Image Awards	Outstanding Drama Series	Being Mary Jane	Nominated
2015	46th NAACP Image Awards	Outstanding Actress in a Drama Series	Gabrielle Union	Nominated
2015	46th NAACP Image Awards	Outstanding Actor in a Drama Series	Omari Hardwick	Nominated
2015	46th NAACP Image Awards	Outstanding Writing in a Dramatic Series	Mara Brock Akil (for "Uber Love")	Nominated
2016	47th NAACP Image Awards			
2016	47th NAACP Image Awards	Outstanding Drama Series	Being Mary Jane	Nominated
2016	47th NAACP Image Awards	Outstanding Actress in a Drama Series	Gabrielle Union	Nominated
2016	47th NAACP Image Awards	Outstanding Writing in a Dramatic Series	Mara Brock Akil, Keli Goff, and Jameal Turner (for "Sparrow")	Won
2016	47th NAACP Image Awards	Outstanding Directing in a Drama Series	Salim Akil (for "Sparrow")	Nominated
2020	51st NAACP Image Awards			
2020	51st NAACP Image Awards	Outstanding Television Movie, Mini-Series, or Dramatic Special	Being Mary Jane	Nominated
2020	51st NAACP Image Awards	Outstanding Actress in a Television Movie, Mini-Series, or Dramatic Special	Gabrielle Union	Nominated
2020	51st NAACP Image Awards	Outstanding Writing in a Motion Picture (Television)	Patrik-Ian Polk	Nominated
