= Treehouse (Into the Dark) =

- Into the Dark episode
- Promotional poster
- Episode no.: Season 1 Episode 6
- Directed by: James Roday Rodriguez
- Written by: James Roday; Todd Harthan
- Original air date: March 1, 2019

Guest appearances
- Jimmi Simpson as Peter Rake; Michael Weston as Lonnie; Amanda Walsh as Gwen Rake; Nancy Linehan Charles as Agnes; Julianna Guill as Kara Wheeler; Stephanie Beatriz as Elena; Shaunette Renée Wilson as Marie; Maggie Lawson as Rebecca Wheeler; Mary McCormack as Lilith; Sophia Del Pizzo as Morgan; Sutton Foster as Lauren; Cass Bugge as Delivery Girl

Episode chronology
← Previous "Down"	Next → "I'm Just F*cking with You"

"Treehouse" is an episode of American horror anthology web television series Into the Dark that aired as the sixth episode of the show's first season. It premiered in the United States on March 1, 2019, on Hulu. The episode was written and directed by James Roday Rodriguez and stars Jimmi Simpson, Mary McCormack, Shaunette Renée Wilson, Maggie Lawson, Stephanie Beatriz, Julianna Guill, Michael Weston, Amanda Walsh, Sophia Del Pizzo, Sutton Foster, and Cass Bugge.

== Plot ==
Peter Rake (Jimmi Simpson) is a budding celebrity chef of considerable success. He has an 11-year-old daughter Riley (Kylie Rogers) from a failed marriage, plus some unspecified legal troubles. While he hasn't been able to bond with Riley, he has named his restaurant and cutlery line after her while stating that he "needs her."

The weekend of his ex-wife's remarriage, he drives to his family estate where he'll stay with a lone servant, the elderly Agnes (Nancy Linehan Charles). On the trip, he runs into an old high school classmate named Lonnie (Michael Weston), who operates a bait shop, and also meets with his estranged sister Gwen (Amanda Walsh) who is a district attorney working on an important case and whom Lonnie has a crush on. As the siblings catch up, it is mentioned that Peter wasn't invited to his father's funeral.

One evening, a woman from across the canyon, Kara (Julianna Guill), stops by to say the power went out in the middle of their bachelorette party and asks to borrow some candles. Peter obliges, though Kara seems at first reluctant to follow him into his house. While jogging near his old treehouse the next day, Peter runs into Kara with her friends, including the bride-to-be, Marie (Shaunette Renée Wilson). Peter offers to cook dinner for them.

Arriving for Peter's dinner are Kara, Marie, Elena (Stephanie Beatriz), Morgan (Sophia Del Pizzo), and Lilith (Mary McCormack). For much of the evening, Peter is charming, but he makes occasional cringe-worthy and sexist comments, especially after downing several glasses of wine. For example, he makes joking references to Agnes' age and to Elena's (Puerto Rican) and Morgan's (English) ancestry. Before retiring for bed, he makes a crack about "spooning" with the women. He also notices during the dinner that all of the women have the same Celtic symbol tattooed on their wrists, which they tell him is symbolic for sisterhood.

When Peter awakes later that night, strange things transpire. He is startled to see Morgan asleep next to him. Hearing old-timey music downstairs, he investigates and finds a peacock in his house. Several figures in odd costume invade the home, who are soon revealed to be Kara and her friends. Peter is partially paralyzed and chained to a bed by the women. They threaten him in various ways, including Morgan pointing a crossbow aimed at his crotch and the others dressing him up in women’s clothing and makeup. When a defiant Peter calls them "angry bitches," they reply "we're angry witches," and explain that they are punishing him for his past sins against women. These include his role in the suicide of Kara's sister Rebecca (Maggie Lawson) who Peter once dated before she died using heroin and Peter's cutlery, the sexual harassment of Lilith's daughter who nobody believed, and the firing of Elena's mother who was given unequal wages.

Peter escapes but is re-captured when he passes out after trying to call 911 and Lonnie. Lonnie comes over and is suspicious of Kara's claims that they are all just having a nice dinner. Agnes shows up and tells Lonnie to go home, which he reluctantly does as it is revealed that he is Agnes' son from an affair that Peter's dad had with her. Kara is surprised by this, but Agnes tells her to finish what she started. Peter is then released to be chased by the witches. He runs to the treehouse, the inside of which is decorated with photos and articles about his crimes. When his sister Gwen arrives in her car in an apparent rescue attempt, Peter discovers that she is actually working with the witches, though Gwen implies that she didn’t know they’d take it that far. However, Gwen reminds Peter that he once raped her best friend Rebecca in the treehouse, revealing the reason for a bloody chess table and mattress next to the articles he saw in there earlier. He tries to excuse his action by saying he was a drunk teenager at the time. Meanwhile, the witches arrive and Gwen’s car window explodes as the women surround the car, dragging out Gwen and Peter separately. Peter is tied up again with his hands apparently nailed down.

When Peter awakes the next morning, everything seems normal as he is in the clothes he originally slept in and his hands aren't injured. Initially believing yesterday's events were a nightmare, he receives a phone call from Kara warning him that he'll suffer if he ever hurts another woman again, followed by the burners suddenly erupting in flames.

Bedraggled, Peter leaves the estate after seeing that the painting of Rebecca has been replaced with a portrait of an elk he previously saw on the hill. He then goes to his ex-wife's house to see Riley. Kneeling before Riley, he tells her she is "precious" and asks her to never let him or any man take her for granted. He then apologizes to his ex-wife for his past behavior. Before Peter leaves, an Atlas Parcel Service delivery woman (Cass Bugge) he has never met greets him while delivering for the wedding and flashes the same Celtic tattoo that the bachelorette party women had while claiming that she is watching him. Peter considers heeding Kara's threat.

Meanwhile, Kara, Gwen, Marie, Elena, Morgan, and Lilith reconvene at the house as they celebrate their victory. It turns out, however, that the women are not witches. The witchcraft was ordinary practical trickery and, with the help of Agnes, they drugged Peter's food to cause partial paralysis and hallucinations as well as using explosive charges and fake stakes to put on his hands. Gwen was involved in the ploy as well, as she intended to teach her brother a lesson.

== Production ==
=== Development ===
On November 27, 2018, it was reported that an episode of the series titled "Treehouse" would air in March 2019. On December 18, 2018, it was reported that the episode was written and directed by James Roday and that it would premiere on March 1, 2019.

=== Casting ===
Alongside the announcement of the episode's premiere, it was confirmed that it would star Jimmi Simpson, Mary McCormack, Shaunette Renée Wilson, Maggie Lawson, Stephanie Beatriz, Julianna Guill, Michael Weston, Amanda Walsh, Sutton Foster, and Cass Bugge.

== Reception ==
The episode has been met with mixed reviews from critics. At RogerEbert.com, Brian Tallerico awarded it two stars out of four, writing that it is "just good enough that you wish it was better." He praised the ensemble acting and the script's topicality, but criticized the directing and wondered whether the story shouldn't have been told from the women's perspective. A more favorable review came from Matt Donato at Slashfilm, who gave it a score of 8.5/10. Donato thought the horror elements worked, and said the story "bleeds modern relevance and promotes endless discussion."

At the other extreme, Paste's review was entitled "A Truly Dreadful Foray Into #MeToo Territory," concluding that it "appears desperate to namecheck the issues of the day while failing to engage with those issues meaningfully."
