= Flesh & Blood (Into the Dark) =

- Into the Dark episode
- Episode no.: Season 1 Episode 2
- Directed by: Patrick Lussier
- Written by: Louis Ackerman
- Cinematography by: Amanda Treyz
- Editing by: Kayla M. Emter
- Original air date: November 2, 2018
- Running time: 93 minutes

Guest appearances
- Dermot Mulroney as Henry Tooms; Diana Silvers as Kimberly Tooms; Tembi Locke as Dr. Helen Saunders; Meredith Salenger as Rose Tooms; Heidi Sulzman as Officer Foster; Lavetta Cannon as Officer Banks; Matthew Downs as Mr. Taylor; Liisa Cohen as Police Official; Rasha Goel as News Anchor; Erin Fitzgerald as Emergency Operator; Krystin Noel Goodwin as Newscaster / Radio DJ

Episode chronology
← Previous "The Body"	Next → "Pooka!"

"Flesh & Blood" is an episode of American horror anthology web television series Into the Dark that aired as the second episode of the show's first season. It originally premiered in the United States on November 2, 2018, on Hulu. The episode was directed by Patrick Lussier from a script written by Louis Ackerman and stars Dermot Mulroney, Diana Silvers, Tembi Locke and Meredith Salenger.

== Plot ==
In a flashback sequence, the Tooms family - Henry, Rose and their teenage daughter Kimberly - are sitting down to Thanksgiving dinner, sharing their thoughts about what they have to be thankful for. Nearly a year later in the present, Rose Tooms has been murdered and her killer has not been found. Henry (Dermot Mulroney) spends much of his time renovating their house, which Kimberly (Diana Silvers) cannot leave due to a severe case of agoraphobia. Kimberly is taking medication, she spends her time on an online agoraphobia support group, and she meets regularly in her home with a therapist, Dr. Helen Saunders (Tembi Locke), who is becoming dissatisfied with the lack of progress.

For her 17th birthday present, Kimberly receives from her father a necklace with a charm on it. When watching a television news report about a recently abducted teenage girl, Kimberly notices that the charm on the gifted necklace looks identical to the one the missing girl is wearing. She goes online to research cases of other missing young females, and notices they look similar to her dead mother. Suspicious of her father, Kimberly searches his room and the attic, finding evidence that appears to incriminate him. She calls her aunt for help with the intent of leaving the home, but can't due to her agoraphobia.

Tensions mount in the house. Kimberly confronts her dad, accusing him of killing the missing females and her mom. At one point, she feels threatened by her father and calls 911. However, her father convinces her that she needs him, and when two LAPD officers arrive, Kimberly recants her accusation. The officers leave the home, but before they do, one of them gives Kimberly her card.

Kimberly goes online to research Propofol, a bottle of which she has found among her father's belongings. Discovering that it is an anesthetic and sedative, she becomes more convinced that her father is a killer. Meanwhile, Henry has located evidence of his daughter's snooping. Father and daughter become violent towards each other. Kimberly slashes Henry with a knife after he lunges at her. He chases and catches her, injects her with Propofol, and locks her in her room. She escapes her room, but not the house, and Henry catches her again after a chase in which they cause considerable damage to the house.

Dr. Saunders arrives for her next session, and Henry warns Kimberly that if she says anything, someone will get hurt. He also sits in on the therapy session. When Kimberly goes to the kitchen to make tea, she puts Propofol in her father's cup and slips a note ("Need Help, call 911") under Dr. Saunders’ cup. The therapist notices the note as she's leaving, upon which Henry pulls her back into the house and kills her with a box cutter.

Henry ties up Kimberly and confesses to his murders, but he blames Kimberly for the therapist's death. The Propofol kicks in, however, and he is temporarily knocked out. Kimberly is able to grab the box cutter and free herself. She calls the police officers, who instruct her to leave the home, but she cannot. Henry awakes and attacks Kimberly. Noticeably crazed, he pours gasoline throughout the home and sets it on fire. In the attic, Kimberly entices Henry into walking over a covered hole in the floor, and he tumbles below and is eventually consumed by the fire. Kimberly crawls out a window to escape the burning house and waits for the police to arrive.

== Production ==
=== Development ===
On May 2, 2018, it was announced that the series had been titled Into the Dark and that its second episode was titled "Flesh & Blood". Patrick Lussier was set as the episode's director and it was set to be released on November 2, 2018.

=== Casting ===
Simultaneously with the announcement of the series premiere, it was confirmed that Dermot Mulroney, Diana Silvers, and Tembi Locke would star in the episode.

== Release ==
On October 24, 2018, a trailer for the episode "Flesh and Blood" was released.

== Reception ==
The episode was met with a positive response from critics upon its premiere. On the review aggregation website Rotten Tomatoes, the episode holds a 75% approval rating with an average rating of 6.2 out of 10 based on 8 reviews.

In a positive review, Hulu Watcher's Paul Zuniga praised the episode saying "The final credit 'Flesh And Blood' deserves is of presenting a mystery that remained unsolved until the very end. Most horror mysteries grant audiences an omniscient perspective of the situation so they know who the real villain/hero is before the characters involved do. 'Flesh And Blood', on the other hand, keeps audiences guessing to the final act of the episode." In a similarly favorable analysis, Laughing Place's Mike Mack said, "The episode's ability to make the viewer uncomfortable is an accomplishment in and of itself, and one that the horror genre typically strives for. The story paces well, with spurts of intense drama dispersed throughout."

In a more mixed critique, Paste's Jacob Oller gave the episode a rating of 6 out of 10 and commented "Yet, adequately entertaining, with a couple of great lead performances (a list which includes Mulroney’s pulsing forehead veins) and a deliciously intense end, 'Flesh & Blood' is a pretty-if-stupid B-movie whose schlockiness has plenty to unpack for those looking for an easy thrill." In a further ambivalent editorial, Hypable's Katie Awad criticized the episode's lack of a real connection to Thanksgiving but compared it favorably to the first episode saying that it is, "a more classic horror story, lacking the humor and buckets of gore as the premiere, but it makes up for it with edge-of-your-seat tension." In another equivocal criticism, /Film's Daniel Kurland gave the episode a rating of 5 out of 10 and said that it, "evokes a stifled, more straightforward household blueprint. Squeamish slasher deaths traded for familial cat-and-mouse chasing, hellborn Nic Cage swapped with handyman Dermot Mulroney. Lussier works on a smaller scale that even at 80ish minutes wears itself thin. Less a mystery and more a delaying of the inevitable."

In an outright negative appraisal, Bloody Disgusting's Daniel Kurl gave the episode 3 out of 5 skulls and said that "While the performances are enjoyable and plenty of 'Flesh & Blood' is thoughtfully handled, some of its plotting feels rather convenient and hackneyed. There are ample opportunities where the story could deepen, but it instead spins its wheels on the same ideas." In a similarly unfavorable assessment, RogerEbert.com's Brian Tallerico gave the episode 2 out of 5 stars and commented "And so as 'Flesh & Blood' becomes more predictable, the filmmaking doesn't tighten like it needs to in order to go from mystery to thriller. It just sags and dries out like, well, an overcooked turkey."
