= Intruders (TV series) =

Drama television series based on Michael Marshall Smith's novel The Intruders

- Intertitle of Intruders
- Genre: Drama, mystery, paranormal fiction
- Based on: The Intruders by Michael Marshall Smith
- Developed by: Glen Morgan
- Written by: Glen Morgan
- Directed by: Eduardo Sánchez; Daniel Stamm
- Starring: John Simm; Mira Sorvino; Tory Kittles; James Frain; Millie Bobby Brown
- Composer: Bear McCreary
- Countries of origin: United States; United Kingdom
- Original language: English
- No. of seasons: 1
- No. of episodes: 8

Production
- Executive producers: Jane Tranter; Julie Gardner; Glen Morgan; Rose Lam
- Camera setup: Single
- Running time: 60 minutes
- Production company: BBC Worldwide Productions

Original release
- Network: BBC America
- Release: August 23 – October 11, 2014

Intruders is a drama television series based on Michael Marshall Smith's novel The Intruders (2007). An eight-episode season premiered in August 2014 on the American cable television network BBC America and was a joint production between BBC America and British channel BBC Two. Eduardo Sánchez and Daniel Stamm share directing duties. On February 27, 2015, it was announced that Intruders was cancelled after one season.

== Plot ==
Jack Whelan is a former Los Angeles Police Department (LAPD) detective who is asked to investigate strange occurrences related to a string of attempted suicides. Despite his efforts, he is stumped. He concentrates his search on a secret society, Qui Reverti (Latin for 'who return'), whose members chase immortality by seeking refuge in the bodies of others after their own deaths. Agents of the society, called "Shepherds", find the hosts of the returning souls and show them "triggers"––items important to the returning Qui Reverti members in their past lives––that "awaken" the returning soul. Once awakened, the intruding soul engages in a battle of wills with the host's soul, with the losing soul sent to the afterlife. In Whelan's case, this process destroys his marriage when his wife's body is taken by an intruder.

A serial killer named Marcus Fox comes back to life in the body of a little girl. Both souls fight for control, causing their memories to become confused. The struggle is exacerbated when the little girl becomes aware of the Qui Reverti guidebook for returning souls and begins using the information without truly understanding it.

== Main cast ==
- John Simm as Jack Whelan:
  A former LAPD detective who becomes involved with the Qui Reverti conspiracy. When his wife's soul is lost to an intruder, he destroys many triggers to stop other intruders. Despite this, he is recruited as a Shepherd and instructed to kill anyone who might reveal the organization's existence.
- Mira Sorvino as Amy Whelan/Rose Gilcrest:
  Jack's wife whose soul is supplanted by that of Rose Gilcrest. It is unknown if Amy's soul is completely gone, given that Rose protects Jack.
- Tory Kittles as Gary Fischer:
  Jack's friend who was exposed to a machine which allows him to recognize the soul in a body. He sees the soul of a friend, displaced by an intruder, in his infant daughter, and becomes increasingly unstable. He commits suicide by jumping off the roof of the Qui Reverti headquarters with information about the organization.
- James Frain as Richard Shepherd:
  An assassin who takes a bribe to shepherd Marcus Fox instead of killing him. Guilt-ridden over his actions, he attempts to kill Madison, and covers his tracks throughout the season.
- Millie Bobby Brown as Madison O'Donnell:
  A 9-year-old girl who serves as the vessel for Marcus Fox. However, Madison constantly fights to regain her body. When she suffers a bullet wound, Marcus tries to expel her but is himself forced out. She later suffers the consequences of Marcus's actions in her body.
- Alex Diakun as Marcus Fox:
  A Qui Reverti member who is a serial killer. When the organization decides to give him a final death, he bribes Richard for one more life. Marcus tries to regain his former status but is unable to dominate Madison's soul, leading to an internal struggle.

== Episodes ==
No.	Title	Directed by	Written by	UK air date	U.S. air date	UK viewers (millions)	U.S. viewers (millions)
1	"She Was Provisional"	Eduardo Sánchez	Glen Morgan	October 27, 2014	August 23, 2014	0.951	0.796
2	"And Here... You Must Listen"	Eduardo Sánchez	Glen Morgan	October 27, 2014	August 30, 2014	0.751	0.366
3	"Time Has Come Today"	Eduardo Sánchez	Glen Morgan	November 3, 2014	September 6, 2014	0.430	0.293
4	"Ave Verum Corpus"	Eduardo Sánchez	Glen Morgan	November 10, 2014	September 13, 2014	0.448	0.306
5	"The Shepherds and the Fox"	Daniel Stamm	Glen Morgan & Darin Morgan	November 17, 2014	September 20, 2014	0.470	0.311
6	"Bound"	Daniel Stamm	Glen Morgan & Kristen Cloke	November 22, 2014	September 27, 2014	N/A	0.238
7	"The Crossing Place"	Daniel Stamm	Darin Morgan & Glen Morgan	November 29, 2014	October 4, 2014	N/A	0.243
8	"There Is No End"	Daniel Stamm	Glen Morgan & Kristen Cloke	December 6, 2014	October 11, 2014	N/A	0.267
