= Maggie (2022 TV series) =

2022 American television sitcom

- Genre: Sitcom
- Created by: Justin Adler & Maggie Mull
- Based on: Maggie by Tim Curcio
- Starring: Rebecca Rittenhouse; David Del Rio; Nichole Sakura; Angelique Cabral; Chloe Bridges; Ray Ford; Leonardo Nam; Kerri Kenney-Silver; Chris Elliott
- Composer: Duncan Blickenstaff
- Country of origin: United States
- Original language: English
- No. of seasons: 1
- No. of episodes: 13

Production
- Executive producers: Justin Adler; Maggie Mull; Evan Hayes; Jeff Morton; Natalia Anderson
- Producer: Joe Cristalli
- Camera setup: Single-camera
- Running time: 20–26 minutes
- Production companies: 40 or 50 Years, Inc.; Hen of the Woods; 20th Television

Original release
- Network: Hulu
- Release: July 6, 2022

Maggie is an American television sitcom created by Justin Adler and Maggie Mull, based on the short film of the same name by Tim Curcio. The 13-episode first season was released on the Hulu streaming service on July 6, 2022, with Rebecca Rittenhouse in the title role. The series was cancelled In September 2022. The series was removed from Hulu on May 26, 2023, following a Disney+ and Hulu content removal purge as part of a broader cost cutting initiative under Disney CEO Bob Iger.

== Premise ==
Maggie tells the story of a psychic who has visions of the future. As a psychic, she sees the fate of her friends, parents, clients and random strangers on the street, but when she suddenly sees a glimpse of her own future, she must start living in her own present.

== Cast and characters ==
=== Main ===
- Rebecca Rittenhouse as Maggie
- David Del Rio as Ben
- Nichole Sakura as Louise
- Angelique Cabral as Amy
- Chloe Bridges as Jessie
- Ray Ford as Angel
- Leonardo Nam as Dave
- Kerri Kenney-Silver as Maria
- Chris Elliott as Jack

=== Recurring ===
- Adam Korson as Daniel
- Trent Garrett as John
- Andy Favreau as Sam
- Martin Mull as Zach
- Brent Bailey as Spencer
- Ryan Caltagirone as James
- Jake Lockett as Plant Guy

== Episodes ==
No.	Title	Directed by	Written by	Original release date	Prod. code
1	"Things Begin Where They End"	Natalia Anderson	Teleplay by : Maggie Mull; Story by : Justin Adler & Maggie Mull	July 6, 2022	1HHY01
2	"A New Friendship Awaits You"	Natalia Anderson	Teleplay by : Maggie Mull; Story by : Justin Adler & Maggie Mull	July 6, 2022	1HHY02
3	"You Are the Master of Your Own Emotions"	Natalia Anderson	Solomon Georgio	July 6, 2022	1HHY09
4	"A Dinner Guest Will Surprise You"	Lee Shallat Chemel	Ceda Xiong	July 6, 2022	1HHY04
5	"You Are a Skilled Mentor by Nature"	Justin Adler	Dani Shank	July 6, 2022	1HHY03
6	"I See a Baby in Your Future"	Natalia Anderson	Tim Curcio	July 6, 2022	1HHY05
7	"You Will Have a Night to Remember"	Jaffar Mahmood	Joe Cristalli	July 6, 2022	1HHY07
8	"Your Past Will Inform Your Present"	Jude Weng	Hayley Adams & Joellen Redlingshafer	July 6, 2022	1HHY08
9	"You Will Help Someone Take a Chance"	Katie Locke O'Brien	Jesse Esparza	July 6, 2022	1HHY06
10	"A Mysterious Invitation Awaits You"	Shiri Appleby	Max Saltarelli	July 6, 2022	1HHY10
11	"You Will Experience a Loss"	Ken Whittingham	Ilana Wernick	July 6, 2022	1HHY11
12	"The Fortune You Seek Is in Another Cookie"	Molly McGlynn	Nicole "Colby" Bachiller & Katharine Konietzko	July 6, 2022	1HHY12
13	"Things End Where They Began"	Natalia Anderson	Maggie Mull	July 6, 2022	1HHY13

== Production ==
=== Development ===
The series received a pilot order from ABC in January 2021. Justin Adler and Maggie Mull were set to write and executive produce the series. Evan Hayes also serves as executive producer, with 20th Television producing. In April 2021, Natalia Anderson joined as director of the pilot. One month later, Maggie received a series order, with Jeff Morton joining as executive producer. In January 2022, the series moved from ABC to Hulu. On September 9, 2022, Hulu cancelled the series after one season.

=== Casting ===
Rebecca Rittenhouse was cast as the title role in March 2021. David Del Rio, Chris Elliott, Ray Ford, and Leonardo Nam joined the cast one month later. Later that month, Nichole Sakura, Angelique Cabral, Chloe Bridges, and Kerri Kenney-Silver joined as series regulars. In October 2021, Adam Korson joined in a recurring role.

== Release ==
Maggie streams on Hulu. Internationally Maggie streams on Disney+ as a Star Original. The series was removed from Hulu and Disney+ on May 26, 2023.

== Reception ==
On the review aggregator website Rotten Tomatoes, 62% of 13 critics' reviews are positive, with an average rating of 6.3/10. The website's critics consensus reads, "For a sitcom with such a heady concept, Maggie can feel flimsily slight, but its disarming unpretentiousness and charming cast point to a promising enough future." Metacritic, which uses a weighted average, assigned a score of 65 out of 100 based on 8 critics, indicating "generally favorable reviews".
