= The Body (Into the Dark) =

- Into the Dark episode
- Episode no.: Season 1 Episode 1
- Directed by: Paul Davis
- Written by: Paul Fischer; Paul Davis
- Based on: The Body by: Paul Davis; Paul Fischer
- Cinematography by: Scott Winig
- Editing by: Nathan Easterling
- Original air date: October 5, 2018
- Running time: 82 minutes

Guest appearances
- Tom Bateman as Wilkes; Rebecca Rittenhouse as Maggie; Aurora Perrineau as Dorothy; David Hull as Allan Morgan Adams; Ray Santiago as Jack Baker; Harvey Guillén as Nick; Max Adler as Officer Freer; Alex Winter as The Voice; Sasha Grey as herself; Chasty Ballesteros as Bubblegum Girl; Raymond Forchion as Hank; John Landis as Man in Bathroom; Allie Goertz as Dive Bar Singer; Patrick Hume as Homeless Guy; Charlotte Evelyn Williams as Party Girl

Episode chronology
← Previous —	Next → "Flesh & Blood"

"The Body" is an episode of American horror anthology web television series Into the Dark that aired as the first episode of the show's first season. It originally premiered in the United States on October 5, 2018, on Hulu. The episode was directed by Paul Davis from a script he co-wrote with Paul Fischer, based on the 2013 short film of the same name also written by the duo. It stars Tom Bateman, Rebecca Rittenhouse, Aurora Perrineau, David Hull, Ray Santiago, Harvey Guillén, and Max Adler.

== Plot ==
Professional hitman Wilkes (Tom Bateman) has just finished murdering an unidentified famous man in his lavish apartment. Sipping a glass of the dead man's wine and tasting his casu marzu, Wilkes receives a call from his employer and lets him know he finished the job. The only thing left is to remove the body. Wilkes wraps it up like a mummy and drags it through the hotel lobby and into the street. He is seen by several people, but they assume it is all part of his Halloween costume.

On the city streets, Wilkes bumps into three young people who are on their way to a party: Alan Morgan Adams (David Hull), Dorothy (Aurora Perrineau) and Nick (Harvey Guillén). Thinking his costume is cool, they ask him to join them, and he accepts the offer only to get a ride away from the police, who are nearby investigating the vandalism of parked cars.

The party itself is an elaborate Halloween costume party held at a mansion, and hosted by trust fund baby Jack Baker (Ray Santiago). Wilkes drags the wrapped corpse in, and it attracts the interest of partiers who believe it is a prop. The taciturn Wilkes has no use for the party. He also doesn't attempt to hide who he is, relying instead on everyone's acceptance that it's a Halloween act. He is chatted up by Maggie (Rebecca Rittenhouse), an employee of Jack who is dressed as Marie Antoinette. She agrees to give him a ride to leave the party.

However, their departure is slowed by the gang of partiers - Jack, Alan, Dorothy and Nick - who eventually discover that the corpse is real (and was still alive until Jack trampled it). Upon this revelation, Wilkes kills Nick with a thrown knife and vows to kill the others. But Jack tricks Maggie into opening a booby-trapped drawer, and the distraction allows Jack, Alan and Dorothy to escape with the corpse as Alan thinks there will be a reward. Jack locates a police officer (Max Adler) and brings him to the body in a parking garage.

Maggie is left behind with Wilkes and, curiously fascinated with the hitman, offers him help, though he repeatedly says they aren't working together. They escape Jack's rigged room and pursue the trio with the body. This leads to Wilkes slitting the policeman's throat. The chase proceeds through the streets, with Maggie using her technology skills to track the trio and frame them for the cop's murder. Increasingly bickering with one another, Jack, Alan and Dorothy set out to destroy the body, first trying acid, then taking him to an incinerator at a funeral home.

The pursuit takes both groups through a cemetery, where Wilkes and Maggie kiss before he stabs her and leaves her for dead. On his own now, Wilkes catches up with the trio at the funeral home. He kills a security guard and then Jack, who has broken off from the others. Dorothy and Alan have the body in the incinerator room and are waiting for the oven to heat up. When Wilkes arrives, they try to shoot and strangle him, but fail. Wilkes kills Alan, then Dorothy accidentally shoots herself when a bullet intended for the hitman bizarrely rebounds off a flimsy metal tray and strikes her in the middle of her forehead.

Wilkes finally recovers the body and calls his employer to inform him that everything is in order. While on the phone, however, he is shot by Maggie, who has survived the stabbing. She uses police tape found nearby to wrap up Wilkes' body and drags it to a dumpster. On the way, she passes a group of people and tells them it is part of her Halloween costume, an explanation they accept at face value.

== Production ==
=== Development ===
On May 2, 2018, it was announced that the series had been titled Into the Dark and would premiere on October 5, 2018, with an episode entitled "The Body", directed by Paul Davis who co-wrote the script with Paul Fischer. Davis and Fischer were announced as producers and Alexa Faigen executive producer.

=== Casting ===
Simultaneously with the announcement of the series premiere, it was confirmed that Tom Bateman, Rebecca Rittenhouse, Aurora Perrineau, David Hull, and Ray Santiago would star in the episode.

== Release ==
=== Marketing ===
On September 13, 2018, the first trailer for "The Body" was released. On October 1, 2018, a second trailer for the episode was released.

=== Premiere ===
On September 21, 2018, Into the Dark held its world premiere during the annual LA Film Festival in Los Angeles, California with a screening of "The Body" at the Writers Guild Theater.

== Reception ==
The episode was met with a mixed response from critics upon its premiere. On the review aggregation website Rotten Tomatoes, the episode holds a 50% approval rating with an average rating of 5.44 out of 10 based on 18 reviews. The website's critical consensus reads, "With its clever blend of comedic skills and horrific thrills, "The Body" initially intrigues, but its thin plotting and stock characters fail to sufficiently fill the feature length run-time."

In a positive review, Screen Rant's Kevin Yeoman praised the first episode saying, "The pacing is swift, the action is bloody and well choreographed — especially the showdown in a funeral home — and the characters (i.e., the victims) all have just the right sort of personalities that make them feel relatable and somewhat likable, but watching them be picked off one by one is still a lot of fun." In a more mixed assessment, Variety's Daniel D'Addario criticized the series, calling the premiere "not good", and panning the acting, over-reliance on gore, and ineffectual twist ending.

In a more outright negative critique, Paste's Jacob Oller gave "The Body" a rating of 3.7 out of 10 and said, "The fundamental problem is that overwritten dialogue has been brought in to compensate for the simple, clever, yet underwritten premise to eat up time. It all adds up to boredom when the potential scenarios to come out of said premise—or the settings—aren't explored." In another unfavorable evaluation, The Los Angeles Times's Lorraine Ali referred to the series as more "chill than chilling" and stated that the first episode "quickly devolves from creepy to irritating thanks to 80 long minutes to fill, a plot with few surprises and an overwrought love affair with B-movie horror." In a further adverse editorial, Collider's Haleigh Foutch was equally critical saying, "the execution leaves a lot to be desired in the first episode, "The Body", which struggles to merit its feature length run time and fails to provide a sense of personality for the series."
