= New Year, New You =

- Into the Dark episode
- Episode no.: Season 1 Episode 4
- Directed by: Sophia Takal
- Story by: Adam Gaines
- Teleplay by: Sophia Takal; Adam Gaines
- Cinematography by: Lyn Moncrief
- Editing by: Tad Dennis
- Original air date: December 28, 2018
- Running time: 84 minutes

Guest appearances
- Suki Waterhouse as Alexis; Carly Chaikin as Danielle Williams; Kirby Howell-Baptiste as Kayla; Melissa Bergland as Chloe; Isabella Acres as Kelsey; Michelle Haro as Frankie; Bianca Lopez as Jesse; Mia Clyburn as Carly

Episode chronology
← Previous "Pooka!"	Next → "Down"

"New Year, New You" is an episode of American horror anthology web television series Into the Dark that aired as the fourth episode of the show's first season. It originally premiered in the United States on December 28, 2018, on Hulu. The episode was directed by Sophia Takal from a script she co-wrote with Adam Gaines and it stars Suki Waterhouse, Carly Chaikin, Kirby Howell-Baptiste, and Melissa Bergland.

== Plot ==
Alexis and the child she babysits watch a video featuring Danielle Williams, a social media influencer with her own streaming television show and a former friend of Alexis. Later, Alexis returns to her house to prepare for a New Year's Eve party with her high school friends Kayla, Chloe, and Danielle. However, Danielle's arrival causes tensions to mount, until Alexis lashes out at Danielle for saying she never drove a girl named Kelsey to suicide. As Danielle attempts to shift the conversation, Alexis waterboards her with champagne, counts down to midnight, and then tells the other girls to tie Danielle up like they all agreed to.

With Danielle tied up, Alexis berates her for bullying each of them, then reveals she intends to sabotage Danielle's career by recording her confessing to her role in Kelsey's suicide. When Danielle avoids accepting the blame for the bullying, Alexis violently messes up Danielle's face and hair to make her more "camera-ready." Kayla, overwhelmed, leaves the room to FaceTime her girlfriend, Frankie. Alexis follows Kayla, and Danielle convinces Chloe to free her by offering Chloe her spot on the YouTube channel she will be leaving. When Alexis and Kayla return, Danielle knocks Alexis out.

Danielle and Chloe lock Alexis and Kayla inside a sauna, intending to wait until they die before calling the cops to make the deaths seem accidental. Alexis and Kayla discover a champagne bottle and, using it to smash the sauna's window, nearly escape but run into Danielle and Chloe. They hide in Alexis's closet before Alexis leaves to find her phone, leaving Kayla alone. Chloe finds Kayla, who tries to convince her to walk away and keep everything secret, but she claims Kayla doesn't want her to succeed and accidentally kills her. Meanwhile, Danielle corners Alexis and cuts her calf, but Alexis gets away.

A shaken Chloe comes down to meet Danielle while Alexis tends to her wound. Frankie arrives looking for Kayla because she didn't answer her phone, and Danielle and Chloe decide to frame Frankie and kill her. After watching Chloe violently stab Frankie, Alexis runs upstairs and prepares to defend herself. When her ex-friends give chase, Alexis knocks Chloe down the stairs, killing her. Danielle then engages Alexis in another fight, only for Alexis to throw Danielle out of a window to her death in the pool.

Later on, an influencer who worked with Danielle discusses how Frankie killed Danielle after Danielle encouraged Kayla to end the relationship. Alexis stands next to her, and, after taking a moment to "grieve", she immediately becomes bubbly and films her video, happily that she now has Danielle's life.

== Cast ==
- Suki Waterhouse as Alexis
- Carly Chaikin as Danielle Williams
- Kirby Howell-Baptiste as Kayla
- Melissa Bergland as Chloe
- Isabella Acres as Kelsey
- Michelle Haro as Frankie
- Bianca Lopez as Jesse Hall
- Mia Clyburn as Carly

== Production ==
=== Development ===
On November 27, 2018, it was reported that an episode of the series centered on New Year's Eve and titled "New Year, New You" would air in January 2019. On December 7, 2018, it was reported that the episode was directed by Sophia Takal from a script written by Adam Gaines and that it was now expected to premiere on December 28, 2018.

=== Casting ===
Simultaneously with the announcement of the director, it was confirmed that the episode would star Suki Waterhouse, Carly Chaikin, Kirby Howell-Baptiste, and Melissa Bergland.

=== Filming ===
Principal photography for the episode took place over the course of fifteen days between July and August 2018.

== Release ==
On December 12, 2018, a series of images from the episode were released. On December 17, 2018, the official trailer for the episode was released. On December 24, 2018, a clip from the episode was released. On December 28, 2018, two behind-the-scenes featurettes discussing the episode were released.

== Reception ==
The episode was met with a positive response from critics upon its premiere. On the review aggregation website Rotten Tomatoes, the episode holds an 89% approval rating with an average rating of 5.75 out of 10 based on 9 reviews. The website's critical consensus reads, "Though it starts slowly, "New Year, New You" builds into a twisty, chilling narrative that will please horror fans and millennials alike."

In a positive review, 1428 Elm's Luke Lucas praised the episode saying, "I highly recommend it. The acting is multilayered and shows us the four distinct paths of the characters. The narrative is driven by Takal’s script revisions and direction. Stream "New Year New You" and live your best life." In a similarly favorable analysis, Bloody Disgusting's Daniel Kurland awarded the episode four skulls out of five and commended it declaring, "It’s a chilling story that only gets darker and more complex as it goes on. It also doesn’t shy away from an incredibly bleak ending that makes her point with eerie poignancy. Takal doesn’t try to overextend herself and this boiled down take on friendship and jealousy gone wrong is arguably the best addition of Into the Dark to date and hopefully just the start of Takal’s filmmaking career." In an additional acclamatory critique, Laughing Place's Mike Mack was equally approving saying, "If there’s one thing Blumhouse has done well with Into the Dark, it’s building suspense. This episode is no exception. There’s an uneasy energy to the whole thing and the tense score Michael Montes only amplifies that. Only Blumhouse can show you a girl getting champagne out of her garage and keep you on the edge of your seat while watching it." In a further approving editorial, Pajiba's Kristy Puchko was equivalently approving of the episode saying, "As she did with Always Shine, Takal takes jealousy/female rivalry/and frenemies to an extreme end but ratchets up the tension and madness with such steadiness that it's impossible to write it off as absurd. Her heroines are the frog in the slow boil pot, not aware of the danger until it's too late. And we are their horrified witnesses, who fear not just the story unfolding, but also the dark truths at its core." In a separate complimentary evaluation, Decider's Jade Budowski lauded the episode saying, "Takal deftly integrates themes of toxic self-care culture and the often-volatile nature of female friendships, and tosses in some biting satire and terrifying twists and turns for good measure. She knows what she’s good at and uses it to her advantage, creating something equally special and unsettling with her central foursome and their gradual unhinging."

In a more mixed assessment, RogerEbert.com's Brian Tallerico gave the episode a rating of 2 ½ stars out of 4 and said, "Sadly, like so many independent horror movies, the climax of "New Year, New You" falters. It's clunky both in concept and execution, and then followed by a cheap stinger that will make the film dissipate from memory more quickly than if it had really landed its punch. Still, given how January is the month when studios dump awful horror movies they couldn't get out before awards season, this isn't a bad way for genre nuts to start the new year." In an outright negative appraisal, Paste's Jacob Oller criticized the episode saying, "Takal's directorial ability may keep "New Year, New You" from being the worst Into the Dark yet, but the dull tropes, scene-chomping acting, and hole-riddled plotting at its core are resolutely rotten."
