= Natalie Martinez =

American actress and model (born 1984)

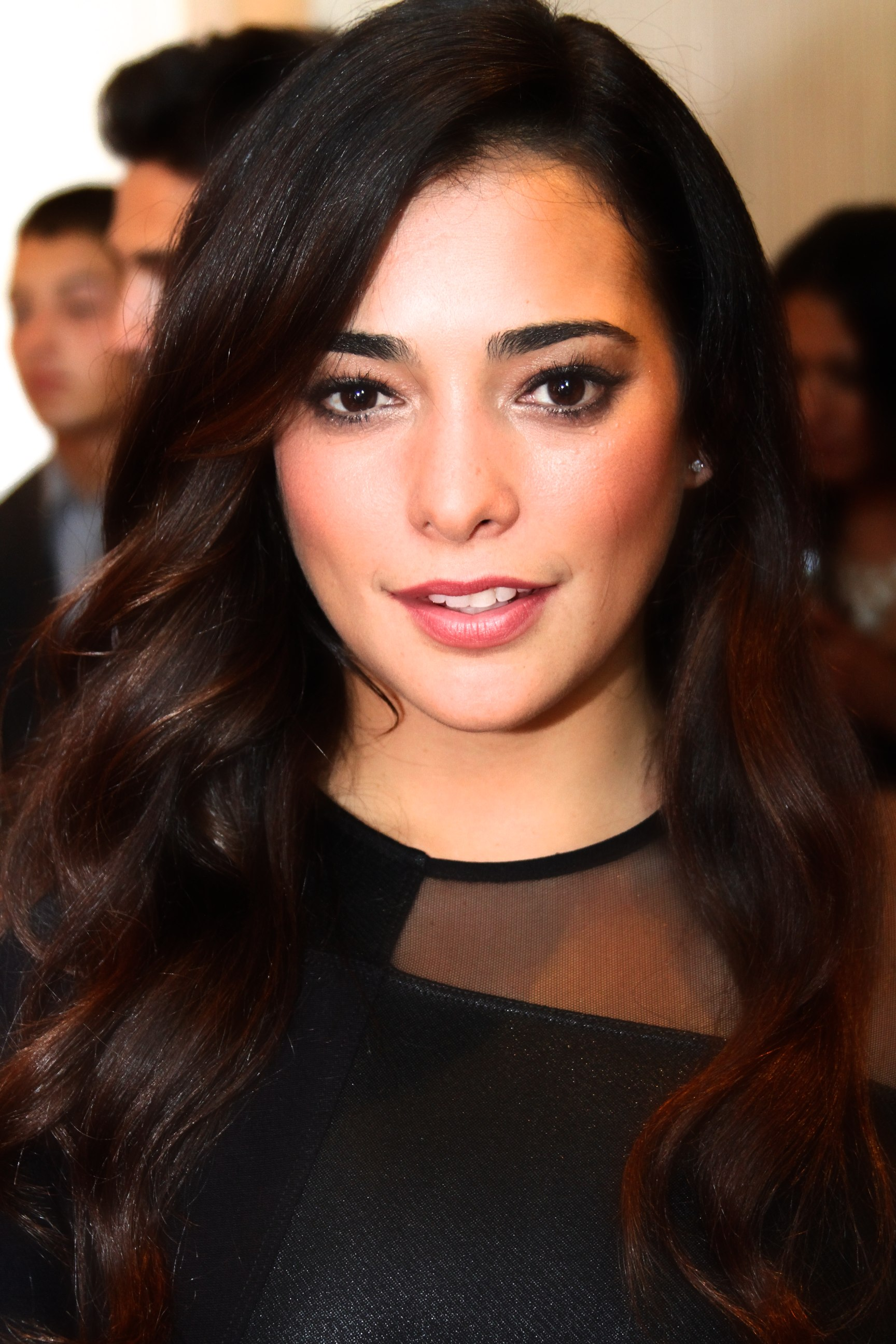
- Martinez at the 2013 Imagen Awards
- Born: July 12, 1984 (age 42); Miami, Florida
- Occupations: Actress, model
- Years active: 2002–present

Natalie Martinez (born July 12, 1984) is an American actress and model. She appeared in the 2008 film Death Race, several music videos between 2003 and 2011, and two short-lived telenovelas in 2006 and 2007. Martinez starred in the single season of the crime drama Detroit 1-8-7, had a recurring role for one season of CSI: NY, starred in one season of the drama series Kingdom, and appeared in the 2019 science fiction miniseries The I-Land. She has since appeared in the NBC drama series Ordinary Joe (2021-2022), the Apple TV black comedy crime series Bad Monkey (2024-present), and the Apple TV comedy series Brothers (2026).

== Early life and education ==
Martinez was born in 1984 in Miami and is of full Cuban ancestry. She graduated from St. Brendan High School in 2002.

== Career ==
Martinez appeared as the character Michelle Miller on the telenovela Fashion House (2006), which was cancelled after three months, and she was cast as a major character in the 2007 series Chuck, appearing in first-season promotional pictures, before being removed before the pilot was filmed. Martinez then had a role in the 2008 film Death Race.

Martinez had starring roles in a number of other single-season television series, including Detroit 1-8-7, APB, and The Crossing. In 2012, she starred in the first season of Under the Dome, and appeared in the season two premiere. She co-starred in one season of Secrets and Lies, and played the recurring role of Detective Jamie Lovato for one season in the crime drama CSI: NY.

Martinez' other film appearances include End of Watch (2012), The Baytown Outlaws (2012), Broken City (2013), and Self/less (2015).

In September 2018, it was announced that Martinez would appear in the main role of Chase on the Netflix science fiction miniseries The I-Land. The miniseries was released on September 12, 2019.

In 2016, she acted in Message from the King, alongside Chadwick Boseman.

In 2024, she had a main cast role in the Apple TV+ series Bad Monkey.

== Filmography ==
=== Film ===
Key
| † | Denotes works that have not yet been released |

| Year | Title | Role | Notes |
|---|---|---|---|
| 2008 | Death Race | Case | |
| 2011 | Magic City Memoirs | Mari | |
| 2012 | The Baytown Outlaws | Ariana | |
| 2012 | End of Watch | Gabby Zavala | |
| 2013 | Broken City | Natalie Barrow | |
| 2015 | Self/less | Madeline Bitwell | |
| 2016 | The Land | Evelyn | |
| 2016 | Message from the King | Trish | |
| 2017 | Keep Watching | Olivia | |
| 2019 | UglyDolls | Meghan | Voice |
| 2019 | El Dorado | Maria | |
| 2019 | Battle at Big Rock | Mariana | Short film |
| 2021 | Reminiscence | Avery Castillo | |
| 2022 | Wendell & Wild | Marianna Cocolotl | Voice |

=== Television ===
| Year | Title | Role | Notes |
|---|---|---|---|
| 2006 | Fashion House | Michelle Miller | Main role (55 episodes) |
| 2007 | Saints & Sinners | Pilar Martin | Main role (62 episodes) |
| 2010 | Sons of Tucson | Maggie Morales | 2 episodes |
| 2010 | El Dorado | Maria Martinez | Miniseries; 2 episodes |
| 2010–2011 | Detroit 1-8-7 | Det. Ariana Sanchez | Main role (18 episodes) |
| 2012 | Widow Detective | Maya Davis | Unsold CBS pilot |
| 2012–2013 | CSI: NY | Det. Jamie Lovato | 12 episodes |
| 2013–2014 | Under the Dome | Deputy Linda Esquivel | Main role (14 episodes) |
| 2014 | Matador | Salma | Episode: "Enter the Worm" |
| 2015 | Secrets and Lies | Jessica "Jess" Murphy | Main role (10 episodes) |
| 2015–2017 | Kingdom | Alicia Mendez | Main role (16 episodes) |
| 2016 | From Dusk till Dawn: The Series | Amaru | 2 episodes |
| 2017 | APB | Theresa Murphy | Main role (12 episodes) |
| 2018 | The Crossing | Reece | Main role (11 episodes) |
| 2019 | Into the Dark | Jennifer Robbins | Episode: "Down" |
| 2019 | The I-Land | Chase | Main role (7 episodes); also producer |
| 2020 | The Fugitive | Allison Ferro | Main role |
| 2020 | The Stand | Dayna Jurgens | Main role |
| 2020 | The Twilight Zone | Ana | Episode: "A Small Town" |
| 2021–2022 | Ordinary Joe | Amy | Main role |
| 2024 | Bad Monkey | Rosa | Main role |
| 2026 | Brothers | Valentina McConaughey | Main role |

=== Music videos ===
- Self Scientific – "Live & Breathe"
- Justin Timberlake – "Señorita"
- Sean Paul – "We Be Burnin'"
- Amr Diab – "Ne'ool Eih" 2007
- Wisin & Yandel – "Yo Te Quiero"
- Pitbull – "Rain Over Me" feat. Marc Anthony
