= Lockbox (film) =

- Theatrical release poster
- Directed by: Daniel Stamm
- Written by: Justin Yoffe
- Based on: "The Lockbox" by Soren Narnia
- Produced by: Kearie Peak
- Starring: Carla Gugino; Lou Taylor Pucci; Katharine Isabelle; Aedan Edwards
- Cinematography: Alfonso Chin
- Edited by: Bridget Durnford
- Music by: Matthew Rogers
- Production companies: Peak Pictures; Capstone Studios; Dark Castle Entertainment; Brightlight Pictures
- Distributed by: Aura Entertainment
- Release date: July 3, 2026
- Running time: 105 minutes
- Country: United States
- Language: English

Lockbox is a 2026 American supernatural horror film directed by Daniel Stamm and written by Justin Yoffe. It stars Carla Gugino, Lou Taylor Pucci, and Katharine Isabelle. Lockbox was released in the United States on July 3, 2026.

== Plot ==
After caring for her dying mother, Ellen Hershbergen leaves Buffalo and settles in Pontiac, New York, where she hopes to rebuild her life. Ellen is a former clothing designer and children’s author who now volunteers at a Catholic church. When a relative asks her to house her distant cousin Winthrop, she agrees. Winthrop is a discharged soldier suffering from severe trauma. He is withdrawn, dislikes physical contact, sleeps in unusual places, and frequently wanders outside at night. Although his behavior can be alarming, Ellen believes he is fundamentally gentle and deserves compassion.

Their neighbor Vahna gradually forces her way into Ellen’s life. She drinks heavily, discusses her abusive childhood, and repeatedly claims that Winthrop is dangerous. Winthrop appears deeply disturbed by her presence, and the hostility between them continues escalating until Ellen discovers Vahna brutally murdered. Winthrop has no convincing alibi, and circumstantial evidence connects him to the crime. He is arrested, but the prosecution cannot prove its case, so he is eventually released while authorities continue investigating.

After Vahna’s death, Winthrop begins behaving like her. He adopts her voice, mannerisms, clothing style, interests, and hatred toward a woman named Grace Beck. Ellen discovers that Vahna had been obsessed with Grace and had sent her violent threats. Vahna had also spoken about a sinister childhood figure called the Port a John Man, who apparently taught her how a spirit could survive death by entering another body. The truth is that Vahna deliberately targeted Winthrop because his trauma made him vulnerable. She arranged her own death so that her spirit, along with a demonic entity attached to her, could transfer into him. Winthrop physically killed Vahna while Vahna was controlling his body.

The possessed Winthrop pursues Grace because Vahna wants revenge against her. Ellen attempts to warn Grace, but Winthrop attacks her home while dressed in Vahna’s manner and carrying a weapon. Before he can complete the attack, members of a secret religious organization capture him. The organization has studied cases in which malevolent spirits transfer between human bodies. They take Winthrop and Ellen to an isolated blue house, the same location briefly shown at the beginning of the movie.

Inside the house is a pale, traumatized boy in a wheelchair. The boy is the actual “lockbox.” His mind has been so severely damaged that the organization believes he offers little spiritual resistance. They have therefore turned him into a human prison capable of containing numerous demons. Their method is essentially an exorcism performed in reverse. Instead of destroying a demon or sending it to hell, they transfer it into the child. The organization treats this as a necessary sacrifice, but Ellen realizes that they are repeatedly condemning an innocent child so that other people can be saved.

Winthrop is brought near the boy, and the transfer begins. The movie depicts the process through violent supernatural imagery and body horror as Vahna’s spirit is torn out of Winthrop and absorbed by the child. The ritual succeeds, and Winthrop returns to his original personality. Ellen has saved her cousin, but only by placing Vahna and the demonic force inside another traumatized victim.

Winthrop recovers and moves away. He sends Ellen a handmade gift as an expression of gratitude for refusing to abandon him.

== Cast ==
- Carla Gugino as Ellen Hershbergen
- Lou Taylor Pucci as Winthrop Benson
- Katharine Isabelle as Vahna Minter
- Aedan Edwards as The Boy

== Production ==
In June 2025, it was announced that Daniel Stamm would be directing a supernatural horror film written by Justin Yoffe titled Winthrop, based on the podcast Knifepoint Horror and starring Carla Gugino, Lou Taylor Pucci, and Katharine Isabelle. Principal photography began that summer in Vancouver, when Aura Entertainment acquired the distribution rights. By June 2026, the film had been retitled to Lockbox.

== Release ==
Lockbox was released in the United States on July 3, 2026.

== Reception ==
On review aggregator website Rotten Tomatoes, the film holds an approval rating of 26% based on 23 reviews, with an average rating of 4.4/10.
