= Into the Dark (TV series) =

American horror anthology series

- Genre: Horror; Anthology
- Country of origin: United States
- Original language: English
- No. of seasons: 2
- No. of episodes: 24

Production
- Executive producers: John Hegeman; Alexa Faigen; Alexander Koehne; Lauren Downey; Jason Blum
- Producers: Tevin Adelman; Scott Fort
- Running time: 81–93 minutes
- Production company: Blumhouse Television

Original release
- Network: Hulu
- Release: October 5, 2018 – March 26, 2021

Related
- Welcome to the Blumhouse

Into the Dark is an American horror anthology television series produced for Hulu, with each stand-alone episodic installment—labeled as television films—based around a different holiday in every month. The first season premiered on October 5, 2018, and consists of twelve feature-length episodes. Into the Dark was renewed for a second season, which premiered on October 4, 2019, and also consists of twelve episodes.

The series is produced by the television branch of Blumhouse Productions, with founder Jason Blum executive producing every episode. Each episode features its own ensemble casts and director, with directors including Patrick Lussier, Nacho Vigalondo, Sophia Takal, Daniel Stamm, James Roday Rodriguez and Gigi Saul Guerrero contributing installments.

Into the Dark was ordered in January 2018, and has been met with a positive response from critics upon its premiere. Each episode starred different actors, including Tom Bateman, Dermot Mulroney, Diana Silvers, Nyasha Hatendi, Suki Waterhouse, Matt Lauria, Jimmi Simpson, Keir O'Donnell, Israel Broussard, Aurora Perrineau, Clayne Crawford, Martha Higareda, Corey Fogelmanis, Jude Demorest, Jahkara Smith, Adelaide Kane, Reign Edwards, Britt Baron, Giorgia Whigham, Felicia Day, Tina Majorino, Judy Greer, Barry Watson, Dana Drori, and Megalyn Echikunwoke.

Following season 2 of Into the Dark, Blumhouse continued a similar concept to the series, albeit for Amazon Prime Video instead of Hulu, in the form of the anthology Welcome to the Blumhouse.

== Premise ==
The theme of each episode is inspired by a holiday during the month of its release.

== Episodes ==
Season	Episodes	Originally released	
Season	Episodes	First released	Last released
1	12	October 5, 2018	September 6, 2019
2	12	October 4, 2019	March 26, 2021

=== Season 1 (2018–2019) ===
No. overall	No. in season	Title	Holiday	Directed by	Written by	Original release date
1	1	"The Body"	Halloween	Paul Davis	Paul Fisher & Paul Davis	October 5, 2018
A professional hitman transports his latest victim in plain sight, assuming that Halloween revelers will think that the body is part of an elaborate costume. On his way to dispose of the corpse, however, the killer becomes involved with some admirers. Cast: Tom Bateman as Wilkes, Rebecca Rittenhouse as Maggie, Aurora Perrineau as Dorothy, David Hull as Alan, Ray Santiago as Jack, Harvey Guillén as Nick, Max Adler as Officer Freer
2	2	"Flesh & Blood"	Thanksgiving	Patrick Lussier	Louis Ackerman	November 2, 2018
One year after the murder of her mother, an agoraphobic teenager begins to believe that danger lurks within her house. Cast: Dermot Mulroney as Henry Tooms, Diana Silvers as Kimberly Tooms, Tembi Locke as Dr. Helen Saunders, Meredith Salenger as Rose Tooms
3	3	"Pooka!"	Christmas	Nacho Vigalondo	Gerald Olson	December 7, 2018
An actor takes a job as the mascot for a toy called Pooka, until he discovers the malevolent side effects within the costume that begin to affect him and those around him. Cast: Nyasha Hatendi as Wilson, Latarsha Rose as Melanie, Jon Daly as Finn, Dale Dickey as Red, Jonny Berryman as Ty
4	4	"New Year, New You"	New Year's Eve	Sophia Takal	Story by : Sophia Takal & Adam Gaines; Teleplay by : Adam Gaines	December 28, 2018
A group of former childhood friends get together, and find that they have not left their past behind entirely when one of them plans revenge on the other for driving a babysitting client of hers to suicide. Cast: Suki Waterhouse as Alexis, Carly Chaikin as Danielle Williams, Kirby Howell-Baptiste as Kaela, Melissa Bergland as Chloe
5	5	"Down"	Valentine's Day	Daniel Stamm	Kent Kubena	February 1, 2019
Two office workers become stuck in an elevator. Romance appears ready to blossom, until events take a dark turn. Cast: Matt Lauria as Guy / John Deakins, Natalie Martinez as Jennifer Robbins, Arnie Pantoja as Eddie, Christina Leone as Ruby, Diane Sellers as Jennifer's Co-Worker
6	6	"Treehouse"	International Women's Day; Ides of March	James Roday	James Roday & Todd Harthan	March 1, 2019
Faced with a wave of bad press, a celebrity chef bully retreats to his remote vacation home, where he finds the debts that he has incurred by his mistreatment of women will be repaid by the friends who know them. Cast: Jimmi Simpson as Peter Rake, Mary McCormack as Lilith, Shaunette Renée Wilson as Marie, Maggie Lawson as Becca Wheeler, Stephanie Beatriz as Elena, Julianna Guill as Kara Wheeler
7	7	"I'm Just F*cking with You"	April Fools' Day	Adam Mason	Gregg Zehentner & Scott Barkan	April 1, 2019
A traveler, who is secretly an Internet troll, encounters a motel manager who torments him with escalating practical jokes. Cast: Keir O'Donnell as Larry Adams/ProgrammingFlaw, Hayes MacArthur as Chester Conklin, Jessica McNamee as Rachel Adams
8	8	"All That We Destroy"	Mother's Day	Chelsea Stardust	Sean Keller & Jim Agnew	May 3, 2019
In an attempt to prevent her son from becoming a serial killer, a geneticist creates clones in order to allow him to repeatedly experience the same murder. Cast: Israel Broussard as Spencer Harris, Aurora Perrineau as Ashley Prime, Dora Madison as Marissa Cornell, Frank Whaley as Parker, Samantha Mathis as Dr. Victoria Harris
9	9	"They Come Knocking"	Father's Day	Adam Mason	Shane Van Dyke & Carey Van Dyke	June 7, 2019
A man and his two daughters take a road trip, and are attacked by mysterious forces. Cast: Clayne Crawford as Nathan, Josephine Langford as Clair, Lia McHugh as Maggie Singer, Robyn Lively as Val
10	10	"Culture Shock"	Independence Day	Gigi Saul Guerrero	James Benson, Efren Hernandez, and Gigi Saul Guerrero	July 4, 2019
A young woman illegally crosses the border from Mexico into the United States. Her American Dream turns into an existential nightmare when she and her fellow undocumented immigrants are unaware of the situation they find themselves in. Cast: Martha Higareda as Marisol Ramirez, Richard Cabral as Santo Cristobal, Shawn Ashmore as Thomas, Barbara Crampton as Betty, Creed Bratton as George Atwood
11	11	"School Spirit"	First day of school	Mike Gan	Patrick Casey & Josh Miller and Mike Gan	August 2, 2019
A group of social outcasts earn themselves weekend detention, during which they discover the truth behind urban legends that haunt their school. Cast: Corey Fogelmanis as Brett, Annie Q. as Erica, Jessi Case as Lizzy, Julian Works as Vic, Jordan Austin Smith as Jason, Philip Labes as Russ, Hugo Armstrong as Mr. Armstrong
12	12	"Pure"	Daughter's Day	Hannah Macpherson	Story by : Paul Fischer and Paul Davis; Teleplay by : Hannah Macpherson	September 6, 2019
In this coming-of-age horror story, several teenagers perform a secret ritual at a "purity retreat". One of them begins to see a supernatural entity. However, the demon they have unleashed, may be just as dangerous as the pressure to conform to their fathers’ expectations. Cast: Jahkara Smith as Shay, McKaley Miller as Jo, Scott Porter as Pastor Seth, Annalisa Cochrane as Kellyann, Ciara Bravo as Lacey, Jim Klock as Kyle, T.C. Carter as Gabe

=== Season 2 (2019–2021) ===
No. overall	No. in season	Title	Holiday	Directed by	Written by	Original release date
13	1	"Uncanny Annie"	Halloween	Paul Davis	Alan Blake Bachelor and James Bachelor	October 4, 2019
A group of college students become trapped in a board game that brings forth their darkest secrets and fears. To survive, they must play; to escape, they must win. Cast: Georgie Flores as Eve, Adelaide Kane as Wendy, Paige McGhee as Grace, Jacques Colimon as Craig, Dylan Arnold as Michael, Evan Bittencourt as Peter, Karlisha Hurley as Annie
14	2	"Pilgrim"	Thanksgiving	Marcus Dunstan	Story by : Noah Feinberg; Teleplay by : Noah Feinberg and Marcus Dunstan & Patrick Melton	November 1, 2019
In order for a family to better appreciate each other, a woman invites historical re-enactors playing Pilgrims to spend Thanksgiving with them. However, the re-enactors may be too dedicated to their characters. Cast: Kerr Smith as Shane, Reign Edwards as Cody, Peter Giles as Ethan, Courtney Henggeler as Anna Baker, Taj Speights as Finn, Antonio Raul Corbo as Tate
15	3	"A Nasty Piece of Work"	Christmas	Charles Hood	Paul Soter	December 6, 2019
After a businessman discovers that he will not be receiving a Christmas bonus nor a promotion from his corporate employer; his boss offers him an alternative opportunity for advancement — one that involves a violent competition against a rival employee. Cast: Kyle Howard as Ted, Julian Sands as Steven (in his final television role), Dustin Milligan as Gavin, Angela Sarafyan as Tatum, Molly Hagan as Kiwi, Natalie Hall as Missy
16	4	"Midnight Kiss"	New Year's Eve	Carter Smith	Erlingur Thoroddsen	December 27, 2019
A group of friends gather at a beautiful desert resort on New Year's Eve, and play a game called Midnight Kiss, as is their tradition. The purpose of the game is for each of them to find someone with whom to start the New Year. When a killer tries to join in, relationships that are already stressed are further tested, and life itself becomes the prize. Cast: Augustus Prew as Cameron, Scott Evans as Joel, Ayden Mayeri as Hannah, Lukas Gage as Logan, Chester Lockhart as Zachary, Adam Faison as Dante
17	5	"My Valentine"	Valentine's Day	Maggie Levin	Maggie Levin	February 7, 2020
Three people are locked in a small concert hall together. An airing of the grievances and emotional abuses of the past until things turn violent. Cast: Britt Baron as Valentine Fawkes, Anna Lore as Trezzure, Benedict Samuel as Royal Briggins, Anna Akana as Julie Voccola, Ally Maki as Allison, Sachin Bhatt as Eddie
18	6	"Crawlers"	Saint Patrick's Day	Brandon Zuck	Story by : Catherine Wignall; Teleplay by : Catherine Wignall and Mike Gan	March 6, 2020
Three unlikely friends try to work together to save a college town from a dangerous horde of shapeshifters. Cast: Giorgia Whigham as Shauna Shore, Pepi Sonuga as Misty Carpenter, Cameron Fuller as Aaron Hampton, Olivia Liang as Yuejin, Jude Demorest as Chloe Willis
19	7	"Pooka Lives!"	Easter; Pooka Day (Note: An in-universe holiday started by Pooka's cult that mirrors the Easter miracle.)	Alejandro Brugués	Ryan Copple	April 3, 2020
As part of a sequel to "Pooka!", a bunch of friends who knew each other from high school create their own holiday. When the "Pooka Challenge" goes viral on the internet, events take a nightmarish turn as murderous versions of Pooka start to come to life. Cast: Felicia Day as Molly, Wil Wheaton as David, Malcolm Barrett as Derrick, Rachel Bloom as Ellie Burges, Jonah Ray as Matt, Lyndie Greenwood as Susan, Gavin Stenhouse as Bennie
20	8	"Delivered"	Mother's Day	Emma Tammi	Dirk Blackman	May 8, 2020
A mother-to-be's life is turned upside down when she comes to realize that somebody she knows has terrible plans for her unborn baby. Cast: Tina Majorino as Jenny Booth, Natalie Paul as Valerie Coates, Michael Cassidy as Tom, Micah Parker as Riley, Rosslyn Luke as Instructor
21	9	"Good Boy"	Pet Appreciation Week	Tyler MacIntyre	Aaron Eisenberg and Will Eisenberg	June 12, 2020
A woman fed up with dating decides to get an emotional support dog to help with her anxiety. When she takes the dog home, people who are mean to her start turning up dead. Cast: Judy Greer as Maggie Glenn, Ethan Rains as Doug, Steve Guttenberg as Don, Ellen Wong as Annie Powell Morris, Elise Neal as Dr. Linda Johnson, Maria Conchita Alonso as Bea Rodriguez, McKinley Freeman as Nate, Chico the Dog
22	10	"The Current Occupant"	Independence Day	Julius Ramsay	Alston Ramsay	July 17, 2020
An amnesiac man who is trapped in a psychiatric asylum suspects that he is actually the President of the United States and makes plans to get out. Cast: Barry Watson as Henry Cameron, Sonita Henry as Dr. Larson, Marvin "Krondon" Jones III as Orderly, Lilli Birdsell as Helen, Kate Cobb as Eliza, Ezra Buzzington as The Administrator, Joshua Burge as The Emperor
23	11	"Tentacles"	Valentine's Day	Clara Aranovich	Story by : Alexandra Pechman & Nick Antosca; Teleplay by : Alexandra Pechman	February 12, 2021
Tara and Sam begin a new chapter in their lives after moving from Los Angeles, moving together until their relationship takes a terrifying turn. Cast: Dana Drori as Tara/Lina, Casey Deidrick as Sam Anselm, Evan Williams as Grant, Kasey Elise as Esther
24	12	"Blood Moon"	Spring Full Moon	Emma Tammi	Adam Mason & Simon Boyes	March 26, 2021
Esme and her son Luna move to a small town to begin a fresh life only to find that the reception given to them is not what they expected. When the locals begin to investigate Esme, she must protect Luna from a terrible secret involving a werewolf. Cast: Megalyn Echikunwoke as Esme Rawls, Yonas Kibreab as Luna, Joshua Dov as Sam, Marco Rodriguez as Miguel, Gareth Williams as Barlow Townes, Jack J. Yang as Joseph

== Production ==
On January 9, 2018, it was announced that Hulu had ordered a first season of twelve episodes. Each episode was set to be released one month apart beginning in October 2018. The series' first twelve episodes were expected to function as standalone stories though some narrative device or structural device was expected to connect them.

On May 2, 2018, it was announced that the series had been titled Into the Dark and would premiere on October 5, 2018. Davis and Fisher were announced as the Producers and Alexa Faigen as Executive Producer. On October 11, 2018, Production Designer Cecil Gentry revealed in an interview with Dead Entertainment that he was working on ten out of twelve episodes of the series.

In August 2019, Into the Dark was renewed for a second season. Hulu ordered nine further episodes in addition to the fifteen already ordered, bringing the total to 24 episodes. Alexander Koehne and Lauren Downey were announced as Co-Showrunners and Executive Producers. The twelve-episode second season premiered on October 4, 2019, and was originally scheduled to run through September 2020, after the first season concluded in September 2019. The August and September 2020 episodes were put on hold due to the COVID-19 pandemic; they had been filmed by November 2020, and premiered in February and March 2021.

== Release ==
=== Marketing ===
On September 13, 2018, the first trailer for the series was released.

=== Premiere ===
On September 21, 2018, the series held its world premiere during the annual LA Film Festival in Los Angeles, California with a screening of the episode "The Body" at the Writers Guild Theater. The episode "I'm Just Fucking with You" held its world premiere during the 2019 South by Southwest film festival in Austin, Texas as a part of the festival's "Narrative Spotlight" series of screenings.

=== Distribution ===
On October 11, 2018, it was announced that Sony Pictures Television had acquired the international rights to the series. Sony was expected to take the series out for sale internationally and begin its sale effort at the Mipcom market in Cannes the following week.

== Reception ==
The series has been met with a positive response from critics upon its premiere. On the review aggregation website Rotten Tomatoes, the series holds a 69% approval rating.

The first season holds 68% approval rating with an average rating of 5.6/10 based on 163 reviews. The website's critical consensus reads, "Into the Dark is a worthy horror anthology, offering viewers a selection of frightening and witty gothic tales like a tray of cobwebbed bonbons, making for a spooky Halloween treat." The second season holds a 71% approval rating with an average rating of 8.00/10 based on 120 reviews.

Into the Dark season 1: Critical reception by episode
Season 1 (2018–19): Percentage of positive critics' reviews tracked by the website Rotten Tomatoes

Into the Dark season 2: Critical reception by episode
Season 2 (2019–21): Percentage of positive critics' reviews tracked by the website Rotten Tomatoes
