= Daniel Stamm =

German film director, screenwriter and editor

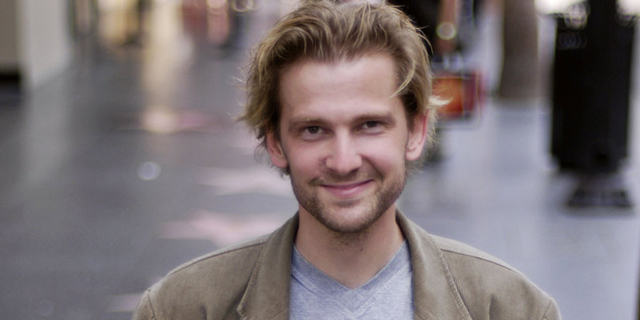
- Daniel Stamm (2012)
- Born: April 20, 1976 (age 50); Hamburg, Germany
- Occupations: Film director, screenwriter
- Spouse: Jonako Donley

Daniel Stamm (born April 20, 1976, in Hamburg) is a German film filmmaker. He is best known for directing the horror films The Last Exorcism (2010), 13 Sins (2014) and Prey for the Devil (2022).

== Career ==
In June 2010, he was slated to direct Reincarnate (formerly Twelve Strangers), which was announced to be the second installment in The Night Chronicles trilogy, with the first film being Devil.

== Filmography ==
Short film

Year	Title	Director	Writer
2000	Vergessene Ritter	No	Yes
2004	Off Hollywood & Vine	Yes	No

Feature film

Year	Title	Director	Writer
2008	A Necessary Death	Yes	Yes
2010	The Last Exorcism	Yes	No
2014	13 Sins	Yes	Yes
2022	Prey for the Devil	Yes	No
2026	Lockbox	Yes	No

Television

Year	Title	Notes
2014	Intruders	4 episodes
2016	Scream	Episode "Happy Birthday to Me"
2016	Incorporated	Episode "Profit and Loss"
2017	Fear the Walking Dead	Episode "Burning in Water, Drowning in Flame"
2019	Into the Dark	Episode "Down"
2021	Them	Episode "Day 4"
