= Birds of Paradise (2021 film) =

- Promotional release poster
- Directed by: Sarah Adina Smith
- Written by: Sarah Adina Smith
- Based on: Bright Burning Stars by A.K. Small
- Produced by: Dara Gordon; Trevor Adley; Jonako Donley
- Starring: Kristine Frøseth; Diana Silvers; Caroline Goodall; Eva Lomby; Jacqueline Bisset
- Cinematography: Shaheen Seth
- Edited by: David Barker
- Music by: Ellen Reid
- Production companies: Anonymous Content; Everything is Everything
- Distributed by: Amazon Studios
- Release date: September 24, 2021
- Running time: 114 minutes
- Country: United States
- Language: English

Birds of Paradise is a 2021 American dance drama film written and directed by Sarah Adina Smith, based upon the 2019 novel Bright Burning Stars by A.K. Small. It stars Kristine Frøseth, Diana Silvers, Caroline Goodall, Eva Lomby, and Jacqueline Bisset. It was released on September 24, 2021, by Amazon Studios.

== Plot ==
Kate Sanders is a newly arrived student at a prestigious ballet academy in Paris, where students compete for "the prize"—a contract with a elite ballet company awarded to the best male and female dancers. On her first day, Kate makes a comment about Ollie, a renowned former student who committed suicide by jumping off a bridge. This causes Ollie's sister, Marine Durand, to attack her, resulting in criticism from the academy's exacting headmistress, Madame Brunelle. That night, Kate finds herself assigned to live in the same room as Marine. Marine suggests they go to The Jungle, a botanical-themed dance club, where they do drugs and Marine challenges Kate to an endurance dance contest where the first to stop must drop out. After hours of dancing, Kate suggests they both stop at the same time so neither has to quit. When Kate abides by her promise, she earns Marine's respect and close friendship.

Marine and Kate grow closer over the ensuing weeks. Kate reveals she is from a working-class background attending on a scholarship, while Marine is the daughter of the US Ambassador to France. At an embassy party, it is revealed that Kate's scholarship is funded by Marine's family. Her mother, seeing Kate as competition, threatens to revoke it, but Marine defends her friend. Later, Kate faces immense pressure, turns to drugs supplied by fellow dancer Jean Paul, and has sex with Felipe, the academy's best male dancer. Despite this, Marine and Kate make a pact to work together to jointly win the prize. Marine also confides that she blames herself for Ollie's death, as she ignored his phone calls the night he committed suicide. Kate comforts her, insisting it was not her fault.

As the final contest draws near, Kate rises in the rankings while Marine struggles. The students learn of another opportunity: choreographer Benjamin Mouton is offering a job as an understudy. Kate becomes the frontrunner, but soon learns her scholarship has been cancelled. An enraged Kate accuses Marine of having her parents withdraw the funds. In retaliation, Marine learns that Kate told other students a false rumor that Marine and Ollie were having sex. Marine is comforted by Madame Brunelle, who leaves her with a motto: "Blessed is she who falls. Blessed is she who rises again." Marine offers to dance solo at the final contest, allowing Felipe to be paired with Kate. At the competition, Marine dances an avant-garde routine of her own design before storming out. Kate wins the prize.

Three years later, Kate is a wildly successful ballerina headlining her own show. After a performance, she is approached by Marine, who explains she still dances, mainly at The Jungle. Marine thanks Kate, saying her betrayal forced her out of her comfort zone and made her truly happy for the first time. Kate drives away but returns, yelling that Marine should hate her for the betrayal. Marine simply responds with Madame Brunelle's motto. At The Jungle, Kate dances a routine choreographed by Marine and rises into the air.

== Cast ==
- Kristine Frøseth as Marine Elise Durand
- Diana Silvers as Kate Sanders
- Caroline Goodall as Celine Durand
- Eva Lomby as Gia
- Jacqueline Bisset as Madame Brunelle
- Toby Huss as voice of Scott Sanders
- Daniel Camargo as Felipe
- Solomon Golding as Luc
- Alice Dardenne as Claire
- Didier Flamand as Francis Chevalier
- Stav Strashko as Valentine Louvet
- Gaetan Vermeulen as Jean Paul
- Osiel Gouneo as Benjamin Mouton
- Nassim Lyes as Jamal
- Igoné de Jongh as Sarah Barinelli
- Madeleine Green as Isabelle
- Roger Barclay as Lucien Durand

== Production ==
In February 2020, it was announced that Sarah Adina Smith would write and direct Birds of Paradise, a drama film based upon the novel Bright Burning Stars by A.K. Small. Kristine Froseth, Diana Silvers, and Jacqueline Bisset would star, and Amazon Studios would distribute. Principal photography began that same month, in Budapest.

== Release ==
It was released on September 24, 2021.

== Reception ==
On the review aggregator website Rotten Tomatoes, 63% of 32 critics' reviews are positive, with an average rating of 6.4/10. Metacritic, which uses a weighted average, assigned the film a score of 57 out of 100, based on 12 critics, indicating "mixed or average" reviews.

Writing for Decider, Anna Menta praised Frøseth and Silvers' "electric chemistry". Nell Minow of RogerEbert.com wrote, "Director Sarah Adina Smith has a gift for striking images and creating intriguingly spooky moods, bordering on gothic", but criticized the plot as "overstuffed" and said the film did not feature enough dancing. Heather Hogan of Autostraddle commented, "My main struggle with Birds of Paradise is it doesn’t seem to know it’s pretty campy — which is especially jarring when things swerve south in the second half of the film."
