= Rebecca Rittenhouse =

American actress

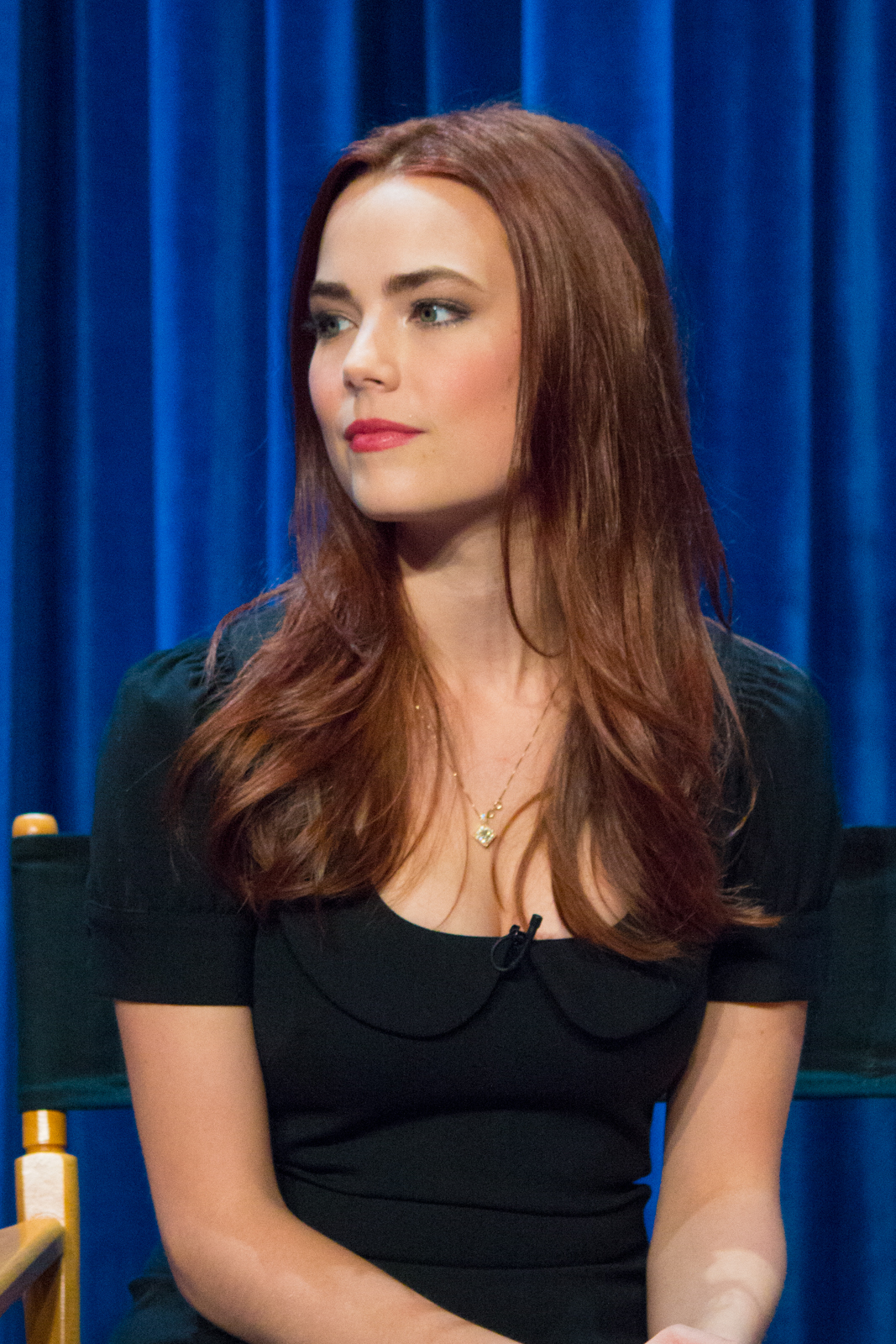
- Rittenhouse in 2014
- Born: 1988 or 1989 (age 37–38); Los Angeles, California, U.S
- Occupation: Actress
- Years active: 2011–present
- Spouse: Kyle Robiskie (m. 2025)

Rebecca Rittenhouse is an American actress. She has played Cody LeFever in the ABC prime time soap opera Blood & Oil and Dr. Anna Ziev in the Hulu romantic comedy series The Mindy Project. In 2022, she played the title character in the comedy series Maggie, which was cancelled after 13 episodes and purged from the Hulu streaming service in 2023.

== Early life ==
Rittenhouse was born in Los Angeles and grew up in Pasadena. One of her first roles was in lower school, when she was cast as the Balloon Girl in her all-girls academy's production of the musical Gypsy. She continued performing in high school, Westridge, but never thought of it as a career. Rittenhouse attended the University of Pennsylvania, where she studied Romance languages. Afterwards, she decided to study acting at the Atlantic Theater Company in New York City. She considered a career in medicine while trying to get roles.

== Career ==
Rittenhouse made her Off-Broadway debut in 2013 in Commons of Pensacola, at the Manhattan Theatre Club. In 2014, she made her television debut, appearing in the pilot episode of Showtime drama series, The Affair. Later in that year, Rittenhouse was cast in the series regular role as Brittany Dobler in the Fox comedy-drama, Red Band Society. The series was canceled after one season. Rittenhouse was one of the actresses briefly considered for the female lead role in the superhero film Deadpool, which went to Morena Baccarin.

In 2015, Rittenhouse was cast as the female lead Cody LeFever in the ABC prime time soap opera, Blood & Oil. In late 2017, she was cast as Keri Allen in the season seven finale of the legal drama series Suits, which served as a backdoor pilot for a potential spin-off, Pearson. However, the role was recast with Bethany Joy Lenz for the series.

In 2018, she starred in "The Body", an episode of the anthology series Into the Dark. In 2019, she starred as interior decorator Ainsley Howard in the Hulu miniseries Four Weddings and a Funeral, an update on the 1994 film of the same name. The miniseries was created by Mindy Kaling and Matt Warburton, with whom she had previously worked with on The Mindy Project.

Rittenhouse starred in the title role of the comedy series Maggie, released on Hulu in July 2022. The show was originally scheduled to debut on ABC, but was dropped to the Hulu streaming service, where it was canceled after 13 episodes and purged from Hulu and Disney+ in May 2023.

== Personal life ==
From 2015 to 2018, Rittenhouse was in a relationship with her Blood & Oil co-star Chace Crawford; in June 2024, Crawford revealed that the two continue to share custody of a rescue dog. In September 2023, Rittenhouse announced her engagement to marketing executive Kyle Robiskie. They were married on November 22, 2025 in Pasadena, California.

== Filmography ==
=== Film ===
Year	Title	Role	Notes
2011	Philadelphia, Ti Amo	Veronica	directed by Jeff Ayars
2018	Don't Worry, He Won't Get Far on Foot	Bonnie	
2018	Unfriended: Dark Web	Serena Lange	
2019	Once Upon a Time in Hollywood	Michelle Phillips	
2021	Good on Paper	Serrena Halstead	

=== Television ===
Year	Title	Role	Notes
2014	The Affair	Jocelyn	Episode: "1"
2014	Red Band Society	Brittany Dobler	Main cast
2015	Blood & Oil	Cody LeFever	Main cast
2016–2017	The Mindy Project	Dr. Anna Ziev	Main cast (seasons 5–6)
2017	Real Life	Nora	TV movie
2018	Suits	Keri Allen	Episode: "Good-Bye"
2018	The Handmaid's Tale	Odette	Episode: "After"
2018	Into the Dark	Maggie	Episode: "The Body"
2018	The Good Cop	Macy	Episode: "Who Killed the Guy on the Ski Lift?"
2019	Four Weddings and a Funeral	Ainsley Howard	Main cast
2022	Maggie	Maggie	Main cast
2025	Running Point	Jay Brown's ex-wife	Episode: "The Streak"
2026	His & Hers	Lexy Jones	Main cast
