= Diana Silvers =

American actress (born 1997)

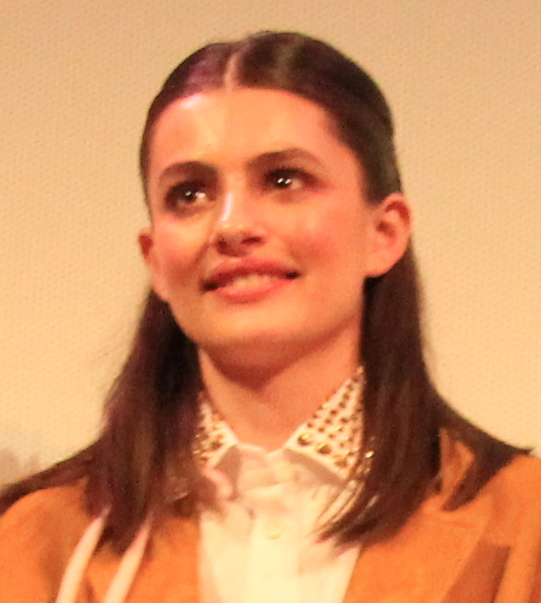
- Silvers at South by Southwest in 2019
- Born: November 3, 1997 (age 29); Los Angeles, California, U.S.
- Occupations: Actress; model
- Years active: 2018–present

Diana Margaret Silvers (born November 3, 1997) is an American actress, singer, and model, best known for playing Erin Naird in the comedy series Space Force (2020–2022).

== Early life ==
Silvers was born in Los Angeles on November 3, 1997. Her mother is Swiss and her father is of Romanian Jewish descent. She has four older siblings and one younger sibling. She began attending theatre camps at age 12 after watching the film What's Eating Gilbert Grape and decided to pursue a career in acting. By 2014, she was attending the Palisades Charter High School, where she played tennis. She attended New York University to study acting, but changed her major to history with a minor in film and later dropped out during her junior year.

== Career ==
Silvers started modeling in her teens. She was scouted by IMG Models in 2015 in her senior year of high school, and continued modeling through her time at NYU to pay for her studies. In 2019, she closed Stella McCartney's Autumn show.

Silvers made her acting debut in a 2018 episode of the Hulu thriller series Into the Dark and proceeded to appear in M. Night Shyamalan's film Glass (2019). She auditioned for the horror film Ma (2019) while in college, and got the role despite believing she had botched her audition. In Ma, she portrays Maggie, whose friends befriend the main character who soon begins terrorizing them. Silvers got the script for Booksmart (2019) while filming Ma and was initially asked to audition for the main character's crush, but auditioned for the character of Hope instead. In October 2018, it was reported that Silvers had been cast in the action movie Eve, later re-titled Ava. In September 2019, it was announced that Silvers was cast as Erin Naird in the Netflix comedy series Space Force (2020–2022). She also starred in Sarah Adina Smith's 2021 film Birds of Paradise for Amazon.

== Filmography ==
Key
†	Denotes works that have not yet been released

=== Film ===
Year	Title	Role	Notes
2019	Glass	Cheerleading Girl	
2019	Booksmart	Hope	
2019	Ma	Maggie Thompson	
2020	Ava	Camille	
2021	Birds of Paradise	Kate Sanders	
2024	The Killer	Jenn Clark	
2024	Lonely Planet	Lily Kemp	
2025	Billy Knight	Emily	
2027	Asymmetry †	Alice	Filming
TBA	Preppy †		Filming

=== Television ===
Year	Title	Role	Notes
2018	Into the Dark	Kimberly Tooms	Episode: "Flesh & Blood"
2020–2022	Space Force	Erin Naird	Main role
2025	The Abandons	Dahlia Teller	Main role

=== Music videos ===
Year	Title	Artist
2020	"Vampire"	Dominic Fike

=== Music Tour ===
Year	National Tour	Artists
2025	"Tour"	Jon Batiste, Andra Day, Diana Silvers
