= Down (Into the Dark) =

- Into the Dark episode
- Episode no.: Season 1 Episode 5
- Directed by: Daniel Stamm
- Written by: Kent Kubena
- Cinematography by: Scott Winig
- Editing by: Christopher M. Meagher
- Original air date: February 1, 2019
- Running time: 81 minutes

Guest appearances
- Matt Lauria as Guy / John Deakins; Natalie Martinez as Jennifer Robbins; Arnie Pantoja as Eddie; Christina Leone as Ruby; Diane Sellers as Jennifer's Co-Worker

Episode chronology
← Previous "New Year, New You"	Next → "Treehouse"

"Down" is an episode of American horror anthology web television series Into the Dark that aired as the fifth episode of the show's first season. It originally premiered in the United States on February 1, 2019, on Hulu. The episode was directed by Daniel Stamm from a script written by Kent Kubena and stars Natalie Martinez, Matt Lauria, Arnie Pantoja, Diane Sellers, and Christina Leone.

== Plot ==
In a high-rise office building on the evening before Valentine's Day, Guy (Matt Lauria) and Jennifer (Natalie Martinez) have been separately working late. Apparently the last people to leave, they enter the same elevator on different floors and make small talk. On the way down, the elevator abruptly stops, seemingly due to the thunderstorm outside. Without cell phone signal, they worry they'll be stuck in the elevator together until Tuesday morning, as Monday is the President's Day.

At first, the two hit it off. Guy shares his water and a bottle of wine (a gift he claims is for a client) while Jennifer shares some Hershey's Kisses she grabbed before leaving her office. Killing time, they sketch pictures of each other. As the hours pass, they decide to play a game where Jennifer suggests they should share their dirtiest intimate encounters. Guy claims he doesn't have any great sex stories so Jennifer convinces him to make one up. Using her cell phone, she records him as he relays his tale. As Guy continues, his expression becomes dark and he abruptly ends the story, insisting he was becoming aroused. He then asks Jennifer if he can kiss her, and she consents, leading the two to have sex in the elevator.

Afterwards, Guy, believing that they shared a special connection, tells Jennifer he could fall in love with her. Jennifer, on the other hand tells Guy that their encounter was merely casual and that she still has feelings for an ex. Frustrated by what he sees as rejection, Guy admits that his story is a lie. His name isn't Guy and he's not an office worker nor an accountant. Instead, he works as one of the building's security guards and has secretly been stalking her. Furthermore, he stopped the elevator with his key when she wasn't looking. He then produces the elevator key and restarts the elevator.

Discovering this, Jennifer is furious; angrily telling him he'll rot in jail, provoking "Guy" to stop the elevator again. They get into a physical altercation, which Led Jennifer to accidentally break the key which truly trapping them inside.

"Guy" eventually breaks through the elevator's ceiling tiles and Jennifer persuades him into letting her climb out, promising she won't call the police. Once on top of the cabin, however, she flips him off before climbing up a ladder. "Guy" then pulls himself out and chases after Jennifer. He grabs her as she attempts to pry open the doors to an elevator on a higher floor and they both fall down back into the elevator cabin. Jennifer is the first to recover and ties "Guy" up using some of their discarded clothing. Threatening to maim him with a cigar cutter from a gift she had planned to give to her ex, she makes him confess everything he told her previously while recording him on her phone for evidence for the police. This time, "Guy" reveals the truth: his real name is John Deakins and he used to be a successful white collar worker. He then tells her that the sexual encounter he claims to have made up earlier was actually true. Only in reality, his passenger was accidentally killed when his car ran off a ravine. After serving six months in jail for the crash he was unable to get a promising job, so he plotted the elevator incident to get a taste of his former life.

Very early Monday morning, another security guard, Eddie (Arnie Pantoja), arrives to take his girlfriend up to the high-rise's roof. He notices the elevator's stuck and works to free the pair. John, who has untied his hands and knocked Jennifer unconscious, lures Eddie halfway into the elevator before starting it and slicing the man in half. After cleaning up, John deletes all files from the security desk computer and kills Eddie's girlfriend and throws her to the elevator's broken part. He then carries an unconscious Jennifer to the parking garage, stuffs her into his car trunk, and drives away.

When John stops the car and opens its trunk, Jennifer appears to be dead as she didn't respond John's words. However, she suddenly attacks, knocking him down. She gets into his car and begins to drive away, before reversing and crashing into a dumpster in which John has dived into. Jennifer starts to walk away, puffing on a cigar when turns and tosses the lit cigar into the dumpster, causing it to burst into flames, killing John.

== Production ==
=== Development ===
On November 27, 2018, it was reported that an episode centered on Valentine's Day and titled "Down" would air in February 2019. On December 18, 2018, it was reported that the episode was directed by Daniel Stamm from a script written by Kent Kubena and that premiered on February 1, 2019.

=== Casting ===
Simultaneously with the announcement of the director, it was confirmed that the episode would star Natalie Martinez, Matt Lauria, Arnie Pantoja, Diane Sellers, and Christina Leone.

== Release ==
On December 23, 2018, a series of still images from the episode were released featuring Matt Lauria and Natalie Martinez. On January 14, 2019, another image from the episode was released. Three days later, another series of images were released. On January 22, 2019, the official trailer for the episode was released.

== Reception ==
On Rotten Tomatoes, the episode has a score of 73% based on reviews from 15 critics, with an average rating of 6.61/10. The website's critics consensus reads: "With its clever concoction of suspense, violence, and romance, Down offers a titillating story that entertains on many levels."

At RogerEbert.com, Brian Tallerico granted the episode only one star out of four, calling it the worst episode in the series to date. Writing that the script was a mess, Tallerico said "Down" fell into the outdated “sexually active characters suffer” model of the genre. In a more favorable three-star review at The Daily Dot, Eddie Strait called the episode "a fleet, economical film" whose sense of humor about itself kept it from descending into cliché. A generally positive review at Bloody Disgusting called "Down" a bottle episode that is "ultimately predictable fun."
