= Manuel Herrera =

American politician

Member of the New Mexico House of Representatives for the 39th district
- In office 1999–2007

Personal details
- Born: December 3, 1936 Santa Rita, New Mexico, U.S.
- Died: October 21, 2007 (aged 70)
- Party: Democratic
- Profession: teacher, academic administrator

Manuel G. Herrera (3 December 1936 – 21 October 2007) was an American politician who was a Democratic member of the New Mexico House of Representatives from 1999 to 2007. Herrera attended Western New Mexico University and is a businessman. He also served as Mayor of Bayard, New Mexico and was on the city council. He died of prostate cancer on 21 October 2007.
