= Pooka Lives! =

- Into the Dark episode
- Episode no.: Season 2 Episode 7
- Directed by: Alejandro Brugues
- Written by: Ryan Copple
- Original air date: April 3, 2020

Guest appearances
- Felicia Day; Wil Wheaton; Malcolm Barrett; Jonah Ray; Lyndie Greenwood; Rachel Bloom

Episode chronology
← Previous "Crawlers"	Next → "Delivered"

"Pooka Lives!" is an episode of American horror anthology web television series Into the Dark that is a sequel a previous episode entitled, Pooka!

Pooka Lives! was directed by Alejandro Brugues and stars Felicia Day, Wil Wheaton, Malcolm Barrett, Rachel Bloom and debuted on Hulu.

The episode was written by Ryan Copple.

== Plot ==
A group of friends (Felicia Day, Malcolm Barrett, Jonah Ray, and Lyndie Greenwood) who knew each other from high school create their own holiday and an internet meme revolving around the toy Pooka, the history of its creation, as well as an urban legend revolving around the homicide of its creator ( Rachel Bloom) who was fired from the toy company that she worked at. When the Pooka Challenge goes viral on the internet, events turn into a living nightmare as murderous versions of the Pooka come to life.

== Critical reception ==
RogerEbert.com, "A tongue-in-cheek update."

JoBlo.com, "It's a funny film first while the horror comes second. The Pooka itself isn't very creepy, but it's unique enough that I was down to see it."

Decider, "A fairly standard monster movie, and concludes with a gratuitous setup for a true sequel."
