= Latarsha Rose =

American film and television actress

- Occupation: Actress
- Years active: 2000–present

Latarsha Rose is an American film and television actress, best known for her role as Portia in the 2012 film The Hunger Games.

== Background ==
Rose is from Brooklyn, New York and attended Georgetown University. From the University, she performed in Theater productions for several years, before being chosen to be a part of Bravo TV's The It Factor, a show which followed her and eleven other hopefuls as they "tried to make it in the entertainment business".

== Career ==
Rose had roles in shows such episodic series as Law & Order, CSI: NY, Bones, CSI: Miami, All My Children, and The Cape, as well as recurring roles in the shows Windfall and Swingtown. In 2012, after almost quitting the business, Rose was offered a role in The Hunger Games, as Portia, Peeta's stylist from the Capitol. Rose also starred in the upcoming BET television series Being Mary Jane as Dr. Lisa Hudson, as Mary Jane's best friend.

When first cast in The Hunger Games, The Hollywood Reporter in May 2011, referred to her as a "relative unknown". In a 2002 article about actors, Time Magazine used her dimples as an example of how some actors might be initially cast for their physical characteristics.

== Filmography ==
=== Film ===
Year	Title	Role	Notes
2000	Clockin' Green	Hostage	Video
2002	The Ghost of F. Scott Fitzgerald	-	Short
2008	Uninvited	Michelle	Short
2009	Meat Puppet	Charlie	Short
2010	Neighbors	Harriet	Short
2012	The Hunger Games	Portia	
2016	Cora	Cora	Short
2016	You Can't Hurry Love	Angela	TV movie
2017	Shelter	Audra	TV movie
2018	My Brother's Keeper	Rashida	Short
2018	Holly Day	Stephanie	
2019	Holiday for Heroes	Jade Wilcox	TV movie
2024	Sugar Mama	Veronica	Film

=== Television ===
Year	Title	Role	Notes
2000	Law & Order	Tina	Episode: "Black, White and Blue"
2002	The It Factor	Herself	TV series
2003	Law & Order: Special Victims Unit	Laurie Schneider	Episode: "Tortured"
2004	CSI: NY	Girlfriend	Episode: "American Dreamers"
2006	Windfall	Liz	Episode: "Crash Into You" & "Truth Be Told"
2008	Swingtown	Michelle	Recurring cast
2009	Bones	Jenny Holt	Episode: "The Critic in the Cabernet"
2009	CSI: Miami	Tanya Arrington	Episode: "Hostile Takeover"
2010	All My Children	Stephanie	Episode: "Episode #1.10383"
2011	The Cape	Teacher	Episode: "Kozmo"
2012	Revenge	Rachel Fisk	Episode: "Confidence"
2013–15	Being Mary Jane	Dr. Lisa Hudson	Main cast: seasons 1–3
2016	Grey's Anatomy	Polly Campbell	Episode: "Falling Slowly"
2017	Bull	Donna Henderson	Episode: "Teacher's Pet"
2018	S.W.A.T.	Genise	Episode: "Patrol"
2018	Star	Dr. McDonald	Episode: "Someday We'll All Be Free"
2018	Into the Dark	Melanie Burns	Episode: "Pooka!"
2019–2020	The L Word: Generation Q	Felicity	Recurring cast: season 1
2021	Them	Arnette Beaumont	Recurring cast
