= Tagline =

Short text used for marketing

In entertainment, a tagline (alternatively spelled tag line) is a short text which serves to clarify a thought for, or is designed with a form of, dramatic effect. Many tagline slogans are reiterated phrases associated with an individual, social group, or product. As a variant of a branding slogan, taglines can be used in marketing materials and advertising.

The idea behind the concept is to create a memorable dramatic phrase that will sum up the tone and premise of an audio/visual product, (Note: Such as a movie film or a television brand) or to reinforce and strengthen the audience's memory of a literary product. Some taglines are successful enough to warrant inclusion in popular culture.

== Name ==
Tagline, tag line, and tag are American terms. In the U.K. they are called end lines, endlines, or straplines. In Belgium they are called baselines. In France they are signatures. In Germany they are claims. In the Netherlands and Italy, they are pay offs or pay-off.

== Organizational usage ==
Referral networking organizations may encourage taglines to be used as the conclusion to an introduction by each attendee. The purpose would be to make the introduction and that speaker more memorable in the minds of the other attendees after the meeting is over. Other terms for taglines are "memory hooks" and "USP" or "Unique Selling Proposition" which is a more commonly known term.

=== Difference from headlines ===
The tagline is sometimes confused with a headline because information is only presented with the one or the other. Essentially the headline is linked to the information; Once the information changes, the headline is abandoned in favor of a new one. The tagline is related to the entertainment piece and can, therefore, appear on all the information of that product or manufacturer. It is linked to the piece and not to the concept of a specific event. If the sentence is presented next to a logo, as an integral part, it is likely to be a tagline.

== Function ==
A tagline is sometimes used as a supplementary expression in promoting a motion picture or television program. (Note: Another type of summary of a movie plot is the log line.) It is an explanatory subtitle, in addition to the actual title, on posters or the CD/DVD packaging of videos and music. Taglines can have an enticing effect and are therefore an important aspect in the marketing of films and television programs. Increasingly also found in the advertising world, taglines are a form of advertising slogan. (Note: Taglines condense the conceptual message in a memorable sentence.) A tagline for the movie series Star Wars, for example, was "A long time ago, in a galaxy far, far away..."

== Examples ==
=== Film and television ===
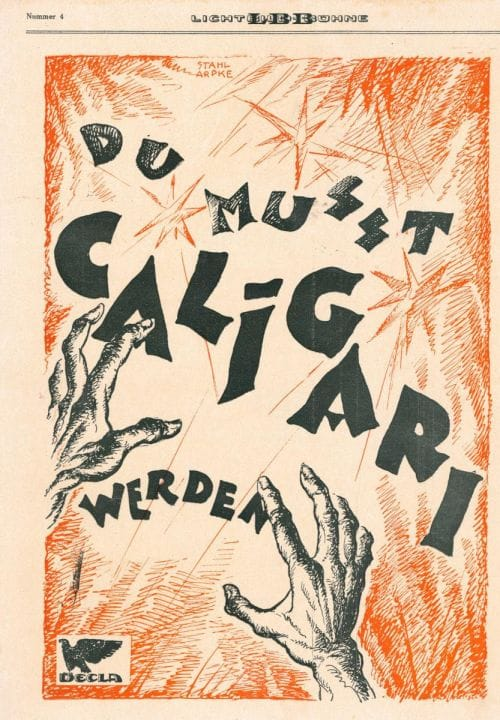
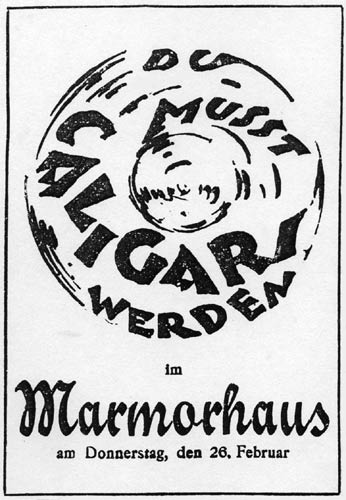
"You must become Caligari" teaser campaign posters in German promoting the film The Cabinet of Dr. Caligari (1920)
- "You must become Caligari!" (German: "Du musst Caligari werden!") – The Cabinet of Dr. Caligari
- "Garbo talks!" – Anna Christie
- "Garbo laughs!" – Ninotchka
- "Be afraid. Be very afraid." – The Fly
- "In space, no one can hear you scream." – Alien
- "Who you gonna call?" – Ghostbusters
- "Love means never having to say you're sorry." – Love Story
- "Every heist has its perfect plan. Until something goes wrong" – Money Heist
- "The truth is out there." – The X-Files
- "Just when you thought it was safe to go back in the water..." – Jaws 2
- "Nothing on earth could come between them." – Titanic
- "Trapped in time. Surrounded by evil. Low on gas." – Army of Darkness
- "Some houses are born bad." – The Haunting
- "It knows what scares you." – Poltergeist
- "We are not alone." – Close Encounters of the Third Kind
- "The first casualty of war is innocence." – Platoon
- "You'll believe a man can fly." – Superman
- "Hell holds no surprises for them..." – The Devils
- "This time, it's personal." – Jaws: The Revenge
- "Act like you own the place." – Parasite
- "Prepare for the ride of your life." - Extraction 2
- "The most violent men called one man the most violent." - Salaar: Part 1 – Ceasefire

=== Video games ===
- "Finish the Fight." – Halo 3
- "The gears of war are lubricated by the blood of soldiers" – Gears of War
- "One giant step on mankind" – Destroy All Humans!
- "Sinners welcome." – Saints Row
- "It's the Zombie Apocalypse. Bring friends." – Left 4 Dead
- "Some mountains are scaled. Others are slain." – Shadow of the Colossus
- "Prepare to die" – Dark Souls
- "Go beyond death" – Dark Souls II
- "Only embers remain..." – Dark Souls III
- "War. War never changes" – Fallout
- "Go to Hell" – Dante's Inferno
- "Revenge solves everything" – Dishonored
- "Lose your mind. Eat your crew." – Sunless Sea
- "This world doesn't need a hero, it needs a professional." – The Witcher 3: Wild Hunt
- "Good Night. Good Luck." – Dying Light
- "And so the nightly hunt begins..." – Bloodborne
- "Our story begins at the end of the world." – Everybody's Gone to the Rapture
- "Prepare to drop" – Halo 3: ODST
- "Murder your maker." – Prototype 2
- "Remember Reach" – Halo: Reach
- "'Dilemma' doesn't begin to describe it." – Mass Effect
- "Run. Think. Shoot. Live." – Half-Life
- "John Romero's about to make you his bitch." – Daikatana
- "Everybody dies." – DEFCON
- "Kill with skill." – Bulletstorm
- "Bring us the girl, wipe away the debt." – BioShock Infinite
- "Welcome home." – Fallout 4
- "Rise up" – Street Fighter V
- "Brothers to the end." – Gears of War 3
- "Stand tall, and shake the Heavens!" – Xenogears
- "Fear the Future" – Metro 2033
- "Everything is true." – The Secret World
- "Outlaws to the end." – Red Dead Redemption
- "Let's challenge you to Play Better" – PUBG
- "Anton would not be pleased" - Far Cry 6

=== Novels ===
- "Power is a dangerous game." – Red Queen by Victoria Aveyard
- "Their dark and troubled loves could flourish only in secret." – Women in the Shadows by Ann Bannon
- "A novel of love—lost and found." – Emmy & Oliver by Robin Benway
- "Your next phone call could be your last." – Party Line by A. Bates
- "Growing up is tough. Period." – Are You There God? It's Me, Margaret. by Judy Blume
- "...the temperature at which books burn." – Fahrenheit 451 by Ray Bradbury
- "She had six husbands, money—and one lover too many." The Long Goodbye by Raymond Chandler
- "Afraid to face life she risked a terrible death." – Destination Unknown by Agatha Christie
- "A breath-taking novel about the future evolution of man." – Childhood's End by Arthur C. Clarke
- "For the dead, war never ends." – Gemini Cell by Myke Cole
- "There are two sides to every story." – Gone Girl by Gillian Flynn
- "A novel of an evil man...and a weak one...and their terrible bargain." – Strangers on a Train by Patricia Highsmith
- "A one-way ticket...to terror." – The Train by Diane Hoh
- "A hard-boiled mystery story, tougher than a ten-minute egg." – The Double Take by Roy Huggins
- "Would she learn the dead man's secret?" – The Colorado Kid by Stephen King
- "One day with Bonny Lee was like a three-year lease on a harem." – The Girl, the Gold Watch & Everything by John D. MacDonald
- "One boy helps her remember. The other lets her forget." – The Sky Is Everywhere by Jandy Nelson
- "Death came along for the ride." – Road to Nowhere by Christopher Pike
- "Half Boy. Half God. All Hero." – Percy Jackson and the Lightning Thief by Rick Riordan
- "One choice can transform you." – Divergent by Veronica Roth
- "The shocking novel of the fight racket." – The Harder They Fall by Budd Schulberg
- "That's when he always kills them." – First Date by R. L. Stine
- "Change begins with a whisper." – The Help by Kathryn Stockett
- "A savage novel of crime and lust in a big city hotel." – A Swell-Looking Babe by Jim Thompson

=== E-texts ===
Websites also often have taglines. The Usenet use taglines as short description of a newsgroup. The term is used in computing to represent aphorisms, maxims, graffiti or other slogans.

In electronic texts, a tag or tagline is short, concise sentences in a row that are used when sending e-mail instead of an electronic signature. The tagline is used in computing with the meaning of a "signature" to be affixed at the end of each message. In the late eighties and early nineties, when the amateur computer network FidoNet began to flourish, the messages that were exchanged between users often had a tag-line, which was no longer than 79 characters, containing a brief phrase (often witty or humorous).

== See also ==
- Byline
- Catchphrase
- Hook (music)
- Jingle
- Slogan
- Subliminal stimuli
- Subtext
- Subtitle
- Trope
