= Adelaide Kane =

Australian actress and model (born 1990)

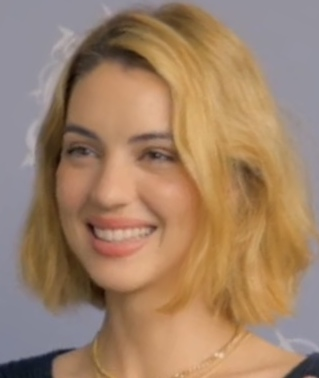
- Kane in 2021
- Born: Adelaide Victoria Kane; 9 August 1990 (age 36); Claremont, Western Australia, Australia
- Education: St Hilda's Anglican School for Girls
- Occupations: Actress; model
- Years active: 2006–present
- Known for: Reign; Teen Wolf; Once Upon a Time; Grey's Anatomy

Adelaide Victoria Kane (born 9 August 1990) is an Australian actress and model. She first gained recognition for her roles as Lolly Allen in the soap opera Neighbours and Tenaya 7 (later Tenaya 15) in the children's series Power Rangers RPM. She went on to star as Mary, Queen of Scots, in the American CW period drama Reign; as Cora Hale in the third season of the MTV series Teen Wolf and Drizella in the ABC series Once Upon a Time; and currently stars as Dr. Jules Millin on the ABC medical drama series Grey's Anatomy.

== Early life ==
Adelaide Victoria Kane was born on 9 August 1990 in Claremont, a suburb of Perth, Western Australia. Her Scottish father (Kane is a Sept of Clan MacMillan) was originally from Glasgow, while her mother is an Australian of Scottish, Irish and French descent, with her tartan being Royal Stuart.

Kane's parents divorced when she was seven, and she and her younger brother, then four, were raised by their single mother after their father returned to England. She grew up in Perth and attended St Hilda's Anglican School for Girls.

When she joined the cast of Neighbours, she and her mother moved to Melbourne, while her brother and stepfather remained in Perth.

She has stated that when she first moved to Los Angeles, she struggled financially and was "broke as a joke."

== Career ==
Adelaide Kane as Lolly Allen

In August 2006, Kane was picked to join the cast of Neighbours as Lolly Allen after she entered a competition run by Dolly magazine. She was given a three-month contract with the show. Her friends convinced her to enter the competition, but she did not think she was actually going to get the role. In December 2006, Kane announced that she would be leaving the show after her contract was not renewed. At the time of the announcement, Kane had not yet appeared as Lolly. In 2008, Kane was nominated for a Logie Award for Most Popular New Female Talent for her performance as Lolly.

From March to December 2009, Kane portrayed Tenaya 7 on Power Rangers RPM, part of the long-running Power Rangers franchise.

In April 2010, at the age of 19, Kane starred in the television film Secrets of the Mountain on NBC.

In 2012, Kane portrayed Aubrey in the film Goats. On 28 November 2012 it was announced that Kane had joined the cast of Teen Wolf as Cora Hale.

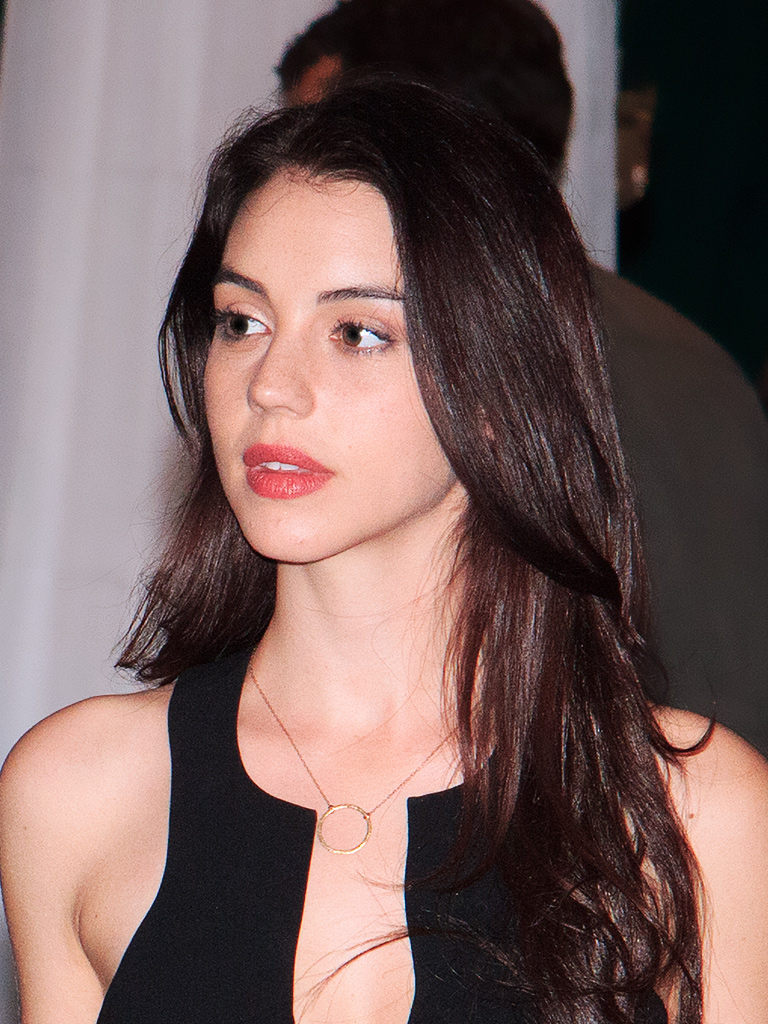
Adelaide Kane in September 2013

In February 2013, Kane was cast as Mary, Queen of Scots in the CW period drama series Reign. The same year, she appeared in the successful thriller film The Purge.

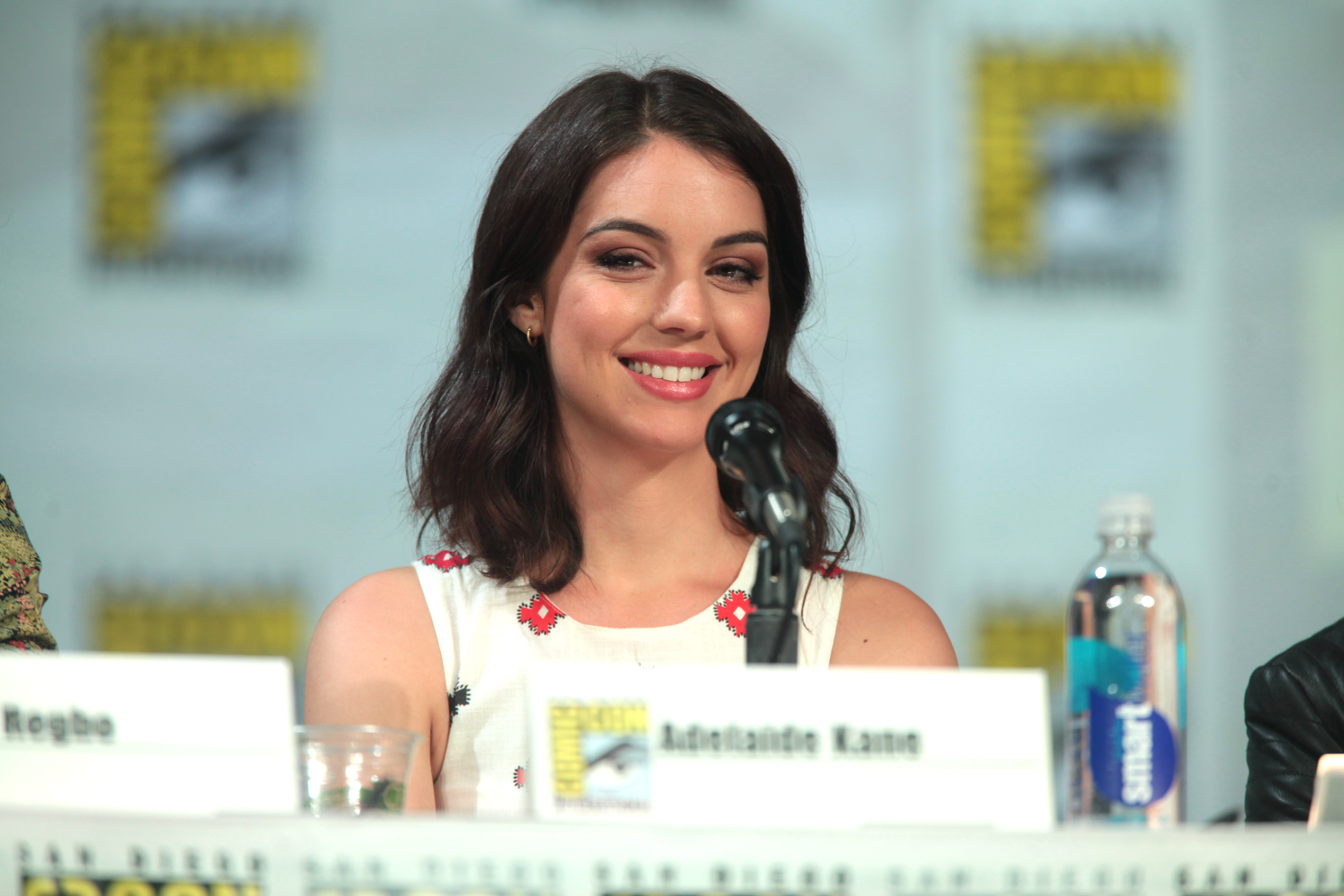
Adelaide Kane at the 2014 San Diego Comic-Con International

In 2014, Kane appeared in the horror film The Devil's Hand as Ruth. She originally auditioned for Alycia Debnam-Carey's role, but producers thought she was not right for the part, so they offered her Ruth, who got more along with her personality. Kane starred in Scott Speer's short thriller film Realm in 2015.

In June 2016, Kane joined the cast of Dragons: Race to the Edge as the voice of Mala, Queen of the Defenders of the Wing.

In July 2017, Kane joined the hit ABC series Once Upon A Time in a recurring role for its reboot season seven. Kane was one of five actresses to join the series for its new season in starring and recurring roles, following the exits of six key cast members at the end of season six. She played one of the antagonists, Drizella, one of Cinderella's wicked stepsisters. Kane's final episode in Once Upon a Time was "Sisterhood".

In September 2019, Kane was announced as one of the cast members of Into the Dark's second Halloween installment, Uncanny Annie, which premiered on Hulu the following month. She did some coaching sessions to prepare and soften up for the role. Before she was cast for Uncanny Annie, Kane was supposed to appear in Into the Dark's first installment The Body, but the character for whom director Paul Davis wanted her was cut just before the shooting draft was locked. In October 2019, Kane joined the cast of CBS's SEAL Team for its third season.

In March 2020, Kane joined the main cast of the sci-fi action film Cosmic Sin. The same month, Kane made a cameo in NBC's This Is Us' season four finale as Hailey Damon, Toby Damon and Kate Pearson's adopted daughter.

In the fall of 2022, Adelaide joined the cast of Grey's Anatomy in season 19 as Dr. Jules Millin.

In 2023 she appeared in second season of Star Trek: Strange New Worlds in the episode "Tomorrow and Tomorrow and Tomorrow".

== Personal life ==
Kane was in a relationship with her Reign co-star Sean Teale from 2014 to 2016. She began dating fashion executive Joey Pauline in 2017 but ended after just a year in 2018. In July 2019, Kane started a relationship with her Into the Dark co-star Jacques Colimon. The couple split sometime in 2020. In February 2021, Kane revealed she is bisexual. In April 2021, Kane started dating Dutch model Marthe Woertman. They reportedly split a year later as Kane brought her new girlfriend to the 95th Academy Awards afterparty.

Kane has generalised anxiety disorder, and has spoken up multiple times about the importance to break the stigma surrounding mental illness. Kane also revealed that she has been diagnosed with attention deficit hyperactivity disorder (ADHD).

== Filmography ==
=== Film ===
Year	Title	Role	Notes
2011	Donner Pass	Nicole	
2012	Goats	Aubrey	
2013	The Purge	Zoey Sandin	
2013	Louder Than Words	Stephanie Fareri	
2013	A Letter Home	Emily Feldman	Short film
2013	Blood Punch	Nabiki	
2014	The Devil's Hand	Ruth	
2015	Realm	Claire Daniels	Short film
2018	The First Purge	Zoey Sandin	Archival footage
2018	Acquainted	Cheri	Also executive producer
2020	The Swing of Things	Georgia	
2021	Cosmic Sin	Fiona Ardene	
TBA	Arcana	Viola	Short film; also executive producer; post-production

=== Television ===
Year	Title	Role	Notes
2007	Neighbours	Lolly Allen	Main role; 46 episodes
2009	Power Rangers RPM	Tenaya 7/15	Main role; 32 episodes
2010	Secrets of the Mountain	Jade Ann James	Television film
2010	Pretty Tough	Charlie	Main role; 5 episodes
2013	Teen Wolf	Cora Hale	Recurring role; 12 episodes
2013–2017	Reign	Mary, Queen of Scots	Lead role; 78 episodes
2015	Whose Line is it Anyway?	Herself	Episode 11.2
2016–2018	Dragons: Race to the Edge	Queen Mala	Recurring voice role; 11 episodes
2017	Can't Buy My Love	Lilly Springer	Television film
2017–2018	Once Upon a Time	Drizella/Ivy Belfrey	Recurring role; 13 episodes
2018	A Midnight Kiss	Mia Pearson	Television film
2019	Into the Dark	Wendy	Episode: "Uncanny Annie"
2019	A Sweet Christmas Romance	Holly Grant	Television film
2019–2020	SEAL Team	Rebecca Bowen	Recurring role; 9 episodes
2020	This Is Us	Hailey Damon	Episode: Strangers: Part Two
2022–present	Grey's Anatomy	Dr. Jules Millin	Main role; (season 19–present)
2023	Star Trek: Strange New Worlds	Sera	Episode: "Tomorrow and Tomorrow and Tomorrow"

=== Theatre ===
Year	Title	Role	Venue
2000	The Wizard of Oz	Munchkin Mayor	
2001	Fiddler on the Roof	Hodel	
2004	Oliver!	Soloist	
2004	Our Day Out	Lead	
2005	Anything Goes	Chorus	

=== Awards and nominations ===
Year	Award	Category	Work	Result
2008	Logie Awards	Most Popular New Female Talent	Neighbours	Nominated
2014	Monte-Carlo Television Festival	Outstanding Actress in a Drama Series	Reign	Nominated
2014	Teen Choice Awards	Choice TV Breakout Star: Female	Reign	Nominated
