= The Sky Is Everywhere (film) =

2022 American film by Josephine Decker

- Release poster
- Directed by: Josephine Decker
- Screenplay by: Jandy Nelson
- Based on: The Sky Is Everywhere by Jandy Nelson
- Produced by: Josephine Decker; Denise Di Novi; Margaret French Isaac; Allison Rose Carter
- Starring: Grace Kaufman; Pico Alexander; Jacques Colimon; Cherry Jones; Jason Segel
- Cinematography: Ava Berkofsky
- Edited by: Laura Zempel
- Music by: Caroline Shaw
- Production companies: A24; Di Novi Pictures
- Distributed by: Apple Original Films (through Apple TV+)
- Release date: February 11, 2022
- Running time: 103 minutes
- Country: United States
- Language: English

The Sky Is Everywhere is a 2022 American coming-of-age romantic drama film directed by Josephine Decker and written by Jandy Nelson, based on the 2010 novel of the same name. The film stars Grace Kaufman, Pico Alexander, Jacques Colimon, Cherry Jones, and Jason Segel.

The Sky Is Everywhere was released on February 11, 2022, by A24 and Apple TV+.

== Plot ==
″Tucked among the magical redwood trees of Northern California and surrounded by her grandmother’s gargantuan roses, 17-year-old Lennie Walker, a radiant musical prodigy, struggles with overwhelming grief following the sudden loss of her older sister, Bailey. When Joe Fontaine, the charismatic new guy at school, enters Lennie’s life, she’s drawn to him. But Lennie’s complicated relationship with her sister’s devastated boyfriend, Toby, starts to affect Lennie and Joe’s budding love.[…]″ - A24 website

== Cast ==
- Grace Kaufman as Lennie Walker
- Jason Segel as Big Walker
- Cherry Jones as Gram Walker
- Jacques Colimon as Joe Fontaine
- Ji-young Yoo as Sarah
- Havana Rose Liu as Bailey Walker
- Pico Alexander as Toby Shaw
- Julia Schlaepfer as Rachel
- Tyler Lofton as Marcus

== Production ==
In August 2015, Warner Bros. Pictures acquired film adaptation rights to the book. In October 2019, it was announced A24 and Apple TV+ would produce the film, with Josephine Decker directing, and Nelson writing the screenplay. In July 2020, Grace Kaufman joined the cast of the film, in the lead role of Lennie. In September 2020, Jason Segel and Cherry Jones joined the cast of the film. In October 2020, Jacques Colimon joined the cast of the film. In January 2021, Ji-young Yoo joined the cast of the film. Principal photography began in Eureka, California in October 2020. Filming concluded on November 22, 2020.

== Release ==
It was released on February 11, 2022.

== Reception ==
On the review aggregator website Rotten Tomatoes, 66% of 58 critics' reviews are positive, with an average rating of 6.1/10. The website's consensus reads: "The Sky Is Everywhere never quite scales the heights of profundity to which it aspires, but star Grace Kaufman proves a perfect fit for director Josephine Decker's vision." Metacritic, which uses a weighted average, assigned the film a score of 66 out of 100, based on 20 critics, indicating "generally favorable" reviews.
