= I'll Give You the Sun =

2014 young adult novel by Jandy Nelson

- Author: Jandy Nelson
- Language: English
- Genre: Young adult fiction
- Published: 2014
- Publisher: Dial Books
- Publication place: United States
- Media type: Print; hardback; paperback; e-book; audiobook
- Pages: 371

I'll Give You the Sun is a young adult novel by author Jandy Nelson. Published in September 2014, it is Nelson's second novel. Nelson won several awards for this novel, including the 2015 Printz Award for Excellence in Young Adult Literature. In June 2015, Warner Bros. optioned the movie rights and Natalie Krinsky signed on to write the script. Denise Di Novi and Alison Greenspan were said to be producing the movie.

The novel follows a set of twins, Jude and Noah. Although they were incredibly close at thirteen, three years later they are hardly speaking to each other. The early years are narrated by Noah as he struggles with an enormous secret that affects his past, present, and future. The later years are narrated by Jude as her life changes when she meets an arrogant and broken, yet beautiful boy. Jude also encounters a tormented, mysterious artist—an even more unpredictable force that changes her life, and Noah's, forever.

== Plot ==
Noah and Jude Sweetwine are twins. As they enter their teen years, they grow apart. This is partly due to their sibling rivalry, as they compete for the attention of their mother, Dianna; and partly due to their struggle to be able to understand their separate identities. Furthermore, both twins want to apply to the same highly competitive art school. On one hand, Noah clearly revels in his artistic talent, while hiding the fact that he is crushing on a neighborhood boy named Brian. On the other hand, Jude is reserved about her art, but she openly welcomes male attention.

The early years are written from Noah's point of view. By spying on her, Noah is aware of Jude's artistic abilities. However, he does whatever he can to keep their mother from discovering Jude's gift. One day, Dianna walks in on Noah and Brian, Brian then freaks out because he is still in the closet and ends their relationship. Then Noah discovers his mother having an affair with a local sculptor, Guillermo Garcia. Noah runs away and leaves a drawing of the scene with Guillermo on Dianna's bed. Dianna talks with Noah and says that she is in love with Guillermo and wants to divorce Noah's father. The two fight and Dianna drives away to propose to Guillermo. On the way, she is killed in an automobile accident. Noah seeks Guillermo out to yell at him and lies by saying that his parents were planning to stay together. Furthermore, Noah is under the impression that his application to art school was rejected. He is lost, confused and still obsessed with Brian.

The later years are written from Jude's point of view. Evidently, instead of ensuring both of their applications to art school were mailed out, Jude threw away Noah's application and only sent her own. Jude is not coping well with her mother's death. She is miserable in school and is nearly failing out. She is convinced that her mother's ghost is destroying all her art. Therefore, she finds Guillermo Garcia, whom she convinces to take her on as an apprentice. Jude wants to make stone sculptures that, she believes, her mother will be unable to demolish. Meanwhile, Jude finds herself hopelessly attracted to Oscar, a British boy whom Guillermo views as a son. Oscar flirts with Jude but she does not allow it to go far because she has sworn off boys. The day Dianna died, Jude was having sex for the first time. The experience was awful and Jude feels responsible for her mother's death.

Working on her stone sculpture helps Jude process her problems. She knows that she needs to tell Noah about what she did with his art school application. Meanwhile, Noah has discovered that Guillermo is Jude's mentor. He is concerned that Jude will learn that Noah was responsible for their mother's accident. Hopelessly, Noah gets drunk during a drinking game and nearly commits suicide by jumping off a cliff. However, Jude and Oscar stop him. The twins talk and reveal all their secrets to each other. Noah reveals Dianna's affair with Guillermo and Jude tells him about the sabotaged art application. Guillermo is relieved Dianna still loved him when she died and wants to continue to mentor Jude. Oscar and Jude admit to their feelings for each other. Noah is finally accepted into art school, and he gets back together with Brian who is now openly gay. With all their misunderstandings cleared up, the twins are ready to reconnect and rebuild their relationship.

== Background ==
When asked where she got the idea for I'll Give You the Sun, Nelson responds, "These characters – Jude and Noah – pretty much crash-landed in my brain, almost fully formed. They brought with them this tragedy and their 'first love' stories ... The challenge became how to tell their really complicated story, because there is a lot going on between and among all these characters." Nelson talks about the different writing process she used with this novel, saying, "The Sky Is Everywhere I wrote like a normal person, but for this book I wrote the entire thing in a pitch-black room with earplugs in. The only available light was the light coming from the computer screen ... There was something about being in that dark room like a lunatic, not letting my world in at all, that allowed me to stay in their story."

== Reception ==
I'll Give You the Sun received strongly positive reviews. The New York Times praised the novel by calling it "... breathtaking. You get the sense her characters are bursting through the words, breaking free of normal metaphors and constructions, jubilantly trying to rise up from the prison of language." The Guardian said that I'll Give You the Sun is "... about many things: grief, sexuality, creativity, bravery, identity, guilt. But mostly it's about love ... This book will make you realize how beautiful words can be."

== Awards ==
- Winner of the 2015 Michael L. Printz Award
- A 2015 Stonewall Book Award Honor Book
- Winner of Bank Street's 2015 Josette Frank Award
- ALA Best Fiction for Young Adults
- ALA Rainbow Book List Top Ten 2015
