= My Sister (2014 film) =

- Directed by: David Lascher
- Written by: Todd Camhe; David Lascher
- Produced by: Todd Camhe; David Lascher; Peter Winther
- Starring: Reid Scott; Grace Kaufman; Serinda Swan; Barbara Hershey
- Cinematography: Eduardo Enrique Mayén
- Edited by: George Folsey Jr.
- Release date: April 25, 2014 (Tribeca)
- Running time: 109 minutes
- Country: United States
- Language: English

My Sister (originally released as Sister) is a 2014 American drama film directed by David Lascher and starring Reid Scott, Grace Kaufman, Serinda Swan and Barbara Hershey.

== Cast ==
- Reid Scott as Billy Presser
- Serinda Swan as Melissa
- Grace Kaufman as Niki Presser
- Illeana Douglas as Aunt Connie
- Alexis Dziena as Ashley Presser
- Barbara Hershey as Susan Presser
- Nadine Velazquez
- John Heard
