= The Sky Is Everywhere =

2010 novel by Jandy Nelson

- Author: Jandy Nelson
- Illustrator: Jennifer Kelly
- Language: English
- Genre: Young adult literature
- Publisher: The Dial Press
- Publication date: March 9, 2010
- Publication place: United States
- Media type: Print (hardcover)
- Pages: 275 pp
- ISBN: 978-0-8037-3495-1
- LC Class: PZ7.N433835Sk 2010

The Sky Is Everywhere is a 2010 young adult novel by Jandy Nelson as her debut novel. It tells the story of an American high school girl, Lennie Walker, struggling to cope with the sudden death of her older sister. Lennie becomes romantically involved both with her sister's former fiancé, who shares Lennie's grief and loss, and with a new boy in town, who shares Lennie's love of music. Ultimately, Lennie must choose between the two relationships. A film adaptation from A24 and Apple TV+ was released on February 11, 2022. It stars Grace Kaufman, Pico Alexander, Jacques Colimon, Cherry Jones, and Jason Segel.

== Synopsis ==
Lennon Walker, called Lennie or Len, is a high school student whose love for nature and band comforts her throughout the day. Lennie's mother left when she and her older sister Bailey were young, but Lennie never minded because she had Bailey, her grandmother Gram, and her Uncle Big. Bailey's sudden death from heart arrhythmia while she is rehearsing the lead in the play Romeo and Juliet throws Lennie, Gram and Uncle Big into a depression that takes some time to overcome.

Lennie attempts to cope with her loss by leaving notes and poems throughout the town, which often contain conversations the sisters had before Bailey's death. Lennie then begins an unplanned relationship with Toby, Bailey's boyfriend and fiancé, that stems from their shared grief over losing Bailey. In the early stages of Lennie and Toby's relationship, Lennie meets a new boy in town: Joe Fontaine, a handsome and positive friend who shares her love for music and helps her almost forget about her sister's death. Joe visits Lennie daily, befriends Gram and Uncle Big as well, and Lennie and Joe start to fall in love. Lennie maintains her lustful and secretive relationship with Toby, creating an awkward situation as Lennie resents him but at the same time welcomes his lust for her. As Lennie falls in love with Joe, she hates herself even more for continuing to see Toby as she believes her relationship with Toby is unhealthy and wrong. Lennie also discovers more about her mother and how Bailey was desperate to find her, leaving Lennie confused because she and Bailey never discussed this.

One day, Toby visits Lennie because he is feeling bad and wants someone to talk to. Lennie kisses Toby on the lips to comfort him, then discovers Joe was watching. Heartbroken, Joe leaves, ending his relationship with Lennie as she discovers that Bailey was pregnant with Toby's baby.

Lennie tries to make up with Joe by taking him some of Gram's roses, but doesn't succeed. Gram becomes furious with Lennie for cutting her roses and criticizes her for being selfish. Lennie realizes that she needs to change, apologizes to her grandmother, and tells her about the situation with Joe. Gram reassures Lennie that Joe is in love with her. Lennie writes Joe a letter expressing her feelings, and Joe ultimately forgives her and they reconcile. Toby and Lennie become good friends and visit Bailey's grave together to apologize to her. Lennie walks away from the grave with a smile, knowing that her sister would have forgiven her and that the only way to deal with grief is to accept that it is a part of life and to look ahead to the future.

== Background ==
Author Jandy Nelson said that in writing The Sky Is Everywhere, her first novel, daily she would "write in the mornings, early, usually from 5 am to 9 am and then whenever I could throughout the day (sometimes on napkins in restaurants, scraps of paper in the car, like Lennie actually, except I keep all scribbles) and I'd write again at night, and all day weekends." Sometimes she would write for sixteen hours or more. She said she had a feeling of "urgency, of needing to get the story out."

Nelson was motivated to write a novel in which the main character loses someone very close to her by Nelson's own similar loss when her mother died. She wanted the reader to be able to relate to others who had lost a very close loved one. Nelson also wanted to write a story where happiness and sorrow were quick to follow each other.

Nelson said that none of the characters she used were real people, and that the characters were just a "mish-mash of many people you know, including yourself."

== Publication history ==
Since its 2010 publication, The Sky Is Everywhere has been published in over 22 countries.

== Style ==
The style of The Sky Is Everywhere contains foreshadowing, in that Bailey dies while rehearsing the part of Juliet in the play Romeo and Juliet, much like Juliet dies in the play. The manner in which the author portrays Lennie's emotions is also interesting; as member of TeenInk says, "she doesn't just write it [a poem/note] on a piece of paper and tuck it away for her own sake, she writes it on the bark of trees and on the inside of Bailey's closet." Lennie's character does not simply write her thoughts in a diary like a "normal" teenage girl, she writes on whatever she can get her hands on, whether that be a lollipop wrapper, a paper cup, a napkin, a tree, or her recently deceased sister's closet. Robert Dunbar described the tone of The Sky Is Everywhere as "at times, skittish and witty", saying that "there is an often poignant dissection of grief, of guilt, and their effect on the maturing young as they struggle to accommodate themselves. . .".

== Major themes ==
Some major themes in The Sky Is Everywhere are music, nature, death, and love. Music appears through Lennie's love for her clarinet & band class and Joe Fontaine's love for his trumpet & guitar. Nature is exemplified by the "Lennie plant" (a plant which Gram views as indicating Lennie's emotions), the forest, and Gram's flower garden. Death is shown by the death of Bailey and the death of Gram's many flowers, which are all important to the story. Love is shared by Lennie with Bailey, Gram and Uncle Big, with Toby, and with Joe. Love keeps the story going on, although the love might be between different people in different situations.

== Reception ==
The Sky Is Everywhere received generally positive reviews. Shauna Yusko of Booklist praised the book saying, "Readers will identify with her and root for her to finally make the first steps toward healing." Likewise, News designer Judy Smith said that The Sky Is Everywhere was, "written for a young adult audience, [but] will be enjoyed by anyone fascinated with the randomness of life." Believeinmexoxo, member of Teen Ink said, "this book is a dramatic masterpiece." Vanessa Lewis, co-founder of a children's bookshop, said that The Sky Is Everywhere had a gorgeous cover, was an "exploration of grief, love, and life," and was hard to put down. Robert Johnson of VOYA readers said that, "The feelings associated with a sibling's death are expressed accurately, changing from sadness to incredulity to laughing and crying at the same time." Karen Cruze said that The Sky Is Everywhere will appeal to fans of Sarah Dessen and Deb Calleti.

== Film adaptation ==
In August 2015, Warner Bros. Pictures acquired film adaptation rights to the book. In October 2019, it was announced A24 and Apple TV+ would produce the film, with Josephine Decker directing, and Nelson writing the screenplay. Principal photography began in October 2020.
