= Goodbye Lover =

1998 film by Roland Joffé

- Theatrical release poster
- Directed by: Roland Joffé
- Screenplay by: Ron Peer; Joel Cohen; Alec Sokolow
- Story by: Ron Peer
- Produced by: Alexandra Milchan; Patrick McDarrah; Joel Roodman; Chris Daniel; Van Spurgeon
- Starring: Patricia Arquette; Dermot Mulroney; Ellen DeGeneres; Mary-Louise Parker; Don Johnson
- Cinematography: Dante Spinotti
- Edited by: William Steinkamp
- Music by: John Ottman
- Production companies: Regency Enterprises; Taurus Film; Gotham Entertainment Group; Lightmotive
- Distributed by: Warner Bros. (International); 20th Century Fox (Germany)
- Release dates: 13 May 1998 (Cannes); 16 April 1999 (United States); 12 August 1999 (Germany)
- Running time: 101 minutes
- Countries: United States; Germany
- Language: English
- Budget: $20 million
- Box office: $1.9 million

Goodbye Lover is a 1998 neo-noir comedy film about a murder plot surrounding an alcoholic advertising agency worker and his adulterous wife. The film was directed by Roland Joffé, and stars Patricia Arquette, Dermot Mulroney, Don Johnson, Ellen DeGeneres and Mary-Louise Parker. The original script was written by Ron Peer; subsequent drafts were written by Robert Pucci, then Buck Henry.

The film premiered at the 1998 Cannes Film Festival, before being released theatrically in April 1999. Following its premiere, reshoots were done in Beverly Hills, and the climax was changed. This would be the last Regency Enterprises film to be released by Warner Bros. Pictures until the 2006 film The Fountain (before Regency signed a distribution deal with 20th Century Fox).

== Plot ==
Real estate agent Sandra Dunmore, wearing a blonde bob cut wig, makes flirtatious and sexual calls to her brother-in-law Ben. She then heads to church where she does community outreach with Ben. As she plays back a micro floppy disk with pipe organ sequencing for the church's choir rehearsals, they proceed to have sex and discuss their ongoing affair.

Sandra's husband and Ben's much younger brother Jake, an alcoholic, embarrasses himself in his company's meetings with his boss and when flirting with secretary Peggy Blaine, who is also having an affair with Ben. When Ben starts to suspect Sandra of revealing their affair, he attempts to avoid her as he knows her psychotic nature, when they are almost caught having sex in a house Sandra is selling.

Sandra, now even more furious, is stalking and harassing Ben, who is trying to establish a healthy relationship with Peggy. At a dinner party, a hungover Jake tells Ben he suspects something is wrong in his marriage and is considering suicide. Ben dismisses this and suggests he stop drinking. The next morning Jake causes an outburst and tells Ben he is aware of his wife's infidelity and will get revenge regardless.

One night, when Peggy and Ben come home from dinner to go on a second sexual conquest, a drunken Jake angrily calls Ben telling him he knows of the affair and will kill himself if not him. When Ben leaves a now angered Peggy, he goes to his brother's apartment and sees how the place is trashed with his brother sitting on the balcony ledge. Ben fantasizes about pushing him off the balcony to meet his death, but cannot seem to do so correctly. When he steps outside to attempt to kill him, Sandra blinds him with a flashlight which startles him and sends him hanging from the ledge of the balcony. When it is revealed that his lover and brother have betrayed him, Ben is pushed off the ledge to his painful death.

Sandra and Jake lie to Sergeant Rita Pompano and her partner, Rollins. Rita doubts their story, in which a drunken Ben attempted to stop a suicide and consequently killed himself, and begins to investigate around the story, while simultaneously handling a serial killer case. Meanwhile, the couple prepare to collect Ben's $2.5 million insurance policy as he has no other dependents or living relatives aside from his brother. When Rita and Rollins go to inform Ben's boss at the company both he & Jake worked at, Peggy emotionally breaks down and reveals she and Ben secretly married in Las Vegas, making her the rightful heir to Ben's fortune.

This, however, only angers Sandra and Jake, who desperately attempt to retrieve the money. Sandra decides to pin Peggy's death on the serial killer Rollins and Rita are hunting, which turns out to be a hitman who once loved Sandra and is an actual paid hitman who kills his victims using a poison in a needle, fooling the police into believing a serial killer is committing the murders.

However, plans change for Sandra as Jake decides to put the hit out on her instead of Peggy. Sandra eventually discovers that Peggy and Jake have been having an ongoing affair and that Jake actually married Peggy under Ben's name so she can inherit the money and the two can live comfortably in the woods after his wife died, and therefore kills both by wearing a disguise to purchase a getaway car to push them off a cliff road. While the police discover the plot between the couple, they regretfully inform Sandra.

Rita, tired of always being unfairly treated with her retirement plan, decides to blackmail Sandra by arresting her if she doesn't split both Ben and Jake's combined $8 million insurance. Sandra agrees, but unaware of the hit Jake called on her, she is attacked by the hitman. Luckily, Rita recognizes the man from the crime scene and rescues Sandra.

Two months later, both women go to collect their money and enjoy a new life of wealth and luxury, and even Rollins is happy for them. Sandra unapologetically and cheerfully continues Ben's duties at the church.

== Cast ==
- Patricia Arquette - Sandra Dunmore
- Dermot Mulroney - Jake Dunmore
- Mary-Louise Parker - Peggy Blane
- Ellen DeGeneres - Sgt. Rita Pompano
- Ray McKinnon - Rollins
- Alex Rocco - Det. Crowley
- Don Johnson - Ben Dunmore
- Andre Gregory - Rev. Finlayson
- John Neville - Bradley
- Jo Nell Kennedy - Evelyn
- Will Stewart - Dennis
- David Brisbin - Brodsky
- Vincent Gallo - Mike

== Songs ==
- "Fill My Cup Lord" by Richard Blanchard
- "Goodbye" by Brian Mashburn, performed by Save Ferris
- "Chained Minds" by Jonathan Owens, performed by Casual
- "I Got You (I Feel Good)" by/performed by James Brown
- "Perry Mason Theme" by Fred Steiner
- "Do You Love Me That Much" by Liz Hengber, Will Robinson, performed by Peter Cetera
- "Propaganda" by Brett Mazur (aka Epic), Orreolondo Mallory (aka Berchee), Gene Murphy (aka Shuv), performed by Wessyde Goon Squad
- Maria by Richard Rodgers, Oscar Hammerstein II
- My Favorite Things by Richard Rodgers, Oscar Hammerstein II
- So Long, Farewell by Richard Rodgers, Oscar Hammerstein II
- I Have Confidence by Richard Rodgers
- Climb Ev'ry Mountain by Richard Rodgers, Oscar Hammerstein II
- Something Good by Richard Rodgers

== Production ==
1995 Austin Film Festival Script Competition semi-finalist Ron Peer sold the Goodbye Lover script.

John Barry wrote a rejected film score. Film Extracts include: Pickup on South Street (1953) and Mildred Pierce (1945).

Following its premiere at the 1998 Cannes Film Festival, reshoots were done in Beverly Hills, and the ending changed which consisted of Sandra getting away with all of the money and Rita dying.

== Release ==
The film was selected for a Special Screening Out of Competition, at 1998 Cannes Film Festival.

The film opened in Los Angeles on 16 April 1999.

== Reception ==
Detective Rollins, a Mormon, is the subject of comments by Sgt. Rita Pompano.

"The film, which played in theaters a year ago, is typical half-baked Hollywood trash, but notable as part of an unusually large string of movies and TV shows over an approximate two-year period that featured Mormon characters or made comments about Mormons ...generally in less-than-flattering terms." - Deseret News (owned by the Church of Jesus Christ of Latter-day Saints)

Goodbye Lover received negative reviews from critics. It holds a rating of 29% on Rotten Tomatoes based on 34 reviews. The site's consensus states: "Half-baked plot twists disorient rather than build drama."

A convoluted reworking of Billy Wilder's 1944 classic Double Indemnity"- Sight & Sound

The film lost money due to its late release and the ending having to be changed.

"...form a pattern of overlapping relationships in a thriller about a coveted insurance payoff" - Los Angeles Times

== See also ==
- Double Indemnity (1944)
- Body Heat (1981)
- Basic Instinct (1992)
- Wild Things (1998)
