= JoNell Kennedy =

American actress, producer and writer

- Occupations: Actress, producer, writer
- Years active: 1992–present
- Spouse: Morocco Omari (2001–2006)

JoNell Kennedy is an American actress, producer and writer.

== Life and career ==
Kennedy's father, Joe Nathan Kennedy was a government employee, and her mother, Joan Marie Johnson, was a member of the '60s girl group The Dixie Cups. She began her career in Chicago appearing in productions on the Steppenwolf Theatre, The Goodman Theatre and Victory Gardens Theatre. In 1992, Kennedy received Joseph Jefferson Award for Best Revue Actress for her role in the Spunk: Three Tales by Zora Neale Hurston. Since then, Kennedy appeared in Intimate Apparel, Eden, Cry the Beloved Country, Puddin' and Pete, Marvin's Room and Midsummer Night's Dream. In 2002, Kennedy recorded album with a soul band The Soul of John Black.

Kennedy made her screen debut in 1992, appearing in a supporting role in the romantic comedy film How U Like Me Now starring Salli Richardson. She later appeared in films Goodbye Lover (1998), Me and You and Everyone We Know (2005), Guess Who (2005), Dreamgirls (2006) and Fertile Ground (2011). On television, Kennedy guest-starred on more than 60 shows, including Living Single, The Fresh Prince of Bel-Air, Seinfeld, The X Files, Touched by an Angel, Friends, The Mentalist, NCIS, Criminal Minds, Chicago Fire, NCIS: Los Angeles and Grey's Anatomy.

== Personal life ==
Kennedy was married to fellow actor Morocco Omari from 2001 until 2006.

== Filmography ==
=== Film ===
Year	Title	Role	Notes
1992	How U Like Me Now	Sharon	
1996	Last Exit to Earth	Hera	TV movie
1996	Style & Substance	Adinah Green	TV movie
1997	Riot	Young Maggie	TV movie
1998	Goodbye Lover	Evelyn	
2000	Little Richard	Peggie Penniman	TV movie
2000	Another Woman's Husband	Bets	TV movie
2001	Imposter	Screaming Nurse	
2003	Hope	Sara	Short
2003	Jonah	Queen of Nineveh	Short
2003	44 Minutes: The North Hollywood Shoot-Out	Cathy	TV movie
2004	Andre Royo's Big Scene	The Sound Person	Short
2004	Collateral	Waitress	
2004	The Male Groupie	Sonji	Short
2005	Me and You and Everyone We Know	Pam	
2005	Guess Who	Winnie	
2006	Results	Cassie	Short
2006	Life Is Not a Fairy Tale	Barbara	TV movie
2006	Kubuku Rides (This Is It)	Angel	Short
2006	Dreamgirls	JoAnn	
2007	Girl, Positive	-	TV movie
2007	Steep	Toni	Short
2008	Proud American	LaKeesha	
2011	Fertile Ground	Brittany McGraw	
2014	In the Morning	Amara	
2017	The Last Two Lovers at the End of the World	-	
2017	Myself When I Am Real	-	Short
2019	Bolden	Ida Bass	
2020	Nocturne	Gordon	
2022	Una Great Movie	Zoe	

=== Television ===
Year	Title	Role	Notes
1994	The Adventures of Brisco County, Jr.	Lenore Raymond	Episode: "Hard Rock"
1994	Living Single	Rebecca	Episode: "Hot Fun in the Wintertime"
1994	The Fresh Prince of Bel-Air	Karen	Episode: "Grumpy Young Men"
1995	Hope and Gloria	Sheryl	Episode: "Are We Having Fun Yet?"
1995	The Crew	Rosetta	Episode: "Around the World in 80 Ways (The T&A of PSA?)"
1997	Seinfeld	Secretary	Episode: "The Nap"
1997	ER	Judy Munder	Episode: "One More for the Road"
1997	Ned and Stacey	Lucy	Episode: "Sex, Lies, and Commercials"
1997–98	Malcolm and Eddie	Maura McGee	Recurring Cast: Season 2
1998	Mad About You	Paul's Flight Attendant	Episode: "Separate Planes"
1998	NewsRadio	Cheryl	Episode: "Jackass Junior High"
1998	Veronica's Closet	Tanya	Episode: "Veronica's Great Model Search"
1999	Caroline in the City	Wanda	Episode: "Caroline and the Big Bad Bed"
1999	The Wayans Bros.	Famali	Episode: "Green Card"
1999	The X-Files	Dr. Amina Ngebe	Episode: "The Sixth Extinction"
2000	Touched by an Angel	Judith	Episode: "Living the Rest of My Life"
2001	The District	Prostitute	Episode: "The D.C. Strangler"
2001	Three Sisters	Admitting Nurse	Episode: "My Birth and Welcome to It"
2001	Jack & Jill	Jeweller	Episode: "...And Nothing But the Truth"
2002	Friends	Nurse #1	Episode: "The One Where Rachel Has a Baby: Part 1"
2002	Sabrina the Teenage Witch	Monique	Episode: "Free Sabrina"
2004	Judging Amy	Rose Thompson	Episode: "Dancing in the Dark"
2006	Bones	Dr. Lawrence	Episode: "The Titan on the Tracks"
2007	All of Us	Sabine	Episode: "He's Got Game"
2009	My Name Is Earl	Reverend's Wife	Episode: "Gospel"
2009–12	The Mentalist	Coroner Pat	Recurring Cast: Season 2, Guest: Season 5
2011	The Cape	Donna	Episode: "Pilot"
2011	Futurestates	Roxanne	Episode: "Exposure"
2011	Tyler Perry's House of Payne	Kathleen	Episode: "Mother's Day Out"
2011	Torchwood	Veronica	Episode: "Miracle Day: Escape to LA"
2012	Southland	Danell	Episode: "Wednesday"
2013	NCIS	Navy Commander Lisa Cleveland	Episode: "Detour"
2013	Criminal Minds	Sgt. Lynne Johnson	Episode: "The Inspiration" & "The Inspired"
2015	Real Husbands of Hollywood	Dr. Young	Episode: "One in a Bazillion"
2015	Shameless	Dr. Giles	Episode: "Crazy Love"
2016	Hawaii Five-0	Leann Stockwell	Episode: "Umia Ka Hanu"
2016	Conviction	June Dwyer	Episode: "Pilot"
2016	Code Black	Jackie	Episode: "What Lies Beneath"
2016–19	NCIS: Los Angeles	Navy Commander Susan Yelton	Guest Cast: Season 7 & 11
2018	General Hospital	Police Officer Abby Martin	Episode: "Episode #1.14105"
2018	The Rich and the Ruthless	Earthaletta	Main Cast: Season 2
2018	The Affair	Kristina	Episode: "Episode #4.3"
2019	You're the Worst	Yvette	Recurring Cast: Season 5
2019	Chicago Fire	Jasmine Lacey	Episode: "No Such Thing as Bad Luck"
2019	Proven Innocent	Amina Jackson	Recurring Cast
2020–21	All Things Undone	Tilly (voice)	Main Cast
2021–22	The Ms. Pat Show	Cheryl	Recurring Cast: Season 1, Guest: Season 2
2022	FBI	Ann Tasker	Episode: "Ambition"
2022	Grey's Anatomy	Duda Kyat	Episode: "Legacy"
2022	9-1-1	Doctor James	Episode: "Boston"
2022	From Scratch	Barbara	Episode: "Heirlooms"
2022	The Rookie: Feds	Renee	Episode: "Flashback"
2023	Fright Krewe	Marie Laveau (voice)	Episode: "The Blood Awakening"
2024	Chicago Med	Sheryl Russell	Episode: "Family Matters"
2026	High Potential	Phyllis Martel	Episode: "If You Come for the Queen"

=== Video games ===
Year	Title	Role	Notes
2006	Saints Row	Stilwater's Resident	
2006	The Sopranos: Road to Respect	Carol, Additional Voices	
2007	Conan	Argos Maiden, Additional Voices	
2008	Saints Row 2	N/A	
2009	Red Faction Guerrilla	N/A	
2013	Grand Theft Auto V	The Local Population	
2015	Call of Duty: Black Ops III	Additional Voices	
