= Nocturne (2020 film) =

2020 American psychological horror film

- Release poster
- Directed by: Zu Quirke
- Written by: Zu Quirke
- Produced by: Jason Blum
- Starring: Sydney Sweeney; Madison Iseman; Jacques Colimon; Ivan Shaw
- Cinematography: Carmen Cabana
- Edited by: Andrew Drazek
- Music by: Gazelle Twin
- Production company: Blumhouse Television
- Distributed by: Amazon Studios
- Release date: October 13, 2020
- Running time: 90 minutes
- Country: United States
- Language: English

Nocturne is a 2020 American supernatural horror drama film written and directed by Zu Quirke. The film stars Sydney Sweeney, Madison Iseman, Jacques Colimon and Ivan Shaw. Jason Blum serves as a producer under his Blumhouse Television banner.

It was released on October 13, 2020, by Amazon Studios, as the fourth installment in the anthological Welcome to the Blumhouse film series.

== Plot ==
A girl is playing the violin, until a grandfather clock chimes, and she jumps off the balcony.

Juliet and Vivian Lowe are twin sisters attending their last year at Lindberg Academy, a prestigious boarding school for the performing arts. Both sisters are classical pianists; however, Vivian, a prodigy, has already been accepted to Juilliard while Juliet, overshadowed by her sister, has decided to take a gap year.

The violinist who died by suicide is revealed to be a senior named Moira, who was scheduled to play at the senior school showcase. Auditions are organized for her replacement. Both sisters sign up, with Juliet deciding at the last minute to play the same piece as Vivian, Saint-Saëns Piano Concerto No. 2.

After finishing practicing, Juliet follows the sound of violin to Moira's room, and finds a sun symbol on the wall, that matches the one on Moira's theory notebook that she found earlier. She plays an untitled piece from the notebook, but is interrupted by Dr. Cask who tells the name of the piece, The Devil's Trill by Giuseppe Tartini, and confronts her changing her audition piece without telling Vivian.

While auditioning, Juliet enters a dreamscape and sees herself at the showcase receiving roses. She wakes up, realizing she fainted during her audition. She finds a drawing of three balls in the hand, corresponding with the tablets she took. Her relationship with Vivian is strained and she is crushed when she learns that Vivian landed the showcase.

Juliet fights with her mentor Roger, accusing him of underestimating her. The fight results in Roger slapping her and being suspended. Juliet uses the opportunity to be assigned to the prestigious Dr. Cask, who is also mentoring her sister, and later, finds bloody tampons in her shelf. She confronts Vivian, the latter only telling her that they're now "even". When Dr. Cask asks her reason for changing her piece, Juliet admits to only wanting to beat Vivian, upon which, Dr. Cask tells Juliet she is Vivian's equal in technique but lacks her passion.

Juliet is invited to the secret senior party, where she overhears Vivian on a call, telling someone she is "done fucking" them. Juliet flirts with Vivian's boyfriend Max, and tells him about Moira's notebook. Vivian catches them and the two fight, causing Juliet to run off. She is stopped by a blinding light similar to the one seen on Moira's notebook. The light stops Juliet but Vivian, who does not see it, runs after her, falling off a cliff. The next day, Juliet wakes up on her desk with several pages with Vivian's name written repeatedly, and notices the third page matches with Vivian's fall, and the second with Roger. Juliet learns that Vivian injured her arm in two places and that the injury may permanently ruin her career; Juliet is offered Vivian's role in the showcase and accepts, while Vivian is suspended. Juliet goes to talk to Vivian, but is accused of having purposely let her fall. Juliet looks up Moira's suicide on the internet, and learns that her mother fell off a ski-lift and went into a coma and her father burnt down their house and himself.

Juliet talks to Max about Moira and her notebook, reveals that Vivian cheated on him and, after they break up, has sex with him. The night of her birthday, Juliet invites Dr. Cask to her and Vivian's birthday dinner. At the dinner, an agitated Vivian throws the cake onto Dr. Cask and storms off. As her father is drunk, Juliet has to be driven back by Dr. Cask. At his home, he attempts to encourage her for the next day and Juliet kisses him. After he rejects her, she reveals that she discovered he was having an affair with Vivian and burns his prestigious trophy. Juliet realizes that the previous events have coincided with drawings found in Moira's notebook. She is unsure of what will happen next as the last page is torn out. She falls into a trance and through automatic writing produces an illustration which demands sacrifice, and in a panic, she burns the entire notebook.

Before the showcase, Vivian confronts Juliet over her sabotage and tells her she will always be mediocre. Juliet suffers a panic attack on stage and runs offstage to the roof of the auditorium. She starts to jump but sees herself in the auditorium having finished her playing, receiving a standing ovation and the approval of her sister.

Afterward, it is revealed Juliet has jumped to her death. Her bloody body is seen on a statue, smiling, while campus students walk around not noticing her.

== Cast ==
- Sydney Sweeney as Juliet Lowe
- Madison Iseman as Vivian Lowe
- Jacques Colimon as Max
- Ivan Shaw as Dr. Henry Cask
- Julie Benz as Cassie Lowe
- Rodney To as Wilkins
- JoNell Kennedy as Gordon
- Brandon Keener as David
- Ji Eun Hwang as Moira Wilson

== Production ==
In September 2019, it was announced that Sydney Sweeney, Madison Iseman, Jacques Colimon and Ivan Shaw had joined the cast of the film, with Zu Quirke writing and directing in her directorial debut. Jason Blum will serve as a producer under his Blumhouse Television banner, with Amazon Studios distributing. Principal photography began that same month.

In October 2020, the rest of the cast was announced, including Julie Benz, Brandon Keener, JoNell Kennedy, and others.

== Release ==
The film was released on October 13, 2020, by Amazon Studios, alongside Evil Eye, as one of the first four films in the 8 film anthology Welcome to the Blumhouse.

== Reception ==
On review aggregator Rotten Tomatoes, the film holds an approval rating of 62% based on 58 reviews, with an average rating of 6.2/10. The website's critics consensus reads: "Nocturne's thought-provoking themes find themselves at odds with its genre ingredients, resulting in a mild blend that isn't quite pulpy enough." On Metacritic has a weighted average score of 58 out of 100, based on 11 critics, indicating "mixed or average reviews".

Jordan Mintzer of The Hollywood Reporter called the film "A rather familiar tune", while Ryan Lattanzio of IndieWire wrote that "[Sydney] Sweeney delivers on the promise of her turn in Euphoria, but deserves better than this Black Swan-lite tale that's more half-baked ripoff than homage".
