= Whisker Haven =

American animated short series

- Also known as: Whisker Haven Tales with the Palace Pets
- Genre: Animated series
- Based on: Palace Pets toyline
- Story by: Shea Fontana
- Directed by: Alan Lau
- Voices of: Emma Salzman; Bailey Gambertogilo; Myla Beau; Sanai Victoria; Natalie Coughlin; Henry Kaufman; Anne Halli; Grace Kaufman
- Opening theme: "Whisker Haven Theme" by Brad Breeck
- Composer: Brad Breeck
- Country of origin: United States
- No. of seasons: 3
- No. of episodes: 31

Production
- Running time: 3 1/2 minutes (seasons 1–2); 2 minutes (season 3)
- Production companies: Ghostbot Studios; Disney Publishing

Original release
- Network: Disney Junior
- Release: June 20, 2015 – August 14, 2017

Related
- Disney Princess

Whisker Haven Tales with the Palace Pets is an American animated short series animated produced by Disney Publishing and Ghostbot Studios. It is based on the Disney's Palace Pets, a spinoff of the Disney Princess franchise. The series is directed by Alan Lau and written by Shea Fontana. It premiered on the Disney Junior watch app and subsequently aired on Disney Junior. The animated shorts were made available through the accompanying app until 2019 "Palace Pets in Whisker Haven", which also included activities and games featuring the Palace Pets.

== Premise ==
Whisker Haven Tales with the Palace Pets stars a core group of six palace pets: Treasure, Pumpkin, Petite, Sultan, Dreamy and Berry along with the caretaker fairy hummingbird Miss Featherbon. These Palace Pets enter magical portals from their respective Princess Kingdoms and travel to the animal kingdom of Whisker Haven.

In this new magical world, the Palace Pets go on fun-filled adventures and learn to value friendship, kindness and loyalty. From putting on a dance show to throwing the biggest ball, there's no task too big, too small, or too glamorous for the Palace Pets.

== Characters ==
=== Main ===
- Berry (voiced by Emma Salzman in season 1, Grace Kaufman for seasons 2–3) – A pale azure rabbit who belongs to Snow White from Snow White and the Seven Dwarfs, the first full-length animated feature film.
- Pumpkin (voiced by Bailey Gambertoglio) – A white puppy with a passion for ballet who belongs to Cinderella from Cinderella.
- Dreamy (voiced by Myla Beau) – A pink kitten. As her name suggests, like her owner Aurora from Sleeping Beauty, she is often sleepy.
- Treasure (voiced by Sanai Victoria) – A scarlet kitten who belongs to Ariel from The Little Mermaid.
- Petite (voiced by Natalie Coughlin) – A bookish tan pony who belongs to Belle from Beauty and the Beast. She bears a striking resemblance to Fluttershy from the My Little Pony franchise.
- Sultan (voiced by Henry Kaufman) – A confident orange tiger cub who belongs to Jasmine from Aladdin, and one of five male characters from the series.
- Miss Featherbon (voiced by Anne Halli) – A blue hummingbird with magical powers. She sometimes offers advice to the Palace Pets, and even serves as a host at some events. She was not featured in the Palace Pets in Whisker Haven app.

=== Supporting ===
- Lily (voiced by Darielle Stewart) – A pale lavender kitten who belongs to Tiana from The Princess and the Frog.
- Bibbidy (voiced by Riley Go) – A perfection-loving white pony who belongs to Cinderella.
- Sweetie (voiced by Alexandra Peters) – A pale blue pony who specialises in speed for horse racing events and belongs to Snow White.
- Nuzzles (voiced by Breanna Brooks) – A shy but sneaky orange-and-gold fox who belongs to Aurora. According to the episode "Hearts! Hooves! Eggs!", she likes eggs.
- Mr. Chow (voiced by Jeff Bennett) – A kitten who runs the feed store.
- Lucy (voiced by Ashleigh Ball) – A puppy who runs the Squeaking Ball Shop.
- Tillie (voiced by Erin Fitzgerald) – A kitten who runs Tutu Tailor.
- Taj (voiced by Gabe Eggerling) – A lavender young elephant who belongs to Jasmine, and another male character.
- Daisy (voiced by Kallan Holley) – A yellow Maltese dog who belongs to Rapunzel from Tangled.
- Windflower (voiced by Mila Brener) – A blue raccoon who belongs to Pocahontas from Pocahontas.
- Pounce (voiced by Lyons Mathias) – An amber-and-gold bobcat who belongs to Pocahontas, and another male character.
- Fern (voiced by Fiona Bishop) – A rarely-seen pink owl who belongs to Aurora.
- Barnaby Pickles – A Tabby cat who likes to tell jokes.
- Pierre the Fish – Barnaby Pickles' French best friend.
- Nyle (voiced by Carter Sand) – A naughty teal monkey who is Jasmine's pet. He is also a male.
- Gleam (voiced by Katherine Forrester) – A tan-colored fawn with a good sense of direction. Like Truffles and Daisy, she belongs to Rapunzel.
- Truffles (voiced by Cassidy May Benullo) – A clean and perfumed pink pig who belongs to Rapunzel.
- Teacup (voiced by Hadley Belle Miller) – A singing gold Cavalier King Charles Spaniel who belongs to Belle.
- Bloom (voiced by Eva Bella) – A pale pink pony who belongs to Aurora.
- Brie (voiced by Hannah Swain) – A pale blue mouse who belongs to Cinderella.
- Jane Hair – A cat who owns a Hair Salon.
- Slipper (voiced by Gracie Grenier) – A chubby, pale blue Persian kitten who enjoys putting quartzes on things. She belongs to Cinderella.
- Matey (voiced by Dani Dare) – A lavender Border Collie who belongs to Ariel. He is also a male.
- Waddles (voiced by Livvy Stubenrauch) – A light purple puffin who belongs to Ariel.
- Sandstorm (voiced by Katie Silverman) – An orange and pale yellow cheetah who belongs to Jasmine.
- Chai (voiced by Issac Ryan Brown) – A pink red panda who belongs to Mulan from Mulan.
- River (voiced by Kate Higgins) – A teal wolf pup who belongs to Pocahontas.
- Otto (voiced by Evan Kishiyama) – A light cyan sea otter who belongs to Ariel.
- Ash (voiced by Isabella Crovetti) – Slipper's best friend, a pink and purple baby dragon who belongs to Aurora.
- Page (voiced by Katherine Dillon) – A lamb who belongs to Belle.
- Chipper (voiced by Abigail Zoe Lewis) – A red squirrel who drives a camper. She belongs to Aurora.
- Snowpaws (voiced by Francesca Capaldi) – A white snow leopard who belongs to Mulan.
- Blondie (voiced by Katie Leigh) – A golden pony who belongs to Rapunzel.
- Blossom - (voiced by Madisyn Shipman) – A purple panda who belongs to Mulan.
- Seashell (voiced by Cree Cicchino) – A purple pony who belongs to Ariel.
- Rouge - (voiced by Mariel Sheets) A pink kitten who belongs to Belle.

== Episodes ==
=== Series overview ===
Season	Episodes	Originally released	
Season	Episodes	First released	Last released
1	10	June 20, 2015	August 3, 2015
2	13	March 14, 2016	December 1, 2016
3	8	June 3, 2017	August 14, 2017

=== Season 1 (2015) ===
No. overall	No. in season	Title	Original release date
1	1	"Welcome to Whisker Haven"	June 20, 2015
When Pumpkin floods the ballroom, it's up to Treasure and her friends to save her.
2	2	"A Dreamy-ful Birthday"	June 20, 2015
Berry, Pumpkin and Treasure prepare a surprise birthday party for Dreamy, but in order to plan the perfect birthday party, they have to make sure Dreamy doesn't find out.
3	3	"The Night Knight Guard"	June 20, 2015
Sultan and Treasure try to prove who is the bravest knight in Whisker Haven. After a series of tests, the Palace Pets ask Pumpkin to judge who should be named to the Knight Night Guard.
4	4	"Cake-tillion"	June 20, 2015
The annual Cake-tillion celebration is about to begin in Whisker Haven, but the Palace Pets are unable to find Lily with all of the whisker cakes. To find her, they have to embark on a mission into the woods before the sweetest day of the year.
5	5	"Throwing a Ball"	June 20, 2015
Pumpkin throws the most grand ball that Whisker Haven has ever seen, and the Palace Pets are willing to help. That being said, getting the celebration ready in time might be harder than they hope.
6	6	"Hat's a Wrap!"	June 20, 2015
On the day of the Whisker Haven Derby, one of the Palace Pets is chosen as the Royal Derby Starter. Pumpkin creates a hat perfect for the occasion and gives it to Treasure, but Treasure is not so sure about Pumpkin’s derby day gift.
7	7	"The Cookie Boogie"	July 13, 2015
When Ms. Featherbon's magic dust turns Berry's cat-shaped cookies into real cats, it's up to Treasure and Berry to stop the cookies from ruining Pumpkin's Dance Recital.
8	8	"TuTu-Terrific"	July 20, 2015
The Pets visit the Tutu Flower Fields to make their own tutus for the Tutu Terrific Parade. Petite may not know what makes her terrific, but little does she know that her best friends do.
9	9	"Harvest Haven"	July 27, 2015
It's time for the Annual Harvest in Whisker Haven. As the pets try to find enough biscuits for the Critterzens, Treasure and Sultan compete to find the most biscuits, while Petite searches with a plan of her own.
10	10	"Flying High Tea"	August 3, 2015
Sultan's eager to try Berry's biscuits, but his prizes treats are only available for the Pets' tea party. The rambunctious tiger joins the event, but unfortunately, the tea party attendance comes with strict rules.

=== Season 2 (2016) ===
No. overall	No. in season	Title	Original release date
11	1	"Hearts! Hooves! Eggs!"	March 14, 2016
Treasure, Sultan, Taj, and Nuzzles decide to go on an Easter egg hunt.
12	2	"Pets on the Hunt!"	March 23, 2016
The Palace Pets go on a scavenger hunt.
13	3	"Whisker Haven Masquerade"	March 30, 2016
The Palace Pets go to the Whisker Haven Masquerade.
14	4	"Chowing Down"	April 5, 2016
All of Mr. Chow's kibble has gone missing, so Fern investigates to find out what happened to it.
15	5	"Whisker Haven Buddies Day"	April 13, 2016
Petite pairs up with Nyle for Buddies Day.
16	6	"Where is Taj?"	April 20, 2016
The Palace Pets play a game of hide and seek with Taj.
17	7	"Helping Hooves"	July 15, 2016
Truffles and Bibbidy help Pumpkin find her missing bows.
18	8	"Whoop-de-Doo!"	July 21, 2016
The Palace Pets rehearse for their show.
19	9	"Brie-zy Does It!"	July 27, 2016
Brie believes she can make many saddles all on her own for the Royal Pony-Palooza, although it's not as easy as she thinks.
20	10	"Treasure's Island"	August 23, 2016
The Palace Pets have a pool party, but it seems Petite feels uncomfortable about going in the water.
21	11	"Slipper-Sparkle"	September 1, 2016
Slipper puts sparkles all over the sails and the deck of Treasure's ship, but the sparkles ruin the ship instead of making it better.
22	12	"Halloween in Whisker Haven"	October 1, 2016
Berry has been so busy that she's forgotten to make a Halloween costume of her own. Fortunately, her friends Daisy, Matey, and Slipper try to help her make a costume.
23	13	"Winter in Whisker Haven"	December 1, 2016
With all of the new Palace Pets arriving, Miss Featherbon has become overwhelmed. Now it's up to a few of those Pets to deliver the presents in time for Christmas.

=== Season 3 (2017) ===
By this period, episode lengths have been reduced from 3 1/2 minutes to 2 minutes.

No. overall	No. in season	Title	Original release date
24	1	"Tunnels of Fun"	June 3, 2017
When Berry tries to deliver her basket of goodies all over Whisker Haven, she keeps falling into holes.
25	2	"The Fancy Fur Ball"	June 3, 2017
When Treasure does Pumpkin's hair for the Fur Ball, the disastrous do makes Pumpkin wig out.
26	3	"Pawcation Investigation"	July 31, 2017
When Treasure and River gather supplies for the pets' Pawcation, they discover the yacht is missing and that they must find it.
27	4	"S-Paw Day"	July 31, 2017
Sultan doesn't want anything to do with Pumpkin's S-Paw Day - that is, until he discovers how comfy lounge chairs are.
28	5	"Ashes to Ashes"	August 7, 2017
Slipper's dragon friend Ash comes to visit, but her newfound fire-breathing power sparks trouble on the yacht.
29	6	"Sheep Trick"	August 7, 2017
Petite has trouble memorizing the ship's terms for her Captain's exam.
30	7	"Sleep Talkers"	August 14, 2017
While in their new camper, Sultan and Treasure keep waking up Dreamy with their noisy car games.
31	8	"It's Camper Time"	August 14, 2017
Chipper and Pumpkin try to find common ground when Chipper wants to go camping and Pumpkin wants to go glamping.

== Broadcast ==
Whisker Haven Tales with the Palace Pets episodes premiered on the Disney Junior watch app. It later aired on Disney Junior on June 20, 2015. The second season was released on March 14, 2016. The third season debuted on June 3, 2017. The series was later made available to stream on DisneyNow.

== Reception ==
=== Viewership ===
On March 16, 2016, it was announced that the first season of Whisker Haven Tales with the Palace Pets generated over 204 million views across all platforms in 2015.

=== Critical response ===
Ashley Jones of Romper ranked Whisker Haven Tales with the Palace Pets 13th in their "13 Shows For Kids Who Love Princesses" list, writing, "The Palace Pets travel to a magical world and embark on fun, fantasy-filled adventures."

=== Accolades ===
List of awards and nominations for Whisker Haven Tales with the Palace Pets
Year	Award	Category	Nominee(s)	Result	Ref.
2016	Young Artist Awards	Best Performance in a Voice–Over Role – Young Actress (11 and under)	Darielle Stewart	Nominated	
2016	Young Entertainer Awards	Best Young Actress – Voice Over Role	Hannah Swain	Won	
2016	Young Entertainer Awards	Best Young Actress Voice Over Role 12 and under	Mila Brener	Nominated	
2017	Kidscreen Awards	Best Web/App Series	Whisker Haven Tales with the Palace Pets	Nominated	

== In other media ==
=== Books ===
- Palace Pets Big Golden Book: Welcome to Whisker Haven
- Ms. Featherbon and the Holiday Helpers
- Berry's Halloween Costume Trouble
- Whisker Haven: A Paw-fect Party!
- Treasure's Adventures
- Petite's Great Feats
- Sultan's Triumphs

=== Video games ===
- Palace Pets in Whisker Haven
