= Fright Krewe =

American animated streaming television series

- Genre: Adventure; Horror; Comedy
- Created by: Eli Roth; James Frey
- Showrunners: Joanna Lewis; Kristine Songco
- Voices of: Sydney Mikayla; Tim Johnson Jr.; Grace Lu; Chester Rushing; Terrence Little Gardenhigh; Jacques Colimon
- Composer: Zach Robinson
- Country of origin: United States
- Original language: English
- No. of seasons: 2
- No. of episodes: 20

Production
- Executive producers: Eli Roth; James Frey; Joanna Lewis; Kristine Songco
- Production company: DreamWorks Animation Television

Original release
- Network: Peacock; Hulu
- Release: October 2, 2023 – March 29, 2024

Fright Krewe is an American animated adventure horror comedy series produced by DreamWorks Animation Television and created by Eli Roth and James Frey. Sydney Mikayla, Tim Johnson Jr., Grace Lu, Chester Rushing, Terrence Little Gardenhigh, and Jacques Colimon star as the series' main voice cast.

The series premiered on October 2, 2023, on Peacock and Hulu. A second season was released on March 29, 2024.

== Summary ==
In modern-day New Orleans, a mismatched group of teens find themselves charged with defending the city from a vast variety of dark creatures. Blessed with powers from voodoo spirits, the teens will have to work together to stop an evil they themselves have unleashed.

== Cast ==
=== Main ===
- Sydney Mikayla as Soleil
- Tim Johnson Jr. as Maybe
- Grace Lu as Missy
- Chester Rushing as Stanley
- Terrence Little Gardenhigh as Pat
- Jacques Colimon as Belial

=== Recurring ===
- Vanessa Hudgens as Madison
- Josh Richards as Nelson
- X Mayo as Alma
- Rob Paulsen as Lou Garou
- David Kaye as Mayor Furst
- JoNell Kennedy as Marie Laveau & Judy Le Claire
- Melanie Laurent as Fiona Bunrady
- Chris Jai Alex as Otis Bunrady
- Reggie Watkins as Paulie
- Cherise Woods as Ayida Wedo & Ayizan
- Keston John as Papa Legba & Ogoun
- Grey DeLisle as Judith Le Claire
- Krizia Bajos as Luciana Rodriguez
- Mia Perez as Cece Rodriguez Jones
- Mckenna Grace as Regina
- Nolan North as Professor Smith
- Thomas Lennon as Mr. Edison
- Kath Soucie as Mother Ella

== Episodes ==
=== Series overview ===
Season	Episodes	Originally released
1	10	October 2, 2023
2	10	March 29, 2024

=== Season 1 (2023) ===
No. overall	No. in season	Title	Directed by	Written by	Storyboarded by	Original release date
1	1	"The Blood Awakening: Part 1"	Leah Artwick	Joanna Lewis and Kristine Songco	Josh Covey and Abby Davies	October 2, 2023
2	2	"The Blood Awakening: Part 2"	Leah Artwick	Joanna Lewis and Kristine Songco	Josh Covey, Kai Lynn Jiang and Jae Hong Kim	October 2, 2023
3	3	"The Craving"	Kevin Wotton and Stephen Copper	Eve Crusto, Scott Damian and Crescent Imani Novell	Andries Martiz, Darwin Tan, Simon Williams and Hayden Morris	October 2, 2023
4	4	"The Haunting"	Marc Wasik	Crescent Imani Novell	Manuk Chang, Mark Sonntag, Mauricio Pizarro and Simon Williams	October 2, 2023
5	5	"The Feast"	Kevin Wotton	Scott Damian	Andries Martiz, Darwin Tan, Hayden Morris and Tony Lovett	October 2, 2023
6	6	"The Swamp"	Mark Wasik and Kelly Baigent	Eve Crusto	Mark Sonntag, Manuk Chang, Mauricio Pizarro, Pete Jacobs and Tony Lovett	October 2, 2023
7	7	"The Light"	Joseph Bernados	Emily Beaver	Josh Covey, Abby Davies and Kai Lynn Jiang	October 2, 2023
8	8	"Part 1: The Bait"	Kevin Wotton	Crescent Imani Novell	Darwin Tan, Hayden Morris, Tony Lovett, and Mauricio Pizarro	October 2, 2023
9	9	"Part 2: The Trap"	Mark Wasik and Kelly Baigent	Scott Damian	Manuk Chang, Mauricio Pizarro, Pete Jacobs and Tony Lovett	October 2, 2023
10	10	"The War"	Joseph Bernados	Eve Crusto	Josh Covey, Abby Davies, Kai Lynn Jiang and Holly Ready	October 2, 2023

=== Season 2 (2024) ===
No. overall	No. in season	Title	Directed by	Written by	Storyboarded by	Original release date
11	1	"The Nightmare"	Kevin Wotton	Scott Damian	Hayden Morris, Darwin Tan, Tony Lovett, Mark Sonntag and Manuk Chang	March 29, 2024
12	2	"The Loss"	Kelly Baigent	Joanna Lewis and Kristine Songco	Aaron Davies, Tony Lovett, Manuk Chang, Mark Sonntag and Mauricio Pizarro	March 29, 2024
13	3	"The Bridge"	Joseph Bernados and Scooter Tidwell	Crescent Imani Novell	Thad Carlile and Holly Ready	March 29, 2024
14	4	"The Collection"	Kevin Wotton	Eve Crusto	Darwin Tan, Hayden Morris, Mark Sonntag and Bingxin (Vicky) Hu	March 29, 2024
15	5	"The Escape"	Kelly Baigent and Mark Wasik	Emily Beaver	Manuk Chang, Mauricio Pizarro, Tony Lovett, Tang Lee, and Hayden Morris	March 29, 2024
16	6	"The Return"	Joseph Bernados and Scooter Tidwell	Scott Damian	Thad Carlile, Kai Lynn Jiang and Chelsey Lynn	March 29, 2024
17	7	"The Decay"	Kevin Wotton	Crescent Imani Novell	Darwin Tan, Hayden Morris, Mark Sonntag, Marc Wasik, Tang Lee and Bingxin (Vicky) Hu	March 29, 2024
18	8	"The Descent"	Kelly Baigent and Mark Wasik	Eve Crusto	Mark Sonntag, Manuk Chang, Mauricio Pizarro and Tony Lovett	March 29, 2024
19	9	"The Sacrifice: Part 1"	Kevin Wotton	Emily Beaver	Darwin Tan, Hayden Morris, Tang Lee and Bingxin (Vicky) Hu	March 29, 2024
20	10	"The Sacrifice: Part 2"	Joseph Bernados and Scooter Tidwell	Joanna Lewis and Kristine Songco	Thad Carlile, Kai Lynn Jiang and Chelsey Lynn	March 29, 2024

== Production ==
=== Development ===
The concept for the series was conceived during 2015, when Eli Roth had a discussion with James Frey regarding shows of their childhood such as Scooby-Doo, Where Are You! and Goosebumps, and how they felt modern children's media lacked projects with a similar tone. This led them to want to create their own children-oriented project with a horror tone. By 2019, the duo were developing a pitch for a children-oriented horror series for DreamWorks Animation Television when they, via DreamWorks executive Ben Cawood, approached Kipo and the Age of Wonderbeasts (2020) episode writers Joanna Lewis and Kristine Songco to work on their pitch, as the two were interested on developing DreamWorks series directed at older audiences.

On June 9, 2023, it was reported that Roth and Frey were working on a series titled Fright Krewe for DreamWorks Animation Television. Roth and Frey were set as executive producers alongside Lewis and Songco, with Sydney Mikayla, Tim Johnson Jr., Grace Lu, Chester Rushing, Terrence Little Gardenhigh, and Jacques Colimon announced to star. Lewis and Songco also serve as showrunners.

In November 2023, the series was renewed for a second season.

=== Writing ===
Early drafts for the series had a more episodic storytelling, but Lewis and Songco decided to use a serialized story after joining the project in order to make it more approachable to older audiences focusing more on the kids' relationships and experiences. They also felt this approach allowed the series to stand out from other horror-oriented children series.

Having no experience writing horror material before, Songco and Lewis studied horror films as research in how to write within the genre, in addition to drawing inspiration from films they watched during their childhoods, and authors such as Anne Rice and R. L. Stine. The duo also sought to avoid relying on slasher material due to the series' young-adult demographic, wanting the series to instead serve as "bridge between something that’s a little bit… older than Scooby-Doo but for people who are starting to get into horror but not quite ready for slasher, gory films". The writers first conceived the main cast as horror film stereotypes, before expanding their characterizations into more nuanced personalities that still explored horror tropes while using the series' world to give said tropes a unique interpretation.

Having traveled to New Orleans and learning of voodoo before working on the series, Lewis sought to represent voodoo accurately within the show, so she and Songco did research on voodoo and brought in experts to work on the series as consultants.

=== Animation ===
Animation services for the series were provided by Digitoonz.

=== Music ===
Zach Robinson composed the score for the series.

== Release ==
The series premiered on Hulu and Peacock on October 2, 2023. The second season premiered on March 29, 2024.
