= Jahkara Smith =

American YouTuber and actress (born 1996)

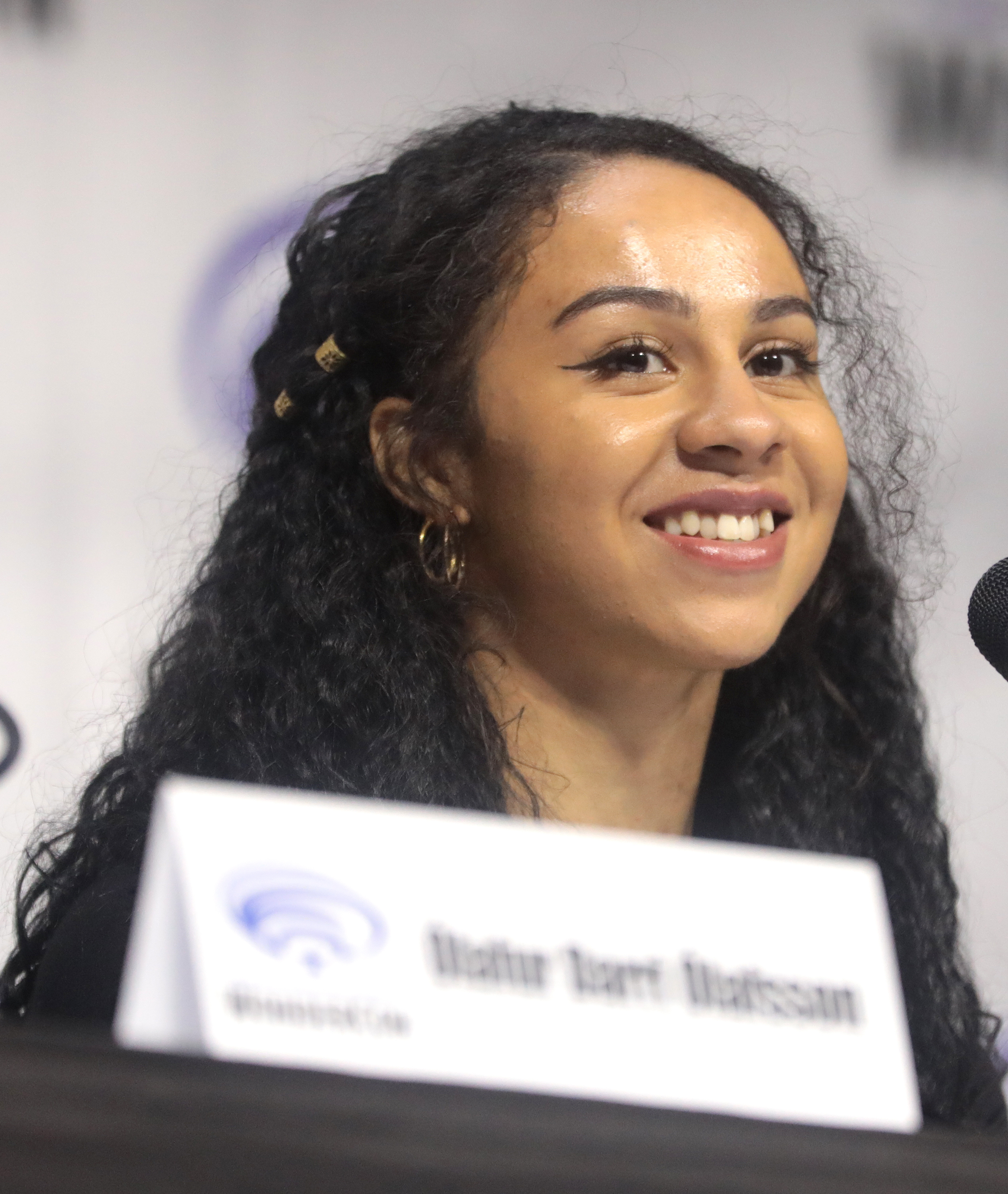
- Smith at the 2019 WonderCon
- Born: September 5, 1996 (age 29); St. Louis, Missouri, U.S.
- Occupations: YouTuber; actress
- Years active: 2017–present

YouTube information
- Channel: Jahkara S
- Subscribers: 478 thousand
- Views: 582 thousand
- Last updated: April 2024

Jahkara Smith (born September 5, 1996) is an American YouTuber and actress. She is best known for the YouTube channel Sailor J, where she published parody make-up tutorial videos. She came to further recognition for her starring role as Margaret "Maggie" Leigh in the AMC supernatural horror drama series NOS4A2 (2019–2020). She also appeared in the Hulu horror anthology series Into the Dark (2019).

== Early life ==
Smith was born in St. Louis, Missouri, on September 5, 1996.

== Career ==
=== YouTube ===
Smith began posting YouTube videos in 2017 on her channel Sailor J while working at a United States Air Force base. Her first videos were parodies of make-up tutorial videos which include social commentary, having been inspired by sexist comments she read on those videos. They quickly went viral thanks, in part, to celebrities such as Sia sharing them. Within the first month of her YouTube channel, Smith was receiving around 10,000 new subscribers per day on YouTube and had totalled 6 million views on Facebook. By March 2018, her YouTube videos had received over 10 million views.

Her tutorial videos have included commentary on subjects ranging from Native American-inspired make-up to the phrase "thoughts and prayers". In addition to make-up tutorial videos, Smith has also published videos on subjects including Harry Potter Hogwarts Houses and Zodiac signs. Audio and video clips from the Sailor J channel later went viral on TikTok, which Smith did not support.

In July 2020, Smith confirmed the deletion of her YouTube channel. However, as of October 2025, she has begun posting new content.

=== Acting ===
In 2018, Smith signed on to star as Margaret "Maggie" Leigh in the AMC supernatural horror drama series NOS4A2. The series premiered in 2019.

Also in 2019, Smith portrayed Shay in the Hulu horror anthology series Into the Dark, starring in the episode titled "Pure".

== Personal life ==
Smith joined the United States Air Force at the age of 18. Shortly before she planned to leave home, the shooting of Michael Brown took place. Smith cites the resulting protests and curfews as eye-opening for her.

She is bisexual.

== Filmography ==
Year	Title	Role	Notes
2019–2020	NOS4A2	Margaret "Maggie" Leigh	Main role; 20 episodes
2019	Into the Dark	Shay	Episode: "Pure"
