= NOS4A2 (TV series) =

American supernatural horror drama television series

- Genre: Supernatural horror drama
- Created by: Jami O'Brien
- Based on: NOS4A2 by Joe Hill
- Starring: Ashleigh Cummings; Ólafur Darri Ólafsson; Jahkara J. Smith; Ebon Moss-Bachrach; Virginia Kull; Zachary Quinto; Jonathan Langdon; Ashley Romans; Mattea Conforti
- Opening theme: "Carol of the Bells"
- Composer: Mike Patton
- Country of origin: United States
- Original language: English
- No. of seasons: 2
- No. of episodes: 20

Production
- Executive producers: Jami O'Brien; Joe Hill; Kari Skogland; Lauren Corrao
- Producer: Shana Fischer Huber
- Production locations: Providence, Rhode Island; West Warwick, Rhode Island; Warren, Rhode Island
- Cinematography: Martin Ahlgren
- Editor: Todd Desrosiers
- Running time: 40–56 minutes
- Production companies: O'Brien Construction; The Tornante Company; AMC Studios

Original release
- Network: AMC
- Release: June 2, 2019 – August 23, 2020

NOS4A2 (pronounced Nosferatu) is an American supernatural horror drama television series, based on the 2013 novel by Joe Hill, that ran on AMC from June 2, 2019, to August 23, 2020. It was created by Jami O'Brien and stars Ashleigh Cummings, Ólafur Darri Ólafsson, Jahkara J. Smith, Ebon Moss-Bachrach, Virginia Kull, and Zachary Quinto. The series follows a working-class artist who uses supernatural abilities to track an immortal being who preys on children. In August 2020, the series was canceled after two seasons, after completing the storyline presented in the original novel.

== Premise ==
NOS4A2 follows Victoria "Vic" McQueen, a young working-class artist who discovers that she has a supernatural ability to track the seemingly immortal Charlie Manx. Manx feeds on the souls of children, then deposits what remains of them into Christmasland—a twisted Christmas Village of Manx's imagination where every day is Christmas Day and unhappiness is against the law. Vic must strive to defeat Manx and rescue his victims—without losing her mind or falling victim to him herself.

== Cast and characters ==
=== Main ===
- Ashleigh Cummings as Victoria "Vic" McQueen
- Ólafur Darri Ólafsson as Bing Partridge
- Jahkara J. Smith as Margaret "Maggie" Leigh
- Ebon Moss-Bachrach as Christopher "Chris" McQueen
- Virginia Kull as Linda McQueen
- Zachary Quinto as Charlie Manx
- Jonathan Langdon as Lou Carmody (season 2; guest season 1)
- Ashley Romans as Tabitha Hutter (season 2; recurring season 1)
- Mattea Conforti as Millie Manx (season 2; guest season 1)

=== Recurring ===
- Dalton Harrod as Craig
- Chris McKinney as Sheriff Bly (season 1)
- Rarmian Newton as Drew Butler (season 1)
- Paulina Singer as Willa Brewster (season 1)
- Karen Pittman as Angela Brewster (season 1)
- Darby Camp as Haley Smith (season 1)
- Asher Miles Fallica as Daniel Moore (season 1)
- Judith Roberts as Jolene (season 1)
- Rebecca Gibel as Tina Harrison (season 1)
- Jason David as Bruce Wayne McQueen (season 2)
- Paul Schneider as Jonathan Beckett, the "Hourglass Man" (season 2)

== Episodes ==
Season	Episodes	Originally released	
Season	Episodes	First released	Last released
1	10	June 2, 2019	July 28, 2019
2	10	June 21, 2020	August 23, 2020

=== Season 1 (2019) ===
The complete season became available on June 2, 2019, via AMC's on-demand service, AMC Premiere.

No. overall	No. in season	Title	Directed by	Written by	Original release date	U.S. viewers (millions)
1	1	"The Shorter Way"	Kari Skogland	Jami O'Brien	June 2, 2019	1.108
The immortal 135-year-old Charlie Manx lures a child from his home in Here, Iowa into his 1938 Rolls-Royce Wraith bound for Christmasland, a magical place "where every day is Christmas and unhappiness is against the law". Meanwhile, Victoria "Vic" McQueen, a Haverhill, Massachusetts townie discovers her supernatural abilities when she is able to portal through an old covered bridge that was demolished long ago.
2	2	"The Graveyard of What Might Be"	Kari Skogland	Mark Richard	June 9, 2019	0.891
After crossing the Shorter Way bridge into Here, Iowa, Vic meets Maggie, a medium who uses Scrabble tiles to seek answers to the strange happenings. She explains that like her, Vic is a Strong Creative, a chosen one to find lost children who were kidnapped by Charlie Manx. Meanwhile, Manx visits Haverhill to find Vic but instead recruits school custodian Bing Partridge, who is eager to work in Christmasland and help Manx "rescue and recover" kids from their bad parents.
3	3	"The Gas Mask Man"	John Shiban	Marcus Gardley	June 16, 2019	0.921
Vic visits her dream art school RISD with her wealthy friends. Her dream seems out of reach without financial aid, so on Willa's advice, Vic forges her father's signature on a tax return. Back in Haverhill, Manx senses the presence of a Strong Creative, an old woman in the town's psychiatric ward, who used her roller skates as her "knife" to portal. With Bing Partridge's help, Manx tries to track down Vic by the Shorter Way bridge, but meets Vic's young neighbor, Haley, who is looking for her lost cat, Mittens. Later, Bing, while wearing a gas mask, gasses Haley's mother with sevoflurane and kidnaps Haley.
4	4	"The House of Sleep"	John Shiban	Megan Mostyn-Brown	June 23, 2019	0.729
Bing's childhood in Sugarcreek, Pennsylvania with his abusive father and his submissive mother comes into perspective about his adult life as a serial killer. As a teenager, when his father insults him for hanging the Christmas lights too slowly, Bing kills him with a nail gun. When his mother finds out, he mistakes her motherly behavior for romantic affection and ends up raping and killing her, as well. Bing, easily influenced by Manx, re-creates his crime by doing the same with Haley's mother, Sharon. The Shorter Way leads Vic to Bing's house where she discovers the evidence of her kidnapping in the basement. Later, Vic finds her corpse buried in dirt with a nail through her skull. Manx asks that he and Vic meet in person.
5	5	"The Wraith"	Tim Southam	Lucy Thurber	June 30, 2019	0.737
Manx lays out his plan for Vic; come to Christmasland and serve as a mother to all the kidnapped children. However, Vic vows to find it and burn the whole place down. Maggie finds the Wraith and the vanity license plate, but when Maggie touches the car, Manx senses it. The Wraith's ignition starts up and slams into Maggie. Vic is questioned by Tabitha Hutter, the detective on the case and she tells her the truth about Manx and his Wraith. Hutter suggests that Vic should be committed to a psych ward. After a little prodding from her dad, Vic signs a voluntary commitment form.
6	6	"The Dark Tunnels"	Tim Southam	Thomas Brady	July 7, 2019	0.666
In 1954, Saugus, Massachusetts, young Charlie Manx proposes to Strong Creative Jolene, a carhop at a drive-in. He wants to take her to Christmasland to be a family with all the children he's saved, but she refuses. In the mental ward, Vic is placed in the same room as an aged Jolene, who tells her about Manx. They're transported in Jolene's new knife, a wheelchair, to the Dark Tunnels, Jolene's Inscape where missing child posters dot the walls. Before she dies, Jolene uses her ability to destroy the Wraith's engine, which turns Manx into an old man. In order to leave the hospital, Vic tells the doctor that she made everything up. She asks Maggie, who was discharged earlier, to team up again, but Maggie is done due to her incident with the Wraith. She tosses her Scrabble bag into the trash and returns to Iowa.
7	7	"Scissors for the Drifter"	Jeremy Webb	Jami O'Brien	July 14, 2019	0.660
A vulnerable Manx finds himself dying and without the Wraith running. After Vic's mother sells her bike, Vic is without her knife and needs to access the Shorter Way to find Manx. She reaches Maggie but she's is no help and is abusing her pain pills. Vic heads to Bike Week with her father to look for another dirt bike, but cannot find one to connect with. Over the course of the episode, Vic continuously gets calls only she can hear from the kidnapped children from Christmasland, including one who calls herself "Millie Manx". Manx and Bing arrive at a scrap yard in Nebraska that has Wraith parts. The proprietress calls Sheriff Joe to report them but, before the local police can respond Manx kills her, and taunts her for being a bad mother and taking her son and grandson many years ago. A sober Maggie wakes up in Joe's home to find his squad car's lights flashing outside. Manx kidnapped Joe and took him to Christmasland to play a deadly game of Scissors for the Drifter.
8	8	"Parnassus"	Jeremy Webb	Megan Mostyn-Brown	July 21, 2019	0.775
In the aftermath of Joe's disappearance, Maggie initially turns to her mother for consolation, but can't bring herself to return due to the strict rules. Maggie's Scrabble bag strangely returns and confirm Joe's death at the hands of the Christmasland children. In response, Maggie proceeds to binge on drugs and alcohol. Meanwhile, Vic receives word that she's been accepted into RISD and is invited to a party hosted by Willa. Vic's mother and father briefly reunite at the party, with Linda showing concern about Vic being ready for a college education. After the party, Vic and her mother have an argument that ends in Vic storming out of the house before being captured by Bing. Luckily, she manages to escape from Bing's clutches and, after a phone call from Maggie, recovers her bike and saves Maggie from an overdose. In a bar, Charlie Manx meets with another Strong Creative named Abe and proposes the idea of having Vic be a mother to his children. Abe, however, strongly disagrees, proposing that Manx kill Vic due to the extent of her abilities.
9	9	"Sleigh House"	Hanelle Culpepper	Thomas Brady	July 28, 2019	0.676
Craig attacks Bing in his house to avenge Vic's abduction. Vic and Maggie arrive to find the house empty. Bing brings Craig to Manx, who questions him about Vic's purity. Vic travels The Shorter Way to Manx's house, where she finds the Wraith with Craig locked in the back, and one of Manx' children hunting her. Manx tosses Vic's bike into the bridge, destroying it, and then burns the house down with Vic trapped inside, but she narrowly escapes. Maggie convinces Detective Hutter that her powers are real and directs the police to find Bing in his old workplace, but they are too late.
10	10	"Gunbarrel"	Stefan Schwartz	Jami O'Brien	July 28, 2019	0.676
Craig escapes his constraints in the trunk of the Wraith and sabotages it by punching a hole in the fuel tank with a crowbar. Vic flags down a biker named Lou Carmody and seeks help in a gas station in what she learns is Colorado. The Wraith pulls up outside the gas station in the same moment. Craig escapes from the trunk into the car, where the child attacks him. Lou holds up Manx at gunpoint, but Manx takes the gun from Lou. Vic sets fire to the Wraith, causing Manx to age horribly. The Wraith explodes, killing Craig. In the hospital, Vic learns that she is pregnant, and that Manx is in a coma. Hutter visits Maggie, and they ask the tiles where Bing is. At Craig's funeral, Vic tells her father that she's pregnant and leaves the town for good. Vic vows to Maggie to find Christmasland and rescue the children. Six months later, Bing is seen working at a dentist's with access to more of the gas. Vic is with Lou and hears Haley inviting her to Christmasland. An automechanic starts the Wraith, causing Manx to wake up from his coma.

=== Season 2 (2020) ===
No. overall	No. in season	Title	Directed by	Written by	Original release date	U.S. viewers (millions)
11	1	"Bad Mother"	John Shiban	Jami O'Brien	June 21, 2020	0.417
Eight years on, Vic is now living in Colorado with Lou and her son, Wayne. On a news report, she eventually learns that Charlie Manx has finally died after spending eight years in a coma. The news unsettles Vic, who begs Maggie to consult her Tiles for the truth. Maggie, who's now living in Haverhill with FBI Agent Hutter, initially denies Vic the request, but confirms the death of the Wraith through her Tiles and suffers a seizure as a result. Vic is eventually told about a Triumph motorbike, immediately feeling a connection to it, believing it to be her new Knife. However, she's tormented by calls from Millie Manx in Christmasland, where the lights are slowly beginning to flicker and die out. In a drunken episode, Vic use the Shorter Way to visit the morgue where Manx's body is being kept and stabs at his heart with a scalpel. However, Bing Patridge has finally located the Wraith and, after incapacitating the new owner, places the engine back in the Wraith's body, restarting Charlie Manx's heart.
12	2	"Good Father"	John Shiban	David Grimm	June 28, 2020	0.432
Charlie Manx awakens in the morgue, killing a security guard and escaping using his car. Years before present events, Charlie Manx’s story unfolds - once a poor chauffeur, Charlie falls in love with Cassie Hill and elopes with her to start a new life together. They soon have a daughter, Millie, but their happiness begins to fade as Charlie’s desire for wealth and status grows. After being humiliated by Cassie’s wealthy father after requesting money to begin a private chauffeur business, Charlie becomes obsessed with proving himself, buying an expensive Rolls-Royce Wraith with money meant for their daughter's future. As his mental state worsens, he takes Cassie and Millie on a dangerous winter drive that ends in tragedy when Millie mysteriously transforms into something monstrous in the back seat and kills Cassie. The fateful drive ends in Charlie's twisted mindscape of Christmasland. In the present, Bing Partridge finishes repairing the Wraith, using the child of the previous owner to help rejuvenate Charlie to his youthful appearance. Now back to his full strength, Manx vows to maintain Christmasland for Millie and reclaim what he believes was stolen from him, setting his sights once again on Vic McQueen and her son, Wayne.
13	3	"The Night Road"	Craig Macneill	Lucy Thurber	July 5, 2020	0.385
In Christmasland, Millie Manx investigates a mysterious light beyond the Christmasland gates and discovers a distorted version of the home she once knew, only to be confronted by the undead form of her mother. Meanwhile, Vic McQueen seeks refuge with her estranged father and mother after using the Shorter Way to travel back to Haverhill, both now changed in the years since she left, as she battles her guilt and conflict over protecting her son Wayne. Back in Colorado, Lou uncovers that a mysterious customer is in fact Bing Partridge and successfully fights him off while Wayne avoids being taken by Charlie Manx after Manx fails to tell Wayne the family's password. Learning about this encounter, Vic decides to confront Manx on the “Night Road,” where he taunts her about her perceived failures and the boy she’s trying to protect, and Vic’s attack with a flaming canister fails as Manx escapes. Following her failed assault, Vic’s mother delivers a blunt message after Vic returns to Haverhill: “A mother stays.” Vic then commits to living for her son, joining Maggie and Tabitha in their home where Lou and Wayne are sheltered. Meanwhile, Manx makes moves of his own, requesting a meeting with the shadowy figure known as “The Hourglass”.
14	4	"The Lake House"	Craig Macneill	Megan Mostyn-Brown	July 12, 2020	0.341
Vic and Lou take Wayne to hide out at Vic’s father Chris’s remote lake house, trying to keep him safe after Wayne sleep‑walks and dreams of Christmasland. Meanwhile, Hutter receives a lead on Bing Partridge, tracks him to his hideout in an abandoned church, and unexpectedly confronts Manx. Hutter ends up shooting him in the head. Back at the lake house, Lou tells Vic he intends to officially adopt Wayne and urges her to confront her drinking and erratic behavior. Chris and Vic wire explosives around the house as a defensive measure and shares painful truths about their experiences in both sobriety and parenting. Using her Tiles, Maggie discovers the location of the new House of Sleep and travels with Vic to reinforce Tabitha, only to find Manx has already fled with Bing and the Wraith. Meanwhile, Wayne’s sleep‑walking intensifies as Manx’s influence grows, and he reveals to Lou that he accidentally revealed the family's new location to Charlie Manx in a dream.
15	5	"Bruce Wayne McQueen"	Hanelle Culpepper	Thomas Brady	July 19, 2020	0.410
After his earlier admission that he revealed the lake house’s location, Wayne becomes the target of a coordinated assault: two FBI agents under the control of the mysterious Hourglass Man arrive first, open fire on Chris McQueen and trigger confusion at the lake house before one agent is killed by Chris and the other shoots themselves in the head. Bing Partridge uses sevoflurane to incapacitate Lou as Manx seizes Wayne and places him in the Wraith. Vic rushes back to the Lake House via the Shorter Way, finds Lou unconscious and her father's explosives useless. She is confronted face‑to‑face by Charlie Manx who taunts her and runs her down with the Wraith; despite a ferocious struggle, she watches helplessly as the car speeds away with her son inside. Wayne, trapped and terrified in the back of the Wraith, faces Manx’s promises of a “better” home in Christmasland while hearing Vic's desperate promise to rescue him outside. Vic later wakes in the hospital with both Lous and Chris there - all three are battered from their encounter, but still determined to rescue Wayne.
16	6	"The Hourglass"	Hanelle Culpepper	Loy A. Webb	July 26, 2020	0.404
After Vic McQueen recovers from her hospital injuries, she insists on rescuing her son Wayne and prepares to use her Triumph bike to follow the trail to him. Meanwhile, Maggie Leigh investigates the mysterious Hourglass Man, Jonathan Beckett, and learns how to use her Tiles without suffering their usual debilitating side effects by harnessing pain rather than allowing it to trigger seizures. She confronts Beckett, discovers the limits of his power, and eventually destroys his hourglass following a struggle, leaving him powerless. Tabitha Hutter is temporarily removed from the case by the FBI but continues coordinating with Maggie to locate Wayne. Wayne remains trapped in Charlie Manx’s Wraith, struggling to resist Manx’s control while a ghostly vision of his father warns him about the danger he faces, reinforcing his desire to hold onto hope from his mother’s promise to save him. Wayne successfully manages to call Vic and tell her about where he's located, but he is slowly consumed by the Wraith's influence after he rips a butterfly to pieces with his bare hands.
17	7	"Cripple Creek"	Tricia Brock	A. Rey Pamatmat	August 2, 2020	0.360
Bing Partridge suddenly arrives at the junkyard and gasses Charlie Manx, chaining him up and disconnecting the engine of the Wraith from the rest of the car. As Bing demands answers from Manx, flashbacks to Manx’s childhood are revealed - a poor boy raised by his prostitute mother, young Charlie was drawn into the orbit of a predatory shopkeeper, Mr. Tim, whose “generosity” turns to abuse. When Manx retaliates violently, killing his abuser with a sled runner and later murdering his mother for her complacency in the abuse of other children under Mr. Tim. Meanwhile, in Christmasland, Millie senses her father’s weakening hold on their world. She encounters a version of herself who yearns to grow up and live a normal life, forcing Millie to confront the truth: if her father dies, Christmasland, and anyone still inside of it, will vanish. Now knowing the truth of Manx's goals, Bing makes one final attempt at redemption - he locks Manx in the Wraith, drags the car into a crusher, and prepares to sacrifice himself to destroy both Manx and the vehicle. Just before the Wraith is destroyed, Wayne intervenes and stops the crusher, having been fully infected by the Wraith's influence. Manx seizes the moment, stabs Bing, and reclaims both the Wraith and Wayne, leaving Bing in the dirt.
18	8	"Chris McQueen"	Tricia Brock	Megan Mostyn-Brown	August 9, 2020	0.333
The episode opens with Chris delivering a heartfelt eulogy at his father’s funeral, reflecting on the damage and dysfunction passed down through generations. Back in the present, Vic rebuilds her Triumph motorcycle with Lou and her father and, with Chris by her side, opens the Shorter Way Bridge to chase down the Wraith. Chris’s rage gets the better of him when he attacks Bing, forcing Vic to intervene. Bing recovers in FBI custody, where Agent Hutter lets Vic question him. Bing tells her about the Sleigh House, the final stop before Christmasland, where Manx makes each child hang an ornament representing their stolen soul. Vic, Chris, Lou, Hutter, and Maggie head to Colorado to set a trap in one last attempt to save Wayne. Chris admits his failures and pleads for forgiveness, while Vic struggles to let go of her anger. Their reconciliation is cut short when Manx and the Wraith arrive. Wayne, now nearly lost to Manx’s influence, bites Lou and hangs his ornament on the tree. Simultaneously, the Wraith evades the bombs Chris and Vic have planted; in a desperate attempt to save Vic, Chris pushes her out of the way of the Wraith's path and is run over by Manx. Vic can only watch helplessly as Manx taunts Chris about his failures before snapping his neck, killing Chris instantly.
19	9	"Welcome to Christmasland"	Toa Fraser	Thomas Brady	August 16, 2020	0.347
Now more determined than ever to save Wayne following the death of her father, Vic rides her Triumph motorcycle straight into the heart of Christmasland with Maggie and a number of explosives. Inside the park, Manx delights in welcoming Wayne as his newest “child,” giving him a shiny astronaut suit and a spot in his guestbook — where Wayne signs his name as Wayne Manx. Millie, having realized the truth of her past, is disillusioned with her father's illusions and forces Manx to confront painful memories of his own past, including his childhood and his wife Cassie. After Charlie refuses to admit the truth to himself, Millie finally sees her father for who he is and ultimately chooses to leave Christmasland behind. Vic and Maggie successfully infiltrate Christmasland and face off against the monstrous children who inhabit it, all while planting explosives throughout the land. Vic eventually finds Wayne, but their reunion quickly turns violent when he stabs her with a pair of scissors. Despite the injury, Vic reminds him of their bond, calling him “Bats” and pleading with him to remember who he really is. Her words finally break through Manx's hold on her son, and as Wayne’s memories return along with his humanity, the lights of Christmasland finally begin to die as the explosives are set off, crippling Manx.
20	10	"Bats"	Toa Fraser	Jami O'Brien	August 23, 2020	0.353
After taking Wayne to the Sleigh House, Vic returns to Christmasland for Maggie; Lou and Tabitha realize that smashing the ornaments returns the kids to normal. Badly weakened, Manx chases Vic and Maggie onto the Shorter Way bridge, but Vic drops the Wraith off the bridge and into the static below, finally killing Manx. In the aftermath, Wayne and the other kids struggle to adapt to normal lives while Millie, who refuses to break her ornament, intends to rebuild Christmasland and get the kids back. Vic, Lou and Wayne move back to Haverhill while Maggie starts searching for others like herself against Vic's wishes. Manx's body and the wrecked Wraith wash up in Haverhill a month after his defeat and Manx is cremated and the Wraith crushed to ensure his final end.

== Production ==
=== Development ===
On December 8, 2015, it was announced that AMC had put a television series adaptation of Joe Hill's novel NOS4A2 into development. It was reported that a search was underway for a writer to pen the adaptation. Production companies involved in the series were set to include The Tornante Company and AMC Studios. On May 31, 2017, it was announced that AMC had opened a writers room for the series. Jami O'Brien led the writers room and executive produced alongside Hill.

On April 10, 2018, it was announced that AMC had given the production a series order for a first season consisting of ten episodes. Additionally, it was reported that O'Brien would serve as showrunner and that Lauren Corrao would be an executive producer.

Though the series is set in Haverhill, Massachusetts, it was filmed in various locations in Rhode Island, including the Cranston Street Armory.

On March 30, 2019, it was announced that the series would premiere on June 2, 2019.

On July 20, 2019, while at San Diego Comic-Con it was announced that AMC had renewed the series for a second season. The second season finished filming in January 2020 and premiered on June 21, 2020. Ratings saw a massive drop during season two, running at about half what they were during season one. On August 31, 2020, AMC canceled the series after two seasons and adapting the entire storyline of the original novel.

=== Casting ===
On June 27, 2018, it was announced that Ólafur Darri Ólafsson, Virginia Kull, and Ebon Moss-Bachrach had been cast in main roles. On July 5, 2018, it was reported that Jahkara Smith had joined the cast in a recurring capacity. On August 28, 2018, it was announced that Karen Pittman had been cast in a recurring role. On September 13, 2018, it was reported that Zachary Quinto and Ashleigh Cummings had been cast in the series' two lead roles of Charlie Manx and Vic McQueen, respectively. On October 12, 2018, it was announced that Rarmian Newton and Darby Camp had joined the cast in a recurring capacity. On December 17, 2018, it was reported that Ashley Romans would appear in a recurring role.

== Release ==
=== Marketing ===
On December 20, 2018, a promotional image from the series was released featuring Zachary Quinto in character as Charlie Manx.

=== Premiere ===
The series held its world premiere during the 2019 South by Southwest film festival in Austin, Texas, in March 2019, as a part of the festival's "Episodic Premieres" series of screenings. The first episode premiered on AMC on June 2, 2019. While AMC broadcast the episodes over a nine-week period, it made the entire series available for online streaming immediately on its AMC Premiere platform.

== Reception ==
=== Critical response ===
For the first season, review aggregator website Rotten Tomatoes reported a 69% approval rating with an average score of 6.6/10, based on 29 reviews. The website's critical consensus reads, "Though Nos4a2 strains to build the necessary atmosphere to pull off its ambitious premise, it does capture the spirit of Joe Hill's singular work and provides a new psychopath for Zachary Quinto to sink his teeth into." Metacritic, which uses a weighted average, assigned a score of 47 out of 100 based on nine critics, indicating "mixed or average reviews".

For the second season, review aggregator website Rotten Tomatoes reported a 75% approval rating with an average score of 5.37/10, based on 8 reviews.

=== Ratings ===
==== Season 1 ====
Viewership and ratings per episode of NOS4A2
No.	Title	Air date	Rating (18–49)	Viewers (millions)	DVR (18–49)	DVR viewers (millions)	Total (18–49)	Total viewers (millions)
1	"The Shorter Way"	June 2, 2019	0.3	1.11	0.3	1.01	0.6	2.12
2	"The Graveyard of What Might Be"	June 9, 2019	0.2	0.89	0.3	1.02	0.5	1.91
3	"The Gas Mask Man"	June 16, 2019	0.3	0.92	0.2	0.82	0.5	1.74
4	"The House of Sleep"	June 23, 2019	0.2	0.73	0.2	0.73	0.4	1.46
5	"The Wraith"	June 30, 2019	0.2	0.74	0.2	0.76	0.4	1.50
6	"The Dark Tunnels"	July 7, 2019	0.2	0.67	—N/a	0.74	—N/a	1.41
7	"Scissors for the Drifter"	July 14, 2019	0.2	0.66	0.2	0.83	0.4	1.49
8	"Parnassus"	July 21, 2019	0.2	0.78	—N/a	0.74	—N/a	1.52
9	"Sleigh House"	July 28, 2019	0.2	0.68	—N/a	0.64	—N/a	1.32
10	"Gunbarrel"	July 28, 2019	0.2	0.68	—N/a	0.64	—N/a	1.32

==== Season 2 ====
Viewership and ratings per episode of NOS4A2
No.	Title	Air date	Rating (18–49)	Viewers (millions)	DVR (18–49)	DVR viewers (millions)	Total (18–49)	Total viewers (millions)
1	"Bad Mother"	June 21, 2020	0.1	0.417	0.1	0.319	0.2	0.736
2	"Good Father"	June 28, 2020	0.1	0.432	0.1	0.287	0.2	0.719
3	"The Night Road"	July 5, 2020	0.1	0.385	0.1	0.334	0.2	0.719
4	"The Lake House"	July 12, 2020	0.1	0.341	—N/a	0.308	—N/a	0.649
5	"Bruce Wayne McQueen"	July 19, 2020	0.1	0.410	0.1	0.290	0.2	0.700
6	"The Hourglass"	July 26, 2020	0.1	0.404	0.1	0.329	0.2	0.733
7	"Cripple Creek"	August 2, 2020	0.1	0.360	0.1	0.313	0.2	0.673
8	"Chris McQueen"	August 9, 2020	0.1	0.333	0.1	0.208	0.2	0.541
9	"Welcome to Christmasland"	August 16, 2020	0.1	0.347	TBD	TBD	TBD	TBD
10	"Bats"	August 23, 2020	0.1	0.353	TBD	TBD	TBD	TBD

=== Accolades ===
Year	Association	Category	Nominee(s)	Result	Ref.
2019	Saturn Awards	Best Horror Television Series	NOS4A2	Nominated	

== See also ==
- List of Christmas films
