= Uncanny Annie =

- Into the Dark episode
- Episode no.: Season 2 Episode 13
- Directed by: Paul Davis
- Story by: Alan Blake Bachelor; James Bachelor
- Editing by: Yang Hua Hu
- Original air date: October 4, 2019
- Running time: 80 minutes

Guest appearances
- Adelaide Kane as Wendy; Georgie Flores as Eve; Paige McGhee as Grace; Jacques Colimon as Craig; Dylan Arnold as Michael; Evan Bittencourt as Peter; Karlisha Hurley as Annie; Camden Toy as The Prankster; Liam Graham as Dave; Avery Bagenstos as Tony

Episode chronology
← Previous "Pure"	Next → "Pilgrim"

"Uncanny Annie" is the thirteenth episode and first episode of the second season of Hulu's horror anthology streaming television series Into the Dark. The feature-length episode was directed by Paul Davis and focuses on the holiday of Halloween. It was released on Hulu on October 4, 2019.

== Plot ==
A group of young adults have gathered together to celebrate Halloween, as well as remember the death of their friend Tony, who died a year ago that night. They decide to play the board game "Uncanny Annie", despite no one recalling how the game came to be in the house. The rules require the group to successfully complete the requirements on a deck of cards included in the box, after which they can select a letter to spell out Annie's name. Once the name is complete the game will be over, however they will only have one hour before Annie will come to end the game herself.

The game doesn't strike any of them as overly strange until the tasks turn violent and bring out secrets that the group had been hiding from one another. One task requires that the group keep a card safe from a sinister entity, The Prankster, which they are unable to keep. As tasks grow more difficult many of the group die or are taken and during the course of the game the truth of Tony's death is revealed. The prior year Tony was trying to drive while very drunk and as a result, he was forced out of the car. Only part of the friend group was present, but none intervened, assuming that he would walk home in the pouring rain. It was implied that at some point he lost consciousness while face down in a puddle, drowning him.

Ultimately only Wendy is left. To avoid dying she destroys the game box in the hopes of also destroying Annie. While it initially appears successful, Wendy ends up being taken by Annie for breaking the rules.

== Cast ==
- Adelaide Kane as Wendy
- Georgie Flores as Eve
- Paige McGhee as Grace
- Jacques Colimon as Craig
- Dylan Arnold as Michael
- Evan Bittencourt as Peter
- Karlisha Hurley as Annie
- Camden Toy as The Prankster
- Liam Graham as Dave
- Avery Bagenstos as Tony

== Production ==
Director Paul Davis chose to create "Uncanny Annie" as he wanted to do something different from "The Body", which he had also directed for Into the Dark and which had also been focused on the holiday of Halloween. For the episode he wanted to "make a kids horror film with blood and swearing - inspired mostly by Joe Dante's The Hole and Robert Rodriguez's The Faculty." Actress Adelaide Kane was brought in to portray Wendy, one of the central characters; while Dylan Arnold was signed to portray one of the antagonists.

Filming for the episode took place over a period of 16 days and had a budget of just under US$1,000,000. Davis stated that he had a three-week prep time for filming once he was given an initial version of the script, which was still undergoing re-writes. Post-production was challenging for him, as he had to fly back to London due to the death of his mother.

== Release ==
"Uncanny Annie" premiered on the streaming service Hulu on October 4, 2019, followed by a screening at FrightFest that same year.

== Reception ==
"Uncanny Annie" has a rating of 75% on Rotten Tomatoes, based on a total of 12 reviews and with the consensus "Despite some weak lines, "Uncanny Annie" comes to light as an entertaining season premiere and a worthy addition to the spookiest holiday of the year." Film School Rejects and Slash Film both wrote favorable reviews for the episode, with the former stating that "These made-for-TV features will never measure up budget-wise to the movies hitting theaters, but they can surpass their bigger competition all the same with sharper writing and more interesting stories. Uncanny Annie does just that, and it deserves a bigger audience than the lesser likes of Oujia (2014) and Truth or Dare (2018) managed in theaters." A reviewer for RogerEbert.com gave it one star, as they felt that it was "as visually flat as anything to date in the “Into the Dark” series."
