= Pure (Into the Dark) =

- Into the Dark episode
- Episode no.: Season 1 Episode 12
- Directed by: Hannah Macpherson
- Story by: Paul Fischer; Paul Davis
- Teleplay by: Hannah Macpherson
- Cinematography by: Lyn Moncrief
- Editing by: Christopher M. Meagher
- Original air date: September 6, 2019
- Running time: 86 minutes

Guest appearances
- Jahkara Smith as Shay; McKaley Miller as Jo; Scott Porter as Pastor Seth; Annalisa Cochrane as Kellyann; Ciara Bravo as Lacey; Jim Klock as Kyle; T.C. Carter as Gabe

Episode chronology
← Previous "School Spirit"	Next → "Uncanny Annie"

"Pure" is the twelfth episode and final episode of the first season of Hulu's horror anthology streaming television series Into the Dark. The feature-length episode was directed by Hannah Macpherson, who also wrote the episode's teleplay. It was released on Hulu on September 6, 2019.

== Plot ==
Shay is attending a purity ball with her father Kyle and her rebellious half-sister Jo. She knows neither person very well as she only met them after the death of her mother two months prior. Jo is dismissive of the retreat, seeing it as patriarchal, antiquated nonsense, while Shay hopes to use it to grow closer to her dad. At the retreat, Shay and the other girls listen to sermons by conservative Pastor Seth about Lilith, who he portrays as lusty and sinful since she was created equal, and Eve, who he depicts as symbolic of women's weakness.

Later that night, Shay is included in a ritual to summon Lilith, which Jo secretly holds every year with her cabin mates. This year's ritual appears successful, and Shay starts experiencing strange phenomena, prompting her to investigate the ritual. She discovers that it can only be successful if one of the participants isn't a virgin, and that the ritual culminates with Lilith possessing that woman's body. Shay finds that she strongly disagrees with the retreat's ideals and methods, telling her cabin mates, one of whom is Seth's daughter Lacey, that they should exert control over their own bodies and sexuality. Jo decides to lose her virginity to her boyfriend, only to be caught and captured by her father and Seth.

At the purity ball on the following day, a distraught-ridden Jo admits to a worried Shay that Kyle had known about Shay since birth but deliberately chose to exclude her until now. Jo had kept this secret because she wanted her father's approval. This angers Shay, and when Seth tries to gather everyone to sign a purity contract, Shay refuses. She confesses to lying about her virginity for Kyle's approval, but she says that she's not ashamed of her sexuality.

Other girls stand up to their fathers and Lacey admits to not upholding her father's commands. She then kills herself with a gun Seth carried, unable to live with her feelings and the torture he put her through. Lilith enters the body of a pleading Shay and uses her powers to control and then kill the men before setting the retreat on fire, stating that she's watched women suffer for long enough. The girls are shown huddled on the floor before they are seen walking away to the woods, led by Lilith.

== Cast ==
- Jahkara Smith as Shay
- McKaley Miller as Jo
- Ciara Bravo as Lacey
- Annalisa Cochrane as Kellyann
- Scott Porter as Pastor Seth
- Jonathan Chase as Steve
- Jim Klock as Kyle
- T.C. Carter as Gabe
- Jose Velazquez as Jack
- Tara Parker as Lilith

== Production ==
Inspiration for "Pure" was taken from the Daughter's Day holiday, which is intended to celebrate daughters and recognize their worth. Hannah Macpherson directed the feature length episode and wrote its teleplay, which was based on a story she came up with alongside Paul Fischer and Paul Davis.

In an interview with Deadline Hollywood, Macpherson noted that she was not aware of the purity ball subculture before Blumhouse Television approached her with the film concept. She wanted the story to "stay far away from any mustache-twirling villains for the fathers" and wanted both the fathers and Pastor Seth to feel realistic and potentially relatable. Macpherson particularly wanted Seth to come across as initially "cool and charismatic and good-natured and passionate about his message". She also considered "Pure" to be a "reverse possession" film due to the character of Shay begging for possession and the power to "punish those who have taken the girls’ power away". Macpherson wanted this to be a discussion point, as she felt that it was "not about religion, although most religions should look at their approach to gender equality, but it's about power and control and oppression."

Jahkara Smith was brought on to portray one of the lead female roles, Shay, starring alongside McKaley Miller, who plays her half-sister Jo.

== Release ==
"Pure" was released onto Hulu on September 6, 2019. It was intended to coincide with Daughter's Day, which is traditionally held in September.

== Themes ==
"Pure" deals with themes of purity, female empowerment, and toxic masculinity. Elena Nicolaou of Refinery29 examined the episode's use of the Biblical figure of Lilith, which they noted had become more common in modern day media and looked to "[represent] a different model, another way forward". Nicolaou questioned whether the ending, which portrayed the girls walking into the forest guided by Lilith, was them "returning to the forest, historically the seat of a more feminine power" or a sign that they were "going to war". Macpherson has stated that the ending was meant to have "a ‘wiping the slate’ feeling", further remarking “What if Lilith had never been sent to Hell? What would a power structure where women were treated with the understanding that they can make choices themselves look like?”.

i09 noted that the episode's central thesis was that "Purity events aren’t for celebrating daughters, but for reinforcing traditional gender roles and men’s dominance over their lives." and that this issue "goes beyond faith, control, or systemic sexism. It’s about fighting for the right to be yourself."

== Reception ==
"Pure" holds a rating of 63% on Rotten Tomatoes, based on 8 reviews. Common criticisms centered upon its jump scares, which a reviewer for RogerEbert.com felt weakened what could have been a stronger episode. Elements of praise focused on the acting and the message of female autonomy and toxic masculinity. In a ranking of Into the Dark's episodes, Vulture ranked the episode at 14 and wrote that "What should be one of the most disturbing and powerful chapters of Into the Dark is a failure of execution more than concept."
