= Resurrection (2022 film) =

Film by Andrew Semans

- Theatrical release poster
- Directed by: Andrew Semans
- Written by: Andrew Semans
- Produced by: Tory Lenosky; Alex Scharfman; Drew Houpt; Lars Knudsen; Tim Headington; Lia Buman
- Starring: Rebecca Hall; Grace Kaufman; Michael Esper; Tim Roth; Angela Wong Carbone
- Cinematography: Wyatt Garfield
- Edited by: Ron Dulin
- Music by: Jim Williams
- Production companies: Tango Entertainment; Secret Engine; Square Peg; Rosetory
- Distributed by: IFC Films; Shudder
- Release dates: January 22, 2022 (Sundance); July 29, 2022 (United States)
- Running time: 103 minutes
- Country: United States
- Language: English
- Box office: $161,472

Resurrection is a 2022 American psychological thriller film written and directed by Andrew Semans. It stars Rebecca Hall, Grace Kaufman, Michael Esper, and Tim Roth. The plot follows Margaret (Hall) as she tries to maintain control of her life when an abusive ex-boyfriend (Roth) re-appears in her vicinity. The film was shot in Albany, NY and Williamsburg, Brooklyn.

Resurrection premiered at the Sundance Film Festival on January 22, 2022, and was released in the United States on July 29, 2022, by IFC Films and Shudder. The film received generally positive reviews from critics, who commended Hall's performance in the lead role.

== Plot ==
Margaret is a composed, successful businesswoman living in Albany, New York, and single mother to Abbie, who is leaving for college. She has an affair with Peter, her married co-worker. One day, Abbie finds a tooth in her wallet. Margaret misses a call from Abbie, who had a biking accident while drunk. During a work conference, Margaret notices David, a man from her past, also attending. She has a panic attack, runs home and prevents Abbie from seeing a friend.

Margaret has a nightmare about finding a baby in the oven. She becomes irritable and attempts to have sex with Peter at their workplace. She sees David again while shopping and runs off with Abbie, who becomes wary of her behavior. Margaret confronts David, who claims that "Ben is with me" and smiles, his mouth missing a tooth. Margaret goes to the police but receives no help. She has new locks installed and purchases a gun.

Margaret explains her relationship with David to a disturbed co-worker: she met him at the age of 18 and moved in with him after two weeks. While initially charming, David soon became abusive and controlling. He asked Margaret to give "kindnesses", which were essentially acts of self-harm or personal humiliation, in return for his love. She gave birth to a son named Benjamin, who became his target for jealousy. One day she returned home to find Ben gone but for two fingers; David claimed to have eaten him. Margaret became catatonic and David manipulated her into believing their dead son was alive inside him. She eventually fled to the United States.

Margaret asks David to leave. However, David continues to manipulate her and implies she is responsible for Abbie's accident. He leaves a key to his hotel room, where Margaret finds Ben's baby blanket. She wakes up the next day lactating. Margaret learns David's routine and plans to kill him at a bench near a river. Abbie and Peter ask her to seek help, but she drives both away. As she tries to kill David, he overpowers her. A delusional and exhausted Margaret hears Ben's cries from David's stomach. David chastises Margaret for trying to kill him and asks for another "kindness": she is to hold a stress position in a public park at night for hours.

The next morning, a scared Abbie runs away from Margaret. Peter, who has been watching Margaret out of worry, confesses his love to her, but she punches and threatens him. David visits Margaret at work and asks her to come to a hotel room. She writes a goodbye letter to Abbie and records a video message. At the hotel room, David makes Margaret feel his stomach and claims that Ben is moving. Margaret attacks him with knives, ties him up to the bed and slices open his stomach, killing him. She pulls out his intestines, apparently finding a breathing fetus that she holds with care.

Abbie is seen leaving home for college. She lovingly says goodbye to Margaret, who is holding the baby. Abbie thanks her for keeping her safe as Margaret allows her to hold the baby herself. However, Margaret's smile slowly fades away before she gasps in terror.

== Cast ==
- Rebecca Hall as Margaret
- Grace Kaufman as Abbie
- Michael Esper as Peter
- Tim Roth as David
- Angela Wong Carbone as Gwyn

== Production ==
Andrew Semans' screenplay made the 2019 Black List of most popular unproduced scripts from up-and-coming screenwriters. Producer Alex Scharfman stated "I just could not stop reading it" when he first happened upon the script.

Principal photography took place on location in Albany, New York, in mid-2021 and later in Williamsburg, Brooklyn. It was then announced Rebecca Hall and Tim Roth were attached to star in the film.

== Release ==
It premiered at the 2022 Sundance Film Festival on January 22, 2022. IFC Films then acquired the North American theatrical and VOD distribution rights to the film, with Shudder taking the first streaming window. It was given a limited theatrical release on July 29, 2022, prior to being released on video on demand on August 5, 2022.

== Reception ==
On the review aggregator website Rotten Tomatoes, 81% of 189 critics' reviews are positive, with an average rating of 7/10. The website's consensus reads: "Uneven yet steadily absorbing, Resurrection benefits greatly from Rebecca Hall's outstanding work in the leading role." Metacritic, which uses a weighted average, assigned the film a score of 70 out of 100, based on 28 critics, indicating "generally favorable" reviews.

=== Accolades ===
The film was screened as part of the American Independents Competition of the 46th Cleveland International Film Festival, held from March 30 to April 9, 2022. It also competed for Official Fantàstic Competition's Best Feature-Length Film at the 55th Sitges Film Festival in October 2022.

Award	Date of ceremony	Category	Recipient(s)	Result	Ref.
Critics' Choice Super Awards	March 16, 2023	Best Actress in a Horror Movie	Rebecca Hall	Nominated	
Fangoria Chainsaw Awards	May 21, 2023	Best Limited Release Movie	Resurrection	Nominated	
Fangoria Chainsaw Awards	May 21, 2023	Best Lead Performance	Rebecca Hall	Nominated	
