= Grace Kaufman =

American actress

- Born: April 29, 2002 (age 24); Los Angeles, California, U.S.
- Occupation: Actress
- Years active: 2009–present
- Known for: Kate on Man with a Plan
- Father: David Kaufman

Grace Kaufman (born April 29, 2002) is an American actress, known for her roles including Deema in Bubble Guppies, Kate Burns in the CBS sitcom Man with a Plan (2016–2020), Bronwen in the CBS sitcom Bad Teacher (2014), Ashley Chandler in the TNT action-drama series The Last Ship (2014–2018), and Berry in Disney's Whisker Haven Tales with the Palace Pets (2015–2018).

Kaufman's feature film debut came in Sister(2014).

== Early life ==
Kaufman was born in Los Angeles, California on April 29, 2002. Her parents are actor David Kaufman and actress Lisa Picotte. Her first acting role was in the 2009 stage production of Meet Me in St. Louis at the Carpenter Performing Arts Center. Her paternal grandfather is Jewish, whereas her paternal grandmother is Catholic.

== Recognition ==
In 2012, Kaufman received the Best Actress award at the HollyShorts Film Festival. In 2014, she won the Discovery Award at the Traverse City Film Festival.

== Filmography ==
=== Film ===
Year	Title	Role	Notes
2014	Sister	Nikki Presser	
2022	The Sky Is Everywhere	Lennie Walker	
2022	Resurrection	Abbie	

=== Television ===
Year	Title	Role	Notes
2012	Jessie	Tanya Weston	Episode: "A Doll's Outhouse"
2013, 2015	Lab Rats	Kerry Perry	2 episodes
2013–2016	Bubble Guppies	Deema	Voice, main role (seasons 3–4)
2013–2018	Clarence	Chelsea Keezheekoni, Bree	Voice, 40 episodes
2014	Bad Teacher	Bronwen	Main role
2014	2 Broke Girls	Young Max	Episode: "And the Childhood Not Included"
2014	Mickey Mouse Clubhouse	Melody Mouse	Voice, episode: "Minnie's Winter Bow Show"
2014–2018	The Last Ship	Ashley Chandler	Main role
2015–2018	Whisker Haven	Berry	Voice, 19 episodes
2016–2020	Man with a Plan	Kate Burns	Main role (59 episodes)
2017	Shimmer and Shine	Imma	Voice, episode: "Rainbow Zahramay"
2017–2020	Mickey and the Roadster Racers	Melody Mouse	Voice
2019	Where's Waldo?	Morna	Voice, episode: "The Strength of Scotland"
2020–2021	The Fungies!	Champsa, Holk	Voice, recurring role

=== Video games ===
Year	Title	Role	Notes
2020	Tell Me Why	Young Tyler	
2021	Psychonauts 2	Lizzie	
