= Jandy Nelson =

American author (born 1965)

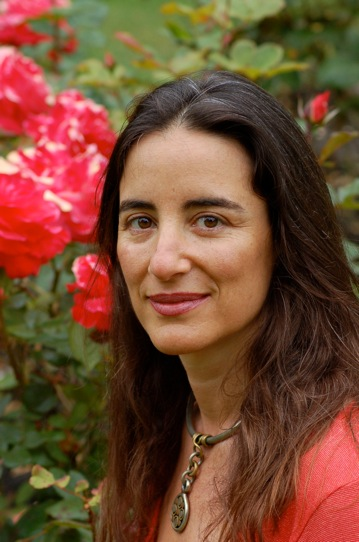
- Nelson in 2014
- Born: November 25, 1965 (age 60); New York City, New York, United States
- Education: Brown University; Cornell University (BA)
- Occupation: Author
- Writing career
- Genres: Children's literature, young adult fiction
- Notable works: The Sky Is Everywhere; I'll Give You the Sun
- Notable awards: Michael L. Printz Award; 2015 I'll Give You the Sun Stonewall Honor; 2015 I'll Give You the Sun Josette Frank Award; 2015 I'll Give You the Sun
- Website: jandynelson.com

Jandy Nelson (born November 25, 1965) is an American author. Prior to her career as an author, Nelson worked for 13 years as a literary agent at Manus & Associates Literary Agency. She holds a Bachelor of Arts from Cornell University as well as several Master of Fine Arts degrees. She later attended Vermont College of Fine Arts.

== Personal life ==
Nelson and her mother moved to California when she was twelve years old. She currently lives in San Francisco.

== Works ==
Nelson's 2010 novel, The Sky Is Everywhere, follows seventeen-year-old Lennie Walker as she copes with her sister's death. Torn between loss and self-discovery, Lennie must learn to be the lead player in her own life. The Sky Is Everywhere was a Young Adult Library Services Association (YALSA) selection for Best Fiction for Young Adults; made numerous appearances on best-of-the-year lists, including those for NPR, the Chicago Public Library, The Horn Book Magazine, and the Children's Book Committee (CBC) of Bank Street College of Education; and as of April 2015 had been published in over 20 countries.

Nelson's second novel, New York Times bestseller I'll Give You the Sun, was published in 2014; it is about close but highly competitive twins Noah and Jude. A series of family tragedies, cruelties and misunderstandings creates a rift between the two; only after they come back together do they begin to understand themselves and set their world right again. I'll Give You the Sun won the Printz Award and the CBC's Josette Frank Award for older readers (sharing the award for younger readers with Ann M. Martin's Rain Reign), plus was a Stonewall Book Award Honor Book. It was a 2014 California Book Awards Young Adult Finalist. It was listed on numerous best-of-the-year lists, including the 2015 YALSA Top 10 Best Fiction for Young Adults, NPR's Guide To 2014's Great Reads, Time magazine's Top 10 YA Books, the ALA Rainbow Book List Top 10, and CBC's Best Children's Book of the Year with Outstanding Merit. As of April 2015, I'll Give You the Sun had been published in 25 countries and optioned by Warner Bros. for a film to be written by Natalie Krinsky and produced by Denise Di Novi and Allison Greenspan.

== Bibliography ==
- The Sky Is Everywhere (2010)
- I'll Give You the Sun (2014)
- When the World Tips Over (2024)
