= Jacques Colimon =

American actor (b.1994)

- Born: Jacques Gerard Colimon; August 27, 1994 (age 30); Los Angeles, California, U.S.
- Occupation: Actor
- Years active: 2012–present

Jacques Gerard Colimon (born August 27, 1994) is an American actor. He is known for his roles in The Society and The Sky Is Everywhere.

== Filmography ==
=== Film ===
Year	Title	Role	Notes
2012	Sweet Old World	Ethan Hinkle	
2016	The Golden Rut	Street Guy	
2017	When We Burn Out	Devin	
2018	Age Out	Laborer	
2018	Blood Brother	Additional voices	
2019	UglyDolls	Sporko	
2020	Nocturne	Max	
2021	Collection	Sean	
2022	The Sky Is Everywhere	Joe Fontaine	

=== Television ===
Year	Title	Role	Notes
2016	Day 5	Gamer	Episode: "Wide Awake"
2016	Todd Bless You	Brad's Crony 1	Television film
2019	The Society	Will LeClair	10 episodes
2019	Into the Dark	Craig	Episode: "Uncanny Annie"
2023	Fright Krewe	Belial (voice)	10 episodes
2025	Eyes of Wakanda	Basha (voice)	Episode: "Lost and Found"
