= Guarding Stars =

2026 film by Elizabeth Allen Rosenbaum

- Release poster
- Directed by: Elizabeth Allen Rosenbaum
- Screenplay by: Erin Cardillo; Richard Keith; Gina Matthews; Grant Scharbo
- Based on: The Bodyguard by Katherine Center
- Produced by: Jared Padalecki; Genevieve Padalecki; Gina Matthews; Grant Scharbo
- Starring: Leighton Meester; Jared Padalecki; Noah LaLonde; Phil Brooks; Andie MacDowell
- Cinematography: Matt Sakatani Roe
- Edited by: Emma E. Hickox
- Music by: Robert Duncan
- Production companies: Living in the Asterisk; Little Engine Productions
- Distributed by: Netflix
- Release date: November 18, 2026
- Running time: 110 minutes
- Country: United States
- Language: English

Guarding Stars is a 2026 American Christmas romantic comedy film directed by Elizabeth Allen Rosenbaum from a screenplay by Erin Cardillo, Richard Keith, Gina Matthews, and Grant Scharbo, based on the 2022 novel The Bodyguard by Katherine Center. It stars Leighton Meester, Jared Padalecki, Noah LaLonde, Phil Brooks, and Andie MacDowell.

The film was released on Netflix on November 18, 2026.

== Plot ==
No-nonsense bodyguard Hannah Brooks and her team—consisting of Robbie, Taylor, and Doghouse—are assigned to protect popular action film star Jack Stapleton from a stalker during the holiday season. Hannah and Jack immediately clash. As Hannah discreetly escorts Jack to a hospital in Montana to visit his mother, Connie, who has undergone surgery to remove a tumor, his family inadvertently spots him with her. Assuming that Hannah is Jack's girlfriend, Connie invites her to spend Christmas with the family at their ranch in Montana. Hannah reluctantly agrees to pose as Jack's girlfriend to avoid worrying his mother.

One day, Hannah finds Jack with his family at the local rodeo, where his younger brother Hank is riding, even though she had forbidden him from making a public appearance for his safety. When Hannah and Jack are caught by the rodeo's kiss cam, the two are forced to kiss. The announcer reveals Jack's presence, prompting Hannah to escort him out of the venue. As they grow closer, Jack tells Hannah about his brother Drew, who died in a car accident after the two went to a bar to celebrate Jack's first major Hollywood role. Since then, Jack has avoided coming home.

On Christmas Eve, Connie thanks Hannah for bringing her son back to the ranch. That evening, as the family watches a home movie of Jack and Drew from their childhood, Hank accuses Jack of abandoning him and the rest of the family after Drew's death to focus on his film career. Connie suddenly falls ill and is rushed to the hospital. As Connie recuperates, Hank clarifies that he never blamed Jack for Drew's death, and the two brothers share a hug.

When asked by Jack why she hums herself to sleep, Hannah explains that it is something her recently deceased mother used to do, though she never knew the name of the song. The two fall asleep together. The next morning, Hannah's team finds two hanged dolls depicting Hannah and Jack at the front gate, and their kiss has been widely reported in the media. Upon learning that Hannah has to be replaced as his security detail now that she is a target as well, Jack offers himself as bait at the town's Christmas parade in order to catch his stalker.

At the parade that night, Hannah spots a suspicious man she had seen at the hospital. Her team identifies him as Jessie Turner, who was dishonorably discharged from Special Forces. The parade float's lights suddenly blow out, and in the ensuing chaos, Jack is taken to safety by Deputy Nadine Turner, a former high school classmate of his. On the drive, Nadine reveals herself to be Jack's stalker. She tells him that she has left her husband for Jack and that he is the love of her life. Hannah pursues Nadine's squad car on horseback, and with help from her security team, Nadine is arrested.

Jack confesses to his family that Hannah was only his bodyguard, and she leaves the ranch after saying goodbye to the Stapletons. Back home in New York City, Hannah unwraps a Christmas present from Jack: a record player and a vinyl record of Roy Orbison's "Beautiful Dreamer", the song her mother used to sing to her. Encouraged by his mother to confess his feelings for Hannah, Jack goes to see her, but she claims she does not reciprocate his feelings. Realizing that she avoided eye contact with him, he suspects she lied and is in danger.

Jack climbs the fire escape into Hannah's apartment, where she has been taken hostage by Jessie, Nadine's ex-husband, who blames her for taking Nadine away from him. A fight ensues between Jack and Jessie. When Jessie fires his gun at Hannah, Jack throws himself in front of her and is wounded in the shoulder. After Hannah incapacitates Jessie, she and Jack kiss.

A year later at the Stapleton ranch, the family is watching Jack's latest film, Guarded Hearts, which is based on Hannah and Jack's story. Jack then proposes to Hannah, who accepts.

== Cast ==
- Leighton Meester as Hannah Brooks
- Jared Padalecki as Jack Stapleton
- Andie MacDowell as Connie Stapleton
- Noah LaLonde as Hank Stapleton
- Shaun Johnston as Doc Stapleton
- Toby Sandeman as Robbie
- Rachael Ancheril as Taylor
- Phil Brooks as Doghouse
- Siobhan Williams as Ella Mae
- Greg Lawson as Glen
- Tess Degenstein as Deputy Nadine Turner
- Walker Hayes as Sheriff Sanderson
- Zoe Kosovic as Clementine
- Henrik Bosovich as Wyatt
- Jake Foy as Brody
- Giles Panton as creepy guy/Jessie
- Genevieve Padalecki as Anna
- Bryan McHale as Dr. Eric Dehaan
- Ava Max as Kennedy Monroe

== Production ==
On September 18, 2025, it was announced that Jared Padalecki and Leighton Meester would star in a film adaptation of Katherine Center's 2022 novel The Bodyguard, with Elizabeth Allen Rosenbaum serving as director. On November 20, 2025, it was announced that Andie MacDowell, Walker Hayes, Noah LaLonde and Toby Sanderman would feature in the film, with Erin Cardillo and Richard Keith as writers and Gina Matthews, Grant Scharbo and Jared and Genevieve Padalecki as producers. On December 3, 2025 CM Punk joined the cast. On January 7, 2026, it was revealed that the film would be titled Guarding Stars.

== Release ==
Guarding Stars was released on Netflix on November 18, 2026.
