= My Life with the Walter Boys (novel) =

2014 novel by Ali Novak

- First edition cover
- Author: Ali Novak
- Language: English
- Genre: Young adult, Romance
- Publisher: Sourcebooks Fire
- Publication date: March 1, 2014 (print)
- Publication place: United States
- Pages: 358 (first edition)
- ISBN: 1728205476
- Followed by: My Return to the Walter Boys

My Life with the Walter Boys is a Young adult romance novel by Ali Novak, and the first installment in the Walter Boys series. The novel was first released online through the reading website Wattpad in 2010. A Netflix television adaptation of the same name began streaming in 2023, which starred Nikki Rodriguez as Jackie Howard.

The book received mixed reviews from critics.

== Plot ==
Jackie Howard is a brilliant, hardworking 15-year-old from Manhattan, New York who knows what goals she wants to achieve. Tragically, all members of her family except her get killed in a car accident. Having no family left, Jackie is sent to live at a farm in Colorado owned by Katherine Walter, her deceased mother's best friend.

Katherine Walter and her husband George have 12 sons with different characters, habits, and weaknesses that bring constant disorder into their lives. Jackie cannot adapt to the noise and chaos at first since she was used to having a neat and calm place to study and do other things but starts enjoying the ranch life. Jackie tried to get accustomed to living in Colorado surrounded by the Walter kids. Gradually, Jackie gets closer to several brothers. First, there is Alex Walter – the scholarly and kind-hearted son who shares her passions, memories and resembles her previous life. At the same time, she becomes emotionally attached to Cole Walter, Alex's older brother. He is charming, reckless and makes her think of him.

Staying with the Walter boys provides Jackie with useful experience. The brothers challenge her in numerous situations, helping her realize that she should stop striving for perfection and enjoy moments of her life instead. Thus, playing jokes with them, having heated arguments, staying up until midnight, talking with their mom and participating in other activities allow Jackie to find her niche.

Developing relationships with Alex and Cole, Jackie is forced to make a choice. Alex reminds her of safety and stability; however, Cole makes her feel passion and danger. These two sides of her personality are brought out during the brothers' discussions and conflicts, making Jackie question her wishes and desires.

Jackie understands that her trip to Colorado is not only about romance. Being a witness to the life of twelve brothers, she copes with grief and starts developing personal characteristics that will help her become independent and face life challenges in the future.

== Characters ==
- Jackie Howard: A girl from New York City who loses her family in a car accident and relocates to Colorado.
- Katherine Walter: The mother of the Walter boys.
- George Walter: The father of the Walter boys.
- Cole Walter: One of the older Walter brothers comes across as smooth-talking and flirtatious. Though he appears to be a typical player, a deeper, more genuine and compassionate side underlies his exterior.
- Alex Walter: Another older Walter brothers. Deeply devoted to his family, he becomes particularly protective and develops a bond with Jackie.
- Will Walter: The oldest of the Walter boys.
- Danny Walter: One of the oldest Walter brothers, is marked by his grounded and responsible demeanor.
- Parker Walter: The only girl among the Walter siblings.
- Nathan Walter: One of the middle Walter brothers.
- Lee Garcia: The cousins of the Walter siblings who resides with them.
- Isaac Garcia: The Walter siblings’ cousin, loves sports and has a competitive nature.
- Jordan Walter: The youngest of the Walter boys.
- Zack Walter:
- Jack Walter: One of the younger brothers in the Walter family.
- Benny Walter:

== Writing ==
Ali Novak's began writing fiction as a teenager and completed her first full-length novel, My Life with the Walter Boys, at the age of fifteen. Later, Novak continued her education at the University of Wisconsin-Madison studying creative writing. Following her publication of My Life with the Walter Boys on the online storytelling platform Wattpad, the novel gained popularity and received over twenty-four million online reads before getting published as a printed book by Sourcebooks in 2014. According to Novak, online resources have been an essential part of her writing career, helping her get feedback from readers and collaborate with them through sharing unfinished versions of her works.

== Reception ==
The book received mixed critical reception. Writing for The Guardian, Hannah Love described the novel as “a fun, light-hearted read” but noted that some of the Walter brothers came across as exaggerated stereotypes rather than fully developed characters.

Other critics were less favorable. A reviewer from The Pathfinder called the book 'formulaic' and argued that it relied too heavily on common teen-drama tropes such as love triangles and sibling rivalry.

Accolades

The book was also nominated for a Goodreads Choice Award in the Young Adult Fiction category, and was included on YALSA’s Teens’ Top 10 list.

List of Awards and nominations for My Life with the Walter Boys
Year	Award	Result	Ref
2015	Goodreads Choice Award	Nominated	
2015	YALSA's Teen Top Ten Reads award	Won	

== Adaptation ==
=== TV series ===
In December 2023, Netflix released a television adaptation of the novel starring Nikki Rodriguez as Jackie, Noah LaLonde as Cole, and Ashby Gentry as Alex.
