= Corey Fogelmanis =

American actor (born 1999)

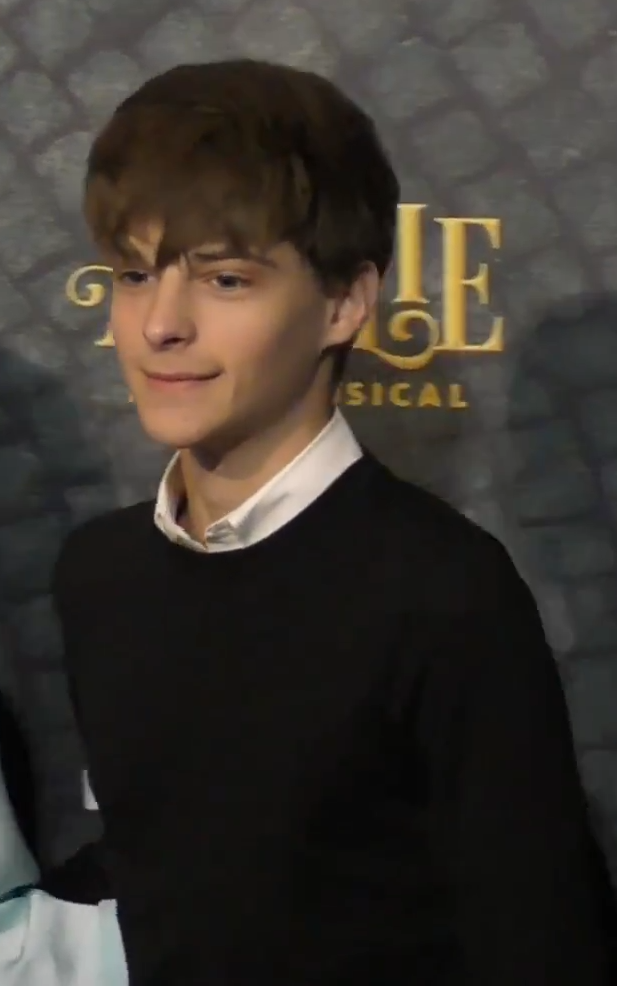
- Fogelmanis in 2016
- Born: August 13, 1999 (age 27); Thousand Oaks, California, U.S.
- Occupation: Actor
- Years active: 2011–present

Corey Fogelmanis (/ˌfoʊɡəlˈmænɪs/; born August 13, 1999) is an American actor. He is best known for his role as Farkle Minkus on the Disney Channel sitcom Girl Meets World (2014–2017). He also starred in the horror films Ma (2019), for which he was nominated for a Teen Choice Award, and Carved (2024) and in the coming-of-age film I Wish You All the Best (2024). Since 2023, he has starred as Nathan Walter in the Netflix teen drama series My Life with the Walter Boys.

== Early and personal life ==
Fogelmanis was born on August 13, 1999 in Thousand Oaks, California. He was raised in Camarillo. He has one sister and his father previously worked as a delivery driver for UPS.

Fogelmanis moved to New York City in 2019 and, during the COVID-19 pandemic, took a break from acting and began attending college. He studied acting at Anthony Meindl's Actor Workshop and for one semester at The New School. Also in 2020, he came out as queer in an Instagram post. As of 2025, he lives in Brooklyn.

== Career ==
Fogelmanis began performing in musicals for his local theater at age six, performing with the Conejo Players Theatre, and began his career in television and film at age 12. He appeared in guest roles on the CBS series Partners, the Showtime series House of Lies (both 2012), and the Disney Channel series I Didn't Do It (2014). From 2014 to 2017, he starred on the Disney Channel series Girl Meets World, a spinoff of the ABC series Boy Meets World, as the eccentric and intelligent high school student Farkle Minkus, who is also the son of Boy Meets World characters Stuart Minkus and Jennifer Bassett. In December 2015, he appeared as John Darling in the play Peter Pan and Tinker Bell – A Pirates Christmas at the Pasadena Playhouse alongside Girl Meets World cast members Sabrina Carpenter and August Maturo. He also starred in the 2016 film R.L. Stine's Mostly Ghostly: One Night In Doom House.

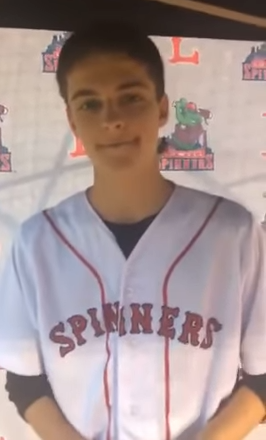
Fogelmanis in 2017

Fogelmanis then starred in the Hazel Hayes–directed thriller miniseries PrankMe for the defunct company Fullscreen as Jasper Perkins, a social media prankster who becomes a murderer. The series premiered in September 2017. He starred as Nate in the 2018 horror film #SquadGoals and as high schooler Andy Hawkins, the love interest of protagonist Maggie (played by Diana Silvers), in the 2019 horror film Ma. For his role in Ma, he was nominated for the Teen Choice Award for Choice Summer Movie Actor. In the 11th episode of the first season of the Hulu horror anthology series Into the Dark, "School Spirit", he starred as awkward high school student Brett. He had a cameo in the Amy Poehler–directed film Moxie in 2021.

In 2022, Fogelmanis appeared as Jude Bruneau in the fourth episode of the sixteenth season of Criminal Minds. In 2023, he began starring as Nathan Walter, an openly gay teenage musician with epilepsy, in the Netflix teen drama series My Life with the Walter Boys. He starred in the 2024 Hulu horror comedy film Carved as Cody, the boyfriend of protagonist Kira (played by Peyton Elizabeth Lee). In 2022, Fogelmanis was cast in the coming-of-age film I Wish You All the Best, which was adapted from Mason Deaver's 2019 novel of the same name and was actress Tommy Dorfman's directorial debut, in the lead role of Ben DeBacker (later known in the film as B.), a non-binary high school junior who gets kicked out of their home upon coming out. The film first premiered at South by Southwest in March 2024 and was released in theaters and digitally in November 2025. Nell Minow, writing for RogerEbert.com, praised Fogelmanis's performance as "beautiful", while Luna Guthrie of Collider called it "heart-wrenching" and wrote that it displayed a "range and depth of emotion". Dennis Harvey of Variety wrote that Ben's internal conflict was not "dramatized very vividly" by Fogelmanis but that he "holds central focus strongly enough in most respects" within the film.

Fogelmanis starred in the Linda Yellen film One Stupid Thing, which premiered at the Boston International Film Festival in April 2025. He and singer Conan Gray appeared together as gay lovers Brando and Wilson, respectively, in three music videos for singles from Conan Gray's 2025 studio album Wishbone, which were released from May to August of that year: "This Song", "Vodka Cranberry", and "Caramel". He also appeared onstage for Gray's Romeo and Juliet–based performance of "Vodka Cranberry" at the 2025 MTV Video Music Awards, in which he portrayed Juliet. He is set to appear in David Fincher's upcoming film The Further Mis-Adventures of Cliff Booth, a sequel to the Quentin Tarantino film Once Upon a Time in Hollywood which is scheduled for release in November 2026.

== Filmography ==
Key
†	Denotes productions that have not yet been released

=== Television ===
Year	Title	Role	Notes
2012	House of Lies	T-Bird in Play	Episode: "Gods of Dangerous Financial Instruments"
2012	Partners	Louis at 12	Episode: "Pilot"
2014–2017	Girl Meets World	Farkle Minkus	Main cast; 71 episodes
2015	I Didn't Do It	Stevie Moops	Episode: "Stevie Likes Lindy"
2017	PrankMe	Jasper Perkins	Main cast; 8 episodes
2019	Into the Dark	Brett	Episode: "School Spirit"
2022	Criminal Minds	Jude Bruneau	Episode: "Pay-Per-View"
2023–present	My Life with the Walter Boys	Nathan Walter	Main cast; 20 episodes

=== Film ===
Year	Title	Role	Notes
2016	R.L. Stine's Mostly Ghostly: One Night In Doom House	Max Doyle	Direct-to-video film
2018	#SquadGoals	Nate	
2019	Ma	Andy	
2021	Moxie	Mark	
2024	I Wish You All the Best	Ben DeBacker	
2024	Carved	Cody	
2025	One Stupid Thing	Jamie	
2026	The Further Mis-Adventures of Cliff Booth	TBA	

=== Music videos ===
Year	Title	Artist
2025	"This Song"	Conan Gray
2025	"Vodka Cranberry"	Conan Gray
2025	"Caramel"	Conan Gray

=== Theatre ===
Year	Title	Role	Notes
2026	Rope	Nate Singer	
