= Life Sentence (TV series) =

American comedy-drama television series (2018)

- Genre: Comedy drama; Family drama
- Created by: Erin Cardillo; Richard Keith
- Starring: Lucy Hale; Elliot Knight; Jayson Blair; Brooke Lyons; Carlos PenaVega; Gillian Vigman; Dylan Walsh; Nadej Bailey
- Narrated by: Lucy Hale
- Composer: Waz-Jackson
- Country of origin: United States
- Original language: English
- No. of seasons: 1
- No. of episodes: 13

Production
- Executive producers: Erin Cardillo; Richard Keith; Oliver Goldstick; Bill Lawrence; Jeff Ingold; Lee Toland Krieger
- Producers: Liza Katzer; Bonnie Weis
- Production locations: Atlanta, Georgia (pilot); Vancouver, British Columbia
- Cinematography: Kamal Derkaoui
- Editors: Robert Meed; Lise Johnson; Melissa Gearhart; Melissa McCoy
- Camera setup: Single-camera
- Running time: 40–42 minutes
- Production companies: In Good Company; Doozer; CBS Television Studios; Warner Bros. Television

Original release
- Network: The CW
- Release: March 7 – June 15, 2018

Life Sentence (stylized onscreen as L!fe Sentence) is an American comedy-drama television series, created by Erin Cardillo and Richard Keith, which debuted on The CW as a midseason entry during the 2017–18 television season. The series premiered on March 7, 2018, and concluded on June 15, 2018, with a total of 13 episodes.

On May 8, 2018, The CW cancelled Life Sentence after one season.

== Premise ==
When Stella Abbott finds out her terminal cancer is cured, she is going to have to learn to live with all the choices she made when she decided to "live like she was dying". As she adjusts to her post-cancer world, she learns how her husband and family must also deal with the self-destructive choices they made to help Stella enjoy what they thought were her final years.

== Cast and characters ==
=== Main ===
- Lucy Hale as Stella Abbott
- Elliot Knight as Wes Charles
- Jayson Blair as Aiden Abbott
- Brooke Lyons as Elizabeth Abbott Rojas
- Carlos PenaVega as Diego Rojas
- Gillian Vigman as Ida Abbott
- Dylan Walsh as Peter Abbott
- Nadej Bailey as Sadie

=== Recurring ===
- Anna Enger as Helena Chang, Stella's doctor
- Claudia Rocafort as Poppy, Ida's ex-girlfriend and Stella's godmother
- Dominique Lucky Martell as Fiona Abbott Rojas, Elizabeth and Diego's daughter
  - Noor Anna Maher played the role in the pilot episode.
- Sebastian Vargas as Frank Abbott Rojas, Elizabeth and Diego's son
  - Emanuel Eaton played the role in the pilot episode.
- Alyshia Ochse as Marlene
- Shannon Chan-Kent as Finley, Stella's cynical boss at the coffee shop
- Lindsey Maxwell as Denise
- Riley Smith as Dr. Will Grant, an oncologist
- Bre Blair as Lauren
- Rana Roy as Pippa, Wes' ex-fiancée
- Alyssa Diaz as Kayla, Aiden's friend and coworker
- Valerie Cruz as Gina, Diego's boss and Peter's love interest

== Episodes ==
No.	Title	Directed by	Written by	Original release date	Prod. code	U.S. viewers (millions)
1	"Pilot"	Lee Toland Krieger	Erin Cardillo & Richard Keith	March 7, 2018	T25.10101	0.67
When 24-year-old Stella Abbott finds out her cancer is cured after eight years of treatments, her life starts changing for the worse. First, she finds out her mother, Ida, is having an affair with her friend, who is also Stella's hippie godmother, Poppy. Then, while Stella babysits her older sister Elizabeth's children, she begins to feel like her new husband, Wes, has been hiding things from her for the whole of their six-month marriage. To pile it all together, Stella's immature and irresponsible older brother, Aiden, has been guilt-tripping hot married women into sleeping with him by using Stella's cancer, including Marlene, his latest conquest. As Stella hosts a thank-you party for her doctor, she figures it might be an easy way to fix all her family's problems in one go, however everything seemingly continues to get worse; Ida comes out as bisexual, Peter reveals that they are broke from unwisely applying multiple mortgages on their house for Stella's cancer treatments, Elizabeth resents Stella's illness always coming first before everything and that she turned down a college offer to study writing so Elizabeth could stay in their small Oregon town to help take care of Stella, and the angry husband of the wife Aiden is having an affair with shows up and starts a fistfight with Aiden. Angry and alienated, Stella returns to the hospital alone and looks at the view of the city from her old hospital bed. As Stella speaks to another cancer patient, a young girl named Sadie, she realizes that Wes is always going to be there for her. The two reconcile and Stella starts to see her family become healthier.
2	"Re-Inventing the Abbotts"	John T. Kretchmer	Erin Cardillo & Richard Keith	March 14, 2018	T13.20952	0.56
Stella and Wes try to fix their quick six-month old marriage when a U.S. Immigration agent stops by to find out if their marriage is fraudulent, warning the two that her determination could result in Wes being deported. The truth, that he married an American citizen who was expected to die within months anyway, doesn’t help. Peter and Ida get an offer on the heavily mortgaged (to finance Stella's “final” years) house, which Peter is reluctant to take. As a result, Ida takes a sledgehammer to a wall and digs a hole in the backyard. Meanwhile, Aiden hides from a newly pregnant Marlene despite Stella's nagging him to deal with what he has caused.
3	"Clinical Trial and Error"	David Warren	Margaret Easley & Laura Putney	March 21, 2018	T13.20954	0.49
Stella volunteers at the hospital, where she learns Sadie doesn't have anyone on her side. She, and Sadie's new oncologist, the attractive and good-natured Dr. William Grant, petition the wealthy private funder of the last clinical trial that unexpectedly saved Stella to restart that trial, but the funder reveals that the FDA shut it down because Stella was the only one who survived. Stella, who doesn’t bother thanking him for spending his millions to save her life, tells Sadie that they can try to get her into one of 17 other trials. Stella takes a job at a local coffee shop and she also makes Wes babysit Diego and Elizabeth's children on his own, but while he is babysitting, Fiona becomes ill and Wes asks Ida for help, however she over-reacts, flashing back to the dangers of Stella situation during her cancer years. Elsewhere, Aiden takes his father, Peter, on a "lads night out" to help him get over his breakup from Ida, which results in him sleeping with a recent divorcée named Lauren, whom Aiden has previously slept with.
4	"How Stella Got Her Groove On"	Roger Kumble	Lisa Melamed & Erin Cardillo & Richard Keith	March 28, 2018	T13.20953	0.40
Stella finds out that she never graduated from high school since she dropped out at age 16 when she was first diagnosed with cancer and has no marketable skills. Meanwhile, Aiden finds out Marlene is rich and moves in with her, and subsequently get engaged, until they find out Marlene's baby isn't his. Stella catches Wes on video chat to a woman called Linda and mistakenly thinks he is giving her a strip tease, but he is only working on web investments overseas in his native England. Also, Diego takes Wes to kickball to work out his stress. Stella tries to get promoted to manager at the coffee shop, and her dad gets her a high school diploma from their principal.
5	"Wes Side Story"	Arlene Sanford	Oliver Goldstick	April 4, 2018	T13.20955	0.44
Stella and Dr. Grant find out about a new clinical trial for Sadie, however Stella refuses to meet the composer due to her and Wes planning a 'love bubble' to get back into a romantic rhythm. As Wes and Stella enter their love bubble, Pippa, Wes' ex-fiancée from London, arrives at Stella's door, giving Stella a lot of questions. Meanwhile, Peter and Lauren grow closer, but Ida grows wary after she pressures him into taking drugs. She reveals to Peter that Aiden and Lauren slept together, and subsequently they find out about Aiden's drug selling business.
6	"Who Framed Stella Abbott?"	Norman Buckley	Nelson Soler	April 27, 2018	T13.20956	0.42
Stella has a sexual fantasy about Dr. Grant, then a second one in the middle of instigating sex with Wes, causing her to stop. Elizabeth returns from her writers' retreat, but Ida moves in with her and Diego after breaking up with Poppy. Meanwhile, Aiden gets a job at Finley's coffee shop, and the two hit it off, however Aiden restarts selling his A.D.D. meds to soccer moms who pressure him to start selling to them, and gets arrested as a result. The family decides he needs to learn by spending a night in jail, so Stella sells her moped and some of her possessions to bail him out after he explains to her how he began taking meds when rendered numb while worrying about her cancer. Wes ultimately bails him out, to support Stella, only to hear her telling Dr. Grant that she connects with him unlike anything she has with Wes. She tries to explain to Wes, but only makes it worse, causing Wes to tell her that he needs some time alone. Ida decides to give Elizabeth and Diego some space.
7	"Our Father the Hero"	Viet Nguyen	Tad Safran	May 4, 2018	T13.20957	0.37
As Peter pushes Aiden down a risky path by wanting him to spend jail time for his drug dealing, hoping to make him grow up while at the same time, Stella considers her loyalties to her father and brother. Meanwhile, Elizabeth and Diego face a parental predicament.
8	"Sleepless Near Seattle"	Ellen S. Pressman	Zach Dodes	May 11, 2018	T13.20958	0.37
Stella vows to keep things professional between her and Dr. Grant as they accompany Sadie on a road trip to Seattle to try to get her enrolled in a research program, but they find their attraction to each other more difficult than they realize. Meanwhile, Elizabeth and Diego learn that their son is being bullied at school, but when the parents of the bully side with their child, both Elizabeth and Diego take out their frustrations on the bully's parents. Aiden makes a new friend, a young woman named Kayla, at a construction site where he is doing community service.
9	"What to Expect When You're Not Expecting"	John T. Kretchmer	Louisa Levy	May 18, 2018	T13.20959	0.45
Wes returns from his business trip to San Francisco with big news for Stella about a job offer which means that they might have to move there. Meanwhile, Aiden struggles with unfamiliar feelings over his growing relationship with Kayla, while Stella drops a premature bombshell that she might be pregnant. Peter meets Gina, Diego's new boss who is in town visiting on business, while Ida also has eyes for Gina as well.
10	"The Way We Work"	Janice Cooke	Laura Putney & Margaret Easley	May 25, 2018	T13.20960	0.36
Stella and Wes seek out professional relationship help to try to repair their crumbling marriage. Meanwhile, Aiden gets some feedback on his new business plan to open his own bar. Also, Peter tries to focus on his future romance with Gina.
11	"Frisky Business"	Tessa Blake	Nelson Soler & Erin Cardillo & Richard Keith	June 1, 2018	T13.20961	0.46
Feeling confident after another marriage coaching session, Stella receives a big opportunity. Meanwhile, tensions brew at Aiden and Wes' bar as a new investor steps in.
12	"Love Factually"	Michael Grossman	Oliver Goldstick	June 8, 2018	T13.20962	0.38
Stella and Wes try to clear the air between them, but their continuing life problems get in the way. A crisis brings the entire Abbott family together when Peter is hospitalized from a heart attack.
13	"Then and Now"	John T. Kretchmer	Erin Cardillo & Richard Keith	June 15, 2018	T13.20963	0.37
Stella learns that she posted an online video months earlier about Wes that sparks confusion about their future. Meanwhile, Peter decides to follow his heart while recovering from his near-fatal heart attack while under Ida's care. Sadie prepares to leave with her guardian for Seattle to enroll in another research program and says goodbye to Stella. Also, Aiden looks for a business solution for his bar.

== Production ==
The series was created by Erin Cardillo and Richard Keith for The CW as a midseason entry during the 2017–18 television season. They are also executive producers on the series along with Oliver Goldstick, Bill Lawrence, Jeff Ingold, and director Lee Toland Krieger. The show is produced by In Good Company, Doozer Productions, CBS Television Studios and Warner Bros. Television and filmed in Vancouver, British Columbia, Canada. The series is set in the fictional town of Asheville, Oregon.

The CW officially ordered Life Sentence to series on May 10, 2017. In January 2018, the network announced the premiere date of Life Sentence on March 7, 2018.

On March 30, 2018, The CW announced that Life Sentence would move to Fridays at 9:00 pm, which began with the sixth episode.

=== Casting ===
In late January 2017, Lucy Hale was cast as Stella Abbott, followed in February by the casting of Jayson Blair as her older brother, Aiden, and Dylan Walsh as her father, Peter. On February 24, 2017, Gillian Vigman and Brooke Lyons were cast as Ida and Elizabeth, Abbott's mother and sister, respectively. During March 2017, it was announced that Elliot Knight and Carlos PenaVega had joined the cast as Wes, Abbott's husband, and Diego, her brother-in-law, respectively. During September 2017, Riley Smith was cast in the recurring role of Dr. Will Grant, a rough-around-the-edges oncologist with a secret soft spot for his patients.

=== Filming ===
Production on the pilot took place from March 15 to March 31, 2017, in Atlanta, Georgia. Filming moved to Vancouver, British Columbia after being picked up to series. Production began on August 9, 2017, and concluded on January 12, 2018.

== Reception ==
=== Critical response ===
On review aggregator website Rotten Tomatoes, the series holds an approval rating of 37% based on 19 reviews, and an average rating of 4.47/10. Its critical consensus reads, "Life Sentence avoids asking tough questions about serious issues, settling instead for a cloying sweetness." On Metacritic, which assigns normalized rating to reviews, the series has a weighted average score of 49 out of 100, based on 12 critics, indicating "mixed or average reviews".

=== Ratings ===
Viewership and ratings per episode of Life Sentence
No.	Title	Air date	Rating/share (18–49)	Viewers (millions)	DVR (18–49)	DVR viewers (millions)	Total (18–49)	Total viewers (millions)
1	"Pilot"	March 7, 2018	0.2/1	0.67	0.2	0.51	0.4	1.19
2	"Re-Inventing the Abbotts"	March 14, 2018	0.2/1	0.56	—N/a	0.35	—N/a	0.91
3	"Clinical Trial and Error"	March 21, 2018	0.2/1	0.49	—N/a	0.31	—N/a	0.79
4	"How Stella Got Her Groove On"	March 28, 2018	0.1/1	0.40	0.1	0.26	0.2	0.66
5	"Wes Side Story"	April 4, 2018	0.1/1	0.44	0.2	0.25	0.3	0.69
6	"Who Framed Stella Abbott?"	April 27, 2018	0.1/1	0.42	0.1	0.27	0.2	0.69
7	"Our Father the Hero"	May 4, 2018	0.1/1	0.37	—N/a	—N/a	—N/a	—N/a
8	"Sleepless Near Seattle"	May 11, 2018	0.1/1	0.37	0.1	—N/a	0.2	—N/a
9	"What to Expect When You're Not Expecting"	May 18, 2018	0.1/1	0.45	—N/a	—N/a	—N/a	—N/a
10	"The Way We Work"	May 25, 2018	0.1/1	0.36	0.1	0.18	0.2	0.54
11	"Frisky Business"	June 1, 2018	0.1/1	0.46	—N/a	—N/a	—N/a	—N/a
12	"Love Factually"	June 8, 2018	0.1/1	0.38	0.1	0.18	0.2	0.56
13	"Then and Now"	June 15, 2018	0.1/1	0.37	0.1	0.18	0.2	0.57
