= Marcy Avila =

Venezuelan musician, actress, LGBTQ+ rights activist

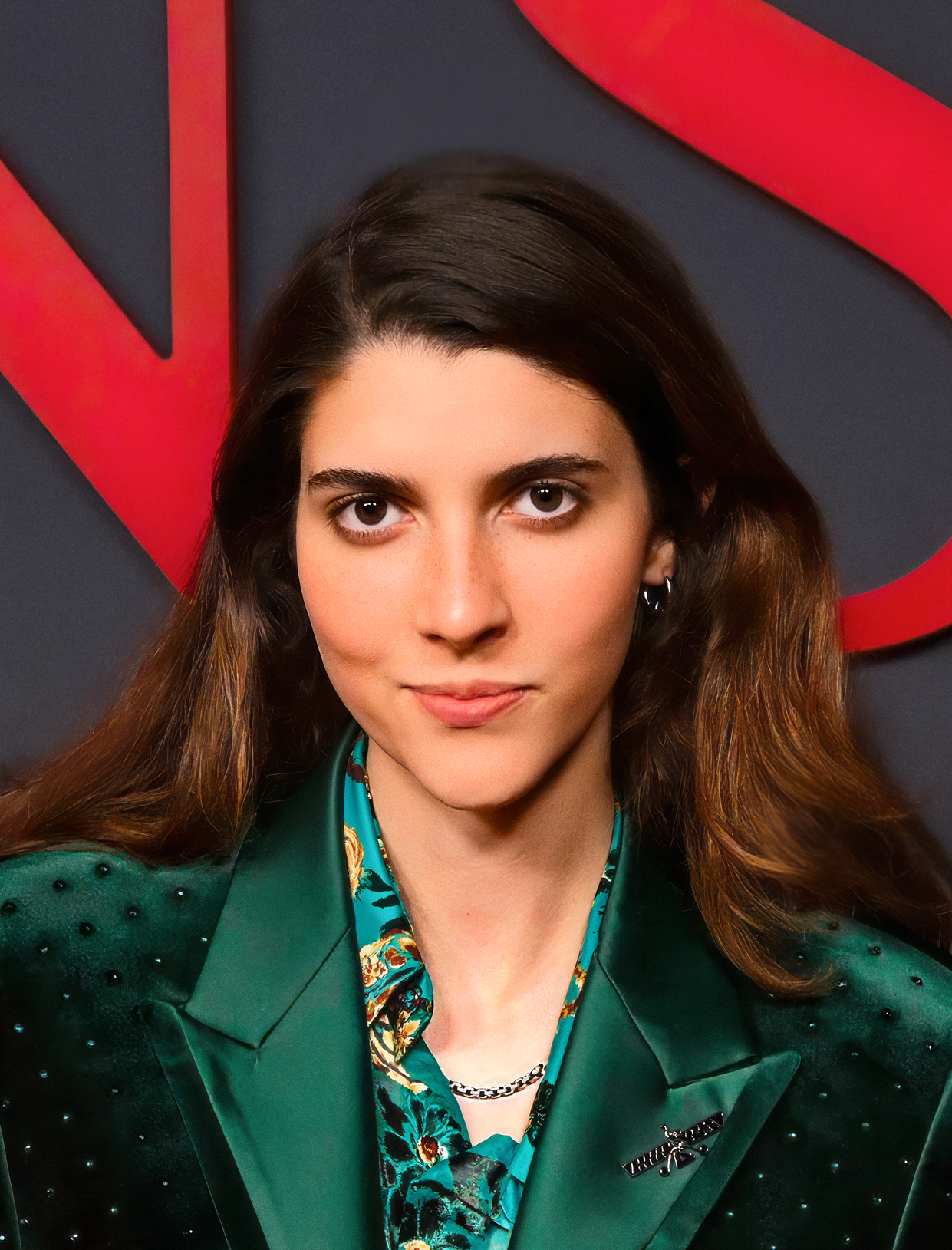
- Marcy Avila at the Weapons world premiere
- Born: February 5, 1997 (age 29); Caracas, Venezuela
- Other name: Marcel Avila
- Occupations: Musician; influencer; actor; songwriter; producer
- Height: 6 ft 0 in (183 cm)
- Musical career
- Genres: Pop, Alternative rock, Indie rock, alt-pop, grunge, pop rock
- Instruments: Vocals, guitar, bass, keyboards
- Years active: 2014 - present
- Marcy Avila at IMDb
- Website: www.marcyavila.com

Marcy Avila (Spanish: [ˈa.β̞i.la]; Caracas, Venezuela; February 5, 1997) is a Venezuelan multi-instrumentalist musician, producer, actress, influencer, and LGBTQ+ rights advocate based in Los Angeles, California. She is known for her avid electric guitar playing, her exceptional talent on the guitar led her to an endorsement deal with Fender, and to perform alongside various artists, including Mothica, Chandler Leighton, and the TikTok star McKenzi Brooke.

Avila is also known for her work as an actress for her role as the antagonist "Martin" on the venezuelan telenovela "Eneamiga", and her role as "Luiggy" on Amazon Prime Video's "Almas en Pena."

== Early life ==
Avila was born in Caracas, Venezuela. From an early age she showed a strong creative drive, as she began performing in local theatre at the age of five, and teaching herself guitar at nine. She studied audiovisual production and music, combining her technical and creative backgrounds before relocating to Los Angeles to expand her career internationally.

== Career ==
=== Music ===
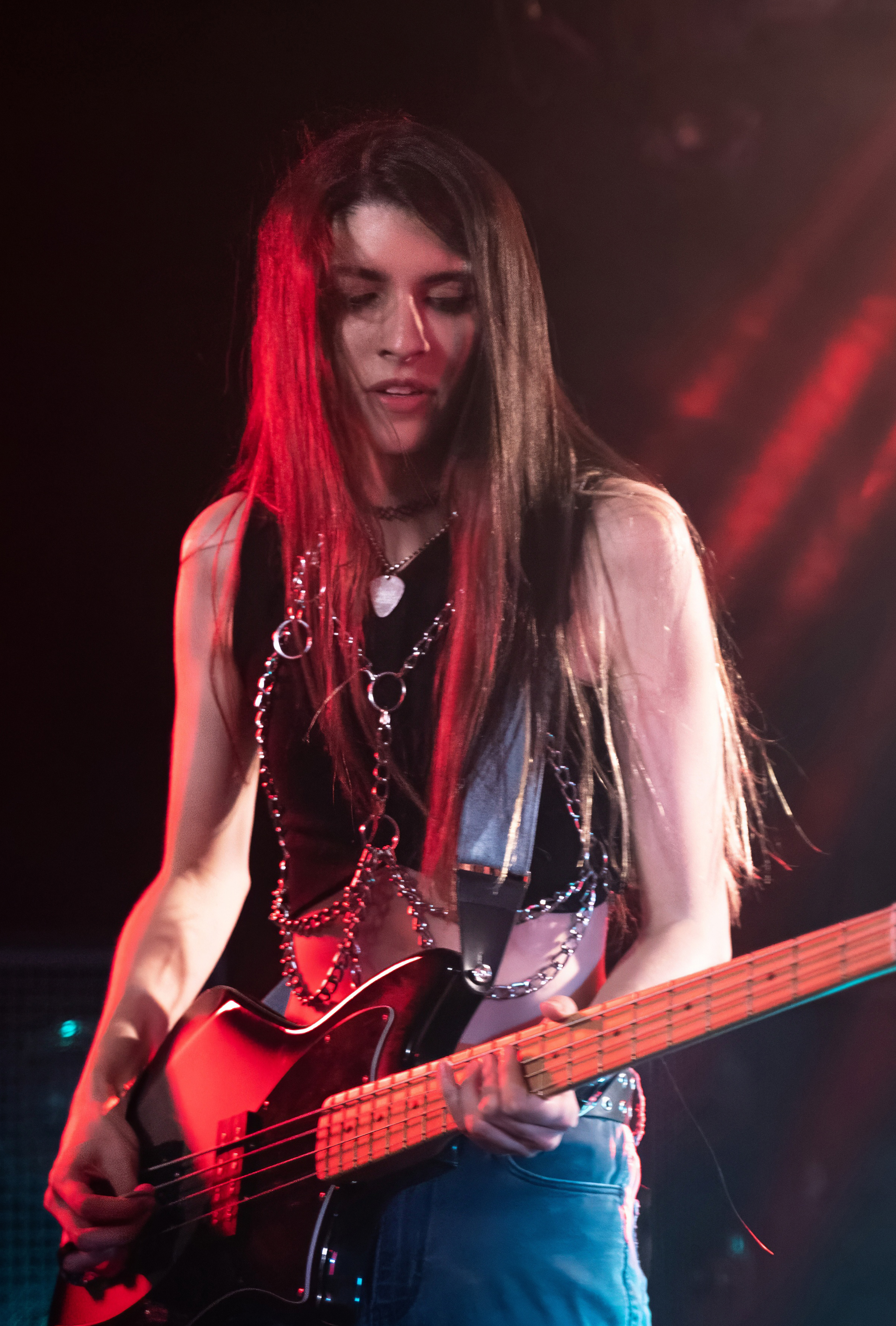
Marcy Avila performing on bass during a Mothica concert

Avila released her debut single, “Superficial,” in 2015 under her birth name, Marcel Avila. The song marked her transition from independent musician to producer and live performer. Since then, she has recorded guitars for numerous artists across pop, alt-rock, and indie music, building a reputation for her expressive tone and stage presence.

Avila has collaborated with American artists Mothica, Chandler Leighton, Sophie Powers, and TikTok Star McKenzi Brooke, contributing both live and studio guitar performances. In 2025, Avila featured on the Venezuelan indie rock single “Lael (feat. Marcy Avila)” by Los Delorean.

Her endorsement with Fender followed her appearance in the company’s #MyFirstFender campaign, where she was spotlighted as one of the brand’s emerging guitarists. She continues to perform, compose, and produce music independently while collaborating with North and Latin American artists.

=== Acting ===
Avila began acting at the age of five in local theater productions in Caracas, where she developed an early passion for performance and storytelling. She later transitioned to on-screen roles, earning recognition in Venezuela for portraying the antagonist “Martín” in the RCTV telenovela Eneamiga (2019). She subsequently appeared as “Luiggy” in Almas en Pena, a supernatural drama distributed internationally via Amazon Prime Video.

After relocating to the United States, Avila expanded her screen career with supporting appearances in international productions, including a role in the Netflix series Never Have I Ever (Season 4). In 2025, she appeared in the Lionsgate feature I Wish You All the Best, a coming-of-age drama directed by transgender filmmaker Tommy Dorfman. Avila, who is also transgender, portrayed Sophie’s girlfriend in the film, a story centered on self-discovery and acceptance. Her casting was noted for bringing authentic transgender visibility to a major studio production and for reflecting the film’s commitment to inclusive representation.

Avila’s transition from Venezuelan television to American film and streaming productions reflects her ongoing evolution as a cross-cultural performer. Her performances often explore themes of identity, resilience, and self-expression, aligning with her broader creative and activist work.

=== Emerging global presence ===
After relocating to Los Angeles, Avila began expanding her professional reach beyond Latin America. Her involvement in international productions and cross-cultural collaborations has contributed to her growing visibility within global entertainment. She has been photographed attending film premieres and industry events hosted by major studios, with coverage documented by editorial outlets such as Getty Images. Avila’s multidisciplinary activity across film, music, and public media appearances has positioned her among a new generation of Latin-American artists gaining international recognition.

=== Activism ===
Avila is an advocate for transgender and LGBTQ+ representation, using her platform to raise awareness about inclusion and equality. She has been profiled in outlets such as *El Diario* and *Los Angeles Blade*, where she spoke about gender identity and the challenges facing queer communities in Venezuela and abroad.

== Filmography ==
=== Music videos ===
Year	Artist	Song	Role	Genre	Ref(s)
2024	MOTHICA	"Red"	Self	Alternative rock	
2024	McKenzi Brooke	"F-U"	Self	Pop	
2026	Sophie Powers	"MIA"	Self	Hyperpop	

=== Television ===
Year	Title	Role	Network	Notes	Ref(s)
2019	Eneamiga	Martín	RCTV	Main antagonist	
2020	Almas en pena	Luiggy	RCTV	Distributed by Amazon Prime Video	
2023	Never Have I Ever (Season 4)	Hotpocket	Netflix		
2024	Date My Abuelita, First!	Self - Main dater	iHeart Radio	Talk show	

=== Film ===
Year	Title	Role	Production	Notes	Ref(s)
2025	I Wish You All the Best	Sophie's girlfriend	Lionsgate Films		
2023	Quiz Lady	Stage crasher	Hulu	Cameo	
2022	El año de la persistencia	Self	Veloz Films	Documentary appearance	
