= Ashby Gentry =

American actor

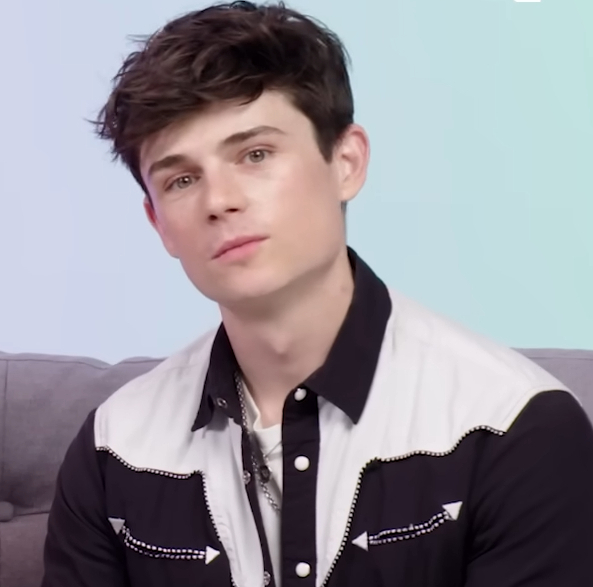
- Born: Ashby Gentry; July 30, 1999 (age 27); Phoenix, Arizona, U.S.
- Occupation: Actor
- Years active: 2022–present
- Known for: My Life with the Walter Boys (role: Alex Walter)

Ashby Gentry is an American actor. He is best known for his role as Alex Walter in the Netflix teen drama series My Life with the Walter Boys.

== Early life and education ==
Ashby Gentry was born and raised in Phoenix, Arizona. He was named after his great-grandfather from his father’s side. Gentry first became interested in acting while in high school in Phoenix, before going on to further his training at university. After high school he attended the Boston University College of Fine Arts (BU CFA), studying in the School of Theater. He graduated in 2021 with a BFA in Performance. He spent part of his youth working in a pizzeria kitchen, where he developed fluency in Spanish, reflecting his multicultural background.

== Career ==
Gentry began his career in 2018 with a role in the short film Speechless, and also appeared in the music video for the song "Silk" by the alternative hip-hop group Belaganas.

In 2022, he portrayed the character Porter in the reboot of the television series Are You Afraid of the Dark?. He gained wider recognition the following year for his role as Alex Walter in the Netflix series My Life with the Walter Boys, which premiered in 2023.

In 2025, Gentry starred in the Mooch directed by Jeff Ryan playing the role of a Joey alongside Louis Cancelmi and Molly Brown. He also joined the cast of The American Winner, an upcoming horror film directed by Farbod Ardebili and starring alongside Flula Borg and Troy Kotsur.

== Filmography ==
Key
†	Denotes films that have not yet been released

=== Film ===
Year	Title	Role	Notes
2018
2018	Speechless	Trevor	Short film
2026	Mooch	Joey Simisomo	
2027	The American Winner †		Post-production

=== Television ===
Year	Title	Role	Notes
2022	Are You Afraid of the Dark?	Porter	guest star
2023–present	My Life with the Walter Boys	Alex Walter	Main role
