= I Wish You All the Best =

- Theatrical release poster
- Directed by: Tommy Dorfman
- Written by: Tommy Dorfman
- Based on: I Wish You All the Best by Mason Deaver
- Produced by: Matt Kaplan; Tommy Dorfman
- Starring: Corey Fogelmanis; Miles Gutierrez-Riley; Lena Dunham; Alexandra Daddario; Cole Sprouse
- Cinematography: Robby Baumgartner
- Edited by: Sarah Beth Shapiro; Keith Henderson
- Music by: Brad Oberhofer
- Production companies: Ace Entertainment; TeaShop Films
- Distributed by: Lionsgate
- Release dates: March 8, 2024 (South by Southwest); November 7, 2025 (United States)
- Running time: 93 minutes
- Country: United States
- Language: English

I Wish You All the Best is a 2024 American coming-of-age drama film directed, written, and produced by Tommy Dorfman, in her directorial debut. The film stars Corey Fogelmanis, Miles Gutierrez-Riley, Lena Dunham, with Alexandra Daddario, and Cole Sprouse. It follows Ben DeBacker (Fogelmanis), a teenager who after being cast out of the house by their parents, embarks upon a journey of self-discovery. The film is based on the novel by Mason Deaver by the same name.

The film had its world premiere at the South by Southwest on March 8, 2024, and was released in the United States on November 7, 2025, by Lionsgate.

== Cast ==
- Corey Fogelmanis as Ben DeBacker, a non-binary teenager
- Miles Gutierrez-Riley as Nathan, a funny and charismatic student
- Alexandra Daddario as Hannah Wallace, Ben's older sister
- Cole Sprouse as Thomas Wallace, Hannah's husband, and a teacher at Ben's new school
- Lena Dunham as Ms. Lyons, Ben's eccentric art teacher
- Amy Landecker as Brenda DeBacker, Ben's mother
- Lexi Underwood as Meleika
- Lisa Yamada as Sophie
- Judson Mills as Mr. DeBacker, Ben's father
- Brian Michael Smith as Chris
- Marcy Avila as Sophie's girlfriend
- Bex Taylor-Klaus as Shayna

== Production ==
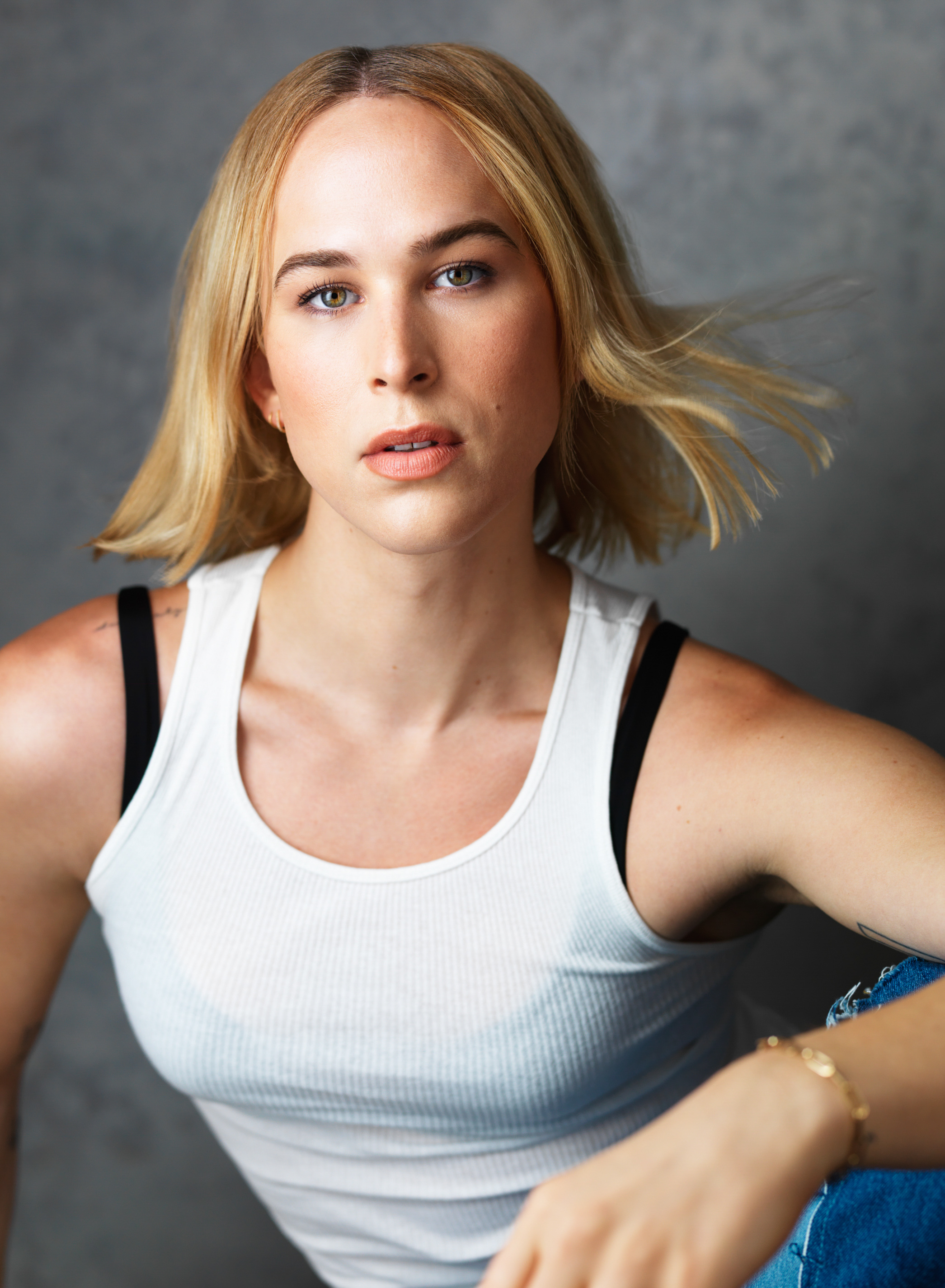
I Wish You All The Best is Tommy Dorfman's directorial debut.

In 2021, Tommy Dorfman revealed on Time that she would be writing, directing, and producing a film adaptation of I Wish You All the Best. On August 30, 2022, Dorfman announced that she was looking for an actor to portray the film's protagonist, Ben DeBacker. On October 14, Alexandra Daddario was set to star as Hannah. On November 4, Corey Fogelmanis was set to star in the film, along with Amy Landecker, Judson Mills, Lexi Underwood, and Lisa Yamada.

== Music ==
On January 10, 2024, Brad Oberhofer was reported to be composing the score for the film.

== Release ==
I Wish You All the Best had its world premiere at the South by Southwest on March 8, 2024. The film was released in the United States on November 7, 2025, by Lionsgate. The film was available for streaming on Starz on March 7, 2026.

== Reception ==
On the review aggregator website Rotten Tomatoes, 86% of 21 critics' reviews are positive. Metacritic, which uses a weighted average, assigned the film a score of 73 out of 100, based on 7 critics, indicating "generally favorable" reviews.
