= Eneamiga =

Venezuelan telenovela

- Genre: Drama
- Created by: Karin Valecillos
- Written by: Karin Valecillos; Fernando Azpurua; Patricia Ramírez
- Directed by: Juan Luis Fermín; Arturo Páez; Samuel Hurtado
- Creative director: Javier Vidal
- Starring: Diana Díaz; Leonardo Aldana; Charyl Chacón; Damián Genovese
- Opening theme: "Dime" by John Grados
- Country of origin: Venezuela
- Original language: Spanish

Production
- Executive producers: Hernando Faria; Antonio Crimaldi; José Simón Escalona
- Producer: Yraima Roa
- Production company: RCTV Producciones

Original release
- Network: IVC Network
- Release: 11 February 2019 – 2019

Eneamiga (stylized onscreen as #Eneamiga) is a Venezuelan drama television series created by Karin Valecillos, and produced by RCTV Producciones or RCTV International. The series is directed by Juan Luis Fermín, Javier Vidal as creative director, and José Simón Escalona as executive producer. It premiered on 11 February 2019 in Latin America on IVC Networks, and it stars Diana Díaz, Leonardo Aldana, Charyl Chacón, and Damián Genovese.

Televen begain airing the series on January 12, 2021

== Cast ==
The cast and characters were obtained from the opening theme of the series.

- Diana Díaz as Paula Sánchez Mejía
  - Naomi de Oliveira as Young Paula
- Leonardo Aldana as Diego Hernández
  - Jhonny Rodríguez as Young Diego
- Charyl Chacón as María Alejandra Salcedo
  - Katherine Gómez as Young María Alejandra
- Damián Genovese as Guillermo Castillo
  - Carlos Piñango as Young Guillermo
- Raquel Yánez as Lucía Dávila
- Claudio de la Torre as Gianluca Brandini
- Andreina Chataing Mazzeo as Victoria Tellis
- Patricia Oliveros as Claudia Díaz
- Rolando Padilla as Domingo Sánchez
- Jorge Roig as Humberto Delgado
- Daniel Vásquez as Saúl Hernández
- María Antonieta Hidalgo as Gabriela Machado
- Theylor Plaza as Yostin
- Claudia Rojas as Yessika Vivas
- Raoul Gutiérrez as Arturo González
- Marcy Avila as Martín
- Michael Roa as Leonardo
- María Alejandra Machado as Sol
- Jhonny Jabbour as Fernando Silva
- Melany Mille as Layla Fitness
- Sofía Molina as Lisa Castillo Dávila
