= Conejo Players Theatre =

Performing arts theater in California, US

Coordinates: 34°10′23″N 118°52′43″W

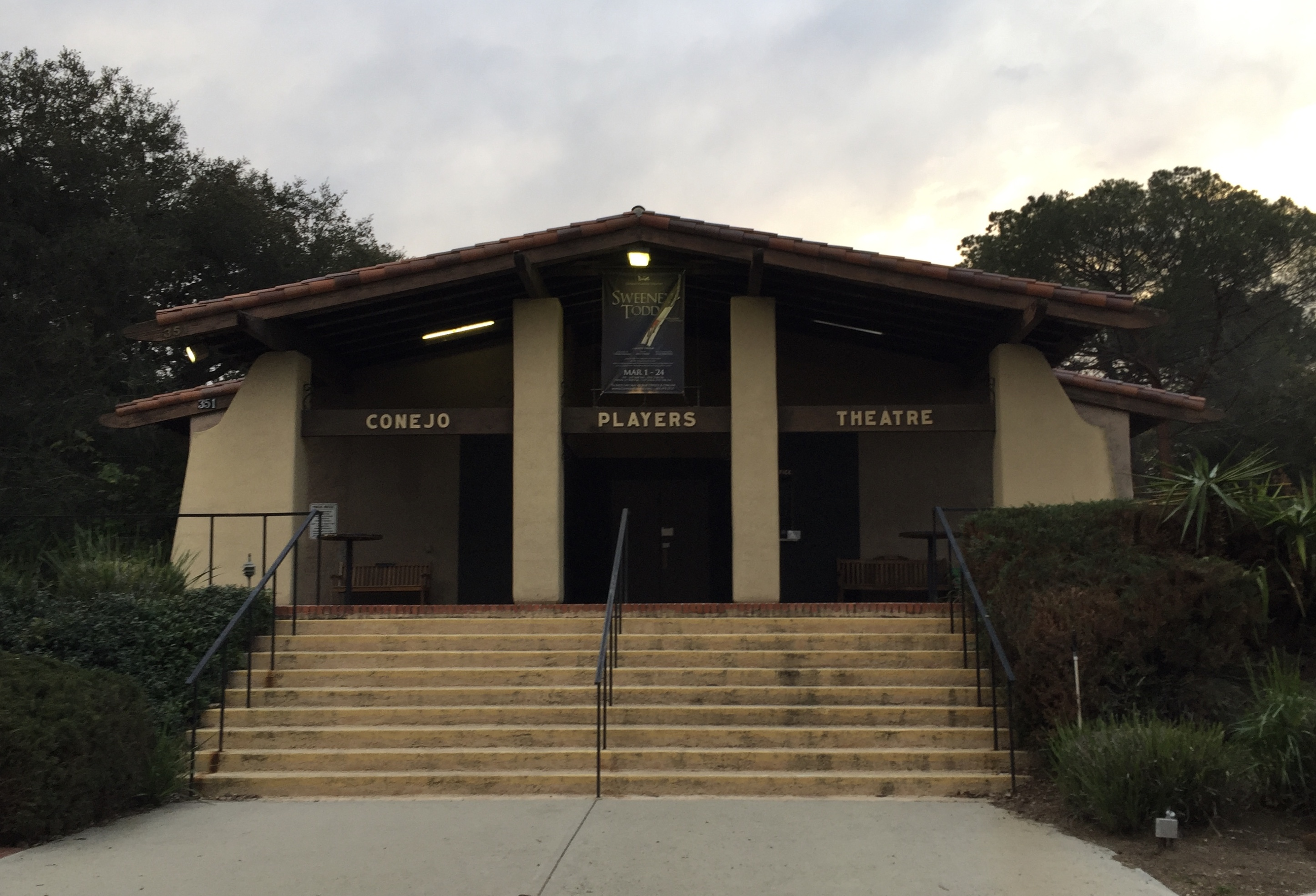
Conejo Players Theatre

Conejo Players Theatre is a performing arts theater in Thousand Oaks, California. Established in 1958, it is the oldest theater in the city — as well as one of the oldest in Southern California. It hosts a full season of Mainstage shows each year, including musicals and plays — plus special events, workshops, improv comedy performances, holiday shows, and a long-running children's theatre program taught by theater professionals. The theater was housed in an old barn building for several years, but constructed a new theater after donations from Janss Corporation in 1963. The 185-seat theater is located on S. Moorpark Road.

Marilyn O'Connor performed regularly at the theater. She has later been seen in TV series such as Matlock, 7th Heaven, Frasier, ER, Little Britain USA and American Horror Story. As a child, Kurt Russell participated in several productions at the Players — as did former Nickelodeon star Amanda Bynes and former Disney Channel star Corey Fogelmanis.

Conejo Players Theatre is allegedly haunted.
