= Ali Novak =

American young adult author

Ali Novak is an American young adult fiction author. She is known for her novel My Life with the Walter Boys, which was adapted into a television series of the same name, as well as her Heartbreak Chronicles trilogy, which includes The Heartbreakers (2015), Paper Hearts (2017), and Heartstrings (2025).

Novak grew up in Wisconsin. She started her writing career posting on Wattpad, where My Life with the Walter Boys received 22 million reads. Working with Wattpad, Sourcebooks published the novel in 2012. In 2014, My Life with the Walter Boys was nominated for the Goodreads Choice Award for Young Adult Fiction. The following year, the Young Adult Library Services Association (YALSA) included it on their "Teens' Top 10" list. In 2018, the second book in the Heartbreak Chronicles, Paper Hearts, was included on the same list.

== Publications ==
=== Heartbreak Chronicles series ===
- The Heartbreakers. Sourcebooks, Inc. 2015. ISBN 978-1-4926-1256-8.
- Paper Hearts. Naperville: Sourcebooks, Inc. 2017. ISBN 978-1-4926-5336-3.
- Heartstrings. Naperville: Sourcebooks, Inc. 2025. ISBN 978-1-4926-5244-1.

=== My Life with the Walter Boys series ===
- My Life with the Walter Boys. Sourcebooks, Inc. 2012. ISBN 978-1-4022-9786-1.
- My Return to the Walter Boys. Sourcebooks, Inc. 2025. ISBN 978-1-4642-3022-6.
