= My Life with the Walter Boys =

2023 American television series

- Genre: Teen drama
- Based on: My Life with the Walter Boys by Ali Novak
- Developed by: Melanie Halsall
- Showrunner: Melanie Halsall
- Starring: Nikki Rodriguez; Noah LaLonde; Ashby Gentry; Johnny Link; Corey Fogelmanis; Connor Stanhope; Zoë Soul; Jaylan Evans; Sarah Rafferty; Marc Blucas
- Music by: Brian H. Kim
- Country of origin: United States
- Original language: English
- No. of seasons: 3
- No. of episodes: 30

Production
- Executive producers: Edward Glauser; Melanie Halsall; Becky Hartman-Edwards; Ed Glauser
- Producers: Keith Raskin; Ian Hay; Chad Oakes; Michael Frislev; Linda Rogers-Ambury
- Production locations: Alberta, Canada
- Cinematography: Walt Lloyd; Jarrett Craig; Derick Underschultz
- Editors: Bridget Durnford; Jamie Alain; Daria Ellerman; Emma Collins; Michelle Heaney; Jonathan Lucas; Erline O'Donovan-Clarke
- Running time: 39–56 minutes
- Production companies: Nomadic Pictures; iGeneration Studios; Sony Pictures Television International Production

Original release
- Network: Netflix
- Release: December 7, 2023 – present

My Life with the Walter Boys is an American teen drama television series developed by Melanie Halsall which premiered on Netflix on December 7, 2023. It is an adaptation of Ali Novak's 2014 novel of the same name, which was first published on Wattpad, and stars Nikki Rodriguez, Noah LaLonde, and Ashby Gentry.

The series follows recently orphaned Jackie Howard, who relocates from Manhattan to rural Colorado after being taken in by her late mother's best friend's family, the Walters.

In May 2026, ahead of the third season premiere, the series was renewed for a fourth season which is set to premiere in 2027.

== Cast and characters ==
=== Main ===
- Nikki Rodriguez as Jackie Howard, a 15-year-old girl who moves to Silver Falls, Colorado, after losing her family in a car crash in New York City. She struggles to adjust to her new environment as she tries to make new friends and heal from her pain
- Noah LaLonde as Cole Walter, Danny's fraternal twin who used to be quarterback at Silver Falls High School but suffered from a career-ending injury
- Ashby Gentry as Alex Walter, a bookish nerd who later becomes involved with rodeo
- Johnny Link as Will Walter (seasons 1–2; guest season 3), a college graduate and engaged to be married to Hayley. He is focused on becoming a businessman and entrepreneur, bringing strain to his relationship with Hayley
- Corey Fogelmanis as Nathan Walter (seasons 1–2; recurring season 3), an openly gay boy who later gets diagnosed with epilepsy
- Connor Stanhope as Danny Walter, Cole's fraternal twin who wants a career in acting
- Zoë Soul as Hayley Young (season 1; guest seasons 2–present), Will's fiancée later wife
- Jaylan Evans as Skylar Summerhill, a teen who is determined to become the valedictorian who becomes friends with Jackie and Nathan’s love interest
- Sarah Rafferty as Katherine Walter, a veterinarian, George's wife and Jackie's legal guardian. She was best friends with Jackie's mom and tries to help Jackie with her transition
- Marc Blucas as George Walter, Katherine's husband and Jackie's legal guardian. He struggles with financial issues concerning their family land.

=== Recurring ===
- Alex Quijano as Richard, Jackie's maternal uncle
- Isaac Arellanes as Isaac Garcia, Lee's brother and a Walter siblings' cousin who lives with the Walters
- Myles Perez as Lee Garcia, Isaac's brother and a Walter siblings' cousin who lives with the Walters
- Ashley Holliday as Tara Jacobs, a guidance counselor at Silver Falls High School
- Naveen Paddock as Eliot (season 3), Richard's new intern
- Erin Karpluk as Hannah Walter (season 3), George's sister and Isaac and Lee's mother

=== Co-starring ===
- Dean Petriw as Jordan Walter, the third youngest Walter sibling and second youngest brother
- Lennix James as Benny Walter, the youngest Walter brother
- Alix West Lefler as Parker Walter, the only daughter of Katherine and George and the second youngest Walter sibling
- Alisha Newton as Erin Collins, Cole's ex-girlfriend and later Danny's girlfriend
- Madison Brydges as Paige Montgomery, Alex's ex-girlfriend who cheated on him with an unaware Cole
- Ellie O'Brien as Grace Wagner, Jackie's friend
- Gabrielle Jacinto as Olivia, Erin's best friend and fellow cheerleader
- Mya Lowe as Kiley Zhou, Alex's best friend since kindergarten who works at Monty's pizza
- Kolton Stewart as Dylan Newsome, Cole's friend and fellow football player
- Jesse Lipscombe as Coach Allen (season 1-2), the Silver Falls High School's football team's head coach and driver's education teacher
- Moheb Jindran as Nikhil Choudry, an English and Drama teacher at Silver Falls High School
- Kayla Heller as Ruby, Erin's friend who tutors Cole
- Joel Oulette as Jay Abrahams
- Nathaniel Arcand as Mato Summerhill (season 1-2), Skylar's father who owns Monty's and the Lark Café
- Chantal Perron as Sandy Collins, Erin's mother
- Riele Downs as Maria (season 2), a student at Silver Fall's High School
- Natalie Sharp as Blake Hartford (seasons 2–present), Alex's rodeo trainer
- Carson MacCormac as Zach (season 2), the yearbook's photographer who gets into a love triangle with Skylar and Nathan
- Janet Kidder as Joanne Wagner (seasons 2–present), Grace's mother and Katherine's friend
- Jake Manley as Wylder Holt (seasons 2–present), a champion Bronc rider who competes against Alex
- Ron Barrington Robinson as Gordon Newsome (seasons 2–present), Dylan's father
- Chad Rook as Mac (season 3), a drag racer
- Jedidiah Goodacre as Danvers Stacey (season 3), a drag racer

== Episodes ==
=== Series overview ===
Season	Episodes	Originally released
1	10	December 7, 2023
2	10	August 28, 2025
3	10	August 6, 2026

=== Season 1 (2023) ===
No. overall	No. in season	Title	Directed by	Written by	Original release date
1	1	"Welcome to Colorado"	Jerry Ciccoritti	Melanie Halsall	December 7, 2023
Six months after the deaths of her parents and older sister in a car accident, Jackie Howard leaves New York City to move in with her late mother's best friend, Katherine Walter, and her family on a ranch in Colorado. The eldest son, Will, introduces Jackie to his two cousins and seven siblings, including Alex and Cole, who immediately take an interest in her. On her first day at Silver Falls High, Jackie struggles to adjust to the small-town school but is supported by Alex, who stands up for her in class. Cole's efforts to welcome Jackie in the cafeteria are met with jealousy from both Alex and Erin, who later confronts Jackie outside school. Jackie befriends Skylar and Grace, who take her out for ice cream.
2	2	"Live a Little"	Jerry Ciccoritti	Melanie Halsall	December 7, 2023
Jackie is pranked by the Walter kids into bleaching her hair. At school, she joins the Student Council and faces opposition from Erin, although Olivia supports her after Jackie sees her leaving Cole's bedroom. Meanwhile, Cole asks Tony, the local mechanic, if he can work full-time. After Jackie tells Katherine about the prank, Cole takes her to a nearby waterfall, where he opens up to her. With the Walter kids upset at Jackie, Alex takes the opportunity to stand up for her and show her his loft. As Cole watches Jackie and Alex together, Isaac realizes that Cole has feelings for Jackie.
3	3	"The Cole Effect"	Nimisha Mukerji	Jordan Ross Schindler	December 7, 2023
Jackie and Alex run the Walter family cider cart at the Homecoming football game. After withdrawing from the town's festivities all week, Cole shows up to the game and fixes the cart, irritating Alex. With Erin criticizing Jackie for her silent auction proposal, Cole goes on stage to successfully promote the auction. Cole fails to show up the next morning to break down the cart, leading Alex to help instead. Parker is upset with Cole for not showing up to her pee-wee football game. Nathan and Skylar have a friendly encounter at the Walter home, while teachers Tara and Nikhil take their interest outside the school.
4	4	"Nineteen"	Nimisha Mukerji	Jonathon Roessler	December 7, 2023
On what would have been her late older sister Lucy's nineteenth birthday, Jackie brings out Lucy's favourite teapot, which is accidentally broken by Parker. Feeling further upset after overhearing Paige and Ruby talk negatively about her, Jackie decides to skip school and attend Dylan's lakehouse party with Cole. There, Cole is dejected after seeing Dylan, the school's new quarterback, take over his former number, 19. In a risqué version of truth-or-dare, Cole turns to kiss an intoxicated Jackie before she vomits on him. Back at home, Jackie tries to kiss Alex but he refuses as he does not want her to potentially regret it once sober. The next day, the Walter family attends Will and Hayley's Lark after Dark event, while Cole and Jackie, grounded after the party, bond by the fireplace.
5	5	"Thanksgiving"	Jerry Ciccoritti	Tawnya Bhattacharya & Ali Laventhol	December 7, 2023
Wanting to avoid her first Thanksgiving since her family's passing, Jackie decides to deliver unclaimed bags from a food drive with Erin. The two grow closer after Jackie tells Erin that she deserves more than Cole's noncommittal attitude, and Erin opens up about her father's death. In turn, Jackie invites Erin to spend Thanksgiving with the Walters. Katherine also invites Jackie's uncle Richard, who unexpectedly reveals plans to seek custody of Jackie. However, with encouragement from Katherine and Erin, Jackie decides to remain with the Walters. Alex takes Jackie to see his version of "Manhattanhenge." Meanwhile, Cole repairs Lucy's teapot and plans to give it to Jackie, only to see Alex and Jackie kiss from afar. After experiencing technical difficulties, Lee and Isaac speak remotely with their father, who is serving in the army. Elsewhere, Hayley learns that Will lied about Mato wanting to keep the Lark open on Thanksgiving after Mato reveals that the idea was Will's.
6	6	"Baggage"	Jerry Ciccoritti	Jesikah Suggs	December 7, 2023
Jackie and Alex are officially a couple, but Alex's public acts of affection start to get on Cole's nerves. Grace tells Jackie about Alex and Cole's previous tensions about Paige. At the bonfire, Alex exposes Cole's dalliance with Olivia, upsetting Erin; Alex punches Cole. Kiley confronts Alex for not spending any time with her and being obsessed with Jackie. George confides in Mato about the family's financial troubles; Mato proposes selling the land to a developer. Hayley and Will break up after another argument about work, with Will moving back in to the Walter home. Nathan tells Skylar about his feelings for him; Skylar listens to the song Nathan wrote for him.
7	7	"Small Town Rumors"	Winnifred Jong	Kelsey Barry	December 7, 2023
The morning after the bonfire, Katherine discovers that Alex and Jackie have been dating since Thanksgiving, and that Cole's jealousy of their relationship led to the brothers' fight. Katherine confronts Cole, while George questions Alex, who implies that Cole has been bringing girls into the house. Alex abruptly admits to Jackie that he had been in love with Paige, upsetting Jackie. A rumour spreads that Alex cried after seeing Cole and Paige together the previous summer, while another rumour spreads that Paige was one of the girls who slept over at Cole's house. Cole confronts Alex in the auditorium for telling George that Cole had been bringing girls into the house, leading to another fight between the brothers. Alex and Cole are suspended for three days, while the other Walter boys are suspended until the following day. At home, Nathan suffers a seizure and is taken to the hospital, where he is diagnosed with epilepsy. Alex apologises to Jackie for not telling her about Paige, and the two reconcile. Erin defies her mother by auditioning for the school play and wins the role of Beatrice, while Isaac secretly auditions and wins the role of Benedick, angering Danny. Cole confronts Jackie about her feelings for him and Alex before revealing that he did not know about Alex and Paige's relationship before the party.
8	8	"Spinning Out"	Winnifred Jong	Teleplay by : Jonathon Roessler & Jordan Ross Schindler; Story by : Grace Condon	December 7, 2023
9	9	"Revolutions"	Jason Priestley	Tawnya Bhattacharya & Ali Laventhol	December 7, 2023
10	10	"Happily Ever After"	Jason Priestley	Melanie Halsall	December 7, 2023

=== Season 2 (2025) ===
No. overall	No. in season	Title	Directed by	Written by	Original release date
11	1	"Start Fresh"	Jason Priestley	Melanie Halsall	August 28, 2025
After spending the summer in New York, Katherine visits Jackie and convinces her to return to Silver Falls. Following training camp in Montana, Alex comes back with a confident yet arrogant attitude. Hayley departs for a three-month trip to Chile as part of her thesis, leaving Will at home to spearhead the ranch development plans. Jackie plans to enrol in driver's education so she can help Katherine and George with the younger Walter kids' activities, but woodshop is the only open elective remaining. On the first day of the school year, Nathan joins the school newspaper, where Skylar serves as an editor, while Alex blows off Kiley in driver's education. At dinner at Monte's, Cole declines Coach Allen's offer to become his assistant football coach. Danny and Erin kiss after texting all summer, while Kiley agrees to swap electives with Jackie. Alex officially breaks up with Jackie in driver's education, while Dylan takes an interest in Kiley during woodshop. Jackie reconciles with Parker after apologising for not saying anything before she left. After Danny tells Cole that Jackie missed him, Cole tries to talk to Jackie about what happened before she left.
12	2	"My Life Without the Walter Boys"	Jason Priestley	Jesikah Suggs	August 28, 2025
Jackie tells Cole that nothing can happen between them because she needs to fit in with the Walters. The football team has an abysmal start to the season, so Cole succumbs to the pressure and becomes assistant coach. The fall formal is canceled due to budget cuts, but Jackie makes it her mission to ensure it goes ahead. The student council decides to raise money for the dance via a pop-up thrift shop at Monty's, but their effort to sell pizza at the pep rally is only successful after Cole tells Dylan and the football team to participate. Danny and Erin keep their relationship a secret because Danny doesn't know how to tell an increasingly suspicious Cole. The yearbook photographer, Zach, flirts with Nathan after finding out they like the same music. Will, George, and Katherine face serious opposition to their plans for limited tourism at the ranch at a community meeting. Will and George have different ideas about how to handle the situation, leading to tension. Alex wants to be a bronc rider, but his parents forbid it because it is dangerous. He does it anyway and hurts his hand, which Jackie witnesses. She covers for Alex's injury with Katherine at their driving lesson. Katherine and George realize that they cannot stop Alex from bronc riding, so they hire an expert trainer to keep him safe. Alex is shocked when he meets his trainer, a slightly older girl named Blake. Jackie, appreciative of Cole's actions at the pep rally, proposes that they try being friends.
13	3	"Girls Just Wanna have Fundraisers"	Audrey Cummings	Jordan Ross Schindler	August 28, 2025
Cole and Dylan butt heads at football practice. The Walter family's plans for the ranch lead to tension between Katherine and Grace's mom, Joanne, who tells Grace she fears they'll eventually be priced out of Silver Falls. While looking for dresses in Katherine's closet to sell at the pop-up shop, Jackie and Grace discover dresses designed by Jackie's mom. George intervenes at the last minute when a bulldozer almost razes down a shed that was built by Will's great-great grandfather. He is deeply disappointed when Will doesn't seem to appreciate the ranch's rich family history. Dylan flirts with Kylie, who rebuffs his advances. Jackie is torn about selling her mom's dresses, but she ultimately does so. Ruby, who has been flirting with Cole, tears one of the dresses to make a slit, upsetting Jackie. Even though Nathan is dating Skylar, Zach does not stop pursuing him. Blake starts training Alex in bronc riding, and sparks fly between them. George and Will go fly-fishing to bond, but when Uncle Richard shows up at the ranch to scold George about how he handled the opposition at the community meeting, it is revealed that Will called him. Erin saves one of Jackie's mom's dresses from being sold and gives it to Jackie. When Cole and Jackie leave Monty's, they see Danny and Erin making out in Erin's car.
14	4	"No-look Pass"	Audrey Cummings	Liz Maccie	August 28, 2025
Paige confronts Jackie after hearing that Jackie is running against her for class president. Jackie dispells the rumor but is goaded into falsely saying they have a live band for the dance. Alex jumps in front of Jackie when Paige throws a ball at her during dodgeball. Danny and Cole make up, and Cole tells Erin he is genuinely happy for her. Uncle Richard wants to secure permits for the Walters the way he does in New York, but George and Katherine are wary of upsetting their neighbors. They discover, though, that a lot of people, especially Grace's parents (Bob and Joanne), are unwilling to give them the benefit of the doubt. The football team is facing their toughest rivals, so Cole does one-on-one lessons with Dylan to teach him how to throw a no-look pass. While Jackie and Grace are scouting local bands for the fall formal, Jackie sees Alex and Blake dancing together at one of the gigs. After failing to secure a band, Jackie ultimately decides use the excellent playlist Grace put together at the fall formal. Skylar notices that Nathan and Zach are getting closer, so he comes up with an elaborate plan to ask Nathan to the fall formal at the football game. The football team wins the game, but Cole has mixed feelings. When Paige confronts Jackie again about the race for class president, Jackie replies that Paige's behavior has convinced her it is necessary to run for class president.
15	5	"A Night to Remember"	Jason Priestley	Tawnya Bhattacharya & Ali Laventhol	August 28, 2025
At football practice, a scout from Oklahoma State approaches Cole about their coaching program. Nathan and Zach pitch an idea for the school newspaper's music column, but Skylar gives the column to someone else, irritating Nathan. As Cole, Nathan, Danny, and Erin are about to go inside for the fall formal, Dylan and the football team's first string arrive in a limo. Danny takes exception to Cole's exclusion, but Cole brushes it off. Cole and Jackie share a dance, but Jackie pulls away when a slow song plays. Alex takes Blake to the arcade where they share a kiss, but Alex is uncomfortable afterward, which Blake interprets as disinterest. Skylar breaks up with Nathan after witnessing him kiss Zach. Dylan takes sole credit for the no-look pass in front of Cole. Another football player informs Cole of the extent to which Dylan has betrayed him. Cole and Dylan get into a brawl, so the teachers end the fall formal early. Erin is upset with Danny for leaving her on the dance floor to help Cole, but they reconcile after Danny recreates the interrupted dance. Dylan helps Kylie with the nightly clean-up at Monty's. Cole and Ruby almost hook up, but he calls her by Jackie's nickname. When Jackie returns to the ranch, Alex tells her he is unable to move on from her, and she tells him the real reason she left Silver Falls after Will and Hayley's wedding. Before he can respond, lightning hits the barn and starts a fire with the horses inside, so Alex goes in to save them.
16	6	"After the Dance"	Jason Priestley	Melanie Halsall	August 28, 2025
17	7	"Saddle Up"	Monika Mitchell	Jonathon Roessler	August 28, 2025
18	8	"Gear Shifts"	Monika Mitchell	Kelsey Barry	August 28, 2025
19	9	"Allhallowtide"	Jason Priestley	Tawnya Bhattacharya & Ali Laventhol	August 28, 2025
20	10	"Showdowns and Sparkles"	Jason Priestley	Melanie Halsall	August 28, 2025

=== Season 3 (2026) ===
No. overall	No. in season	Title	Directed by	Written by	Original release date
21	1	"Homecoming"	Monika Mitchell	Melanie Halsall	August 6, 2026
22	2	"Split Focus"	Monika Mitchell	Jesikah Suggs	August 6, 2026
23	3	"Fever Pitch"	Felipe Rodriguez	Liz Maccie	August 6, 2026
24	4	"Screeching Tires and True Love"	Felipe Rodriguez	Jordan Ross Schindler	August 6, 2026
25	5	"The Jackie and Cole Effect"	Audrey Cummings	Samantha Humphrey	August 6, 2026
26	6	"Wide Open Spaces"	Audrey Cummings	Kelsey Barry	August 6, 2026
27	7	"Washout"	Shannon Kohli	Melanie Halsall	August 6, 2026
28	8	"Everybody’s Fine"	Shannon Kohli	Teleplay by : Liz Maccie; Story by : Priya A. Desai & Jillian Molin	August 6, 2026
29	9	"Ghosts"	Monika Mitchell	Becky Hartman Edwards	August 6, 2026
30	10	"The Beautiful and the Damned"	Monika Mitchell	Melanie Halsall	August 6, 2026

== Production ==
=== Development ===
In September 2021, it was announced that Sony Pictures Television and iGeneration Studios were producing My Life with the Walter Boys, following iGeneration Studios' acquisition of Komixx Entertainment. Ed Glauser, who was the executive producer for Netflix's The Kissing Booth film series, joined production alongside showrunner and executive producer Melanie Halsall. Filming for the first season began in March 2022 in Alberta, Canada, and concluded by September 2022. Production for the series took place across Alberta, with filming locations in the city of Calgary, the town of Cochrane, and the town of Crossfield. On December 19, 2023, Netflix renewed the series for a second season. Pre-production for second season started on May 27, 2024 and ended on July 19, 2024; filming for the second season began on July 22, 2024 and concluded on November 7, 2024. On November 18, 2024, it was reported that Natalie Sharp, Carson MacCormac, Janet Kidder, Riele Downs, and Jake Manley joined the cast in recurring roles for the second season. Ahead of the second season, premiere, on May 14, 2025, Netflix renewed the series for a third season. Pre-production for the third season started on June 9, 2025, and concluded on August 5, 2025; filming began on August 6, 2025, and ended on December 1, 2025. On July 29, 2025, it was announced that Chad Rook was cast in a recurring capacity for the third season. On December 8, 2025, it was reported that Erin Karpluk and Naveen Paddock joined the cast in recurring roles for the third season. On May 13, 2026, Netflix renewed the series for a fourth season. Filming for the fourth season began on July 27, 2026 and concluded on November 20, 2026.

=== Music ===
My Life with the Walter Boys features an original score by Brian H. Kim, released digitally by Madison Gate Records on December 7, 2023, with the diegetic track "Light Up the Sky (Skylar's Song)" performed by Corey Fogelmanis. Season 1 includes pop and indie placements such as "Hallucinate" by Dua Lipa, "Overdrive" by Maggie Rogers, "The Show" by Niall Horan, "What They'll Say About Us" by Finneas, "Let My Love Open the Door" by Pete Townshend, and "Cornflake Girl" by Tori Amos.

Season 2 continues this approach with tracks including "Birds of a Feather" by Billie Eilish, "Let It Happen" by Gracie Abrams, "In Between Days" by The Cure, "Connection" by Elastica, "The Only Exception" by Paramore, "My Songs Know What You Did in the Dark (Light Em Up)" by Fall Out Boy, and "Fire on Fire" by Sam Smith.

== Release ==
My Life with the Walter Boys first season was released on December 7, 2023. The second season was released on August 28, 2025. The third season was released on August 6, 2026.

== Reception ==
For the first season, the review aggregator website Rotten Tomatoes reported a 45% approval rating based on 11 critic reviews, with an average of rated reviews of 5.5/10. Metacritic, which uses a weighted average, assigned a score of 50 out of 100 based on 6 critics, indicating "mixed or average reviews".

The second season has a 67% approval rating on Rotten Tomatoes, based on 6 critic reviews, with an average of rated reviews of 5.4/10.

The third season holds an 83% approval rating on Rotten Tomatoes, based on 6 critic reviews, with an average of rated reviews of 6/10.
