= School Spirit (Into the Dark) =

- Into the Dark episode
- Episode no.: Season 1 Episode 11
- Directed by: Mike Gan
- Story by: Pat Casey; Josh Miller
- Teleplay by: Pat Casey; Josh Miller; Mike Gan
- Editing by: Andrew Wesman
- Original air date: August 2, 2019
- Running time: 83 minutes

Episode chronology
← Previous "Culture Shock"	Next → "Pure"

"School Spirit" is the eleventh episode of the first season of Hulu's horror anthology streaming television series Into the Dark. The feature-length episode was directed by Mike Gan, who co-wrote the episode's teleplay. It was released on Hulu on August 2, 2019.

The holiday for this episode is the first day of school.

== Synopsis ==
The film opens with the brutal murder of two teenagers who have broken into their high school, Helbrook. It then cuts to a video of Erica Yang, a senior hoping to attend Harvard and the student body president, advising her graduating peers to use their final days to take chances while they still can. She is then shown going to school to attend Saturday detention, something that she hides from her former boyfriend, Jason. Erica also hides the reason she received detention from the other attendees, Lizzy, Russ, Vic, and Brett, despite their interest and disbelief. The school's Vice Principal tasks the students with the cleaning of the library before leaving for his office.

Once he's gone the teens relax and smoke pot, with the exception of Brett, and they discuss the urban legend that the school is haunted by the ghost of a dead teacher who slaughtered misbehaving students. As the day progresses the students are picked off one by one by the same killer seen earlier in the film. Erica's ex Jason is also killed after he snuck into the school to persuade her to resume their relationship. The group's dwindling numbers are initially attributed to the missing teenagers escaping from detention, but they soon realize that something more sinister is at hand.

Eventually only Erica is left alive and she is knocked unconscious by the killer. She awakens to find herself tied up in the school's basement, where she realizes that the killer is Brett. He informs her that he is the son of the dead teacher and that he has been living in the basement since her death. Brett began killing students that misbehaved, as he saw their actions as tarnishing the school's image. He spared Erica because he saw her as a pure, virtuous girl and thought that the detention would be his only way to meet her in person and has been stalking her for three years. Brett was dismayed when it was eventually revealed that she was in detention for cheating, something he was reluctant to see as true. Realizing that he has a creepy crush on her, Erica convinces him to untie her so they can dance together. Once freed, Erica attacks Brett and kills him. As he dies, she reveals that she is far from a pure, virtuous girl as she regularly cheated, had sex, and did drugs - she just hid this to protect her public image. Erica then leaves the school, where she is met by police officers. The film ends with her using the tragedy as a way to promote herself in the media and ensure that she is accepted to Harvard.

== Cast ==
- Annie Q. as Erica Yang
- Corey Fogelmanis as Brett
- Jessi Case as Lizzy
- Julian Works as Vic
- Jordan Austin Smith as Jason
- Philip Labes as Russ
- Hugo Armstrong as Mr. Armstrong
- Graham Taylor as Todd
- Rickey Alexander Wilson as Chester

== Production ==
While filming director Mike Gan "wanted to combine the great slasher films of the '90s like Scream and I Know What You Did Last Summer with the iconic character ensembles of the '80s films like Breakfast Club". Gan wanted to avoid the characters coming across as stereotypical, so all of the characters were written "as if each one was the hero of the movie and I think that really helped because they weren’t one-noted and we really got to see different sides." Actors Corey Fogelmanis and Annie Q. were brought on to portray two of the film's central characters, Erica and Brett, based on a script written by Gan, Pat Casey, and Josh Miller. The character of Erica was written specifically as Asian-American.

Filming took place in three locations, two high schools and a sound stage, and Gan stated that it was a challenge as one of the schools still had students in class and they had to make the film look like it was taking place in one school. The crew shot at a fast pace, filming about 8-9 pages a day.

== Release ==
Hulu released "School Spirit" on August 2, 2019. Episodes of Into the Dark are themed around holidays and other landmark days; the holiday for "School Spirit" is the first day of school.

== Reception ==
As of September 2021 "School Spirit" has a rating of 50% on Rotten Tomatoes, based on 6 reviews. The reviewer for RogerEbert.com noted that the first day of school was a bit of a stretch for the show's holiday theme, also criticizing the episode's dialogue and visuals. Daily Dot and Slash Film both criticized "School Spirit" as formulaic, with Matt Donato of Slash Film summing it up as "not outright bad, nor unwatchable, but "harmless" or "unenthusiastic."" Screen Anarchy was more favorable while also voicing similar criticisms.
