= Carved (2024 film) =

2024 American film

- Official release poster
- Directed by: Justin Harding
- Written by: Justin Harding; Cheryl Meyer
- Produced by: David Brooks; Jenna Cavelle; Deborah Liebling; Arbi Pedrossian
- Starring: Peyton Elizabeth Lee; Corey Fogelmanis; Carla Jimenez; Elvis Nolasco; Jonah Lees; Wyatt Lindner; Sasha Mason; Marc-Sully Saint-Fleur; Jackson Kelly; Matty Cardarople; Ted Ferguson; DJ Qualls; Chris Elliott
- Cinematography: Sevdije Kastrati
- Edited by: Pamela Bayne
- Music by: Michelle Osis; Terry Benn
- Production companies: WorthenBrooks; Inner Child Productions
- Distributed by: Hulu
- Release dates: October 17, 2024 (SHFF); October 21, 2024 (online)
- Running time: 95 minutes
- Country: United States
- Language: English

Carved is a 2024 American horror comedy film directed and written by Justin Harding and starring an ensemble cast including Peyton Elizabeth Lee, Corey Fogelmanis, Carla Jimenez, Elvis Nolasco, Jonah Lees, Wyatt Lindner, Sasha Mason, Marc-Sully Saint-Fleur, Jackson Kelly, Matty Cardarople, Ted Ferguson, DJ Qualls and Chris Elliott. Based on the 2018 short film of the same name, the film follows a group of teenagers on Halloween who become trapped in a historical reenactment village and are stalked by a killer pumpkin.

Carved premiered at the Screamfest Horror Film Festival on October 17, 2024, and was released on Hulu on October 21, 2024.

== Premise ==
In 1993, a teenage playwright, her younger brother, and a group of survivors become trapped in a historical reenactment village on Halloween night; they come together to survive an attack by a vengeful killer pumpkin.

== Cast ==
- Peyton Elizabeth Lee as Kira
- Corey Fogelmanis as Cody
- Carla Jimenez as Barb
- Elvis Nolasco as AJ
- Jonah Lees as Shane
- Wyatt Lindner as Trevor
- Sasha Mason as Maddie
- Marc-Sully Saint-Fleur as Kevin
- Jackson Kelly as Wes
- Matty Cardarople as Clint
- Ted Ferguson as Arthur
- DJ Qualls as Bill
- Chris Elliott as Earl
- Goldy Wolf as Little Girl
- Reed Willard as Jimmy "Koz"

== Production ==
Carved is based on the short film of the same name (2018), which was also written and directed by Justin Harding. The short won Hulu's 2018 Huluween short film contest. In July 2024, it was announced that Peyton Elizabeth Lee would be the lead in the feature-length Carved film, with the rest of the cast also being revealed.

== Release ==
Carved premiered at the Screamfest Horror Film Festival on October 17, 2024. The film was released on Hulu on October 21, 2024.

== Reception ==
JK Sooja of Common Sense Media gave the film a mixed review, stating that it "doesn't have enough substance or depth to justify the making of it," although he praised the acting. John Serba of Decider gave the film a more positive review, calling it "a tasty-enough slice of horror-comedy pie" and praising the film's gore.
