= Deadly Scholars =

- Directed by: Danny J. Boyle
- Written by: Caron Tschampion
- Produced by: Eric Scott Woods; Stan Spry
- Starring: Sheryl Lee; Paris Berelc; Kennedy Lea Slocum; Corey Fogelmanis
- Cinematography: Stephan Tringali
- Edited by: Andrew Henry
- Release date: January 16, 2018
- Running time: 90 min
- Country: United States
- Language: English

Deadly Scholars, also known as #SquadGoals is a 2018 American horror thriller film directed by Danny J. Boyle and starring Sheryl Lee, Paris Berelc, Kennedy Lea Slocum and Corey Fogelmanis.

== Cast ==
- Sheryl Lee as Emily Hodges
- Paris Berelc as Brittany
- Kennedy Lea Slocum as Samantha Hodges
- Corey Fogelmanis as Nate
- Peyton Clark as Rudy
- Alexa Mansour as Gillian
- Sherri Saum as Principal Pope
- Eric Stanton Betts as Lance
- Pedro Correa as Jordan
- Alissa Latow as Angela

== Plot ==
During a school theater performance of Romeo and Juliet, high school student Jordan suddenly collapses and dies. An allergic reaction is suspected as the cause of death. However, Jordan's classmate Samantha, a reporter for the school newspaper SquadGoals, finds his death suspicious. Together with her friend, photography enthusiast Nate, she starts her own investigation. She is particularly suspicious of the principal Ms. Pope, who seems to be hiding something. This particularly displeases Samantha's mother Emily, who works as a school psychologist at the school. Meanwhile, Nate confesses to Samantha that he is in love with her, which she reciprocates. However, she doesn't want to get involved with him until he has spoken to Samantha's best friend Gillian, who is also in love with Nate.

Rudy, another of Samantha's friends, is hosting a party. Here Gillian flirts with Nate, but he rebuffs her and confesses to being in love with Samantha. Meanwhile, Samantha finds cheerleader Brittany crying. Someone had sent her a photo of her boyfriend, basketball star Lance, kissing the now deceased Jordan. Shortly afterwards, Brittany is found dead in the garage driveway after falling out of the window and the police begin to investigate. While Gillian drives Samantha home, she tells her that she would be okay if Samantha and Nate became a couple. Back home, Samantha talks to her mother Emily about Brittany's death. The two speculate whether it could have been a suicide.

In a conversation between Emily and Ms. Pope the following day, it becomes clear that the principal definitely wants the death to be an accident to avoid a scandal. Meanwhile, Samantha increasingly has the feeling that she is being followed and, together with Nate, wants to finally find out who is behind the suspected murders. They question a classmate who is in charge of the school theater in the hope of finding out what could have poisoned Jordan. Samantha suspects that there may have been traces of nuts on Julia actress Angela's lips and steals her lipstick from the theater. Jordan had a severe allergy to nuts. Rudy analyzes it in the school chemistry lab and confirms the suspicion. Later, Rudy visits Emily to talk to her about the experience, which he finds difficult to process. Ms. Pope then tries to get Emily to tell her what the conversation was about, as she continues to try to keep the events under control. But Emily refuses to do so.

After questioning Angela, Samantha does not assume that she herself is behind the tampered lipstick. She now suspects that the motive for the murders lies behind the scholarship that the school awards and that someone is trying to eliminate the competition, but rich Angela didn't need it. After someone distributes the kissing photo of Lance and Jordan around the school, Lance is taken off the list of potential scholarship recipients. Samantha feels confirmed that the scholarship is the reason for the murders, as now only herself, Nate and Rudy are on the list. She talks to her mother about it, but she warns her not to put herself in danger and to focus on her academic performance, especially as she has been accepted to a university. They both decide to give the results of the lipstick test to the police.

Gillian tells Samantha that she saw the photo of Lance and Jordan on Nate's computer, which means he took it and may have been behind the dissemination and the murders, especially since he would have disliked everyone involved. Finally, the autopsy results of Brittany's body show that she didn't die from the fall, but from a stab wound. During a search of Rudy's locker, a knife is found that was probably used to stab her, whereupon Rudy is arrested. Meanwhile, Samantha meets with Gillian to tell her that she suspects Nate. At the meeting, however, Gillian is revealed to be the murderer. She had not gotten over the disappointment that Nate had fallen in love with Samantha instead of her, and while threatening Samantha with a knife, she confesses to the murders while stating that her motive is to win Nate's love and become his girlfriend. However, Samantha reveals that she had lured Gillian into a trap, and Nate comes out of hiding, having recorded the confession. Realizing that her desire to win Nate's love has been ruined, Gillian becomes enraged and tries to kill them both, but in the end, Samantha ultimately manages to kill Gillian by bludgeoning her with a wooden plank, and she and Nate kiss. At the end, we find out that Samantha has won several writing awards for her revelation story and has also been awarded the scholarship.

== Release ==
The film was released online in January 2018 and was later released on Netflix.

== Reviews ==
The film received negative reviews. A review at RogerMoore'sMovieNations gave the film one star out of 4, and concluded: "I’ve seen worse, but then, I see everything." However, Morgan Mittlestadt, of The Central Trend, found in her review that she "could relate to the pressures that are associated with graduating high school and moving onto college that the characters in Deadly Scholars voiced".
