= Significant Mother =

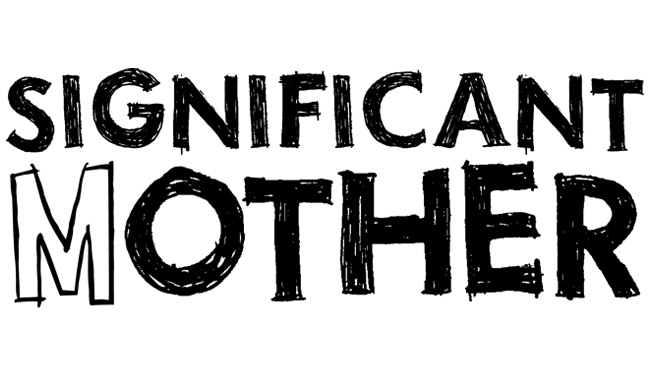
- Genre: Sitcom
- Created by: Erin Cardillo; Richard Keith
- Written by: Erin Cardillo; Richard Keith
- Creative director: Schuyler Telleen
- Starring: Josh Zuckerman; Nathaniel Buzolic; Krista Allen
- Composer: Brian Kim
- Country of origin: United States
- Original language: English
- No. of seasons: 1
- No. of episodes: 9

Production
- Executive producers: Erin Cardillo; Richard Keith; Leslie Morgenstein; Tripp Reed
- Producer: Kevin Sullivan
- Production locations: Portland, Oregon
- Cinematography: Tyson Wisbrock
- Camera setup: Single-camera
- Running time: 21 minutes
- Production companies: Alloy Entertainment; Warner Bros. Television; CBS Television Studios

Original release
- Network: The CW
- Release: August 3 – October 5, 2015

Significant Mother is an American television sitcom created by Erin Cardillo and Richard Keith. Starring Josh Zuckerman, Nathaniel Buzolic and Krista Allen, it premiered on The CW network on August 3, 2015 and ended its run on October 5, 2015.

On February 16, 2016, Zuckerman said on his Twitter account that the series would not return for a second season. On February 18, 2016, Keith confirmed that.

== Plot ==
Restaurateur Nate Marlowe (Zuckerman) is shocked to discover that his best friend and roommate, Jimmy Barnes (Buzolic), has had sex with his mother, Lydia (Allen). Nate and his father Harrison (Jonathan Silverman) find that they must face the reality that Lydia and Jimmy plan to pursue their relationship.

== Cast ==
=== Main ===
- Josh Zuckerman as Nathaniel "Nate" Marlowe
- Nathaniel Buzolic as Jimothy "Jimmy" Barnes, Nate's longtime friend
- Krista Allen as Lydia Marlowe, Nate's mother

=== Guest ===
- Jonathan Silverman as Harrison Marlowe, Nate's father
- Emma Fitzpatrick as Sam Dillinger, Nate's employee at his restaurant
- Jay Ali as Atticus Adams, Sam's boyfriend, an organic farmer
- Denise Richards as Pepper Spinner, a notorious cougar with whom Nate ends up on a date
- Linda Gray as Gammy, Nate's grandmother and Lydia's conservative southern mother.
- Jerry O'Connell as Bob Babcock, a "slick realtor"
- Erin Cardillo as Parker, Lydia's nosy lesbian co-worker
- Mircea Monroe as Annie, a cute girl Nate meets on the dating app "Get Forked" and begins to date

== Episodes ==
No.	Title	Directed by	Written by	Original release date	US viewers (millions)
1	"Welcome to Bonetown"	Tripp Reed & John Putch	Erin Cardillo & Richard Keith	August 3, 2015	0.84
Budding Portland restaurateur Nate's world is turned upside down when he comes back from a business trip to find his lothario best friend and roommate, Jimmy, is having a fling with his recently separated mother, Lydia. To make matters worse, Nate's previously uninterested father, Harrison, is now determined to win Lydia back and isn't afraid to use Nate to get what he wants. Stuck between his family feud and his best friend's first serious relationship, Nate's "new normal" forever changes his relationships with his parents, and severely handicaps his own dating life.
2	"Mixed Doubles"	Tripp Reed	Erin Cardillo & Richard Keith	August 10, 2015	0.73
After Nate suggests they may not be taking their relationship seriously, Lydia and Jimmy decide to prove him wrong by going on a date - in public. Meanwhile, Jimmy calls Nate out for his own lackluster dating style, prompting him to go on a date with notorious cougar Pepper Spinner, whom he meets at the restaurant. Elsewhere, Atticus prepares for his own perfect evening enjoying the equinox with Sam. Finally, things take an uncomfortable turn when Lydia and Jimmy run into Nate on his date with Pepper, who happens to be Lydia's former arch rival. Guest: Richard Keith as Dylan.
3	"Who's Your Daddy?"	John Putch & Tripp Reed	Erin Cardillo & Richard Keith	August 17, 2015	0.62
When Lydia suspects that she could be pregnant, she begs Nate to keep it a secret from Jimmy until she can find out for sure. As Nate makes every attempt to avoid Jimmy at all costs, Jimmy begins to suspect that his best friend is hiding something and makes it his mission to find out what. Meanwhile, Harrison makes his intentions to win Lydia back clear to Jimmy, setting off some not-so-friendly competition. Elsewhere, Nate's complicated life gives Emma everything she needs to write the perfect country song. Guest: Robert Picardo as Dr. Robert Richter.
4	"Edibles Wrecks"	Tripp Reed	Erin Cardillo & Richard Keith	August 24, 2015	0.68
Nate is anxious that a food blogger is coming to review his restaurant. Lydia is afraid Jimmy is missing doing youthful activities and buys some cannabis-filled gummy bears that Nate eats without realising what they are. Everyone pitches in to get Nate through his special evening.
5	"Suffering & Succotash"	Tripp Reed	Erin Cardillo & Richard Keith	August 31, 2015	0.87
When Lydia's mother visits unexpectedly, she tries to hide her relationship with Jimmy by implying he and Nate are boyfriends. Lydia also indicates she is getting back together with Harrison to further complicate things.
6	"Get Forked"	Jonathan Silverman	Katie Schwartz	September 14, 2015	0.50
Concerned about Nate's uptight nature, Jimmy and Lydia sign him up on a dating site. After a succession of awful meet ups, Nate connects with Annie. Jimmy then recalls that he has seen Annie before due to her infamous Internet activities.
7	"Under Buddy"	Tripp Reed	Alex Safford & Amanda Pomeroy and Erin Cardillo & Richard Keith	September 21, 2015	0.47
Lydia asks Nate give Jimmy a busy night off but his replacement as bartender Timmy works out so well, Jimmy feels threatened. As Nate and Timmy start hanging out, Jimmy decides to compete to get his friend back.
8	"Home Is Where the Lamp Is"	Tripp Reed	Erin Cardillo & Richard Keith	September 28, 2015	0.67
Nate freaks out when Lydia decides to sell his childhood home so he enlists his father Harrison and friends to sabotage the open house. Jimmy becomes scared about his future with Lydia after a talk with Nate. Guests: Jerry O'Connell as Bob Babcock and Erin Cardillo as Parker.
9	"Not About Bob"	Tripp Reed	Erin Cardillo & Richard Keith	October 5, 2015	0.62
Jimmy falls into a deep depression after his breakup with Lydia and Nate feels responsible. Sam and Atticus help Nate show Jimmy his future if he can't make decisions while Harrison agrees to divorce Lydia.

== Casting and production ==
Created by Cardillo and Keith, the half-hour sitcom was developed for the digital platform CW Seed. Significant Mother was ordered to series for the CW on April 10, 2015, with Zuckerman and Allen attached to star and Silverman, Fitzpatrick and Adams rounding out the cast. On May 1, 2015, Buzolic was announced in the role of Jimmy.

Later in May 2015, Denise Richards was cast as local "cougar" Pepper Spinner. In June 2015, the CW announced guest stars Linda Gray as Gammy, Nate's grandmother and Lydia's conservative southern mother, and Jerry O'Connell as Bob Babcock, a "slick realtor". In August 2015, Terry Kiser, Silverman's costar from Weekend at Bernie's, was cast in a guest role.

== Broadcast ==
Significant Mother premiered on August 3, 2015.

== Reception ==
Brian Lowry of Variety wrote that "while the show does possess some energy thanks to the cast, there’s such a numbing sameness to the gags." On Rotten Tomatoes, the series has an aggregate score of 25% based on 2 positive and 6 negative critic reviews.
