= Richard Keith (writer/actor/director) =

American writer, actor, and director (born 1982)

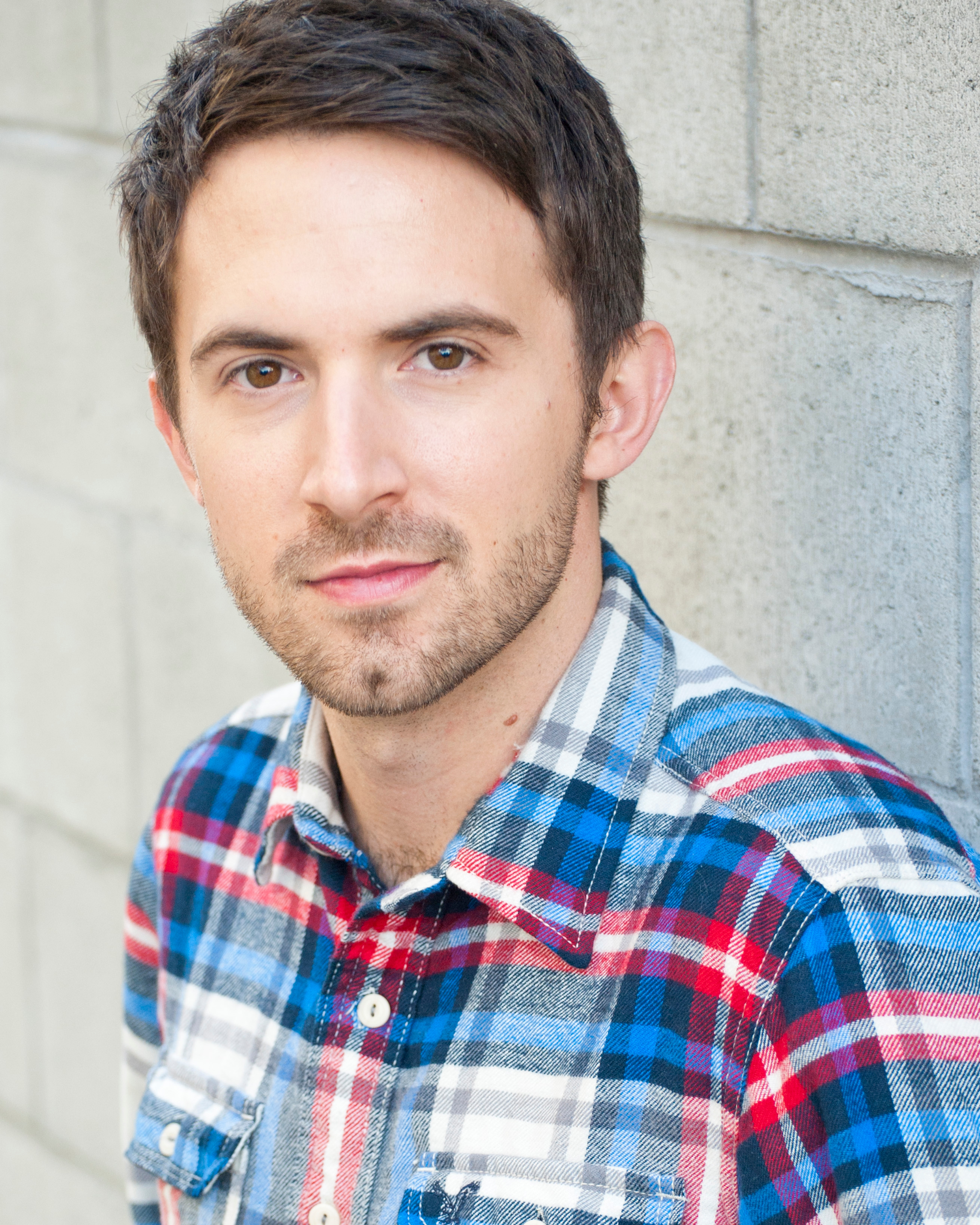
- Keith in November 2011
- Born: Richard Pragacz Keith; November 29, 1982 (age 43); Charlotte, North Carolina, U.S.
- Other names: Richard Pragacz Keith
- Occupations: Writer, producer, director
- Years active: 2001–present
- Spouse: Sarah Keith (2012–present)
- Parent(s): Bruce R. Keith (architect); Cindy Keith (nurse)
- Website: https://www.twitter.com/richkeith

Richard Keith (born November 29, 1982, in North Carolina) is an American writer, producer, director and actor. As a writer, he is known for creating Life Sentence on The CW, as well as writing and co-executive producing the Full House sequel Fuller House for Netflix and creating the CW series Significant Mother all with his partner Erin Cardillo. He also wrote and directed the short film Grow Up Already and as an actor he has appeared on countless TV series including Grey's Anatomy and Roger on the American television series Quintuplets.

== Biography ==
Richard Keith is a writer, producer and director who is writing and executive producing three broadcast pilots for the 2019 TV season along with his partner Erin Cardillo under their "In Good Company" shingle. The first, "3000 Hours" is an hour drama that follows the lives of five PsyD psychology students doing the 3000 clinical hours required to get their degree. The project is set up as a put pilot at NBC and is being produced by Berlanti Productions and Warner Bros. Television. The second project, "The Family Practice" is an hour drama based in the world of adoption, foster care and family law which is set up as a put pilot for Fox. Jason Winer (Modern Family) is set to direct and executive produce under his Little Dog Picture Company banner and 20th Century Fox Television is the studio. And their third project in development at The CW is "Nobody's Princess," an hour-long musical comedy which re-imagines the stories of four, classic fairy tale princesses in contemporary New York City. Cardillo and Keith will co-write the project with Michael Winer and Alan Zachary ("First Date" on Broadway) and James Corden ("The Late Late Show with James Corden") will executive produce along with his company Fulwell73. CBS Television Studios is the studio. Previously, Cardillo & Keith served as executive producers on the CW series Life Sentence, which they also created. In addition to Life Sentence, they also co-created and executive produced the 1/2 hour comedy Significant Mother for The CW and served as co-executive producers the second season of "Fuller House" for Netflix. Keith also wrote and directed the short film Grow Up Already, which screened at the over a dozen festivals including The NapaValley Film Festival, The LA Shortsfest and The Atlantic Film Festival. The film was produced by Sycamore Pictures (The Hollars, The Way Way Back) and starred Johnny Simmons & Odette Annable.

== Filmography (Writing/Directing/Producing) ==
=== Television ===
- Life Sentence (2018) - The CW .... Created By, Executive Producer
- Fuller House (2016) - Netflix .... Writer, Co-Executive Producer
- Significant Mother (2014) - The CW .... Created By, Writer, Executive Producer
- The Last Resort (Pilot) (2011).... Staff Writer

=== Film ===
- Fall (2015) .... Writer, Producer
- Grow Up Already (Short) (2012) .... Writer, Director

== Filmography (Acting) ==
=== Film ===
- Teacher of The Year (2014) .... Ian Donovon
- City Baby (2014) .... Michael
- Privileged (2008) .... Thomas
- Bull Run (2007) .... Young Dennis
- The Intern (2006) (short) .... Jason Goldfarb "The Intern"
- American Pie Presents: Band Camp (2005) .... Trading Card Bandie
- Formosa (2005) .... Jimmy McNichol

=== Television ===
- Desperate Housewives (2004) (1 episode, 2011) .... Jeff
- Grey's Anatomy (2005) (3 episodes, 2007) .... Intern Mitch
- Veronica Mars (2004) (1 episode, 2007) .... Brian
- NCIS (2003) (1 episode, 2006) .... Frank Dreyer
- Center of the Universe (2004) (1 episode, 2004) .... Ryan
- Quintuplets (2004) (3 episodes, 2004) .... Roger
- Boston Public (2000) (1 episode, 2003) .... Trevor James
- Ed (2000) (1 episode, 2001) .... Different Student
