= Nikki Rodriguez =

American actress

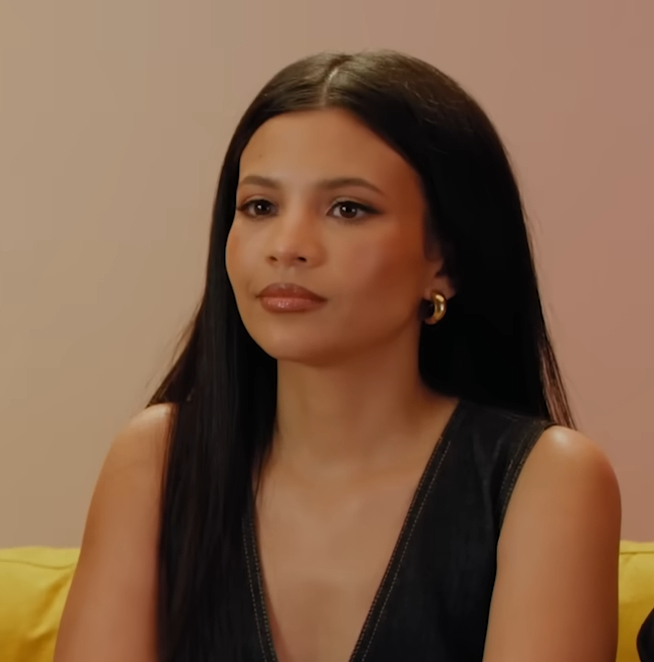
- Rodriguez in 2025
- Occupations: Actress; model
- Years active: 2017–present
- Television: My Life with the Walter Boys; On My Block

Nikki Rodriguez is an American actress and model. She is best known for her role as Jackie Howard in the Netflix teen drama series My Life with the Walter Boys (2023) and for her role in On My Block (2018).

== Early life and education ==
Rodriguez was born to a Mexican father and a mother of British and German heritage. Rodriguez was raised as an only child, spending most of her upbringing in Minneapolis, Minnesota. She moved to Los Angeles "straight out of school" to pursue acting, having previously visited the city at age 15 with her father.

== Career ==
Rodriguez began her acting career in 2018, making her debut in the short film This Land is Your Land. She started acting professionally, quickly gaining experience with appearances in projects like Speechless (2019) and Adam Ruins Everything (2019). Her breakthrough role came in 2022 when she starred as Vero, Cesar's girlfriend, in the Netflix series On My Block.

In 2023, Rodriguez took on the lead role of Jackie Howard in the Netflix teen drama series My Life with the Walter Boys (2023).

== Filmography ==
Key
†	Denotes films that have not yet been released

=== Television ===
Year	Title	Role	Notes	Ref.
2019	Speechless	Madison	1 episode	
2019	Adam Ruins Everything	Brie	1 episode	
2021	On My Block	Vero	Recurring role (season 4)	
2023–present	My Life with the Walter Boys	Jackie Howard	Main role	

=== Film ===
Year	Title	Role	Notes	Ref.
2018	This Land is Your Land	Prisoner 2	Short film	
2019	Roadkill	Tammy	Short film	
2020	Bunny Run	Mackenzie		
2020	Father.	Sal		
2023	Back to Lyla	Sarah		
