= Noah LaLonde =

American actor (born 1998)

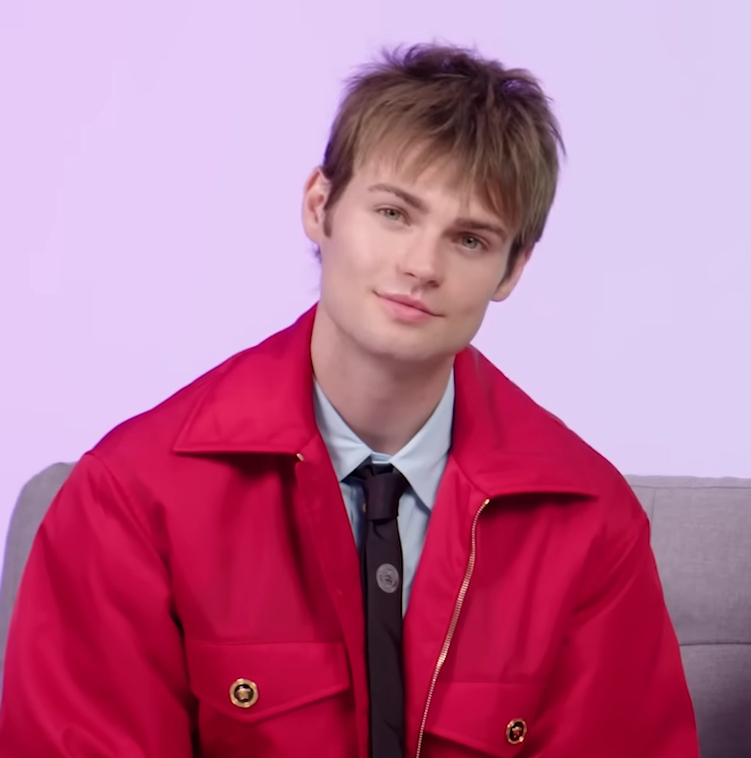
- LaLonde in 2025
- Born: March 22, 1998 (age 28); Macomb, Michigan, U.S
- Occupation: Actor
- Years active: 2020–present
- Known for: My Life with the Walter Boys

Noah LaLonde (born March 22, 1998) is an American actor. He is known for playing Cole Walter in My Life with the Walter Boys (2023–present).

== Early life and education ==
LaLonde was born in Macomb, Michigan on March 22, 1998. He was raised in Detroit, where he played hockey and showed interest in acting. In elementary school he participated in school plays and then, in middle school, he joined a theatrical choir program. He has played for Youngstown Phantoms and Omaha Lancers during his hockey career. He also played in Grand Valley State University's hockey team, where he studied theatre.

== Career ==
After appearing in several short films, LaLonde played Rece in Asbury Park (2021). In 2022, he starred in Deer Camp '86 as Wes. He also appeared in Criminal Minds: Evolution (2022) as Gael Bruneau. In 2023, he rose to prominence playing Cole Walter in Netflix's series, My Life with the Walter Boys (2023–present).

On November 20, 2025, Deadline announced that LaLonde would star in Katherine Center’s The Bodyguard film adaptation, Guarding Stars.

== Filmography ==
=== Film ===
Year	Title	Role	Notes
2020	The Smile I Wear	Hero	Short film
2020	Toby... With an 'I'	Buck	Short film
2021	Summer Flings & Funerals	Uncredited name	Short film
2021	Asbury Park	Rece	
2021	Help Wanted	Troy Simmons	Short film
2022	Deer Camp '86	Wes	Main role
2026	Guarding Stars	Hank Stapleton	

=== Television ===
Year	Title	Role	Notes
2022	Criminal Minds: Evolution	Gael Bruneau	Episode: Pay-Per-View
2023–present	My Life with the Walter Boys	Cole Walter	Main role
