= Tommy Dorfman =

American actress (born 1992)

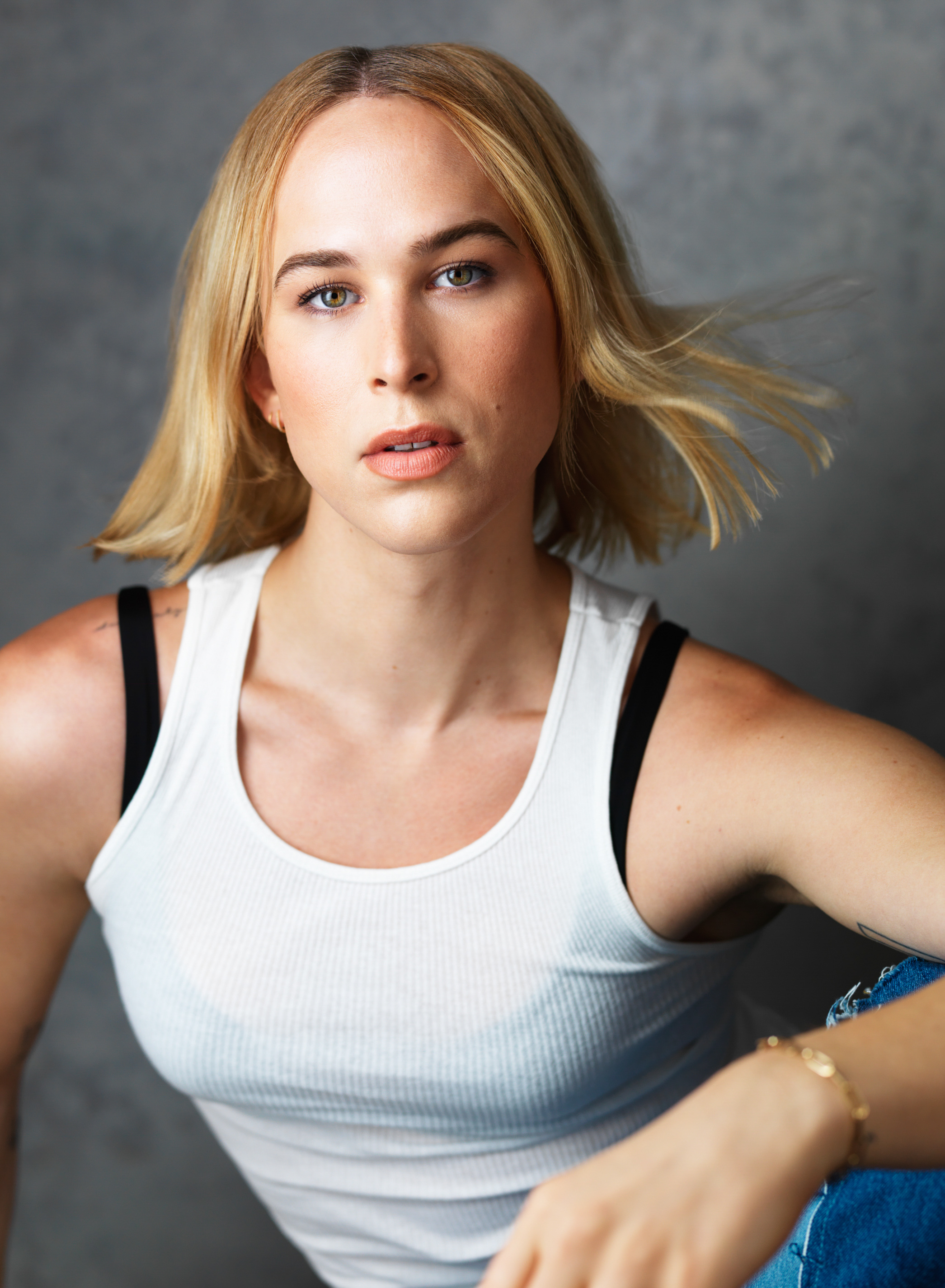
- Dorfman in 2022
- Born: May 13, 1992 (age 34); Atlanta, Georgia, U.S.
- Education: Fordham University
- Occupation: Actress
- Years active: 2009–present
- Spouses: Peter Zurkuhlen (m. 2016; div. 2022) Elise Williams (m. 2023)
- Relatives: Andi Dorfman (cousin)

Tommy Dorfman (born May 13, 1992) is an American actress, best known for playing Ryan Shaver in the Netflix series 13 Reasons Why (2017).

== Early life and education ==
Dorfman was born and raised in Atlanta, Georgia, to a Jewish family. Her cousin is Andi Dorfman, a former contestant on The Bachelorette. Dorfman graduated from Fordham University's drama program in 2015 with a B.A. in theatre arts.

== Career ==
After graduating from university, Dorfman was cast in the role of Ryan Shaver on the Netflix drama 13 Reasons Why, which premiered in 2017. Also that year, she helped design a fashion collection with ASOS, and in October was honored with the Rising Star Award by GLAAD.

In the spring of 2019, Dorfman made her New York theatrical debut in The New Group's production of Jeremy O. Harris's play Daddy, directed by Danya Taymor.

In 2024 she directed and co-wrote the film I Wish You All the Best, about a teen's coming out as non-binary, which received positive reviews. Dorfman's direction was praised by Variety as making "an attractive look and smooth pace."

In 2025, she starred in the Off-Broadway production of Becoming Eve by Emil Weinstein based on the memoir by Abby Chava Stein, playing the role of Chava. For her performance, Dorfman was nominated for the 2025 Drama League Award for Distinguished Performance and the 2026 Dorian Award for Outstanding Lead Performance in an Off-Broadway Production.

== Personal life ==
Dorfman is queer. Dorfman and Peter Zurkuhlen became engaged in April 2015 and married in Portland, Maine, on November 12, 2016. In July 2021, Dorfman revealed she and Zurkuhlen had divorced but remain friends.

In November 2017, Dorfman came out as non-binary and began using they pronouns. On July 22, 2021, Dorfman came out as a transgender woman and began using she pronouns. She revealed in an interview that she had already been "privately identifying and living as a woman" for almost a year. She chose to retain her birth name of Tommy, to which she feels "very connected" and which honors her mother's brother who died when Dorfman was a month old. In April 2022, Dorfman identified as a lesbian.

In May 2024, Dorfman revealed that she had secretly eloped with her girlfriend, Elise Williams, in Malibu, California, around late 2023.

== Filmography ==
Year	Title	Role	Notes
2009	Foreign Exchange	Student	Short film
2013	In My Skin	Julian	Short film
2016	i-Witness	Rob Jr.	Episode: "The Smith Sisters"
2017–2018; 2020	13 Reasons Why	Ryan Shaver	Recurring (seasons 1–2); Guest (season 4); 18 episodes
2019	Jane the Virgin	Bobby	Recurring role
2019	American Princess	Nick	Recurring role
2019	Fluidity	Daniel	
2019	Insatiable	Jonathan	2 episodes
2020	Love, Victor	Justin	Episode: "Boys' Trip"
2020	RuPaul's Drag Race All Stars	Guest judge	Episode: "Snatch Game of Love"
2020	Love in the Time of Corona	Oscar	Main role
2021	The Shuroo Process	Mark	
2022	Sharp Stick	Tali	
2024	Fantasmas	Commercial Director	1 episode
2026	Elsbeth	Klea Zane	Episode: "Death of a Playwright"

== Stage credits ==
Year	Title	Role	Venue	Ref.
2019	Daddy	Performer	Off-Broadway, Pershing Square Signature Center/Vineyard Theatre	
2024	Romeo + Juliet	The Nurse / Tybalt	Broadway, Circle in the Square Theatre	
2025	Becoming Eve	Chava	Off-Broadway, New York Theatre Workshop	

== Awards and nominations ==
Year	Award	Category	Work	Result	Ref.
2025	Drama League Award	Distinguished Performance	Becoming Eve	Nominated	
2026	Dorian Award	Outstanding Lead Performance in an Off-Broadway Production	Becoming Eve	Nominated	
