= Erin Cardillo =

American actress

- Born: White Plains, New York, United States
- Occupation: Actress
- Years active: 1995–present
- Spouse: Joe Towne (m. 2011; div. 2023)
- Children: 1
- Website: erincardillo.com

Erin Cardillo is an American actress, producer, and television writer. Cardillo co-created Significant Mother (2015–2016). As an actress, she is known for her role as Ms. Tutweiler on The Suite Life on Deck and her role as Esme Vanderheusen in Passions.

== Biography ==
Cardillo was born in White Plains, New York. Her father is Catholic and her mother is Jewish. She began her acting career while at Greenwich High School in Greenwich, Connecticut. She then attended Northwestern University from which she graduated magna cum laude in 1999 with a Bachelor of Science degree in performance studies. It was there that she began to explore writing and adaptation, as well as acting. She spent her junior year abroad in London, through Marymount College. After college, Erin moved to New York and worked extensively on stage, but a decision to pursue a career in film and television brought her to Los Angeles. She returned to the stage in 2012, originating the leading role of Melody Dent in Under My Skin at the Pasadena Playhouse. She pivoted to writing in 2015 and created and produced Significant Mother and Life Sentence for the CW under her banner, In Good Company, with writing partner, Richard Keith. Both are currently serving as executive producers and writers on Netflix's hit series Virgin River (TV series). Her first feature, Isn't It Romantic, was produced by Newline Cinema and had a theatrical release in 2019.

== Personal life ==
Cardillo married actor Joe Towne on November 5, 2011. The couple welcomed their first child, a son named Lucas Bodhi, on December 17, 2016. The couple divorced in 2023.

== Filmography ==
=== Film ===
Year	Title	Role	Notes
2004	The Greatest Short Film Ever!!!	Jamie	Short
2004	The Murder of Donovan Slain	Donovain Slain / Beth Mack / Mary Duffy	Short
2005	In the Mix	Rachelle	
2006	Even Money	Anne	Short
2007	The Box	Tatiana	
2008	Superglue	Lauren	Short
2009	Four Steps	Jackie	Short
2010	The Truth	Dana Davenport	
2010	Sex Tax: Based on a True Story	Nicki Daniels	
2011	Son of Morning	Jennifer	
2013	RockBarnes: The Emperor in You	Sasha	
2014	Dance-Off	Randi	

=== Television ===
Year	Title	Role	Notes
2000	Madigan Men	Nicole	"Three Guys, a Girl, and a Conversation Nook"
2001	Law & Order	Jenny	"Myth of Fingerprints"
2002	That '70s Show	Lisa	"Over the Hills and Far Away"
2003	Strong Medicine	Gayla	"PMS, Lies and Red Tape"
2003	All That	Makeout Girl	"Nodesha"
2003	Coupling	Connie	"Nipple Effect"
2005	Crossing Jordan	Peta Longo	"Skin and Bone"
2005	Without a Trace	Karen Garber	"Honor Bound"
2005–08	Passions	Esme Vanderheusen	Recurring role
2006	Freddie	Veronica	"The Mixer"
2007	How I Met Your Mother	Treasure	"Bachelor Party"
2007	Las Vegas	Kelly Crever	"Head Games"
2008	CSI: NY	Elizabeth Barker	"The Box"
2008–11	The Suite Life on Deck	Emma Tutweiller	Recurring role
2010	Justified	Samantha	"Fixer"
2011	CSI: Miami	Brooke Shepherd	"Caged"
2011	The Last Resort	Ms. Morehead	TV film
2012	Man Up!	Gina	"Up All Night"
2012	Hawaii Five-0	Megan Koruba	"Kupale"
2012	The Client List	Skyler	"Games People Play"
2013	Bones	Lauren Martin	"The Blood from the Stones"
2013	Castle	Cindy Paralti	"The Squab and the Quail"
2013	Melissa & Joey	Lauren	"Toxic Parents"
2013	D-TEC: Pilot	Natalie Buchanan	TV film
2015	Significant Mother	Parker	"Home Is Where the Lamp Is", "Not About Bob"
2015	Criminal Minds	Jillian Carter	"Internal Affairs"

=== Writer and producer ===
Erin Cardillo is executive producer and writer for the following TV series and films:
