= List of I Didn't Do It episodes =

I Didn't Do It is an American comedy television series that originally aired on Disney Channel from January 17, 2014, to October 16, 2015. The series was created by Josh Silverstein and Tod Himmel, and stars Olivia Holt, Austin North, Piper Curda, Peyton Clark, and Sarah Gilman.

== Series overview ==
Season	Episodes	Originally released	
Season	Episodes	First released	Last released
1	20	January 17, 2014	December 7, 2014
2	19	February 15, 2015	October 16, 2015

== Episodes ==
=== Season 1 (2014) ===
No. overall	No. in season	Title	Directed by	Written by	Original release date	Prod. code	U.S. viewers (millions)
1	1	"The Pilot" "Pilot"	Bruce Leddy	Tod Himmel & Josh Silverstein	January 17, 2014	101	3.89
On their first day of high school, twin siblings Lindy and Logan Watson meet the football team's quarterback, Seth Wall, whom Lindy instantly crushes on, while Logan wants to befriend him in order to make his and Garrett's lives during high school much easier. When their parents travel out of town for work, each of the two siblings thinks of a party that will bond them with Seth, but their parties are arranged on the same night and end up conflicting. Things get worse when they believe that their babysitter has died, and they don't have a chance to cancel the party. Guest stars: Angela Paton as Mrs. Klasby, Matt Champagne as Bert "Bob" Watson, Alex Kapp Horner as Nora Watson, Chad Buchanan as Seth Wall, Larry Joe Campbell as Deputy Doug Peterman, Alan Chow as Eddie White, Claire Beale as young Lindy, Jacob Johnson as young Logan
2	2	"Fireman Freddy's Spaghetti Station"	Bruce Leddy	Tod Himmel	January 26, 2014	104	2.44
Delia's mom forces Delia to get a job or re-enter beauty pageants because she thinks she has too much free time. Lindy finds her one as a hostess at Fireman Freddy's Spaghetti Station, the gang's favorite restaurant when they were younger. Delia, however, turns out not to be the hostess Freddy wants. When Lindy welcomes a family into the joint, Freddy convinces her to be the new hostess, much to Delia's dismay. When Lindy tries to quit, Freddy asks her to stay for a big birthday party coming up and leaves her in charge, to which her bitter coworkers respond by quitting and leaving her alone to handle everything. Meanwhile, Logan and Garrett are bullied by some obnoxious kids who have taken their place at Rumble Juice, and they try to retrieve it. Guest stars: Christopher Darga as Freddy, Alyssa Preston as Mona, Pappy Faulkner as Kyle, Reggie Brown as the manager
3	3	"The New Guy"	Bruce Leddy	Rob Lotterstein	February 9, 2014	103	2.46
After watching a romantic film, Logan and Garrett argue that their group votes are unfair, since there are more girls than boys, thus they end up always doing girl activities. At school, they decide to invite a new guy, Tom Bigham from California, to the group. Even though it seems like a good idea at first, he turns out to be quite annoying, and the group decides to give him away, without success. After this, they plan to make Tom leave them. They learn that he is very afraid of heights, so they decide to pretend they love skydiving and that it is their favorite activity. It doesn't work well, as Tom decides to face his fears, and the group actually goes skydiving. Guest stars: Cameron Palatas as Tom, Chris Elwood as the skydiving instructor
4	4	"Dear High School Self"	Bruce Leddy	Judd Pillot	February 16, 2014	102	2.88
While Lindy is looking through the mail, she finds a letter she wrote to herself during third grade. Lindy reads her letter and finds out she wished for better friends by the time she gets to high school. When everyone else gets theirs, Lindy hides the letter and tells her friends that she hasn't received it yet. They go looking for it in their old third-grade classroom and in the post office, when they realize that Lindy is hiding something. Lindy throws the letter away, and the group looks for it in the school's garbage room. When they finally read it, it causes a rift between Lindy and the group. Lindy then invites them to their third-grade classroom again to explain why she wrote the letter. She reveals that while she was writing the letter, her pencil lead broke and she got up to sharpen it. When she got up, her skirt was stuck in her tights, and for the rest of the school year, everyone, including the group, called her "Little Lindy Bunchy Booty." Lindy apologizes, and the group reconciles with a hug. Guest stars: Bonnie Hellman as Mrs. Babcock, Kimberly Hebert-Gregory as Mail Lady
5	5	"If It Tastes Like a Brussels Sprout"	Bruce Leddy	Alessia Costantini	March 9, 2014	106	2.04
Lindy tries to convince her school that eating vegetables is a healthy choice, but everyone disagrees. Logan and Jasmine create a spray that makes vegetables taste better and more appealing, called "Happy Time Flavor Changing Yum Yum Spray." The whole school loves the spray, and Logan, Jasmine, Garrett, and Delia are invited to guest star on a show called Barracuda Boardroom, which features three billionaires willing to invest in products brought to them by young entrepreneurs. Lindy is desperate to be with them as she is jealous of how they are able to succeed in the spray, which she thought was a ridiculous idea, to Logan's amusement. Logan wants to make it blue, but Jasmine disapproves of the idea. When Lindy asks to join the group on the show, Jasmine accepts, to Logan's dismay. He decides to get revenge on Jasmine by adding the blue to the spray. When they're on Barracuda Boardroom, one of the judges claims she is ready to make an offer. Since Logan changed the formula by adding the blue color, it doesn't agree with the judges' stomachs, and he subsequently gets vomited on by the judges.
6	6	"Lindy-licious" "Lindylicious"	Bruce Leddy	Sarah Jane Cunningham & Suzie V. Freeman	March 16, 2014	105	1.92
Lindy wins a contest at Rumble Juice for their Create-a-Smoothie competition. The blendisto who picked her smoothie, Cole, asks Lindy out, to which she says yes. Lindy finds out that Cole wants to date her, so she brings Jasmine, Garrett, and Delia with her to the movies to avoid sending him the wrong message. Lindy's smoothie then gets taken off the menu because the date went terribly. He then chooses another girl's smoothie and proceeds to go out with her. Lindy then goes to sell her smoothie in the cinema to show Cole what he lost. Meanwhile, Garrett goes undercover to investigate why the cinema claims the popcorn is freshly popped, but tastes stale. Jasmine has a crush on a guy who works at the movie theater, only to discover from Delia that she only likes him because he wears a tuxedo. She later finds out that he only likes her because she wears high heels. Logan tries to finish a book report on The Odyssey, but when he fails to concentrate, he tries to steal Delia's report. Delia gets revenge on him by making him watch a Greek film, which she claims is a film adaptation of The Odyssey. Guest stars: Wesam Keesh as Cole, Nicholas Podany as Max
7	7	"Snow Problem"	Bruce Leddy	Rob Lotterstein	April 6, 2014	107	2.26
The Watson family, Jasmine, Garrett, and Delia go to spend the weekend at a snowboarding chalet. Upon arriving, Lindy takes Garrett to a snowboarding class. She develops a crush on his instructor and pretends to be a beginner so he can work with her. After he starts paying attention to Garrett, she gets jealous and pretends to have hurt her foot, so his attention would shift back to her. In the cabin, Jasmine doesn't want to go snowboarding because she didn't bring her makeup bag. Delia is reading a book about the pioneer Penelope Harkness. When Bert and Nora get stuck in an antique store, Logan is left in charge. Guest stars: Alex Kapp Horner as Nora Watson, Matt Champagne as Bert Watson, Robert Scott Wilson as Dash
8	8	"Dance Fever"	Bruce Leddy	Tod Himmel	April 13, 2014	111	2.26
A few days before the school's Spring Fling dance, Sherri and Lindy become the only two students with perfect attendance records after Greg Johnson gets sick. Sherri threatens Lindy, saying that she will eventually be the only with a perfect attendance record, making her paranoid about Sherri trying to make her sick. After Lindy gets a cold, she insists on going to school while Sherri realizes this and tries even harder to make Lindy miss school, even resorting to locking her in the janitor's closet. Lindy ends up accidentally breaking Sherri's leg during her escape and inadvertently spreads her flu to every student at school. Logan is going to the dance with a girl called Seanna Bergdorf, but is in need of the expensive gifts he had promised her. He gets many companies to sponsor his date. After Seanna gets hurt, Logan is now going with Sherri. Garrett wants to invite Tiffany, a girl from school, to the dance. However, he wants to do it the best and most original way possible, but many of his ideas fail when someone tries them before him. Jasmine waits for a guy called Dave Bixby to invite her to the dance, while Delia's grandma is visiting and Delia starts acting like her. Guest stars: Peyton List as Sherri, Tristen Bankston as Steve, Scott Shilstone as Dave Bixby, Barry Finkel as Mr. Applebaum, Alan Chow as Eddie White
9	9	"Now Museum, Now You Don't"	Bruce Leddy	Sarah Jane Cunningham & Suzie V. Freeman	May 4, 2014	108	1.88
Lindy gets an internship at the Chicago museum which has recently got a Nefertiti exhibit and has big expectations for it. However, it turns out that her job consists on telling people not to use the stairs while her strict boss, Judy, wants her to do everything right. After Logan gets a job in the museum's gift shop after creating a popular N4TT t-shirt, Lindy realizes that everyone else has access to things such as a break room and are even invited to Judy's party. Lindy tells Logan she is upset about it and that it is unfair, making Logan upset as well at the fact that Lindy always assumes his way is the wrong one. Delia is convinced that she is a descendant of Nefertiti, until Jasmine decides to help her to collect some of the Nefertiti mummy's DNA in the museum. Garrett tries different methods to get rid of his habit of biting his nails. Guest stars: Beth Grant as Judy Tanzer-Dinkins, Karen McClain as Dr. Lommein
10	10	"In the Doghouse with the White House"	Joel Zwick	Rob Lotterstein	June 22, 2014	115	2.71
The whole school goes on a trip to Washington D.C. to see the White House. Once there, Lindy wants to see the president, but ends up stuck outside of the balcony while Delia and Jasmine are out. Upon arriving, Garrett still loathes hotels, but soon learns to like them after he gets to know the spa. Logan goes out and meets Senator Snell, who thinks Logan has good traits to work with the government. Delia wants an official Penelope Harkness stamp, so she dresses as a statue of her and wants Jasmine to help her cheer to people and achieve her goal. Everyone besides her, however, thinks this is stupid. The president's dog accidentally gets in Delia's purse before they return to the hotel. After they meet at the hotel, some agents come for the missing dog and the five friends are taken to an interrogation, where they try to tell what happened. Guest stars: Reggie Brown as the president, Annie Abbot as the cleaning lady, Kevin Symons as Senator Snell, Rob Nagle as the interrogator, Renee Percy as the news reporter
11	11	"Phone Challenge"	Bruce Leddy	Josh Silverstein	June 29, 2014	109	1.76
Logan meets a girl named Haley at the mall. After Logan gets her number, an accident causes his phone to fall into a smoothie, making him desperate. After rushing home, Lindy tells him that leaving the phone in rice for 72 hours will dry it out, so they do it. Logan starts to freak out, so the rest of the group decides to go the whole 72 hours without their phones as well. Some time later, Jasmine gives up and uses another phone secretly and Garrett becomes unusually calm and discovers he has a big talent for art. Delia meets a boy by a singing telegram, but he turns out to be younger than she thought when she gets to actually meet him. Logan is back at the museum in order to tell Haley about why he didn't text her anymore. After the 72 hours are over, Haley tells Logan that her brother is coming to get him because he fooled her. After an accident that makes Logan fall into a fountain, Lindy, Garrett, and Delia trick Jasmine into falling as revenge for breaking off their pact. Guest stars: Sedona Cohen as Haley, Larry Joe Campbell as Doug Peterman, Raymond Ochoa as Zane, Markus Silbiger as Haley's brother
12	12	"Twin It to Win It"	Bruce Leddy	Josh Silverstein	July 13, 2014	110	2.03
Lindy and Logan are believed to have telepathic powers, allowing the two to be able to communicate with one another by their minds. The two are put into a contest to test their skills on how well they can understand one another.
13	13	"Earth Boys Are Icky"	Lynn McCracken	Josh Silverstein	July 27, 2014	119	2.36
Logan dates a girl named Danica who turns out to be the vice principal's daughter. Delia uses a device to communicate with aliens when she thinks earth boys are too normal for her. Garrett's school program's big buddy leaves him and Logan persuades him to become a big buddy to a boy named Finn. After Lindy learns of her friends using her as parents' approval to go places not allowed, she bumps up her attitude and tries to be a worse person. At the end, Finn is revealed to be an "alien" and requests that Lindy comes with him, all because his parents don't allow him to use the UFO, much to her dismay.
14	14	"Lindy Nose Best"	Bruce Leddy	Judd Pillot	August 10, 2014	112	2.14
Lindy finds out that she has a lower grade than Logan on her history report because her being opinionated accidentally caused her teacher to lose his girlfriend. Delia tells Garrett to try and stand up to the football team coach, but loses his spot on the football team as kicker and Delia replaces him. Jasmine and Logan fake date to make Jasmine's ex-boyfriend, Mike, jealous and to show Jenna that Logan is boyfriend material. Delia gets Garrett back on the football team. Jasmine ends up actually falling for Logan and decides to confess her feelings to him, but as she is about to do this, she sees Logan and Jenna on a date and decides not to tell him, leaving her heartbroken. Guest star: Marc Evan Jackson as Mr. Buffington, JC Gonzalez as Mike
15	15	"Ball or Nothing"	Joel Zwick	Tod Himmel	August 24, 2014	118	1.86
Lindy accidentally destroys their father's football signed by NFL Hall of Famer Dick Butkus. Lindy seeks the help of Logan to track down the famed football player to re-sign the ball before their dad finds out. The two then go to extreme measures to get him to do so, which involves telling him that their father is in a full-body cast and bandaging Garrett up as their father. Special guest star: Dick Butkus as himself
16	16	"Logan's Run"	Bruce Leddy	Sasha Stroman	September 21, 2014	113	1.73
Logan finds out that his friends think he runs in a strange fashion and fakes an injury to get out of Lindy's Jog-a-Thon. Delia inadvertently gets Brenda fired from her job at Rumble Juice when she forgets to put the lid on one of the blenders. Delia desperately tries to find Brenda another job with Jasmine's help. Garrett becomes obsessed with a debt Logan owes him. Meanwhile, Lindy tries to disprove Jasmine and Delia's theory that she lives at the "Blonde Bubble." Guest star: Dana Powell as Brenda
17	17	"Bad News"	Joel Zwick	Darin Henry	September 28, 2014	117	1.97
Jasmine is selected to host the school's morning announcement videos, but to her dismay, many of her fellow students find it boring until Logan steps in as co-anchor. Lindy gets a boy to study with her, but soon becomes annoyed with his constant desire to learn. Garrett has trouble with real girls, so he turns his attention to digital girls. Guest star: Ron Butler as Mr. Kupchek
18	18	"Next of Pumpkin"	Judd Pillot	Judd Pillot	October 5, 2014	120	2.30
Logan gets upset when Lindy accidentally leaves him behind when the fire alarm goes off. Meanwhile, Delia tries to win an award for growing the largest pumpkin. Jasmine asks Garrett to go to the dance competition with her, but he fails to make it and she ends up dancing with Logan. At the end, Garrett overhears Jasmine's feelings for Logan.
19	19	"Bicycle Thief"	Joel Zwick	Eddie Quintana	November 2, 2014	114	1.84
Lindy convinces Garrett to go bike riding with her, only to discover he has never ridden a bike. Their bike ends up being stolen and they both try to find it.
20	20	"Merry Miss Sis"	Joel Zwick	Sarah Jane Cunningham & Suzie V. Freeman	December 7, 2014	116	2.05
Logan gets upset with Lindy when she takes her obsession with Christmas too far and he wishes he never had a sister. An angel grants his wish and he experiences life without Lindy. In addition to this, the Lindy of this alternate reality, who is no longer Logan's sister, has dropped out of school, Jasmine is a bad girl, Garrett is a dirty hippy, and Delia is a cheerleader. In the end, Logan realizes how much Lindy means to him. Guest star: Reginald VelJohnson as Angel Santos

=== Season 2 (2015) ===
No. overall	No. in season	Title	Directed by	Written by	Original release date	Prod. code	U.S. viewers (millions)
21	1	"Slumber Partay!"	Jody Margolin Hahn	Phil Baker	February 15, 2015	201	2.46
Lindy tries to throw an epic slumber party with Delia and Jasmine, but her plans land the three best friends on the other side of the law. Meanwhile, Logan helps Garrett turn his family garage into their own man cave and the two wind up getting trapped inside by a wild animal. Rumble Juice gets a new manager named Betty LeBow. Guest stars: Karen Malina White as Betty LeBow, Dennis Cockrum as Officer Wright, Paul Rogan as Mr. Jenkins
22	2	"The Not-So-Secret Lives of Mosquitoes and Muskrats"	Jody Margolin Hahn	Tom Palmer	March 1, 2015	202	2.17
Lindy and her friends become outcasts when their fellow Muskrats learn Lindy went on a date with a student from their arch rival Mikita Mosquitoes. Meanwhile, Garrett starts to freak out when he realizes he’s the only one of the five who hasn’t experienced a first kiss. Guest stars: Michael Grant as Jake, Jerry Kernion as Coach Beecroft
23	3	"Lindy Goes to the Dogs!"	Bob Koherr	Jeanette Collins & Mimi Friedman	March 8, 2015	203	2.31
Lindy falls in love with a puppy she is fostering and has a hard time letting him go to his new family. Meanwhile, Jasmine and Delia get extremely competitive over their design projects in Home EC.
24	4	"Lindy & Logan Get Psyched"	Bob Koherr	Erika Kaestle & Patrick McCarthy	March 15, 2015	204	1.61
When Delia takes an Intro to Psychology class, Lindy and Logan become her first patients. In the meantime, Jasmine joins Garrett's Math Squad and gives the group of quirky math geniuses a confidence makeover that leads to a revolt.
25	5	"Dog Date Afternoon"	Bob Koherr	Tom Palmer	March 22, 2015	206	1.69
Jasmine lands a new set of older friends when she volunteers at the senior center. Meanwhile, Delia borrows Lindy's foster pooch, Ralph, for a date with Brandon and his dog, Coco, and ends up bringing the wrong dog back. In the end, Delia finds out that they both like cats and Brandon says that he was walking his mom's dog and only said that he liked dogs for an excuse to go out with her.
26	6	"Logan Finds Out!"	Bob Koherr	Jim Gerkin	March 29, 2015	205	1.58
After Logan gets dumped by his girlfriend, Lindy and Delia inadvertently learn that Jasmine likes him. In fear he may not feel the same, Jasmine begs her friends to keep her secret. Later, when Jasmine learns that Logan and Erin are back together, she admits to Logan that she really likes him, when she thinks she is talking to Garrett, because she didn't know that Logan had replaced Garrett as the tree for Delia's drama class small play. Logan talks to Lindy about the fact he knows Jasmine likes him and isn't sure yet how he feels about her. Jasmine comes into Rumble Juice, saying she's happy for Logan and Erin, whilst holding back her tears. Logan and Erin leave for their movie date, leaving Jasmine heartbroken, again.
27	7	"Food Fight"	Jody Margolin Hahn	Michael Fitzpatrick	April 8, 2015	208	1.05
Lindy is excited about her new gig as the school's food critic until she dines at a family restaurant and the food is terrible. Meanwhile, Jasmine gets a babysitting job and winds up competing with her nine-year-old charge. Meanwhile, Garrett is tired of Logan bailing out of their plans to hang out with his girlfriend. So, Garrett befriends a customer, Hogan, who is very similar to Logan. In jealousy, Logan pays a guy to be his friend "Barrett", who copies Garrett's mannerisms and habits.
28	8	"Stevie Likes Lindy"	Bob Koherr	Phil Baker	April 19, 2015	207	2.22
Stevie Moops, a 12 year-old mogul millionaire, tries to win Lindy's heart by giving her outrageous and expensive gifts. Lindy denies him, however, because they are several years apart in age. Meanwhile, Delia finds out that Garrett has been hiding a secret and takes advantage of it. Later on, Stevie realizes that he is taking too many chances with a girl much older than he is, and Lindy offers to help him win the heart of a girl his own age. Special guest star: Corey Fogelmanis as Stevie Moops.
29	9	"Falling for... Who?"	Jody Margolin Hahn	Erika Kaestle & Patrick McCarthy	May 31, 2015	209	2.20
Logan finally realizes he has feelings for Jasmine during the fall dance, when he sees Jasmine dancing with Owen and falls in love with her. Meanwhile, Garrett learns to dance from Betty's nephew, Kevin. In the end, Logan breaks up with Erin to be with Jasmine and finally admits his feelings for her, saying that he wanted to be the one dancing with her. Logan tries to ask Jasmine out, but he is too late, because she has started dating Owen. Logan says he's happy for Jasmine, whilst holding back his tears. Jasmine leaves with Owen and, even though it's not very noticeable, Logan cries over Jasmine a little, which proves how strong his feelings are for her. When Logan asks Lindy how Jasmine met Owen, she doesn't want to tell him since he is already completely broken and she hugs him as he suffers through a huge heartbreak over Jasmine. Guest stars: Karen Malina White as Betty LeBow, Theodore Barnes as Kevin LeBow, Reed Alvarado as Owen
30	10	"Lindy and Logan's Brrrrthday!"	Erika Kaestle	Jim Gerkin	June 7, 2015	210	2.06
Jasmine, Garrett, and Delia set out to make Lindy and Logan's 16th birthday extra special, but a snowstorm threatens their party plans. Lindy surprises Logan by letting him fill in for the drummer of his favorite band, The Weasels. Logan performs with the band at a night club and meets the drummer. Logan tells Lindy it's been the best birthday ever, because of what she did for him.
31	11	"Cheer Up Girls"	Neal Israel	Jeanette Collins & Mimi Friedman	June 21, 2015	212	1.95
When Lindy, Jasmine, and Delia learn their school refuses to have cheerleaders for the school's girls' sports teams, they take a stand and form a rogue cheer-leading squad of their own. This annoys the cheerleading and pep sponsor, Mrs. Klegg, who feels that cheerleading for girls' teams doesn't follow with tradition, and orders them to stop. After the girls have a meeting with Mrs. Klegg and the school principal, he rules in the girls' favour, allowing them to continue cheering for the girls' teams. Meanwhile, Logan has gotten a new gig as a superhero named Mr. Awesome at kids parties. This leads to a few surprises for Rumble Juice, including a visit by country musician RaeLynn. Garrett even makes up a superhero to be Mr. Awesome's side-kick when Logan performs at a kid's birthday party. Garrett names his superhero Roid Boy, with hilarious results when everyone misinterprets what "Roid" is short for. Special guest star: RaeLynn as herself
32	12	"Lindy in the Middle"	Jon Rosenbaum	Erinne Dobson	July 10, 2015	211	1.79
Lindy tries to be a matchmaker for Garrett and a new girl in school, but she ends up doing all the work with the relationship by sending herself flowers and baking a cake. Meanwhile, Logan and Delia try to work on a science project, but they stall and are unable to get started on it. They seek out Aubrey for help, who gives them advice to do it together, and they end up doing it about snack foods named after famous scientists and the people who went and got snacks for those scientists while they did their scientific research. Guest stars: Zoe Anne Pessin as Aubrey, Anna Grace Barlow as Hayley
33	13	"Elementary, My Dear Watson"	Jean Sagal	Tom Palmer	July 24, 2015	213	1.90
When Betty retired from the Coast Guard, she was given the ship's horn as a going-away gift by her crew. She has installed the horn in Rumble Juice, and instructs Garrett to sound the horn, as well as sing a silly song, every time anyone orders a Banana Boat smoothie, but everyone hates the horn due to its deafeningly-loud volume. Later, Betty's horn is stolen, and Logan becomes the detective, determined to find who stole it. Meanwhile, Lindy has been asked by her Uncle Roy to spend the weekend on his houseboat and babysit his cat while he is away. Lindy asks Delia to accompany her, but Delia declines, as she will be working on an English paper all weekend. Jasmine insists on going, but Lindy is unsure, as Jasmine is a planner, and Lindy feels she won't be spontaneous enough to drop everything and spend the weekend on a houseboat. Jasmine insists that she can be spontaneous enough and convinces Lindy to let her come along, which Jasmine quickly regrets after they arrive. Eventually, Logan discovers that Betty removed the horn herself, as she realized it was a bad idea but hates admitting she is ever wrong so much that she made it look like a theft. Betty ultimately gives the horn to her nephew Kevin, who feels it will look very cool on his bicycle. Guest stars: Karen Malina White as Betty LeBow, Theodore Barnes as Kevin, Rose Abdoo as Margaret
34	14	"Lindy Breaks Garrett"	Bob Koherr	Tom Palmer	August 7, 2015	214	1.77
Lindy finds three passes to a spa in an old drawer which are about to expire, but Jasmine and Delia can't go with her because they have a double-date with Owen and Brandon, so Lindy convinces Logan and Garrett to go with her instead. After their spa visit, Garrett becomes happier and less tense, having received a massage which releases all of his pent-up tension, but Logan hates his new personality, feeling that Garrett has become a completely-different person, and tries to convince Lindy to put him back to the way he was. After Lindy fails, Logan also tries but fails. Garrett eventually goes back to his old self after spending some more time with his mother, who caused all his inner tension in the first place, making Logan very happy. Meanwhile, Jasmine also acts like a completely different person on the double-date, agreeing with everything Owen says to the point of contradicting things she has declared are important to her in the past, which upsets Delia, causing Delia and Brandon to try to avoid Jasmine and Owen at Rumble Juice the next day, but Jasmine catches them and gets angry. Later, Delia asks Jasmine to talk, and Jasmine reveals she's been agreeing with everything Owen says because she wants him to like her. Delia explains that Jasmine just needs to be herself, and Jasmine agrees. A short time later Jasmine tells Owen this, and the news makes him very happy, as he also felt that Jasmine has been acting oddly lately. They decide to just be themselves from now on. Guest stars: Karen Malina White as Betty LeBow, Jonathan McClendon as Brandon, Reel Alvarado as Owen
35	15	"Doggie Daddy"	Bob Koherr	Erika Kaestle & Patrick McCarthy	August 14, 2015	215	1.60
Lindy is taking care of another foster dog, a female known as Lucky. Logan falls in love with Lucky, who appears to like Logan more than Lindy. Lindy is jealous of the greater affection Lucky shows towards Logan. Lindy and Logan compete for Lucky's affection. Meanwhile, Garrett is having a garage sale at his house. Jasmine comes over to visit Garrett with Aubrey. While Garrett is temporarily away from the table, Jasmine accidentally sells Aubrey a vintage action figure for three dollars, misinterpreting the price tag - Garrett was seeking to sell it for its full value of three hundred dollars, as it is a very rare collectible and is still sealed in its original packaging. Later Garrett, thinking it was stolen, asks Jasmine about it and discovers the mistake. Garrett and Jasmine go to Aubrey's house in an attempt to get the action figure back, and Garrett ultimately has to become Aubrey's butler for a day in exchange for Aubrey giving him back his vintage action figure, with hilarious results. In the end, Lucky is revealed as pregnant and gives birth to puppies, making Logan very happy. Guest stars: Karen Malina White as Betty LeBow, Zoe Anne Pessin as Aubrey, Joe Holt as Roland Sparks, Angela Lin as Dr. Doolittle, Tom G. McMahon as Frank
36	16	"Drum Beats, Heart Beats"	Bob Koherr	Phil Baker	September 11, 2015	216	1.72
Jasmine asks Logan for drum lessons, but he instead pictures her asking him to be her boyfriend. Logan says yes to the drum lessons, and they spend a lot of time over them. During one lesson, Jasmine falls off the drum seat, but Logan catches her. Caught up in the moment, Logan leans into Jasmine and they almost kiss for the third time, however their special and romantic moment is ruined when Owen walks in and sees them. Owen becomes suspicious that there may be something going on between the two, which there is, and asks Jasmine about it the next day at school but she denies it. Jasmine, however, has realized she still has feelings for Logan. Meanwhile, Garrett has to train a new employee named Shelley. She acts like she really likes Garrett at first, but later tries to get Garrett in trouble by telling Betty a lie. When Betty confronts Garrett, he explains the truth to her and she believes him, then orders him to fire Shelley. Lindy and Delia have a puppet show for little kids, but end up arguing during it. Lindy and Delia later make up at Lindy's house. Towards the end, Logan asks Jasmine if she is ready for her solo, but she instead pictures him admitting he loves her and that he is the perfect guy for her. This shows that Jasmine does still have strong feelings for him. In the end, Garrett fires Shelley and she leaves. Betty then tells Garrett to clean the bathroom, and he says he fired Shelley one minute too early. Guest stars: Karen Malina White as Betty LeBow, Reed Alvarado as Owen, Allisyn Ashley Arm as Shelley
37	17	"The Doctor Is In"	Erika Kaestle	Jim Gerkin	September 18, 2015	217	1.92
Lindy flirts with a young veterinarian named Dr. Scott Gabriel while having the foster dog she is taking care of receive a checkup. Lindy asks Dr. Gabriel on a date. He accepts the offer and they soon become a romantic couple. Logan starts to hang out with Scott and they become close, which makes Lindy jealous, and Lindy and Logan fight over spending time with Scott. Later, Scott breaks up with Lindy and stops hanging out with Logan due to Lindy and Logan's fighting, which led to his shoulder becoming dislocated. Meanwhile, Garrett is offered a higher-paying job at a fast food place inside the mall. Garrett accepts the new job offer, but later realizes he dislikes his new job and wants his old job back. Betty gives Garrett his old job back after she realizes he is like a family member to her. Also, Jasmine wants to become the Pep Club president, but needs approval from Mrs. Klegg, who is still annoyed at the girls for forming their rogue cheerleading squad and denies her application. Later, Jasmine and Delia confront Mrs. Klegg, revealing that they have learned she isn't really from Texas nor named Mrs. Klegg at all, but is named Mary Ann Norducci and is actually from New Jersey; she admits that she invented the Mrs. Klegg persona and Texas backstory in order to become the school's pep sponsor. The girls agree to keep her secret in exchange for Jasmine being appointed the Pep Club president, which Mrs. Klegg agrees to. Afterwards Delia, who has family in New Jersey, bonds with Mrs. Klegg in her Mary Ann Norducci persona, as they discover that one of Norducci's cousins married one of Delia's cousins; Jasmine, unable to handle their New Jersey enthusiasm, leaves. Special guest star: Bradley Steven Perry as Dr. Scott Gabriel Guest stars: Karen Malina White as Betty LeBow, Patricia Belcher as Candy, Danielle Bisutti as Mrs. Glegg, Theodore Barnes as Kevin, Matthew Bohrer as Tim Thomas
38	18	"Bite Club"	Bob Koherr	Jeanette Collins & Mimi Friedman	October 2, 2015	218	2.07
On the day before Halloween, Lindy and Jasmine are asked if they want to donate blood, but Jasmine is suspicious of the guy asking due to the creepy way he is asking. The next day, both volunteer to donate blood, but Jasmine backs out because she is starting to believe that the guy is a real vampire who wants to drink their blood. Lindy donates, and afterwards Jasmine becomes convinced Lindy is turning into a vampire after seeing what appear to be bite marks on her neck. Lindy pulls a prank on Jasmine, trying to scare her into believing that Lindy really is a vampire. Logan and Delia go to NYC to attend a science convention, where they present their science project on the snack-getters of scientists. Later, in Central Park, they run into Austin & Ally's Trish and Dez. Meanwhile Garrett, dressed in his Roid Boy costume, takes Betty's nephew, Kevin, trick-or-treating on Betty's orders, and at first Kevin dislikes it, because he dislikes Garrett, but Garrett changes Kevin's mind when the two turn trick-or-treating into a candy scam by going to the same generous woman's house multiple times, dressed up as different people each time, to get more candy from her. Later, back at Rumble Juice, they show off their large candy haul, but Betty convinces them to donate their candy to the sick children's hospital. The next day the gang hang out at Rumble Juice and show each other the pictures from their various Halloween adventures. Special guest stars: Raini Rodriguez as Trish, Calum Worthy as Dez Guest stars: Karen Malina White as Betty LeBow, Susan Ruttan as Ada, Theodore Barnes as Kevin, Maggie Wheeler as Ms. Debbie, Adam Grimes as Vlad
39	19	"The Rescuers"	Bob Koherr	Phil Baker	October 16, 2015	219	2.26
Lindy and the gang scramble to book a big musical act in the benefit concert they are throwing to save an animal rescue shelter. Meanwhile, Jasmine finally figures out her feelings for Logan. Lindy and the gang decide to form a band to perform at the concert. Jasmine admits she still has feelings for Logan, so she decides her heart belongs with Logan instead of Owen. Lindy tells Logan that Jasmine still likes him, which he gets really excited about, and since Jasmine is confused about whether she belongs with Logan or Owen, Logan is willing to battle Owen in a duel to win Jasmine's heart. Jasmine breaks up with Owen to be with Logan, but Logan sees the two hugging, unaware they have broken up. Delia decides to break up with Brandon because she thinks they no longer have anything in common, so she hires Garrett to break up with Brandon for her, which he agrees to do for twenty dollars. After the gang has performed, Logan is putting the drum set away and Jasmine offers to help him. Jasmine tells Logan that she has broken up with Owen to be with him, much to Logan's surprise and happiness. Jasmine and Logan finally admit their feelings for each other, Logan finally confesses to Jasmine he loves her, they finally become a couple, and the two share their first kiss, much to Lindy, Delia, Garrett, and Betty's happiness as well as both Jasmine and Logan's happiness since they've both been waiting a very long time to be together - especially Jasmine, because she has finally been given what she's been waiting for - Logan as her boyfriend - which she has wished for a very long time. In the final scene, outside Rumble Juice, the gang comes up with the idea of continuing the band and discusses band names and Jasmine and Logan admit they love each other during the process of doing so. Lindy comes up with the name of "The Rescuers", which Logan, Jasmine, Delia, and Garrett all agree on, and the gang hugs. Guest stars: Karen Malina White as Betty LeBow, Jonathan McClendon as Brandon, Reed Alvarado as Owen, Theodore Barnes as Kevin, Harvey Shield as Keith Edwards, Daryl Critttenden as Colin
