= Jeff Ayars =

American filmmaker

- Born: Media, Pennsylvania, U.S.
- Education: Cornell University and University of Pennsylvania
- Occupations: Filmmaker and actor
- Known for: Cannibal Milkshake
- Notable work: Philadelphia, Ti Amo (2011); An Auteur Is Born (Comedy Central) (2019); This Is Our Home (2019), FBI: International

Jeff Ayars is an American filmmaker and actor known for writing, directing, and performing in the comedy duo Cannibal Milkshake alongside Dan Rosen. He is also known for the film Philadelphia, Ti Amo (2011) starring Rebecca Rittenhouse, his Tribeca Film Festival selection The Snapstory, his acting in FBI: International and his horror features This Is Our Home and Voices Carry. Ayars will soon be seen alongside Melissa Leo in the upcoming feature film Mother Wolf.

== Education ==
Ayars grew up in Media, Pennsylvania, where he attended Penncrest High School and was one of 595 students in the country to receive a national writing award from the NCTE during his senior year. Ayars went on to attend Cornell University from 2008 to 2013, graduating with a Bachelor of Fine Arts. During his time at Cornell, Ayars produced videos for The Cornell Daily Sun and other companies and campus organizations. While on a brief hiatus from Cornell, Ayars studied creative writing at The University of Pennsylvania, where he published a satire of Franz Kafka. Ayars' film and pop-culture thesis was an exploration of personas in film using Ryan Gosling quotations.

== Career ==
As a child, Ayars was in two television commercials for the Philadelphia Phillies in 1993 and 1994. His father, NBC Sports executive and Emmy Award winner Robert Ayars, who at the time worked for the PRISM television network, shot and directed the commercials.

Ayars has gone on to act, produce, direct, edit, and write for various forms of media such as online content, film, television, documentary, short film, and commercial.

Ayars is currently the Head of Video Production at Blackbird, where he directs their talkshow, Take Me To Your Spot, featuring influencers, entertainers, and chefs such as Chris Bianco.

=== Cannibal Milkshake ===
Cannibal Milkshake is a comedy partnership between Jeff Ayars and his Cornell University classmate Dan Rosen. The duo produces, writes, directs, edits, and acts in their videos, and are frequent contributors to The New Yorker. Ayars and Rosen's sketches have also been featured by CollegeHumor, Funny or Die, Comedy Central, Fortune Magazine, and Elizabeth Banks' WhoHaHa network. Their work is largely tech-world satire and movie parodies, notably featuring Ayars performing as a crazed Bradley Cooper, Oscar Awards-hungry Leonardo DiCaprio, finance-bro Ryan Gosling, and James Bond as a stressed-out dad. Ayars and Rosen have also performed live at New York City venues like the Upright Citizens Brigade Theatre and The People's Improv Theater, where Ayars performed live with actor Richard Kind and comedian Judy Gold in 2021.

=== Film ===
Ayars' first short film during college starred Rebecca Rittenhouse and went on to screen at the Philadelphia Film Festival. His work has subsequently been featured at the NYC Web Fest, New York City Independent Film Festival, Manhattan Film Festival, New Filmmakers Los Angeles, Cinequest Film Festival, The Lower East Side Film Festival, and the Tribeca Film Festival.

Ayars produced and starred in the 2019 psychological thriller feature, This Is Our Home. Written by Rob Harmon and directed by long-time friend and collaborator Omri Dorani, the film co-stars Simone Policano and tells the story of a struggling couple on a weekend away that takes a turn with the arrival of a mysterious child. The film was executive produced by former Paramount Pictures executive Inga Vainshtein Smith, known for Hardcore Henry.

The subject of mental health is an important theme in Ayars' work. He was one of 75 creators selected to attend the Kindred Mind Matters mental health summit sponsored by HBO.

Ayars is developing a romantic comedy feature film GOLD BOY that deals with the subject of mental health and is inspired by his own struggles at Cornell University. The film pitch was a finalist in the Yes, And Laughter Lab initiative to combine comedy and social justice sponsored by Comedy Central.

=== Television ===
From 2013 to 2025, Ayars has worked at Comcast NBCUniversal. From 2019 to 2025, he served as a producer for Morning Joe on MSNBC, responsible for field packages and produced behind-the-scenes featurettes on the Curb Your Enthusiasm finale, Oppenheimer, and Severance. He previously worked producing EPKs and promos for NBCUniversal.

In 2022, Ayars made his network television debut as a guest star on Dick Wolf's CBS procedural FBI: International.

Ayars has also starred in national television commercials, including a campaign for the Ad Council. He starred as Thomas Jefferson in the 2022 Super Bowl ad for ClickUp.

== Filmography ==
Year	Title	Type	Director	Writer	Editor	Producer	Executive producer	Actor	Other	Notes
2011	Philadelphia, Ti Amo	Short	Yes	Yes	Yes	Yes	Yes	Yes		As Michael
2013	Christopher Walkenoma	Short	Yes	Yes	Yes	Yes	Yes	Yes		As Jeffrey
2014	MacGuffin	Video short	Yes	Yes	Yes	Yes	Yes	Yes		As Jeffrey the Small-Town-Multi-Billionaire
2015	Pound: The Woof Dawg Story	Short	Yes	Yes	Yes	Yes	Yes	Yes		As Woof Dawg
2016	Two Girls One Show	Digital series	Yes	No	No	No	Yes	Yes		As Sassy bartender
2016	Ghost Friend	TV Pilot	Yes	No	Yes	Yes	Yes	No		
2017	The New Yorker: Shorts & Murmurs	TV series	Yes	Yes	Yes	Yes	Yes	Yes		As Millennial hoarder, Intern Maht, Startup founder
2017	The Notebook Snapstory	Video short	Yes	Yes	Yes	Yes	Yes	Yes		As Ryan Gosling
2017	Assholes		No	No	No	Yes	No	No	associate producer	
2017	NY NY Land	Video short	Yes	Yes	Yes	Yes	Yes	Yes		As Finance Bro Gosling
2018	I, Nancy	Video short	Yes	Yes	Yes	Yes	No	Yes		As Campbell's Soup Director
2018	Masterclass: Marvel CGI Acting	Short	Yes	Yes	Yes	Yes	No	Yes		As Chris Evans
2019	All Hail Beth	TV series	No	No	No	No	No	Yes		As Holden Hans
2019	Final Callback	Short	Yes	Yes	Yes	Yes	Yes	Yes		As angry auditioner
2019	DTF	TV mini series	Yes	No	Yes	Yes	No	No		
2019	This Is Our Home		No	No	No	Yes	No	Yes		As Cory
2019	An Auteur Is Born	Short	Yes	Yes	Yes	No	No	Yes		As Bradley Cooper
2020	Nevertheless	Documentary	No	No	No	Yes	No	No	associate producer	
2021	Actors		No	No	No	Yes	No	No	associate producer	
2021	International Falls		No	No	No	No	Yes	No		
2021	Rifkin on Rifkin: Private Confessions of a Serial Killer	TV special	No	No	No	No	No	Yes		Joel Rifkin
2021	Being George Lucas: A Connor Ratliff Story	Documentary	No	No	No	No	Yes	No	executive producer	post-production
2021	No Dye	Short	No	No	No	Yes	No	Yes		As Pat
2022	FBI: International	TV series	No	No	No	No	No	Yes		As Henry Martin
2019-2022	Morning Joe	TV series	No	No	No	Yes	No	No	field producer	507 episodes
TBD	Imposter Syndrome	Documentary	Yes	Yes	No	Yes	No	No		filming
TBD	The Abaddon Pit		No	No	No	No	No	Yes		As Dave
TBD	Mental Health and Horror: A Documentary	Documentary	No	No	No	Yes	No	No	associate producer	filming
TBD	What Are We?		No	No	No	No	No	Yes		
TBD	Trust	Short	No	No	No	Yes	No	Yes		completed
TBD	Mother Wolf	Independent film	No	No	No	No	No	Yes		
