= Sarah Gilman =

American actress

- Born: Sarah Baldwin Gilman; 18 January 1996 (age 30); Los Angeles, California, U.S.
- Education: University of Southern California
- Occupation: Actress
- Years active: 2011–present

Sarah Baldwin Gilman (born January 18, 1996) is an American actress. She is known for her role as Delia in the Disney Channel series I Didn't Do It.

== Early life and education ==
Gilman was born on January 18, 1996, in Los Angeles where she still resides. She graduated with honors from Flintridge Preparatory School where she also achieved the Advanced Placement Scholar designation. She is athletic and played in a variety of school sports teams including volleyball, water polo, basketball, softball and soccer. She was the only girl in school history to complete the intense training required to play on the boys junior varsity football team. On June 1, 2014, she graduated from high school. Gilman began attending the University of Southern California in the fall of 2014, studying film production, screenwriting, and theater. She graduated with a Bachelor of Arts degree in 2019.

== Career ==
Her first acting jobs were in theatre. She played main roles in musicals like Narnia, You're a Good Man, Charlie Brown and Alice. In 2011, she made her film debut in the short movie Hold for Laughs. She played the lead role as Margaret, a 13-year-old girl who is bullied at a Catholic school. She later guest starred in the TV series Up All Night and Marvin Marvin. Since 2012 she has had a recurring role as Cammy, Eve's best friend in the sitcom Last Man Standing. On June 18, 2013, it was announced that Gilman would play a main role as Delia Delfano in the Disney Channel sitcom I Didn't Do It. The show ended on October 16, 2015.

In 2018, Gilman starred alongside Sarah Jeffery in the comedy mystery film Daphne & Velma directed by Suzi Yoonessi, in which she played the character Velma Dinkley, which premiered at the Chicago Comic & Entertainment Expo (C2E2) on April 7, 2018 and was released on May 22, 2018, by Warner Bros. Home Entertainment. The same year, she appeared on the fourth and final season of the romantic comedy series Foursome, where she played the role of Wynn.

In 2019, Gilman appeared on the third and final season of the TruTV sitcom Those Who Can't, playing Gretchen.

Gilman had a recurring role in CBS crime drama series CSI: Vegas portraying Penny Gill.

== Filmography ==
Year	Film	Role	Notes
2011	Hold for Laughs	Margaret Rose	Short film
2012	Up All Night	Jamie	Episode: "Baby Fever"
2012–2017	Last Man Standing	Cammy Harris	Recurring role, 9 episodes
2013	Marvin Marvin	Hailey	Episode: "Double Date"
2014	Kroll Show	Cardoni's Daughter	Episode: "Sponsored by Stamps"
2014–2015	I Didn't Do It	Delia Delfano	Main role
2015	Jessie	Delia Delfano	Episode: "The Ghostest with the Mostest"
2016	Still Single	Young Chloe Goldmann	Television film
2017	Alexander IRL	Jamie	
2018	Daphne & Velma	Velma Dinkley	Direct to video
2018	Foursome	Wynn	Main role; Season 4
2018	Barely Managing	Sarah	Television film
2019	Ryan Hansen Solves Crimes on Television	Stephanie	Episode: "The Office Party"
2019	Those Who Can't	Gretchen	4 episodes
2021–2024	CSI: Vegas	Penny Gill	Recurring role
TBD	Damsels	Young Chloe Goldmann	Post-production
