= Daphne & Velma =

- DVD cover
- Directed by: Suzi Yoonessi
- Written by: Kyle Mack; Caitlin Meares
- Based on: Characters by Hanna-Barbera Productions
- Produced by: Ashley Tisdale; Jennifer Tisdale; Amy Kim; Jaime Burke; Suzi Yoonessi
- Starring: Sarah Jeffery; Sarah Gilman; Vanessa Marano
- Cinematography: Meena Singh
- Edited by: Kristina Davies
- Music by: Sasha Gordon
- Production companies: Blondie Girl Productions; Lifeboat Productions; Blue Ribbon Content
- Distributed by: Warner Bros. Home Entertainment
- Release dates: April 7, 2018 (C2E2); May 22, 2018 (United States)
- Running time: 75 minutes
- Country: United States
- Language: English

Daphne & Velma is a 2018 American direct-to-video comedy mystery film directed by Suzi Yoonessi. Based on the Scooby-Doo animated franchise, the film features the title characters Daphne Blake and Velma Dinkley. The film is produced by Ashley and Jennifer Tisdale's Blondie Girl Productions along with Blue Ribbon Content. It premiered at the Chicago Comic & Entertainment Expo (C2E2) on April 7, 2018, and was released on DVD, Blu-ray, and Digital HD on May 22, 2018, by Warner Bros. Home Entertainment.

== Plot ==
Daphne Blake is a high school student who has a semi-popular web show discussing the possibility of aliens and supernatural occurrences. Velma Dinkley is Daphne's supportive yet critical online friend, who believes there is a logical explanation for everything. After Velma web chats Daphne following her latest episode, she reveals to Velma that her parents will be moving to Ridge Valley, where Velma currently goes to high school.

After having a perfect morning at home, Daphne embarks on her first day at Ridge Valley High. She quickly meets Carol, her senior advisor, who shows her the school's expansive collection of advanced technology from Bloom Innovative, a famous technology company headed by Tobias Bloom. While on her tour, Daphne runs into Velma, who does not speak to her. Later that afternoon, Daphne sees a student named Spencer walk into an open locker as if he were in a trance.

At home, Daphne's father reveals that he has sheltered Daphne all her life, going to extreme lengths to follow her around everywhere in an attempt to make Daphne's life "perfect". Shocked and frustrated at her father, Daphne vows to do everything on her own without her father's assistance. The next day, Daphne gets into a heated argument with Velma over their science project, which Velma intentionally sabotaged. The argument results in the girls getting sent to the principal's office, who puts them on "the best couch for conflict resolution". The girls put aside their differences, and Velma reveals she was protecting Daphne because she knew of the strange happenings at the school. Daphne and Velma vow to solve the mystery of the disappearing students.

The girls notice Spencer acting unnaturally robotic, and suspect another student named Griffin Griffiths. Griffin's family have a legacy receiving an internship from Bloom Innovative, which Spencer was currently slated to be offered. Daphne and Velma follow Griffin around, but he also goes into the same locker as Spencer and disappears, ruling him out as the suspect.

The girls realize the only way to figure out who is behind the disappearances is for Velma to be in the running to receive the Bloom internship, by placing herself on top the Bloom Bracket, a competitive ranking system designed to grade students on academics and extracurriculars. Mikayla, a mutual friend of Daphne and Velma's, is currently on top of the Bloom Bracket. Daphne attempts to help Velma win the internship, though in the process, they have to sabotage other students to protect them. The plan works, and Velma rises up to second place. However, they are unable to push Mikayla out of the top spot due to her extensive extracurricular involvement and passion for art. As a back-up plan, the girls cut the power to Mikayla's art exhibit, but the plan backfires when they see a cloaked ghost.

Daphne and Velma discover a secret room while trying to escape from the ghost. With the ghost still chasing them, the girls devise a plan to trip the ghost. They find out that the ghost is actually Daphne's father in a bathrobe, who is still following Daphne around. After Daphne responds coldly, her father realizes that Daphne is capable of handling herself, and he was simply frightened for her and wanted to shelter her from the world. Daphne web chats her mother, who is captured by Tobias Bloom. The girls realize Bloom is behind the disappearances, and go to his company headquarters with the help of Daphne's father.

The girls confront Tobias Bloom after sneaking into the headquarters, but discover he is simply a hologram. Daphne and Velma find Carol, who reveals that she created Bloom Innovative and posed as a student at Ridge Valley High. She attempted to use the cover of the company to kidnap students and steal their inventive ideas to get rich and famous. Carol is apprehended by police.

The girls return to the newly reformed school, and reunite with Mikayla and Spencer. Daphne and Velma return home from school to see that their computer screen is hacked by a possibly real phantom, who threatens the girls to stay away. Not frightened by the apparition, the girls vow to investigate the mystery.

== Cast ==
- Sarah Jeffery as Daphne Blake
- Sarah Gilman as Velma Dinkley
- Vanessa Marano as Carol
- Brian Stepanek as Nedley Blake
- Nadine Ellis as Elizabeth Blake
- Arden Myrin as Principal Piper
- Brooks Forester as Tobias Bloom
- Lucius Baston as Mr. Nussbaum
- Courtney Dietz as Mikayla
- Stephen Ruffin as Nathan
- Fray Forde as Ryder
- Evan Castelloe as Griffin Griffiths
- Daniel Salyers as Mike
- Adam Faison as Spencer
- Jessica Goei as Olivia
- Mickie Pollock as Two-Mop Maggie
- Tucker Halbrooks as Skater Guy

== Production ==
On November 28, 2017, it was announced that Daphne & Velma would be released sometime in 2018. The film was announced to be a prequel spin-off of the classic Scooby-Doo franchise, which would focus only on the two female lead characters. Sarah Gilman and Sarah Jeffery were cast as Velma and Daphne, respectively. On March 27, 2018, a release date of May 22, 2018 was set for the film to be released on DVD, Blu-Ray and digital platforms. In an interview with Icon Vs. Icon that took place five days before the release of the film, Sarah Gilman revealed that the movie was filmed in 17 or 18 days. Gilman additionally mentioned that the film was intended to be empowering for women and young girls, stating that "This is a really good film in that it shows two young, strong females who aren't constantly talking about boys or are damsels in distress who are waiting for someone to rescue them. They are proactive and fast-thinking. They are very real characters who are scared at times but find their strength and inner courage to keep moving forward and kind of control their own destiny. I think that's a really important message in the media right now for young females because, historically, we haven't seen much of it. I'm hoping that is the message that anyone can take away from this film!"

== Reception ==
=== Critical response ===
Danielle Solzman of Solzy At The Movies positively reviewed the film, praising it for its acting and message of female empowerment. Solzman states "The film could not come at a better time for women. Even though new stories are being told, the script stays true to the history...Sarah Gilman is absolutely astonishing in her approach to Velma Dinkley. The actress takes what we love about the character and makes it her own. It ought to be a performance that fans will come to enjoy as the franchise goes in this new direction".

Andrews Shearer of the Augusta Chronicle additionally praised the strong female characters in the film. "By not including the other members of Mystery Incorporated, Daphne & Velma breaks out of the decades-old template viewers are used to (not a single reference to the male characters in the franchise is made) and forges its own refreshing path, owing more to indie flicks like Ghost World than the source material. Unlike the previous two theatrical Scooby-Doo films that aimed to be as faithful to the classic cartoons as possible, Daphne & Velma puts the focus on empowered female relationships and images of women in technology, effectively dismantling nearly every trope of high school movies along the way".

Renee Schonfeld of Common Sense Media panned the film, giving it two stars out of five. Schonfeld derides the spin-off, stating despite the fact that, "The Two Sarahs (Jeffery and Gilman) as Daphne and Velma give it their all... a routine story, cheesy effects, and subpar writing let them down".
