= Reach Nationals =

American nonprofit organization for student creators

REACH Nationals
- Reach Nationals Corp.
- Founded: 2023 (national organization) (Note: The original USC chapter was founded in 2017.)
- Founder: Dylan Huey (national organization)
- Type: 501(c)(3) nonprofit
- Legal status: Active
- Purpose: Collegiate creator-economy education and chapter network
- Headquarters: Los Angeles, California, United States
- Chief executive officer: Dylan Huey
- Website: reachnationals.org

REACH Nationals is an American 501(c)(3) nonprofit organization that operates a network of student-led chapters focused on the creator economy. It was formed in 2023 as the national parent organization of USC Reach, a student creator club founded at the University of Southern California in 2017. Headquartered in Los Angeles, California, the organization had grown to more than 150 chapters at colleges and universities across 20 U.S. states by 2026, training student members in content creation, influencer marketing, and creator-economy career paths.

== History ==
REACH originated as USC Reach, a student organization at the University of Southern California focused on social media and the business of content creation. The club was founded in 2017 by a group of USC students including Markian Benhamou and Xavier Di Petta. It received early media attention for training student influencers, and by 2021 had begun expanding beyond USC to additional universities.

Dylan Huey joined USC Reach in 2020 and became the club's president in 2022. In 2023, Huey founded REACH Nationals as the club's national parent organization, which formally incorporated as Reach Nationals Corp., a California nonprofit public benefit corporation. The organization expanded into a national chapter network, including chapters at the University of California, Los Angeles, the University of Michigan, and the University of Pennsylvania. According to The Hollywood Reporter, by 2026 the network comprised more than 150 chapters across 20 states, with the founding USC chapter remaining its flagship.

REACH Nationals has been covered in national and trade media as part of the emerging field of "influencer studies" at American universities.

== Structure ==
REACH Nationals operates as a chapter-based organization, with each chapter functioning as an officially recognized student organization on its respective university campus. Chapters are led by student executive boards and operate under standards set by the national organization.

Members of REACH chapters include on-camera creators, filmmakers, editors, marketers, and students pursuing careers in the creator economy. Admission to the USC chapter is selective; The Hollywood Reporter reported in 2026 that the chapter received more than 100 applications per semester for roughly 20 to 30 places, with applicants completing timed content-creation exercises as part of the selection process.

== Activities ==
Reported chapter activities have included workshops on contracts and brand deals, on-campus brand activations, content production, and connections to creator-economy internships. Chapters have also hosted workshops and office visits with technology and media companies, including YouTube, Netflix, and Snapchat, and members have produced sponsored content for consumer brands.

== Notable members ==
Past members of REACH chapters include Alan Chikin Chow, a digital creator whose YouTube channel had passed 100 million subscribers by 2026, sports and lifestyle content creator Katie Feeney, who joined ESPN in 2025, and personal-finance content creator Casper Opala.

== Reception ==
REACH Nationals has been profiled in national and trade media including Good Morning America, The Hollywood Reporter, NBC News, Business Insider, The Information, and Tubefilter, as well as university-affiliated publications including Daily Trojan, Daily Bruin, and USC Annenberg Media. In July 2026, The Hollywood Reporter published a feature examining the organization and its USC chapter in the context of the growth of creator-economy programs and clubs at American universities.

== See also ==
- Creator economy
- Influencer marketing
- Student organization
