= Mother Wolf =

American drama film

- Directed by: Suzi Yoonessi
- Screenplay by: Spencer Crossland; Suzi Yoonessi
- Produced by: Melissa Leo
- Starring: Melissa Leo; Matt Walsh; Arian Moayed; Kat Cunning; Mary Stuart Masterson
- Country: United States
- Language: English

Mother Wolf is an upcoming independent American film directed by Suzi Yoonessi and starring Melissa Leo.

== Premise ==
A retired grandmother must take in her grandchildren.

== Cast ==
- Melissa Leo
- Matt Walsh
- Arian Moayed
- Kat Cunning
- Mary Stuart Masterson
- Jeff Ayars

== Production ==
Suzi Yoonessi wrote the feature film with Spencer Crossland, and also directs. The cast is led by Melissa Leo, and also includes Matt Walsh, Arian Moayed, Kat Cunning and Mary Stuart Masterson. Leo is also a producer.

Principal photography took place in Hudson Valley in New York State in August 2024. In October 2024 the film was in post-production, supported by The Mediapro Studio.
