= Dear Lemon Lima =

- Directed by: Suzi Yoonessi
- Written by: Suzi Yoonessi
- Produced by: Melissa Lee; Jonako Donley
- Starring: Savanah Wiltfong; Shayne Topp; Zane Huett; Melissa Leo; Beth Grant; Elaine Hendrix; Meaghan Martin
- Cinematography: Sarah Levy
- Music by: Sasha Gordon
- Production company: Garden of Eden Entertainment
- Distributed by: Phase 4 Films
- Release date: June 2009 (LAFF)
- Running time: 87 minutes
- Country: United States
- Language: English

Dear Lemon Lima is a 2009 family comedy feature film written and directed by Suzi Yoonessi. Based on her short film of the same name and developed with the support of Film Independent and its Filmmaker Labs, the film is about a 13-year-old half-Yup’ik girl navigating her way through her first heartbreak and the perils of prep school in Fairbanks, Alaska. In learning the meanings of love, friendship, and community, Vanessa Lemor finds her voice by embracing her heritage and reclaiming the spirit of the World Eskimo Indian Olympics (WEIO) at a private school where her narcissistic sweetheart's family is legendary.

== Plot ==
Vanessa Lemor, a lonely 13-year-old Yup’ik girl with a vivid imagination, is dumped by her true love, über intellectual Philip Georgey, 14. Vanessa spends the summer in Fairbanks, Alaska, working at an ice cream shack and obsessing over the heartbreaking tragedy. After numerous unsuccessful attempts at erasing fond memories, she resolves to win Philip back at Nichols Academy (named after Yoonessi's alma mater, Nichols School), a close-minded preparatory school where the Georgey family is legendary.

Awarded the only minority scholarship, Vanessa's new life is a nightmare. Back from the summer abroad and fluent in French, Philip is elevated to popular status, while Vanessa is relegated to the bottom of the prep school caste system with the rest of the FUBARs. Rounding out the rest of the FUBARs are Hercules, a loveable but socially inept boy with wildly overprotective parents, Samantha, a 14-year-old who claims her father is a rapper, and Nothing (formally known as Madeline), whose family owns a funeral parlor. Vanessa's consolation prize is Philip's decision to honor Vanessa by being her student advisor. Philip, wishing the best for his pupil, reinstates the values that once brought them together – the pursuit of individuality and embracing of a social consciousness: an alternative lifestyle for a better world. Unfortunately, Vanessa misinterprets his preaching, and alienates herself by presenting an anarchist essay at the opening school ceremony. To make matters worse, she is the only freshman captain selected for the school's infamous Snowstorm Survivor competition, an event inspired by the Native events in the World Eskimo Indian Olympics.

Vanessa believes that a victory in the Snowstorm Survivor championship is the only way into Philip's heart. She quickly forms a quirky team with her fan base in the weight room. Team FUBAR prepares for the event, driven by Vanessa's plight for her true love. Unlike the Native Olympics that brings together people of all sizes and shapes to celebrate Native Alaskan culture, Nichols's Snowstorm Survivor simply perverts the traditional Eskimo games in order to foster an antiquated class system.

After the tragic loss of a beloved teammate, Vanessa discovers the true meaning of love and must embrace her Native heritage to reclaim the spirit of the World Eskimo Indian Olympics.

== Release ==
Dear Lemon Lima premiered on June 20, 2009 at the Los Angeles Film Festival and was released theatrically on March 4, 2011. Actor Shayne Topp won the LAFF award for "Outstanding Performance" in the Narrative competition for his performance in the film. In bestowing Topp with Outstanding Performance recognition, the Jury stated: "For his sophisticated and nuanced comic performance in a role that is often played in less subtle ways by more experienced actors, the award goes to Shayne Topp from Dear Lemon Lima." Dear Lemon Lima received the Audience Award for Best Narrative Feature at its U.S. East Coast premiere at the Woodstock Film Festival and premiered internationally at the Rome International Film Festival. Dear Lemon Lima is distributed by Phase 4 Films and by HBO/Cinemax in Eastern Europe.

== Production ==
The film was shot in Seattle and the surrounding areas.

== Cast ==
- Savanah Wiltfong as Vanessa Lemor
- Shayne Topp as Philip Georgey
- Zane Huett as Hercules Howard
- Melissa Leo as Mrs. Howard
- Maia Lee as Madeline "Nothing" Amigone
- Beth Grant as Principal Applebomb
- Elaine Hendrix as Coach Roach
- Eleanor Hutchins as Terri Lemor
- Meaghan Martin as Megan Kennedy
- Kari Nissena as Norma
- Vanessa Marano as Samantha Combs
- Jada Morrison as Emmaline Chin
- Taylor Finlon as Lynne Chin
- Chase Wright Vanek as Jon Mongory
- Emma Noelle Roberts as Kellie
- Dusty Sager as David

== Reception ==
The movie has received generally positive reviews from critics and audiences. Rotten Tomatoes reports that 75% of 12 critics gave the film a positive review; the average rating is 6.9/10.
