= Suzi Yoonessi =

American filmmaker

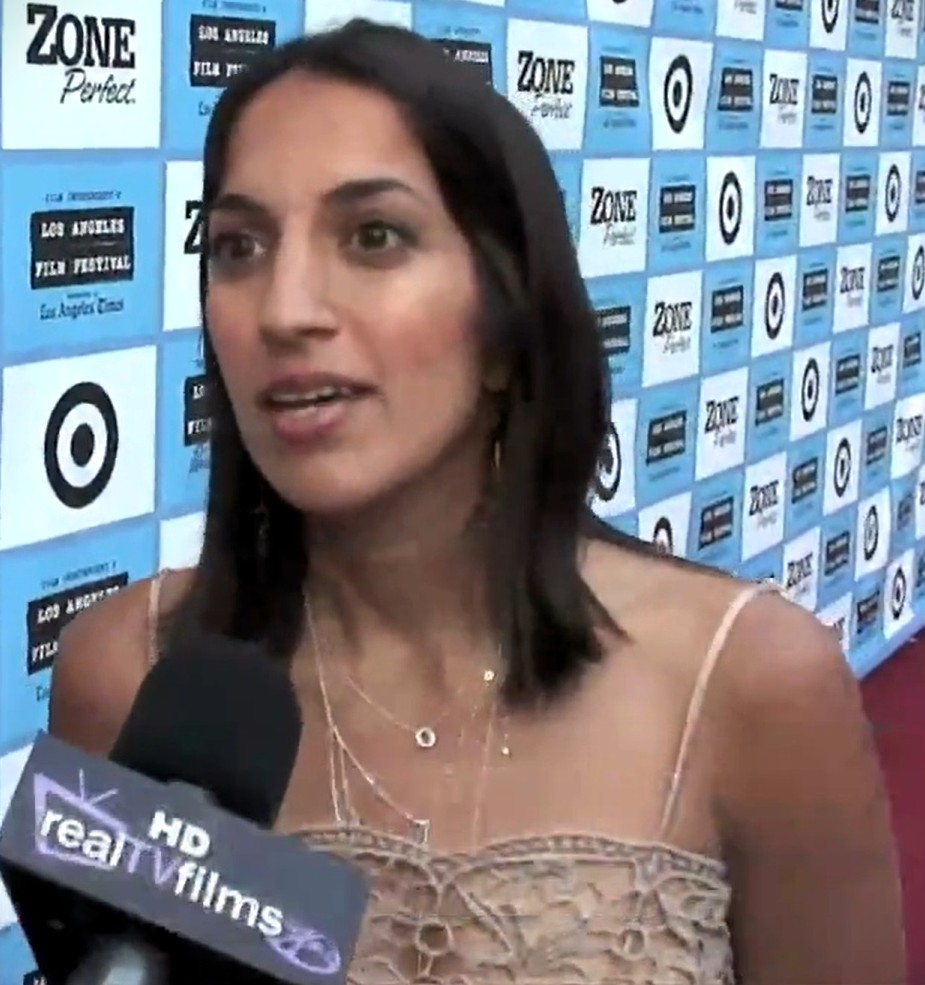
- Yoonessi in 2009
- Born: February 21, 1978 (age 48); Buffalo, New York, U.S.
- Education: San Francisco Art Institute; Columbia University School of the Arts (MFA)
- Occupations: Director; Producer; Screenwriter
- Years active: 2001–present

Suzi Yoonessi (born February 21, 1978) is an American filmmaker. She wrote and directed the award-winning feature film Dear Lemon Lima, and directed the Duplass Brothers film Unlovable and Daphne and Velma for Warner Brothers. Yoonessi's short films No Shoulder and Dear Lemon Lima are distributed by Shorts International and Vanguard Cinema and her documentary film Vern is distributed by National Film Network and is in the permanent collection of the San Francisco Museum of Modern Art.

== Biography ==
Suzi Yoonessi was born in Buffalo, New York, where she attended Nichols School. Yoonessi was a member of Buffalo's first all-female band Bertha Mason during the Riot Grrrl movement in the early 90s. Yoonessi studied photography and film at the San Francisco Art Institute. Upon graduation, she worked for Surface Magazine in the editorial department and moved to New York to pursue filmmaking after being awarded a Jerome Foundation grant for her documentary film Vern. Yoonessi received her MFA from Columbia University School of the Arts where she was the recipient of the FMI Directing Fellowship. She currently resides in Los Angeles and is a director at Walt Disney Animation Studios.

== Directing ==
Suzi Yoonessi's first feature film Dear Lemon Lima premiered at the Los Angeles Film Festival where it received critical acclaim and a jury prize for Outstanding Performance. The film went on to play in over 80 film festivals, picking up audience awards and a grand jury prize at the San Francisco International Asian American Film Festival. The film was released internationally, then domestically on VOD and in theaters in Los Angeles and New York by Phase 4 Films. Yoonessi's sophomore film Unlovable received a special jury recognition at the SXSW Film Festival, and was released by Orion Classics. Yoonessi directed The Spring of Sorrow for the Independent Television Service series FutureStates and the hit series The Dead Girls Detective Agency for Snap Originals. In October 2019, it was announced that Yoonessi is developing an original film with Walt Disney Animation Studios as making first Persian (Iranian) princess as musical animated film, as She listen her grandmother's Iranian fairytale story.

Principal photography on her film Mother Wolf, starring Melissa Leo, took place in Hudson Valley in New York State in August 2024.

== Awards ==
- 2018 Emmy Nomination Outstanding Directing
- 2018 Special Jury Recognition SXSW Film Festival
- 2017 Sun Valley Film Lab Award Winner
- 2014 Funny or Die's 1st Annual Make Em' LAFF Award - Los Angeles Film Festival
- 2010 Camério Irvin Pelletier Humanitas - Festival International de Cinema Jeunesse de Rimouski
- 2010 Camério Hydro-Québec - Festival International de Cinema Jeunesse de Rimouski
- 2010 Miloš Macourek Award - Film Festival Zlín
- 2009 Audience Award - Woodstock Film Festival
- 2009 Audience Award - Anchorage International Film Festival
- 2009 Emerging Star Award (Savanah Wiltfong) - Anchorage International Film Festival
- 2009 Spirit of Independence - Fort Lauderdale International Film Festival
- 2009 Finalist, Bandeira Paulista - São Paulo International Film Festival
- 2009 Grand Jury Prize - San Francisco International Asian American Film Festival
- 2009 Outstanding Performance (Shayne Topp) - Los Angeles Film Festival
- 2008 Tribeca All Access On Track Grant
- 2008 Film Independent Kodak Grant
- 2007 National Geographic All Roads Film Grant
- 2006 Jerome Foundation NYC Media Arts Grant
- 2002 Jerome Foundation NYC Media Arts Grant

== Filmography ==
=== Director ===
- 2027 Untitled first Persian (Iranian) Disney Princess Musical Film
- 2019 Insatiable
- 2018 The Dead Girls Detective Agency
- 2018 Unlovable
- 2018 Daphne and Velma
- 2017 Relationship Status
- 2015 Olive and Mocha: First Kiss
- 2015 Troop Hood
- 2015 Gortimer Gibbon's Life on Normal Street - Gortimer and the Lost Treasure of Normal Street
- 2011 Olive and Mocha: Fast Times at Sugar High
- 2010 The Spring of Sorrow
- 2009 Dear Lemon Lima
- 2006 Dear Lemon Lima short
- 2005 No Shoulder
- 2004 Vern

=== Producer ===
- 2005 Me and You and Everyone We Know (Associate Producer)
- 2004 Vern
- 2001 3 Weeks After Paradise
