= I Didn't Do It (TV series) =

American television series

- Genre: Comedy
- Created by: Josh Silverstein & Tod Himmel
- Starring: Olivia Holt; Austin North; Piper Curda; Peyton Clark; Sarah Gilman
- Opening theme: "Time of Our Lives" by Olivia Holt
- Country of origin: United States
- Original language: English
- No. of seasons: 2
- No. of episodes: 39 (list of episodes)

Production
- Executive producers: Judd Pillot; Tod Himmel; Phil Baker
- Producers: Leo Clarke; Jay Kleckner
- Cinematography: Gary W. Scott; John Simmons
- Camera setup: Multi-camera
- Running time: 22–24 minutes
- Production companies: It's a Laugh Productions; That's Not So Funny Productions

Original release
- Network: Disney Channel
- Release: January 17, 2014 – October 16, 2015

I Didn't Do It is an American comedy television series that premiered on Disney Channel on January 17, 2014, and ended on October 16, 2015. The series was created by Josh Silverstein and Tod Himmel, and stars Olivia Holt, Austin North, Piper Curda, Peyton Clark, and Sarah Gilman.

== Plot ==
The series follows brother-sister twins Lindy and Logan Watson, and their three best friends, Jasmine, Garrett, and Delia, as they begin their freshman year of high school at Ditka High. Each episode in the first season began with a comedic "what just happened" situation, followed by the story being told in flashbacks. This concept was abandoned in the second season.

== Episodes ==
Season	Episodes	Originally released	
Season	Episodes	First released	Last released
1	20	January 17, 2014	December 7, 2014
2	19	February 15, 2015	October 16, 2015

== Cast and characters ==
=== Main ===
The main characters, from left: Delia Delfano, Logan Watson, Lindy Watson, Garrett Spenger, and Jasmine Kang.

- Olivia Holt as Lindy Watson, a teenager who grew up geeky, nerdy, an outcast, and athletic. She walks into high school with a brand new look with her best friend, who shows her how to be fashionable, branching out and becoming a new girl. In "Dance Fever", her nemesis is shown to be a girl named Sherri (Peyton List) and it also shows that she has had perfect attendance for eight years without missing school. In "Snow Problem", it is revealed that Lindy is a good snowboarder. Lindy can be a goody-two-shoes and is sometimes used as a stamp of approval by her friends when they ask their parents if they can go places. In the episode "Fireman Freddy's Spaghetti Station", it is shown she likes to one-up people, though at first, she denies it.
- Austin North as Logan Watson, a teenager who is very laid back, cool, chill, and confident and has big plans on making his mark in high school. However, those plans sometimes collide with his twin sister, Lindy. Logan often tries to take the easy way out of things and is also not the most intelligent or dedicated student. Jasmine has feelings for Logan, which he found out about in "Logan Finds Out!". It was also revealed in "Falling for... Who?" that Logan returns Jasmine's feelings and instantly falls in love with her. Logan also tried to ask Jasmine out, but it was too late because she had started dating Owen. It was also shown that, despite Logan's behavior, he is really sensitive at heart, considering he cried a little over Jasmine when she started dating Owen. Eventually, Logan and Jasmine admit their feelings for each other and become a couple in "The Rescuers". Jasmine and Logan end up together after she chooses him over Owen.
- Piper Curda as Jasmine Kang, a smart, daring, and fashion-forward teenager. She is also always supportive of her four best friends. A fashionista since third grade, Jasmine thrives on good grades, pulling off daring pranks and having the perfect outfit for every occasion. In "Lindy Nose Best", Jasmine developed feelings for Logan and almost admitted her feelings to Logan before he told her that he was going to the movies with Jenna. In "Slumber Partay!", she continued to focus on her crush on Logan when it was her turn to talk about boys. Jasmine is shown to be very sensitive at heart, considering she almost cried over Logan when he got back together with Erin in "Logan Finds Out!" It was also revealed that Jasmine has liked Logan for about a year. Eventually, Logan and Jasmine admit their feelings for each other and become a couple in "The Rescuers". Jasmine and Logan end up together after she chooses him over Owen.
- Peyton Clark as Garrett Spenger, a teenager who can be obsessive about the most obscure details. His affinity for cleanliness and order constantly gets pushed to its limits by his four friends. In "Dear High School Self", it was shown that Garrett is bad at puzzles. In "If It Tastes Like a Brussels Sprout", he doesn't use public toilets. In "Now Museum, Now You Don't", it was revealed that he has a habit of biting his nails. While Garrett tends to take things a bit too far to get to the bottom of hoaxes, he's usually right.
- Sarah Gilman as Delia Delfano, a quirky, eccentric person. She does not consider herself to be in the cool crowd at school and makes fun of people like the cheerleaders, who are always so bright and spirited. She is very outspoken, and if there is something that shouldn't be said out loud, Delia has probably already blurted it out, much to her secret delight.

=== Recurring ===
- Karen Malina White as Betty LeBow (season 2), the owner of Rumble Juice, where the group hangs out. Garrett also works for her.
- Theodore Barnes as Kevin LeBow (season 2), Betty's nephew.
- Reed Alvarado as Owen (season 2), Jasmine's ex-boyfriend. In "The Rescuers" Jasmine breaks up with him to be with Logan.

== Production ==
A pilot for the series was announced November 2012 with production of the pilot scheduled for January 2013. The series was picked up on June 18, 2013. The series started airing on January 17, 2014. On July 3, 2014, Disney ordered a second season of the series. The second season premiered on February 15, 2015. The series ended on October 16, 2015.

== Broadcast ==
The series premiered on Disney Channel in Australia and New Zealand on April 7, 2014. The series premiered on Disney Channel and Disney La Chaîne in French in Canada on September 1, 2015.

== Ratings ==
Viewership and ratings per season of I Didn't Do It
Season	Episodes	First aired		Last aired		Avg. viewers (millions)
Season	Episodes	Date	Viewers (millions)	Date	Viewers (millions)	Avg. viewers (millions)
1	20	January 17, 2014	3.89	December 7, 2014	2.05	2.24
2	19	February 15, 2015	2.46	October 16, 2015	2.26	1.91
