= Alan Chikin Chow =

American YouTuber (born 1998)

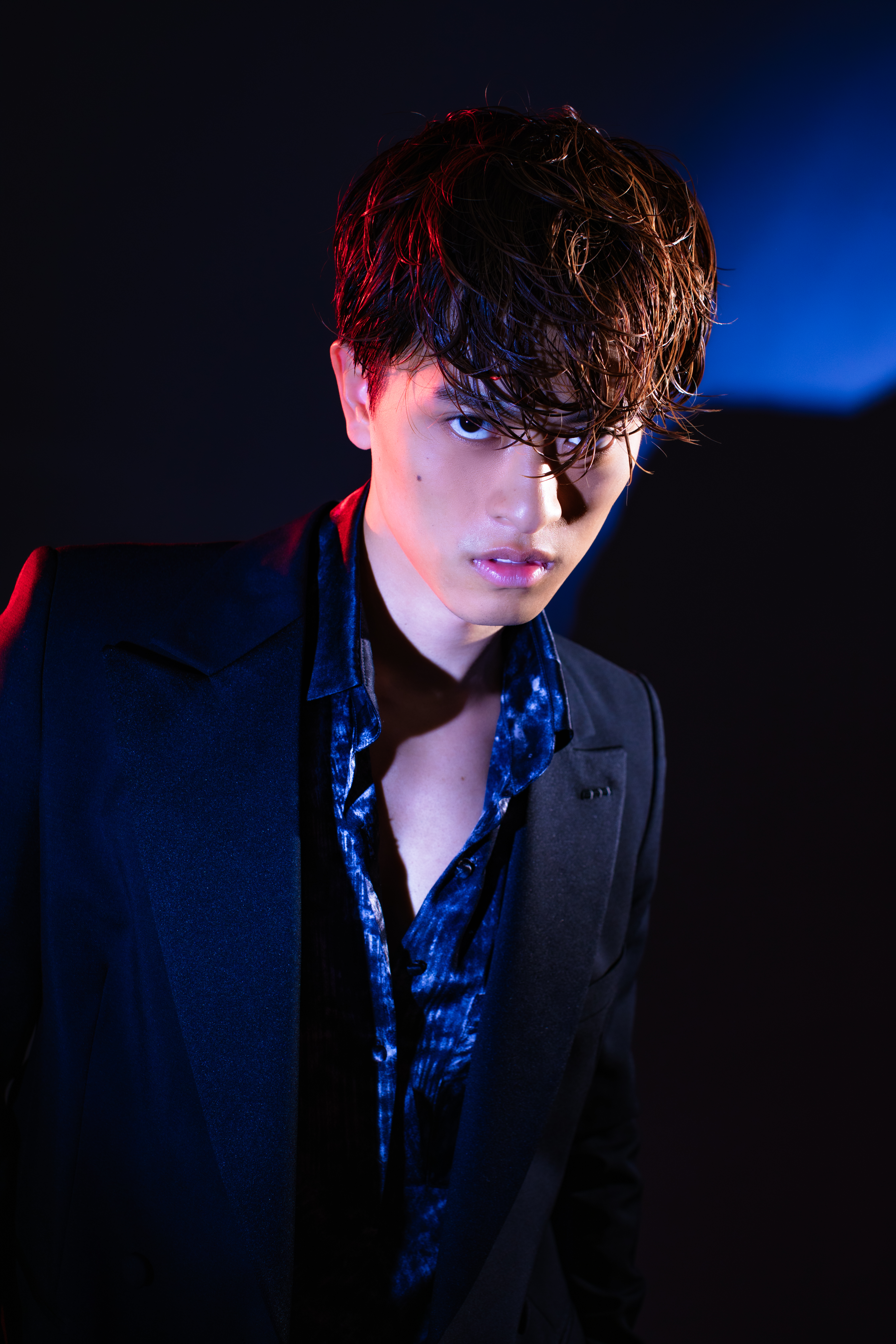
- Chow in 2023
- Born: November 15, 1998 (age 27); Dallas, Texas, U.S.
- Occupations: Actor; Writer; Producer; YouTuber; comedian

YouTube information
- Channel: AlanChikinChow
- Genre: Comedy
- Subscribers: 103.7 Million
- Views: 65.1 Billion
- Last updated: Nov 6, 2026

Alan Chikin Chow (born November 15, 1998) is an American actor, digital creator, producer, writer, and influencer. He is the highest-ranking YouTube shorts creator with over 103 million subscribers and the creator of the YouTube series Alan's Universe. As of May 2025, he has the 17th most subscribed channel on YouTube, placing him in the top 50 most-subscribed YouTube channels and among the most viewed YouTube channels in the world. Chow has appeared in TV series and films that include Grey's Anatomy, Mean Girls, I Didn't Do It, and Into the Dark.

Alan has been ranked in multiple top creator lists, including Forbes Top Creators, Forbes 30 Under 30, and TIME100 Creators. YouTube CEO Neal Mohan has referred to his impact as a “powerful symbol of the broader shift happening in the entertainment industry”.

Bloomberg has described Alan’s content as having the “DNA in classic American tween series such as Boy Meets World, a coming-of-age ’90s sitcom [and] the South Korean high school drama Boys Over Flowers” and compares it to the Disney Channel or Nickelodeon of the new age.

== Early life ==
Alan was born and raised in Plano, Texas. His father is an engineer at NASA and his mother is the owner of a preschool. His brother Alvan Chow is an investor and a cast-member of the Netflix documentary Eat the Rich.

Alan earned his Bachelors Degree from USC studying screenwriting and business administration. His career in content creation also started during his time at USC as a way to make his family laugh.

== Career ==
Chow began as a model for JC Penney, then booked acting roles on I Didn’t Do It, Grey’s Anatomy, and Into the Dark. He also voiced characters in anime series including One Piece.

He started uploading YouTube videos, quickly becoming the most-watched Shorts creator in the United States.

Chow launched Alan’s Universe, a high-school drama about love and friendship, which has over 1 billion views and has been featured on Good Morning America and CBS News.

In 2024, his channel entered YouTube’s global Top 50. He signed with CAA and opened a 10,000 square-foot production studio in Burbank, California, which was attended by YouTube CEO Neal Mohan. Alan’s Universe was also made available on Roku TV, Amazon Prime Video and Tubi.

In 2025, he announced a joint venture with HYBE Corporation to create and star in a new pop group and streaming series. Alan serves as executive producer and star for HYBE AMERICA x AU alongside Scooter Braun and James Shin.

In August 2025, he premiered a vertical drama series titled Beauty and the Beat sponsored by the skincare company Laneige in partnership with e-commerce company Superordinary. The series garnered over 200M views across its 25 vertical episodes.

In 2026, Netflix picked up Alan and HYBE America’s scripted k-pop TV series. Jingu Jang, former Vice President of BIGHIT Music, joined the project as an executive producer. The series is described to follow a misfit crew of aspiring pop idols enrolled in an arts academy who come together to form a co-ed band.

In July 2026, Alan’s Universe was also picked up to Netflix. Under the collaboration, the Alan’s Universe library will be available on the platform, with future episodes airing on YouTube and Netflix simultaneously.

== Filmography ==
=== Feature films and television ===
Year	Title	Role
2014	I Didn't Do It	DeeJay
2014	One Piece	Orenami (voice)
2014	Soul Eater Not	Voice
2014	Ping Pong the Animation	Kong "Chine" Wenge (voice)
2015	Absolute Duo	Ethnarch
2016	Internet Famous	Prank-A-Lank
2017	Tales of Titans	Pissbaby
2018	Grey's Anatomy	Henry
2018	13 Reasons Why	Mikey Chan
2018	Mr. Student Body President	Brandon Wu
2018	Millenial Mafia	Sal Dang
2018	The Thinning: New World Order	Ryland
2020	Into the Dark	Trevor
2022	Home Economics	Male Host
2022	The Casagrandes	Han (voice)
2024	Mean Girls	Social Media Friend (as himself)
2024	Afraid	Himself

== Philanthropy ==
He works with Act to Change, a non-profit against bullying for AAPI youth. He donated to the organization during TikTok's #GivingSzn.

== Awards and recognition ==
Ceremony	Year	Category	Ref.
Fortune Magazine	2023	#1 YouTube Shorts Creator	
YouTube Newfronts	2023	#1 YouTube Shorts Creator	
Forbes Top Creators	2023	Honoree	
Forbes Top Creators	2024	Honoree	
Forbes 30 Under 30	2024	Honoree	
Rolling Stones Top 25 Most Influential Creators	2024	Honoree	
The Hollywood Reporter Creator Class	2024	Honoree	
Gold House A100 List	2024	Honoree	
The Webby Awards	2024	Best Creator; Best Use of Video; Arts & Entertainment (Social)	
Forbes Top Creators	2025	Honoree	
Time100 Creators	2025	Honoree	
Mashable 101 Top Creators	2025	Honoree	
Forbes Top Creators	2026	Honoree	
Time100 Creators	2026	Honoree	
Mashable 101 Top Creators	2026	Honoree	
