= ClickUp =

Project management software

- Type: Private
- Industry: Project management software
- Founded: 2017
- Founder: Zeb Evans (CEO); Alex Yurkowski (CTO)
- Headquarters: 350 Tenth Avenue, San Diego, California, U.S.
- Website: clickup.com

ClickUp is a project management software company that provides an all-in-one platform to improve workplace efficiency and collaboration. The platform's features include tasks, chat, whiteboards, spreadsheets, and document collaboration on a unified platform. It was founded by Zeb Evans and Alex Yurkowski in 2017.

== History ==
ClickUp was founded by Alex Yurkowski and Zeb Evans in 2017. The original intent was to use it as an internal tool before being released publicly. The company relocated its headquarters to San Diego, California, in January 2020.

ClickUp raised $35 million in Series A funding in June 2020. This was followed by $100 million in Series B funding in December of the same year. The company was valued at over $1 billion. In October 2021, ClickUp secured $400 million in Series C funding, reaching an estimated valuation of $4 billion.

In 2021 the company expanded internationally by opening offices in Dublin, Ireland, and Sydney, Australia. In 2022, ClickUp acquired the productivity search tool Slapdash. In July 2023, the company announced workforce reductions of approximately 10 percent. In May 2026, the company announced further layoffs of 22 percent.

== Product ==
ClickUp provides a suite for productivity and collaboration tools within a single platform. The software supports task and project management through customizable workflows, statuses, and multiple visualizations including list, board, calendar, and Gantt chart views.

The platform includes document collaboration features (known as Docs), which allow real-time editing and task linking, and Whiteboards, which provide a space for brainstorming and planning.

Communication tools are built into the platform, including task-based comments, notifications, and integrated chat. In September 2024, ClickUp added ClickUp Chat, an AI-assisted messaging tool that integrates with task creation and management.

Automation features allow users to set recurring actions, dependencies, and triggers to streamline workflows. ClickUp also provides integrations with third-party applications such as Slack, Google Drive, and GitHub.

In 2023, the company introduced ClickUp AI, a feature designed to assist with summarization, content generation, and task automation. This was rebranded as ClickUp Brain in early 2024.

In December 2025, ClickUp acquired the AI coding platform Codegen. The acquisition was announced on December 23, 2025, with financial terms undisclosed. Codegen develops agentic AI technology capable of autonomously generating software and completing development tasks. Following the acquisition, Codegen's founder and CEO Jay Hack joined ClickUp as Head of AI. The technology is expected to power ClickUp's "Super Agents," AI teammates designed to execute tasks and build software directly within the ClickUp workspace. The standalone Codegen service is scheduled to be discontinued on January 16, 2026, as its capabilities are integrated into the ClickUp platform.

=== Operations ===
In April 2022, ClickUp acquired SlapDash, the developer of a unified search tool for enterprise applications.

Also in 2022, ClickUp unveiled a Whiteboard feature, a visual tool for hybrid work environments. ClickUp AI was launched in February 2023, allowing users to summarize and generate content - this was renamed ClickUp Brain in January 2024.

In September 2024, ClickUp unveiled ClickUp Chat, featuring AI-enhanced communication capabilities that streamline task creation and message management directly within its project management platform.
