= Chicago Comic & Entertainment Expo =

Multi-genre fan convention in the United States

Coordinates: 41°51′07″N 87°36′58″W

- Status: Active
- Genre: Speculative fiction
- Venue: McCormick Place
- Locations: Chicago, Illinois
- Country: United States
- Inaugurated: April 16, 2010; 16 years ago
- Most recent: March 27, 2026; 7 months ago
- Next event: April 30, 2027; 5 months' time
- Attendance: >100,000 (2025)
- Organizer: RX, a division of RELX
- Filing status: For-profit
- Website: www.c2e2.com

The Chicago Comic & Entertainment Expo (C2E2) is a fan convention dedicated to comics, pop culture, graphic novels, anime, manga, video games, toys, movies, and television held annually in Chicago. The inaugural event was held April 16–18, 2010, at the McCormick Place in Chicago.

== History ==
C2E2 was held for the first time April 16–18, 2010, with an estimated attendance between 20,000 and 30,000 attendees. The convention included dozens of professional and amateur comic book artists, and prominently featured booths from the biggest comic book publishers. The convention also featured a special auction with the actual props from the original Iron Man movie.

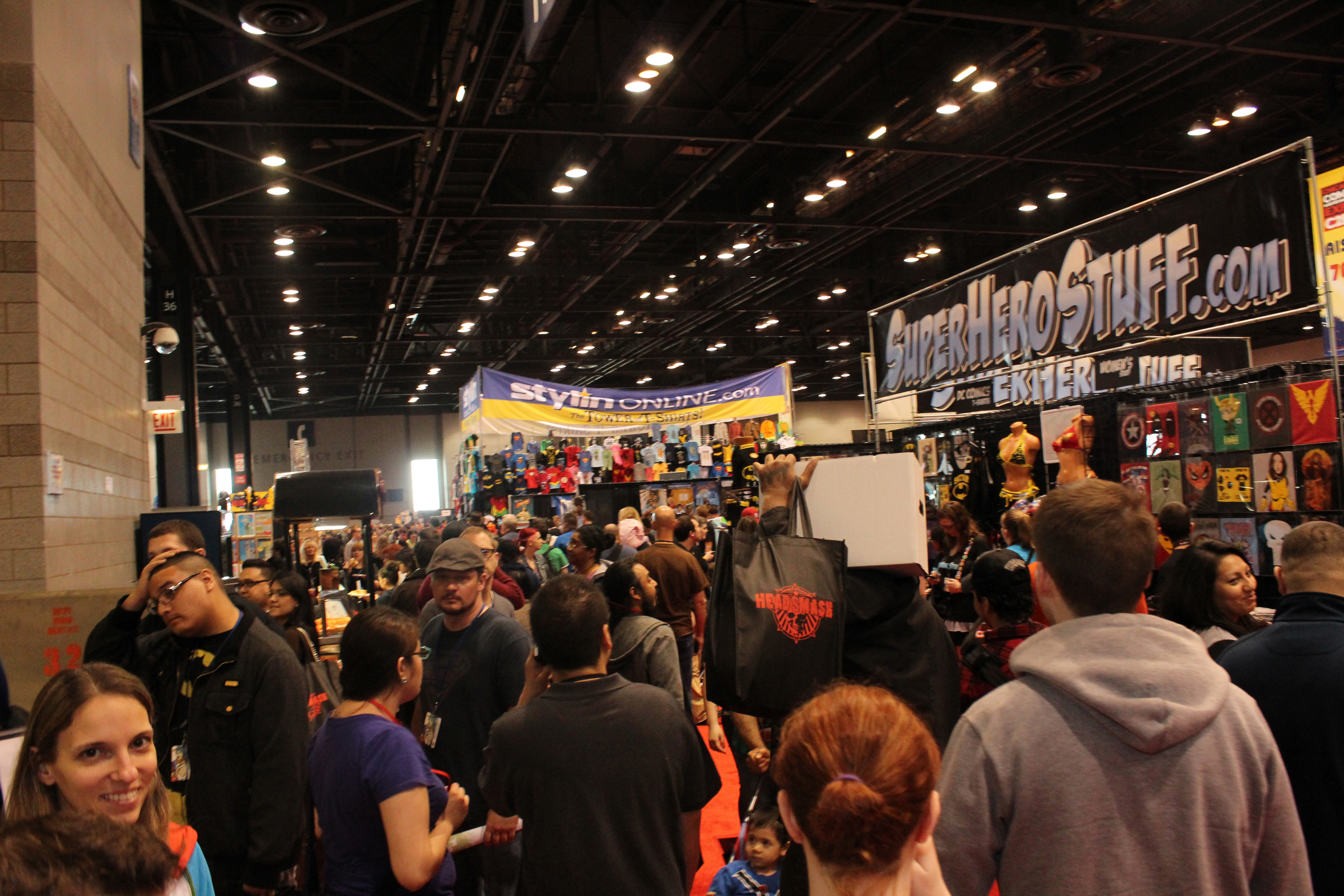
C2E2 2013 - crowd

The second C2E2 was held March 18–20, 2011, and included Thor actor Chris Hemsworth. Other guests included Buffy the Vampire Slayer and Dollhouse actress Eliza Dushku, The Walking Dead actors Laurie Holden and Jon Bernthal, and Supernatural actor Mark Sheppard.

The third C2E2 was held April 13–15, 2012, and 41,000 attendees were reported. It included Doctor Who and Torchwood actor John Barrowman, Lord of the Rings actor Sean Astin, and The Walking Dead actors Steven Yeun and Lauren Cohan.

The fourth C2E2 was held April 26–28, 2013, and 53,000 attendees were reported. Some of the spotlight guests included the 1960s Batman TV series actors Adam West, Burt Ward, and Julie Newmar, Game of Thrones actress Natalie Dormer, Hellboy actor Ron Perlman, The Walking Dead actors Laurie Holden and Chandler Riggs, Doctor Who actor Peter Davison, The Guild actress Felicia Day, and comedian Kevin Smith.

C2E2 2014 was held April 25–27, 2014. It included comic legend Stan Lee, Torchwood actress Eve Myles, Game of Thrones actors Alfie Allen, Natalia Tena, and Kristian Nairn, Teen Wolf actors Tyler Posey and Crystal Reed, and The Southern Vampire Mysteries series author Charlaine Harris.

C2E2 2015 was held April 24–26, 2015. Comic legend Stan Lee appeared once again this year. Other notable guests included Agent Carter actress Hayley Atwell, Agents of S.H.I.E.L.D. actress Ming-Na Wen, Doctor Who actor Sylvester McCoy, Game of Thrones actors Jason Momoa and Finn Jones, Firefly actress Jewel Staite, Mystery Science Theater 3000 creator Joel Hodgson, Lord of the Rings actor Sean Astin, and most of the cast of Orphan Black.

C2E2 2016 was held March 18–20, 2016. Some of the spotlight entertainment guests included Agents of S.H.I.E.L.D. actors Chloe Bennet and J. August Richards, Supergirl actresses Melissa Benoist and Chyler Leigh, and Sons of Anarchy actors Ryan Hurst and Tommy Flanagan.

The 2020 C2E2 was held February 28 to March 1, just before the COVID-19 pandemic. The 2021 edition was originally planned to be held March 26–28; however, it was postponed to December 10–12 due to the pandemic.

=== Dates ===
Dates	Attendance	Spotlight Comic Guests	Spotlight Entertainment Guests
April 16–18, 2010	27,500	Alex Ross, Mark Bagley, Jimmy Cheung, Amanda Conner, Peter David, Tony S. Daniel, Dan DiDio, Terry & Rachel Dodson, Colleen Doran, Garth Ennis, David Finch, Neil Gaiman, Ron Garney, Michael Golden, Jackson "Butch" Guice, Jonathan Hickman, Adam Hughes, Geoff Johns, Chip Kidd, Adam Kubert, Andy Kubert, Greg Land, Bob Layton, Jim Lee, Paul Levitz, Joseph Michael Linsner, Jeph Loeb, Doug Mahnke, Steve McNiven, Mike Mignola, Terry Moore, Greg Pak, Jimmy Palmiotti, Paul Pelletier, Joe Quesada, James Robinson, Ethan Van Sciver, Gail Simone, Dash Shaw, Jeff Smith, Ben Templesmith, Peter Tomasi, Jim Valentino, Chris Ware, Daniel Way, Bill Willingham	Amy Allen, Rich Appel, Lance Briggs, Miracole Burns, Emma Caulfield, Kevin Conroy, Carrie Fisher, Steve Gonsalves, Mike Henry, Aaron Johnson, Jerry Lawler, Daniel Logan, Peter Mayhew, Christopher Mintz-Plasse, Chloë Grace Moretz
March 18–20, 2011	34,000	Brian Michael Bendis, Paul Cornell, Tony Daniel, Garth Ennis, Matt Fraction, Adam Hughes, Jeph Loeb, Mary Pat Gleason, Doug Mahnke, Tony Moore, Joe Quesada, Ivan Reis, Gail Simone, Scott Snyder, Mark Waid, Bill Willingham	Chris Hemsworth, Eliza Dushku, Laurie Holden, Jon Bernthal, Sam Trammell, Kristin Bauer, Brit Morgan, Tahmoh Penikett, Mark Sheppard, Patton Oswalt, Chris Hardwick
April 13–15, 2012	41,000	Adam Hughes, Axel Alonso, Bill Willingham, Brian Azzarello, Dan Didio, Dan Slott, David Finch, Gail Simone, Geoff Johns, George Perez, J Michael Straczynski, Jason Aaron, Jeph Loeb, Jhonen Vasquez, Joe Kubert, Joe Quesada, Lee Bermejo, Len Wein, Marc Silvestri, Mark Waid, Neal Adams, Rick Remender, Scott Snyder, Tim Sale, Tony Daniel, Tony Moore	Anthony Daniels, Chad Michael Murray, Chris Hardwick, John Barrowman, John Cusack, Josh Gates, Lauren Cohan, Nicholas Brendon, Sean Astin, Shane West, Shia LaBeouf, Stephanie Izard, Stephen Rannazzisi, Steven Yeun, Tom Morello, Val Kilmer
April 26–28, 2013	53,000	Alex Ross, Brian Azzarello, Eric Powell, Ethan Van Sciver, J. Michael Straczynski, Kieron Gillen, Len Wein, Michael Golden, Olivier Coipel, Paul Cornell, Rick Remender, Tony S Daniel	Ashley Eckstein, Brian Posehn, Bruce Boxleitner, Burt Ward, Chad Coleman, Chandler Riggs, David Bailie, Felicia Day, James Cosmo, Janina Gavankar, Julie Newmar, Kevin Mcnally, Kevin Smith, Laurie Holden, Lee Arenberg, Mackenzie Crook, Martin Klebba, Mike Drucker, Myq Kaplan, Natalie Dormer, Patton Oswalt, Peter Davison, Ron Perlman, Ryan Buell, Sam Huntington
April 25–27, 2014	68,900	Adam Hughes, Adi Granov, Brian Azzarello, Dan Jurgens, Eric Powell, Gail Simone, Jimmy Palmiotti, Lee Bermejo, Mark Bagley, Neal Adams, Olivier Coipel, Scott Snyder, Stan Lee, Tony Daniel, Tony Moore	Alfie Allen, Allison Scagliotti, Brian Posehn, Carlos Bernard, Chandler Riggs, Crystal Reed, Eddie Mcclintock, Eve Myles, Grant Bowler, Hulk Hogan, Jaime Murray, James Morrison, Janet Varney, Jesse Rath, KC Collins, Kris Holden-Ried, Kristian Nairn, Kyle Kinane, Louis Lombardi, Molly Quinn, Natalia Tena, Nicholas Brendon, Peter Sagal, Rick Howland, Rider Strong, Rj Mitte, Saul Rubinek, Tony Curran, Tyler Posey, Veronica Taylor
April 24–26, 2015	71,000	Amanda Conner, Bill Willingham, Dan Slott, David Finch, Eric Powell, Gail Simone, Greg Tocchini, Humberto Ramos, James Robinson, Jerome Opeña, Jimmy Palmiotti, Jonathan Hickman, Max Brooks, Nick Dragotta, Rick Remender, Ryan Stegman, Scott Snyder, Stan Lee, Tim Seeley	Ari Millen, Brad Neely, Casper Kelly, Chad L. Coleman, Chris Sabat, Clare Kramer, CM Punk, Craig Rowin, Daniel Weidenfeld, Dave Newberg, Dave Willis, David Ramsey, Dylan Bruce, Emmanuelle Vaugier, Eoin Macken, Finn Jones, Hayley Atwell, Henry Zebrowski, Jason Mewes, Jason Momoa, Jewel Staite, Joel Hodgson, John Fawcett, Jordan Gavaris, Karan Soni, Kevin Smith, Leah Pipes, Maria Doyle Kennedy, Matt Dillon, Milana Vayntrub, Ming-Na Wen, M. Night Shyamalan, Neve Mcintosh, Neville Page, Paul Amos, Paul Feig, Raphael Sbarge, Scott Adsit, Sean Astin, Sean Schemmel, Sebastian Roche, Sylvester Mccoy, Trace Beaulieu
March 18–20, 2016	72,000	Gail Simone, Mike Mignola, Jim Zub, Joyce Chin, Jill Thompson, Fabian Nicleza, Phil Noto, Robbie Thompson, Scott Snyder, Greg Capullo, Tim Seeley, Vince Locke, Frank Cho, Edwin Huang, Amy Chu, Annie Wu, Gene Ha, Joyce Chin, Ming Doyle, Stacey Lee	Chloe Bennet, J. August Richards, Melissa Benoist, Chyler Leigh, Ryan Hurst, Tommy Flanagan, CM Punk, Austin St. John, Rose McGowan, Edwards James Olmos, Mary McDonnell, John Cusack, John Ratzenberger, D.B. Sweeney, Hynden Walch, Jeremy Shada, Kelynan Lonsdale, Ksenia Solo, Karan Ashley, Sasha Rolz, Rachel Skarsten, Ask Me Another
April 21–23, 2017	80,000	Stan Lee, Frank Miller, Kieron Gillen, Jen Bartel	Mike Coulter, Evanna Lynch, Millie Bobby Brown, Jason David Frank, Vincent D'Onofrio, Finn Wolfhard, Walter Jones, David Yost, Steve Blum, Jennifer Hale, Veronica Taylor
April 6–8, 2018	82,500	Neal Adams, Brian Michael Bendis, Josh Blaylock, Mark Brooks, Frank Cho, Chris Claremont, Katie Cook, Phil Foglio, Gene Ha, Greg Horn, Ken Lashley, Jae Lee, Jim Lee, Comfort Love, Jim Mahfood, Mark Millar, Sean Gordon Murphy, Ada Palmer, Richard Pini, Wendy Pini, Whilce Portacio, Andy Price, Humberto Ramos, Sara Richard, Tim Sale, Tim Seeley, R. L. Stine, Philip Tan, Raina Telgemeier, Ben Templesmith, Mark Waid, Adam Withers, Skottie Young	Laura Bailey, Dave Bautista, Charlet Chung, Aaron Douglas, Richard Epcar, Sean Gunn, Mitsuhisa Ishikawa, Taliesin Jaffe, Lloyd Kaufman, Phil LaMarr, Caity Lotz, Vanessa Marshall, Matthew Mercer, Breckin Meyer, Liam O'Brien, Khary Payton, Marisha Ray, Sam Riegel, Brandon Routh, Mark Sheppard, Fred Tatasciore, Alan Tudyk, Kari Wahlgren, Travis Willingham, David Yost
March 22–24, 2019	90,000	Brandon Santiago	Clark Gregg
February 28–March 1, 2020	95,000		
December 10–12, 2021			
August 5–7, 2022	65,000		
March 31–April 2, 2023	75,000		
April 26-28, 2024	85,000		
April 11–13, 2025	100,000		
March 27-29, 2026

== Events ==
C2E2 has panels by the comics and anime industry, entertainment guests, and attendees, along with special screenings of shows and live recordings of podcasts. Since 2013, C2E2 and We Are Cosplay organize a march in the Chicago St. Patrick's Day Parade with cosplayers.

=== Crown Championships of Cosplay ===
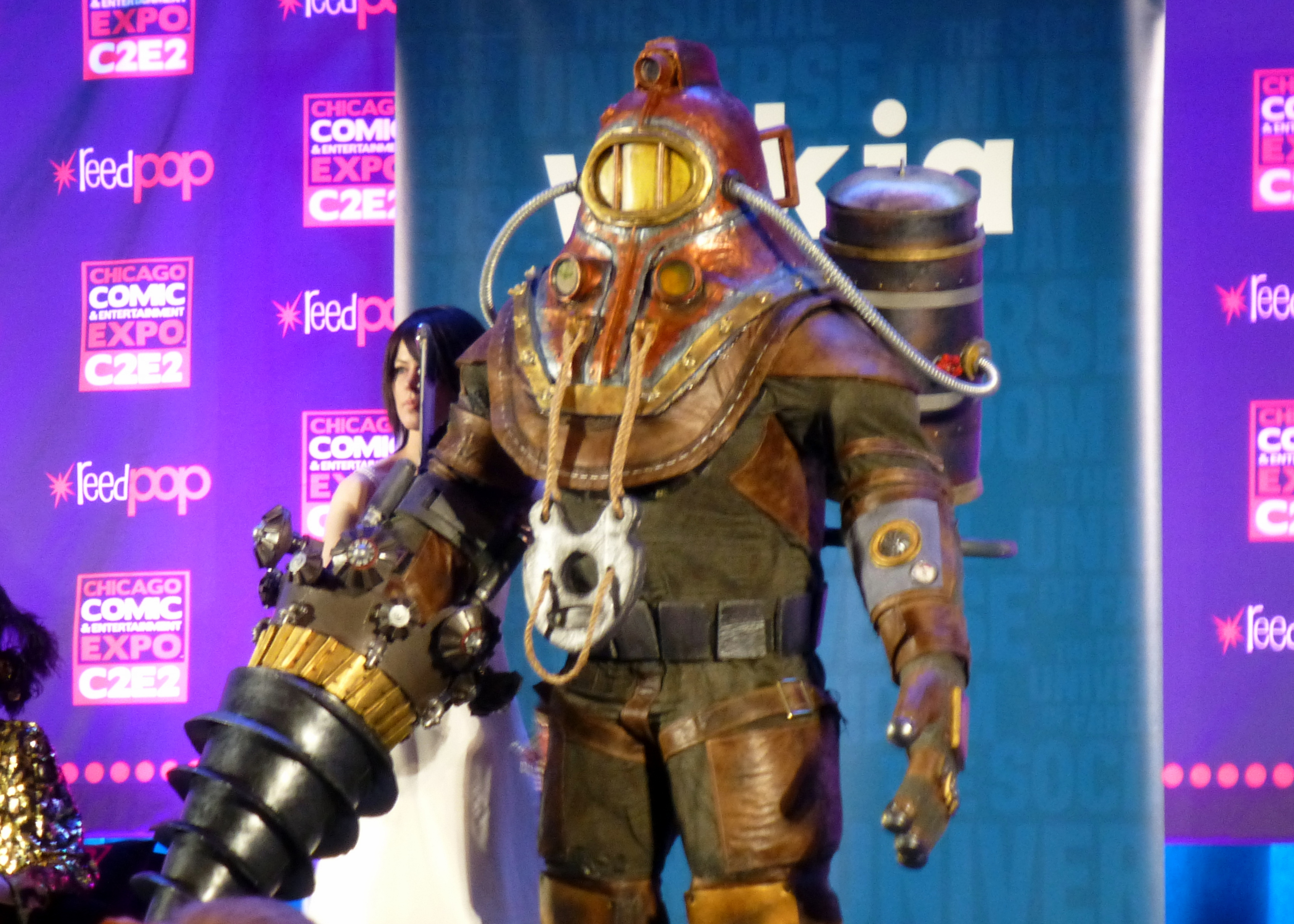
C2E2 2014 Winner - Big Daddy

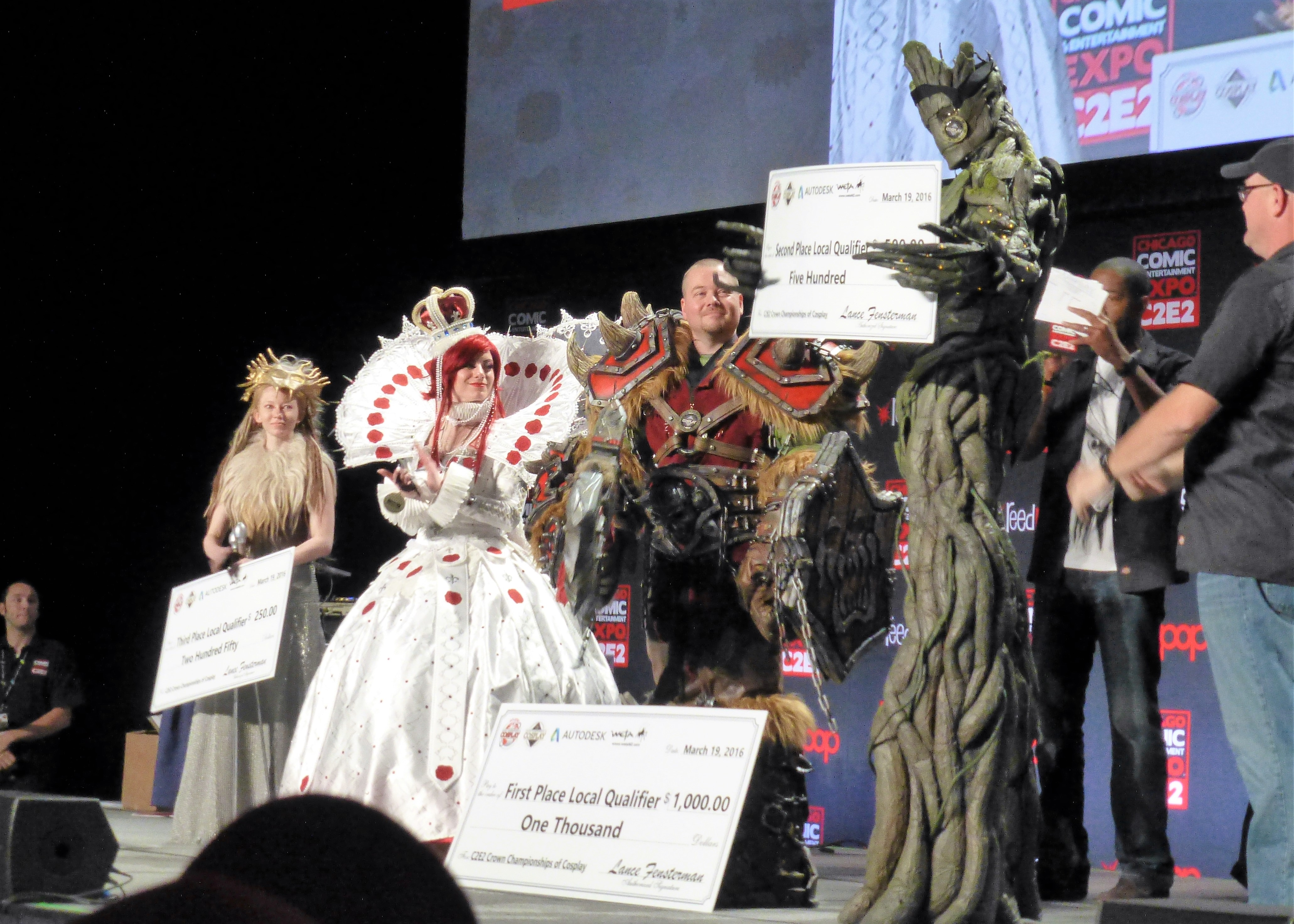
Local qualifier finalists in 2016

C2E2 Crown Championships of Cosplay, claimed to be "the largest and most prestigious cosplay competition in the world," began in 2014. It is a craftsmanship award show with a pre-judging session and a stage display, which is live-streamed over the internet. In 2016 the contest was opened into as an international contest for participating countries.

The contestants are chosen from select countries worldwide. In the United states there are 4 state regional qualifiers with the global finalist chosen at C2E2. The top three winners from the united states receive cash prizes of $1,000, $500 and $250 and The global champions win cash prizes of $5,000, $2,000 and $1,000. The global champion is usually further presented with a crown trophy as well.

In 2021 EuroCosplay Contest merged with the Crown Championship and held the first contest after covid in 2022 at London to commemorate this. The previous format of hosting the Chicago regional qualifier at C2E2, United States selections, and then global finals in the same night continued in 2023 thereafter.

Judging

The judging criteria is currently 30% awarded on accuracy or design & ambition and a further 70% awarded on construction. In qualifying countries and in previous finals a performance aspect has been included.

==== Winners ====
Chicago Champion
Year	1st	2nd	3rd
2014	Kyle Mathis (Subject Delta)	Trent Thornton (Ming the Merciless)	Lisa Hale (Queen Amidala)
2015	Jim Schmid (Groot)	Erin Hannah (Khorne Marauder)	Jennifer Bowden (Silurian Warrior)
2016	Steven K Smith Props (Warcraft Orc)	Calen "Propcustomz" Hoffman (Groot)	Vera Campbell (Jadis, the White Witch)
2017	Brittani Ginoza (Blood Elf Priest)	Lunar Rose (Lucille Sharpe)	Mariah Pattie (Batgirl)

Global Champion
Year	1st	2nd	3rd
2016	Sam "Major Sam" Mansfield (Julietta Necromancer), Australia	Andres Bauer (Wheeljack), Austria	Steven K Smith Props (Orc), United States
2017	Ildikó Melinda "Okkido Cosplay" Jobbágy (Ordo Hereticus Inquisitor), Austria	Erika Jean "Ae Ri Cosplay" Garbin (Astalos Female Gunner), Singapore	Brittani Ginoza (Blood Elf Priest), United States
2018	Alchemical Cosplay (Astrologian), United States	AmenoKitarou (Bahamut), Australia	Arlequin Workshop (Gunslinger Spawn) France
2019	Cowbutt Crunchies (Demon Lord Heldasercle), United States	Kinpatsu Cosplay (Sister of Battle), South Africa	The Dingo Ate my Cosplay (Eriodna) Australia
2020	JinxieCosplay (Blood Priestess Bathory) South Africa	Xephyr Studios (Moria), United States	LeelooKris Cosplay (Lagertha), France
2022	Amazonian Cosplay (Sansa Stark), United Kingdom	Vega.art.cosplay (Human Ranger), Estonia	Opiekun (Geralt of Rivia), Poland
2023	NerdsGoneMildCosplay (Aloy) United States	Ludus.Cosplay (Aratak), South Africa	Alisyuon (Sakizo Illustration), Spain
2024	Matthew__Barry (Leather Armor Hunter), United Kingdom	Hermione_Cosplay (Snow White), Spain	JinxieCosplay (Seraphim), South Africa
2025	Henchwench (Halsin), Australia	patternermage (Firesong), United States	anaelic_ (Navia), United Kingdom

==== Judges ====
Past judges include Yaya Han (Cosplayer), Ivy DoomKitty (Cosplayer), Ann Foley (Costume designer for Agents of S.H.I.E.L.D.), Leri Greer (Senior concept designer for Weta Workshop, worked on Mad Max: Fury Road), Stephanie Maslansky (Costume designer for Daredevil and Jessica Jones), Ashley Eckstein (Her Universe), Austin Scarlett (Fashion designer from Project Runway), Neville Page (film and television creature and concept designer), and Nan Cibula-Jenkins (Head of costume design at The Theatre School at DePaul University).
